= Şinasi =

Şinasi is the Turkish spelling of the Persian name (شناسی), also transliterated as Shinasi. Today, it is commonly used as a male given name.

== Given name ==
- İbrahim Şinasi (1826–1871), Ottoman author, playwright, and journalist
- Şinasi Bozatlı (born 1962), Turkish painter and sculptor
- Şinasi Gündüz (born 1960), Turkish historian of religion

== Surname ==
- Morris Schinasi (1855–1928), American tobacco industrialist of Ottoman origin
- Altina Schinasi (1907–1999), American artist, entrepreneur, and inventor, daughter of Morris

== Places ==
- Şinasi Sahnesi, theatre in Ankara, Turkey, named after İbrahim Şinasi
