= Madrona =

Madrona may refer to:

== Places ==
=== Canada ===
- Madrona Island, an island in the Johnstone Strait region of the Central Coast of British Columbia
- Madrona Point, on the east coast of Vancouver Island, British Columbia between the communities of Parksville and Nanoose Bay
- Madrona Bay, part of Ganges Harbour on Saltspring Island, British Columbia
- Madrona School, a not-for-profit independent school in Vancouver, British Columbia

=== Spain ===
- Madrona, a village in the municipality of Pinell de Solsonès in Catalonia
- Madrona (Segovia), a village in the municipality of Segovia in Castile and León

=== United States ===
- Madrona, Seattle, a neighborhood in Seattle, Washington

== Saints ==
- Saint Madrona, or Madron (saint), a patron of the church at Madron, Cornwall, United Kingdom
- Madrona of Barcelona, a saint of the Roman Catholic Church, born in Thessaloniki and venerated in Barcelona

== Other uses ==
- Arbutus, a genus of flowering tree whose North American members are called "madrones" or "madronas"
- USCGC Madrona (WLB-302), a U. S. Coast Guard seagoing buoy tender

== See also ==
- Madrone (disambiguation)
- Madroño (disambiguation)
