= Charles Carey =

Charles Carey may refer to:

- Charles F. Carey Jr. (1915–1945), United States Army soldier and Medal of Honor recipient
- Charles James Carey (1838–1891), Royal Navy officer
- Charles Carey (producer), Oscar-nominated producer of the 1960 documentary George Grosz' Interregnum

== See also ==
- Henry Charles Carey (1793–1879), economist
