= Madrone (disambiguation) =

Madrone is a vernacular name for plants of the genus Arbutus.

Madrone may also refer to:

- Madrone, California, a neighborhood in Silicon Valley
- Madrone, New Mexico, a census-designated place
- Madrone butterfly
- Madrone shield bearer, a moth
- Madrone (band), an American alternative rock band

== See also ==
- Madrona (disambiguation)
