= Carey Group =

Island group in British Columbia, Canada

Coordinates: 50°36′06″N 126°36′51″W

The Carey Group is a group of small islands in the Queen Charlotte Strait-Johnstone Strait region of the Central Coast of British Columbia, between Crease Island to the north-northwest and Harbledown Island to the south-southeast. It includes Ralph, Alder and Larsen Islands, and three small islands to the north of Larsen Island, including Madrona Island.

== Name origin ==
The Carey Group was named for Charles James Carey, RN, first lieutenant aboard HMS Clio under Captain Turnour, for whom Turnour Island is named. Carey, who served with the Royal Navy's Pacific Station based at Esquimalt, was born in 1838 and entered the navy in 1850. He attained the rank of lieutenant in 1858, then raised to commander in 1868, retiring with the rank of captain in 1883; He died in 1891.
