= Fairview, Vancouver =

Neighborhood of Vancouver, British Columbia, Canada

Fairview
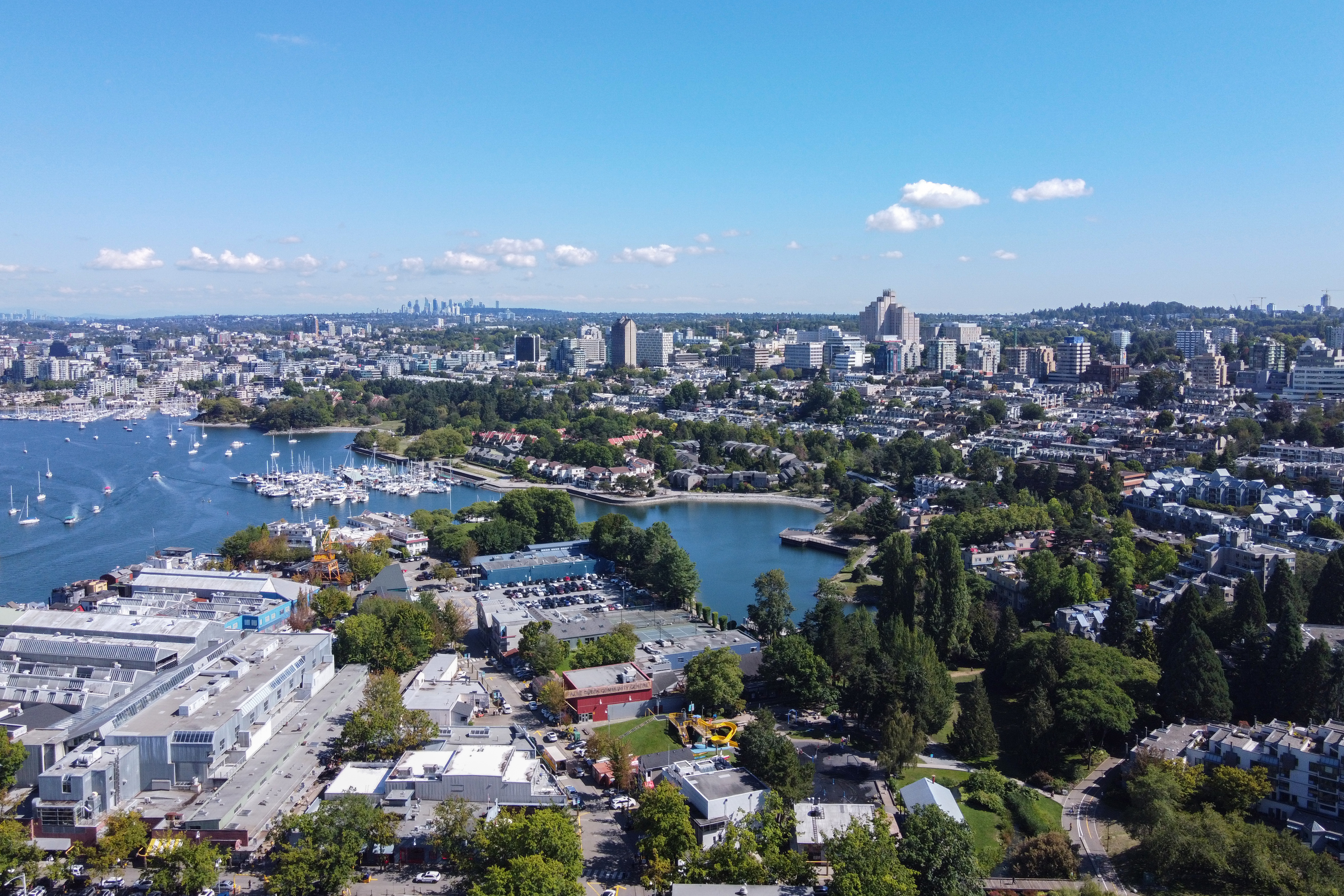
- Fairview, Vancouver view from Granville Island in 2025

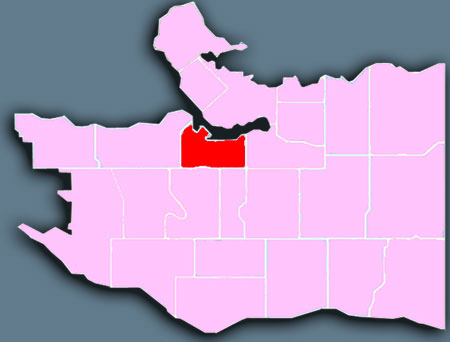
- Location of Fairview in Vancouver
- Coordinates: 49.264°N 123.130°W
- Country: Canada
- Province: British Columbia
- Region: Lower Mainland
- Regional district: Metro Vancouver
- City: Vancouver

Area
  - Total: 3.27 km^{2} (1.26 sq mi)

Population
  - Total: 33,620
  - Density: 10,281.3/km^{2} (26,628/sq mi)

Fairview is a neighbourhood on the west side of the city of Vancouver, British Columbia, Canada. It runs from False Creek in the north to 16th Avenue in the south, and from Burrard Street in the west to Cambie Street in the east.

Central Broadway is an important commercial and employment centre focused around Vancouver General Hospital and other health-related institutions, including the BC Cancer Agency, BC Cancer Research Centre, BC Healthy Living Alliance, and the BC Centre for Disease Control. Other shopping areas in the neighbourhood are South Granville Rise, City Square Shopping Centre, and Granville Island.

Some city offices are located on the eastern fringe of Fairview, across Cambie Street from Vancouver City Hall.

== Education ==
Fairview is served by two high schools: Kitsilano Secondary School and Eric Hamber Secondary School. The area has many elementary schools including: L'École Bilingue, Emily Carr Elementary School, Edith Cavell Elementary School, False Creek Elementary School, Henry Hudson Elementary School, Shaughnessy Elementary School, and Trafalgar Elementary School, although only False Creek and L'École Bilingue are physically located in the neighbourhood. The private schools Madrona School and Blessed Sacrament School also find their home in the neighbourhood.

== History ==
Before being industrialized, Fairview was a primeval rain forest rich with wildlife and gigantic timber. In 1887, the Canadian Pacific Railway built the trail yards on the north side of False Creek. The forests got cleared for sawmills, shipyards and factories.

The area was one of the CPR land grants within the city but remained largely undeveloped until the city's expansion outside the Burrard Peninsula with the construction of the city's new electric railway system in the 1890s. Among the city's lines, which included the Cambie and Granville streetcars and the crosstown route along Broadway, a line known as the Fairview Loop ran in both directions from downtown up Main to Broadway to Granville and back into downtown.

With that area's ease of access to the city core, commercial and residential development quickly filled out the neighbourhood, which north of Broadway enjoys a fine view of the city core and the North Shore Mountains, hence the name.

== Demographics ==
As of 2016, Fairview has 33,620 people. 9.6% of the population is under the age of 20; 40.0% is between 20 and 39; 32.8% is between 40 and 64; and 17.5% is 65 or older. 70.9% of Fairview residents speak English as a first language, and 7.7% speak a Chinese language. The median household income is $69,337 and 14.7% of its population lives in low-income households. The unemployment rate is 4.6%.

Panethnic groups in the Fairview neighbourhood (2001−2016)
Panethnic group	2016		2006		2001	
Panethnic group	Pop.	%	Pop.	%	Pop.	%
European (Note: Statistic includes all persons that did not make up part of a visible minority or an indigenous identity.)	23,645	72.25%	21,375	75.03%	21,460	77.89%
East Asian (Note: Statistic includes total responses of "Chinese", "Korean", and "Japanese" under visible minority section on census.)	4,870	14.88%	4,210	14.78%	3,795	13.77%
South Asian	885	2.7%	580	2.04%	415	1.51%
Southeast Asian (Note: Statistic includes total responses of "Filipino" and "Southeast Asian" under visible minority section on census.)	865	2.64%	620	2.18%	610	2.21%
Indigenous	590	1.8%	360	1.26%	285	1.03%
Middle Eastern (Note: Statistic includes total responses of "West Asian" and "Arab" under visible minority section on census.)	565	1.73%	325	1.14%	315	1.14%
Latin American	485	1.48%	470	1.65%	290	1.05%
African	380	1.16%	310	1.09%	235	0.85%
Other/Multiracial (Note: Statistic includes total responses of "Visible minority, n.i.e." and "Multiple visible minorities" under visible minority section on census.)	435	1.33%	235	0.82%	140	0.51%
Total responses	32,725	100%	28,490	97.25%	27,550	96.99%
Total population	33,620	100%	29,295	100%	28,405	100%
Note: Totals greater than 100% due to multiple origin responses
