= Healthy Living =

Healthy Living may refer to:

- A lifestyle characterized by good health
- Minister responsible for Healthy Living, a ministerial position in the government of Manitoba, Canada
- BC Healthy Living Alliance, a coalition of health professionals in British Columbia, Canada
- Healthy Living, a publishing imprint of The Farm (Tennessee)

== See also ==
- Healthy diet
