= Burnet Tuthill =

American musicologist and conductor

- Born: Burnet Corwin Tuthill; November 16, 1888; New York City, U.S.
- Died: January 18, 1982 (aged 93); Knoxville, Tennessee, U.S.
- Parent: William Tuthill (father)

Academic background
- Education: Columbia University (BA); College of Music of Cincinnati (MA)

Burnet Corwin Tuthill (November 16, 1888 – January 18, 1982) was an American conductor, composer and musicologist. He co-founded the National Association of Schools of Music and served as its secretary from 1924 to 1959. He also organized and became the first conductor of the Memphis Symphony Orchestra.

== Biography ==
Tuthill was born in New York City on November 16, 1888, the son of Carnegie Hall architect William Tuthill. He received his B.A. from Columbia University in 1909. He played clarinet in the Columbia University Orchestra and later became its conductor.

After Columbia, Tuthill began a career in business. From 1922 to 1930, he was business manager of the Cincinnati Conservatory of Music. He studied at the College of Music of Cincinnati between 1930 and 1935, earning a master's degree in 1935. He did not begin to compose until 1927, when he was 39 years of age.

Tuthill became music director of Southwestern at Memphis (now Rhodes College) after receiving his degree. He later became music director of the Memphis College of Music, which later merged with Rhodes, and founded the Memphis Symphony Orchestra, serving as conductor from 1938 to 1946. Among his students in the Memphis College of Music was the composer Moondog.

Tuthill founded the Society for the Publication of American Music (SPAM) in 1919 and the National Association of Schools of Music (NASM) in 1924, serving as its secretary from 1924 to 1959.

Tuthill died in Knoxville, Tennessee, on January 18, 1982.
