= Peter Sanders (filmmaker) =

American filmmaker and former actor

- Born: Hollywood, California
- Citizenship: American
- Education: University of Vermont (BA) New York University (Masters)
- Occupations: Filmmaker, actor

Peter Sanders is an American filmmaker and former actor. Sanders has directed and produced several films and short works.

== Early life and education ==
Sanders was born in Hollywood, California, and grew up in Buenos Aires, Argentina, and Denton, Texas. His father, Denis Sanders, was a two-time Academy Award-winning director known for Elvis: That’s the Way It Is (1970) and Czechoslovakia (1968). His mother, Malena Kuss, Ph.D., is a musicologist and Professor Emeritus at the University of North Texas. His great-grandfather, Morris Schinasi, was an Ottoman-born American businessman.

He graduated from Northfield-Mt. Hermon Preparatory School in 1988 and completed a bachelor of arts in history from the University of Vermont in 1992. Sanders pursued acting at the Stella Adler Conservatory in New York City from 1994 to 1995 before completing a master’s in broadcast journalism at New York University in 2006.

== Career ==
Sanders began his career in acting, performing in theater productions, including Requiem for a Life at Lincoln Center and Private Wars at the Stella Adler Theatre. He also appeared in a Mercedes-Benz commercial during the 1996 Super Bowl and Academy Awards.

Transitioning to filmmaking, Sanders directed and produced several documentaries, including:

- On the Shoulders of Giants: The History of NYU Langone Orthopedics (2024): This documentary chronicles the history of NYU Langone Orthopedics and was a finalist at the Tribeca X Film Festival.
- Altina (2014): A portrait of artist Altina Schinasi, Sanders’ paternal grandmother, which received the David A. Stein Award for Best Director and Best Film at the Toronto Jewish Film Festival.
- The Disappeared (2008): A documentary about Argentina’s Dirty War, which won a prize for best documentary at the Documentary and Fiction Festival of Hollywood.

== Personal life ==
Sanders is married to Daisy Hill Sanders, and they have two children. As of 2014, the family lives in Cold Spring, New York.

== Awards and recognition ==
- David A. Stein Award (2014) – Best Director and Best Film (Altina)
