= Charles Berwick Curtis =

Charles Berwick Curtis (18 March 1795 – 26 October 1876) was a manufacturer of gunpowder who was also deputy chairman of a life insurance company.

== Early life and family ==
Curtis was born on 18 March 1795 at Edmonton, Middlesex, the son of Sir William Curtis, 1st Baronet and Anne Constable. He married Henrietta Pearson on 30 November 1822.

Curtis had several children. His son, Spencer Henry Curtis (1833–1913), was a successful merchant associated with companies that traded with the West Indies.

Latterly, Curtis was resident at 105 Eaton Square, London.

== Career ==
Curtis was a manufacturer of gunpowder who traded as Curtis's and Harvey. The firm started at Hounslow in 1820 with backing from Sir William Curtis.

In 1841, Curtis obtained a patent, Particulars of a Method or Methods, by Self-acting Apparatus to be used on Railways, for obviating collisions between successive trains, etc which was published by Stewart & Murray of London in that year.

He was also deputy chairman of the United Kingdom Life Assurance Company.

He was a member of the Institution of Civil Engineers.

== Death ==
Curtis died 26 October 1876.
