= Hans Smit (professor) =

Dutch professor

- Born: August 13, 1927; Amsterdam, the Netherlands
- Died: January 7, 2012 (aged 84)

Academic background
- Education: University of Amsterdam (LLB, JD); Columbia University (MA, LLB)

Academic work
- Discipline: International law
- Institutions: Columbia University
- Influenced: Ruth Bader Ginsburg

Hans Smit (August 13, 1927 – January 7, 2012) was the Stanley H. Fuld Professor Emeritus of Law at Columbia Law School.

== Biography ==
Smit was born in Amsterdam and earned his LL.B. in 1946 and his J.D. in 1949 from the University of Amsterdam. He worked in private practice in The Hague before moving to New York City on a Fulbright scholarship, where he earned a master's degree at Columbia in 1953 and graduated first in his class with an LL.B. from Columbia Law School in 1958.

Smit worked for Sullivan & Cromwell for two years before joining the Columbia Law School faculty in 1960 as director of the Project on International Procedure. His students included future Supreme Court justice Ruth Bader Ginsburg, who served as a research associate and associate director of the program. He was credited for helping to revise section 1782 of Title 28 of the United States Code.

Smit also founded the Columbia-Leiden-Amsterdam Summer Program, which gave law students the opportunity to travel to the Netherlands for one month of intensive training in American law. He was an expert on European and international law and co-edited The Law of the European Economic Community with Peter E. Herzog. In 1978, Smit was appointed to the Stanley H. Fuld Chair at Columbia Law School.

He was elected a corresponding member of the Royal Netherlands Academy of Arts and Sciences in 1983. In 1987, he was made a Knight of the Order of the Netherlands Lion by Queen Beatrix.

== Personal life ==
Smit was the longtime owner of the Schinasi House, the only freestanding single-family mansion in Manhattan; he bought the mansion in 1979 and owned it for three decades. He died on January 7, 2012, at the age of 84.

Smit was a water polo player who played for New York Athletic Club.
