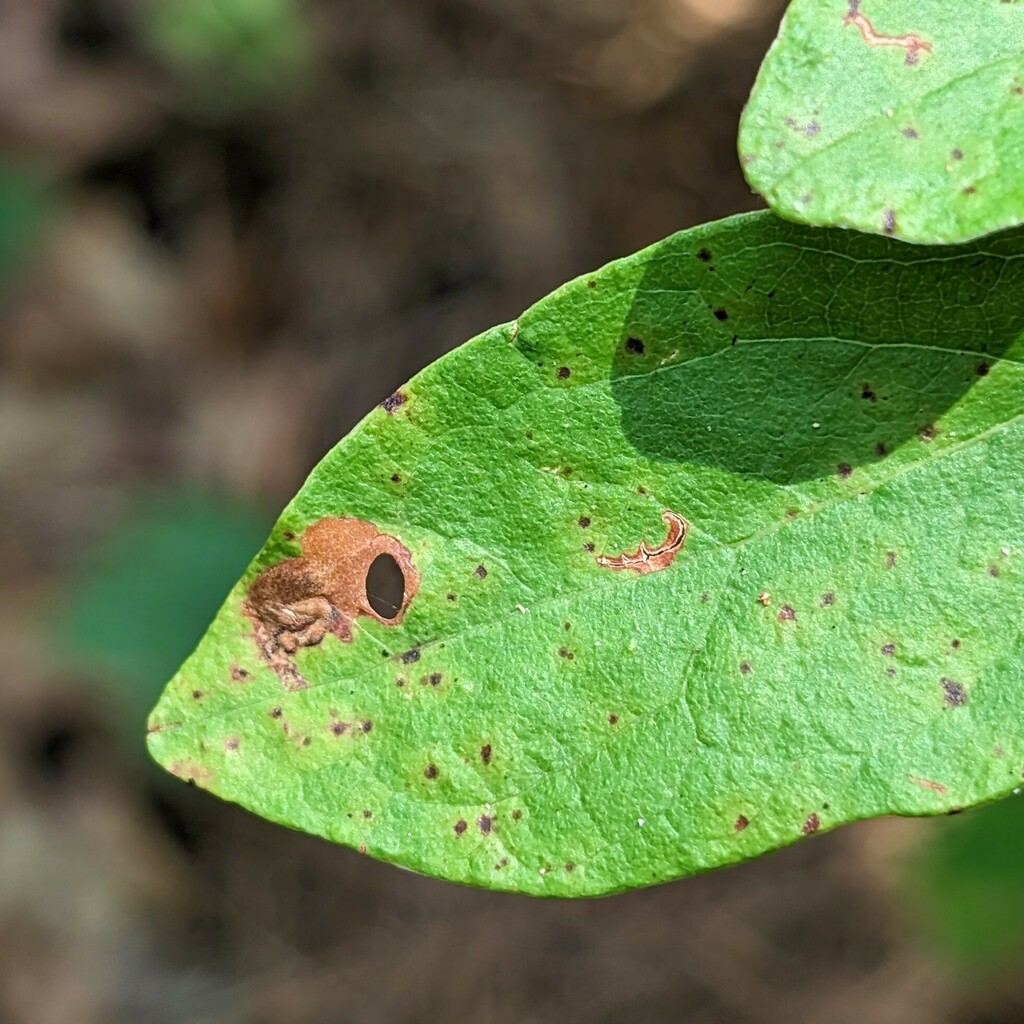

Scientific classification
- Kingdom: Animalia
- Phylum: Arthropoda
- Clade: Pancrustacea
- Class: Insecta
- Order: Lepidoptera
- Family: Heliozelidae
- Genus: Coptodisca
- Species: C. magnella

Binomial name
- Coptodisca magnella Braun, 1916

= Coptodisca magnella =

Species of moth

Coptodisca magnella is a moth of the family Heliozelidae. It was described by Annette Frances Braun in 1916. It is found in North America, including Kentucky, Mississippi and Ohio.

The basal half of the forewings is pale silvery gray, while the apical half is golden yellow. The hindwings are gray.

The larvae feed on Gaylussacia species. They mine the leaves of their host plant.
