= Coptodisca kalmiella =

Scientific classification
- Domain: Eukaryota
- Kingdom: Animalia
- Phylum: Arthropoda
- Class: Insecta
- Order: Lepidoptera
- Family: Heliozelidae
- Genus: Coptodisca
- Species: C. kalmiella

Binomial name
- Coptodisca kalmiella Dietz, 1921

Species of moth

Coptodisca kalmiella is a moth of the family Heliozelidae. It was described by Dietz in 1921. It is found in North America, including New Jersey.

The forewings are golden-brown from the base to about the middle of the wing, passing gradually into golden yellow.

The larvae feed on Kalmia angustifolia. They mine the leaves of their host plant. The mines are irregular and blotch-like, extending from the midrib almost and sometimes entirely to the edge of the leaf. The number of mines in a single leaf varies from one to about twelve. Full-grown larvae cut an oval case from a part of the mine which is free from frass. The case containing the larva either drops to the ground or the larva crawls to the tip of a leaf pulling the case after it, and finally drops to the ground after hanging a short time suspended by a thread. Pupation takes place within the case.
