= Coptodisca quercicolella =

Scientific classification
- Domain: Eukaryota
- Kingdom: Animalia
- Phylum: Arthropoda
- Class: Insecta
- Order: Lepidoptera
- Family: Heliozelidae
- Genus: Coptodisca
- Species: C. quercicolella

Binomial name
- Coptodisca quercicolella Braun, 1927

Species of moth

Coptodisca quercicolella is a moth of the family Heliozelidae. It was described by Annette Frances Braun in 1927. It is found in North America including California and Colorado.

The larvae feed on Quercus gambelii. They mine the leaves of their host plant.
