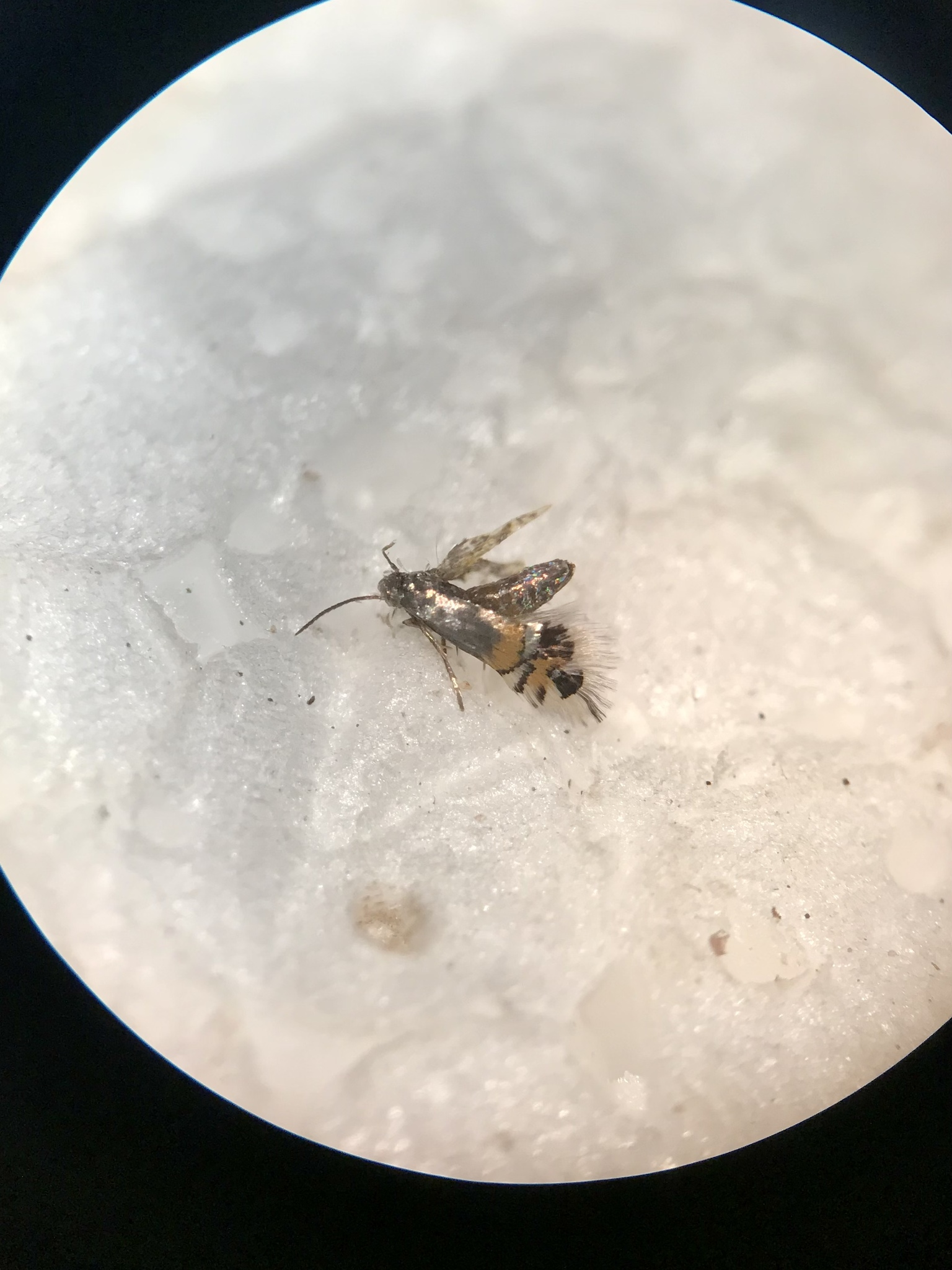

Scientific classification
- Kingdom: Animalia
- Phylum: Arthropoda
- Clade: Pancrustacea
- Class: Insecta
- Order: Lepidoptera
- Family: Heliozelidae
- Genus: Coptodisca
- Species: C. negligens

Binomial name
- Coptodisca negligens Braun, 1920

= Coptodisca negligens =

Species of moth

Coptodisca negligens is a species of moth in the family Heliozelidae. It was first described in 1920 by Annette Frances Braun. It is found in North America, including Ohio.

The wingspan is 4-4-5 mm. The basal half of the forewings is pale leaden metallic, while the apical half is bright orange yellow. The hindwings are gray. There is one generation per year with adults on wing from late June to mid-July.

The larvae feed on Vaccinium macrocarpon. They mine the leaves of their host plant. Larvae can be found from mid-April and early July.
