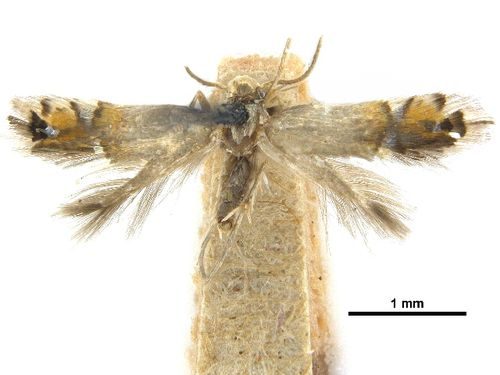

Scientific classification
- Kingdom: Animalia
- Phylum: Arthropoda
- Clade: Pancrustacea
- Class: Insecta
- Order: Lepidoptera
- Family: Heliozelidae
- Genus: Coptodisca
- Species: C. saliciella

Binomial name
- Coptodisca saliciella (Clements, 1861)

Synonyms
- Aspidisca saliciella Clemens, 1861

= Coptodisca saliciella =

Species of moth

Coptodisca saliciella is a moth of the family Heliozelidae. It was described by Clements in 1861. It is found in North America, including California and Ohio.

The larvae feed on Salix species, including Salix lasiolepis. They mine the leaves of their host plant.
