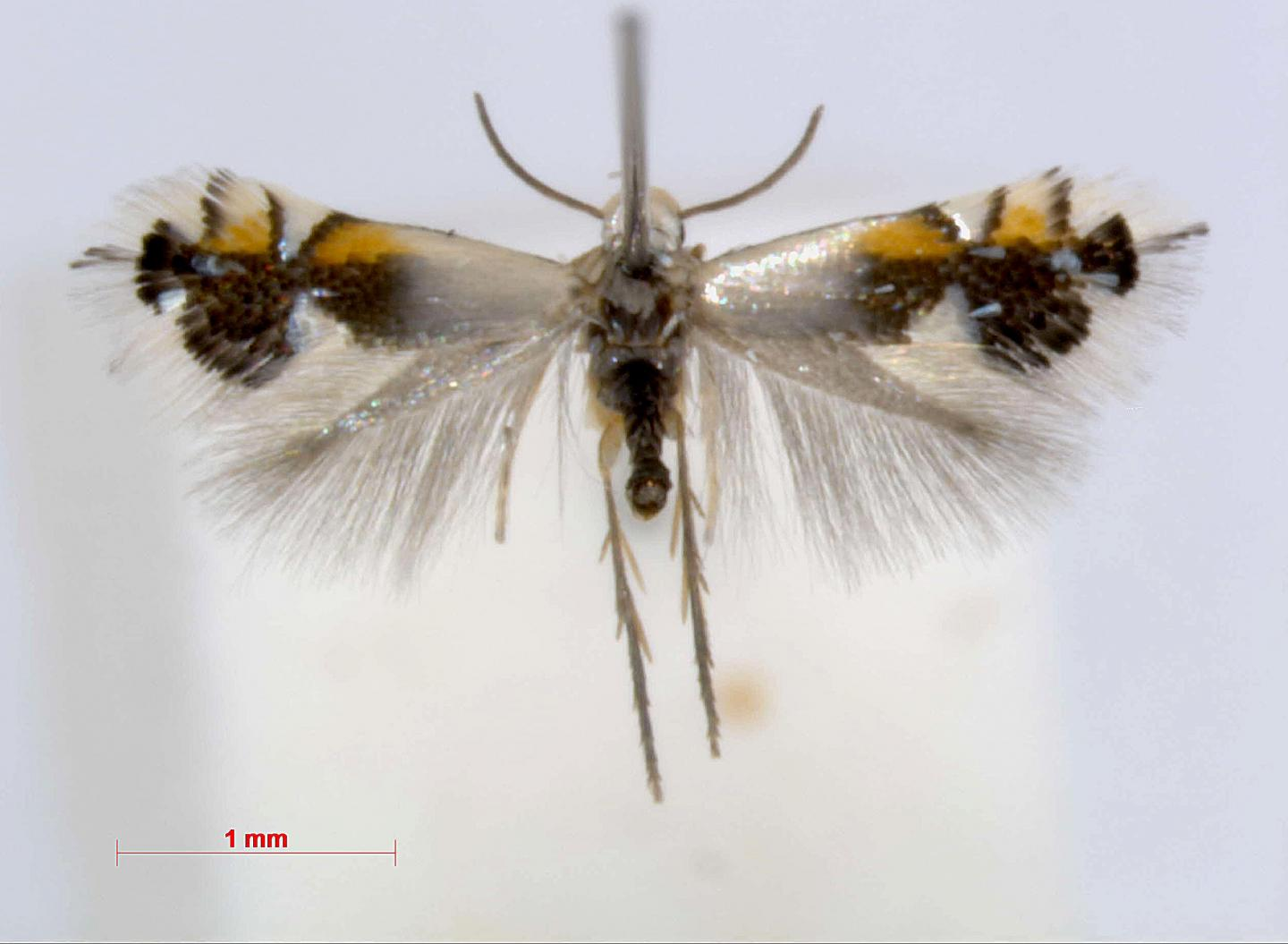

Scientific classification
- Kingdom: Animalia
- Phylum: Arthropoda
- Clade: Pancrustacea
- Class: Insecta
- Order: Lepidoptera
- Family: Heliozelidae
- Genus: Coptodisca
- Species: C. lucifluella

Binomial name
- Coptodisca lucifluella (Clemens, 1860)

Synonyms
- Aspidisca lucifluella Clemens, 1860

= Coptodisca lucifluella =

Species of moth

Coptodisca lucifluella is a moth of the family Heliozelidae. It was described by James Brackenridge Clemens in 1860. It is found in North America, including Kentucky and Ohio.

The larvae feed on Carya illinoinensis. They mine the leaves of their host plant.
