= Altina (film) =

2014 documentary film

- Directed by: Peter Sanders
- Produced by: Peter Sanders; Victoria Sanders; Diane Dickensheid
- Release date: September 12, 2014 (location)
- Running time: 80 minutes

Altina is a 2014 documentary about the life of artist Altina Schinasi. The film was directed by Peter Sanders, her paternal grandson.

== Release ==
Altina was released on IFC on September 12, 2014.

== Reception ==
Variety wrote, "Once in fuller focus, "Altina" makes for loose, exasperating but oddly endearing viewing." The Los Angeles Times wrote the documentary, "is an absorbing look at wealth, privilege, and creativity and progressive thinking."
