= Coptodisca matheri =

Scientific classification
- Domain: Eukaryota
- Kingdom: Animalia
- Phylum: Arthropoda
- Class: Insecta
- Order: Lepidoptera
- Family: Heliozelidae
- Genus: Coptodisca
- Species: C. matheri

Binomial name
- Coptodisca matheri Lafontaine, 1974

Species of moth

Coptodisca matheri is a moth of the family Heliozelidae. It was described by J. Donald Lafontaine in 1974. It is found in Mississippi.

The wingspan is 4.1-4.3 mm. The forewings are silvery white in the basal half and light yellow at the apical half. The hindwings are whitish grey.

The larvae feed on Vaccinium arboreum. They mine the leaves of their host plant. The mine starts at the base of the leaf and has the form of a serpentine gallery which usually follows the leaf margin. Later, it widens into an elongate blotch. The beginning of the mine is completely filled with frass.
