= William Tuthill =

American architect (1855–1929)

- Born: William Burnet Tuthill; February 11, 1855; Hoboken, New Jersey, U.S.
- Died: August 25, 1929 (aged 74); Manhattan, New York, U.S.
- Education: College of the City of New York
- Occupation: Architect
- Spouse: Henrietta Elizabeth Corwin
- Children: Burnet Tuthill
- Buildings: Carnegie Hall

William Burnet Tuthill (February 11, 1855 – August 25, 1929) was an American architect celebrated for designing New York City's Carnegie Hall.

== Early life, education and family ==
William Burnet Tuthill was born on February 11, 1855, in Hoboken, New Jersey, the son of George Flavius Tuthill and Jane Louise Price. Tuthill graduated from the College of the City of New York in 1875. He trained in the office of Richard Morris Hunt and in 1878 set up practice for himself in the city. He was later granted an M.A. degree.

Tuthill married Henrietta Elizabeth Corwin (October 15, 1852 – March 11, 1917), an accomplished pianist and organist. When Henrietta was seventeen she was the organist for the First Presbyterian Church in her hometown Newburgh, New York. William and Henrietta met at Calvary Baptist Church in New York City, where he sang in the choir and she was the church organist. Their only child, Burnet Corwin Tuthill (November 16, 1888 – January 18, 1982), became a clarinetist and composer.

== Professional life ==
William B. Tuthill was a founder of the Architectural League of New York and served on the Art Commission of the Columbian Exposition at Chicago in 1893. He lectured on architectural history and acoustics for Columbia University, the University of Cincinnati, and the New York City Board of Education. He served for thirty-six years as secretary and manager of the Oratorio Society of New York.

== Carnegie Hall ==
William B. Tuthill is best remembered as the architect of Carnegie Hall in New York City. Tuthill was a talented amateur cellist and served as a board member of the Oratorio Society of New York along with Andrew Carnegie. This led to his receiving the commission to design the Music Hall that would be funded by and eventually bear Carnegie's name. The acoustics are celebrated, due to Tuthill's extensive study of European concert halls as well as what has been called his "golden ear".

Carnegie Hall opened in 1891 with composer Peter Tchaikovsky conducting the New York Philharmonic and the Oratorio Society of New York. During the performance, Tuthill reportedly left the hall to consult his drawings, to be certain that the supporting columns would withstand the weight of the crowd in attendance.

== Architectural work (partial list) ==
- 1889 The A. T. Demarest Building, 335 Fifth Ave and 33rd St., NY
- 1889–1891 Carnegie Hall (with Richard Morris Hunt; assistance from Louis Sullivan and Dankmar Adler)
- 1890 The Columbia Yacht Club
- 1890 YWCA Building, Harlem, NY
- 1893 The Princeton Inn, Princeton, New Jersey
- 1893 The Arnold C. Saportus Residence, Pocantico Hills, NY
- 1893 First Baptist Church, Red Bank NJ
- 1893 New York Post Graduate Medical College and Hospital, 101 Street W, NY
- 1896 Munsey Office Building (now, The Mohican), 281 State Street, New London, CT
- 1897 The McEvers Bayard Brown Cottage at The Jekyll Island Club, GA
- 1899 The James Hooker Hamersley Mansion on the northeast corner of 84th and Fifth (demolished in 1924 for the present 1030 Fifth Avenue).
- 1900 Woodycrest, 936 Woodycrest Avenue, Bronx, NY
- 1909 The Morris Schinasi Residence, 351 Riverside Drive at 107th St., NYC
- 1918 Alterations to the Church of the Messiah in New York

Tuthill also designed the Women's Medical College at the New York, Infirmary on 101st Street near Manhattan Avenue, in New York and a row of extant townhouses along 122nd Street near Mount Morris (now Marcus Garvey) Park in Harlem.

== Writings and later years ==
Tuthill was the author of a number of books including:

- The Suburban Cottage (1891)
- The Cathedral Church of England (1923)

William B. Tuthill died in 1929. The architect is reported to have left an estate of $5,000.
