= Coptodisca condaliae =

Scientific classification
- Domain: Eukaryota
- Kingdom: Animalia
- Phylum: Arthropoda
- Class: Insecta
- Order: Lepidoptera
- Family: Heliozelidae
- Genus: Coptodisca
- Species: C. condaliae

Binomial name
- Coptodisca condaliae Busck, 1900

Species of moth

Coptodisca condaliae is a moth of the family Heliozelidae. It was described by August Busck in 1900. It is found in Florida.
