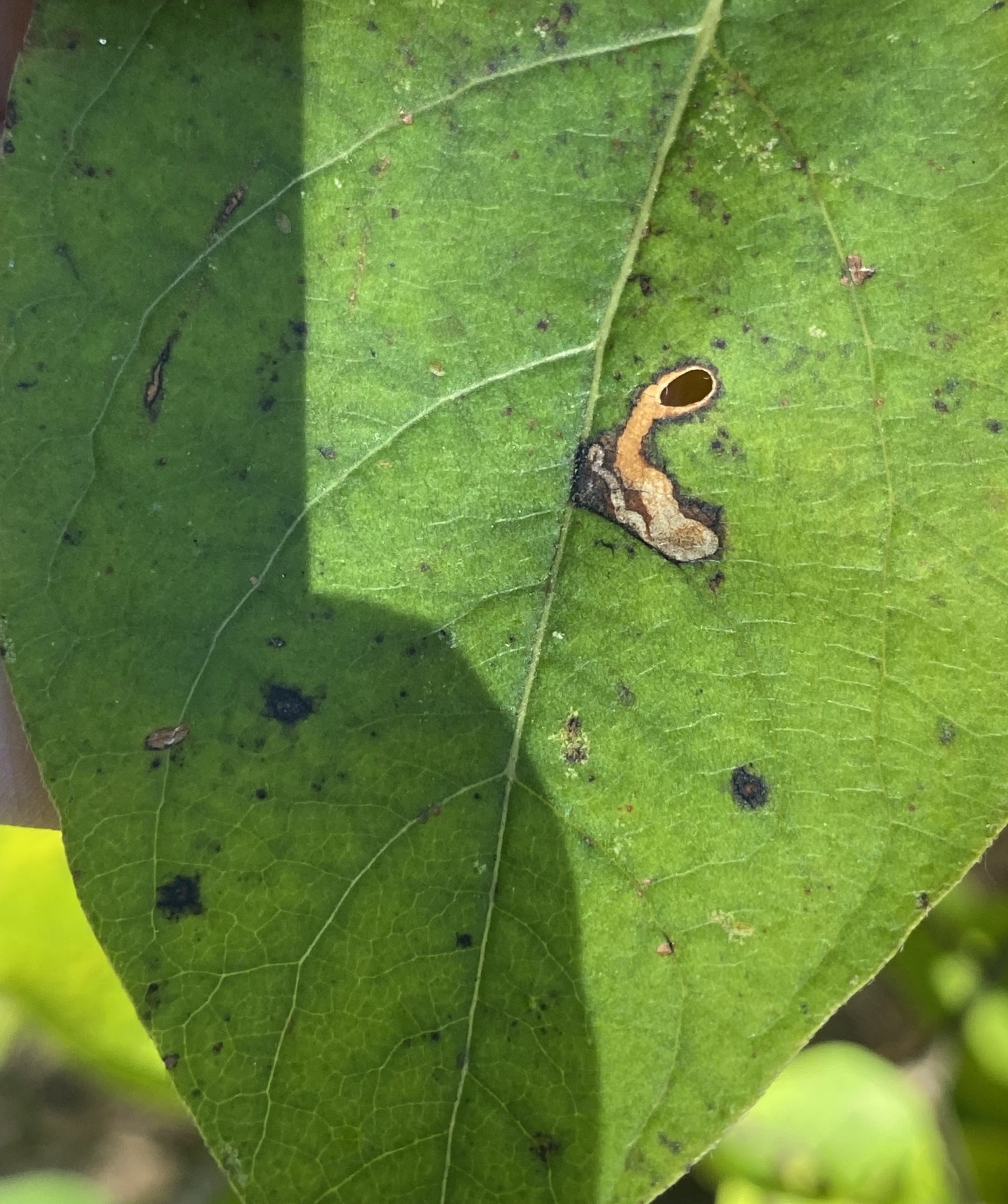
- Leaf mine on Diospyros virginiana

Scientific classification
- Kingdom: Animalia
- Phylum: Arthropoda
- Clade: Pancrustacea
- Class: Insecta
- Order: Lepidoptera
- Family: Heliozelidae
- Genus: Coptodisca
- Species: C. diospyriella

Binomial name
- Coptodisca diospyriella (Chambers, 1874)

Synonyms
- Aspidisca diospyriella Chambers, 1874

= Coptodisca diospyriella =

Species of moth

Coptodisca diospyriella is a moth of the family Heliozelidae. It was described by Vactor Tousey Chambers in 1874. It is found in North America, including Florida, Kentucky and Ohio.

The larvae feed on Diospyros species. They mine the leaves of their host plant.
