= Coptodisca ribesella =

Scientific classification
- Domain: Eukaryota
- Kingdom: Animalia
- Phylum: Arthropoda
- Class: Insecta
- Order: Lepidoptera
- Family: Heliozelidae
- Genus: Coptodisca
- Species: C. ribesella

Binomial name
- Coptodisca ribesella Braun, 1925

Species of moth

Coptodisca ribesella is a moth of the family Heliozelidae. It was described by Annette Frances Braun in 1925. It is found in the US state of California.
