= Coptodisca rhizophorae =

Scientific classification
- Domain: Eukaryota
- Kingdom: Animalia
- Phylum: Arthropoda
- Class: Insecta
- Order: Lepidoptera
- Family: Heliozelidae
- Genus: Coptodisca
- Species: C. rhizophorae

Binomial name
- Coptodisca rhizophorae Walsingham, 1897

Species of moth

Coptodisca rhizophorae is a moth of the family Heliozelidae. It was described by Walsingham in 1897. It is found in the West Indies.
