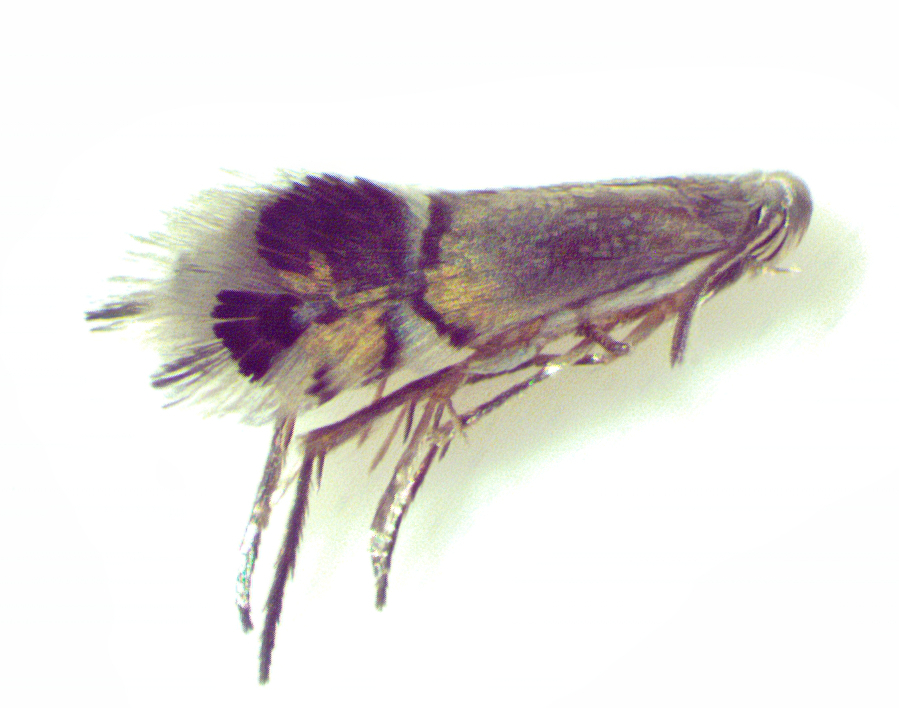

Scientific classification
- Kingdom: Animalia
- Phylum: Arthropoda
- Clade: Pancrustacea
- Class: Insecta
- Order: Lepidoptera
- Family: Heliozelidae
- Genus: Coptodisca
- Species: C. splendoriferella

Binomial name
- Coptodisca splendoriferella (Clemens, 1860)

Synonyms
- Aspidisca splendoriferella Clemens, 1860; Aspidisca pruniella Clemens, 1861; Lyonetia saccatella Packard, 1889

= Coptodisca splendoriferella =

Resplendent shield bearer

Species of moth

Coptodisca splendoriferella, the resplendent shield bearer, is a moth of the family Heliozelidae. It was described by James Brackenridge Clemens in 1860. It is found in North America, including California, Ohio and South Carolina.
