= Spencer H. Curtis =

British merchant (1833–1913)

Spencer Henry Curtis
- Born: 11 July 1833; Eaton Square, London, England
- Died: 26 February 1913 (aged 79); Earl's Court, London, England
- Occupation: Merchant
- Spouse: Margaret Tupper Carey (m. 1864; died 1899)

Spencer Henry Curtis (11 July 1833 – 26 February 1913) was an English merchant, associated with companies that traded with the West Indies.

== Early life and family ==
Curtis was born on 11 July 1833, the son of Charles Berwick Curtis, of 105 Eaton Square, London.

On 17 August 1864, Curtis married Margaret Tupper Carey, eldest daughter of De Vic Carey, of Guernsey, at St Martin's Parish Church, Guernsey. Her brother, the sea captain Charles James Carey, died at Curtis's former home, Totteridge House in north London, in 1891.

== Career ==
Curtis began his career in the City of London around 1854, with the firm of Bosanquet & Madden, a firm of West Indian merchants, with interests in British Guiana and Jamaica. In 1801, upon the retirement of Bosanquet senior, he became a partner. The firm was subsequently called Hogg, Curtis, Campbell, and Co., and, then Curtis, Campbell, and Co.

For over 45 years, Curtis was a director of the Colonial Bank, an institution with extensive trading interests in the West Indies. In 1878, he became a director of the Royal Mail Steam Packet Company, which was originally formed to conduct the mail service of the West Indies. He was also a director of the Indemnity Marine Assurance Company and a member of the Executive and treasurer of the West India Committee.

In May 1881, not long after Mary Seacole's death, Curtis wrote to the editor of The Times, asking that Mary's sister in Jamaica be remembered as she had fallen into near poverty after being too generous with her money.

== Official appointments ==
Curtis was a magistrate for Hertfordshire and Middlesex.

== Death ==
Curtis died from heart failure at 24 Longridge Road, London, on 26 February 1913.
