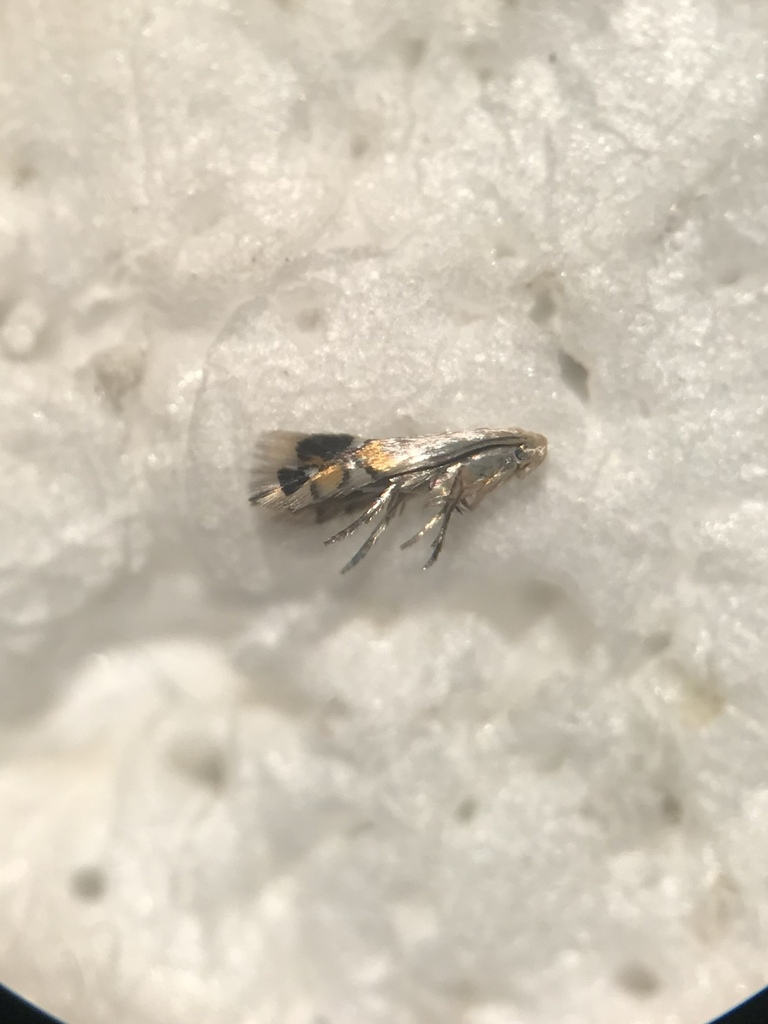

Scientific classification
- Kingdom: Animalia
- Phylum: Arthropoda
- Clade: Pancrustacea
- Class: Insecta
- Order: Lepidoptera
- Family: Heliozelidae
- Genus: Coptodisca
- Species: C. ostryaefoliella

Binomial name
- Coptodisca ostryaefoliella Clemens, 1861

Synonyms
- Aspidisca ostryaefoliella Clemens, 1861

= Coptodisca ostryaefoliella =

Species of moth

Coptodisca ostryaefoliella is a moth of the family Heliozelidae. It was described by James Brackenridge Clemens in 1861. It is found in North America, including Ohio.
