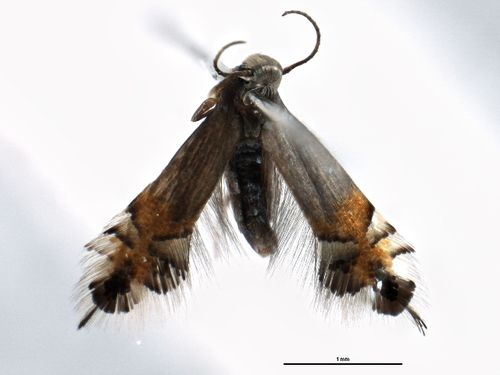

Scientific classification
- Kingdom: Animalia
- Phylum: Arthropoda
- Clade: Pancrustacea
- Class: Insecta
- Order: Lepidoptera
- Family: Heliozelidae
- Genus: Coptodisca
- Species: C. cercocarpella

Binomial name
- Coptodisca cercocarpella Braun, 1925

= Coptodisca cercocarpella =

Curl-leaf mountain mahogany leafminer

Species of moth

Coptodisca cercocarpella, the curl-leaf mountain mahogany leafminer, is a moth of the family Heliozelidae. It was described by Annette Frances Braun in 1925. It is found in North America, including Arizona, California, Utah and Colorado.
