= Coptodisca ella =

Scientific classification
- Kingdom: Animalia
- Phylum: Arthropoda
- Clade: Pancrustacea
- Class: Insecta
- Order: Lepidoptera
- Family: Heliozelidae
- Genus: Coptodisca
- Species: C. ella

Binomial name
- Coptodisca ella Chambers, 1871

Synonyms
- Aspidisca ella Chambers, 1871

Species of moth

Coptodisca ella is a moth of the family Heliozelidae. It was described by Vactor Tousey Chambers in 1871. It is found in North America, including Tennessee.

The larvae feed on Carya species. They mine the leaves of their host plant.
