= Altina Schinasi =

American sculptor, entrepreneur, film creator, inventor (1907–1999)

- Born: August 4, 1907; New York, New York, U.S.
- Died: August 19, 1999 (aged 92); Santa Fe, New Mexico, U.S.
- Notable work: Sculptor Harlequin eyeglass frame George Grosz' Interregnum (1960)
- Father: Morris Schinasi
- Awards: American Design Award from Lord & Taylor; 1939; George Grosz' Interregnum Venice Film Festival, Golden Lion, First Prize; 1961 George Grosz' Interregnum
- Patrons: Clare Boothe Luce

Altina Schinasi (August 4, 1907 – August 19, 1999) was an American sculptor, filmmaker, actress, entrepreneur, window dresser, designer, and inventor. She was known for designing what she called the "Harlequin eyeglass frame", popularly known as cat-eye glasses.

== Early life ==
Altina Schinasi was the youngest child born to the Schinasi family in the US. Her father, Morris Schinasi, was a Sephardic Jew born in Manisa, Turkey whose wealth stemmed from the international fine tobacco business. Altina's mother, Laurette Schinasi née Ben Rubi, the granddaughter of Schinasi's business associate Joseph Ben Rubi, was a native of Salonica, then in the Ottoman Empire. Altina was born at the Schinasi Mansion on Manhattan's Upper West Side on August 4, 1907. After being tutored at home, Altina attended Horace Mann School and at the age of twelve left home to board at Dana Hall School in Wellesley, Massachusetts.

Upon Morris Schinasi's death in 1928, his widow Laurette Schinasi travelled to Manisa, Turkey to establish Moris Sinasi Çocuk Hastahanesi, or Moris Sinasi Children's Hospital in the city of her late husband's birth. It remains in operation today. Laurette took Altina and her sister to Paris shortly after her graduation from Dana Hall. There, Altina studied painting with her cousin, René Bensussan. While spending more time with Bensussan, she developed a deeper appreciation for art, and as a result, Altina chose to attend art school rather than college when she returned to the United States. In New York, Altina studied with Samuel Halpert at the Roerich Museum.

In 1928, Altina Schinasi married her first husband, noted architect Morris B. Sanders Jr., in a home ceremony that was featured in Architect magazine. They would have two sons, Terry Sanders and Denis Sanders, both of whom would become film directors.

== Window dresser ==
Altina took a job with Peter Copeland designing windows for Fifth Avenue stores. It was in this job that she found herself working alongside Salvador Dalí, who had been commissioned to design two Bonwit Teller windows. Altina worked in the Copeland workshop to build the windows that Dalí designed.

George Grosz, a German artist that Altina had long admired, settled in New York after fleeing Hitler's regime in 1932. Though he taught intermittently on the faculty of the Art Students League, Altina, now in her twenties and a divorced mother of two, studied with Grosz at the school that Grosz set up with painter Maurice Sterne. In Grosz' classes, Altina again encountered Salvador Dalí who came to make use of the model.

== Harlequin glasses frame ==
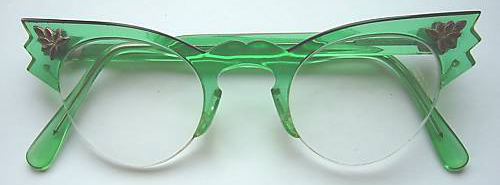
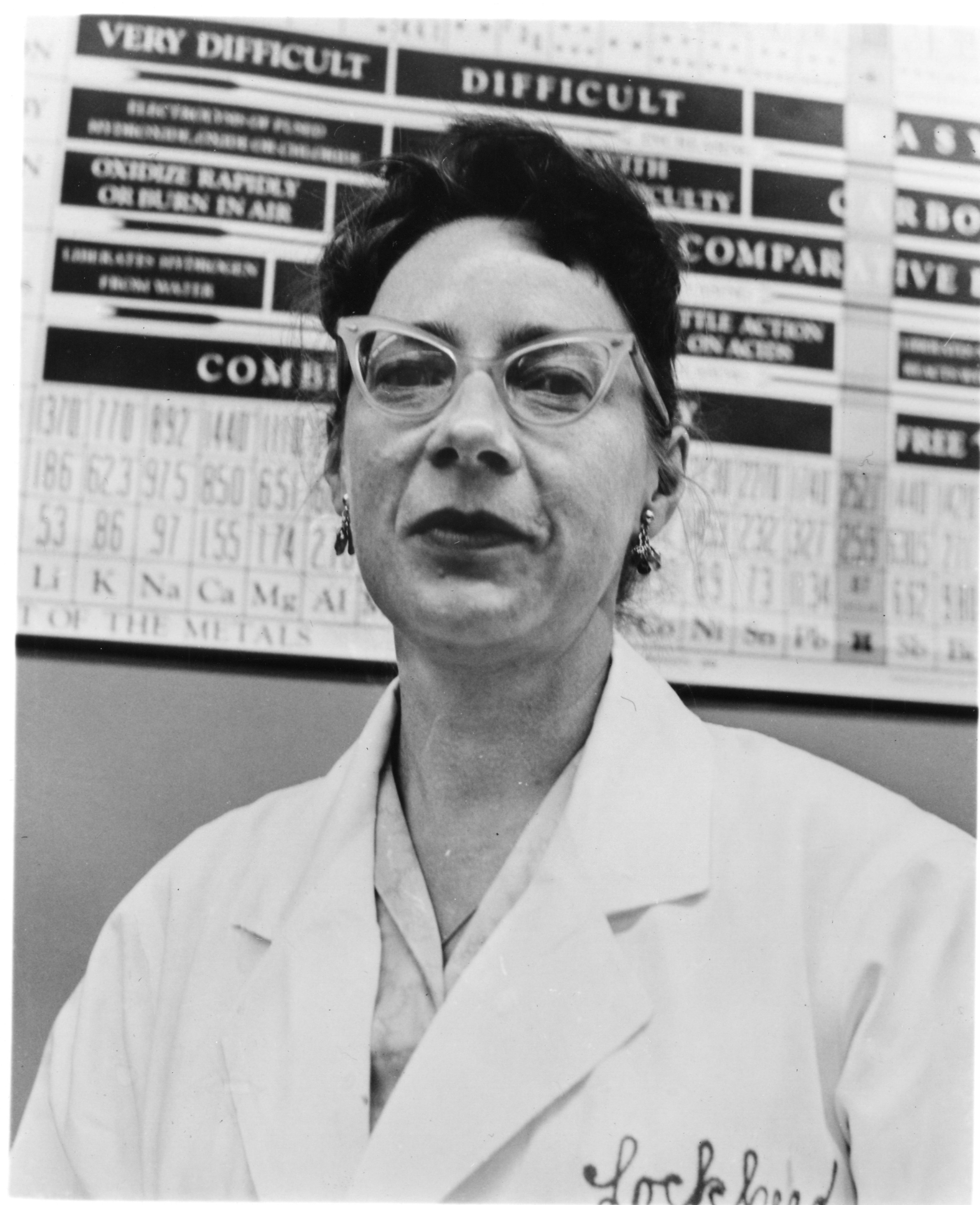
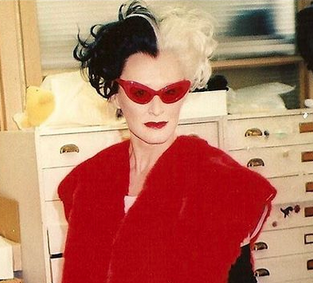
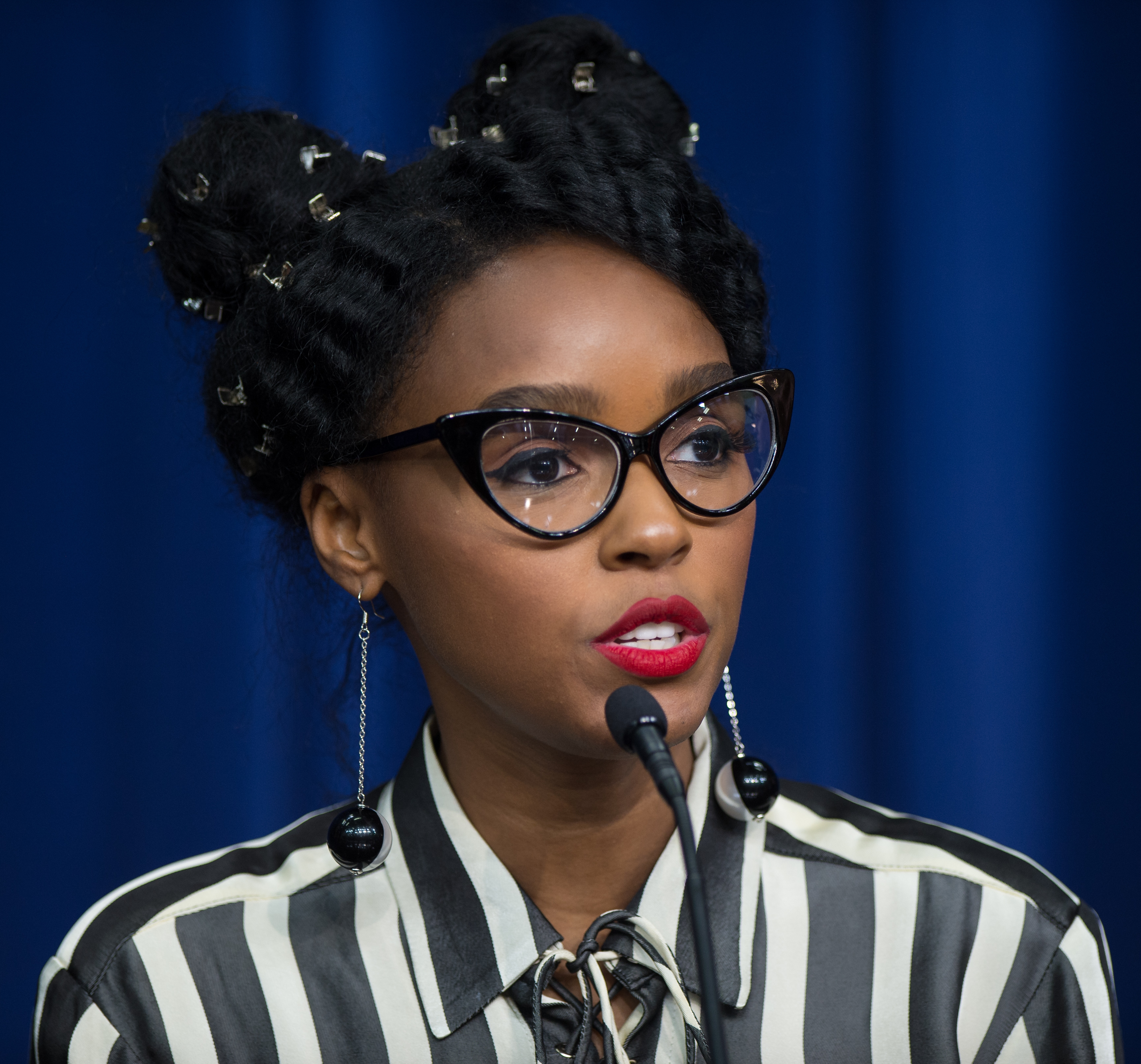
Harlequin glasses and examples of them being worn (from left to right) in the 1960s, 1990s, and 2010s.

Though she would continue to register patents for inventions until late in life, Schinasi's breakthrough came early on when she created and marketed the Harlequin eyeglass frame that defined glamour in the late 1930s. A walk down the street occasioned this design breakthrough; finding herself underwhelmed by the lacklustre frames in an optician's window, Altina set out to create a frame that conveyed whimsy, mystery and romance.

"Surely, there must be some way to design eyeglasses that could be attractive! What looks good on a face? What adds to a face? What could a woman wear on her face that would be romantic?" she wondered. Altina took inspiration from Venetian Harlequin masks as a starting point and began to cut masks into the frames she envisioned. Schinasi approached all of the major manufacturers with her creation — all of which rejected her, claiming her design was too edgy.

Once she had set up production and negotiated deals with department stores, Schinasi opened an office where she oversaw marketing and distribution, later expanding her operation to the West Coast upon relocating to California. In 1939, Schinasi won the Lord & Taylor Annual American Design Award for her avant-garde transformation of the eyeglass frame into a proper fashion accessory. Vogue and Life magazines credited Schinasi with revolutionising the eyewear industry and aesthetic.

== California years ==
In the 1940s, with hopes of spending more time on her art, Schinasi moved west to Los Angeles first expanding and finally selling her eyeglass business. She had by this time married Viennese doctor and classical pianist Eric Barrett. The move away from her business and New York allowed for a new level of commitment to her art. Having begun studies with Howard Warshaw at the Jepson School of Art in Los Angeles, Schinasi said, "I took a room in the house as my studio and put a sign on the door: 'Do not come in unless there's a catastrophe.' I wanted to have three hours a day just to myself without interruption, and I really did work very hard." Schinasi began to paint in earnest and her large paintings were selected for the Los Angeles County Museum of Art (LACMA) juried show. In Los Angeles, Schinasi spent many years as a volunteer art therapist and muralist at the experimental mental health centre, Synanon.

== George Grosz' Interregnum (1960) ==
It was in California that Schinasi conceptualized and produced George Grosz' Interregnum, a short documentary film that features the anti-Nazi work of the celebrated artist and Schinasi's former teacher. With George Grosz’s permission, given in a contract which Grosz wrote by hand on a napkin, Schinasi created a film of his drawings shot on sixteen-millimetre film. Grosz' book, A Big No and a Little Yes was the source of the narrated text read by Lotte Lenya. George Grosz' Interregnum was nominated for an Academy Award and won First Prize at the Venice Film Festival. Schinasi is credited as producer under the name Altina Carey, her married name at that time (she had married Charles Carey after the death of her second husband from tuberculosis). The film was preserved by the Academy Film Archive in 2013.

== March on Washington ==
Following the success of George Grosz' Interregnum, Schinasi found herself drawn to Martin Luther King Jr.'s March on Washington, to which she acquired film rights. Schinasi engaged author John Oliver Killens to write the screenplay. When Killens had completed the script, Schinasi met with Dr. King in Atlanta to deliver the script. At Dr. King's invitation, she visited Savior Church in Montgomery, Alabama where Dr. Martin Luther King, Sr. was the pastor and Dr. King Jr. was the guest preacher that Sunday. From the pulpit, Dr. King Jr. told the congregation about the script and how he looked forward to the movie. While in Alabama, Schinasi met Rosa Parks and taped an interview with Rev. Ralph Abernathy. Vittorio De Sica, the Italian director of the Bicycle Thieves, expressed interest in directing the film. However, Schinasi found it impossible to secure funding for the film, even from politically sympathetic potential investors, and the film was never made.

== Chairacters ==
While looking at Henri Cartier-Bresson's photograph of unoccupied chairs, Schinasi was inspired to combine the function of the seat with the form of the sitter. She called these fantastic chairs and benches "chairacters". Schinasi first worked the core in Styrofoam and then sculpted the form in plaster. The fibreglass casts that were the final product were made of the sculpted prototype at a studio and factory in California. Her chairacters were featured on the cover of the Los Angeles Times Magazine.

In 1973, Schinasi relocated to Washington D.C. where she would live for seventeen years. In 1978, she was interviewed by Pam Peabody at WPFW-Washington, D.C. about her 1978 exhibit at the Touchstone Gallery, as well as her life, work, and experience at Synanon. While at work on the chairacters, Schinasi's studio assistant left and she hired Celestino Miranda, who had recently arrived in the United States, after seeking asylum from Cuba. When Schinasi travelled to Santa Fe for the summer, Miranda accompanied her there. A gifted artist in his own right, Celestino would prove a great collaborator and an inspiration. They returned to Washington at the summer's end. The pair married in 1981.

== Later years ==
Schinasi continued to paint and sculpt, establishing herself in Santa Fe, New Mexico, where she lived with her fourth husband, painter Celestino Miranda, in her final years. In 2014, her granddaughter, Victoria Sanders, produced a well-received documentary about her life entitled Altina.

== Legacy ==
The association of harlequin eyeglasses with female eyewear became and remains so strong that cartoonist Gary Larson has routinely used them to identify human and animal characters as adult females rather than males or juveniles.

== Sources ==
- Schinasi Miranda, Altina. The Road I Have Traveled. Santa Fe: Apodaca Hill Press, 1995
- "Altina Schinasi Miranda, 92, Designer of Harlequin Glasses". The New York Times. 1999-08-21.
- "The 33rd Academy Awards (1961) Nominees and Winners". Archived from the original on 6 July 2011.
- "Altina Trailer".
