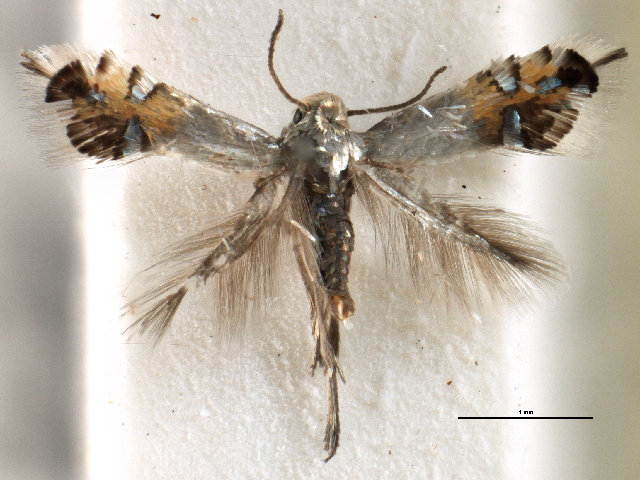

Scientific classification
- Kingdom: Animalia
- Phylum: Arthropoda
- Class: Insecta
- Order: Lepidoptera
- Family: Heliozelidae
- Genus: Coptodisca
- Species: C. powellella

Binomial name
- Coptodisca powellella Opler, 1971

= Coptodisca powellella =

Species of moth

Coptodisca powellella is a moth of the family Heliozelidae. It was described by Paul A. Opler in 1971. It is found in California.

The larvae feed on Quercus agrifolia. They mine the leaves of their host plant.
