= Madrona Island =

Island in British Columbia, Canada

Coordinates: 50°36′30″N 126°38′13″W

Madrona Island, formerly also known as Arbutus Island, is an island in the Carey Group, located southeast of Crease Island in the Johnstone Strait region of the Central Coast of British Columbia, Canada.

== Name origin ==
Madrona comes from the Spanish language madroño, referring to any of several evergreen trees (genus Arbutus) of the heath family. The Pacific Arbutus is common throughout the South Coast of British Columbia.

== See also ==
- List of islands of British Columbia
- Madrona (disambiguation)
