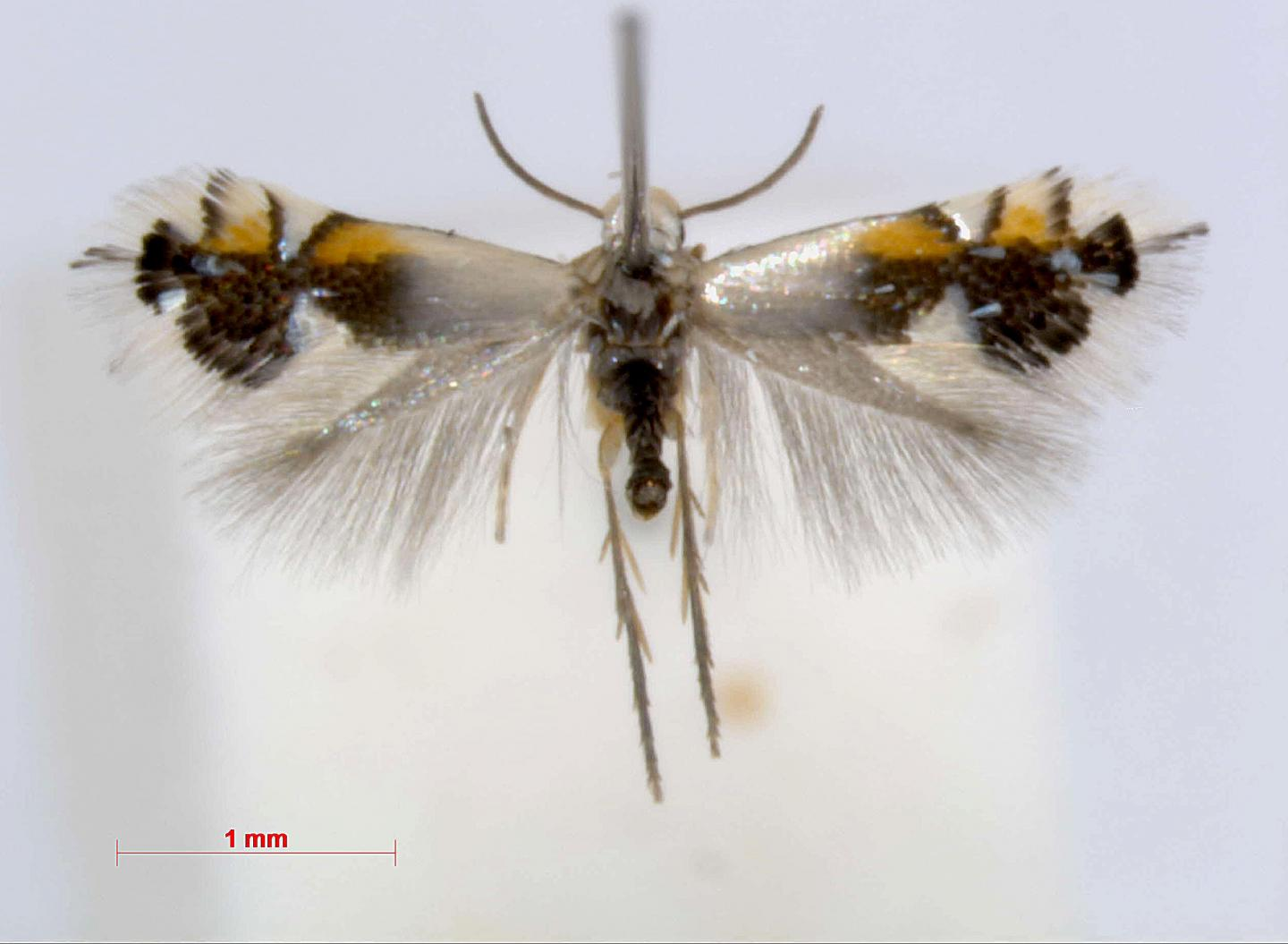
- Coptodisca lucifluella

Scientific classification
- Domain: Eukaryota
- Kingdom: Animalia
- Phylum: Arthropoda
- Class: Insecta
- Order: Lepidoptera
- Family: Heliozelidae
- Genus: Coptodisca; Walsingham, 1895

Synonyms
- Aspidisca Clemens, 1860 (preocc. Ehrenberg, 1830)

= Coptodisca =

Genus of moths

Coptodisca is genus of moths of the family Heliozelidae. It was described by Thomas de Grey, 6th Baron Walsingham, in 1895.

== Species ==
- Coptodisca arbutiella (madrone shield bearer)
- Coptodisca cercocarpella (curl-leaf mountain mahogany leafminer)
- Coptodisca condaliae
- Coptodisca diospyriella
- Coptodisca ella
- Coptodisca juglandella
- Coptodisca kalmiella
- Coptodisca lucifluella
- Coptodisca magnella
- Coptodisca matheri
- Coptodisca negligens
- Coptodisca ostryaefoliella
- Coptodisca powellella
- Coptodisca quercicolella
- Coptodisca rhizophorae
- Coptodisca ribesella
- Coptodisca saliciella
- Coptodisca splendoriferella (resplendent shield bearer)
