= Schinasi House =

Historic house in Manhattan, New York

- U.S. National Register of Historic Places
- New York State Register of Historic Places
- New York City Landmark
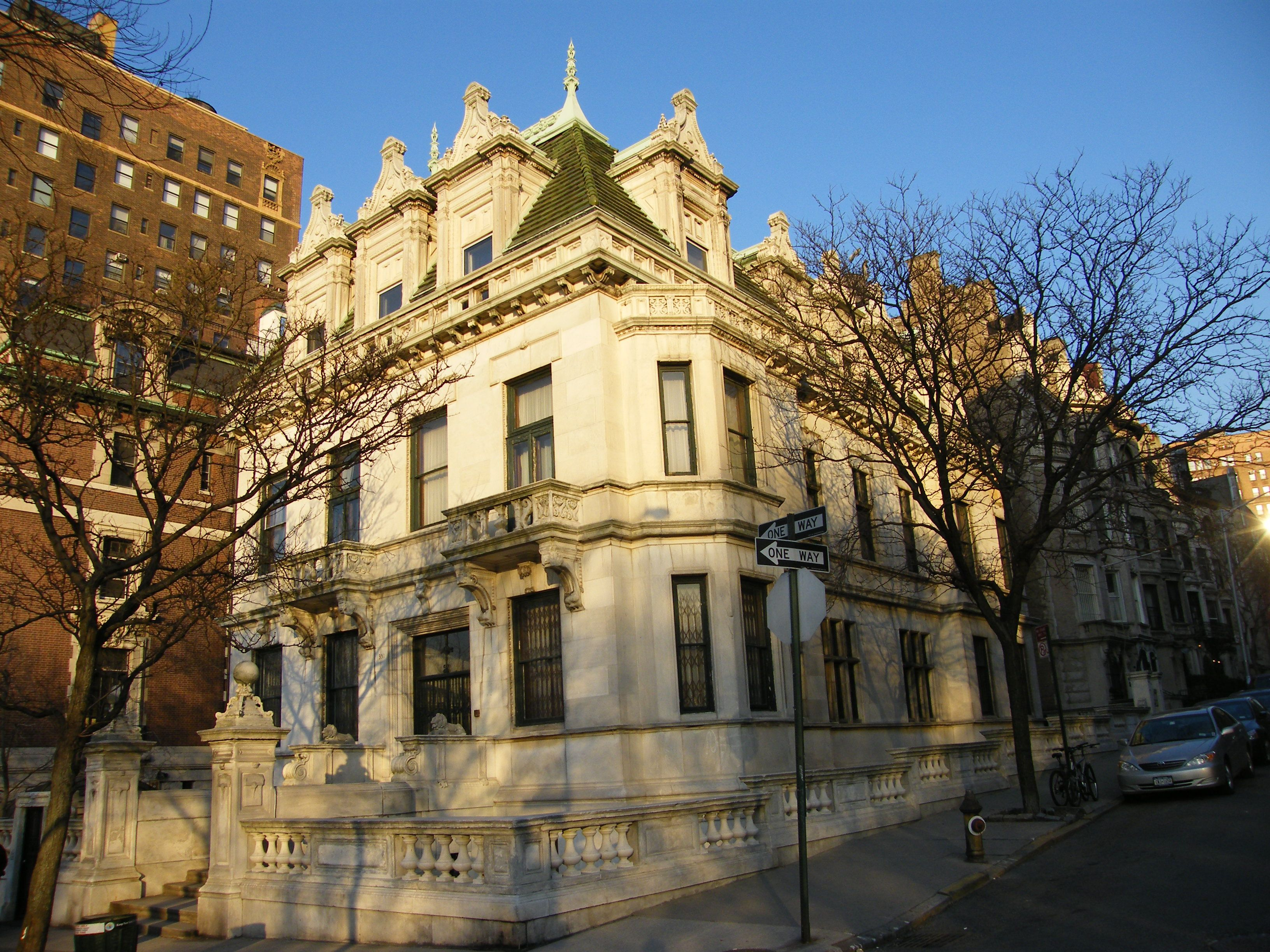
- Seen in 2009
- Location: 351 Riverside Drive, Manhattan, New York, US
- Coordinates: 40°48′11″N 73°58′09″W
- Built: 1908–1909
- Architect: William Tuthill
- Architectural style: Neo–French Renaissance
- NRHP reference No.: 80002714
- NYSRHP No.: 06101.001764
- NYCL No.: 0844

Significant dates
- Added to NRHP: April 23, 1980
- Designated NYSRHP: June 23, 1980
- Designated NYCL: March 19, 1974

The Schinasi House (also Schinasi Residence or Schinasi Mansion) is a residence at 351 Riverside Drive, at the northeast corner with West 107th Street, on the Upper West Side of Manhattan in New York City, New York, US. It was built in 1907 for the tobacco baron Morris Schinasi. Completed in 1909, it was designed in the neo–French Renaissance style by William Tuthill. It is one of the last remaining detached single-family houses in Manhattan that is still used as a residence. The house has a marble facade with decorations such as balconies, oriel windows, and dormers. The 12,000-square-foot (1,100 m^{2}) interior was originally subdivided into 35 rooms. The structure is designated a New York City Landmark and is listed on the National Register of Historic Places.

The Schinasi House was used as a single-family home for its first two decades. After Schinasi died in 1928, his heirs sold the house to Semple Realty Corporation in 1930 for use as a girls' finishing school. In 1960, it was sold to Columbia University for use as a daycare center; it was also used for classrooms during the mid-1960s. Hans Smit, a Columbia University law professor, bought it in 1979 and conducted an extensive interior restoration. Since 2013, it has been owned by Mark Schwartz, a Goldman Sachs executive.

== Site ==
The Schinasi House is located at 351 Riverside Drive, on the Upper West Side of Manhattan in New York City, New York, US. The site is located at the northeast corner with 107th Street, across from Riverside Park. It occupies a rectangular land lot of 5,983 square feet (555.8 m^{2}), with a frontage of 59.83 feet (18.24 m) on Riverside Drive to the west and 100 feet (30 m) on 107th Street to the south. The house has Italian gardens, containing plantings on all sides. The gardens around the house cover about 3,500 square feet (330 m^{2}). Such side gardens are uncommon on Riverside Drive, where buildings are typically placed directly against each other.

Immediately to the north are two townhouses at 352 and 353 Riverside Drive along with a 14-story apartment building. The Schinasi House abuts the side garden of 352 Riverside Drive. The houses of the Riverside–West 105th Street Historic District are located one block south, and there are apartment buildings and late 19th- or early 20th-century houses on the surrounding blocks. Farther south along Riverside Drive are 294 Riverside Drive (built 1901) and the Master Apartments (built 1929).

The Schinasi House is a freestanding structure. It was one of several freestanding mansions built along Riverside Drive and Park in the late 19th and early 20th centuries, at a time when developers envisioned Riverside Drive as a rival to the millionaires' row on Fifth Avenue. The prediction for this kind of development never reached its full potential; the largest single-family residence along Riverside Drive at the time was Charles M. Schwab's mansion, "Riverside", which occupied a full block and was later demolished. By the early 21st century, the Schinasi House was one of two remaining freestanding mansions on Riverside Drive, along with the Isaac L. Rice Mansion.

== Architecture ==
The Schinasi House was designed by William Tuthill, who patterned it after a French chateau in the neo-French-Renaissance style. The building is relatively small compared with other mansions. It measures 2 1/2 stories high and occupies only about 41 feet (12 m) of its total width. It has a rectangular general plan, although parts of the facade protrude or are recessed from this general shape.

=== Facade ===
The facade is made of marble, (Note: A 2015 report from the New York City Landmarks Preservation Commission describes the house as being composed of limestone, but this conflicts with an earlier LPC report and the National Register of Historic Places nomination, which describes it as a marble building.) with four elevations that are all designed slightly differently from each other. The building is surrounded by a marble parapet with a balustrade interspersed by newel posts or piers. Stained glass windows are used throughout the facade, and the original owner, Morris Schinasi, had water taps installed on the facade so it could be washed easily. The exterior details, such as cornices and carvings, were intended to draw attention to specific parts of the facade.

The western elevation on Riverside Drive has the main doorway. The doorway is accessed by a stoop flanked by sidewalls, which, at their sidewalk ends, are topped by square piers. The stairways were originally flanked by guardian lions. The doors themselves are made of bronze and are housed within a bronze doorway. The bays immediately flanking the doorway have balconies on their second stories, which have ornate decorations. The balconies rest on a horizontal band course that wraps around the building. The entryway and windows are topped by splayed lintels.

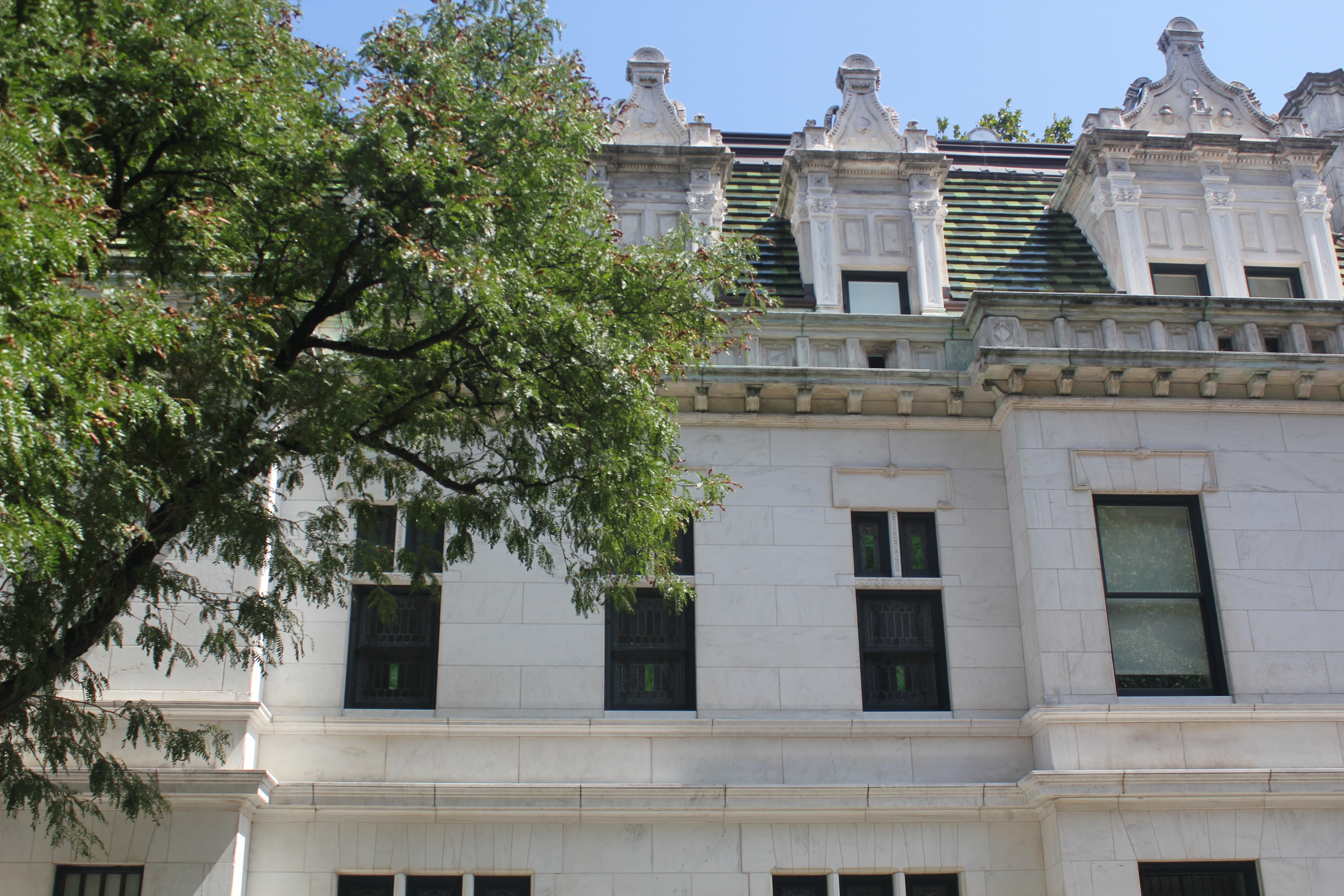
Upper stories as seen from the south elevation

The southern elevation on 107th Street contains a recessed center section; its windows have stone vertical mullions and horizontal transoms. The southern elevation's end pavilions protrude slightly, and there is a protruding two-story bay in the western pavilion, which has a parapet above it. At the eastern end of the house, a pair of stone piers flank an iron gate leading to a terrace east of the house. The east (rear) elevation has a chimney. The eastern elevation's tripartite first-story window contains stone vertical mullions and horizontal transoms, while at the east elevation's second story is a three-sided copper oriel window. The northern elevation, which faces 352 Riverside Drive, has more ornate decorations than the other elevations. This elevation has a wide central bay at the first story, which has a steep roof to the left (east) and a series of windows to the right (west). The northern elevation also has a two-story oriel at its eastern (rear) end.

There are decorative details such as pineapple motifs, seen as a symbol of hospitality. Tobacco leaves were added in reference to the occupation of Morris Schinasi, a tobacco magnate. Just below the roof is a frieze and a cornice with modillions. The roof is pitched and is covered with terracotta tiles; there are a pair of finials and cresting above the roof on the western elevation. A 1908 bulletin announcing the house's construction described the roof as being made of "terracotta and tile, with steel girders and copper cornices". Protruding from the roof are dormer windows with pilasters to either side, and curved pediments above; the upper sections of the pilasters have stone panels. The dormers themselves have cresting.

=== Interior ===
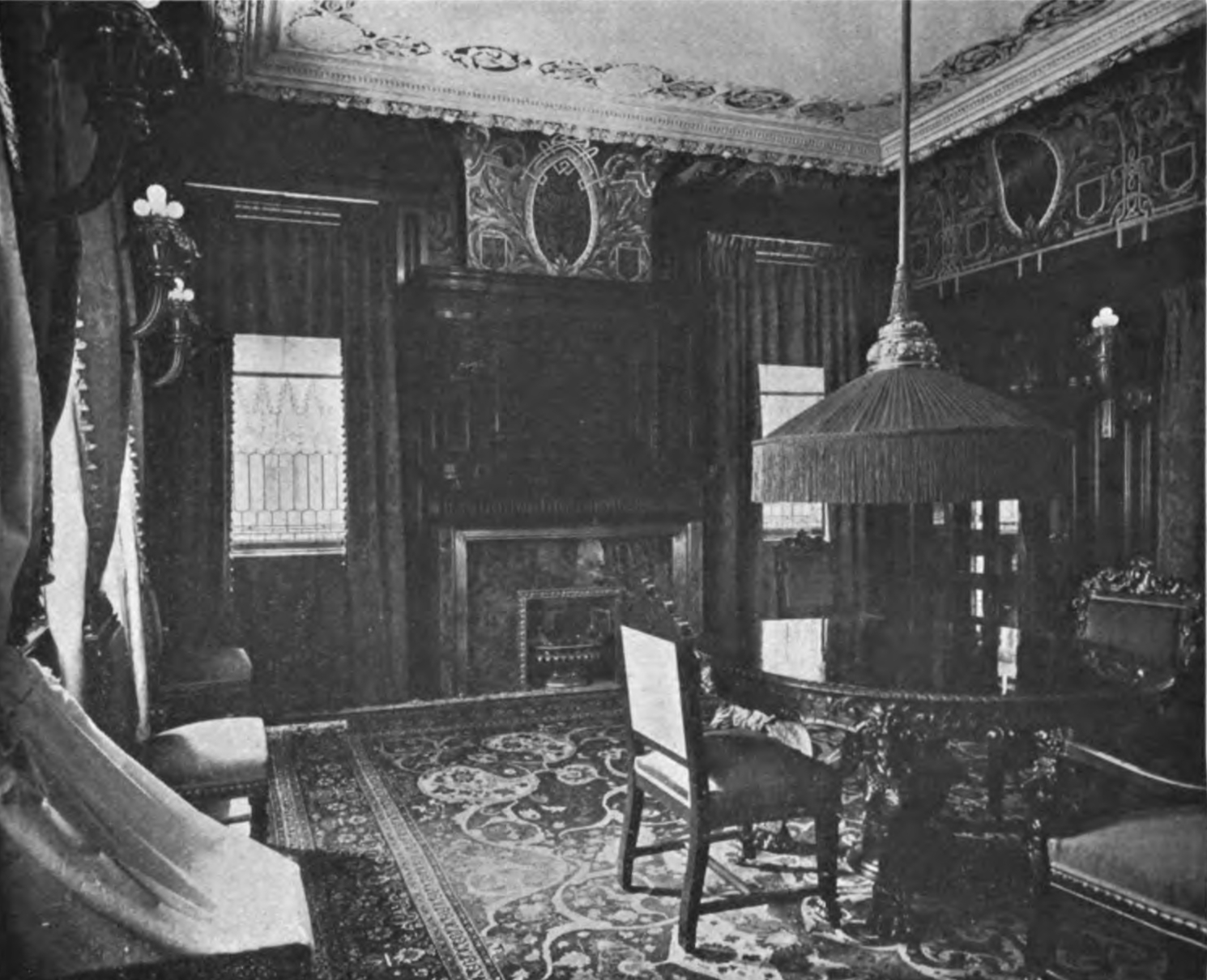
Contemporary image of the dining room (1909)

The house spans 12,000 square feet (1,100 m^{2}); the New York City Department of City Planning gives a gross floor area of 12,112 square feet (1,125.2 m^{2}). There were originally a total of 35 rooms inside, including 2 kitchens, 12 bedrooms, and 11 bathrooms. As built, the interior was Renaissance-inspired with elements of other styles, including Asian styles. Murals were installed at the same height as the cornices of many rooms. The interiors were adorned with elaborate carved woodwork, marble, and tilework, which came from places as disparate as Egypt, India, and Turkey. The interior has undergone numerous modifications over the years, including the subdivision of some rooms, although many of the original decorations remain intact. A rear stair connects all the stories.

Accessed from the entrance is a vestibule with mosaic tile and marble decoration with floral motifs; sources variously described the vestibule ceiling as being made of Rookwood or faience tiles. A second pair of doors lead from the vestibule further inside, where there is a foyer with marble paneling and marble ceilings; a salon leads left (north) of the foyer, and a reception room and smoking room lead right (south) of the foyer. The living room measures about 15 by 18 feet (4.6 by 5.5 m) across. The parlor has a fireplace with floral motifs, alongside painted wall panels that are ornately carved. The dining room retains an original fireplace, stained glass windows, wooden wainscoting reaching up to the level of the door lintels, and a coved ceiling. The smoking room has gold-leaf decorations and a ceiling fresco. There was also a drawing room with a coved ceiling.

There is a stair hall with a coffered ceiling made of oak, along with a grand oak stair. The library is one flight up from the ground floor and is illuminated by the large window on the north side. The library has wooden wall panels imported from India, along with a seat adjoining a window opening and a gold-tinged elliptical ceiling. The library was originally illuminated by lighting behind its cornice, as well as by lamps on the walls and on furniture. The upper stories have been substantially modified from their original design. As built, the front of the second story had the master bedroom suite with Circassian walnut woodwork, Skyros marble walls, and a frieze. The rear of the second story had white mahogany bedrooms. The stair between the second and third stories has additional stained glass windows. The third floor has a large room with several smaller rooms radiating from it, an unusual layout that Hans Smit, a later resident, called a "harem floor"; these rooms were clad in maple. Servants slept in the third floor's rear bedrooms.

Under the first floor is an English basement. A trapdoor leads from the basement to a tunnel that once extended west to the Hudson River, but this tunnel has since been closed up. The front of the basement was originally equipped with mechanical equipment such as power generators, pumps, and pneumatic cleaning equipment. The basement was also fitted with a small boiler. The mechanical equipment powered an elaborate system of lighting throughout the house, which included over 30,000 feet (9,100 m) of wiring and 11,000 feet (3,400 m) of conduits. The pneumatic cleaning system included outlets in every room, which were concealed behind bronze boxes matching the color of the original furniture.

== History ==
=== Schinasi use ===
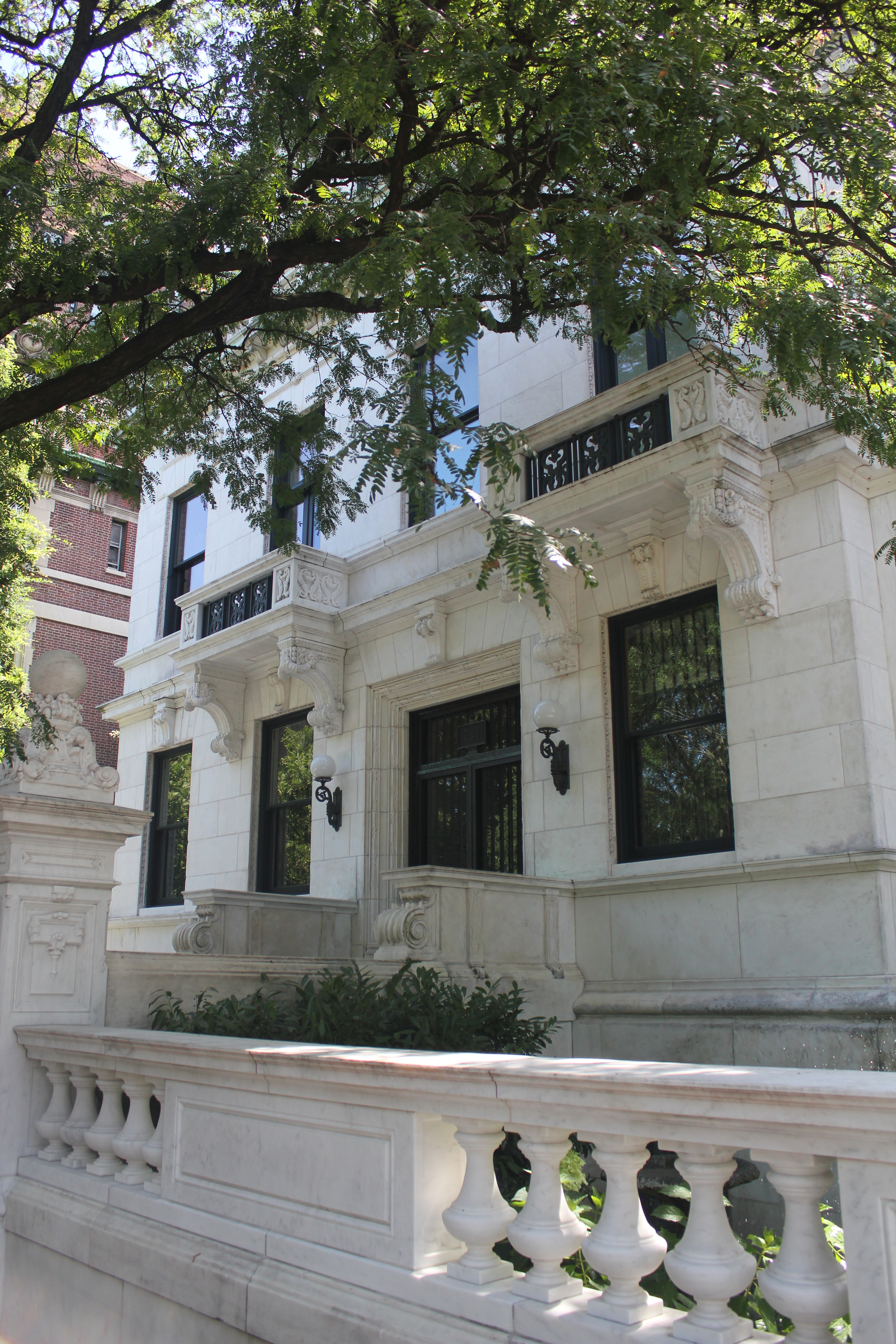
Main entrance

Morris Schinasi was an Ottoman Jewish immigrant who came to the United States in 1890. Having made his wealth in the cigar industry and married in 1903, he decided to build the mansion on Riverside Drive. At the time most mansions were being built along Park Avenue and Fifth Avenue, but there were predictions that the wealthy would build their extravagant homes along the quieter Riverside Drive. Schinasi selected William Tuthill as the architect for the mansion. Charles T. Wills was hired to build the house. When Wills was hired to build the house in early 1908, the construction cost was estimated at $180,000 (equivalent to $6,450,000 in 2025). Other contractors included glasswork contractor Tiffany Studios, marble supplier Vermont Marble Company, and fabric supplier William Baumgarten & Co.

The Schinasi House was completed in 1909, one year after work began. Schinasi lived at the mansion with his wife Laurette and their three daughters Victoria, Juliette, and Altina. According to census records, Schinasi also employed multiple live-in servants from multiple countries in Europe. Soon after the house was completed, Tuthill sued Schinasi to recover $5,655.65 in unpaid architectural design fees. In 1928 Schinasi died at the age of seventy-one.

=== Later use ===
Schinasi's heirs sold the house to Semple Realty Corporation in 1930 for $200,000 (equivalent to $3,855,000 in 2025). After passing out of Schinasi family ownership, the building was initially used as a school. Its first occupant was the Semple School for Girls, a women's finishing school. The Semple School was operated by Rosa Gunter Semple, who died there in 1956.

Columbia University was the next to purchase the building in 1960 and turned it into a daycare center. During the middle of that decade, high school students at St. Hilda's & St. Hugh's School attended classes at the Schinasi House while their new building was being constructed. Between 1968 and 1969, when Columbia owned the building, it hosted the Current Digest of the Soviet Press offices. The New York City Agency for Child Development began renting the building in 1971, making $10,000 in repairs over three years (equivalent to $65,000 in 2025). Columbia placed the building for sale in 1974 and received an offer for $300,000 (equivalent to $1,959,000 in 2025). To prevent the children's center from being evicted, the city government agreed to rent the building for another five years. On March 19, 1974, the Schinasi House was named as a New York City designated landmark. The New York City Landmarks Preservation Commission, in designating the house, described it as "a fine example of the neo-French Renaissance residential architecture" on the Upper West Side.

Columbia sold the mansion in 1979 to Columbia law professor Hans Smit and his wife for $325,000 (equivalent to $1,442,000 in 2025). The house was added to the National Register of Historic Places on April 23, 1980, and to the New York State Register of Historic Places on June 23 that year. Smit had completed an interior renovation of the building by 1997; in a New York Times interview that year, he called it "the best investment I ever made", even though he had not cleaned the exterior. Smit attempted to sell the house in 2006, with an initial asking price of either $30 million or $31 million. (Note: One source gives a figure of $25 million, but this is impossible given that the price was later reduced to $29 million.) At the time, the building needed several millions of dollars in additional repairs, and the site, located north of 96th Street, was not as desirable as the neighborhoods further south. Smit later lowered his price to $29 million. The house remained unsold for many years, and it was relisted for sale in late 2011. Mark Schwartz, a vice chairman at the Goldman Sachs investment bank, bought the Schinasi House in 2013, paying $14 million. By then, it was one of the last freestanding single-family houses in Manhattan that was still being used as a residence.

== Reception ==
When the Schinasi House was built, Architects' and Builders' Magazine said the house's "Oriental idea of seclusiveness" was exemplified in the small living room, and that the building had a sense of "dignity and yet without severity or coldness", but regarded the mansion as excessively ornate and attributed it to the owner's taste "overwhelm[ing] the good taste of the designer". "Exquisite from any side" was the Real Estate Record and Guide's assessment of the building. Later on, the architecture critic Robert A. M. Stern wrote that the building was "unsurpassed in refinement in [Manhattan's] West End". Financial Times writer Dalia Fahmy, in 2006, called it a "rarity among Manhattan's tightly packed townhouses", saying it "dripped with opulence a century ago" even in its dilapidated state. Stephanie Azzarone, in a book about Riverside Drive's history, characterized the building in 2022 as the "residential jewel in the crown of Riverside Drive".

== See also ==
- National Register of Historic Places listings in Manhattan from 59th to 110th Streets
- List of New York City Designated Landmarks in Manhattan from 59th to 110th Streets
