= USCGC Madrona =

USCGC Madrona (WAGL/WLB-302)

History

United States
- Builder: Zenith Dredge Company
- Cost: $949,144
- Commissioned: 30 May 1943
- Decommissioned: 12 April 2002
- Refit: 1984
- Identification: Callsign: NRPT
- Fate: Sold 2002

General characteristics
- Class & type: Cactus
- Displacement: 1,025 long tons (1,041 t)
- Length: 180 ft (55 m)
- Beam: 37 ft (11 m)
- Draft: 12 ft (3.7 m) max (1945); 14 ft 7 in (4.45 m) (1966)
- Propulsion: First refit: 1 electric motor connected to 2 Westinghouse generators driven by 2 Cooper-Bessemer type GND-8, 4 cycle diesels. 1 screw.; Second refit: 2 × General Motors EMD 645 V8 diesel engines
- Speed: 13 kn (24 km/h; 15 mph)
- Range: 8,000 nmi (15,000 km; 9,200 mi) at 13 kn (24 km/h; 15 mph)
- Complement: 6 officers, 74 men (1945); 4 officers, 2 warrants, 47 men (1966); 48 (1971)
- Sensors & processing systems: Radar: Bk (1943); SL-1 (1945) Sonar: WEA-2 (1945)
- Armament: 1941: 1 × 3 in (76 mm)/50 (single); 2 × 20 mm Oerlikon/80 (single); 2 × depth charge tracks; 2 × Mousetraps; 4 × Y-guns; 1966: M2 Browning machine guns; M60 machine guns and small arms

USCGC Madrona (WAGL/WLB-302) was a U.S. Coast Guard 180 foot seagoing buoy tender. Madrona was built by the Zenith Dredge Company of Duluth, Minnesota at a cost of $949,144.

== History ==
Madrona was commissioned on 30 May 1943. Upon commissioning, the cutter was assigned the homeport of Miami, Florida. In addition to performing convoy duty during World War II, Madrona was actively involved in the installation of numerous new aids to navigation throughout the Southeastern United States and the Caribbean Sea. In September 1947, Madrona's homeport was changed to Portsmouth, Virginia, where she was responsible for maintenance and inspection of aids to navigation in the Chesapeake Bay. On 27 April 1949, the cutter searched for a reported mine near the Chesapeake Lightship. From 4–6 November 1950, Madrona towed the disabled MV Atlantic Explorer. On 14 May 1951, Madrona assisted following a collision between MV Thomas Tracey and a naval vessel. On 4 October 1951, she assisted MV Marose, which had grounded near Cape Henry, Virginia. On 26 July 1957, Madrona's crew assisted in fighting a fire on MV Havmoy in the Lynnhaven Roads. In February 1958, Madrona was called upon to break ice in the Chesapeake Bay. In April 1959, the cutter assisted MV Terra Nova in the lower Chesapeake Bay. In September 1960, Madrona provided assistance in the Portsmouth area following Hurricane Donna. On 4 February 1963, she assisted following the collision between the MV Skaustrand and the tanker P.W. Thirtle in Baltimore Harbor. On 27–28 February 1967, the crew helped fight a fire on MV Caldas 50 miles east of Chincoteague, Virginia. On 24 May 1980, Madrona escorted the disabled tanker Esso Portland to Hampton Roads. In January 1982, she broke ice in order to permit salvage barges to move to the scene of the Air Florida crash site on the Potomac River in Washington, DC. In February 1983 she located the SS Marine Electric which sank in a storm that month off the coast of Virginia and placed a buoy to mark the wreck's location and warn mariners of the hazard it posed.

In April 1984, Madrona entered the U.S. Coast Guard Shipyard in Curtis Bay, Maryland, to undergo a major renovation under the Coast Guard's Service Life Extension Program, commonly referred to as SLEP. This $15 million overhaul, encompassing the complete rebuilding of the interior of the vessel, greatly improved living conditions and replaced the aging propulsion plant. In September 1989, Madrona was returned to service, this time to her new home port of Charleston, South Carolina, where she remained until her decommissioning. While stationed in South Carolina, Madrona was responsible for the inspection and maintenance of 334 buoys along the South Carolina and Georgia coastlines, as well as Guantánamo Bay Cuba, the eastern part of Puerto Rico, and the U.S. Virgin Islands. In 2000, Madrona set the mooring buoys that helped raise the Confederate Submarine Hunley in Charleston Harbor.

Madrona was decommissioned after almost 59 years of active service in a ceremony held at Coast Guard Base Charleston on 12 April 2002. Following her decommissioning, the cutter was sold to the Navy of El Salvador. As of 30 September 2007, this ship has been reported out of service. It now rests at the bottom of the sea, 7 kilometres (4.3 mi) offshore at Los Cobanos Beach in El Salvador.

Her call sign (NRPT) was jokingly referred to by her crew as being short for "Not Ready for Prime Time". (Personal crewmember knowledge for trivia: served aboard her from 1982-1984.)
