= Morris Schinasi =

Turkish-Jewish businessman

- Moris Şinasi
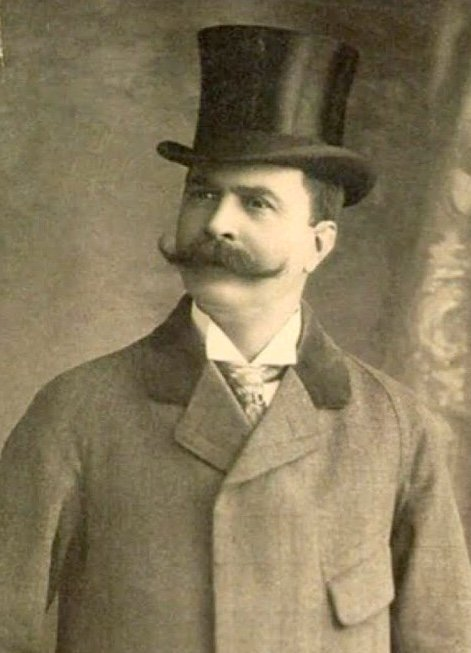
- Born: Musa Eskenazi; April 27, 1855; Manisa, Ottoman Empire
- Died: September 10, 1928 (aged 73); New York City, U.S.
- Occupation: Businessman
- Spouse: Laurette Schinasi (m. 1903)
- Children: 3 daughters including Altina (1907–99)
- Awards: Order of the Medjidie of the Ottoman Empire

Morris Schinasi (Turkish: Moris Şinasi; born Musa Eskenazi; April 27, 1855 – September 10, 1928) was an Ottoman-born wealthy American businessman in the tobacco industry.

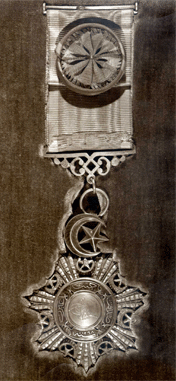
Medjidie Medal of the Ottoman Empire bestowed to Morris Schinasi

He was born in 1855 in Manisa, Ottoman Empire to relatively poor Sephardic Jew parents. At the age of nine, he contracted diphtheria. He was treated by a Muslim physician named Şinasi (Shinasi or Schinasi in European languages) and regained his health. His parents named him henceforth Moris Şinasi as a gesture of gratitude. He had two brothers Solomon (also known as Shlomo) and Yaakov, and a sister, Sultana.

He was forced to leave the school and worked in a Jewish cemetery as a guard. At the age of fifteen, he left Turkey for Alexandria, Egypt, where he lived until he was nearly thirty. It was then that Garaffolo, a successful Greek tobacco merchant, who informally adopted Schinasi in Alexandria, determined that Schinasi should seek his fortune in America. In 1890, he immigrated to the United States.

== Career ==
In 1893, Morris Schinasi exhibited the cigarette made with his patented cigarette-rolling machine at the 1893 Chicago World's Fair. Schinasi then returned to New York City to found Schinasi Brothers with his brother, Solomon, who had also came to the United States. Together, the Schinasis produced ready-made cigarettes under the brand name "Natural" at their factory on 120th Street and Broadway using imported Turkish tobacco rather than Virginia-grown leaves. They became highly successful. In solidarity with their roots, the brothers invited about 200 Turkish Jews from their homeland to work in the factory. By 1907, both brothers became millionaires.

In 1916, the brothers sold the cigarette factory, worth $2 million, and all commercial rights for the business, to the American Tobacco Company for $3.5 million, and retired from active business life. Morris Schinasi died on September 10, 1928, at the age of 74. A large portion of his wealth, well over $5 million, was designated to charity. A one-million dollar fund was entrusted to the Chemical Bank and Trust Company of New York for founding a hospital in Manisa, the town of his birth.

His success was acknowledged by Abdul Hamid II, the Sultan of the Ottoman Empire at the time, who gave him the Medjidie Medal of fourth degree "for his excellent efforts in promoting this industry, which won for him His Majesty's commendation." The presentation took place in July 1908.

At a press conference held in Athens, Greece, he passed a note to a person sitting next to him asking him to read it because of his illiteracy. He was then asked "You became so wealthy as an illiterate. What would you have become if you were literate?". He replied, "A good cemetery guard." referring to his job at age fifteen when he was fired because he could not take a family to their relative's grave. This might have inspired the short story "The Verger" in the book "Trio" by W. Somerset Maugham.

== Family ==
During a business trip to Salonica, then in the Ottoman Empire, he met his future wife, Laurette Schinasi née Ben Rubi, the granddaughter of his business associate Joseph Ben Rubi. He married the 16-year-old girl in 1903. The couple had three daughters, Victoria, Juliette, and Altina.

His daughter Altina Schinasi (1907–1999) was an American sculptor, filmmaker, entrepreneur, window dresser, designer, and inventor, best known for designing the Harlequin eyeglass frame.

== Legacy ==
Upon Morris Schinasi's death, his widow Laurette Schinasi traveled in April 1930 to Manisa, Turkey to establish Moris Sinasi Çocuk Hastahanesi, or Moris Sinasi Children's Hospital in the city of her late husband's birth. The construction of the institution was financed by 80% of the $1 million inheritance. The Turkish government exempted the customs duty from all imported construction materials and hospital equipment by a special act. With the remaining sum, bonds were acquired, of which interests are regularly transferred to the hospital needed for health-care costs. Opened on August 15, 1933, the hospital is still operational.

An international association for children's health based in Turkey, "Morris Şinasi Milletlerarası Çocuk Sağlığı Derneği", bears his name.

His family mansion built in 1907 at West 107th Street & 351 Riverside in Manhattan, New York City and called the Schinasi House today, is designated as a New York City Landmark and is listed in the National Register of Historic Places. Many of the rooms in the marble building, architecturally inspired by the French Renaissance, were decorated in Turkish style.
