= Madroño =

Madroño may refer to:

== Places ==
- El Madroño, Spanish municipality of Seville
- Navas del Madroño, Spanish municipality of Cáceres, Extremadura

== Botany ==
- Garcinia madruno, a tropical species of fruit tree in the family Clusiaceae
- Madroño, common name of some species in the genus Arbutus, family Ericaceae
- Madroño (journal), scientific journal of the California Botanical Society
