= George Grosz' Interregnum =

- Produced by: Altina Carey; Charles Carey
- Narrated by: Lotte Lenya
- Cinematography: Terry Sanders
- Distributed by: Contemporary Films
- Release date: 1960
- Running time: 29 minutes
- Country: United States
- Language: English

George Grosz' Interregnum is a 29-minute-long documentary film about the artist George Grosz produced by Altina Carey and Charles Carey, and narrated by Lotte Lenya. It was nominated for an Academy Award for Best Documentary Short. The original music was by Paul Glass, and the cinematography by Terry Sanders. The film was released on video as "Germany Between The Wars". The Academy Film Archive preserved Interregnum in 2013.

== See also ==
- List of American films of 1960
