= Madrone (band) =

American alternative rock band

Madrone is an American alternative rock band based in Roanoke, Virginia, formed on frontman and guitarist John "JD" Sutphin's birthday in February 2005. After several member changes, the line-up solidified as a power-trio featuring Joey Coleman on drums in 2005 and Blaine Davis on bass guitar and live back-up vocals in 2007. The group broke through the Billboard Mainstream Top 200 in summer 2010 with their single "Daybreak", written about a close friend who died from a heroin overdose. The song entered the chart at #82 and climbed for 8 weeks; peaking at #50. Madrone has been inactive since 2015 when the lead vocalist formed The Low Low Chariot. According to Madrone Facebook, they are on hiatus. As of June 2023, the band is still on hiatus while J.D. continues to work on new music with The Low Low Chariot.

== Members ==
=== Current ===
John "J.D." Sutphin - Lead Vocals, Electric Guitar, Acoustic Guitar (Currently in Low Low Chariot) - 2005 - 2015
Joey Coleman - Drums and Percussion - 2005 - 2015
Blaine Davis - Bass Guitar, Back-up Vocals (live) - 2005 - 2015 Matt McGhee - Guitar (left for family) - 2005 - 2015

== Discography ==
=== Albums ===
- In Time (2008) Produced by Jake Dempsey at Red Room Studios in Roanoke, Virginia
- Karma Catastrophe (2011) Produced by Scott Spelbring at Dragonfly East Studios in Haymarket, Virginia and Cue Recording Studio in Falls Church, Virginia
- A Light In The Sky (2014)

=== Extended plays ===
Cause and Compromise (2007) Produced by Scott Spelbring at Dragonfly East Studios in Haymarket, Virginia
The Glass Man EP (2009) Single produced by Jake Dempsey at Red Room Studios in Roanoke, Virginia; Acoustic renditions produced by Dave McDonald at Flat 5 Studios in Salem, Virginia

=== Singles, Compilations, B-Sides, and Live Albums ===
Daybreak (2010) (Single) Produced by Scott Spelbring at Dragonfly East Studios in Haymarket, Virginia

- Peaked at #50 on the Billboard Mainstream Top 200 in August 2010.

5-Year anniversary compilation (2010) Featuring songs from In Time, Cause and Compromise (Matthew Tinsley on Bass Guitar), and The Glass Man EP
