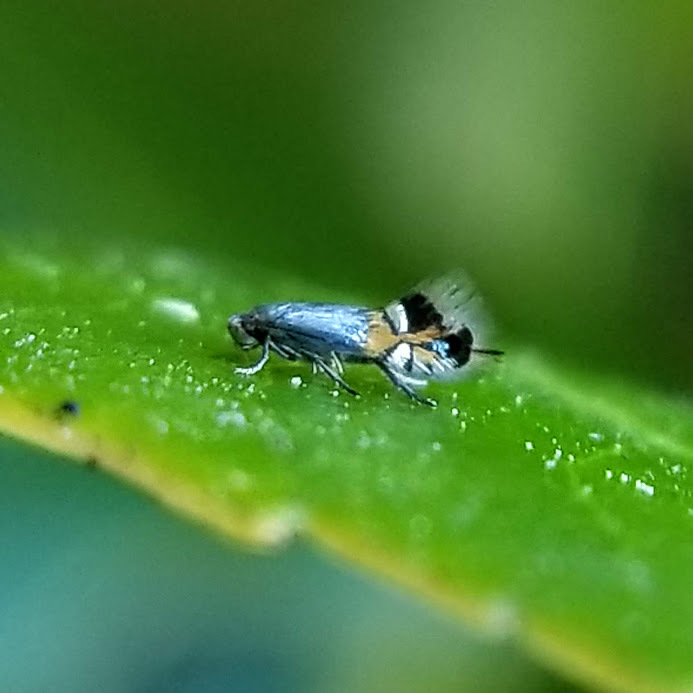

Scientific classification
- Kingdom: Animalia
- Phylum: Arthropoda
- Clade: Pancrustacea
- Class: Insecta
- Order: Lepidoptera
- Family: Heliozelidae
- Genus: Coptodisca
- Species: C. arbutiella

Binomial name
- Coptodisca arbutiella Busck, 1904

= Coptodisca arbutiella =

Madrone shield bearer

Species of moth

Coptodisca arbutiella, the madrone shield bearer, is a moth of the family Heliozelidae. It was described by August Busck in 1904. It is found in western North America from California to British Columbia.

The larvae feed on Arbutus species. They mine the leaves of their host plant. The mine is blotch-like.
