= Madrona School =

Madrona School for K-8 Gifted Education (Vancouver, BC)
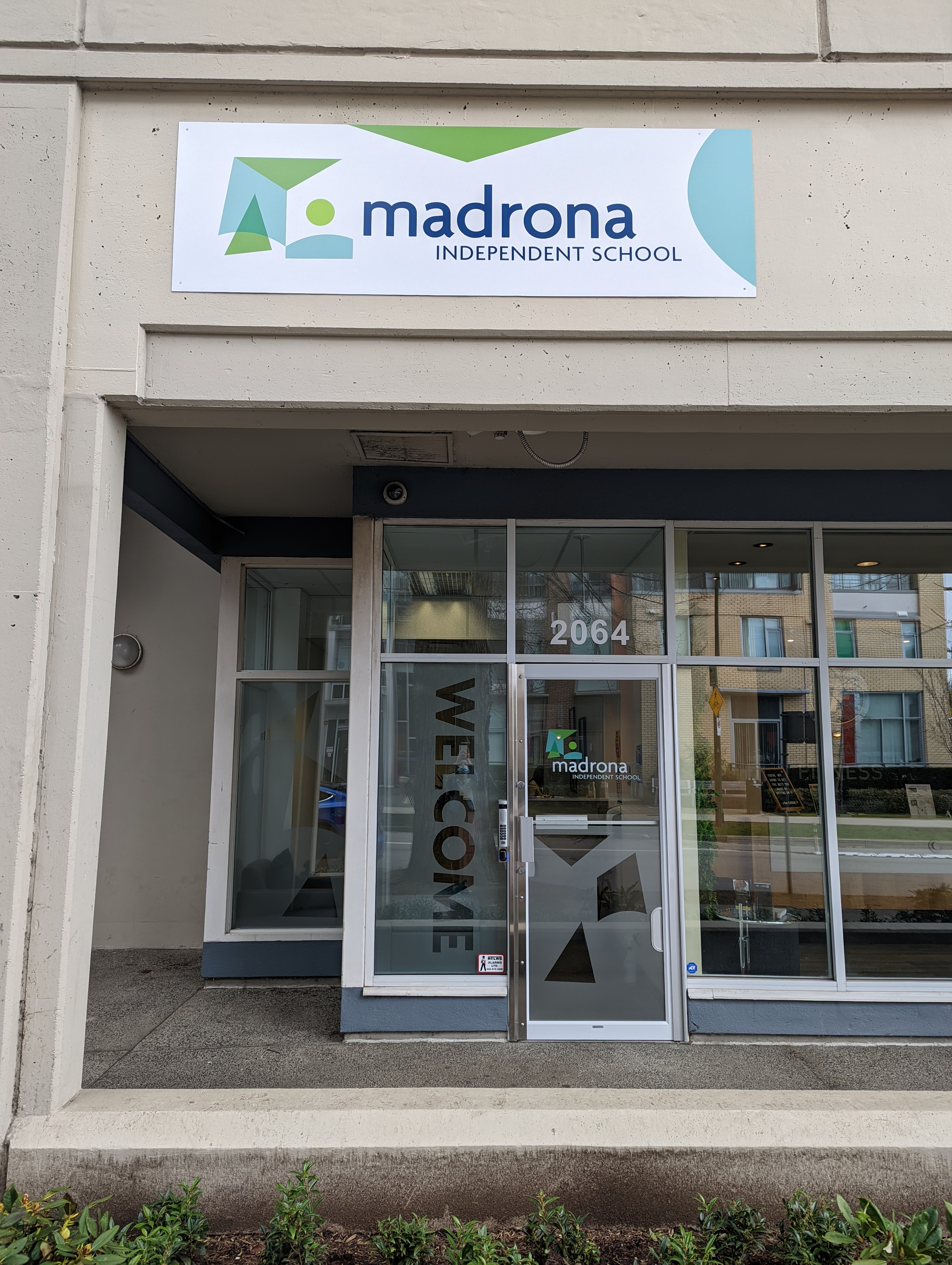

Location
- 2064 West 10th Avenue; Vancouver, British Columbia, V6J 2B3; Canada; 49°15′45″N 123°9′6″W

Information
- Grades: K-8
- Language: English
- Website: www.madronaschool.com

Madrona School Society is a not-for-profit independent school located in Vancouver, British Columbia, with a focus on gifted education. Subjects are taught in small groups based on students' ability levels. On average, the student-teacher ratio is between 6:1 and 14:1. Currently, the school offers Kindergarten through Grade 8.

== History ==
Madrona was established in 1993 in the Arbutus Walk area of Vancouver's Kitsilano neighbourhood. In 2002, it moved to the Fairview neighbourhood. It moved a second time in 2008, back to Arbutus Walk. In September 2013, Madrona opened its Primary Annex (Kindergarten to Grade 3) at 2678 West Broadway, a location shared with Pear Tree Education. Madrona left 2678 West Broadway in June 2016. It divided its students between two campuses, Madrona West, located at 2040/2050 West 10th (Kindergarten to Grade 5), and Madrona Downtown, located at 530 Hornby Street (Grades 6 to 10). Madrona Downtown later closed, and Madrona West has been expanded into neighboring 2070 West 10th.

== Governance ==
The Madrona School Society Board of Directors has the authority and responsibility to supervise the management of the affairs of the Society to ensure its continued well-being. The Board oversees the strategy, the budget and financial controls, and sets the overarching policies for the operation and control of the school.

== Madrona West Campus ==
The Madrona West campus is located in Kitsilano, at 2064 West 10th Avenue. This campus houses Kindergarten to Grade 9 (Formerly K-5 before Downtown Campus closed.). A recent 2019 renovation included connecting 2040 and 2050, interior work, and a brand new Administration building, in 2070 (purchased in renovation).

== Madrona Downtown Campus ==
Madrona's previous sister campus location was downtown, at 530 Hornby Street. The Madrona Downtown campus housed Grades 6 to 10. It was sold around 2016, but there are no online records.

== Curriculum ==
Madrona is a Group 2 independent school. It delivers the BC curriculum focusing on the new curriculum in particular. "Essential learning, literacy and numeracy foundations, and core competencies are the base of [the] new curriculum. All three contribute to deeper learning." In addition to the regular curriculum, students study current events, art, music, and drama, and take part in an interdisciplinary technology program covering subjects such as digital art and photography, computer programming, textiles, outdoor education, robotics, and web application development.

== Sports ==
Madrona is yet to have a BC School Sports certified team, However they are eligible (for some sports) An issue is the lack of a gym, which eliminates the possibility for many sports such as basketball or volleyball. Although there is no sports team they have participated in several Track & Field contests in recent years, and have had several talented young athletes learn at Madrona. Madrona students get Physical Education class twice weekly in which they often go to Connaught Park, where they frequently play sports such as US Football and Soccer, Students also play there during there lunch break.

== Notable people ==
- Chris Mclaughlin – CEBL Basketball Player, Fraser Valley Bandits
- Shelley Lammie – Principal (retired), Madrona School
- Jason Camp – Principal, Madrona School
