= Rene Ben Sussan =

René Ben Sussan
- Born: 1895; Thessaloniki, Greece
- Died: 1988 (aged 92–93); Paris, France
- Other names: René Ben-Sussan, René Bensussan
- Occupation: Artist
- Years active: c 1920 - c 1975

René Ben Sussan (1895-1988) was a French painter, illustrator, printmaker and woodblock artist, active from the 1920s through the 1960s. He is best known for his numerous book illustrations, and for his famous painting "Bal à Porquerolles".

== Career ==
Little is known about Ben Sussan's early life, other than that he was born in Greece, spent the World War I years in Spain and Marseille, and then settled in Paris, becoming a French citizen in 1926.

At the beginning of his career, he focused on landscapes and portraits. He quickly made a name for himself and exhibited at the Salon d'Automne in 1921 and the Salon des Tuileries in 1924. He became good friends with the sculptor Alexander Calder, who inspired him to move into more abstract work.

Ben Sussan was also a successful illustrator. Between 1925 and 1972, he illustrated as many has 50 editions of classic literature, often for the Limited Editions Club and the Heritage Press.

René Ben Sussan died in Paris in 1988 and is buried in the Père Lachaise Cemetery.

== Selected illustrations ==
The Pilgrim on the Earth, by Julien Green. The Blackamore Press 1929. 12 wood engravings in color.

Carmen by Prosper Mérimée. Éditions Gallimard 1930.

The School for Scandal by Richard Brinsley Sheridan, Limited Editions Club 1934. Illustrated with hand-colored copper etchings.

The Merchant of Venice by William Shakespeare, Limited Editions Club, 1939

The Hortensia Sisters by Henri Duvernois. Fayard 1941.

Old Goriot by Honoré de Balzac, Limited Editions Club, 1948.

Volpone, or The Fox, by Ben Jonson. Limited Editions Club, 1952

The Rivals and The School for Scandal by Richard Brinsley Sheridan, Limited Edition Clubs 1953. Etchings hand-colored. 1st thus 4 to gold stamped full yellow buckram, 12 copper plate hand-colored etchings.

Sheridan's Plays by Richard Brinsley Sheridan, Heritage Press, 1956

The Cid, translated by Robert Southey. Limited Editions Club 1958

Eugénie Grandet by Honoré de Balzac, translated from the French by Ellen Marriage with an introduction by Richard Aldington, Heritage Press 1960

The Memoirs of Jacques Casanova de Seingalt, translated by Arthur Machen. Limited Editions Club 1972
