= Şinasi Bozatlı =

Turkish artist

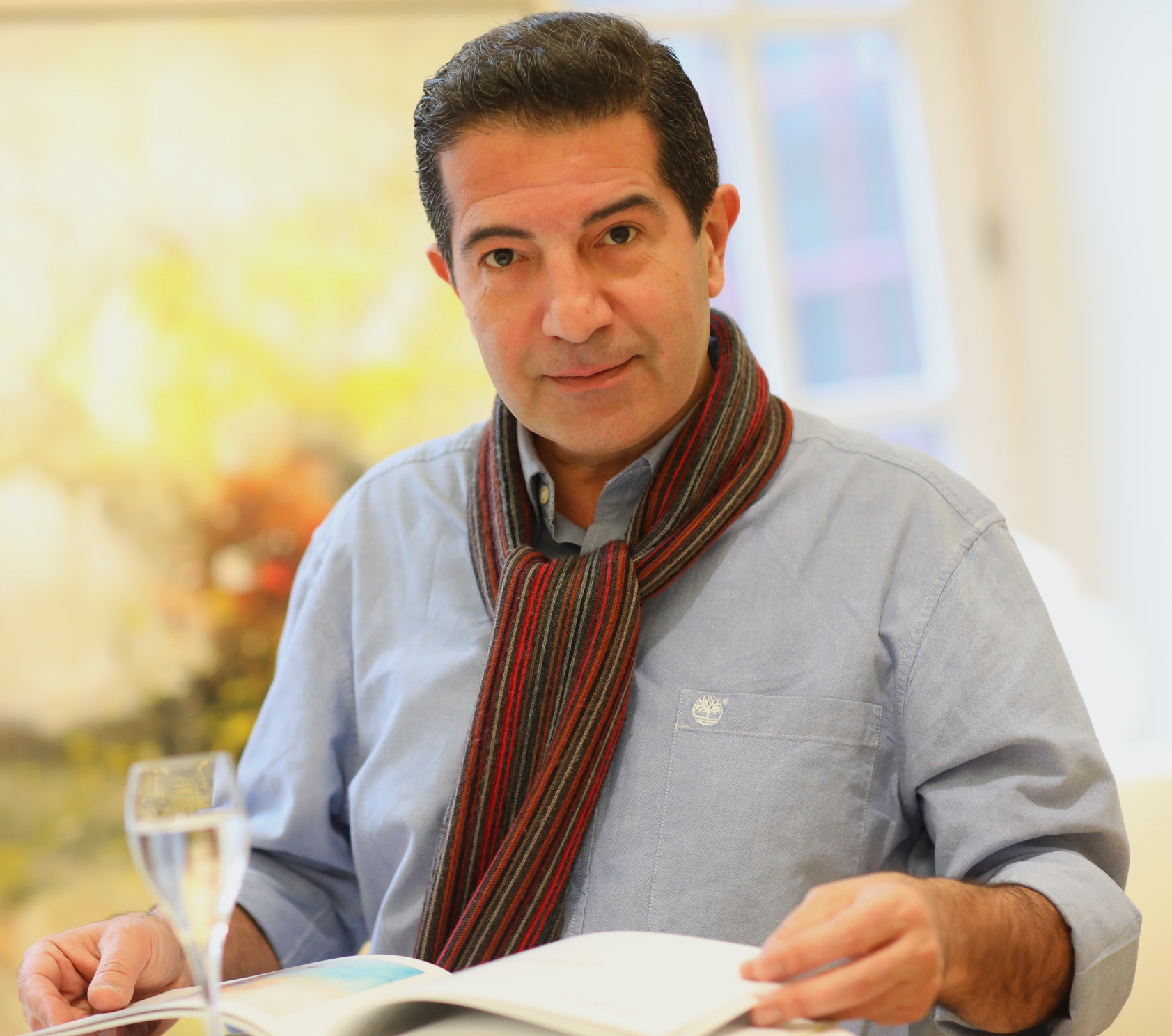
Sinasi Bozatli at an exhibition in 2017

Sinasi Bozatli (born 1962) born in Ankara painter, sculptor and graphic artist.

He is a member of IG Bildende Kunst and IAA / UNESCO. Studied painting and sculpture on Gazi University in Ankara (1984) and painting and graphics at the University of Applied Arts Vienna. He lives and works in Vienna since 1987. He owns a studio in Long Island since 1998, and partly works in the US.

== Solo exhibitions (selection) ==
- Atlanta – USA, Gallery Beverly K. Libby
- Cape Town – South Africa, Gallery Seeff Trust
- New York - USA Gallery Bixler
- Washington, D.C. USA, Austrian Cultural Forum
- Istanbul Sur Gallery- 8. International Artfair Istanbul, Gallery Ares, Gallery MEB - 6. International Artfair Istanbul, Sabanci Art Center, 1000 Jahre Österreich", Vakko Gallery
- Ankara – Turkey MI-GE Gallery, Zon Gallery, Artium Gallery, Halk Sanat Galerisi, Galerie Sanat-Yapim
- Vienna : Galerie Sur, AT&P, Palais Eschenbach, Alte Schmiede – Kunstverein Vienna, Galerie G&N, ICC-Hofburg, Galerie Ziwna at Palais Harrach, Galerie Mitte
- Perchtoldsdorf Lions Club Vienna-Laudon
- Eisenstadt Galerie 1990
- Wr. Neustadt Galerie Impact; Gumpoldskirchen Bergerhaus
- Eskisehir - Turkey University of Anatolia "1000 Jahre Österreich"
- Balikesir – Turkey Museum of Fine Arts "1000 Jahre Österreich"
- Bursa - Turkey Tayyare Cultural Center "1000 Jahre Österreich"
- 2004 National Museum Cotroceni Bucharest, Romania "Good Morning Balkan"
- 2004 St. Anna Kapelle Vienna, Austria, "Colours of Life"
- 2004 EPD Gallery Prague City Center Prague, Czech Republic - November 2004
- 2005 Galerie Ziwna at Palais Harrach 1010 Vienna
- 2009 Studio opening 1040 Vienna

== Group exhibitions ==
- Torremolinos - Spain "Un dialogo Espanol-Austriaco" - Centro Cultural Pablo Ruiz Picasso
- Cairo, Egypt Opera; Seoul, Corea "Prefestival" - Kepco Plaza Gallery
- Seoul, Corea 2002 Flag Art Festival - Friedenspark
- Atlanta - Georgia, USA Gallery Beverly K. Libby
- New York - USA Gallery Bixler
- Stroudsburg - Pennsylvania, USA Gallery Bixler
- Cape Town – South Africa Gallery Seef Trust
- Istanbul - Turkey Gallery Baraz
- Sofia, Bulgaria "Beyond Boundaries - Sur de Vienne" National Gallery for Foreign Arts
- Vienna - Austria West - Östlicher Diwan – Galerie MUSA
- Festival der Kulturen - Hallamasch Vienna – Galerie Sur
- Galerie Sur in Haus Wittgenstein
- Mobiles Caritas Hospiz - Palais Dorotheum
- Achammer Tritthart & Partner
- Kunst im Eisenhof
- Galerie Station 3
- Wasserturm
- Galerie Ziwna
- Eisenstadt Galerie 1990
- Wr. Neustadt Galerie Impact
- Salzburg 2002 - 2003 International Artfair Salzburg

== Public purchase ==
- Museum of Modern Art, Ankara;
- Federal Chancellery of the Republic of Austria;
- City of Vienna;
- Lower Austria Government;
- Republic of Turkey Ministry of Culture
