= BC Healthy Living Alliance =

Canadian provincial advocacy group

- BC Healthy Living Alliance logo
- Abbreviation: BCHLA
- Formation: 2003
- Headquarters: Vancouver, British Columbia, Canada
- Region served: British Columbia
- Official language: English
- Website: BC Healthy Living Alliance Official Website

The BC Healthy Living Alliance (BCHLA), formed in 2003, is the largest coalition of health leaders in British Columbia's history. As a non-partisan advocacy group, the BCHLA works with government and holds them accountable to promote wellness and prevent chronic disease.

In 2006, after publishing The Winning Legacy advocacy paper, the Government of BC provided BCHLA with a $25 million grant to implement initiatives across the province that would support the achievement of the targets outlined in the paper. The initiatives, which focus on healthy eating, physical activity, tobacco reduction, and community capacity building are now underway in over 105 communities across British Columbia. As they continue to early 2010, BCHLA is continually working closely with ActNow BC and the Ministry of Healthy Living and Sport along with many other community partners.

The Alliance continues its policy work and has developed a discussion paper, Healthy Futures for BC Families, on the social issues that can impede or enhance the healthy of a society. These issues include access to: affordable housing, early childhood development and care, income and food security, and supportive environments.

== Background ==
The Alliance was formed in February 2003 with a mission to lead collaborative actions to promote physical activity, healthy eating, and living smoke-free in order to improve the overall health of British Columbians.

In March 2006, the Alliance received "a one-time grant of $25.2 million to pursue recommendations outlined in their report, "The Winning Legacy - A plan for improving the health of British Columbians by 2010." Health Minister George Abbott had said, "We are supporting programs that promote healthy living and prevent illness in our society. Research tells us that four risk factors are the major causes of our most common chronic diseases. Lifestyle choices about nutrition, exercise, tobacco use and healthy choices during pregnancy can make a real difference in our own health, and in the sustainability of the entire health-care system."

While the Alliance recognizes there is a wide range of chronic diseases, their primary focus is on the common risk factors and underlying determinants that contribute significantly to cancer, cardiovascular disease, chronic respiratory disease, and diabetes.

=== Goals ===
To reduce chronic disease in B.C., the Alliance has developed three specific goals:

- Advocate for and support health promoting policies, environments, programs, and services.
- Enhance collaboration among government, non-government and private sector organization.
- Increase capacity of communities to create and sustain health promoting policies, environment, programs, and services.

=== Members ===
The BCHLA Logo Tree of member organizations

Currently, the BC Healthy Living Alliance comprises nine member organizations. The first group of major non-governmental organizations that are involved in the prevention of chronic diseases include: The BC Lung Association, Canadian Diabetes Association Pacific, Heart & Stroke Foundation of BC and Yukon, and the Canadian Cancer Society, BC and Yukon Division.

The second group of members is organizations with direct links to local governments and communities. These members are the Union of BC Municipalities and BC Recreation and Parks Association.

Thirdly, BCHLA includes members of key health and wellness professionals. Dietitians of Canada BC Region, BC Pediatric Society, and the Public Health Association of BC are all members of the Alliance.

In addition, the BCHLA has advisory representation from government related bodies including: BC Health Authorities, 2010 Legacies Now, Public Health Agency of Canada, Ministry of Healthy Living and Sport, and ActNow BC.

== Advocacy ==
The BC Healthy Living Alliance "advocates for and supports health-promoting policies, environments, programs and services so that British Columbians have opportunities to be healthy." In particular, the BCHLA have written two evidence-based papers.

=== The Winning Legacy ===
The B.C. Risk Factor Intervention Plan, which the BCHLA calls The Winning Legacy, was initially presented to Premier Gordon Campbell and the BC Government on March 3, 2005. It is a "plan for improving the health of British Columbians by 2010 by simultaneous improvements in four risk factors of tobacco use, unhealthy weights, unhealthy eating, and physical inactivity."

The Winning Legacy explains that much of the chronic disease burden in the province is preventable by addressing these factors. BCHLA estimated that "these risk factors cost the B.C. economy approximately $3.8 billion annually". Caring for British Columbians with acute and chronic health conditions is using up an increasing proportion of government expenditures. This position paper presents 27 recommendations that addressed the aforementioned lifestyle risk factors related to chronic disease. In particular, these recommendations were summarized and divided into the following categories: Regulatory and Economic Interventions, Community-Based Interventions, School-Based Interventions, Workplace-Based Interventions, Clinical Interventions and Management, Specific Populations, and Surveillance, Evaluations, and other Administrative Costs. The Winning Legacy was estimated to cost $1.1 billion over a period of 6 years, which equals $41 per year for each British Columbian.

==== Discussions ====
A series of policy discussion forums were held across the province to discuss the social issues affecting health. The first forum was held on October 2, 2008 in Vancouver, British Columbia. The following three regional forums in the Interior, North, and Vancouver Island were held early 2009. The Interior Region discussion took place on February 13, 2009 in Williams Lake, with videoconferencing sites in Cranbrook, Kamloops, Kelowna, and Trail. Prince George was the main location for the March 12 North forum, which also hosted videoconferencing to Burns Lake, Dawson Creek, Fort St. John, Smithers, Terrace, Prince Rupert, and Queen Charlotte City. The last Healthy Futures for BC Families policy discussion was on March 25, 2009 in the city of Nanaimo on Vancouver Island.

The forums were intended to gain local perspectives from "health, government, academia, business, and Aboriginal communities" regarding the social issues affecting health and to seek solutions to improve these social conditions. Mary Collins, the Director of the BC Healthy Living Alliance Secretariat, said "research indicates access to income, employment, affordable housing, healthy food, education and early childhood development supports have a greater influence on the physical and mental healthy and life expectancy of British Columbians than genetics or any other single factor." In June 2008, Canada's chief public health officer, Dr. David Butler-Jones, stated in a report to Parliament that combating poverty, especially amongst the youth, is key to improving Canadians' physical and mental health.

After gathering information from the different regions across the province, the Alliance will produce their final report in the following months. The final report will be presented to the provincial and federal government, health authorities, and other community leaders.
