= Charles James Carey =

Royal Navy officer (1838–1891)

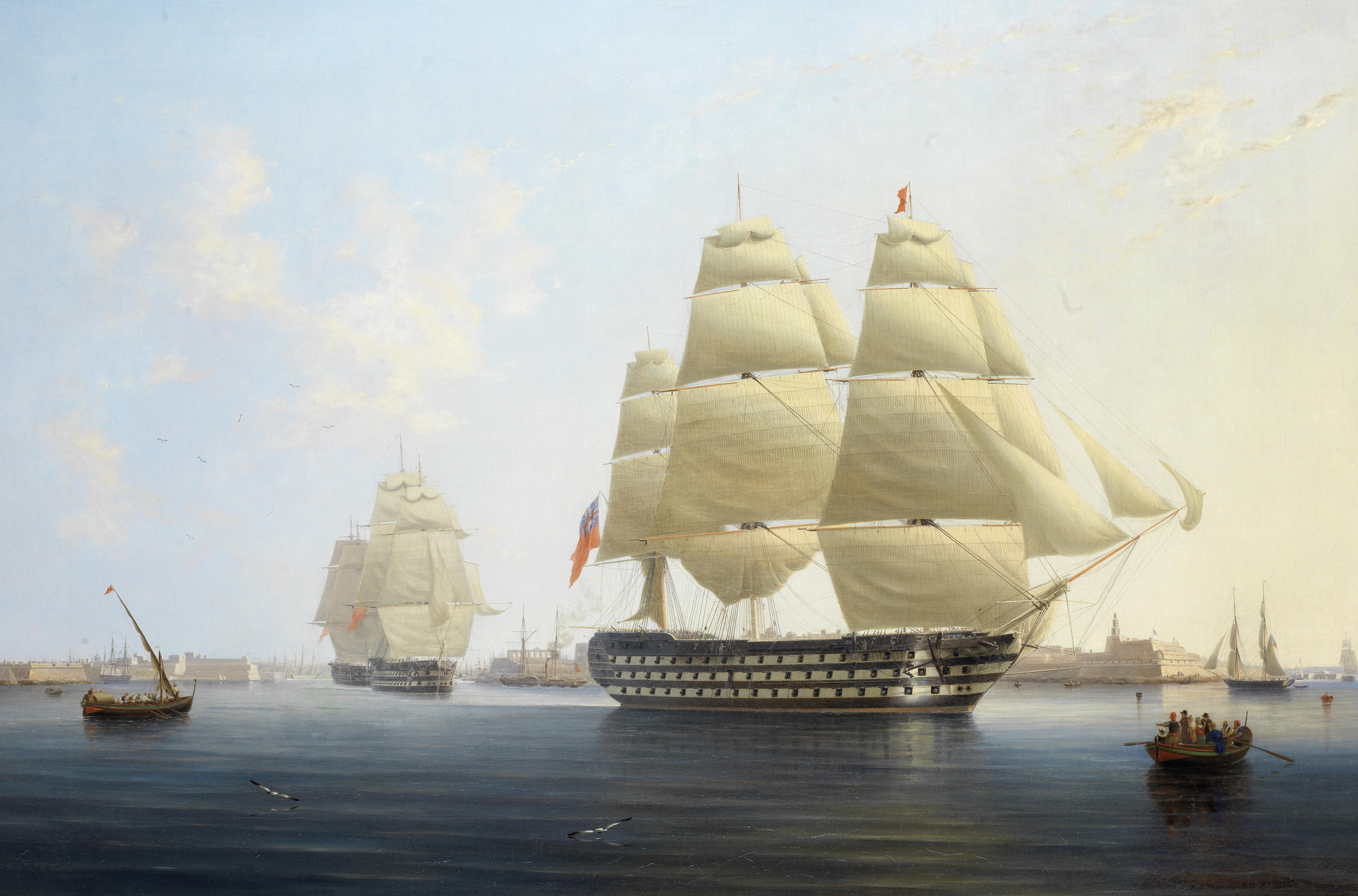
HMS Queen, flagship of Vice Admiral Sir Edward Rich Owen, commander-in-chief of the Mediterranean fleet, leaving Malta (Robert Strickland Thomas, 1842)

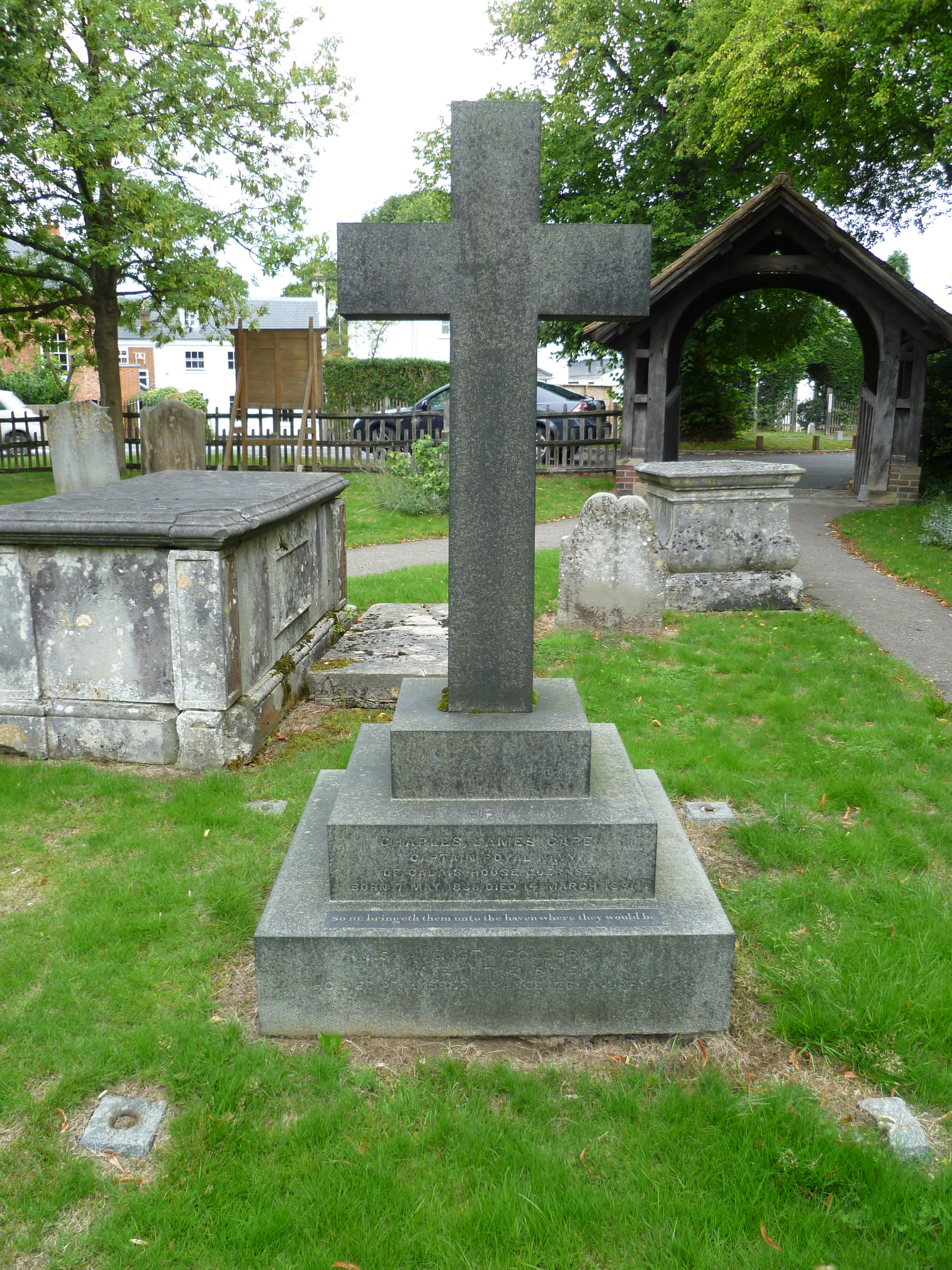
Charles Carey's grave at St Andrew's church, Totteridge

Charles James Carey (7 May 1838 – 14 March 1891) was a Royal Navy officer who rose to the rank of captain and won medals for his service during the Crimean War and the Second Opium War.

== Early life ==
Carey was born on 7 May 1838, the fourth son of De Vic Carey of Le Vallon, Guernsey. According to The Star of Guernsey, the Careys were one of that island's most "distinguished and oldest families".

== Career ==
Carey passed his Royal Navy examination in seamanship in April 1856. He served on HMS Sans Pareil, a 70-gun ship of the line commanded by Captain Astley Cooper Key. From January 1858, Carey served on HMS Esk under Captain Sir Robert M'Clure when the ship was engaged in the capture of Canton during the Second Opium War. Carey was promoted to acting-lieutenant in 1857 for his conduct during that engagement. His promotion was confirmed in 1858 and he served on HMS Queen in the Mediterranean.

Carey was promoted to commander on 4 August 1868 and retired with the rank of captain on 4 August 1883.

== Personal life ==
Carey married Augusta Colebrook Miller, eldest daughter of the late James Miller MD, of Welbeck Street, London, on 18 March 1879. The couple had no children. Their home in Guernsey was Calais House.

== Death ==
Carey died 14 March 1891, at Totteridge House, the home of his brother-in-law Spencer H. Curtis in Totteridge, north London. He is buried at St Andrew's church, Totteridge.
