= Ḵwiḵwa̱sutʼinux̱w Ha̱xwaʼmis First Nation =

First Nation government in British Columbia, Canada

Ḵwiḵwa̱sutʼinux̱w Ha̱xwaʼmis, formerly the Kwicksutaineuk-ah-kwa-mish First Nation is a First Nations band government based on northern Vancouver Island in British Columbia, Canada, in the Queen Charlotte Strait region. It is a member of the Musgamagw Dzawadaʼenuxw Tribal Council, along with the Gwawaenuk Tribe and the Dzawada̱ʼenux̱w First Nation. The Kwikwasutʼinuxw and Haxwaʼmis are two of the many subgroups of the peoples known as Kwakwakaʼwakw, which has two meanings: "smoke of the world" or "beach at the north side of the river."

The territory of the Ḵwiḵwa̱sutʼinux̱w Ha̱xwaʼmis spans the southern Broughton Archipelago and the Gilford Island area just north of the mouth of Knight Inlet. Their main village is Gwaʼyasdams or Gwayasdums, a small community located on Gilford Island.

== Governance ==
=== Structure ===
Over the past few years, the governance of the community has been entrusted to three officials (Chief and Council), who are democratically elected by the members of the community. The Chief and Council collaborate to formulate policies and programs that advance economic and social progress, preserve cultural heritage, and protect the environment. Typically, they hold bi-weekly meetings, though they may convene more frequently to address urgent matters.

=== Laws ===
Their laws and practices related to land management emphasize sustainability and stewardship, with a focus on maintaining the health and well-being of the land and its resources. The Ḵwiḵwa̱sutʼinux̱w Ha̱xwaʼmis First Nation has customary laws related to governance and decision-making that emphasize community involvement, collaboration, consensus-building, and respect for diverse perspectives.

== Culture ==
=== Language ===
The Ḵwiḵwa̱sutʼinux̱w Ha̱xwaʼmis First Nation people possess a rich culture and language, which is an integral part of their identity and heritage. Their language, the Ḵwiḵwa̱sutʼinux̱w Ha̱xwaʼmis First Nation language, is unique with its own sounds and grammar, and there are ongoing efforts to revitalize and preserve it through educational and cultural programs. The language is tonal, with words pronounced in high, middle, low, rising, or falling tones.

=== Traditional way of life ===
Traditionally, fishing was a significant part of their livelihood, and they fished for salmon, herring, halibut, and other species using a variety of methods, such as nets, traps, and hook and line. The fishing season started in spring with Chinook salmon and continued until the end of the chum fishing season in the fall. During winter, the people remained in their winter villages and engaged in very little food gathering.

Besides that, they hunted deer, elk, and other animals in the forests and mountains of their territory. They also trapped beavers and other fur-bearing animals for their pelts, which were used in clothing and other items.

== Challenges ==
The Ḵwiḵwa̱sutʼinux̱w Ha̱xwaʼmis First Nation people have faced a number of challenges over the years. There is no year-round road access to any of the villages of the Kwikwasutʼinuxw Haxwaʼmis First Nation. Access is only by boat and all consumables and household products must be shipped in. Its citizens have been operating under a boil water advisory for 9 years.

=== Housing crisis ===
Issues such as inadequate housing, poverty, and lack of infrastructure, which are the result of systemic and historical injustices, are faced by many Indigenous communities in Canada.

The Ḵwiḵwa̱sutʼinux̱w Ha̱xwaʼmis First Nation had previously faced a crisis related to housing and had implemented solutions. Ḵwiḵwa̱sutʼinux̱w Ha̱xwaʼmis First Nation had built affordable housing units using sustainable and locally sourced materials.

=== Against open-net fish farms ===
In 2012, the AFN has called for the phase-out of open-net fish farms and the adoption of sustainable, land-based alternatives. In 2016, members of the Ḵwiḵwa̱sutʼinux̱w Ha̱xwaʼmis First Nation, along with members of other First Nations, have occupied a fish farm operated by Marine Harvest, a Norwegian company, in their traditional territory. The occupation is part of an ongoing protest against open-net fish farms, which First Nations argue are harming wild salmon populations and polluting their traditional territories.

== See also ==
- The Canadian Crown and Aboriginal peoples

== Indian reserves ==
Indian reserves under the band's administration are:

- Ahta Indian Reserve No. 3, at the mouth of the Ohta River on Bond Sound, Tribune Channel north of Gilford Island, 7.10 ha. 50°52′00″N 126°10′00″W
- Alalco Indian Reserve No. 8, at the mouth of the Wakeman River at the north end of Wakeman Sound, 118.70 ha. 51°04′00″N 126°32′00″W,
- Dakiulis Indian Reserve No. 7, at the tip of Islet Point on the west side of Gilford Island, 0.70 ha. 50°44′00″N 126°34′00″W
- Dug-da-myse Indian Reserve No. 12, on the west shore of Wakeman Sound, 1.60 ha. 51°02′00″N 126°31′00″W
- Gwayasdums Indian Reserve No. 1, on the west shore of Gilford Island on Retreat Pass, 25.40 ha.50°42′00″N 126°36′00″W
- Kakweken Indian Reserve No. 4, at the mouth of the Kakweiken River at the head of Thompson Sound, off Tribune Channel, 4.0 ha. 50°48′00″N 126°02′00″W
- Kye-yaa-la Indian Reserve No. 1, the whole of Sail Island in Retreat Passage, including small off-shore islands, 9.60 ha. 50°42′00″N 126°37′00″W
- Kyidagwis Indian Reserve No. 2, on the western shore of Wakeman Sound, Kingcome Inlet, 4.50 ha. 51°01′00″N 126°33′00″W
- Kyimla Indian Reserve No. 11, on Trafford Point on the east side of Gilford Island, 1.10 ha. 50°44′00″N 126°09′00″W
- Meetup Indian Reserve No. 2, at the head of Viner Sound on Gilford Island, 6.40 ha. 50°47′30″N 126°23′10″W
