= Mamalilikulla-qwe'qwa'sot'em Band =

First Nation government in British Columbia, Canada

The Mamalilikulla-qwe'qwa'sot'em Band is a First Nations band government based on northern Vancouver Island in British Columbia, Canada. The home territory of the Mamalilikulla and Qwe'Qwa'Sot'Em groups of Kwakwaka'wakw was in the maze of islands and inlets of the eastern Queen Charlotte Strait region around the opening of Knight Inlet, mainly on Village Island, where their principal village Memkumlis is (often known by the name Mamalilikulla).

The band is a member of the Kwakiutl District Council.

== Indian reserves ==
The band has three reserves:

- Apsagayu Indian Reserve No. 1A, Shoal Harbour, Gilford Island, 0.90 ha. 50°44′00″N 126°29′00″W
- Compton Island Indian Reserve No. 6, all of Compton Island between Harbledown and Swanson Islands, 56.30 ha. 50°36′00″N 126°41′00″W
- Mahmalillikullah Indian Reserve No. 1, on the west end of Village Island facing Eliot Passage, including 3 small off-shore islands, 175.20 ha. 50°37′00″N 126°34′00″W

Under the terms of a proposed separation of the band into two new bands, Apsagayu IR No. 1A would be the only reserve for the smaller of the two resulting bands, the Mamalilikulla Band and the Wiamasgum-Qwe'Qwa'Sot'Em Band. The proposed division of the two bands relates to the history of the destruction of Gwayasdums in 1856 when the surviving Kwicksutaneuk of that village were mostly taken in by the Mamalilikulla, and subsequent Indian Reserve Commissions by Peter O'Reilly and other actions and documentation by the Department of Indian and Northern Affairs effectively amalgamated the two peoples as one band. The position of the Mamalilikulla and Qwe'Qwa'Sot'Enox is that this merger was illegal and they want it undone. The Qwe-Qwa-Sot'Enox are the families within the band self-identity, as distinct from the Kwikwasut'inuxw, the other group of descendants of survivors of the destruction of Gwayasdums who are now part of the Kwikwasut'inuxw Haxwa'mis First Nation.

== See also ==
- Kwak'wala (language)
