= Burdwood Group Conservancy =

Conservancy in British Columbia, Canada

- IUCN category II (national park)
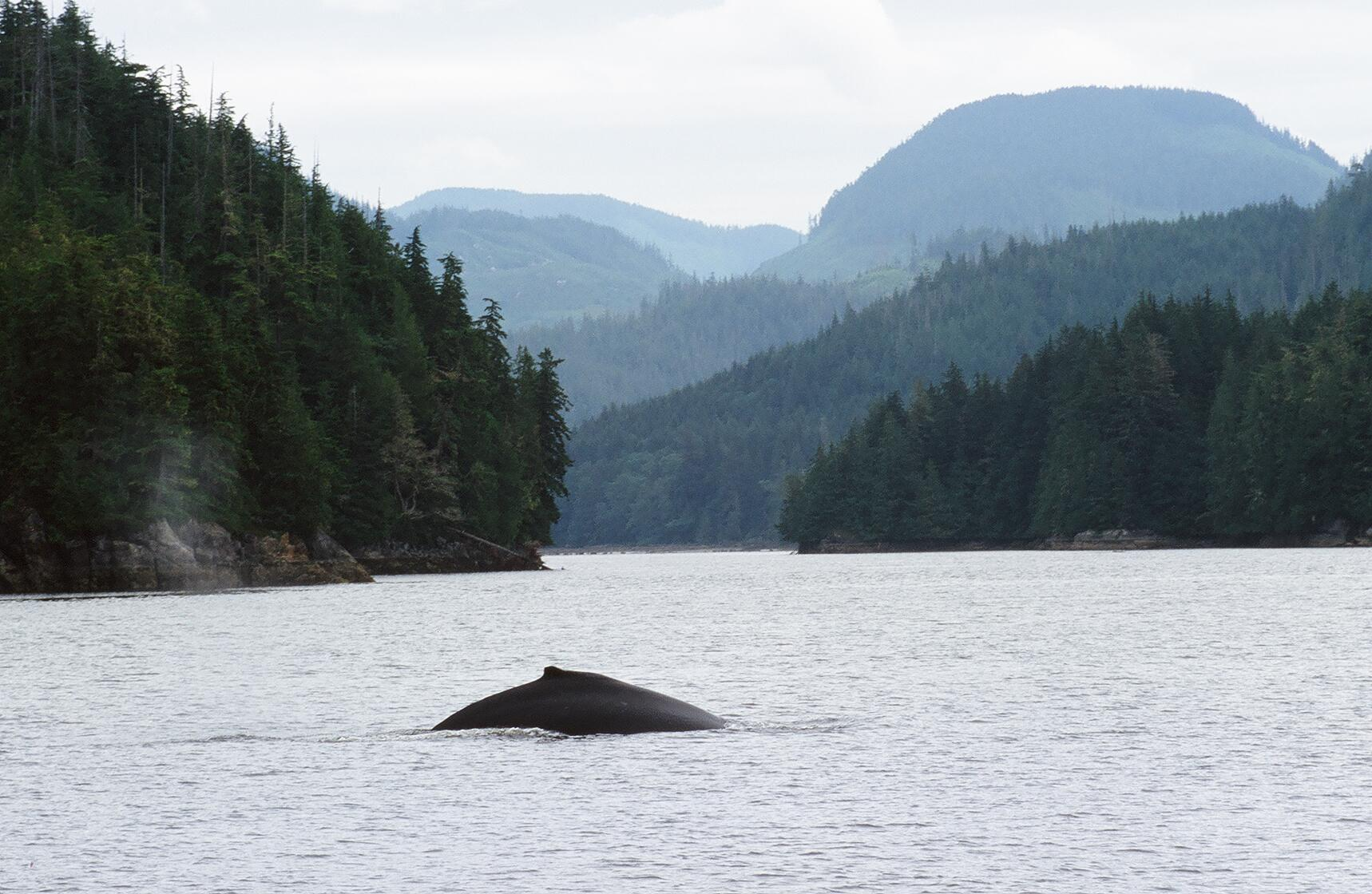
- Humpback whale surfacing within Burdwood Group Conservancy

- Location within British Columbia
- Location: Mount Waddington RD, British Columbia
- Nearest city: Port Hardy
- Coordinates: 50°47′50″N 126°28′25″W
- Area: 121 ha (300 acres)
- Designation: Conservancy
- Established: 13 March 2009
- Governing body: BC Parks

The Burdwood Group Conservancy is a conservancy located in the Broughton Archipelago in Mount Waddington Regional District, British Columbia. It was established by BC Parks on 13 March 2009 to protect a unique cluster of forested islands and islets situated at the entrance to Tribune Channel.

== Geography ==
The Burdwood Group is located between the islands of Broughton and Gillford in the Broughton Archipelago. The islands are surrounded by Raleigh Channel to the west, Fife Sound to the southwest, Hornet Passage to the southeast, and Tribune Channel to the north.

== Ecology ==
The Burdwood Group is a centre for biodiversity in the region. The forested islands are an important habitat for coastal bird species. The foreshore of the islands host productive butter clam and littleneck clam populations. The marine environment around the islands hosts a moderately sized kelp bed frequented by a variety of marine mammals and fish species, most notably Pacific salmon.

== Culture ==
The islands feature culturally significant sites and traditional use areas of the Mamalilikulla-Qwe’Qwa’Sot’Em and other First Nations in the area. These include culturally significant shell middens and intertidal clam gardens.

== Access ==
The islands are accessible via sea kayak or boat. Camping on the islands is permitted but no facilities are provided.

== See also ==
- Alert Bay
