= Apsigiyu =

Coordinates: 50°44′00″N 126°29′00″W

Apsigiyu or Apsigayu or Apsagayu is a village site of the Kwikwasut'inuxw and Mamalilikulla groups of the Kwakwaka'wakw peoples, located at the head of Shoal Harbour on the northwest side of Gilford Island, in the Queen Charlotte Strait-Johnstone Strait region of the Central Coast of British Columbia, Canada. The village, whose name means "otherside forehead" in Kwak'wala, is used for clam and salmon harvesting, and also for timber harvesting. The village's site is an Indian reserve, Apsagayu Indian Reserve No. 1A, 2.2 ha., and is under the administration of the Mamalilikulla-Qwe'Qwa'Sot'Em Band, along with two others, Compton IR No. 6 and Mahmalillikullah Indian Reserve No. 1, which is the site of Memkumlis, the main village site of the Mamalillikula, which is often referred to as Mamalillikulla.

Under the terms of a proposed separation of the band into two new bands, Apsagayu IR No. 1A would be the only reserve for the smaller of the two resulting bands, the Mamalilikulla Band and the Wiamasgum-Qwe'Qwa'Sot'Em Band. The proposed division of the two bands relates to the history of the destruction of Gwayasdums in 1856 when the surviving Kwicksutaneuk of that village were mostly taken in by the Mamalilikulla, and subsequent Indian Reserve Commissions by Peter O'Reilly and other actions and documentation by the Department of Indian and Northern Affairs effectively amalgamated the two peoples as one band. The position of the Mamalilikulla and Qwe'Qwa'Sot'Enox is that this merger was illegal and they want it undone. The Qwe-Qwa-Sot'Enox are the families within the band self-identity, as distinct from the Kwikwasut'inuxw, the other group of descendants of survivors of the destruction of Gwayasdums who are now part of the Kwikwasut'inuxw Haxwa'mis First Nation.

== See also ==
- List of Kwakwaka'wakw villages
- List of Indian reserves in British Columbia
