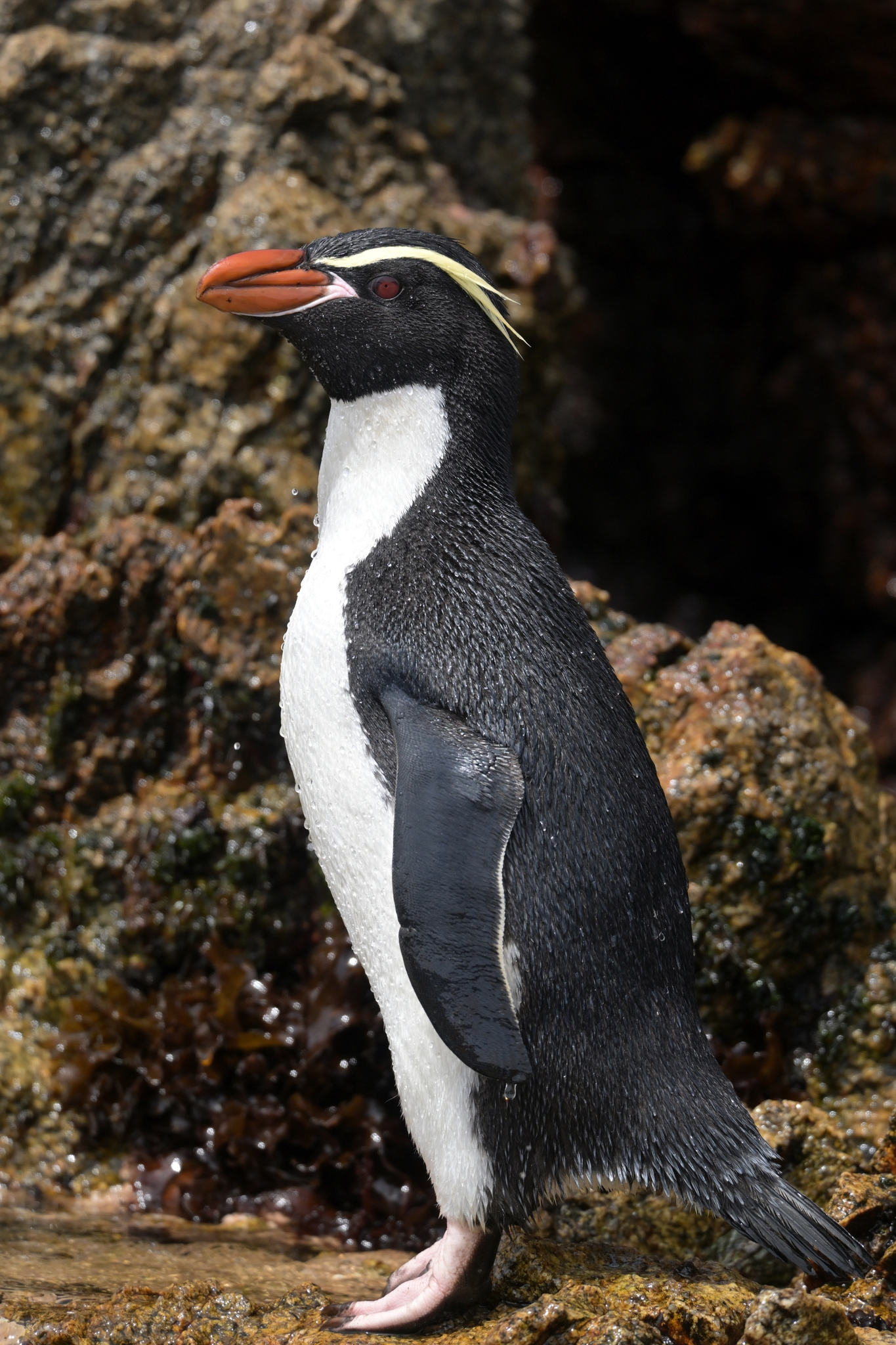

Conservation status
- Vulnerable (IUCN 3.1)

Scientific classification
- Kingdom: Animalia
- Phylum: Chordata
- Class: Aves
- Order: Sphenisciformes
- Family: Spheniscidae
- Genus: Eudyptes
- Species: E. robustus

Binomial name
- Eudyptes robustus Oliver, 1953
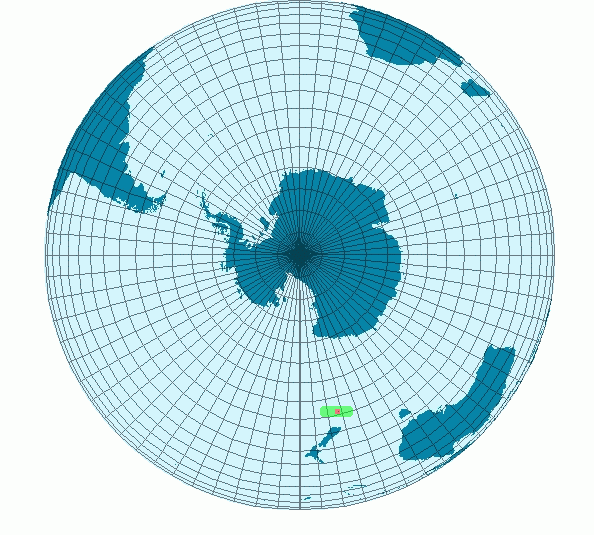
- Distribution of the Snares penguin in green

= Snares penguin =

Species of bird

The Snares penguin (Eudyptes robustus; Māori: Pokotiwha), also known as the Snares crested penguin and the Snares Islands penguin, is a penguin from New Zealand. The species breeds on the Snares Islands, a group of islands off the southern coast of the South Island. It is a yellow-crested penguin, with a size of 50–70 cm (19.5–27.5 in) and a weight of 2.5–4 kg (5.5–8.8 lb). It has dark blue-black upper parts and white underparts. It has a bright yellow eyebrow-stripe which extends over the eye to form a drooping, bushy crest. It has bare pink skin at the base of its large red-brown bill.

The species nests in colonies ranging in size from around 10 nests to around 1200, under forest cover or the open. The main colonies are located on North East Island; other colonies are established on Broughton Island as well as the rocky Western Chain.

The Snares penguin's main prey is krill, supplemented by squid and small fish. The species is rated as vulnerable by the International Union for Conservation of Nature (IUCN) as its breeding range is restricted to one small island group. The population is estimated at around 25,000 breeding pairs.

== Taxonomy ==
Snares penguins were originally collected in 1874 and named atrata by Frederick Hutton. However, Hutton lost his sample at sea whilst drawing the bird before a full speciation could be identified. A description written by Hutton and an illustration done by Keulemans in Buller's A History of the Birds of New Zealand are evidence that this is the same penguin previously identified by Hutton.

However, there is some debate over the classification of this penguin, and Oliver was able to successfully propose that a few slight anatomical differences did exist between the Snares penguins and the early description and illustration, leading the Snares penguin to be called robustus instead of atratus.

== Distribution and habitat ==
The Snares penguin is named after the place in which it breeds —the Snares Islands. The Snares Islands are a small group of islands off the coast of southern New Zealand. Although little is known of their range and migration outside of the breeding season, it is not thought that they migrate far in the winters. Occasional sightings have occurred on the coasts of Tasmania, southern Australia, the Chatham Islands, Stewart Island, and the southern New Zealand mainland. There are approximately 25,000 living pairs of Snares penguins.

Snares penguins nest in dense colonies under the tree cover of the Olearia forests or on coastal rocks. To build a nest, the penguins dig up shallow holes in the ground and layer the bottom with grass, leaves, twigs, peat, or pebbles. A small rim of mud is added to the rim of the nest to raise it above ground level. Vegetation at nesting sites dies dues to the dense nesting activities, and the colony moves to a new nesting site. Colonies nesting near streams may have some advantage, as the stream provides water for drinking and bathing. However, it is not essential that nesting colonies are located near a stream and many are far from any stream.

== Description ==
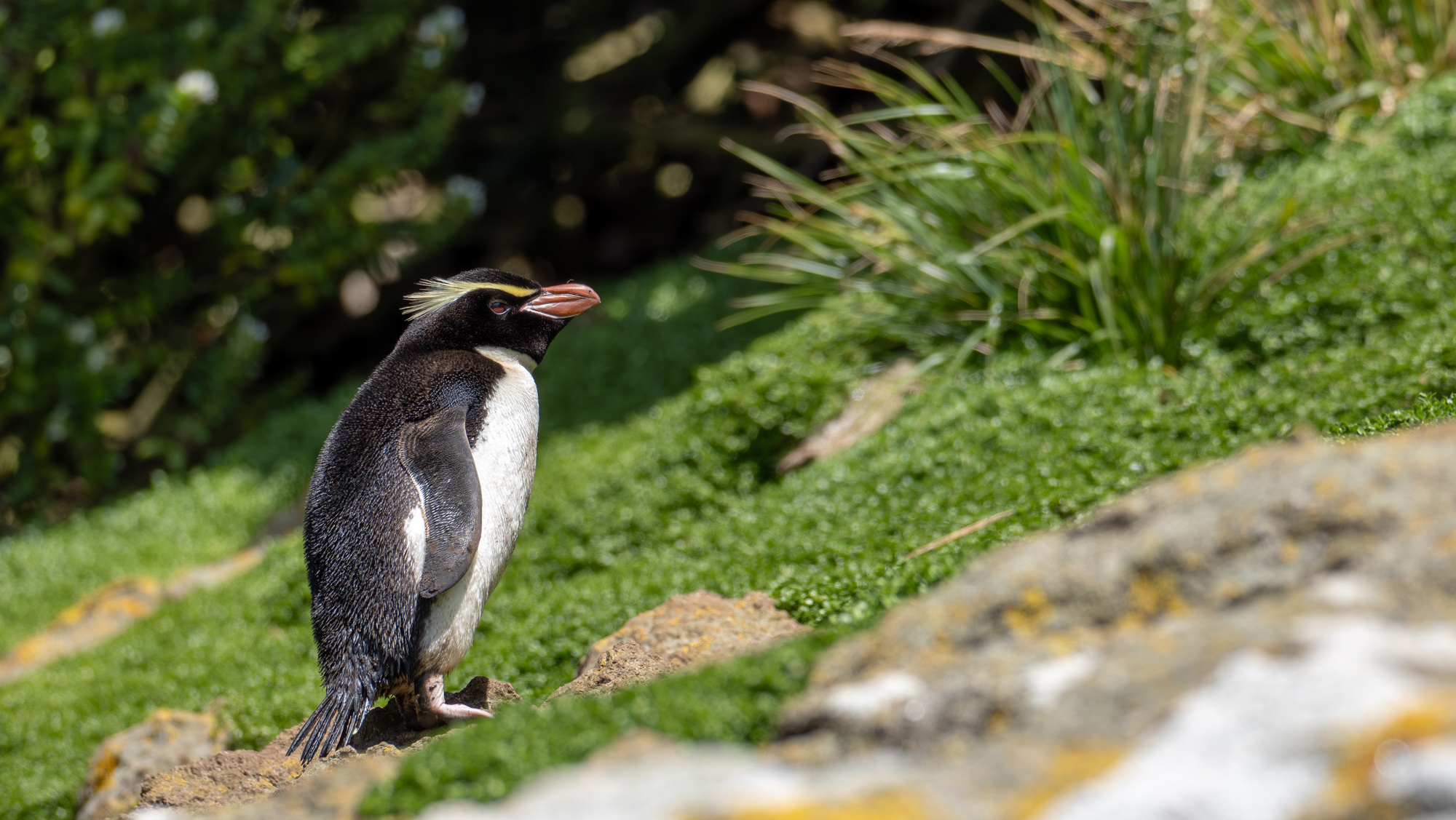
Snares penguin

The Snares penguin is often compared to the Fiordland penguin (Eudyptes pachyrhynchus), which is related by the genus of crested penguins (Eudyptes). Snares penguins can be distinguished from Fiordland penguins by a patch of skin at the base of their beaks. The Snares penguin is similarly coloured to other species of penguins, having a black head, back and flippers with a white belly. A bright-yellow crest, beginning at the base of the bill, runs along the upper part of the head on both sides and ends at the back of the head. It has a thick reddish-brown beak, traced with light pink skin at the base. The eyes are generally described as a bright red-brown colour, but this colouration can vary somewhat between individuals and in different lighting. The colour patterns under the wings differ from individual to individual, so it is not a good characteristic for species identification.

The penguin can make a large variety of vocal noises. It is difficult to verbally describe these noises, but they range from hisses and explosive cries when threatened to rhythmical braying and trumpeting sounds that can be heard from long distances at sea.

== Behaviour ==
=== Diet ===
The diet of Snares penguins usually consists of krill of the species Nyctiphanes australis, small fish (including codlings), and squid such as Nototodarus sloanii and Moroteuthopsis ingens. One study found that about 60 percent of the mass of stomach contents from Snares penguins consisted of krill, 30 percent was fish, and about 10 percent was cephalopods. The researchers concluded that the number of fish otoliths and cephalopod beaks indicated the importance of these types of prey to adult penguins while at sea. Another study reports the diet consisting of about 55 percent krill, 24 percent fish, and 21 percent cephalopods, also suggesting that fish and cephalopods are more important prey types than the percentages of stomach composition indicate.

=== Foraging ecology ===
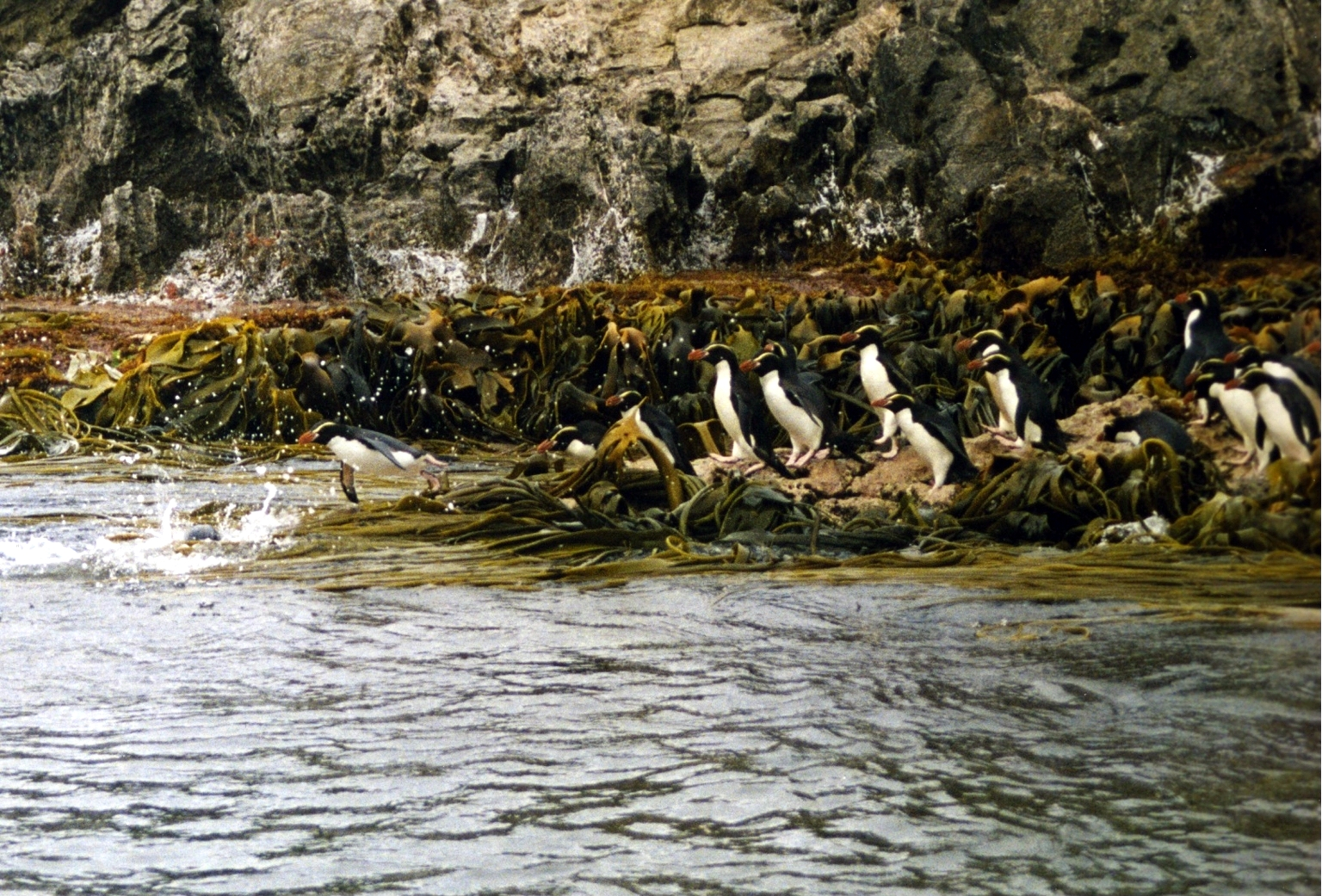
Diving Snares penguins

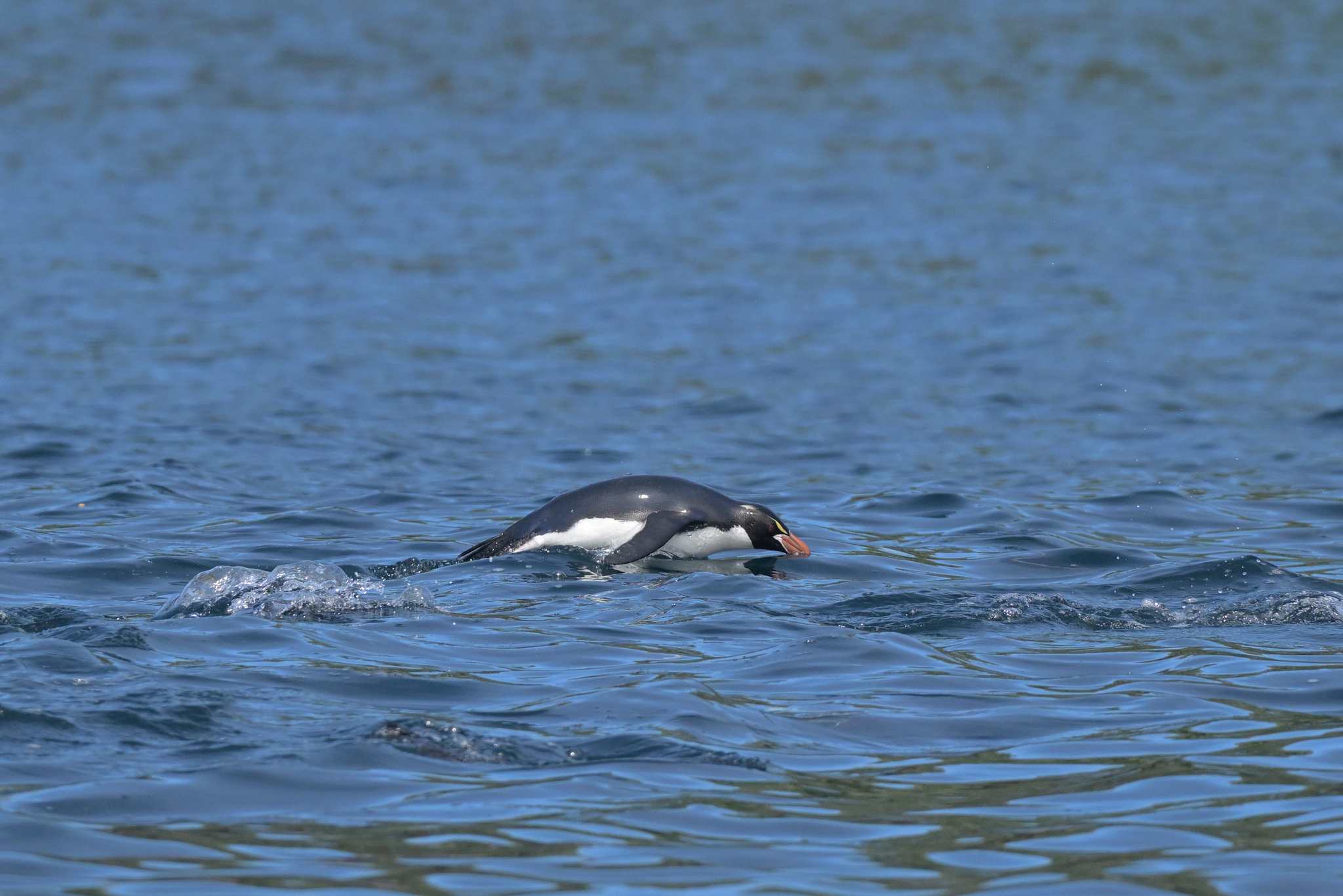
Swimming

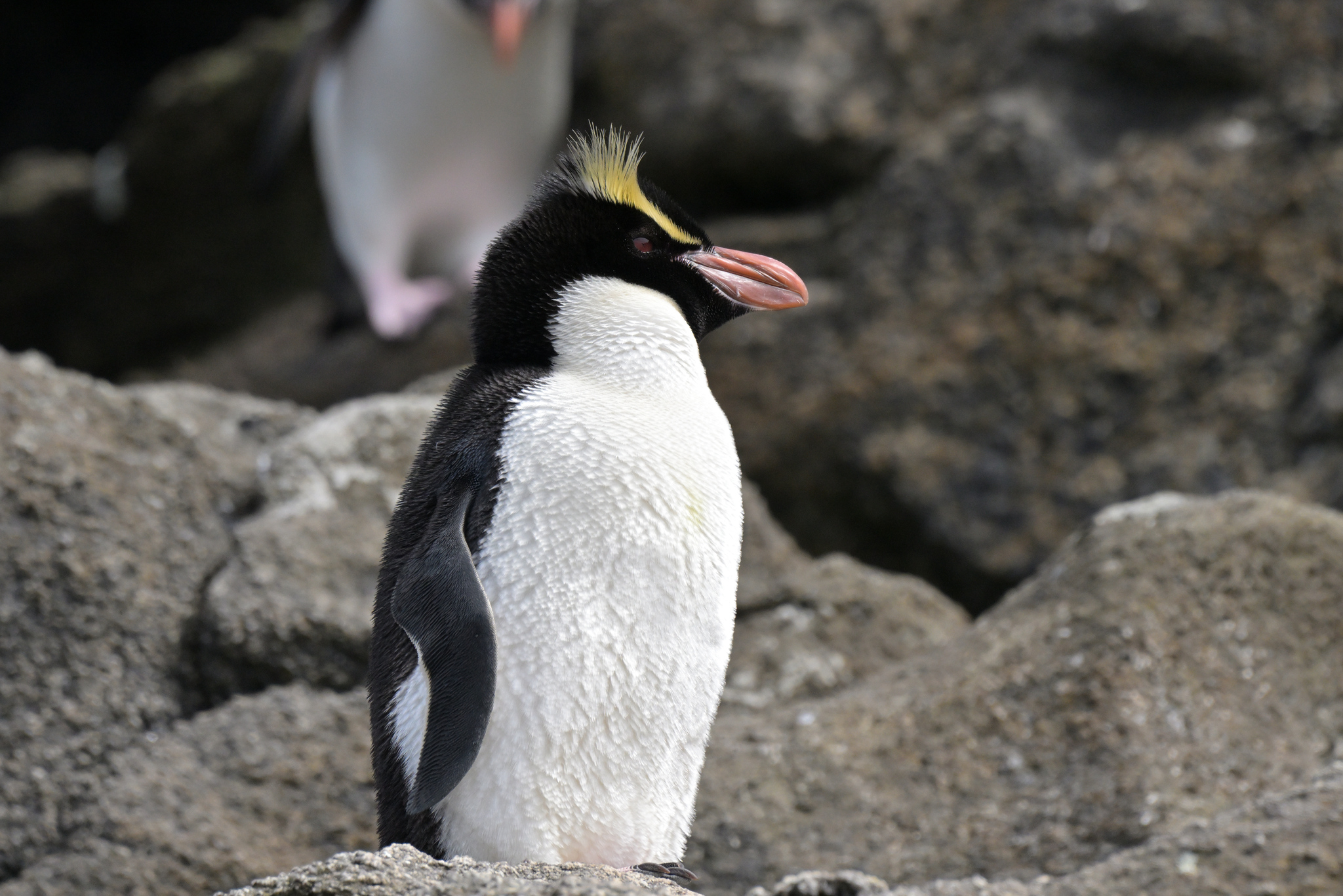
With crest standing erect, North East Island

The foraging patterns of breeding Snares penguins are well defined. After shared incubation of eggs, males leave on two-week-long foraging trips, which has been found to be synchronised with spring plankton blooms, as they are reliable predictors of food sources. Upon the return of the males, the females go on somewhat shorter foraging trips (less than a week), returning in time for the chicks to hatch. Throughout the chick guard stage, the female is the lone provider of food performing short foraging trips (one to three days). While male penguins performing long foraging trips reach depths of up to 120 m, chick rearing birds usually exhibit shallow pursuit diving strategies (average dive depths 20–40 m) to catch prey.

=== Predators ===
Predators of adult Snares penguins are sea lions and leopard seals. Their eggs and chicks are vulnerable to predation by skuas and petrels.

=== Courtship and breeding ===
The breeding season of Snares penguins occurs in the summer of New Zealand, beginning in early September and ending in late January. Snares penguins begin reproducing in the age range of 5 to 9 years old. To court females, single males stand erect with their wings spread out and pumping their chest. It is likely that the pairs remain faithful to each other for more than one season. The pairs then build a nest, most of the work being done by the male. The female lays two eggs, typically about three to five days apart, which hatch 31–37 days later. The second laid egg is up to 85 percent larger than the first and also hatches first. The smaller, later-hatched chick is outcompeted by its siblings and usually does not survive, also called "siblicide". Egg-size dimorphism is particularly large in Snares penguins, and the larger egg hatching first only accentuates the sibling size difference.

Hatching pattern and size-dimorphic eggs are two of the mechanisms by which birds can change their breeding pattern in response to environmental and breeding conditions. In altricial birds, such as Snares penguins, egg-size variation and asynchronous hatching are adaptive mechanisms that may lead to brood reduction. However, Snares penguins and other members of their genus, Eudyptes, differ from most other birds in that their last laid egg is larger and hatches first rather than being the smallest and last to hatch.

Egg incubation does not occur until both eggs have been laid, and they are usually incubated one in front of the other. The smaller, first-laid egg is often placed in the anterior position for incubation, which is thought to be the less favourable location since they have lower and more variable temperatures during incubation. Although the smaller, first egg receives less favourable incubation, it was found that egg-size dimorphism affects the hatching pattern in Snares penguins instead of egg incubation position. Both parents incubate the eggs. For the first ten days, they alternate. Then the male leaves for an extended period (about 12 days) to forage for food, while the mother stays with the eggs. When he returns, the roles are reversed. Also, upon his return, the pair engages in a display of bowing and trumpeting, which further strengthens their bond.

For the first three weeks after hatching, the male guards the chicks from predators while the female searches for food, returning each day to feed her offspring. It was observed that parents can recognise their chicks and chicks can recognise their parents. The study found that calls between chick and parent were more important for recognition than visual cues. The parents provide food for their young each day until it has moulted and can forage for its own food. The chicks fledge at approximately 11 weeks.

== Conservation ==
Although Snares penguins are not currently threatened, they are considered a vulnerable species. If a threat arose, it could quickly wipe out their population because their breeding grounds are confined to a small island group. Possible threats include the introduction of a new predator, overfishing around the islands that would deplete their food source, increasing water temperatures from global warming driving prey away, and pollution. The New Zealand government has taken action to protect the Snares Islands habitats and marine feeding grounds.
