= Broughton =

Broughton may refer to:

== People ==
- Broughton (name)

== Places ==
=== Australia ===
- Broughton, New South Wales
  - Broughton Vale, New South Wales
  - Broughton Village, New South Wales
  - Broughton Creek, New South Wales
  - Broughton Mill Creek, New South Wales
- Broughton Island (New South Wales)
- Broughton, Queensland, a locality in the Charters Towers Region, Queensland
- Broughton, Victoria
- Broughton River (South Australia)
- Port Broughton, South Australia

=== Canada ===
- Broughton, Nova Scotia
- Broughton Archipelago, British Columbia
  - Broughton Island (British Columbia), an island in that archipelago
  - North Broughton Island, to the north of Broughton Island
  - Broughton Point, on the south coast of North Broughton Island
- the Broughton Strait off the north coast of Vancouver Island, between that island and Queen Charlotte Strait
- the Broughton Peaks, a small group of peaks in the Barkley Sound region of the west coast of Vancouver Island

=== Jamaica ===
- Broughton, Jamaica

=== United Kingdom ===
==== England ====
- Broughton, Aylesbury, Buckinghamshire
- Broughton, Cambridgeshire
- Broughton, Claverley, Shropshire, a location
- Broughton, Cumbria
- Broughton, Hampshire
- Broughton, Lancashire
- Broughton, Lincolnshire
- Broughton, Milton Keynes, Buckinghamshire
- Broughton, Northamptonshire
- Broughton, east North Yorkshire
- Broughton, west North Yorkshire
- Broughton, Oxfordshire
  - Broughton Castle, Oxfordshire
- Broughton, Salford, Greater Manchester
  - Broughton Suspension Bridge, 1831 collapse
- Broughton, Shropshire, in Myddle, Broughton and Harmer Hill
- Broughton, Staffordshire, a location
- Broughton Astley, Leicestershire
- Broughton Beck, Cumbria
- Broughton Crossing, Buckinghamshire
- Broughton Gifford, Wiltshire
- Broughton Hackett, Worcestershire
- Broughton Poggs, Oxfordshire
- Broughton-in-Furness, Cumbria
- Belbroughton, Worcestershire
- Brant Broughton, Lincolnshire
- Church Broughton, Derbyshire
- Drakes Broughton, Worcestershire
- Field Broughton, Cumbria
- Great Broughton, North Yorkshire
- Nether Broughton, Leicestershire
- Upper Broughton, Nottinghamshire

==== Scotland ====
- Broughton, Edinburgh
- Broughton, Orkney, a location
- Broughton, Scottish Borders

==== Wales ====
- Broughton, Flintshire
- Broughton, Vale of Glamorgan
- Broughton, Wrexham, a Welsh community
  - New Broughton, Wrexham
  - Pentre Broughton
- Tybroughton

=== United States ===
- Broughton, Illinois
- Broughton, Ohio
- Broughton, Pennsylvania

== Sport ==
- Broughton RUFC, an English rugby union club
- Broughton Park RUFC, an English rugby union club
- Broughton Rangers, an English rugby league club

== Other uses ==
- Broughton Anglican College, Menangle, New South Wales, Australia
- Broughton High School, Edinburgh, Scotland, United Kingdom
- Needham B. Broughton High School, Raleigh, North Carolina, United States
- Broughton Hospital, a psychiatric treatment facility, Morganton, North Carolina, United States
- Broughton House, a town house in Scotland
- Broughton House, Parramatta, a heritage-listed residence in Australia
- Broughton House, Raleigh, a mansion in Raleigh, North Carolina, United States
- Jolly-Broughton House, a mansion in Raleigh, North Carolina, United States
- Broughton (HBC vessel), see Hudson's Bay Company vessels
