= Broughton Island =

Broughton Island may refer to:

- Broughton Island (New South Wales)
- Broughton Island, Western Australia
- Broughton Island (British Columbia), Canada
  - North Broughton Island, British Columbia, Canada
- Broughton Island (Nunavut), island where the community of Qikiqtarjuaq is located
  - Qikiqtarjuaq (formerly Broughton Island), Nunavut, Canada
- Broughton Island, New Zealand
- Broughton Island, Georgia, USA

== National adaptations of originally english name ==
- Broutona Island, Russia — named after William Robert Broughton

== See also ==
- Broughton Archipelago, British Columbia, Canada
