= Kye-yaa-la Indian Reserve No. 1 =

Coordinates: 50.689°N 126.609°W

Kye-yaa-la Indian Reserve No. 1, officially Kye-yaa-la 1, is an Indian reserve, comprising the whole of Sail Island and including three small islands, in Retreat Passage to the west of Gilford Island, and east of Bonwick Island in the Johnstone Strait region of the Central Coast of British Columbia, Canada. The reserve is 9.6 ha. in size and is under the administration of the Kwikwasut'inuxw Haxwa'mis First Nation band government.

== See also ==
- List of Indian reserves in British Columbia
