= Susukw =

Coordinates: 50°39′40″N 126°22′40″W

Susukw was a Kwakwaka'wakw village on the south side of Gilford Island, facing Gilford Bay in the Johnstone Strait region of the Central Coast of British Columbia, Canada. The village site, which is to the east of Port Elizabeth, was a fishing, gardening and timber harvesting site for the Mamalilikulla subgroup of the Kwakwaka'wakw.

== See also ==
- List of Kwakwaka'wakw villages
