= Thompson Sound =

Thompson Sound may refer to

- Thompson Sound, British Columbia, Canada, an unincorporated locality
- Thompson Sound (British Columbia), Canada, a sound in the area of the Broughton Archipelago
- Thompson Sound (New Zealand), an indentation in the coast of Fiordland National Park
