= Kumlah Island =

Island in British Columbia, Canada

- Interactive map of Kumlah Island

Geography
- Location: Tribune Channel
- Coordinates: 50°44′24″N 126°9′48″W

Administration
- Canada
- Province: British Columbia
- Regional district: Coast Land District

Kumlah Island is a small, uninhabited island in British Columbia, Canada. It is located south of Gilford Island in the waters of Tribune Channel.
