= Alert Stack =

Outlying island of New Zealand

Geography
- Location: Snares Islands
- Coordinates: 48°02′15″S 166°34′30″E
- Area: 14 ha (35 acres)
- Length: 400 m (1300 ft)
- Width: 400 m (1300 ft)

Administration
- New Zealand
- Region: New Zealand outlying islands

Demographics
- Population: uninhabited

Alert Stack is an outlying island of New Zealand. It is a part of the Snares Islands, lying southwest of North East Island. There is an estimated five pairs of nesting Antarctic tern as of 2018.
