= Metap =

Former Kwakwaka'wakw village in Canada

Coordinates: 50°47′30″N 126°23′10″W

Metap, also mit'ap and Meetup and Mit'apdzi and big mit'ap ] is a former Kwakwaka'wakw village at the head of Viner Sound on the northwest coast of Gilford Island in the Queen Charlotte Strait region of the Central Coast of British Columbia, Canada. There is an Indian reserve, Meetup Indian Reserve No. 2, at the location today.

The village and associated fishing area were used by the Kwicksutaineuk and Mamalilikulla divisions of the Kwakwaka'wakw. During his work allocating lands for native groups, Commissioner Sproat designated the location as a fishing site for the Mamalilikulla in 1879, later designating it Meetup IR No. 2. The site was originally owned by the Kwicksataineuk.

== See also ==
- List of Kwakwaka'wakw villages
