= Broughton Peaks =

Group of mountains in British Columbia, Canada

Coordinates: 48°59′45″N 125°13′31″W

The Broughton Peaks are a group of low mountain summits west of the south end of Effingham Inlet, to the north of Bamfield in the Barkley Sound region of the west coast of Vancouver Island, British Columbia, Canada.

== Name origin ==
Like other "Broughton" placenames in British Columbia, they were named for Commodore William Robert Broughton of HMS Chatham, and were named by Captain Pender in 1860.

== See also ==
- Broughton (disambiguation)
