= Elachista laquaeorum =

Scientific classification
- Kingdom: Animalia
- Phylum: Arthropoda
- Class: Insecta
- Order: Lepidoptera
- Family: Elachistidae
- Genus: Elachista
- Species: E. laquaeorum

Binomial name
- Elachista laquaeorum (Dugdale, 1971)

Synonyms
- Cosmiotes laquaeorum Dugdale, 1971

Species of moth

Elachista laquaeorum is a species of moth in the family Elachistidae. It was described by John S. Dugdale in 1971. It is found on the Snares Islands south of New Zealand.

The wingspan is 6.4-6.6 mm.
