= Thompson Sound, British Columbia =

Thompson Sound
- Location of Thompson Sound in British Columbia
- Coordinates: 50°48′00″N 126°01′00″W
- Country: Canada
- Province: British Columbia
- Area codes: 250, 778

Thompson Sound is an unincorporated locality on the east side of the sound of the same name, which is in the area of Tribune Channel and the Broughton Archipelago in the Central Coast region of British Columbia, Canada.
