= The Viscounts =

The Viscounts may refer to:

- The Viscounts (American band)
- The Viscounts (British band)

== See also ==
- Viscount
- Viscount (disambiguation)
