= Grypotheca horningae =

Scientific classification
- Kingdom: Animalia
- Phylum: Arthropoda
- Clade: Pancrustacea
- Class: Insecta
- Order: Lepidoptera
- Family: Psychidae
- Genus: Grypotheca
- Species: G. horningae

Binomial name
- Grypotheca horningae Dugdale, 1987

Species of moth

Grypotheca horningae is a moth of the family Psychidae. It was described by John S. Dugdale in 1987. It is endemic to New Zealand and is only known from the Snares Islands. The species is named in honour of Carol J. Horning who collected the holotype specimen in 1972.
