= Fife Sound =

Sound located in Central British Columbia

Coordinates: 50°47′00″N 126°38′00″W

Fife Sound is a sound in the Broughton Archipelago of the Central Coast of British Columbia, Canada.

== Location ==
The Broughton Archipelago is on the north side of the Queen Charlotte Strait region, adjacent to the mainland. Fife Sound is located on the south side of Broughton Island, which is the largest of the group.
