= Watson Island (disambiguation) =

Watson Island may refer to:

- Watson Island, an island in the city of Miami, United States
- Watson Island (Queensland), Australia
- Watson's Island, County Down, is a townland in County Down, Northern Ireland
- Watson Island (British Columbia), at the entrance to Mackenzie Sound on the north side of the Broughton Archipelago, on the Central Coast of British Columbia, Canada
- Watson Island (Port Edward), an unincorporated area in Port Edward, on the North Coast of British Columbia
- Watson Island (Algoma), in the Algoma District of Ontario, Canada
- Watson Island (Muskoka), in the Muskoka region of Ontario, Canada
- Watson Islands, Nunavut, Canada
