= Kamla (Kwakwaka'wakw village) =

Coordinates: 50°44′24″N 126°09′48″W

Kamla, meaning "to cut on rock" in Kwak'wala, is a village of the Kwakwaka'wakw peoples, located on the southeast side of Gilford Island on Tribune Channel. The village site is on Kumlah Island, and was a camp of the Dlidligit and Kwicksutaineuk. It is under the administration of the Kwikwasut'inuxw Haxwa'mis First Nation, as Kyimla Indian Reserve No. 11.

== See also ==
- List of Kwakwaka'wakw villages
