= Scott Cove =

Cove in British Columbia, Canada

Coordinates: 50°46′00″N 126°27′30″W

Scott Cove is a locality on the west side of Gilford Island in the Queen Charlotte Strait region of the Central Coast of British Columbia, Canada, located at the cove of the same name.

== See also ==
- List of settlements in British Columbia
