= Viscount Island =

Island in British Columbia, Canada

Viscount Island is an island in the Central Coast region of British Columbia, situated on the east side of the southern entrance to Tribune Channel from lower Knight Inlet, to the southeast of Gilford Island. A narrow waterway, Sergeaunt Passage, separates it from the mainland to its east.

Bamber Point is a headland on the middle of the island's west side at 50°41′43″N 126°14′02″W.

== See also ==
- List of islands of British Columbia
- Viscount (disambiguation)
