= Broughton Archipelago =

Archipelago in British Columbia, Canada

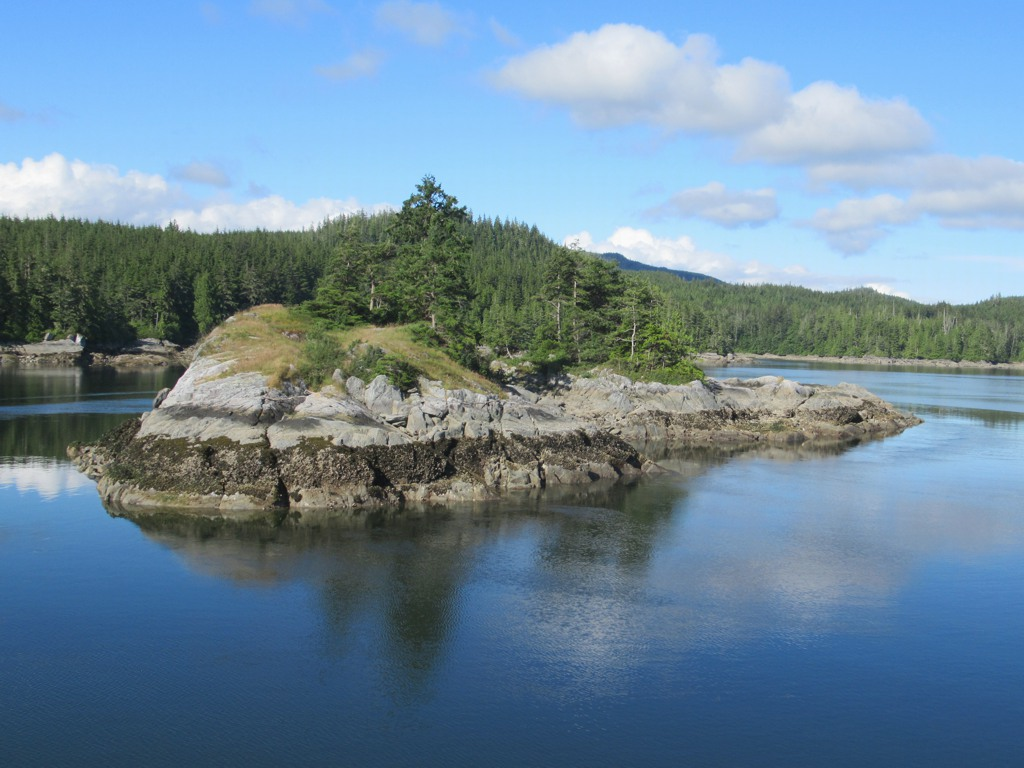
- Forested islet in Beware Passage

- Location within British Columbia Location within Canada

Geography
- Location: Queen Charlotte Strait
- Coordinates: 50°40′N 126°30′W

Administration
- Canada
- Province: British Columbia
- Regional District: Mount Waddington

Broughton Archipelago is a group of islands located at the eastern end of Queen Charlotte Strait in Mount Waddington Regional District, British Columbia. The archipelago is the traditional territory of the Musgamagw Dzawada'enuxw, Namgis, Ma'amtagila and Tlowitsis nations of the Kwakwaka'wakw peoples.

== Etymology ==
Broughton Archipelago was named in 1792 by George Vancouver in honour of William Robert Broughton, the captain of the expedition's second ship, HMS Chatham.

== Geography ==
The Broughton Archipelago includes numerous islands and islets scattered throughout the eastern end of Queen Charlotte Strait. The largest island of the archipelago is Gilford Island with a total area of 384 km^{2} (148 mi^{2}). Cormorant Island is the most densely populated island with 270 residents/km^{2} (710 residents/mi^{2}) as of 2016.

The major islands of the Broughton Archipelago are as follows:

- Baker Island
- Bonwick Island
- Broughton Island
- Cormorant Island
- Crease Island
- East Cracroft Island
- Eden Island
- Gilford Island
- Hanson Island
- Harbledown Island
- Malcolm Island
- Midsummer Island
- Minstrel Island
- North Broughton Island
- Swanson Island
- Turnour Island
- Village Island
- Viscount Island
- Watson Island
- West Cracroft Island

=== Major waterways ===
Major waterways include Beware Passage, Broughton Strait, Clio Channel, Fife Sound, Johnstone Strait, Kingcome Inlet, Knight Inlet, Retreat Passage, Tribune Channel, and Wells Passage.

== Conservation ==
The archipelago is rich in biodiversity and culturally significant sites. Protected areas include Broughton Archipelago Conservancy, Broughton Archipelago Provincial Park, Burdwood Group Conservancy, Cormorant Channel Marine Provincial Park, Echo Bay Marine Provincial Park, and Qwiquallaaq/Boat Bay Conservancy.

== See also ==
- Discovery Islands
