= Crease Island =

Island in British Columbia, Canada

Coordinates: 50°37′07″N 126°39′25″W

Crease Island, formerly Lewis Island, is an island in the Broughton Archipelago Marine Provincial Park in the Queen Charlotte Strait-Johnstone Strait region of the Central Coast of British Columbia, Canada. It is located north of Harbledown Island and is at the southern extremity of the provincial park.

== Name origin ==
The name Lewis Island was changed to Crease Island in 1905 to commemorate Sir Henry Pering Pellew Crease, (1823-1905). He emigrated to the Crown Colony of Vancouver Island in 1858 and served as Attorney-General for ten years (1861-1971) before being appointed to the Supreme Court of British Columbia, retiring after 25 years, in 1895, with a knighthood. He died February 27, 1905.
