= Broughton Archipelago Provincial Park =

Provincial park in British Columbia, Canada

- IUCN category II (national park)
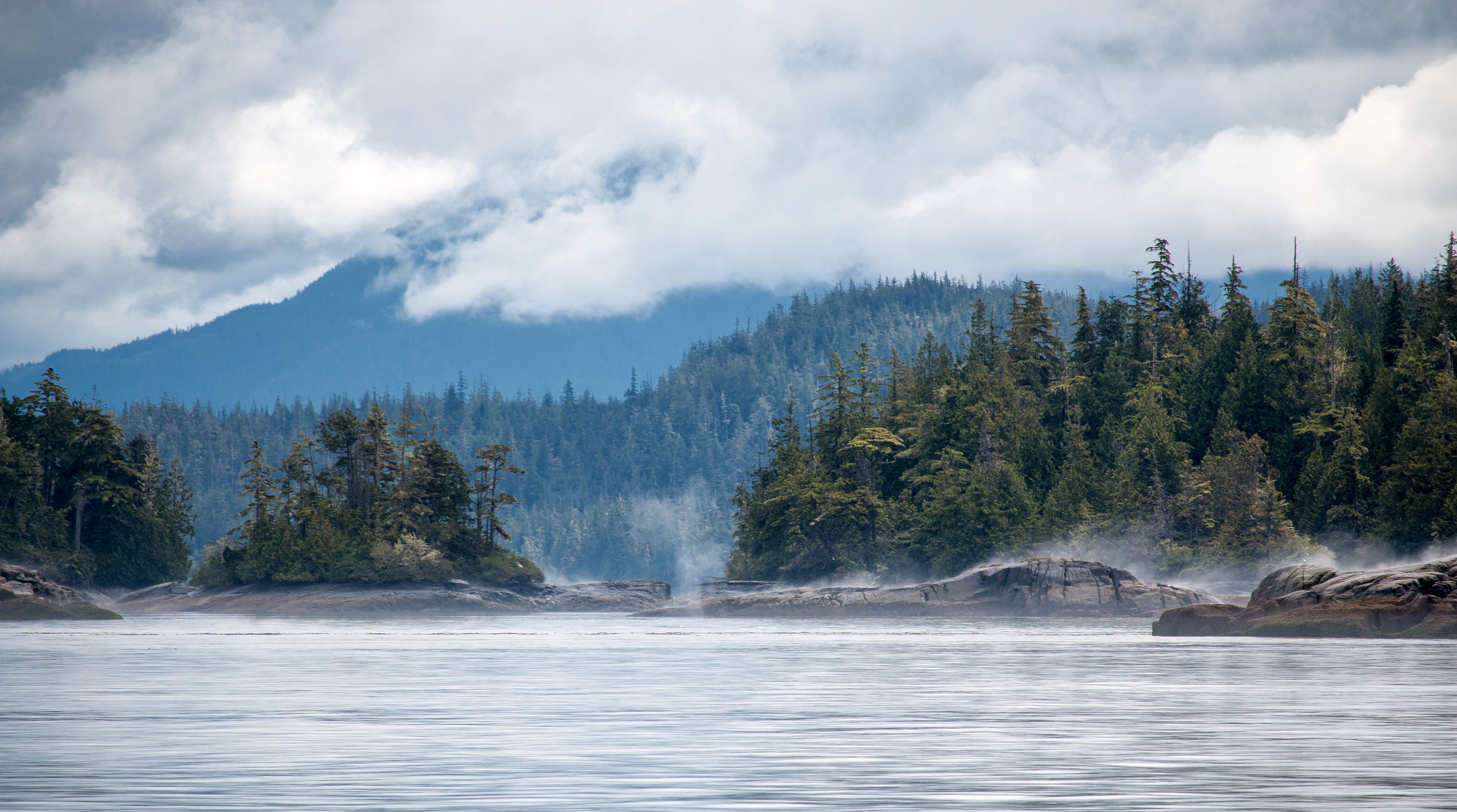
- Morning steam rising off the Fog Islets of Broughton Archipelago Provincial Park

- Location within Vancouver Island Location within British Columbia Location within Canada
- Interactive map of Broughton Archipelago Provincial Park
- Coordinates: 50°40′59″N 126°41′05″W
- Operator: BC Parks
- Website: Broughton Archipelago Provincial Park

Broughton Archipelago Provincial Park is the largest marine provincial park located in British Columbia, Canada. The park is located in the Queen Charlotte Strait around 30 kilometres (19 mi) east of Port McNeill, a town situated on Vancouver Island. In terms of its functions, the park offers tourism opportunities such as kayaking and whale watching, preserves a wide array of wildlife including many at-risk species, and has a long history of use by First Nation peoples.

== Geography ==
Broughton Archipelago Park is located near the south-eastern end of the Queen Charlotte Strait and the mouth of Knight Inlet. The Park's boundary is defined by the archipelago on which it is situated, encompassing the majority of the smaller islands in said archipelago. In spite of this, the boundary deviates around Crease, Midsummer and Swanson island and covers only portions of Berry and Baker Island, making the majority of the park's area situated among small islands and the ocean.

== Ecology ==
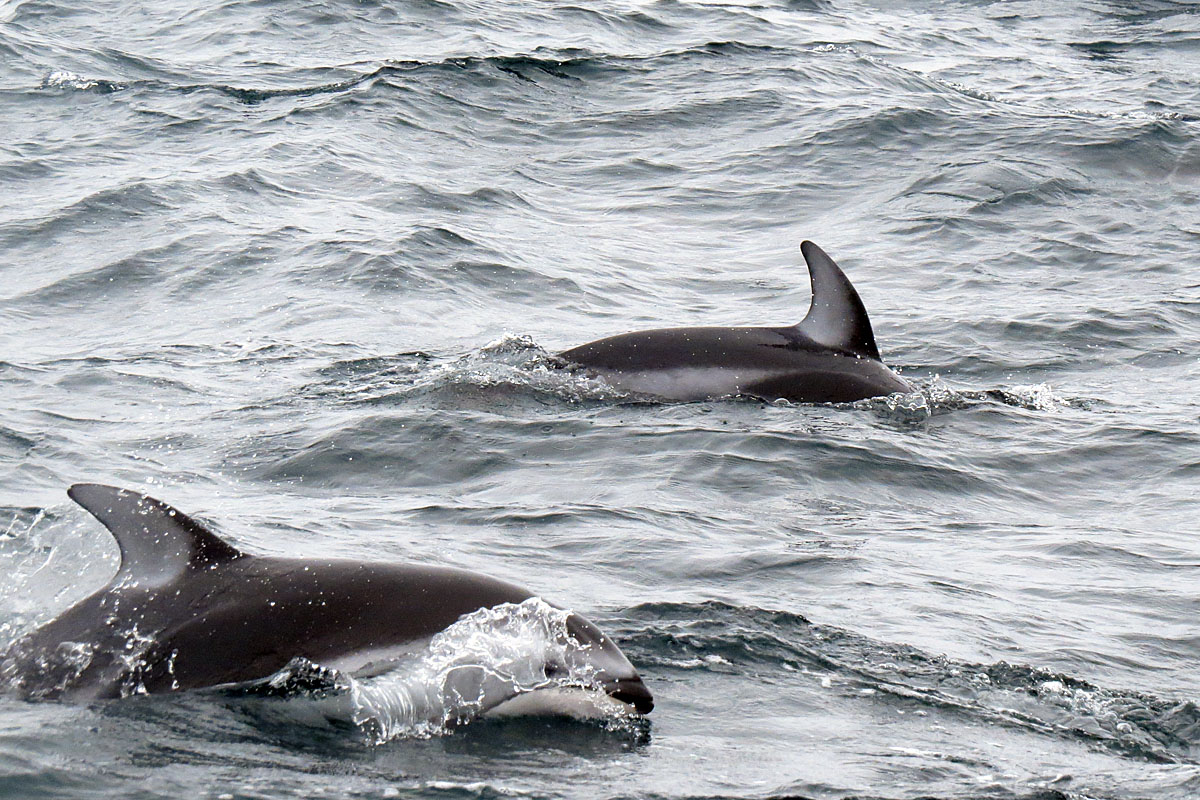
Pacific white sided dolphins (see above) are among the marine mammal species found in Broughton Archipelago Marine Provincial Park.

The park contains many different examples of flora and fauna endemic across much of the Pacific Northwest. Examples of the marine life that inhabit the waters of the park include cutthroat trout and salmon varieties such as pink, chinook, or coho. Likewise, the park is home to many examples of marine mammals including harbor seals, sea lions, porpoises, dolphins and a variety of whale species. Additionally, the islands are home to both clam gardens that are dotted around intertidal areas as well as a historically sporadic community of pacific white-sided dolphins.

Aside from the mainly marine animals, a few of the many terrestrial animals that inhabit the area are as follows: black bears, grizzly bears, mink, and raccoons. In terms of flora, the forests across the islands contain 63% of British Columbia's protected examples of Outer Fiordland Ecosection Coastal Western Hemlock.

=== Species at risk ===
There are many species that inhabit the park, including many that are categorized as being under some level threat. Species at risk whose range includes areas of the marine park are the northern abalone, marbled murrelet, killer whale, and sea otter. In terms of how these species are faring, two of the populations of killer whale that inhabit the area have been growing in recent years. The northern resident population has experienced growth from 1973 to 2021 except for small fluctuations between 1990 and 2003. The second population of killer whales, the west coast transient stock, experienced rapid growth during the 1970s to 1990s, where population growth slowed down but stayed positive. Northern abalone, which live within the boundaries of the park, have faced a large decline in their population since the 1970s and the latest report on their numbers indicated no significant recovery in abalone populations. Conservation of these species and the ecosystem as a whole is one of the primary purposes of the park.

== History ==
Prior to European colonization, the First Nations had a village situation along Charles Creek. The village was strategically located on the water to take advantage of the annual salmon run; however, a landslide destroyed the village. In 1906, a cannery was built on the old site, which was subsequently destroyed by another landslide in 1933. Due to the growing demand for salmon, the archipelago was used for aquaculture starting in 1987.

On September 16, 1992, Broughton Archipelago Marine Park was created by Order in Council No.1489 by converting crown land into a Class A Provincial Park. The park was created under the auspices of both the BC Land Act and the BC Park Act by the government of BC Premier Mike Harcourt.

Broughton Archipelago Provincial Park was established for three purposes: protecting the ecosystem, providing a recreational area, and preserving the cultural heritage of the area. The primary purpose of the creation of the park was to protect the natural ecosystem because it represents large portions of three ecosections of the British Columbia coast and is home to several uncommon species. The second goal for the park was to create a recreational area that can be used for a variety of water-based recreational activities such as kayaking, diving, and fishing. The third purpose of the park was to protect the history of the region, particularly the cultural heritage of the Kwakiutl First Nation.

== Indigenous presence ==
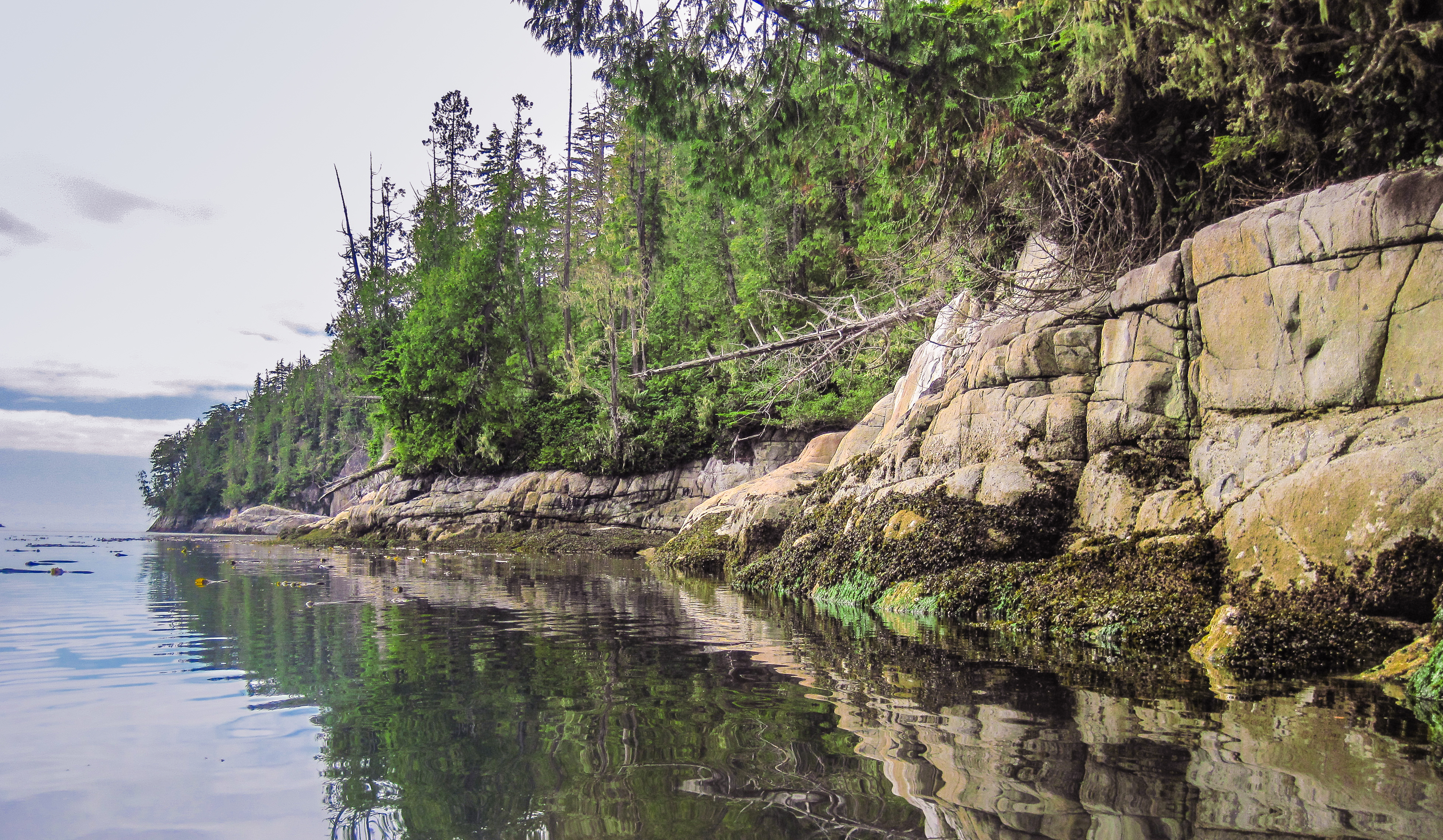
The shores of Eden Island, in the Broughton Archipelago marine park

Broughton Archipelago Provincial Park (established in 1992) was one of many provincial parks established by B.C.'s Protected Areas Strategy. The archipelago is situated on the ancestral territories of the Kwakwa̱ka̱ʼwakw people of the Northwest coast. What was once one large group, the Kwakwa̱ka̱ʼwakw Nation has been subject to separation through time. These separate groups ranged throughout the archipelago and thrived off its ecosystems. However, the arrival of European settlers and disease to the West Coast caused the dispossession and abandonment of sacred Kwakwa̱ka̱ʼwakw territory, and forced movement and increased interactions between groups. Today, the Dzawada'enuxw, Gwawaenuk, Kwikwasut'inuxw Haxwa'mis, Mamalilikulla, and ‘Na̲mg̲is nations are among those who remain.

These groups, who have stewarded the Broughton Archipelago since time immemorial, coexisted with the many other species of animals who also called this area home. Among the species that inhabited the region, there are arguably none more important than the five species of Pacific salmon. For the Kwakwa̱ka̱ʼwakw people, salmon were not just a food source, but also an integral part of their culture. Although, with the arrival of early settlers came resource extraction, and Pacific salmon were unfortunately a major victim. Fish farms (commercial breeding) in the Broughton archipelago devastated local stocks through various changes to the environment, such as diseases like sea lice (see below) and intensified competition between species.

A change was needed, so the Dzawada'enuxw, Gwawaenuk, Kwikwasut'inuxw Haxwa'mis, Mamalilikulla, and ‘Na̲mg̲is nations came together to form what is known as the Musgamagw Tsawataineuk Tribal Council (MTTC). The MTTC has, and continues to play a large role in ensuring a collaborative approach to resource management decisions in the region, both on land and in the water. Media platforms like Facebook and magazines like The Tyee have also been significant for informing the public about these issues and ensuring that concerns are recognized and dealt with. In 2018, a breakthrough document—a letter of understanding (LOU) between the BC government and the MTTC was finally realized. This letter set the foundation for a consent-based approach for all future decisions relating to the archipelago's ecosystems.

To this day, these actions have seen great effect towards conservation efforts, even going as far as having the BC government agree to phase out all fish farms rejected by the council.

== Human impacts ==
=== Aquaculture ===
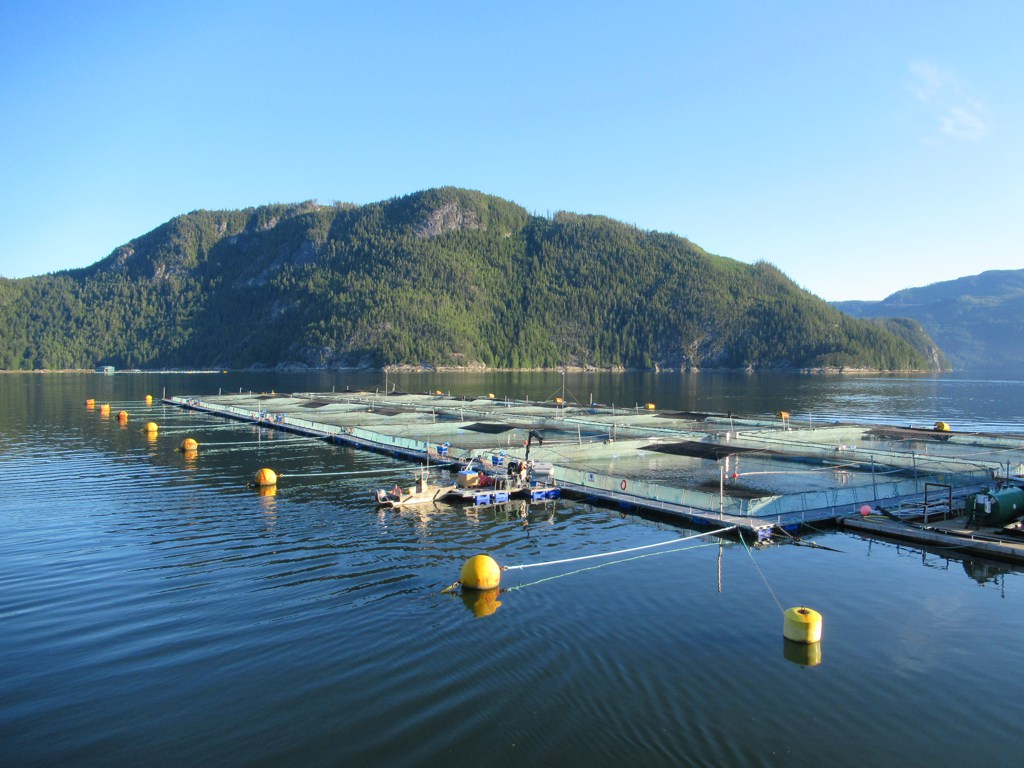
Grieg Seafood fish farm in Broughton Archipelago

In the archipelago lie several salmon farms. The first salmon farm was introduced into Broughton Archipelago in 1987 and production steadily rose to 17 Gg (gigagrams) by 1999. However, due to the nature of open-net pen salmon aquaculture, the tight space became a breeding ground for sea lice.

Sea lice are common in both wild and farmed adult salmon populations, they feed on the host surface tissue leading to mortality in high infection rates. After a collapse of pink salmon fish stocks in 2000 and 2001, scientists investigated juvenile pink salmon and found that over 90% were infested with sea lice caused by the fish farms. Pink salmon are not like other species in that they do not rear in freshwater for the developing stages of their life. Instead, once hatched, they go straight out to sea and develop for the first few months in intertidal zones. At this stage, salmonids are particularly vulnerable to infestation as it is correlated to reduced survival.

=== Climate change ===
Warmer water temperatures are associated with higher infection of parasites and pathogens. In the 1970s, fish farms were located on the Sunshine Coast, but due to warming water temperatures, there were severe losses in product caused by algal blooms and disease. So these farms migrated to cooler waters up north and settled in Broughton Archipelago. Outbreaks in parasites are found to be more severe in warmer temperatures, and temperature increases are expected to increase the frequency of outbreaks. Due to warming temperatures, parasites and pathogens are expected to shift their geographic distribution.

=== Noise pollution ===
Pinnipeds and cetaceans are common inhabitants of Broughton Archipelago. Both use echolocation to communicate, hunt, and orientate themselves in the water. Many aquaculture farms have implemented acoustic harassment devices to deter predators. Originally designed to deter seals from fish farms, other species with similar hearing thresholds can also be affected by the noise. The first acoustic harassment device was implemented at the beginning of 1993 and then more were subsequently implemented. The high-powered acoustic harassment devices were designed to cause physical pain to marine mammals. They have been implemented on marine fishing gear, aquaculture, and disturbed estuarine habitats. While this deters marine mammals from fish farms, it also causes long-term displacement.

== Tourism ==
Broughton Archipelago has become a destination spot for many activities. Due to the geography of the archipelago with its dozens of islands, inlets, and channels, kayaking and canoeing are some of the most popular activities. In addition, recreational fishing is also a common activity due to the amount of pink salmon that spawn there every year. Visitors can also experience whale watching in the area. The southern resident killer whales live in the area year-round and humpback whales return to the area in the summer. There are also camping opportunities. While there are no formal campsites, kayakers use some areas year round. For those visitors more inclined to educational opportunities, there is cultural tourism to learn from the First Nation communities.
