= Kwikwasutʼinuxw =

The Kwikwasut'inuxw are one of the many subgroups of the Kwakwaka'wakw peoples of the Central Coast of British Columbia, Canada. Their ancestral home is at Gwayasdums on Village Island, which was destroyed by the Nuxalk in 1856.

The Kwikwasut'inuxw, historically spelled Kwicksutaineuk or Kwiksootainuk and other variants, are part of two-present-day band governments, the Kwikwasut'inuxw Haxwa'mis First Nation and the Mamalilikulla-Qwe'Qwa'Sot'Em Band. Descendants of the survivors of the destruction of Gwayasdums who found refuge with the Mamalilikulla at Memkumlis self-identify today as the Qwe'Qwa'Sot'Enox.
