= Watson Island (British Columbia) =

Island in British Columbia, Canada

Coordinates: 50°55′58″N 126°49′29″W

Watson Island is an island in the Queen Charlotte Strait region of the Central Coast of British Columbia, Canada, located to the north of North Broughton Island in the entrance to Mackenzie Sound. It is named for Alexander Watson, colonial treasurer of Vancouver Island in 1866 and later an official with the original Bank of British Columbia.

== See also ==
- List of islands of British Columbia
- Watson Island (disambiguation)
