= Broughton Island (British Columbia) =

Island in British Columbia, Canada

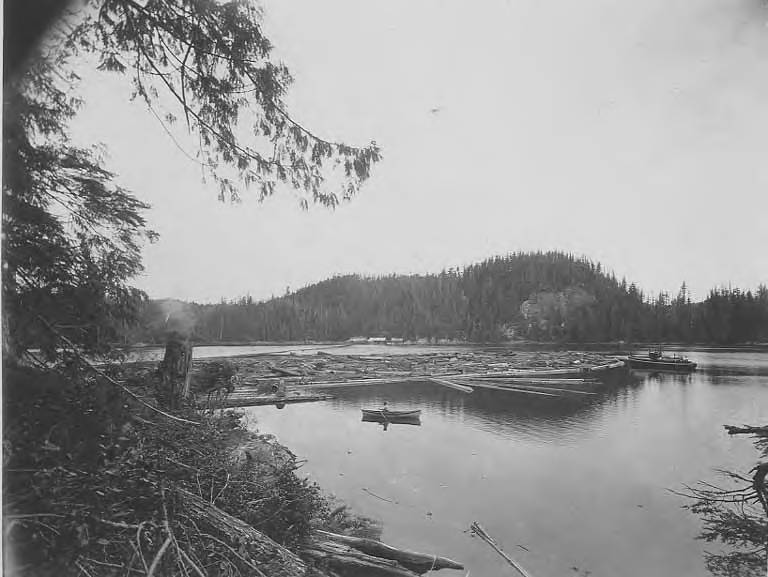
Broughton Island in 1917

Broughton Island is an island in the Broughton Archipelago of the Queen Charlotte Strait area of the Central Coast of British Columbia, northwest of Gilford Island.

Broughton Lagoon is a shallow inlet on its north side, at 50°50′02″N 126°41′40″W

To the north is North Broughton Island.

== Name origin ==
Broughton Island and the Broughton Archipelago, and Broughton Strait nearby, were all named in 1792 by Captain George Vancouver, for Commander William Robert Broughton, captain of HMS Chatham during his first tenure in British Columbia, and thereafter upon his return to the British Columbia Coast, of HMS Providence. HMS Discovery, Vancouver's ship, and HMS Chatham under Broughton were anchored off the south shore of this island on July 28, 1792.

== See also ==
- Broughton (disambiguation)
- Broughton Island (disambiguation)
