= Western Chain (New Zealand) =

Chain of islets south of New Zealand

Tahi, Rua, Toru, Whā, Rima (Māori)
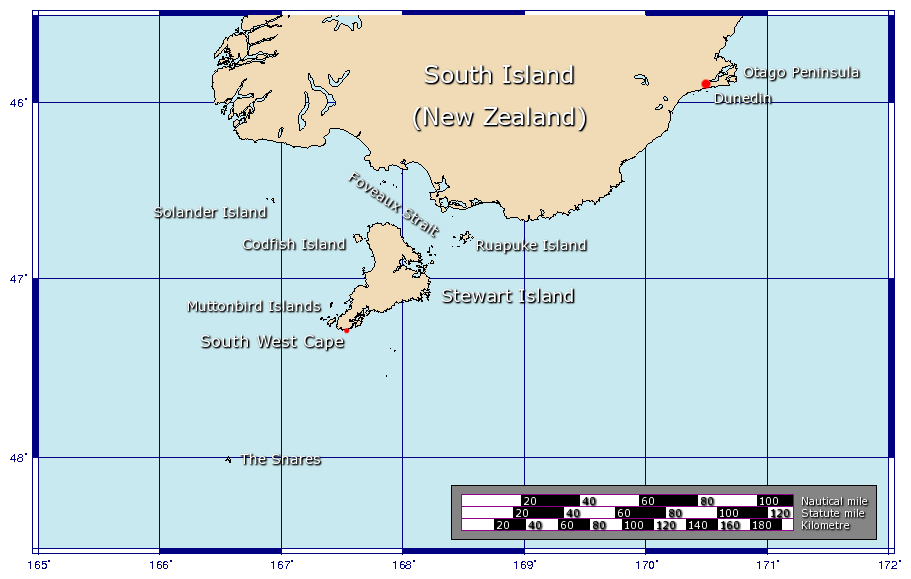
- The position of The Snares relative to New Zealand

Geography
- Coordinates: 48°03′0″S 166°30′30″E
- Archipelago: The Snares
- Length: 1.2 km (0.75 mi)
- Highest elevation: 44 m (144 ft)

Administration
- New Zealand

Demographics
- Population: 0

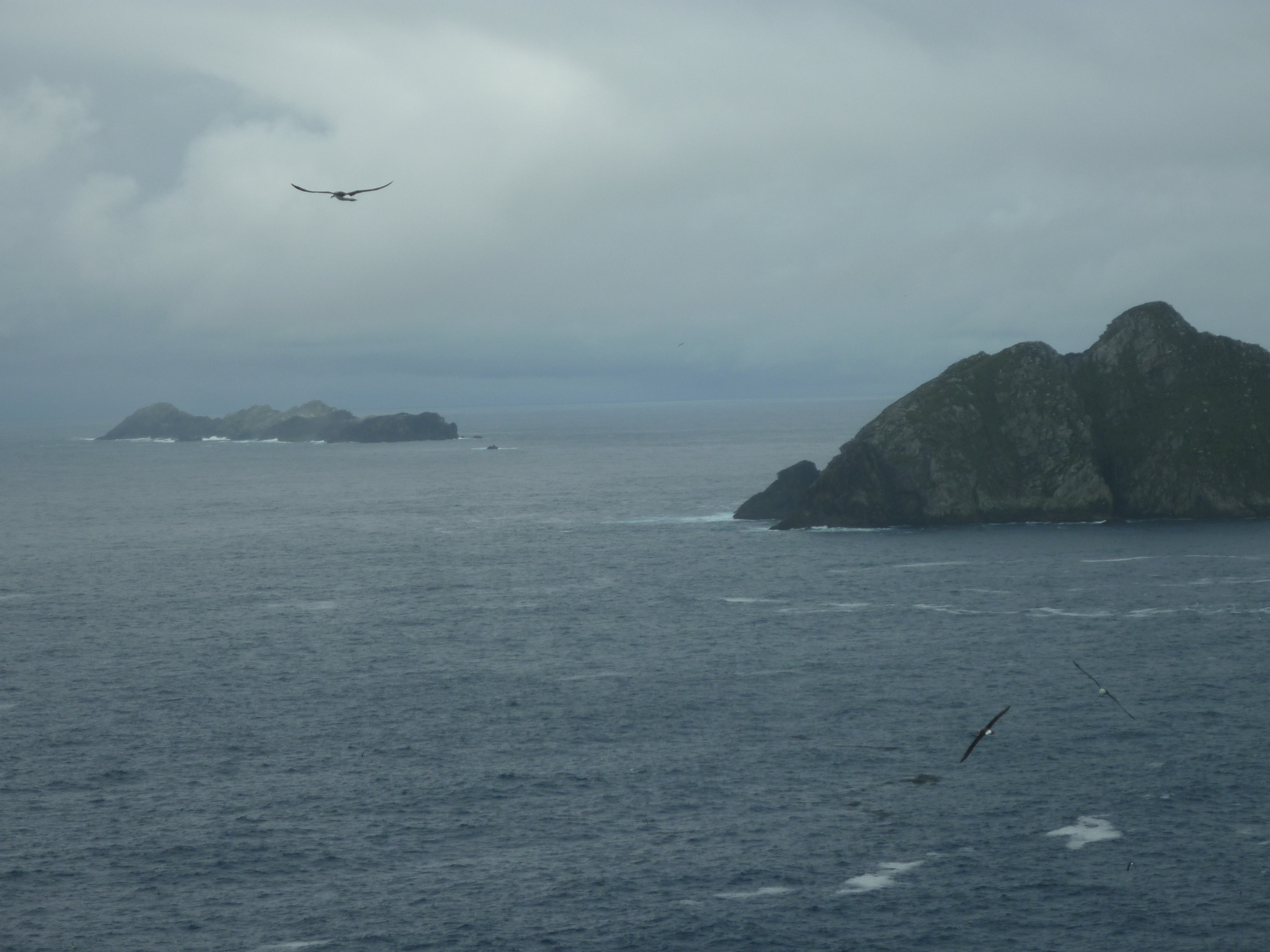
Western Chain (LHS) & Alert Stack (RHS)

The Western Chain is a group of islets at 48°03′0″S 166°30′30″E and a part of The Snares. They lie some 5 km (3.1 mi) to the WSW off the main island North East Island, which lies approx. 200 kilometres (120 mi) south of New Zealand's South Island. The Western Chain island is some 2 km (1.2 mi) long in NW direction, and the highest elevation of 44 m (144 ft) is at the southernmost Island.

The islets all carry Māori names, from NE: Tahi (English: One), Rua (Two), Toru (Three), Whā (Four) and finally Rima (Five).

== See also ==
- New Zealand Subantarctic Islands
- List of Antarctic and subantarctic islands#List of subantarctic islands
- List of islands of New Zealand
- List of islands
- Desert island
