= Thompson Sound (British Columbia) =

Sound in British Columbia

Thompson Sound is a sound on the Central Coast of British Columbia, Canada, located on the east side of Tribune Channel and to the east of Gilford Island, part of the Broughton Archipelago. The headland on the north side of the sound's entrance is London Point at 50°46′09″N 126°07′07″W. The south side of the entrance is demarcated by Cleave Point at 50°44′35″N 126°07′28″W.

Located on the sound is the unincorporated locality of Thompson Sound at 50°48′00″N 126°01′00″W, and Kakweken Indian Reserve No. 4, at the mouth of the Kakweiken River at the head of the sound, 4.0 ha. in size, at 50°48′00″N 126°02′00″W. A village site of the Kwikwasut'inuxw, said to be their place of origin, is also at the head of the sound is wato, also spelled watu, at 50°48′00″N 126°00′30″W.

Kwak'wala placenames on the sound are leqwe, meaning "camping ground", just east of London Point at 50°46′40″N 126°06′40″W and gidelbe, meaning "long point", located across the sound on its south side at 50°46′25″N 126°04′00″W

There is one small island in the sound, near its head, Sackville Island at 50°47′29″N 126°01′24″W.

== See also ==
- List of Kwakwaka'wakw villages
- List of Indian reserves in British Columbia
