= Bonwick Island =

Island of British Columbia, Canada

Bonwick Island is an island in the Broughton Archipelago in Central Coast region of the Canadian province of British Columbia. The archipelago is on the northeast side of Queen Charlotte Strait and lies northwest of the village of Alert Bay and immediately to the west of Gilford Island, separated from it by Retreat Pass. Arrow Passage is to its northwest, separating it from Mars Island.

== Features ==
On the island's northeast side is Waddington Bay (50°43′02″N 126°36′55″W), named after entrepreneur Alfred Waddington whose ill-fated attempt to build a wagon road from Bute Inlet to the Cariboo became the flashpoint of the Chilcotin War of 1864. Waddington Harbour at the head of Bute Inlet is also named for him.

South of Waddington Bay is Grebe Cove (50°42′36″N 126°37′20″W), and south of that is Carrie Bay (50°41′33″N 126°37′43″W).

On the island's northwest side is Betty Cove (50°42′16″N 126°39′51″W), and to the south of it is Dusky Cove (50°41′35″N 126°39′44″W).

== Name origin ==
Bonwick Island was named by Captain Pender after Charles Bonwick, acting assistant engineer above the gunboat HMS Grappler in 1860, then as acting chief engineer on the survey ship Beaver from 1863. He retired and was living in England by 1906. The Bonwick Islands, now the Augustine Islands, Bonwick Point and Mount Bonwick were also named for him.

== See also ==
- List of islands of British Columbia
