= Viscount (disambiguation) =

Viscount is a type of European nobility.

Viscount may also refer to:

- Viscount (musical instrument manufacturer), an Italian company
- Vickers Viscount, a turboprop airliner
- Viscount (biscuit)
- Rural Municipality of Viscount No. 341, Saskatchewan, Canada
  - Viscount, Saskatchewan, a village within the rural municipality
- Viscount Island, on the Central Coast of British Columbia
- HMS Viscount (D92), a British destroyer in commission in the Royal Navy from 1918 to 1945
- Viscount (cigarette brand)
- Dodge Viscount, an automobile produced in 1959 by Chrysler of Canada

== See also ==
- The Viscounts (disambiguation)
- Viscountcy of Béarn
