= Broughton, east North Yorkshire =

Village and civil parish in North Yorkshire, England

Coordinates: 54.149°N 0.825°W

Broughton
- Location within North Yorkshire
- OS grid reference: SE768732
- Civil parish: Broughton
- Unitary authority: North Yorkshire
- Ceremonial county: North Yorkshire
- Region: Yorkshire and the Humber
- Country: England
- Sovereign state: United Kingdom
- Post town: MALTON
- Postcode district: YO17
- Police: North Yorkshire
- Fire: North Yorkshire
- Ambulance: Yorkshire
- UK Parliament: Thirsk and Malton

Broughton is a village and civil parish in North Yorkshire, England. Broughton is situated 1.5 miles (2.4 km) north-west of Malton. According to the 2011 census the parish had a population of 212, a reduction from the 2001 census when it stood at 233.

It was part of the Ryedale district between 1974 and 2023. It is now administered by North Yorkshire Council.

The name Broughton derives from the Old English brōctūn meaning 'settlement by a brook'.

Broughton has a long history of being a farming and working village having a close knit community. The village started out as a small hamlet with about 10 to 15 houses . There was no real developments early on as Manor Farm and the Manor House on Beechcroft lane were the main parts of the small settlement. Then shortly after world war 2, 2 housing estates were built, one on Beechcroft Lane called Beech Crescent consisting of about 15 semi detached properties, and another called Manor Park on the west of the village consisting of semi detached houses along with a few dormer bungalows. Things went quiet after that with a few houses being added beyond the village boundary on the main B1257 road at the top of Moor lane. From 1982 to 1984 3 houses were built in the southern part of the village. Fairview, fairview house (now park house ) and fair meadows. The 2 former were built on the site of a small pigsty on the left corner of Manor Park and the latter was built southern to that of 22 Manor Park. Things went quiet for the next 10 years before the additions of oak farm court and Dobsons yard consisting around the corner going onto Beechcroft lane. The only significant property changes to the present day is hazel house an old cottage 2 miles off beechcroft lane falling into disrepair and garden cottage and a few bungalows being built. The chapel was demolished in the 1970s and now the only remaining service in the village is a butcher who visits on a Saturday and a fishmonger on Tuesday . Broughton is still a lively village with locals all coming together to keep their village tidy. Most people commute to nearby Malton and York for work.

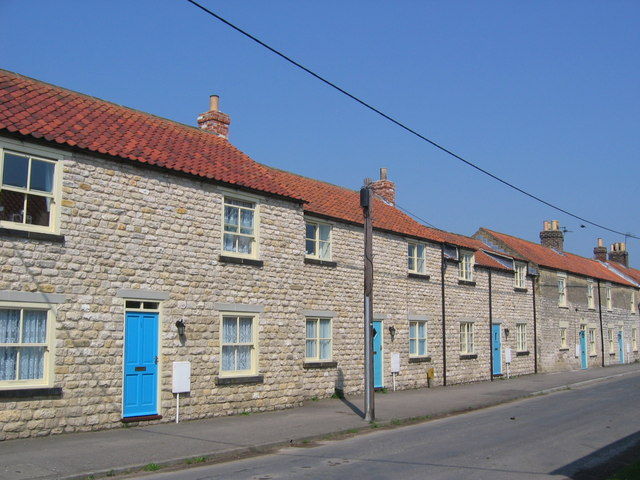
A terrace of houses in Broughton
