= Gwaʼyasdams =

Village of Kwakwaka'wakw people

Gwayasdums is a village of the Kwakwakaʼwakw peoples on the west side of Gilford Island in the Johnstone Strait region of the Central Coast of British Columbia, Canada. The village, located on Retreat Pass, is on Gwayasdums Indian Reserve No. 1. Other spellings of the name are Kwaustums and gwaʼyasdams and Gwaʼyasdams.

The locality has also been known as Health Bay, also the name for an adjoining body of water at 50°41′01″N 126°34′51″W which is a side bay. Health Lagoon is nearby Gwayasdums just to the south at 50°41′43″N 126°34′02″W.

== History ==
Gwayasdums, which today has about 70 residents, is the ancestral home of the Kwikwasut’inuxw, though it has been used by many other Kwakwaka'wakw groups over time. The village was destroyed by the Nuxalk in 1856, possibly in relation to a famine at Bella Coola resulting from the closing of Fort McLoughlin. The survivors joined the Mamalilikulla at Memkumlis on Village Island. The Gwawa’enuxw, the Haxwa’mis, and the Dzawada’enuxw began to use Gwayasdums as a joint winter village Between 1865 and 1879. In the 1890s the Kwikwasut'inuxw began to return though joint occupation and use continued into the 20th Century.

== See also ==
- List of Kwakwaka'wakw villages
