= Eliot Passage =

Marine waterway in Canada

Coordinates: 50°37′25″N 126°35′09″W

Eliot Passage is a marine waterway between Village Island (E) and Pearl Island (W) in the Johnstone Strait region of the Central Coast of British Columbia, Canada, southwest of the opening of Knight Inlet. The Kwakwaka'wakw village of Memkumlis, also known as Mamalillaculla after the name of the group of Kwakwaka'wakw whose principal village it is, is on its eastern shore on Village Island.

== Name origin ==
The passage was named in 1866 by Daniel Pender, then 2nd Lieutenant aboard HMS Cleo under Captain Turnour. Eliot served with the Royal Navy's Pacific Station from 1859 to 1862 and again in 1864 to 1868.
