= North Broughton Island =

Island in British Columbia, Canada

North Broughton Island (French: île North Broughton) is an island in the Broughton Archipelago, located as its name suggests to the north of Broughton Island in the Queen Charlotte Strait region of the Central Coast of British Columbia, Canada.

Broughton Point is on the south coast of the island, facing Broughton Island at 50°50′20″N 126°48′52″W

== See also ==
- Broughton (disambiguation)
- Broughton Island (disambiguation)
