= Snares Islands =

Island group in New Zealand

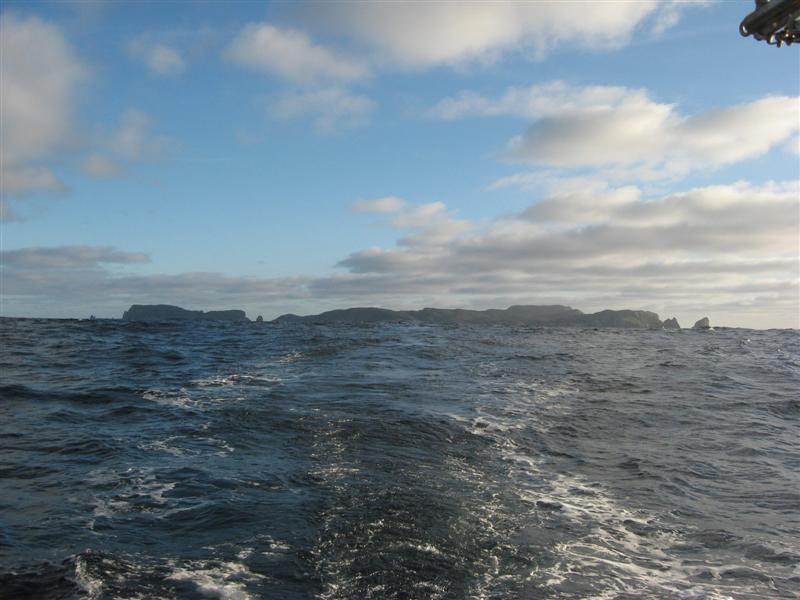
- The Snares Islands seen from the northeast, with Broughton Island on the left and Daption Rocks on the right

- Map of the Snares Islands

- Location of the Snares Islands in the Pacific Ocean

Geography
- Coordinates: 48°01′S 166°32′E
- Area: 3.4 km^{2} (1.3 sq mi)
- Highest elevation: 130 m (430 ft)

Administration
- New Zealand

Demographics
- Population: Uninhabited (2013)

The Snares Islands (Māori: Tini Heke; officially Snares Islands / Tini Heke), known colloquially as The Snares, is a group of uninhabited islands lying about 200 km (120 mi) south of New Zealand's South Island and to the south-southwest of Stewart Island / Rakiura. The Snares consist of the main North East Island and the smaller Broughton Island and Alert Stack, as well as the Western Chain Islands some 5 km (3.1 mi) to the west-southwest. Collectively, the Snares have a total land area of 3.4 km^{2} (1.3 sq mi).

The islands are listed with the New Zealand Outlying Islands. The islands are an immediate part of New Zealand, not part of any region or district, but instead Area Outside Territorial Authority, like all the other outlying islands except the Solander Islands.

== History ==
The islands were already known to the Māori, who called one of the larger islands Te Taniwha ("The sea-monster"). Archaeological traces of their visits have been found including a "basalt adze of early Maori type, has been recovered near the only secure landing place".

The island group was first sighted by Europeans on 23 November 1791 independently by the two ships HMS Discovery under Captain George Vancouver, and HMS Chatham, commanded by Lieutenant William R. Broughton, both of the Vancouver Expedition. Vancouver named the islands "The Snares" because he considered them a shipping hazard; an islet east of the Western Chain bears the name Vancouver Rock, and the second largest island is named after Broughton.

In contrast to Vancouver, Broughton proposed the name "Knight's Island". Unlike other subantarctic islands that were greatly affected by the whaling and sealing industry in the 19th century, the Snares remain one of the last pristine areas in New Zealand.

The Ngāi Tahu Claims Settlement Act 1998 officially altered the name to "Snares Islands/Tini Heke" – one of many such changes under the Ngāi Tahu Treaty settlement.

== Geography ==
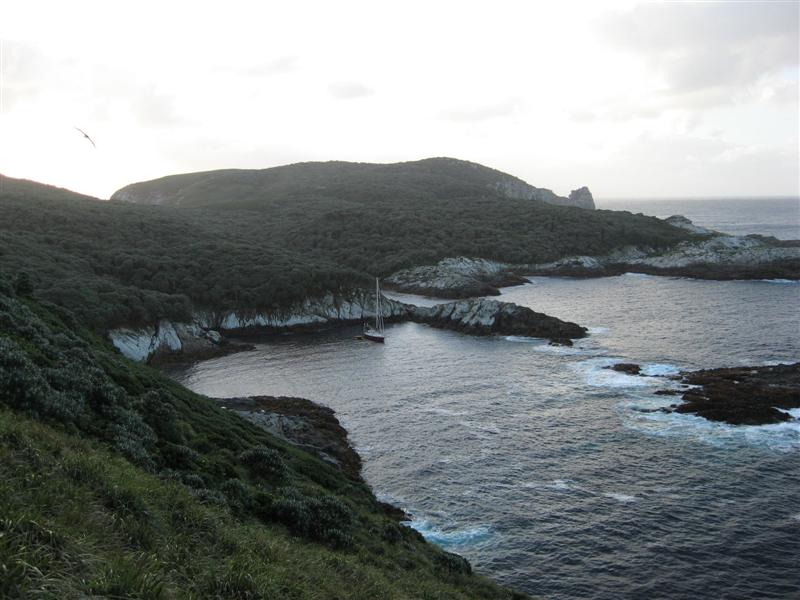
Ho Ho Bay — with Yacht Tiama anchored inside — a view looking north

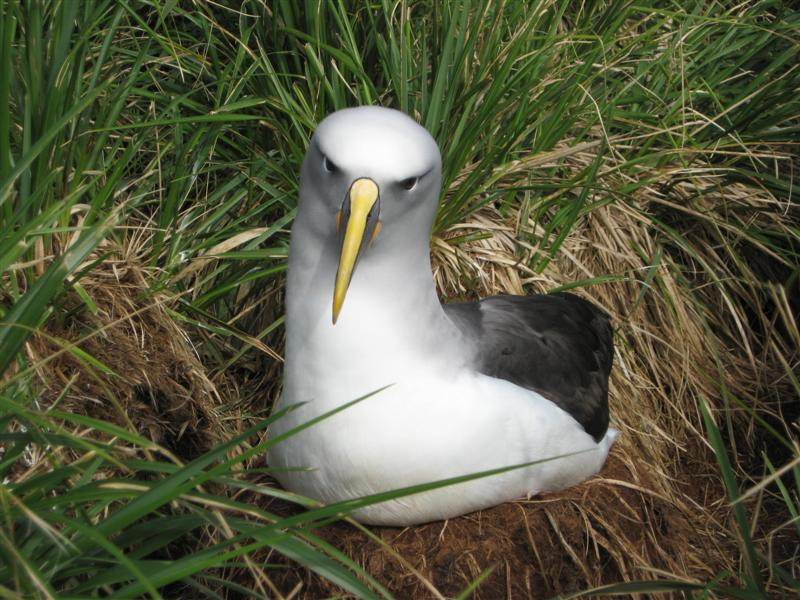
Southern Buller's albatross nesting above "Penguin Slope" — 6 April 2008

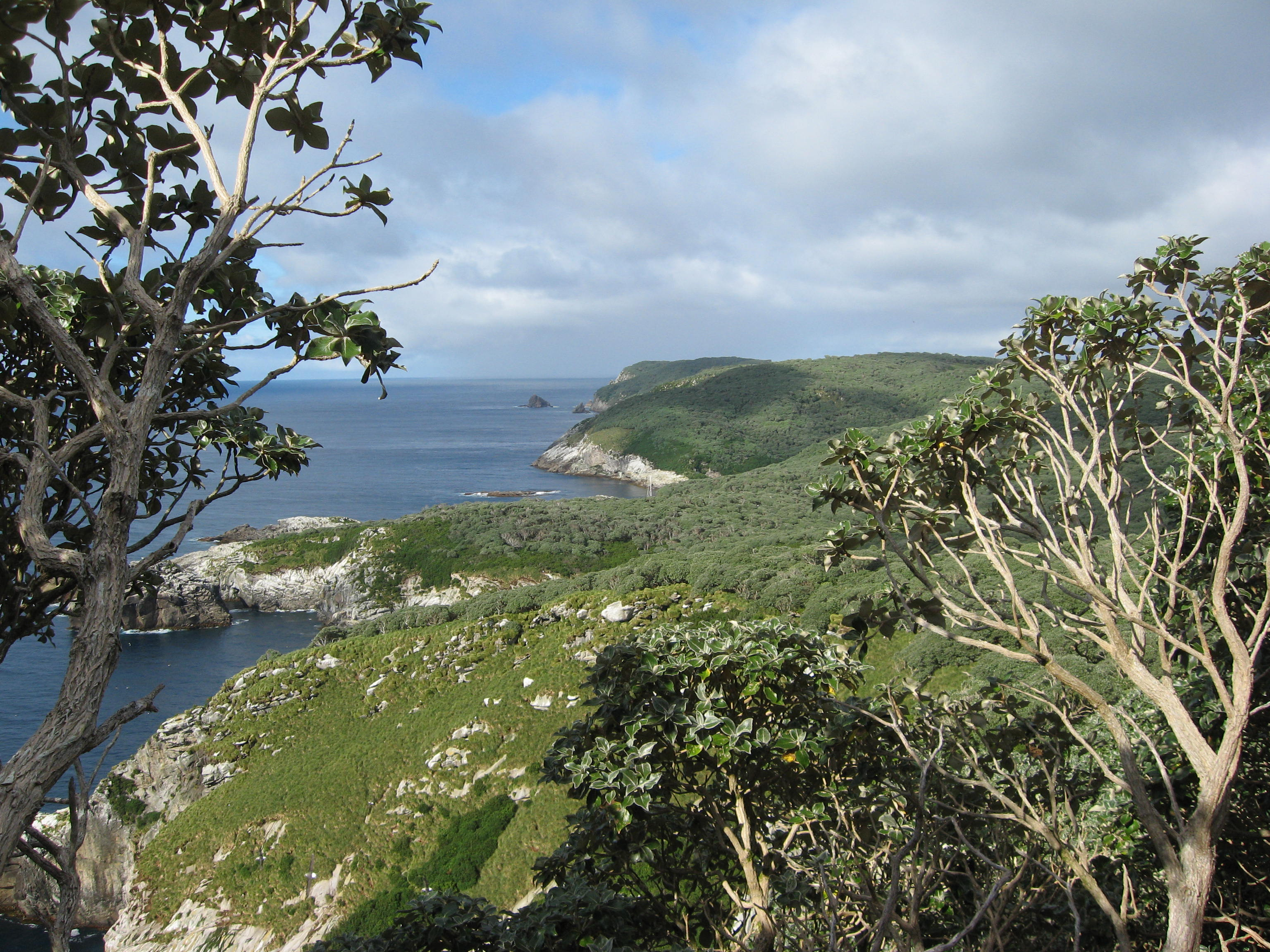
Looking south across Punui Bay, Ho Ho Bay and Mollymawk Bay, with Broughton Island the last wooded land.

The main island of the Snares group, North East Island, as its name suggests, lies at the northeastern corner of the group. It has roughly the shape of a triangle, but with two concave edges, this causing both the southern and northwestern coast to be in the form of large irregular bays. Cliffs and reefs are found along the northeastern coast and part of the southern coast, with the island's highest point – rising to 130 metres – being located on the long westward-pointing finger which lies between them.

In contrast, the east coast is relatively flat and sloping, and provides the only easy access-point for landing, close to Station Point. Several small bays dot the east coast, among them Punui Bay, Ho Ho Bay, and Mollymawk Bay. The island's northernmost and southernmost points are the prosaically named North Promontory and South Promontory. Several small islets, the Daption Rocks, lie off the tip of North Promontory, and are the island group's northernmost point.

The group's second largest island, Broughton Island, lies to the southeast of South Promontory. Steeply sloping, it is surrounded by cliffs, reefs and small islets on three sides, with only the northern side being relatively accessible.

The long finger on the western coast of the main island has several small islands located close to its tip. The largest of these, Alert Stack, is located to the south of the peninsula and separated from it by a narrow channel. The peninsula points almost directly towards the Western Chain, a line of stacks located some 4 kilometres to the southwest of the main island. These islets are simply named Tahi, Rua, Toru, Wha, and Rima, the Māori words for the numerals one to five. Between this chain and North East island lies the small stack of Vancouver Rock.

=== Islands ===
The following table includes named islands according to Land Information New Zealand.

Location	Area (ha)	Group
North East Island	290.4	
Broughton Island	41.5	
Alert Stack	9.0	
Daption Rocks	2.4	
Vancouver Rock	0.02	
Tahi	7.6	Western Chain
Toru	6.8	Western Chain
Rima	3.4	Western Chain
Rua	2.9	Western Chain
Wha	2.6	Western Chain
Western Chain	23.3	Western Chain
Total	366.6	

== Environment ==
All of the Snares islands and their surrounding waters have been recognised as Important Bird Areas (IBAs) by BirdLife International for their significant seabird breeding populations. The eastern islands are notable for their Snares penguins, Buller's albatrosses, sooty shearwaters, mottled petrels and common diving petrels, as well as of Snares snipe. The Western Chain hosts colonies of Snares penguins, Salvin's, Buller's and Chatham albatrosses. The islands also provide a home to the endemic Snares tomtit, as well as to several endemic invertebrates such as Grypotheca horningae.

North East Island is forested and is the world's premier breeding area for the sooty shearwaters, with up to three million individuals being present during the breeding season (November–April). A dangerous reef (Seal Reef) lies ten kilometres to the south of the group. Megaherb communities grow on the islands.

The islands enjoy a status of high protection and are rated by the New Zealand Department of Conservation as "minimum impact islands". Landing on the islands is generally prohibited or by special research permit only.

The area is among five subantarctic island groups forming the New Zealand Subantarctic Islands, designated as a World Heritage Site by UNESCO.

== See also ==
- List of Antarctic and subantarctic islands
- List of islands of New Zealand
- List of islands
- Desert island
