= Kakweiken River =

River in British Columbia

Coordinates: 50°48′24″N 126°01′27″W

The Kakweiken River, also spelled Kakweken River, is a river in the Central Coast region of British Columbia, Canada, flowing southwest out of the Pacific Ranges of the Coast Mountains into the head of Thompson Sound, which lies to the east of Gilford Island and to the north of lower Knight Inlet. Located at the mouth of the river is Kakweken Indian Reserve No. 4, which is under the administration of the Kwikwasut'inuxw Haxwa'mis First Nation.

== See also ==
- List of rivers of British Columbia
