= Broughton, Jamaica =

Village in Westmoreland, Jamaica

Broughton
- Village
- Location within Jamaica
- Coordinates: 18.2065°N 78.2106°W
- Country: Jamaica
- Parish: Westmoreland

Broughton (originally New Broughton) is situated on the south western coast of Westmoreland, Jamaica. Broughton is home to roughly 500 people. Most are fishermen, shop owners, and subsistence farmers, or work in nearby Negril and Savanna-la-Mar. Broughton has a primary school, and was one of the parts of Jamaica that were badly affected by Hurricane Melissa in 2025.
