= Broughton Island (New Zealand) =

Island of New Zealand

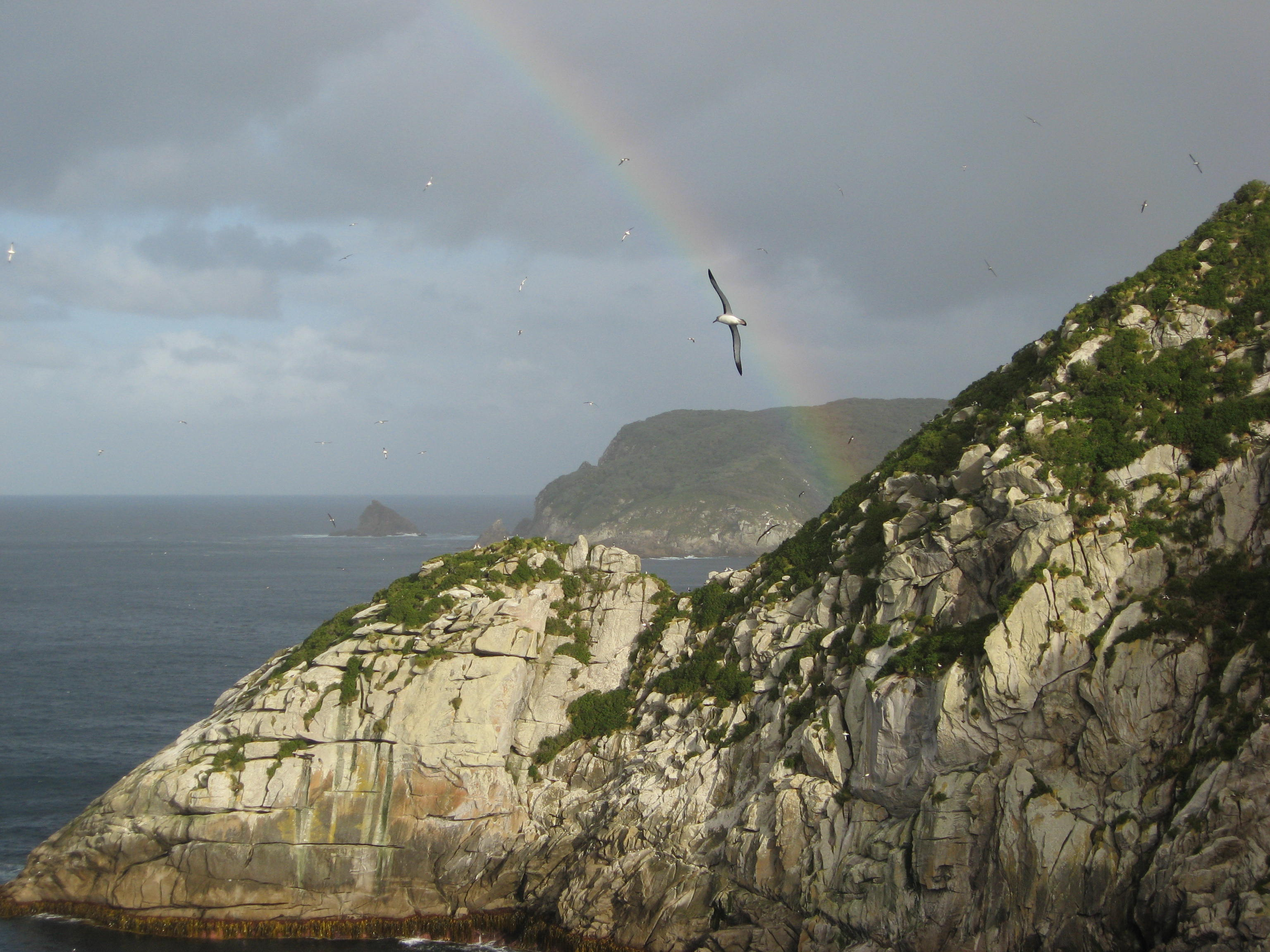

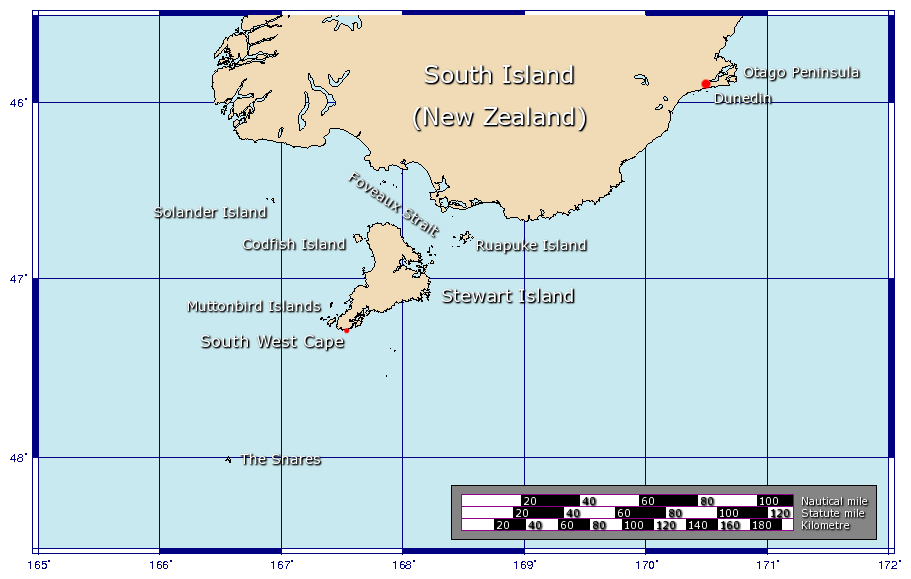
- The position of The Snares relative to New Zealand

Geography
- Coordinates: 48°02′35″S 166°37′15″E
- Archipelago: The Snares
- Length: 1 km (0.6 mi)
- Width: 0.5 km (0.31 mi)
- Highest elevation: 86 m (282 ft)

Administration
- New Zealand

Demographics
- Population: 0

Broughton Island is the second largest island of The Snares, at 48°02′35″S 166°37′15″E. It sits just off the South Promontory of the main island, North East Island, which itself lies approximately 200 kilometres (120 mi) south of New Zealand's South Island.

The island is some 1 by 0.5 km (0.62 by 0.31 mi) in size, with the main axis running northeast to southwest, and the highest elevation is 86 m (282 ft). The island is named after William Robert Broughton.

== See also ==
- New Zealand Subantarctic Islands
- List of Antarctic and subantarctic islands#List of subantarctic islands
- List of islands of New Zealand
- List of islands
- Desert island
