= Viner Sound =

Sound in British Columbia, Canada

Coordinates: 50°47′00″N 126°24′00″W

Viner Sound is a sound on the northwest side of Gilford Island and northeast of Baker Island in the Central Coast of British Columbia, Canada.
