= Retreat Passage =

Strait in British Columbia, Canada

Coordinates: 50°41′56″N 126°36′33″W

Retreat Passage is a short strait and marine waterway between Gilford Island (E) and Bonwick Island (W) in the Broughton Archipelago of the eastern Queen Charlotte Strait region of the Central Coast of British Columbia, Canada.
