= North East Island, New Zealand =

Largest island of the Snares Island group, New Zealand

North East Island
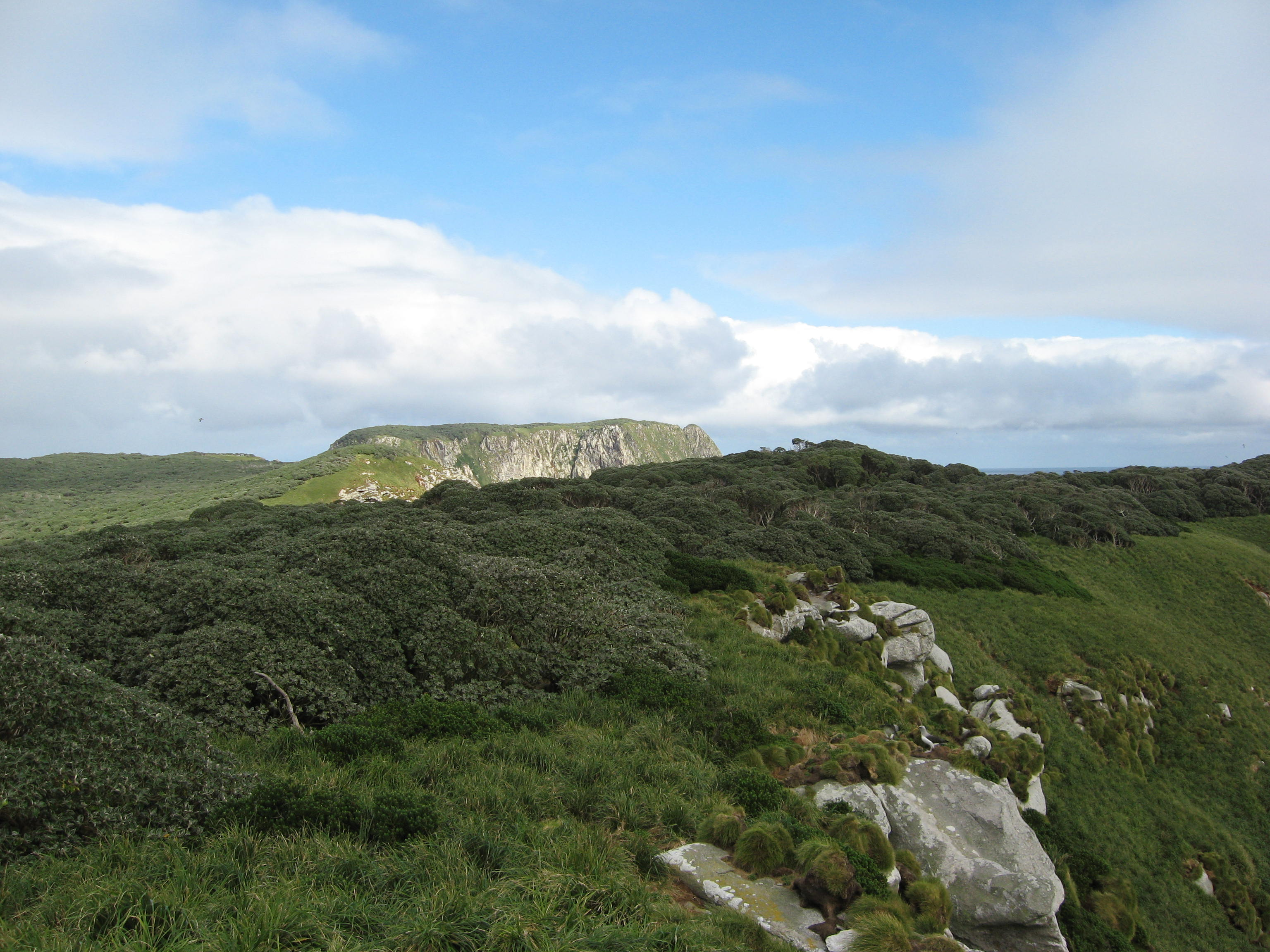
- Looking to the highest point in the West, across North East Island

- Map of the Snares Islands showing North East Island to the right

- Location of North East Island in the Pacific Ocean

Geography
- Coordinates: 48°01′30″S 166°36′10″E
- Archipelago: Snares Islands
- Length: 3 km (1.9 mi)
- Width: 2.5 km (1.55 mi)
- Highest elevation: 130.0 m (426.5 ft)

Administration
- New Zealand

Demographics
- Population: 0

North East Island is the main island of the Snares Islands / Tini Heke, located approximately 100 kilometres (62 mi) southwest of Stewart Island / Rakiura, the southernmost of New Zealand's main islands. The island forms a central triangle with peninsulas to the north, south and west and is some 3 by 2.5 km (1.9 by 1.6 mi) long by wide. Off the South Promontory lies Broughton Island, the second largest island in the group. Just off the southern coast of the western peninsula lies the islet Alert Stack, while off the North Promontory are the North and South Daption Rocks.

== See also ==
- New Zealand Subantarctic Islands
- List of Antarctic and subantarctic islands#List of subantarctic islands
- List of islands of New Zealand
- List of islands
- Desert island
