= William Robert Broughton =

British naval officer (1762–1821)

Captain William Robert Broughton
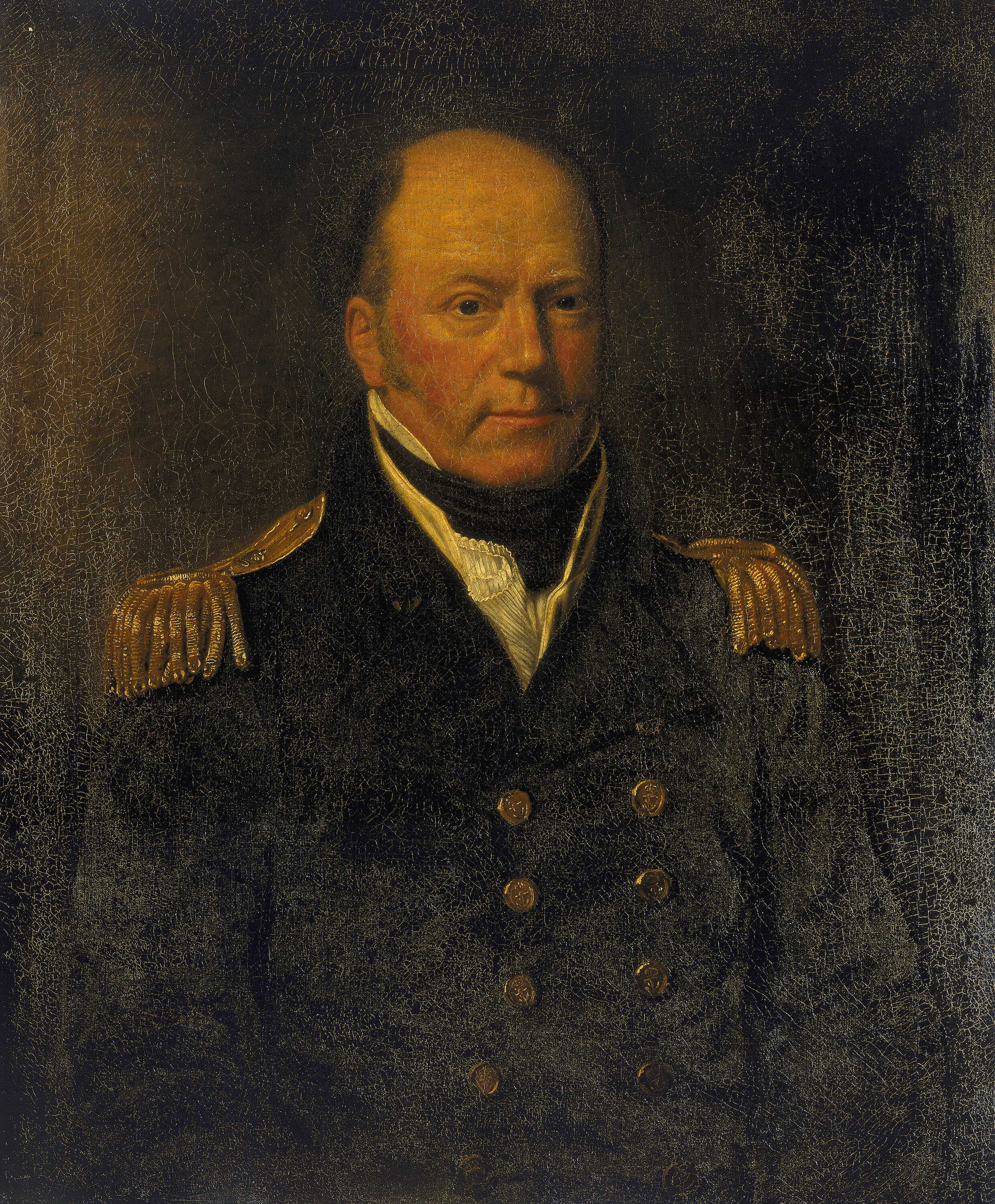
- Born: 22 March 1762; Gloucestershire, England
- Died: 14 March 1821 (aged 58); Florence, Tuscany
- Military career
- Allegiance: (Kingdom of Great Britain) Great Britain (United Kingdom of Great Britain and Ireland) United Kingdom
- Branch: Royal Navy
- Rank: Captain
- Commands: HMS Chatham; HMS Providence; HMS Penelope; HMS Illustrious
- Conflicts: Napoleonic Wars

William Robert Broughton (22 March 1762 – 14 March 1821) was a British naval officer in the late 18th century. As a lieutenant in the Royal Navy, he commanded HMS Chatham as part of the Vancouver Expedition, a voyage of exploration through the Pacific Ocean led by Captain George Vancouver in the early 1790s.

== Personal life ==
William Robert Broughton was born on 22 March 1762. His father, Charles Broughton, was a Hamburg merchant and his mother, Anne Elizabeth, was the daughter of Baron William de Hertoghe. Broughton married his cousin, Jemima, on 26 November 1802. They had four children.

== Early career ==
Broughton's name was added to the muster of the yacht Catherine on 1 May 1774, as captain's servant but Broughton first went to sea on 18 November when he joined the 14-gun sloop, Falcon which sailed for North America, under the command of Captain John Linzee.

On 14 February 1777, Broughton, by then a midshipman, transferred to Harlem under Lieutenant John Knight. He was appointed to the 64-gun Eagle on 1 July 1778, then in December he joined the seventy-four, Superb as a Master's mate and began service in the East Indies. On 12 January 1782, Broughton was promoted to lieutenant aboard the 68-gun Burford commanded by Captain Peter Rainier. When Burford paid off on 19 July 1784, Broughton went ashore and did not serve again for almost four years.

Broughton resumed his career on 23 June 1788, aboard the 18-gun sloop, Orestes, under Manley Dixon, serving in The Channel and later, the Mediterranean. On 13 May 1790, he moved to HMS Victory and renewed his acquaintance with John Knight, her captain. Broughton's first command came on 18 December when he was given command of the brig, Chatham and asked to accompany George Vancouver in his exploration of the north-west Pacific.

== Vancouver Expedition ==
En route to the Pacific Northwest the expedition spent some time exploring the South Pacific and whilst sailing separately from Vancouver, in November 1791, Broughton and his crew became the first Europeans to sight both The Snares and the Chatham Islands on the 23rd and 29th respectively. The former group contains an island that still bears Broughton's name.

Sometime after their arrival in North America, in 1792, Broughton was given the task of charting a group of islands in the Queen Charlotte Sound. In his honour, Vancouver named them the Broughton Archipelago. In October, Broughton was ordered to explore the lower stretches of the Columbia River, between present-day Oregon and Washington. With several boats from his ship, Broughton and his party navigated upstream as far as the Columbia River Gorge and on 30 October, he reached his farthest point, landing in eastern Multnomah County east of Portland and northwest of Mount Hood, which he named for Viscount Samuel Hood, Admiral of the British Fleet. Late in 1792, Vancouver, stymied by conflicting instructions over Nootka Sound, sent Broughton back to England via Mexico and the Atlantic, bearing dispatches and requesting instructions.

== Exploring Japan and Sakhalin ==
On 3 October 1793, Broughton was promoted to commander and given command of HMS Providence, a ship formerly commanded by Captain William Bligh. The fitting out caused a long delay and the ship didn't sail until February 1795 and when Broughton finally returned to north-west America, he was unable to locate Vancouver. Correctly determining that Vancouver had returned to England having completed his survey, Broughton crossed the Pacific and began a four-year survey of the Asian coast between the latitudes of 35 and 52 degrees north, which would include the Kurile Islands, Japan, Okinawa, and Formosa.

From September 1796 Broughton charted the east coast of Honshu and Hokkaidō before wintering at Macau where he purchased a small schooner to assist the Providence. Next year he returned to Japan where the Providence was wrecked on what was to become known as Providence Reef, now Yabiji (八重干瀬), at Miyako Island. The schooner saved the crew of the wrecked ship and they continued north along the east coast of Honshu. Passing Hokkaido, the expedition sailed north into the Gulf of Tartary along the west coast of Sakhalin. Finding extensive shallows at the north end of the gulf it was falsely concluded that Sakhalin was part of the mainland (a common mistake). Broughton turned south along the coast of Korea and then headed home by way of Trincomalee, Ceylon, where the crew was paid off and he was court-martialled for the loss of his ship. Having been acquitted, he reached England in February 1799 and shortly after began to write his book, "A Voyage of Discovery to the North Pacific Ocean; in which the coast of Asia, from the latitude of 35° north to the latitude of 52° north, the island of Insu (commonly known under the name of Jesso), the north, south and east coasts of Japan, the Lieuchieux and adjacent islands, as well as the coast of Corea, have been examined and surveyed, Performed in His Majesty's Sloop Providence and her tender, in the years 1795, 1796, 1797, 1798". It was published in 1804.

== Later career ==
Having been kept from the greater part of the French Revolutionary War by his book, Broughton resumed his active naval career on 23 June 1801, when he was given command of the 50-gun Batavier in The Channel. He served aboard her until the Peace of Amiens was ratified, in April 1802. In May, Broughton was given command of the 36-gun Penelope, serving in the North Sea, an appointment that lasted until two days before his next command, the seventy-four, Illustrious, on 30 May 1807. In her, Broughton continued service, seeing action at the Battle of the Basque Roads. After the battle, Lord Cochrane proclaimed that Admiral Gambier had not done enough to destroy the French fleet and Gambier demanded a court martial at which he was acquitted, despite Broughton speaking out against him.

In November 1810, Broughton, still in command of Illustrious, took part in the Mauritius Campaign, joining a fleet off the island of Rodriquez, under Vice-admiral Albemarle Bertie. On 29 November, this fleet landed around 10,000 troops at Grande-Baie, north-east of Port-Louis, on the Isle de France which capitulated five days later on 3 December. In 1811, Broughton took part in the Java Expedition. He was initially given command of the expedition by Admiral O'Bryen Drury the then Commander-in-Chief in the East Indies but he was relieved of his post after Drury's death by Admiral Robert Stopford, who had arrived from the Cape. This angered Broughton, who felt that Stopford had exceeded his authority, and who applied for a court-martial, which was ultimately rejected. The mission however was a success, the British having complete control of the island by 18 September 1811.

Broughton resigned his commission on 23 October 1812 but was recalled on 31 May 1815 to serve in the channel as commander of the 100-gun Royal Sovereign. In August 1815 he transferred to Spencer, a seventy-four, serving as a guardship at Plymouth. On 4 June 1815, Broughton was made a Companion of The Most Honourable Order of the Bath and promoted to Colonel of the Marines on 12 March 1819. (Note: Colonel of Marines was a ceremonial rank in the Royal Navy, usually bestowed upon post captains for good service. It carried an increase in salary with no extra duties or responsibilities. Not to be confused with a colonel in the marines.)

== Death and legacy ==
Broughton died in Florence, Italy in 1821, and was buried in the Old English Cemetery, Livorno. He named many locations in the course of his explorations and has been honoured with namings as well:

- Broughton Island (New South Wales) and Providence Bay off Port Stephens, New South Wales, were surveyed by Broughton in August 1795. While there he encountered some escaped convicts whom he took back to Sydney.
- Broughton Island in the Snares Islands, New Zealand is named for Lieutenant Broughton.
- Both Broutona Island and its highest point, 801m Broutona Mount in Russia's Kurils Islands are named for William Robert Broughton.
- Brouton Bay at the northern end of Simushir Island in the Kuril Islands, Russia is named for William Robert Broughton.
- Broughton Arm in Dusky Sound, New Zealand is named for Lieutenant Broughton.
- The Broughton Archipelago, Broughton Island and Broughton Strait in British Columbia's Queen Charlotte Strait region are named for Lieutenant Broughton. A street in Vancouver's West End and a street in Downtown Victoria also bear his name.
- Broughton's Bluff, a popular rock climbing destination at the Lewis and Clark State Recreation Site in Troutdale, Oregon, was named after him in 1926.
- Mount Hood for Viscount Samuel Hood, Admiral of the British Fleet.
- Youngs River and Youngs Bay for his uncle, Admiral Sir George Young.
- Broughton's map of the Columbia River was instrumental in the planning of the Lewis and Clark Expedition.
- Broughton Beach, a popular sandy beach on the Columbia River in Portland, Oregon.
- A plaque erected by the State of Oregon along Interstate 84 in the Columbia Gorge commemorates the spot where Broughton landed in 1792.
- The pub located within the British Embassy in Seoul is named "Broughton's Club" to commemorate Broughton's exploration of Northeast Asia, including the Korean Peninsula.
- A cricket team in the Korea Cricket Association league is named "Broughton's International XI" in his honour.
- Broughton Street in the West End of Vancouver, British Columbia is named in his honour.
- Broughton Avenue in Ham, Richmond upon Thames, London. Close to the hamlet of Petersham in the same borough, where the last dwelling and final resting place of Captain George Vancouver are located.

== See also ==
- European and American voyages of scientific exploration
