= Memkumlis =

Coordinates: 50°37′10″N 126°34′30″W

Memkumlis or, officially Meem Quam Leese, Memkoomlish, Memqumlis, ʼmimkumlis or Miʼmkwamlis, commonly known as Mamalilaculla, which is actually the name of the subgroup of the Kwakwakaʼwakw whose home it is, is located on the west side of Village Island in the Johnstone Strait region of the Central Coast of British Columbia.

The village is on Mahmalillikullah Indian Reserve No. 1 on Eliot Passage, which was created in 1886. The name means "village with rocks and islands out front", or as translated by famous chief and carver Mungo Martin, "group of little islands" and by Franz Boas as "round things [islands] in front at beach".

== History ==
When the Kwikwasutʼinux village of Gwayasdums was destroyed in the 1850s by the Nuxalk, the survivors joined the Mamalilikulla at Memkumlis. The village was partly destroyed by fire in 1892 and rebuilt.

The village's population was estimated at 2000 in 1836-41 (before the Kwikwasutʼinux moved there), but by 1911 it was only 90.

== See also ==
- List of Kwakwakaʼwakw villages
