= Tribune Channel =

Tribune Channel is a channel or strait on the Central Coast of British Columbia, Canada, separating the north and east sides of Gilford Island from the mainland. The channel bends around the island's east side, with the mouth of Thompson Sound at the elbow of the bend, opening eastwards to the mouth of the Kakweiken River.

At its southern end, it opens onto lower Knight Inlet. Viscount Island lies in the left side of the channel within that opening, separated from the adjacent mainland by Sergeaunt Channel at 50°41′04″N 126°11′39″W, at the northeast end of which, on Tribune Channel, is Pumish Point at 50°42′59″N 126°11′20″W At the south end of Sergeaunt Channel, on Knight Inlet, is Steep Head at 50°40′11″N 126°11′02″W.

On the west side of Viscount Island is Nickoll Passage at 50°40′44″N 126°14′29″W.

A beach on the south side of the channel at 50°43′40″N 126°09′00″W, south of the opening of Thompson Sound and opposite the southwest coast of Gilford Island and Kumlah Island, is called tse'lxmedzes in Kwak'wala, meaning "crabapple trees on beach".

Other locations named for HMS Tribune are:

- Tribune Bay Provincial Park and bay of the same name, on the east coast of Hornby Island.
- Tribune Point, on the south side of Gilford Island.
- Tribune Rock, in the Queen Charlotte Strait region to the north of Hurst Island.
