= Village Island =

Island in Canada

Village Island is an island in the Johnstone Strait region of the Central Coast region of British Columbia, Canada, located on the northwest side of Turnour Island.

The Kwakwaka'wakw village of Memkumlis or Meem Quam Leese or Memkoomlish, commonly known as Mamalilaculla, which is actually the name of the subgroup of the Kwakwaka'wakw whose home it is, is located on the west side of the island at 50°37′10″N 126°34′30″W. Its site is on Mahmalillikullah Indian Reserve No. 1. on Eliot Passage. The name means "village with rocks and islands out front", or as translated by famous chief and carver Mungo Martin, "group of little islands" and by Franz Boas as "round things [islands] in front at beach".

== See also ==
- List of islands of British Columbia
- Village (disambiguation)
