= Mamalilikala =

North American indigenous nation

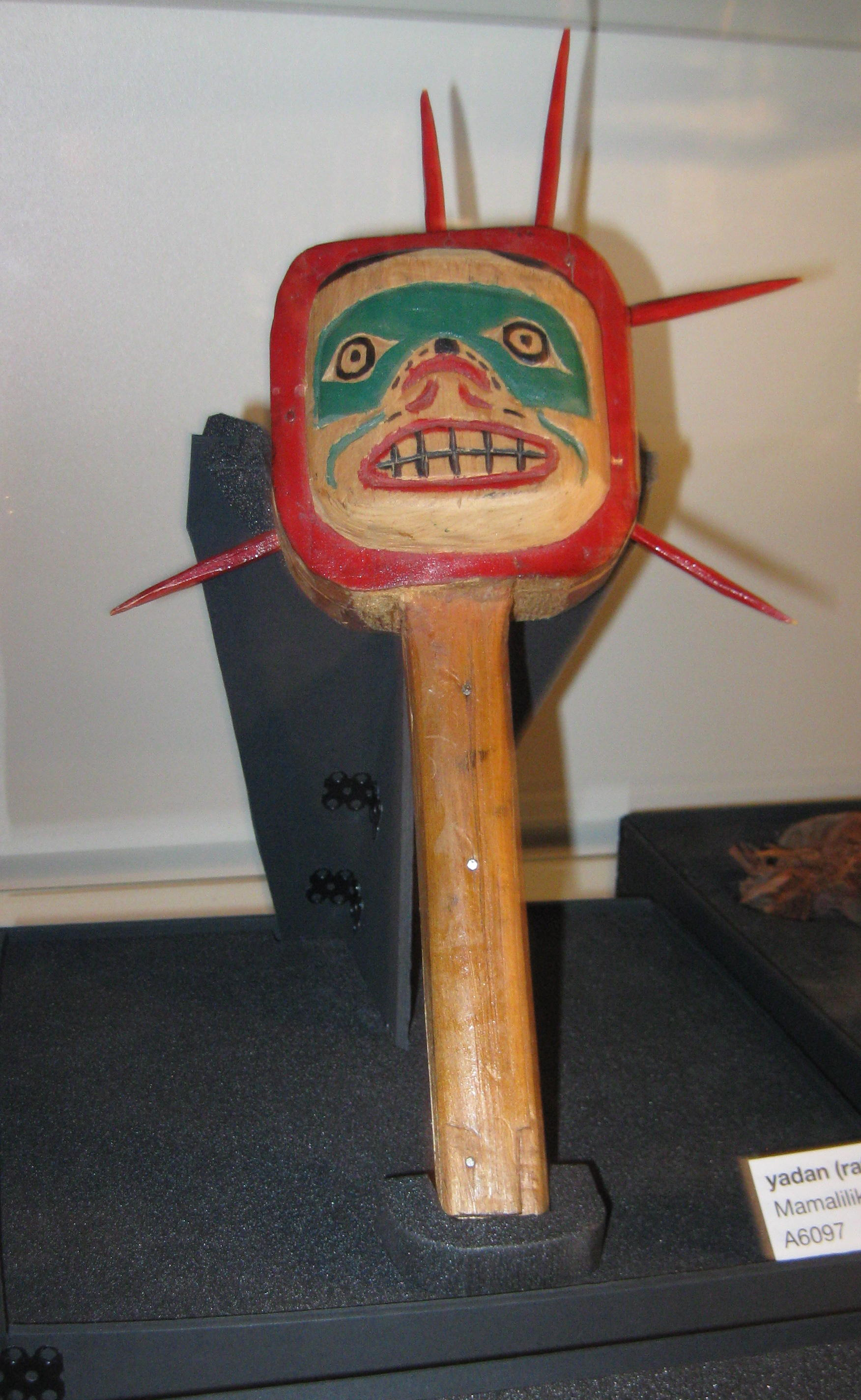
A Mamalilikala people's rattle.

The Mamalilikala (Mamalelequala, Mamalilikulla, Mamalillaculla, Mamaleleqala) are an indigenous nation, a part of the Kwakwakaʼwakw, in central British Columbia, on northern Vancouver Island. Their main village was Memkumlis (ʼMimkwamlis), located on Village Island. Their Indian Act band government is the Mamalilikulla-qwe'qwa'sot'em First Nation.

== See also ==
- Kwakwaka'wakw
