= Gilford Island =

Island in British Columbia, Canada

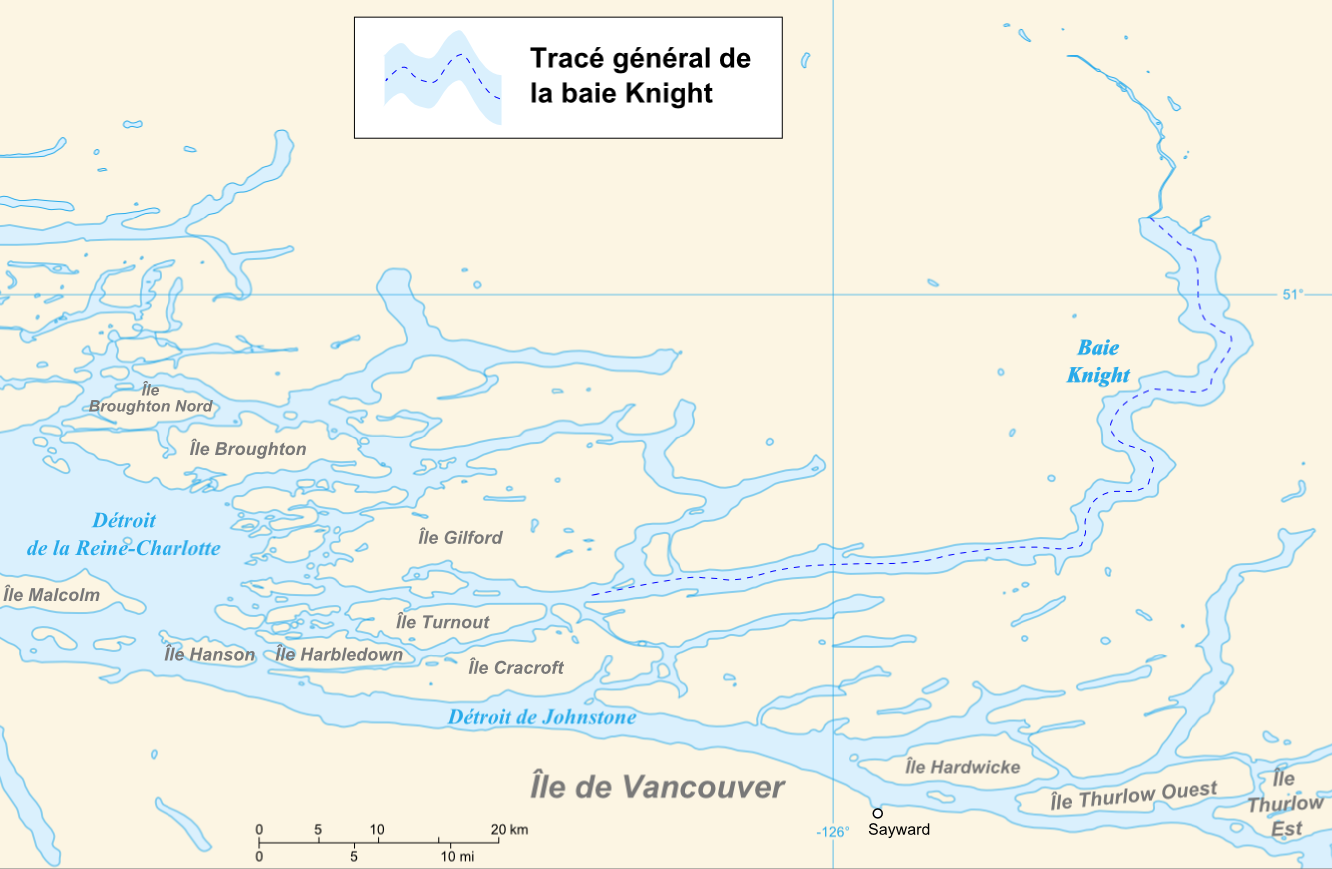
Gilford Island (centre left) among the islands of the Broughton Archipelago

Gilford Island is an island in British Columbia, Canada, between Tribune Channel and Knight Inlet. It has an area of 384 square kilometres (148 sq mi). Turnour Island is to its south, across Tribune Channel; and the entrance to Thompson Sound is to its east.

Port Elizabeth is a large bay or port on the island's south side, at 50°40′26″N 126°28′29″W. It was named by Captain Pender about 1867 for Elizabeth Henrietta, wife of Lord Gilford and daughter or Sir Arthur E. Kennedy, Governor of Vancouver Island at the time HMS Tribune was assigned to the Pacific Station, 1862–1864, under Lord Gilford's command. Gilford Point at 50°39′06″N 126°26′26″W marks the south side of the entrance to Port Elizabeth. Duck Cove at 50°39′42″N 126°31′18″W is at the head of the port. Maple Cove, formerly Maple Bay, is on the port's north side at 50°40′43″N 126°27′45″W

== Indian reserves and other settlements ==
All Indian reserves on Gilford Island are under the administration of the Kwikwasut'inuxw Haxwa'mis First Nation.

There is on the island an historic indigenous community of the Kwakwaka'wakw people called Gwayasdums or Gwa'yasdams, which was destroyed by the Nuxalk in 1856 though today has been reoccupied.

Another former village, Metap, was at the head of Viner Sound on the island's northwest coast, though today there is only an Indian reserve, officially named "Meetup Indian Reserve No. 2".

Another Indian reserve on Gilford Island, Dakiulis Indian Reserve No. 7, is at the tip of Islet Point on the northwest side of the island, 0.70 ha. at 50°44′00″N 126°34′00″W

Kyimla Indian Reserve No. 11 is on the east side of the island at Trafford Point. It is 1.10 ha. in size and is located at 50°44′00″N 126°09′00″W.

Another settlement on the island is Scott Cove, at the bay of the same name on the northwest side of the island.
