= List of islands of British Columbia =

This is a list of islands of British Columbia.

== South Coast ==
=== Vancouver Island ===
- Vancouver Island

=== Gulf of Georgia ===
==== Gulf Islands ====
===== Southern Gulf Islands =====
- Brethour Island
- Cabbage Island
- Curlew Island
- De Courcy Islands
  - Mudge Island
  - Link Island
  - Ruxton Island
  - Pylades Island
- Gabriola Island
- Galiano Island
- Gossip Island
- SISȻENEM (formerly Halibut Island)
- Hudson Island
- James Island
- Leech Island
- Little Shell Island
- Mayne Island
- Moresby Island
- Parker Island
- Penelakut Island (formerly Kuper Island)
- Pender Island (North and South)
- Piers Island
- Portland Island
- Prevost Island
- Pylades Island
- Reid Island
- Russell Island
- Ruxton Island
- Saltspring Island
- Samuel Island
- Saturna Island
- Secret Island
- Secretary Islands
- Sidney Island
- Tent Island
- Tree Island
- Tumbo Island
- Thetis Island
- Valdes Island
- Wallace Island
- Whaleboat Island
- Wise Island

===== Northern Gulf Islands =====
- Ahgykson Island
- Ballenas Islands
- Denman Island
- Hornby Island
- Jedediah Island
- Lasqueti Island
- Sandy Island (aka Tree Island)
- Savary Island
- Texada Island

===== Discovery Islands =====
While included here, because of their location at the northern end of the Gulf of Georgia, Cortes and Quadra islands are often categorized as part of the Northern Gulf Islands.

- Cortes Island
- East Redonda Island
- East Thurlow Island
- Hernando Island
- Maurelle Island
- Quadra Island
- Read Island
- Rendezvous Islands
- Sonora Island
- Stuart Island
- West Redonda Island
- West Thurlow Island

===== Sunshine Coast =====
- Edgecombe Island
- Grant Island
- Merry Island
- Nelson Island
- Thormanby Islands

===== Howe Sound =====
- Anvil Island
- Bowen Island
- Bowyer Island
- Defence Islands
- Gambier Island
- Keats Island

- Pasley Island

==== West Coast of Vancouver Island ====
===== Barclay Sound =====
- Broken Islands Group

===== Cape Scott =====
- Cape Scott Islands
- Lanz and Cox Islands

===== Nootka Sound =====
- Bligh Island
- Nootka Island

===== Kyuquot Sound =====
- Union Island

===== Clayoquot Sound =====
- Meares Island
- Flores Island
- Vargas Island
- Solander Island

==== Lower Mainland ====
NB Most of the islands in this section are river or lake islands, not coastal islands. Deadman's Island is in Coal Harbour (Burrard Inlet), Echo and Long Islands are in Harrison Lake. All others are in the Fraser River and its estuary.

- Annacis Island
- Barnston Island
- Deadman's Island (Burrard Inlet)
- Deas Island
- Douglas Island
- Crescent Island
- Echo Island
- Herrling Island
- Iona Island
- Long Island
- Lulu Island
- Matsqui Island
- McMillan Island
- Mitchell Island
- Nicomen Island
- Poplar Island
- Sea Bird Island
- Sea Island
- Shady Island
- Westham Island

== Central Coast ==
=== Johnstone Strait-Queen Charlotte Strait region ===
- Broughton Archipelago
  - Broughton Island
  - North Broughton Island
  - Eden Island
  - Bonwick Island
  - Baker Island
- Cormorant Island (loc. of Alert Bay)
- Hardwicke Island
- Harbledown Island, site of New Vancouver
- Malcolm Island (loc. of Sointula)
- Turnour Island, site of Kalugwis (Karlukwees)
- Village Island, site of Memkumlis (Mamalilikalla)
- Hull Island
- West Cracroft Island
- East Cracroft Island
- Klaoitsis Island
- Kamano Island
- Hanson Island
- Minstrel Island
- Gilford Island, site of Gwayasdums

=== Fitz Hugh Sound-Dean Channel region ===
- Calvert Island
- Campbell Island
- Cunningham Island
- Denny Island
- Dufferin Island
- King Island
- Hecate Island
- Hunter Island
- Yeo Island

== North Coast ==
=== Queen Charlotte Sound-Hecate Strait region ===
- Aristazabal Island
- Banks Island
- Calvert Island
- Campania Island
- Dowager Island
- Estevan Group
- Gribbell Island
- Gil Island
- Hawkesbury Island
- Kohl Island
- Lady Douglas Island
- McCauley Island
- Pitt Island
- Pooley Island
- Porcher Island
- Price Island
- Princess Royal Island
- Roderick Island
- Sarah Island
- Susan Island
- Swindle Island

=== Dixon Entrance-Portland Channel region ===
- Digby Island
- Dundas Island
- Kaien Island (site of Prince Rupert)
- Pearse Island
- Somerville Island
- Stephens Island
- Wales Island

== Haida Gwaii (Queen Charlotte Islands) ==
- Anthony Island
- Burnaby Island
- Chaatl Island
- Frederick Island
- Graham Island
- Hibben Island
- Hippa Island
- Hotspring Island
- Huxley Island
- Kunghit Island
- Langara Island
- Louise Island
- Lyell Island
- Maude Island
- Moresby Island
- Ramsay Island
- Talunkwan Island
- Tanu Island

== Interior ==
- Grant Island, Lake Okanagan
- Rattlesnake Island, Lake Okanagan
- Copper Island, Shuswap Lake
- Lady Franklin Rock, Fraser Canyon
- Saddle Rock, Fraser Canyon
- Zuckerberg Island, at the confluence of the Kootenay and Columbia Rivers

== See also ==
- British Columbia Coast
