= Dorman Island =

Island in British Columbia, Canada

Coordinates: 50°36′07″N 126°20′12″W

Dorman Island is an island in the Johnstone Strait region of the Central Coast of British Columbia, Canada, between West and East Cracroft Islands on the north side of the isthmus that joins them at low tide. Until 1940, with Farquharson Island, it was one of a group called the Double Islands; they were renamed to avoid duplication of the name elsewhere.

== Name origin ==
Dorman Island was named for J.G. (Jack) "Johnny Bones" Dorman, who surveyed, built and operated the Bones Bay cannery until the 1954 when it closed down. He was born October 17, 1889, at Port Greville, Nova Scotia, working there for the Wallace Fish Company (which became the New England Fish Company, later renamed the Canadian Fishing Company). He came out to Vancouver with his family around 1910 and worked at the Kildonan and Uchucklesit canneries near Alberni Inlet. Keeper of Wales Island cannery on the North Coast in 1926, and at the one at Shushartie on northern Vancouver Island in 1927. In 1928, he surveyed the site for the cannery at Bones Bay [about 1 mile southwest of Dorman Island on the north shore of West Cracroft Island, building it and operating it until 1954 - the only cannery operator to never have a can rejected. He died on February 9, 1969; his ashes were buried in an unmarked grave on the shores of Bones Bay.

== See also ==
- List of islands of British Columbia
- Dorman (disambiguation)
- Minstrel Island
