= Tlowitsis Nation =

First Nation government in British Columbia, Canada

The Tlowitsis Nation, formerly the Klowitsis Tribe, the Turnour Island Band and the Tlowitsis-Mumtagila First Nation, is the Indian Act band government of the Ławit'sis (Tlowitsis) tribe of the Kwakwaka'wakw peoples, located in the Queen Charlotte Strait-Johnstone Strait area in the Discovery Islands between Vancouver Island and the British Columbia mainland in Canada. Ławit'sis territory covers parts of northern Vancouver Island, Johnstone Strait, and adjoining inlets of the mainland. Kalugwis, on Turnour Island, was their principal community in times past, but the band's offices are in the city of Campbell River to the southeast. Hanatsa IR No. 6 on Port Neville is the most populated of the band's Indian reserves.

== Relationship with the Ma'amtagila First Nation ==
The Tlowitsis First Nation has a long and contentious relationship with a neighbouring nation, the Ma'amtagila (also known as Mahteelthpe, Matilpi, or Mumtagila).

In 1879, the newly formed Canadian government recognized the existence of the Klowitsis Tribe and the Matilpi Tribe. Each had their own reserves and chiefs.

In 1945, the Klowitsis Tribe and Matilpi Tribe were amalgamated to create the Turnour Island Tribe. The amalgamation was ordered by the Indian Agent, in order to make the management of these two smaller tribes easier. Members of the Matilpi agreed to join the Klowitsis Tribe with the understanding that their two chiefs would govern "with equal powers and responsibilities."

In 1983, the name was changed to the Tlowitsis-Mumtagila First Nation, in order to more accurately reflect the Indigenous titles.

In 1998, 'Mumtagila' was removed from the name. The leadership of the Tlowitsis First Nation asserted that the Matilpi/Ma'amtagila "ceded title and authority to their lands to the chiefs of the Tlowitsis," a claim which the Ma'amtagila dispute.

The Ma'amtagila maintain that they are still in existence today and have their own songs, oral histories and recognition by the various tribes that comprise the Kwakwaka'wakw-speaking peoples. Their primary dwelling places were Matilpi Village and Haylate. They were the "protectors" of the Kwakwaka'wakw, as told by the various elders of the many tribes of the Kwakwaka'wakw. these locations were central to the overall territories of the Kwakwaka'wakw people, allowing them to defend both the northern and southern tribes. The Ma'amtagila were also known for their harvesting of Cedar trees and carving.

== Indian reserves ==
Indian reserves under the governance of the Tlowitsis Nation are:

- Aglakumna IR No. 4A, on the south shore of Harbledown Island, near the west entrance to Baronet Passage, 4.10 ha. 50°33′00″N 126°39′00″W
- Aglakmuna-la IR No. 2, on Klaoitsis Island in Beware Passage, at the east end of Harbledown Island, 0.30 ha. 50°34′00″N 126°31′00″W
- Coffin Island IR No. 3, on Kamano (Coffin) Island at the east end of Beware Passage, at the east end of Harbledown Island, 6.10 ha. 50°34′00″N 126°30′00″W
- Etsekin IR No. 1, on the east shore of Havannah Channel, east of the north end of Hull Island and including three small islands adjacent, and the locality of Matilpi, 13.20 ha. 50°33′30″N 126°11′12″W
- Hanatsa IR No. 6, on the south shore of Port Neville, 95.10 ha. 50°32′00″N 125°58′00″W
- Haylahte IR No. 3, at the mouth of the Adam River, on Johnstone Strait, 19.0 ha. 50°28′00″N 126°16′00″W
- Karlukwees IR No. 1, on the south shore of Turnour Island on Beware Passage, including three small islands, 10.80 ha. 50°34′45″N 126°29′54″W
- Keecekiltum IR No. 2, on the east shore of Port Harvey on East Cracroft Island, 11.70 ha. 50°33′00″N 126°16′00″W
- Pawala IR No. 5, at the head of Call Inlet, 1.0 ha. 50°37′00″N 125°55′00″W
- Port Neville IR No. 4, at the head of Port Neville on its north shore, 14.9 ha. 50°34′00″N 125°56′00″W
- Small Island IR No. 4, on Small Island in Beware Passage, between Cracroft and Turnour Islands, 0.20 ha. 50°34′00″N 126°29′00″W

== Treaty Process ==
They have reached Stage 5 in the BC Treaty Process.

== Demographics ==
Number of Band Members: 372

== See also ==
- List of Kwakwaka'wakw villages
