= Cracroft =

Cracroft may refer to:

- Cracroft, New Zealand, a suburb of Christchurch, New Zealand

- Cracroft Caverns, a series of large chambers in Christchurch's Port Hills

- Cracroft, British Columbia, locality at the east end of Forward Bay on the south side of West Cracroft Island in the Johnstone Strait region of the Central Coast of British Columbia, Canada

- Cracroft Islands, islands in the Johnstone Strait region of the Central Coast of British Columbia, Canada
  - West Cracroft Island, the larger of the two Cracroft Islands
    - Cracroft Point is the headland at the western tip of West Cracroft Island
  - East Cracroft Island, the smaller of the two Cracroft Islands

- Cracroft (name), a surname and, less commonly, given name
