= Small Island Indian Reserve No. 4 =

Coordinates: 50°34′00″N 126°29′00″W

Small Island Indian Reserve No. 4, a.k.a. Small Island 4, is an Indian reserve of the Tlowitsis Nation located on Small Island in Beware Passage, south of Turnour Island, east of Harbledown Island, and west of West Cracroft Island.

== See also ==
- List of Indian reserves in British Columbia
