= Kohl Island =

Kohl Island may refer to the following places:

- Kohl Island (Alaska)
- Kohl Island (British Columbia)
