= Blowhole =

Blowhole may refer to:

- Blowhole (anatomy), the hole at the top of a whale's or other cetacean's head
- Blowhole (geology), a hole at the inland end of a sea cave
  - Kiama Blowhole in Kiama, Australia
  - The Blow Hole, a marine passage between Minstrel and East Cracroft Islands in the Central Coast of British Columbia, Canada
- Blowhole Diversion Tunnel in Victoria, Australia
- A type of casting defect in metalworking

== See also ==
- Category:Blowholes
