= Curlew Island (Gulf Islands) =

Island in British Columbia, Canada

- Location of Curlew Island in British Columbia

Geography
- Location: Strait of Georgia
- Coordinates: 48°49′49″N 123°14′27″W
- Archipelago: Gulf Islands
- Highest elevation: 41 m (135 ft)

Administration
- Canada
- Province: British Columbia

Curlew Island is a small island in the southern Gulf Islands, located in the Strait of Georgia between Mayne Island and Samuel Island in British Columbia, Canada. It was presumably named after the British sloop HMS Curlew.

== See also ==
- List of islands of British Columbia
