= Bones Bay =

Bay in British Columbia, Canada

Coordinates: 50°35′10″N 126°21′33″W

Bones Bay is located inside the territorial properties of the Namgiis indigenous peoples on a bay the north side of West Cracroft Island in the Johnstone Strait region of the Central Coast of British Columbia, Canada, on Clio Channel.

It is historically important for serving as a quarantine refuge in response to the illegal expulsion of smallpox infected persons, all of whom were indigenous citizens from Fort Victoria during the introduced smallpox plague of 1862. The Naamgiis people prepared this quarantine site for 25 Haida canoes that had been forcibly removed under threat of weapons and after their homes in Ogden Point, Rock Bay, and Cadboro Bay had been burnt down by British police. Most but not all the Haida refugees died in the Bones Bay quarantine site but all were supplied with water, food, and shelter by the Naamgiis.

James Douglas, the governor of the colony of British Columbia, contributed $100 to a Christian effort to build a pest house for the dying. Jewish merchants asked James Douglas to stop the expulsion.

From 1952 through to 1963, it was recorded in Canadian history that a steamer landing on the Union Steamships schedule as a "summer call by request, served by Frank Waterhouse & Co. when freight is offering", and was reached via Minstrel Island. BC Pilot, a guide to the region's waters, in its Vol. 1, 1965 edition, said of it "...a former fishing settlement with a cannery which has become inoperative. From June to September approximately, there is a fish scow moored at the site, where gas can be obtained in limited quantities...". A 1967 report from the forest ranger at Alert Bay said there was a cannery in operation here, but by 1987 there was no permanent settlement. The name and status of locality was rescinded in 1988.

== Name origin ==
The name Bones Bay is believed to have derived from a visit by a boat, believed to be HMS Amethyst, carrying Lord Dufferin, then-Governor General of Canada, and his wife which carried the viceregal couple on a voyage up the coast to Metlakatla in 1876. According to one of the crew, a Patrick Riley, the Amethyst's crew performed regularly as a troupe of "minstrels", white people made up in blackface, who provided entertainment for shipmates and visitors, and the name likely commemorates a performance in these waters. Minstrel Island and nearby Sambo Point nearby are related names.

Another version of the name comes from the founder of the Bones Bay Cannery, Jack Dorman, who is the namesake of nearby Dorman Island.

== See also ==
- List of settlements in British Columbia
