= Maxine Matilpi =

Visual artist (born 1956)

Maxine Matilpi (1956) is a Kwakwaka'wakw artist from Alert Bay, Canada.

== Early life ==
Matilpi's early years were spent on Turmour Island, BC in her home village of Karlukwees. There she learned to speak Kwak’wala as her first language. She was educated and trained in the ways of her traditional culture.

== Work ==
She is known for making Chief's regalia as well as textile "button blankets" using an appliqué process, and mother of pearl buttons. Her first button blanket was created in 1985. Matilpi describes her work, Button Blanket, in the collection of the Museum of Fine Arts Boston as having a "central black field symboliz[ing] the door to a longhouse. The red borders recall the planks from which a longhouse is made, and the plaid textile at the top center represents the smoke hole of a long house. Matilpi has made approximately 100 ceremonial objects; in addition to button blankets she has created tunics, dance aprons and ceremonial vests.

== Collections ==
Her work is included in the collections of the Seattle Art Museum, the McCord Museum, and the Museum of Fine Arts, Boston.

== Personal life ==
Matilpi is married to the carver John Livingston a master carver who died in 2019.
