= Havannah Channel =

Channel in British Columbia, Canada

Havannah Channel is a marine passageway in the South Coast region of British Columbia, Canada, leading off of the north side of Johnstone Strait leading to Chatham Channel and Call Inlet, south of East Cracroft Island. Havannah Channel is entered from Johnstone Strait at the Broken Islands. Hull Island is located in the channel, to the southeast of East Cracroft and south of the opening of Call Inlet.

== Name origin ==
Havannah Channel was named for HMS Havannah, which served on the Pacific Station from 1855 to 1859. Havannah's captain was Thomas Harvey, namesake of Port Harvey, which is a bay or port on the north side of the channel formed by the division of the two Cracroft Islands.

== Indian reserves and villages ==
Etsekin IR No. 1 is on the east shore of Havannah Channel, east of the north end of Hull Island and including three small islands adjacent, and the locality of Matilpi, 13.20 ha. at 50°33′30″N 126°11′12″W.
