= Haylahte Indian Reserve No. 3 =

Coordinates: 50°28′00″N 126°16′00″W

Haylahte Indian Reserve No. 3, officially Haylahte 3, is an Indian reserve under the administration of the Tlowitsis Nation band government, located at the mouth of the Adam River on Johnstone Strait on northern Vancouver Island. The Matilpi village of Klaywatse was located nearby to the west, on an island in the mouth of the Adam River.

In 1885, the reserve was allotted by the Government of Canada to the Ma'amtagila First Nation, known then as Mahteelthpe or Matilpi Tribe. In 1945, the Ma'amtagila amalgamated with the Tlowitsis Tribe to create the Tlowitsis-Mumtagila First Nation.
