= Klaoitsis Island =

Island in British Columbia, Canada

Coordinates: 50°33′52″N 126°28′43″W

Klaoitsis Island, also perhaps Adlagamalla in Kwak'wala, is an island in the Johnstone Strait region of the Central Coast region of British Columbia, Canada. It is located to the south of Turnour Island in Clio Channel. The name is an alternate spelling of Ławit'sis or Tlowitsis, the name of the Kwakwaka'wakw group whose territory it is in.

Aglakumna-la Indian Reserve No. 2, a.k.a. Aglakumna-la 2, is an Indian reserve of the Tlowitsis Nation located on the island, which is also known as Aglakumnala Island.

== See also ==
- List of islands of British Columbia
