= Port Neville =

Bay in British Columbia, Canada

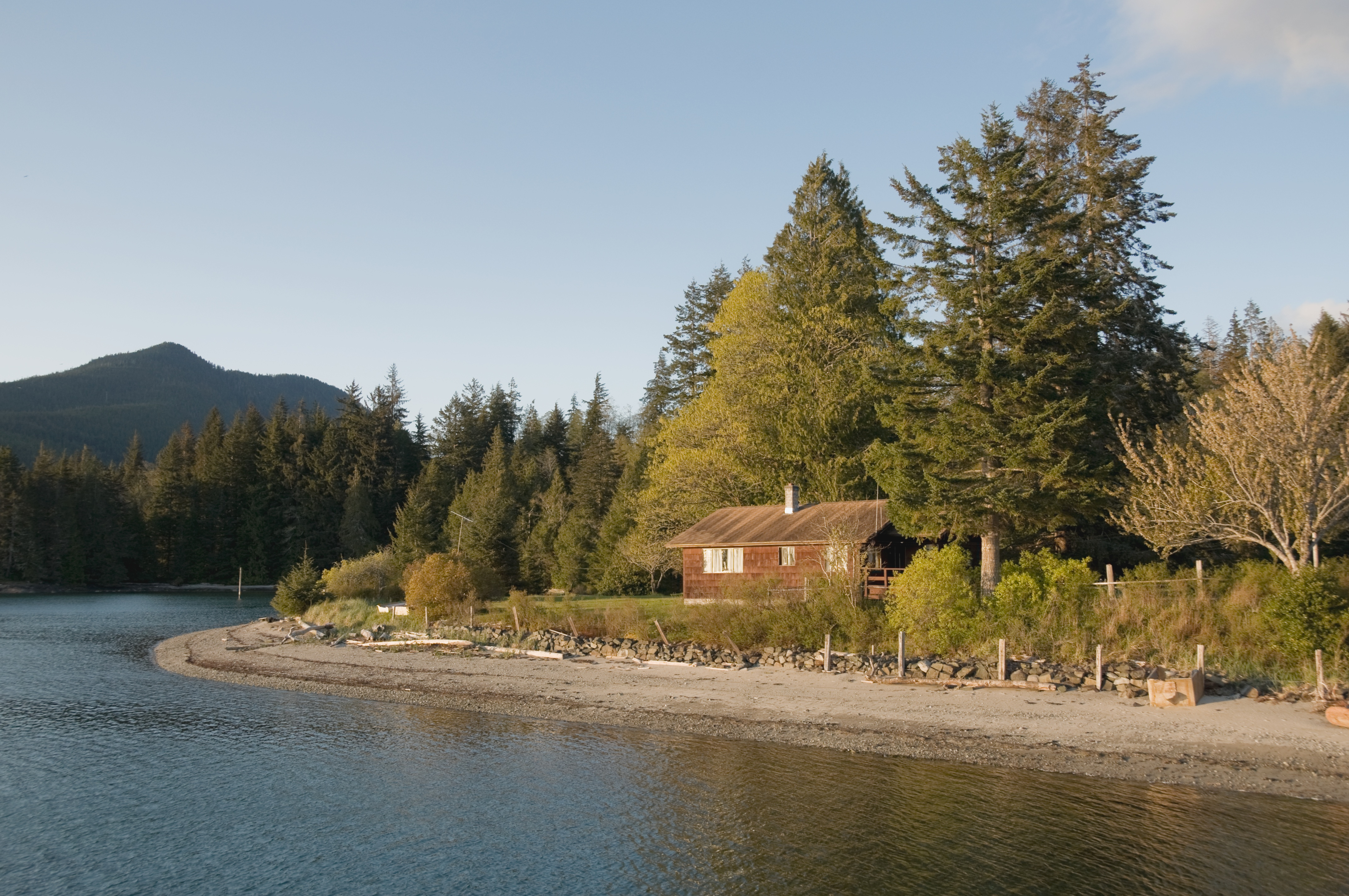
Building in Port Neville, 2008

Port Neville is a bay, port and locality on the north side of Johnstone Strait, south of Call Inlet, in the Central Coast region of British Columbia, Canada.

The locality of Port Neville, which had a post office until 2013, is located on the east side of the narrows that form the opening into Johnstone Strait of the port, which is really an inlet, at 50°30′00″N 126°05′00″W.

Port Neville Indian Reserve No. 4, or Port Neville 4, is located at the upper end of the port, to the south of Fulmore Lake at 50°34′00″N 125°56′00″W It is 14.9 ha. in size and is under the governance of the Tlowitsis Tribe band government of the Kwakwaka'wakw peoples. It is one of 11 reserves governed by the Tlowitsis, another of which is also on Port Neville, Hanatsa Indian Reserve No. 6, or Hanatsa 6, 95.1 ha. in size, is located on the south shore of the upper end of Port Neville at 50°32′00″N 125°58′00″W, to the east of Hanatsa Point at 50°31′47″N 125°59′54″W, which is at a narrows between the upper end of the port and the wider area towards its opening.

On the east shore of the port is xudzedzalis, a fort utilized by the Matilpi group of Kwakwaka'wakw. at 50°31′20″N 126°03′40″W. Its name means "fort on flat on beach".

This "very snug and commodious port" was named by Captain Vancouver probably in honour of Lieutenant John Neville of the Royal Marines but there is doubt about who he referred to.

== See also ==
- List of settlements in British Columbia
