= Cracroft, British Columbia =

Cracroft is a locality at the east end of Forward Bay on the south side of West Cracroft Island in the Johnstone Strait region of the Central Coast of British Columbia, Canada.

The Cracroft post office and accompanying settlement was originally listed as being at the head of Port Harvey, at 50°34′10″N 126°16′20″W at the head of Port Harvey, but moved about 1/2 mile east prior to 1928, with the post office having opened in 1905. It was relocated to Forward Bay in 1951, with the post office closing later that same year. In 1961, there were 2 people residing at the original location of the Cracroft Bay Post Office, with 4 living there in 1976.

== Name origin ==
The Cracroft Islands were named in 1861 by Captain Richards of HMS Plumper for Sophia Cracroft, the niece of Sir John Franklin, the explorer. She accompanied Lady Jane Franklin on her round-the-world voyage, which brought them to British Columbia during the Fraser Gold Rush of 1858. They remained in British Columbia and explored its coast in 1861 before returning to England. Other features named for her in this area are the Sophia Islets off the southwest side of the island, and Cracroft Point, with the nearby Franklin Range across Johnstone Strait on Vancouver Island being named for Sir John and Lady Franklin.
