= Klaywatse =

Former village in British Columbia, Canada

Coordinates: 50°27′55″N 126°16′45″W

Klaywatse was a village of the Matilpi group of Kwakwaka'wakw, located to the west of today's Haylahte IR No. 3 in British Columbia, on an island in the mouth of the Adam River.

== See also ==
- List of Kwakwaka'wakw villages
