= Cracroft, New Zealand =

Cracroft
- Suburb
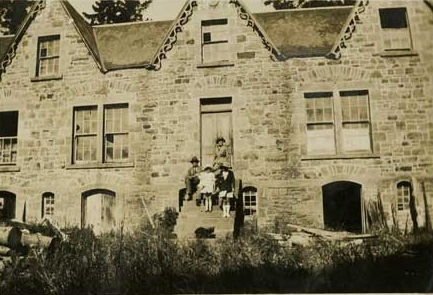
- Old Stone House in Cracroft in the 1930s
- Interactive map of Cracroft
- Coordinates: 43°34′50″S 172°37′0″E
- Country: New Zealand
- City: Christchurch
- Local authority: Christchurch City Council
- Electoral ward: Cashmere
- Community board: Waihoro Spreydon-Cashmere-Heathcote

Area
  - Land: 1.89 ha (4.7 acres)

Population (2023 census)
  - Total: 246
  - Density: 13,000/km^{2} (33,700/sq mi)

Cracroft is a south-west suburb of Christchurch, Canterbury, New Zealand.

Cracroft was named for John Cracroft Wilson, who settled in this part of Christchurch at the bottom of the Port Hills Range in 1854. The Cracroft Residents' Association started lobbying for Cracroft to become a suburb in 1993, and the New Zealand Geographic Board gazetted the suburb in 1999, splitting the area from Cashmere.

== Demographics ==
Cracroft covers 1.89 km^{2} (0.73 sq mi). It is part of the larger statistical area of Westmorland.

Historical population
Year	Pop.	±% p.a.
2013	51	—
2018	54	+1.15%
2023	246	+35.43%

Cracroft had a population of 246 in the 2023 New Zealand census, an increase of 192 people (355.6%) since the 2018 census, and an increase of 195 people (382.4%) since the 2013 census. There were 129 males, 114 females, and 3 people of other genders in 81 dwellings. 3.7% of people identified as LGBTIQ+. The median age was 39.8 years (compared with 38.1 years nationally). There were 54 people (22.0%) aged under 15 years, 33 (13.4%) aged 15 to 29, 126 (51.2%) aged 30 to 64, and 27 (11.0%) aged 65 or older.

People could identify as more than one ethnicity. The results were 90.2% European (Pākehā); 2.4% Māori; 7.3% Asian; 1.2% Middle Eastern, Latin American and African New Zealanders (MELAA); and 4.9% other, which includes people giving their ethnicity as "New Zealander". English was spoken by 95.1%, Māori by 1.2%, and other languages by 11.0%. No language could be spoken by 2.4% (e.g. too young to talk). The percentage of people born overseas was 19.5, compared with 28.8% nationally.

Religious affiliations were 22.0% Christian, 1.2% Islam, 1.2% Jewish, and 1.2% other religions. People who answered that they had no religion were 69.5%, and 4.9% of people did not answer the census question.

Of those at least 15 years old, 66 (34.4%) people had a bachelor's or higher degree, 96 (50.0%) had a post-high school certificate or diploma, and 24 (12.5%) people exclusively held high school qualifications. The median income was $74,300, compared with $41,500 nationally. 69 people (35.9%) earned over $100,000 compared to 12.1% nationally. The employment status of those at least 15 was 108 (56.2%) full-time, 45 (23.4%) part-time, and 6 (3.1%) unemployed.

== See also ==
- Cracroft, British Columbia
- Cracroft Islands, British Columbia
