= Moresby Island (disambiguation) =

Moresby Island is in the Haida Gwaii archipelago of British Columbia, Canada.

Moresby Island may also refer to:

- Moresby Island (Gulf Islands), in the Gulf Islands of British Columbia
- Moresby Island (Peros Banhos), an island on the Peros Banhos Atoll in the Chagos Archipelago of the British Indian Ocean Territory
