= Brethour Island =

Island in British Columbia, Canada

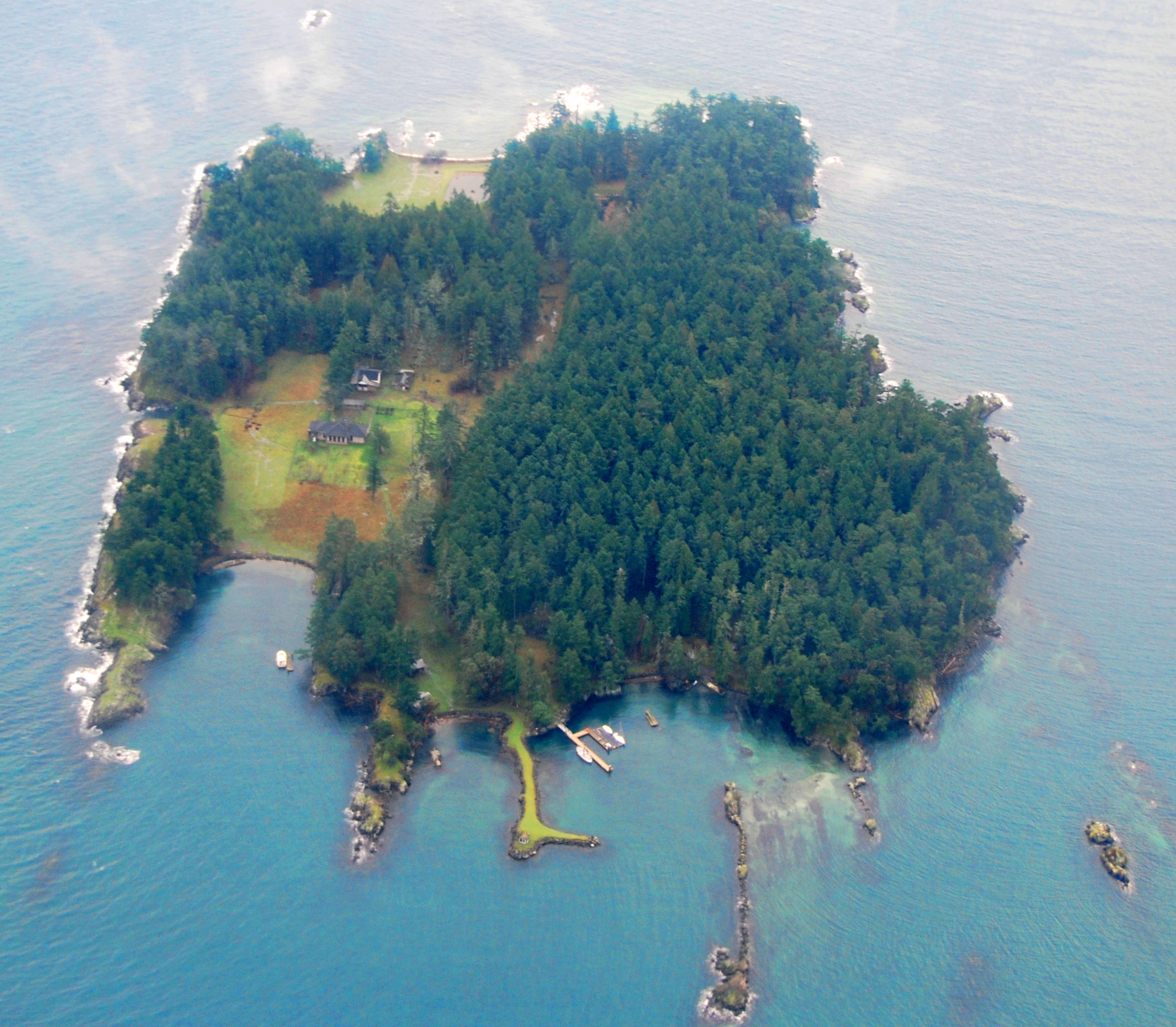
- Aerial view of Brethour Island

- Location of Brethour Island in British Columbia

Geography
- Location: Haro Strait
- Coordinates: 48°40′41″N 123°19′09″W
- Archipelago: Gulf Islands
- Highest elevation: 26 m (85 ft)

Administration
- Canada
- Province: British Columbia

Brethour Island is a small island in the southern Gulf Islands, located in the Strait of Georgia between Vancouver Island and the Lower Mainland in British Columbia, Canada. It is approximately 3 kilometres (1.9 mi) south of Moresby Island. The island, located northeast of Sidney, was named after a pioneer family who owned the present-day site of Sidney around 1873.

== See also ==
- List of islands of British Columbia
