= The Blow Hole =

Strait in British Columbia, Canada

Coordinates: 50°36′29″N 126°18′24″W

The Blow Hole is a short marine passage or strait separating Minstrel Island on the north from East Cracroft Island to the south, in the lower Knight Inlet region of the Central Coast region of British Columbia, Canada. At its east end is the northern end of Chatham Channel, which separates East Cracroft from the mainland to the east, and leads southeast to the opening of Call Inlet and beyond to Johnstone Strait via Havannah Passage.
