= Baronet Passage =

Strait in British Columbia, Canada

Coordinates: 50°33′01″N 126°35′18″W

Baronet Passage is a strait or channel in the Central Coast region of British Columbia, Canada, between Harbledown (N) and West Cracroft Islands (S). The Kwak'wala name for this body of water is Dàmliwas. It meets Beware Passage at its eastern end.
