= Kamano Island =

Island in Canada

Coordinates: 50°34′23″N 126°30′06″W

Kamano Island is an island in the Queen Charlotte Strait-Johnstone Strait region of the Central Coast of British Columbia, located east of Harbledown Island and between Turnour Island (N) and Village Island (S).

Also historically named Coffin Island, it is the location of Coffin Island Indian Reserve No. 3, which is under the governance of the Tlowitsis Nation. There is another Coffin Island at the tip of the headland in front of Ladysmith Harbour on southern Vancouver Island.

== Name origin ==
The island was named for the first non-native settler on Harbledown Island, George Kamano (c1822-1919), who was of Hawaiian or Tahitian descent. An employee of the Hudson's Bay Company at Fort Rupert from 1854 to 1869, he disappeared from the fort in 1870. It is thought that he then settled on Harbledown. He died in 1919 at Alert Bay.

== See also ==
- List of islands of British Columbia
