= Cracroft (name) =

Cracroft is a surname. Some notable people with the name include:

== As a surname ==
- Bridget Cracroft-Eley (1933–2008), British magistrate
- John Cracroft-Amcotts (1891–1956), English politician
- Richard H. Cracroft (1936–2012), American author and academic
- Sophia Cracroft (1816–1892), niece of the explorer Sir John Franklin. Namesake of West Cracroft Island, East Cracroft Island, and the Sophia Islets.
- Weston Cracroft Amcotts (born William Cracroft; 1815–1883), English MP
  - Weston Cracroft-Amcotts (1888–1975), English politician, grandson of the above

== As a middle name ==
- Wilfrid Cracroft Ash (1884–1968), British civil engineer
- Bernard Cracroft Aston (1871–1951), New Zealand chemist and botanist
- Andrew Cracroft Becher (1858–1929), British Army officer
- Arthur Cracroft Gibson (1863–1895), British cricketer
- Mary Victoria Cracroft Grigg (1897–1971), New Zealand politician
- John Cracroft Wilson (1808–1881), British Indian civil servant
