= Beware Passage =

Strait in Canada

Coordinates: 50°35′09″N 126°32′27″W

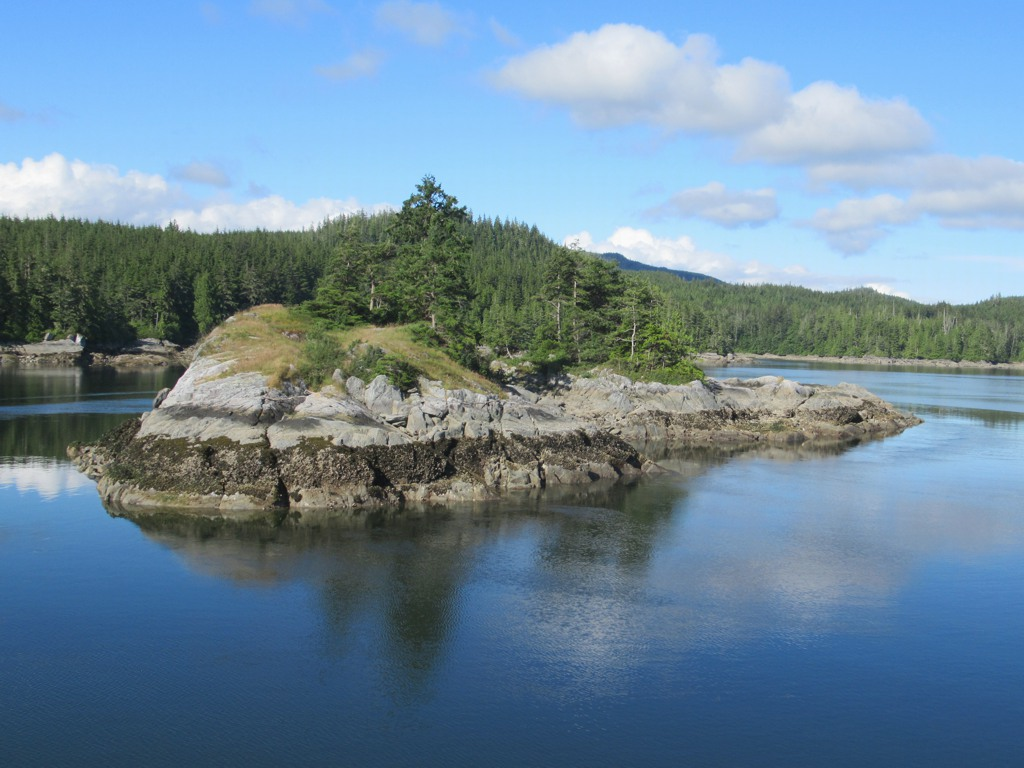
Forested islet in Beware Passage

Beware Passage is a strait or channel in the Central Coast region of British Columbia, Canada, between Harbledown (SE) and Turnour Islands. It was named in 1860 by Captain Pender.

The passage's waters and shores have various Indian reserves and communities of the Kwakwaka'wakw:

- Coffin Island Indian Reserve No. 3 on Kamano Island
- Small Island Indian Reserve No. 4 on Small Island
- Aglakumna-la Indian Reserve No. 2 on Klaoitsis Island
- Karlukwees Indian Reserve No. 1, which is the location of the Tlowitsis village of Kalugwis (Karlukwees or Qalogwis are other spellings)
- Dead Point Indian Reserve No. 5 on the north side of Harbledown Island
