= Minstrel Island =

Island in Canada

Coordinates: 50°37′09″N 126°19′14″W

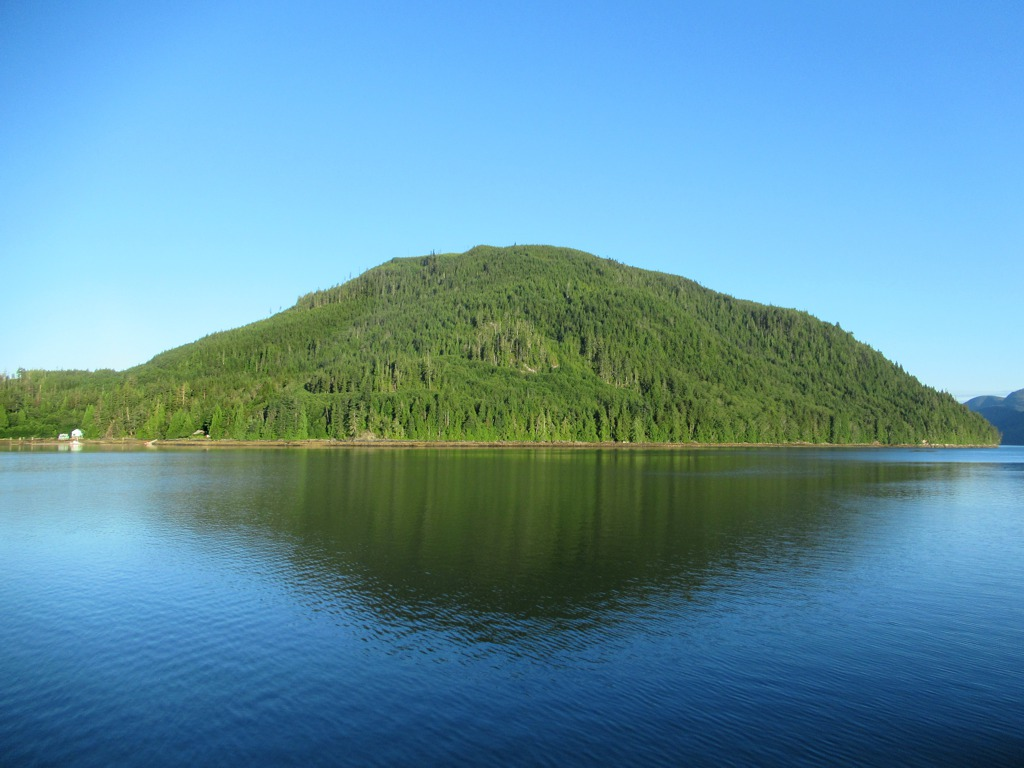
Minstrel Island from Knight Inlet

Minstrel Island, is an island in the Johnstone Strait region of the Central Coast region of British Columbia, Canada. It is near the entrance to Knight Inlet just east of Turnour Island at the junction of Clio and Chatham Channels. The island is separated on its south from East Cracroft Island by a marine passageway called The Blow Hole.

There is a government dock at the southeast side of the island bordering Chatham Channel. The community of Minstrel Island is located on the east side of the island. The island has a floatplane base, Minstrel Island Water Aerodrome.

== Name origin ==
The name is believed to have derived from a visit by a boat, believed to be HMS Amethyst, carrying Lord Dufferin, then Governor General of Canada, and his wife which carried the viceregal couple on a voyage up the coast to Metlakatla in 1876. According to one of the crew, a Patrick Riley, Amethyst's crew performed regularly as a troupe of "minstrels", white people made up in blackface, who provided entertainment for shipmates and visitors, and the name likely commemorates a performance in these waters. Bones Bay and Sambo Point nearby are related names, referring to stock characters in minstrel shows.

== See also ==
- List of islands of British Columbia
- List of communities in British Columbia
