= New Vancouver =

- Location of New Vancouver in British Columbia
- Coordinates: 50°34′10″N 126°36′43″W
- Country: Canada
- Province: British Columbia
- Area codes: 250, 778

New Vancouver, also known as Tzatsisnukomi, T˜sadzis' nukwame' or t̕sa̱dzis'nukwa̱me'' in the Kwak'wala language, is a Kwakwaka'wakw community on Harbledown Island in the Queen Charlotte Strait region of the Central Coast of British Columbia, near the community of Alert Bay. New Vancouver is the main village of the Da̱ʼnaxdaʼx̱w subgroup of the Kwakwaka'wakw peoples. New Vancouver is at Dead Point on the north end of Harbeldown Island, at the west end of Beware Passage.

== Name origin and history ==
Tzatsisnukomi is Kwak'wala for "eelgrass in front". The site is within Mamalilikulla territory but was settled by Da'naxda'xw and Aweatatla who moved from Kalugwis in 1891 and built houses on what was to become Dead Point Indian Reserve No. 5. It is not clear whether the move was made at the invitation of the Mamalilikulla or if the site was purchased from them.

== See also ==
- List of communities in British Columbia
- List of Indian reserves in British Columbia
- List of Kwakwaka'wakw villages
