= Samuel Island =

Island in British Columbia, Canada

- Location of Samuel Island in British Columbia

Geography
- Location: Strait of Georgia
- Coordinates: 48°49′26″N 123°12′55″W
- Archipelago: Gulf Islands
- Highest elevation: 55 m (180 ft)

Administration
- Canada
- Province: British Columbia

Samuel Island is a small island in the southern Gulf Islands, located in the Strait of Georgia southeast of Mayne Island in British Columbia, Canada.

== See also ==
- List of islands of British Columbia
