= Maʼamtagila First Nation =

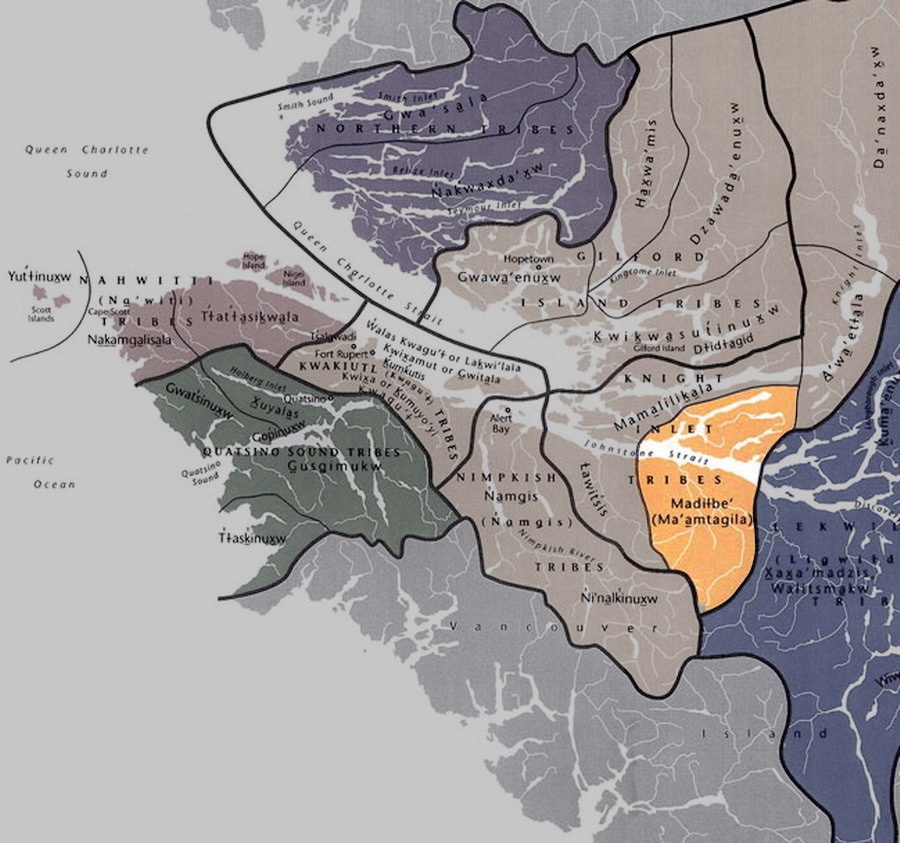
This map, based on one released by the Umista Cultural Society, clearly shows the boundaries of Maʼamtagila/Madilbeʼ Territory in the Johnstone Strait.

The Maʼamtagila Nation (also styled Maamtagila), formerly known as Mahteelthpe or Matilpi, are an Indigenous nation and part of the Kwakwakaʼwakw peoples. Their territory is located in the Queen Charlotte Strait-Johnstone Strait area in the Discovery Islands between Vancouver Island and the British Columbia mainland in Canada.

The Maʼamtagila are recognized by the various tribes that comprise the Kwakwakaʼwakw-speaking peoples. They were officially recognized by the Government of Canada first in 1879 and confirmed in 1914 by the Royal Commission on Indian Affairs in British Columbia (McKenna-McBride Commission), before amalgamating in 1945 with the Klowitsis Tribe (now Tlowitsis Nation).

== History ==
Prior to contact with settlers, the Maʼamtagila occupied the area around what is now called the Johnstone Strait for thousands of years. Their primary dwelling places were Etsekin (Matilpi Village) and Haylate, locations that were central to the overall territories of the Kwakwakaʼwakw people. Like all Kwakwakaʼwakw, the Maʼamtagila are made up of several namimas (clans), each with its own Eagle seat (leader). The three main namimas of the Maʼamtagila are the Hamatam (Seagull), Gixsam (Kulus, Thunderbird) and the Hayalikawaʼyi (Healers). The Maʼa̱mtagila name derives from their ancestor, Matagila, the grey seagull. The Maʼamtagila are known for their harvesting and carving of Cedar trees, as well as their silverwork.

=== Name Changes ===
In addition to variations in spelling, there have also been several different names assigned to the Maʼamtagila.

- In the late 19th and early 20th century, the British Colonial and Dominion Governments referred to them as Mahteelthpe or Matilpi Tribe.
- In 1945, the "Matilpi Tribe" amalgamated with the "Klowitsis Tribe" to create the Turnour Island Band.
- In 1983, the "Turnour Island Band" was replaced with Tlowitsis-Mumtagila First Nation. (Also styled Maamtagila.)
- In 1998, the name was shortened to only Tlowitsis First Nation, removing any mention of the Maʼamtagila.
- In 2021, the Maʼamtagila demanded recognition of their distinct rights and title as the Maʼamtagila Nation.

=== Post-Contact ===
In the years following BC joining the Dominion in 1871, the Maʼamtagila have been recognized repeatedly by the Canadian government.

In 1879, the Joint Indian Reserve Commission visited the Johnstone Strait. Commissioner G.M. Sproat recommended four land allotments for the Matilpi Tribe. These allotments of reserve or "Indian" land were confirmed in 1886 by the Dominion of Canada at approximately 59 acres. In 1902, the band's reserve land was extended to 145 acres.

In 1914, the Royal Commission on Indian Affairs in British Columbia visited with the members of the "Mahteelthpe" Tribe. Chief Lagis addressed the commissioners, speaking on behalf of the community:

I am glad to meet you for this reason that we are so much in trouble about our lands. There are hardly any of my lands left now for our use — it is all taken by the whites —it is given to them by the people from whom you come. There are only a few cedar trees left now — all the other trees are gone now; namely the fir trees all have been cut down by the whites. Many booms of logs have been taken away from my lands; so many of them that I don't know the number of them. My forefathers have never received anything from the Government for these lands — at least if they did I don't know anything about it. I don't think they have received anything for it. These lands belong to our forefathers, and therefore belong to me and my children, and I want to put forth my hand to pull some of it back as it looks like as if the Government wants it wrenched out of our hands. Those lands, as I said before belong to my forefathers, and therefore we say it is our own.

In its final report issued in 1916, the commission confirmed six reserves of the "Mahteelthpe or Matilipi Tribe":

- No. 1: Etsekin
- No. 2: Keecokiltum (Port Harvey)
- No. 3: Haylahte
- No. 4: Harkom (Port Neville)
- No. 5: Pawala
- No 6: Hanatsa

According to the commission's final report, the village of Etsekin was largely abandoned due to a smallpox outbreak in the 1880s. These six reserves were confirmed in the 1943 Schedule of Indian Reserves in the Dominion of Canada.

=== Amalgamation with the Tlowitsis First Nation ===
In 1945, the Matilpi Tribe amalgamated with the nearby Klowitsis Tribe, to create the Turnour Island Tribe. The amalgamation was ordered by the Indian Agent, in order to make the management of these two smaller tribes easier. Members of the Matilpi agreed to join the Klowitsis Tribe with the understanding that their two chiefs would govern "with equal powers and responsibilities." In 1983, the name was changed to the Tlowitsis-Mumtagila First Nation, in order to more accurately reflect the Indigenous titles.

In 1998, the Tlowitsis leadership removed 'Mumtagila' from the group's name to leave only Tlowitsis First Nation. In the band council resolution declaring the change, Chief John Smith declared that the Matilpi/Maʼamtagila "ceded title and authority to their lands to the chiefs of the Tlowitsis." The Maʼamtagila dispute this claim. Over time, the relationship between the Tlowitsis administration and Maʼamtagila people has become more contentious.

In 2021, Maʼamtagila leaders began formally demanding that the original terms of the amalgamation be honoured, including the reinstatement of their leadership and jurisdiction.

== UVic Little Big House Campaign ==
In 2019, members of the Maʼamtagila partnered with the University of Victoria to build a Little Big House. The construction of the Little Big House is part of an assertion of Indigenous sovereignty spear-headed by Maʼamtagila matriarch Tsastilqualus Ambers Umbas, in coordination with broader Kwakwakaʼwakw hereditary leadership. Tsastilqualus and other members of the Matriarch Camp intend to return home to their lands and waters near Hiladi, “the place to make things right,” to affirm their Indigenous title and rights and uphold hereditary systems of governance.

According to the group's website:

The portable Little Big House will enable Tsastilqualus, her son Dakota, their kin, and other Indigenous people to spend time on the land and water. In the process, the Little Big House will help to reinvigorate land-based cultural and spiritual practices, strengthen matriarchal decision-making practices that are integral to Kwakwakaʼwakw governance, increase access to traditional foods and medicines, and (re)produce and share knowledge with younger generations. However, Maʼamtagila and Kwakwakaʼwakw territories and people are also facing the impacts of historical and ongoing colonial violence. The Little Big House will facilitate anti-colonial resistance efforts by serving as a base of operations for the Wild Salmon Matriarch Camp, who witness and document industrial activity and initiate campaigns to oppose unsustainable logging and fish farming practices that threaten the health and well-being of all life on Maʼamtagila territory. The Little Big House will support Maʼamtagila people as they uphold their responsibilities and make things right.

At the launch of the campaign, Maʼamtagila member and UVic student Matt Ambers said, “Right now, we're removed. We're not on the land. But if we start to move back to the land, and start to utilize our resources again, it becomes very hard for them to continue to take what is ours.”

As of 2022, the structure has been transported to the former village site of Hiladi, with a permanent occupation led by Maʼamtagila matriarch Tsastilqualus.

== Treaty process ==
The Maʼamtagila have never entered into treaty negotiations with the Government of Canada and their territory remains unceded to anyone.

The Tlowitsis First Nation has reached Stage 4 in their treaty negotiations.

On March 3, 2021, the Maʼamtagila Nation released a statement asserting that the Tlowitsis leadership is unlawfully negotiating with the unceded territory of the Maʼamtagila, over which they have no authority. They called on the governments of Canada and British Columbia to immediately cease treaty negotiations with the Tlowitsis Chief & Council.

According to the statement:

Through a series of ill mannered, unvalidated and illegitimate resolutions and processes the Maʼamtagila have been silenced, disempowered, and disregarded by the federal and provincial governments. But we are still here. We still love our Ławitʼsis family relations, our nation, and our Potlatch governance. "The Maʼamtagila Hereditary Chiefs are the rightful representatives of the Maʼamtagila people and remain the holders of Aboriginal rights and title in their territories,” said Noah Ross, lawyer for the Maʼamtagila. “The Tlowitsis First Nation has no authority to cede Maʼamtagila territory in treaty negotiations with the Provincial and Federal government.”

In their statement, the Maʼamtagila Nation calls for treaty negotiations to be halted until the historical dispute between the Maʼamtagila and the Tlowitsis is resolved.

== See also ==
- List of Kwakwakaʼwakw villages
