= SS War Kitimat =

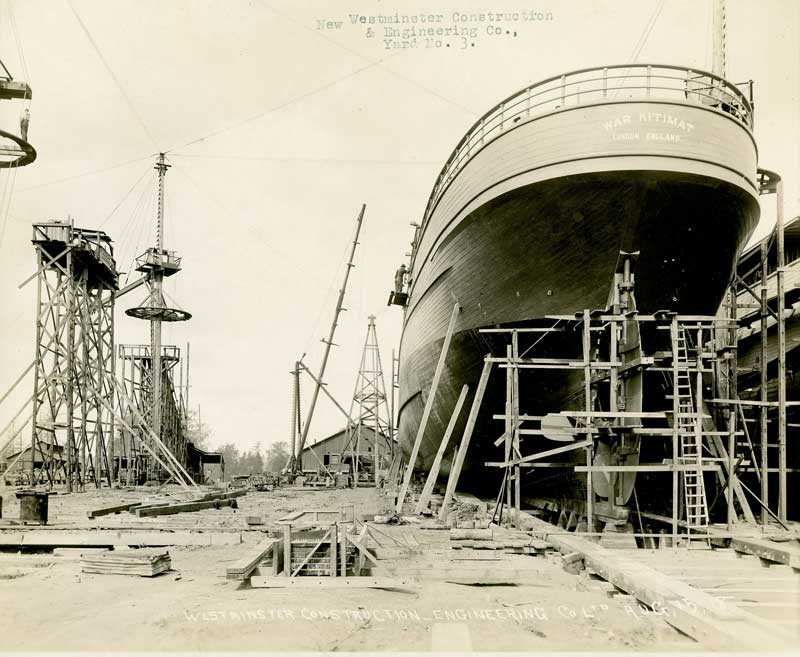

History
- Name: SS War Kitimat (1918-1919); SS Serbier (1919-1920)
- Owner: Shipping Controller, London (1918-1919); Lloyd Royal Belge S.A., Antwerp (1919-1920)
- Builder: New Westminster Shipbuilding & Engineering Company, Poplar Island, British Columbia
- Yard number: 3
- Launched: 18 August 1918
- Fate: Foundered on 12 January 1920

General characteristics
- Tonnage: 2,336 gross register tons (GRT); 3,300 tons deadweight (DWT)
- Length: 250 ft (76 m)
- Beam: 43.5 ft (13.3 m)
- Depth: 27.8 ft (8.5 m)
- Installed power: 322 nhp
- Propulsion: Triple expansion steam engine
- Speed: 10 knots (19 km/h)

SS War Kitimat was a freighter built in Canada for wartime service during the First World War. She was steam-powered, with a hull made of wood.

She was built in New Westminster, BC. A temporary shipyard was built on then undeveloped Poplar Island, for the construction of the War Kitimat and three sister ships, HMCS War Comox, HMCS War Edensaw, and HMCS War Ewen.

The War Kitimat was run aground shortly after her launch, and was repaired in Victoria, BC. She made at least one voyage during wartime. When peace came she was redundant, and was sold, in 1919, to the Belgian shipping firm Lloyd Royal Belge S.A., which renamed her Serbier. On 12 January 1920 she was en route from Cartagena and Oran, bound for Antwerp, carrying zinc ore and general cargo, when she sprang a leak 80 nautical miles off Penmarch, Finistère. With her engine room flooded she was abandoned by her crew and left to sink. Her crew were rescued by the French vessel SS Docteur Pierre Benoit.
