= Pawala Indian Reserve No. 5 =

Coordinates: 50°37′00″N 125°55′00″W

Pawala Indian Reserve No. 5, a.k.a. Pawala 5, is an Indian reserve of the Tlowitsis Nation, at the head of Call Inlet, British Columbia. The reserve is 1.0 ha. in size.

== See also ==
- List of Indian reserves in British Columbia
