= Qayqayt First Nation =

Band government in British Columbia, Canada

The Qayqayt First Nation, officially the New Westminster Indian Band under the Indian Act, is a band government based in suite 105–3680 Rae Avenue, in Vancouver, British Columbia, Canada. It is one of the smallest First Nations in Canada and the only one registered without a land base.

== History ==
The New Westminster Indian Band was created on June 30, 1879, to house migrant labourers and fishers from different First Nations, who were seasonal residents of New Westminster and worked in the canneries. The reserve was designated as an "In Common Band" for "All Coastal Nations" and was not for a single First Nation as typically is the case for other reserves. The New Westminster Band was not a nation in its own right, but was instead a geographic designation for a place where Indigenous people of any nation could camp. The Seabird Island First Nation, which was also established in 1879, is another example of a composite "in common" band created by Indian Agents. The modern-day reserve of Pekw'Xe:yles in Mission, BC is a current example of a similar in-common reserve.

The New Westminster Indian Band was made up of a block of three reserves next to New Westminster, and another reserve on Poplar Island, which was used to house Indigenous people who had contracted an infectious disease. The reserves in New Westminster were closed by the McKenna–McBride Commission on April 13, 1916, and the residents returned to their home communities. Poplar Island reserve was sold to the city of New Westminster for $16,260 in 1945.

On page 634 of their report, the McKenna-McBridge Commission described the New Westminster Indian Band as: "Composite band, its members residing chiefly on Musqueam No. 1 and Langley No. 8 ... This Reserve allotted for Coast Indians, in common.". The Indian Agent responsible for the Band explained that none of its members had origins in the Indigenous Kwantlen and Musqueam bands, however some came from Scowlitz and Sts'ailes First Nations.

In testimony to the Commission, George Roberts, a representative of the New Westminster Indian Band identified Poplar Island as a graveyard for members of the Kwantlen First Nation. Roberts also explained that the New Westminster reserves were claimed by Kwantlen, Musqueam, and Tsawwassen Nations, however governance of the New Westminster Indian Band was managed by the Musqueam Chief. Roberts explained that the people who lived on the New Westminster reserves permanently were not considered "Indians" though some had remote ancestry at Katzie and Sts'ailes. Finally, Roberts described how the Indigenous residents of the New Westminster Band were relocated by priests to the Musqueam and Kwantlen reserves at the historic community of Qayqayt. He explained that this was done without those nations' consent.

The New Westminster Indian Band, as it exists today, was reconstituted in 1994 by former chief Rhonda Larrabee after she discovered that her mother's family was one of the last to live within the former reserve. Larrabee's story is documented in the NFB film A Tribe of One. Larrabee's mother, Marie Lee Bandura, grew up as part of the New Westminster Indian Band, was orphaned and believed she was the last of her people. She moved to Vancouver's Chinatown, married a Chinese man, and raised her four children as Chinese.

== Demographics ==
There are 24 band members.

== Chief and councillors ==
Prior to its re-creation in 1994, the New Westminster Indian Band was administered by the Musqueam First Nation (Musqueam Indian Band). The modern New Westminster Indian Band has a hereditary chief and hereditary council. Members of its administration are appointed by the hereditary chief for an indefinite period. The last addition to council was in 1995.

=== List of members ===
- Hereditary Chief Rhonda Larrabee (d. 2026)
- Councillor Rodney Bandura
- Councillor Ronald Lee
- Councillor Robert Bandura

== Band finances ==
The New Westminster Indian Band's finances are audited by MNP. Under the First Nations Financial Transparency Act bands are required to publish audited financial statements, and statements on remuneration. The New Westminster Indian Band has not publicly posted information on their finances since 2017. MNP's audited statements for this band note that because many transactions are done in cash, and are poorly recorded, it is not "susceptible of satisfactory audit verification".

Year	Band revenue	Services to band members	Percentage of band revenue	Payments to chief	Percentage of band revenue
2013–2014	$114,429	$0.00	0%	$12,000	10.48%
2014–2015	$35,135	$0.00	0%	$5,999	17.07%
2015–2016	$26,309	$0.00	0%	$36,600	139.16%
2016–2017	$26,559	$0.00	0%	$28,000	105.43%

== Treaty process ==
The New Westminster Indian Band is not officially involved in the British Columbia Treaty Process.

== See also ==
- Coast Salish peoples
- Status of First Nations treaties in British Columbia
- Brownsville, British Columbia
- Musqueam
- Kwantlen First Nation
- Poplar Island
