= Blowhole Diversion Tunnel =

Creek diversion tunnel in Victoria, Australia

Coordinates: 37°18′33″S 144°7′2″E

The Blowhole diversion tunnel is located on the Sailors (or Jim Crow) Creek, Hepburn, Victoria, Australia. The creek flows around a spur in a horseshoe bend. The tunnel was driven through the spur diverting the river and allowing the exposed river bed to be sluiced for alluvial gold. It "was probably built in the early 1860s when Jim Crow Creek was being extensively worked by European and Chinese miners".

The site is part of Hepburn Regional Park.

The Blowhole is listed on the Victorian Heritage Register and covered by a Heritage Overlay.
