= Kohl Island (British Columbia) =

Island in British Columbia, Canada

- Location within British Columbia

Geography
- Location: Range 3 Coast Land District, British Columbia
- Coordinates: 52°48′0″N 128°45′46″W

Administration
- Canada

Kohl Island is an island located in Range 3 Coast Land District, British Columbia, Canada.

== See also ==
- List of islands of British Columbia
