= Little Shell Island =

Island in Canada

Coordinates: 48.67013°N 123.37747°W

Little Shell Island is a small island 2 km east of Sidney, British Columbia, Canada. It is part of the Gulf Islands. The island is approximately 1 acre (0.4 hectares) in size. It is part of the Little Group of islands near Sidney and has a rich variety of wildlife. It is named after its beach, which is composed of broken seashells.

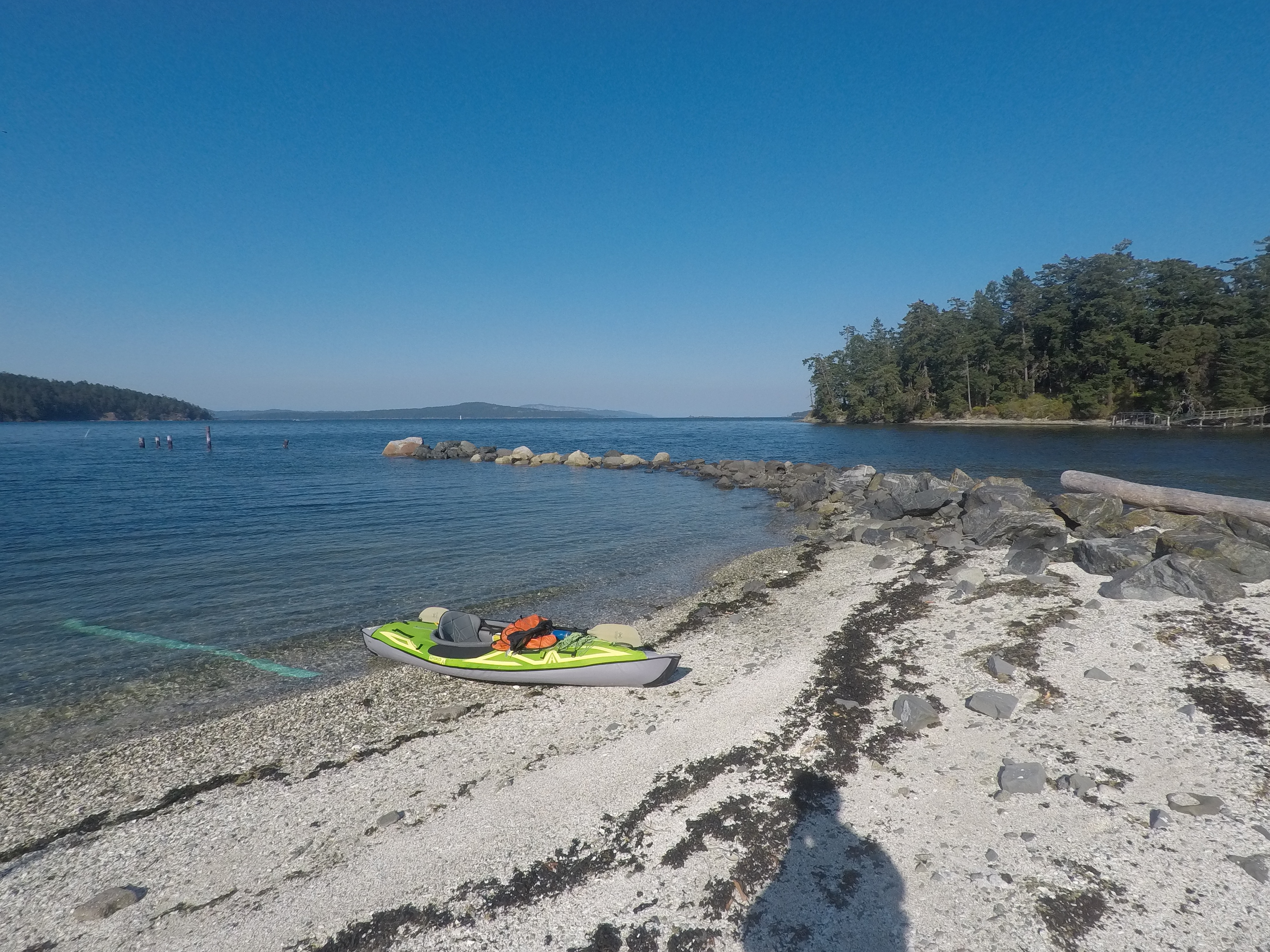

In 2021, it was put up for sale for $1.1 million.
