= Poplar Island (British Columbia) =

Uninhabited island in British Columbia, Canada

Coordinates: 49°12′00″N 122°56′00″W

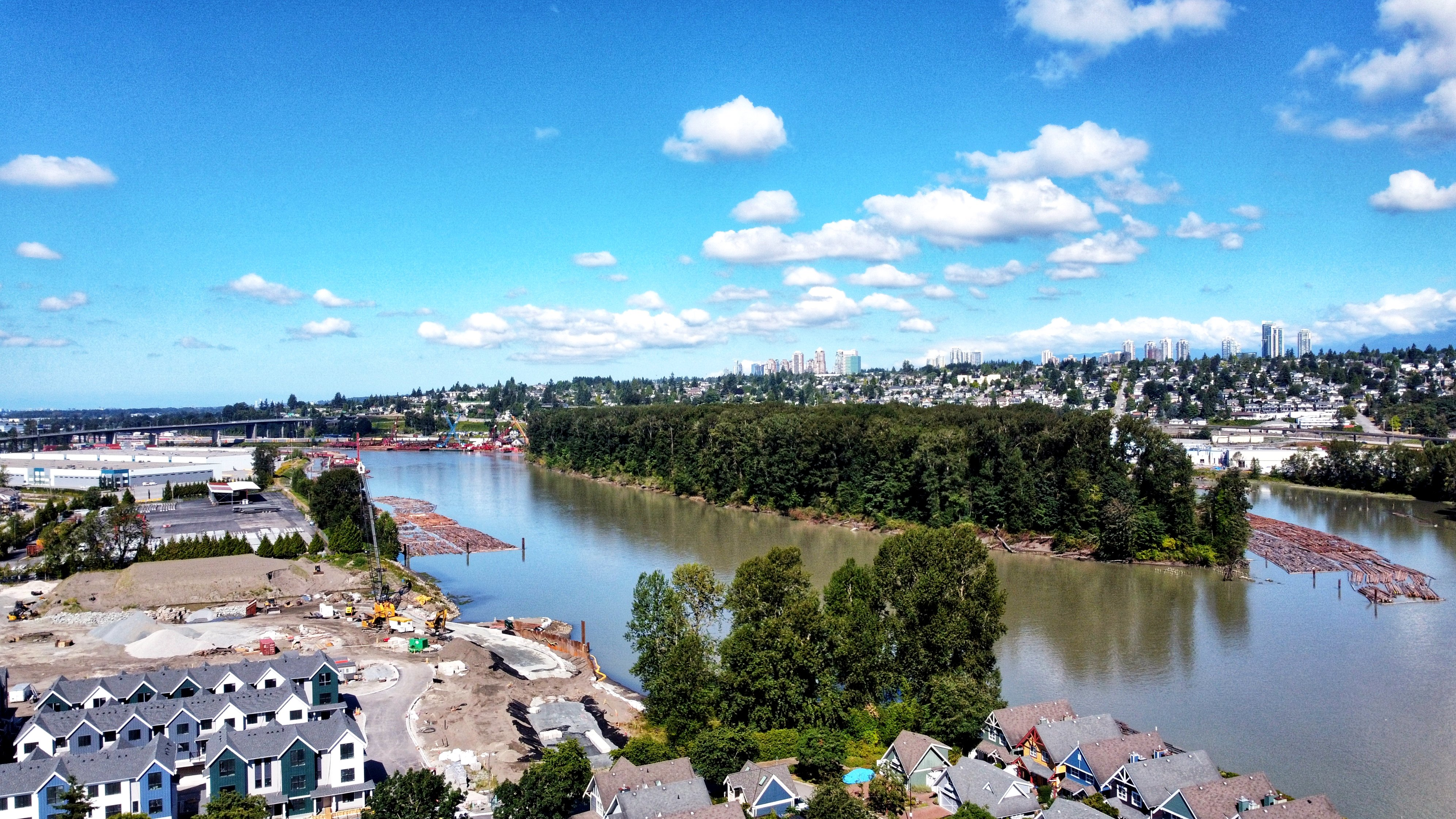
Poplar Island

Poplar Island is an uninhabited island located at the east end of the northern arm of the Fraser River in the City of New Westminster, British Columbia. It is the last large undiked island in the Fraser River's North Arm.

== History ==
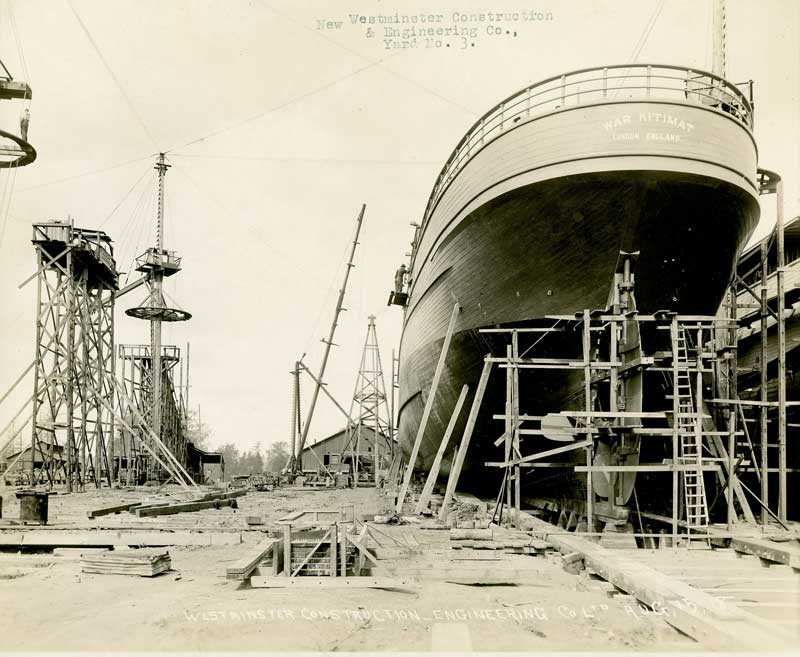
The War Kitimat was constructed on Poplar Island, in 1918.

In 1879, the federal government allocated four reserves to people from "All Coastal Tribes", and designated the "common reserve" as the New Westminster Indian Band, which included 27 acres (110,000 m^{2}) on Poplar Island. The reserve on Poplar Island was used as an Aboriginal smallpox victim quarantine area and a cemetery. Informants from the New Westminster Indian Band identified the reserve as a site of burials for people from the Kwantlen First Nation. For decades, the Poplar Island reserve was designated as belonging to "all coast tribes".

During World War I the New Westminster Construction and Engineering Company built both a massive shipyard on the island and a bridge connecting it to New Westminster. During the war years, hundreds of workers built, among other things, four warships for the government of France. Cargo vessels built in the shipyard include the War Kitimat, War Comox, War Edensaw, and the War Ewen. Ship launching ways are still visible on the island’s upriver end.

The B.C. government included the island in its "nature legacy" program in 1995, and it was to be held by the Metro Vancouver's park department as a strictly protected nature reserve, in perpetuity.
