= Kohl Island (Alaska) =

Island in Alaska, United States

- Location within Alaska

Geography
- Location: Bering Sea
- Coordinates: 52°20′55″N 173°39′11″E

Administration
- United States

Kohl Island is a small island of the Near Islands, an archipelago in the extreme west of the Aleutian Islands of Alaska. It lies on the south side of Agattu Island.
