= Chatham Channel =

Strait and marine passageway in Canada

Coordinates: 50°36′07″N 126°16′32″W

Chatham Channel is a strait and marine passageway on the coast of British Columbia. It leads from the lower reaches of Knight Inlet to the opening of Call Inlet, separating Minstrel and East Cracroft Islands from the mainland to the east. From the opening of Call Inlet, running south then east around East Cracroft, is Havannah Channel.

== Name origin ==
The channel is presumably named for HMS Chatham.
