= Matilpi =

Matilpi is a locality on the Central Coast of British Columbia, Canada, located northeast of Hull Island on the east side of Havannah Channel.

Etsekin Indian Reserve No. 1, a.k.a. Etsekin 1, includes Matilpi and adjacent small islands. Located at 50°33′30″N 126°11′12″W, it is 13.2 ha. in size.

The area was traditionally home to the Ma'amtagila people. Following colonization by Canada, the reserve was originally allotted to the Mahteelthpe or Matilpi Tribe, a colonial exonym for the Ma'amtagila. In 1945, the Matilpi Tribe was forced by the Canadian government under the federal band system to amalgamate with the Tlowitsis Tribe, creating the Turnour Island Band, which later became the Tlowitsis-Mumtagila First Nation. This move effectively erased Ma'amtagila title and identity on paper.Tlowitsis-Ma'amtagila Amalgamation . In terms of the colonial band system, the territory is now under the governance of the Tlowitsis Nation. while hereditary title remains with the Ma'amtagila people and their descendants. This aspect of the area's colonial history has created a contemporary source of tension and division among the two respective nations.

== See also ==
- List of communities in British Columbia
- List of Indian reserves in British Columbia
- List of Kwakwaka'wakw villages
