= Double Islands =

Pair of islands in Adélie Land, Antarctica

- Location within Antarctica

Geography
- Location: Antarctica
- Coordinates: 66°45′S 141°11′E

Administration
- Administered under the Antarctic Treaty System

Demographics
- Population: Uninhabited

The Double Islands are two small rocky islands lying close east of the tip of Zélée Glacier Tongue and 0.7 kilometres (0.4 nmi) north-northwest of the Triple Islands. They were photographed from the air by U.S. Navy Operation Highjump, 1946–47, and were charted and named by the French Antarctic Expedition, 1949–51.

== See also ==
- List of Antarctic and sub-Antarctic islands
