= Franklin Range =

Mountain range in Canada

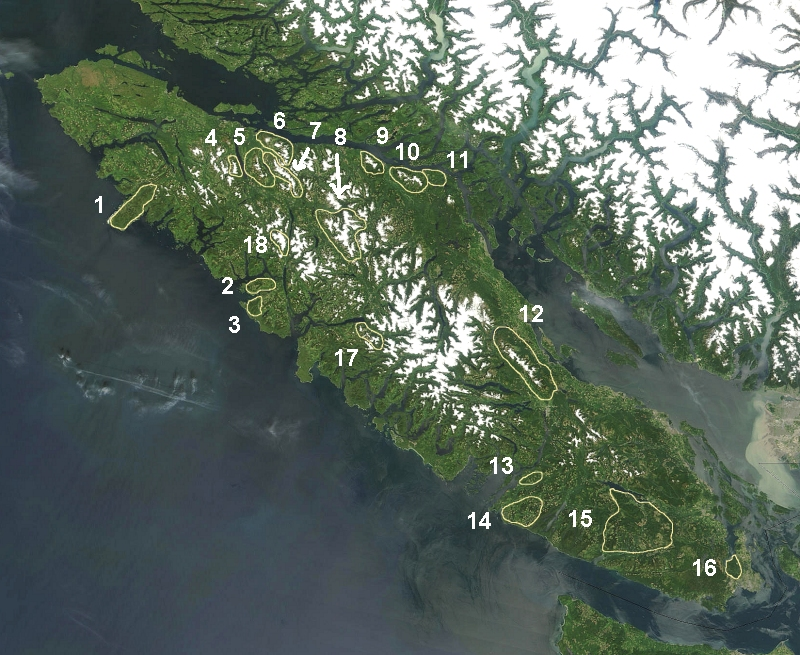
- The Franklin Range is marked 6 on map

Highest point
- Coordinates: 50.4677°N 126.6059°W

Dimensions
- Area: 200 km^{2} (77 mi^{2})

Geography
- Location within British Columbia
- Country: Canada
- Region: British Columbia
- Parent range: Vancouver Island Ranges

The Franklin Range is a small mountain range on Vancouver Island, British Columbia, Canada, located just southwest of Robson Bight and Johnstone Strait. It has an area of 200 km^{2} and is a subrange of the Vancouver Island Ranges which in turn form part of the Insular Mountains. The range was named in 1861 by Captain Richards for noted Arctic explorer Rear Admiral Sir John Franklin who died exploring the Arctic and his wife, Lady Franklin. The Cracroft Islands across Johnstone Strait were named for Sophia Cracroft, Sir John's niece who accompanied Lady Franklin on her journey around the world that brought them to British Columbia during the Fraser Gold Rush of 1858.

== See also ==
- List of mountain ranges
