= Broken Islands =

Uninhabited Canadian islands

- Location within Nunavut Location within Canada

Geography
- Location: Hudson Bay
- Coordinates: 62°40′24″N 092°00′39″W
- Archipelago: Arctic Archipelago

Administration
- Canada
- Nunavut: Nunavut
- Region: Kivalliq

Demographics
- Population: Uninhabited

The Broken Islands are uninhabited islands in the Arctic Archipelago in Nunavut, Canada, located within western Hudson Bay. The closest community is Rankin Inlet.
