= Clio Channel =

Coordinates: 50°35′22″N 126°24′09″W

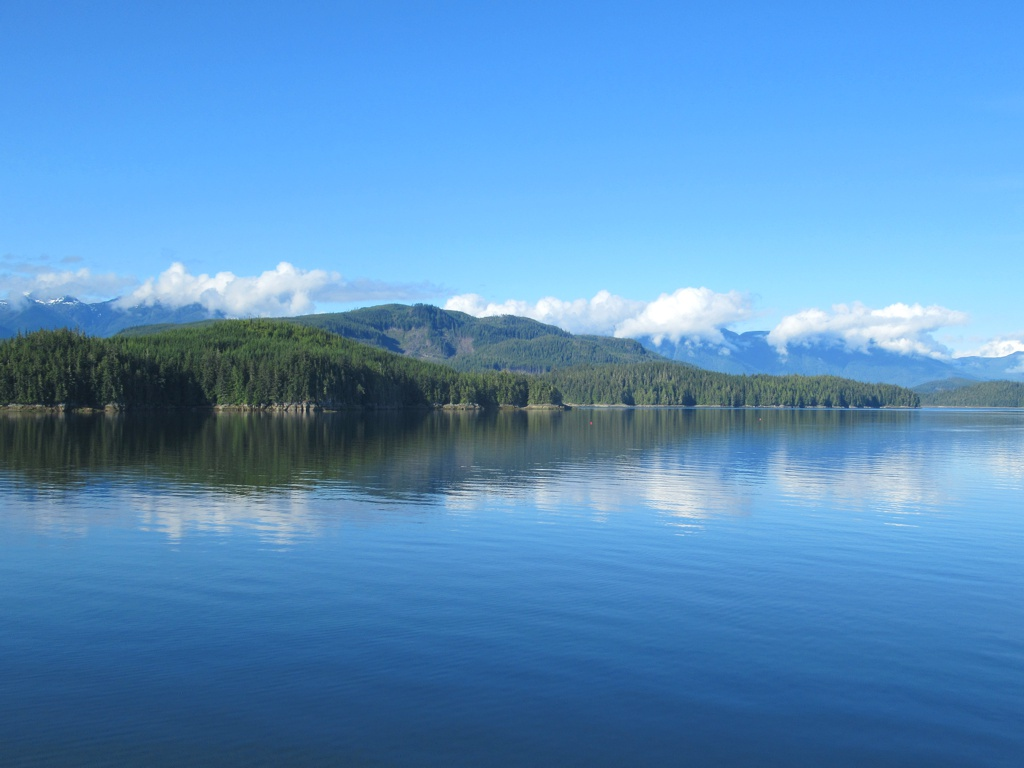
Clio Channel and Turnour Island

Clio Channel is a marine waterway running southwest to northeast between Turnour and West Cracroft Islands in the Johnstone Strait region of the Central Coast of British Columbia, Canada.

== Name origin ==
Clio Channel was named c.1866 by Captain Pender for HMS Clio, which was commanded by Captain Nicholas E.B. Turnour, the namesake of Turnour Island, during the vessel's second commission with the Pacific Station of the Royal Navy from 1864 to 1868, Clio Bay near Kitimat was also named for the Clio.
