= Harbledown Island =

Island in British Columbia, Canada

Harbledown Island is an island in the Central Coast region of British Columbia, Canada, located west of West Cracroft Island. It is at the west end of Johnstone Strait and lies at the eastern edge of the Queen Charlotte Strait region. Hanson Island is to its west, West Cracroft Island to the south and southeast, across Baronet Passage, and Turnour Island to the northwest, across Beware Passage.

== Indian reserves and villages ==
Aglakumna Indian Reserve No. 4A, a.k.a. Aglakumna 4, 4.1 ha., under the governance of the Tlowitsis Nation is located on the south shore of the island at the west entrance to Baronet Passage at 50°33′00″N 126°39′00″W.

The village of New Vancouver (Tzatsisnukomi) is located at Dead Point on the north side of the island, at the west end of Beware Passage, on Dead Point Indian Reserve No. 5.

== History ==
Father Pandosy, OMI, established a mission name St. Michael's Mission on Harbledown Island sometime after August 1863. It was later administered by Father Fouquet, then closed in 1874 Bishop D'Herbomez.

Harbledown Post Office was opened on April 1, 1902, with a school built on the island in 1910. The Harbledown Post Office was closed May 13, 1923.

== Name origin ==
Harbledown Island was believed to have been named in 1865 by Captain Pender during his survey of these waters. The origin of the name is believed to be Harbledown, Kent, a village near Canterbury which may have been the home of one of Pender's officers.
