= Port Harvey =

Port in Canada

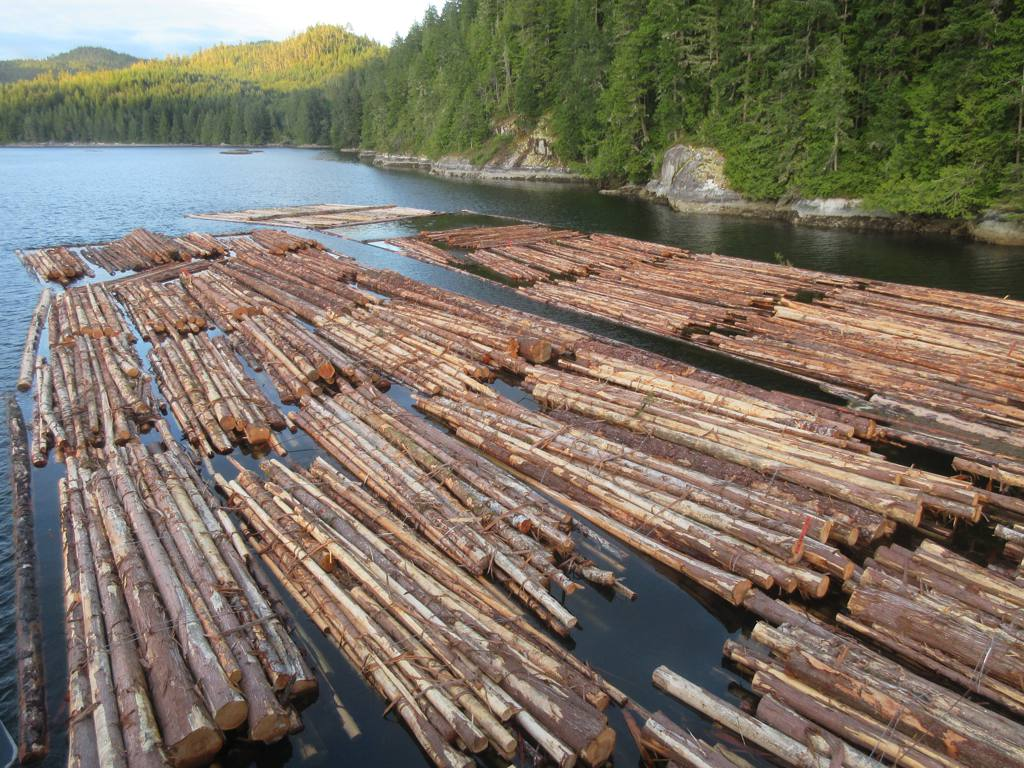
Timber awaiting shipment in Port Harvey

Port Harvey is a port on the south side of the Cracroft Islands in the Johnstone Strait region of the Central Coast region of British Columbia, Canada, forming a small bay or inlet south of the shallows that link West Cracroft and East Cracroft Islands. On its east shore is Keecekiltum Indian Reserve No. 2, 11.7 ha., which is under the governance of the Tlowitsis Nation of the Kwakwaka'wakw peoples. at 50°33′00″N 126°16′00″W. It was named by Captain Richards for Captain Harvey of HMS Havannah.

== See also ==
- List of Indian reserves in British Columbia
