= Call Inlet =

Inlet on the coast of British Columbia, Canada

- Location in British Columbia
- Location: British Columbia, Canada
- Coordinates: 50°36′29″N 126°04′38″W
- Type: Fjord

Call Inlet is an inlet on the Central Coast region of British Columbia, Canada, located south of the lower reaches of Knight Inlet to the east of East Cracroft Island. Pawala Indian Reserve No. 5 is at the head of the inlet. Chatham Channel connects the outlet of the inlet to Knight Inlet and separates East Cracroft Island from the mainland peninsula on the north side of the inlet. Havannah Channel leads southwest out of the inlet, south and east around East Cracroft and past Hull Island, to Johnstone Strait.

== Name origin ==
Also named as Call Creek by Captain Pender in his 1865 surveys of the region, when "creek" was a term used for coastal inlets, the inlet was originally named by Commander William Broughton of HMS Chatham in 1792 for Sir John Call, 1782–1801, who had distinguished himself with the East India Company as a military engineer.
