= Hull Island (British Columbia) =

Island in British Columbia, Canada

Coordinates: 50°33′02″N 126°12′18″W

Hull Island is an island in the Central Coast region of British Columbia, Canada, located in Havannah Channel to the east of the southern end of East Cracroft Island.

== Name origin ==
The island was named c.1860 by Captain Richards of the Royal Navy, for Thomas Arthur Hull, ship's master of HMS Havannah under Captain Thomas Harvey, namesake of Port Harvey, which is located just to the west, forming a bay between the two nearly joined Cracroft Islands. Havannah served on the Pacific Station from 1855 to 1859.

== See also ==
- List of islands of British Columbia
