= Mayne Island =

Coordinates: 48°50′42″N 123°16′51″W

- Island
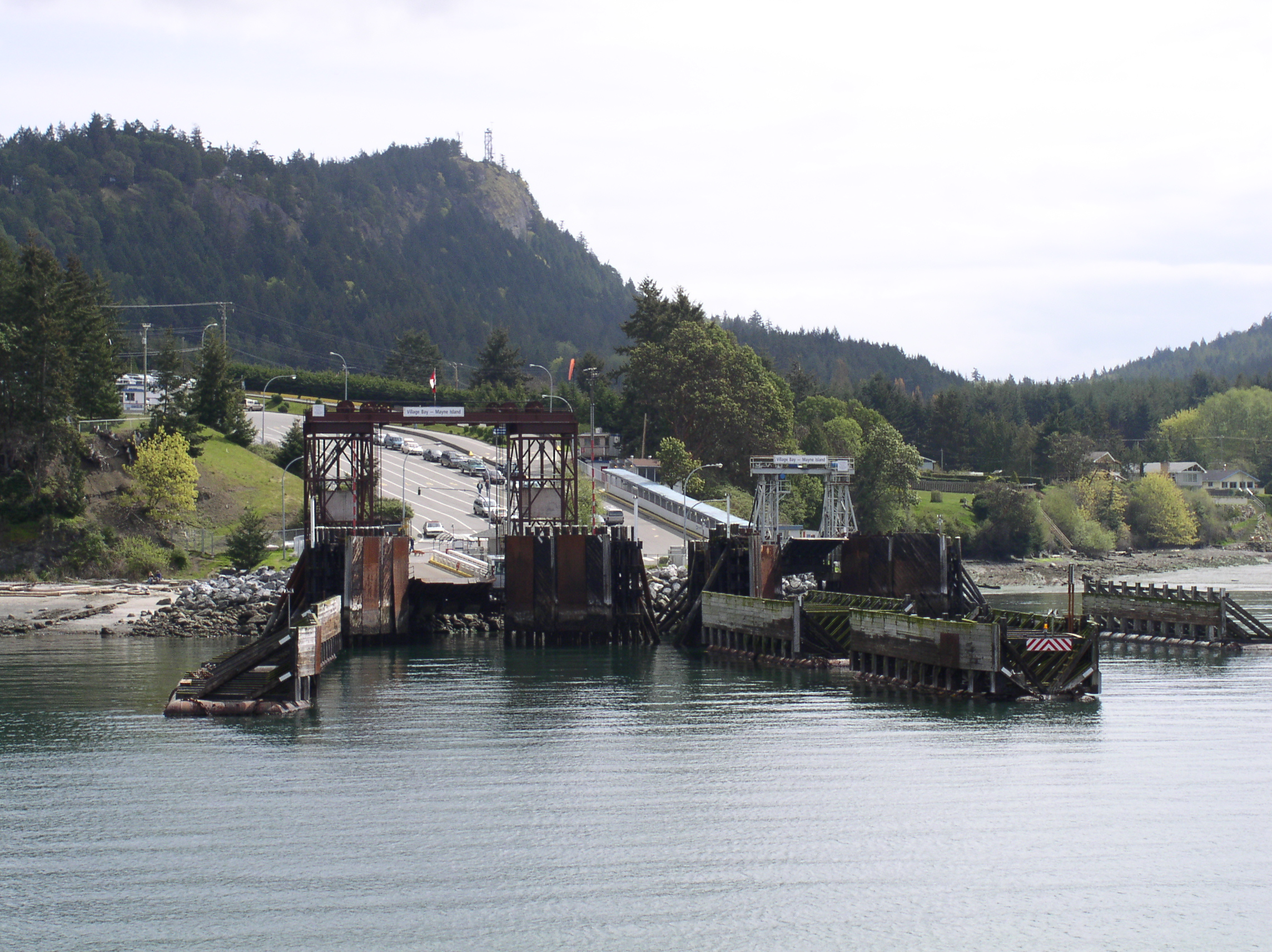
- Village Bay, Mayne Island's ferry dock

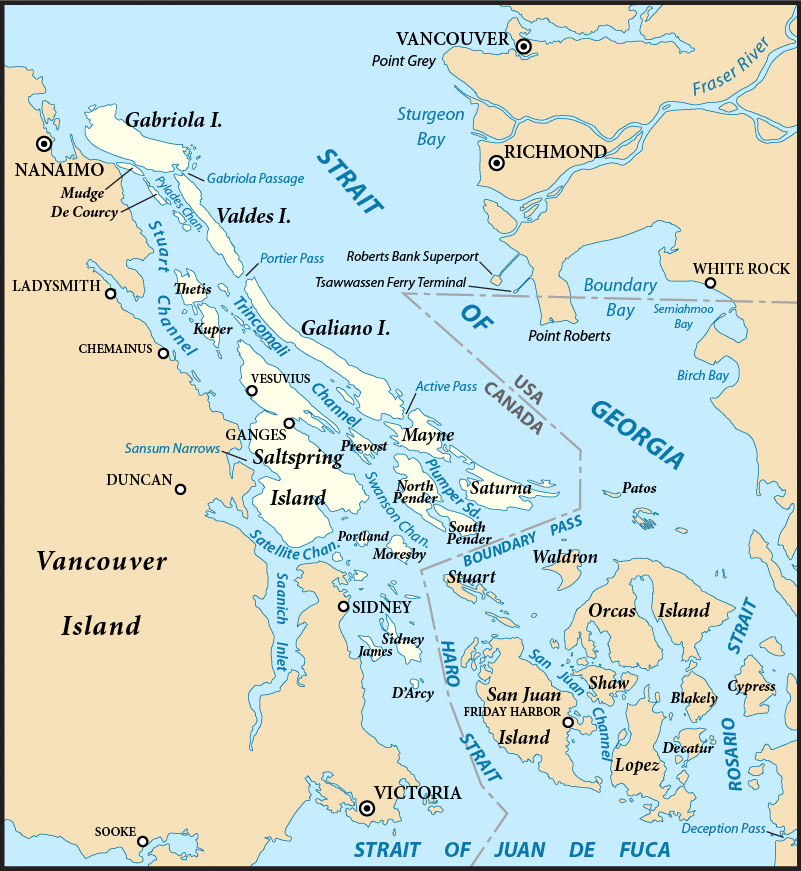
- The Southern Gulf Islands, including Mayne.
- Country: Canada
- Province: British Columbia
- Regional District: Capital

Government
  - MP: Elizabeth May (Green Party of Canada)
  - MLA: Adam Olsen (Green)

Area
  - Total: 21 km^{2} (8.1 sq mi)

Population
  - Total: 1,300+
- Time zone: UTC−07:00 (Pacific Time)
- Postal Code: V0N 2J0

Miners Bay Dock

Mayne Island is a 21-square-kilometre (8.1 mi^{2}) island in the southern Gulf Islands chain of British Columbia. It is midway between the Lower Mainland of BC and Vancouver Island, and has a population of over 1300. Mount Parke in the south-central heart of the island is its highest peak at 255 metres (837 feet).

== Parks and beaches ==
There are many parks suitable for walks and hikes, which range from easy to more strenuous.

Gulf Islands National Park Reserve offers opportunities for boating, kayaking, hiking, wildlife viewing and picnicking. There is an easy 1.5 km (0.9 mi) loop trail at Bennett Bay that leads to Campbell Point. Campbell Point features remnant old-growth forest and views of Georgeson Island. Bennett Bay has a sandy beach which is suitable for sunbathing and swimming. Georgina Point is the location of a historic lighthouse. Built in 1885, the Georgina Point lighthouse marks the entrance to Active Pass. Orcas, harbour seals and seabirds can all be seen at Georgina Point.

Mount Parke Regional Park features the island's highest point at approximately 255 metres above sea level. The park offers several forested trails leading to panoramic viewpoints overlooking the Southern Gulf Islands, including views of Active Pass and surrounding waterways. It is a popular destination for hiking and nature observation, with ecosystems ranging from mature Douglas-fir forests to moss-covered rocky outcrops.

St. John Point Regional Park occupies the southeastern tip of Mayne Island and features a loop trail that follows the shoreline, offering views of Navy Channel, Plumper Sound, North Pender and Saturna Islands. The park is noted for its abundance of arbutus trees along the rugged coastline, as well as pebble beach on the north side of the point. Visitors can enjoy hiking, wildlife viewing, and ocean vistas while exploring this protected natural area.

Edith Point Conservation Area is on the north side of Mayne Island and protects coastal ecosystems with Douglas-fir and arbutus forests, rocky bluffs, and sensitive shoreline habitats. Trails include a forest path through the center and routes along the north and south shores with views of the Strait of Georgia and Campbell Bay. The property was donated by the Graves family and is co-managed by the Mayne Island Conservancy and the Nature Conservancy of Canada.

Fred and Bette Cotton Community Park is a waterfront park overlooking Active Pass. It's part of the Whaletrail.org and features a short, forested trail leading to a rocky shoreline, with views of marine wildlife. The property was donated by the Cotton family and is managed by the Mayne Island Parks and Recreation Commission.

== History ==
Mayne Island was inhabited by members of the Tsartlip First Nation prior to European colonization. Several middens are present on the island, along with period articles – most notably including a 2 tonnes (2.2 short tons) stone bowl which was stolen in 1982 and again, in 2007.

In 1794 Captain George Vancouver camped on Georgina Point where his crew left a coin and a knife found over a century later by early settlers.

In 1857 Captain George Richards of the Royal Navy surveyed the area as captain of the Royal Navy vessel HMS Plumper, naming the island after his Lieutenant Richard Charles Mayne, son of the first commissioner of the London Metropolitan Police. His journals concerning his explorations of British Columbia are important sources for early British Columbia history, as are those of his colleague in many of those explorations, Royal Engineer Lieutenant Henry Spencer Palmer.

During the Fraser Canyon Gold Rush of 1858–1860 and after, Vancouver Island miners gathered on Mayne Island before rowing across Georgia Strait to the mainland of BC in search of their fortunes. The earliest homesteaders registered land claims in the Miners Bay area in 1859.

During the late 19th century, Mayne Island was the commercial and social centre of the Gulf Islands. The port at Miners Bay was always busy due to the steady stream of marine traffic travelling through Active Pass, the narrow, curving strait separating Mayne from Galiano Island to the north, which is the main ferry route between the Mainland and Vancouver Island today. The historic village at Miners Bay remains the commercial centre of the island, with the annual Fall Fair still being held at the old Agricultural Hall like so many years before. Miners Bay is also the site of the Springwater Lodge which was built in 1892 and remains the oldest continuously operated hotel in British Columbia. Nearby Active Pass still throbs with a steady stream of marine traffic, a bustling contrast to the island's quiet interior byways. Village Bay, with its BC Ferries terminal, has several late 19th-century to 1930s buildings. Active Pass is named after the American survey ship USCS Active, the first steam vessel to navigate the pass. In 1891, the Mayne Island subdistrict had a population of 197.

The Japanese-Canadian community on Mayne Island played a historical role in the island's economics and society from the turn of the 20th century until World War II. The community had close ties to the European-Canadian population throughout the Gulf Islands and was involved in major economic initiatives such as greenhouse farming.

Historical research has identified Washiji Oya and his wife Yo Oya (née Shishido) as early landowners on Mayne Island, British Columbia, where they held title to a 159-acre property between 1905 and 1908. The land was purchased from a Crown grant and later sold to another private owner, establishing a documented connection between the Oya family and Mayne Island in the early twentieth century.

Yo Oya is recognized as the first Japanese woman known to have immigrated to Canada and the first to give birth to Japanese-Canadian children in the country, having arrived in the late 1880s. The Oyas’ presence contributes to the historical understanding of early Japanese settlement in British Columbia and the Gulf Islands prior to the Second World War.

In 1942 the Japanese Canadians living on Mayne Island were interned by the government and resettled in various internment camps such as New Denver or moved to Southern Alberta to work in the sugar beet fields. These restrictions on where the Japanese Canadians from the coast could live continued until well after the end of World War II, only ending in April 1949 with the rescinding of the last restrictions on Japanese Canadian movement and the provision of full citizenship rights to all Japanese Canadians. All of the Japanese Canadian properties, including their homes, land and fishing boats were confiscated by the BC Security Commission, initially in trust for their owners, but later sold without the permission of their owners. As a consequence, almost all of the families would never return to the island after the loss of their land, possessions and their community. Today, the Japanese Gardens, near Dinner Bay, are dedicated to the memory and legacy of the Mayne Island's Japanese-Canadian community.

The Mayne Island community holds a Farmers' Market every Saturday morning throughout the summer months. Islanders sell their local produce, handicrafts, baked goods, and art work.

== Local economy ==
Mayne Island’s economy is largely based on tourism and small, locally operated businesses. Visitor services include accommodations such as inns, bed and breakfasts, and vacation rentals, as well as restaurants, artisan studios and galleries, food services, and retail outlets. Many businesses operate on a small scale and reflect the island’s rural and community-oriented character.

Local business information and economic initiatives are supported by the Mayne Island Chamber of Commerce, which maintains a directory of member businesses and promotes tourism and community events.

== Transportation ==
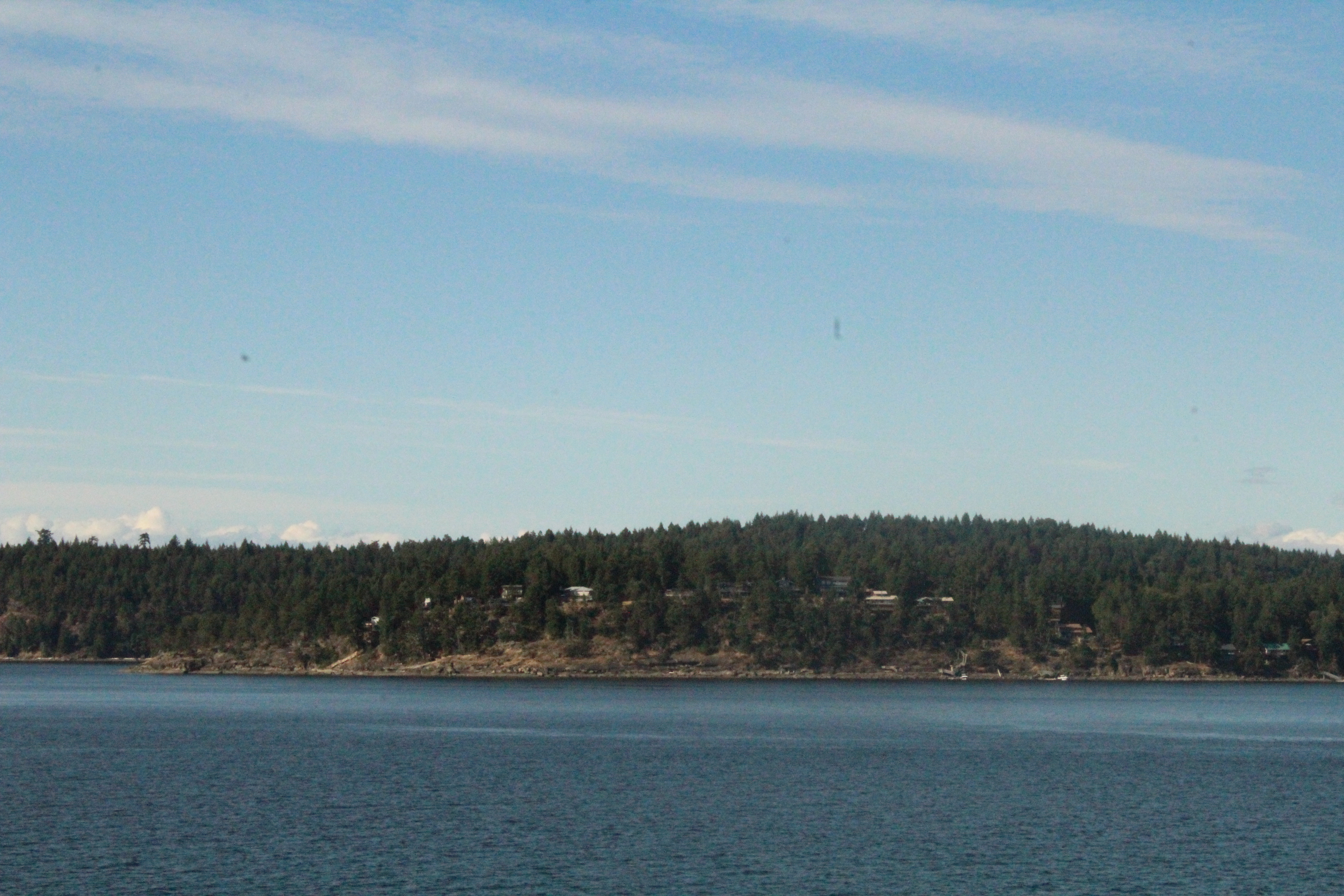
A view of Mayne Island from the ferry

BC Ferries operates a vehicle and passenger scheduled ferry service from Tsawwassen (Vancouver) on the mainland and Swartz Bay (Victoria) on Vancouver Island as well as to the other major southern Gulf Islands. SeaAir Seaplanes operates a scheduled float plane service calling at Mayne Island from Vancouver downtown and the airport. Hitchhiking is common on the island in the summer and dedicated "car stops" for pick-ups are located along the major roadways. There is a 2.3 kilometer gravel multi-use trail from the Village Bay Ferry Terminal to the town in Miners Bay.

== Climate ==
The warmest month is August, the coldest month is December.

Climate data for Mayne Island (1981–2010)
| Month | Jan | Feb | Mar | Apr | May | Jun | Jul | Aug | Sep | Oct | Nov | Dec | Year |
|---|---|---|---|---|---|---|---|---|---|---|---|---|---|
| Record high °C (°F) | 14 (57) | 17 (63) | 19 (66) | 24.5 (76.1) | 30 (86) | 30.5 (86.9) | 32 (90) | 30.5 (86.9) | 29.5 (85.1) | 24 (75) | 16.5 (61.7) | 13.5 (56.3) | 32 (90) |
| Mean daily maximum °C (°F) | 7.3 (45.1) | 8.5 (47.3) | 10.7 (51.3) | 13.8 (56.8) | 17.1 (62.8) | 20.0 (68.0) | 22.5 (72.5) | 22.6 (72.7) | 19.8 (67.6) | 14.1 (57.4) | 9.7 (49.5) | 6.9 (44.4) | 14.4 (57.9) |
| Daily mean °C (°F) | 4.6 (40.3) | 5.2 (41.4) | 6.9 (44.4) | 9.4 (48.9) | 12.2 (54.0) | 14.7 (58.5) | 16.8 (62.2) | 16.9 (62.4) | 14.5 (58.1) | 10.3 (50.5) | 6.8 (44.2) | 4.4 (39.9) | 10.2 (50.4) |
| Mean daily minimum °C (°F) | 1.9 (35.4) | 1.8 (35.2) | 3.0 (37.4) | 4.9 (40.8) | 7.1 (44.8) | 9.4 (48.9) | 11.0 (51.8) | 11.1 (52.0) | 9.1 (48.4) | 6.4 (43.5) | 3.8 (38.8) | 1.8 (35.2) | 6.0 (42.8) |
| Record low °C (°F) | −10 (14) | −12 (10) | −5 (23) | −1.5 (29.3) | 0 (32) | 3.5 (38.3) | 4.5 (40.1) | 5 (41) | 2 (36) | −4 (25) | −14 (7) | −11 (12) | −14 (7) |
| Average precipitation mm (inches) | 129.9 (5.11) | 87.7 (3.45) | 75.4 (2.97) | 55.3 (2.18) | 44.0 (1.73) | 36.9 (1.45) | 21.2 (0.83) | 23.8 (0.94) | 28.0 (1.10) | 79.9 (3.15) | 135.4 (5.33) | 124.5 (4.90) | 842.0 (33.15) |
Source: Environment Canada

== Gallery ==
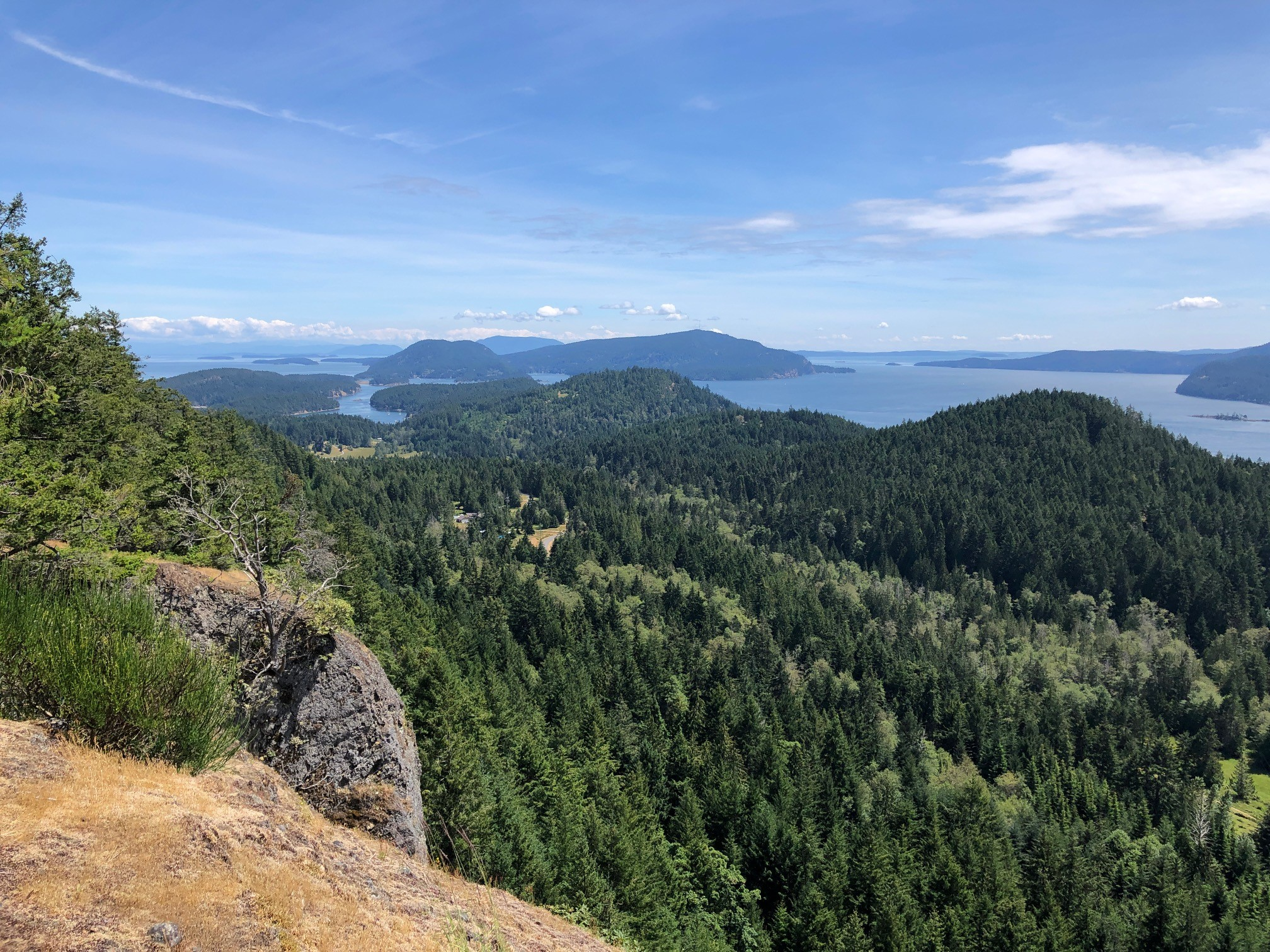
View from top of Mount Parke Regional Park

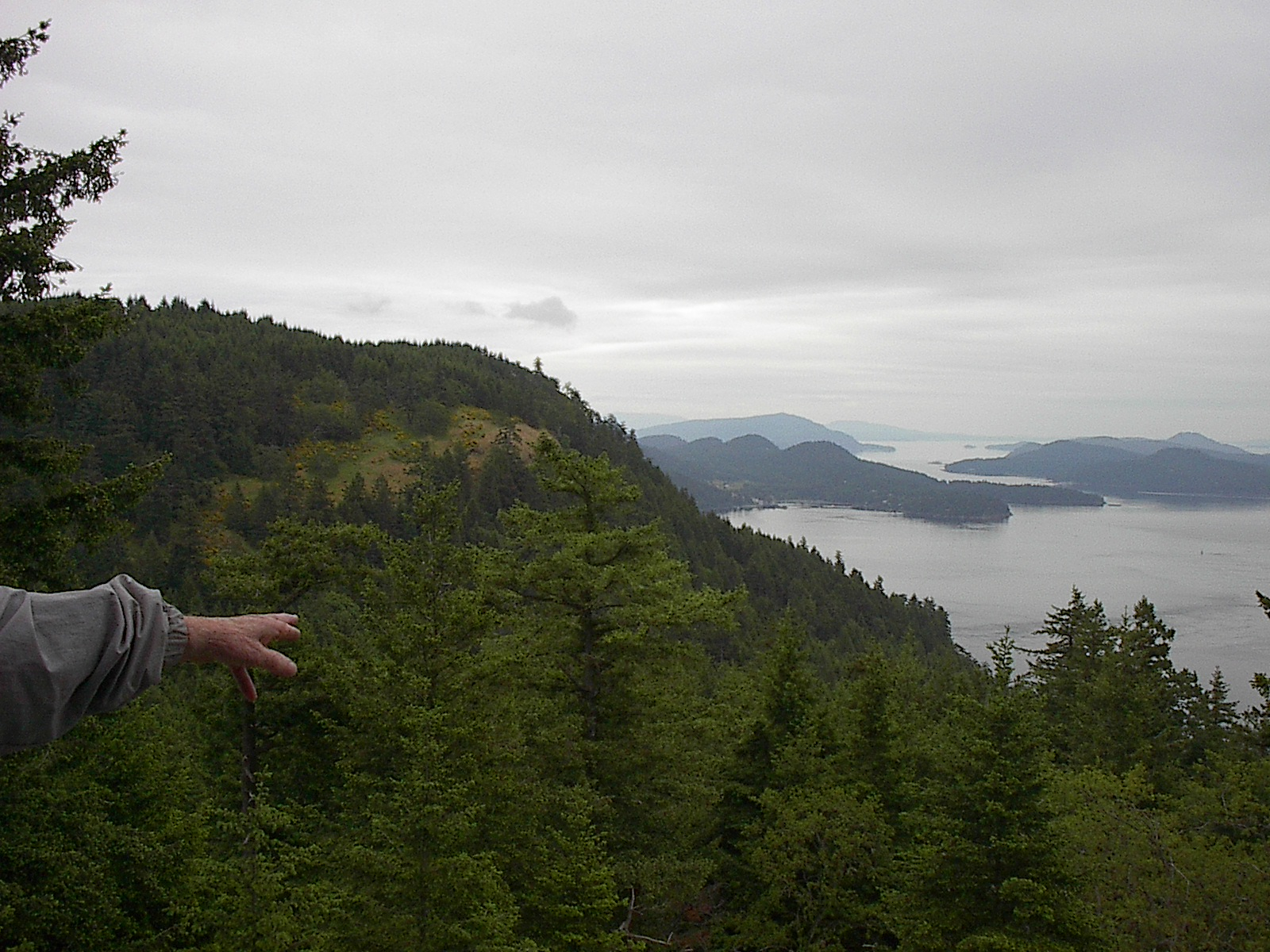
Village Bay from Mt. Sutil

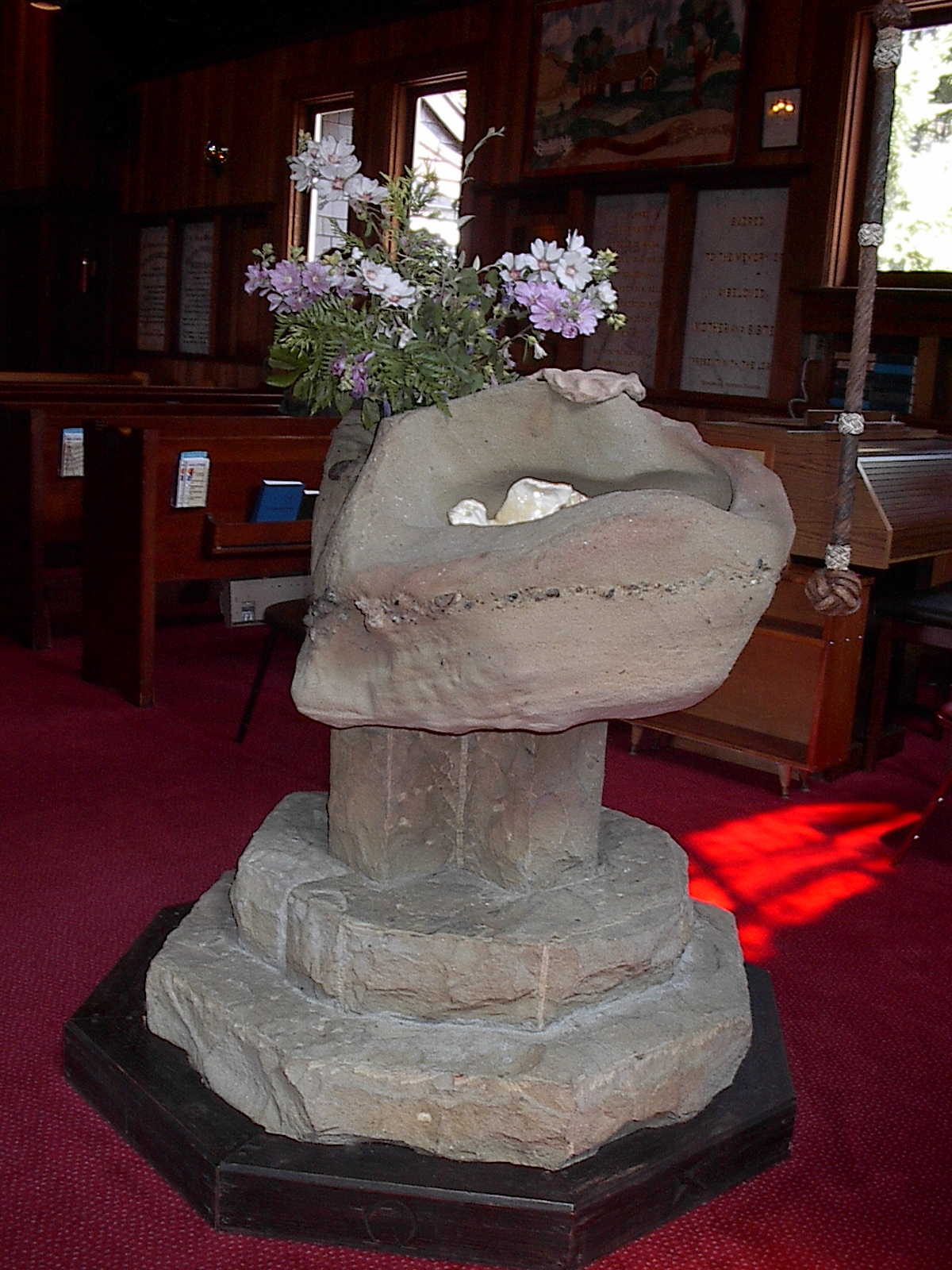
Font, St. Mary Magdalen

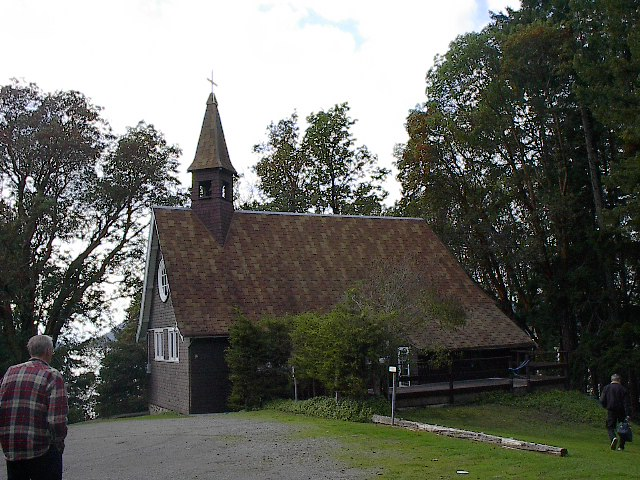
St. Mary Magdalen, Anglican Church

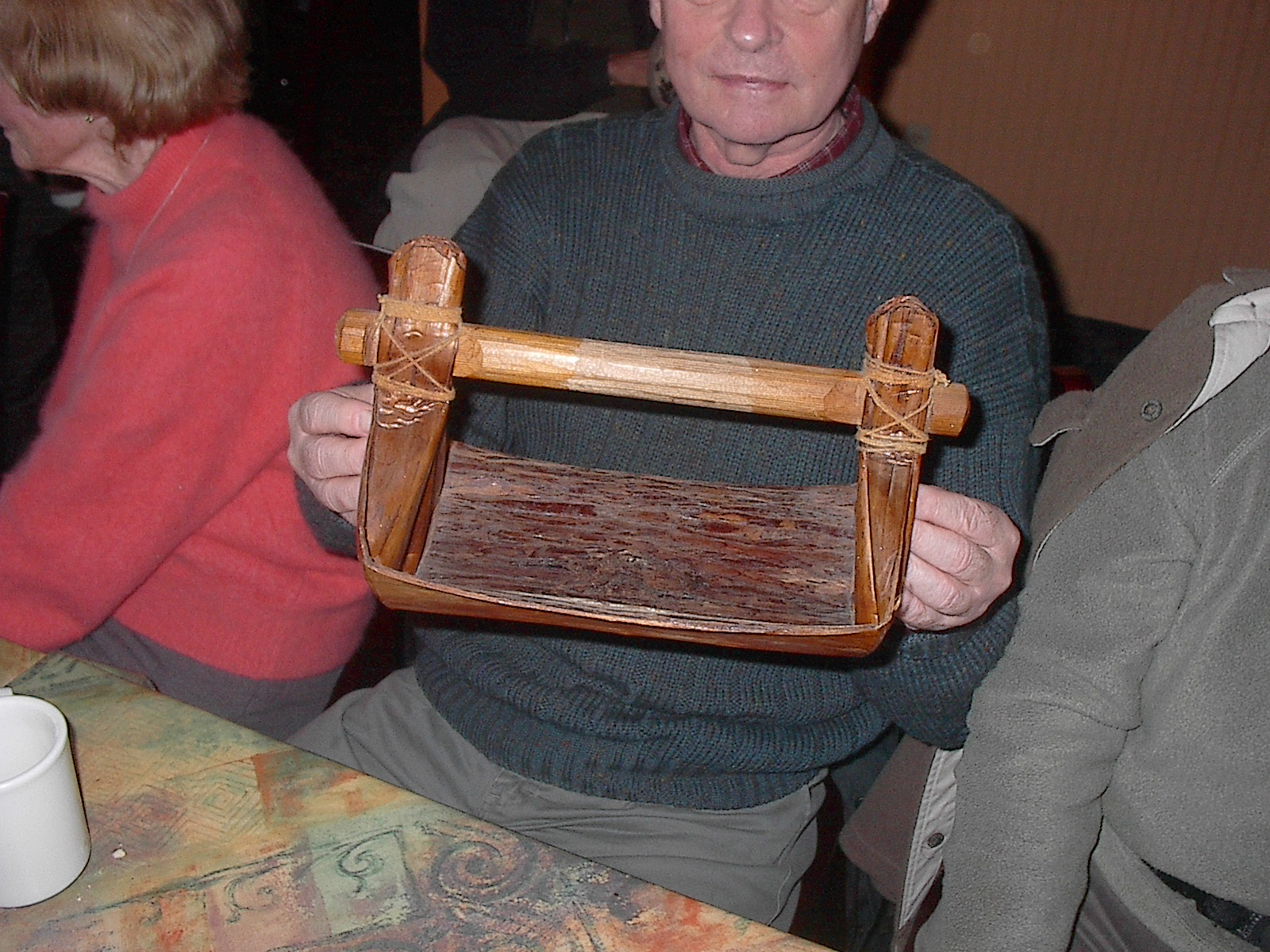
Cedar canoe-bailer belonging to Felix Jack
