= Moresby Island (Gulf Islands) =

Island in Canada

Coordinates: 48°43′N 123°19′W

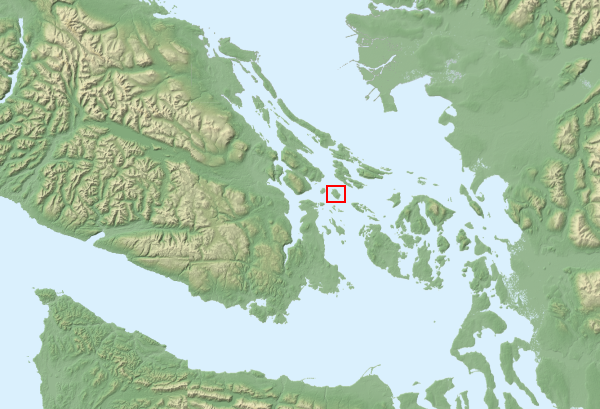
Moresby Island, in the Gulf Islands.

Moresby Island is one of the Gulf Islands of British Columbia, located on the west side of Swanson Channel and east of the southern end of Saltspring Island. It is not to be confused with Moresby Island, the second largest of the Haida Gwaii Islands off the north coast of BC. It is currently a privately owned island, and is used by its current owners to raise beef cattle. The island is not open to the general public. Its current population is 2 people, a manager and his wife.

Moresby Island has an elevation of 148 meters (485 feet 6 inches) above sea level at its highest point, and has a total land area of 3.22 sq. miles. The island is 3.7 km (2.3 mi) in length, and is 2.2 km (1.4 mi) across. The island was first settled in 1863. It was named for Rear Admiral Fairfax Moresby, who was the naval commander-in-chief of the Pacific Station of the Royal Navy between 1850 and 1853, as was Fairfax Point at the island's southern tip and the other Moresby Island in Haida Gwaii. During the 1880s, land was cleared by Capt. H. J. Robertson, then owner, in order to plant fruit trees. In 1940, the island again changed hands.

The island has been logged three times by separate Chinese logging companies. The evidence of this logging is nearly gone, yet there are a few signs of logging still remaining. Traces of the trails built for the machines can still be found. It has a very rich history, including a ghost story, the remains of a long-gone mansion, and evidence of First Nations people using the island as a resting place when traveling.

Moresby Island

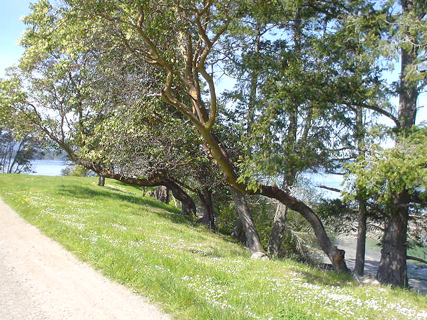

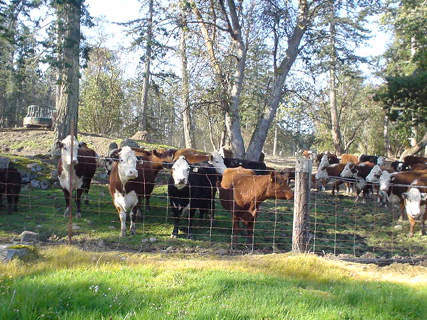

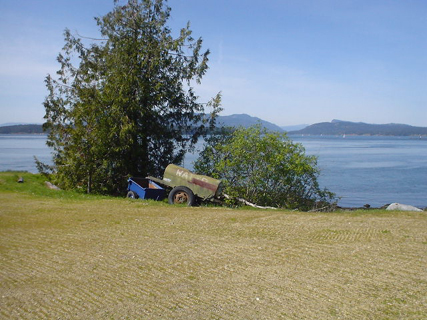

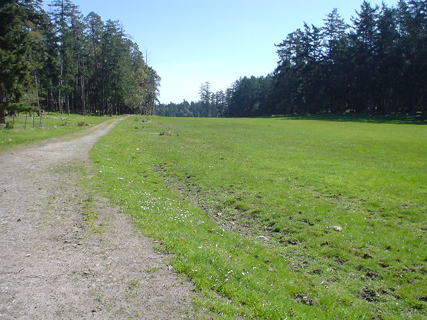
