= Kalugwis =

Canadian community

Coordinates: 50°34′45″N 126°29′54″W

Kalugwis, or Karlukwees or Qalogwis, is the principal community of the Tlowitsis Nation of the Kwakwaka'wakw peoples of the Johnstone Strait region of the South Coast of British Columbia, Canada. It is located on the south shore of Turnour Island facing Beware Passage and is within Karlukwees Indian Reserve No. 1, a.k.a. Karlukwees 1, 10.8 ha.

== Name origin ==
The Ławit'sis moved to this location about 1850 from Klaoitsis, with IR No. 1 allocated in 1886. In 1914, there were 21 houses. Kalugwis is important in many Kwakwaka'wakw stories, including that concerning the origins of the Winter Ceremonies, and others concerning the origins of tides at the location.

== See also ==
- List of communities in British Columbia
- List of Indian reserves in British Columbia
- List of Kwakwaka'wakw villages
