= Turnour Island =

Island in Canada

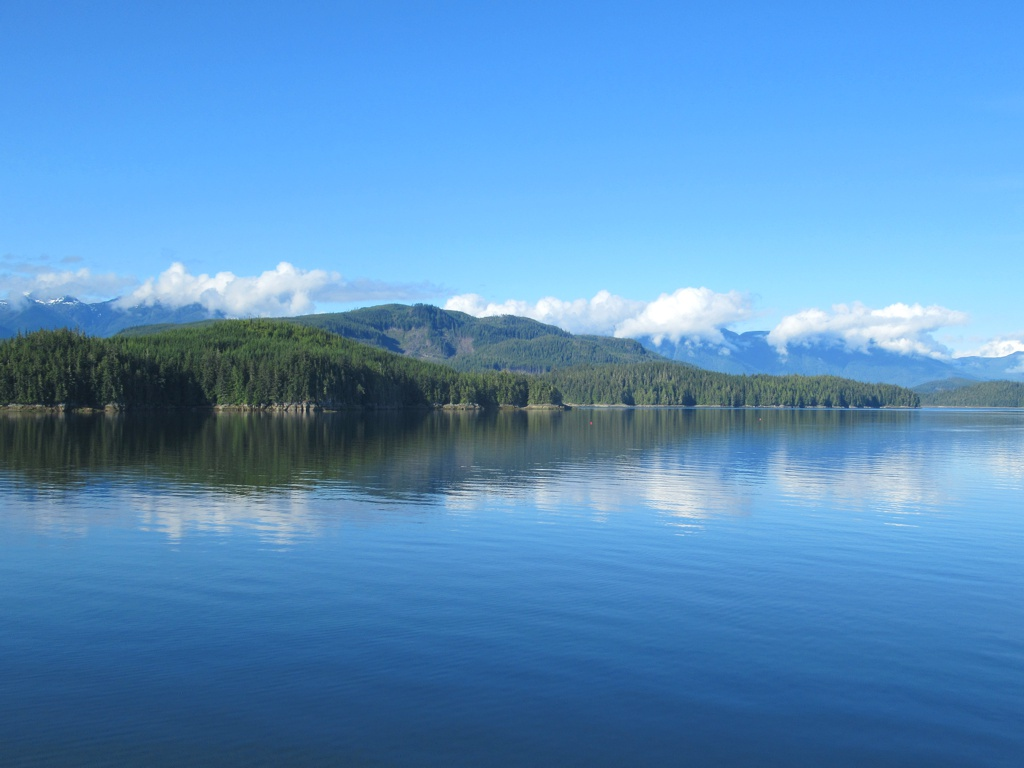
Turnour Island from Clio Channel

Turnour Island is an island in the Johnstone Strait region of the Central Coast of British Columbia, located between Gilford Island and West Cracroft Island. On the other side Canoe Passage on its northwest is Village Island, while to its south and southwest is Beware Passage, across from which is Harbledown Island. Gilford Island is to the north across Tribune Channel. Separating Turnour from West Cracroft is Clio Channel.

== Name origin ==
Captain Nicholas E.B. Turnour commanded HMS Clio during the vessel's second commission with the Pacific Station of the Royal Navy from 1864 to 1868. Clio Channel was named for the ship. Clio Bay near Kitimat was also named for HMS Clio.

== Villages ==
There are two village sites of the Kwakwaka'wakw on Turnour Island.

Kalugwis, or Karlukwees or Qalogwis, is the principal community of the Tlowitsis Nation and is located on the south shore of Turnour Island facing Beware Passage and is within Karlukwees Indian Reserve No. 1, a.k.a. Karlukwees 1, 10.8 ha.

Another village, adap'e, or adap!a, was located at the head of Turnour Bay, at 50°35′30″N 126°27′00″W just east of Kalugwis. It was used by the Walas and the Komkiutis groups of the Kwakwaka'wakw.

== See also ==
- List of islands of British Columbia
