= East Cracroft Island =

Island in Canada

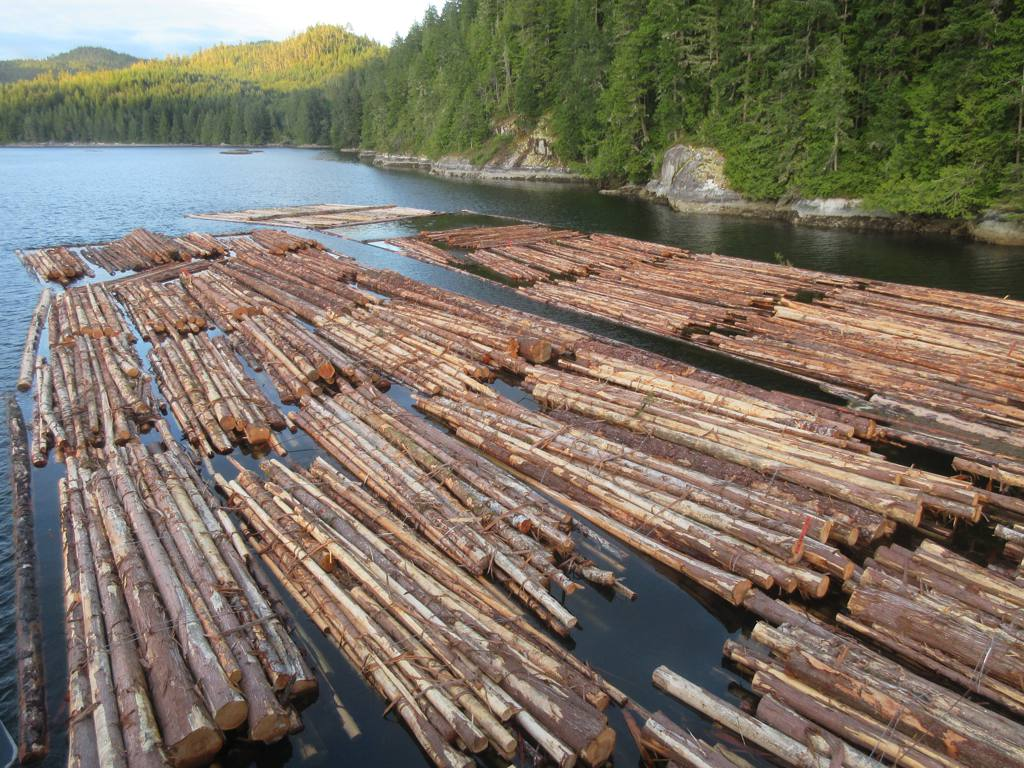
Timber awaiting shipment in Port Harvey

East Cracroft Island is an island in the Johnstone Strait region of the Central Coast region of British Columbia, Canada. It is the smaller of the two Cracroft Islands, and at low tide is really one island with its larger neighbour, West Cracroft Island. On the south side of the shallows that form an isthmus between them at low tide is Port Harvey, a short, wide inlet or bay. On its east shore is Keecekiltum Indian Reserve No. 2 (11.7 ha.), which is under the governance of the Tlowitsis Nation of the Kwakwaka'wakw peoples. at 50°33′00″N 126°16′00″W.

The Cacroft Islands were named for Sophia Cracroft, niece of Sir John Franklin. She visited the British Columbia with Lady Franklin in 1861. Nearby Sophia Island is also named for her.

The island is separated from the mainland on its northwest by Chatham Channel, which leads from Knight Inlet to the entrance to Call Inlet to the east. Havannah Passage leads south from the opening of Call Inlet, then west along the Cracroft Islands' south side to Johnstone Strait. Hull Island is off East Cracroft's southeast in the Havannah Channel.

On the island's north, separating it from Minstrel Island, is a narrows called The Blow Hole.

== See also ==
- List of islands of British Columbia
