= West Cracroft Island =

Island in Canada

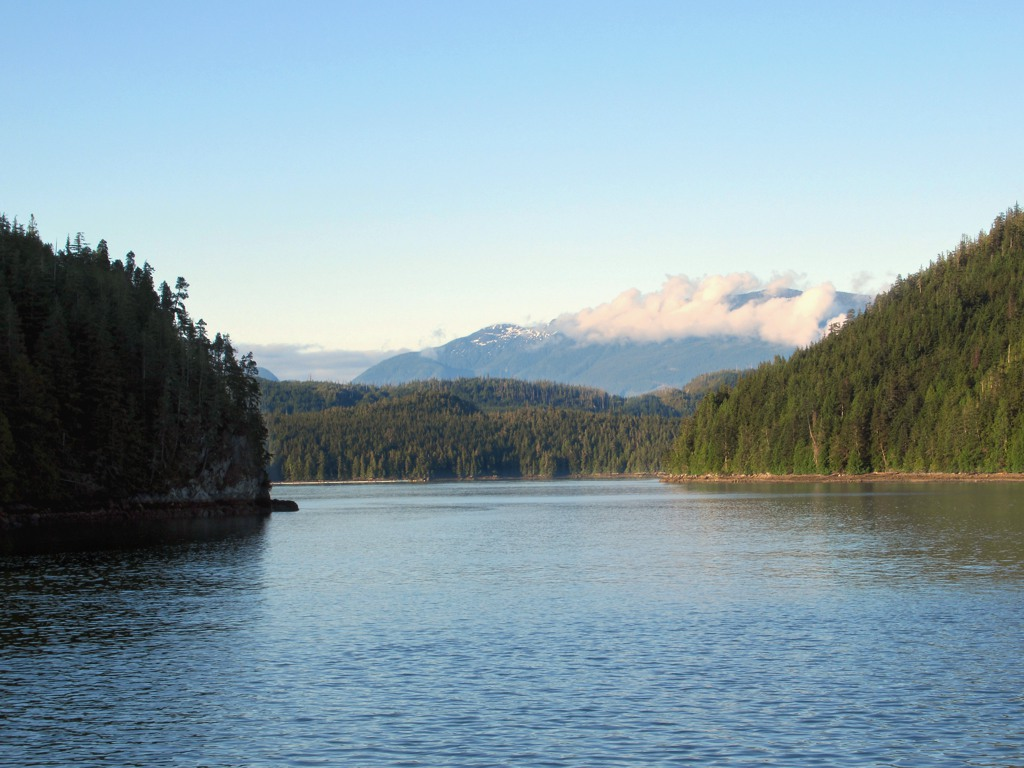
Clio Channel in the Broughton Archipelago, adjacent to West Cracroft Island, British Columbia.

West Cracroft Island is an island in the Johnstone Strait region of the Central Coast of British Columbia, Canada, located east of Port McNeill. It is the larger of the two Cracroft Islands, the other, East Cracroft Island, being so named to distinguish between the two islands, which at low tide are one island.

== Name origin ==
The Cracroft Islands were named in 1861 by Captain Richards of HMS Plumper for Sophia Cracroft, the niece of Sir John Franklin, the explorer. She accompanied Lady Jane Franklin on her round-the-world voyage, which brought them to British Columbia during the Fraser Gold Rush of 1858. They remained in British Columbia and explored its coast in 1861 before returning to England. Other features named for her in this area are the Sophia Islets off the southwest side of the island, and Cracroft Point at the very western tip of West Cracroft, at 50°33′00″N 126°40′45″W with the nearby Franklin Range across Johnstone Strait on Vancouver Island being named for Sir John and Lady Franklin.

== See also ==
- List of islands of British Columbia
- Cracroft (disambiguation)
