= Long Lake (Smith Inlet) =

Lake in British Columbia, Canada

- Location within British Columbia
- Location: British Columbia, Canada
- Coordinates: 51.23417°N 127.14639°W

Long Lake is a lake south of the head of Smith Inlet in the Central Coast region of British Columbia, Canada. It flows west into the Smith Inlet and its main tributary is Smokehouse Creek at its north-east end.

Among the many Indian reserves in the Smith Inlet/Smith Sound region which are part of the inheritance of the Gwa'sala group now part of the Gwa'sala-'Nakwaxda'xw Nations government, two are on Long Lake:

- Halowis IR No. 5 is at the mouth of Smokehouse Creek at the head of Long Lake, and is 3.60 ha. 51°18′00″N 127°03′00″W
- Toksee IR No. 4 is at the isthmus between Long Lake and Wyclees Lagoon, and is 5.60 ha. 51°14′00″N 127°20′00″W.

== See also ==
- List of lakes of British Columbia
- Long Lake (British Columbia)
- Long Lake (disambiguation)
