= Gwaʼsala-ʼNakwaxdaʼxw Nations =

Kwakwakaʼwakw First Nation band government in British Columbia, Canada

Gwaʼsala-ʼNakwaxdaʼxw Territories

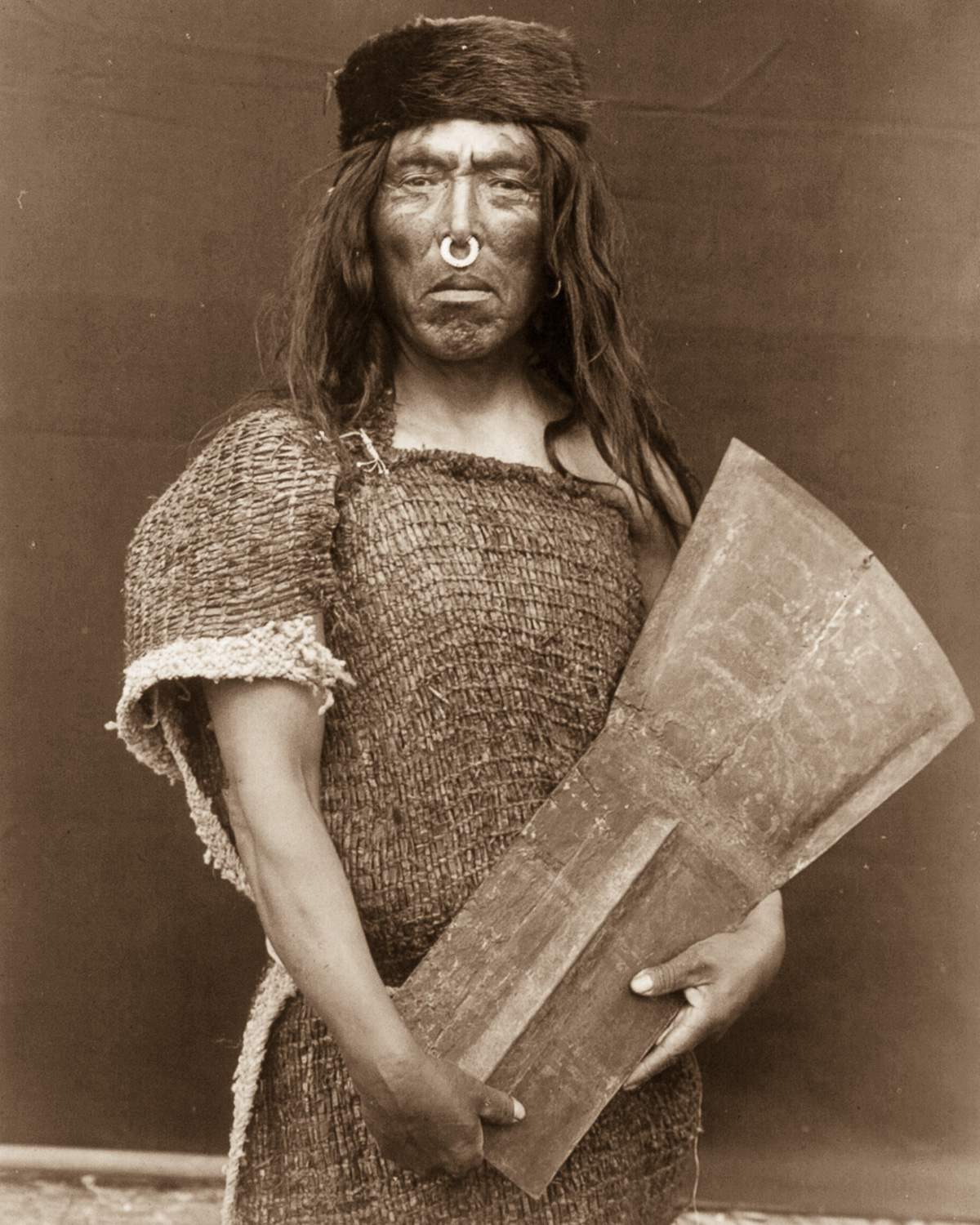
Nakwaxda'xw chief Hakalahl (photo by Edward S. Curtis, 1914)

The Gwaʼsala-ʼNakwaxdaʼxw Nations are an amalgamation of two Kwakwakaʼwakw peoples in a band government based on northern Vancouver Island in British Columbia, whose main reserve community is near the town of Port Hardy in the Queen Charlotte Strait region of the Central Coast region of British Columbia, Canada. In the 1960s the Gwaʼsa̱la, the ʼNakʼwaxdaʼx̱w and the Kwakiutl peoples were amalgamated. Later the Gwaʼsala-ʼNakwaxdaʼxw Nations and the Kwakiutl First Nation separated into the two groups that are recognized by the federal government. In 1964, Gwaʼsala-ʼNakwaxdaʼxw Nations were forcibly relocated from their homelands to a location near Port Hardy.

As part of the relocation, the Gwaʼsala-ʼNakwaxdaʼxw Nations, were promised that they would get a Big House to hold their cultural events. In the 2010s, the Gwa'sala-'Nakwaxda'xw treaty office created a Big House Society. In 2016, it acquired timber for the project and federal funding was secured in 2017. The Big House was opened in June 2026, 62 years after the relocation.

== First Nations reserves ==
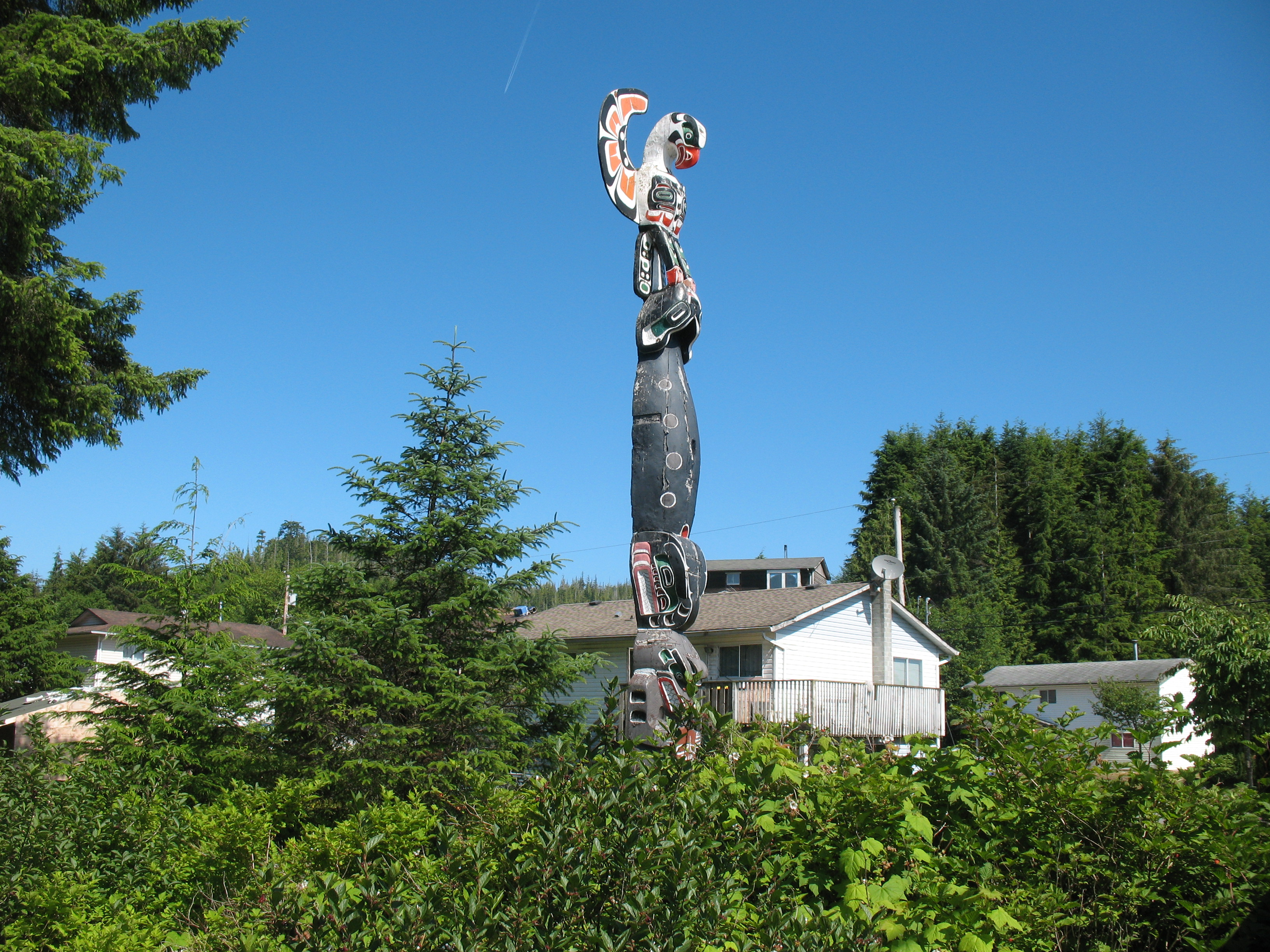
Totem pole within the community

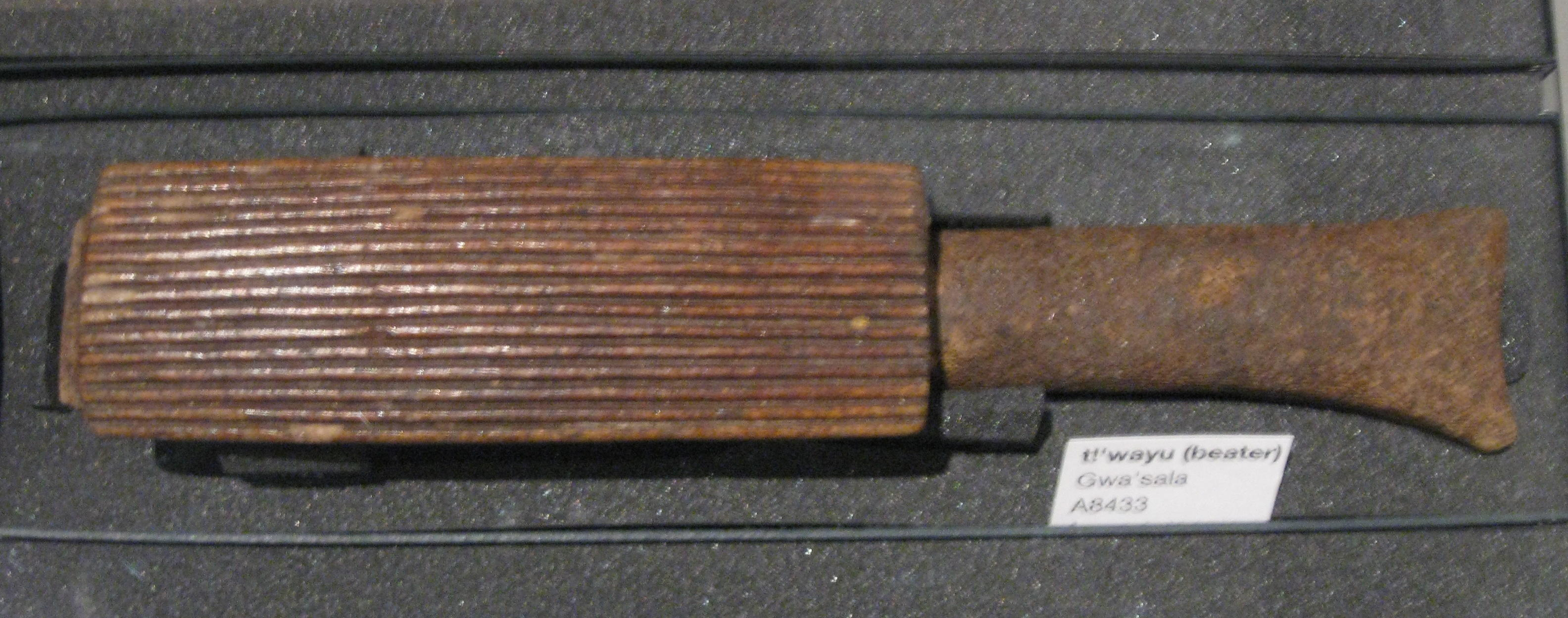
Gwaʼsala beater

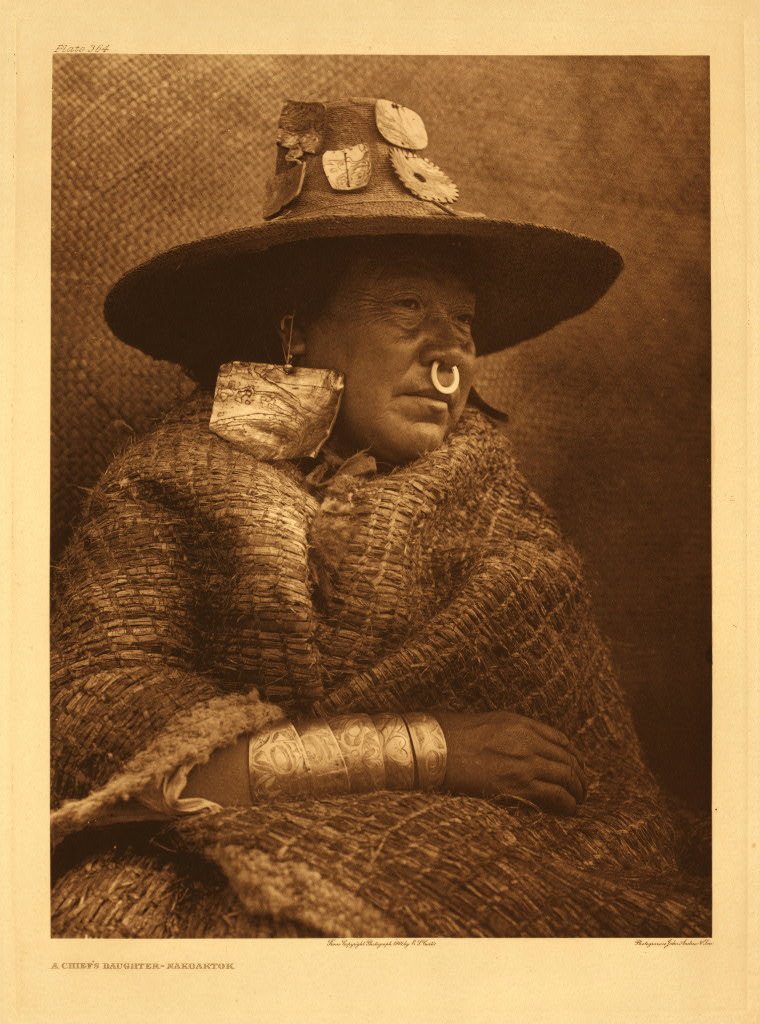
A ʼNakwaxdaʼxw chief's daughter (photo by Edward S. Curtis, 1914)

First Nations reserves under the governance of the Gwaʼsala-ʼNakwaxdaʼxw are:

- Ann Island IR No. 7, on Ann Island in Smith Sound, 10.10 ha. 51°16′00″N 127°48′00″W
- Dedagaus IR No. 8, on the north shore of Seymour Inlet, 1/2 mile north of the Nahwokto Rapids, 0.30 ha. 51°06′00″N 127°31′00″W
- Halowis IR No. 5, at the mouth of Smokehouse Creek at the head of Long Lake, 3.60 ha. 51°18′00″N 127°03′00″W
- Kai-too-kwis IR No. 15, at the head of Chief Nollis Bay on Allison Sound, north of Belize Inlet, 20.80 ha. 51°11′00″N 127°05′00″W
- Kequesta IR No. 1, on the north shore of the entrance to Nuget Sound, 70.40 ha. 51°06′00″N 127°28′00″W
- Khazisela IR No. 7, on an island in the centre of the Nahkwocto Raids at the north end of Schooner Channel, 0.40 ha. 51°06′00″N 127°31′00″W
- Ko-kwi-iss IR No. 14, on the east shore of Allison Sound to the north of Belize Inlet, 6.40 ha. 51°09′00″N 127°06′00″W
- Kuthlo IR No. 18, at the head of Salmon Arm of Seymour Inlet, 3.0 ha. 51°04′00″N 126°39′00″W
- Kwetahkis IR No. 9, on the north shore of Whelakis Lagoon on Seymour Inlet, 4.0 ha. 50°58′00″N 127°13′00″W
- Mahpahkum IR No. 4, on Deserters Island in the Deserters Group, and including small off-shore islands, 7.80 ha.
- Na-kwockto IR No. 2, on three small islands at the mouth of Nugent Sound, 1/2 mile south of Kequesta IR No. 1, 0.40 ha. 51°05′00″N 127°28′00″W
- Nathlegalis IR No. 3, comprising Indian Island and five smaller islands in Takush Harbour in Browning Channel, 134.40 ha. 51°17′00″N 127°39′00″W
- Nekite IR No. 2, at the mouth of the Nekite River at the head of Smith Inlet, 66.80 ha. 51°25′00″N 127°05′00″W
- Owh-wis-too-a-wan IR No. 10, at Eclipse Narrows at the mouth of Frederick Sound, Seymour Inlet, 5.30 ha. 51°05′00″N 126°46′00″W
- Pahas IR No. 3, on the north shore of Blunden Harbour, 39.90 ha. 50°54′00″N 127°18′00″W
- Pel-loothʼl Kai IR No. 17, at the east end of Belize Inlet, 1.70 ha. 51°07′00″N 126°55′00″W
- Peneece IR No. 11, at the head of Wigwam Bay on the north shore of Seymour Inlet, 3.50 ha. 51°07′00″N 126°42′00″W
- Saagoombahlah IR No. 6, on the east shore of Schooner Passage east of Braham Island, 1.80 ha. 51°05′00″N 127°31′00″W
- Ta-a-ack IR No. 5, on one of the islands in the Storm Islands at the west end of Queen Charlotte Strait, 13.90 ha. 51°02′00″N 127°43′00″W
- Toksee IR No. 4, at the junction of Long Lake and Wyclees Lagoon, 5.60 ha. 51°14′00″N 127°20′00″W
- Tsai-kwi-ee IR No. 13, at Village Bay on the east shore of Mereworth Sound, 4.60 ha. 51°10′00″N 127°25′00″W
- Tseetsum-Sawlasilah IR No. 6, on the north shore of Naysash Inlet, Smith Sound, 2.10 ha. 51°20′00″N 127°19′00″W
- Tsulquate IR No. 4, on the west shore of Hardy Bay, one mile north of Port Hardy, 59.90 ha. 50°44′00″N 127°30′00″W
- Waump IR No. 16, at the head of Allison Sound, Belize Inlet, 37.60 ha. 51°11′00″N 126°55′00″W
- Wawwatʼl IR No 12, on the right bank of the Seymour River, two miles from the head of Seymour Inlet, 66.80 ha. 51°13′00″N 126°40′00″W
- Wyclese IR No. 1, on the south shore of Smith Sound at the entrance to Wyclees Lagoon, 223 ha. 51°17′00″N 127°21′00″W

== See also ==
- Kwakʼwala (language)
