= Fox Islands (British Columbia) =

Group of islands in British Columbia

Coordinates: 51°05′00″N 127°37′00″W

The Fox Islands are a small group of islands in the entrance to Slingsby Channel in the Queen Charlotte Strait region of the Central Coast region of British Columbia, Canada. Slingsby Channel lies along the north flank of Bramham Island and is one of only two waterways connecting to Seymour Inlet and its side-inlets, which form a maze of inlets within the nearby mainland; the other, on the east side of Bramham, is Schooner Channel (formerly Schooner Passage).

== Name origin ==
The Fox Islands, Slingsby Channel and Bramham Island are all named in association with Bramham Park, the Yorkshire home of George Lane-Fox.

== Climate ==
The average temperature is 6°C. The warmest month is July at 14°C, and the coldest month is December at 0°C.

The surrounding area is mainly coniferous forest, and is nearly unpopulated with less than two inhabitants per square kilometer.

== See also ==
- Blunden Harbour
