= Neǧiƛ/Nekite Estuary Conservancy =

Conservancy in British Columbia, Canada

- IUCN category II (national park)
- Location within British Columbia
- Interactive map of Neǧiƛ/Nekite Estuary Conservancy
- Location: Central Coast, British Columbia, Canada
- Nearest city: Rivers Inlet
- Coordinates: 51°23′30″N 127°07′10″W
- Area: 326 ha (810 acres)
- Designation: Conservancy
- Established: 2007
- Governing body: BC Parks

The Neǧiƛ/Nekite Estuary Conservancy is a conservancy in British Columbia, Canada. It preserves the estuary of the Nekite River at the head of the Smith Inlet on the North Coast in the Central Coast Regional District. It borders the Lockhart-Gordon Conservancy to its west and is just southwest of the Nekite 2 reserve. Established in 2007, the conservancy covers 481 hectares of land. It is located approximately 80 kilometers northeast of the town of Port Hardy or 32 kilometers south of Rivers Inlet. There is no road access and there are no settlements within the conservancy.
