= Bramham Island =

Island in Canada

- Interactive map of Bramham Island

Geography
- Location: Queen Charlotte Strait, British Columbia, Canada
- Coordinates: 51°04′00″N 127°34′00″W
- Archipelago: Pacific Coast Islands
- Area: 23 km^{2} (8.9 sq mi)

Administration
- Canada
- Province: British Columbia

Bramham Island is an island in the Queen Charlotte Strait region of the Central Coast of British Columbia, Canada, on the north side of the entrance to that strait. It lies in the entrance to the maze of waterways inland to the northeast, focused on Seymour Inlet, which includes Belize Inlet and Allison Harbour and Nugent Sound, though it is flanked only by Slingsby Channel on its north, and Schooner Channel (formerly Schooner Passage) on its east. To its west are the open waters at the convergence of Queen Charlotte Sound and Queen Charlotte Strait. About 23 km^{2} in size, it is mostly low-lying hills and has a number of freshwater lakes.

Bramham Island was also the name of a former post office at 51°05′00″N 127°34′40″W, though there has been no settlement there since 1923.

== Name origin ==
The island was named c. 1866 by Captain Pender of the Royal Navy after Bramham Park, the Yorkshire home of George Lane-Fox, in association with Slingsby Channel and the Fox Islands. "[Bramham Park] ....A battle was fought in this neighborhood in 1408, which subsequently secured the Crown of England to Henry IV."

== See also ==
- Blunden Harbour
