= Mount Bullock =

Mountain in British Columbia, Canada

- Location within British Columbia
- Interactive map of Mount Bullock

Highest point
- Elevation: 629 m (2,064 ft)
- Prominence: 504 m (1,654 ft)
- Parent peak: Marion Peak (665 m)
- Listing: Mountains of British Columbia
- Coordinates: 50°57′42″N 127°06′37″W

Geography
- Location: British Columbia, Canada
- District: Range 1 Coast Land District
- Parent range: Pacific Ranges
- Topo map: NTS 92L14 Bradley Lagoon

Mount Bullock, 36 km northeast of Port Hardy, is a mountain in the Central Coast region of British Columbia, Canada, standing on the north side of the lower reaches of Actaeon Sound, which is a sidewater of Drury Inlet. Lee Lake is to its north, the Bond Peninsula immediately south.

== Name origin ==
The mountain is listed in Burns Naval Biography, publ. 1849. Dove Island nearby, at the entrance to Actaeon Sound via Actress Passage, is believed to have been named for the gunboat HMS Dove, commanded by Lieut. Cdr James Bullock, which was deployed as tender to HMS Actaeon in the East Indies and Chinese waters in later years.

== See also ==
- Bullock (disambiguation)
