= W̓aw̓aƛ/Seymour Estuary Conservancy =

Conservancy in British Columbia, Canada

- IUCN category Ib (wilderness area)
- Location within British Columbia
- Interactive map of W̓aw̓aƛ/Seymour Estuary Conservancy
- Location: Mount Waddington, British Columbia, Canada
- Nearest city: Port McNeill
- Coordinates: 51°12′12″N 126°40′02″W
- Area: 326 ha (810 acres)
- Designation: Conservancy
- Established: 2007
- Governing body: BC Parks

The W̓aw̓aƛ/Seymour Estuary Conservancy, also known as Ẁaẁaƛ/Seymour Estuary Conservancy or W̓aw̓ley/Seymour Estuary Conservancy, is a conservancy in British Columbia, Canada. It preserves the estuary of the Seymour River at the head of the Seymour Inlet on the North Coast in the Regional District of Mount Waddington and borders the Wawwat’l 12 reserve. Established in 2007, the conservancy covers 326 hectares of land. It is located approximately 80 kilometers northeast of the town of Port Hardy or 75 kilometers north of the town of Port McNeill. There is no road access and there are no settlements within the conservancy.

== See also ==
- Seymour River (Seymour Inlet)
- Seymour Inlet
