= Drury Inlet =

Inlet in British Columbia, Canada

Drury inlet is an inlet in the Queen Charlotte Strait region of the Central Coast of British Columbia, Canada, extending west from Wells Passage to the northwest of North Broughton Island, northwest of the town of Port Hardy. Branching off to the northeast from the north side of the head of the inlet is Actaeon Sound.

Compton Point is the headland on the south side of the entrance, at 50°53′09″N 126°53′45″W, opposite North Broughton Island, which is the most northwesterly of the Broughton Archipelago, which is situated to the north of the mouth of Knight Inlet. Compton Point is the tip of a peninsula of the mainland, on the outside of which is located Blunden Harbour, some distance to the west from the south entrance of Wells Passage and is itself at the entry to another series of inlets (Belize Inlet, Seymour Inlet and others).

Among the features on the inlet's shoreline, Bughouse Bay at 50°53′57″N 126°58′54″W was named for "a deranged settler who once lived in a cabin on the shore of the bay". Bughouse Lake is immediately north of it away from the shore at 50°54′15″N 126°58′52″W

On the southeast side of Actress Passage at 50°56′28″N 127°07′56″W, which is the waterway connecting Actaeon Sound into Drury Inlet is Charlotte Point at 50°56′03″N 127°08′16″W, which was first published on Admiralty maps in 1865 like other locations in the area. Dove Island sits in the middle of the opening, on the Drury Inlet side. It comprises Dove Island Indian Reserve No. 12, 8.1 ha., which is under the administration of the Gwawaenuk Tribe band government of the Kwakwaka'wakw group of peoples. It is believed to have been named for His Majesty's gunboat Dove, commanded by Lieut. Cdr James Bullock, which was deployed as tender to HMS Actaeon in the East Indies and Chinese waters in later years.

Across the head of Drury Inlet to the west of Actress Passage is Sutherland Bay at 50°55′30″N 127°10′59″W. East of that bay and south of Dove Island and Actress Passage are the Muirhead Islands within the western reaches of Drury Inlet at 50°55′16″N 127°08′14″W.

== Name origin ==
Daniel Pender named the inlet in 1866 for Admiral Byron Drury, who earlier as a Commander had been captain of HMS Pandora. Drury had succeeded Commander James Wood, upon that ship's termination of her commission to the Pacific Station, from where she was sent to the Australia station. Other places around Drury Inlet are named for officers who served on the Pandora are Mount Kerr, for Thomas Kerr, Mount Jolliffe, for surgeon John Jolliffe and Pandora Head, for the vessel itself. The Bond Peninsula and Bond Lagoon on the south side of Actaeon Sound may also have been named in association with the Actaeon.

Among these is Byron Point at 50°54′15″N 127°01′16″W, named for Admiral Drury.

== See also ==
- Drury (disambiguation)
