= Allison Harbour =

Harbour in British Columbia

Coordinates: 51°03′00″N 127°30′00″W

Allison Harbour, also formerly known as False Bay and False Schooner Passage, is a natural harbour on the Central Coast of British Columbia, Canada, extending north from Queen Charlotte Strait to the southeast of Bramham Island. It is the site of the former post office and steamer landing of Allison Harbour, British Columbia. The Allison Reefs lie in the entrance to the sound; Allison Cone (185m), which is nearby between Shelter Bay and Cape Caution, was named in association with Allison Harbour. It is now protected as part of Allison Harbour Marine Provincial Park.

There is no connection to Alison Sound, which is an arm of Belize Inlet in the complex of inlets leading out of Seymour Inlet.

== Name origin ==
The present name was conferred in 1922 in honour of a Mr. Allison, manager of logging operations for the Smith-Dollar Lumber Company, circa 1922.

== See also ==
- Schooner Channel (formerly Schooner Passage)
