= Alison Sound =

Sound in British Columbia

Coordinates: 51°15′00″N 127°00′00″W

Alison Sound is a sound in the Central Coast region of British Columbia, Canada.

== Geography ==
It extends north and northwest from Belize Inlet, which itself is one of the many sidewaters of Seymour Inlet. There is no connection in name or geography to Allison Harbour, which is to the southwest.
