= Takush River =

Coordinates: 51°15′52″N 127°35′56″W

The Takush River is a small river on the Central Coast of British Columbia, Canada, flowing north into Ahclakerho Channel, which is part of Smith Sound.

== See also ==
- List of rivers of British Columbia
- Takush Harbour
