= Slingsby Channel =

Strait in British Columbia

Coordinates: 51°05′00″N 127°34′00″W

Slingsby Channel is a strait on the north side of Bramham Island in the Queen Charlotte Strait region of the Central Coast of British Columbia. It is one of only two entrances to Seymour Inlet and the associated maze of waterways inland, which lie to the northeast of Bramham. The other entrance is Schooner Channel, formerly Schooner Passage, on the east side of that island.

The Fox Islands, which lie in its entrance, Bramham Island and the channel itself, plus Slingsby Rock and Slingsby Point, are named in association with Bramham Park, the Yorkshire home of George Lane-Fox.

Through the Slingsby Channel flows the world's strongest current, the Nakwakto Rapids, that has been measured at speeds up to 18.4 miles per hour. The current is so fast at times, that people have tied a rope to Turret Rock, which is located right in the middle of the rapids, and then water-skied.
