= Gwawaenuk Tribe =

Band government of the Kwakwaka'wakw people in British Columbia, Canada

Coordinates: 50°55′59″N 127°08′36″W

The Gwawaenuk Tribe, or Gwawaʼenux̱w is a First Nations band government of the Kwakwaka'wakw people located in the Queen Charlotte Strait region of the Central Coast region of British Columbia, Canada. The Gwawaenuk Tribe has no year-round road access to a service centre and being about 160 km to 240 km from the nearest service centre.

== Language ==
As of 2012, about half the tribe speaks the Kwak'wala language. The tribe's dialect is called "Gwawaenuk."

== Demographics ==
First nation number 627 with 39 members. It is one of about 175 Aboriginal Communities in Canada that is off-the-grid.

== List of Reserves ==
Indian reserves under the administration of the band are:

- Dove Island Indian Reserve No. 12, all of Dove Island at the entrance to Actress Pass, where Actaeon Sound opens into Drury Inlet, 8.10 ha.
- Gleyka Indian Reserve No. 6, on the east shore of Actaeon Sound, 3.20 ha.
- Hopetown Indian Reserve No. 10A, on the south shore of Watson Island in Grappler Sound, 2.40 ha.
- Kadis Indian Reserve No. 11, the entirety of Dickson Island at the west end of Broughton Island, 128.60 ha.
- Keogh Indian Reserve No. 6, at the east end of Mackenzie Sound, north of Queen Charlotte Strait, 4.30 ha.
- Kunstamis Indian Reserve No. 2, on the north shore of Claydon Bay, Grappler Sound, Wells Passage, 7.0 ha.
- Kunstamis Indian Reserve No. 2A, on the west shore of Claydon Bay on Grappler Sound, adjacent to IR No. 2, 39.20 ha.
- Lawanth Indian Reserve No. 5, at the end of Embley Lagoon, Grappler Sound, north of Wells Passage, 5.70 ha.
- Magwekstala Indian Reserve No. 10, on the east short of Burly Bay in Hopetown Passage to the south of Watson Island, 3.80 ha.
- Quay Indian Reserve No. 4, at the north end of Nimmo Bay on Mackenzie Sound, 4.0 ha.

== Recent community history ==
In 2009, the Gwawaenuk collaborated on a local pilot project to fight diabetes, called "Diabetes and My Nation," which proved to be unusually successful, according to a report at the World Diabetes Congress in Montreal. The program coupled education on medical checkups and healthy eating, including traditional foods, with community events promoting physical activity, such as a "young warriors program that had youth build and race a canoe."

In 2011, a "European strain of the Infectious Salmon Anaemia (ISA) virus has been identified in wild sockeye smolt taken from the Rivers Inlet region of British Columbia. Gwawaenuk Chief Charlie Williams has been vehemently opposed to salmon farming in his territory due to concerns about environmental impacts, including disease transfer. Gwawaenuk territory is centred around Watson Island in the Broughton Archipelago." The tribe, which depends on marine life for subsistence, opposes nearby fish farming as a potential source of disease affecting wild salmon. A 2003 lawsuit was filed in conjunction with the Sierra Club, because "98% of our wild pink Salmon run was massacred by sea lice." "The lawsuit asks for an injunction to prevent the stocking of open net cage salmon aquaculture facilities in the Broughton, to prevent the use of SLICE, a pesticide that has been scientifically shown to have impacts on crustaceans and has not been generally approved for use in Canada, and to require that infected sites remove infected fish from the marine environment." Tribal members have learned GIS for coastal mapping.

Hereditary chief Robert Joseph served as a "special adviser at West Vancouver's Indian Residential School Survivors Society', serving those who had suffered abuse at Indian boarding schools prior to their 1966 closure, in conjunction with the Indian Residential Schools Truth and Reconciliation Commission.

Traditional Gwawaenuk masks are featured in the exhibits of the Museum at Campbell River.

== See also ==
- Environmental issues with salmon
