= Lockhart-Gordon Conservancy =

Conservancy in British Columbia, Canada

- IUCN category Ib (wilderness area)
- Location within British Columbia
- Location: Central Coast, British Columbia, Canada
- Nearest city: Rivers Inlet
- Coordinates: 51°28′28″N 127°16′37″W
- Area: 24,501 ha (94.60 sq mi)
- Designation: Conservancy
- Established: 2007
- Governing body: BC Parks

The Lockhart-Gordon Conservancy is a conservancy in British Columbia, Canada. It preserves the northern coast of the Draney Inlet, as well as the Lockhart-Gordon Creek and the Draney Creek bassins, in the Central Coast Regional District. It borders the Owikeno Conservancy to its north and the Neǧiƛ/Nekite Estuary Conservancy to its southeast. It is approximately 120 kilometres south of Bella Coola and 20 kilometres south of Rivers Inlet. Established in 2007, the conservancy covers 24,501 hectares of land.
