= Bug-out =

Bug-out may refer to the following

- "Bug Out", an episode of M*A*S*H
- Bug Out (TV series), a documentary series about a heist of live insects
- Bug-out bag
- Bug-out location
- Bug-out vehicle, disaster evacuation vehicle

== See also ==
- Bughouse (disambiguation)
