= Owikeno Conservancy =

Conservancy in British Columbia, Canada

- IUCN category Ib (wilderness area)
- Location within British Columbia
- Interactive map of Owikeno Conservancy
- Location: Central Coast, British Columbia, Canada
- Nearest city: Rivers Inlet
- Coordinates: 51°44′29″N 126°59′14″W
- Area: 70,569 ha (272.47 sq mi)
- Designation: Conservancy
- Established: 2007
- Governing body: BC Parks

The Owikeno Conservancy is a conservancy in British Columbia, Canada. It preserves the western parts of the north and south coasts of Owikeno Lake in the Central Coast Regional District, as well as the Ashlulm Creek, Inziana River and Reeve Creek bassins on the north coast. It borders the Katit 1 reserve with Rivers Inlet to its west and the Lockhart-Gordon Conservancy to its south, It is approximately 65 kilometres south of Bella Coola. Established in 2007, the conservancy covers 70,569 hectares of land.

== See also ==
- Owikeno Lake
- Rivers Inlet
