= Naysash Inlet =

Inlet in British Columbia

Naysash Inlet is an inlet on the Central Coast of British Columbia, Canada, branching off the north side of Smith Inlet in the Smith Sound area. Naysash Bay is located just inside the entrance to Naysash Inlet at 51°18′59″N 127°20′35″W. Naysash Creek, formerly Boulder Creek, flows southwest into Naysash Inlet at 51°20′21″N 127°19′15″W.

Tseetsum-Sawlasilah IR No. 6, which is one of the many reserves in the area of the Gwa'sala-'Nakwaxda'xw Nations band government, is on the north shore of the inlet, at 51°20′00″N 127°19′00″W and is 2.10 ha. in size.
