= Bughouse =

Bughouse can refer to:

- A psychiatric hospital
- Bughouse chess
- Operation Bughouse, an alternate name for the fictional Battle of Klendathu in Robert A. Heinlein's novel Starship Troopers
- Bughouse (band).
- Bughouse Bay on the north side of Drury Inlet in the Central Coast of British Columbia, Canada
  - Bughouse Lake, immediately behind and north of Bughouse Bay

== See also ==
- Bug-out (disambiguation)
