= Pałəmin/Estero Basin Conservancy =

Conservancy in British Columbia, Canada

- IUCN category II (national park)
- Location within British Columbia
- Interactive map of Pałəmin/Estero Basin Conservancy
- Location: Strathcona, British Columbia, Canada
- Nearest city: Port McNeill
- Coordinates: 50°30′56″N 125°10′49″W
- Area: 2,978 ha (11.50 sq mi)
- Designation: Conservancy
- Established: 2007
- Governing body: BC Parks

The Pałəmin/Estero Basin Conservancy, is a conservancy in British Columbia, Canada. It preserves the area around the Estero Basin, north of Egerton Peak, at the head of the Frederick Arm of the Cordero Channel on the North Coast in the Strathcona Regional District. Established in 2007, the conservancy covers 2978 hectares of land (2330 hectares of upland and 648 hectares of foreshore). It is located approximately 55 kilometres north of the city of Campbell River. There are no settlements within the conservancy. It is contained within the M̓ac̓inuxʷ Special Forest Management Area as the Phillips Estuary/ʔNacinuxʷ Conservancy.
