= ʼNakʼwaxdaʼxw =

North American indigenous nation

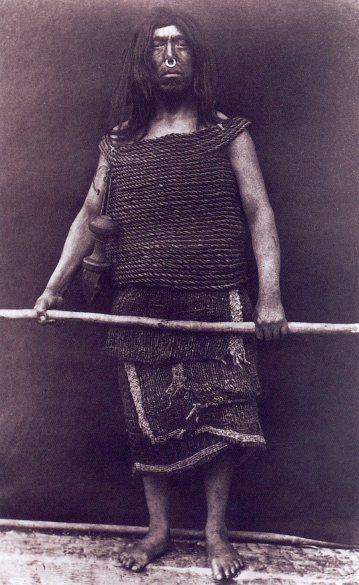
ʼNakʼwaxdaʼxw warrior, photo Edward Curtis

The ʼNakʼwaxdaʼxw, also known as the Nakoaktok, are an Indigenous nation, a part of the Kwakwakaʼwakw, in the Central Coast region of British Columbia, on northern Vancouver Island.

In 1964, they were relocated by government officials from their ancient village Baʼas at Blunden Harbour (on the mainland side of the Queen Charlotte Strait) to their current main village at Port Hardy.

The Indian Act First Nations government of this nation is called Gwaʼsala-ʼNakwaxdaʼxw Nations, and includes the Gwaʼsala people, who were traditionally a separate group, from the area of Smith Sound.

== See also ==
- Kwakwakaʼwakw
