= Gwaʼsala =

Group of the Kwakwakaʼwakw First Nation

The Gwaʼsala are one of the main groups of the Kwakwakaʼwakw people, now joined with the ʼNakʼwaxdaʼxw (Nakoaktok) in the Gwaʼsala-ʼNakwaxdaʼxw Nations band government. Their traditional home and current territory is around Smith Sound and Smith Inlet, while that of the ʼNakwaxdaʼxw is at Blunden Harbour further south on the north side of Queen Charlotte Strait.
