= Seymour River =

Seymour River may refer to:

- Seymour River (Burrard Inlet), in the North Shore of the Lower Mainland, British Columbia
- Seymour River (Seymour Inlet), in the Mount Waddington district of British Columbia
- Seymour River (Shuswap Lake), in the Shuswap area of British Columbia
- Seymour River (Vermont), see List of rivers of Vermont
