= Bramham Park =

Grade I listed historic house museum in West Yorkshire, England

Coordinates: 53°52′13″N 1°22′49″W

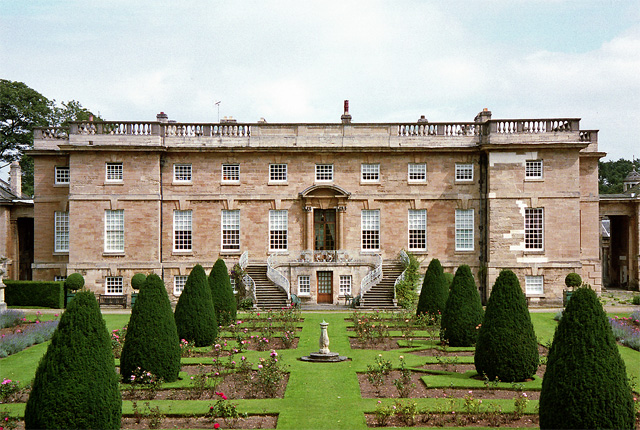
Bramham Park

Bramham Park is a Grade I listed 18th-century country house in Bramham, between Leeds and Wetherby, in West Yorkshire, England.

The house, constructed of magnesian limestone ashlar with stone slate roofs in a classical style, is built to a linear plan with a main range linked by colonnades to flanking pavilions. The main block is of three storeys with a raised forecourt. The house has a 500 acres (200 ha) landscaped park, ornamented by a series of follies and avenues laid out in the 18th-century landscape tradition, and is enclosed by 1,235 acres (500 ha) of arable farmland. Bramham Park is used annually for the Leeds Festival.

== History ==
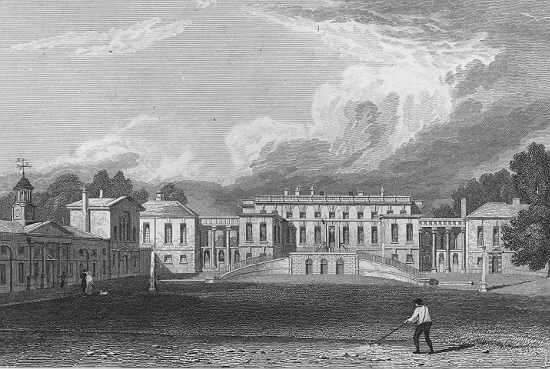
Bramham Park from Jones's Views of the Seats of Noblemen and Gentlemen (1829). A carriage ramp on the entrance facade conveys visitors to the principal entrance on the piano nobile.

The Baroque mansion was built in 1698 for Robert Benson, 1st Baron Bingley. It has remained in the ownership of Benson's descendants since its completion in 1710. He died with no male heirs and the barony was extinguished. The estate passed into the hands of his son-in-Law George Fox-Lane (c. 1697–1773), who was given the re-created title of Baron Bingley in 1763. His son and heir, the Honourable Robert Fox-Lane, Member of Parliament for York, predeceased him in 1768 and the barony consequently became extinct a second time on his death in 1773. The estate was inherited for life by his illegitimate daughter Mary, who had married Sir John Goodricke of Ribston Hall and died in 1792. It then passed to the first Baron's nephew, James Fox-Lane, who considerably improved the estate.

From him the estate went to his son George Lane-Fox, known as "The Gambler", who was the MP for Beverley. Following a serious fire in 1828 he was obliged to move to nearby Bowcliffe Hall. The Bramham Park house was then left empty and derelict for 80 years until restored for his grandson George Lane-Fox under the supervision of the architect Detmar Blow in about 1908. George became 1st Baron Bingley of the third creation when the title was recreated in 1933, but had four daughters and no sons meaning that the barony was extinguished for the third time upon his death. The house was inherited by his eldest daughter Marcia, whose husband Joe Ward-Jackson adopted the Lane-Fox surname. Their son George Lane Fox (1931–2012), after 20 years in the Household Cavalry, moved into the Hall and put the estate on an up-to-date financial footing, founding the annual Bramham Horse Trials in 1974.

Today it remains a private residence in the hands of George's son, Nick, while the park is the setting for the Horse Trials and the Leeds Festival, which moved to Bramham in 2003. A restricted area of the grounds is kept as gardens and run as a tourist attraction — visitors can also tour the house but only in pre-arranged parties. The house was the filming location for the third series of The Syndicate.

=== Bramham Moor Hunt and associated York Races ===
The "York Races" were held at Bramham Moor from the early 1700s and continued to be so until being moved to Knavesmire and thus "giving supremacy to York" by the mid-century. Races continued to be held at Bramham into the late 19th century. The Bramham Moor Hunt remained popular well into the late 20th century and exists as the Badsworth and Bramham Moor Hunt. Princess Mary partook in both the Bramham Moor Hunt and its associated point-to-point races.

== Architecture ==
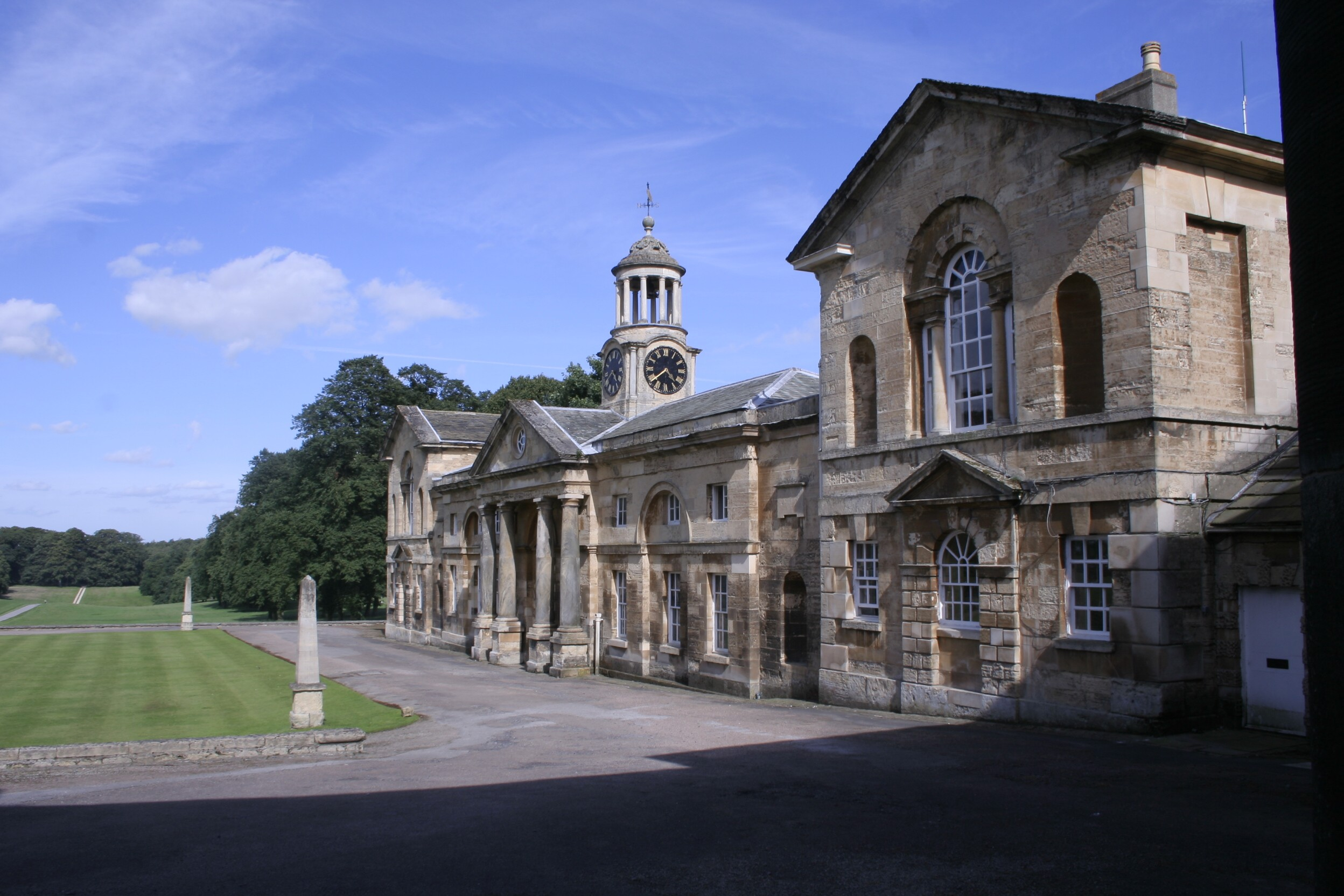
The Stables

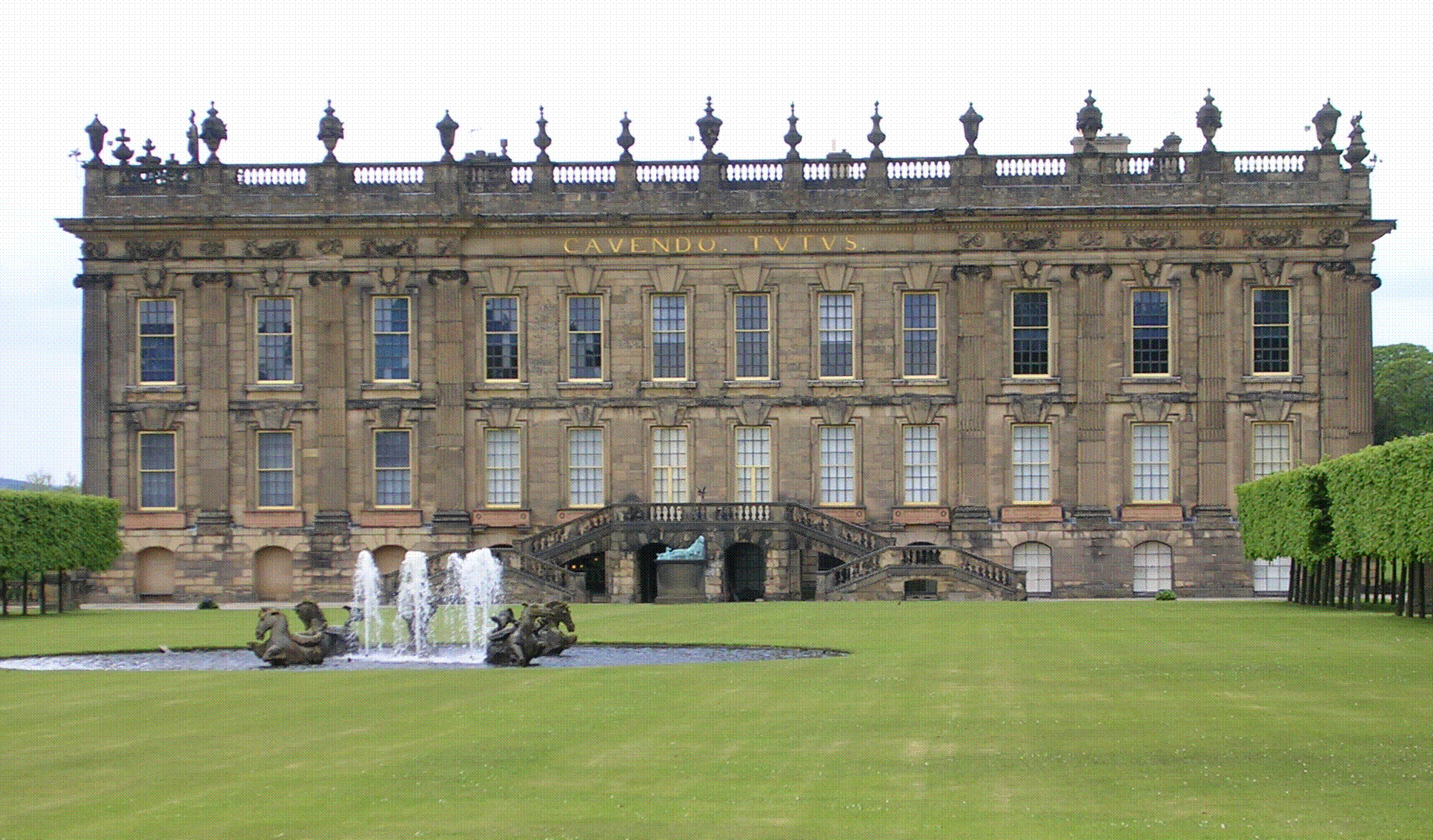
Chatsworth House, England's first truly Baroque house, was built between 1687 and 1707, almost exactly contemporary with Bramham. It was designed by William Talman. Colen Campbell's drawings of Bramham of 1717 show a remarkable similarity of style between the corps de logis of Bramham and Chatsworth.

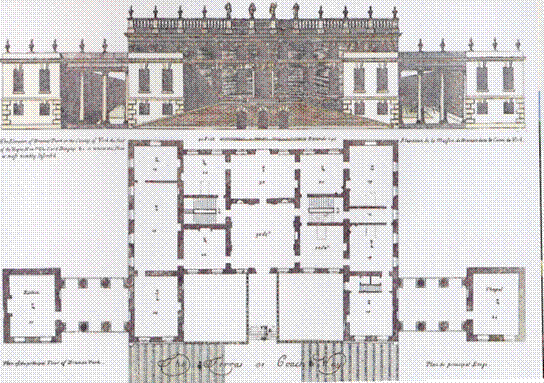
Bramham Park, drawn by Colen Campbell in 1717. The statuary decorating the roofscape was never executed. The carriage ramp is an unusual feature, leading to the piano nobile.

Bramham is a product of a grand tour; its creator Robert Benson, later Lord Bingley, completed his formal education with a grand tour in 1697, and whilst in Italy he began to envisage his new mansion in the Palladian manner complemented in a landscaped park, in the fashion made popular by Le Nôtre in France in the late 17th century.

The architect of Bramham is unknown, although it is speculated that Giacomo Leoni was involved (Leoni was responsible for the rebuilding of Lyme Park in an Italianate style in the neighbouring county of Cheshire some years later). However, Leoni did not arrive in England until several years after the completion of Bramham. Other names suggested include those of James Gibbs, Thomas Archer and James Paine. It is known that Paine designed the stables which flank the corps de logis, but the other contenders were too young. The only chronological possibility is Thomas Archer (1668–1743). The most likely scenario is that Bramham is the work of Robert Benson himself, probably working with a local draughtsman. While it is also quite possible that Benson was inspired by drawings taken from Palladio's books, the design of the house suggests that Benson was more inspired by the restrained Baroque style then popular in France, the style in which Mansart's Versailles was constructed between 1678 and 1684. Indeed, it has been speculated that Versaille's landscape architect André le Nôtre had a hand in the design of Bramham's landscaped park.

The architect William Talman has also been suggested as a possible architect, and he was indeed working on Chatsworth House some sixty miles away from Bramham at this time. However, unlike Chatsworth (which is far larger), Bramham is given flanking wings more in the Palladian style, linked to the house by short colonnades. The flanking wings contained the kitchen in the south wing, and the chapel in the north, thus – as at the Baroque Blenheim Palace – balancing both spiritual and bodily needs equally. However, while Campbell's drawing of Bramham show the never-executed statuary on the roof and near-perfect proportions, the reality of the executed design suggests a less professional hand than Talman's. Two low projecting wings from the corps de logis complicate the design, while the two colonnades are not quite long enough to give the flanking wings the independence from the main house to allow their design to be fully appreciated.

== Interior ==
The interior of Bramham Park was completely restored in the early part of the 20th century, having mostly been abandoned after the fire of 1828. The central Great Hall, double storey in height and severe in its Baroque design, still bears the smoke staining on its stone walls.

== Grounds ==
The parkland surrounding the house contains a number of grade I listed ornamental structures, including:

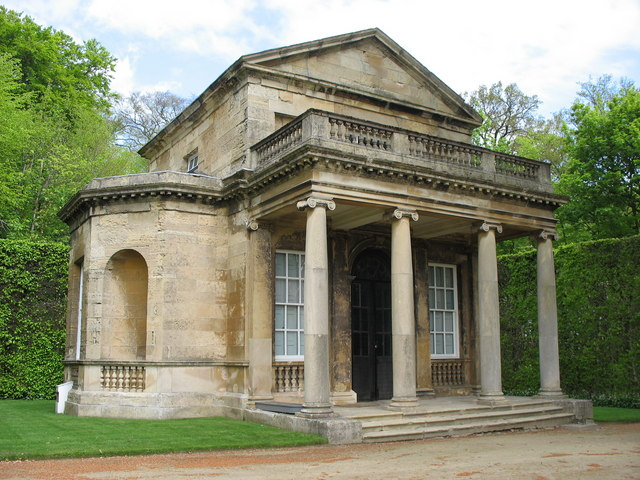
The Chapel

- The Chapel

Situated at the rear of the house, the chapel, was built around 1760 by James Paine for George Fox Lane in the local Magnesian limestone ashlar. It was constructed in the classical style as a single unit of 2 storeys and 3 bays and with a porch and four Ionic columns across the full width of ground floor.

Originally built as a Palladian Temple it was later used as an Orangery, a summerhouse and then consecrated as a chapel around 1906.

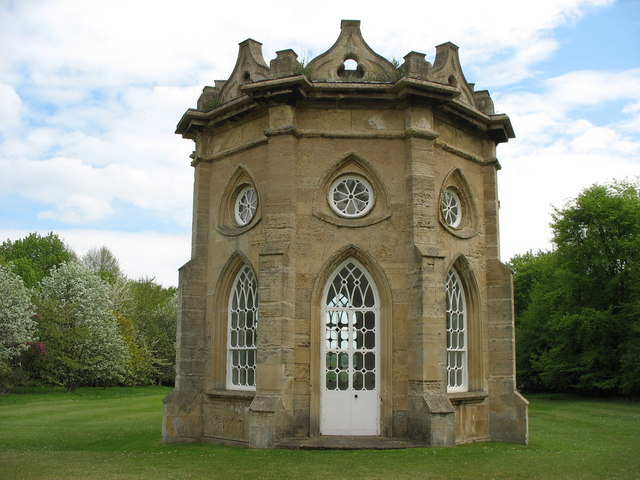
The Gothic Temple

- The Gothic temple

South of the house stands the Gothic Temple, also constructed of Magnesian limestone ashlar in the 18th century. Built in a Gothic style in two storeys it is octagonal in plan with buttresses at each corners.

In 1907 it was converted into a water tower to supply spring water to the house and was used as such until after the World War II.

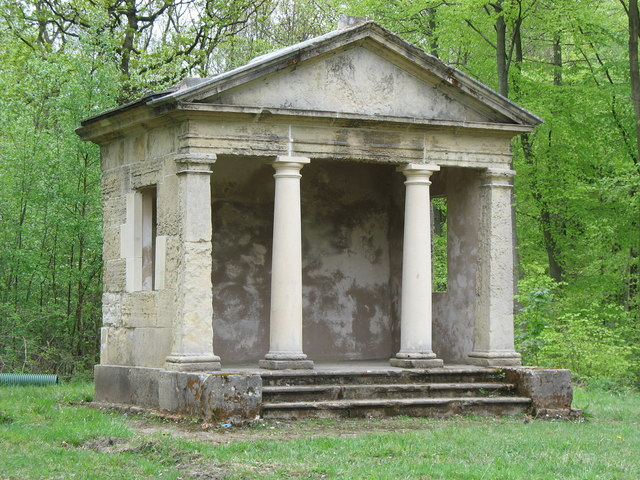
The Open Temple

- The Open Temple

The Open Temple was probably constructed in the early 18th century in Magnesian limestone ashlar and was built in a classical style as a single cell with a pedimented 3-bay facade.

The temple was also known as the Lead Lads Temple from the lead statues which once stood on the pediment. They were stolen by vandals.

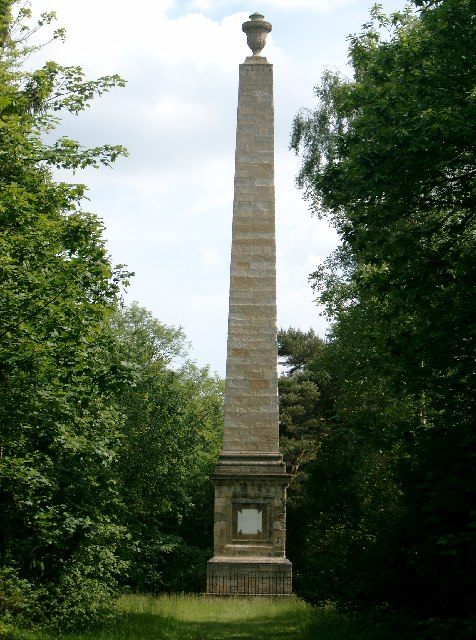
The Obelisk

- The Ionic Temple or Rotunda

Standing in the Black Fen pleasure ground, the Ionic Temple was probably built in the mid 18th century by James Paine for George Lane Fox. It is constructed of sandstone ashlar in the form of a circular Ionic temple on a 3-step podium with a colonnade of 16 unfluted Ionic columns supporting an entablature.

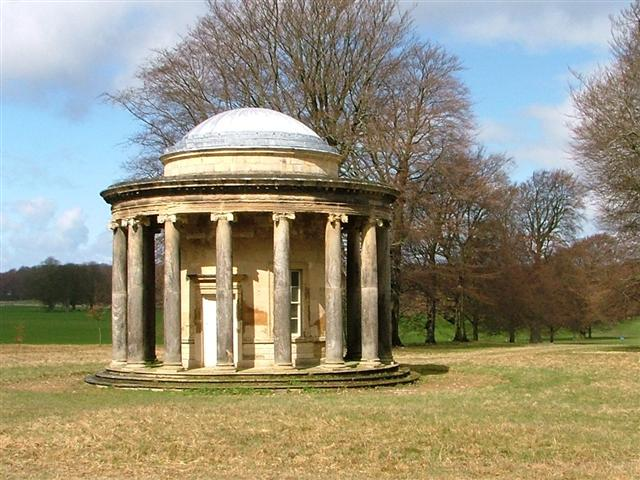
The Rotunda

The Black Fen lies a mile from the house. From the Rotunda six straight paths lead to other features of the estate.

== Legacy ==
Bramham Island on the north side of Queen Charlotte Strait in the Central Coast region of British Columbia, Canada, was named after Bramham Park. Named in association with it were Slingsby Channel, on its north side, and the Fox Islands, which lie in the entrance to that channel at its opening into Queen Charlotte Strait.

== See also ==
- Grade I listed buildings in West Yorkshire
- Listed buildings in Bramham cum Oglethorpe
- Listed buildings in Barwick in Elmet and Scholes
