= Actaeon Sound =

Bay in British Columbia, Canada

Actaeon Sound is a sound in the Queen Charlotte Strait region of the Central Coast of British Columbia, branching off northeasterly from the north side of Drury Inlet near its head on the mainland of British Columbia to the north of the town of Port McNeill, on the opposite side of Queen Charlotte Strait. On the south side of the sound is the Bond Peninsula at 50°56′50″N 127°06′55″W, which is formed by a sidewater, Bond Lagoon at 50°56′34″N 127°06′34″W, both presumably named in 1865 by Captain Pender, in association with other Admiralty and HMS Actaeon-related names.

On the southeast side of Actress Passage at 50°56′28″N 127°07′56″W, which is the waterway connecting Actaeon Sound into Drury Inlet is Charlotte Point at 50°56′03″N 127°08′16″W, which was first published on Admiralty maps in 1865 like other locations in the area. Dove Island sits in the middle of the opening, on the Drury Inlet side. Located at 50°55′59″N 127°08′36″W, all of it comprises Dove Island Indian Reserve No. 12, 8.1 ha., which is under the administration of the Gwawaenuk Tribe band government of the Kwakwaka'wakw group of peoples.

It is believed to have been named for the gunboat HMS Dove, commanded by Lieut. Cdr James Bullock, which was deployed as tender to HMS Actaeon in the East Indies and Chinese waters in later years. On the north side of the lower reaches of Actaeon Sound, across from the Bond Peninsula, is Mount Bullock, at 50°57′42″N 127°06′37″W, noted by BC names, citing the Canadian Geographic Names Board, "Listed in "Burns Naval Biography", 1849".

== Name origin ==
Name adopted in 1865 by Captain Pender as suggested by W. Blakeney, RN, paymaster aboard the Beaver, after his former vessel, HM Actaeon; Blakeney had served aboard the 26-gun frigate Actaeon during the latter's commission in China.....
