= The Philadelphia Insectarium and Butterfly Pavilion =

Insect museum in Philadelphia, Pennsylvania

Coordinates: 40.0423°N 75.0263°W

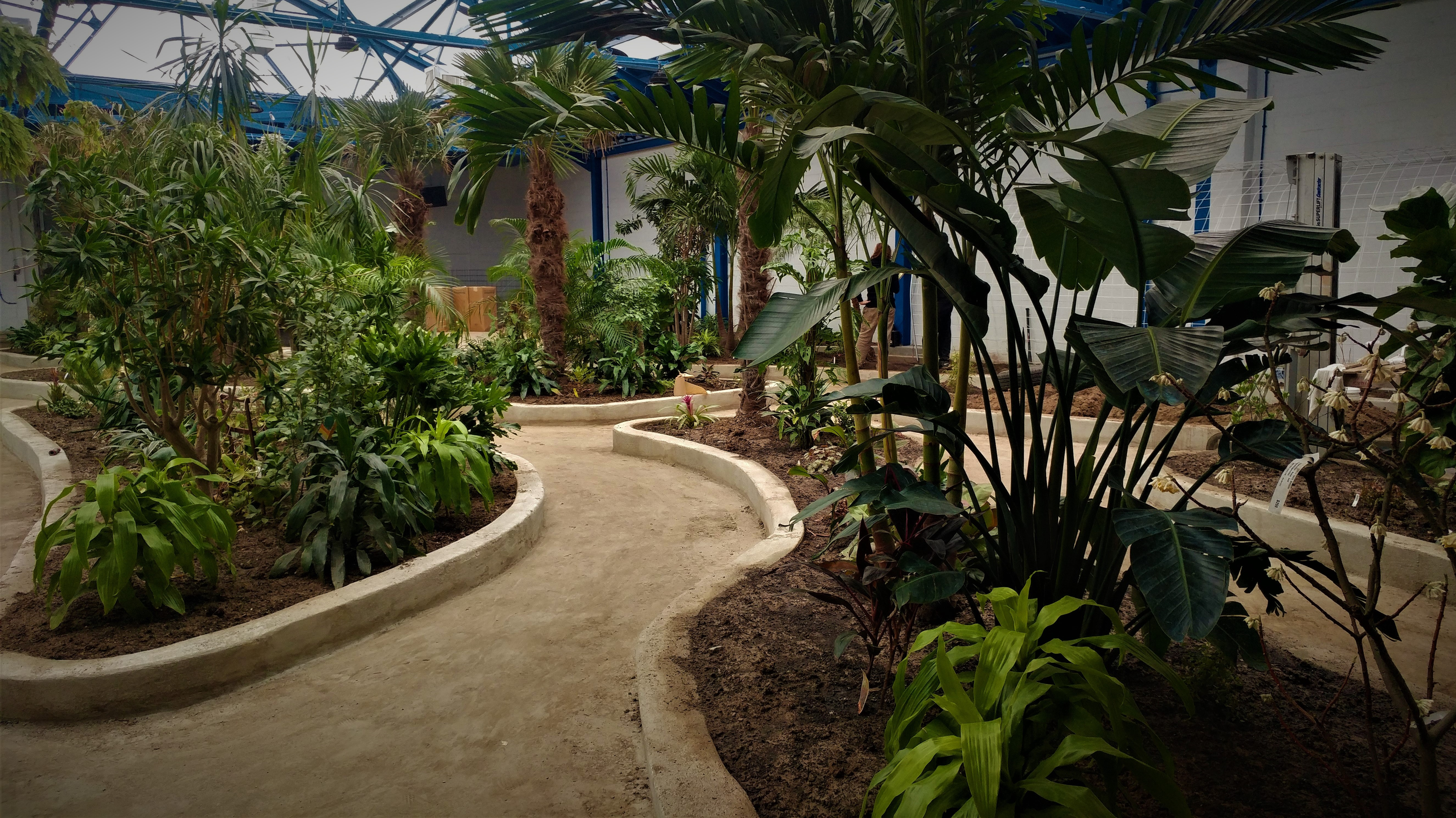
Insectarium and Butterfly Pavilion, Botanical Garden construction, January 2017

The Philadelphia Insectarium and Butterfly Pavilion was a museum about insects located in the northeast Philadelphia, Pennsylvania.

== History and features ==
The museum opened in 1992 and features displays of many types of live insects, mounted specimens, exhibits and hands-on activities. Examples of the live insects (and other arthropods) include honeybees, tarantulas, cockroaches, scorpions, spiders, praying mantis, millipedes, beetles, water bugs, ants, and crickets.

In 2017, the museum expanded and opened a 7,000-square-foot greenhouse for a year-round butterfly pavilion. At this time the business changed hands from Steve Kanya to John Cambridge.

A reported heist of rare insects and lizards occurred in 2018. Damages totaled to $40,000 and police had suspected the operation was an inside job. A lawsuit alleging defamation would later be launched in response to a documentary based on the incident, Bug Out.

The Insectarium was evicted by the sheriff on May 30, 2023, after defaulting on mortgage payments. Following the eviction, the plaintiff reported the building had been damaged. When the estate's attorney and the sheriff's deputy arrived, all the toilets, urinals, mirrors and windows were smashed. The animals from the museum had been moved to a conservation group called Wild Things Preserve. The plants and critters in the butterfly pavilion had to be destroyed pursuant to USDA licenses that governed possession of those non-native species, with John Cambridge stating “most of the tropical plants and butterflies flying throughout the first-floor pavilion will have to be killed “.
