= John Ward (Royal Navy officer) =

British Royal Navy captain and surveyor

Captain John Ward
- Born: 1825
- Died: 20 January 1896 (aged 70–71); London
- Occupations: Royal Navy captain and surveyor

John Ward (1825 – 20 January 1896) was a British Royal Navy captain and surveyor.

== Biography ==
Ward was born in 1825, was son of Lieutenant Edward Willis Ward, R.N. (d. 1855). He entered the navy in 1840 on board the Spey brig, packet-boat to the West Indies and the Gulf of Mexico. In November of the same year the Spey was wrecked on the Bahama bank, and young Ward was sent to the Thunder, then employed in surveying the Bahamas. He passed his examination in December 1848, and was promoted to the rank of lieutenant on 2 October 1850. During 1851–3 he was borne on the books of the Fisgard for surveying duties, and in March 1854 was appointed to the Alban steamer, then commanded by Captain Henry Charles Otter, and attached to the fleet in the Baltic, where she did good service in destroying telegraphs and in reconnoitring in the neighbourhood of Sveaborg and at Bomarsund. In 1855–6 he was with Otter in the Firefly, surveying on the coast of Scotland, and in February 1857 was appointed to command the Emperor, a steam-yacht going out as a present to the emperor of Japan. In this yacht he went with Lord Elgin to Yeddo, in August 1858, and, when the vessel had been handed over to the Japanese, returned to Shanghai in the Retribution.

On 24 September, he was promoted to command the HMS Actaeon, surveying ship, and in the Actaeon's tender, the Dove gunboat, he accompanied Lord Elgin in his remarkable voyage up the Yang-tse, rendering important assistance in examining the navigable channels of the river. For the next three years he commanded the Actaeon, and in her surveyed the coast of the Gulf of Pe-che-li, including the harbours of Wei-hai-wei and Ta-lien-wan, till then unknown, as also the Yang-tse for two hundred miles above Han-kow. For two years after paying off the Actaeon in the end of 1861, he was employed at the hydrographic office in reducing the work of the survey, and in March 1864 he was appointed to the Rifleman to continue the survey of the China Seas. In 1866 his health gave way, and he was obliged to return to England. He had no further service, and in 1870 accepted the new retirement scheme. On 24 September 1873 he was promoted to be captain on the retired list, and died in London on 20 January 1896, at the age of seventy. He married, in 1852, Mary Hope, daughter of John Bowie of Edinburgh, and left issue.
