= Frederick Arm =

Inlet in British Columbia, Canada

Coordinates: 50°29′N 125°16′W

Frederick Arm is an inlet on the South Coast of British Columbia, extending north from Cordero Channel between Lougborough and Bute Inlets.

Originally conferred with the name Ensenada del Estero by Spanish explorers Galiano and Valdes, its current name was given c.1864 by Captain Pender, RN (namesake of Pender Island), after Staff Commander Frederick John Owen Evans, naval hydrographer, British Admiralty. The name Estero survives in the vicinity in the form of Estero Basin, which lies between the north end of Frederick Arm and the south end of Bute Inlet and Estero Peak, on the south side of Estero Basin. "Estero" means "lagoon", while Ensenada de Estero means "Bay of the Lagoon". San Josef Mountain in the same vicinity was named for the San Josef, a prize Spanish frigate that was captured by the Royal Navy and became part of the fleet

Frederick Arm should not be confused with Frederick Sound, which is a sidewater of Seymour Inlet in the area to the north of Queen Charlotte Strait.
