= Frederick Sound (Canada) =

Sound in British Columbia

Coordinates: 51°02′10″N 126°43′10″W

Frederick Sound is a sound on the Central Coast of British Columbia, Canada. It is the largest branch of Seymour Inlet and along with that inlet was named in honour of Frederick Seymour, second governor of the Colony of British Columbia. Frederick Sound has two inlets, one named Salmon Arm and the other unnamed. The complex maze of hidden waterways forming Seymour Inlet is in the region of Queen Charlotte Strait.

Frederick Sound should not be confused with Frederick Arm, which extends north from Cordero Channel between Loughborough and Bute Inlets.
