= Phillips Estuary/ʔNacinuxʷ Conservancy =

Conservancy in British Columbia, Canada

- IUCN category II (national park)
- Location within British Columbia
- Interactive map of Phillips Estuary/ʔNacinuxʷ Conservancy
- Location: Strathcona, British Columbia, Canada
- Nearest city: Port McNeill
- Coordinates: 50°35′39″N 125°21′22″W
- Area: 1,461 ha (5.64 sq mi)
- Designation: Conservancy
- Established: 2007
- Governing body: BC Parks

The Phillips Estuary/ʔNacinuxʷ Conservancy, is a conservancy in British Columbia, Canada. It preserves parts of the estuary and of the valley of the Phillips River on the North Coast in the Strathcona Regional District. It is just north of the Matsayno #5 reserve, or M̓ac̓inuxʷ, a Kwiakah First Nation village. Established in 2007, the conservancy covers 1461 hectares of land (1382 hectares of upland and 79 hectares of foreshore). It is located approximately 60 kilometres north of the city of Campbell River. There are no settlements within the conservancy. It is contained within the M̓ac̓inuxʷ Special Forest Management Area as the Pałəmin/Estero Basin Conservancy.
