= Takush Harbour =

Coordinates: 51°17′01″N 127°37′04″W

Takush Harbour is a harbour on the south side of Smith Sound in the Central Coast region of British Columbia, Canada. Nathlegalis IR No. 3 of the Gwa'sala-'Nakwaxda'xw Nations band government of the Kwakwaka'wakw peoples is located in Browning Channel in front of the harbour. The Takush River enters Smith Sound in the same area, at Ahclakerho Channel.
