= Nekite River =

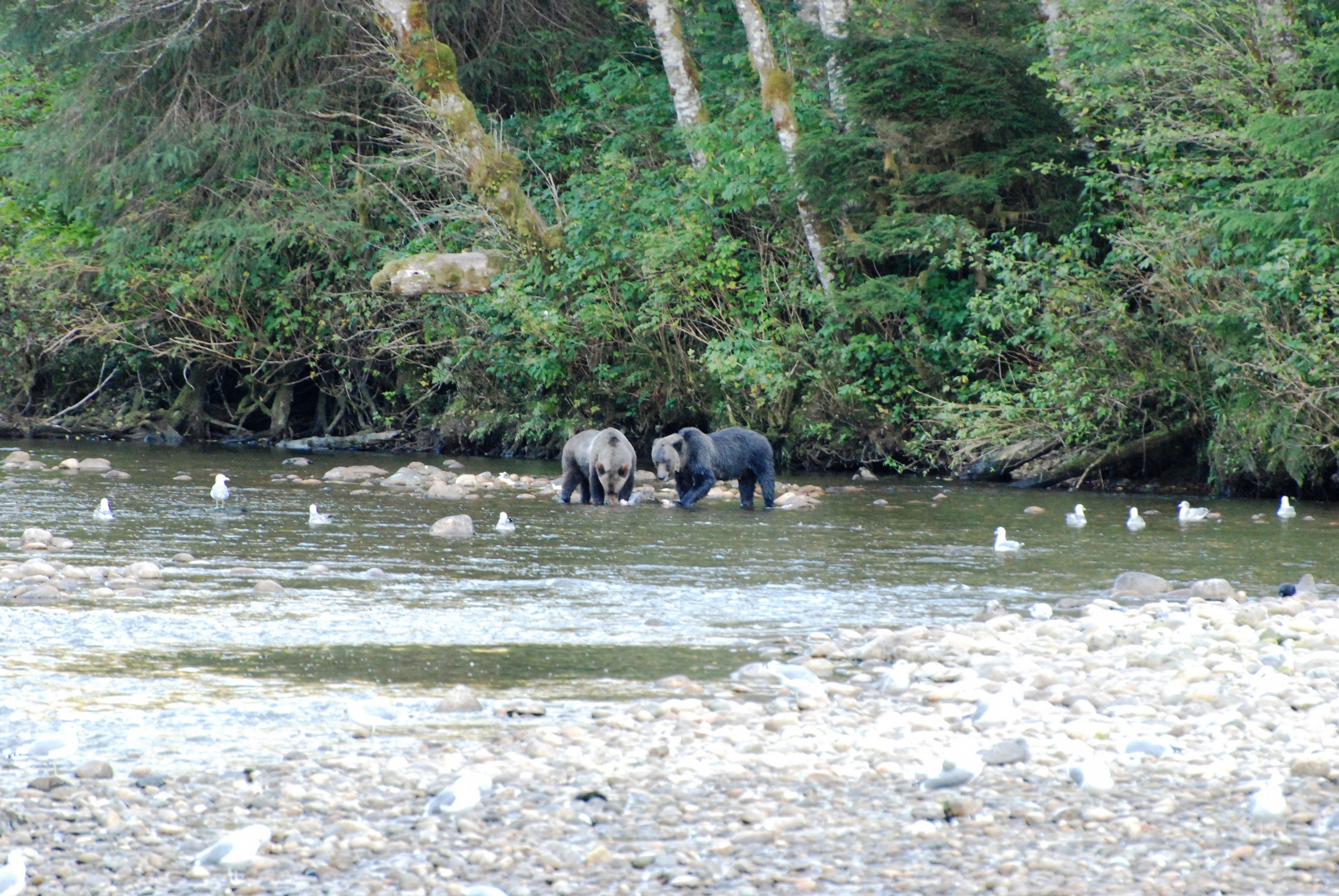
- Grizzly bears on the Nekite River

- Mouth of Nekite River

Location
- Country: Canada
- Province: British Columbia
- District: Range 2 Coast Land District

Physical characteristics
- Source: Coast Mountains
- Mouth: Smith Inlet
  - location: Smith Sound
  - coordinates: 51°23′12″N 127°6′54″W
  - elevation: 0 m (0 ft)

The Nekite River is a river in the Central Coast region of British Columbia, Canada, flowing south to the head of Smith Inlet. Nekite Indian Reserve No. 2 is located at the mouth of the river and is one of the many reserves of the Gwa'sala-'Nakwaxda'xw Nations band government located in the area of Smith Sound, of which Smith Inlet is the uppermost part.

The Piper River is a tributary of the Nekite, flowing west to meet it at 51°25′34″N 127°04′57″W. Piper Lake is an expansion of the Piper River, located a short distance above the confluence at 51°25′15″N 127°01′37″W.

== See also ==
- List of rivers of British Columbia
