= HMS Actaeon (1831) =

Frigate of the Royal Navy

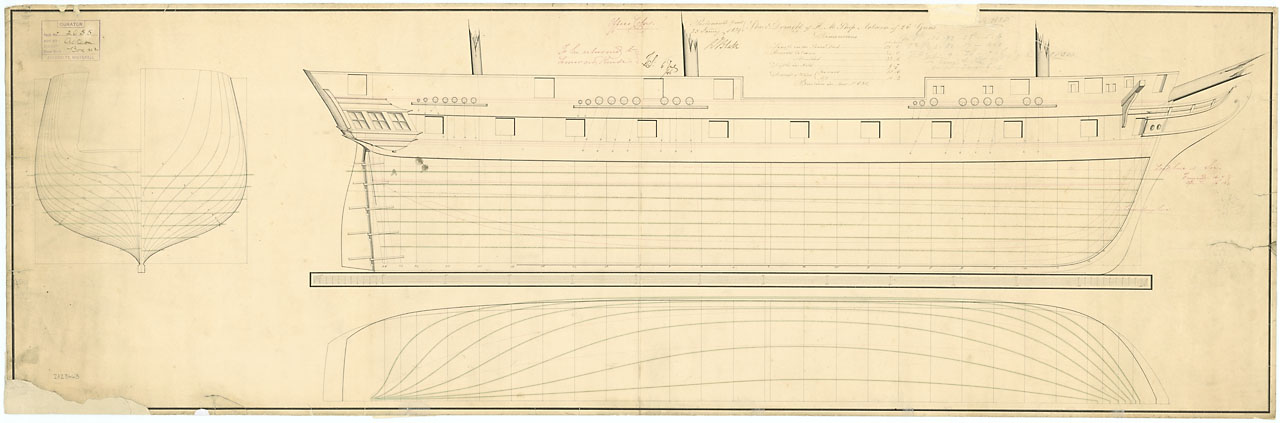
- A design plan of Actaeon signed by Richard Blake (master shipwright, Portsmouth Dockyard, 1835–1844).

History

United Kingdom
- Name: HMS Actaeon
- Ordered: 23 October 1827
- Builder: Portsmouth Dockyard
- Laid down: September 1828
- Launched: 31 January 1831
- Commissioned: 16 April 1831
- Reclassified: Survey ship in 1856; Hospital ship in 1866; Hulked in February 1870
- Fate: Sold for breaking up in February 1889

General characteristics
- Class & type: Sixth-rate frigate
- Tons burthen: 620 bm
- Length: 121 ft 6 in (37.03 m) (overall); 100 ft 4 in (30.58 m) (keel)
- Beam: 34 ft (10.4 m)
- Draught: 9 ft 7 in (2.92 m)
- Propulsion: Sails
- Sail plan: Full-rigged ship
- Complement: 175
- Armament: 26 guns; Upper deck: 20 × 32-pounder gunnades; Quarter deck: 4 × 32-pounder carronades; Forecastle: 2 × 9-pounder (or 2 × 32-pounder carronades)

HMS Actaeon was a 26-gun sixth-rate frigate of the Royal Navy.

== Career ==
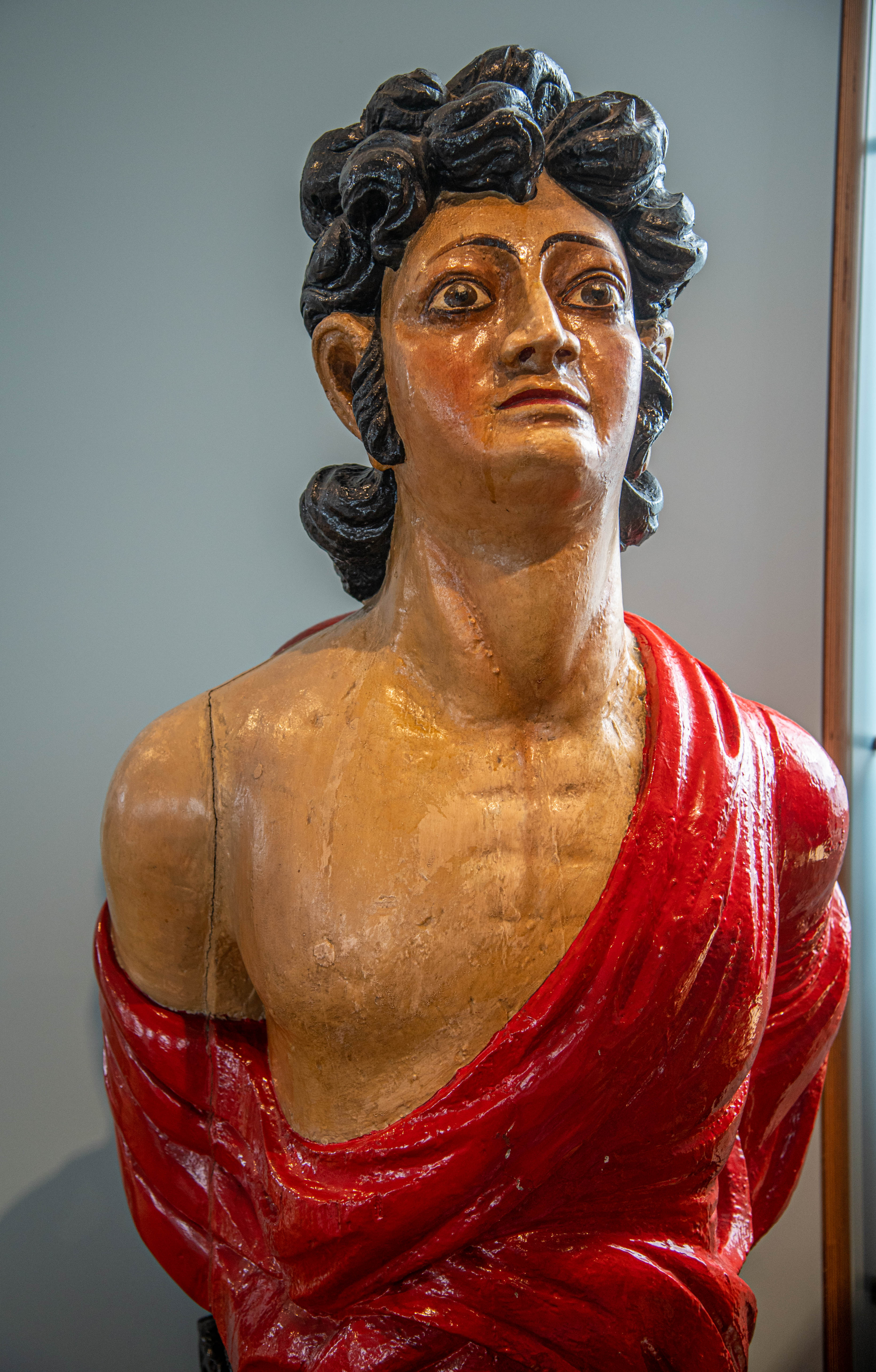
Actaeon figurehead

Actaeon was designed in 1827 by the School of Naval Architecture, and launched from Portsmouth Dockyard on 31 January 1831. She was first commissioned in November 1830 under Captain Frederick William Grey for service in the Mediterranean. On 5 November 1831 she rescued the crew of Ariel, which was wrecked near Brindisi, Kingdom of the Two Sicilies. Ariel was on a voyage from Trieste to Greenock, Renfrewshire.

After serving in the Mediterranean Actaeon served off South America from November 1834 under Captain Lord Edward Russell. She was assigned to the British Pacific Squadron, arriving at Valparaíso in July 1836. She was involved in the charting of the Acteon Group: a group of islands that Russell named after this vessel. By 1838 she was back at Portsmouth under the command of Robert Russell, who sailed her back to South America in August that year.

On 23 July 1840, she ran aground at Buenos Aires, Argentina, whilst on a voyage from that port to Montevideo, Uruguay. She was refloated with assistance from USS Marion, French Navy, and Royal Navy vessels.

=== West Africa Squadron ===
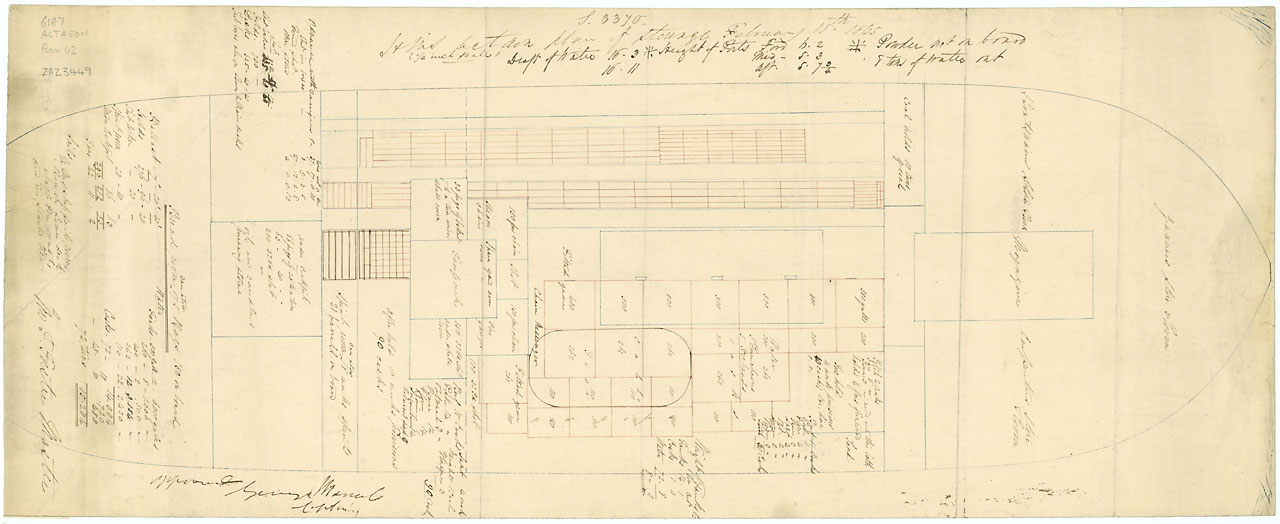
Stowage plan on board the Actaeon in 1845

Actaeon returned to Plymouth in 1844, before departing under Captain George Mansel in December 1844 to join the West Africa Squadron. Whilst serving on this post, she captured the slavers Gago (19 December 1845), Esparanca (26 December 1845), unknown vessel (3 April 1846), Olivia (23 May 1846) and Astrea and Maria Theresa (9 September 1847).

=== Survey vessel ===
Actaeon was paid off at Portsmouth in 1848, but was recommissioned again in 1857 to serve as a survey vessel off "the coast of China and Tartary", under the command of Captain William Thornton Bate. On 7 July, Actaeon ran aground on a reef in the Gaspar Strait (1°39′48″S 106°37′58″E) and was damaged. She was then present at the bombardment of Canton in 1857, during the Second Opium War, where Bate was shot and killed on 29 December. Robert Jenkins replaced Bate on 30 December, and then John Ward took command on 1 March 1858. Ward carried out surveys for further military operations in August 1859, before returning to Britain. Actaeon was at Shanghai on the night of 7 April 1861 for the British census. Actaeon Sound in the Queen Charlotte Strait region of British Columbia, Canada, was named for Actaeon in 1865. with many neighbouring features named in association with its crew and captain in the general area of Drury Inlet. Actaeon was then out of commission at Portsmouth in 1866, becoming a hospital ship. She was hulked in 1870 and lent to the Cork Harbour Board, before being sold at Portsmouth in February 1889 for breaking up.

== Figurehead ==
The figurehead for Actaeon was carved by the Dickerson family of Devonport, Plymouth, most likely by Frederick who took over as master carver in 1830. It was presented to Portsmouth Dock by John Read, who had purchased the ship for breaking up.
