= William Thornton Bate =

Captain William Thornton Bate FRAS
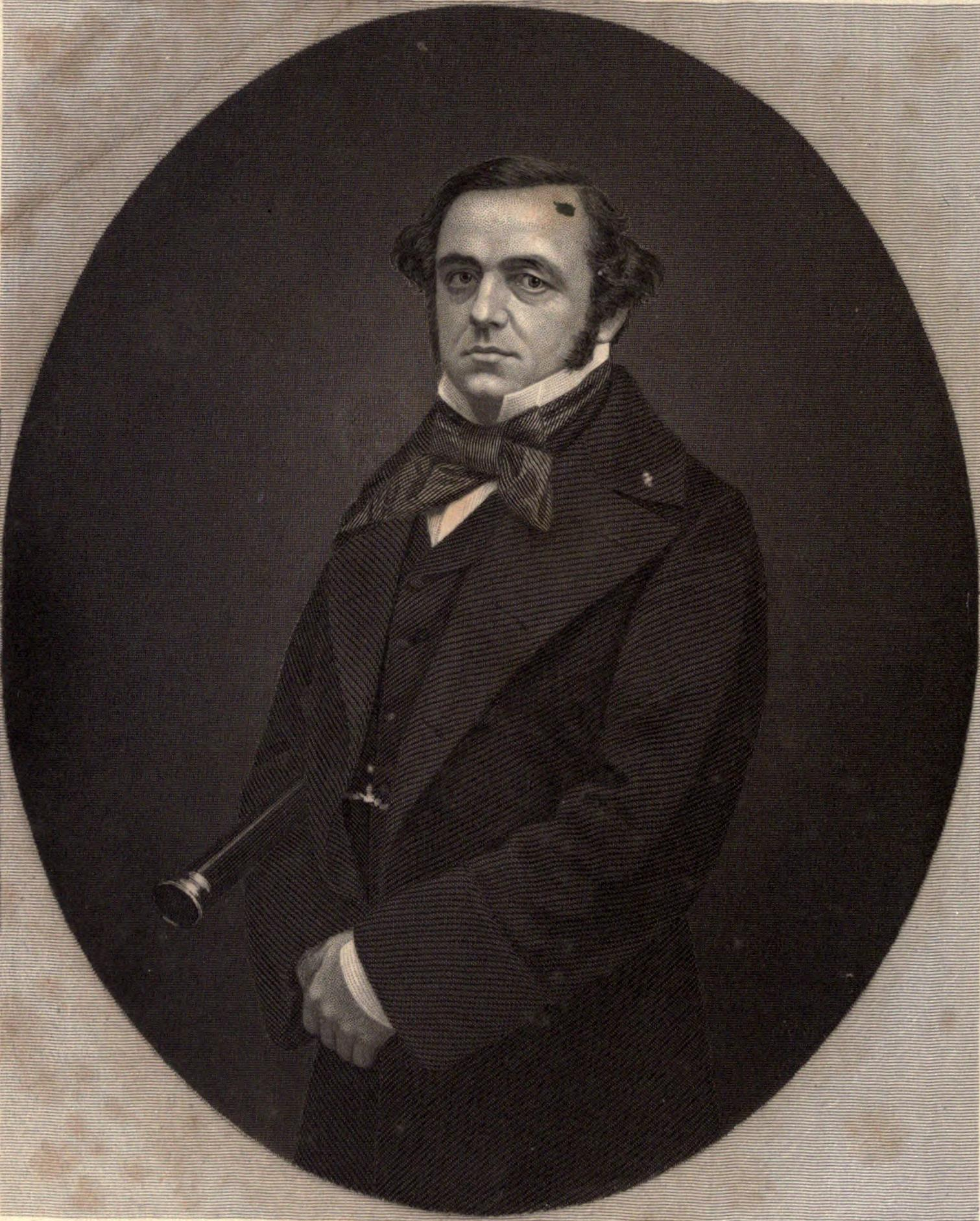
- Engraving of Bate (published 1862)
- Born: 31 January 1818; Chatham, Kent, England
- Died: 29 December 1857 (aged 39); Canton, Guangdong, China
- Burial place: Hong Kong Cemetery
- Military career
- Allegiance: United Kingdom
- Branch: Royal Navy
- Service years: 1833–1857
- Rank: Captain
- Commands: HMS Royalist; HMS Bittern; HMS Actaeon
- Conflicts: First Anglo-Chinese War; Second Anglo-Chinese War

William Thornton Bate (31 January 1818 – 29 December 1857) was a British Royal Navy officer and surveyor. He served in First Anglo-Chinese War and Second Anglo-Chinese War. He died during the Battle of Canton in 1857.

== Early life ==
Bate was born in 1818, the son of the Governor of Ascension Island. He entered the Royal Naval College in Portsmouth at the age of 13, spending two years studying there. He was then appointed as a midshipman aboard HMS Isis, and sailed with her to the Cape of Good Hope. He spent five years at the Cape, transferring to HMS Britannia and then, on his passing his lieutenant's exam, to HMS Blenheim. He sailed with the Blenheim to the China Station. While serving there, the First Opium War broke out. A party of men from Blenheim was landed to attack Chinese positions. Bate was one of those involved, helping to capture a fort, but being wounded in the neck as he did so. For his actions, he was promoted to lieutenant on 11 October 1841.

== Surveying career ==
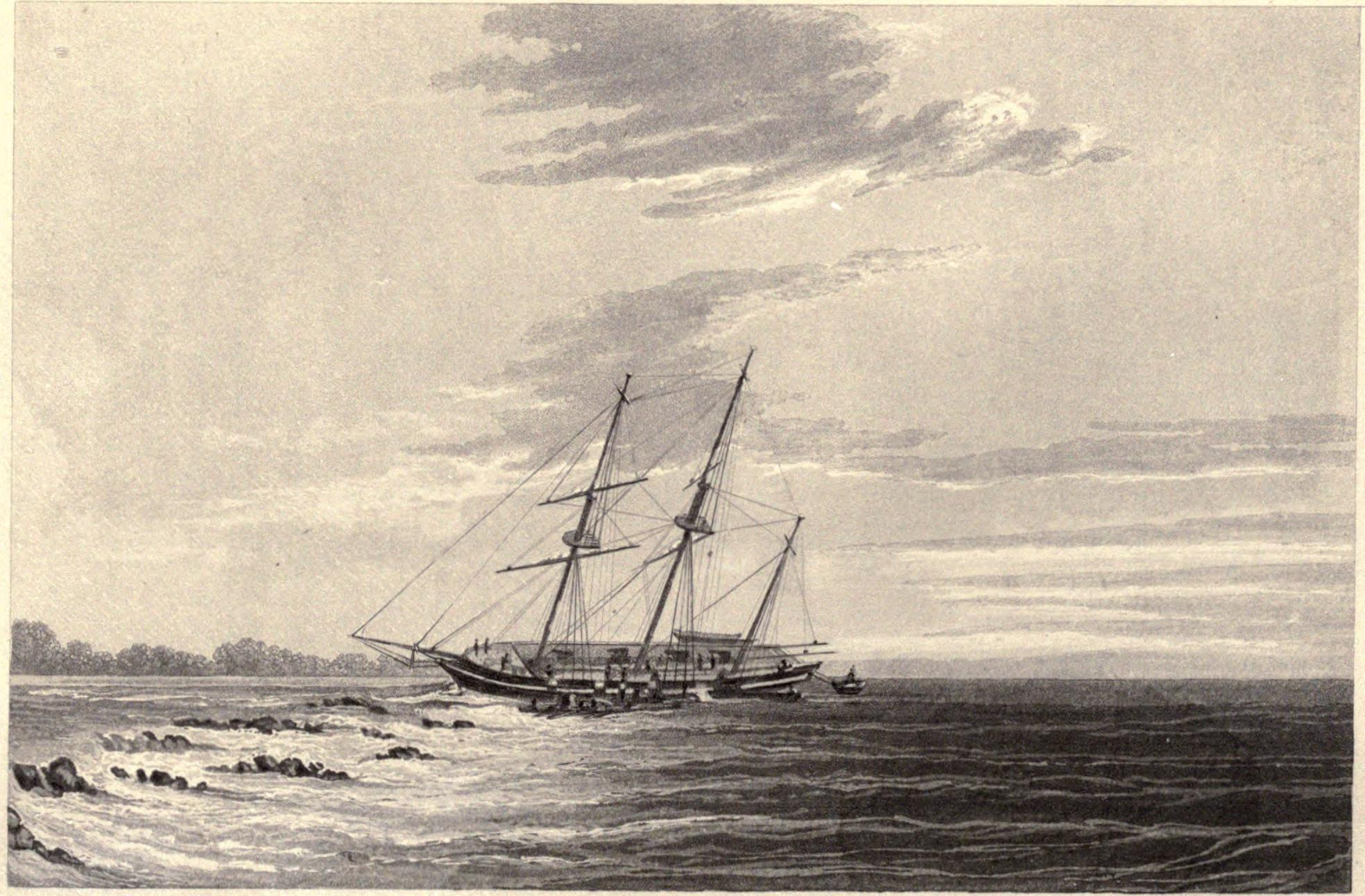
HMS Royalist on a coral reef

In autumn 1842, Bate was assigned to Commander Collinson on HMS Bentinck, who had been tasked with surveying the waters around the Chinese coast. In May 1842, he was involved in the attack on Chapu. Collinson was responsible for surveying the approaches to Chapu, and once the troops were landed, Bate accompanied them. He was involved in a hand-to-hand battle with a Chinese defender. Bate captured him, then opened the gates of the fort to the British, at which the Chinese fled. This earned him a Mention in Despatches from Vice Admiral William Parker who commanded the force. He returned to England in 1846, and took a series of scientific courses at the colleges at Woolwich and Portsmouth. He was promoted to Commander in 1848 and given command of HMS Royalist, with which he was to carry out further surveys of the Chinese coast. He was elected a Fellow of the Royal Astronomical Society on 9 March 1849. He was taken ill with smallpox in 1852, but recovered and was able to complete his surveys, including one of the island of Palawan. After completing these tasks, Bate returned to England. In January 1856 he was appointed to command HMS Bittern, and to return to Chinese waters to conduct further surveys. He took command in April that year, but it was soon found that the Bittern was unsuitable to the task. Bate sent her back to Britain, transferring his command to the sixth rate HMS Actaeon, while he awaited the arrival of his new ship.

While cruising off the Chinese coast, the Arrow incident occurred, the prelude to the Second Opium War, and the British decided to bombard the port of Canton. Bate was put in charge of the landing parties, and whilst overseeing operations from HMS Barracouta, was struck on the hand by some shot, and was slightly wounded. After the subduing of resistance, Bate took over and garrisoned a fort with 300 men. He held the fort under siege for five months, before the Admiralty ordered him to evacuate. He returned to the Actaeon, then at Hong Kong. As a reward for his services, he was promoted to captain. Bate returned to Canton in November 1857, and delivered Lord Elgin's ultimatum to the Chinese officials. There being no reply, the navy began to bombard the port on 28 December.

== Death ==
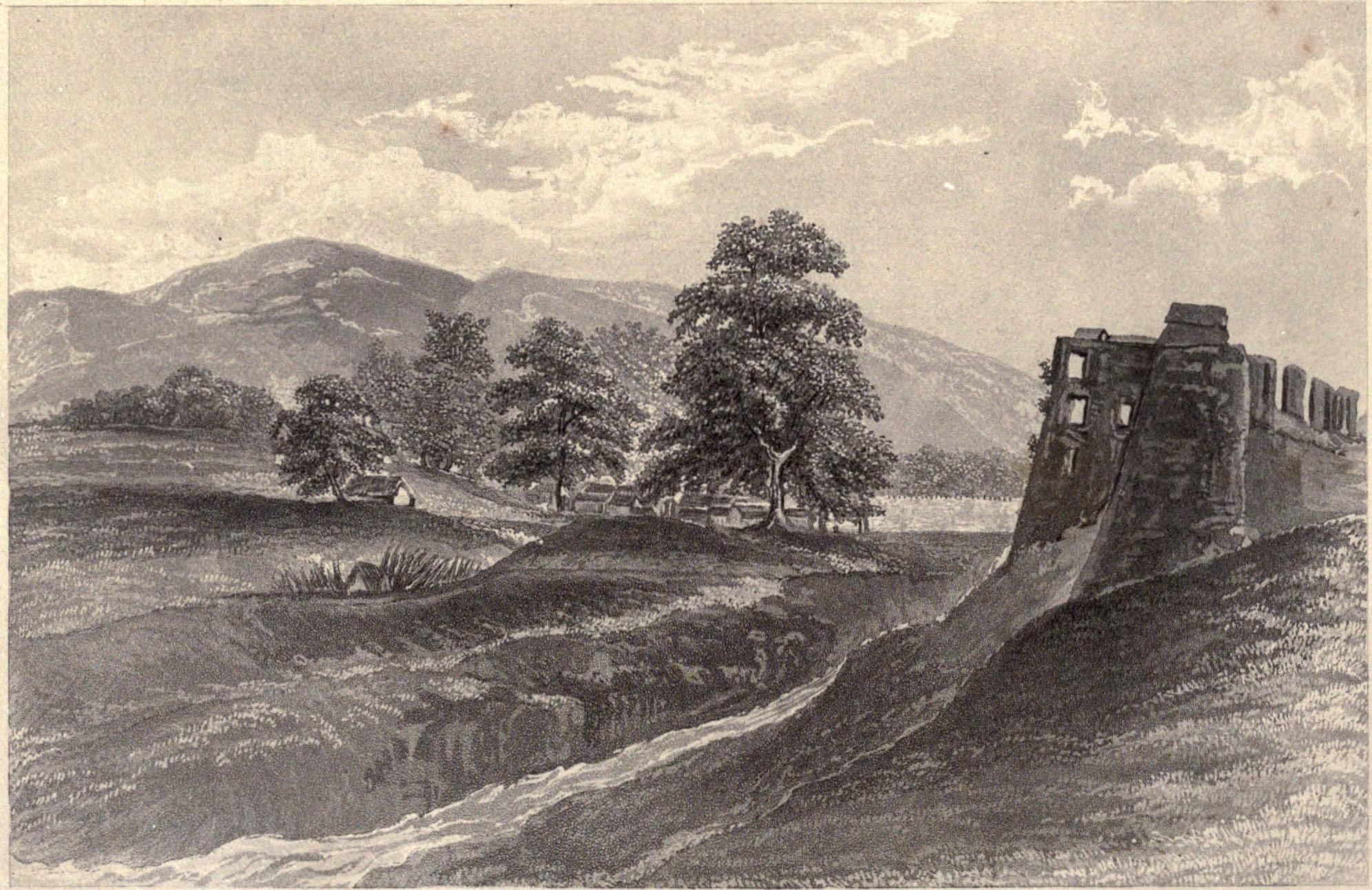
The spot where Bate died in Canton

In the Battle of Canton, Bate volunteered to lead a party in storming the walls of the city. After landing, he was determining the height of the wall to be scaled with his sextant but was hit in the right breast by a ball fired from a jingal. He died half an hour later. Admiral Michael Seymour wrote to the Admiralty after the capture of Canton:

2. Our gratification at this quick success with trifling losses has been damped by a great calamity, in the death of Captain William Thornton Bate, of Her Majesty's ship Actaeon, who was killed by a gingall ball whilst reconnoitring a suitable spot for placing our scaling ladders. 3.This sad event had placed a gloom over the whole force, Captain Bate being no less beloved for his many virtues, than respected and admired for his professional ability. By the death of Captain Bate, Her Majesty has lost a most zealous, able and faithful servant.

He was buried in Hong Kong Cemetery at Happy Valley, Hong Kong.

== Legacy ==
Bate's strong Christian views led to him becoming lionised as a Christian hero. Reverend John Baillie published A Memoir of Captain W. Thornton Bate, R.N in 1859. Charles Rogers included a biography of Bate in Christian Heroes in the Army and Navy in 1867. A memorial was erected in St Ann's Church in Portsea, as well as in the grounds of St. John's Cathedral, Hong Kong Island.

Bate Head (Tuen Tsui) Peninsula in Sai Kung is named after him. Mount Bate on Vancouver Island, British Columbia, was probably named after him by Captain George Henry Richards.
