= Compton Island =

Island in British Columbia, Canada

Coordinates: 50°35′41″N 126°41′00″W

Compton Island is an island in the Queen Charlotte Strait-Johnstone Strait region of the Central Coast of British Columbia, Canada, in Blackfish Sound to the east of Port McNeill All of it and three small adjacent islands comprise Compton Island Indian Reserve No. 6, a.k.a. Compton 6.

== Name origin ==
Compton Island was named about 1866 by Captain Pender for Pym Nevin Compton of Hampshire. From a Quaker family, she came to Victoria in the employ of the Hudson's Bay Company, working as a clerk. He was serving as a trading clerk on the Labouchere when he was taken captive by natives in Alaska in August 1862. He was stationed at Port Simpson (Lax Kw'alaams today) and at Fort Rupert where he was in charge. He returned to England in 1866 on the Hudson's Bay's Prince of Wales, but a few years later was in California, returning to Victoria afterwards, where he dies in 1879. Compton Point at the entrance to Wells Passage was also named for him.

== See also ==
- List of islands of British Columbia
- List of Indian reserves in British Columbia
- Compton
