= Compton Point =

Headland in British Columbia, Canada

Coordinates: 50°53′09″N 126°53′45″W

Compton Point is a headland in the Queen Charlotte Strait region of the Central Coast of British Columbia, Canada, forming the northwest entrance point to Wells Passage opposite North Broughton Island.

== Name origin ==
Compton Point, like Compton Island at the southeast end of Queen Charlotte Strait, was named about 1866 by Captain Pender for Pym Nevin Compton of Hampshire. From a Quaker family, she came to Victoria in the employ of the Hudson's Bay Company, working as a clerk. He was serving as a trading clerk on the Labouchere when he was taken captive by natives in Alaska in August 1862. He was stationed at Port Simpson (Lax Kw'alaams today) and at Fort Rupert where he was in charge. He returned to England in 1866 on the Hudson's Bay's Prince of Wales, but a few years later was in California, returning to Victoria afterwards, where he dies in 1879. Compton Point at the entrance to Wells Passage was also named for him.
