= Nugent Sound =

Sound in British Columbia

Coordinates: 51°05′20″N 127°18′15″W

Nugent Sound is a sound on the Central coast of British Columbia, Canada. It is located between Seymour Inlet to the west and Belize Inlet to the east.
