= Bug Out (TV series) =

2022 American true crime television series

- Promotional poster
- Genre: Documentary; True crime
- Directed by: Ben Feldman
- Starring: John Cambridge; Steve Kanya
- Country of origin: United States
- Original language: English
- No. of seasons: 1
- No. of episodes: 4

Production
- Executive producers: Ben Feldman; Jenner Furst; Michael Gasparro; Julia Willoughby Nason
- Producer: Marc D'Agostino
- Production locations: Philadelphia, Pennsylvania
- Running time: 35 minutes
- Production company: The Cinemart

Original release
- Network: IMDb TV
- Release: March 4, 2022

Bug Out is an American true crime television series investigating a heist of rare live insects at the Philadelphia Insectarium & Butterfly Pavilion. It premiered on IMDb TV on March 4, 2022.

== Summary ==
The series tells the story of the unsolved heist of $50,000 worth of rare live insects from the Philadelphia Insectarium & Butterfly Pavilion, the first bug zoo in the United States. It explores the underworld of exotic bug smugglers, and the Federal agents who pursue them, focusing on the day in August 2018 when the head of the museum, John Cambridge, arrived at work and realized some 7,000 live bugs had been stolen. It was the biggest insect heist on record, with many of the missing bugs rare, large, or deadly, including scorpions, tarantulas, rhinoceros cockroaches, and a six-eyed sand spider.

Series creator Ben Feldman was working as a lawyer in Philadelphia when he heard about the heist. The series evolved from the 2019 documentary Flea Market, which examined the same subject and was also directed by Feldman.

== Cast ==
- John Cambridge
- Steve Kanya
- Kevin Wiley
- Wlodek Lapkiewicz
- Michael Kinzler
- Chris Tomasetto
- Alison Mumper

== Episodes ==
No.	Title	Original release date
1	"The Buglary"	4 March 2022
When thousands of live insects worth over $50,000 are stolen, detectives investigate an underworld of bug collectors and insect dealers.
2	"Going Underground"	4 March 2022
While the detectives interview suspects to learn more about the museum and its odd history, federal agencies are brought on the scene to share case files from other bug busts.
3	"Colony Collapse"	4 March 2022
A clearer picture of the Insectarium starts to develop as the detectives begin to home in on a prime suspect.
4	"Under the Magnifying Glass"	4 March 2022
A shocking revelation emerges about the bug heist. The investigators find themselves questioning everything they thought they knew about this case.

== Release ==
The trailer was released on January 25, 2022. The four-part series premiered on IMDb TV on March 4, 2022.

=== Lawsuit ===
After the video's release, the Philadelphia Insectarium and Butterfly Pavilion filed a lawsuit against the director and all parties involved in release of the video, including Amazon. The case was settled in September 2024 and the video was removed from sites where it had been available. A docket showing the filings of the parties is available on the court's website at https://fjdefile.phila.gov. Request INFORMATION then CASE INFORMATION and then CP Trial Division-Civil Dockets. Accept the court's disclaimers. Select Display Civil Docket Report. The Case ID: is 220502657. They also want you to prove you are not a robot. The document displayed is the docket for the case. September 20, 2024 entries show that the case was settled prior to trial. Links in blue on the docket are to documents filed. The court wants 25 cents per page.
