= Smith Sound (British Columbia) =

- Location in British Columbia
- Location: British Columbia, Canada
- Coordinates: 51°18′00″N 127°40′00″W
- Type: Sound
- Ocean/sea sources: Pacific Ocean

Smith Sound is a sound on the Central Coast of British Columbia, Canada, located to the south of Rivers Inlet and between the Queen Charlotte Strait region (S) and Fitz Hugh Sound (N).

Smith Sound is the traditional home and territory of the Gwa'sala group of Kwakwakaʼwakw, who are today organized with the 'Nak'waxda'xw (Nakoaktok) into the Gwa'sala-'Nakwaxda'xw Nations band government. Indian reserves on Smith Sound and Smith Inlet under their governance are:

- Ann Island IR No. 7, on Ann Island, 10.10 ha.
- Halowis IR No. 5, at the mouth of Smokehouse Creek at the head of Long Lake, 3.60 ha.
- Nekite IR No. 2, at the mouth of the Nekite River, which is at the head of Smith Inlet, 66.80 ha.
- Nathlegalis IR No. 3, comprising Indian Island and five smaller islands in Takush Harbour, which is on the south side of Smith Sound, 134.40 ha.
- Toksee IR No. 4, at the junction of Long Lake and Wyclees Lagoon, 5.60 ha.
- Tseetsum-Sawlasilah IR No. 6, on the north shore of Naysash Inlet, which branches off the north side of Smith Inlet, 2.10 ha.
- Wyclese IR No. 1, on the south shore of Smith Sound at the entrance to Wyclees Lagoon, 223 ha.
