= Seymour River (Seymour Inlet) =

Coordinates: 51°11′35″N 126°40′21″W

The Seymour River, one of three by that name in the province of British Columbia, Canada, is a river in the Central Coast region, flowing south out of the Pacific Ranges of the Coast Mountains into the head of Seymour Inlet, the largest of a maze of inland waterways within a relatively low area of the British Columbia mainland on the northwest side of the Queen Charlotte Strait region.

== See also ==
- List of rivers of British Columbia
- Seymour River (disambiguation)
