= Wells Passage =

Strait in British Columbia, Canada

Coordinates: 50°51′20″N 126°55′14″W

Wells Passage is a strait and marine waterway in the northeastern Queen Charlotte Strait region of the Central Coast of British Columbia, Canada, on the west side of North Broughton Island. Across from that island, the headland at the northwest entrance to the passage is Compton Point.
