= Central Coast Regional District =

Regional district in British Columbia, Canada

Coordinates: 52°10′00″N 127°00′00″W

Central Coast Ocean Falls (1968–1976)
- Regional district
- Central Coast Regional District
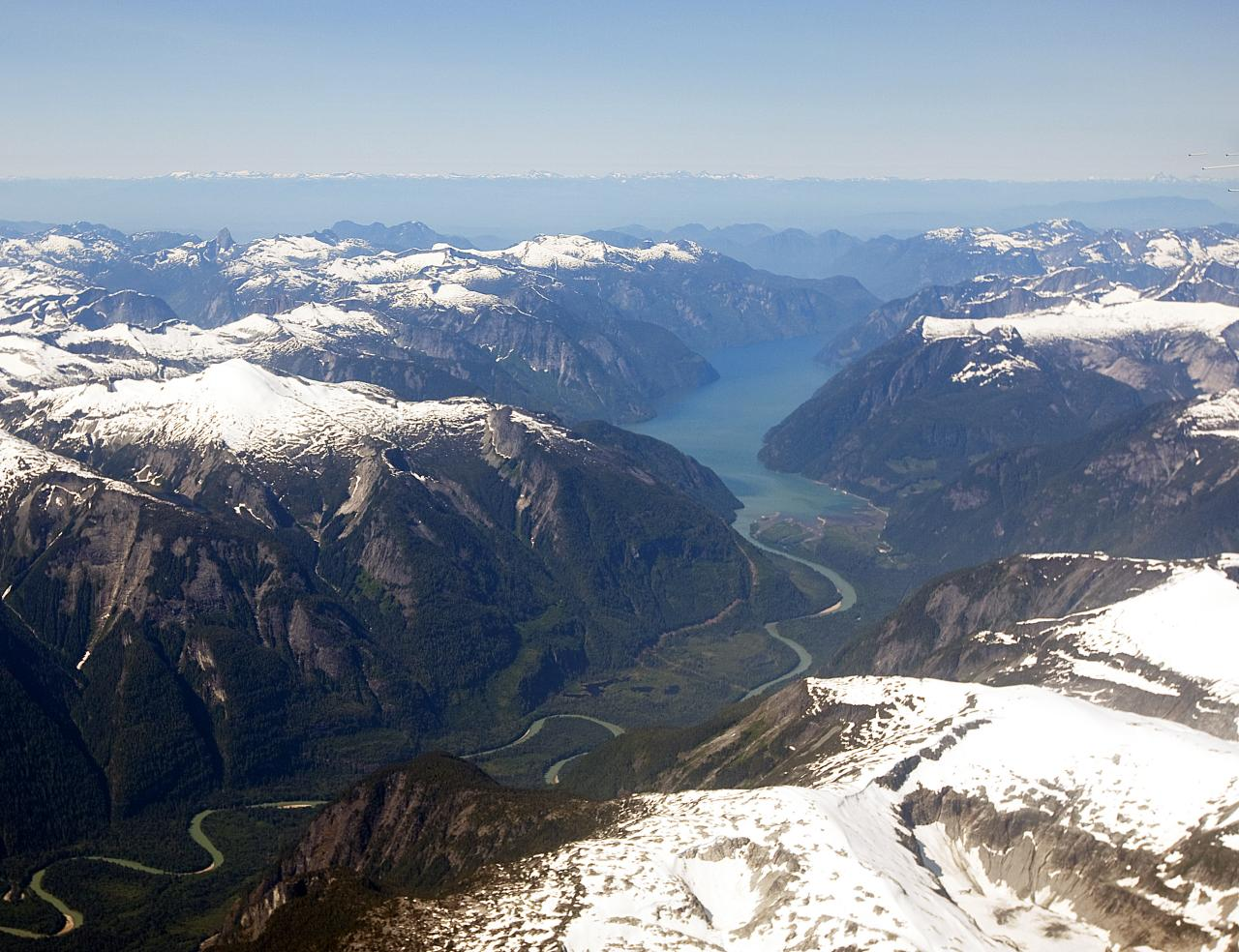
- Bella Coola valley

- Logo
- Motto: That we may be good people together
- Location in British Columbia
- Country: Canada
- Province: British Columbia
- Administrative office location: Bella Coola

Government
  - Type: Regional district
  - Body: Board of directors
  - Chair: TBD
  - Electoral areas: A; B; C; D; E

Area
  - Land: 24,491.85 km^{2} (9,456.36 sq mi)

Population (2016)
  - Total: 3,319
  - Density: 0.14/km^{2} (0.36/sq mi)
- Website: www.ccrd.ca

Central Coast Regional District is a regional district in British Columbia, Canada. It has a total land area of 24,559.5 km^{2} (9,482.5 sq mi). When it was created in 1968, it was known as the Ocean Falls Regional District, named for the then-largest town in the region, the company town of Ocean Falls, which has since become a ghost town. The district name was confirmed in 1974, but changed to Central Coast Regional District in 1976.

== Demographics ==
As a census division in the 2021 Census of Population conducted by Statistics Canada, the Central Coast Regional District had a population of 3,582 living in 1,381 of its 1,671 total private dwellings, a change of 7.9% from its 2016 population of 3,319. With a land area of 24,433.73 km^{2} (9,433.92 sq mi), it had a population density of 0.1/km^{2} (0.4/sq mi) in 2021.

Panethnic groups in the Central Coast Regional District (2001−2021)
Panethnic group	2021		2016		2011		2006		2001	
Panethnic group	Pop.	%	Pop.	%	Pop.	%	Pop.	%	Pop.	%
Indigenous	2,370	66.67%	2,040	61.82%	2,070	65.09%	1,990	62.58%	2,245	59.39%
European (Note: Statistic includes all persons that did not make up part of a visible minority or an indigenous identity.)	1,130	31.79%	1,200	36.36%	1,080	33.96%	1,155	36.32%	1,485	39.29%
East Asian (Note: Statistic includes total responses of "Chinese", "Korean", and "Japanese" under visible minority section on census.)	20	0.56%	30	0.91%	0	0%	25	0.79%	25	0.66%
Southeast Asian (Note: Statistic includes total responses of "Filipino" and "Southeast Asian" under visible minority section on census.)	15	0.42%	10	0.3%	0	0%	0	0%	0	0%
Latin American	10	0.28%	10	0.3%	0	0%	0	0%	10	0.26%
African	10	0.28%	0	0%	0	0%	0	0%	15	0.4%
South Asian	0	0%	0	0%	0	0%	0	0%	10	0.26%
Other (Note: Statistic includes total responses of "Visible minority, n.i.e." and "Multiple visible minorities" under visible minority section on census.)	0	0%	0	0%	25	0.79%	0	0%	10	0.26%
Total responses	3,555	99.25%	3,300	99.43%	3,180	99.19%	3,180	99.72%	3,780	99.97%
Total population	3,582	100%	3,319	100%	3,206	100%	3,189	100%	3,781	100%

- Note: Totals greater than 100% due to multiple origin responses.

== Government ==
The Central Coast Regional District (CCRD) is unique in the province in that it has no incorporated municipalities within its borders. The Regional District has five Electoral Areas, each of which elect a single director to the District's Board of Directors. According to the 2021 Census, the populations of the electoral areas are:

Electoral Area	Population	Board Director	Notes	Ref.
A (Outer Coast, except "Bella Bella 1" Indian Reserve)	149	Steve Emery (2022–present)		
B ("Bella Bella 1" Indian Reserve)	1,193	Dawn Hall (2026–present)		
C (Bella Coola Valley east of Augsburg Church)	661	Rita Svisdahl (2026–present)		
D (Bella Coola Valley between Tatsquan Creek and Augsburg Church, including "Bella Coola 1" Indian Reserve)	403	Garrett Newkirk (2026–present)		
E (Non-Reserve area of Bella Coola townsite)	162	Kelly Nestegard (2026–present)		
