= Schooner Channel =

Strait in British Columbia

Coordinates: 51°04′00″N 127°32′00″W

Schooner Channel, formerly Schooner Passage, is a strait on the east side of Bramham Island in the Central Coast region of British Columbia, Canada.

Nearby, Allison Harbour was formerly known as False Schooner Passage.
