= Smith Inlet (British Columbia) =

Fjord in the Central Coast region of British Columbia, Canada

- Location in British Columbia
- Location: British Columbia, Canada
- Coordinates: 51°18′02″N 127°17′07″W
- Type: Fjord
- Primary outflows: Smith Sound

Smith Inlet is an inlet at the head of Smith Sound on the Central Coast of British Columbia, Canada. Smith Inlet and Smith Sound are notable as the home of the Gwaʼsala group of the Kwakwakaʼwakw peoples, who are also known as the Smith Inlet people. Nekite Indian Reserve No. 2, which is under the governance of the Gwaʼsala-ʼNakwaxdaʼxw Nations band government, is located at the head of Smith Inlet, at the mouth of the Nekite River.

Smith Inlet is the childhood home of figure skater and magician Greg Ladret and world and Olympic team member Doug Ladret.

== History ==
Peter Puget and Joseph Whidbey, two of George Vancouver's officers during his 1791-95 expedition, first charted the inlet in 1792.
