= Blunden Harbour =

Coordinates: 50°54′N 127°17′W

Blunden Harbour is a small harbour and native Indian reserve in the Canadian province of British Columbia. It is located the mainland side of Queen Charlotte Strait about 25 kilometres (16 mi) northeast of Port Hardy. Blunden Harbour was the location of a Kwakwaka'wakw village, whose residents referred to themselves as the 'Nak'waxda'xw and are known historically as the Nakoaktok.

== History ==
The location was named Blunden Harbour in 1863 by Daniel Pender, R.N., Captain of H.M. hired surveying vessel Beaver, after his 2nd Master Edward Raynor Blunden. Blunden Island, Blunden Rock and Blunden Passage are also named for Blunden.

Although they moved about in the area between Cape Caution, Blunden Harbour and Seymour Inlet, by 1884 the 'Nak'waxda'xw had established a winter village at Blunden Harbour. The Kwak'wala name for this location is alternatively written as Ba'as, Ba'a's, Paas, or Pahas. The official name of the Indian reserve is Pahas Indian Reserve 3.

In the first two decades of the 20th century, the area was promoted to European settlers under the name of Port Progress. Settlement was short-lived and the name is not an official place name of Canada, though it still appears as a place name in several online databases including Google Earth.

In 1964, the community was forced to relocate to Port Hardy after the Canadian Department of Indian and Northern Affairs threatened to cut off support for housing, education, and services if they remained in their isolated location. The village was burnt to the ground before the community had left in boats. This was to ensure they would not return.

== Art and film ==
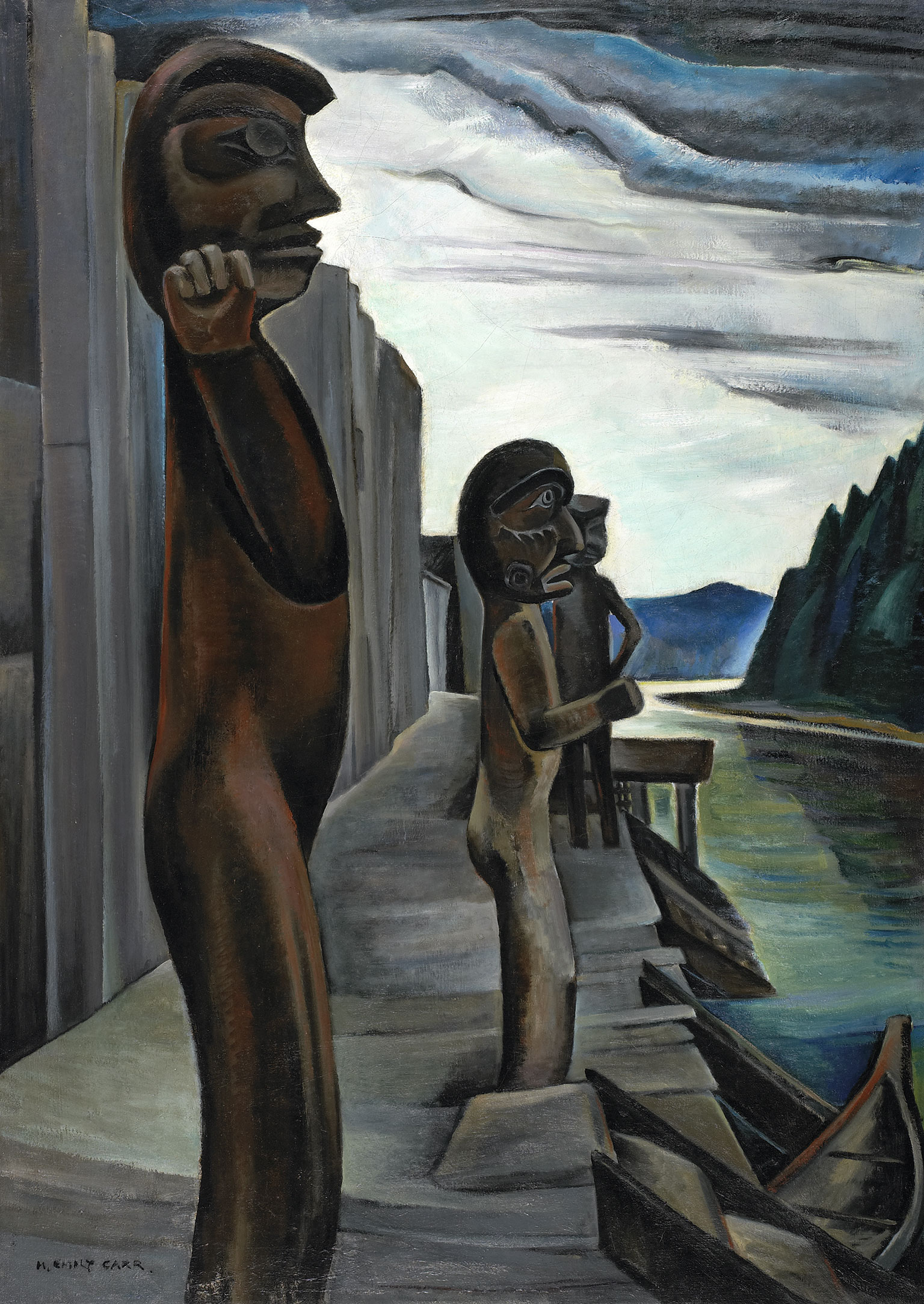
Emily Carr's Blunden Harbour totems

Blunden Harbour was home to a well-known school of Kwakwaka'wakw artists, the most notable being Willie Seaweed.

Blunden Harbour is the title of an Emily Carr painting, based on a 1901 photograph taken by Dr Charles F. Newcombe of the village. The painting was made between 1927 and 1932 and is currently on display in the National Gallery of Canada.

Blunden Harbour is also the title of a 22 min anthropological film by made by Robert Gardner in 1951. In it, Gardner inaccurately describes the location of Blunden Harbour as being "a small village on the coast of Vancouver Island."

== See also ==
- List of Indian reserves in British Columbia
- List of Kwakwaka'wakw villages
