= Seymour Inlet =

Inlet in British Columbia, Canada

- Location in British Columbia
- Location: British Columbia, Canada
- Coordinates: 51°03′57″N 126°59′14″W
- Type: Fjord
- Ocean/sea sources: Pacific Ocean

Seymour Inlet is one of the lesser travelled of the principal inlets of the British Columbia Coast. Unlike larger inlets such as Knight or Bute, it is not flanked by mountains but by relatively low, but still rugged, coastal hill-country and forms a maze of complex, narrow waterways and tidal pools and lagoons. It is located within a corresponding maze of peninsulas on the mainland on the northwest side of the Queen Charlotte Strait region.

Its main arm is 75 km (47 mi) in length from the mouth of the Seymour River to the mouth of its north arm, Belize Inlet, which is about 50 km (31 mi) in length and has its own side inlets, narrow waterways named Wentworth Sound and Alison Sound. In between Belize Inlet and Seymour Inlet is Nugent Sound, named for the first United States Consul in Victoria; Seymour Inlet itself is named for Frederick Seymour, Governor of the Crown Colony of British Columbia from 1864 to 1869.

Seymour Inlet has its own side-inlets, the largest being a south arm named Frederick Sound (also named for the governor), with a side-inlet of its own named Salmon Arm. Another is an unnamed inlet in the southwest corner, 12 km (7.5 mi) in length with its own side-inlets, including Nenahlmai Lagoon and Whelakis Lagoon. Seymour Inlet does not open directly onto the Queen Charlotte Strait but is accessed via Slingsby Channel and Schooner Channel, which are the passages on either side of Bramham Island.

At the entrance in Seymour Inlet, between Johnson Point and Hervell Point, are the Nakwakto Rapids, one of the fastest tidal rapid in the world.

== See also ==
- List of fjords in Canada
