= Belize Inlet =

Inlet on the coast of British Columbia, Canada

- Location in British Columbia
- Location: British Columbia, Canada
- Coordinates: 51°07′52″N 127°16′51″W
- Type: Fjord
- Ocean/sea sources: Pacific Ocean

Belize Inlet is an inlet on the Central Coast of British Columbia, Canada, located to the north of and adjoining Seymour Inlet.

== Definition ==
The division between Seymour Inlet & Belize Inlet is a line drawn from Johnson Point NE to an unnamed point at 51 06 51 - 127 30 00 (May 1961 letter from Hydrographic Service); the SW extremity is a line drawn W from Mignon Point

— November 1970 letter from Hydrographic Service.

== Name origin ==
Named in April 1865 by Captain Pender of the Beaver, in association with Seymour Inlet; Belize being the capital city of British Honduras, West Indies, of which British possession His Excellency Frederick Seymour was governor previous to his being appointed governor of British Columbia in 1864."
