= Wales Island (British Columbia) =

Island in British Columbia, Canada

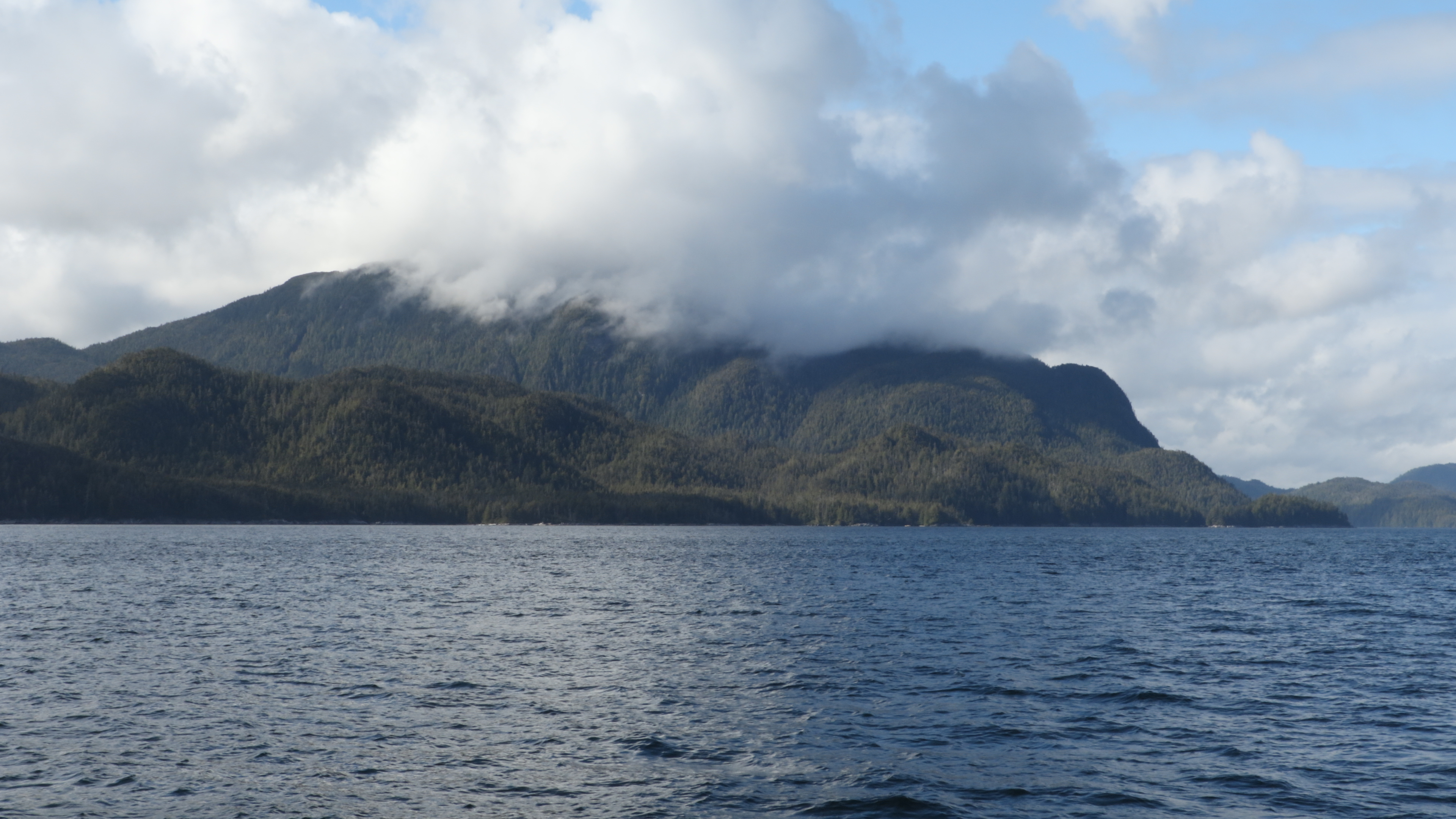
- Southeast Wales Island as seen from Portland Inlet
- Interactive map of Wales Island

Geography
- Location: Dixon Entrance
- Coordinates: 54°45′N 130°29′W
- Area: 35 sq mi (91 km^{2})
- Coastline: 33 mi (53 km)

Administration
- Canada
- Province: British Columbia
- Land District: Range 5 Coast Land District

Demographics
- Population: uninhabited (2006)

Wales Island is an island on the North Coast of British Columbia, Canada, situated east of the Dixon Entrance at the entrance to Portland Inlet.

35 square miles (91 km^{2}) in area, Wales Island is 30 miles (48 km) north of the port city of Prince Rupert, and 55 miles (89 km) south-east of Ketchikan, Alaska.

Wales Island is bounded on the north by the Pearse Canal and Wales Passage, and by Tongass Passage and Portland Inlet to the south. The international boundary between Alaska and British Columbia bisects Pearse Canal over a distance of 25 miles (40 km), such that the view from the north-west shore of Wales Island looks out over Alaska, specifically, Fillmore Island in the Misty Fjords National Monument. Within Canada, Pearse Island lies to the northeast.

== Features ==
=== Wales Harbour Conservancy ===
Created in 2008, and located on the west side of the north shore of Wales Island. The conservancy contains 666 ha (1,650 acres), while Wales Harbour provides a good anchorage.

=== Manzanita Cove Conservancy ===
Located on the east side of Wales Island at the mouth of Portland Canal. The conservancy contains 27 ha (67 acres) of upland and 35 ha (86 acres) of foreshore, and has historical significance, including remnants from late-19th-century boundary survey work.

=== Pearse Canal Island ===
Pearse Canal Island is located at the southern end of the Pearse Canal, at 54°47′00″N 130°36′00″W, and is the site of a flashing while light on an orange square skeleton tower, operated by the Canadian Hydrographic Service.

== Etymology ==
In August 1793, during his exploration of the west coast of North America in HMS Discovery, Captain George Vancouver named Wales Point, at the entrance to Portland Inlet, after William Wales, master of the Royal Mathematical School at Christ's Hospital, London. Both Wales and Vancouver had accompanied Captain James Cook on his second circumnavigation of the globe in HMS Resolution, 1772–75. At the time, George Vancouver was a young midshipman, and William Wales was the ship's astronomer. Vancouver later credited Wales with teaching him the necessary navigational skills which enabled his own explorations of the Pacific region in the early 1790s.

In 1871, an official at the British Hydrographic Office named Wales Island in association with the point of land named 78 years earlier by Captain Vancouver.

== History ==
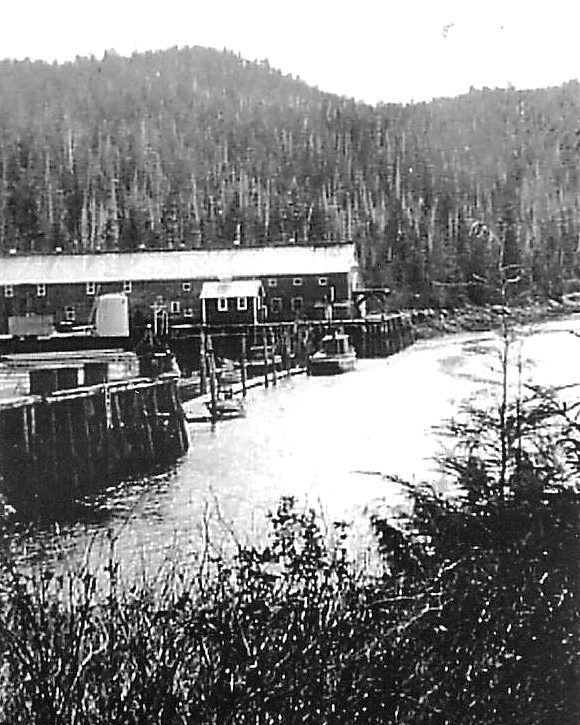
Wales Island Cannery, Pearse Canal, 1948

For an obscure island in a remote corner of the B.C. coast, Wales Island was to play a pivotal role in the often contentious Alaska Boundary Dispute between Canada and the United States. This dispute had its roots in the 1825 treaty signed by Russia and Great Britain, which attempted to define, in principle more than fact, the boundary that lay between Alaska and what was then the west coast of British North America. Included in the terms of this treaty was the stipulation that the southernmost boundary of Alaskan territory would advance northwards through Portland Canal to the 56th parallel north. This demarcation was claimed to have placed Wales Island firmly in Alaskan territory.

There the matter lay until Russia sold Alaska to the United States in 1867, and British Columbia became a province of Canada four years later, in 1871. Between this period and the final settlement of the boundary question in 1903, survey crews from both Canada and the United States actively explored, mapped and charted the high mountains, deep fjords, glaciers and bogland of this rugged terrain, often in collaboration. In 1896, the military intervened in the form of the United States Army Corps of Engineers, which constructed four stone houses in the Portland Canal area. This was done to strengthen America's claim to the Canal as the southernmost boundary of Alaska. One of these sturdy structures was built on the south shore of Wales Island, while another, on the border between Stewart, BC and Hyder, Alaska, can still be seen today.

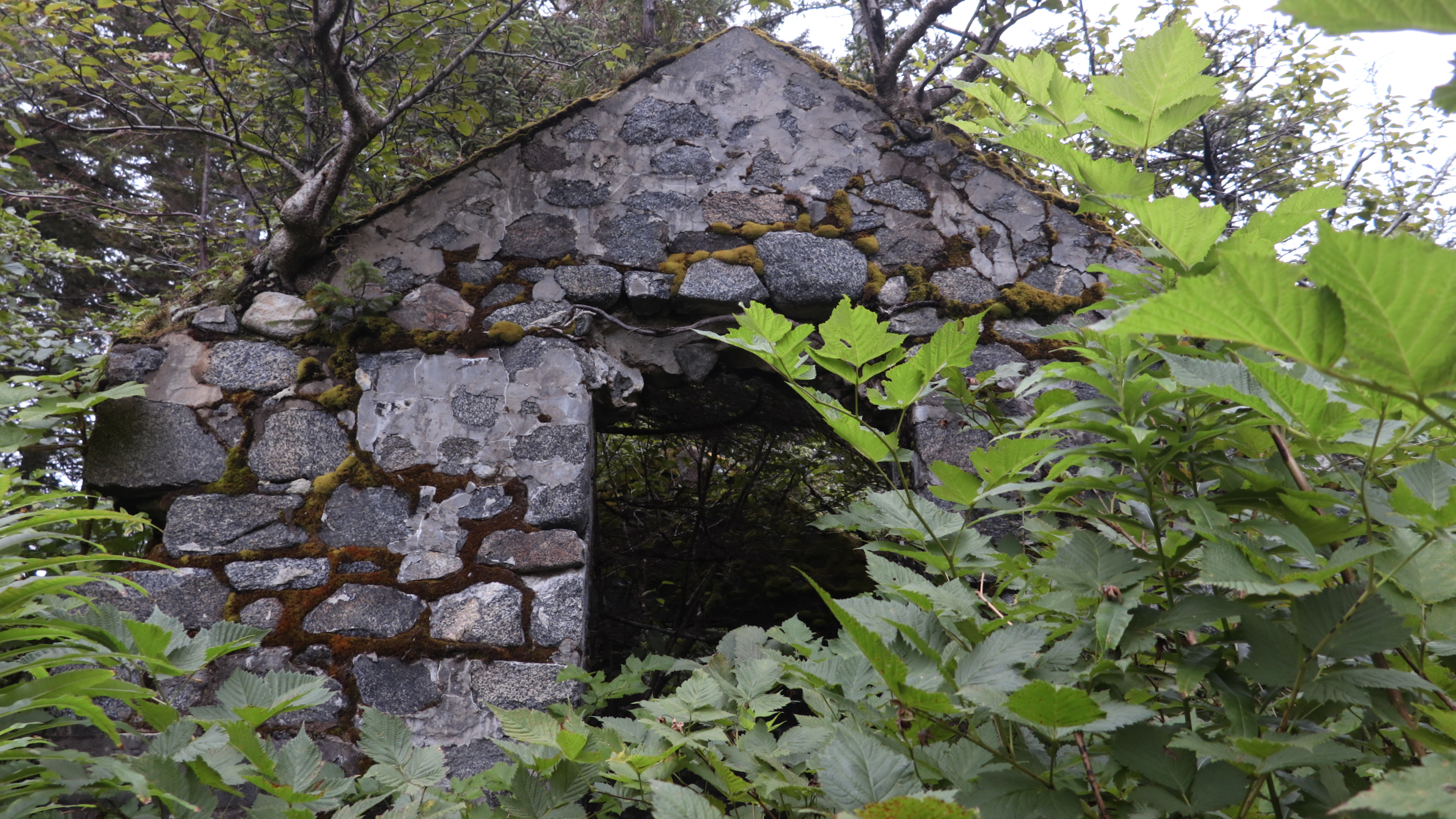
Stone ruins in Manzanita Cove, Wales Island, British Columbia

Two years later, the potential mineral wealth of the far north, as revealed by the Klondike Gold Rush of 1898, convinced both Canada and the United States that a new Alaska boundary treaty was urgently required. This renewed interest in the region led eventually to the signing of the Hay-Herbert Treaty in January, 1903. The terms of the treaty provided for a tribunal to settle the boundary question in precise geographical language. Thus, over the next several months, the Alaska Boundary Tribunal, with Canadian, American and British representatives, duly measured, mapped and deliberated, before delivering its award in October of that year.

Among the many consequences of this final demarcation of the boundaries of the Alaskan Panhandle was the result that Wales Island now belonged to British Columbia. In 1902, while Wales Island was still claimed to be in U.S. territory, a salmon cannery was built on the east shore of Pearse Canal, on the north-west side of the island. But as a result of the 1903 Tribunal Award, the American owners of the cannery forfeited possession of their facility, which by then had produced more than 3500 cases of canned salmon.

At the same time, Hidden Inlet Cannery, situated 14 miles (23 km) further north on the west shore of Pearse Canal, had suffered a reverse fate, and was now in Alaskan territory. In 1910, Merrill DesBrisay, the former Canadian owner of Hidden Inlet Cannery purchased Wales Island Cannery and rebuilt it. For the next 14 years, DesBrisay and Company operated the plant before selling to the Canadian Fishing Company in 1925. Wales Island Cannery had its peak production of 50,000 cases of salmon in the 1924 season. It produced its final pack of 26,000 cases in 1949, the last of eleven canneries to operate in the Nass River-Portland Canal area. For several years thereafter, the plant functioned as a summer gillnet station before being abandoned in the late 1950s. Today, a fly-in fishing lodge (Eagle Pointe) occupies the site of the former Wales Island Cannery.

Coda: In 1936, the U.S. Congress granted $100,000 to the former American owners of Wales Island Cannery, as compensation for the loss of their property 33 years earlier.

== Ecology ==
Wales Island lies on the northern edge of the Hecate Lowland Ecosection, a once heavily glaciated band of narrow lowland rain forest and coastal archipelago that stretches from Portland Inlet in the north to Queen Charlotte Strait in the south. Hecate Lowland terrain is generally rough and rocky, with wide areas of muskeg wetland and bog forest. Tree species include western red cedar, yellow cedar, mountain hemlock and fir. Salal, ferns, berry bush and western skunk cabbage are commonly found undergrowth. Lowland climate in the Wales Island region is dominated by frontal flows from Dixon Entrance, resulting in frequent wind storms and heavy rainfall.

Waterfowl are found in abundance throughout the protected inlets and estuaries that indent Wales Island's coastline of 33 miles (53 km). Species include murre, grebe, murrelet, gull, tern, loon, auklet, petrel and eagle. The island's topography affords a profusion of breeding and nesting habitat for a wide variety of seabirds, and is an integral component of the Pacific flyway.

== See also ==
- William Wales (astronomer)
- Hay-Herbert Treaty
- Pearse Island
