= Tongass =

Tongass may refer to:

- Fort Tongass
- Tongass Highway
- Tongass Island
- Tongass Narrows, a channel by Ketchikian, Alaska, which forms part of the Alaska Marine Highway
- Tongass National Forest
- Tongass Passage, a strait on the Canada-United States border
