= Tongass Passage =

- Tlingit: Séet Tlèin
- Location within Alaska
- Location: Alaska and British Columbia
- Coordinates: 54°44′39″N 130°38′10″W
- Type: Strait
- Basin countries: Canada and United States
- Islands: Pearse Island, Wales Island

Tongass Passage (Tlingit: Séet Tlèin) is a strait on the Canada–United States border between Alaska and British Columbia, located on the southwest side of Wales Island. Wales Island, and Pearse Island, to its northeast, were claimed by the United States prior to the settlement of the Alaska boundary dispute in 1903.

== History ==
Prior to that time, numerous American-owned canneries lined its shores. Canadian claims to the islands were affirmed in the Alaska Boundary Settlement of 1903, in which Tongass Passage, Pearse Canal and the Portland Canal were defined as comprising "Portland Channel", a term first used in the Anglo-Russian Treaty of 1825 as part of the marine boundary between Russian America and British claims in the region, but which remained undefined until the boundary settlement.

== See also ==
- Dixon Entrance
- Portland Inlet
- Fort Tongass
- Tongass Island
