= Seattle Sounders (disambiguation) =

Seattle Sounders FC is a Major League Soccer team.

Seattle Sounders may also refer to:

- Seattle Sounders (1974–1983), a defunct North American Soccer League team
- Seattle Sounders (1994–2008), a defunct USL First Division team

== See also ==
- Seattle Sounders Women, a Women's Premier Soccer League team currently known as Sound FC
- Seattle Sounders FC U-23, a USL League Two team currently known as Sound FC
- Seattle Sounders FC 2, a MLS Next PRO and former USL Championship team currently known as Tacoma Defiance
- Seattle Sounders FC Academy (2010–present), the U-18, U-16, and U-14 teams of Seattle Sounders FC
- Puget Sound
- Sounder (disambiguation)
- Seattle (disambiguation)
