= Pioneer Square totem pole =

Historic totem pole in Seattle, Washington, U.S.

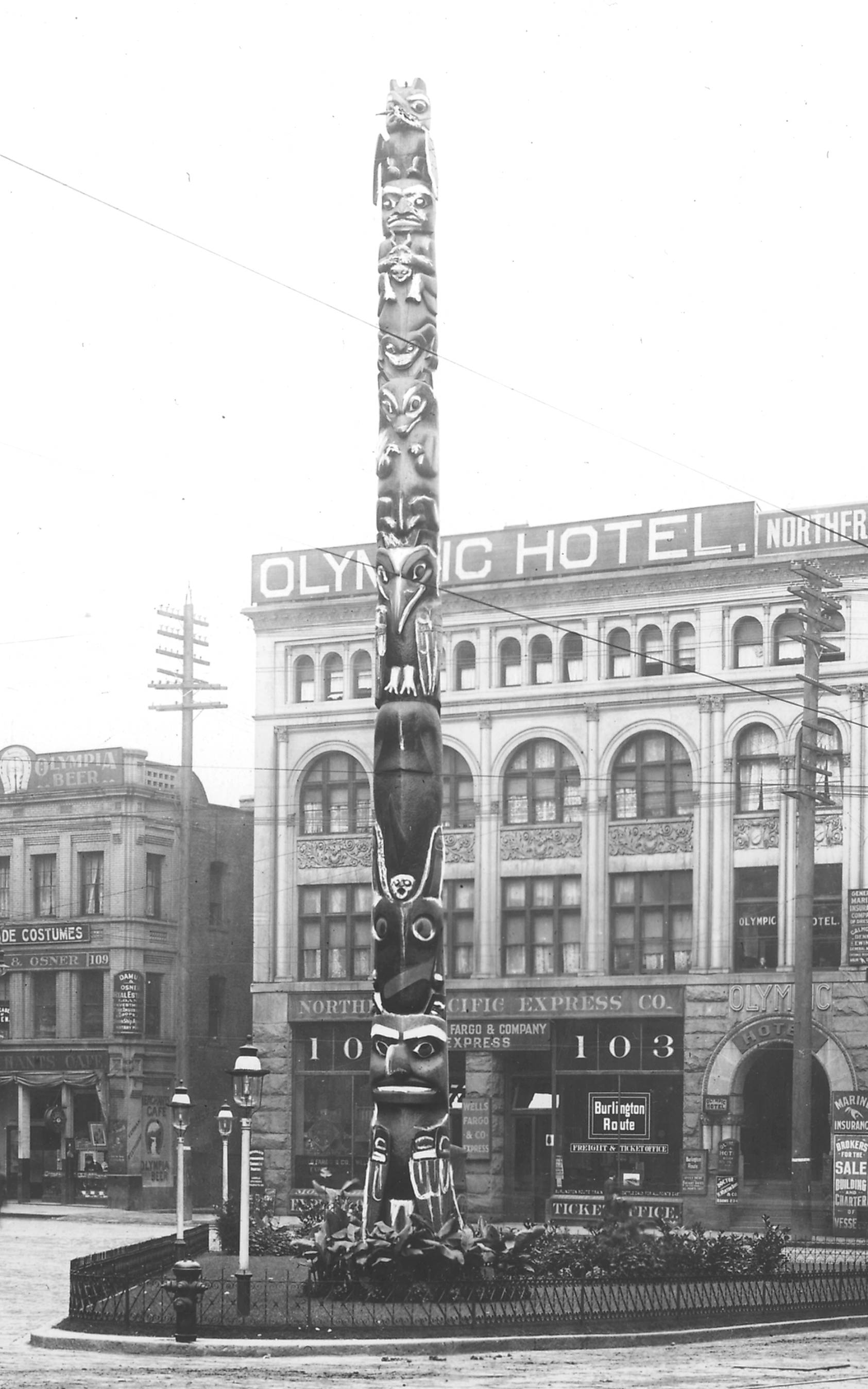
- The original totem pole, circa 1911
- Interactive map of Pioneer Square totem pole
- Location: Pioneer Square; Seattle, Washington, U.S.
- Type: Totem pole
- Material: Hemlock (original); Red cedar (replica)
- Width: 4.5 feet (1.4 m) (replica)
- Height: 49 feet 8 inches (15.14 m) (original); 50 feet (15 m) (replica)
- Completion date: c. 1790 (original); 1940 (replica)
- Pioneer Building, Pergola, and Totem Pole
- U.S. National Register of Historic Places
- U.S. National Historic Landmark
- U.S. Historic district – Contributing property
- Location within Downtown Seattle
- Coordinates: 47°36′7.5″N 122°20′2.6″W
- Part of: Pioneer Square–Skid Road District (ID70000086)
- NRHP reference No.: 77001340

Significant dates
- Added to NRHP: May 5, 1977
- Designated NHL: May 5, 1977
- Designated CP: June 22, 1970

The Pioneer Square totem pole, also referred to as the Seattle totem pole and historically as the Chief-of-All-Women pole, is a Tlingit totem pole located in Pioneer Square in downtown Seattle, Washington.

The original totem pole was carved in 1790 and raised in the Tlingit village on Tongass Island, Alaska to honor the Tlingit woman Chief-of-All-Women. The totem pole was later stolen by Seattle businessmen on an expedition to Alaska and subsequently gifted to the City of Seattle in 1899, where it was raised in Pioneer Square and became a source of civic pride. The totem pole was later damaged by arson and a replica was commissioned and installed in its place in 1940, which is now designated a National Historic Landmark.

== History ==
=== Tlingit origin ===
The totem pole was initially carved around the year 1790 and belonged to the Kinninook family, a Tlingit clan of the Raven moiety. It was carved to honor Chief-of-All-Women, a Tlingit woman who drowned in the Nass River while traveling to visit an ill sister. Her family hired a carver and gathered to tell him stories they wanted represented on her totem pole. When the totem pole was complete, they organized a potlatch and raised the totem pole in her honor in the Tlingit village on Tongass Island. It was one of the few totem poles dedicated to a woman.

=== Seattle Post-Intelligencer expedition ===
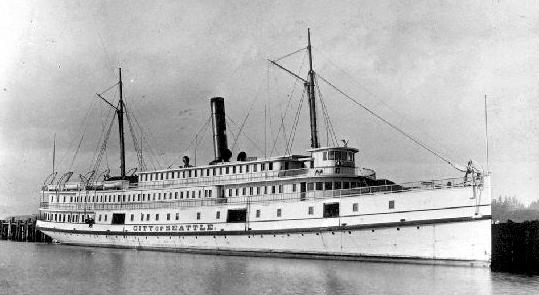
The steamship City of Seattle

In 1899, the Seattle Post-Intelligencer sponsored an expedition of "leading Seattle citizens" to the District of Alaska. The expedition was meant to be a "goodwill tour," with a mixture of business and pleasure, and the goal of investigating increased trade and investment in Alaska. However, even as the Klondike Gold Rush came to an end, civic leaders also wanted to solidify Seattle as the "Gateway to Alaska" and the Seattle Chamber of Commerce included a committee of prominent businessmen on the expedition.

On August 17, 1899, the expedition set sail on the steamship City of Seattle with a total of 165 men and women. The expedition included stops at Vancouver, Mary Island, New Metlakahtla, Ketckikan, Wrangell, Juneau, the Treadwell Mines, Skagway, Lake Bennett, Dyea, Pyramid Harbor, Glacier Bay, Muir Glacier, Killisnoo, Sitka and Victoria.

On the morning of August 28, 1899, the City of Seattle stopped at the Tlingit village at Fort Tongass when members of the Chamber of Commerce committee spotted multiple totem poles. The village appeared to be deserted and they decided to take a totem pole as a souvenir. Third mate R. D. McGillvery and other members of the expedition went ashore and McGillvery later described the events as:

The Indians were all away fishing, except for one who stayed in his house and looked scared to death. We picked out the best looking totem pole... I took a couple of sailors ashore and we chopped it down—just like you'd chop down a tree. It was too big to roll down the beach, so we sawed it in two.

During the process, McGillvery and the other sailors broke the beak on the bottom figure which was later incorrectly reconstructed. A carving of a seal, about 8 feet (2.4 m) in length, was also taken from the Tlingit village. After the totem pole was floated back to the ship, the Chamber of Commerce committee collectively paid McGillvery $2.50 for his labor. The expedition returned to Seattle on August 30, 1899, and the Chamber of Commerce committee subsequently presented the totem pole to the Seattle City Council as a gift to the city.

=== Installation in Pioneer Square and reception ===
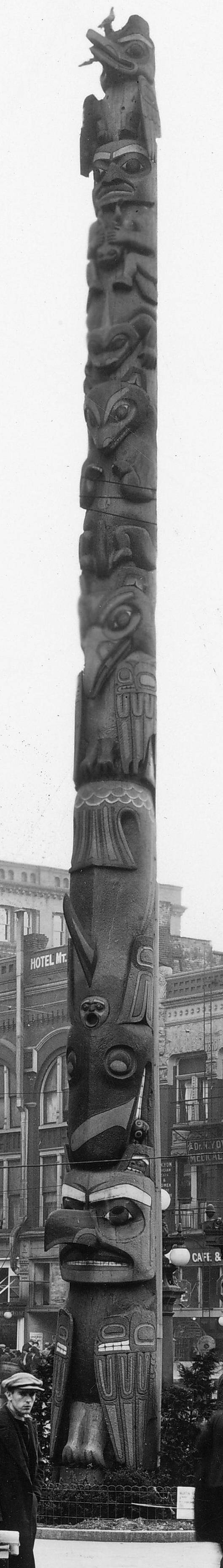
The original pole, c. 1924

The totem pole was repaired, repainted, and stored at the Denny Hotel in Denny Hill under watch of three members of the Chamber of Commerce committee. On October 18, 1899, the totem pole was unveiled in Pioneer Square in downtown Seattle. At the ceremony, city officials praised the Chamber of Commerce committee for their gift and assured the gathered crowd that no one had owned the totem pole and that the expedition saved it from its certain destruction. The Seattle Post-Intelligencer reported that it was "greeted by cheers of a multitude of people."

The Seattle Daily Times, however, reported a "wide divergence of opinion" on the totem pole. They published quotes from business owners in Pioneer Square, who described it as "a blot," "a disgrace," and "ridiculous," with one claiming that "it ought to be where it came from." Others were more receptive, stating that it was "just the thing for the gateway to Alaska" and describing it as a "handsome curio" and "unique and appropriate, but not pretty."

The Seattle Daily Times went even further by attacking its rival newspaper the Seattle Post-Intelligencer in a cartoon depicting the totem pole with a sign on it stating "Read the P.I. — Circulates some of THE LARGEST in the state — Robbing Indian Graves a specialty." Below the cartoon it described the totem pole as "disgracing Pioneer Square."

=== Tlingit response and legal action ===
The Tlingit, with the exception of the elderly and small children, had simply been away for the fishing and cannery season when the City of Seattle arrived at Fort Tongass and they were shocked to discover the totem pole gone when they returned. The Kinninook family and Tlingit witnesses of the theft contacted the governor of the District of Alaska John Green Brady and demanded legal action.

On November 9, 1899, William E. Kinninook filed a claim for damages with the Seattle City Comptroller against the City of Seattle in the sum of $10,000 for accepting the property of a theft. On November 22, 1899 it was reported that the Seattle City Council declined to consider the claim further as the Comptroller stated that members of the expedition who stole the totem pole "repudiated any responsibility".

While the claim for damages in Seattle was dismissed, legal proceedings continued in Alaska where both the captain and purser of the City of Seattle steamship were subpoenaed to appear in front of a Federal grand jury in Juneau to discuss their roles in the incident. The City of Seattle was also detained in the Juneau port during the investigation. After a day and a half, no indictments were filed and the officers and steamship were released.

On November 24, 1899, Salmon Chishiahud, who claimed to own the totem pole, brought a suit against E. B. Piper of the Seattle Post-Intelligencer and other members of the expedition to recover $20,000 in damages.

As the Seattle Daily Times continued to report on all the totem pole developments, the Seattle Post-Intelligencer continued to defend the "Business Men's Alaska excursion" and made the claim that "totempolitis, a new and fearful diseases, continues to rage with much virulence in the office of our amiable neighbor, The Times."

On December 6, 1899, the Seattle Post-Intelligencer, in a deal negotiated by the Seattle attorney E. F. Blaine, agreed to pay $500 each to four Native Americans who claimed to be its owner. This occurred after the news that the Federal grand jury in Juneau had dispatched a U.S. marshal with indictments against members of the Seattle Post-Intelligencer expedition and they allegedly hurried to come to a settlement. A member of the expedition was quoted as saying "Yes, we paid $2000. We were so frightened we would have paid any amount."

On December 8, 1899, the steamer Cottage City arrived in Seattle with indictments against eight members of the Chamber of Commerce committee for theft of government property. (Note: The Tlingit village was located at Fort Tongass, a United States Army base) They included: Edgar B. Piper, the editor of the Seattle Post-Intelligencer; Thomas Prosch, secretary of the Chamber of Commerce; E. F. Blaine, the attorney who negotiated the $2000 settlement; Hon. William H. Thompson, attorney; Rev. J. P. D. Llywd, rector at St. Mark's Church; and N. H. Latimer, the manager of the Dexter Horton Bank.

William H. Thompson defended the indicted men and said:

The village has long since been deserted ... Here the totem will voice the natives' deeds with surer speech than if lying prone on moss and fern on the shore of Tongass Island.

The suit was dismissed in the U.S. District Court in Alaska in June 1900. This occurred after the newly-appointed District Judge Melville C. Brown stopped in Seattle on the way to his Alaska posting and was entertained at the private Rainier Club. In dismissing the suit, the District Attorney Fredericks stated that "an investigation of the case leads me to believe that the defendants, although guilty of vandalism, did not intend to commit a crime." Another settlement of $500 was announced, which included $300 for the totem pole and $200 to erect a marble monument to replace it. The Seattle Post-Intelligencer paid the settlement on the defendants' behalf.

=== Source of civic pride ===
In the following years, the totem pole became a source of civic pride for Seattle and was featured on post cards and brochures. In 1909, Seattle hosted the Alaska–Yukon–Pacific Exposition, which in part celebrated the transformation of Seattle from a small town to a booming city, and the totem pole was featured on the official brochure. The totem pole had lost all association with the Tlingit owners and a 1910 article described it as the "totem pole that made Seattle famous."

In March 1923, the totem pole was moved 25 feet (7.6 m) south to make room for a new sidewalk in Pioneer Place and the widening of First Avenue. In 1958, Seattle's professional ice hockey team was renamed the Seattle Totems.

=== Destruction and commission of replica ===
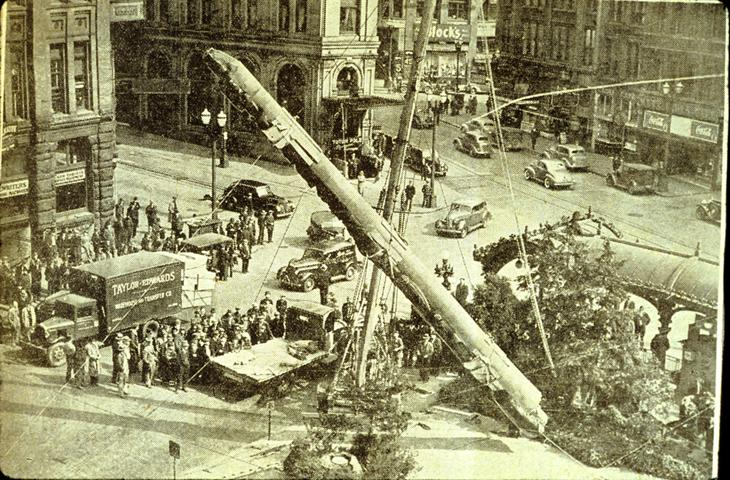
Raising the replica in Pioneer Square, 1940

In October 1938, the totem pole was damaged by an arsonist. On April 12, 1939 the totem pole was taken down, nearly 40 years after it was erected, to determine if it could be repaired. After the inspection, it was found to be too damaged by the fire and dry rot for repair and the Seattle City Council and Park Board sought to have a replica commissioned. The United States Forest Service was directing a totem pole restoration project in southeastern Alaska and offered to employ Civilian Conservation Corps Tlingit carvers to craft a replica.

The damaged totem pole was shipped to Saxman, Alaska, where Tlingit carver Charles Brown directed a team of carvers which included members of the Kinninook family. The replica was completed after three months of work, and because the red cedar used to carve the totem pole had come from Forest Service land and the carvers were paid by the government, a special act of Congress was passed to allow transfer of ownership of the totem pole from the Forest Service to the City of Seattle. The completed replica was dedicated with tribal blessings and shipped to Seattle in April 1940 and then raised in Pioneer Square in a ceremony on July 24, 1940.

In 1972, Tsimshian carver John C. Hudson, Jr. restored and repainted the totem pole. In 1977, the totem pole—along with the Pioneer Building and pergola in Pioneer Square—was designated a National Historic Landmark.

=== Modern-day controversy ===
The Coast Salish, who are native to Seattle and the Pacific Northwest Coast, did not traditionally carve totem poles and the Pioneer Square totem pole was the first totem pole in Seattle. However, totem poles have since become a symbol of Seattle. When Seattle's professional ice hockey team was renamed the Seattle Totems, the head of the team's new ownership group stated that they "wanted a label which would better connote the Puget Sound area."

Totem poles are also used in tourism campaigns and prominently featured in Victor Steinbrueck Park adjacent to Pike Place Market, while native Salish art has not been featured as prominently. Seattle City Councilmember Debora Juarez, a member of the Blackfeet Nation, called for a review of all the totem poles in the city for cultural sensitivity, which was granted by the city council in November 2018.

The review led to a list of Native or Native-inspired artwork on city-owned land, however, no analysis has been conducted on what was created by non-Native artists and what was created by Coast Salish artists. The renovation of Victor Steinbrueck Park renewed the controversy as it was reported in July 2022 that the totem poles there were designed and carved by a non-Native artist. As of 2023, the Pioneer Square totem pole and those in Victor Steinbrueck Park continue to stand.

== Appearance and meaning ==
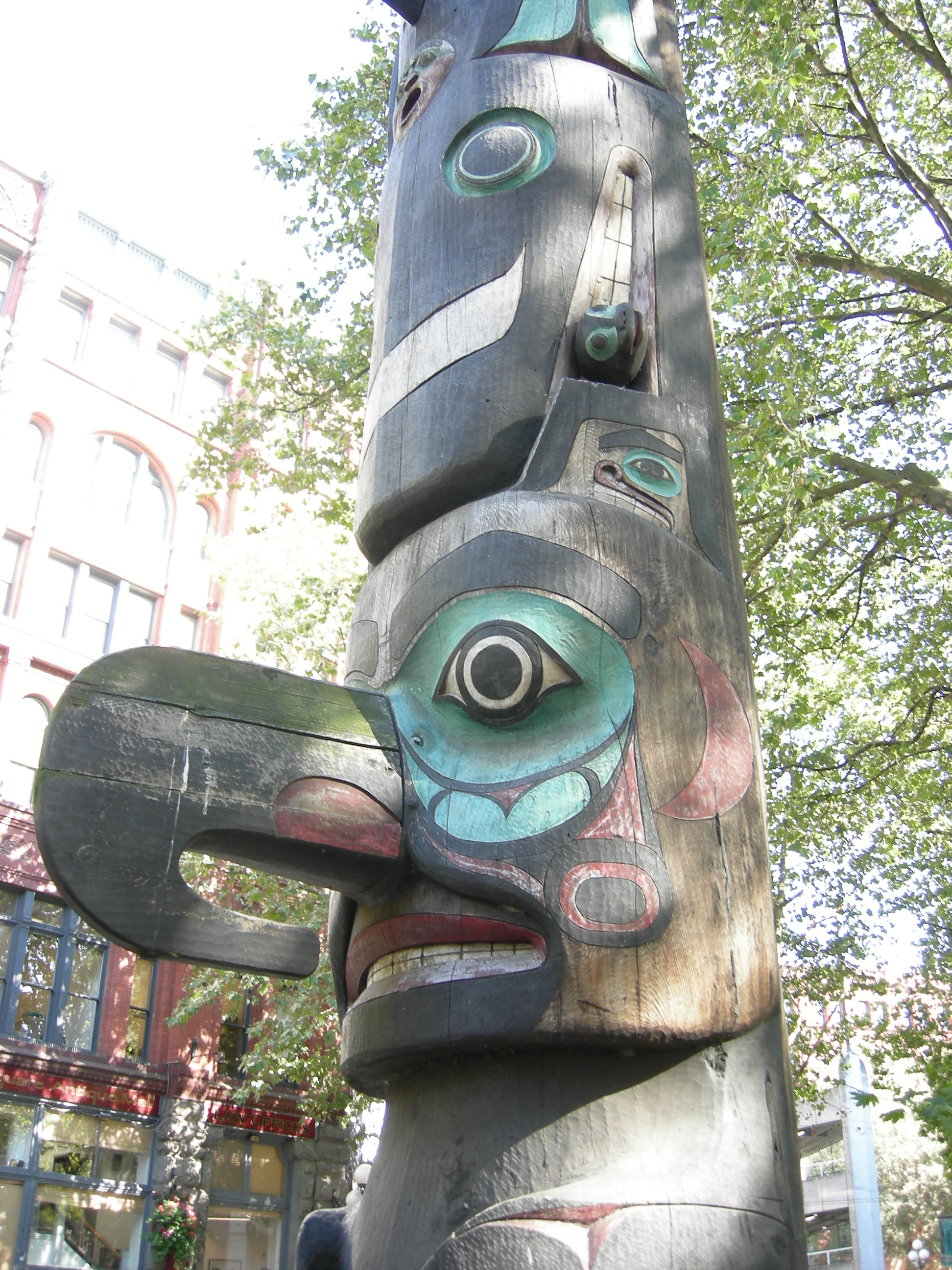
The replica's base, 2007

The original Chief-of-All-Women pole was 49 feet 8 inches (15.14 m) tall and was carved from hemlock, while the replica stands 50 feet (15 m) tall and was carved from a 70-foot (21 m) red cedar from Kina Cove near Kasaan, Alaska.

The original totem pole had been repainted with successive coats of non-Tlingit colors in an attempt to preserve the pole. The replica, however, used the native Tlingit colors of black, red and blue-green.

Totem poles are read from top to bottom, with the topmost figure identifying the owner. On the Pioneer Square totem pole that is Raven, which in Tlingit mythology "did everything, knew everything, and seemed to be everywhere at once." The other figures, in descending order on the totem pole, are: a woman holding her frog child, the woman's frog husband, Mink, Raven and Whale with a seal in his mouth. At the bottom of the totem pole is Raven-at-the-Head-of-Nass, who is also called Grandfather of Raven.

Three legends told by Chief-of-All-Women's lineage are represented on the totem pole. The first legend is Raven Steals the Sun, Stars and Moon, which involves Raven, who holds the crescent moon in his beak, and Grandfather of Raven. In this legend, Raven, who had made all living creatures, lived in darkness because he had not yet made the sun. One day, he learned that there was a chief who possessed the sun, the moon, and the stars in a box. Raven turned himself into a needle and fell into the chief's daughter's drinking cup, who drank the needle and gave birth to a son, who was Raven. The chief (Grandfather of Raven) loved his grandson (Raven) and gave him whatever he asked for, including the moon and stars, which Raven scattered across the sky. Grandfather of Raven then gave Raven the box containing the sun, which Raven took and flew up through the smoke hole with. He then opened the box and let sunlight into the world, which frightened and subsequently spread his people to every corner of the world.

The second legend concerns the woman holding her frog child and the woman's frog husband. In it, a young woman makes a derogatory remark about frogs which a frog hears before turning himself into a man. The woman then married him and was happy until she learned that they lived under a lake and her husband and his relatives and her own children were all frogs. She sent her children to her father's home, who sent the frogs away, but he eventually became suspicious and discovered his daughter living in the lake with the frogs. He drained the lake, killing his daughter's frog husband, but rescuing his daughter and grandchildren. She did not live long afterwards though and her frog children eventually turned into humans and never returned to the lake.

The final legend involves Raven and Mink, who are swallowed by a whale along with firewood and stones they bring to build a fire in his stomach. When the whale swallows fish, Raven and Mink cook them over the fire. However, the whale does not swallow enough fish and they begin to cut slices of fat from the whale's stomach. Eventually, they grow tired of their journey and cut out the whale's heart and kill him. The whale washes ashore and Raven sings until people come and cut open the whale to free Raven and Mink. Raven emerges sleek and glossy, while Mink emerges a dirty brown color from drying himself in rotten wood. Raven consumes all the meat and oil of the whale himself before setting off on further adventures.
