= Pearse Canal =

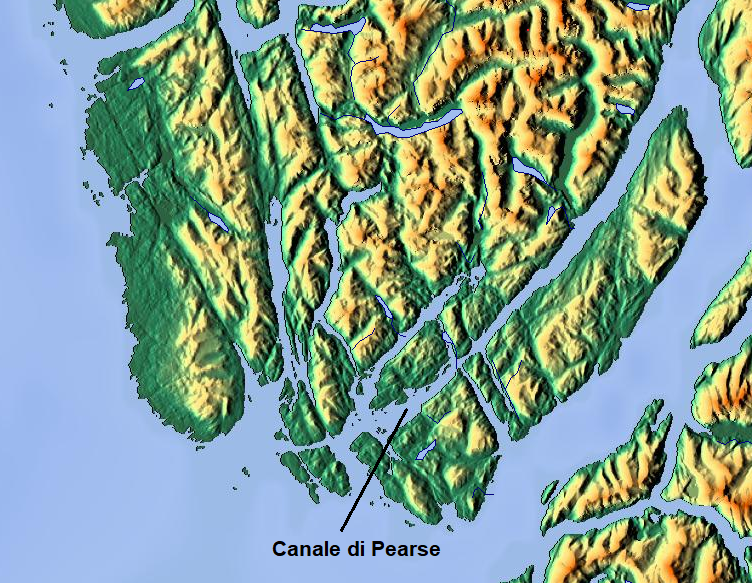
- Map of Pearse Canal

- Location in British Columbia
- Location: Alaska and British Columbia
- Coordinates: 54°53′54″N 130°23′33″W
- Type: Channel or Strait
- Ocean/sea sources: Pacific Ocean
- Basin countries: Canada and United States

Pearse Canal is a channel or strait forming part of the Canada–United States border at the southern end of the Alaska Panhandle and adjacent to the mouth of Portland Inlet. It is on the northwest side of Wales and Pearse Islands, which are in British Columbia, Canada, and forms part of the southwestern edge of Misty Fiords National Monument in Alaska, United States. The southwest entrance to the strait is between Phipp Point and Maie Point, both in Alaska.

== Name origin ==
The strait was named by Captain Daniel Pender in 1868 as part of surveying of the coast, in association with Pearse Island.

== International boundary ==
Pearse Canal was established as part of the Canada-United States border as part of the outcome of the Alaska boundary dispute with the Hay-Herbert Treaty, otherwise known as the Alaska Boundary Settlement, of January 24, 1903. US claims had included Wales and Pearse Island. Under the terms of the treaty, Pearse Canal along with Tongass Passage (due west of Canada's Wales Island) and the Portland Canal is defined as "Portland Channel", a term which was established as defining the boundary by the Anglo-Russian Treaty of 1825 but which remained undefined and not on maps until this time. Disputes over the meaning of the term were pivotal to the eventual settlement of the boundary in this region. A varying interpretation maintained the meaning was Clarence Strait, while the original US interpretation interpreted it as south of Wales Island.
