= Fillmore Island =

Southeast Alaskan island

Coordinates: 54°49′40″N 130°33′34″W

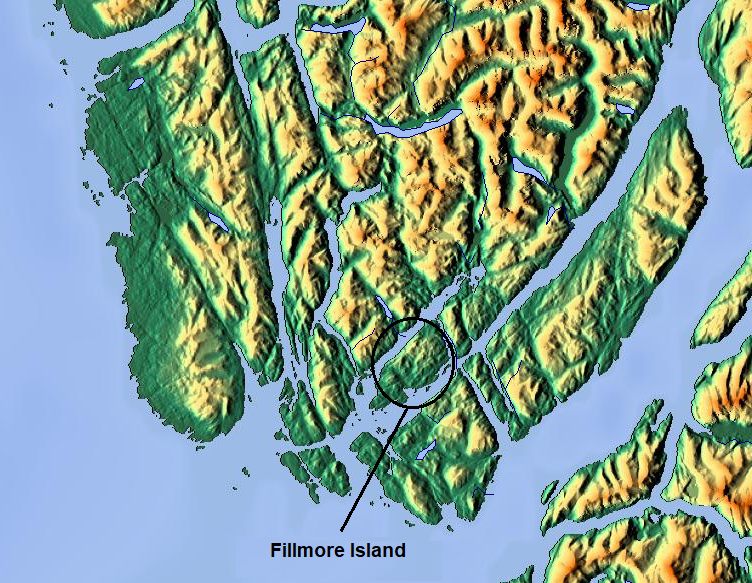

Fillmore Island is an island in Southeast Alaska, United States. The island lies between Fillmore Inlet and Pearse Canal. The island was charted by George Vancouver in 1793, who sailed around it and proved its insular nature. It was named in 1885 by the United States Coast and Geodetic Survey after Ensign John Hudson Fillmore, USN.
