= Pioneer Square pergola =

Historic pergola in Seattle, Washington

- Pioneer Building, Pergola, and Totem Pole
- U.S. National Register of Historic Places
- U.S. National Historic Landmark
- U.S. Historic district – Contributing property
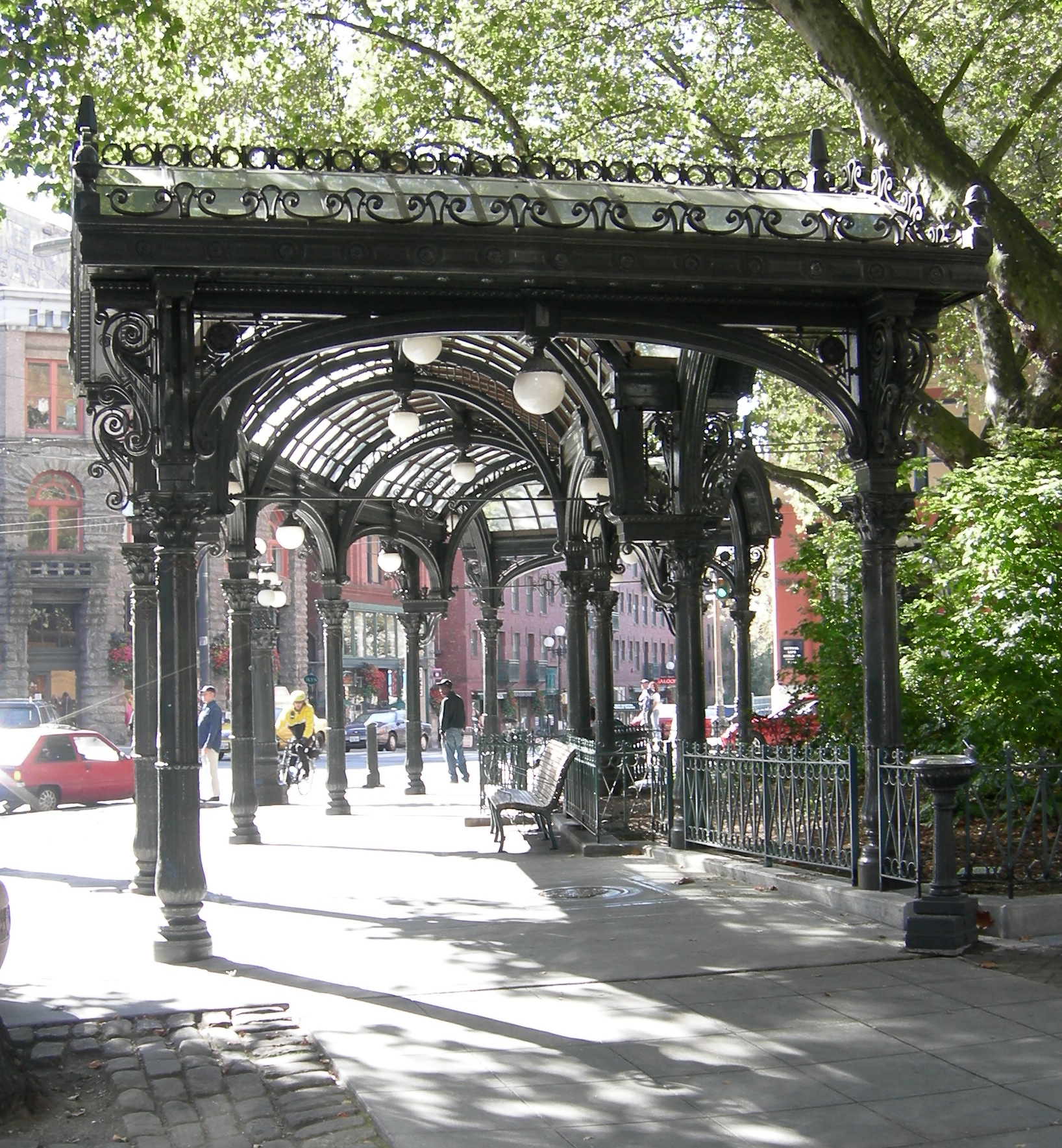
- Looking west at the pergola, 2007

- Location within Downtown Seattle
- Location: 1st Avenue and Yesler Way; Seattle, Washington, U.S.
- Coordinates: 47°36′06.7″N 122°20′02.1″W
- Built: 1909
- Architect: Julian F. Everett
- Restored: 1972, 2001
- Part of: Pioneer Square–Skid Road District (ID70000086)
- NRHP reference No.: 77001340

Significant dates
- Added to NRHP: May 5, 1977
- Designated NHL: May 5, 1977
- Designated CP: June 22, 1970

The Pioneer Square Pergola is a cast iron and glass pergola in Pioneer Square, a park in Downtown Seattle, Washington, United States. It was built in 1909 to shelter passengers waiting for cable cars on the James Street and Yesler Way lines. The pergola is located at the intersection of 1st Avenue and Yesler Way, and was designated a National Historic Landmark in 1977 alongside the adjacent Pioneer Building and totem pole.

The structure originally included an underground public bathroom that was closed after the end of cable car service in the 1940s. After decades of deterioration, the pergola was restored by the city government in 1972 with an extensive renovation and dedicated as part of Pioneer Square plaza. It was rebuilt entirely in 2001 after the pergola was destroyed by a semi-truck collision, costing $3.4 million. The rebuilt pergola has since been reinforced and protected against future collisions, but has suffered damage in other incidents.

== Description and history ==
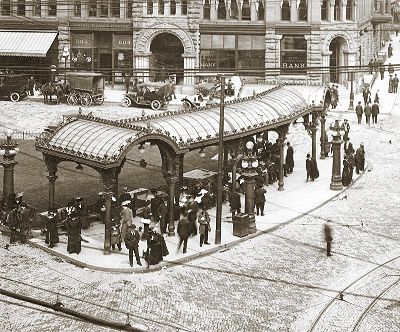
Overhead view of the pergola, 1914

The Victorian-style, triangular structure was designed by Julian F. Everett, a local architect, and originally functioned as a comfort station. It measures 60 feet (18 m) long and 16 feet (4.9 m) high, supported by a series of iron columns. It featured ornate iron decorations, a glass roof, and an underground public bathroom that opened on September 23, 1909, at a cost of $24,000. The bathroom, one of the first underground facilities of its kind for Seattle, featured terrazzo floors, brass and nickel fixtures, and white Alaskan marble stalls. It had sixteen stalls for men and nine for women, and was described as the best and most lavish public restroom west of the Mississippi. Its inclusion was controversial at the time, having been deemed an unsightly addition to the park by The Seattle Times and community groups. As cable car service was cancelled and the area declined, the pergola deteriorated and was stripped for materials by the late 1940s. The bathroom itself was closed in 1948 in lieu of renovations.

=== 1972 restoration ===
The pergola was restored in 1972 with a $100,000 donation from James E. Casey, who founded the United Parcel Service in Pioneer Square. Using the original blueprints to recreate the ornamental roof and light fixtures, restoration work began in July 1972 and was finished in February 1973 ahead of the formal dedication of the expanded Pioneer Square parkspace. The pergola's underground bathroom was left untouched by the renovation and was unsuccessfully proposed as an addition to the Seattle Underground Tour in the late 1990s. A similar pergola at Occidental Park was built in the 1970s and removed in 2006.

The renovated pergola suffered accelerated deterioration that forced it to be closed and repaired in 1992 at a cost of $100,000, as bolts used during the restoration had rusted.

=== 2001 destruction and 2002 rebuild ===
It was accidentally destroyed on January 15, 2001, in a collision with a commercial semi-truck that clipped the structure while making a 90-degree turn. Owing to its status as a city landmark, the city government pledged to rebuild the pergola or build a new structure if restoration proved infeasible. The trucking company claimed full responsibility and funded $1 million towards the cost of rebuilding the pergola through its insurer.

Working with project architect Ron Wright & Associates, Seidelhuber Iron and Bronze Works rebuilt the pergola based on repaired sections rather than the original documents, at a cost of $3.4 million. While the project was originally planned to be finished in time for Christmas, the repair work required more time and was made more complicated by the February 2001 earthquake, which caused the roof of the underground restroom to sink by 5.5 inches (14 cm). The Seidelhuber foundry's owners financed the project's performance bond on their own, requiring them to sell their home and wedding rings. Installation of the restored pergola elements began in June 2002, using only one percent of new material for the exterior furnishings. The new pergola was fitted with a steel skeleton to prevent a future collapse; the twelve Corinthian columns and sixteen arches were rebuilt using iron from the original structure.

The pergola was reopened on August 17, 2002, costing a total of $3.9 million.

=== 2000s to present ===
Due to repeated vehicle strikes, the city government installed structural poles and bollards to protect the pergola. The bollards stopped two semi-trucks in 2008 and 2012 and prevented further damage to the structure. It was struck twice in 2013 by a semi-truck and a hit-and-run driver who damaged the iron fencing around the structure. Seattle Seahawks fans celebrating the team's Super Bowl XLVIII victory in February 2014 climbed atop the pergola and broke twenty of the glass roof panes; Seahawks fans and private businesses later raised $25,000 through crowdfunding for repairs to the structure. In response, a temporary fence was installed around the pergola ahead of the team's appearance at the following Super Bowl in 2015.

== See also ==
- National Register of Historic Places listings in Seattle
