= Fillmore Inlet =

Coordinates: 54°51′28″N 130°33′14″W

Fillmore Inlet is an inlet in Southeast Alaska, U.S.A. The inlet separates Fillmore Island from the mainland. It was first charted in 1793 by George Vancouver.
