= John R. Toole =

American politician (1849–1916)

John Ryan Toole (July 3, 1849 – March 4, 1916) was an industrialist and legislator in Montana. He served in the Montana State Legislature in 1890.

== Biography ==
Toole was born in Aroostook County, Maine, on July 3, 1849, (Note: Toole's gravestone has 1850 as his birth year, but contemporary obituaries and biographies state that he was born in 1849, and the 1850 census shows him to already be one year old in August, 1850.) and moved to Madison, Wisconsin, with his parents in 1855. He began working in the mining industry in Utah in 1873. Five years later, in 1878, he took his mining career to Idaho where he met his wife, Anna Hardenbrook. They had six children: Honora, Thula, Allan, Howard, Brice, and John R. Jr.

The family moved to Anaconda, Montana, in 1884. While living in Anaconda, Toole worked for Marcus Daly's smelter and became known as Daly's right-hand man. Toole was elected to the territorial legislature in 1886 and reelected in 1888. He was nominated to the state legislature in 1889 and was part of the Montana Constitutional Convention. In 1900, the Toole family relocated to Missoula, Montana, where Toole became president of the Big Blackfoot Milling Company. Toole died on March 4, 1916, in California and was buried in Missoula Cemetery.

== Family ==

Toole married Anna Hardenbrook on November 2, 1882. Their first child Honora was born in 1883. She eventually married John R. Clifton. The couple's second daughter Thula was born in 1885 and married George Weisel. Their first son Allan was born in 1887, followed by Howard born in 1890. Howard would eventually marry Marjorie Ross. The third son Brice was born in 1893, followed by John R. Jr.

Today, Missoula has a street named Toole Avenue as well as a John H. Toole Park. John Howard Toole, for whom the Park is named was the grandson of John R. Toole, first son of Howard Toole and Marjorie Ross. John H. was a decorated World War II veteran who became a successful businessman and eventually served as Mayor of Missoula. He died in 1991.

== Big Blackfoot Milling Company ==
The Anaconda Mining Company, which was owned by copper-king Marcus Daly, began expanding and established a milling company in Missoula. The purpose of the company was to harvest timber to run Anaconda's smelter. John R. Toole became president of the company shortly after he moved to Missoula. The mill was known by various other names over the years, including Hammond-Bonner Lumber Mill, the Anaconda Mill and the Western Lumber Mill. By 1900, the Big Blackfoot Milling Company had depleted much of its timber supply and started cutting further up the Blackfoot. Most of the logs were floated down the river to Bonner.

== Toole house ==

The neoclassical Toole home in Missoula, located on Gerald Avenue, was designed in 1902 by architect J.F. Everett. Everett followed the style of the popular World's Columbian Exposition in Chicago. Twelve-foot ceilings, pocket doors and oak columns are just a few of the features in the house. It also has seven fireplaces and, according to Toole, "There was not a more attractive fireside in Montana." A Palladian window and fan lights line the main entry. Anna Hardenbrook Toole sold the house in 1931 to Kappa Kappa Gamma, giving a home to the first sorority in Missoula. Two of Toole's daughters, as well as granddaughters, great-granddaughters and a daughter-in-law, have been members of Kappa Kappa Gamma and called the house their home during their college years. Three additions have been made to the house, but it still retains its original symmetry and classical ornamentation. In 1983, the house was placed on the National Register of Historic Places.
