= Portland Canal =

Fjord on the Canada–United States border

- French: Canal Portland
- Kʼalii Xkʼalaan (Nisga'a)
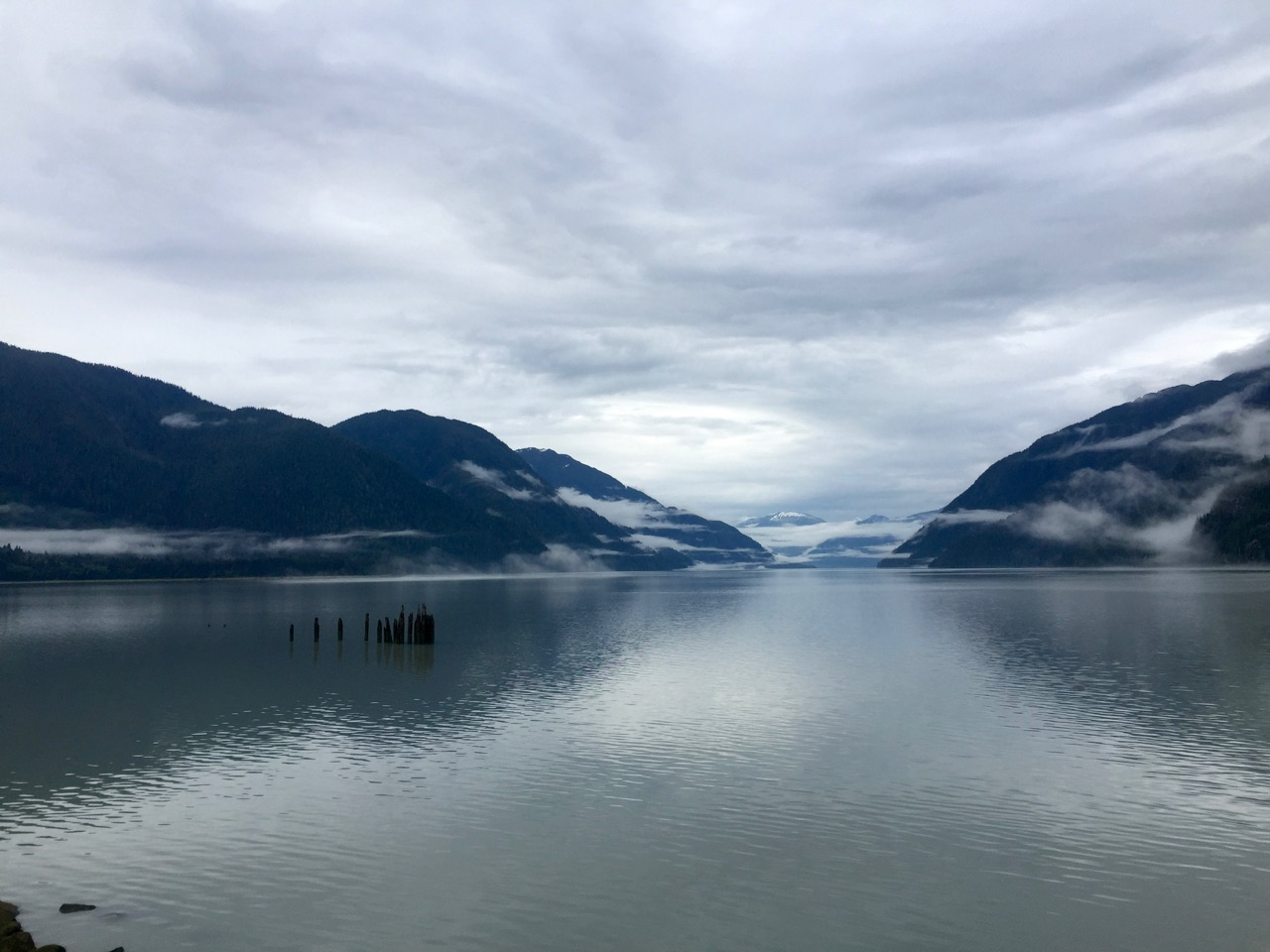
- Portland Canal from Hyder, Alaska

- Location within British Columbia
- Interactive map of Portland Canal
- Location: Alaska and British Columbia
- Coordinates: 55°27′00″N 130°02′00″W
- Type: Fjord
- Part of: Portland Inlet
- Basin countries: Canada and United States

Portland Canal is an arm of Portland Inlet, one of the principal inlets of the British Columbia Coast. It is approximately 114 km (71 mi) long. The Portland Canal forms part of the border between southeastern Alaska and British Columbia. The name of the entire inlet in the Nisga'a language is Kʼalii Xkʼalaan, with xkʼalaan meaning "at the back of (someplace)". The upper end of the inlet was home to the Tsetsaut (Jitsʼaawit in Nisgaʼa), who after being decimated by war and disease were taken under the protection of the Laxsgiik (Eagle) chief of the Nisgaʼa, who holds the inlet's title in native law.

Despite its naming as a canal, the inlet is a fjord, a completely natural and not man-made geographic feature, and extends 114.6 km (71.2 mi) northward from the Portland Inlet at Pearse Island, British Columbia, to Stewart, British Columbia, and Hyder, Alaska. Observatory Inlet joins the Portland Canal at Ramsden Point, where both merge with Portland Inlet. Pearse Canal joins Portland Canal at the north end of Pearse Island.

Portland Canal was given its name by George Vancouver in 1793, in honour of William Cavendish-Bentinck, 3rd Duke of Portland. The use of the word canal to name inlets on the British Columbia Coast and the Alaska Panhandle is a legacy of the Spanish exploration of the area in the 18th century. For example, Haro Strait between Victoria and the San Juan Islands was originally Canal de Haro. The English cognate to the Spanish canal is "channel", which is found throughout the coast, cf. Dean Channel. George Vancouver used both terms in his naming of inlets, Hood Canal for example.

The placement of the international boundary in the Portland Canal was a major issue during the negotiations over the Alaska boundary dispute, which heated up as a result of the Klondike Gold Rush and ended by arbitration in 1903. Together with Pearse Canal and Tongass Passage, the Portland Canal is defined by the Alaska Boundary Settlement (the Hay-Herbert Treaty) as part of Portland Channel (Canal), a term used as forming the marine boundary in the Anglo-Russian Treaty of 1825 but which was undefined at the time.

== See also ==
- Granduc Mine
