= Julian F. Everett =

American architect (1869–1955)

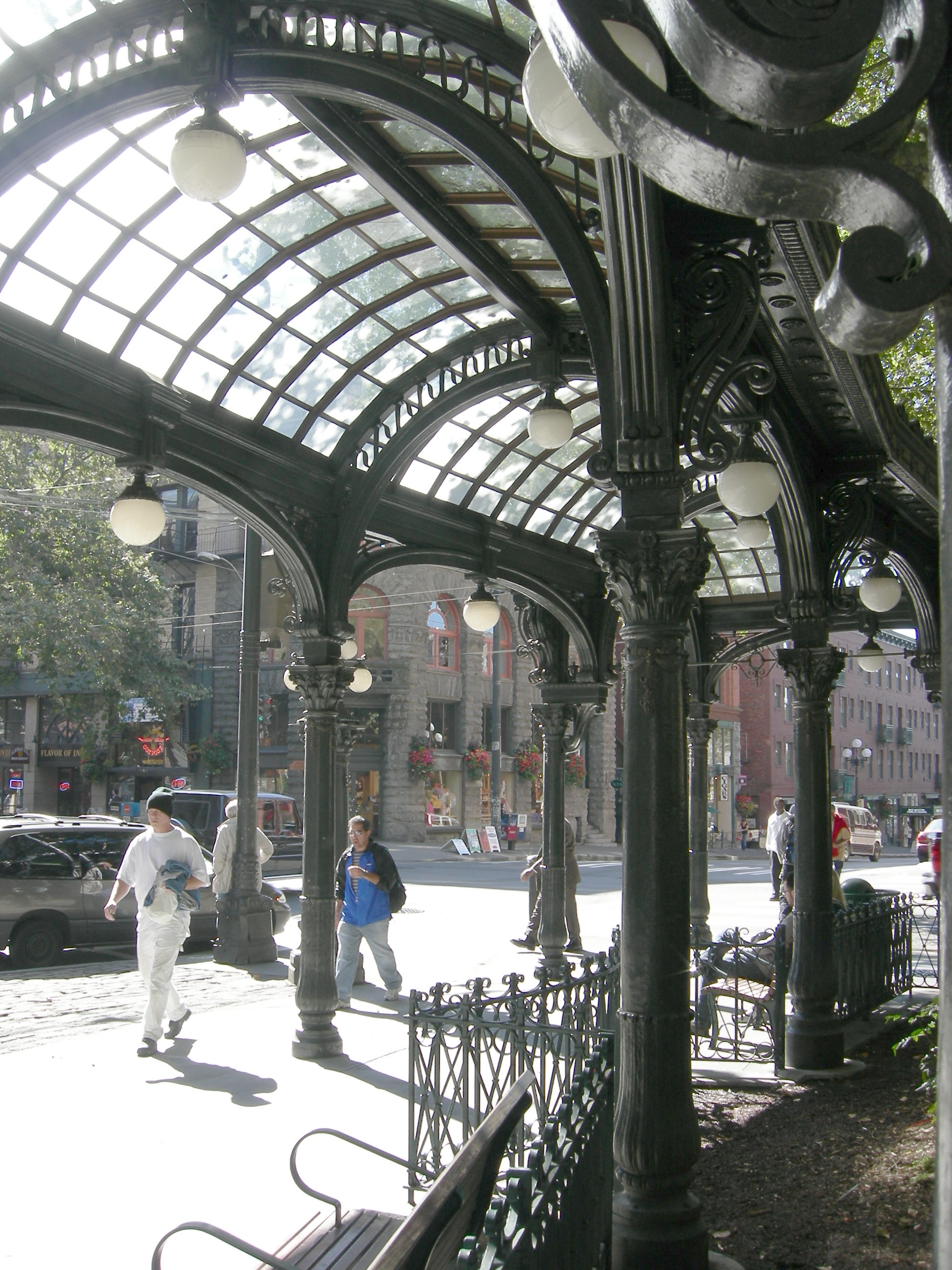
Pioneer Square pergola in Seattle's Pioneer Square

Julian Franklin Everett (October 5, 1869 – January 13, 1955) was an American architect known for the buildings he designed in Seattle, Washington. His work includes a synagogue for the Temple de Hirsch congregation (1908) and the Pioneer Square Comfort Station and Pergola in Seattle (1909), now a historic landmark. Some of his works, including the temple and a building for Pathé Exchange, were later demolished, while others are listed on the National Register of Historic Places (NRHP).

== Early life and career ==
Everett was born on October 5, 1869 in Leeds, Wisconsin. He studied at the University of Wisconsin, the Massachusetts Institute of Technology, and at Syracuse University.

Everett moved to Montana in 1902, where he designed the John R. Toole House in Missoula, now a Kappa Kappa Gamma sorority house. He moved to Seattle in 1904 where he designed several commercial buildings, churches and homes for prominent citizens.

He designed a home for Julius Redelsheimer who owned a department store in Seattle. Redelsheimer died of a stroke in 1914 just as the home was in the final stages of completion.

== Personal life and later years ==
Everett was a member of Phi Delta Theta fraternity and a freemason. He was married to Edith. He moved to Ventura, California in 1920 and in 1944 he relocated from Vista, California to Los Angeles. He died in Los Angeles on January 13, 1955, and a service was held for him at Chapel of the Pines Crematory.

== Work ==
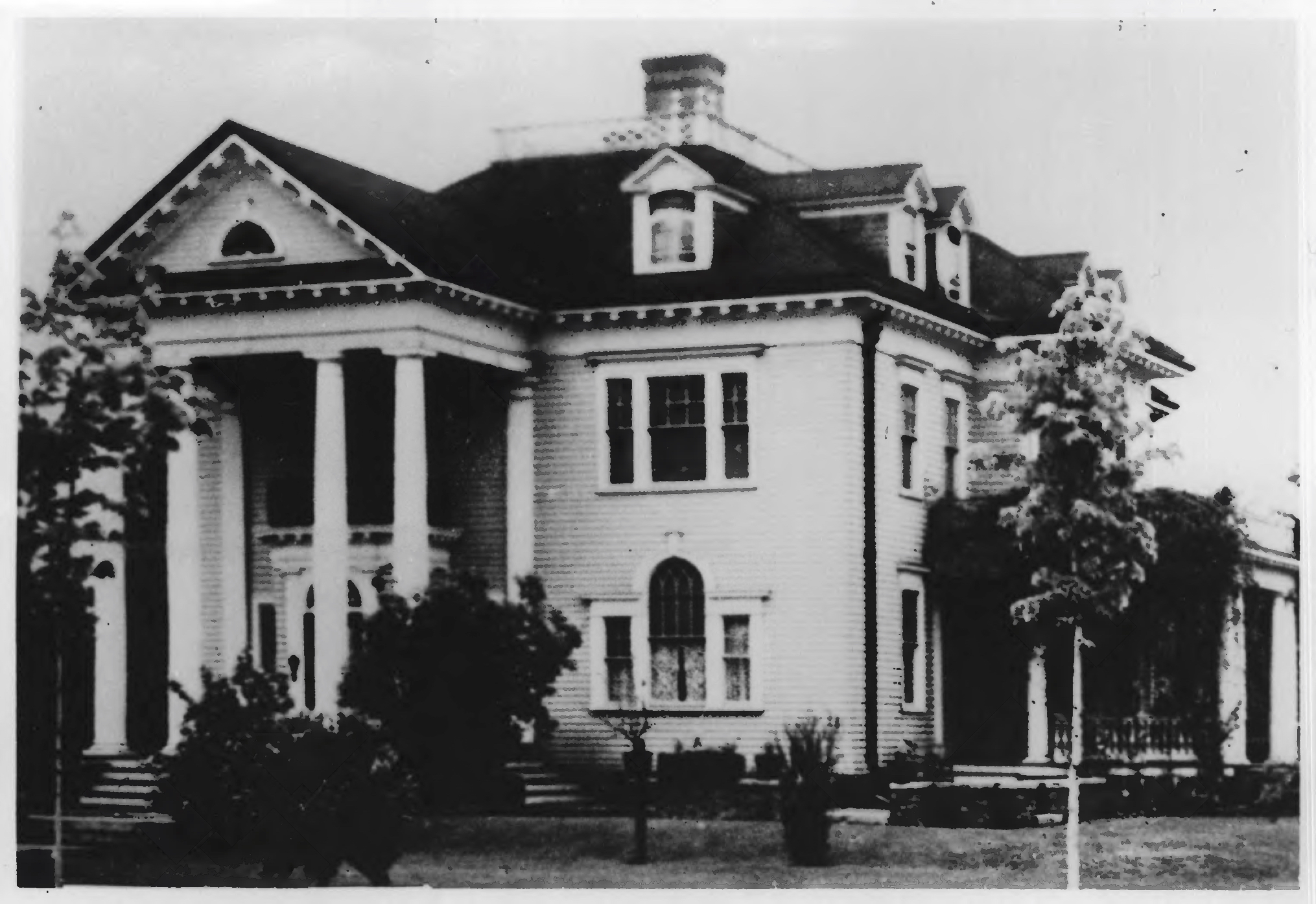
John R. Toole House in 1910

- John R. Toole House ca. 1902 for John R. Toole at 1005 Gerald Ave. Missoula, Montana. It became the Kappa Kappa Gamma sorority house, NRHP listed
- Temple de Hirsch, 15th Ave. and E. Union St., Seattle.

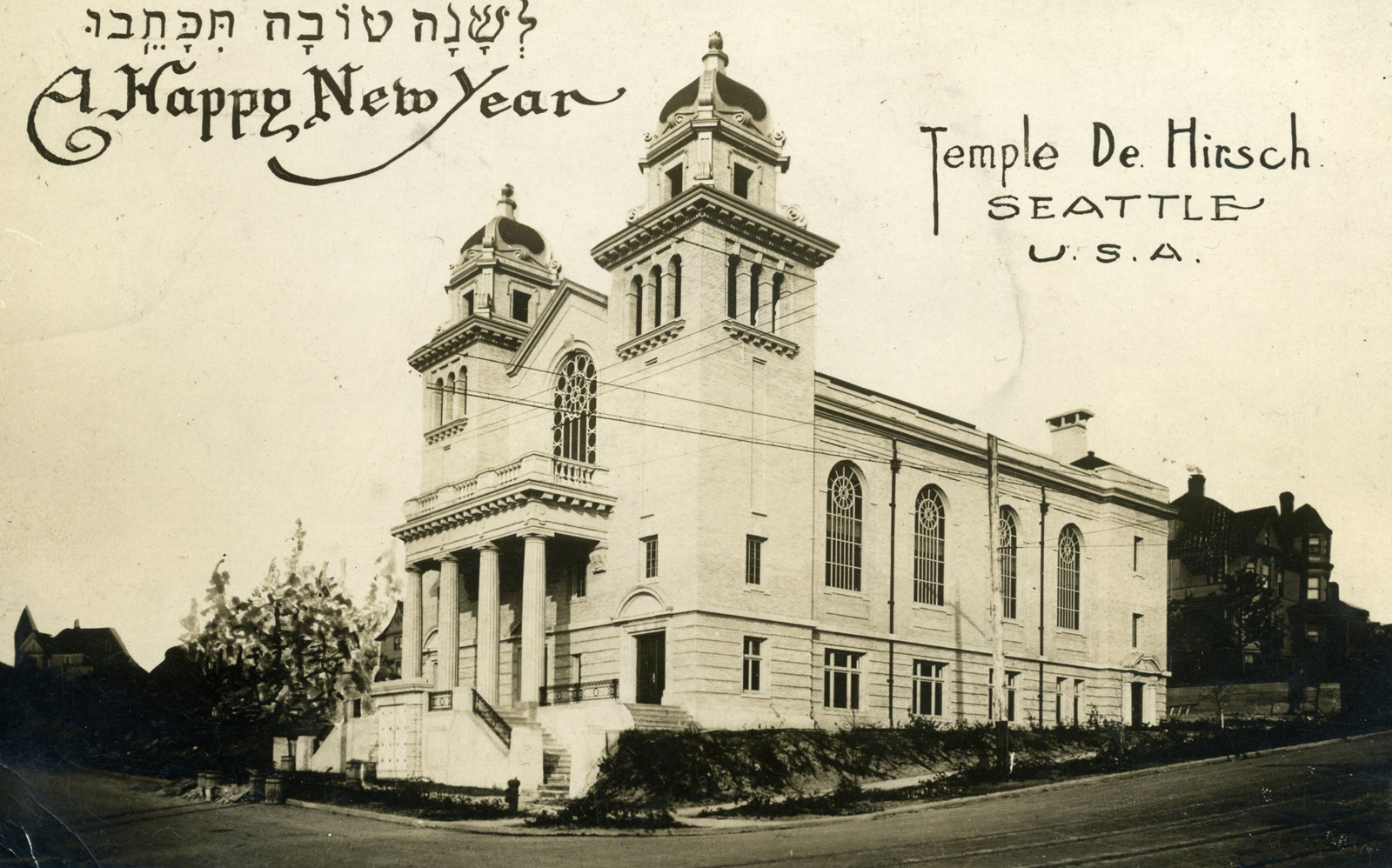
Jewish New Year card circa 1908 featuring the original, then-new, Temple De Hirsch. Although listed on the NRHP, it was demolished in 1993

- Third United Presbyterian Church (1905)
- Pilgrim Congregational Church (1906)
- Fire House No. 23 (1909) in Seattle with Frank Lindstone Baker
- Pioneer Square Comfort Station and Pergola in Seattle, now known as the Pioneer Square pergola, (1909) in Seattle's Pioneer Square - Skid Row Historic District. It is NRHP listed #71000875 as well as with the nearby totem pole and Pioneer Building as ID #77001340

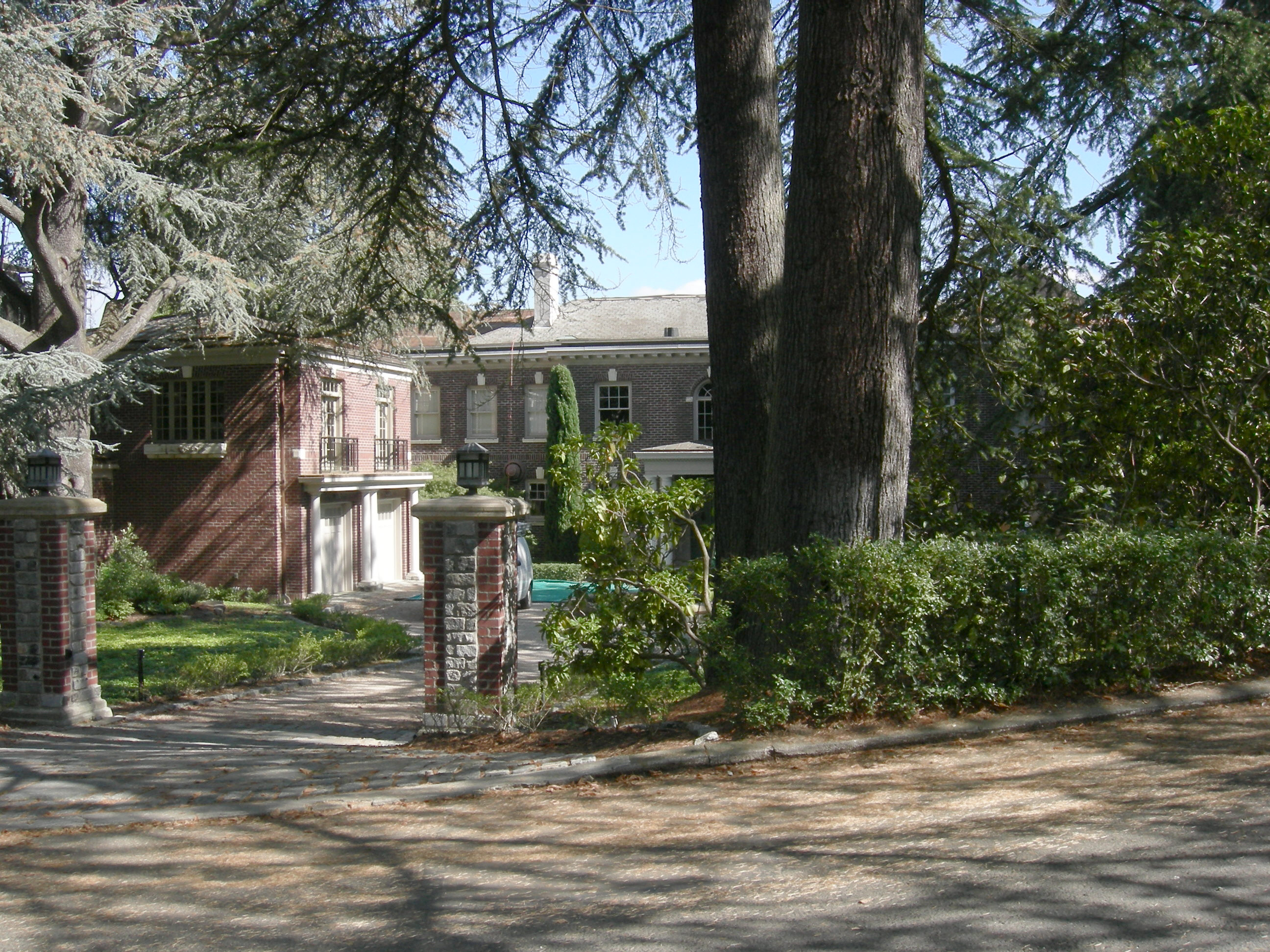
Redelsheimer-Ostrander House in Seattle, Washington

- Julius Redelsheimer residence (1906) at 200 40th Ave. E. (Redelsheimer—Ostrander House, (1910–1914) 200 40th Ave. E., Seattle. NRHP listed a 2-story brick veneer building
- George A. Smith house (1905)
- Mrs. N.O. Reichart House (1908) in Seattle
- Seattle Cracker & Candy Co. Factory (1912) in Seattle
- Leamington Hotel & Apartments (with W.R.B. Wilcox, 1916) at 317 Marion Street in Seattle. Reopened in 1995 as the Pacific Hotel with 112 units of affordable housing and recognized with the Outstanding Achievement Award in Historic Preservation by the Washington State Historic Preservation Officer
- White Motor Company Building on auto row in Capitol Hill. The terracotta-clad building was constructed in 1917 and is a City of Seattle Landmark. Everett is credited with William R. Kelley as the architect
- Kelly-Springfield Motor Truck Co. (1917) in Seattle
- Colyear-Motor Sales Co./ White Motor Co. (1918 with W.R. Kelley) in Seattle

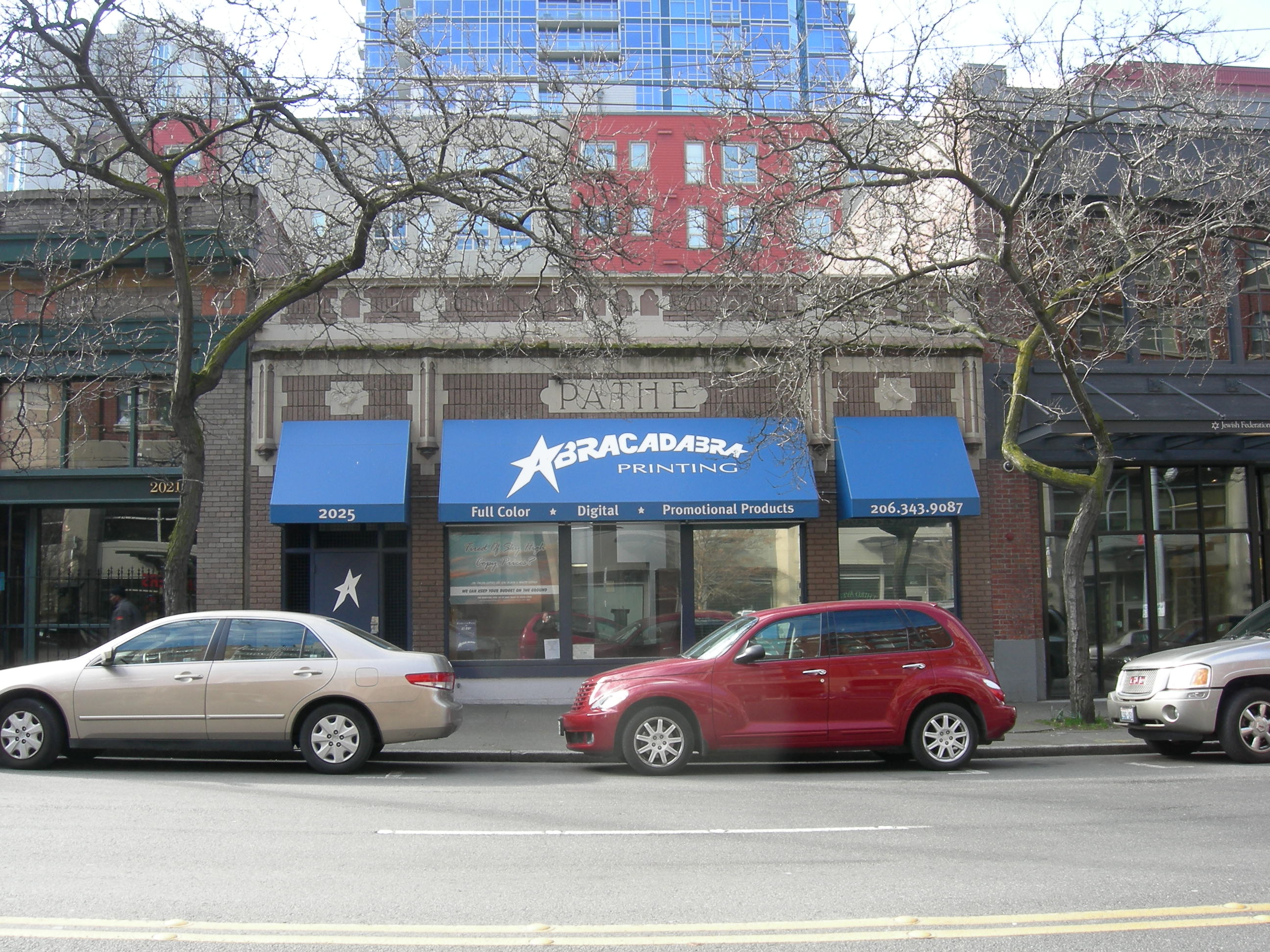
Pathé Exchange Company building in 2008 (demolished 2016)

- A building at 2025 3rd Ave. in Seattle constructed for Pathé Exchange. This was demolished in 2016.
