= Fort Tongass =

United States Army base on Tongass Island

Coordinates: 54°46′30″N 130°14′30″W

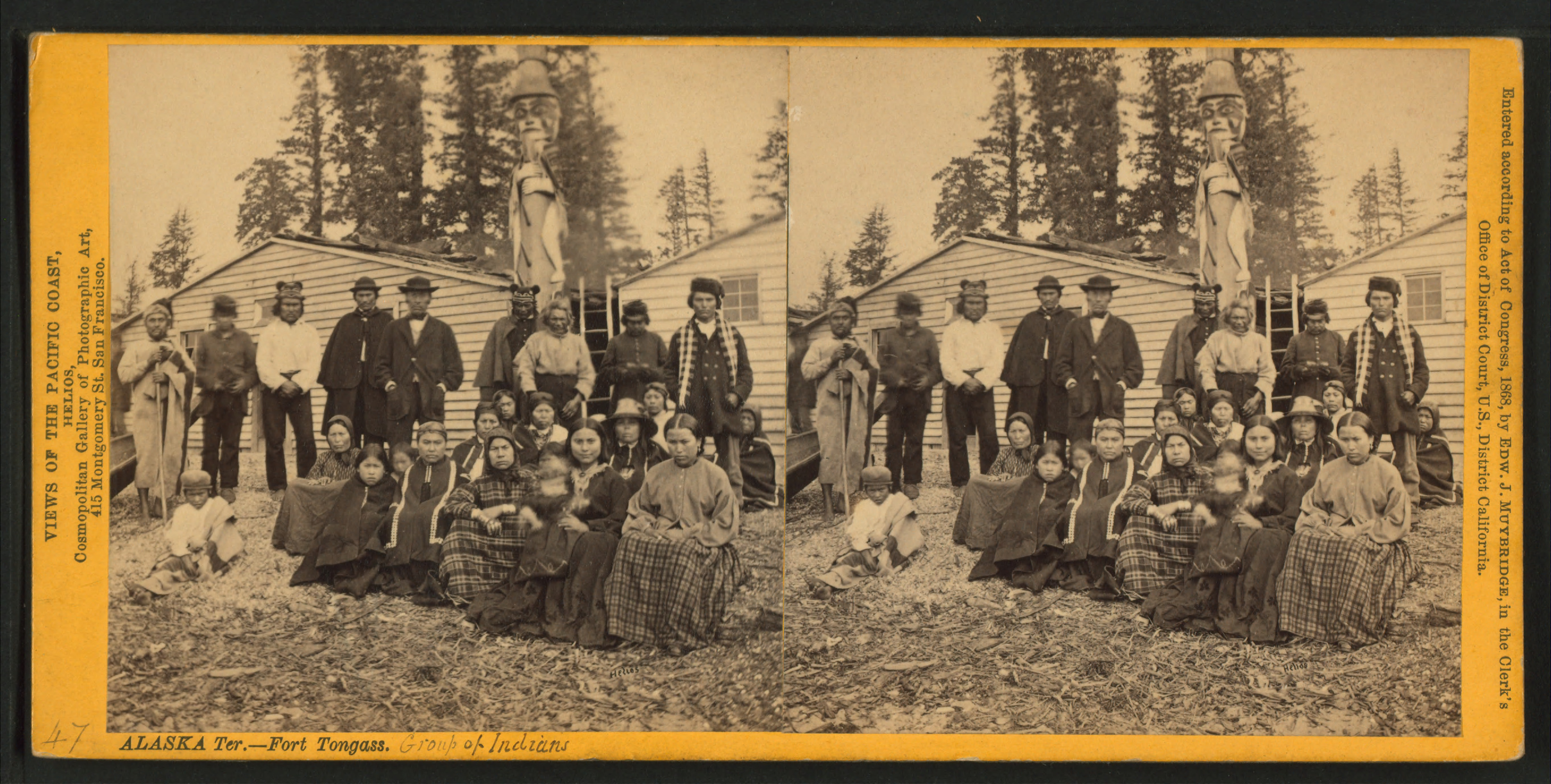
Stereo card of Fort Tongass, 1868

Fort Tongass was a United States Army base on Tongass Island, in the southernmost Alaska Panhandle, located adjacent to the village of the group of Tlingit people on the east side of the island. Fort Tongass was the first US Army base established in Alaska following its purchase from the Russian Empire in 1867 and was garrisoned by Company E, 2nd U.S. Artillery, under the command of Captain Charles H. Peirce. Historian Hubert Howe Bancroft notes: "the site was well chosen, containing a plentiful supply of timber and pasture, while fish and game abound in the neighbourhood.

The post was commissioned in 1868 and abandoned in 1870. After Alaska was established as a customs district by legislation in 1868, a deputy collector was posted to Fort Tongass as well as to Fort Wrangel, meant to intercept prospectors and commercial traffic bound for the goldfields of the Stikine River inland in British Columbia, and a revenue cutter was stationed in the area's waters. In 1868, Jefferson C. Davis, commander of the army's Military District of Alaska, visited Fort Tongass as well as Fort Wrangel and Prince of Wales Island aboard USS Saginaw, with Jefferson requesting an armed steamer be sent north to support troops in those garrisons, who had no water transport. USS Cyane was sent north in 1869, being fitted out for Alaskan service and stationed at Sitka, as support for these bases.

In 1869 a newspaper was published at Fort Tongass named the Tongass Wa-Wa ("Wa-wa" in the Chinook Jargon means "talk, speech, conversation"). After the fort's closing the name Fort Tongass became current for the name of the native village which remained. Despite the army's withdrawal, a Customs Inspector remained in residence, though having difficulty in controlling trade between the various Tlingit tribes and the Hudson's Bay Company post at Fort Simpson, which was just 15 miles south. In 1879 there were 700 Tongass under a chief named Ya-soot.

== Name origin and Tlingit village ==
The name Tongass is derived from the name of the people, which has been variously spelled Tomgas, Tont-a-quans, Tungass, Tungass-kon and Tanga'sh. The name of the Tongass people in the Tlingit language is "Taantʼa Ḵwáan" (Sea Lion Tribe), today mostly reside in Ketchikan.

Royal Navy Captain Daniel Pender, in surveying and naming the region in 1868, misconstrued Captain Peirce's name as "Pearse", in the course of naming nearby Pearse Island, which is on the Canadian side of the boundary, which runs through Tongass Passage to the east of Tongass Island. Other officers stationed to the garrison were a Lieutenant Lord, Lieutenant Murphy and a Surgeon Chismore.

== The Tongass Pole, Pioneer Square, Seattle ==
In September 1899, a tour by Seattle businessmen, artists and others of the Alaska Panhandle, sponsored by the Seattle Post-Intelligencer and aboard the vessel City of Seattle, removed a Raven clan totem pole from Tongass Village while most of the village was away fishing, and took it to Seattle, where it was erected on at First Avenue and Yesler Way on October 18, 1899, the anniversary of Alaska's transfer to the United States from Russia. The Tongass people pressed suit for damages, to the tune of $20,000, and were supported by a grand jury in Alaska which indicted twelve of the Seattle party for theft of government property (as the village was attached to Fort Tongass, then revived as a minor military base during the Klondike Gold Rush and associated boundary dispute). The case was eventually shunted aside, partly due to intervention by state representatives and senators from all the Pacific Coast states, and while the Post-Intelligencer did offer $500 compensation, these funds never reached Tongass village or the Raven clan. The pole was burned by an arsonist on October 22, 1934. A new, replica, pole was commissioned and was created by carvers at Saxman, Alaska and shipped south on SS Tanana, and was erected at the same location on July 25, 1940, and stands at Pioneer Square to this day.

== Climate ==
The extreme rainfall at Tongass was noted in a report concerning for the Canadian Pacific Railway in 1880, with the mean annual precipitation having been recorded by that point as being 118.3 inches a year, with 200 days a year being either rainy or snowy.

== Demographics ==
Historical population
Census	Pop.	Note	%±
1890	50		—

Fort Tongass appeared on the 1890 U.S. Census as an unincorporated village of 50 residents. 43 were Tlingit Natives, 6 were White and 1 was of "Mixed" race (White & Native ancestry).

== See also ==
- Fort Stikine
- Tongass National Forest
