= Sounder =

Sounder may refer to:

- Sounder (novel), a book by William H. Armstrong
- Sounder (film), a film based on the novel
- Sounder, a group of wild boar or domestic pigs foraging in woodland; see List of animal names
- Sounder, a device that transmits a signal and uses the returned signal to measure characteristics of the propagation medium
  - Echo sounder, a device used to measure water depth using sonar
  - Atmospheric sounder, also known as SODAR
- "The Sounder", a song from the 2001 Gorillaz album G-Sides

in the Seattle area:

- Sounder commuter rail, a transit system serving the Puget Sound area
- Sounder, a member of the Seattle Sounders professional soccer teams

in telecommunications:

- Sounder (music), a short musical phrase used in broadcasting and film as punctuation
- Telegraph sounder, a device for detecting operability in a telegraph
- a Windows command line audio player for WAV format

in spacecraft

- Atmospheric sounder, a space-borne instrument for passive atmospheric measurements
