= City of Seattle (steamship) =

Steamship

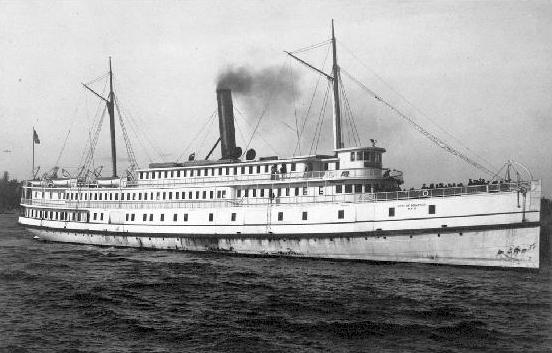

History
- Name: City of Seattle
- Builder: Neafie & Levy
- Cost: US$225,000 (equivalent to $7,874,167 in 2024
- Launched: May 14, 1890
- In service: 1890-1937
- Fate: Scrapped in 1937

General characteristics
- Type: Propeller-driven
- Tonnage: 1411 gt
- Length: 259 feet (79 m)
- Beam: 40 feet (12 m)
- Depth: 16 feet (4.9 m) depth of hold
- Speed: 14 knots running time, maximum of 18 knots

The City of Seattle was a passenger steamship built in 1890 in Philadelphia, Pennsylvania. The City of Seattle operated out of Puget Sound from 1890 to 1921, during which it ran routes between the local ports as well as Alaska, notably transporting prospectors during the Klondike Gold Rush. In 1921, the City of Seattle returned to the East Coast where it ran routes in both New York and Florida. In 1937, the City of Seattle returned to Philadelphia to be scrapped.

== History ==
The City of Seattle was built in the Neafie & Levy shipyard in Philadelphia, Pennsylvania, under orders from Captain D. B. Jackson and the Puget Sound and Alaska Steamship Company. Jackson had previously purchased the passenger steamship City of Kingston, which was running routes on Puget Sound, and the City of Seattle was intended to be its sister ship.

The City of Seattle launched on May 14, 1890, with a length of 259 feet (79 m), a 40 feet (12 m) beam, a 16 foot (4.9 m) depth of hold and was driven by an 11 foot (3.4 m) propeller. Her running time was 14 knots, however was capable of reaching 18 knots.

After months of building and fitting out the interior, which included a saloon and 135 rooms in all which allowed for a capacity of 600 passengers and 1,000 on excursions, the City of Seattle was ready to be delivered to Seattle. Captain Melville Nichols, who previously brought the City of Kingston from the East Coast to Seattle, took charge of the City of Seattle.

The City of Seattle left Philadelphia on September 21, 1890, and because the Panama Canal would not open until 1914, the City of Seattle had to make the 17,000 mile journey around Cape Horn at the southernmost tip of South America. On October 13, the City of Seattle reached Rio de Janeiro, then reached Valparaiso on November 10, before arriving at San Francisco on December 10. In San Francisco, the City of Seattle was repainted and had its boilers and machinery inspected before departing on the final leg to Seattle.

The City of Seattle arrived at Port Townsend, located at the mouth of Puget Sound, on December 24. On December 26, over 200 members of the Seattle Chamber of Commerce and their families made the trip up to Port Townsend via the City of Kingston to greet the ship and escort it back through Puget Sound to Seattle, where over 5,000 citizens welcomed her with cheers and the firing of guns. The next day, the Seattle Post-Intelligencer stated that "the City of Seattle can justly be described as the handsomest steamer on the Sound, both in construction and furnishing."

The total cost of the City of Seattle to the Puget Sound and Alaska Steamship Company was $225,000, which included $200,000 for its construction, $20,000 for delivery from Philadelphia around Cape Horn, and $5,000 for repairs in San Francisco. The City of Seattle was then put on Puget Sound routes between Seattle, the Bellingham Bay towns and Victoria. In addition, the City of Seattle would make occasional trips to Alaska during the summer.

In 1896, the City of Seattle was purchased by the Washington and Alaska Steamship Company and was then used exclusively on the Tacoma-Alaska route. When the Klondike Gold Rush began in 1897, the City of Seattle continued its Alaska runs to transport prospectors. In 1899, the City of Seattle took a group of Seattle citizens on a tour of Alaska, during which the Pioneer Square totem pole was stolen from a Tlingit village and taken back to Seattle where it was erected downtown.

At some point between 1901 and 1904, the City of Seattle was bought by the Pacific Coast Steamship Company. In 1916, the City of Seattle was transferred to the Pacific Steamship Company after the Pacific Coast Steamship Company merged with the Pacific-Alaska Navigation Company. In 1921, the City of Seattle was sold to the Miami Steamship Company with the intention of running the Miami to Jacksonville route. However, the Miami Steamship Company was soon acquired by the Clyde Steamship Company and on November 12, 1921, the City of Seattle set sail for New York to be put on the New York City to Philadelphia run. After operating in the Mid-Atlantic for almost a year, the City of Seattle set sail back to Florida and arrived in Jacksonville on September 13, 1922, in order to begin operating its originally planned Miami to Jacksonville route. In February 1924, the City of Seattle returned to New York and began running the New York City to Atlantic City line the next month.

In 1937, the City of Seattle returned to Philadelphia to be scrapped.

== Bibliography ==
- Strouse, L.K. (1924). Interstate Commerce Commission Reports: Reports and Decisions of the Interstate Commerce Commission of the United States. United States. Interstate Commerce Commission.
- Wright, E. W. (1895). Lewis & Dryden's Marine History of the Pacific Northwest: An Illustrated Review of the Growth and Development of the Maritime Industry, from the Advent of the Earliest Navigators to the Present Time, with Sketches and Portraits of a Number of Well Known Marine Men. Lewis & Dryden Printing Company.
