= Seattle (disambiguation) =

Seattle is the most populous municipality in the U.S. state of Washington.

Seattle or Seatle may also refer to:

== Seattle ==
- Chief Seattle (c. 1786–1866), Native American leader for whom the city was named
- Seattle University, a Jesuit Catholic university in the city
  - Seattle Redhawks, their varsity sports teams
- Seattle–Tacoma International Airport

== Music ==
- Seattle (album), a 1969 album by Perry Como
- "Seattle" (song), a 1968 song composed by Hugo Montenegro, later covered by Perry Como
- "Seattle", a 2009 song by The Brighton Port Authority from I Think We're Gonna Need a Bigger Boat
- "Seattle", a 1987 song by Public Image Ltd from Happy?
- "Seattle", a 2016 song by Sam Kim from I Am Sam

== Ships ==
- MS Seattle, a German cargo ship that was sunk in World War II
- USS Seattle (ACR-11), a Tennessee-class armored cruiser launched in 1905 as Washington and renamed in 1916
- USS Seattle (AOE-3), a Sacramento-class fast combat support ship launched in 1968
- City of Seattle (steam ferry)
- City of Seattle (steamship)

== Other uses ==
- Seatle, Cumbria, a location in Staveley-in-Cartmel, Cumbria, England
- Dixie Seatle, Canadian actress
- Mount Seattle, a mountain in Alaska
- Mount Seattle (Washington), a mountain in Washington state
