= Dixon Entrance =

Strait on the western Canada–United States border

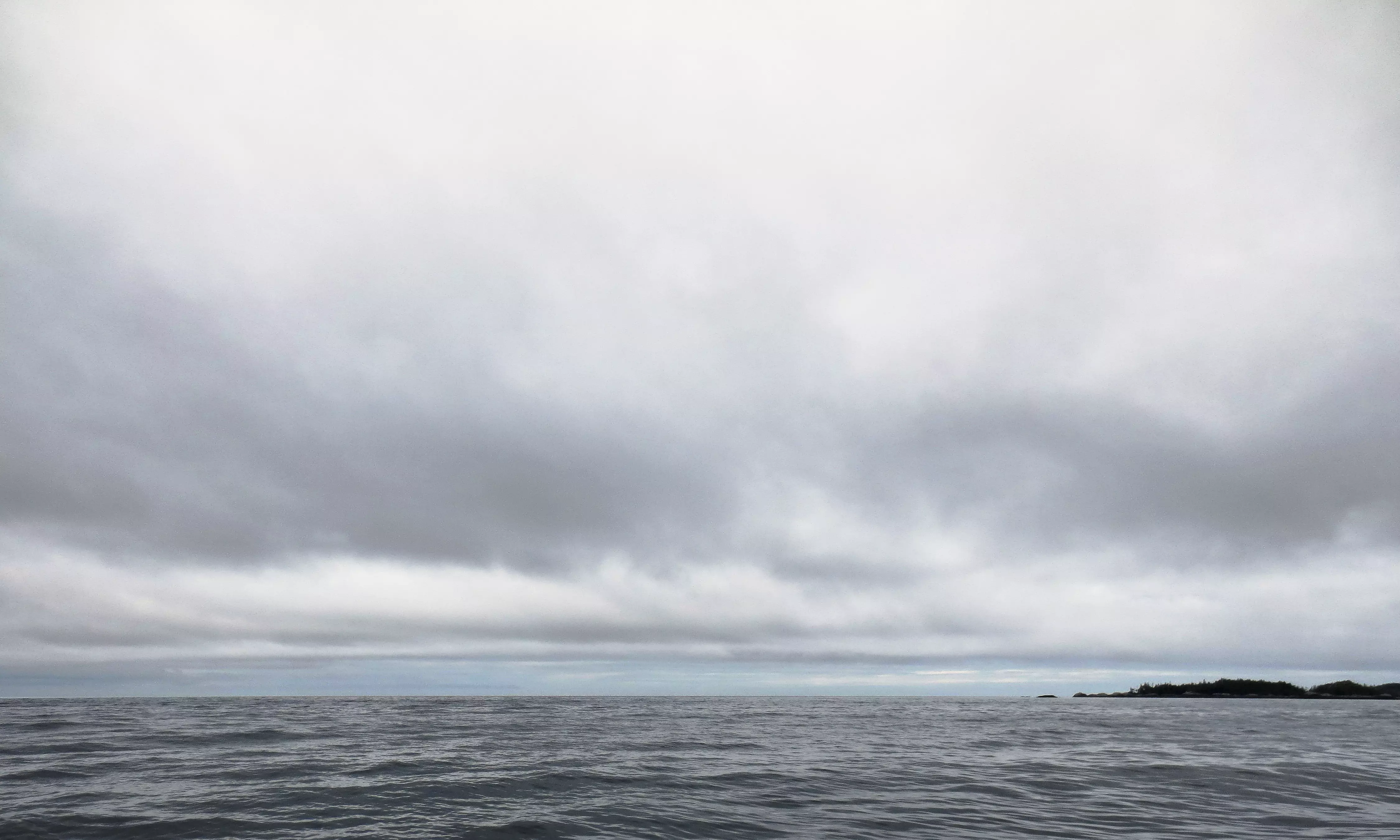
- Looking northwest across Dixon Entrance from Baron Island
- Interactive map of Dixon Entrance
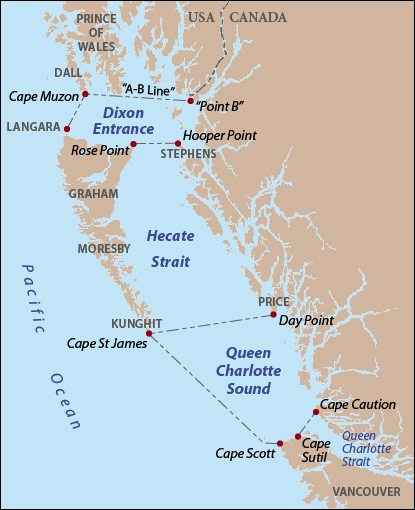
- The Dixon Entrance as delineated by BC Geographical Names and the disputed "A–B Line", along with Hecate Strait and Queen Charlotte Sound. Red dots indicate capes and points, gray text indicates island names. The international boundary between Canada and the United States follows Portland Canal to "Point B", thence, according to Canada, to Cape Muzon. The purpose and significance of the "A–B Line" portion of the boundary are disputed.
- Coordinates: 54°22′N 132°20′W
- Type: Strait
- Basin countries: Canada; United States
- Max. length: 80 km (50 mi)
- Max. width: 80 km (50 mi)

The Dixon Entrance (French: Entrée Dixon) is a strait about 80 kilometers (50 mi) long and wide in the Pacific Ocean at the Canada–United States border, between the U.S. state of Alaska and the province of British Columbia in Canada. The Dixon Entrance is part of the Inside Passage shipping route. It forms part of the maritime boundary between the U.S. and Canada, although the location of that boundary here is disputed.

== Etymology ==
The strait was named by Joseph Banks for Captain George Dixon, a Royal Navy officer, maritime fur trader, and explorer, who surveyed the area in 1787.

== Geography ==
The Dixon Entrance lies between Clarence Strait in the Alexander Archipelago in Alaska to the north, and Hecate Strait and the islands known as Haida Gwaii (the Queen Charlotte Islands) in British Columbia, to the south. Prince of Wales Island is the largest of the Alaskan islands on the north side of the entrance; the Kaigani Haida occupy this island. Members of the Haida nation maintain access across the strait under the Jay Treaty.

Major inlets that empty into Dixon Entrance include Portland Inlet, Prince Rupert Harbour, and Masset Inlet.

== Boundary dispute ==
The "A–B" line (approximately 54°40' N), which marks the northern boundary of the Dixon Entrance, was delineated by a court of arbitration set up by the 1903 Alaska Boundary Treaty. The meaning of the line remains in dispute between Canada and the United States. Canada claims the line is the international maritime boundary, while the United States holds that its purpose was only to designate the land masses belonging to each country. Hence, the U.S. does not recognize the "A–B" line as an official boundary (to govern, for example, seafloor resources or fishing rights). In 1977 the U.S. defined a maritime boundary as an equidistant line between land masses.

The two differing boundary lines intersect to create four separate water areas with different claim status. The two areas south of the "A–B" line (about 2789 km^{2} and 51.5 km^{2} in size) are claimed by both countries. The other two water areas are north of the "A–B" line and are not claimed by either country. The two unclaimed areas are about 72 km^{2} and 1.4 km^{2} in size.

In addition, Nunez Rocks is a low-tide elevation (LTE) ("bare at half-tide") that lies south of the "A–B" Line, surrounded by the sea territory claimed by the U.S. The United States has not ratified the Law of the Sea Treaty, although it adheres to most of its principles as customary international law. Under the treaty, LTEs may be used as basepoints for a territorial sea, and the U.S. uses Nunez Rocks as a basepoint. As a non-signatory, however, there is nothing preventing the U.S. from claiming areas beyond the scope of the Law of the Sea Treaty. The fact remains that, for about half of each day, above-water territory that Canada regards as Canadian is surrounded by sea territory that the U.S. has declared to be American.

Territorial fishing disputes between the countries remain today, as the United States has never shown the "A–B" line as an official boundary on its government maps.

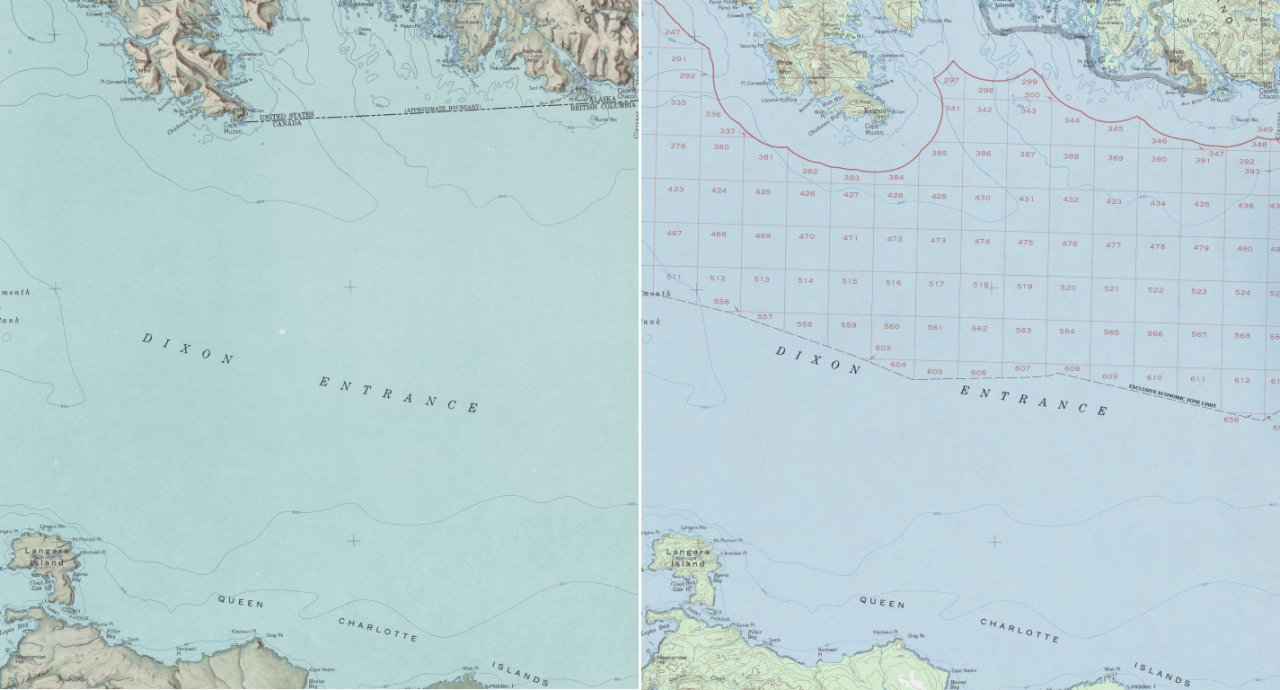
Maps of the Dixon Entrance showing the A–B Line of 1903 (left, upper dash-dot-dot line) and the boundary currently claimed by the U.S. (right, dashed black line near the label 'Dixon Entrance').

== Hazards and restrictions ==
Environment Canada comments that Dixon Entrance West "is exposed to the Pacific Ocean, although the eastern half of the marine area is relatively well protected". It is noted for prevalent fog in the summer and freezing spray in the winter. Learmouth Bank in the middle of the west entrance "enhances whatever seas are present" making conditions challenging for small craft. Tidal currents immediately north of Kiis Gwaay (Graham Island) can reach 2.5 knots creating hazardous conditions for small vessels. These hazards make transiting across the Strait quite dangerous for smaller vessels.

The eastern entrance is well protected and fog is common in the summer. Tidal currents are particularly strong north of Rose Spit, reaching 3.5 knots. Tidal rips and heavy overfalls are hazardous at all times and become very dangerous in strong winds or heavy seas with Environment Canada warning that the resulting steep waves can capsize small vessels east of Rose Spit. During southeast gales seas of 5 to 7 metres are not uncommon, occasionally reaching 9 metres.

Brown Passage, on the east of Dixon Entrance is exposed to westerly waves which will break on ebb tides of 2.5 knots. Ample weather observations in the entrance are necessary to ensure safe navigation and avoidance of hazardous conditions.

There is a moratorium on large oil tankers in a large zone that includes the Canadian exclusive economic zone of the Hecate Strait.

== See also ==
- Alaska boundary dispute
- List of areas disputed by the United States and Canada
