= City of Kingston (steamer) =

19th century American steamship

Coordinates: 47.279°N 122.458°W

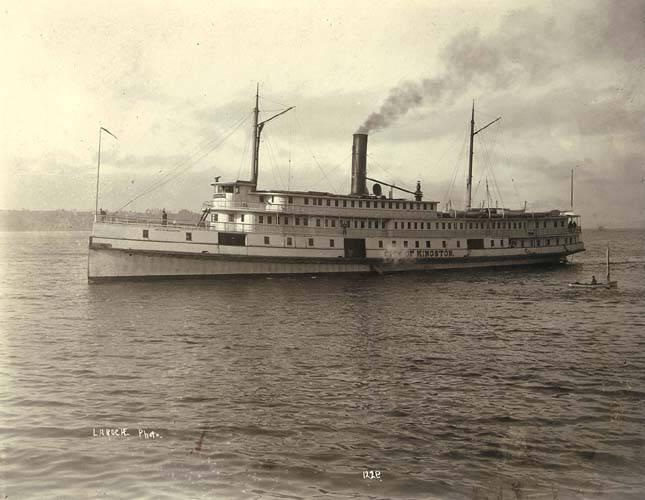
- Steamship City of Kingston on Puget Sound in 1892

History
- Name: City of Kingston
- Builder: Wilmington, Delaware
- Launched: 1884
- Fate: Collided with ship and sank April 23, 1900

General characteristics
- Type: Steamship

City of Kingston was a steamship launched in 1884. It was built in Wilmington, Delaware. It was used on the Hudson River before a change of ownership brought it to Puget Sound. The New York Times reported in December 1889 that it was heard from in Barbados after being feared lost.

Its sister ship was City of Seattle, built in Philadelphia in 1890.

City of Kingston collided with Glenogle on April 23, 1900 near Tacoma, Washington and sunk. The loss was calculated to be $150,000. There were no deaths. Glenogle survived with $20,000 in damage.
