= Tongass Island =

Island in Alaska

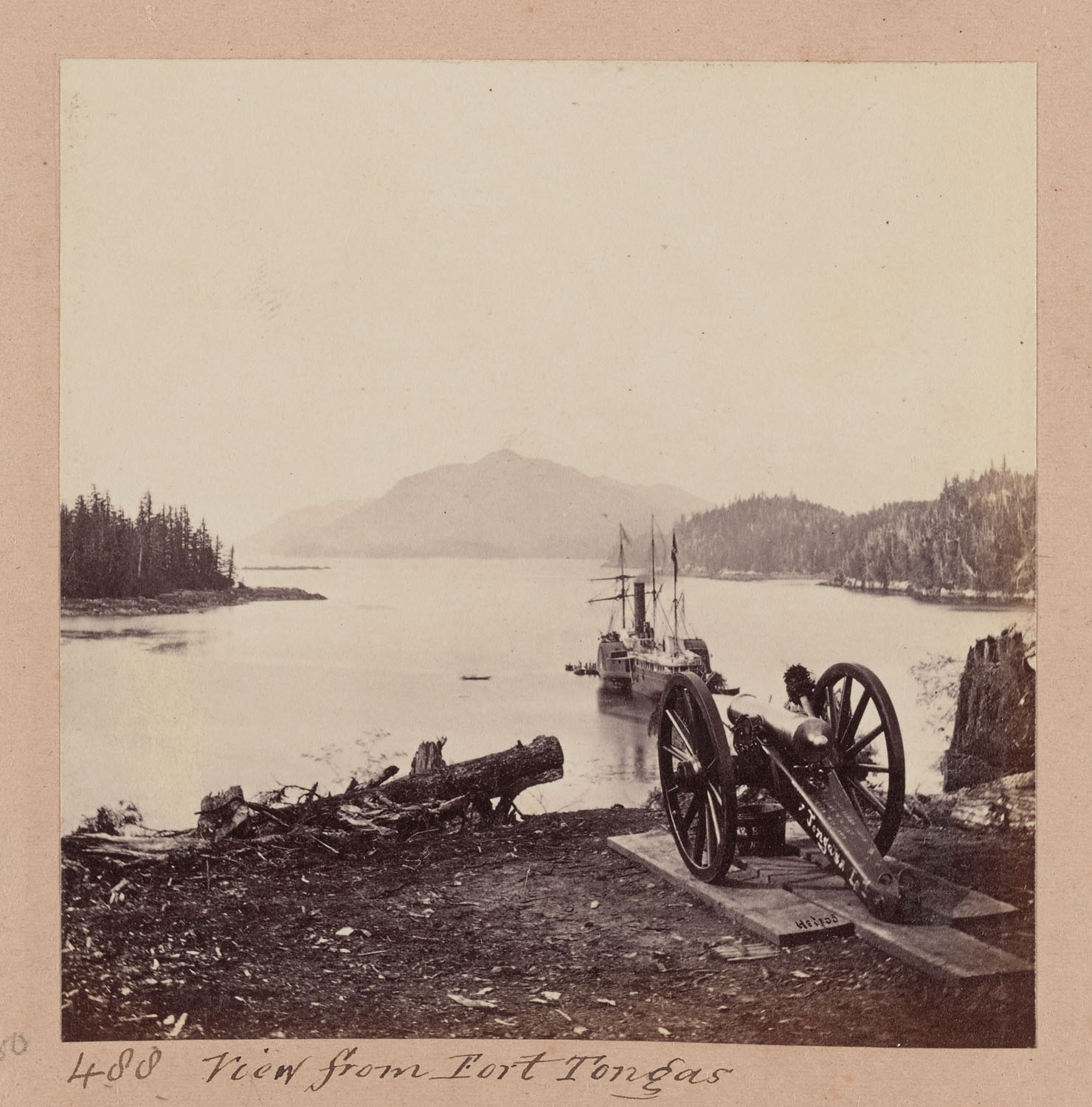
- View of steam sidewheel steamer Pacific taken from Fort Tongass, Tongass Island, US Military District of Alaska, 1868.

- Location within Alaska

Geography
- Location: Alaska Panhandle
- Coordinates: 54°46′22″N 130°44′22″W
- Archipelago: Alexander Archipelago
- Length: 0.8 mi (1.3 km)

Administration
- United States
- State: Alaska
- Borough: Ketchikan Gateway Borough

Tongass Island, historically also spelled Tongas Island, is an island in the southern Alaska Panhandle, near the marine boundary with Canada at 54–40 N. It was the site of Fort Tongass, which was established shortly after the Alaska Purchase as a customs port for travelers bound from British Columbian waters to the Stikine River, which was one of the main routes of access to the Cassiar Gold Rush of the 1870s. It lies west of Port Tongass in Nakat Bay, adjacent to the Dixon Entrance and is 0.8 miles in length. Its Native Alaskan name Kut-tuk-wah was published in 1869 by the United States Coast and Geodetic Survey; its current name was first published in 1891.

Tongass Island is in Misty Fjords National Monument and wilderness, part of Tongass National Forest.

The Pioneer Square totem pole which now stands in Seattle, Washington state, was stolen from Tongass Island in 1899 by the Seattle Chamber of Commerce. The totem pole was initially carved around the year 1790 and belonged to the Kinninook family, a Tlingit clan of the Raven moiety. It was carved to honor Chief-of-All-Women, a Tlingit woman who drowned in the Nass River while traveling to visit an ill sister. Her family hired a carver and gathered to tell him stories they wanted represented on her totem pole. When the totem pole was complete, they organized a potlatch and raised the totem pole in her honor in the Tlingit village on Tongass Island. It was one of the few totem poles dedicated to a woman.

== Sources ==
- Garfield, Viola E. (1996). Seattle's Totem Poles. Thistle Press. ISBN 978-0-9621935-4-5.
- Jonaitis, Aldona (2017). Discovering Totem Poles: A Traveler's Guide. University of Washington Press. ISBN 9780295806884.
- Wilma, David (January 1, 2000). "Stolen totem pole unveiled in Seattle". HistoryLink.
- U.S. Geological Survey Geographic Names Information System: Tongass Island
