= Pearse Island =

Island in British Columbia, Canada

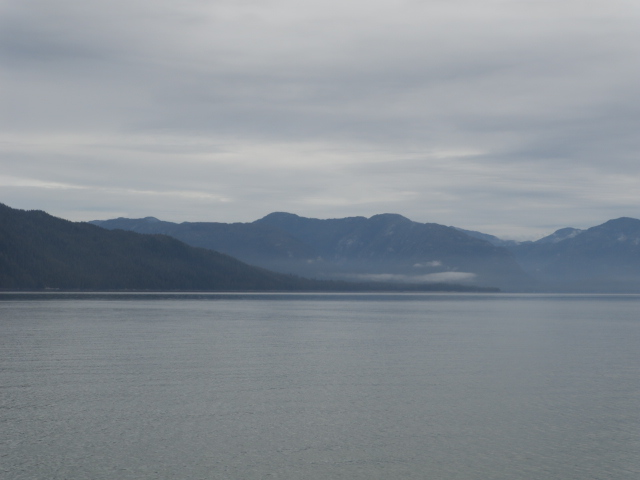
- Wil Milit on Pearse Island
- Interactive map of Pearse Island

Geography
- Location: Pacific Ocean
- Coordinates: 54°53′N 130°18′W
- Area: 210 km^{2} (81 sq mi)

Administration
- Canada
- Province: British Columbia
- Land district: Range 5 Coast Land District

Additional information
- Time zone: Pacific Time Zone (UTC−08:00)

Pearse Island is an island in western British Columbia, Canada, in the Portland Inlet, an inlet of the Pacific Ocean. The island was first charted in 1793 by George Vancouver during his 1791-95 expedition. It was named by George Henry Richards, captain of HMS Plumper, circa 1860, in honour of William Alfred Rombulow Pearse of the Royal Navy, who had been commander of HMS Alert.

== Location and territorial claims ==
The island is 210 km^{2} (81 sq mi) in size. It is separated from the mainland of Alaska by the 2 km (1.2 mi) wide Pearse Canal, which forms part of the Canada–United States border in this area. The island is 56 km (35 mi) north of Prince Rupert, British Columbia. It and neighbouring islands figured in one of the territorial and marine-boundary quarrels of the Alaska boundary dispute (the island was formerly claimed by the United States).

== Features ==
=== Wil Milit ===
Wil Milit (Formerly Pearse Island Indian Reserve No. 43 ) is on the northeast end of the island. The area includes montane forests, floodplains, swamps, bogs, shallow water marine environments, and estuarine and tidal marshes.

Western LNG, a Houston-based company, with the Nisga’a Nation and Rockies LNG, is proposing Ksi Lisims LNG, to process 12 million tonnes per annum on the northern tip of Pearse Island near the Nisga’a village of Gingolx, British Columbia.

=== Winter Inlet Conservancy ===
Winter inlet is a fjord located at the south end of the island, it nearly bisects the island and affords secure anchorage for small craft. The Conservancy is located in the land around the head of Winter Inlet, covers 30 ha (74 acres) of the surrounding land, and was designated in 2008 as part of the North Coast Land and Resource Management Plan.

== See also ==
- Hay-Herbert Treaty
- Wales Island (British Columbia)
