= Portland Inlet =

Inlet on the coast of British Columbia, Canada

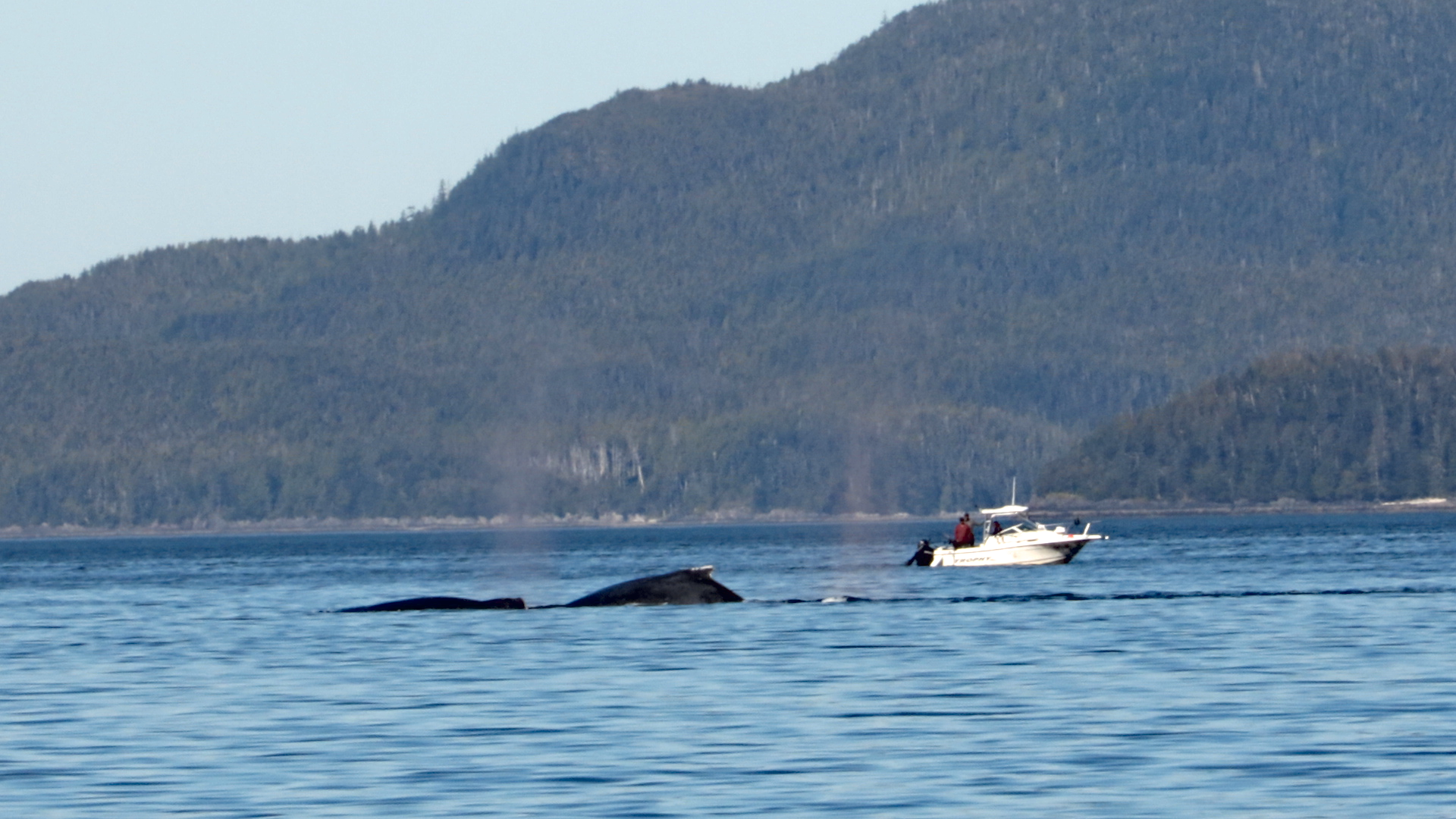
- Looking east across Portland Inlet toward Somerville Island

- Location in British Columbia
- Location: British Columbia, Canada
- Coordinates: 54°50′51″N 130°12′55″W
- Type: Inlet
- Primary outflows: Chatham Sound
- Ocean/sea sources: Pacific Ocean
- Surface area: 260 square kilometres (100 sq mi)

Portland Inlet is an inlet of the Pacific Ocean on the north coast of British Columbia, Canada, approximately 55 km (34 mi) north of Prince Rupert. It joins Chatham Sound opposite the Dixon Entrance. The Nisga'a assert that the inlet constitutes part of their ancient territory.

The inlet is 40 km (25 mi) long and as much as 13 km (8.1 mi) wide. It drains the Portland Canal, Nass Bay (outlet of the Nass River), and Khutzeymateen Inlet, among others, and is the site of Pearse Island and Somerville Island. Other major sidewaters of the inlet are Observatory Inlet and its east arm, Alice Arm.

Portland Inlet was mapped by the Vancouver Expedition in 1793 and named Brown Inlet, with George Vancouver later changing the name to honour the British House of Portland.

In winter, the inlet is subject to strong katabatic winds, with the most powerful outflow events measured in British Columbia.

== See also ==
- Fjords of Canada
