= Alaska boundary dispute =

1867–1903 territorial dispute between the US and UK

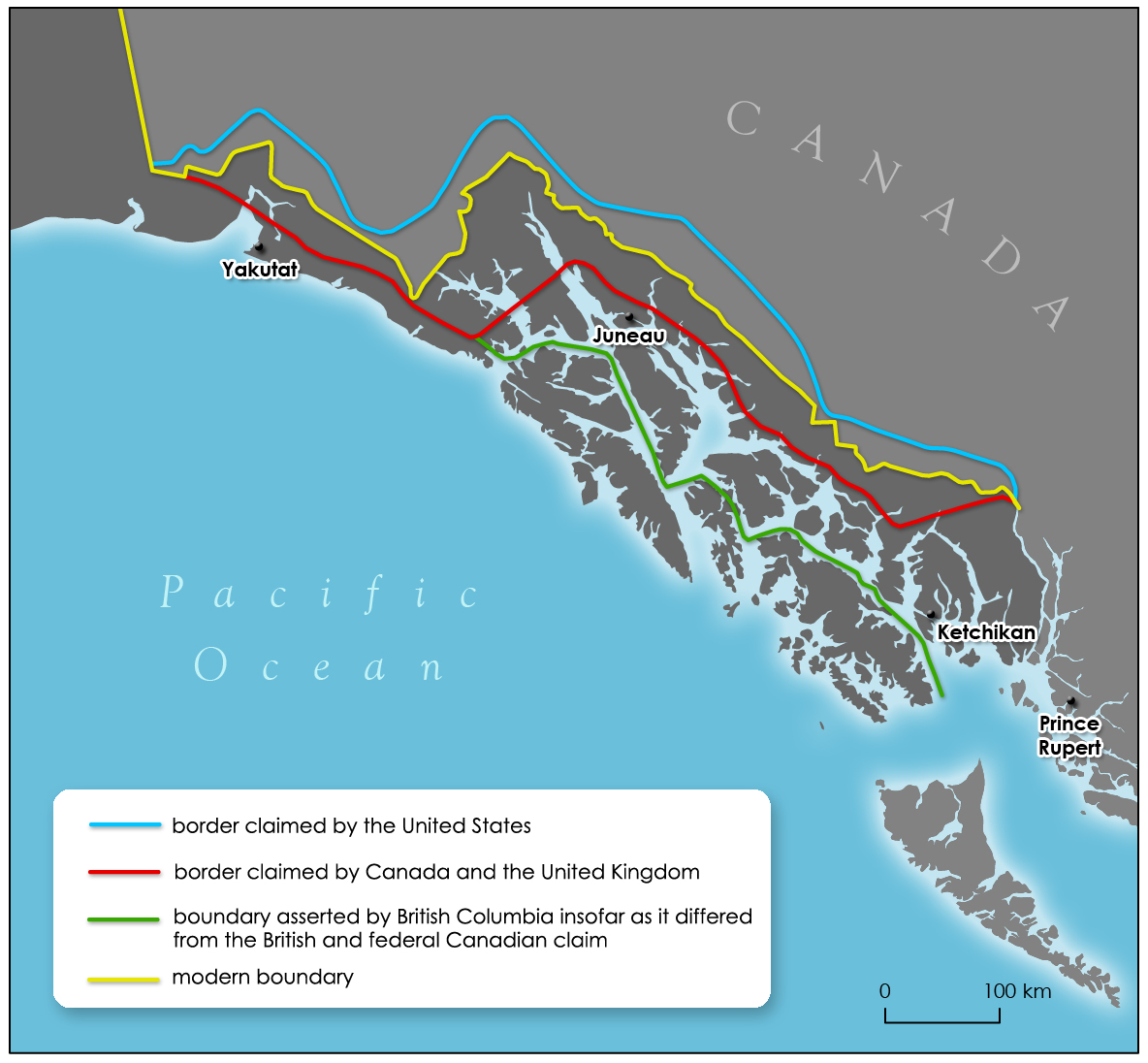
- Map showing the differing US (blue) and British/Canadian (red) territorial claims, and the final boundary fixed by arbitration in 1903 (yellow line)
- Date: 1898–1903
- Location: Alaska Panhandle / British Columbia border
- Participants: United States; Canada; (United Kingdom) British Empire
- Outcome: Resolution by a six-member international tribunal; Joint boundary fixed heavily in favor of the United States claim; Increased Canadian desire for full foreign policy autonomy from Britain

The Alaska boundary dispute was a territorial dispute between the United States and the British Empire over the Canada–United States border regarding Alaska between the 1890s and 1900s. As Canada was then a British dominion, the United Kingdom held the responsibility of negotiating with the American government over the dispute, which had existed since 1825 between Britain and Russia. Following the United States' acquisition of Alaska from Russia in 1867, the Canada–Alaska border continued to be disputed, which intensified following the 1897 Klondike Gold Rush in Yukon.

Eventually, Anglo-American negotiations led to the dispute being resolved by arbitration in 1903. The final resolution favored the American position, as Canada did not get an all-Canadian outlet from Yukon's gold fields to the Pacific Ocean. News of the dispute's outcome was met with widespread anger in Canada, which viewed the British government as betraying them by prioritizing better Anglo-American relations over Canadian interests.

== Background ==
=== 1825–1897 ===
In 1825 Russia and the United Kingdom signed a treaty to define the borders of their respective colonial possessions, the Anglo-Russian Convention of 1825. Part of the wording of the treaty was that:

the said line shall ascend to the north along the channel called Portland Channel as far as the point of the continent where it strikes the 56th degree of north latitude; from this last-mentioned point, the line of demarcation shall follow the summit of the mountains situated parallel to the coast as far as the point of intersection of the 141st degree of west longitude

The vague phrase "the mountains parallel to the coast" was further qualified thus:

Whenever the summit of the mountains ... shall prove to be at the distance of more than ten marine leagues from the ocean, the limit ... shall be formed by a line parallel to the winding of the coast, and which shall never exceed the distance of ten marine leagues therefrom.

This part of the treaty language was an agreement on general principles for establishing a boundary in the area in the future, rather than any exact demarcated line.

Signed in 1839, the RAC–HBC Agreement created an understanding between the Russian-American Company and the Hudson's Bay Company. Typically referred to as the lisière (edge), a stretch of the Alaskan Panhandle from Cross Sound to 54°40′ was given to the HBC as a fur trade monopoly in exchange for the agricultural and pastoral products produced by its subsidiary, the Puget Sound Agricultural Company, along with an annual amount of furs given to the Russian company. The lease was renewed until the end of Russian America. This lease was later brought up by the Province of British Columbia as bearing upon its own territorial interests in the region, but was ignored by Ottawa and London.

The United States bought Alaska in 1867 from the Russian Empire in the Alaska Purchase, but the boundary terms were ambiguous. In 1871, British Columbia united with the new Dominion of Canada. The Canadian government requested a survey of the boundary, but the United States rejected it as too costly; the border area was very remote and sparsely settled, and without economic or strategic interest. In 1898, the national governments agreed on a compromise, but the government of British Columbia rejected it. U.S. President McKinley proposed a permanent lease to Canada of a port near Haines, but Canada rejected that compromise.

=== Klondike gold rush ===
In 1897–98 the Klondike Gold Rush in Yukon, Canada, enormously increased the population of the general area, which reached 30,000, composed largely of Americans. Some 100,000 fortune seekers moved through Alaska to the Klondike gold region. From a population of 500 in 1896, the village's population grew to approximately 17,000 people by summer 1898.

The presence of gold and a large new population greatly increased the importance of the region and the desirability of fixing an exact boundary. Canada wanted an all-Canadian route from the gold fields to a seaport. There were reports that Canadian citizens were harassed by the United States as a deterrent to making any land claims.

The head of Lynn Canal was the main gateway to the Yukon, and the North-West Mounted Police (NWMP) sent a detachment to secure the location for Canada. This was based on Canada's assertion that that location was more than ten marine leagues from the sea, which was part of the 1825 boundary definition. A massive influx of American stampeders through Skagway very quickly forced the Canadian police to retreat. They set up posts on the desolate summits of Chilkoot and White Passes. This was still disputed territory, as many Americans believed that the head of Lake Bennett, another 12 miles (19 km) north, should be the location of the border. To back up the police in their sovereignty claim, the Canadian government also sent the Yukon Field Force, a 200-man Army unit, to the territory. The soldiers set up camp at Fort Selkirk so that they could be fairly quickly dispatched to deal with problems at either the coastal passes or the 141st meridian west.

== Arbitration ==
The posts set up on the passes by the NWMP were effective in the short term, as the provisional boundary was accepted, if grudgingly. In September 1898, serious negotiations began between the United States and Canada to settle the issue, but those meetings failed.

The treaty of 1825 had been drawn up in French, and the 1903 British advocates discussed the exact meaning of words like "côte/coast", "lisière/strip" and "crête/crest". The maps of George Vancouver, which were used as a fixing line by the commission of 1825, showed a continuous line of mountains parallel to the coast — however, the mountain range is neither parallel to the coast nor continuous.

Finally, in 1903, the Hay–Herbert Treaty between the United States and the United Kingdom entrusted the decision to an arbitration by a mixed tribunal of six members: three Americans (Elihu Root, Secretary of War; Henry Cabot Lodge, senator from Massachusetts; and George Turner, ex-senator from Washington), two Canadians (Sir Louis A. Jette, Lieutenant Governor of Quebec; and Allen B. Aylesworth, K.C., from Toronto), and one Briton (Baron Alverstone). Aylesworth had replaced John D. Armour, the Chief Justice of Ontario, who died in London on July 11, 1903, while working on the boundary commission. All sides respected Root, but he was a member of the U.S. Cabinet. Canadians ridiculed the choice of the obscure ex-Senator Turner and, especially, Lodge, a leading historian and diplomatic specialist whom they saw as unobjective.

The tribunal considered six main points:

- Where the boundary began.
- What "Portland Channel" meant, and how to draw the boundary line through it. Four islands were in dispute.
- The definition of the line from "the southernmost point of Prince of Wales Island to Portland Channel", which depended on the answer to the previous question.
- The line from Portland Channel to the 56th parallel north.
- The width of the lisière (border or edge), and how to measure it.
- Whether mountain ranges existed in the area.

The British member Lord Alverstone sided with the U.S. position on these basic issues. The agreed demarcation line was a compromise falling roughly between the maximal U.S. and maximal Canadian claim. The "BC Panhandle" (the Tatshenshini-Alsek region) was not quite exclaved from the rest of British Columbia.

In 1929, Canadian scholar Hugh L. L. Keenlyside concluded, "The Americans, of course, did have the better case." He judged that most of the tribunal's decisions were fair. Regarding the key issue of the islands in the Portland Channel, however,

there can be little doubt that the tribunal in this instance accepted a compromise, which, however justified by the political considerations involved, was a direct violation of the judicial character of the court. Instead of accepting either the American or the British claim in toto, the line was drawn through Tongas Passage, thus giving each country a portion of its claim, but entirely disregarding the real problem involved. The original negotiators might, logically, have intended the line to be drawn either as the British claimed or as the Americans claimed; certainly they had no intention of dividing the channel islands between the two ... There can be scarcely any doubt that Lord Alverstone's final pronouncement was merely an attempt to rationalize a political expedient ... In all but one case they seem justified by the facts, and yet that one case of political compromise tarnished the whole award.

This was one of several concessions that Britain offered to the United States (the others being on fisheries and the Panama Canal). It was part of a general policy of ending the chill in Britain–U.S. relations, achieving rapprochement, winning American favor, and resolving outstanding issues (the Great Rapprochement).

== Aftermath ==
=== Growth of a distinct Canadian identity ===
Keenlyside and Brown wrote that

Had the United States been willing to submit her case to The Hague, or to an impartial juridical body, as Canada had desired, the result would have been, in all probability, substantially the same, except that Canadians could not feel that they had been unfairly treated. ... Had justices of the United States Supreme Court been appointed in the place of the two Senators, Canadian criticism of the award would not have been audible.

The Canadian judges refused to sign the award, issued on 20 October 1903, due to the Canadian delegates' disagreement with Lord Alverstone's vote. Canadians protested the outcome, not so much the decision itself but that the Americans had chosen politicians instead of jurists for the tribunal, and that the British had prioritized better Anglo-American relations over Canadian interests. This led to a wave of anger at Britain throughout Canada as well as a surge in Canadian nationalism as separate from an imperial identity. Although suspicions of the U.S. provoked by the award may have contributed to Canada's rejection of a free trade with the United States in the 1911 "reciprocity election", historian F. W. Gibson concluded that Canadians vented their anger less upon the United States and "to a greater degree upon Great Britain for having offered such feeble resistance to American aggressiveness. The circumstances surrounding the settlement of the dispute produced serious dissatisfaction with Canada's position in the British Empire." Infuriated, like most Canadians, Prime Minister Wilfrid Laurier explained to Parliament, "So long as Canada remains a dependency of the British Crown the present powers that we have are not sufficient for the maintenance of our rights." Canadian anger gradually subsided, but the feeling that Canada should control its own foreign policy may have contributed to the Statute of Westminster.

== See also ==
- List of areas disputed by the United States and Canada
- Foreign relations of Canada
- Canada–United States border
- Canada–United States relations
- Canada–United Kingdom relations
- United Kingdom–United States relations
- Aroostook War
- Pig War
- Oregon boundary dispute
- List of Boundary Peaks of the Alaska–British Columbia/Yukon border
