= Jorkins Point =

Cape on Swindle Island, British Columbia

- Cape
- Location within British Columbia
- Coordinates: 52.43236°N 128.49918°W
- Location: Swindle Island, Regional District of Kitimat-Stikine, British Columbia, Canada
- Elevation: 26 m (85 ft)
- Topo map: NTS 103A8 Spiller Channel

Jorkins Point is a cape in Canada. It is located on Swindle Island in the Regional District of Kitimat-Stikine in the province of British Columbia in the southwestern part of Canada, 3,800 km (2,360 miles) west of Canada's capital, Ottawa. (Note: Calculated from height data (DEM 3) from Viewfinder Panoramas at http://www.viewfinderpanoramas.org/dem3.html. More about the algorithm can be found on Swedish Wikipedia at sv:Användare:Lsjbot/Algoritmer.)

== Geography ==
Jorkins Point forms the southern tip of Swindle Island and lies at the confluence of Milbanke Sound and Finlayson Channel. There are an unusually large number of named landforms in the vicinity of Jorkins Point, including peninsulas, islands, bays, and features on the seafloor. (Note: Significantly more named landforms within a 20-km (12.4-mile) radius compared to the average occurrence of named ones on earth, according to GeoNames.)

The terrain inland from Jorkins Point on Swindle Island is hilly to the northeast, but to the southwest it is flat. (Note: Calculated from the variation in all height data (DEM 3) within a 10-km (6.2-mile) radius from Viewfinder Panoramas at http://www.viewfinderpanoramas.org/dem3.html. More about the algorithm can be found on Swedish Wikipedia at sv:Användare:Lsjbot/Algoritmer.) The highest point in the vicinity is 1.4 km (0.9 mile) northwest of Jorkins Point and is 318 meters (1,043 feet) above sea level. (Note: Calculated from height data (DEM 3) from Viewfinder Panoramas at http://www.viewfinderpanoramas.org/dem3.html. More about the algorithm can be found on Swedish Wikipedia at sv:Användare:Lsjbot/Algoritmer.)

== Population ==
The area around Jorkins Point is almost uninhabited, with less than two inhabitants per square kilometer (0.8 inhabitants per square mile). There are no communities nearby.

== Climate ==
The climate in the area is temperate. The annual average temperature in the area is 6 °C (42.8 °F). The hottest month is July, when the average temperature is 16 °C (60.8 °F), and the coldest is December, at -2 °C (28.4 °F).

Climate data for Jorkins Point
Month	Jan	Feb	Mar	Apr	May	Jun	Jul	Aug	Sep	Oct	Nov	Dec	Year
Mean daily maximum °C (°F)	−1 (30)	3 (37)	7 (45)	7 (45)	13 (55)	17 (63)	19 (66)	16 (61)	11 (52)	9 (48)	3 (37)	−1 (30)	9 (47)
Daily mean °C (°F)	—	—	—	—	—	—	16 (61)	—	—	—	—	−2 (28)	6 (43)
Mean daily minimum °C (°F)	−4 (25)	0 (32)	−2 (28)	2 (36)	6 (43)	9 (48)	12 (54)	13 (55)	8 (46)	5 (41)	−1 (30)	−4 (25)	4 (39)
