= Sarah Island (British Columbia) =

Island in British Columbia, Canada

Coordinates: 52°46′00″N 128°30′00″W

Sarah Island is an island in the North Coast of British Columbia, Canada. It is separated from Princess Royal Island to its west by Tolmie Channel, and from Roderick Island to its east by Finlayson Channel. Its east coast was first charted in 1793 by James Johnstone, one of George Vancouver's lieutenants during his 1791-95 expedition.
