= Yeo Island =

Island in British Columbia, Canada

Coordinates: 52°21′00″N 128°08′00″W

Yeo Island is an island in the North Coast region of British Columbia, Canada. It is separated from the Don Peninsula to its west by Spiller Channel, and from the Coldwell Peninsula to its east by Bullock Channel. It was first charted and circumnavigated in 1793 by James Johnstone, one of George Vancouver's lieutenants during his 1791–95 expedition.

It was named for Dr. Gerald Yeo, a surgeon on HMS Ganges on the Pacific Station, 1857–1860.
