= Lake Island (British Columbia) =

Island in British Columbia, Canada

- Interactive map of Lake Island

Geography
- Location: British Columbia
- Coordinates: 52.352°N 128.356°W

Administration
- Canada

Lake Island is an island on the coast of the Canadian province of British Columbia. It is located between Mathieson Channel and Lady Trutch Passage, and is flanked by Dowager Island (to the northwest), Lady Douglas Island (to the west), and a long finger shaped peninsula of the Canadian mainland to the east. Lake Island is not a lake island, as it is in an inlet of the Pacific Ocean, and lies only some 6 kilometres from the open sea.

Lake Island is part of a volcanic area called the Milbanke Sound Group and includes monogenetic cinder cones. Basaltic tuff breccias on Lake Island originated from Helmet Peak.

== See also ==
- List of islands of Canada
