= Pooley Island =

Island in British Columbia, Canada

Coordinates: 52°43′00″N 128°14′00″W

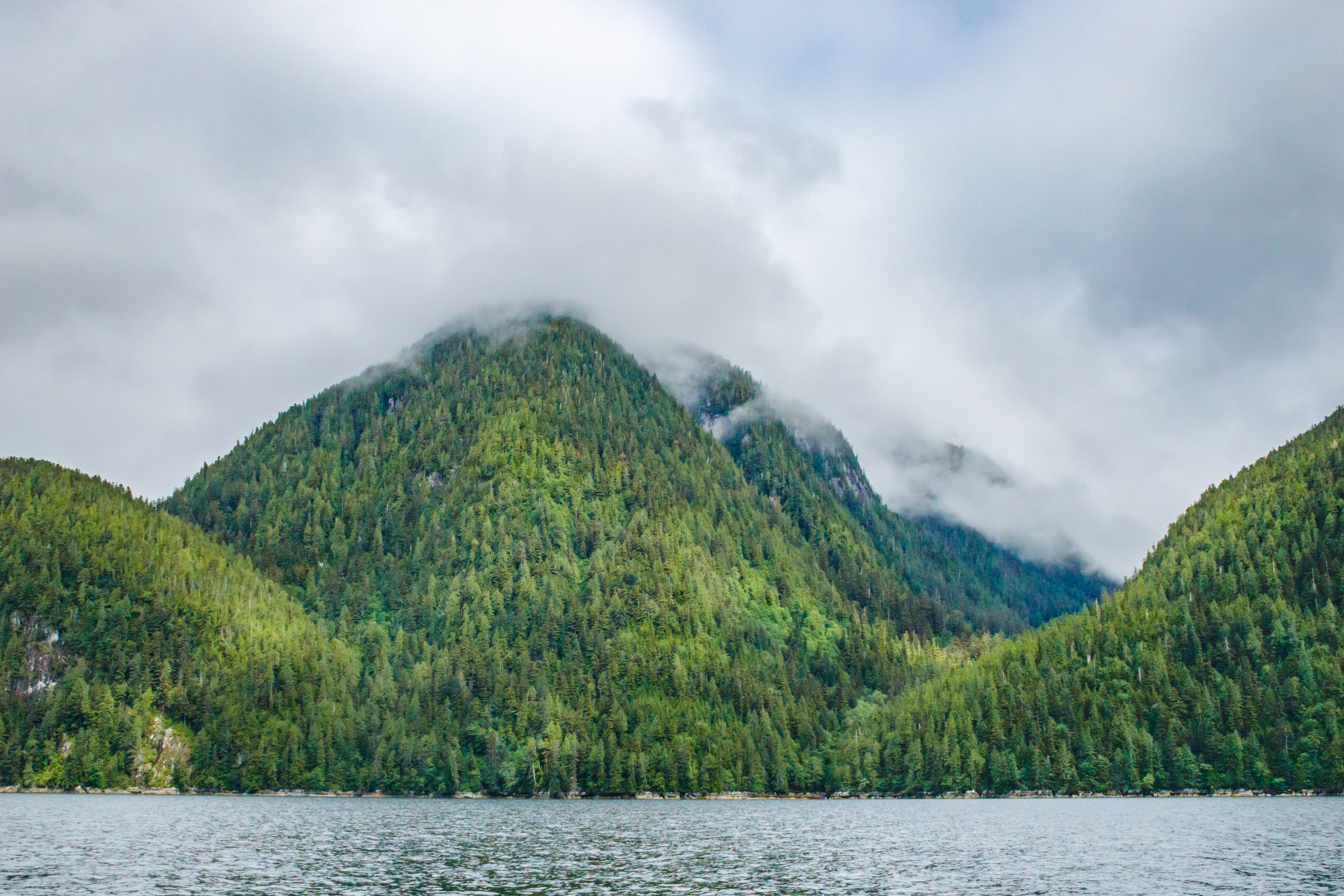
Mountains along the north side of Pooley Island

Pooley Island is an island in the North Coast region of British Columbia, Canada. To its west and southwest is Roderick Island, to its east Mathieson Channel. James Johnstone, one of George Vancouver's lieutenants during his 1791-95 expedition, first charted its north and east coasts in 1793. The island was later named after Charles Edward Pooley.

Pooley Island holds cultural and fisheries values for the Kitasoo/Xai'Xais First Nation. The Pooley Conservancy, comprising over 3000 hectares on the northeast part of the island, was created in 2006 and is co-managed by BC Parks and the Kitasoo/Xai'Xais First Nation. The Conservancy includes James Bay and Windy Bay, both of which have long been used by boaters as anchorages.
