= Bella Bella and Gale Passage dike swarms =

Large geological structures in Canada

The extent of the Anahim Volcanic Belt, including the Bella Bella and Gale Passage dike swarms

The Bella Bella and Gale Passage dike swarms are two parallel dike swarms on the Central Coast of British Columbia, Canada. They range in age from 14.5 to 12.5 million years old. They are both chemically bimodal, consisting of rocks such as basalt, trachyte and comendite. They form the westernmost extent of the Anahim Volcanic Belt on Athlone Island, Dufferin Island and Denny Island.

The Bella Bella and Gale Passage dike swarms are petrographically similar to the shield complexes in the central Anahim Volcanic Belt. As a result, the swarms are thought to represent the roots of a peralkaline magma system in which they are the magma conduits connecting the underlying magma chamber to the volcanic centre at the surface, which has been extensively eroded to remnants of eruptive breccia.
