= John Work (fur trader) =

Canadian politician

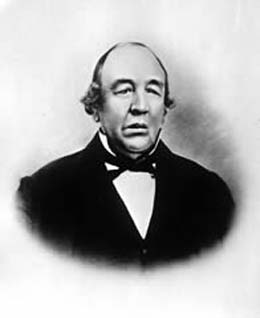
- Fur trader and Pacific Northwest explorer
- Born: John Wark; ~1792; Taughboyne parish, St Johnstown, County Donegal, Ireland
- Died: 22 December 1861 (aged 68–69); Victoria, British Columbia, Canada
- Occupation: Fur trader
- Employer: Hudson's Bay Company
- Known for: Exploring the Oregon Country
- Title: Chief Factor
- Board member of: Legislative Council of Vancouver Island
- Spouse: Josette Legacé
- Children: 11

John Work (c. 1792 – 22 December 1861) was a Chief Factor of the Hudson's Bay Company and head of one of the original founding families in Victoria, British Columbia. Work joined the Hudson's Bay Company in 1814 and served in many capacities until his death in 1861, ultimately becoming a member of the company's Board of Management for its Western Department. He also served on Vancouver Island's Legislative Council. At the time of his death, Work was the largest private land owner of Vancouver Island. Work left an important legacy in the form of sixteen journals which chronicle his trading expeditions from 1823 to 1851. His journals provide a detailed record of Pacific Northwest land features, native peoples, and the Hudson's Bay Company's fur trading business in the early 19th century.

== Early life ==
John Work was born in Taughboyne parish, St Johnstown in County Donegal, Ireland, probably in 1792. He was the eldest of six children of Henry Wark. He anglicized his name to "Work" when he joined the Hudson's Bay Company. There is no record of his schooling, but in later life his poor writing was taken as a sign of a deficient education. Work joined the Hudson's Bay Company on 15 June 1814 at Stromness in the Orkney Islands. This began his lifelong association with that company.

== Career ==
Work began his work in North America at two posts on Hudson Bay. He was first assigned as a steward at York Factory in 1814 and 1815. He was then moved to a junior trader position at Severn House, where he became district master in 1818. After the Hudson's Bay Company merged with North West Company in 1821, Work was retained as a senior clerk and was put in charge of the Island Lake District, a position he held until 1823.

In 1823, Work was reassigned to the Columbia District. He traveled west in a party led by Peter Skene Ogden. On this trip, Work began keeping a travel journal. It is a detailed record of his journey to the Columbia River via the Athabasca River and Athabasca Pass. His party reached a site known as Boat Encampment on the Columbia on 13 October, and proceeding down the river with the Hudson's Bay Company trading brigade that had been sent to meet them. The party reached the Spokane River on 21 October. At that point, Ogden and Work traveled overland to their winter quarters at Spokane House in what is now eastern Washington state.

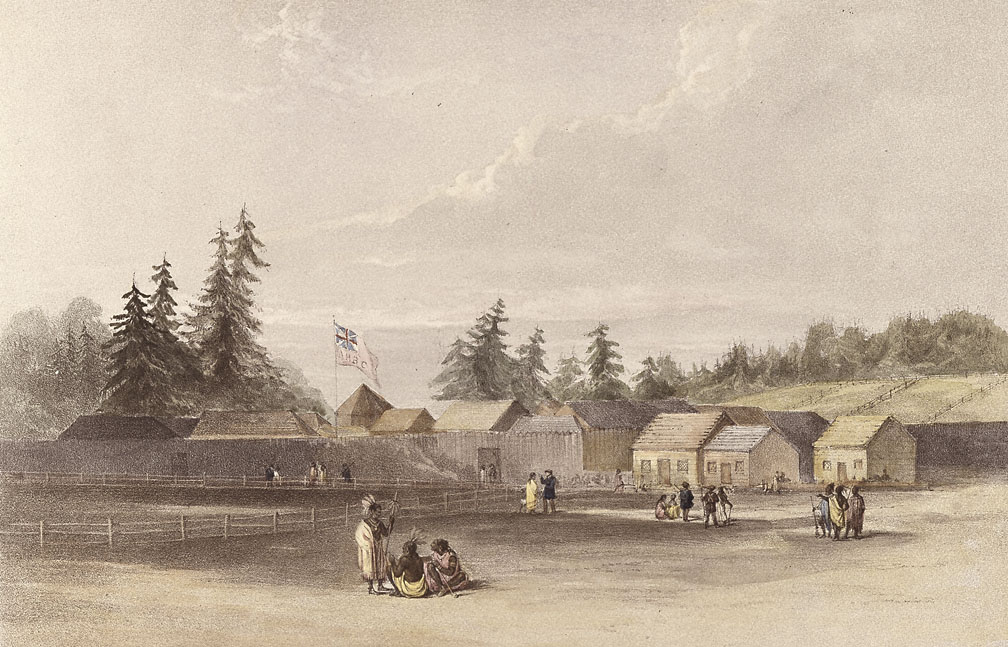
Fort Vancouver in 1845

During the 1824 trapping season, Work helped Finan McDonald extend the company's fur trade into the Flathead country of Montana. In the fall of 1824, Work accompanied Governor George Simpson and Chief Factor John McLoughlin down the Columbia River to the company's headquarters at Fort George (now Astoria, Oregon). In November 1824, Work joined an expedition led by Chief Trader James McMillan that explored the lower Fraser River looking for a site to establish a major trading post. On the return trip, his party discovered the Cowlitz Portage, which became an important route between the Columbia River and Puget Sound. In the spring of 1825, Work helped move the company's headquarters from Fort George to the newly established Fort Vancouver on the north bank of the Columbia facing the mouth of the Willamette River.

Later that year, Work was put in charge of Spokane House. Work spent the 1825–26 trapping season trading furs in western Montana where he reopened Flathead House. However, his most important job was to establish a new post on the Columbia near Kettle Falls to be named Fort Colvile. After completing Fort Colvile, Work closed Spokane House in April 1826. Work ran his trading operations from Fort Colvile until the summer of 1829, often making short trading expeditions into British Columbia or accompanying fur cargo to Fort Vancouver.

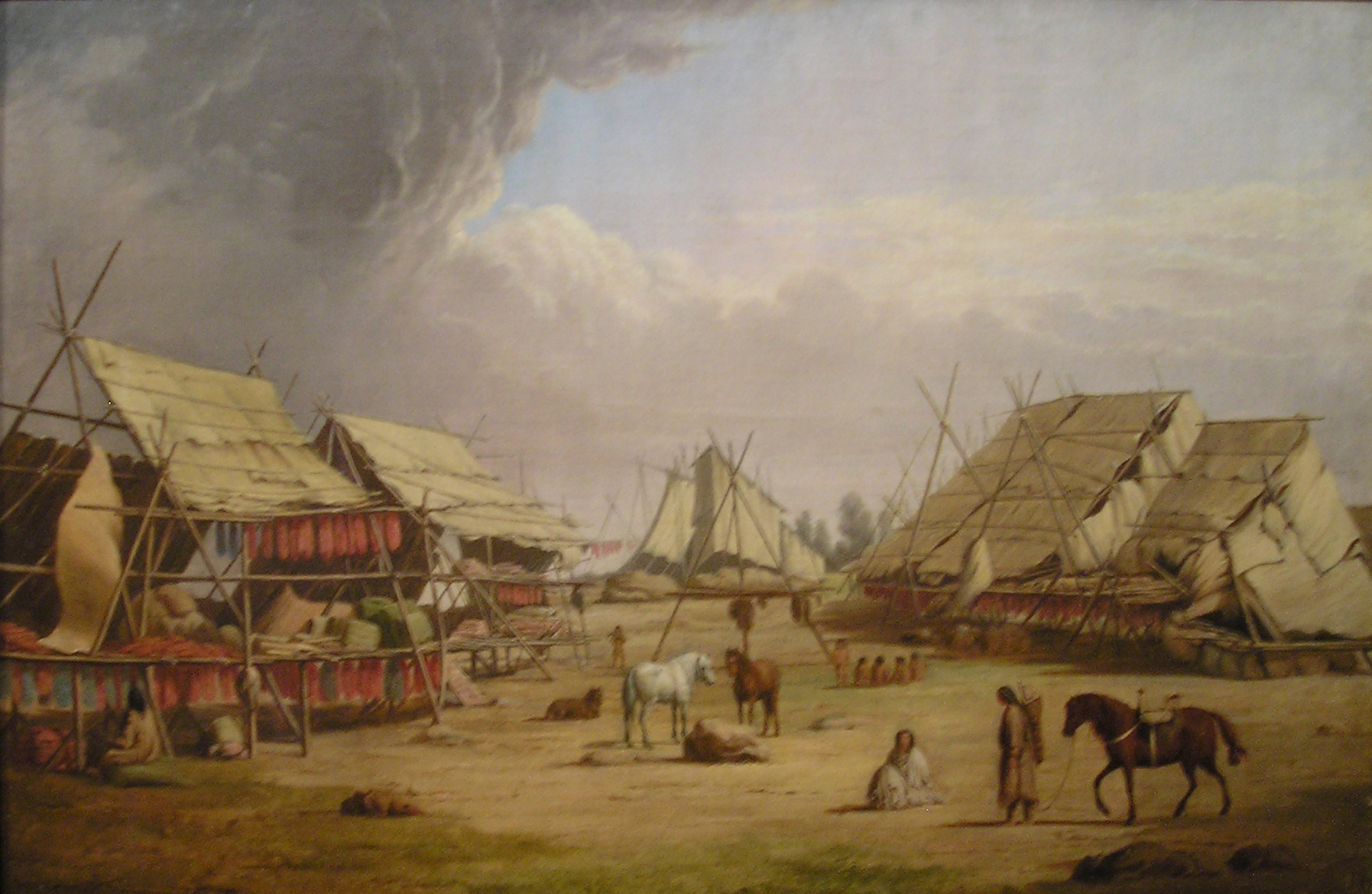
Indian camp at Fort Colvile painted by Paul Kane

In 1830 Work was promoted to the rank of Chief Trader, and John McLoughlin put Work in charge of the Snake country trading brigade which had previously been run by Peter Skene Ogden. During the next year, Work travelled over 2,000 miles across Oregon into what is now eastern Idaho, western Montana, northwestern Utah, and along the Humboldt River in Nevada. His expeditions were profitable, but Ogden had already explored and heavily trapped these areas. Because of this, Work recommended the annual Snake country expeditions be stopped. The next year, Work was sent into the Salmon River country of Idaho and Montana's Flathead country. The rugged terrain, hostile Blackfeet Indians, and competition from the American trappers made these expeditions difficult. Work was promoted Chief Trader at the end of the 1831 season.

In 1832, the Hudson's Bay Company sent Work to the Sacramento Valley in Mexican California. Trapping in the valley was very poor. Two previous Hudson's Bay Company trapping expedition led by Ogden and Alexander Roderick McLeod had already been through the valley 1829 and 1830. There was also another Hudson's Bay Company brigade led by Michel Laframboise and an American trapping party along with Work's brigade trapping in the same area during the 1832 season. Hostile Indians forced Work and Laframboise to join forces. Their party explored the coast from San Francisco to Cape Mendocino. Work returned to Fort Vancouver in October 1833.

In 1834, Work was posted to Fort Simpson and put in charge of the company's trade along the British Columbia coast. He supervised the construction of the fort, which was being relocated from the Nass River to McLoughlin Bay. During a trading expedition in 1840, Work fell out of a tree, tearing open his abdomen and exposing his intestines. After pushing his intestines back into his body, he spent several days near death before continuing his journey.

In 1841, Governor Simpson decided to close all the coastal posts except Fort Simpson and Fort Stikine. His plan was to use the company's ship Beaver for most of the coastal trade. In 1842, John McLoughlin's son was in charge of Fort Stikine. Work felt he needed more help so he arranged for the junior clerk at Fort Stikine to be transferred to Fort Simpson. This left the young McLoughlin without any company support at his post. A few months later, McLoughlin was murdered and his powerful father blamed Work for transferring his son's only assistant away from Fort Stikine. In addition, it took over a year for Work to capture and send the three men involved in the murder south to Fort Vancouver. Work's relations with McLoughlin never recovered. Fortunately for Work, McLoughlin resigned from the company in 1846. A month later, Work was promoted to the rank of Chief Factor.

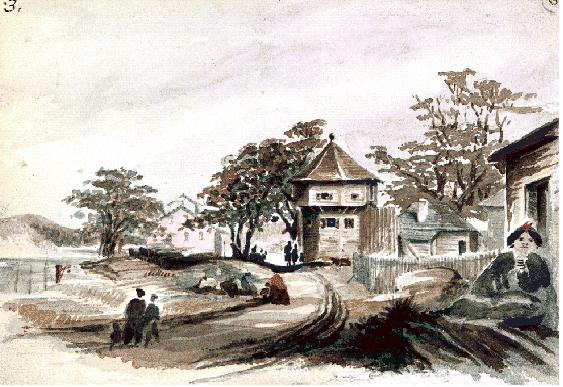
Fort Victoria painted by Sarah Crease in 1860

In 1845, the Hudson's Bay Company decided to put the Columbia Department in the hands of three Chief Factors. In 1846, Work, Ogden, and James Douglas were selected to run of department. Work was placed in charge of the coastal trade including Forts Simpson, Fort Stikine, Fort Langley, and the Beaver. Work's new job required extensive travel up and down the coast. In 1849, Work decided to abandon Fort Stikine and establish Fort Rupert to exploit coal deposits on the northern part of Vancouver Island. When the miners went on strike in 1850, Work went by canoe from Fort Simpson to Fort Victoria to consult with Douglas. He then went by canoe to Fort Rupert and successfully persuaded the miners to go back to work. In 1849, Work settled his large family at Fort Victoria where his children could get an education. However, Fort Simpson remained his headquarters until 1851.

In 1852, Work purchased 823 acres of farmland north of the Fort Victoria and built a fine home there. A year later, Governor James Douglas appointed Work to the Legislative Council of Vancouver Island. Work supported Douglas in the controversy surrounding the appointment of David Cameron as chief justice of Vancouver Island. He opposed the establishment of an assembly for the colony because there were "so few people to govern" and "nobody to pay taxes to cover expenses." Work also continued his duties as Chief Factor of the Hudson's Bay Company, acting as a trustee for its Fur Trade Branch which purchased land for settlers who could not afford the required minimum 20-acre lots at £1 per acre. For two month in 1861, Work was acting governor while Douglas was away on business. Work remained both a Chief Factor for the Hudson's Bay Company and a member of the Legislative Council until his death in December 1861.

== Family ==
In 1825, Governor Simpson suggested that Work marry the daughter of a Cayuse Indian chief, to secure good relations with the Native Americans living in along the Columbia River. Work did not follow the governor's advice. Instead, he married Josette Legace, a mixed-blood woman from the Spokane tribe in 1826.

Work's wife accompanied him on many of his trading expeditions. In addition, she and their younger children lived with him at Fort Simpson from 1836 until 1849, while their older children attended school at Fort Vancouver and then at the Methodist mission school on the Willamette River near what is now Salem, Oregon. After finishing their schooling in 1841, the older girls joined the family at Fort Simpson.

In 1849, Work moved his family to Fort Victoria so the younger children could get an education. Work settled his family on an 823-acre farm north of the fort and built a large home there, which he called Hillside. By 1859, he owned over 1,800 acres, making him the largest private landowner on Vancouver Island.

Because of his remote assignments and constant travel, Work and his wife were unable to have a formal wedding until 1849. The couple was finally married in a church ceremony on 6 November 1849 at Fort Victoria.

Work was the father of eleven children, three boys and eight girls.

- Jane, born at Fort Colvile in 1827, married William Fraser Tolmie in 1850
- Sarah, born at Fort Colvile in 1829, married Roderick Finlayson in 1849
- Leticia, born in Idaho in 1831, married Edward Huggins in 1857
- Margaret, born at Fort Vancouver in 1836, married E. Jackson in 1861
- Mary, born at Fort Simpson in 1837, married James Allan Grahame in 1860
- John, born at Fort Simpson in 1839
- Catherine, born at Fort Simpson between 1840 and 1842, married C. Wallace in 1861
- Suzette, born at Fort Victoria in 1843, married Edward Gawler Prior in 1878
- Henry, born at Fort Simpson in 1844 or 1845 (died in an accident at a young age)
- David, born at Fort Simpson in 1846
- Cecilia, born at Fort Simpson in 1849, married C. Jones in 1870

Several of Work's sons-in-law were also well known Hudson's Bay Company employees, including Doctor William Fraser Tolmie, Roderick Finlayson, Edward Huggins, and James Allan Grahame.

== Legacy ==
Work chronicled his trading expeditions in sixteen meticulously kept journals, covering the period from July 1823 to October 1835 plus one additional trip in 1851. Although his journals are written as matter-of-fact business correspondence, they provide a detailed record of the Oregon Country in the early 19th century. His journals have survived intact, making them among the oldest first-hand accounts of land features, native peoples, and the Hudson's Bay Company fur trading operations in the Pacific Northwest. As such, they are important historical records.

In addition, there are many geographical features in the Pacific Northwest named in honor of John Work. Mount Work, in the Gowlland Range flanking the east shore of Saanich Inlet and just northwest of Victoria, is named for him, Most of the range is in Mount Work Regional Park. Also named for him is Work Point at the west end of the peninsula. Other locations named for him include Work Channel, on the northeast side of the Tsimpsean Peninsula, just northeast of Prince Rupert and near Fort Simpson, where he had served as Chief Factor; Work Bay in Finlayson Channel; and Work Island near Butedale.
