= Price Island =

Island in British Columbia, Canada

Coordinates: 52°24′N 128°42′W

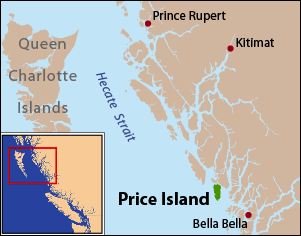
Price Island is located on the southeastern side of Hecate Strait. Southeast of Price Island is Milbanke Sound, and Laredo Sound is to the northwest.

Price Island is an island on the coast of the Canadian province of British Columbia. It is located at the southeastern end of Hecate Strait and the northeastern end of Queen Charlotte Sound. The southernmost point of Price Island, called Day Point, is used to delineate the boundary between Hecate Strait and Queen Charlotte Sound. Milbanke Sound is just to the south of Price Island. Laredo Sound is just north. Swindle Island lies just north of Price Island. The main Inside Passage route crosses Milbanke Sound and enters Finlayson Channel just east of Price Island. Price Island is located within the Kitimat-Stikine Regional District.

Price Island is 23 kilometres (14 mi) long and 10 kilometres (6.2 mi) wide. It is 122 square kilometres (47 sq mi) in area.

Price Island was named in 1866 by Captain Daniel Pender of the Royal Navy, after Captain John Adolphus Pope Price, also of the Royal Navy.

Price Island is part of a volcanic centre called the Milbanke Sound Group which includes several monogenetic cinder cones. Holocene basaltic lava flows from Price Island overlie adjacent beach deposits.

== See also ==
- List of volcanoes in Canada
