= Finngal Island =

Island in British Columbia, Canada

Coordinates: 52.079°N 128.447°W

Finngal Island is a small island on the central coast of British Columbia, Canada, south of Dufferin Island. Composed of columnar basalt lava flows, it is part of a volcanic group called the Milbanke Sound Group.

== See also ==
- Volcanism of Canada
- Volcanism of Western Canada
- List of volcanoes in Canada
