= Milbanke Sound Group =

- Milbanke Sound Cones
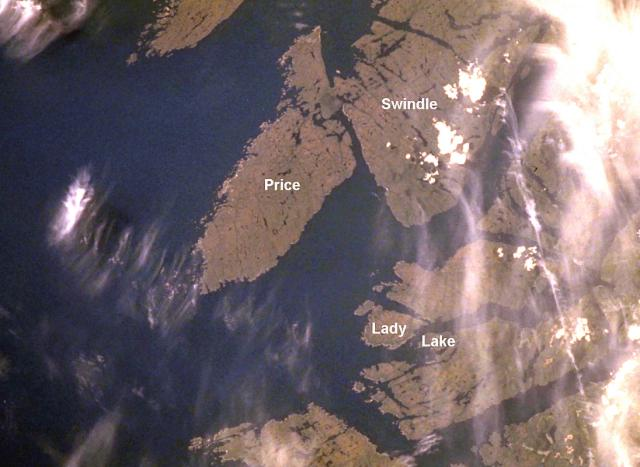
- Aerial photo of the Milbanke Sound Group

Highest point
- Peak: Helmet Peak
- Elevation: 335 m (1,099 ft)
- Coordinates: 52°21′17″N 128°21′01″W

Geography
- Country: Canada
- Province: British Columbia
- District: Range 3 Coast Land District
- Parent range: Kitimat Ranges

Geology
- Rock age(s): Formation: In the past 10,000 years (Holocene); Last eruption: Unknown; Last activity: Unknown
- Rock type(s): Cinder cones, lava flows

The Milbanke Sound Group, also called the Milbanke Sound Cones, is an enigmatic group of five small basaltic volcanoes in the Kitimat Ranges of the Coast Mountains in British Columbia, Canada. Named for Milbanke Sound, this volcanic group straddles on at least four small islands (three of which are uninhabited), including Swindle, Price, Lady Douglas and Lake Island. Not much is known about this group of volcanoes and they remain undated. However, they all likely formed in the past 10,000 years after the last glacial period as evidenced by a small amount of erosion. The age of the most recent volcanic activity is also unknown. Most of the Milbanke Sound Cones are covered by mature forest. Kitasu Hill and Helmet Peak are the only two cones that are officially named.

This group of volcanoes is unlike many other volcanic groups in Canada as it resides on islands instead of on the mainland. The volcanoes form a northwest–southeast trend along the British Columbia Coast. To the west the Milbanke Sound Group is bounded by the Pacific Ocean and elsewhere it is surrounded by adjacent islands that form an archipelago. Although not related, the Milbanke Sound Group is close to the remains of a much older magmatic feature that was formed during the Tertiary period.

== Geology ==
=== Volcanoes ===
Just south of Kitasu Bay on the southwestern shore of Swindle Island, Kitasu Hill rises with an elevation of 250 m (820 ft) and a topographic prominence of 230 m (750 ft). This is a small symmetrical monogenetic cinder cone and the best preserved volcano associated with the Milbanke Sound Group. It is the northernmost and most prominent volcano of the Milbanke Sound Cones with a circular volcanic crater at its summit. The volcano produced basaltic lava flows that extend to the north. Subaerial tephra and volcanic bombs are the main volcanics comprising the volcano. These volcanics surround eroded remains of the basalt lava flows and are composed of the mineral olivine. Kitasu Hill rests on till that overlies glacially scoured bedrock.

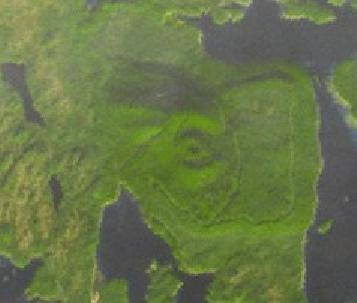
Satellite image of Kitasu Hill and its circular volcanic crater

Near the northeastern shore of Price Island, a small eroded monogenetic cinder cone composed of basalt is covered by mature forest. It has an elevation of 40 m (130 ft) and is the source of a basaltic lava flow. This lava flow extends down to the northeastern shoreline of Price Island where it covers beach gravel.

Helmet Peak on the northern end of Lake Island just off the southwestern side of the Don Peninsula is a steep-sided monogenetic cinder cone. It is composed of welded volcanic blocks and basaltic feeder dikes. With an elevation of 335 m (1,099 ft), Helmet Peak is the highest volcano in the Milbanke Sound Group. During its eruption, basaltic tuff breccia was sent throughout the surrounding landscape that deposited on glaciated granitic rock and unconsolidated beach gravel near the volcano. This basaltic tuff breccia covers parts of Lake Island and nearby Lady Douglas Island. Blocks of basement granodiorite, some up to 2 m (6.6 ft) wide, are randomly suspended within the breccia. Basalt on Lake Island is characterized by abundant 0.5 to 1 cm (0.20 to 0.39 in) labradorite and clinopyroxene phenocrysts.

At the southern end of the Milbanke Sound Group, a small monogenetic cinder cone with an elevation of 50 m (160 ft) resides on Dufferin Island. It sent basaltic lava flows to the north where they reached the island's shoreline to cover beach gravel. Since its formation, the cinder cone has been eroded and covered by forest. Finngal Island, south of Dufferin Island, contains one or more basaltic lava flows that form well-preserved columnar jointing. Like other volcanic deposits in the Milbanke Sound Group, little is known about these lava flows.

=== Origins ===
The relationship of the Milbanke Sound Cones and to other volcanoes throughout British Columbia is not clear. In some classifications, they are grouped with the Anahim Volcanic Belt because they are parallel with its east–west trend. However, this grouping is not widely accepted because the volcanoes are much younger than other magmatic features at the western end of the Anahim Volcanic Belt. The cause of this significant age change is because the Anahim Volcanic Belt has its origins from the North American Plate moving over the hypothesized Anahim hotspot. This is a mantle plume that is likely responsible for volcanism throughout the Anahim Volcanic Belt. Individual Anahim volcanoes generally become older west of Nazko Cone, indicating that the North American Plate is moving in a westerly direction with respect to the hotspot, carrying the volcanoes along with it at a rate of 2 to 3.3 cm (0.79 to 1.30 in) per year. Thus the hotspot model can not be used to explain the formation of the Milbanke Sound Group. However, the volcanic group is near the remnants of a 14 to 12 million year old magmatic feature that is interpreted to define the westernmost end of the Anahim hotspot track.

A possible explanation for the origin of the Milbanke Sound Group is that it reflects a northern extension of the north-west trending subduction-related Garibaldi Volcanic Belt further south. This in turn is a segment of the Cascade Volcanic Arc in the United States, which includes Mount Baker and Mount St. Helens. However, there is currently not enough data to support this suggestion. Its origins might also result from other tectonic processes that are currently not understood.

== Monitoring ==
Currently, the Milbanke Sound Cones are not monitored closely enough by the Geological Survey of Canada to ascertain how active their magma chambers are. An existing network of seismographs has been established to monitor earthquakes, but is too far away to provide a good indication of what is happening beneath the cones. It may sense an increase in activity if a volcano becomes very restless, but this may only provide a warning for a large eruption. It might detect activity only once a volcano has started erupting.

The Interagency Volcanic Event Notification Plan, Canada's volcanic emergency notification program, was established to outline the notification procedure of some of the main agencies that would be involved in response to a volcanic eruption in Canada, an eruption close to Canada's borders, or an eruption significant enough to have an effect on Canada and its people. It focuses primarily on aviation safety because jet aircraft can quickly enter areas of volcanic ash. The program notifies all impacted agencies that have to deal with volcanic events. Aircraft are rerouted away from hazardous ash and people on the ground are notified of potential ash fall.

== See also ==
- List of volcanoes in Canada
- Volcanology of Canada
- Volcanology of Eastern Canada
- Volcanology of Northern Canada
- Volcanology of Western Canada
