= Koeye River =

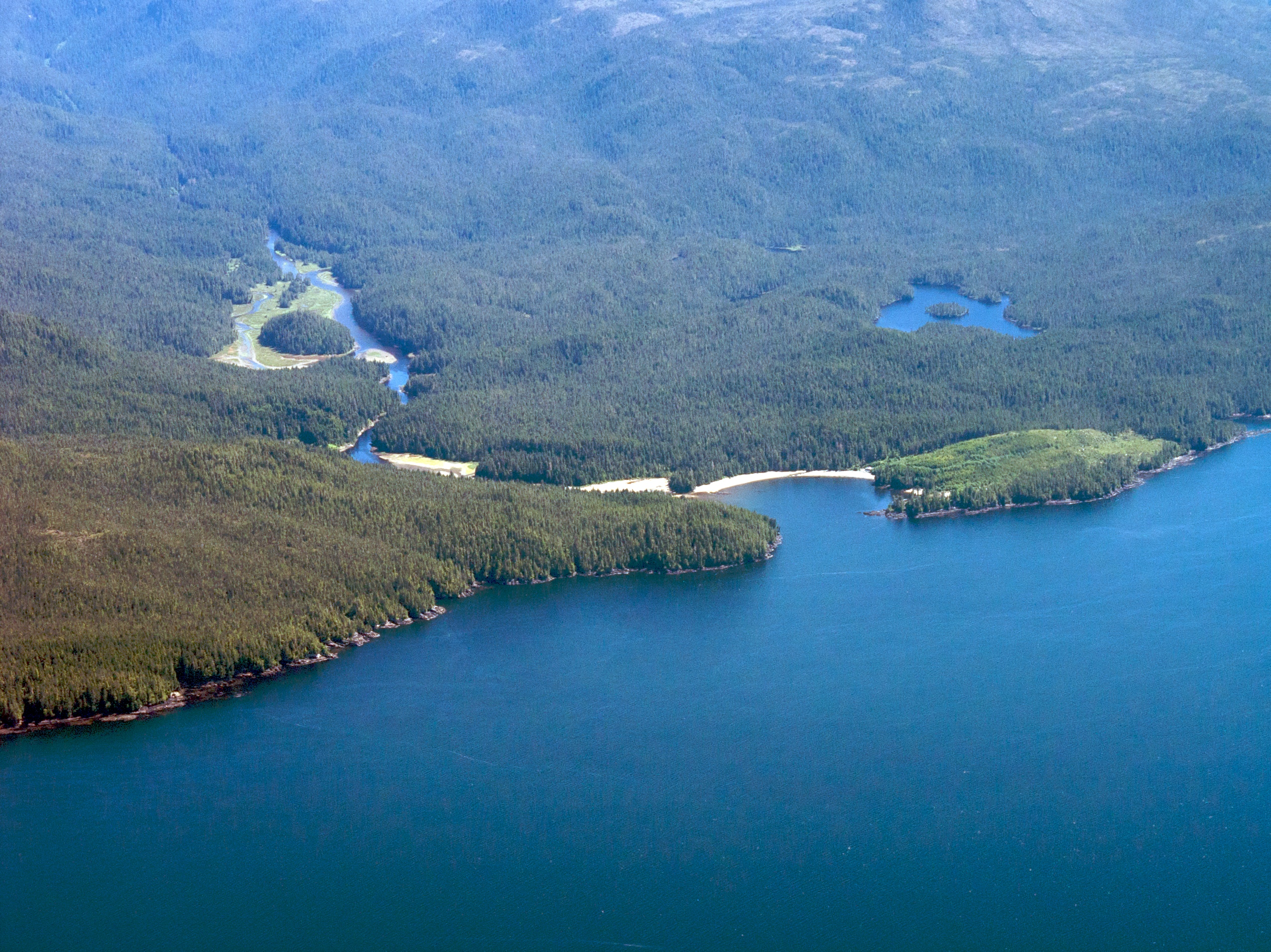
- Mouth of the Koeye River

- Mouth of Koeye River
- Etymology: Heiltsuk word, possibly meaning "sitting on the water"

Location
- Country: Canada
- Province: British Columbia
- District: Range 2 Coast Land District

Physical characteristics
- Source: Pacific Ranges
  - location: Coast Mountains, British Columbia
  - coordinates: 51°47′4″N 127°31′23″W
  - elevation: 943 m (3,094 ft)
- Mouth: Pacific Ocean
  - location: Fitz Hugh Sound, British Columbia
  - coordinates: 51°46′34″N 127°52′34″W
  - elevation: 0 m (0 ft)
- Length: 35 km (22 mi)
- Basin size: 180 km^{2} (69 sq mi)

Koeye River (pronounced Kway) is a river in the Canadian province of British Columbia. It originates in the Pacific Ranges of the Coast Mountains, and flows about 35 km (22 mi) west to Fitz Hugh Sound, south of Bella Bella. The river's watershed is about 18,000 ha (180 km^{2}; 69 mi^{2}).

The Koeye River is located on the Central Coast of British Columbia, in the Great Bear Rainforest. It empties into Fitz Hugh Sound, part of the Inside Passage. The river is within the traditional territory of the Heiltsuk, Wuikinuxv, and Nuxalk, today the Heiltsuk Nation, Wuikinuxv Nation, and Nuxalk Nation.

The Koeye River's name comes from a Heiltsuk word, possibly meaning "sitting on the water", the ̓Wuikinuxv called it Kvii and the Heiltsuk K̓vaí.

== Course ==
The Koeye River originates in the Pacific Ranges of the Coast Mountains, between Rivers Inlet and Burke Channel. It flows generally west through Koeye Lake and Little Koeye Lake, then north of the Koeye Range to empty into Fitz Hugh Sound at Koeye Point.

== Natural history ==
The Koeye River supports Chinook, Chum, Coho, Pink, and Sockeye salmon, as well as Steelhead and Cutthroat trout. Terrestrial wildlife of the Koeye watershed includes grizzly bear, American black bear, wolf, deer, cougar, mountain goat, wolverine, and North American river otter. The river's estuary is used by many waterfowl, including rare and endangered species such as the western grebe, trumpeter swan, and marbled murrelet.

== Protection ==
The Koeye River's watershed land is protected by the Koeye Conservancy, which is co-managed by the Wuikinuxv Nation and the Province of British Columbia.

The river's estuary, along with the nearby Namu River at Namu, is one of the largest complexes of ancient forests of British Columbia's Central Coast. The area is listed as a Protected Area under the Great Bear Rainforest agreement.

== See also ==
- List of rivers of British Columbia
