= Susan Island =

Island in Canada

Coordinates: 52°30′00″N 128°21′00″W

Susan Island is an island in the North Coast of British Columbia, Canada. To its west is Finlayson Channel; to its east Mathieson Channel. Roderick Island lies to its north and Dowager Island to its south. James Johnstone, one of George Vancouver's lieutenants during his 1791-95 expedition, first charted its west and east coasts in 1793.
