= Helmet Peak (British Columbia) =

Mountain in British Columbia, Canada

- Location within British Columbia

Highest point
- Elevation: 318 m (1,043 ft)
- Prominence: 318 m (1,043 ft)
- Listing: Volcanoes of Canada; Mountains of British Columbia
- Coordinates: 52°21′16″N 128°21′01″W

Geography
- Country: Canada
- Province: British Columbia
- Parent range: Kitimat Ranges
- Topo map: NTS 103A8 Spiller Channel

Geology
- Rock age: Holocene
- Mountain type: Monogenetic cinder cone
- Volcanic field: Milbanke Sound Group
- Last eruption: Unknown

Helmet Peak is a monogenetic cinder cone of the Milbanke Sound Group in British Columbia, Canada. The basaltic tuff breccias on Lake Island and Lady Douglas Island originated from Helmet Peak on Lady Island.

== See also ==
- Northern Cordilleran Volcanic Province
- Volcanology of Canada
- Volcanology of Western Canada
