= Quottoon Inlet =

Inlet in British Columbia, Canada

Coordinates: 54°28′N 130°04′W

Quottoon Inlet is an inlet in the North Coast region of the Canadian province of British Columbia. It extends northeast from Work Channel. It was first charted in 1793 by James Johnstone and Robert Barrie, two of George Vancouver’s officers during his 1791–95 expedition.
