= Great Bear Rainforest =

Coastal temperate rainforest in British Columbia, Canada

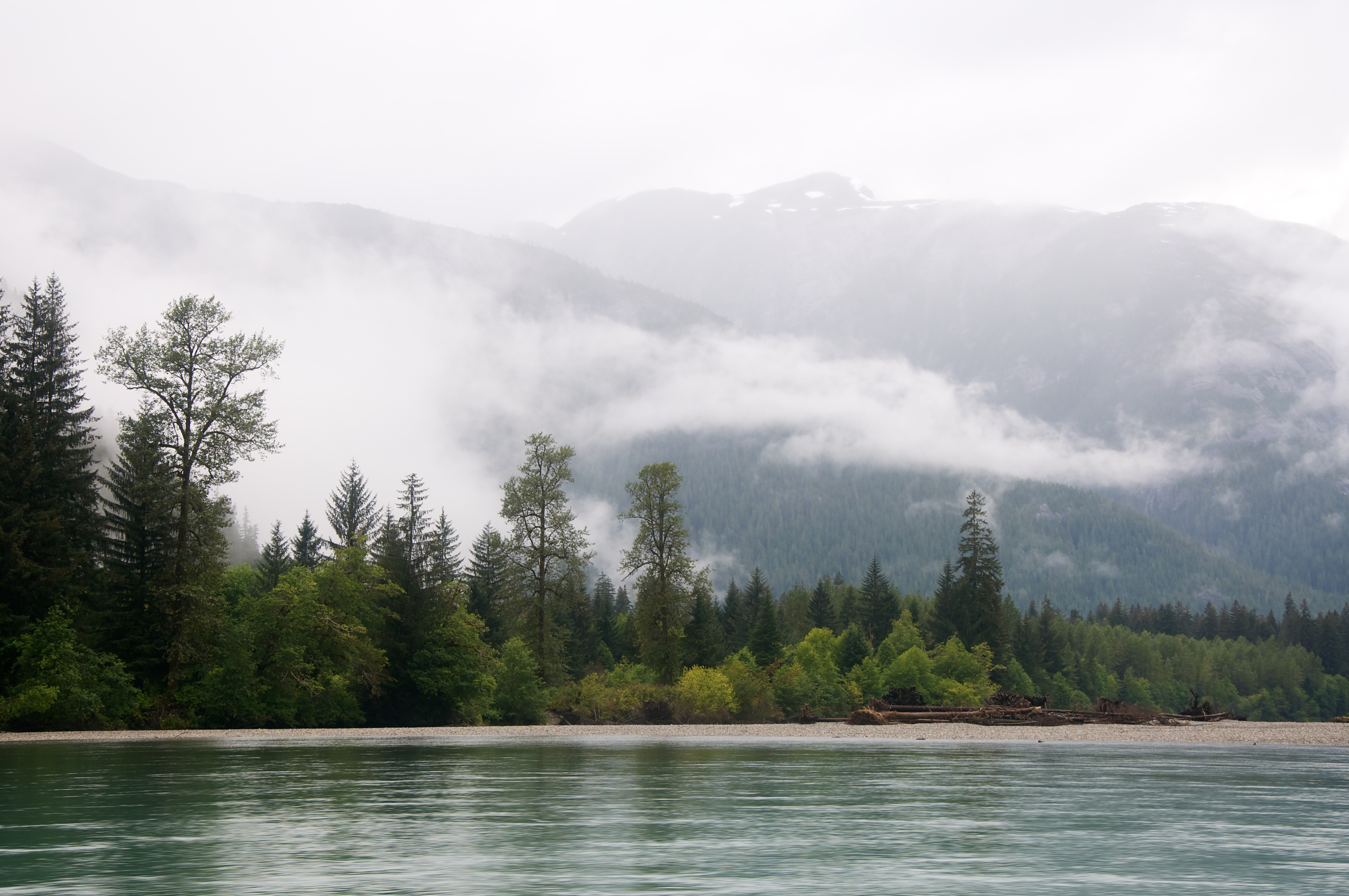
- Lowland forests of Kitlope Heritage Conservancy

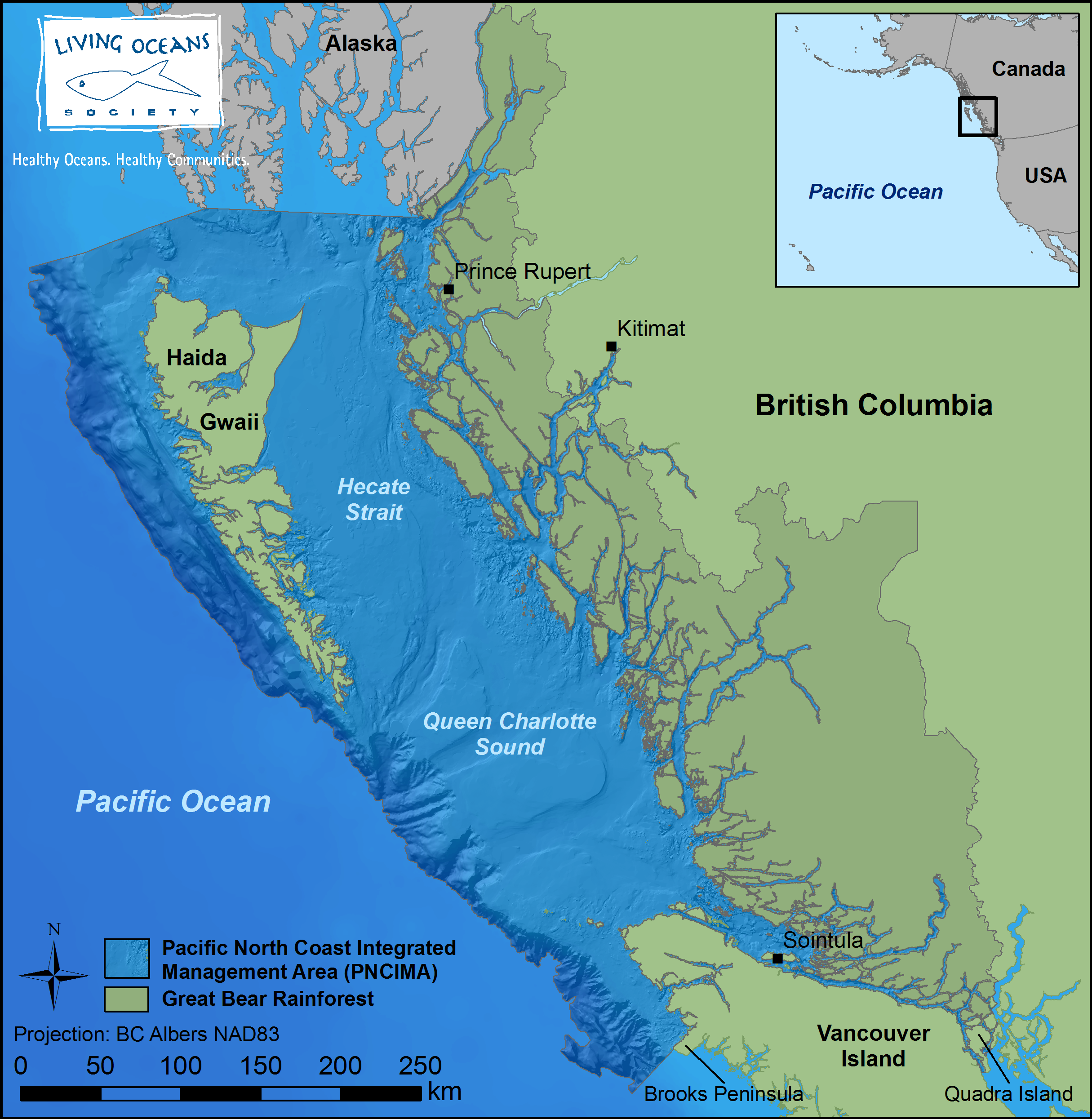
- Map of the Great Bear Rainforest

Geography
- Location: British Columbia, Canada
- Coordinates: 53°0′0″N 128°0′0″W
- Area: 64,000 km^{2} (25,000 mi^{2})

Administration
- Established: 19 May 2016

Ecology
- Ecosystem: British Columbia mainland coastal forests

The Great Bear Rainforest is a temperate rain forest on the Pacific coast of British Columbia, comprising 6.4 million hectares. It is part of the larger Pacific temperate rainforest ecoregion, which is the largest coastal temperate rainforest in the world.

The Great Bear Rainforest was officially recognized by the Government of British Columbia in February 2016, when it announced an agreement to permanently protect 85% of the old-growth forested area from industrial logging. The forest was admitted to the Queen's Commonwealth Canopy in September of the same year.

== Geography ==
The size of the Great Bear Rainforest, also called the North and Central Coast land use planning area or the Central and North Coast LRMP area, is roughly 32,000 km^{2} (12,000 sq mi). As part of the 2006 North and Central Coast Land Use Decision three new land use zones were created: Protected Areas; Biodiversity, Mining, and Tourism Areas (BMTAs); and Ecosystem-based Management Operating Areas (EBMs). As of 2009, approximately 16,000 km^{2} (6,200 sq mi) of the region has been designated as protected areas (in a form called conservancies), and 3,000 km^{2} (1,200 sq mi) as BMTAs. Commercial timber harvesting and commercial hydro-electric power projects are prohibited within BMTAs.

The Great Bear Rainforest extends from the Discovery Islands in the south to the BC–Alaska boundary in the north. It includes all offshore islands within this range except Vancouver Island and the archipelago of Haida Gwaii. Its northern end reaches up Portland Canal to the vicinity of Stewart. To the south it includes Prince Rupert, most of Douglas Channel, half of Hawkesbury Island, and part of Gardner Canal. Kitimat is outside the region, to the east. Farther south, the region includes all of the coast west and south of the Fiordland Conservancy, Kitlope Heritage Conservancy Protected Area, Tweedsmuir North and Tweedsmuir South Provincial Parks—which includes Dean Channel, Burke Channel, Rivers Inlet, and the communities of Bella Bella, Bella Coola, and Hagensborg. The southern end of the region includes Knight Inlet and Bute Inlet.

== Ecology ==
The Great Bear Rainforest is one of the largest remaining tracts of unspoiled temperate rainforest left in the world. The area is home to species such as cougars, wolves, salmon, grizzly bears, and the Kermode ("spirit") bear, a unique subspecies of the black bear, in which one in ten cubs displays a recessive white coloured coat.

The forest features 1,000-year-old western red cedar and 90-metre tall Sitka Spruce.

Coastal temperate rainforests are characterized by their proximity to both ocean and mountains. Abundant rainfall results when the atmospheric flow of moist air off the ocean collides with mountain ranges. Much of the Pacific coastline of North America shares this climate pattern, including portions of Alaska, British Columbia, Washington, Oregon, and Northern California.

== History ==
=== Campaign for protection ===
The temperate rainforests of the Central and North Coast of mainland BC were largely unknown to conservationists as late as the 1980s. Then in 1990 Peter McAllister, an ex-chair of the Sierra Club of Western Canada, veteran forest campaigner Carmanah Walbran Provincial Park and early advocate for boycotts against the timber industry chartered a three-masted ship, skippered by an arctic adventurer, Captain Sven Johansson. With a crew of friends aboard the North Star of Hershel Island, McAllister sailed north from Victoria that summer to launch what would become known as the Great Bear Rainforest Campaign.

It was the first of a series of exploration voyages to the Central and North Coast of British Columbia to support the First Nations of the Central and North Coast in taking back their traditional territories from the timber companies, protecting the remaining unlogged watersheds and bringing recognition to the ecological and cultural values of a significant expanse of the earth's temperate rainforest.

Organizing themselves as the Raincoast Conservation Society, they alone conducted the Great Bear Rainforest Campaign until 1996 when some of the environmental organizations involved in Clayoquot Sound on Vancouver Island turned their attention to the Great Bear.

The Society's expedition voyages took on board an international array of journalists, filmmakers, photographers, scientists and conservationists. The first order of business was to make contact with the Heiltsuk First Nation in Bella Bella, the fishing village in the heart of the Great Bear.

On the inaugural expedition they learned that MacMillan Bloedell was poised to log the Koeye River watershed (18,625 ha (46,020 acres)). Having salmon runs and a healthy grizzly population, the Koeye together with the adjacent Namu River watershed is one of the largest complexes of ancient forests of Central Coast. On returning to Victoria, McAllister presented the Koeye River Watershed Wilderness Proposal, which convinced the Social Credit government to set aside the Koeye watershed from logging in 1991.

The second exploratory expedition was aboard the sloop of Baden Cross, a founding director of their Great Bear Campaign organization, the Raincoast Conservation Society. In Bella Bella on the third expedition in 1993 was the commencement of a long-term interaction with chiefs, elders, and concerned teenagers of the Heiltsuk First Nation regarding the conservation of their traditional territory on the Central Coast.

Commencing with the third expedition in 1993, Peter's family including Ian McAllister, Karen McAllister, and Bernadette Mertens McAllister became team members.

In 1994 Ian and Karen McAllister sailed their catamaran Halibut from Ottawa through the Panama Canal to join the Raincoast expeditions. Their photography helped illuminate the Great Bear internationally. In the first five years of the campaign, thousands of kilometres of ragged coast line and fjords were sailed all the way to the Alaskan border, the full extent of the Great Bear.

Mike Humphries, a Second World War fighter pilot, flew aerial reconnaissance, enhancing the documentation of logging operations while offering a bird's eye view of the landscape of the Great Bear(“Raincoast: North Among the Fjords”).

In 1994 Ian and Karen discovered a headless and pawless grizzly bear carcass. Shooting blinds in trees above salmon spawning beds were found. The Society publicized poaching and overhunting of the threatened bear population.

Stories of these first years of the campaign were presented in slide shows in western North America and Europe while those on board spread the word in newspapers, articles, journals and magazines. Documentaries brought international condemnation and the cancellation of contracts with pulp and paper producers. In the 1994 edition of Sierra, the magazine of the Sierra Club, said “Magazine wants no part of B.C. pulp”, Excerpts from the documentary Legacy: Killing a Temperate Rainforest depicting clearcutting were picked up by CNN and PBS. Jup Weber, MP of Luxembourg, a leader of the Greens, and the European critic on logging practices, invited Peter McAllister to the European Parliament in Strasbourg to present evidence of the clearcutting of old-growth forests in coastal British Columbia, countering decades of denials by the provincial government and the timber industry.

Evolution of the name Great Bear Rainforest. First it was publicized as the Hidden Coast” and the “Raincoast.” In 1993 with the launching of their flagship organization, the Raincoast Conservation Society, expeditions became known as “Raincoast Expeditions.” That year Peter McAllister first used the “Great Bear” name in honour of the coastal grizzlies fishing the salmon rivers. “Great Bear Wilderness” made its appearance in a 1994 Raincoast Conservation Society publication. In 1996 Ian McAllister added “Rainforest” to the “Great Bear” name when the Raincoast Conservation Society met with Rainforest Action Network in San Francisco to develop their international market campaign strategy.

In 1996 Raincoast's aerial reconnaissance photography of logging operations in the Great Bear was used by Rainforest Action Network in San Francisco to begin developing an international marketing campaign. Home building suppliers inspired by the evidence threatened logging companies operating in Heiltsuk territory with boycotts. This helped force the provincial government and the timber industry to come to the table for the beginning of negotiations involving the protection of the Great Bear Rainforest.

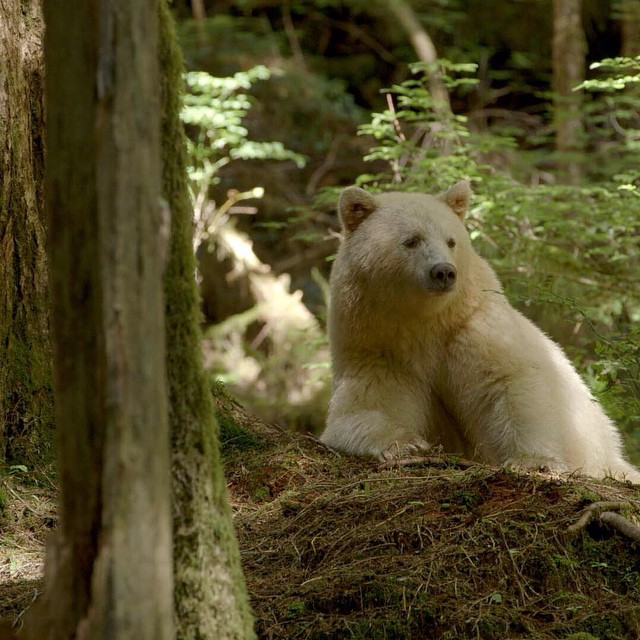
A Kermode bear from the Great Bear Rainforest.

In May 2004, the stakeholders agreed to recommend the BC government that about 14,000 square kilometres (3,500,000 acres), about 33% of the Great Bear Rainforest, be put under some form of protection, and that new forms of ecosystem-based forestry be required throughout the rainforest. This fell short of the activists' recommendations, which had concluded that 44%–70% should be protected. The recommendation given to the BC government was a compromise agreed to by the stakeholders after negotiations. The stakeholders included provincial and local governments; many BC First Nations such as the Heiltsuk and Homalco; the ENGOs Greenpeace, ForestEthics, Rainforest Action Network, Pacific Wild, and Sierra Club BC and forestry corporations such as Canadian Forest Products, Catalyst Paper Corporation, International Forest Products, Western Forest Products; and many others.

On 7 February 2006 a comprehensive protection package was announced for the Great Bear Rainforest, which was defined to include the central and north coasts of BC and Haida Gwaii. The Great Bear Rainforest Agreement included four key elements: rainforest protection, improved logging practices, the involvement of First Nations in decision making, and conservation financing to enable economic diversification. The final agreement banned logging in 33% of the Great Bear Rainforest and implemented ecosystem-based forestry management for the entire Great Bear Rainforest by 2009.

The 2006 agreement between the BC government and a coalition of conservationists, loggers, hunters, and First Nations established a series of conservancies stretching 400 kilometres (250 mi) along the coast. The protected areas contain 18,000 square kilometres (6,900 sq mi), and another 46,900 square kilometres (18,100 sq mi) that is run under a management plan that ensures sustainable forest management.

The Canadian government announced on 21 January 2007 that it would spend $30 million for protection of this rainforest. This matched a pledge made previously by the British Columbia government, as well as private donations of $60 million, making the total funding for the new reserve $120 million.

In autumn 2008, Greenpeace, Sierra Club BC and ForestEthics (jointly known as Rainforest Solutions Project) launched an online campaign titled, "Keep the Promise," to put pressure on Gordon Campbell, then Premier of British Columbia, to honour the Great Bear Rainforest agreement. The groups were concerned certain aspects of the agreement, including implementation of ecosystem-based management, would not materialize in time for the government's own final implementation deadline of March 31, 2009.

=== Government recognition and protection ===
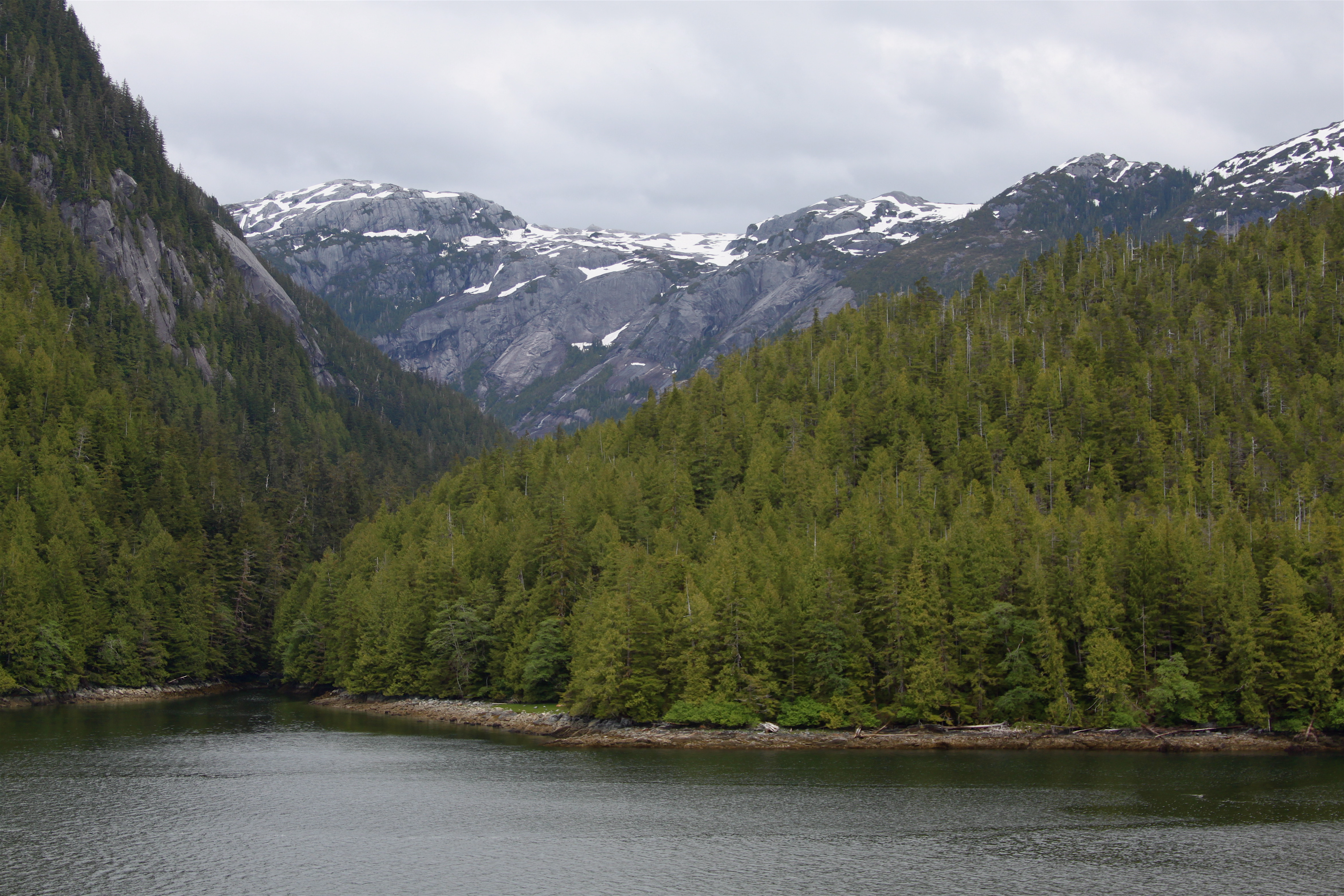
Coast Mountains along Grenville Channel

Premier Christy Clark announced on February 1, 2016, that an agreement had been reached between the government of British Columbia, First Nations, environmentalists, and the forestry industry to protect 85% of the 6.4-million-hectare Great Bear Rainforest from industrial logging. The remaining 15% would still be subject to logging under stringent conditions. The agreement also recognizes aboriginal rights to shared decision-making and provides a greater economic share of timber rights and $15 million in funding to 26 First Nations in the area.

The Great Bear Rainforest (Forest Management) Act was introduced by cabinet on March 1, 2016. In September, Prince William, Duke of Cambridge, and Catherine, Duchess of Cambridge, visited and unveiled a plaque in the forest acknowledging its admission into The Queen's Commonwealth Canopy.

=== Fuel spill ===
On 13 October 2016, the tugboat Nathan E. Stewart ran aground on a reef just off the coast of Athlone Island in Seaforth Channel (52°08′29″N 128°11′53″W) while hauling an empty 10,000-tonne tanker barge. The reef was located in the traditional territorial waters of the Heiltsuk Nation and within the larger Great Bear Rainforest. The tug leaked over 100,000 litres of diesel fuel and sank into the channel. By 26 October, the fuel tanks of the tug were emptied and about 101,131 litres of oily water was recovered. The fuel spill was the last major incident to occur in the region since BC Ferries' Queen of the North ran aground and sank off the coast of Gill Island on 21 March 2006.

Public outcry over the incident coupled with increased interest in preserving the ecological integrity of the rainforest helped to spur the passage of the Oil Tanker Moratorium Act on 21 June 2019, which prohibits any oil tanker from docking at any port along the North Coast of British Columbia.

== See also ==
- Forest Products Association of Canada
