= Spiller Inlet =

Inlet in British Columbia

Coordinates: 53°33′00″N 128°06′00″W

Spiller Inlet is an inlet in the North Coast region of the Canadian province of British Columbia. It forms the head of Spiller Channel. It was first charted in 1793 by James Johnstone, one of George Vancouver's officers during his 1791-95 expedition.
