= Dowager Island =

Island in British Columbia, Canada

Coordinates: 52°25′25″N 128°22′13″W

Dowager Island is an island in the North Coast region of British Columbia. To its west is Finlayson Channel, to it east Mathieson Channel. Susan Island lies to its north and Lady Douglas Island to its south. James Johnstone, one of George Vancouver's lieutenants during his 1791-95 expedition, first charted its west and east coasts in 1793. It was named by Captain Daniel Pender during his 1867-70 survey of the region.
