= Lama Passage =

Strait in British Columbia, Canada

Coordinates: 52°05′00″N 128°07′00″W

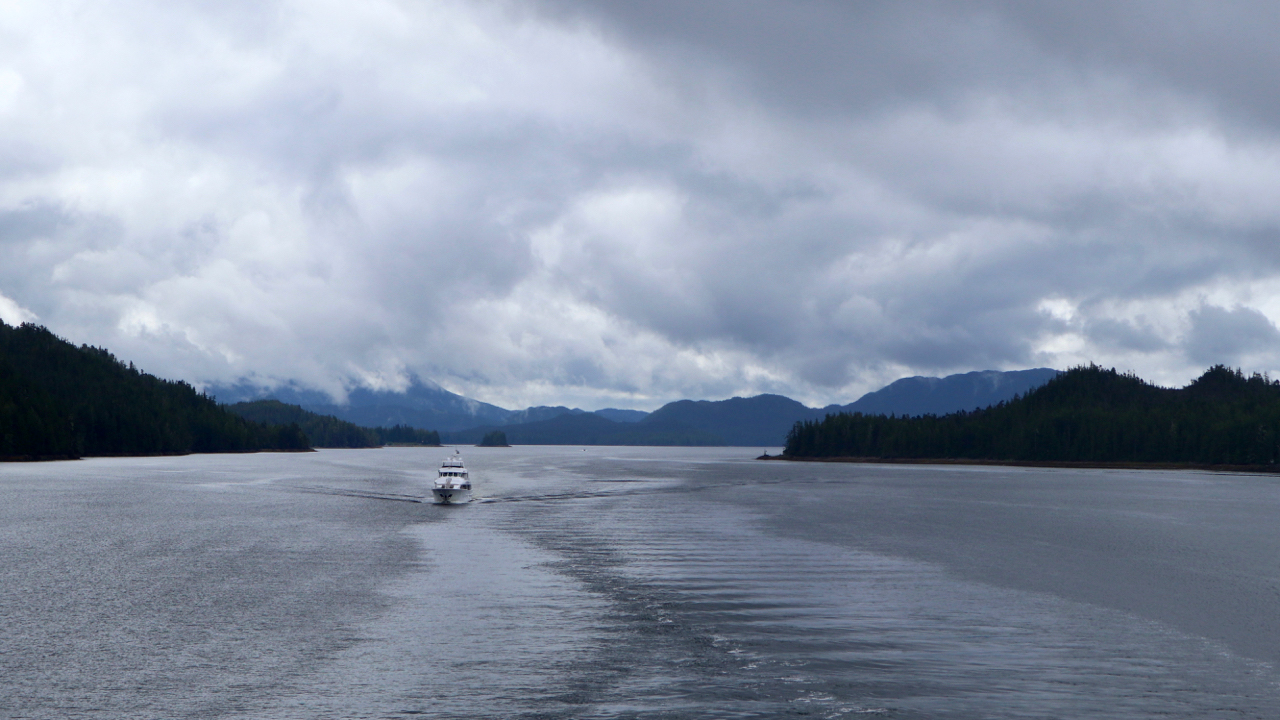
Lama Passage just south of Bella Bella

Lama Passage, sometimes referred to as Lama Pass, is a strait on the Central Coast of British Columbia, Canada, between Denny, Campbell and Hunter Islands. It is part of the Inside Passage shipping route, connecting Seaforth Channel with Fisher Channel. It was named for a Hudson's Bay Company brigantine, the Lama, under Captain McNeill (namesake of Port McNeill), which with another HBC vessel, the Dryad under Captain Kipling, brought building materials and stores from Fort Vancouver for the founding of Fort McLoughlin in 1833.
