= Athlone Island =

Island on the coast of British Columbia

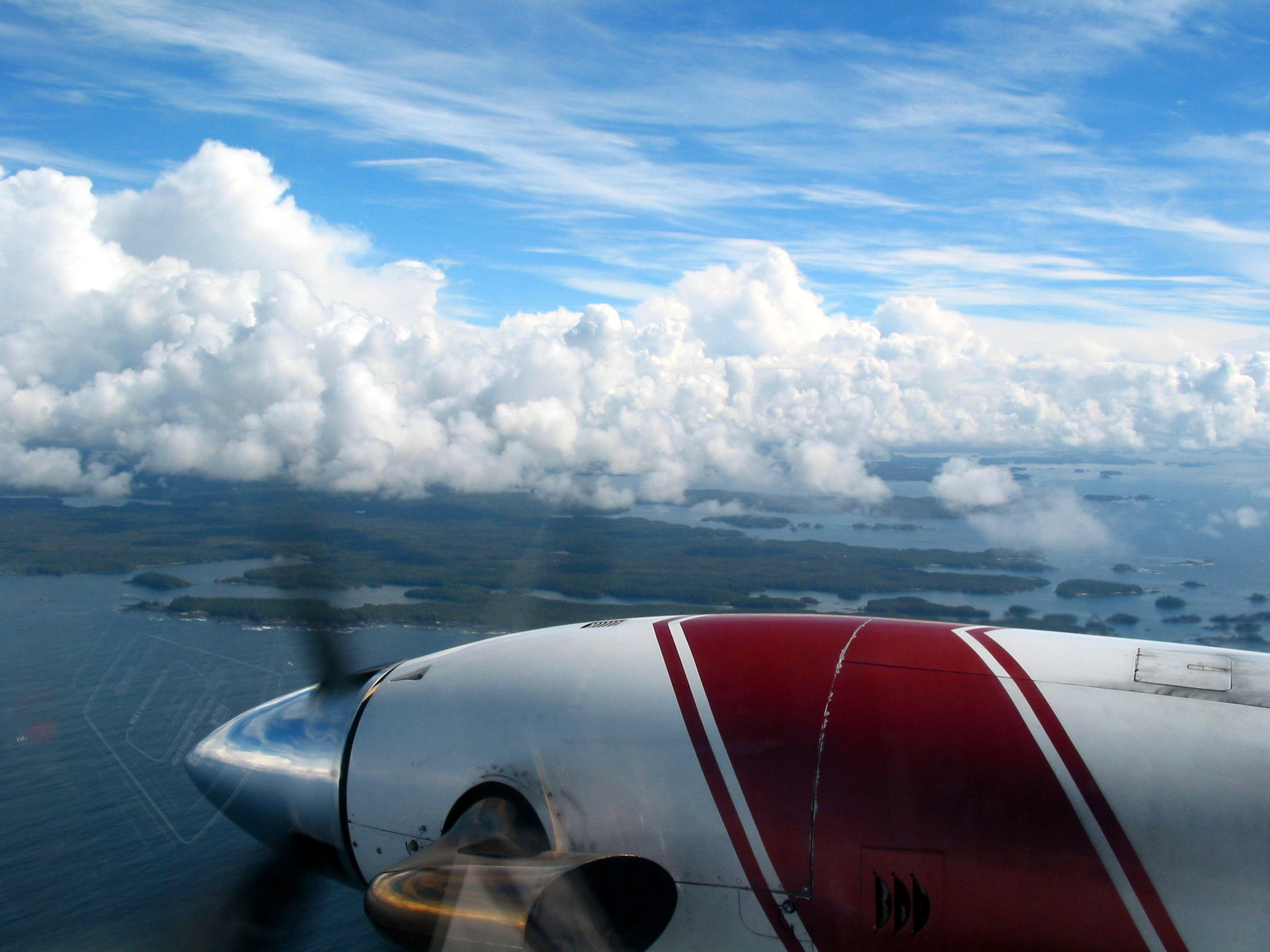
- Interactive map of Athlone Island

Geography
- Location: Seaforth Channel
- Coordinates: 52°11′26″N 128°25′58″W
- Archipelago: Central Coast of British Columbia

Administration
- Canada
- Province: British Columbia
- Regional district: Central Coast Regional District
- Land district: Range 3 Coast Land District

Demographics
- Ethnic groups: Heiltsuk Nation

Athlone Island is an island, west of Bella Bella, British Columbia in the Range 3 Coast Land District

== Features ==
Yaaklele Lagoon
located in the northwest of the island
St. John Harbour
adjacent to the west side of the island
Outer Central Coast Islands Conservancy
contains the island and surrounding archipelago, close to Hakai Luxvbalis Conservancy
Mia-yaltwa Ha’lidzogm hoon National Marine Conservation Area Reserve
protected marine area, created through an agreement between the Government of Canada, the Province of British Columbia, and six First Nations: the Wuikinuxv, Nuxalk, Kitasoo Xai’xais, Heiltsuk, Gitxaała, and Gitga’at Nations

== Geology ==
The northern end of Athlone Island is intruded by the Gale Passage dike swarm. The dikes consist of basalt, trachyte or rhyolite and are also present at the northern end of neighbouring Dufferin Island. At both locations, the dike swarm is north-trending and occurs with remnants of volcanic breccia and tuffaceous sandstone. An obsidian dike with a thickness of 2 m (6.6 ft) occurs near Cape Swaine. The Gale Passage dike swarm and associated volcanic deposits are the westernmost extent of the Anahim Volcanic Belt, which extends into the Central Interior of British Columbia.

== Oil spill ==
On September 13, 2016, after 0100 PDT, the Nathan E. Stewart ran aground and breached. Approximately 107,552 L (23,658 imp gal; 28,412 US gal) of diesel fuel and 2,240 L (490 imp gal; 590 US gal) of lubricants were released into the Seaforth Channel. Due to the oiled shores, Department of Fisheries and Oceans closed the sea cucumber and sea urchin fisheries. The John P. Tully and CCGS Bartlett were deployed to help contain the spill.

== Etymology ==
Originally labelled as Smyth Island on December 5, 1933, before being re-labelled as Athlone Island after the Alexander Cambridge, 1st Earl of Athlone on August 10, 1944.
