= Kitasu Hill =

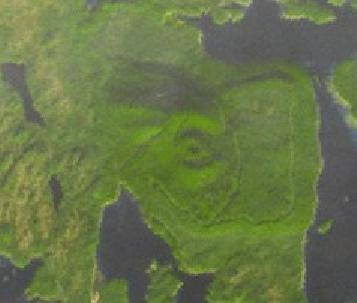
- Satellite image of Kitasu Hill (center)

Highest point
- Elevation: 235 m (771 ft)
- Prominence: 230 m (750 ft)
- Coordinates: 52.50°N 128.73°W

Geography
- Location: British Columbia, Canada
- Parent range: Kitimat Ranges

Geology
- Rock age: Holocene
- Mountain type: Monogenetic cinder cone
- Last eruption: Holocene

Kitasu Hill is a young, basaltic cinder cone on southwestern Swindle Island on the coast of the Canadian province of British Columbia. It is located 17 km (11 mi) southwest of Klemtu and south of Kitasu Bay. Kitasu Hill produced lava flows that extend to the north. It is the most prominent volcano of the Milbanke Sound Group.

== See also ==
- Volcanism of Canada
- Volcanism of Western Canada
- List of volcanoes in Canada
- Klemtu, British Columbia (alternate name is Kitasoo)
