= Koeye Range =

Mountain range in British Columbia, Canada

Coordinates: 51°45′10″N 127°46′40″W

- Location within British Columbia

Geography
- Country: Canada
- Region: British Columbia
- Parent range: Pacific Ranges

The Koeye Range is a small mountain range in southwestern British Columbia, Canada, located between the Koeye River and Elizabeth Lake. It has an area of 68 square kilometres (26 sq mi) and is a subrange of the Pacific Ranges which in turn form part of the Coast Mountains.

== See also ==
- List of mountain ranges
