= Lophelia reef =

Coral reef in British Columbia, Canada

Lophelia reef (also known by its Wakashan name q̓áuc̓íwísuxv) is a coral reef that lies some 200 m underwater in Finlayson Channel in British Columbia, Canada. It is Canada's only known living coral reef, and the Pacific Ocean's northernmost known coral reef. It was discovered in the early 2020s after two local First Nations, the Kitasoo Xai'xais and the Heiltsuk, who "knew something was there," guided deepsea ecologist Cherisse Du Preez to the waters in which the coral ecosystem lives.

Canada's Fisheries Department has closed the area over the coral reef to all commercial and recreational bottom-contact and mid-water trawl fisheries. This is, according to the Department, based on a significant scientific discovery at the small yet globally unique reef, which is highly susceptible to damage from fishing gear.

The reef's site is now being assessed for the possibility of establishing there a Parks Canada National Marine Conservation Area.
