= Heiltsuk Nation =

First Nations government in British Columbia

- Band No. 538
- Haíłzaqv
- People: Heiltsuk people
- Headquarters: Bella Bella
- Province: British Columbia

Land
- Main reserve: Bella Bella 1
- Land area: 14.2 km^{2} (5.5 sq mi)

Population (2025)
- On reserve: 1120
- On other land: 72
- Off reserve: 1334
- Total population: 2526

Government
- Chief: Marilyn Slett

Website
- www.heiltsuknation.ca

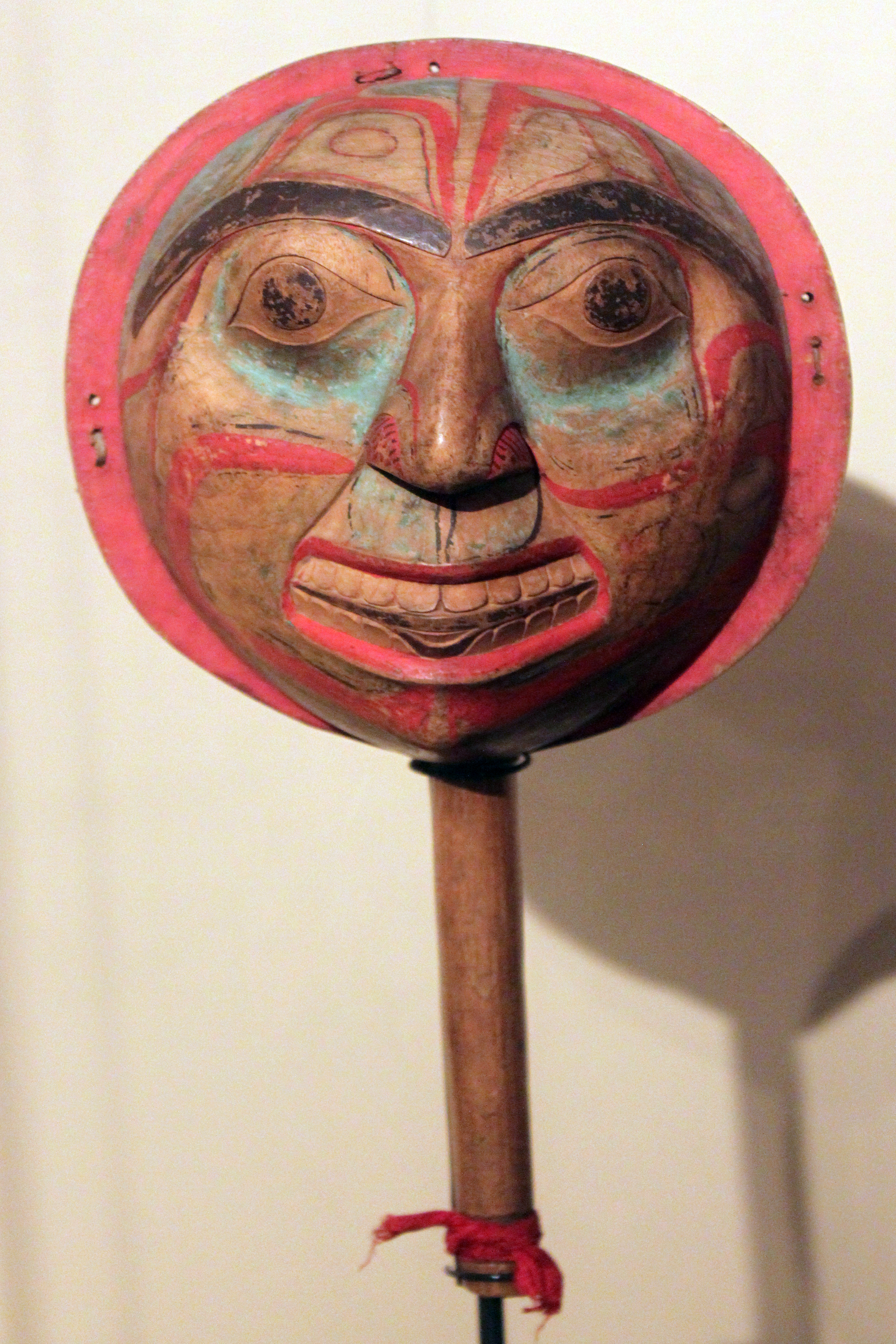
1881 Heiltsuk Shaman's rattle with sun face

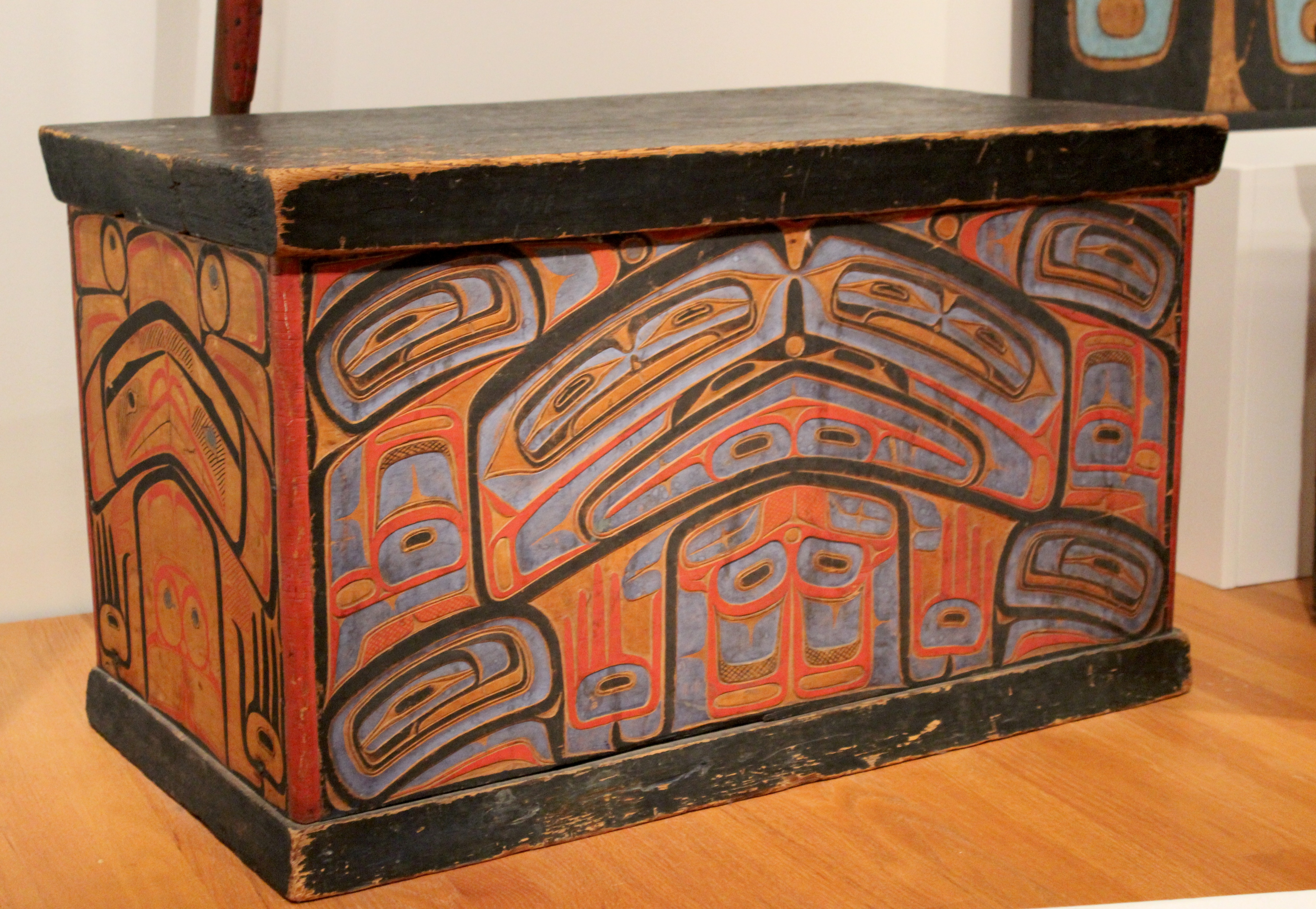
Heiltsuk bent-corner chest

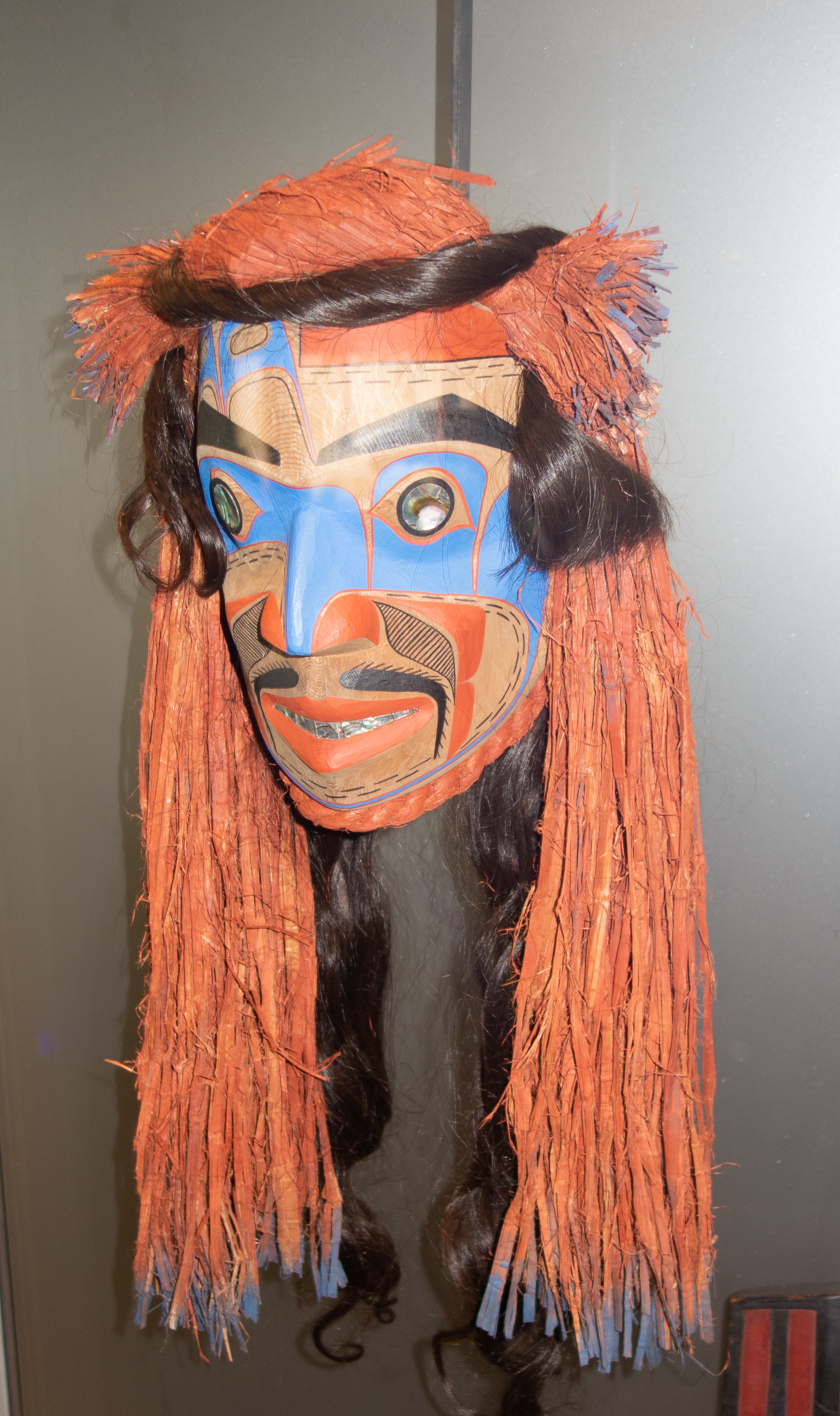
Heiltsuk mask with red hair

The Heiltsuk Nation (Heiltsuk: Haíłzaqv) is the First Nations government of Waxvwuisaxv along the Central Coast of the Canadian province of British Columbia, centred on Campbell Island in the community of Bella Bella, British Columbia. The Heiltsuk people speak the Heiltsuk language, and were, like their language, and along with the neighbouring Haisla and Wuikinuxv (Owekeeno) peoples, incorrectly known in the past as the "Northern Kwakiutl". The Heiltsuk were also known as the Bella Bella, after their core community.

The present-day Heiltsuk First Nation is an amalgamation of five tribal groups who inhabited an area approximately 6000 square miles of the Central Coast of British Columbia. The Heiltsuk peoples lived off of both land and sea in the region between Milbanke Sound and Fisher Channel. Heiltsuk country include numerous inlets, islands, peninsulas, mountains and valleys. Rivers and streams cascade into the sea through heavy forests and dense undergrowth. 'Oral traditions of the present-day Heiltsuk maintain that the first generation of their ancestors were "set-down" by the Maker in various places within Heiltsuk territory and were living here before the time of a Great Flood.' Geological evidence shows people have been living there continuously for the past 14,000 years. 1,400 of the 2,200 Heiltsuk membership live on Campbell Island, which is approximately 78 nautical miles from the British Columbia mainland, and 98 nautical miles from Vancouver Island.

== Chief and councillors ==
The Heiltsuk Nation elects a chief and 11 councillors who serve a 2–4 year term. Elections are conducted through a custom code based on the Indian Act. The most recent election was in 2018.

The current council composition is as follows:

Title	Name
Chief	Marilyn Slett
Councillor	Jaimie Harris
Councillor	Ayla Brown
Councillor	Megan Humchitt
Councillor	Jess Housty
Councillor	Louisa Housty Jones
Councillor	Lorena White
Councillor	Randy Carpenter Jr.
Councillor	Denise Carpenter
Councillor	Leona Humchitt
Councillor	Reginald Moody-Humchitt
Councillor	Travis Hall

== Language ==
The Heiltsuk are speakers of the Heiltsuk dialect of Heiltsuk-Oowekyala, which is the central member of the northern branch of the Wakashan language family. The Heiltsuk call their language Hailhzaqvla, which means "the Heiltsuk language".

The Heiltsuk also knew and used the Chinook Jargon—a trade jargon used to communicate across languages.

== Economic development ==
Established by the Heiltsuk Tribal council in 2006, the Heiltsuk Economic Development Corporation (HEDC), manages the business affairs of the Heiltsuk people. HEDC was developed to create an effective separation between business and politics in support of achieving the communities economic development goals.

== Education and cultural institutions ==
The Heiltsuk Cultural Education Centre is located in the Bella Bella Community School (Right, High school wing). Founded in 1975, the Heiltsuk Cultural Education Centre marked the Heiltsuk (then known as the Bella Bella Indian Band) determination to ensure the preservation and revitalization of Heiltsuk culture.

For over twenty years, the Heiltsuk Cultural Education Centre has been devoted to researching, preserving, and revitalizing the history, language and cultural traditions of the Heiltsuk Nation, located on the Central Coast of British Columbia, Canada. —Heiltsuk Cultural Centre website.

The Heiltsuk hosted a major ocean-going canoe festival in Bella Bella in July 2014. Some 60 canoes from as far away as Washington State, as well from Nations all up and down the coast traveled to Bella Bella for the Qatuwas Festival.

The Heiltsuk were subjected to the Indian residential school system for much of the 20th century. The struggle to achieve a Heiltsuk-run school is referred to in the 1975 NFB film Bella Bella. The Bella Bella Community School is a Heiltsuk-run school offering K-12 schooling.

== Great Bear Rainforest ==
The Heiltsuk "territory is located at the heart" of the largest intact old-growth forest in the world, the Great Bear Rainforest. The Great Bear Rainforest was officially recognized by the Government of British Columbia in February 2016, and is Canada's contribution to the Queen's Commonwealth Canopy (QCC), a unique indigenous forest conservation initiative established in 2015 which now includes 16 of the 52 Commonwealth nations Industrial logging in the Great Bear Rainforest will be decreased in order to permanently conserve 85% of the forest.

Fuel spill

On October 13, 2016, an American tugboat, the Nathan E Stewart, holding approximately 200,000 litres of industrial oils including diesel, while attached to a massive empty American oil barge, ran hard aground on a reef off Athlone Island near Bella Bella when the tugboat missed its turn into Seaforth Channel while transiting in Canadian waters on its return trip from Alaska.

== History ==
Archeologist Alisha Gauvreau, a PhD student from the University of Victoria and a scholar with the Hakai Institute, discovered a site on Triquet Island on British Columbia's Central Coast which appears to confirm Heiltsuk oral tradition. The archeological team have excavated a settlement in the area in traditional Heiltsuk Nation territory and dated it to 14,000 years ago, during the last ice age where glaciers covered much of North America.

The 1997 Supreme Court of Canada decision in R. v. Gladstone found that the Heiltsuk have an Indigenous right to trade in Herring. This was the first decision recognizing a commercial Indigenous right in Canada. Despite winning the decision, the dispute over Heiltsuk access to herring, and management of the stock have persisted. The 2015 herring season saw a crisis develop between the Heiltsuk and Canada, including occupation of a DFO office. The crisis ended when the commercial herring gillnet fleet departed without fishing. The Heiltsuk have a long history and relationship with herring. The 1997 Supreme Court of Canada decision R. v. Gladstone was a significant legal and constitutional victory for the Heiltsuk. The SCC found that the Heiltsuk have a pre-existing Indigenous right to herring that includes a commercial element. Since the Gladstone decision was rendered the Heiltsuk have been in a dispute with Canada regarding implementation of the ruling as well as with the science used by the DFO. The dispute boiled over in 2015 with the Heiltsuk occupying the local DFO office.

The Heiltsuk became involved in early efforts in the 1990s to conserve the Great Bear Rainforest. On January 29, 2016, in the Heiltsuk community of Bella Bella—along with representatives from other First Nations, industry, government and NGOs—they celebrated the completion of the final accord to protect the largest coastal temperate rainforest in the world.

A fire destroyed the only food store in the village recently. As a stop-gap measure the United Church became the "United Store" while a new building was constructed. This response occurred very quickly and managed to provide services to the community during a difficult time. The Heiltsuk have been opposed to the Enbridge Northern Gateway Pipelines proposal, with some well-publicized hearings in Bella Bella.

In February 2025, the Heiltsuk passed a written constitution via referendum, with 67% voting in favour. The document was ratified in May, with next steps planned toward "developing core laws" that are expected to cover land management, language, and other issues.

== Nomenclature ==
The Heiltsuk are not well known among non-Indigenous people. Part of this is due to the confusing terminology applied to First Nations over time. The Heiltsuk have been subsumed, inaccurately, as 'Northern Kwakiutl', Kwakiutl, and have also been known as Bella Bella (Indians), Milbanke Indians and by tribal terminology that applies to smaller tribal groups of the Heiltsuk.

== See also ==
- Bella Bella, BC
- Chinook Jargon
- Fort McLoughlin
- Heiltsuk
- Indigenous peoples in Canada
- Northwest coast art
- Old Bella Bella
