= Roderick Finlayson =

Canadian Hudson's Bay Company officer, farmer, businessman and politician

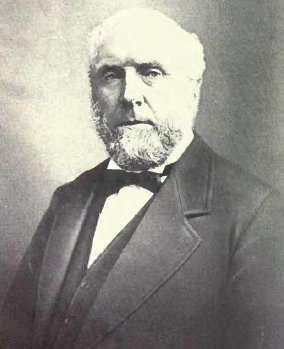

12th Mayor of Victoria
- In office 1877–1879
- Preceded by: Montague Tyrwhitt-Drake
- Succeeded by: John Herbert Turner

Personal details
- Born: March 16, 1818; Loch Alsh (Kyle of Lochalsh), Scotland
- Died: January 20, 1892 (aged 73); Victoria, British Columbia
- Resting place: Ross Bay Cemetery
- Spouse: Sarah Work (m. 1849)
- Children: 11
- Occupation: Fur trader, farmer, businessman and politicians

Roderick Finlayson (March 16, 1818 – January 20, 1892) was a Canadian Hudson's Bay Company officer, farmer, businessman, and politician.

Born in Loch Alsh (Kyle of Lochalsh), Scotland, Finlayson came to North America in 1837. He moved to Lower Canada into an apprentice clerk position with the Hudson's Bay Company (HBC).

As an HBC clerk, Finlayson worked under Charles Ross in the building of Fort Victoria in 1843–1844. Upon Ross's death, which he mentions with sympathy in his autobiography, Finlayson was promoted to command of the HBC's Fort Victoria in 1844. After Chief Factor James Douglas arrived from Fort Vancouver in 1849, Finlayson was reassigned to second in command. Also in 1849 he married Sarah Work, one of John Work's Metis daughters.

In 1850 Finlayson was promoted to the rank of Chief Trader, and in 1859 to Chief Factor. Finlayson retired from the HBC in 1872. In 1878 he was elected mayor of Victoria.

Finlayson was one of the few to see Victoria grow from bare ground to the Capital of British Columbia. He was called the "father of Victoria" by chronicler of BC history, John Walbran.

Finlayson Arm, Finlayson Point, Mount Finlayson and Roderick Island are named for Roderick Finlayson.
