= Seaforth Channel =

Watercourse in Canada

- French: Canal Seaforth
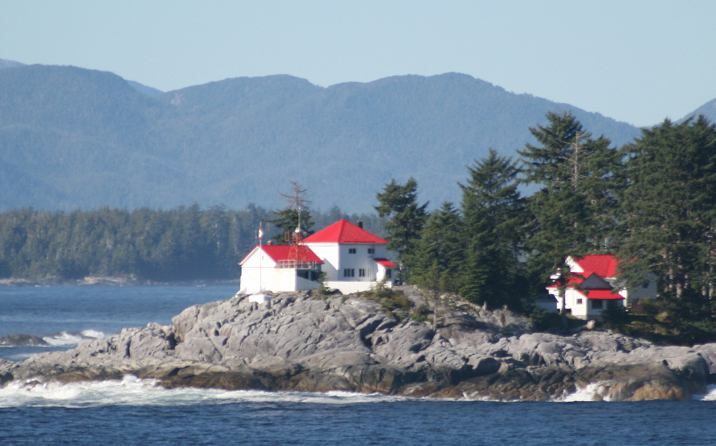
- Ivory Island Lighthouse at the northwest entrance to Seaforth Channel
- Interactive map of Seaforth Channel
- Coordinates: 52.2467°N 128.2995°W
- Part of: Inside Passage
- Primary outflows: Milbanke Sound; Lama Passage
- Basin countries: Canada
- Designation: Voluntary Tanker Exclusion Zone
- Islands: Athlone Island; Dufferin Island; Horsfall Island; Campbell Island; Denny Island; Ivory Island; Beasley Islands
- Settlements: Bella Bella, Shearwater

Seaforth Channel is a marine channel in the Central Coast region of the Canadian province of British Columbia which is part of the Inside Passage marine highway. The channel extends westward from Denny Island to Milbanke Sound, with Campbell Island and the Wright Group forming much of its southern shore. The channel is also part of the Prince Rupert/Port Hardy BC ferry route.

The channel is located within the Great Bear Rainforest region, and borders the Outer Central Coast Islands Conservancy, the Lady Douglas-Don Penninsula Conservancy, and the Troup Passage Conservancy. The channel is part of the traditional territorial waters of the Heiltsuk Nation, and forms part of the marine environment surrounding Bella Bella, British Columbia, the Nation's principal community.

In October 2016, a Texas-owned tug/barge transiting the Canadian waters of the Inside Passage without a local pilot was hard grounded on Edge Reef at the entrance to Seaforth Channel in October 2016. More than 100,000 L (22,000 imp gal; 26,000 US gal) of fuel contaminated the coast, coves and shores 20 km (12 mi) west of Bella Bella.

== Physical features ==
Lama Passage extends from Seaforth Channel to Fitzburgh Sound with Dryad Point across from Saunders Island at the junction. "Wood Island and Ark Island are close offshore at the junction of Seaforth Channel and Troup Passage. Newby Island, Munsie Point and Christiansen Point lie 0.5 to 2 mi (0.80 to 3.22 km) WNW of Ark Island. Nose Island, 0.6 mi (0.97 km) west of Christiansen Point, is steep-to on its south side and has a conspicuous tree about 60 m (200 ft) high."

Ivory Island with its lighthouse is the northwest entrance point to Seaforth Channel. Since the nineteenth century, it was well-known that the "north shores of Seaforth Channel [were] much more irregular in outline than the southern shores." The area surrounding the Beazley Islands which lie southeast of Dearth Island and north of Nose Island, "is encumbered with numerous small islets and drying and below-water rocks."

The south shore of Seaforth Channel is not as irregular as the north side. After Athlone, Dufferin, Horsfall and Campbell islands the channel makes a sharp turn to the passage between Campbell Island and Denny Island. It extends along Denny Island to the junction with Lama Passage between Hunter Island and Denny Island. The tug/barge that ran aground on Edge Reef off Athlone Island at the entrance to the Seaforth Channel in October 2016 was heading south.

Denniston Point on Dufferin Island, Idol Point on the south side of the channel and Bush Point are located on Seaforth Channel.

== Inside Passage shipping route ==
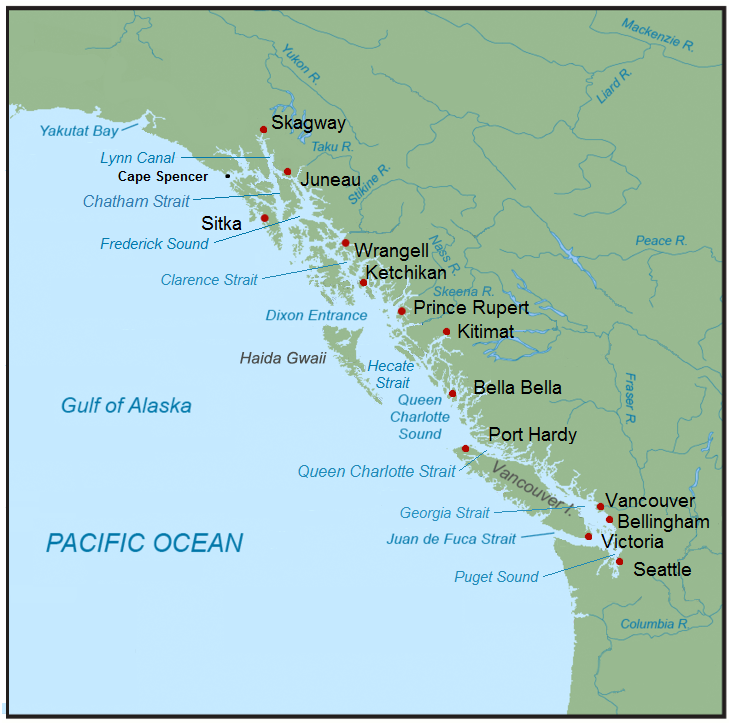
Inside Passage

The inland passage refers to a coastal shipping route along a network of passages which weave through the islands on the Pacific coast of North America from Alaska to Washington. Marine traffic prefers to use the inside passage when weather makes travel on the open Pacific Ocean more challenging. It is now a marine highway with cruise ships, freighters, tugs with tows, fishing craft and ships of the Alaska Marine Highway, BC Ferries, and Washington State Ferries. British Columbia's portion of the Inside Passage has up to 25,000 miles (40,000 km) of coastline including the Strait of Georgia the Johnstone Strait, the Hecate Strait and Fitz Hugh Sound.

By 1880, the shipping route that was "usually adopted by steamers and others desiring to make the inland passage from Queen Charlotte Sound to Dixon Entrance, is by way of Fitzhugh Sound, Lama Passage, Seaforth Channel, Milbank Sound, Finlayson and Grenville channels, and Chatham Sound tn Dixon Entrance." Lama Passage connected Seaforth Channel with Fisher Channel. The Seaforth Channel and Lama Passage meet at the northern end of Campbell Island.

Marine traffic on the central coast prefer Seaforth Channel especially "when weather makes travel difficult further offshore."

== 2016 Oil Spill Incident ==
Just after 01:00:00, October 13, 2016 (PDT), a Texas-owned articulated tug/barge—a 28 m (92 ft) tugboat, the Nathan E Stewart, secured to the stern of an empty 90 m (295 ft) petroleum barge DBL 55—ran hard aground on the Edge Reef off Athlone Island at the entrance to Seaforth Channel in the Heiltsuk Nation's traditional territorial waters. contaminating the Seaforth Channel area with "more than 100,000 litres of fuel." The Nathan E Stewart held approximately 200,000 L (44,000 imp gal; 53,000 US gal) of industrial oils including diesel. Although the Seaforth Channel is part of the Voluntary Tanker Exclusion Zone, the Nathan E. Stewart which is a U.S. vessel under 10,000 gross tonnage was allowed to operate by the Pacific Pilotage Authority, "without a local pilot on the West Coast of Canada." This is a common practice "if the crew meets a minimum standard of experience and licensing." None of the seven-member crew of the Nathan E Stewart were injured.

The fuel spill was about 20 km (12 mi) west of Bella Bella, the core community of the Heiltsuk Nation. The fuel spill threatens "dozens of species that are harvested in the area, including manila clam beds that provide income of up to $150,000 per year for the community." A shellfish harvesting ban was imposed on October 14. The fuel spill is in the environmentally sensitive Great Bear Rainforest - the largest intact old-growth forest in the world. The operator responsible for the tug and barge are Kirby Offshore Marine, a Texas-based operator. In 2011 when the Nathan E Stewart lost power and was set adrift in rough waters of Alaska, journalists at the time drew attention to the Pacific Pilotage Authority waiver that exempted the barge which makes routine weekly runs "between Vancouver and Alaska through the Inside Passage" "from the requirement of having Canadian pilots on board." Following the October incident, the Pacific Pilotage Authority revoked the barge's waiver.

At 02:19:00, October 13, 2016 (PDT) Canadian Coast Guard arrived from CCG Station Bella Bella to lead the cleanup, and called in the Western Canada Marine Response Corporation (WCMRC) at 04:30:00, October 13, 2016 (PDT). Vessels and crew from Vancouver and Prince Rupert arrived on site over the next few days. A "mobile skimming vessel, boom skiff, work boat, and tug, along with a total of 2,500 feet of boom" were on site. The tugboat "settled under nine metres of water in Seaforth Channel." By October 26 the tanks of fuel on the submerged tug had been pumped out and "110,131 litres of an oil-water mixture" were recovered but oil was discovered in at "least three coves in Seaforth Channel." The U.S.-flagged Resolve Pioneer, the only privately funded salvage tug in North America, arrived from Dutch Harbor, Alaska on November 8, but bad weather delayed the salvage operation, eventually, the damaged Nathan E. Stewart was raised from the sea floor on November 14. It was hauled to Surrey, B.C. on November 19 but cleanup continued.

The Heiltsuk, B.C. Premier Christy Clark and Prime Minister Justin Trudeau criticized the oil spill response as "inadequate" and "unacceptable." The incident highlighted concerns about lack of capacity of existing response teams as on the eve of proposed pipelines which would lead to even more tanker traffic on the Inside Passage. On November 6 in Bella Bella Federal Minister of Transportation Marc Garneau met briefly with Heiltsuk hereditary and elected chiefs, and on November 7 in Vancouver Prime Minister Trudeau announced a $1.5B ocean protection plan which will "creating a marine safety system, restoring marine ecosystems and research into oil spill cleanup methods."

"The ongoing incident at Bella Bella is unacceptable...It's time for a change."

— Prime Minister Justin Trudeau

== See also ==
- British Columbia Coast
- List of islands of British Columbia
- BC Ferries
- Alaska Marine Highway
- List of lighthouses in British Columbia
