= Bullock Channel =

Coordinates: 52°23′00″N 128°04′00″W

Bullock Channel is a channel of the North Coast of British Columbia, Canada. It separates Yeo Island from the Coldwell Peninsula. It was first charted in 1793 by James Johnstone, one of George Vancouver's lieutenants during his 1791–95 expedition.

== See also ==
- Mount Bullock
- Bullock (disambiguation)
