= Swindle Island =

Island in British Columbia, Canada

Coordinates: 52°32′00″N 128°35′00″W

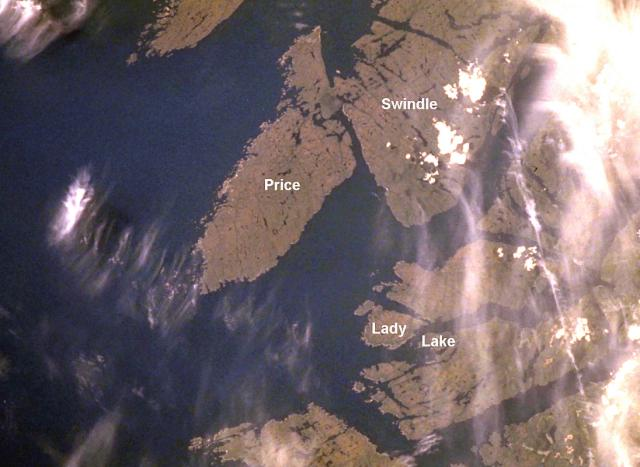
Satellite photo of the Milbanke Sound Group, including Price, Swindle, Lake, and Lady Douglas Islands

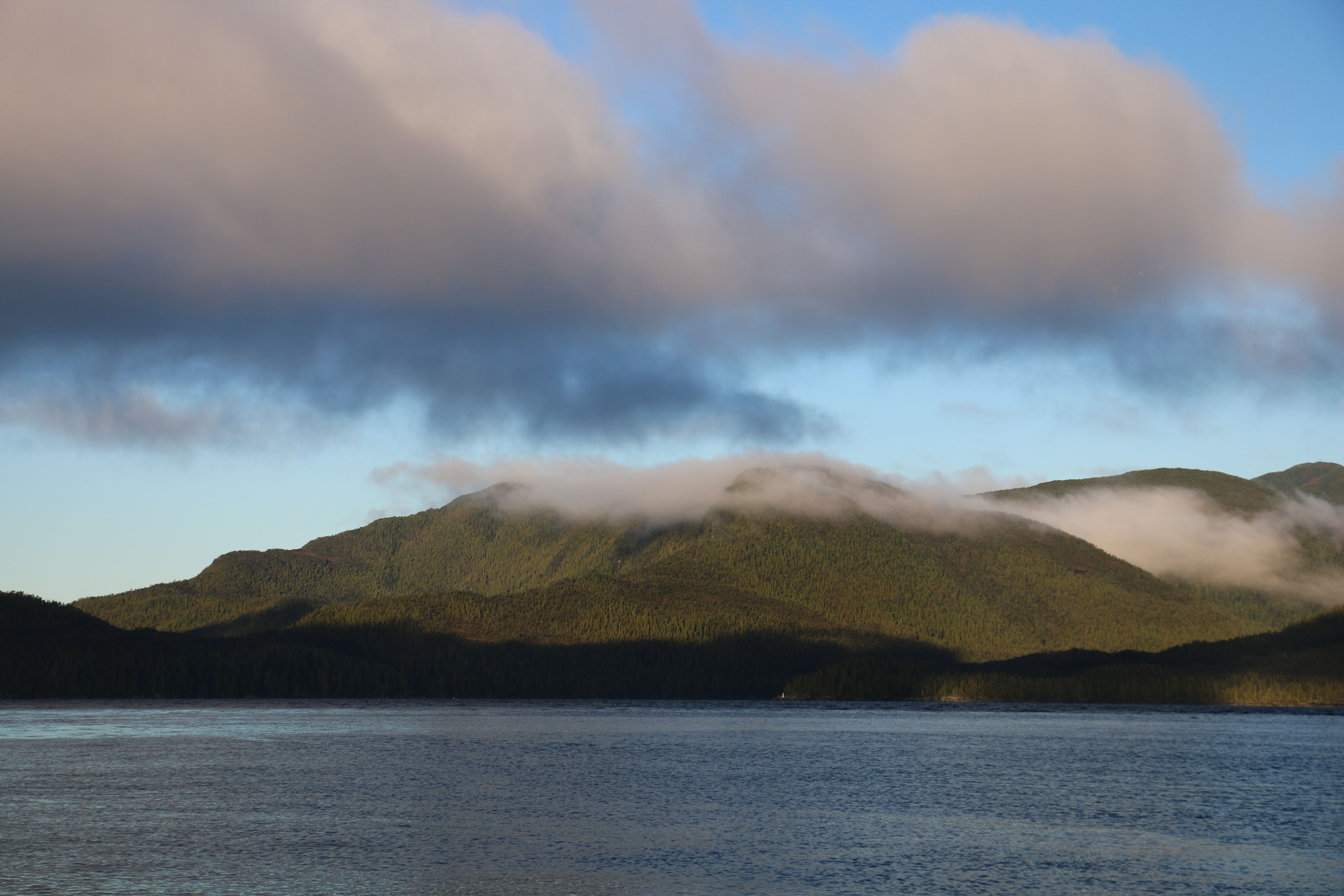
Southern portion of Swindle Island

Swindle Island is an island on the North Coast of the Canadian province of British Columbia. It is located south of Princess Royal Island on the Inside Passage shipping route. The small First Nations community of Klemtu is located on its eastern side across from Cone Island. Price Island lies just south of Swindle Island. Both are located within the Kitimat-Stikine Regional District. Swindle Island's southernmost extremity is Jorkins Point, which lies at the confluence of Milbanke Sound and Finlayson Channel.

Swindle Island is part of a volcanic centre called the Milbanke Sound Group which includes several monogenetic cinder cones. Kitasu Hill on the western side of Swindle Island is a young basaltic cinder cone that produced lava flows that extend to the north.
