= Lady Douglas Island =

Island in British Columbia, Canada

Coordinates: 52.337°N 128.422°W

Lady Douglas Island is an island in the North Coast region of the Canadian province of British Columbia. It is located off the south coast of Dowager Island.

Lady Douglas Island is part of a volcanic area called the Milbanke Sound Group which includes monogenetic cinder cones. Basaltic tuff breccias on Lady Douglas Island originated from Helmet Peak on the north end of Lake Island.
