= Work Channel =

Channel in British Columbia, Canada

- formerly Wark Channel
- Interactive map of Work Channel
- Location: British Columbia, Canada
- Coordinates: 54°29′03″N 130°13′13″W
- Type: fjord
- Etymology: Named after John Work (born John Wark) by Hudson's Bay Company officers, c.1837
- Part of: Coast Mountains
- Basin countries: Canada
- Max. length: 48 kilometres (30 mi)
- Surface area: 110 square kilometres (42 sq mi)

Work Channel formerly Wark Channel is a fjord in the North Coast region of the Canadian province of British Columbia. It lies to the northeast of the Tsimpsean Peninsula. It was named about 1837 by officers of the Hudson's Bay Company after John Work, born John Wark. It was first charted in 1793 by James Johnstone and Robert Barrie, two of George Vancouver's officers during his 1791-95 expedition.

== Geology ==
This lineament is not a discrete fault but a crustal boundary separating two contrasting metamorphic structural domains. The eastern side records a younger Eocene low-pressure high-temperature metamorphism (characterized by sillimanite-bearing pelitic schists and migmatitic gneisses), whereas the western side preserves an older Jurassic metamorphic gradient (chlorite → kyanite → muscovite migmatite) associated with crustal burial and thrusting.
