= Roderick Island =

Island in British Columbia, Canada

- Location in British Columbia
- Etymology: Named after Roderick Finlayson

Geography
- Location: Finlayson Channel, Mathieson Channel
- Coordinates: 52°38′55″N 128°22′11″W

Administration
- Canada
- Province: British Columbia

Roderick Island is an island in the North Coast region of British Columbia. To its west is Finlayson Channel, to its northeast Pooley Island, and to its south the Mathieson Channel and Susan Island. James Johnstone, one of George Vancouver's lieutenants during his 1791-95 expedition, first charted its north and west coasts in 1793. It was named by Captain Daniel Pender after Roderick Finlayson.
