= Mathieson Channel =

Coordinates: 52°38′00″N 128°11′00″W

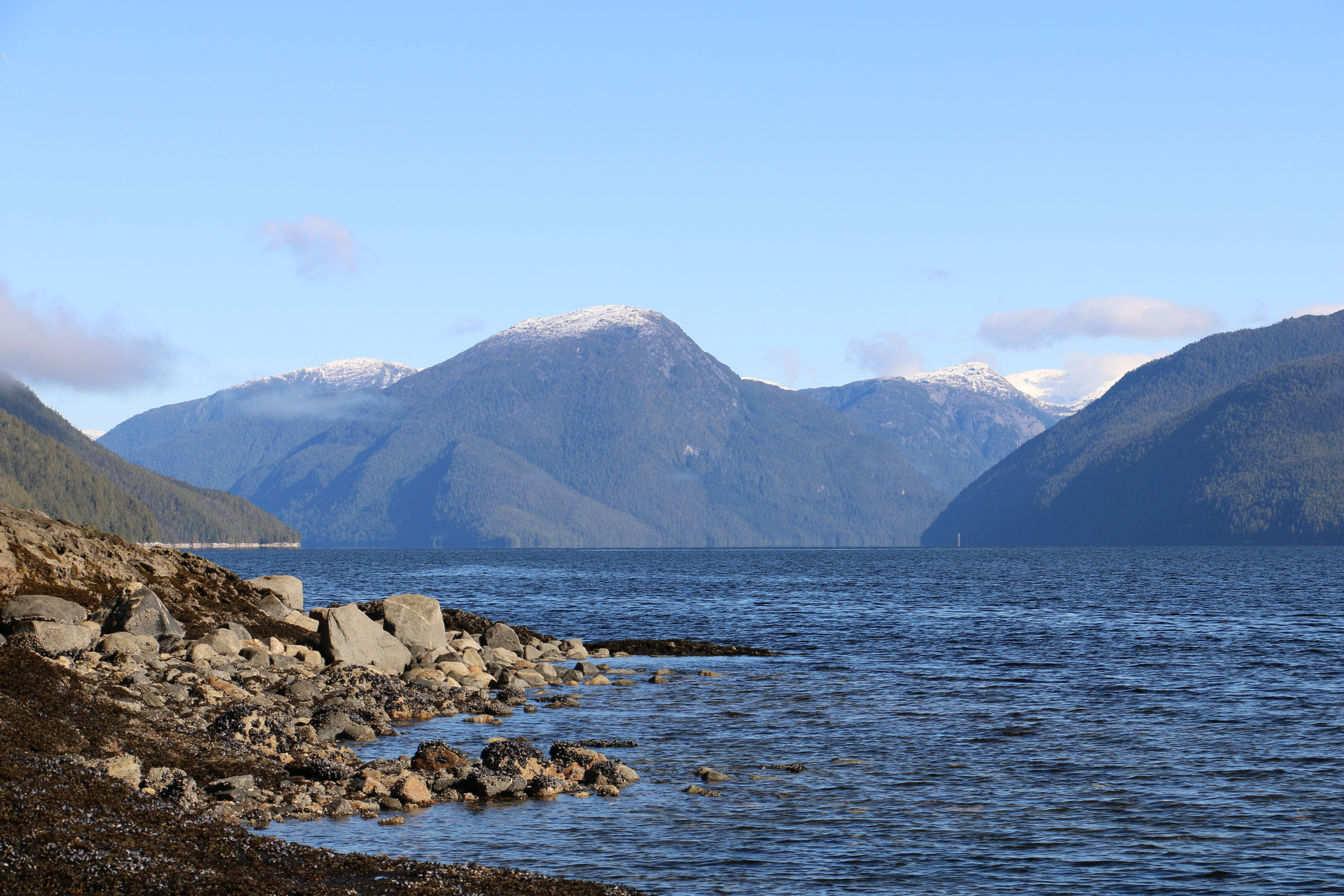
Mathieson Channel, looking towards Kynoch Inlet

Mathieson Channel is a channel of the British Columbia Coast. It is a northern extension of Milbanke Sound. To its west are Pooley, Roderick, Susan and Dowager Islands, to its east the Don Peninsula. It was first charted in 1793 by James Johnstone, one of George Vancouver's lieutenants during his 1791-95 expedition.
