= Don Peninsula =

Peninsula in British Columbia, Canada

Coordinates: 52°30′00″N 128°10′00″W

The Don Peninsula is a peninsula in British Columbia, Canada. It extends southwest between the Mathieson and Spiller Channels in the Milbanke Sound area. Later discovered to be a peninsula, it was first charted as an island.
