= Milbanke Sound =

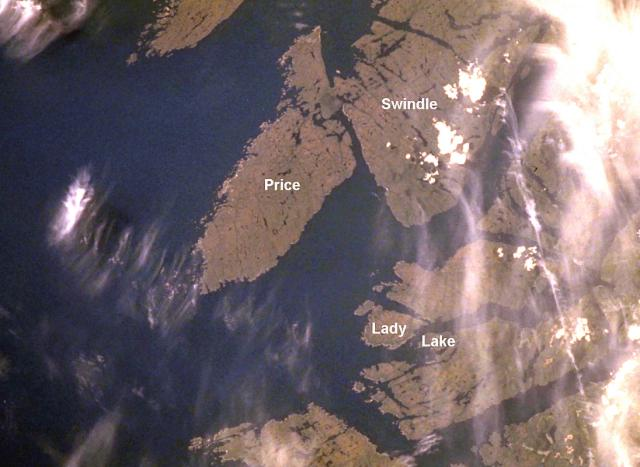
- Satellite image of Milbanke Sound

- Location in British Columbia
- Location: British Columbia, Canada
- Coordinates: 52°19′N 128°33′W
- Type: Sound
- Ocean/sea sources: Pacific Ocean

Milbanke Sound is a sound on the coast of the Canadian province of British Columbia.

== Geography ==
Milbanke Sound extends east from Queen Charlotte Sound, with Price Island on the west, Swindle Island on the north, and the Bardswell Group of islands on the south. Milbanke Sound is one of the open sea portions of the Inside Passage, with Seaforth Channel joining from the east and Finlayson Channel from the north. Mathieson Channel also connects to Milbanke Sound from the north, and leads to Fiordland Conservancy.

On the islands surrounding the sound is a group of five volcanos called the Milbanke Sound cones.

== History ==
The Heiltsuk peoples traditionally governed the land around Milbanke Sound.

In late June, 1788, the British fur trader Charles Duncan, captain of Princess Royal, entered Milbanke Sound, which was then uncharted waters. He spent a few days trading with the Heiltsuk. He named the sound after Vice Admiral Mark Milbanke. Explorer George Vancouver sailed through the sound a few years later. In 1805, a trading ship from Boston, the Atahualpa, was attacked by a group of Tlingit; the captain and some of the crew were killed.

In 1833 the Hudson's Bay Company established Fort McLoughlin in the Milbanke Sound area. William Fraser Tolmie was stationed there in 1833-1834. Tolmie wrote about the fur trade in the area, saying that it was conducted with the Coast Tsimshians and Heiltsuks, using a pidgin jargon composed of the Kaigani and Tshatshinni dialects of Haida and English. Chinook Jargon, commonly used elsewhere, was not widely known in Milbanke Sound at the time. The fort operated for about ten years, and then was abandoned; the company later opened a small store at the same location.

To improve the safety of the developing travel and shipping lanes, a lighthouse was built in 1898 at Robb Point on Ivory Island.

In recent times archaeological investigations have been carried out in the Milbanke Sound area.

== Economy ==
The sound is popular with sports fishing enthusiasts.

== See also ==
- Milbanke Sound Group
