= Finlayson Channel =

Waterway in British Columbia, Canada

Coordinates: 52°38′N 128°28′W

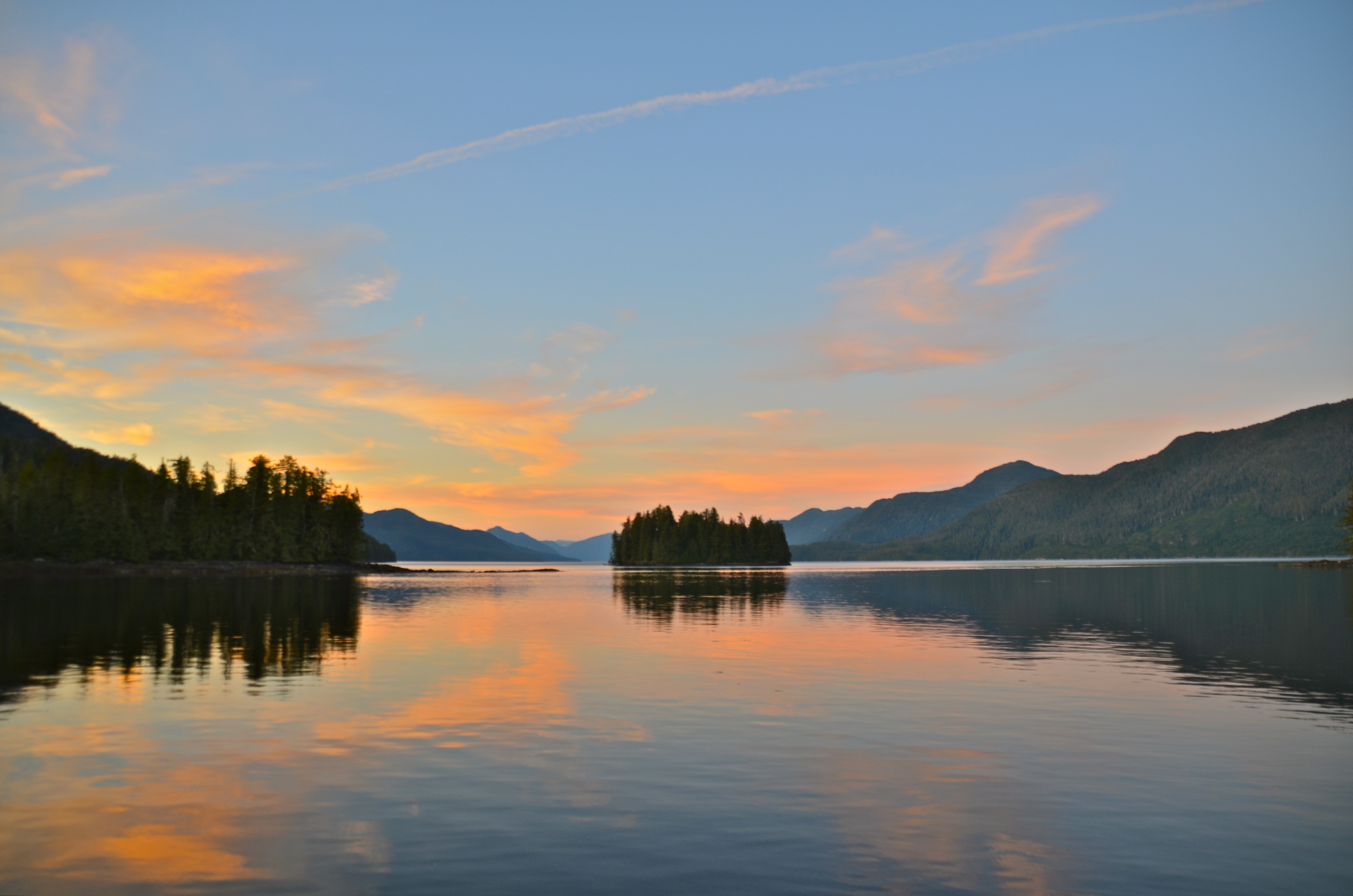
Finlayson Channel

Finlayson Channel is a channel of the British Columbia Coast, Canada. It is a northern extension of Milbanke Sound. To its west are Swindle and Sarah Islands, to its east Roderick, Susan and Dowager Islands. It was first charted in 1793 by James Johnstone, one of George Vancouver's lieutenants during his 1791–95 expedition.

Finlayson Channel is home to Lophelia reef, the Pacific Ocean's northernmost known coral reef, and Canada's only known living example.
