= Dufferin Island =

Island in British Columbia, Canada

Coordinates: 52.2171°N 128.3475°W

Dufferin Island is an island on the Central Coast of British Columbia, Canada, on the south side of Seaforth Channel just northwest of Bella Bella. It was named in 1876 by Captain Chatfield and the officers of HMS Amethyst after Frederick Hamilton-Temple-Blackwood.

Dufferin Island is part of a volcanic area called the Milbanke Sound Group which includes several monogenetic cinder cones. Holocene basaltic lava flows from Dufferin Island overlie adjacent beach deposits.
