= Spiller Channel =

Coordinates: 52°21′00″N 128°11′00″W

Spiller Channel is a channel of the British Columbia Coast. It separates the Don Peninsula from Yeo Island. It was first charted in 1793 by James Johnstone, one of George Vancouver's lieutenants during his 1791–95 expedition.
