= James Johnstone (explorer) =

British naval officer and explorer

James Johnstone (c. 1759 – 1823) was a British naval officer and explorer. He is noted for having served as sailing master of the armed tender HMS Chatham and later acting lieutenant during George Vancouver's 1791–1795 expedition to the Pacific Northwest. Johnstone Strait in British Columbia is named after him.

== Naval and private career ==
Johnstone joined the navy early in 1779, serving aboard the ships HMS Keppel (a 14-gun sloop), HMS La Fortune (a recently captured French frigate), HMS Formidable, HMS Queen, and HMS Assistance; during this time he sailed to New York, the West Indies (several times), and participated in the Battle of the Chesapeake. On the last ship he met Archibald Menzies, whom Johnstone would become lifelong friends with. He was appointed master in 1785, receiving his master's certificate the following year. Both he and Menzies were discharged in August 1786. Despite passing his lieutenant's examination the next month, he wouldn't receive his commission until seven years later.

In October 1786 Johnstone left Britain as mate of Prince of Wales under James Colnett on a voyage to the Northwest coast of North America in search of sea otter. Menzies accompanied him. In January 1789 in Macau, when Colnett decided to take another ship, Argonaut, back to the Northwest coast, Johnstone assumed command of Prince of Wales. He sailed the ship back to Britain, which he reached in July.

== Vancouver expedition ==
After rejoining the navy, Johnstone signed on as master of HMS Chatham, which would accompany George Vancouver in HMS Discovery on an upcoming voyage to chart the Northwest coast of America. His old friend Menzies was appointed naturalist of the expedition. The two ships left in April 1791, reaching what is now the U.S. state of Washington in the spring of 1792. During the next three summers (1792, 1793, and 1794), Johnstone would lead many of the boat parties that surveyed the intricate coastline that makes up much of the region. During the first summer, besides helping to chart Hood Canal and exploring up Bute and Loughborough Inlets, as well as Fitz Hugh Sound and Burke Channel. Johnstone, early in July, discovered what Vancouver later named Johnstone Strait in his honor.

During the following surveying season, 1793, with first lieutenant Peter Puget having been promoted commander of Chatham in William Robert Broughton's absence, Johnstone led more of the boat surveys—often splitting them with Discovery's sailing master, Joseph Whidbey. That spring and summer, Johnstone was sent out on at least six major boat surveys, lasting from only a few days to nearly two weeks in one case. During these journeys he explored and charted North and South Bentinck Arms; Bullock, Spiller, Mathieson, and Finlayson Channels and Spiller and Mussel Inlets; the northern half of Princess Royal Channel and Whale and Squally Channels; Work Channel and Khutzeymateen and Quottoon Inlets; and Clarence Strait, Ernest Sound, Blake Channel and Eastern Passage, and Bradfield and Duncan Canals. In exploring these channels and inlets, he charted the coasts of several islands, including Roderick Island and the east side of Princess Royal Island in modern British Columbia, and the south side of Kupreanof Island and parts of Wrangell, Zarembo and Etolin Islands in present-day Southeast Alaska. In the spring and summer of 1794 he only led two major boat surveys. During the first he charted the east side of Prince William Sound, while during the second he charted much of the northwestern half of Kuiu Island—in doing so proving its insular nature.

== Later naval career and death ==
After the voyage Johnstone was confirmed in the rank of lieutenant, after having served as acting lieutenant of Chatham since 11 June 1793. Early in 1796 he is believed to have served on HMS Shannon before returning to HMS Formidable. The same year he moved to HMS Sans Pareil, sailing to the West Indies in 1798. Menzies, once again, accompanied him. In September 1801, while acting as commander-lieutenant of the 18-gun ship-sloop Lark near Cuba, he captured the Spanish privateer-schooner Esperanza. In June 1802 he was promoted commander, commanding the sloop Shark the same year. He later commanded the sloop Alert (1804) in the North Sea as well as HMS Curieux (1805–06); he captured two Spanish privateers while commanding the latter. In January 1806 he was promoted to captain, being appointed to HMS Leopard in 1808—on which he was part of a convoy to the Cape of Good Hope, from where he continued on to the East Indies. In April 1810, while commanding Leopard, he participated in the attack on the Ile de France.

Later in 1810 he was transferred to HMS Scipion. From 1811 to 1817 he served as Commissioner of the Navy in Bombay before being forced to return to Britain because of poor health. He then lived in Paris. He died in London at Menzies' home on 1 April 1823.
