= List of fjords in Canada =

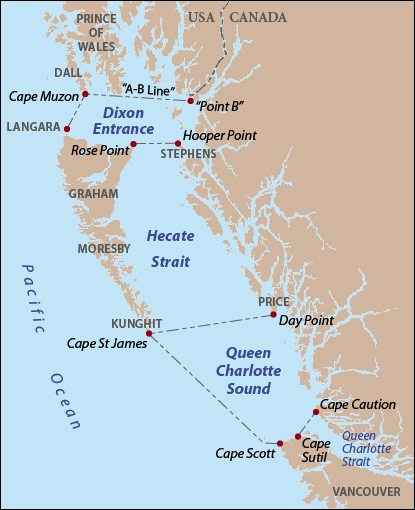
The North Coast of British Columbia is deeply incised by numerous fjords.

Fjords in Canada are long, narrow inlets characterized by steep sides, created in a valley carved by glacial activity. A fjord can have two or more basins separated by sills. The bowls can have a depth of 20 to 500 m (66 to 1,640 ft) and the dividing sills can raise up to a few metres below the water surface. Mountainous glaciated areas in Canada are along the British Columbia Coast - from the Alaskan border along the Portland Canal to Indian Arm. Kingcome Inlet is a typical west coast fjord.

In Newfoundland and Labrador, Saglek Fiord, Nachvak Fiord, and Hebron Fiord, are in Labrador. While Western Brook Pond, Trout River Big Pond, and Bonne Bay in Gros Morne National Park are located along the coastline of the island of Newfoundland.

Quebec's Saguenay River valley contains a fjord. The Saguenay Fjord is 100 km (62 mi) long and 275 m (902 ft) deep.

The Arctic Archipelago features fjords such as those around Ellesmere and Baffin Island, including Alexandra Fiord, Ellesmere Island, and Kangiqtualuk Uqquqti, Baffin Island.

When a portion of the high cliff wall falls off, it may cause a tsunami. This occurred in the early 20th century at Western Brook Pond of Gros Morne National Park when a 30 m (98 ft) tsunami was created after Broke Off Cliff fell.

Fjords listed here may consist of several complex waterways. These waterways may contribute to the length of the fjord. For more information on these please see the main fjord source or Wikipedia article. Some examples are Dean Channel and Douglas Channel. The locality of Hagensborg in the Bella Coola Valley in the Dean Channel fjord was settled by Norwegian immigrants in 1894 as it reminded them of home. The total length of the fjord from the head of Dean Channel to the mouth of Fitz Hugh Sound is about 170 km (110 mi) rivalling Hardangerfjord in Norway for length. The Hardangerfjord, the Queen of fjords, at a length of 179 km (111 mi) is claimed to be fourth largest fjord in the world and second largest of Norway.

Anaktalak Bay, Saglek Fiord and Nachvak Fiord off the coast of Newfoundland and Labrador are being studied for environmental changes due to global warming. Increased tourism and marine traffic, contaminants from air, water or industrial pollution, changing weather patterns are affecting what once had been pristine water basins of the fjords protected by sills.

The use of the word canal to name fjords or inlets on the British Columbian and Southeast Alaskan coast is a legacy of the Spanish expeditions to the Pacific Northwest in the 18th century. For example, Haro Strait between Victoria and the San Juan Islands was originally Canal de Haro. The English cognate to the Spanish canal is "channel", which is found throughout the coast, cf. Dean Channel.

Some fjords on the British Columbian coast have rapids, termed skookumchucks which means strong waters in Chinook Jargon). Skookumchucks are caused by the shallows and narrows near the mouth of a fjord as the water inside the fjord's depths is drawn through, to or from, the more open waters beyond.

The phenomenon of mountain-gap wind or squamish or outflow affects the fjords of Canada and Norway. The outflow winds at the Salt and Bols fjords of Norway and the Howe Sound and Portland Inlet of Canada have been compared. European winds may be termed bora. The cold dry air of the continental interior seeks out the easier passage through the fjord valley creating hurricane-force winds.

According to the definition, fjord, Western Brook Pond and Trout River Big Pond in Newfoundland's Gros Morne National Park, are also often described as a fjords, but are actually freshwater lakes cut off from the sea, so are not fjords in the English sense of the term. Such lakes are sometimes called "fjord lakes". It is of interest to note that Pissing Mare Falls at 350 m (1,150 ft) high, is one of several waterfalls to drain into Western Brook Pond. Along the British Columbia Coast, a notable fjord-lake is Owikeno Lake, which is a freshwater extension of Rivers Inlet.

== List of fjords ==
List of Canadian fjords:
Image	Fjords	Province	Co-ordinates	Comments
	Aarrujaaqtuup Kangiqtua	NU	68°58′17″N 68°32′33″W	Inuktitut syllabics: ᐋᕐᕈᔮᖅᑑᑉ ᑲᖏᖅᑐᐊ, Aarrujaaqtuup Kangiqtua (formerly Pitchforth Fiord)
	Agate Fiord	NU	79°27′00″N 93°00′00″W	
	Akpait Fiord	NU	66°53′19″N 61°53′34″W	
	Aktijartukan Fiord	NU	65°06′00″N 63°55′00″W	
	Alan Reach	BC	53°27′59″N 128°37′20″W	
	Alberni Inlet	BC	49°03′34″N 124°50′57″W	Length 40 km (25 mi)
	Alexandra Fiord	NU	70°54′00″N 76°00′00″W	
	Alice Arm	BC	55°27′03″N 129°35′19″W	
	Alluviaq Fiord	NU	59°29′45″N 65°09′05″W	Alluviaq Fiord / Fjord Alluviaq (formerly Abloviak Bay / Abloviak Fiord / Fjord Abloviak)
	Archer Fiord	NU	81°25′00″N 67°00′00″W	
	Arthur Fiord	NU	76°30′00″N 93°24′00″W	
	Arviqtujuq Kangiqtua	NU	70°42′02″N 69°57′15″W	Arviqtujuq Kangiqtua (formerly Eglinton Fiord)
	Aurland Fiord	NU	81°04′00″N 94°25′00″W	
	Ayles Fiord	NU	82°45′00″N 80°00′00″W	
	Baad Fiord	NU	76°28′00″N 86°30′00″W	
	Baie Wakeham	QC	61°37′30″N 71°59′00″W	Wakeham Bay
	Bals Fiord	NU	80°24′00″N 95°45′00″W	
	Barrie Reach	BC	53°27′36″N 128°15′51″W	
	Baumann Fiord	NU	77°40′00″N 85°35′00″W	
	Bay Fiord	NU	78°55′00″N 83°30′00″W	
	Bears Gut	NL	58°42′37″N 63°00′29″W	
	Beitstad Fiord	NU	79°04′00″N 78°10′00″W	
	Belize Inlet	BC	51°07′52″N 127°16′51″W	A part of the fjord network Seymour-Belize Inlet Complex (SBIC), located on the north coast of British Columbia. Belize Inlet, which is 50 km (31 mi) in length has its own side inlets, narrow waterways named Wentworth Sound and Alison Sound.
	Bentham Fiord	NU	77°08′00″N 80°12′00″W	
	Bird Fiord	NU	77°10′00″N 87°00′00″W	
	Blind Fiord	NU	78°14′00″N 86°16′00″W	
	Blue Fiord	NU	77°16′00″N 87°05′00″W	
	Boas Fiord	NU	66°48′00″N 62°49′00″W	
	Bonne Bay	NL	49°33′12″N 57°55′53″W	There is both Inner Bonne Bay and outer Bonne Bay. Outer Bonne Bay opens up to the entrance of the fjord of Bonne Bay.
	Borup Fiord	NU	80°37′00″N 83°25′00″W	
	Briggs Inlet	BC	52°24′33″N 127°59′31″W	
	Bukken Fiord	NU	80°43′00″N 94°55′00″W	
	Bunde Fiord	NU	80°36′00″N 94°55′00″W	
	Burke Channel	BC	52°09′14″N 127°27′48″W	See also the major inlets of British Columbia coast, and Dean Channel. The fjord region of western mainland British Columbia,... Douglas Channel in the north to Burke Channel and Dean Channel in the south — Batholiths
	Burrard Inlet	BC	49°17′55″N 123°05′07″W	Burrard Inlet is a relatively shallow-sided coastal fjord in southwestern British Columbia. The City of Vancouver and surrounding cities are on the Burrard Inlet. Because of this, the shores of the fjord are heavily populated and the fjord is busy with shipping activity from the Port of Vancouver.
	Bute Inlet	BC	50°39′09″N 124°53′10″W	
	Cambridge Fiord	NU	71°26′00″N 74°45′00″W	
	Cañon Fiord	NU	80°00′00″N 82°35′00″W	
	Cascade Inlet	BC	52°30′04″N 127°31′19″W	
	Chandler Fiord	NU	81°38′00″N 68°46′00″W	
	Chief Mathews Bay	BC	53°21′32″N 128°04′59″W	See also the major inlets of British Columbia coast.
	Clark Fiord	NU	70°58′00″N 72°07′00″W	
	Clearwater Fiord	NU	66°34′00″N 67°27′00″W	
	Confederation Fiord	NU	68°10′00″N 67°19′00″W	
	Conybeare Fiord	NU	81°34′00″N 67°35′00″W	
	Coronation Fiord	NU	67°14′00″N 64°35′00″W	
	Cousins Inlet	BC	52°19′10″N 127°45′05″W	
	d'Iberville Fiord	NU	80°34′00″N 79°00′00″W	
	Dean Channel	BC	52°28′44″N 127°14′22″W	The total length of the fjord from the head of Dean Channel to the mouth of Fitz Hugh Sound is about 170 km (110 mi) rivalling Hardangerfjord in Norway for length.
	Denmark Fiord	NU	70°35′00″N 103°05′00″W	
	Desolation Sound	BC	50°07′20″N 124°45′30″W	See also the major inlets of British Columbia coast, Desolation Sound Marine Provincial Park and Recreation Park.
	Devastation Channel	BC	53°40′09″N 128°50′09″W	
	Dexterity Fiord	NU	71°15′00″N 73°02′00″W	
	Disraeli Fiord	NU	82°49′00″N 73°21′00″W	Disraeli Fiord (formerly Disraeli Bay)
	Douglas Channel	BC	53°40′00″N 129°08′00″W	Length 90 km (56 mi)
	East Fiord	NU	79°24′00″N 93°20′00″W	
	Eids Fiord	NU	77°21′10″N 87°06′00″W	
	Eidsbotn	NU	76°09′55″N 91°00′00″W	
	Ekalugad Fiord	NU	68°46′00″N 68°37′00″W	
	Ekortiarsuk Fiord	NL	59°59′33″N 64°22′23″W	
	Emma Fiord	NU	81°29′00″N 89°00′00″W	
	Ephemeral Cove	NU	63°27′40″N 91°06′40″W	
	Europa Reach	BC	53°26′25″N 128°25′26″W	See also list of rivers of British Columbia and British Columbia Coast
	Exaluin Fiord	NU	65°40′00″N 62°54′00″W	
	Expedition Fiord	NU	79°20′00″N 92°00′00″W	
	Fabricius Fiord	NU	72°22′00″N 84°38′00″W	
	Fisher Channel	BC	52°05′09″N 127°53′16″W	Fisher Channel leads into Dean Channel, and towards Ocean Falls.
	Fitz Hugh Sound	BC	51°40′30″N 127°55′05″W	See also Dean Channel.
	Fjord Alluviaq	QC	59°26′45″N 65°09′58″W	Alluviaq Fiord / Fjord Alluviaq (formerly Abloviak Bay / Abloviak Fiord / Fjord Abloviak)
	Fjord de Salluit	QC	62°12′44″N 75°41′43″W	
	Fjord du Saguenay	QC	48°07′54″N 69°43′36″W	Southernmost fjord in Canada.
	Fjord Qanartalik	QC	61°50′53″N 72°37′41″W	
	Fjord Qasigiarsiti	QC	59°01′34″N 65°43′10″W	
	Fjord Tursukattaq	QC	61°51′07″N 72°43′42″W	
	Foss Fiord	NU	70°22′00″N 87°00′00″W	
	Fram Fiord	NU	76°31′00″N 81°19′00″W	
	Frederick Sound	BC	51°02′10″N 126°43′10″W	The largest branch of Seymour Inlet.
	Gardner Canal	BC	53°26′35″N 128°23′30″W	Technically a side-inlet of the larger Douglas Channel. The Gardner is a principal inlet/fjord of a length 90 km (56 mi).
	Gibbs Fiord	NU	70°49′15″N 71°54′50″W	
	Gibs Fiord	NU	79°53′00″N 87°15′00″W	
	Gifford Fiord	NU	70°10′00″N 82°30′00″W	
	Gilttoyees Inlet	BC	53°50′09″N 128°58′24″W	
	Glacier Fiord	NU	78°22′00″N 89°29′00″W	
	Goose Fiord	NU	76°36′00″N 88°35′00″W	
	Greely Fiord	NU	80°30′00″N 81°40′00″W	
	Grise Fiord	NU	76°35′00″N 83°14′00″W	There is a hamlet of the same name, Grise Fiord on this fiord. Grise Fiord means "pig fiord" and in Inuktitut is named Ausuittuq.
	Haakon Fiord	NU	78°50′00″N 100°45′00″W	
	Harbour Fiord	NU	76°31′00″N 84°08′00″W	
	Hare Fiord	NU	81°01′00″N 85°30′00″W	
	Hastings Arm	BC	55°30′14″N 129°46′04″W	
	Hayes Fiord	NU	79°02′00″N 76°45′00″W	
	Hebron Fiord	NL	58°08′49″N 62°52′50″W	See also Torngat Mountains
	Hotham Sound	BC	49°52′05″N 124°02′23″W	See also the major inlets of British Columbia coast, Nelson Island and St. Vincent Bay.
	Hevenor Inlet; K’t’a’i	BC	53°38′28″N 129°59′17″W	See also Pitt Island
	Howe Sound	BC	49°30′00″N 123°19′00″W	Howe Sound is a roughly triangular-shaped complex of fjords. The scenic Sea-to-Sky Highway runs along the eastern shore of the sound.
	Humber Arm	NL	49°00′07″N 58°05′29″W	
	Ikkudliayuk Fiord	NL	60°04′18″N 64°29′59″W	
	Indian Arm	BC	49°22′37″N 122°52′41″W	Indian Arm Provincial Park protects the area of Indian Arm fjord.
	Ingnit Fiord	NU	65°48′00″N 62°40′00″W	
	Inugsuin Fiord	NU	69°53′40″N 69°15′00″W	
	Iqalualuit Fiord	NU	68°35′00″N 68°35′00″W	
	Iqalujjuaq Fiord	NU	65°40′00″N 65°05′00″W	
	Isortoq Fiord	NU	69°55′00″N 77°05′00″W	Iterungnek Fiord (formerly Jerusalem Bay)
	Iterungnek Fiord	NL	58°15′18″N 62°48′31″W	
	Itirbilung Fiord	NU	69°18′00″N 68°40′00″W	
	Jervis Inlet	BC	49°55′25″N 123°58′27″W	Jervis Inlet is 90 km (56 mi) in length. Between Toba Inlet and Jervis Inlet to its west, however, there is a freshwater fjord, Powell Lake.
	Jokel Fiord	NU	78°52′00″N 78°05′00″W	
	Jugeborg Fiord	NU	81°14′10″N 89°30′00″W	
	Kairolik Fiord	NU	65°31′00″N 63°31′00″W	
	Kangalaksiorvik Fiord	NL	59°24′05″N 63°56′27″W	
	Kangerk Fiord	NU	66°23′00″N 67°18′00″W	
	Kangilo Fiord	NU	66°18′00″N 67°36′00″W	
	Kangiqhuk	NU	69°06′23″N 105°09′26″W	Kangiqhuk (formerly West Arm)
	Kangiqtualuk Agguqti	NU	70°30′46″N 71°37′55″W	Kangiqtualuk Agguqti (formerly Walker Arm)
	Kangiqtualuk Uqquqti	NU	70°43′51″N 70°43′53″W	Kangiqtualuk Uqquqti (formerly Sam Ford Fiord)
	Kangiqtugaapik	NU	70°14′37″N 68°57′37″W	Kangiqtugaapik (formerly Clyde Inlet)
	Kangiqtugaapiruluk	NU	67°05′37″N 63°34′18″W	Inuktitut syllabics: ᑲᖏᖅᑐᒑᐱᕈᓗᒃ, Kangiqtugaapiruluk (formerly Kangert Fiord)
	Kangiqturuluk	NU	68°37′55″N 68°39′09″W	Inuktitut syllabics: ᑲᖏᖅᑐᕈᓗᒃ, Kangiqturuluk (formerly Kangok Fiord)
	Kangirlugag Fiord	NU	68°48′00″N 68°10′00″W	
	Kangirtukutaaruluq Fiord	NU	67°41′40″N 64°29′10″W	
	Khutzeymateen Inlet	BC	54°39′43″N 130°04′18″W	
	Kiltuish Inlet	BC	53°21′57″N 128°29′39″W	
	Kingcome Inlet	BC	50°57′00″N 126°12′00″W	A lesser principal fjord of the British Columbia Coast.
	Kingnait Fiord	NU	66°02′45″N 64°57′30″W	
	Kingnelling Fiord	NU	67°27′10″N 64°15′20″W	
	Kitimat Arm	BC	53°52′37″N 128°45′44″W	See also Douglas Channel and Kitimat River.
	Knight Inlet	BC	50°41′01″N 125°52′29″W	Knight Inlet is one of the longest great saltwater inlets/fjords on the BC Coast at c. 125 km (78 mi) in length; it is about 2.5 km (1.6 mi) in average width.
	Komaktorvik Fiord	NL	59°17′01″N 63°43′57″W	
	Kulutingwak Fiord	NU	82°07′00″N 82°48′00″W	
	Kumlien Fiord	NU	65°24′00″N 64°45′00″W	Kumlien Fiord (formerly Kumlein Fiord)
	Kwatna Inlet	BC	52°05′34″N 127°27′45″W	See also Dean Channel.
	Kyuquot Sound	BC	50°03′00″N 127°15′00″W	
	Labouchere Channel	BC	52°23′36″N 127°12′54″W	See also North Bentinck Arm, King Island, and Dean Channel.
	Li Fiord	NU	80°05′00″N 95°25′00″W	
	Livingstone Fiord	NU	66°03′00″N 67°45′00″W	
	Loughborough Inlet	BC	50°34′45″N 125°32′28″W	Loughborough Inlet is a lesser principal inlet/fjord with a length of 35 km (22 mi) and a width of 2.5 km (1.6 mi).
	Louise Fiord	NU	78°58′00″N 102°36′00″W	
	Maktak Fiord	NU	67°18′45″N 64°22′45″W	
	Markham Fiord	NU	82°58′50″N 71°28′00″W	
	Maujatuuq Fiord	NU	67°43′50″N 64°48′50″W	
	McBeth Fiord	NU	69°32′20″N 69°10′00″W	McBeth Fiord (formerly Ijellirtung Fiord)
	Mermaid Fiord	NU	66°14′00″N 62°44′00″W	
	Middle Fiord	NU	79°37′00″N 95°00′00″W	
	Milne Fiord	NU	82°38′00″N 81°27′00″W	
	Mokka Fiord	NU	79°35′00″N 87°15′00″W	
	Mooneshine Fiord	NU	66°25′00″N 61°47′00″W	
	Muskox Fiord	NU	76°30′00″N 87°27′00″W	
	Nachvak Fiord	NL	59°02′09″N 63°44′52″W	
	Najjuttuuq Fiord	NU	68°49′20″N 69°16′35″W	
	Nallulik Fiord	NU	69°13′00″N 68°45′00″W	
	Nallussiaq Fiord	NU	65°39′00″N 63°33′00″W	
	Narpaing Fiord	NU	67°48′00″N 65°33′00″W	
	Narrows Inlet	BC	49°42′40″N 123°46′47″W	Narrows Inlet (formerly Narrows Arm)
	Nass Bay	BC	54°59′23″N 129°59′54″W	
	Nedlukseak Fiord	NU	67°55′00″N 66°22′00″W	
	Nenahlmai Lagoon	BC	50°58′46″N 127°12′15″W	
	Nettilling Fiord	NU	66°02′00″N 68°12′00″W	
	Newton Fiord	NU	63°05′00″N 66°08′00″W	
	Noodleook Fiord	NL	59°55′51″N 64°24′12″W	
	North Bentinck Arm	BC	52°21′40″N 126°53′33″W	See also South Bentinck Arm. North Bentinck Arm is a deep fjord which runs about 15 km (9.3 mi) in length and is about 2.3 km (1.4 mi) in width. The fjord has a depth of between 200 and 400 m (660 and 1,310 ft).
	North Fiord	NU	79°56′00″N 96°25′00″W	
	North Pangnirtung Fiord	NU	67°09′00″N 64°17′00″W	
	Nudlung Fiord	NU	68°21′00″N 67°27′00″W	
	Nugent Sound	BC	51°05′20″N 127°18′15″W	Located between Belize Inlet and Seymour Inlet.
	Nyeboe Fiord	NU	70°25′00″N 86°30′00″W	
	Observatory Inlet	BC	55°17′25″N 129°46′59″W	Northward extension of Portland Inlet
	Otto Fiord	NU	81°02′00″N 87°00′00″W	
	Owikeno Lake	BC	51°40′07″N 126°49′45″W	
	Padle Fiord	NU	66°55′00″N 63°25′00″W	
	Pangnirtung Fiord	NU	66°12′13″N 65°37′35″W	
	Pearse Canal	BC	54°53′54″N 130°23′33″W	Pearse Canal forms the border between British Columbia and the southernmost point of the Alaska Panhandle.
	Portland Canal	BC	55°27′00″N 130°02′00″W	Portland Canal is 114.6 km (71.2 mi) in length.
	Portland Inlet	BC	54°50′51″N 130°12′55″W	Portland Inlet is 40 km (25 mi) long and as much as 13 km (8.1 mi) wide.
	Prince of Wales Reach	BC	49°54′16″N 123°54′47″W	The Prince of Wales Reach has a length of 40 km (25 mi), a depth of 670 m (2,200 ft) and reaches the first arm of Jervis Inlet.
	Prince Rupert Harbour	BC	54°20′25″N 130°17′15″W	The immense, Prince Rupert Harbour, operated by the Prince Rupert Port Authority, is a complex of basins or channel waterways and sills. In alphabetical order the channels, and their respective sills are: Fern Passage (29 m [95 ft], surrounded by sills of 7 m [23 ft] and 2.1 m [6 ft 11 in]); Kloiya Bay (23.5 m [77 ft] depth, Denise Inlet 39 m [128 ft]); Morse Basin (7 m [23 ft] depth, silled off); Porpoise Channel (51 m [167 ft] depth across Flora Bank, 20 m [66 ft] outside sill); Porpoise Harbour (25 m [82 ft]) depth; Prince Rupert Main Harbour (91 m [299 ft] depth, with three entrance sills -each 38 m [125 ft]); Tuck Inlet, is "silled-off" fjord (80 m [260 ft] depth, with entrance sill of 10.5 m [34 ft]); Upper Harbour (60 m [200 ft] depth, with entrance sill of 45 m [148 ft]); Venn Passage around the north end of Digby Island (22 m [72 ft] depth contained by several wide sills of 4.9 m [16 ft], 3 m [9.8 ft], 6.4 m [21 ft] and 6.1 m [20 ft]); Wainwright Basin (5.7 m [19 ft], with sills of 3.7 m [12 ft], 9.1 m [30 ft] and 0.9 m [2 ft 11 in]).
	Princess Louisa Inlet	BC	50°11′05″N 123°48′11″W	Princess Louisa Inlet is at the north east end of Jervis Inlet, and the east side of Queens Reach, and has a length of 6 km (3.7 mi), a width of 0.8 km (0.50 mi) and a depth of 179 m (587 ft).
	Princess Royal Reach	BC	50°02′13″N 123°52′08″W	Princess Royal Reach is the second arm of the Jervis Inlet, between Queens Reach and Prince of Wales Reach, and has a length of 33 km (21 mi) and a maximum depth of 552 m (1,811 ft).
	Ptarmigan Fiord	NU	64°47′00″N 66°07′00″W	
	Qarmaarjuit	NU	63°59′00″N 72°40′00″W	Inuktitut syllabics: ᖃᕐᒫᕐᔪᐃᑦ, Qarmaarjuit (Formerly Amadjuak Bay)
	Quajon Fiord	NU	67°42′00″N 65°10′00″W	
	Quatsino Sound	BC	50°30′30″N 127°42′00″W	Quatsino Sound is one of five sounds that pierce the west coast of Vancouver Island.
	Queen Charlotte Strait	BC	50°02′13″N 123°52′08″W	See also the major inlets of British Columbia coast.
	Queens Reach	BC	50°50′16″N 127°21′29″W	Queens Reach is the last arm of Jervis Inlet, and is 34 km (21 mi) long and 457 m (1,499 ft) deep.
	Quernbiter Fiord	NU	71°36′00″N 75°02′00″W	
	Rens Fiord	NU	81°10′00″N 93°40′00″W	
	Rivers Inlet	BC	49°13′06″N 122°50′39″W	The entrance to Rivers Inlet is from Dean Channel near that fjord's mouth. It is about 45 km (28 mi) in length.
	Rocknoser Fiord	NU	68°53′00″N 68°15′00″W	
	Roscoe Inlet	BC	52°24′14″N 127°53′37″W	
	Royal Society Fiord	NU	71°24′00″N 74°00′00″W	
	Saanich Inlet	BC	48°37′33″N 123°30′26″W	Saanich Inlet is 24 km (15 mi) long, has a surface area of 65 km^{2} (25 sq mi), and its maximum depth is 225 m (738 ft).
	Saglek Fiord	NL	58°28′46″N 63°14′03″W	
	Sakiak Fiord	NU	65°42′00″N 62°45′00″W	
	Salmon Inlet	BC	49°38′46″N 123°41′19″W	Salmon Inlet (formerly Salmon Arm)
	Sarvalik	NU	68°51′36″N 69°13′48″W	Inuktitut syllabics: ᓴᕐᕙᓕᒃ, Sarvalik (formerly Sarvalik Fiord)
	Sechelt Inlet	BC	49°37′46″N 123°45′46″W	Sechelt Inlet is one of the principal inlets/fjords along the British Columbia Coast comprising Narrows Inlet and Salmon Inlet. Sechelt Inlet (formerly Seechelt Inlet)
	Seton Lake	BC	50°41′17″N 122°07′35″W	
	Seymour Inlet	BC	51°03′57″N 126°59′14″W	A part of the fjord network, Seymour-Belize Inlet Complex (SBIC), located on the north coast of British Columbia. Seymour Inlet is one of the lesser travelled of the principal inlets/fjords of the British Columbia Coast and the main arm is 75 km (47 mi) long.
	Shark Fiord	NU	66°33′00″N 66°55′00″W	
	Skaare Fiord	NU	78°51′00″N 88°05′00″W	
	Skookumchuck Narrows	BC	49°44′51″N 123°54′28″W	Skookumchuck Narrows forms the entrance of Sechelt Inlet
	Slidre Fiord	NU	80°00′00″N 86°15′00″W	
	Smith Inlet	BC	51°18′02″N 127°17′07″W	
	Sor Fiord	NU	77°20′00″N 84°40′00″W	
	South Bentinck Arm	BC	52°08′59″N 126°49′41″W	
	South Cape Fiord	NU	76°26′00″N 84°53′00″W	
	South Fiord	NU	79°20′00″N 94°25′00″W	
	Southwind Fiord	NU	66°50′00″N 62°25′00″W	
	Starnes Fiord	NU	76°37′00″N 82°10′00″W	
	Stenkul Fiord	NU	77°25′00″N 83°54′00″W	
	Strand Fiord	NU	79°11′00″N 91°28′00″W	
	Strathcona Fiord	NU	78°43′00″N 82°55′00″W	
	Sunneshine Fiord	NU	66°37′00″N 61°48′00″W	
	Surprise Fiord	NU	78°15′00″N 90°00′00″W	
	Svarte Fiord	NU	77°40′00″N 84°36′00″W	
	Tanquary Fiord	NU	81°05′00″N 78°45′00″W	A part of the Quttinirpaaq National Park of Canada
	Tasialuk	NU	70°25′33″N 70°07′01″W	Structurally a fjord, part of Baffin Island's northeastern coast fjord system. Tasialuk (formerly Ayr Lake).
	Tawsig Fiord	NU	64°47′00″N 65°57′00″W	
	Telegraph Passage	BC	54°02′17″N 130°07′05″W	
	Tellialuk Fiord	NL	59°59′52″N 64°29′35″W	
	Telliaosilk Fiord	NL	59°59′59″N 64°16′38″W	
	Tingin Fiord	NU	69°09′00″N 68°40′00″W	
	Toba Inlet	BC	50°24′39″N 124°36′14″W	Toba Inlet is one of the lesser of the principal inlets/fjords of the British Columbia Coast amidst the Coast Mountain Range. Between Toba Inlet and Jervis Inlet to its west, however, there is a freshwater fjord, Powell Lake
	Touak Fiord	NU	65°47′20″N 63°23′25″W	
	Trold Fiord	NU	78°15′00″N 85°17′00″W	
	Troll Fiord	NU	77°54′00″N 84°55′00″W	
	Tromso Fiord	NU	71°12′00″N 73°40′00″W	
	Trout River Big Pond	NL	49°24′19″N 58°02′11″W	
	Trout Trap Fiord	NL	59°13′41″N 63°33′03″W	
	Ugjuktok Fiord	NL	58°22′28″N 63°25′57″W	
	Uivvaruluup Kangiqtuttaivanga	NU	67°15′57″N 63°12′49″W	Inuktitut syllabics: ᐅᐃᕝᕙᕈᓘᑉ ᑲᖏᖅᑐᑦᑕᐃᕙᖓ
	Ujuktuk Fiord	NU	65°13′00″N 64°26′00″W	
	Ursula Channel	BC	53°25′02″N 128°54′46″W	
	Vendom Fiord	NU	77°45′00″N 83°00′00″W	
	Verney Passage	BC	53°30′19″N 129°04′23″W	
	Vesle Fiord	NU	79°08′00″N 84°00′00″W	
	Viks Fiord	NU	75°59′20″N 90°35′00″W	
	Wakeman Sound	BC	50°59′05″N 126°30′55″W	
	Walrus Fiord	NU	76°30′00″N 88°45′00″W	
	West Cape Fiord	NU	80°12′00″N 95°30′00″W	
	West Fiord	NU	76°06′00″N 90°00′00″W	
	Western Brook Pond	NL	49°46′08″N 57°49′14″W	Western Brook Pond, at 16 km (9.9 mi) in length, is a fjord or lake located in Gros Morne National Park amidst the Long Range Mountains, in the Appalachian Mountains range.
	Whidbey Reach	BC	53°20′37″N 127°59′36″W	Part of Gardner Canal, located near its eastern end, between Barrie Reach and Egeria Reach portions of Gardner Canal
	Wolf Fiord	NU	78°25′00″N 88°30′00″W	
	Work Channel	BC	54°29′03″N 130°13′13″W	Work Channel (formerly Wark Channel)

== See also ==
- List of fjords of the United States
