= Vancouver Expedition =

1791–95 British sea voyage exploring the West Coasts of North America and Australia

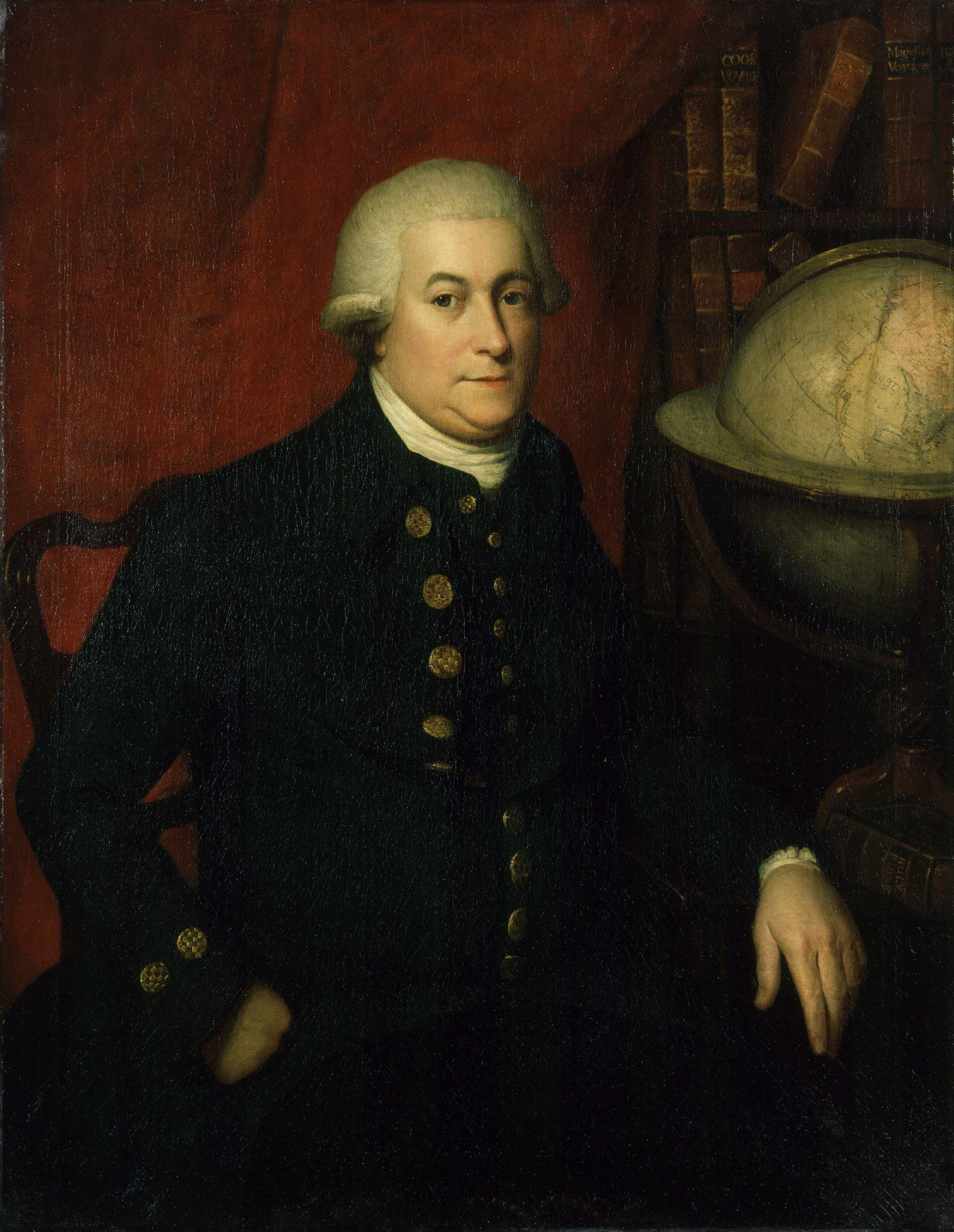
A likely portrait of George Vancouver, c. 1798, in the National Portrait Gallery, London

The Vancouver Expedition (1791–1795) was a four-and-a-half-year voyage of exploration and diplomacy, commanded by Captain George Vancouver of the Royal Navy. The British expedition circumnavigated the globe and made contact with five continents. The expedition at various times included between two and four vessels, and up to 153 men, all but 6 of whom returned home safely.

== Origin ==
Several previous voyages of exploration including those of Ferdinand Magellan and James Cook, and the Spanish Manila-Acapulco galleons trade route active since 1565, had established the strategic and commercial value of exploring and claiming the Pacific Ocean access, both for its wealth in whales and furs and as a trade route to the Orient. Britain was especially interested in improving its knowledge of the Southern Pacific whale fisheries, and in particular the locations of the strategically positioned Australia, New Zealand, the legendary (and non-existent) Isla Grande, and the Northwest Passage. A new ship was purchased, fitted out, and named HMS Discovery after one of Cook's ships. Her captain was Henry Roberts and Vancouver his 1st Lieutenant.

Plans changed when the adventurer John Meares reported that the Spanish had impounded his ship and seized hundreds of thousands of pounds' worth of goods at Nootka Sound. Although it is now known that his claims of loss were somewhat exaggerated, Britain had recently waged war against Spain and seemed ready to resume hostilities; the Parliament readied the fleet in the Nootka Crisis. Roberts and Vancouver left Discovery to serve in the Channel Fleet while Discovery became a depot ship for processing those taken in by the press gang. The Spanish backed down from their earlier stance in the Nootka Sound Convention, whose terms resulted in inconsistent instructions for the British and Spanish officers sent to implement them.

Vancouver returned to Discovery as the expedition's commander. Vancouver understood from the discussions he had with ministers and officials in London prior to his departure that his task was to receive back from the Spanish commander at Nootka Sound land and property confiscated from the British fur traders in July 1789 and to establish a formal British presence there to support and promote the fur trade. Proposals to establish a British settlement on the Northwest Coast had been discussed in commercial and official circles in the 1780s, encouraged by the success of the similar project at Botany Bay and Norfolk Island. During the war scare with Spain that resulted from the arrest of the British fur traders at Nootka Sound, plans were made for a small party of convicts and marines to be sent from New South Wales to make a subsidiary settlement on the Northwest Coast: one of the ships to be used for this task was to have been the Discovery, which Vancouver afterwards commanded during his expedition. He believed that once he had accepted restitution of Nootka Sound and its associated territory he was to make preparations for founding a British colony there that, at least initially, would have had a close connection with the New South Wales colony. Supplies and materials for establishing the colony were sent on the Daedalus storeship. He was also instructed "to receive back in form a restitution of the territories on which the Spaniards had seized, and also to make an accurate survey of the coast, from the 30th degree of north latitude northwestward toward Cook's River; and further, to obtain every possible information that could be collected respecting the natural and political state of that country." These explorations were in part to discover water communication into the North American interior (whether a Northwest Passage or, more likely, navigable rivers existed) and to facilitate the research of the expedition's politically well-connected botanist, Archibald Menzies. A change to a more conciliatory British policy toward Spain after he left England in April 1791, a result of challenges arising from the French Revolution, was not communicated to Vancouver, leaving him in an embarrassing situation in his negotiations with the Spanish commander at Nootka. Although Vancouver and Bodega y Quadra were friendly with one another, their negotiations did not go smoothly. Spain desired to set the Spanish-British boundary at the Strait of Juan de Fuca, but Vancouver insisted on British rights to the Columbia River. Vancouver also objected to the new Spanish post at Neah Bay. Bodega y Quadra insisted on Spain retaining Nootka Sound, which Vancouver could not accept. In the end the two agreed to refer the matter to their respective governments.

Following the Mutiny on the Bounty, the Admiralty had ordered the precaution that ships not make such long voyages alone; therefore the armed tender HMS Chatham was assigned to the expedition. The chartered merchant ship, Daedalus, would rendezvous at Nootka Sound a year later with supplies. The expedition was supposed to take two or three years.

=== The Muster ===
The Muster of the expedition lists 153 men. Most were naval officers or sailors, many of whom would distinguish themselves in future service, including Peter Puget, Joseph Baker, Joseph Whidbey, William Broughton, Zachary Mudge, Thomas Manby, and Robert Barrie. There was a large detachment of Marines; whether these were to assist with exploration in hostile territory or to discourage mutiny is not recorded. Two 16-year-old aristocrats, the Honorable Thomas Pitt (nephew of the British Prime Minister, William Pitt The Younger) and the Honorable Charles Stuart (son of a Marquis), were brought aboard as able seamen; they proved troublesome.

Among the supernumeraries were Menzies (who kept a meticulous journal of the expedition) and his servant John Ewin (or Ewing). A Hawaiian man named Towereroo, whom Captain Charles Duncan had brought to England, was put on Discovery that he might return home. Finally, the Muster includes a widow's man, rated able seaman, but in fact merely an accounting fiction.

== 1791 ==
On 1 April 1791, Discovery and Chatham set sail from Falmouth, England. They reached Santa Cruz in Tenerife on 28 April; this was intended as a rest stop and opportunity to study the botany of the region, but ended in a drunken brawl in which several members of the crew were thrown into the bay or suffered injuries.

On 7 May, the two ships left Tenerife; Chatham arrived at Cape Town on 6 June and Discovery two days later. After more botanizing, socializing, and recruiting replacements for deserters, the ships left on 17 August. The surgeon took ill during an outbreak of dysentery (one sailor died); Menzies assumed his duties for the rest of the expedition.

On 29 September, they landed in Australia, at what Vancouver named King George the Third's Sound. They quickly surveyed the south coast of Australia and landed at Dusky Sound, New Zealand on 2 November for resupplying and botanising, before departing on 21 November. The ships proceeding separately, both discovered the sub-Antarctic Snares Islands (23 November) which Vancouver considered a severe shipping hazard (hence, the name). En route to Tahiti, the crew of Chatham furthermore discovered the Chatham Islands (29 November) before reaching Tahiti on 26 December; Discovery meanwhile discovered Rapa Iti (which Vancouver called "Oparo") and arrived at Tahiti on 30 December.

Putting in at Tahiti, Vancouver enforced rigid discipline to avoid the personal connections that had led to a mutiny on the Bounty. Pitt was flogged for exchanging a piece of ship's iron for the romantic favours of a lady. Towereroo, not subject to such discipline, decided he preferred the comforts of Tahiti and had to be made to leave.

== 1792 ==
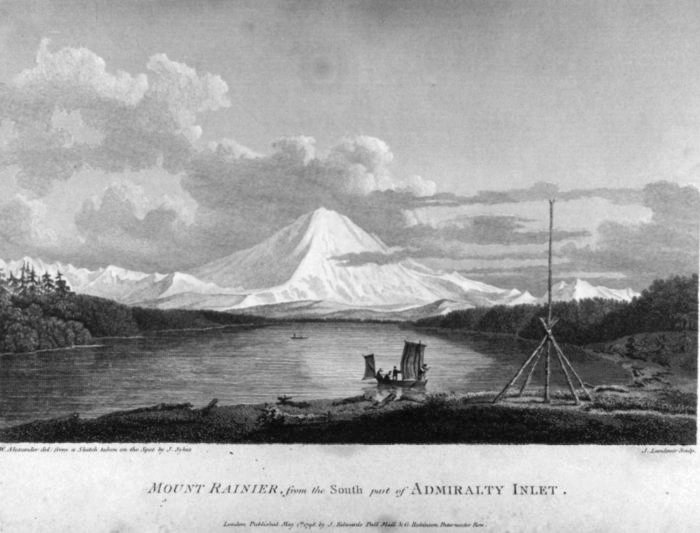
"Mount Rainier from the south Part of Admiralty Inlet". The mountain was first sighted by Vancouver during his exploration of Puget Sound in the spring of 1792.

Proceeding to winter in Hawaiʻi, Vancouver arrived in March 1792. He had been a young midshipman on Cook's fatal landing 13 years earlier, so avoided coming ashore at Kealakekua Bay. He was disturbed by the frequent request for firearms, and tried to avoid escalating the ongoing civil war, spending the winter in Oʻahu, where, however, three of his men were killed in a skirmish (or possibly following it; taken to Puʻu o Mahuka Heiau to be ritually sacrificed). He made arrangements for his tiny fleet to winter and re-supply in Hawaiʻi for the duration of the expedition.

Discovery and Chatham proceeded to North America. On 16 April they made landfall at about 39°N and started a detailed survey northward. On 28 April, they encountered the American Captain Gray of the Columbia Rediviva with which they had a fruitful sharing of information; much of what Meares had told them about Gray's explorations, the latter said, was fiction.

In June 1792, Discovery and Lieutenant Broughton's Chatham lay anchored in a bay they named Birch Bay. Historians believe that HMS Chatham lost a 900 lb. anchor off Whidbey Island on 9 June 1792. In June 2014, an anchor was raised and will be assessed to see if it is actually the sole remaining relic of Vancouver's 1792 voyage into Puget Sound.

In the expectation of receiving from the Spanish at Nootka Sound title to a large tract of the coast and of forming a settlement to sustain the fur traders, on 4 June 1792, the King's Birthday, at Admiralty Inlet (the entrance to Puget Sound) Vancouver took formal possession, near Possession Point at the southern end of Whidbey Island, of all the coast and hinterland contiguous to the Strait of Juan de Fuca, including Puget Sound, under the name of New Georgia.

Vancouver had decided to use his ships' small boats for the detailed exploration and surveying of the region's complex and sometimes shallow waterways. On 12 June, Vancouver, along with Puget and some of the crew, sailed north from Birch Bay in Discovery's two smaller sailing yawls. In four days they found and charted a number of points and inlets, such as Point Roberts, Point Grey, Burrard Inlet, Howe Sound, and the Jervis Inlet. On 13 June, near Point Roberts, Chatham encountered the Sutil and Mexicana, of the Spanish exploring expedition.

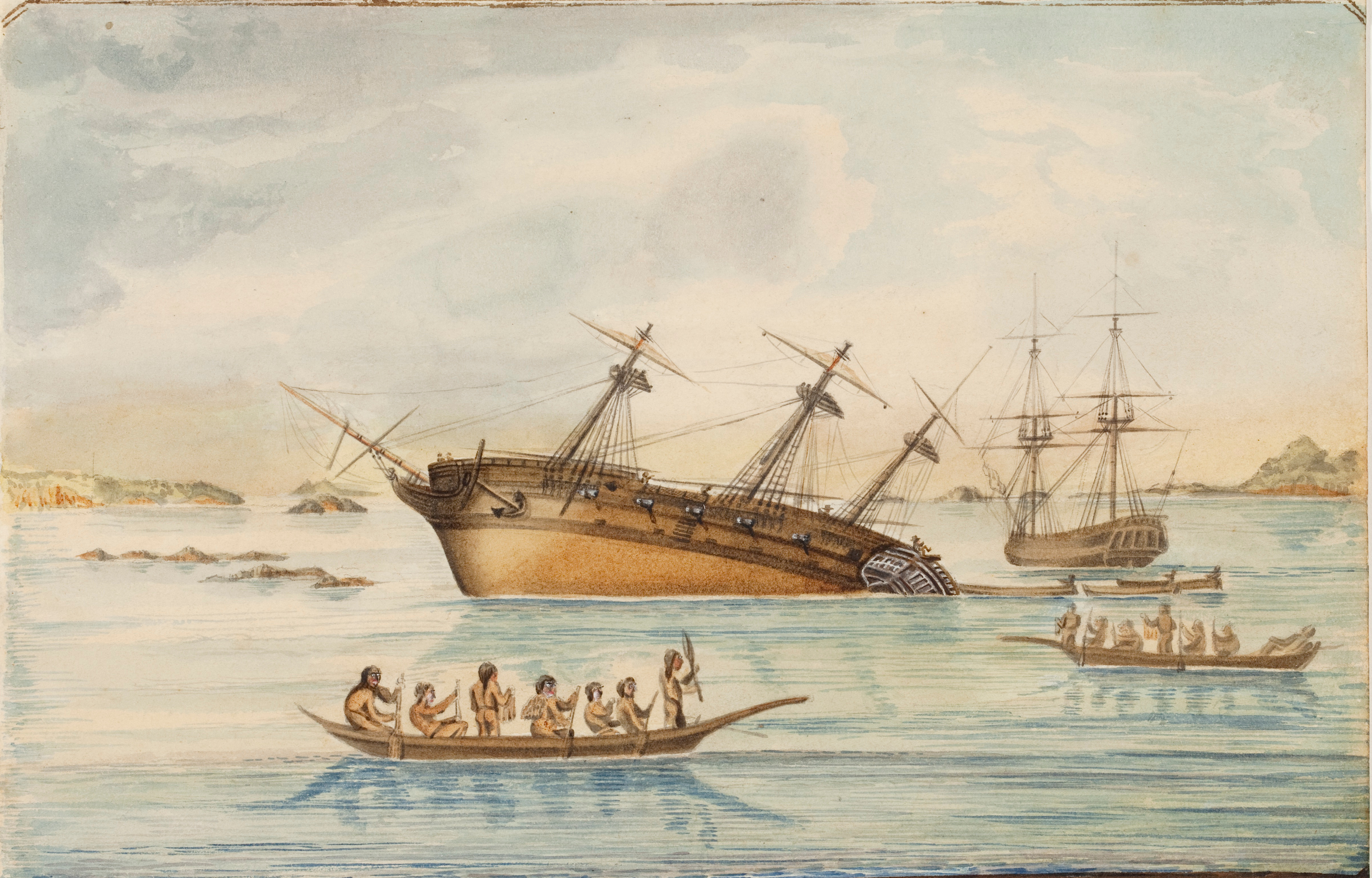
The Discovery ran aground in early August 1792 on hidden rocks in Queen Charlotte Strait near Fife Sound. Within a day the Chatham (in the background at right) also ran aground on rocks about two miles away.

On 21 June 1792, dealing with poor weather and dwindling food supplies, Vancouver decided to head back to HMS Discovery some 84 miles away; on their return they encountered the Spanish ships under the respective commands of Capt. Galiano and Valdés (whom Lt. Broughton had already met), near present-day Vancouver, British Columbia. Both were exploring and mapping the Strait of Georgia, seeking a possible Northwest Passage and a determination of whether Vancouver Island was an island or part of the mainland. The two commanders established a friendly relationship and agreed to assist one another by dividing up the surveying work and sharing charts. They worked together in this way until 13 July, after which each resumed circumnavigating Vancouver Island separately. Galiano's ships reached Nootka Sound, completing the circuit, on 31 August. Vancouver's ships had arrived earlier. Thus Vancouver was the first European to prove the insularity of Vancouver Island (Meares' claims on the matter having been ignored), while Galiano was the first to circumnavigate it. Vancouver had not set out from Nootka but rather began at the Strait of Juan de Fuca, while Galiano began his circumnavigation at Nootka.

In August, while Vancouver was exploring in small boats to the north, Daedalus arrived in Nootka Sound and dispatched the brig HMS Venus with the news that her Captain, Richard Hergest, and William Gooch, sent as astronomer for the expedition, had been murdered on Oahu. Vancouver and Whidbey shared astronomer duties, which later led to friction over pay. On 11 August, the expedition sailed south, reaching Nootka Sound on 28 August, where they exchanged friendly 13-gun salutes with a Spanish frigate commanded by Juan Francisco de la Bodega y Quadra.

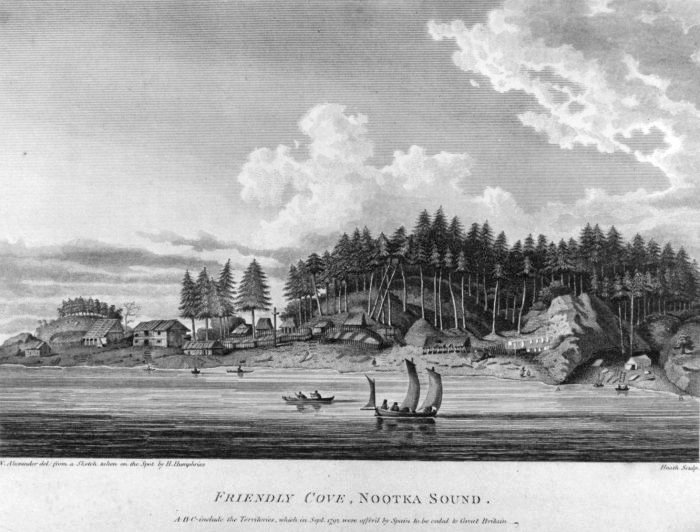
Friendly Cove, Nootka Sound. Volume I, plate VII from: "A Voyage of Discovery to the North Pacific Ocean and Round the World" by George Vancouver.

Relations between Bodega y Quadra and Vancouver were very cordial and even friendly, but they could not reconcile their conflicting instructions and interpretations of the Nootka Convention. They agreed to meet again at the Royal Presidio of Monterey, California. On 21 September Bodega y Quadra left Nootka Sound and Salvador Fidalgo became the commandant of the establishment there. Vancouver sent Lieutenant Mudge back to England on the Portuguese-flagged merchantman Fenis and St. Joseph to get further instructions.

The captain of the trading ship Jenny asked Vancouver to return two Hawaiians to Hawaiʻi. Thus enlarged, the expedition moved south; Whidbey in Daedalus surveying Grays Harbor while the other two ships dared the bar of the Columbia River. The smaller Chatham made it over the bar and sent small boats upriver. Discovery, whose crew was beginning to suffer from scurvy, proceeded to northern Spanish Las Californias province, reaching the Golden Gate and the Royal Presidio of San Francisco on 14 November to a friendly and helpful reception from the Spanish. The other ships arrived by the 26th. Vancouver sailed south along the coast of Alta California, visiting Chumash villages at Point Conception and near Mission San Buenaventura.

Bodega y Quadra offered to facilitate another message via New Spain (Mexico) and the Atlantic route, however Vancouver sent Lt. Broughton. Puget took his place as HMS Chatham's commander, angering Menzies who preferred his friend James Johnstone, sailing master of Chatham.

After resting and reprovisioning, the expedition returned to Hawaiʻi to winter.

== 1793 ==
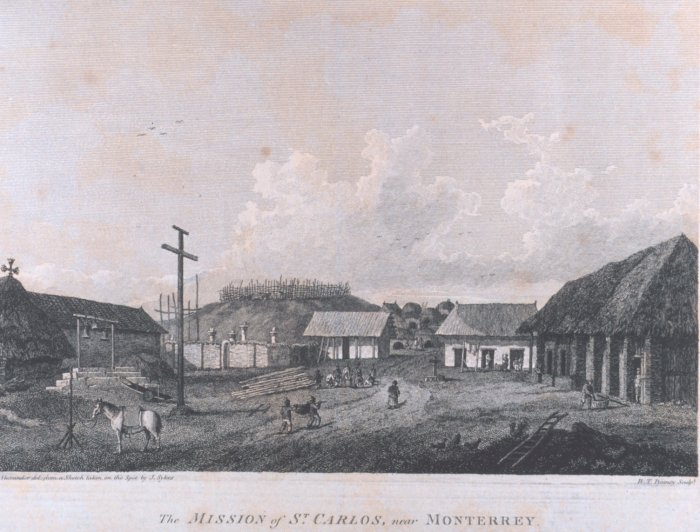
"The Mission of St. Carlos near Monterrey". Vancouver travelled overland to visit the mission in Dec. 1792.

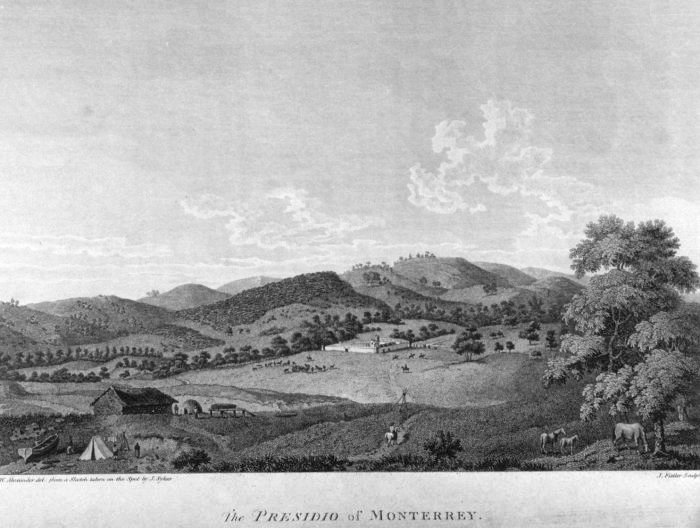
"The Presidio of Monterrey". Vancouver's ships anchored off Monterey three times (Nov–Dec. 1792, Oct–Nov. 1793, and Nov–Dec. 1794), visiting the mission and presidio (shown here).

During their winter in Hawaii, the Discovery sailed around the north side of the Island of Hawaiʻi, and the Chatham the south, meeting at Kealakekua Bay. Vancouver left some cattle, sheep, and more plants that Menzies had collected in California. He met the former British sailor John Young, now an advisor to Kamehameha who acted as an interpreter and helped negotiate with King Kamehameha (I). Vancouver conducted surveys of the islands while Menzies collected specimens.

Over the winter, Vancouver ordered numerous improvements to the small boats that did the detailed survey work, to provide better shelter and supplies for the crew. These improvements would enable the crews to continue their survey of one of the most complex coasts in the world, proceeding as far north as 56°30'N on the west coast of North America, exploring until weather ended their 1793 survey season.

They reached Fitz Hugh Sound on 26 May, arriving at what Vancouver named Restoration Cove two days later. Vancouver, with two of the boats, explored Cascade, Cousins and Roscoe Inlets and Fisher and Dean Channels, while Johnstone explored Burke Channel and North and South Bentinck Arms. The former, in passing the north point of what he named King Island, proved its insular nature. The day before leaving Restoration Cove (10 June), Johnstone was again sent out to explore. The ships meanwhile sailed to the rendezvous east of Yeo Island, where Johnstone met them on 18 June, having explored Spiller and Mussel Inlets and Bullock, Spiller, Mathieson, and Finlayson Channels—in doing so sailing around Yeo, Pooley, Roderick, Susan, and Dowager Islands.

They left their anchorage on 19 June, proceeding up Finlayson and Princess Royal Channels along the east side of Princess Royal Island, anchoring two-thirds up its east coast two days later. From here, Johnstone and Barrie were dispatched to the north, returning on the 29th. They explored the northern reaches of Princess Royal Channel, as well as Whale and Squally Channels, circumnavigating Gil Island in the process—named by Jacinto Caamaño the previous year. The day after their return they sailed out of their cove to another one further north, where they awaited Whidbey's return, who had been sent out to survey the continental shore a day after Johnstone and Barrie. He returned 3 July, having circumnavigated what was named "Hawkesbury's Island" (which was really four islands: Gribbell, Loretta, Hawkesbury, and Maitland Islands) and explored Gardner Canal, Ursula, Devastation and Douglas Channels and Kitimat and Kildala Arms.

After dispatching Whidbey and Barrie to the north, the ships anchored off the north coast of Gil Island. They returned on the 15th, after having explored Gilttoyees Inlet and the length of Grenville Channel to the northwest point of Porcher Island. The same day the ships left, sailing up Principe Channel between Banks and Pitt Islands. On the 21st they were hit by a storm, only being saved by the timely arrival of a whaleboat sent out from the Butterworth of London, under William Brown, whose merchant squadron was safely anchored off the north coast of Stephens Island. From Brown they learned of a "large opening" to the north (Clarence Strait), which he had earlier investigated. With this news, the ships left the next day, reaching Salmon Cove, on the west side of Observatory Inlet, two days later. The same day (24 July), Johnstone and Barrie were sent out; the following day Vancouver left. While Vancouver explored to the heads of Portland Canal, Fillmore and Nakat Inlets, and Boca de Quadra and circumnavigated Revillagigedo Island (during which he was attacked by Tlingit near what was named Escape Point, having two of his men injured), Johnstone and Barrie explored the channels to the southeast, including Work Channel and Khutzeymateen and Quottoon Inlets.

They left Salmon Cove on 18 August, arriving in Port Stewart, just to the west of Revillagigedo Island, a few days later. From here, Johnstone went to the north, circumnavigating what was named "Duke of York's Island" (in reality three islands: Wrangell, Zarembo, and Etolin Islands), as well as sighting Mitkof Island and exploring to the head of Duncan Canal. On 6 September, a few days after his return, they weighed anchor, sailing to what was named Port Protection, on the northwest coast of Prince of Wales Island—which they reached a couple days later. The boats were once again sent out: Johnstone charted the south coast of Kupreanof Island, while Whidbey explored the southeast part of Kuiu Island, reaching the head of Affleck Canal. The latter returned on 21 September; the ships left Port Protection the next day.

Again, the expedition visited Nootka Sound (where there was no resolution of the conflicting orders), Spanish Alta California, and Hawaiʻi.

== 1794 ==
During the expedition's final winter in Hawaiʻi, Baker accompanied Menzies, Midshipman George McKenzie and another man whose name is not recorded, on the first recorded ascent of Mauna Loa. They summited on 16 February and, using a barometer, measured its height to within 50 feet of the modernly accepted value.

Vancouver continued to negotiate with Kamehameha; on 25 February, the King made a formal proclamation of accession, declaring that they were "Tanata no Britanee" (People of Britain). Historians have argued that the Hawaiians regarded the agreement as the establishment of a protectorate. Vancouver presented Kamehameha with a British flag which flew unofficially as Hawaii's flag until 1816. Vancouver's assistance to the King was helpful, particularly in lending tools and skilled workers for building him an armed 36-foot craft, the Britannia. The armaments may have aided Kamehameha's decisive victory at Battle of Nu'uanu, allowing him to unify the islands.

The expedition left Hawaiʻi for the final time on 15 March 1794. They spent late April and early May charting the furthest reaches of what Vancouver renamed Cook Inlet; Vancouver himself reached the head of Knik Arm, while Whidbey reached the head of Turnagain Arm. The last days of May and the second half of June were spent charting Prince William Sound: Whidbey the western half to Bligh Island, and Johnstone from there east and southwards. From here the expedition worked its way eastward. The weather was often freezing, as a result of which not only their store of live turtles (kept for meat) but Menzies' quarterdeck greenhouse froze, killing all his plants. While at Cook Inlet and Prince William Sound, they traded with the Russian settlements and natives alike.

By 9 July, they had anchored in what was named Port Althorp, a cove on the northwest coast of Chichagof Island. Soon Whidbey was dispatched to survey the area. He returned on the 27th. Despite constant rain and more than one hostile encounter with a large group of Tlingits, he was able to explore up Lynn Canal to the heads of both Chilkat and Chilkoot Inlets, and follow the length of the west coast of what was later named Admiralty Island, rounding its southern point to spend a night near Point Townshend on its southeast coast.

They left Port Althorp a few days later, sailing south along the west coasts of Chichagof and Baranof Islands. On the morning of 2 August they reached a cove on the southeast coast of the latter island, which Vancouver later named Port Conclusion. Two boat parties under Whidbey and Johnstone were sent out the next morning; both returned on the 20th "in the midst of a deluge of rain". While Whidbey proceeded up Stephens Passage and completed the survey of the east coast of Admiralty Island (including Seymour Canal and Glass Peninsula) and the continental shore opposite it, Johnstone charted the west, north, and east coasts of Kuiu Island, proving its insularity; the two met each other off the northeast coast of Kupreanof Island, Whidbey having investigated the channel to the east of the island before being stopped by shoals. According to the diaries of several officers, with the completion of their survey, they felt great joy at realizing they could return home. A few days after their return they left Port Conclusion. Unfortunately, as they set out for Nootka, Isaac Wooden was lost in a boating accident off Cape Ommaney, one of the few to die on the expedition. The treacherous rocks off the Cape were accordingly named Wooden Rocks.

Vancouver advanced to post rank on 28 August 1794. Four days later, Discovery and Chatham put into Nootka; all were saddened to learn that Quadra had suddenly died. Brigadier General José Manuel de Álava, the new Governor of Nootka, was cooperative and friendly, but no instructions had arrived to enable the commanders to resolve the situation. Álava and Vancouver were on friendly terms, jointly conducting local explorations, including a large celebration with Maquinna. On 6 October, the survey ships departed for Monterey. Daedalus was sent back to England with the troublesome Mr. Pitt, who had worn out his welcome with multiple disciplinary infractions.

On 6 November, Discovery put into Monterey in Alta California, to learn that while negotiations had most likely been concluded in Europe, there were still no instructions. The expedition left on 2 December, reached the Tres Maria Islands on 17 December for provisions and botanizing, and spent Christmas at sea.

== 1795 ==
Returning home, the expedition put in at the Cocos Island, the Galápagos Islands and the Juan Fernández Islands, reprovisioning whenever possible but beginning to suffer from scurvy.

Although they had orders to avoid Spanish possessions in the Pacific, necessity required some refitting and they had, in addition, orders to survey as much of the coast as possible. Vancouver therefore put into Valparaíso in the Viceroyalty of Peru and present day Chile, on 25 March for five weeks of repairs with the help of the Spanish. The expedition's officers enjoyed an official visit to the Capitan General and Royal Governor of Chile, Don Ambrosio O'Higgins de Vallenar, at the capital Santiago.

On 5 May, Discovery and Chatham sailed from Valparaíso, planning to reunite at St. Helena should weather separate them. The onset of Southern Hemisphere's winter and the badly worn condition of the ships made further survey of the Chilean coast impractical and passage for Cape Horn hazardous. Nonetheless, Vancouver spent much time searching for the island of Isla Grande, previously reported at 46.40.S, and confirmed its nonexistence.

About this time, Lt. Broughton and Lt. Mudge left England in HMS Providence to assist Vancouver; they reached Monterey long after the expedition made its final departure. Deciding (correctly) that Vancouver would not have left his surveying task unfinished, they departed to chart the coast of east Asia.

On 2 July, Discovery and Chatham put in at St. Helena and learned that the nation was at war; their battered ships were nearly the weakest vessels in the Atlantic. However, they captured a Dutch East Indiaman by surprise. This proved a mixed blessing; putting a crew on the prize required Vancouver to get additional hands where he could. During a storm, he ordered Menzies' servant to aid the crew, leaving Menzies' plants to be damaged; this further angered Menzies.

Off the Cape Verde Islands, Discovery caught up with a British convoy escorted by HMS Sceptre and, in relative safety, arrived at Shannon. Vancouver departed the ship to report; Baker brought Discovery safely home to Long Reach on the Thames, completing her four-and-a-half-year mission on 20 October 1795.

== Aftermath ==
The expedition returned to a Britain more interested in its ongoing war than in Pacific explorations. Vancouver was attacked by the politically well-connected Menzies for various slights. Thomas Pitt challenged Vancouver to a duel and attempted to beat him on a London streetcorner. Vancouver was no match for the political opponents ranged against him, and he was dying as well. His massive cartographical work was a few hundred pages short of completion at his death on 10 May 1798, but was finished by Puget.

Geopolitically, the expedition reduced Spanish influence in the Pacific Northwest and helped define the boundaries of the Oregon boundary dispute nearly a century later. It also assisted in the unification of the Kingdom of Hawai'i, which lasted until it was overthrown by pro-American elements in 1893. The expedition left the world hundreds, perhaps thousands, of place-names and plant species names.

== Vancouver's account ==
A Voyage of Discovery to the North Pacific Ocean, and Round the World, by George Vancouver. A 1798 edition of the work is available online in 3 volumes:

- Volume 1: Google Books: Vol. 1 (alternative link Vol 1); Internet Archive: Vol. 1,
- Volume 2: Google Books: Vol. 2; Internet Archive: Vol. 2,
- Volume 3: Google Books: Vol 3; Internet Archive: Vol. 3.

A modern edition (1984) by W. Kaye Lamb was renamed The Voyage of George Vancouver 1791–1795, and published by the Hakluyt Society of London, England.

== See also ==
- Robert Gray's Columbia River expedition
- Spanish expeditions to the Pacific Northwest

== Sources ==
- The Captain Cook Encyclopaedia, by Robson, John. London: Chatham Publishing, 2004. 1861762259. GBP 30.00. From Chatham Publishing
- Meany, Edmond Stephen. "Vancouver's discovery of Puget Sound". Mystic Seaport. Archived from the original on 27 September 2007.
