= Weewanie Hot Springs Provincial Park =

Thermal springs in British Columbia, Canada

- IUCN category II (national park)
- Location within British Columbia
- Interactive map of Weewanie Hot Springs Provincial Park
- Location: British Columbia, Canada
- Nearest city: Kitimat
- Coordinates: 53°41′53″N 128°47′21″W
- Area: 0.35 km^{2} (0.14 sq mi)
- Established: May 17, 2004
- Governing body: BC Parks

Weewanie Hot Springs Provincial Park is a provincial park in British Columbia, Canada, located on the east bank of Devastation Channel opposite the north end of Hawkesbury Island, in the Gardner Canal region south of Kitimat on the province's North Coast.

== History ==
Baths were built at these hot springs by A.A. Creed, Commodore of the Kitimat Yacht Club, for the benefit of travellers, and a preserve set aside by the provincial government. The site was created as a Class A provincial park in May 2004.

== Name origin ==
The name derives from that of nearby Weewanie Creek, which is to the south of the hotsprings. "Weewanie" is an adaptation of a Haisla word meaning "many creeks". The spring's traditional uses by the Haisla are hygienic, medicinal, ritual and recreational.

== Access ==
The park and hot springs are located approximately 38 km (24 mi) south of Kitimat. Access is by boat only.

== See also ==
- List of hot springs
- List of British Columbia provincial parks
