= William Gooch =

William Gooch may refer to:

- Sir William Gooch, 1st Baronet (1681–1751), governor of Virginia, 1727–1749
- William Gooch (astronomer) (1770–1792), English astronomer on the Vancouver Expedition
