= Roscoe Inlet =

Fjord in British Columbia

Roscoe Inlet is a fjord in the North Coast region of the Canadian province of British Columbia. It lies east of the Florence Peninsula, north of Johnson Channel. Its southern half was first charted in 1793 by George Vancouver and Spelman Swaine during their 1791-1795 expedition.

The inlet is in the Fiordland Conservancy, along with nearby Kynoch and Mussel Inlets.
