= Verney Passage =

Channel in the North Coast of British Columbia

Coordinates: 53°30′19″N 129°04′23″W

Verney Passage is a channel in the North Coast region of the Canadian province of British Columbia. It lies between Douglas and Devastation Channels, separating Hawkesbury Island to the northwest from Gribbell Island to the southeast. It was named in 1864 by Captain Daniel Pender after Edmund Hope Verney.
