= Borup =

Borup or Børup may refer to:

Places

- Borup, Minnesota, U.S.A.
- Borup, Køge Municipality, Denmark, a parish and railway town
- Borup, Randers Municipality, Denmark, a parish and small village in Randers Municipality
- Borup Fiord, Canada
- Borup Fiord Pass, Canada
- Borup Island, Greenland

People

- Axel Borup-Jørgensen (1924-2012), Danish composer
- George Borup (1885-1912), American explorer and paleontologist
- Morten Børup (1446–1526), Danish educator, cathedral cantor and Latin poet
- Yvette Borup Andrews (1891-1959), American photographer, filmmaker in Asia

== See also ==
- Borups Allé, a major road in the northwestern part of inner Copenhagen, Denmark
- Borups Corners, an unincorporated community within Melgund Township, Ontario
