= Wright Sound =

Waterway in British Columbia, Canada

Coordinates: 53°20′00″N 129°14′00″W

Wright Sound is a waterway on the North Coast of British Columbia, Canada. Wright Sound is 135 kilometers (84 mi) south of Prince Rupert and lies at the southern opening of Grenville Channel and between Gil, Gribbell and Pitt Islands. The small town of Hartley Bay sits on its northern shore and is home to the Gitga'ata, a Tsimshian group. On the north side of Wright Sound develops the Douglas Channel.

Wright Sound is part of the Inside Passage that connects Alaska, British Columbia, and Washington. The Inside Passage is protected by coastal islands from the more open waters of Queen Charlotte Sound, Hecate Strait and the Dixon Entrance, which are more exposed to the open Pacific Ocean, and so makes it a safer route for vessels. Though the passage all the way up to kitimat has been the course of some controversy. The proposed Enbridge pipeline would have large container ships pass through this area in high volume. BC Ferries transports passengers, vehicles, and cargo to and from many remote communities in this area, although in the past various shipping lines served the route, which is also heavily travelled by cruise ships and also by the southward line of the Alaska Marine Highway system. On March 22, 2006, the BC Ferries vessel Queen of the North sank in Wright Sound, with the survivors being rescued by the residents of Hartley Bay in a daring night rescue on rough water. Two people died.
