= Nakat Inlet =

Coordinates: 54°53′38″N 130°44′29″W

Nakat Inlet is an inlet in Southeast Alaska, U.S.A. The inlet extends north from Ledge Point, at the head of Nakat Bay. The inlet's name possibly derives from the Tlingit term "Nakatse" (English: fox). It was first charted in 1793 by George Vancouver.
