= Inlet =

Indentation of a shoreline

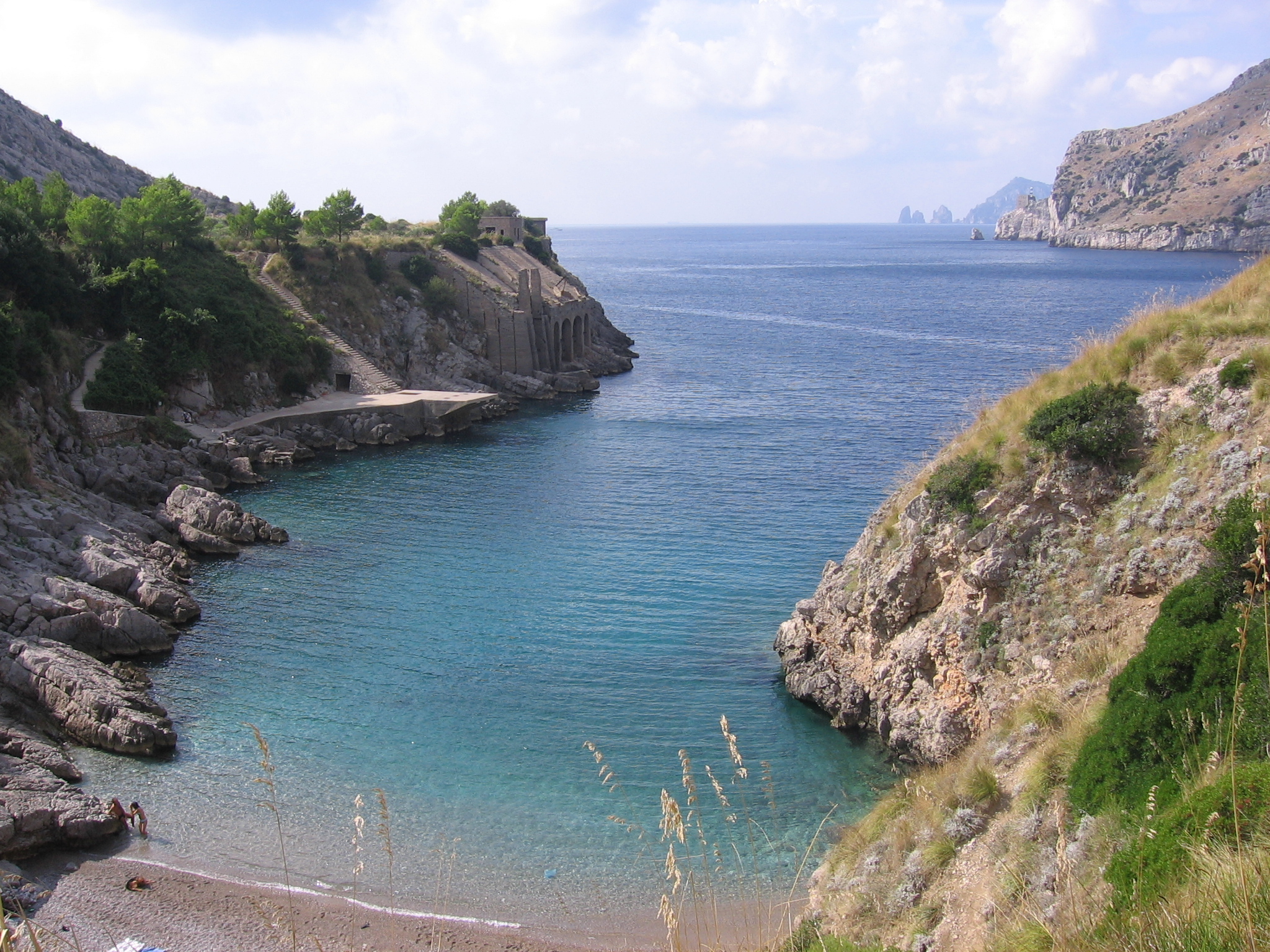
Bay at the Gulf of Salerno, Italy

An inlet is a typically long and narrow indentation of a shoreline such as a small arm, cove, bay, sound, fjord, lagoon or marsh, that leads to an enclosed larger body of water such as a lake, estuary, gulf or marginal sea.

== Overview ==
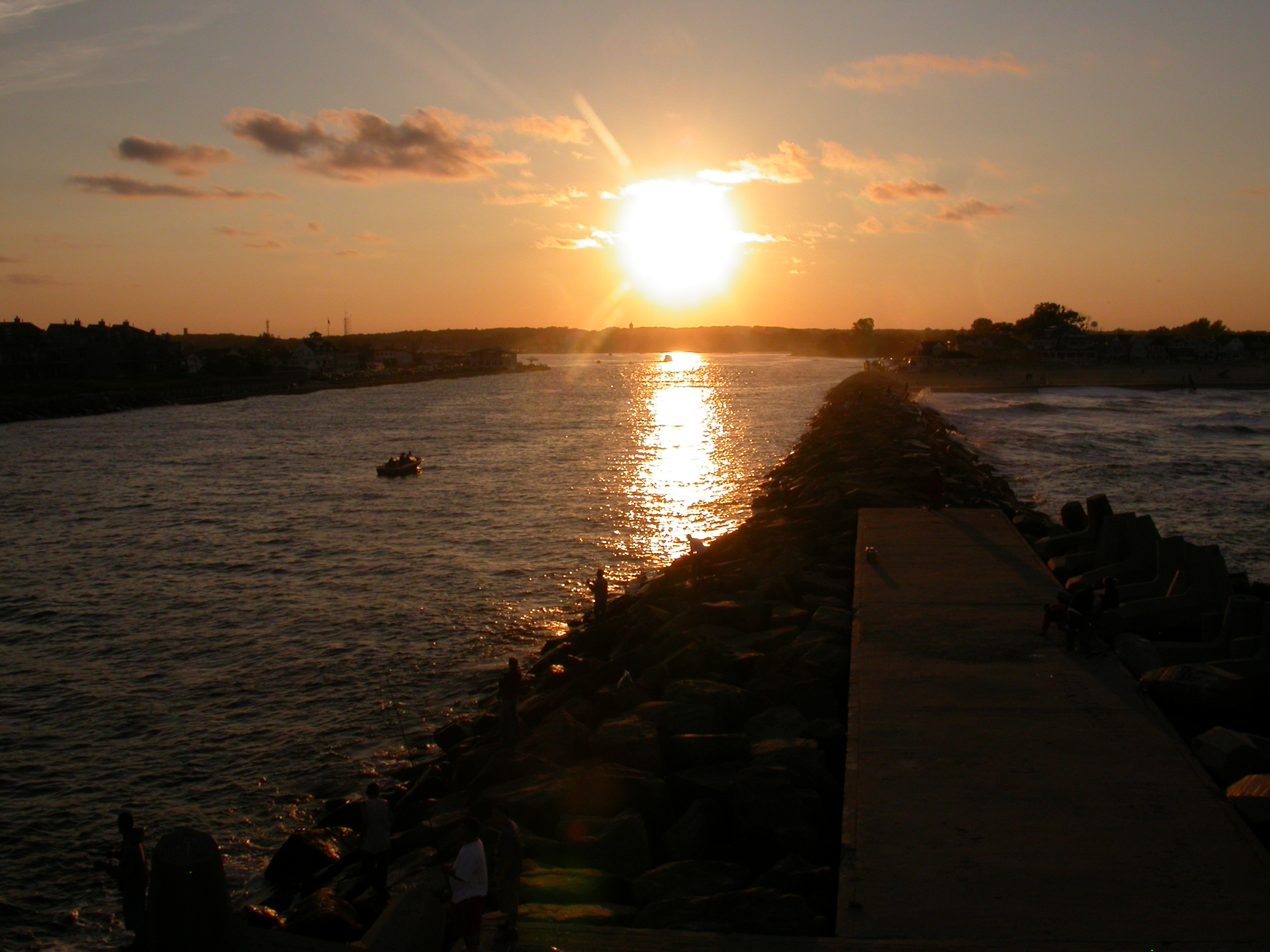
The Jersey Shore extends inland from the Atlantic Ocean into its many inlets, including Manasquan Inlet, looking westward at sunset from the jetty at Manasquan, New Jersey, U.S.

In marine geography, the term "inlet" usually refers to either the actual channel between an enclosed bay and the open ocean and is often called an "entrance", or a significant recession in the shore of a sea, lake or large river. A certain kind of inlet created by past glaciation is a fjord, typically but not always in mountainous coastlines and also in montane lakes.

Multi-arm complexes of large inlets or fjords may be called sounds, e.g., Puget Sound, Howe Sound, Karmsund (sund is Scandinavian for "sound"). Some fjord-type inlets are called canals, e.g., Portland Canal, Lynn Canal, Hood Canal, and some are channels, e.g., Dean Channel and Douglas Channel.

Tidal amplitude, wave intensity, and wave direction are all factors that influence sediment flux in inlets.

On low slope sandy coastlines, inlets often separate barrier islands and can form as the result of storm events. Alongshore sediment transport can cause inlets to close if the action of tidal currents flowing through an inlet do not flush accumulated sediment out of the inlet.

== See also ==
- Alaska Panhandle
- British Columbia Coast
- Calanque
- Inside Passage
- Ria
