= Cousins Inlet =

Fjord in British Columbia, Canada

Coordinates: 52°19′10″N 127°45′05″W

Cousins Inlet is a fjord in the Central Coast region of the Canadian province of British Columbia. It extends north from Fisher Channel. At its head is the community of Ocean Falls. It was first charted in 1793 by George Vancouver and Spelman Swaine, during their 1791–1795 expedition to survey the Pacific Northwest.

Ocean Falls Water Aerodrome is located in the inlet, adjacent to the community of Ocean Falls.
