= Vendom Fiord =

Inlet in Ellesmere Island, Canada

- Location in Nunavut
- Location: Ellesmere Island, Nunavut
- Coordinates: 77°45′N 83°00′W
- Ocean/sea sources: Baumann Fiord
- Basin countries: Canada

Vendom Fiord is a natural inlet in the south-west of Ellesmere Island, Nunavut in the Arctic Archipelago. To the south, it opens into Baumann Fiord.
