= Gilttoyees Inlet =

Inlet in British Columbia, Canada

Coordinates: 53°50′09″N 128°58′24″W

Gilttoyees Inlet is an inlet in the North Coast region of the Canadian province of British Columbia. It extends north from Douglas Channel. Its name derives from the Haisla term for the inlet, Giltu'yis (English: long inlet). It was first charted in 1793 by Joseph Whidbey and Robert Barrie, two of George Vancouver's officers during his 1791-95 expedition.
