= Gribbell Island =

Island in British Columbia, Canada

Gribbell Island is an island on the North Coast of British Columbia, Canada, located on the east side of the entrance to Douglas Channel at Wright Sound. Gribble Island Indian Reserve No. 10 is on its west coast, between Verney Passage and Ursula Channel at 53°21′00″N 129°08′00″W. The small Wimbledon Range is on the south side of the island, facing the northern extremities of Princess Royal Island to the south, at 53°21′00″N 129°02′00″W

== Name origin ==
"Named in 1867 by Capt. Daniel Pender, RN, after his brother-in-law, the Rev. Francis Barrow Gribbell, a clergyman of the Church of England. Arrived in Victoria, 1865; in charge of St. John's, Victoria, 1868; Rector of St. Paul's, Esquimalt, 1869; Principal of the collegiate school, Victoria, 1870-1875, when he returned to England. Vicar of Erith, Kent 1881; Vicar of Ringmer, Kent, 1891, where he now resides, 1906."

The Valhalla Wilderness Society has dubbed Gribbell Island the "Mother Island of the White Bear" The "white bear" referenced is the Kermode bear.
