= Borup Fiord =

Fjord in Nunavut, Canada

- Location in Nunavut
- Location: Ellesmere Island, Nunavut
- Coordinates: 80°37′N 83°25′W
- Ocean/sea sources: Greely Fiord
- Basin countries: Canada

Borup Fiord is a fjord located on Ellesmere Island, Qikiqtaaluk Region, Nunavut, Canada. The mouth of the fiord opens into Greely Fiord. To the west is Oobloyah Bay and to the north is the Neil Peninsula and the Neil Icecap. The eastern arm, known as Esayoo Bay leads to Borup Fiord Pass. Detailed studies of the Borup Fiord area between Oobloyah Bay and Esayoo Bay have been done in summer 1988 by geographers from Heidelberg University. It was named in honor of American polar explorer George Borup.

== See also ==
- List of fjords in Canada
