= Briggs Inlet =

Fjord in British Columbia, Canada

Coordinates: 52°24′33″N 127°59′31″W

Briggs Inlet is a fjord in the North Coast region of the Canadian province of British Columbia. It lies between the Florence and Coldwell Peninsulas. It was named by H.D. Parizeau of the Hydrographic Service after Thomas S. Briggs, a former agent with the Canadian Pacific Navigation Company. It was first charted in 1793 by Spelman Swaine, one of George Vancouver's lieutenants during his 1791-95 expedition.
