= Ursula Channel =

Channel in British Columbia, Canada

Coordinates: 53°25′02″N 128°54′46″W

Ursula Channel is a channel in the North Coast region of British Columbia. It separates the east coast of Gribbell Island from the mainland. It was first charted in 1793 by Joseph Whidbey, master of the Discovery during George Vancouver’s 1791-95 expedition.

== See also ==
- Vancouver Expedition
- List of fjords in Canada
