= Cascade Inlet =

Fjord in British Columbia, Canada

Coordinates: 52°30′04″N 127°31′19″W

Cascade Inlet is a fjord in the North Coast region of the Canadian province of British Columbia. It extends northwest from Dean Channel. It was first charted in 1793 by George Vancouver and Spelman Swaine during their 1791-95 expedition. Vancouver named it "Cascade Channel" due to the great number of waterfalls he saw along its sides when he first explored the inlet.
