= Fiordland Conservancy =

Conservancy in British Columbia, Canada

- IUCN category Ib (wilderness area)
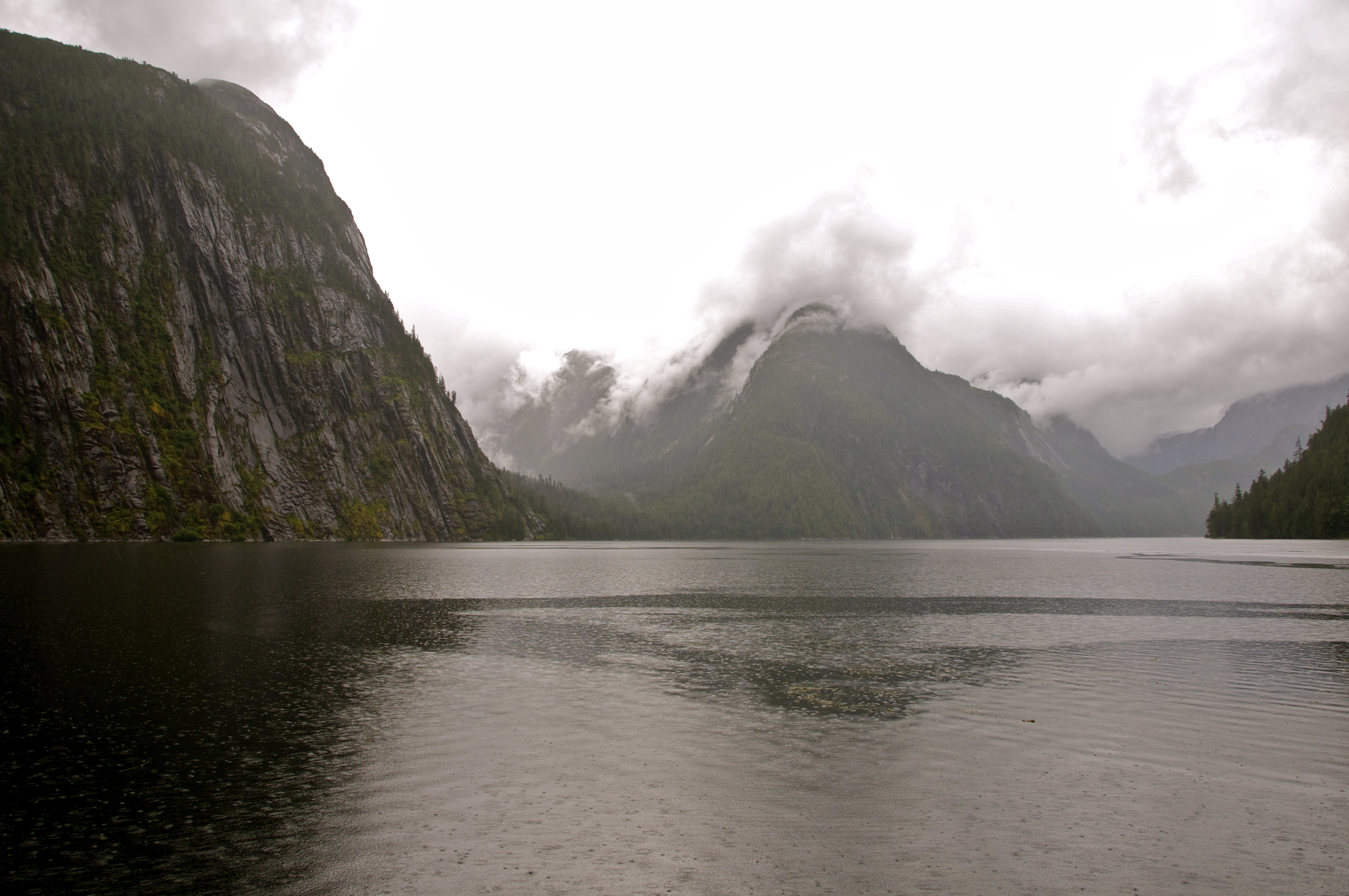
- Kynoch Inlet, Fiordland Conservancy

- Location within British Columbia
- Location: Kitimat-Stikine, British Columbia, Canada
- Nearest city: Bella Bella
- Coordinates: 52°51′00″N 128°00′00″W
- Area: 76,825 ha (296.62 sq mi)
- Designation: Conservancy
- Established: 1987
- Governing body: BC Parks

The Fiordland Conservancy, also known as the Fiordland Recreation Area formerly, and since also as the Fiordland Conservation Area, is a conservancy in British Columbia, Canada. It preserves a portion of the province's coast containing glacial fjords; at the time of its inception it was the only protected area in the system protecting this particular environmental zone. Established in 1987, the park covers 76,825 hectares of the Kitimat Ranges, part of the Coast Mountains, and 7,592 hectares of foreshore. It is located approximately 100 kilometers north of the town of Bella Coola. The park encompasses two major inlets — Mussel and Kynoch. As there is no road access to the park, it is mainly enjoyed by sailors and kayakers. Although there are no modern settlements in the area, the Heiltsuk people have maintained villages along the shores in the past. The nearest settlements are Klemtu and Bella Bella.
