= Borup Fiord Pass =

Valley in Nunavut, Canada

Coordinates: 81°00′N 081°40′W

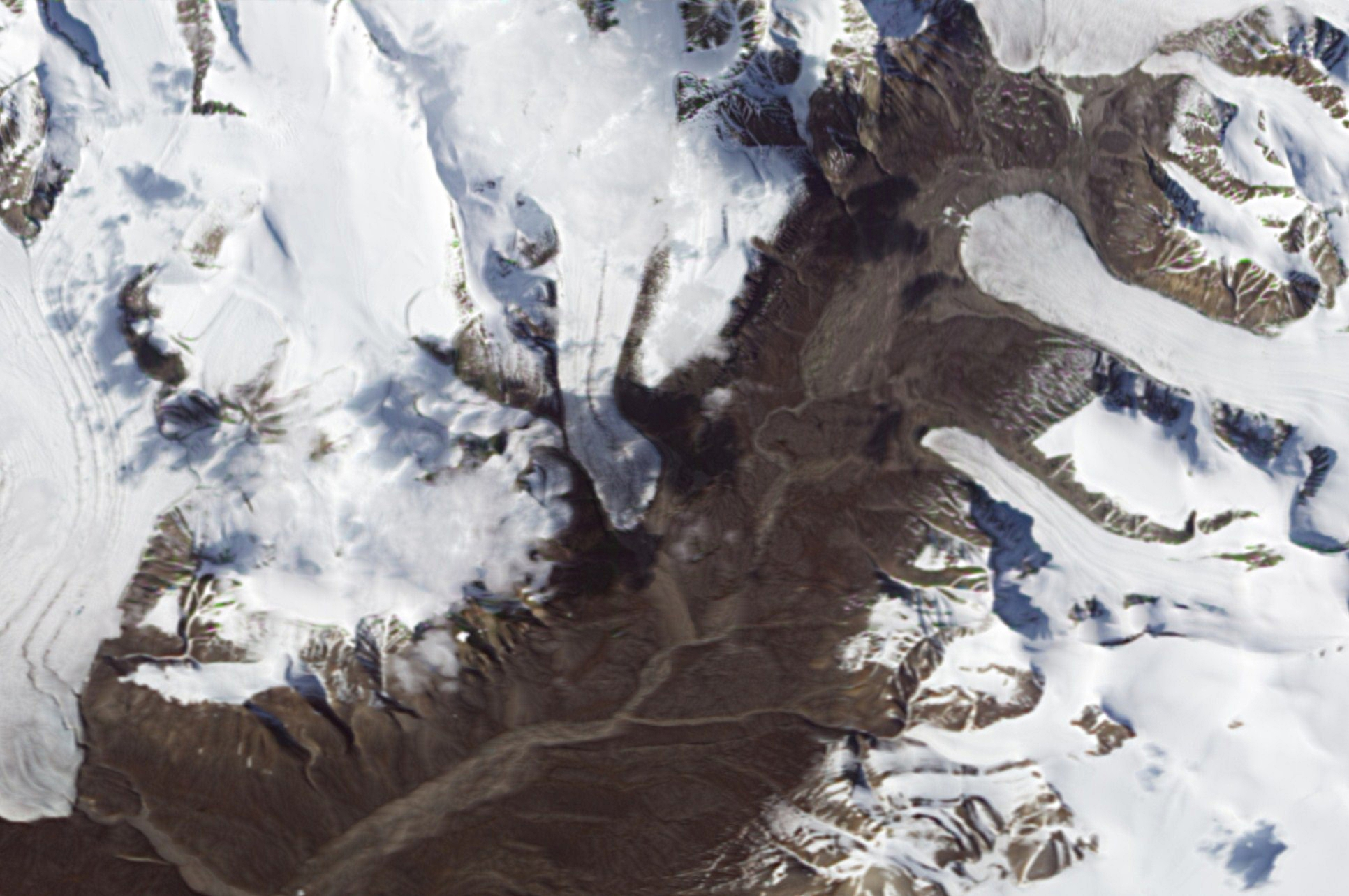
Satellite image of the Borup Fiord Pass area including Borup Pass spring.

Location within Canada

Borup Fiord Pass is a glacier-carved valley on Ellesmere Island in Nunavut, Canada. The valley contains a natural spring which carries fluids from the subsurface to the surface, sometimes passing through the glacial ice in the process. The spring is the only known place where sulfur from a natural spring is deposited over ice. At the Borup Fiord Pass spring, hydrogen sulphide gas in the water is converted to stable deposits of either elemental sulfur, the most common material in the deposit, or gypsum. The process by which hydrogen sulfide becomes sulfur is complex, and most often occurs when microbes, like bacteria, are present.

To the south the pass leads into Esayoo Bay, part of the Borup Fiord.
