= Cañon Fiord =

- Location in Nunavut
- Location: Ellesmere Island, Nunavut
- Coordinates: 80°00′N 82°35′W
- Ocean/sea sources: Greely Fiord
- Basin countries: Canada

Cañon Fiord is a natural inlet in the west of Ellesmere Island, Nunavut in the Arctic Archipelago. To the north, it opens into Greely Fiord and to the east lies the Agassiz Ice Cap.
