= Mussel Inlet =

Canadian inlet

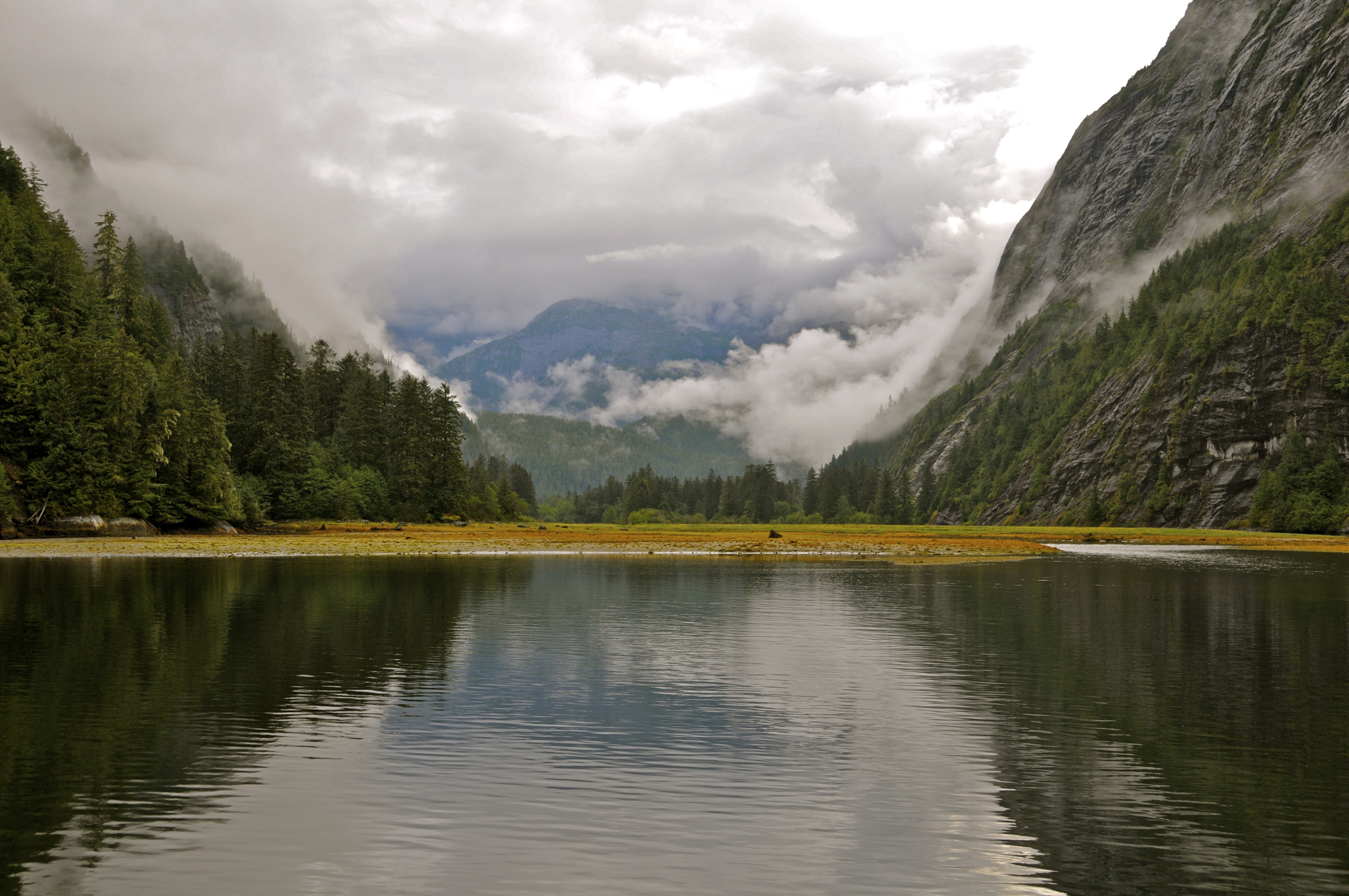
Poison Cove, Mussel Inlet

Mussel Inlet is in inlet in the North Coast region of the Canadian province of British Columbia. It is a northeast extension of Sheep Passage, and part of the Fiordland Conservancy.

== Name origin and history ==
It was first charted in 1793 by James Johnstone, one of George Vancouver's officers during his 1791-95 expedition. It was here the men ate mussels that poisoned and killed one of them, John Carter, for whom Carter Bay is named; it is at the junction of Finlayson Channel and the west end of Sheep Passage at 52°49′33″N 128°23′46″W. Poison Cove at 52°54′21″N 128°02′00″W being the location where the mussels were harvested. A creek northwest into that cove is Poison Cove Creek.
