= Greely Fiord =

- Location in Nunavut
- Location: Ellesmere Island, Nunavut
- Coordinates: 80°30′N 81°40′W
- Ocean/sea sources: Nansen Sound
- Basin countries: Canada

Greely Fiord is a natural inlet in the west of Ellesmere Island, Qikiqtaaluk Region, Nunavut, in the Arctic Archipelago of Canada. To the south lies the Cañon Fiord and the Agassiz Ice Cap. To the northwest is Borup Fiord and Tanquary Fiord is northeast.
