= Fitz Hugh Sound =

Body of water on the coast of British Columbia, Canada

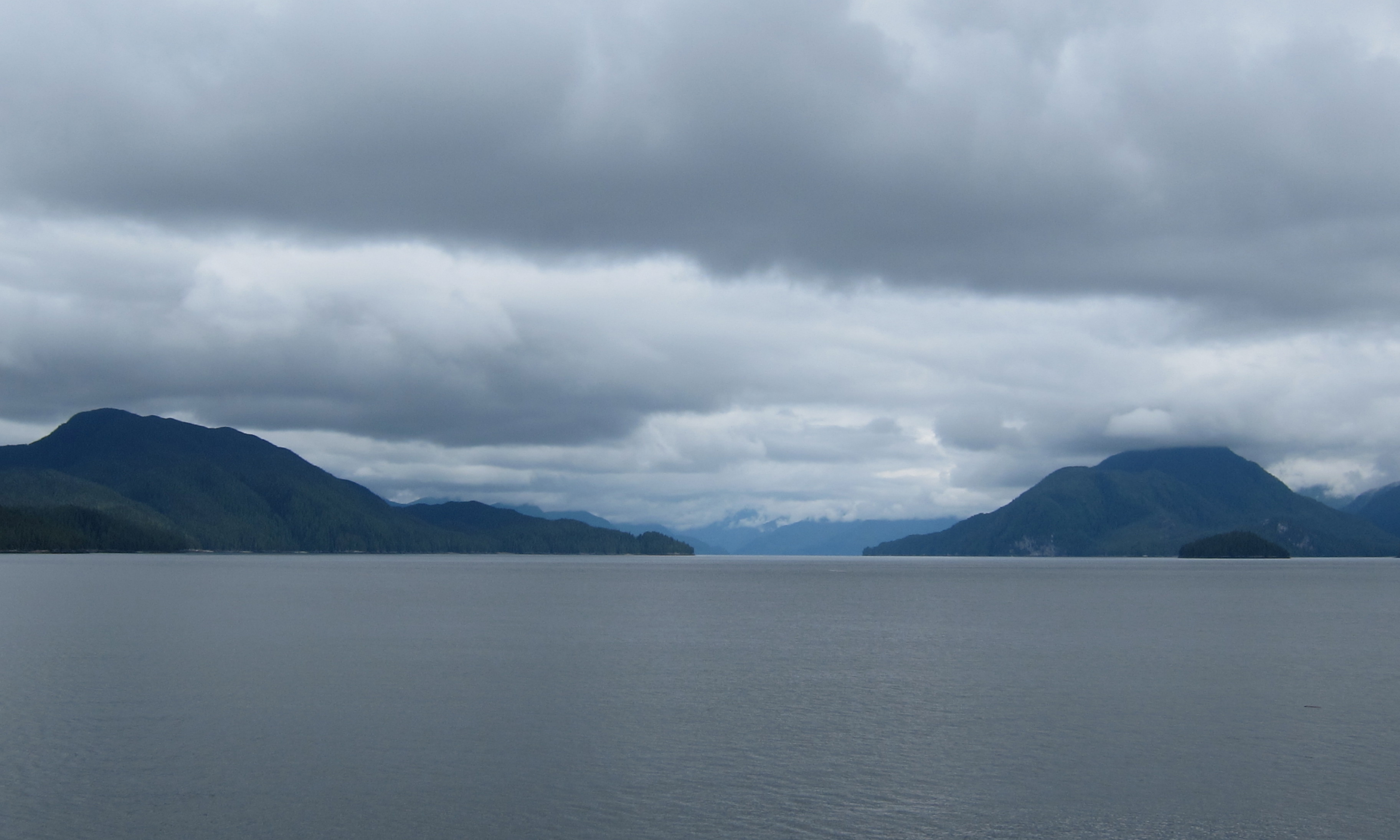
- Fitz Hugh Sound, looking north

- Location within British Columbia
- Location: Central Coast, British Columbia
- Coordinates: 51°40′30″N 127°55′05″W
- Ocean/sea sources: Pacific Ocean

Fitz Hugh Sound, sometimes spelled Fitzhugh Sound, is a sound on the British Columbia Coast of Canada, located between Calvert Island and the mainland.

== Etymology ==
Fitz Hugh Sound was given its name in 1785 by James Hanna, the first non-indigenous person to find and map it. Hanna was the first British maritime fur trader to visit the Northwest Coast. It was probably named for William Fitzhugh who was a partner in the explorations of John Meares.

== Geography ==
Fitz Hugh Sound is part of a group of named bodies of water around the opening of Dean Channel, one of the coast's main fjords, where it intersects the infra-insular waterway known as the Inside Passage. Adjacent water bodies include Fisher Channel to the north, Burke Channel to the northeast, Fish Egg Inlet to its east, Rivers Inlet to its southeast, and Queen Charlotte Sound to its south and west. Beyond Queen Charlotte Sound lies Queen Charlotte Strait (to the southeast) and the open ocean (to the west).

Fitz Hugh Sound is the southern limit of the large group of offshore islands known as the North Coast Archipelago, which extends to the Dixon Entrance and the opening of the Portland Canal at the boundary of Alaska.
