= William Gooch (astronomer) =

English astronomer

- Born: William Gooch; 3 April 1770; Brockdish, Norfolk
- Died: 12 May 1792 (aged 22); Waimea, Oahu, Hawaii
- Cause of death: Murder
- Education: Gonville and Caius College, Cambridge
- Occupation: Astronomer

William Gooch (3 April 1770 – 12 May 1792) was an English astronomer.

== Biography ==
=== Early life ===
Gooch was born on 3 April 1770 to William and Sarah Gooch and baptised on 8 May 1770 at the church of St. Peter and St. Paul, Brockdish near Diss in Norfolk. William was schooled in nearby Harleston, Norfolk and later Stradbroke School in Suffolk. His sister, Sarah, succumbed to smallpox at the age of 10 in 1777 and so, in "tender solicitude", his parents were protective over their son and would not let him "mix with other children, except in their presence".

Gooch's father was barber and peruke maker to the gentry of Brockdish, church warden and also fulfilled the role of village constable for a short time. It was due to his father's services that the young William came to the attention of the owner of the village hall, Thomas Maynard (later Sir Thomas Maynard Hesilrige, 10th Baronet of Noseley Hall), who proved key in providing Gooch with the opportunity to attend Gonville and Caius College, Cambridge.

=== Cambridge education ===
William Gooch was admitted as a sizar to Gonville and Caius College, Cambridge at the age of 16 on 30 May 1786, matriculated in the Michaelmas term of 1787, achieved his B.A. (Second Wrangler) in 1791 being awarded with the Smith's Prize and the Schuldham college prize and became a junior Fellow until his death in 1792.

At Cambridge, Gooch formed a friendship with a Miss Sally Smithson, the daughter of a cook at St John's College, Cambridge, with whom he continued to correspond after setting sail to join the Vancouver Expedition. He affectionately referred to her as "little goody two-shoes".

=== From student to astronomer ===
It had been presumed that Gooch would follow his academic career into the priesthood, but perhaps being aware of the need for an astronomer to join the Vancouver Expedition, before he had sat his final exams, his Cambridge associates Samuel Vince and John Brinkley, who had both attended the same school as Gooch at Harleston, suggested him to Nevil Maskelyne, the Astronomer Royal, who sat on the Board of Longitude.

After some lobbying from his Cambridge supporters and friends, Gooch travelled to London in April 1791, and Maskelyne began preparing him for the expedition. He also received advice on his forthcoming adventure from William Wales, who had served as astronomer to Cook. In July 1791, Gooch was making his final preparations and boarding the Daedalus at Deptford.

Gooch was appointed at a salary of £400 a year and issued with a suit of navigational and astronomical instruments. He sailed on the storeship Daedelus in August 1791, aiming to meet George Vancouver at Nootka Sound.

=== Death and legacy ===
In Gooch's final letter to his parents, written on 2 May 1792, he speaks of his concerns over having used a false meridian and his hopes of being re-united with them in the autumn of 1794. On 11 May 1792, Lieutenant Richard Hergest, commander of the Daedalus, embarked on the ship's cutter along with Gooch and a small crew to trade with the locals and re-supply with fresh water at Waimea on Oahu, in the Hawaiian Islands. The party was attacked by Pahupu (Hawaiian warriors) on 12 May. Hergest, Gooch and a sailor were cut off from the rest of the group and killed.

Gooch's story is recorded in his letters, many of which were to his parents, and journal which are housed as part of the Board of Longitude archive at Cambridge University Library.

His biography, The Death of William Gooch: A History's Anthropology, was written in 1995 by Greg Dening and illustrates the dangers of cross-cultural encounters in the exploration era.

== Bibliography ==
- "Letters, memoranda and journal containing the history of Mr William Gooch". Cambridge Digital Library.
- "Observations in the voyage of the Daedalus: Volume 1". Cambridge Digital Library.
- "Observations in the voyage of the Daedalus: Volume 2". Cambridge Digital Library.
- Bown, Stephen. (2008). Madness, Betrayal and the Lash: The Epic Voyage of Captain George Vancouver. Canada: Douglas & McIntyre. ISBN 978-1553653394.
- Dening, Greg. (1995). The Death of William Gooch: A History's Anthropology. Honolulu: University of Hawaiʻi Press. ISBN 0-8248-1754-0.
- Howse, Derek. (1989). Nevil Maskelyne: The Seaman's Astronomer. Cambridge: Cambridge University Press. ISBN 0-521-36261-X.
- Robin Fisher; Hugh Johnston, eds. (1993). From Maps to Metaphors: The Pacific World of George Vancouver. Vancouver: UBC Press. ISBN 0-7748-0470-X.

== See also ==
- National Maritime Museum, Greenwich
- Vancouver Expedition
