= Nakat Bay =

Bay in Alaska, United States

Coordinates: 54°46′59″N 130°46′22″W

Nakat Bay is a bay in Southeast Alaska, United States. The bay extends northeast 8 kilometres (5.0 mi) from Cape Fox. It was charted in 1793 by George Vancouver. The bay's name comes from a Tlingit name published in 1853 on a Russian Hydrographic Department chart as "Bukh(ta) Nakat" (English: Nakat Bay).
