= Burke Channel =

Coastal channel in British Columbia, Canada

Coordinates: 52°09′14″N 127°27′48″W

Burke Channel is a channel in the Central Coast region of the Canadian province of British Columbia, separating the south and east coasts of King Island from the mainland. It was first charted in 1792 by James Johnstone, one of George Vancouver's officers during his 1791-1795 expedition. Vancouver named it "Burke's Channel" after Edmund Burke.
