= King Island (British Columbia) =

Island in British Columbia, Canada

Coordinates: 52°10′N 127°43′W

King Island is an island on the Coast of the Canadian province of British Columbia. It is located south of Dean Channel and about 20 kilometres (12 mi) east of Bella Bella. A number of other islands separate King Island from the open sea of Queen Charlotte Sound.

King Island is separated from the mainland by Dean Channel to the north, Burke Channel to the south, and Labouchere Channel to the east. Fisher Channel, essentially an extension of Dean Channel, separates King Island from several islands to the west, including Denny Island and Hunter Island. Fisher Channel and Burke Channel join at the southern end of King Island, becoming Fitz Hugh Sound.

In the Nuxalk language the island's name is Nuxalknalus, "centre of Nuxalk Territory".

King Island is 808 square kilometres (312 sq mi) in area, making it the seventh largest island in British Columbia.

King Island was named in 1793 by George Vancouver, in honor of the family of Captain James King, under whom Vancouver had served as a midshipman on the Discovery during the latter part of the third voyage of James Cook. Dean Channel and Raphoe Point was named after James King (1715–1795), Dean of Raphoe.

== See also ==
- King Island Pluton
