= Fisher Channel =

Channel in the Central Coast region of British Columbia, Canada

Coordinates: 52°05′09″N 127°53′16″W

Fisher Channel is a channel in the Central Coast region of the Canadian province of British Columbia. To its west are Hunter and Denny Islands, to its east King Island. It was first charted in 1793 by George Vancouver during his 1791-95 expedition. He named it "Fisher’s Channel" after "a much-respected friend" Reverend John Fisher.
