= Baumann Fiord =

Fjord in Nunavut, Canada

- Location in Nunavut
- Location: Ellesmere Island, Nunavut
- Coordinates: 77°40′N 85°35′W
- Basin countries: Canada

Baumann Fiord is a natural inlet in the south-west of Ellesmere Island, Qikiqtaaluk Region, Nunavut in the Arctic Archipelago. To the west, it opens into Norwegian Bay. Hoved Island lies in the fiord.
