= Douglas Channel =

Inlet on the coast of British Columbia, Canada

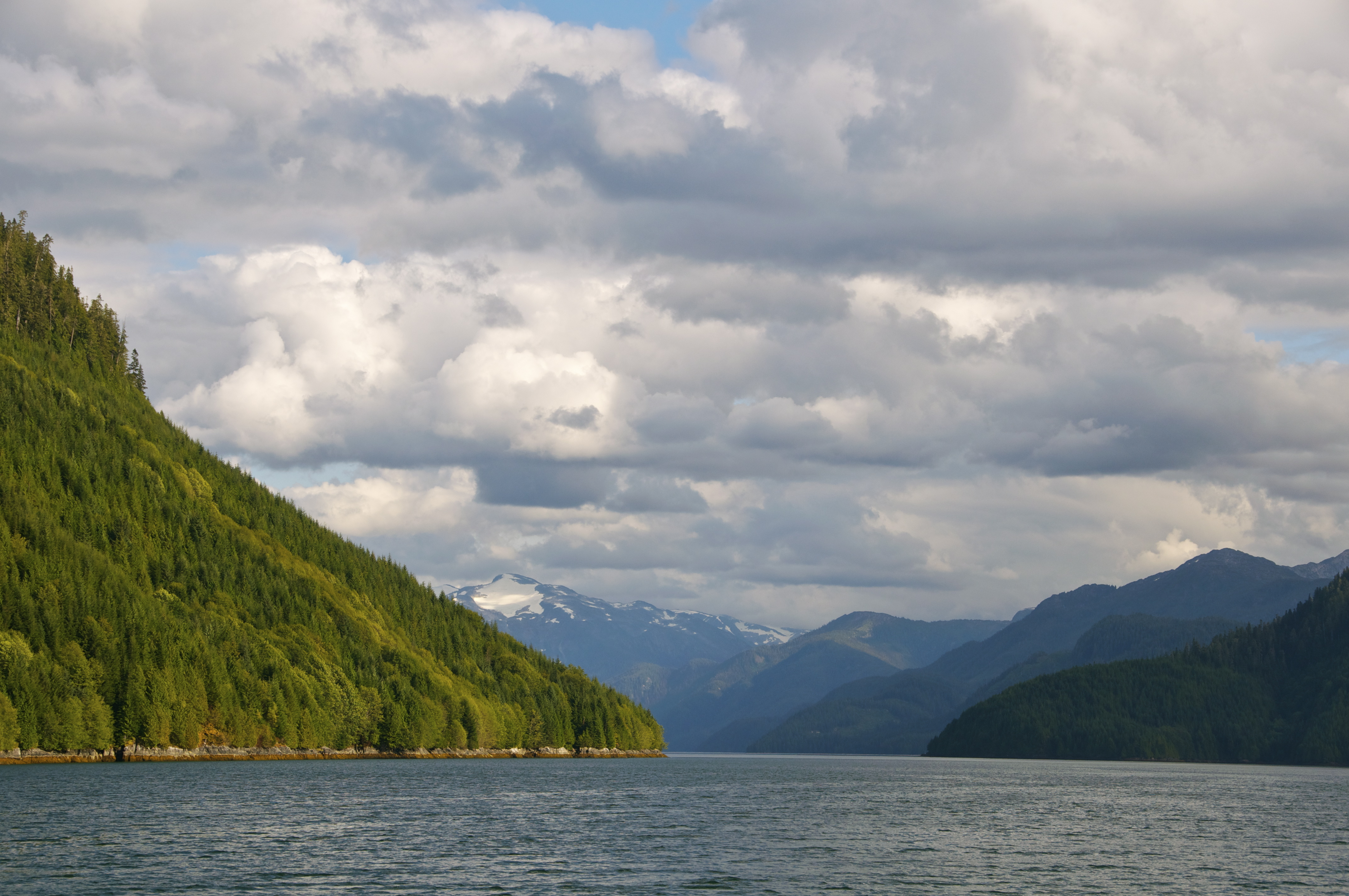
- Douglas Channel

- Location in British Columbia
- Location: British Columbia, Canada
- Coordinates: 53°40′N 129°08′W
- Type: Fjord
- Ocean/sea sources: Pacific Ocean

Douglas Channel is one of the principal inlets (or fjords) of the British Columbia Coast, into which the Kitimat River flows. The channel was named in honour of Sir James Douglas, the first governor of the Colony of British Columbia. The official length, from the head of Kitimat Arm and the aluminum smelter town of Kitimat to Wright Sound (on the Inside Passage ferry route), is 90 km (56 mi). The full length of the fjord's waterways includes waters between Kitimat and the open waters of the Hecate Strait, outside of the coastal archipelago, stretching for another 60 km (37 mi), reaching 140 km (87 mi) in-total.

== Geography ==
A major side-inlet, the Gardner Canal, is 90 km (56 mi) in length, accessible from the Kitimat Arm of the Douglas Channel via Devastation Channel (20 km, 12 mi), on the east side of Hawkesbury Island. South of Hawkesbury is Verney Passage (40 km, 25 mi), which has a side-channel called Ursula Passage (30 km, 19 mi). Total length of the fjord waterway dominated by Douglas Channel is therefore (not counting smaller side-inlets) roughly 320 km (200 mi), considerably longer than Norway's Sognefjord (203 km, 126 mi) or Greenland's Scoresby Sound at 350 km (220 mi), though not as long as nearby Dean Channel's total of 335 km (208 mi).

== Industry ==
Douglas Channel is a busy shipping artery because of the methanol import terminal (formerly methanol production and export) and the aluminum smelter at Kitimat, as bauxite must be shipped in and smelted aluminum shipped out. Expansions of the Port of Kitimat have increased the port capacity of the British Columbia's North Coast and decreased the shipping monopoly of the nearby city, Prince Rupert.

The methanol production and export plant closed in 2006.

Douglas Channel will be subject to new sensitive ship traffic when the LNG Canada natural gas storage and liquefaction terminal is completed and operational, which is estimated to be in 2025. The project, led by an liquefied natural gas (LNG) subsidiary of Royal Dutch Shell and several Asian partners and finally approved on October 1, 2018, will see large LNG carrier ships loading liquefied natural gas at the future Kitimat LNG terminal, to carry it to export destinations, mainly in Asia.

The Gardner Canal is important for being the location of the Kemano Generating Station of the Nechako Diversion, which was built to supply power for Kitimat. The head of the Gardner Canal, also, is the mouth of the Kitlope River, a major wildlife and wilderness preserve and area of outstanding natural beauty and harsh weather.
