= Devastation Channel =

Coordinates: 53°40′09″N 128°50′09″W

Devastation Channel is a channel in the North Coast region of the Canadian province of British Columbia. It lies between Hawkesbury Island and the mainland. It was named in 1863 by Captain Daniel Pender after the H.M. paddle-sloop Devastation. It was first charted in 1793 by Joseph Whidbey, master of the Discovery during George Vancouver's 1791-95 expedition.
