= Hawkesbury Island =

Island in British Columbia, Canada

Coordinates: 53°36′30″N 129°2′0″W

Hawkesbury Island is an island in British Columbia, Canada. It is located in Douglas Channel, one of the major fjords of the British Columbia Coast. Hawkesbury is 43 kilometres (27 mi) long and ranges in width from 3 kilometres (1.9 mi) to 19 kilometres (12 mi). It covers an area of 365 square kilometres (141 sq mi).

Hawkesbury Island was named by George Vancouver for Charles Jenkinson, Baron Hawkesbury, President of the Board of Trade 1786–1804.
