= Queen of Prince Rupert =

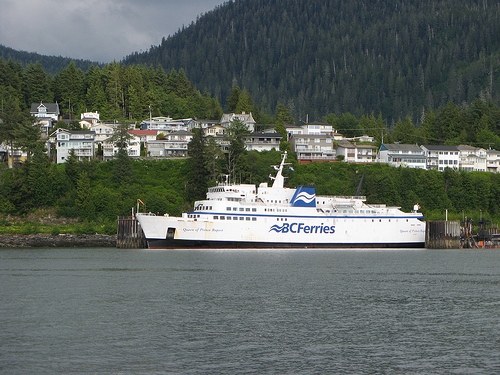
- Queen of Prince Rupert at dock in Prince Rupert, 2007

History
- Name: Queen of Prince Rupert
- Owner: BC Ferries
- Operator: BC Ferries
- Port of registry: Victoria, Canada
- Route: Prince Rupert–Skidegate, Prince Rupert–Port Hardy
- Builder: Victoria Machinery Depot
- Cost: $6–7 million
- Laid down: November 30, 1964
- Launched: October 15, 1965
- Christened: October 15, 1965
- Completed: 1966
- Out of service: April 20, 2009
- Identification: IMO number: 6525179; MMSI number: 520229000; Call sign: 3DSI
- Fate: Sold to Goundar Shipping Company, Fiji, 2011

General characteristics
- Tonnage: 5,864 tons
- Length: 101.15 m (332 ft)
- Installed power: 7,680 hp (5.73 MW)
- Propulsion: Four Mirrlees KLSSMR8
- Speed: 18.0 kn (33.3 km/h)
- Capacity: 544 (passengers and crew); 80 vehicles

Queen of Prince Rupert was a roll-on/roll-off (RORO) ferry operated by BC Ferries that provided the main surface transport link between the Queen Charlotte Islands and mainland British Columbia, connecting Skidegate with Prince Rupert across the Hecate Strait (thus linking two segments of Highway 16). The vessel also ran on the Prince Rupert–Port Hardy Inside Passage route during the low season.

Built in 1965, Queen of Prince Rupert was decommissioned on April 20, 2009 following the launch of Northern Expedition and was replaced by Northern Adventure on the Prince Rupert–Skidegate route.

On May 4, 2011, the official registration of Queen of Prince Rupert was closed. The vessel was sold to Goundar Shipping Company of Fiji and renamed Lomaiviti Princess. The vessel departed British Columbia waters bound for Fiji on August 5, 2011.

== History ==
Queen of Prince Rupert was built by Victoria Machinery Depot, Victoria and completed in 1966 as the first BC Ferries vessel to serve the Inside Passage from northern Vancouver Island to Prince Rupert. It was the flagship of the fleet until Queen of the North was added to the run in 1980.

The designer of the vessel was Danish naval architecture firm Knud E. Hansen. The keel was laid down on November 30, 1964 and the ship launched on October 15, 1965. The launching did not proceed without incident. The traditional smashing of a champagne bottle against the hull was to be performed by the wife of the Speaker of the Legislature, W H Murray. Moments before, however, a young boy ran across the dock and tripped over the rope which restrained the chains holding the vessel to the ways. Instead of being launched by the pull of a lever, Queen of Prince Rupert was sent down the ways prematurely by accident.

Mrs. Murray belatedly pulled a second lever to propel the champagne bottle, but it missed the boat. Harold Husband, president of VMD, grabbed the bottle on its return swing and tried to smash it against the hull, but the bottle only bounced off. Then the winds pushed the unpowered vessel directly towards a grain dock. Nearby tugboats quickly moved in to keep Queen of Prince Rupert out of danger. To ensure that there would be no bad luck associated with an improperly christened ship, Mrs. Murray later "threw another bottle of bubbly at the frisky ferry" as it lay tied up to a pier.

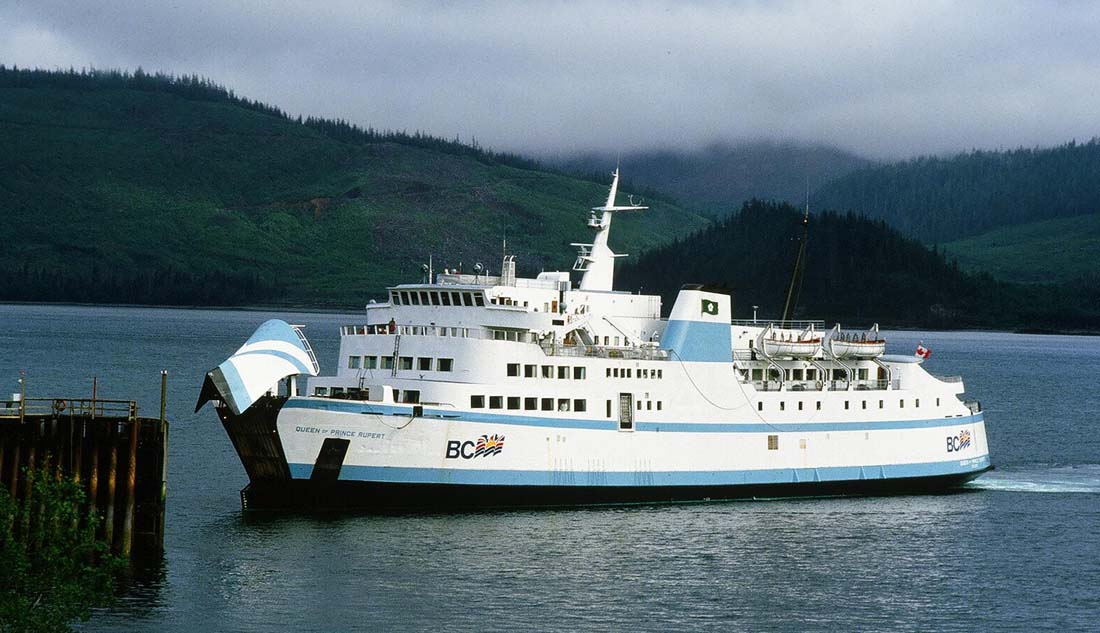
Queen of Prince Rupert in July 1984

From 1966 to 1979, the route operated from Kelsey Bay, the northern limit of the highway system on Vancouver Island at the time.

In its inaugural year, Queen of Prince Rupert made the journey in 20 hours, departing at 1:30 pm from Prince Rupert and Kelsey Bay on alternate days. A one-way fare was $30, while the cost for an automobile and driver was $60. There were 16 deluxe state rooms on the Bridge Deck, with two berths, shower and bathroom ($11.50 per berth); 22 outside and 55 inside semi-deluxe state rooms on the Promenade Deck, with bathroom ($10.00 and $8.50 per berth); and on the Lower Deck or Tween Deck; 30 two-berth state rooms (5.50 per berth) and 9 four-berth rooms ($18 for the room). Public showers were located on the Tween deck.

In the 1977–1978 season, passenger rates were still $30 between Kelsey Bay and Prince Rupert, while cars were $40 alone. A notable change to the route was made that season during the fall to spring schedule. The ship departed from Tsawwassen, enabling northerners to travel directly from Prince Rupert to Vancouver by sea. On the October–April schedule, the ship left Tsawwassen Mondays at 8:00 am, stopping at Kelsey Bay and Bella Bella, arriving at Prince Rupert at 6:00 pm Tuesday. Turnaround time was quick, as it departed for the south again at 10:30 pm, reaching Tsawwassen at 6:30 am Thursday. The Thursday to Sunday run called in at Ocean Falls.

In 1979, the North Island Highway was completed through to Port Hardy, and a new terminal built at nearby Bear Cove. In 1980, Queen of the North entered service on the Inside Passage route. The British Columbia government decided to utilize Queen of Prince Rupert on the tourist run from Victoria to Seattle, replacing the coastal steamship Princess Marguerite. In what was seen by many as a politically expedient move, they leased Queen of Prince Rupert to the BC Steamship Corporation when Princess Marguerite was found to violate US pollution requirements. The vessel was renamed Victoria Princess. To enable loading at Victoria's Inner Harbour, a side-loading door was installed. Victoria Princess only operated on the route for one summer, however, and in November, 1980, returned to the BC Ferries fleet as Queen of Prince Rupert to begin its service between Prince Rupert and Skidegate.

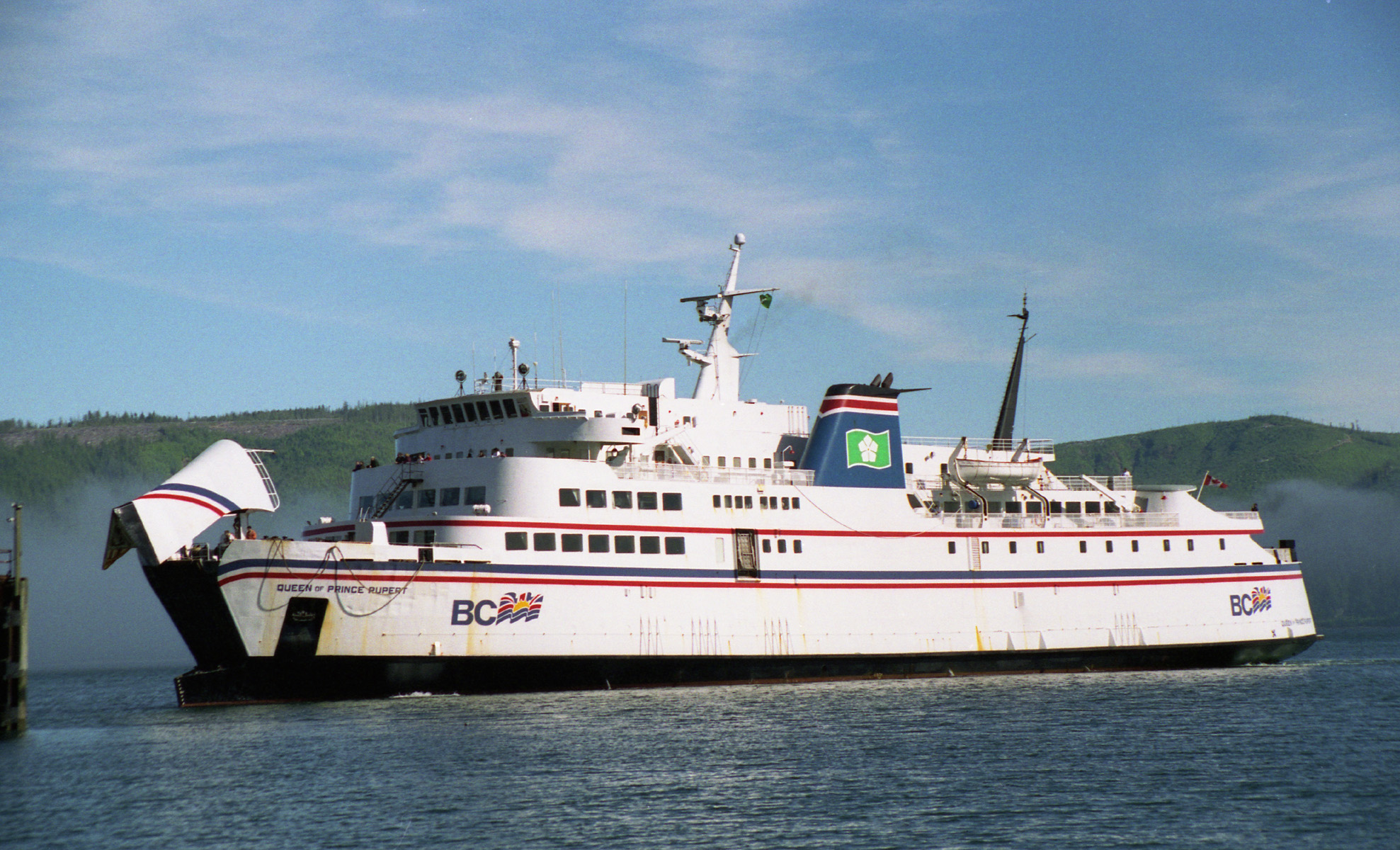
Queen of Prince Rupert in 2006

When Queen of the North sank on March 22, 2006, Queen of Prince Rupert was in drydock undergoing its annual refit. She was quickly pressed back into service, and made her first voyage of the season less than a month later. On April 20, 2006, the vessel made her first crossing through Wright Sound where her sister ship had sunk. Queen of Prince Rupert stopped at the spot and passengers threw into the water 99 white roses (the number of people rescued) and two red roses (for the two people missing and presumed dead). Queen of Prince Rupert continued covering both the Inside Passage and Queen Charlotte Islands routes until the replacement Northern Adventure was ready for service in March 2007. This necessitated considerably reduced service in the busy summer tourism season, and had a significant effect on the economies of coastal communities.

Previous to the Queen of the North disaster, crew quarters on both vessels were below the waterline, beneath the car deck. Passenger state rooms below the waterline had not been used for a number of years, but the crew's bunks and mess continued in use. Immediately after the sinking, however, the passenger cabins on Queen of Prince Rupert's Promenade deck were given over to the crew, greatly reducing the number of state rooms available to travellers, but ensuring the safety of the crew.

Queen of Prince Rupert was decommissioned at a ceremony in Prince Rupert on April 20, 2009. The new Northern Expedition as well as the newly purchased Northern Adventure (which is Queen of Prince Rupert's replacement on the Prince Rupert–Skidegate route) were present along with Queen of Prince Rupert in Prince Rupert Harbour on April 19, 2009, marking the only time to date that all three vessels were in the same location together.

Preceded by (New creation)	BC Ferries northern flagship 1966–1980	Succeeded by Queen of the North
