= Northern campaign =

Northern campaign may refer to:

- Northern campaign (Irish Republican Army), attempts by the IRA to destabilise Northern Ireland between 1942 and 1944
- Northern France campaign (1944), the campaign immediately after American troops broke out from the Normandy beachhead in World War II
- Northern Virginia campaign, a series of battles fought in Virginia during 1862 in the American Civil War
- Northern Tavriya Campaign, a 1920 military campaign of the Russian Civil War
- War in the North, the northern campaign during the Spanish Civil War (1937)

== See also ==
- Northern Expedition
- Northern Expeditions (disambiguation)
