= MV Northern Adventure =

Ferry in British Columbia, Canada

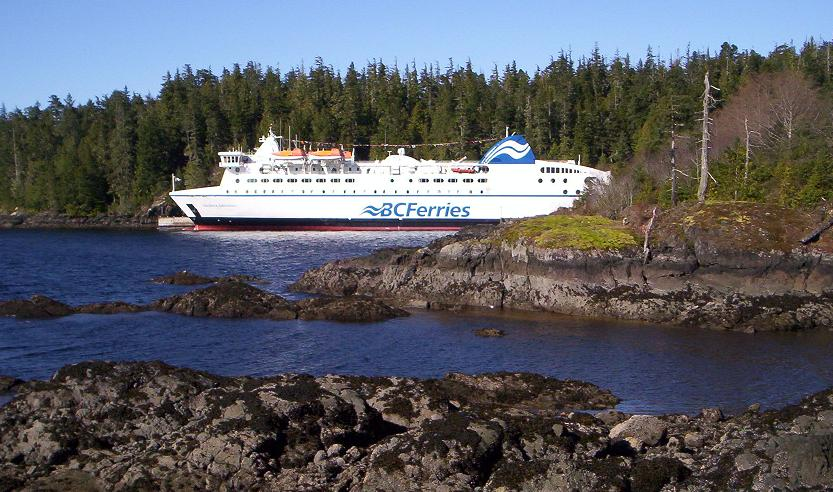
- MV Northern Adventure

History
- Name: Adamantios Korais (during construction); Sonia (2004–2006); Northern Adventure (2006–present)
- Owner: Tomasos Transporto & Tourism (TTT Lines) Naples, Italy (2004–2006); BC Ferries (2006–present)
- Operator: International Shipping Partners (2004–2006); BC Ferries (2006–present)
- Port of registry: (The Bahamas) Nassau (2004–2006); (Canada) Victoria (2006–present)
- Builder: Atsalakis Yards, Perama, Greece
- Laid down: 11 September 2001
- Launched: 19 October 2002
- Completed: 19 July 2004
- In service: 2004
- Identification: IMO number: 9257735; MMSI number: 316194000; Callsign: CFN4641
- Status: In service

General characteristics
- Type: RORO ferry
- Tonnage: 9,925 GT; 3,337 NT; 1,640 DWT
- Displacement: 5,983 t (5,889 long tons)
- Length: 117 m (383 ft 10 in) oa; 111.9 m (367 ft 2 in) pp
- Beam: 20.0 m (65 ft 7 in)
- Draught: 4.7 m (15 ft 5 in)
- Propulsion: 2 × diesel engines, 15,993 kW (21,447 hp)
- Speed: 22 knots (41 km/h; 25 mph)
- Capacity: Passengers and crew: 500; Vehicles: 87 cars

MV Northern Adventure is a roll-on/roll-off (RORO) ferry operated by BC Ferries in British Columbia, Canada. She sails two routes: the scenic Inside Passage route between Port Hardy and Prince Rupert and the Haida Gwaii crossing between Prince Rupert and Skidegate. The vessel was laid down by Atsalakis-Sidironaftiki shipyard on 11 September 2001 at their yard in Perama, Greece. The ship was launched on 19 October 2002 under the name Adamantios Korais. However, construction was delayed and the vessel was not completed until 19 July 2004 under the name Sonia, and later Sonia X. The ferry was chartered by the Government of Trinidad and Tobago for use on a route between Port of Spain, Trinidad and Scarborough, Tobago. In 2006, the ferry was acquired by BC Ferries and entered service under her current name Northern Adventure in 2007.

== Description ==
Northern Adventure is a roll-on/roll-off (RORO) ferry. The vessel measures 117 metres (383 ft 10 in) long overall and 111.9 m (367 ft 2 in) between perpendiculars with a beam of 20.0 m (65 ft 7 in) and a draught of 4.7 m (15 ft 5 in). The ferry was assessed at 9,925 gross tonnage (GT), 3,337 net tonnage (NT) and 1,640 tons deadweight (DWT) with a displacement of 5,983 t (5,889 long tons).

The vessel is powered by two diesel engines creating 15,993 kW (21,447 hp). Initially the ferry had a maximum speed of 22 knots (41 km/h; 25 mph), but this later declined to 20.5 knots (38.0 km/h; 23.6 mph) in BC Ferries' service. In early service the vessel was authorised to carry between 1,200 and 1,026 passengers and had capacity for 150 vehicles. In BC Ferries' service, the ship has capacity for 500 passengers and crew and 87 vehicles. In BC Ferries service, the vessel has various amenities including but not limited to a Raven Lounge, a kids play area, 70 cabins, 4 staterooms and three decks accessible to passengers.

== Construction and career ==
Construction on the ship began in Greece on 11 September 2001 by Atsalakis-Sidironaftiki shipyard at their yard in Perama. The vessel was launched on 19 October 2002 with the name of Adamantios Korais. Due to unspecified delays during construction of the hull, work was delayed, and construction was not completed until 19 July 2004 and entered service as Sonia. During the construction period, one of the engines suffered a catastrophic failure. The ship was first chartered by the Port Authority of Trinidad and Tobago to run the route between Port of Spain, Trinidad, and Scarborough, Tobago beginning in December 2004. Sonia was brought in to replace the ageing ferry Beauport and to support the fleet's other ferry Panorama. Ship operations were managed by International Shipping Partners. However, before beginning service, the Port Authority discovered 14 defects aboard the ship that required rectification before Sonia could sail. The ship suffered further breakdowns and had an engine explode. In 2006, the ship was renamed Sonia X. The ferry then operated out of Barcelona, Spain on a run to Ibiza. The ferry was purchased by BC Ferries in September 2006 in a deal worth €35.7 million, or $50.6 million CAD. Sonia was acquired to replace the ferry Queen of the North which sank after running aground in March 2006.

=== BC Ferries service ===
The ship was painted in BC Ferries livery and sailed from Greece to Victoria, British Columbia via the Panama Canal. The vessel arrived at the Victoria shipyards on 18 December 2006, where she underwent an $18-million refit and interior upgrade that finished in March 2007. Part of the refit was to retrofit the ferry's stern loading ramp to match the dockside facilities at BC Ferries terminals.

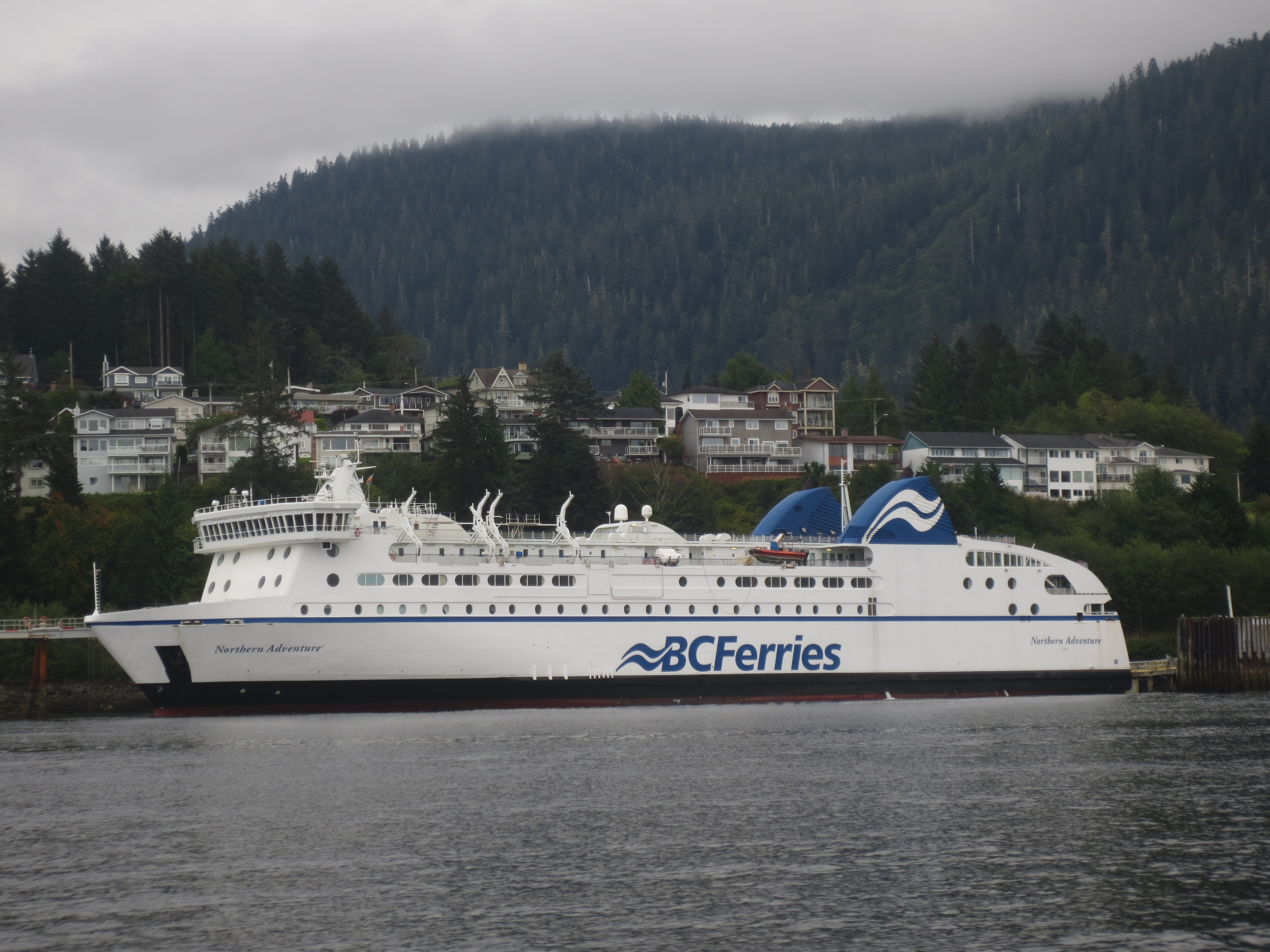
Northern Adventure docked at the Prince Rupert ferry terminal.

Upon entering service Northern Adventure in April 2007 initially replaced Queen of the North on the Inside Passage route. However, when Northern Expedition entered service in early 2009, Queen of Prince Rupert was decommissioned and Northern Adventure was reassigned to replace Queen of Prince Rupert and her Haida Gwaii duties. Northern Adventure sails two routes: the scenic Inside Passage route between Port Hardy and Prince Rupert and the Haida Gwaii crossing between Prince Rupert and Skidegate.

== Citations ==
Preceded by Queen of the North	BC Ferries northern flagship 2007–present (with MV Northern Expedition)	Succeeded by (incumbent)
