= North Saanich =

- District municipality
- District of North Saanich
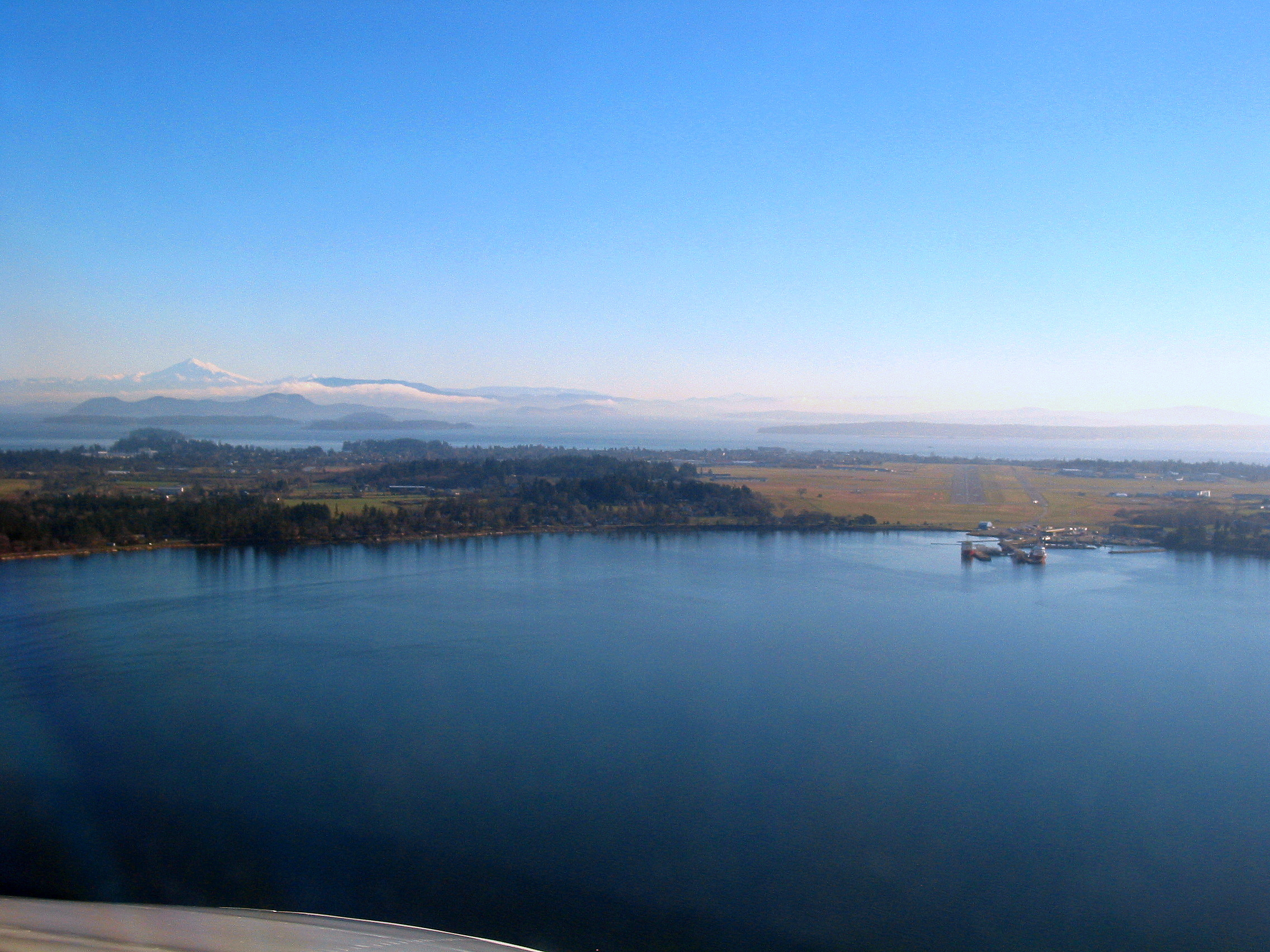
- Motto: Eetsun-Hunnumut "The land where it is good to be"
- Location of North Saanich within the Capital Regional District

- Location of District of North Saanich within the Capital District in British Columbia, Canada North Saanich (British Columbia)
- Coordinates: 48°36′51″N 123°25′12″W
- Country: Canada
- Province: British Columbia
- Regional district: Capital
- Electoral district (federal): Saanich—Gulf Islands
- Electoral district (provincial): Saanich North and the Islands
- Incorporated: 1965

Government
  - Governing body: North Saanich Municipal Council
  - Mayor: Jack McClintock
  - MP: Elizabeth May (Green)
  - MLA: Emily Lowan (BC Green)

Area
  - Land: 37.16 km^{2} (14.35 sq mi)
- Elevation: 23 m (75 ft)

Population (2021)
  - Total: 12,235
  - Density: 329.2/km^{2} (853/sq mi)
- Time zone: UTC−07:00 (PT)
- Highways: 17
- Website: www.northsaanich.ca

The District of North Saanich is located on the Saanich Peninsula of British Columbia, approximately 25 kilometres (16 mi) north of Victoria on southern Vancouver Island. It is one of the 13 Greater Victoria municipalities. The district is surrounded on three sides by 20 km (12 mi) of ocean shoreline, and consists of rural/residential areas and a large agricultural base. It is home to the Victoria International Airport and the Swartz Bay Ferry Terminal.

== History ==
In July 1905, North Saanich, then including the townsite of Sidney, was incorporated with the original Municipal Hall located in Sidney. Lacking population and a firm tax base, the municipality was dissolved in 1911. In 1940, the site of the present Victoria International Airport was selected as a military forces base and the area boomed with the influx of 10,000 military personnel, leading to incorporation for the Village of Sidney in 1952.

Four years later, the residents of the North Saanich unorganized area, numbering 2,865, requested that letters patent be issued to form the "North Saanich Fire Prevention District" with power to own property, to tax and to borrow. In 1965, after a favourable public vote, the letters patent were withdrawn and the North Saanich Municipal District was established with offices at the present location on Mills Road.

== Geography ==
=== Climate ===
North Saanich has a warm-summer Mediterranean climate (Köppen Csb) with short, warm, and dry summers and long, cool, and wet winters.

Climate data for North Saanich (Victoria International Airport) WMO ID: 1018620; coordinates 48°38′50″N 123°25′33″W; elevation: 19.5 m (64 ft); 1991–2020 normals, extremes 1940–present
| Month | Jan | Feb | Mar | Apr | May | Jun | Jul | Aug | Sep | Oct | Nov | Dec | Year |
|---|---|---|---|---|---|---|---|---|---|---|---|---|---|
| Record high humidex | 17.4 | 17.1 | 21.1 | 26.1 | 33.6 | 34.7 | 39.6 | 36.8 | 34.7 | 27.0 | 20.0 | 17.7 | 42.6 |
| Record high °C (°F) | 16.1 (61.0) | 18.3 (64.9) | 21.4 (70.5) | 26.3 (79.3) | 31.5 (88.7) | 39.4 (102.9) | 36.3 (97.3) | 34.4 (93.9) | 31.2 (88.2) | 27.6 (81.7) | 18.3 (64.9) | 16.8 (62.2) | 39.4 (102.9) |
| Mean daily maximum °C (°F) | 7.5 (45.5) | 8.7 (47.7) | 10.8 (51.4) | 13.7 (56.7) | 17.5 (63.5) | 20.2 (68.4) | 22.7 (72.9) | 22.6 (72.7) | 19.7 (67.5) | 14.3 (57.7) | 9.9 (49.8) | 7.3 (45.1) | 14.6 (58.3) |
| Daily mean °C (°F) | 4.6 (40.3) | 5.0 (41.0) | 6.8 (44.2) | 9.1 (48.4) | 12.6 (54.7) | 15.2 (59.4) | 17.2 (63.0) | 17.1 (62.8) | 14.5 (58.1) | 10.2 (50.4) | 6.5 (43.7) | 4.4 (39.9) | 10.3 (50.5) |
| Mean daily minimum °C (°F) | 1.6 (34.9) | 1.4 (34.5) | 2.7 (36.9) | 4.6 (40.3) | 7.6 (45.7) | 10.1 (50.2) | 11.7 (53.1) | 11.6 (52.9) | 9.2 (48.6) | 6.0 (42.8) | 3.0 (37.4) | 1.5 (34.7) | 5.9 (42.6) |
| Record low °C (°F) | −15.6 (3.9) | −15.0 (5.0) | −10.0 (14.0) | −3.9 (25.0) | −1.1 (30.0) | 2.1 (35.8) | 4.1 (39.4) | 4.4 (39.9) | −1.1 (30.0) | −4.4 (24.1) | −13.3 (8.1) | −14.4 (6.1) | −15.6 (3.9) |
| Record low wind chill | −19.1 | −23.7 | −13.9 | −6.7 | −5.3 | 0.0 | 0.0 | 0.0 | 0.0 | −9.1 | −19.4 | −25.1 | −25.1 |
| Average precipitation mm (inches) | 155.3 (6.11) | 84.5 (3.33) | 79.9 (3.15) | 48.2 (1.90) | 36.5 (1.44) | 29.2 (1.15) | 19.5 (0.77) | 24.2 (0.95) | 35.7 (1.41) | 96.1 (3.78) | 146.0 (5.75) | 146.1 (5.75) | 901.2 (35.48) |
| Average rainfall mm (inches) | 144.2 (5.68) | 78.5 (3.09) | 76.3 (3.00) | 47.7 (1.88) | 36.5 (1.44) | 29.2 (1.15) | 19.5 (0.77) | 24.2 (0.95) | 35.7 (1.41) | 95.9 (3.78) | 141.8 (5.58) | 137.0 (5.39) | 866.6 (34.12) |
| Average snowfall cm (inches) | 11.2 (4.4) | 7.1 (2.8) | 3.7 (1.5) | 0.5 (0.2) | 0.0 (0.0) | 0.0 (0.0) | 0.0 (0.0) | 0.0 (0.0) | 0.0 (0.0) | 0.2 (0.1) | 3.6 (1.4) | 12.4 (4.9) | 38.6 (15.2) |
| Average precipitation days (≥ 0.2 mm) | 19.8 | 15.2 | 17.0 | 13.7 | 11.6 | 9.5 | 5.4 | 5.5 | 8.0 | 14.1 | 18.9 | 19.4 | 158.1 |
| Average rainy days (≥ 0.2 mm) | 18.9 | 14.5 | 16.8 | 13.7 | 11.6 | 9.5 | 5.4 | 5.5 | 8.0 | 14.0 | 18.5 | 19.0 | 155.5 |
| Average snowy days (≥ 0.2 cm) | 2.0 | 1.6 | 1.2 | 0.1 | 0.0 | 0.0 | 0.0 | 0.0 | 0.0 | 0.0 | 0.9 | 1.7 | 7.4 |
| Average relative humidity (%) (at 1500 LST) | 78.4 | 69.9 | 65.3 | 60.5 | 58.4 | 56.3 | 55.4 | 56.4 | 60.7 | 69.7 | 76.6 | 79.3 | 65.6 |
| Mean monthly sunshine hours | 70.8 | 95.5 | 145.3 | 191.3 | 241.5 | 251.7 | 318.1 | 297.5 | 228.6 | 136.9 | 72.8 | 58.9 | 2,108.8 |
| Percentage possible sunshine | 26 | 33.3 | 39.5 | 46.7 | 51.2 | 52.2 | 65.4 | 66.9 | 60.3 | 40.7 | 26.2 | 22.7 | 44.3 |
Source: Environment and Climate Change Canada (June maximum) (sun 1981–2010)

== Demographics ==
In the 2021 Canadian census conducted by Statistics Canada, North Saanich had a population of 12,235 living in 5,010 of its 5,235 total private dwellings, a change of 8.8% from its 2016 population of 11,249. With a land area of 37.16 km^{2} (14.35 sq mi), it had a population density of 329.3/km^{2} (852.8/sq mi) in 2021.

Historical census populations – North Saanich

| Year | Pop. | ±% |
|---|---|---|
| 1966 | 2,891 | — |
| 1971 | 3,601 | +24.6% |
| 1976 | 4,697 | +30.4% |
| 1981 | 6,117 | +30.2% |
| 1986 | 7,247 | +18.5% |
| 1991 | 9,645 | +33.1% |

| Year | Pop. | ±% |
|---|---|---|
| 1996 | 10,411 | +7.9% |
| 2001 | 10,436 | +0.2% |
| 2006 | 10,823 | +3.7% |
| 2011 | 11,089 | +2.5% |
| 2016 | 11,249 | +1.4% |
| 2021 | 12,235 | +8.8% |

Source: Statistics Canada

=== Ethnicity ===
Panethnic groups in the District of North Saanich (2001−2021)
| Panethnic group | 2021 | | 2016 | | 2011 | | 2006 | | 2001 | |
| Panethnic group | Pop. | % | Pop. | % | Pop. | % | Pop. | % | Pop. | % |
|---|---|---|---|---|---|---|---|---|---|---|
| European (Note: Statistic includes all persons that did not make up part of a visible minority or an indigenous identity.) | 11,060 | 90.73% | 10,395 | 92.85% | 10,300 | 93.47% | 10,125 | 93.97% | 10,020 | 96.25% |
| Indigenous | 340 | 2.79% | 190 | 1.7% | 205 | 1.86% | 125 | 1.16% | 60 | 0.58% |
| South Asian | 275 | 2.26% | 145 | 1.3% | 115 | 1.04% | 60 | 0.56% | 40 | 0.38% |
| East Asian (Note: Statistic includes total responses of "Chinese", "Korean", and "Japanese" under visible minority section on census.) | 260 | 2.13% | 220 | 1.97% | 220 | 2% | 280 | 2.6% | 130 | 1.25% |
| Southeast Asian (Note: Statistic includes total responses of "Filipino" and "Southeast Asian" under visible minority section on census.) | 135 | 1.11% | 120 | 1.07% | 110 | 1% | 15 | 0.14% | 35 | 0.34% |
| African | 45 | 0.37% | 60 | 0.54% | 20 | 0.18% | 75 | 0.7% | 45 | 0.43% |
| Latin American | 35 | 0.29% | 20 | 0.18% | 0 | 0% | 35 | 0.32% | 20 | 0.19% |
| Middle Eastern (Note: Statistic includes total responses of "West Asian" and "Arab" under visible minority section on census.) | 10 | 0.08% | 10 | 0.09% | 0 | 0% | 55 | 0.51% | 0 | 0% |
| Other/multiracial (Note: Statistic includes total responses of "Visible minority, n.i.e." and "Multiple visible minorities" under visible minority section on census.) | 20 | 0.16% | 35 | 0.31% | 0 | 0% | 10 | 0.09% | 55 | 0.53% |
| Total responses | 12,190 | 99.63% | 11,195 | 99.52% | 11,020 | 99.38% | 10,775 | 99.56% | 10,410 | 99.75% |
| Total population | 12,235 | 100% | 11,249 | 100% | 11,089 | 100% | 10,823 | 100% | 10,436 | 100% |
Note: Totals greater than 100% due to multiple origin responses.

=== Religion ===
According to the 2021 census, religious groups in North Saanich included:

- Irreligion (6,910 persons or 56.7%)
- Christianity (4,905 persons or 40.2%)
- Sikhism (150 persons or 1.2%)
- Buddhism (100 persons or 0.8%)
- Judaism (20 persons or 0.2%)
- Other (110 persons or 0.9%)

== Government ==
The 2026-2030 council is:

- Mayor: Jack McClintock
- Councilors:
  - Jane Burnes
  - Phillip DiBattista
  - Walter Langer
  - Stuart Mackinnon
  - Brian Robinson
  - Jim Woolford

== Attractions ==
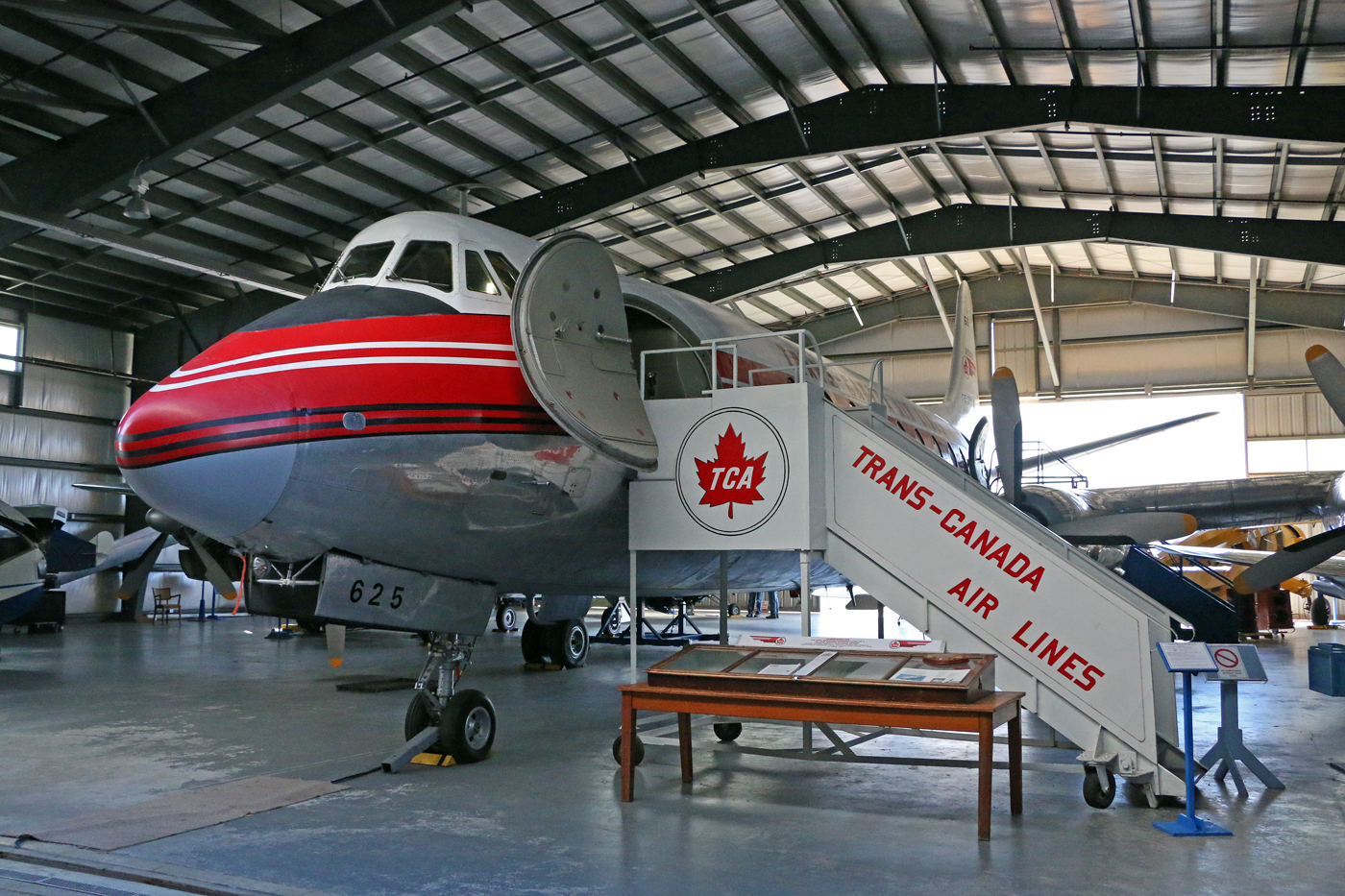
British Columbia Aviation Museum

- North Saanich Farm Market
- British Columbia Aviation Museum
- Institute of Ocean Sciences
- North Saanich Freeride Park
- 443 Maritime Helicopter Squadron (Canadian Forces)
- Panorama Recreation Centre

== Notable people ==
- Muriel Wylie Blanchet, travel writer (1891–1961) best known for The Curve of Time, lived on Curteis Point in North Saanich.
