= MV Northern Expedition =

Ferry in British Columbia, Canada

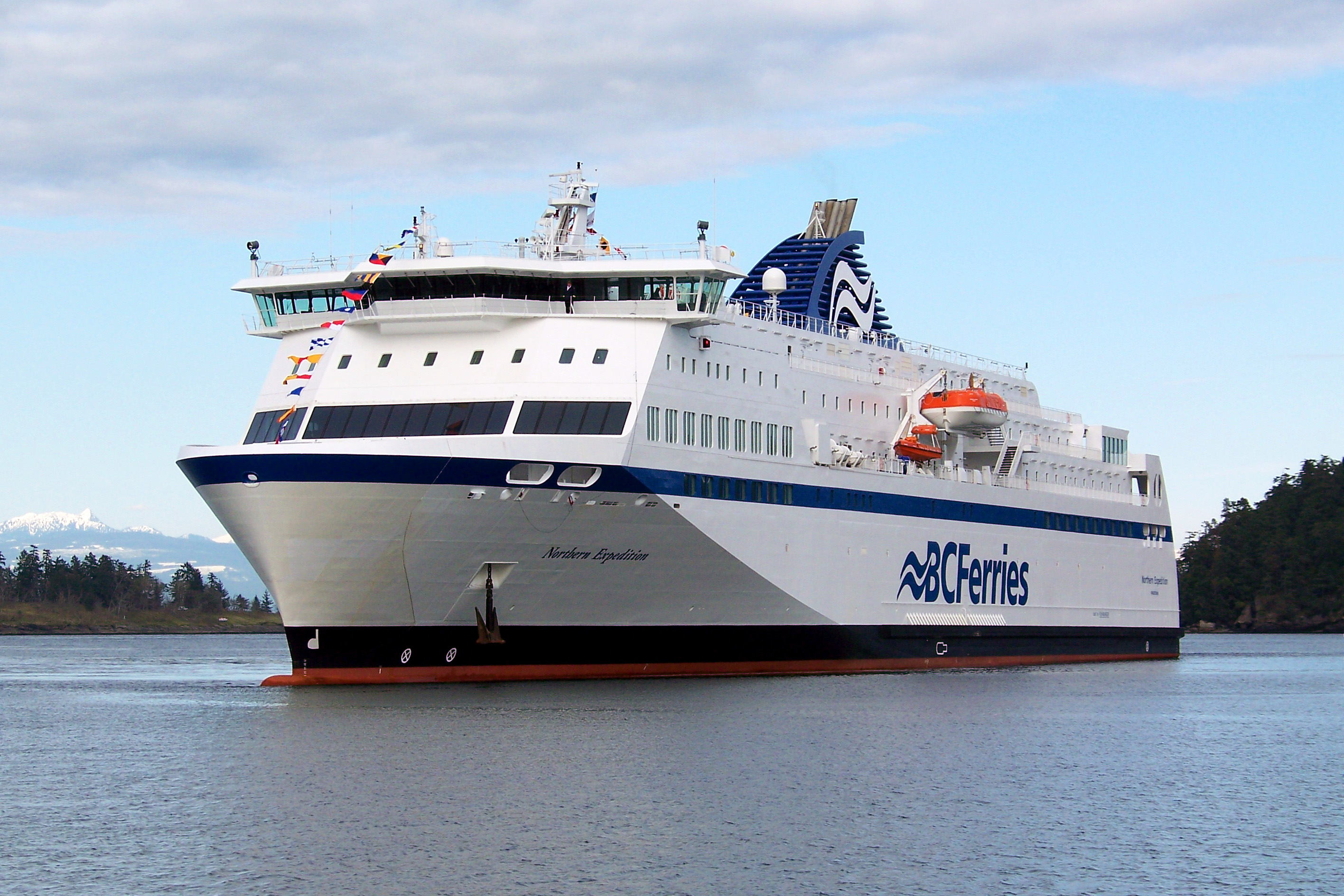
- Northern Expedition on March 6, 2009

History

Saint Vincent and the Grenadines
- Name: Northern Expedition
- Port of registry: Kingstown
- Ordered: August 18, 2006
- Builder: Flensburger Schiffbau-Gesellschaft shipyard
- Cost: CA$133 million
- Laid down: June 16, 2008
- Launched: September 25, 2008
- Completed: January 29, 2009
- Maiden voyage: January 30, 2009
- Out of service: March 12, 2009
- Identification: IMO number: 9408413
- Status: change of flag to Canada

Canada
- Name: Northern Expedition
- Operator: British Columbia Ferry Services Inc.
- Port of registry: Victoria, British Columbia
- Acquired: March 12, 2009
- In service: May 18, 2009
- Identification: IMO number: 9408413; MMSI number: 316014054; Callsign: CFN5364; ON: 833401; ABS: 09181931
- Status: in service

General characteristics
- Type: Ferry/cargo ship
- Tonnage: 17,729 GT; 5,318 NT
- Displacement: 8,187 t (8,058 long tons)
- Length: 142.3 m (466 ft 10 in) pp; 150.75 m (494 ft 7 in) oa
- Beam: 23 m (75 ft 6 in)
- Depth: 7.55 m (24 ft 9 in)
- Installed power: 3 × 1,543.25 kW auxiliary diesel generators; 2 × 3,087.5 kW shaft generators;
- Propulsion: Two MaK 9M32C 4,500 kW (6,000 hp) main diesel engines
- Speed: 21 knots (39 km/h; 24 mph)
- Capacity: Passengers: 600; 55 staterooms; Vehicles; 130 cars

MV Northern Expedition is a roll-on/roll-off (RORO) ferry operated by BC Ferries in British Columbia, Canada. She sails daily on the Inside Passage route connecting Prince Rupert and Port Hardy.

== History ==
On August 18, 2006, BC Ferries awarded the contract to build a replacement vessel for Queen of Prince Rupert to Flensburger Schiffbau-Gesellschaft shipyard in Flensburg, Germany (the same shipyard awarded the contract for the three new Coastal-class ferries). Shortly thereafter it was determined that the new ship would be named Northern Expedition and that BC Ferries' other northern vessel (the recently purchased Sonia, the replacement for the sunken Queen of the North would be named Northern Adventure.

The keel of the vessel was laid on June 16, 2008 and she was launched on September 25, 2008. Sea trials took place in the Baltic Sea east from Danish island Bornholm between January 7–9, 2009. The vessel left Germany on January 30, 2009, bound for British Columbia via the Panama Canal. Northern Expedition completed her 9,900-nautical-mile (18,300 km; 11,400 mi) journey on March 6, 2009, passing Victoria and Vancouver before arriving in Departure Bay at Nanaimo for post-voyage inspection.

Northern Expedition entered service on May 18, 2009, along the Inside Passage route between Prince Rupert and Port Hardy. She joined Northern Adventure in BC Ferries' northern fleet and allowed for the retirement of Queen of Prince Rupert.

== Amenities ==
Northern Expedition's four passenger decks feature:

- 55 staterooms
- the Canoe Cafe
- the Vista Restaurant
- the reserved seating Aurora Lounge
- the Raven Lounge, which features 3 large-screen TV's
- the Passages Gift Shop
- a children's play area
- multiple non-reserved seating lounges

Preceded by Queen of the North	BC Ferries northern flagship 2007–present (with Northern Adventure)	Succeeded by (incumbent)
