= Arthur Passage =

Channel off the coast of British Columbia, Canada

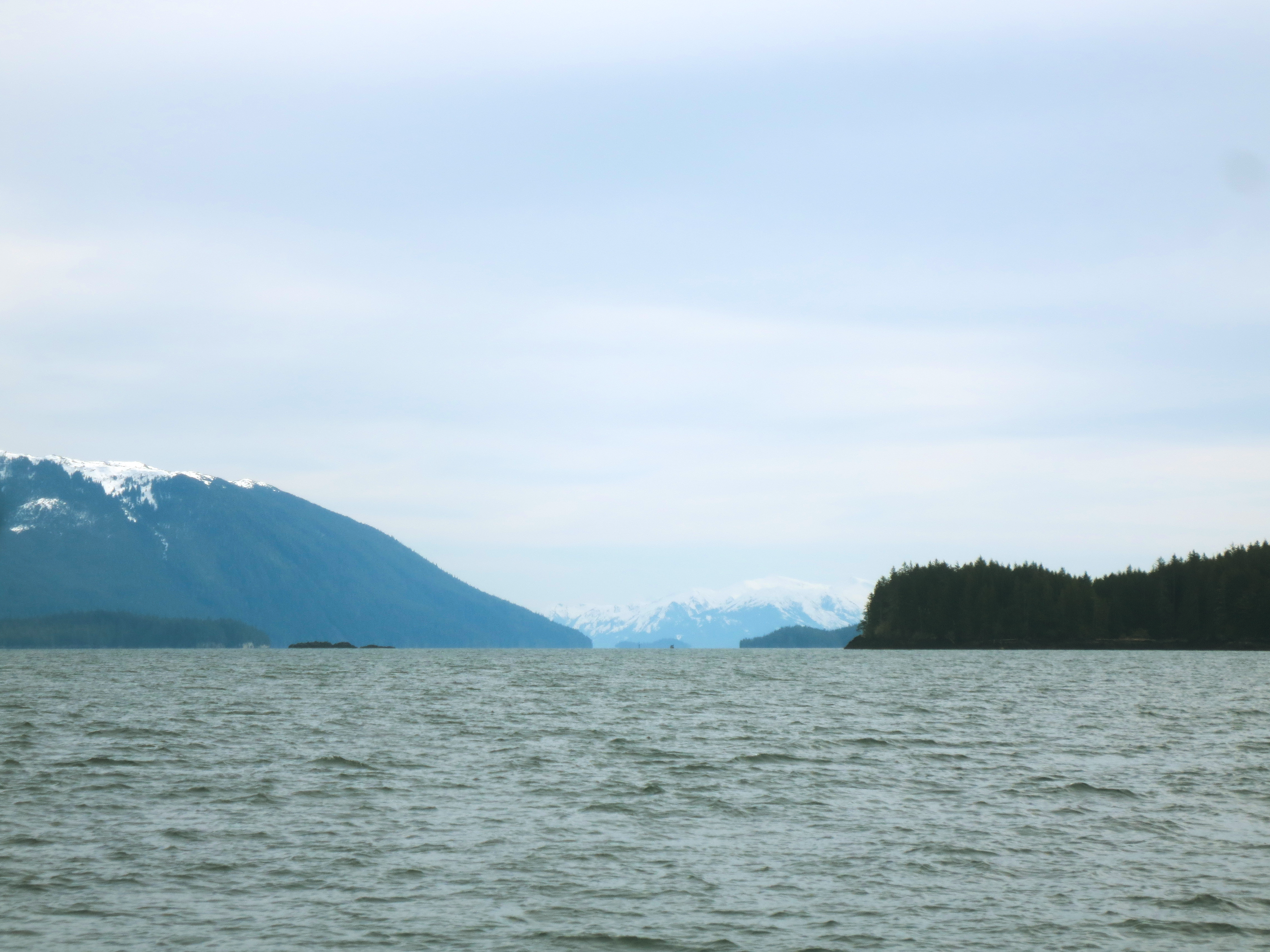
- Looking southward down Arthur Passage

- Location within British Columbia
- Coordinates: 54°01′45″N 130°14′21″W

Arthur Passage is a marine waterway in British Columbia, Canada. It is part of the Inside Passage connecting Grenville Channel (at its southeast end) with Malacca Passage (at its northwest end). A significant feature is Hanmer Island, located in the middle of the north end of the passage.

== Name origin ==
Arthur Passage was named in 1867 by Captain Daniel Pender, RN, after the third governor of Vancouver Island, Arthur E. Kennedy.

== Ecology ==
The hyper-maritime forests surrounding Arthur Passage have extensive areas of wet, slow-growing forests of western redcedar and yellow-cedar. Macrofauna in the forest floor of Hanmer Island include Sowbugs, Millipedes, Centipedes, Potworms and Earthworms.

== Hydrology ==
The Arthur Passage flood tide sets northerly and the ebb sets southerly, tidal currents attain 2.5 knots (4.6 km/h; 2.9 mph) near Hanmer Island.

== History ==
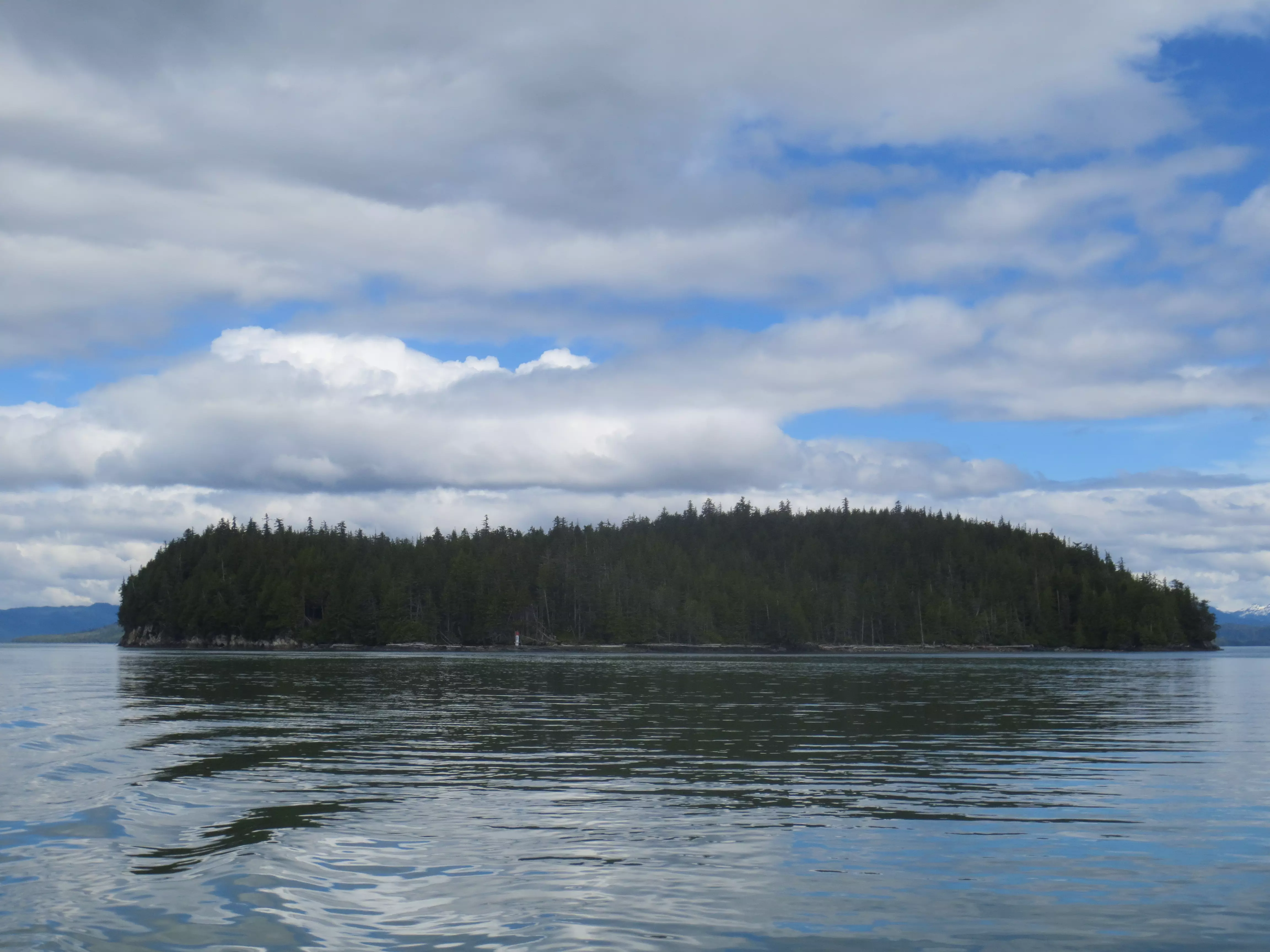
West side of Hanmer Island, British Columbia, Canada

In the morning of January 14, 1942, the American troopship USAT David W. Branch, carrying 350 passengers, went aground on Hammer Island.

== See also ==
- Inside Passage
- Chatham Sound
- Skeena River
