= MV Queen of the North =

British Columbian ferry

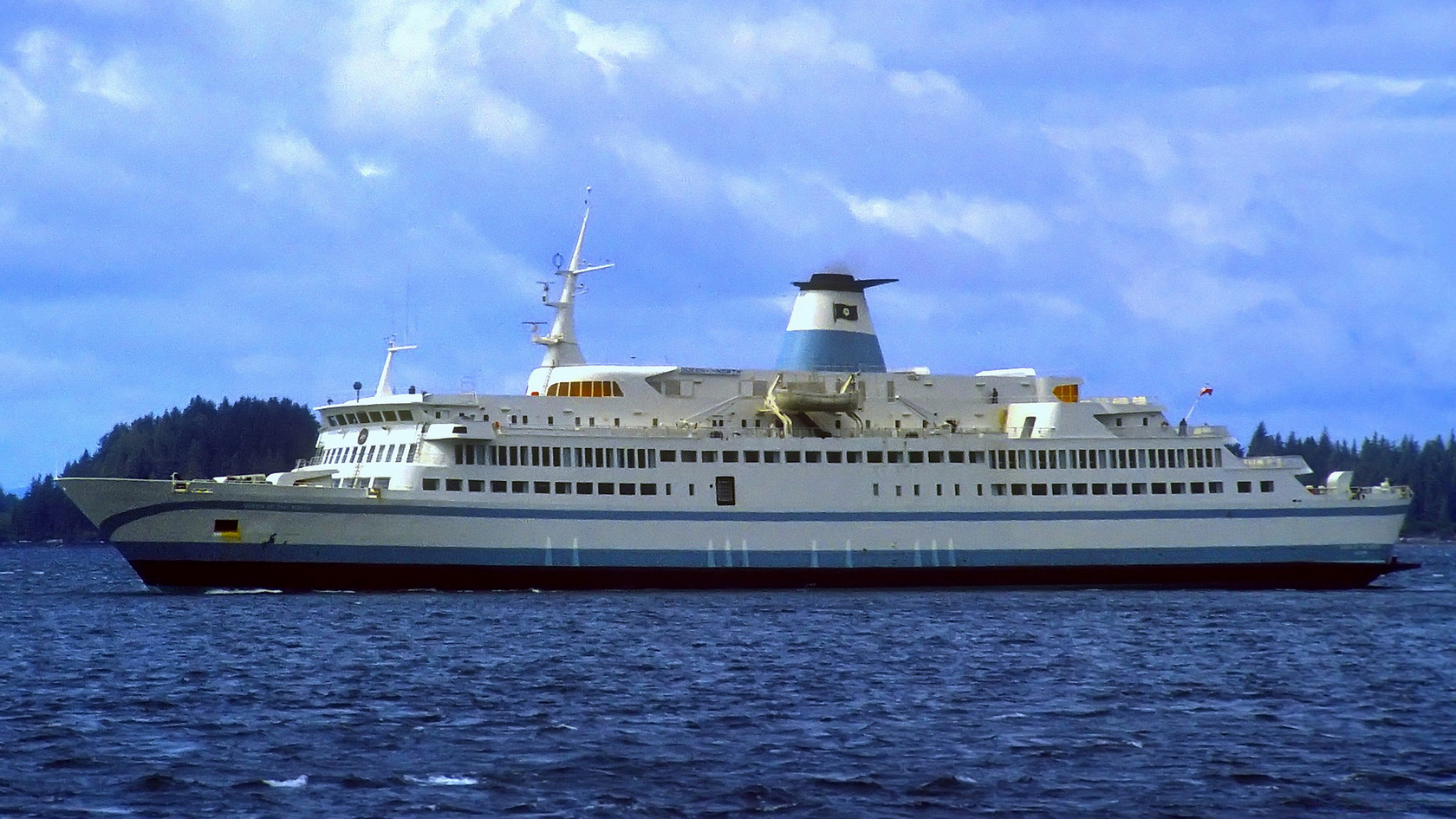
- MV Queen of the North

History

Sweden
- Name: Stena Danica
- Owner: Stena Line
- Port of registry: Sweden
- Route: Gothenburg, Sweden and Frederikshavn
- Builder: AG Weser Bremerhaven, Germany
- Launched: February 16, 1969
- Acquired: June 28, 1969
- Fate: Sold to BC Ferries for CAD $13.8 million in April 1974

Canada
- Name: Queen of Surrey
- Owner: BC Ferries
- Port of registry: (Canada) Victoria, British Columbia
- Route: Horseshoe Bay – Departure Bay
- Acquired: April 1974
- Out of service: 1976 to 1980
- Fate: Ship was refit and renamed.

Canada
- Name: Queen of the North
- Owner: BC Ferries
- Port of registry: (Canada) Victoria, British Columbia
- Route: Inside Passage: Port Hardy – Prince Rupert; Hecate Strait: Prince Rupert – Skidegate; Discovery Coast: Port Hardy – Bella Coola
- Out of service: March 22 2006
- Identification: IMO number: 6917267
- Fate: Sank on March 22, 2006. Ship's final position is 53°19.917′N 129°14.729′W

General characteristics
- Class & type: RORO ferry
- Tonnage: 8,806 gross register tons (GRT)
- Length: 125 m (410 ft 1 1/4 in)
- Beam: 19.74 m (64 ft 9 1/8 in)
- Draft: 5.24 m (17 ft 2 1/4 in)
- Propulsion: 2 × MAN V40/54 diesels
- Speed: 20 knots (23 mph; 37 km/h)
- Capacity: Passengers: 700; Car capacity: 115

MV Queen of the North was a roll-on/roll-off (RORO) ferry built by AG Weser of Germany and operated by BC Ferries, which ran along an 18-hour route along the British Columbia Coast of Canada between Port Hardy and Prince Rupert, British Columbia, a route also known as the Inside Passage. On March 22, 2006, with 101 people aboard, she failed to make a planned course change, ran aground and sank (around 1400 ft). Two passengers, whose bodies were never found, died in the incident. The ship had a gross register tonnage of 8,806 (the fifth largest in fleet), and an overall length of 125 metres (410 ft) (14th longest in the fleet). She had a capacity of 700 passengers and 115 cars.

== History ==
=== Construction and service with Stena Line ===
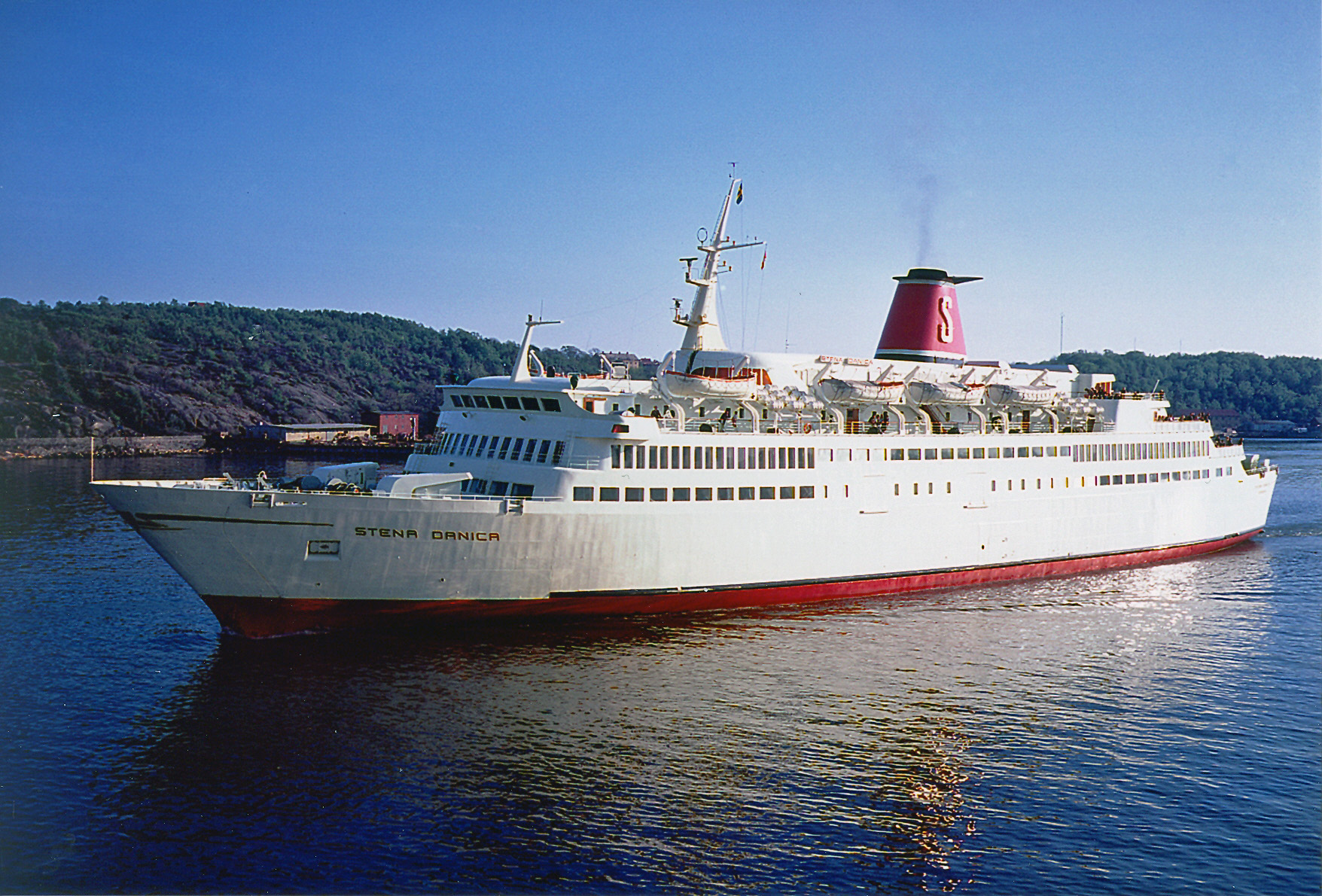
MV Stena Danica in 1969

The ship was built by AG Weser, Bremerhaven, Germany in 1969, and was originally operated by Stena Line as Stena Danica on the route between Gothenburg (Sweden) and Frederikshavn (Denmark). She was sold to BC Ferries for CAD $13.875 million. With federal import duties the initial cost of the ship to B.C. ferries was $17.7 million.

=== With BC Ferries ===
After purchasing Stena Danica from the Stena Line, the ship was rechristened Queen of Surrey by then NDP Minister of Transportation and Communications, Robert Strachan, in April 1974. Queen of Surrey began operating between Horseshoe Bay in West Vancouver and Nanaimo on Vancouver Island. This busy route requires 8 transits per day and due to her RORO bow design, it was quickly evident that the vessel was unsuitable for this route since she could not be loaded and unloaded as fast as necessary. The ship was decommissioned in 1976 and laid up at BC Ferries' dockyard at Deas Island in Vancouver while the government debated what to do with her.

In May 1980, after an extensive $10 million refit for longer haul, northern service (staterooms, more restaurants and cargo holds) she was renamed Queen of the North. She was assigned to the Inside Passage route between Port Hardy on Vancouver Island and Prince Rupert in north-western BC. She occasionally also served Bella Bella, Skidegate (Haida Gwaii, formerly the Queen Charlotte Islands), and several other small, north-western coastal villages. Due to the isolation of some of these communities (where roads were poor or non-existent), she served as the main source of transport, picking up residents and medical patients, and dropping off food, mail and supplies.

In 1985, she was refurbished and designated the "flagship" of BC Ferries' fleet. After the sinking of MS Estonia in 1994, BC Ferries installed a second set of internally welded doors to prevent the bow from flooding in rough seas.

During 2001, she was given a major $500,000 refit at Vancouver Shipyards, which included a redesign and modernization of the passenger decks. However, owing to her older single-hull design, the ship was not designed to survive a significant hull breach or the flooding of more than one bulkhead compartment. All newer ferries can survive flooding of at least two bulkhead compartments and because of this concern, the ship was intended to be replaced between 2009 and 2011.

=== Sinking ===
On March 22, 2006, Queen of the North sank after running aground on Gil Island in Wright Sound, 135 kilometres (73 nmi) south of Prince Rupert, British Columbia. She sank at 12:25 am or 12:43 am PST (08:43 UTC), however, there are conflicting reports about the exact time. News reports indicated that the vessel failed to make a planned course change and was at the time of the collision one kilometre away from where it should have been. She was bound for Port Hardy.

According to emergency responders, the ship took approximately an hour to sink, giving passengers time to evacuate into lifeboats. Eyewitness reports confirmed the approximate time between the incident and the sinking and also suggest that the ship sank stern first. The ship's final position is 53°19.917′N 129°14.729′W according to the BC Ferries investigation. The Canadian Hydrographic Service's electronic navigational charts show the wreck at 53°19.932′N 129°14.794′W, 77 metres (84 yd) WNW of the position cited in BC Ferries' investigation.

The ship's captain, Colin Henthorne, was off watch and asleep in his bunk at the time of the sinking. The second mate, Keven Hilton was on break, leaving the fourth mate, Karl Lilgert, in command. Quartermaster Karen Briker was piloting the ship. Local weather reports indicated winds gusting to 75 km/h (47 mph) in the vicinity of Wright Sound. According to Kevin Falcon, the BC Minister of Transportation, the autopilot equipment had been certified by Transport Canada as recently as March 2 of that year.

On March 26, 2007, BC Ferries released its internal investigation into the sinking. The report concluded that Queen of the North failed to make the required or any course changes at Sainty Point, and that the ship proceeded straight on an incorrect course for 4 nautical miles (7.4 km; 4.6 mi) over 14 minutes until its grounding at 17.5 knots (32.4 km/h; 20.1 mph) on Gil Island. The investigation found no evidence of alterations of speed at any time during the transit of Wright Sound and concluded that human factors were the primary cause of the sinking.

==== Evacuation and rescue ====
Final moments of Queen of the North

Location of Hartley Bay in British Columbia

A large number of small fishing and recreational vessels from Hartley Bay were the first on the scene to answer the distress call, arriving in a fleet of small watercraft in the dead of night to pick up survivors. Joint Rescue Coordination Centre Victoria tasked Canadian Coast Guard vessels CCGS Sir Wilfrid Laurier, CCGC Point Henry, CCGS W. E. Ricker, CCGC Kitimat II and CCGS Vector, along with two CH-149 Cormorant helicopters and one CC-115 Buffalo aircraft from the 442 Transport and Rescue Squadron at CFB Comox to the scene of the sinking.

Originally the evacuation of the ship was reported to be a smooth one; however, stories of chest high water and trapped crew members surfaced on March 24. According to the official BC Ferries press release, 99 of the 101 passengers and crew were safely evacuated with only a few minor injuries, and many of them found refuge in nearby Hartley Bay.

==== Loss of life ====
Two people, Shirley Rosette and Gerald Foisy of 100 Mile House, British Columbia, apparently failed to reach the lifeboats and died when the ship sank. While a passenger reportedly told police the missing couple were seen in Hartley Bay during the rescue effort, a thorough search of the small Gitga'at community of 120 people by police turned up nothing. In addition, the couple did not contact relatives after the sinking.

When the ferry was located by submersible, the two missing passengers were not found in the wreck.

==== BC Ferries crisis response ====
The response by BC Ferries CEO David Hahn was that, although this was a catastrophic event, the emergency response by the crew is evidence of the safety of ferry travel. Hahn also stated a top-speed collision with Gil Island would "rip apart the hull of any ship, even a massive cruise ship". The Premier of British Columbia, Gordon Campbell, echoed this and met with survivors in Prince Rupert on the day of the incident. Despite these events, the premier expressed confidence in the ferry system, saying that "The fleet is safe. Not only is the fleet safe, but it is manned by professional crews that are trained in safety." This was the second accident of a BC Ferries vessel within a year. On June 30, 2005, Queen of Oak Bay lost power while docking.

Coastal villages served by Queen of the North expressed concern about replacement transportation, as many of the small communities rely on BC Ferries not only for transport, but for food, mail and supplies. BC Ferries employed Queen of Prince Rupert as the temporary vessel on the Inside Passage route until the replacement vessel, Northern Adventure began service at the end of March 2007. The ferry corporation declined suggestions that the replacement ship be named in honour of the village of Hartley Bay.

==== Investigations and legal aftermath ====
BC Ferries completed an internal investigation into the sinking and the Transportation Safety Board of Canada conducted a separate investigation.

On March 26, 2006, Queen of the North was located by a manned submersible craft at a depth of 427 metres (1,401 ft). The ship was intact, according to BC Ferries, and was "resting in silt on the keel and the silt covers the hull up to what's called the rubbing strake and above in some areas." At the time of its discovery, the sunken vessel was located at 53° 19.91' N, 129° 14.72' W. Images of the scene were given to the Transportation Safety Board of Canada as part of the investigation into the cause of the sinking.

On March 26, 2007, BC Ferries released the results of its investigation. They blamed the sinking on human error caused by three crew members, specifically Queen of the North's helmswoman (Briker), who was at the wheel of the ship, as well as the ship's second and fourth officers, who had been in charge of navigation. A Vancouver Sun editorial on the sinking noted that two ferry crew members on the watch—the ferry's second and fourth officer—were uncooperative during the course of the BC Ferries internal inquiry. BC Ferries president David Hahn doubted that any new information would be forthcoming from a future disciplinary inquiry, due to the uncooperative responses by these two officers on night watch at the time of the sinking. The Vancouver Sun stated that the BC Ferries report "dismisses the idea that confusion over how to use new bridge equipment installed a month before the crash had anything to do with the sinking." The BC Ferries report also highlights the role of the fourth officer, who had control of the ship from Sainty Point, but failed to make the necessary course correction. According to the report, the Vancouver Sun wrote that:

Just before the crash, the fourth officer screamed at the helmswoman to make a bold course correction – a 109-degree turn – and to switch off the autopilot. But she [the helmswoman] "stated not knowing where the switch was located." [The] BC Ferries' report questions the validity of this evidence "as the autopilot disengages simply with a single switch and would have been operated numerous times by the [helmswoman]." However, in its own report, BC Ferries states the master found it necessary to post a note for navigational crew on how to operate the autopilot and included procedures for changing modes. Evidence was given that the woman at the wheel didn't know the location of the ship when she took over as lookout – or that the ferry was about to crash – until she saw trees. She said she was asked to make only one, maybe two small course changes as directed by the fourth officer after she started her shift but that was ... until just before the vessel hit Gil Island.

The Vancouver Sun does cite an earlier safety board advisory which said that the bridge crew "were confused about how to use a new steering mode selector switch – that, among other things, controls whether the ship is on autopilot or manual steering – installed in a retrofit in February [2006]." However, BC Ferries concluded that the bridge crew working the night of the disaster "chose" to use newly installed steering controls in a way "different" from the manner instructed, but that this choice did not appear to have been the cause for the grounding of Queen of the North. David Hahn states that:

The ship never altered course at all. It never changed its speed, it just ran straight into Gil Island ... There's nothing to indicate they [the three crew members] ever tried anything, It's just human error.

While the three key crew members were reportedly cooperating with a separate Transportation Safety Board (TSB) inquiry into the tragedy, Michael Smyth, a newspaper columnist at The Province, noted that the TSB does not have the authority to assign blame to any party involved in the sinking, unlike the BC Ferries internal inquiry. Consequently, no one would be held accountable for the sinking of Queen of the North.

On March 27, 2006, Alexander and Maria Kotai filed a lawsuit against BC Ferries for negligence, claiming that the company failed to train the crew adequately, supervise the bridge crew, keep proper lookout, operate at a safe speed, and conduct the evacuation to prevent or minimize injuries. The Kotais were moving house at the time from Kitimat to Nanaimo, and lost many of their personal possessions in the sinking. The amount of damages that they sought has not been specified.

On April 24, 2007, BC Ferries fired three Queen of the North crew members who were on the bridge when the ship collided with Gil Island and sank. BC Ferries claims that these three employees were not cooperating fully with all investigators. The B.C. Ferry and Marine Workers' Union represented the ferry crew members. The union indicated that it would appeal the terminations.

The Royal Canadian Mounted Police (RCMP) continued a criminal investigation into the sinking. The TSB's final report was released to the public on March 12, 2008. Its main conclusion was that sound navigational practices and regulations were not followed by the 4 navigational crew at the time.

On the morning of March 16, 2010, in B.C. Provincial Court in Vancouver, a charge of criminal negligence causing death was laid against Karl Lilgert. He was the navigating officer responsible for steering the vessel at the time of the sinking. The charge was reported in a statement issued by the province's Criminal Justice Branch.

On May 13, 2013, Lilgert was convicted of two counts of criminal negligence causing death in B.C. Supreme Court by a jury after five days of deliberations. In 2015 the Supreme Court of Canada declined to hear an appeal; it was expected he would have to serve his four-year sentence.

==== Environmental concerns ====
The ship had approximately 220,000 litres (48,000 imp gal; 58,000 US gal) of diesel fuel on board and 23,000 litres (5,100 imp gal; 6,100 US gal) of lubricating oil. She was also carrying 16 vehicles, and her foundering created an oil slick that quickly spread throughout the sound. Containment efforts began that morning, and on March 25, 2006, officials said that it "appears no major damage has been done to the environment in the area." The long-term effects on Wright Sound's biosystem, and especially its shellfish population, are not yet known. Officials doubted any salvaging of the vessel would be possible. Burrard Clean Operations was hired to conduct environmental response operations as required.

In the legislature in March 2007, NDP Opposition Critic for the Environment Shane Simpson questioned the lack of action in the previous year on removing the fuel from the sunken ship. Minister of Environment Barry Penner advised against "armchair engineering", responding that waterways and sunken vessels were federal responsibilities and that BC Ferries would be working with the Canada Coast Guard to put together a plan that would not result in the unintended release of fuel into the environment.

== Routes ==
=== With Stena Line ===
As Stena Danica the ship sailed on the Gothenburg, Sweden – Frederikshavn, Denmark route.

=== With BC Ferries ===
Route numbers are used internally by BC Ferries. Queen of the North sailed the following routes:

- 1974–1976
  - Route 2 – Georgia Strait Central (Highway 1): Nanaimo (via Departure Bay) to Horseshoe Bay
- 1985–2006
  - Route 10 – Inside Passage: Port Hardy to Prince Rupert
  - Route 11 – Hecate Strait: (Highway 16): Prince Rupert to Haida Gwaii (via Skidegate)
  - Route 40 – Discovery Coast: Port Hardy to Bella Coola (with stops at Bella Bella, Shearwater, Ocean Falls and Klemtu)

=== Maps ===
Numbers in blue circles are ferry route numbers, in accordance to the route numbers listed above. Provincial highway trailblazers are added where appropriate.

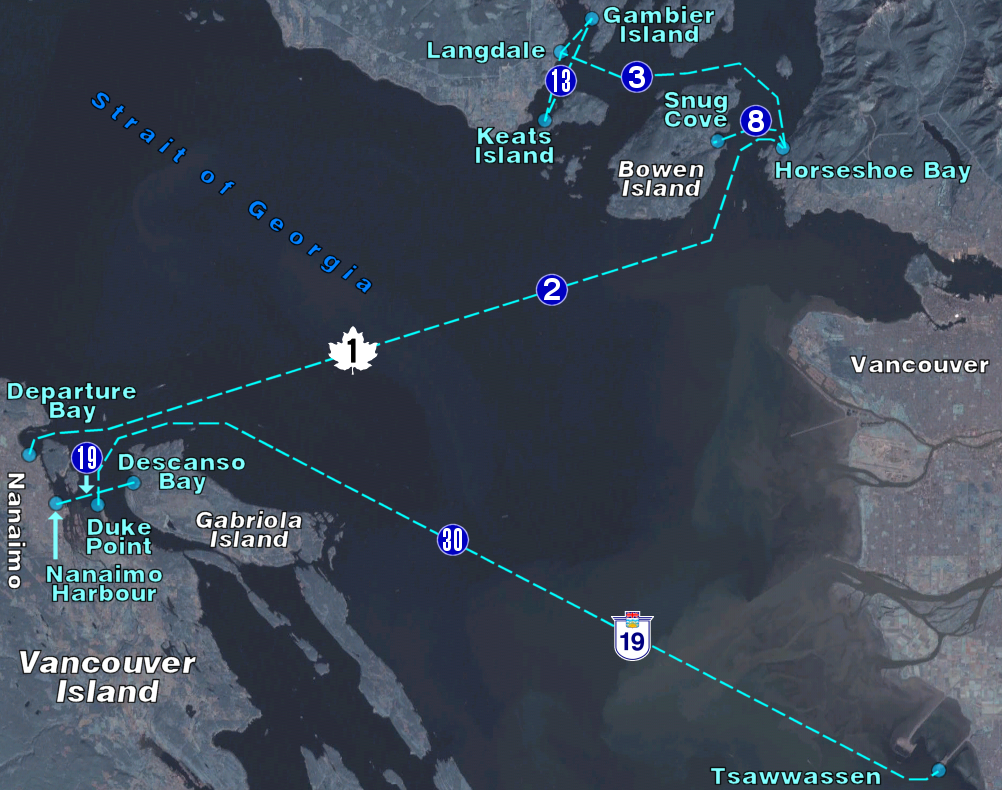
Zone 2 – Central Georgia Strait

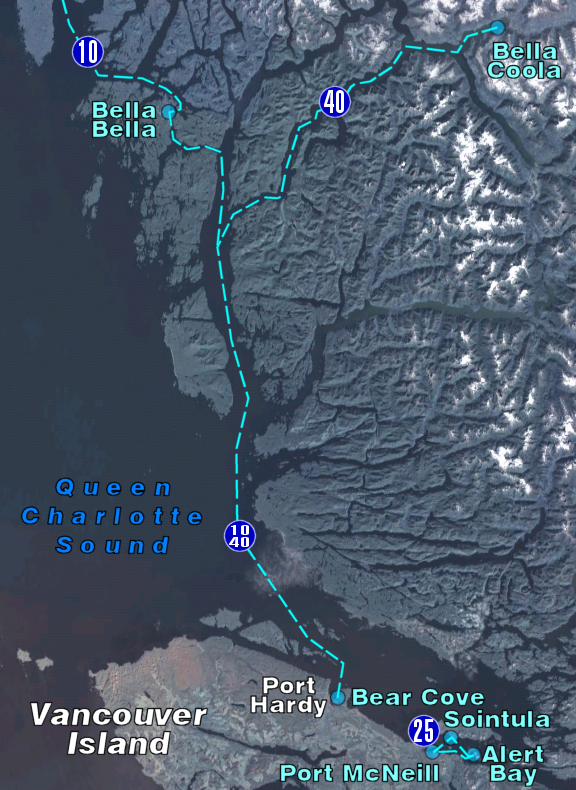
Zone 4 – Queen Charlotte Sound

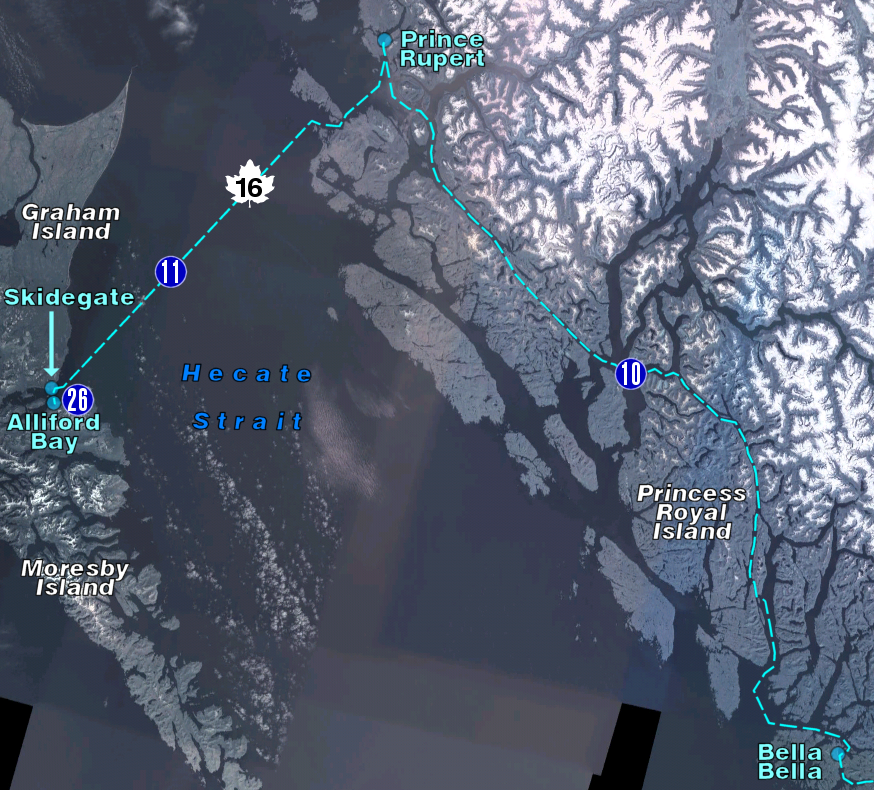
Zone 5 – North Coast

== See also ==
- List of BC Ferries accidents and incidents

Preceded by Queen of Prince Rupert	BC Ferries northern flagship 1980–2006	Succeeded by Northern Adventure; MV Northern Expedition
