= Northern Expeditions =

Northern Expedition or Northern Expeditions can refer to:

== In history ==
=== In Chinese history (北伐) ===
- Zhuge Liang's Northern Expeditions (228–234), a military campaign led by Zhuge Liang in the Three Kingdoms period
- Jiang Wei's Northern Expeditions (247–262), a military campaign led by Jiang Wei in the Three Kingdoms period
- Huan Wen's Northern Expeditions (354–369), a military campaign led by Huan Wen in the Jin dynasty and Sixteen Kingdoms period
- Liu Yu's Northern Expeditions (409–416), a military campaign led by Liu Yu in the Jin dynasty and Sixteen Kingdoms period
- Northern Expedition (Taiping Rebellion), a military campaign led by the Taiping against the Qing during the Taiping Rebellion
- Northern Expedition, a military campaign led by the Kuomintang

=== In Russian history ===
- Great Northern Expedition, the Russian Empire's exploration of its arctic territories

=== In Thai history ===
- Burmese–Siamese War (1849–1855), a military campaign led by the Siamese against the Konbaung dynasty
- Burma campaign, a military campaign led by the Thailand against the British empire

== In transportation ==
- MV Northern Expedition, a ferry operating in northern British Columbia
