= M. Wylie Blanchet =

Canadian travel writer (1891 – 1961)

Muriel Wylie "Capi" Blanchet
- Born: 2 May 1891; Montreal, Quebec
- Died: 9 September 1961 (aged 70); North Saanich, British Columbia
- Occupation: Travel writer

Muriel Wylie "Capi" Blanchet, née Muriel Wylie Liffiton (2 May 1891 – 28 September 1961) was a Canadian travel writer. She is best known for her 1961 book The Curve of Time, which recounts summer travels with her children in the coastal waterways of British Columbia in the 1920s and 1930s.

== Biography ==
=== Early life and family ===
"Capi" Blanchet was born in Montreal, Quebec on May 2, 1891, and was raised in Lachine, Quebec on the Island of Montreal. She was one of five children born to Carrie Jane (née Snetsinger) Liffiton and Charles Alan Liffiton; two sisters (one older and one younger) survived, while a sister and a brother died before the age of two. Her family was well off, with both her father and her mother's family involved in various business, including import and export. Her maternal grandfather John Goodall Snetsinger, a significant presence in the household, was both a prosperous businessman and member of Parliament, among other political positions.

They were an athletic family engaged in multiple outdoor sports, both summer and winter. Blanchet thought of herself as a tomboy, and "almost certain[ly]... spent summers sailing with her father on the St. Lawrence River." She also explored the woods and riverbanks, often catching small animals and fish such as flounders.

The family was devoutly Anglican, and Blanchet herself was well versed in religious and philosophical thought. But she was more drawn to other topics, especially the natural world.

She was an excellent student in secondary school at St. Paul's Academy in Westmount, Montreal, where she captured the top award in each of nine subjects and then was given a special prize for being the top student in "all subjects." But instead of attending university as expected, she married Geoffrey Orme Blanchet on May 30 of either 1910, 1911, or 1912 (records conflict). She later said that she had an interest in studying archaeology if she had continued her education, but reflected that "perhaps," through her later coastal explorations, "in a way that is what I did."

Following her husband's death in a suspected drowning in 1926, Blanchet embarked on annual summer cruises along the British Columbia coast with her five children in the family's 25 foot boat, the Caprice.

By the time of the events depicted in The Curve of Time, Blanchet had five children:

- Elizabeth (called "Betty" in the family),
- Frances,
- Peter (called "Tate" in the family),
- Joan (in the book, "Jan"), and
- David (in the book, "John", his first name).

=== Literary career ===
Her 1961 book, The Curve of Time, is an account of her travels with her children. The title has undergone several editions in Canada and Scotland and has been described as a title which "hovers perpetually on or near the list of 10 best-selling non-fiction books in B.C."

=== Personal life ===
Blanchet's biographer Cathy Converse wrote that Blanchet "wrote modestly little of herself," but rather "exists as a shadowy protagonist against the backdrop of her stories; she is there and yet she is not."

Her regular reading included challenging, intellectual fare like that found in Blackwood's Magazine (also her first publisher) and The Atlantic, which she would sometimes share with people she met in her travels.

=== Death and afterward ===
She died in 1961 at her home in North Saanich on Vancouver Island while working on a second book. The Curve of Time, preface to Seal Press edition published 1993, p. ix. Because she died just six months after publishing The Curve of Time, she did not live to see its success.

Her second book, A Whale Named Henry, was posthumously published in 1983 and tells the story of a small whale trapped behind the rapid currents of Skookumchuck Narrows.^{;}

== Published works ==
- The Curve of Time (1961).
- A Whale Named Henry (1983).^{;}

Blanchet reportedly had an article in The Atlantic, but her biographer could not locate any such publication.
