= The Curve of Time =

1961 book by M. Wylie Blanchet

- Author: M. Wylie Blanchet
- Language: English
- Publisher: William Blackwood & Sons Ltd
- Publication date: 1961
- Publication place: Canada
- Media type: Print
- Pages: 202
- ISBN: 9781895099263 2nd Edition
- LC Class: F1087 .B65

The Curve of Time is a 1961 book by M. Wylie Blanchet recounting trips she took with her five children throughout the inland waterways between Vancouver Island and mainland British Columbia in the 1920s and 1930s. Through at least eleven editions, it has become regarded as a classic of regional literature and travel writing, although Blanchet's adventures and discussions regarding First Nations are out of step with present-day legal protections and cultural sensitivities.

== Summary ==
Blanchet herself wrote that the book "is neither a story nor a log; it is just an account of many long sunny summer months, during many years when the children were young and old enough to take on camping holidays up the coast of British Columbia.

The family's travels were guided in part by a copy they carried of Captain George Vancouver's diaries.

== Publication history ==
The title refers to the theories of J. W. Dunne about the nature of time, as described by playwright Maurice Maeterlinck. The book originated as a series of four articles in the prestigious (though, by the 1960s, waning) Blackwood's Magazine.

William Blackwood & Sons, of Edinburgh, first published the book in 1961. However, Blackwood made very little attempt to promote the book—not even sending any copies to British Columbia.

As of 2008, it had seen eleven printings, including in Canada by Gray's Publishing (1968) and more recently, Whitecap Books.

== Reception and legacy ==
The Curve of Time remained among British Columbia's best-selling non-fiction books more than 50 years after its publication. However, Blanchet died just six months after its initial publication, before it became a success.

It is among the leading books on cruising the reach of the Inside Passage along Vancouver Island, and is on the Vancouver Maritime Museum's list of the top 35 maritime books about British Columbia. Though Blanchet was "careful, and mostly correct" in describing and naming the places in the book, not all the details are clear, leaving subsequent cruisers of the same waters to puzzle over the precise locations.

In 2019, a book reviewer in The Tyee called The Curve of Time "a classic of B.C. literature".

Recommending it as summer nature reading in The Globe and Mail, John Barber wrote, "No category or genre can begin to describe the charm of this book".

In a recommendation in The New Yorker in 2019, Murat Oztaskin praised The Curve of Time as "a superlative text of travel writing and of the Pacific Northwest." For Oztaskin, "[t]he predominant impression is of a very literate woman writing as if only for herself, in service of her memories," and organized "if at all, by incident or theme: trouble with the boat's engine, say, or navigating a specific inlet."

The Curve of Time and Blanchet are the subject of Following the Curve of Time: the Untold Story of Capi Blanchet by Cathy Converse. University courses studying The Curve of Time have included a University of Victoria graduate seminar on literatures of the West Coast.

=== Intrusions upon First Nations settlements and objects ===
The Curve of Time describes intrusions into several First Nations villages on the B.C. coast, where the Blanchet family wander into empty villages and burial areas, bypass locks and warning signs, remove objects and artifacts that they found there, and “played with their old boxes-for-the-dead". Converse notes: “there are now legal protections against the removal of indigenous property, but in Capi’s time no such regulations existed and cultural sensitivities were discounted.”
