= Marine Exchange of Alaska =

- Abbreviation: MXAK
- Formation: 2001
- Headquarters: Juneau, Alaska
- Location(s): 1050 Harbor Way, Juneau, AK 99801
- Website: www.mxak.org

The Marine Exchange of Alaska (MXAK) is a nonprofit maritime organization based in Juneau, Alaska. MXAK was founded in 2001 by retired United States Coast Guard Captain Edward Page, who along with Paul Fuhs and others in the maritime community established a Governing Board. The organization was established to broker information, that aids safe, secure, efficient, and environmentally sound maritime operations in Alaska. MXAK's greatest advance in promoting maritime safety has been the establishment, operation and maintenance of an extensive vessel tracking network comprising over 140 Automatic Identification System (AIS) and Marine Safety stations in Alaska, complemented with satellite tracking systems. MXAK also serves the maritime community by assisting vessels, facilities and ports to comply with state and federal environmental, safety, and security regulations, and installing and maintaining weather stations at remote locations across Alaska. The Marine Exchange of Alaska is a presence in local, state, and federal meetings and workshops, advocating for cost effective measures that benefit Alaska and the maritime community.

== Mission ==
The Marine Exchange of Alaska mission statement is “to serve the Alaska maritime community by providing information, communications and services to aid safe, secure, efficient and environmentally responsible operations.”

== History ==
The Marine Exchange of Alaska was founded by Retired U.S. Coast Guard Captain Ed Page, Paul Fuhs and members of the Alaska maritime community in 2001. Joining 14 other coastal state marine exchanges, MXAK began using advanced technology to build a maritime “safety net” in Alaska and in the Lower 48. Original Alaskan marine industry organizations who played a role in the establishment of the organization include: Alaska Marine Highway, BP Oil Shipping, Crowley Maritime Corporation, Totem Ocean Trailer, Horizon Lines, Polar Tankers, Southwest Alaska Pilots Association, Southeast Alaska Pilots Association, the Alaska Marine Pilots and Pacific Seafood Processors Association. While The Marine Exchange of Alaska began in the 21st century, Maritime Exchanges date back to the mid-1800s when merchants in ports such as San Francisco, California developed a means of gathering and spreading the news of a ship's arrival to assist merchants conduct trade. The February 1, 1849, edition of the Alta California reported the plan of Lt. John Duer, of the United States Navy's Pacific Squadron, to build a semaphore station. A public meeting was held to organize a "Merchants Exchange" to provide a clearing house for information about shipping and other commercial news. Over the years Merchants and Maritime Exchanges were established in other cities throughout the United States of America. The Marine Exchange of Alaska is one of the most recent Maritime Exchanges to be established in the country.

In 2002, the Marine Exchange Executive Director Ed Page and Chief Technology Officer Bill Benning, a retired Coast Guard communications officer, conducted field tests of various satellite tracking technologies on a fishing vessel in the remote waters surrounding the Aleutian Islands. This led to the development of an open architecture satellite based vessel tracking system that was used to locate and track tankers, container ships, tugs and barges, passenger vessels and fishing vessels. All information obtained by the system was provided to the owner/operator and the U.S. Coast Guard.

In 2004, the Marine Exchange of Alaska partnered with McCurnin Nautical, Ocean Grafix, and the National Oceanic and Atmospheric Administration (NOAA) to print up-to-date nautical charts for Alaska's mariners. The organization also commenced providing assistance to the maritime community in complying with the numerous State and federal safety, security and environmental regulations. In 2005, MXAK began installing AIS receiver sites along the coastline of Alaska In 2008, MXAK established a 24-hour, 7-day-a-week watch, monitoring over their vessel tracking system in the Juneau, Alaska office. In 2013, MXAK presented two portable AIS transponders each to the Alaska Native villages of Gambell and Savoonga on the remote Saint Lawrence Island. The transponders were intended for use by the local whalers and citizens operating skiffs and skin boats in order to aid in rescue missions and to ensure they are detected by large commercial vessels plying Arctic waters. MXAK secured funding from the U.S. Arctic Research Commission, the International Union for Conservation of Nature, The Pew Charitable Trusts, and the Oak Foundation to cover expenses for the project.

=== Awards and distinctions ===
In 2006, the Pacific States/British Columbia Oil Spill Task Force selected the Marine Exchange of Alaska as the recipient of its annual Legacy Award for Oil Spill Prevention, Preparedness, and Response. The award was “in recognition of the organization’s development of the Automated Secure Vessel Tracking System (ASVTS) that has served as an exemplary oil spill prevention, preparedness, and response tool for Alaska with applications throughout the Pacific and nationwide.” In 2010 the Marine Exchange of Alaska received the Meritorious Public Service Award, “one of the highest civilian awards offered by the U.S. Coast Guard,” recognizing the organization for its Alaskan AIS network. The award was presented to the Marine Exchange of Alaska by Rear Adm. Christopher Colvin, 17th District commander on February 4, 2010. Letters of congratulations from the Governor of Alaska, Sean Parnell and United States Senator Mark Begich were received following the ceremony.

In 2012, the Marine Exchange of Alaska was the recipient of the Valdez Marine Safety Committee's annual Marine Safety Recognition Award. The organization was described as “instituting a number of outstanding programs relating to the improvement of marine safety” in the Prince William Sound maritime community of Alaska.

== Vessel tracking operations ==
The Marine Exchange of Alaska uses three systems to track vessels operating in Alaska and adjacent waters in Russia and Canada. These systems are: the terrestrial based network of Automated Identification System (AIS), a satellite AIS system provided by exactEarth and use of various satellite transponders. In 2012 MXAK began adding weather sensors to many of their AIS stations and other locations throughout the state of Alaska, calling these sites, “marine safety sites.”

The primary users of MXAK's vessel tracking system are the United States Coast Guard, the following State of Alaska agencies: Department of Transportation, Department of Military and Veterans Affairs, Department of Fish and Game, Department of Public Safety, Department of Commerce, Department of Environmental Conservation, and “operators of cruise ships, tugs, barges, tankers, container ships, passenger vessels, offshore supply vessels, oil exploration and production vessels, landing craft, fishing vessels and oil spill response organizations.”

=== AIS network ===
In 2010, the Marine Exchange of Alaska's Automated Identification System (AIS) network was described as “one of the world's most advanced marine tracking systems” and cited by the U.S. Coast Guard as “robust and critical.”

The backbone of the MXAK vessel tracking network comprises over 140 Marine Safety receiver sites installed along the 33,000 mile long coastline of Alaska. The more remote sites are powered by a solar panels or wind turbines to sustain them. The sites are installed and maintained by MXAK field personnel. MXAK frequently relies on the marine safety aspect of their business for publicity and funding.

=== Satellite AIS tracking ===
In 2013, the Marine Exchange of Alaska partnered with exactEarth, a satellite vessel tracking organization based in Canada, in order to expand their ship monitoring range complementing MXAK's terrestrial based AIS network. Satellite coverage for MXAK extends from the 45th parallel north to the North Pole. The Marine Exchange of Alaska offers this to customers for an increased fee

=== Weather stations ===
In 2012, the Marine Exchange of Alaska began installing weather sensors on many their existing AIS Marine Safety sites in an effort to provide more information to mariners to aid safe voyages. MXAK cited their system will complement the National Weather Service network and over time will transmit real time weather information in a digital format over AIS. MXAK received funds for the project from Alaska Ocean Observing System, an “umbrella regional association for three Alaska regional observing networks (Gulf of Alaska, Bering Sea/Aleutian Islands and Arctic) being developed as part of the national Integrated Ocean Observation System (IOOS) under the National Ocean Planning Partnership.”
