= Inside Passage =

Shipping route along the northwest coast of North America

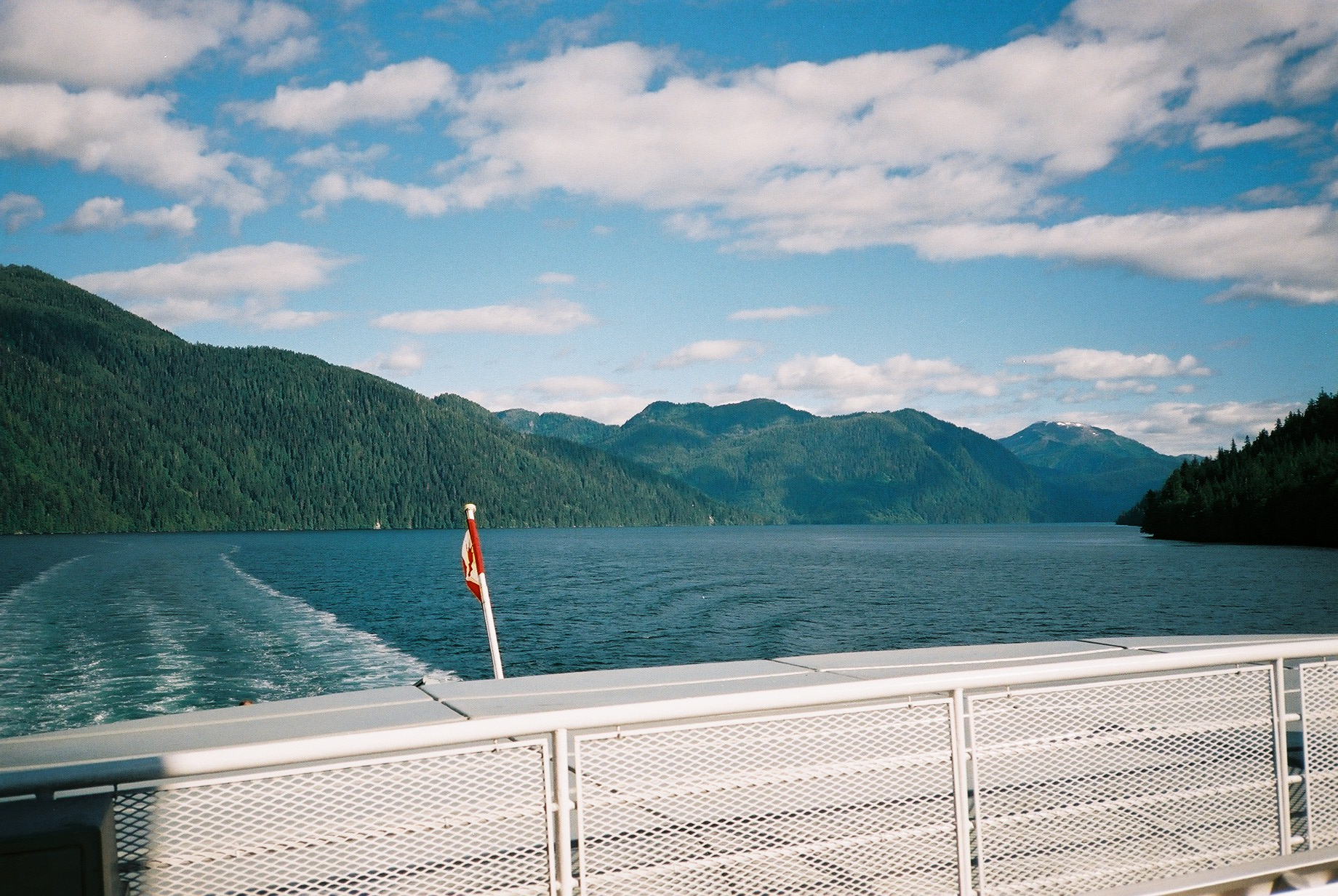
- The Inside Passage in British Columbia
- Interactive map of Inside Passage
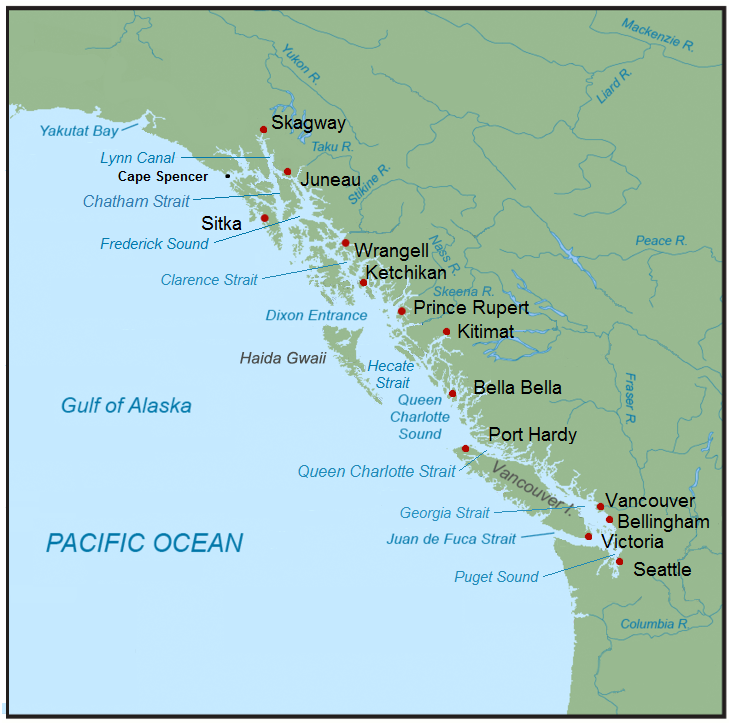
- Map of the Inside Passage
- Location: Pacific Northwest
- Type: sea road
- Basin countries: United States, Canada
- Max. length: 1,000 mi (1,600 km)
- Frozen: No
- Sections/sub-basins: Alaska, Washington, British Columbia

The Inside Passage (French: Passage Intérieur) is a coastal route for ships and boats along a network of passages which weave through the islands on the Pacific Northwest coast of the North American Fjordland. The route extends from southeastern Alaska in the United States, through western British Columbia in Canada, to northwestern Washington state in the United States. Ships using the route can avoid some of the bad weather in the open ocean and may visit some of the many isolated communities along the route. The Inside Passage is heavily travelled by cruise ships, freighters, tugs with tows, fishing craft, pleasure craft, and ships of the Alaska Marine Highway, BC Ferries, and Washington State Ferries systems. Coast Guard vessels of both Canada and the United States patrol and transit in the Passage.

In academic publishing, Inside Passage refers to the broader network of waterways, fjords, and islands, rather than just as a navigational route.

== Route ==
It is generally accepted that the southernmost point of the Inside Passage is Olympia, Washington, which is also the southernmost point of Puget Sound. Moving north, the passage continues into the waters of the greater Salish Sea. It then passes through the Strait of Georgia and Johnstone Strait, between northeastern Vancouver Island and the coast of mainland British Columbia. From there it continues further northwest into the Alaska Panhandle. The northernmost points of the Passage are Haines and Skagway at the head of the Lynn Canal. As a result of often uncertain weather, large tidal range, fast or unpredictable currents, and infrequent safe anchorages, navigating the Inside Passage can be difficult.

During the Klondike Gold Rush the passage was one of the sea routes from Seattle and California, carrying American prospectors northward.

Today, approximately 36,000 recreational cruising boats utilize portions of the Inside Passage route. The nonprofit Marine Exchange of Alaska plots and follows vessel traffic in the Alaskan section of the Inside Passage. Captain Warren Good has catalogued some 3,641 shipwrecks along the Alaska portion of the Passage. The Underwater Archeological Society of British Columbia conducts periodic Regional Shipwreck Surveys.

=== Washington portion ===
Washington's portion of the route is made up almost entirely of the waterways of Puget Sound. Starting from the southernmost point of Budd Inlet, the waterway turns toward the northeast and broadens as it becomes the Nisqually Reach of Puget Sound. The waterway then continues northeast through the Tacoma Narrows, northward toward the San Juan Islands, just southeast of the border with Canada.

=== British Columbia portion ===
British Columbia's 1,125 km (700 mi) portion of the route includes the wide, protected Strait of Georgia between Vancouver Island and the B.C. mainland, the narrow Johnstone Strait and Discovery Passage between Vancouver Island and the mainland, Blackfish Sound at the northern end of Vancouver Island as well as a long stretch of 400 km (250 mi) between islands and reaches or along the wider and more exposed Hecate Strait near Haida Gwaii (formerly the Queen Charlotte Islands). From Fitz Hugh Sound northwards, the route is sheltered from Pacific winds and waves by the various large islands in the area such as Princess Royal Island and Pitt Island. This section includes a series of channels and straits, from south to north: Fisher Channel, Lama Passage, Seaforth Channel, Milbanke Sound, Finlayson Channel, Sarah Passage, Tolmie Channel, Princess Royal Channel (includes Graham Reach and Fraser Reach), McKay Reach, Wright Sound, Grenville Channel, Arthur Passage, and Chatham Sound.

=== Alaska portion ===
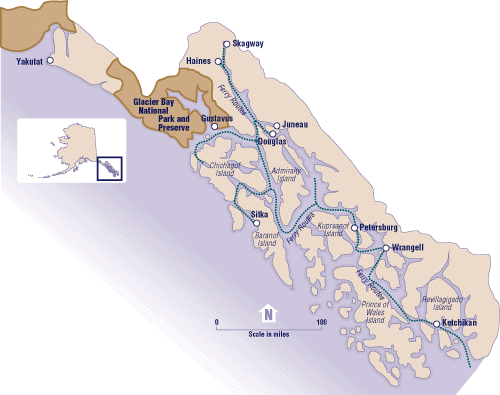
A map of the Alaskan portion of the Inside Passage.

Alaska's portion of the Inside Passage extends 500 miles (800 km) from north to south and 100 miles (160 km) from east to west. The area encompasses 1,000 islands and thousands of coves and bays. While the Alexander Archipelago in Alaska provides some protection from the Pacific Ocean weather, much of the area experiences strong semi-diurnal tides. Lynn Canal is the northernmost waterway of the Inside Passage.

== Tourism ==
The Inside Passage is a popular tourism destination. The coastal mountain ranges and islands offer wildlife viewing and opportunities for boating, fishing, kayaking, camping and hiking. Wildlife viewing in the region ranges from birding to whale watching and bear viewing. Designated bear viewing is available at Anan Creek near Wrangell and at Pack Creek Bear Sanctuary on Admiralty Island near Juneau.

The most popular way to explore the Inside Passage during summer is by cruise ship. Over 2 million people take cruises each year in this region, impacting the local economy significantly. Because there are few restrictions on ship size, all of the large main line cruise ships offer Inside Passage itineraries. Some of the major players include Norwegian, Disney, Princess, Celebrity, Cunard, etc. Most of these cruises offer round-trips from either Vancouver or Seattle. Cruise ship travel in 2020 was cancelled due to the Coronavirus Pandemic and uncertainty continued through February 2022 when Canada had kept cruise ships banned.

Although a smaller industry, there are also a handful of expedition cruises that explore the Inside Passage. These ships tend to be smaller than main line cruises and focus more on wildlife watching. National Geographic operate several expedition boats here.

== 1994 Transit Fee Crisis ==
During the salmon treaty negotiations in early 1994, Canada concluded that the United States was not responsive to Canada's concerns.

Accordingly, on June 15, 1994, Canada imposed a transit fee on all US commercial fishing boats using the Canadian Inside Passage. The fee was eventually lifted through bilateral negotiations. The crisis remained peaceful, and there were no violent incidents between US fishing boats and Canadian enforcement officials.

In response to the Canadian action, on October 24, 1995, the US Congress passed an amendment to the Fishermen's Protective Act, adding provisions permitting the US government to directly reimburse US fishers for fines and other costs associated with seizures by foreign governments.

== Cultural references ==
British author Jonathan Raban described his journey by boat through the Inside Passage from Seattle to Juneau in his 1999 travelogue Passage to Juneau: A Sea and Its Meanings.

In The Curve of Time (1961), Canadian travel writer M. Wylie Blanchet chronicled her travels by boat in the 1920s and 1930s with her five children throughout the Inside Passage waters between Vancouver Island and the mainland. Blanchet's biographer states that the book has become "one of the leading books on cruising the Inside Passage from the southeast coast of Vancouver Island to Cape Caution".

== See also ==
- Southeast Alaska
- British Columbia Coast
- Alaska Marine Highway
- BC Ferries
- Washington State Ferries
- MV Queen of the North
- SS Princess Sophia
