= Wuikinuxv Nation =

First Nation government in British Columbia, Canada

- Band No. 541
- Statement of Intent boundaries
- People: Wuikinuxv
- Headquarters: Port Hardy
- Province: British Columbia

Land
- Other reserves: Katit 1; Kiltala 2; Cockmi 3
- Land area: 7.128 km^{2} (2.752 sq mi)

Population (2024)
- On reserve: 51
- On other land: 27
- Off reserve: 216
- Total population: 294

Government
- Chief: Marlou Shaw
- Council: Miranda Hanuse May; Zachariah Hanuse

Tribal Council
- Wuikinuxv-Kitasoo-Nuxalk Tribal Council

Website
- wuikinuxv.net

The Wuikinuxv Nation, also known as the Oweekeno Nation, is a First Nations band government whose traditional territory is the shores of Rivers Inlet and Owikeno Lake in the Central Coast region of the Canadian province of British Columbia, in the area south of Bella Bella and north of Queen Charlotte Strait. The Wuikinuxv people a.k.a. the Oweekeno people reside in the area of Rivers Inlet and Owikeno Lake, primarily at a village on the Wannock River. Substantial numbers of Wuikinuxv also reside away from the traditional territory in Port Hardy on Vancouver Island and in larger BC communities such as Campbell River, Vancouver and Victoria. Approximately 80 people reside at the village (Katit Indian Reserve No. 1) while overall membership was 283 in 2006, 194 of whom lived off-reserve.

The First Nation has an elected Chief and Council responsible for modern economic and administrative areas and also continues to respect a more deeply rooted hereditary system. It is a member of the Wuikinuxv-Kitasoo-Nuxalk Tribal Council.

== Language ==
The Wuikinuxv speak the Oowekyala language, a Northern Wakashan language which is a dialect of a language known as Heiltsuk-Oowekyala, the other main dialect of which is Heiltsuk. Their language, which in their own official usage is spelled "Wuikyala," and the people were incorrectly known in the past as "Northern Kwakiutl", as were the Haisla.

== Indian reserves ==
Indian reserves under the administration of the Wuikinuxv Nation are:

- Katit Indian Reserve No. 1, on the banks of the Wannock River at outflow of Owikeno Lake, at Rivers Inlet, 658 ha.51°41′00″N 127°12′00″W
- Kiltala Indian Reserve No. 2, at the mouth of the Kilbella River on Kilbella Bay, a part of Rivers Inlet near its head, 50 ha.51°43′00″N 127°21′00″W
- Cockmi Indian Reserve No. 3, on the west tip of Walbran Island near Darby Channel, 4.80 ha.
