= Indigenous peoples of the Pacific Northwest Coast =

Nations and tribes originating from the Pacific Northwest Coast

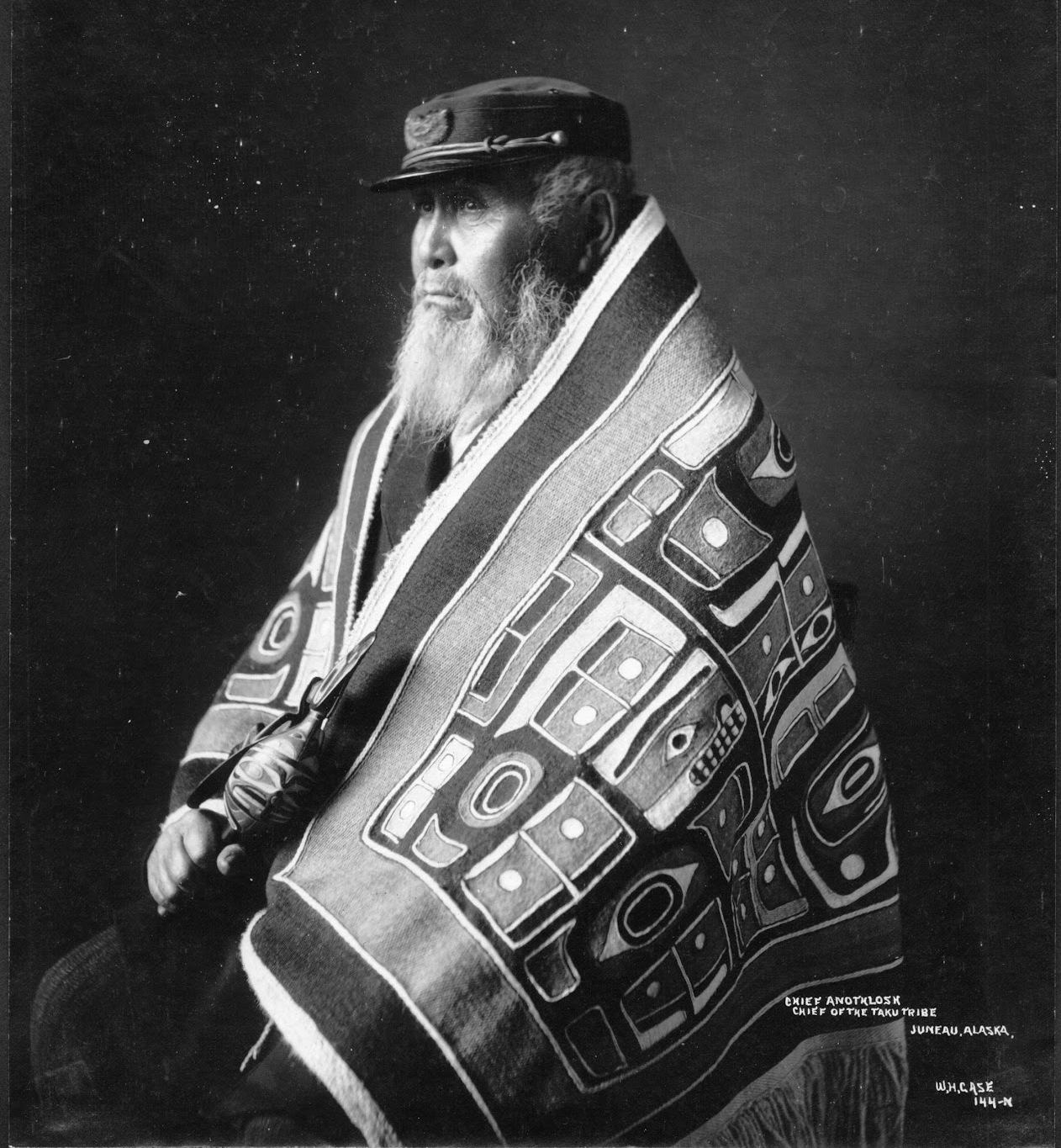
Chief Anotklosh of the Taku Tribe of the Tlingit people, ca. 1913

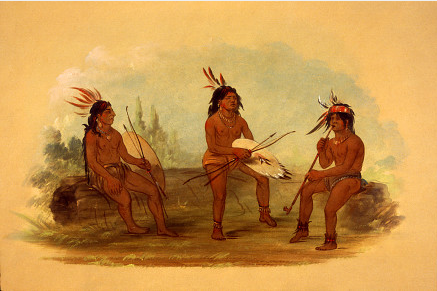
Painting representing "Three Young Chinook Men" by George Catlin

The Indigenous peoples of the Pacific Northwest Coast are the many First Nations and Alaska Native peoples whose traditional homelands lie along the Pacific coast of northwestern North America. The region is defined as a long, narrow coastal zone from the Alaska Panhandle through to British Columbia, Washington State, Oregon, and Northern California. Each ethnic group has distinct histories, political identities, and languages, but they share cultural and subsistence practices, certain beliefs, ceremonies, traditions, and artistic forms. Salmon is a central resource and spiritual symbol. The term Northwest Coast or North West Coast is used in anthropology to refer to the groups, while the term Pacific Northwest is largely used in the American context.

The environment of the Pacific Northwest supported unusually dense settlement for hunter gatherer societies, with ample salmon runs, shellfish, herring, halibut, sea mammals, cedar forests, berries, roots, and game making possible large permanent or semi-permanent villages, extensive trade, and highly complex political and ceremonial life. At one point, the region had the highest population density of a region inhabited by Indigenous peoples in Canada.

== List of nations ==
The Pacific Northwest Coast at one time had the most densely populated areas of Indigenous people ever recorded in Canada. The land and waters provided rich natural resources through cedar and salmon, and highly structured cultures developed from relatively dense populations. Within the Pacific Northwest, many different nations developed, each with their own distinct history, culture, and society. Some cultures in this region were very similar and share certain elements, such as the importance of salmon to their cultures, while others differed. Prior to contact, and for a brief time after colonization, some of these groups regularly conducted war against each other through raids and attacks. Through warfare they gathered captives for slavery.

=== Eyak ===
The Eyak people traditionally inhabit the Copper River Delta region on the northern edge of the Alaska Panhandle. Historically, Eyak communities were located along the coastal areas and river systems of south-central Alaska, where they relied on fishing, hunting, and gathering for subsistence.

Today, most Eyak people live in or near the city of Cordova. Although the Eyak language went extinct in 2008 before being revitalized by a self-taught Frenchman, the community has been involved in efforts to document and revitalize aspects of Eyak language and culture.

=== Tlingit ===
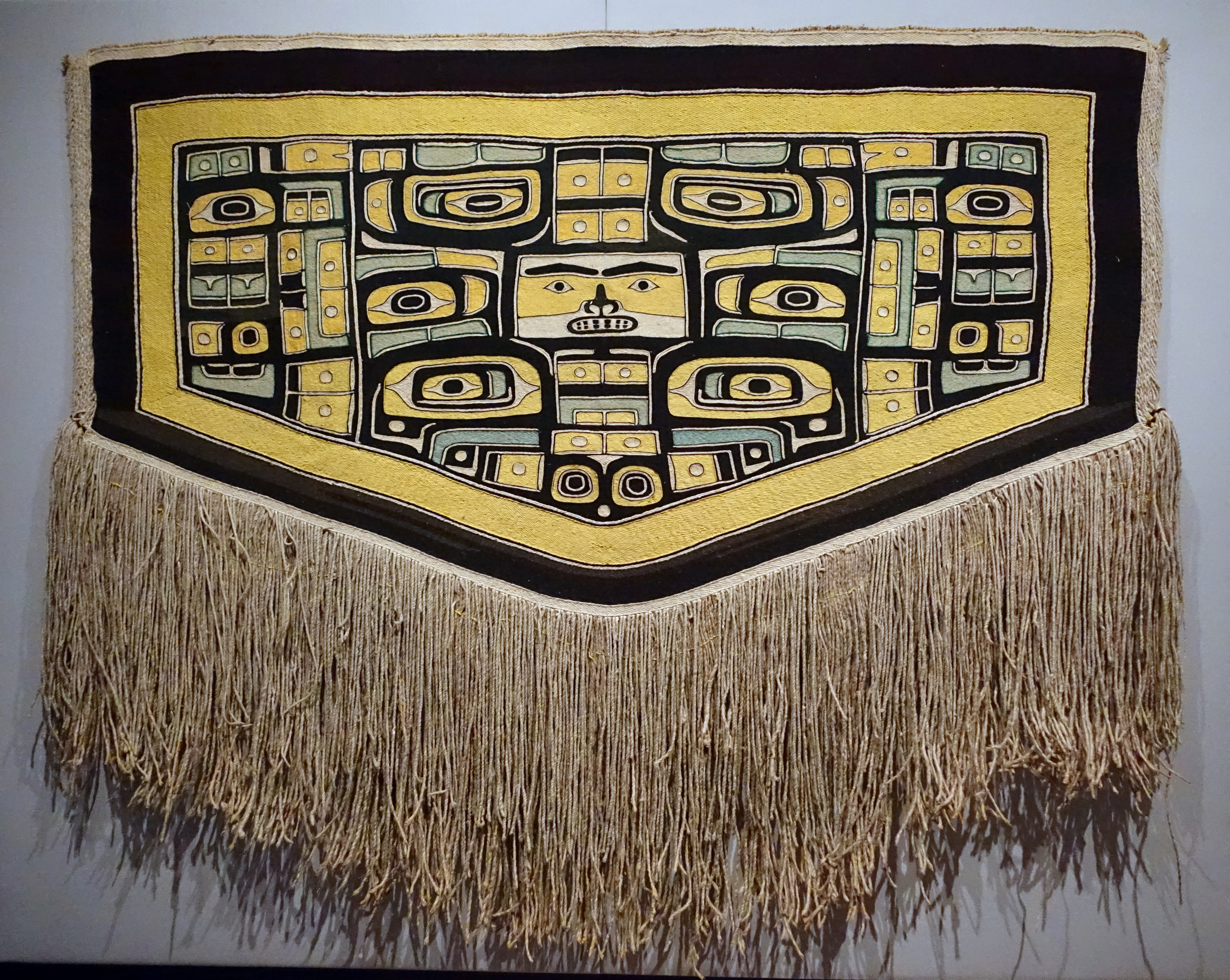
Chilkat blanket, made from woven goat hair

The Tlingit (/ˈklɪŋkɪt/ KLINK-it, /ˈtlɪŋɡɪt/; the latter is considered inaccurate) are one of the furthest north Indigenous nations in the Pacific Northwest Coast. Their autonym is Lingít [ɬɪŋkɪ́t], meaning "Human being". The Russian name for them, Koloshi, was derived from an Aleut term for the labret; and the related German name, Koulischen, may be encountered in older historical literature.

The Tlingit are a matrilineal society. They developed a complex hunter-gatherer culture in the temperate rainforest of the Alaska Panhandle and adjoining inland areas of present-day British Columbia.

=== Haida ===
The Haida people (/ˈhaɪdə/ HY-də) are well known as skilled artisans of wood, metal and design. They have also shown much perseverance and resolve in the area of forest conservation. The vast forests of cedar and spruce where the Haida make their home are on pre-glacial land, which is believed, according to a theory held by Quentin Mackie, an archaeologist from the University of Victoria to be almost 14,000 years old. The Haida were widely known for their art and architecture, both of which focused on the creative embellishment of wood. They decorated utilitarian objects with depictions of supernatural and other beings in a highly conventionalized style.

Haida communities located in Prince of Wales Island, Alaska and Haida Gwaii, British Columbia (previously referred to as the Queen Charlotte Islands) also share a common border with other Indigenous peoples, such as the Tlingit and the Tsimshian. The Haida were also famous for their long-distance raiding and slaving, going often to California for trading.

=== Tsimshian ===
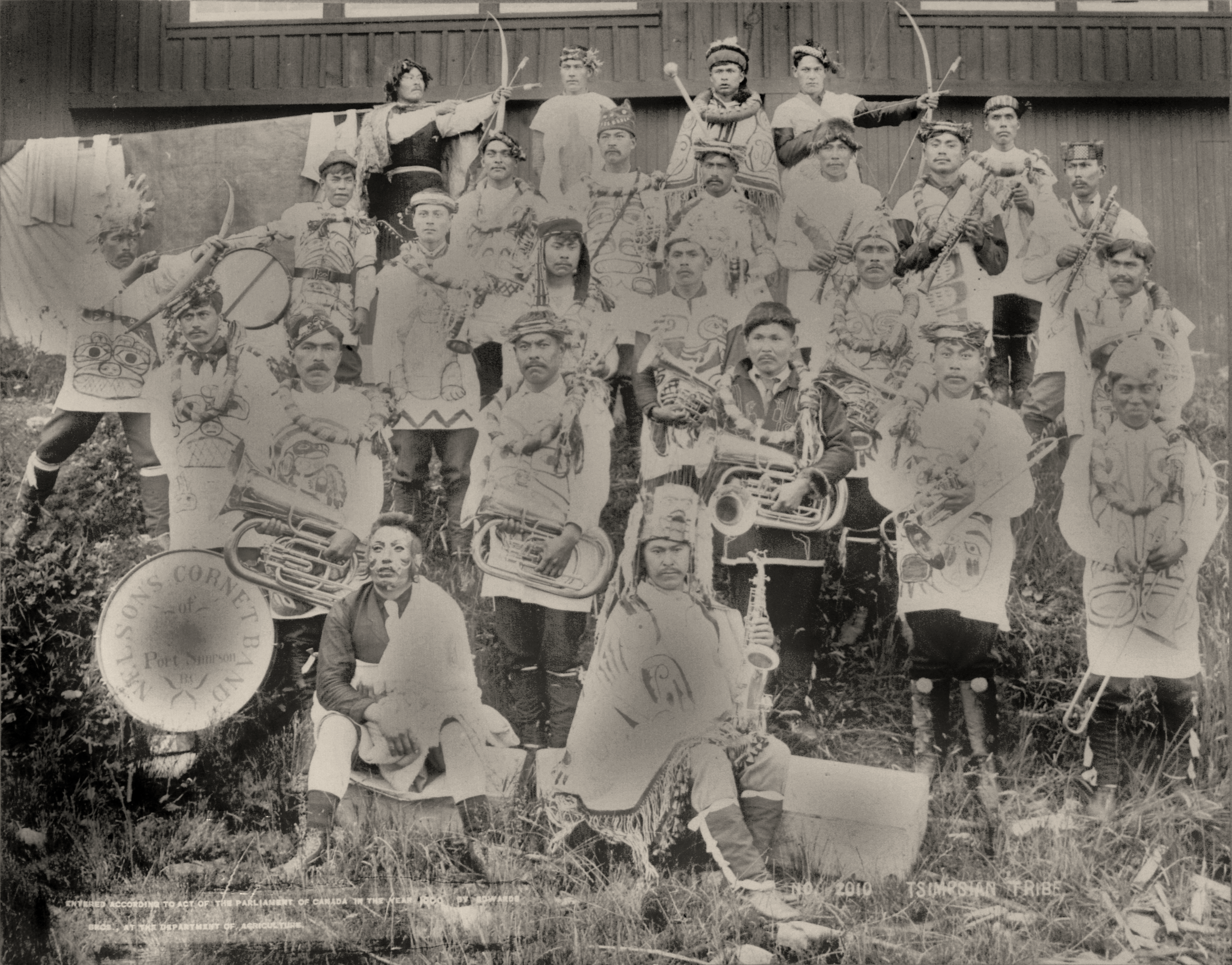
Tsimshian people in 1900

The Tsimshian (/ˈsɪmʃiən/ SIM-shee-ən), translated as "People Inside the Skeena River," are Indigenous people who live around Terrace and Prince Rupert on the North Coast of British Columbia, and the southernmost corner of Alaska on Annette Island. There are about 10,000 Tsimshian, of whom about 1,300 live in Alaska.

Succession in Tsimshian society is matrilineal, and one's place in society was determined by one's clan or phratry (defined as four equal parts). Four main Tsimshian clans form the basic phratry. The Laxsgiik (Eagle Clan) and Ganhada (Raven Clan) form one half. Gispwudwada (Killer Whale Clan) and Laxgibuu (Wolf Clan) form the other half. Prior to European contact, marriage in Tsimshian society could not take place within a half-group, for example between a Wolf and a Killer Whale. It was considered to be incest even if there was no blood relationship. Marriages were only arranged between people from clans in different halves: for example, between a Killer Whale and a Raven or Eagle.

=== Gitxsan ===
The Gitxsan or Gitksan, meaning "people of the Skeena River", were known with the Nisga'a as Interior Tsimshian. They speak a closely related language to Nisga'a, though both are related to Coast Tsimshian (the English term for Tsimshian spoken on the coast). Although inland, their culture is part of the Northwest Coast culture area, and they share many common characteristics, including the clan system, an advanced art style, and war canoes. They share an historic alliance with the neighboring Wetʼsuwetʼen, a subgroup of the Dakelh (or Carrier people). Together they waged a battle in the courts against British Columbia known as Delgamuukw v British Columbia, which had to do with land rights.

=== Haisla ===
The Haisla (also Xaʼislakʼala, X̄aʼislakʼala, X̌àʼislakʼala, X̣aʼislakʼala) are an Indigenous nation living at Kitamaat in the North Coast region of the Canadian province of British Columbia. The name Haisla is derived from the Haisla word x̣àʼisla or x̣àʼisəla, "(those) living at the rivermouth, living downriver".

=== Heiltsuk ===
The Heiltsuk (/ˈhaɪltsʊk/ HYLE-tsuuk) are an Indigenous Nation of the Central Coast region of the Canadian province of British Columbia, centred on the island communities of Bella Bella and Klemtu. The Heiltsuk are the descendants of a number of tribal groups who came together in Bella Bella in the 19th century. They generally prefer the autonym Heiltsuk. Anthropology labelled them the Bella Bella, which is how they are more widely known.

=== Nuxalk ===
The Nuxalk (pronounced [ʔnuχalc]), also known as the Bella Coola, are an Indigenous people of the Central Coast, as well as the furthest north of the Coast Salish cultures. Linguists have classified their Salishan language as independent of both Interior and Coast Salish language groups. It is quite different from that of their coastal neighbours, though it contains a large number of Wakashan loan words. They are believed to have been more connected to Interior Salish peoples, before Athabaskan-speaking groups now inland from them spread southwards, cutting the Nuxalk off from their linguistic relatives.

=== Wuikinuxv ===
The Wuikinuxv, also known as the Owekeeno or Rivers Inlet people (after their location), speak a language related to Heiltsuk, Wuikyala or Oowekyala (they are dialects of a language that has no independent name; linguists refer to it as Heiltsuk-Oweekyala). Together with the Heiltsuk and Haisla, they were once incorrectly known as the Northern Kwakiutl because of their language's close relationship with Kwakʼwala. Greatly reduced in numbers today, like other coastal peoples they were master carvers and painters. They had an elaborate ritual and clan system. The focus of their territory was Owikeno Lake, a freshwater fjord above a short stretch of river at the head of Rivers Inlet, although they inhabited the inlet proper out to Calvert Island/Koeye.

=== Kwakwakaʼwakw ===
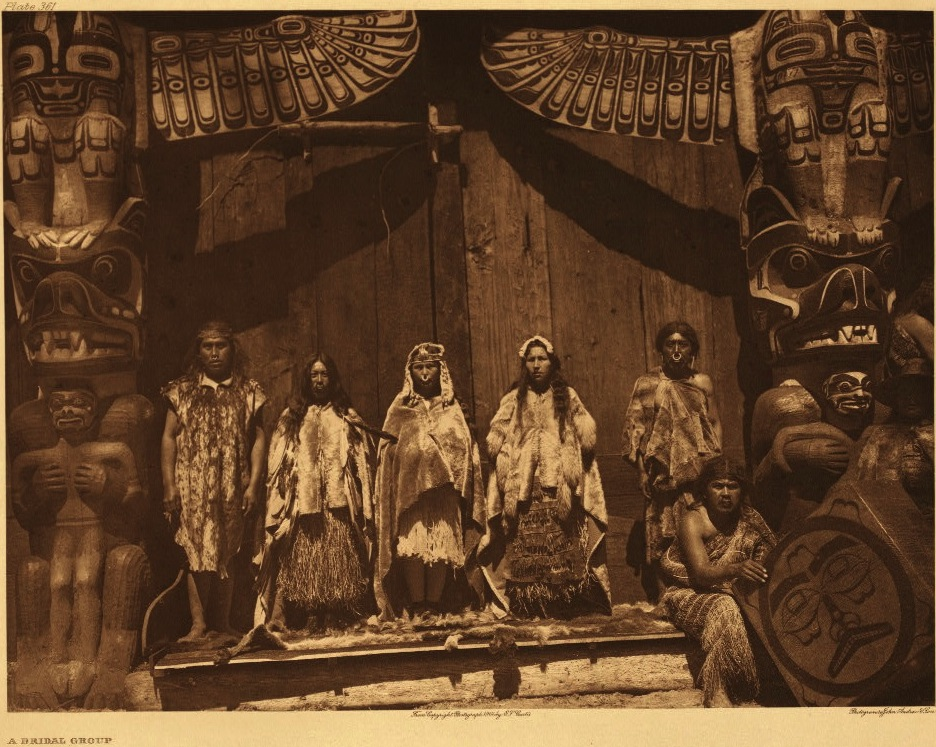
Kwakwakaʼwakw people at a wedding ceremony in 1914

The Kwakwakaʼwakw are an Indigenous people, numbering about 5,500, who live in British Columbia on northern Vancouver Island and the mainland. The autonym they prefer is Kwakwakaʼwakw. Their Indigenous language, part of the Wakashan languages family, is Kwakʼwala. The name Kwakwakaʼwakw means "speakers of Kwakʼwala". The language is now spoken by less than 5% of the population—about 250 people. Today 17 separate tribes make up the Kwakwakaʼwakw, who historically spoke the common language of Kwakʼwala. Some Kwakwakaʼwakw groups are now extinct. Kwakʼwala is a Northern Wakashan language, a grouping shared with Haisla, Heiltsuk and Oowekyala.

=== Daʼnaxdaʼxw Nation ===
The Daʼnaxdaʼxw Nation, or Da'naxda'xw/Awaetlatla Nation is a First Nations government in northern Vancouver Island in British Columbia, Canada, their main community is the community of Alert Bay in the Queen Charlotte Strait region. There are approximately 225 members of the Daʼnaxdaʼxw Nation. The Nation is a member of the Kwakiutl District Council and, for treaty negotiation purposes, the Winalagalis Treaty Group which includes three other members of the Kwakiutl District Council (the Quatsino First Nation, the Gwaʼsala-ʼNakwaxdaʼxw Nations, and the Tlatlasikwala Nation).

=== Nuu-chah-nulth ===
The Nuu-chah-nulth (/nuːˈtʃɑːnʊlθ/ noo-CHAH-nuulth; Nuu-chah-nulth: [nuːt͡ʃaːnˀuɬ]) are an Indigenous people in Canada. Their traditional home is in the Pacific Northwest on the west coast of Vancouver Island. In pre-contact and early post-contact times, the number of nations was much greater, but as in the rest of the region, smallpox and other consequences of contact resulted in the disappearance of some groups, and the absorption of others into neighbouring groups.

They were among the first Pacific peoples north of California to come into contact with Europeans. Competition between Spain and the United Kingdom over control of Nootka Sound led to a bitter international dispute around 1790, which was settled when Spain agreed to abandon its claim of exclusivity to the North Pacific coast, and to pay damages for British ships seized during the dispute. The Nuu-chah-nulth speak a Southern Wakashan language and are closely related to the Makah and Ditidaht.

=== Ditidaht ===
The Ditidaht are a Southern Wakashan speaking people related to the Nuu-chah-nulth. Their territory is concentrated in the southern portion of Vancouver Island.

=== Makah ===
The Makah are a Southern Wakashan people and are closely related to the Nuu-chah-nulth. They are also noted as whalers. Their territory is around the northwest tip of the Olympic Peninsula.

=== Coast Salish ===
A Squamish elder woman spinning wool on spindle-whorl, circa 1893

The Coast Salish are the largest of the southern groups. They are a loose grouping of many tribes with numerous distinct cultures and languages. Territory claimed by Coast Salish peoples spans from the northern end of the Strait of Georgia, along the east side of Vancouver Island, covering most of southern Vancouver Island, all of the Lower Mainland and Sunshine Coast, all of Puget Sound except (formerly) for the Chimakum territory near Port Townsend, and all of the Olympic Peninsula except that of the Quileute, related to the now-extinct Chemakum. The Strait of Georgia and Puget Sound were officially united as the Salish Sea in 2010.

The Coast Salish cultures differ considerably from those of their northern neighbours. One branch, the Bella Coola, feature a patrilineal, not matrilineal, system. As a whole, the Coast Salish tribes generally have both a matrilineal and patrilineal system. They are also one of the few peoples on the coast whose traditional territories coincide with contemporary major metropolitan areas, namely the North Straits Salish-speaking peoples in and around Victoria, the Halkomelem-speaking peoples in and around Vancouver, and the Lushootseed-speaking peoples in and around Seattle. Pre-European contact, the Coast Salish numbered in the tens of thousands, and as such were one of the most populous groups on the northwest coast

=== Chimakum ===
The Chimakum people were a Chimakuan-speaking people whose traditional territory lay in the area of Port Townsend. Beset by warfare from surrounding Salish peoples, their last major presence in the region was eradicated by the Suquamish under Chief Seattle in the mid-19th century. Some survivors were absorbed by neighbouring Salish peoples, while some moved to join the Quileute on the southeast side of the Olympic Peninsula.

=== Quileute ===
The Quileute (/ˈkwɪliuːt/) are a Chimakuan-speaking people. Their traditional territory is in the western Olympic Peninsula, around the Quillayute and Hoh Rivers.

=== Willapa ===
The Willapa people are a traditionally Athabaskan-speaking people of southwestern Washington. Their territory was between Willapa Bay (named after them) and the prairie lands around the head of the Chehalis and Cowlitz Rivers. A related people, known as the Clatskanie (/ˈklætskɪnaɪ/) or Tlatskani, lived on the south side of the Columbia River in northwestern Oregon.

=== Chinook ===
The Chinookan peoples were once one of the most powerful and populous groups of tribes on the southern part of the Northwest Coast. Their territories flank the mouth of the Columbia River and stretch up that river in a narrow band adjacent to that river, as far as Celilo Falls. Their group of dialects are known as Chinookan. It is distinguished from the Chinook Jargon, which was partly based upon it, and is often called "Chinook." Close allies of the Nuu-chah-nulth, they are also a canoe people, and pre-European contact, Chinook Jargon arose as a trading language incorporating both Chinookan and Wakashan vocabulary. Recent attempts to keep Chinook Jargon or Chinook Wawa alive are helped by the corpus of songs and stories dictated by Victoria Howard to Melville Jacobs, published by him as Clackamas Chinook Texts. Selections from that corpus were also published as Clackamas Chinook Performance Art. The Chinookan peoples practiced slavery, likely learned from the Nuu-chah-nulth as it was more common to the north, and cranial deformation. Those without flattened heads were considered to be beneath or servile to those who had undergone the procedure as infants.

One likely reason for the cultural prominence of the Chinookan peoples was their strategic position along the Columbia River, which acted as a massive trade corridor, as well as near Celilo Falls, the longest continuously inhabited site in the Americas, used as a fishing site and trading hub for 15,000 years by a wide range of Indigenous peoples.

=== Tillamook ===
The Tillamook or Nehalem peoples were a Coast Salishan-speaking group of tribes living roughly between Tillamook Head and Cape Meares on the northern Oregon Coast. The term 'Tillamook' itself is in fact an exonym, from the neighbouring Chinook-speaking Kathlamet people. Although the Tillamook language was a Coast Salish language, it was somewhat divergent from its more northerly cousins; likewise, the Tillamook culture was substantially different from that of other Coast Salish cultures, apparently influenced by its southern neighbors. They, and their southern neighbors, were less reliant on salmon runs and more reliant on fish trapping in estuaries, hunting, and shellfish gathering.

=== Klamath ===
The Klamath people are a Native American tribe of the Plateau culture area in Southern Oregon and Northern California. Historically they occupied the area around the Upper Klamath Lake (E-ukshi - “Lake”) and the Klamath, Williamson (Kóke - “River”), Wood River (E-ukalksini Kóke), and Sprague (Plaikni Kóke - “River Uphill”) rivers. Today Klamath people are enrolled in these federally recognized tribes:

- Klamath Tribes (Klamath, Modoc, and Yahooskin (Yahuskin) Band of Northern Paiute Indians), Oregon
- Quartz Valley Indian Community (Klamath, Karuk (Karok), and Shasta (Chasta) people), California.

== History ==
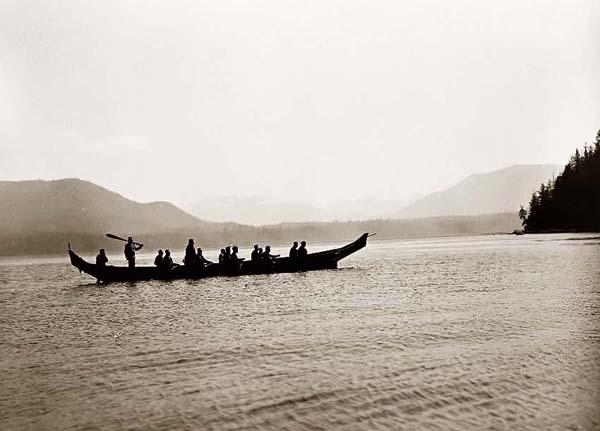
A Kwakwakaʼwakw canoe in 1910.

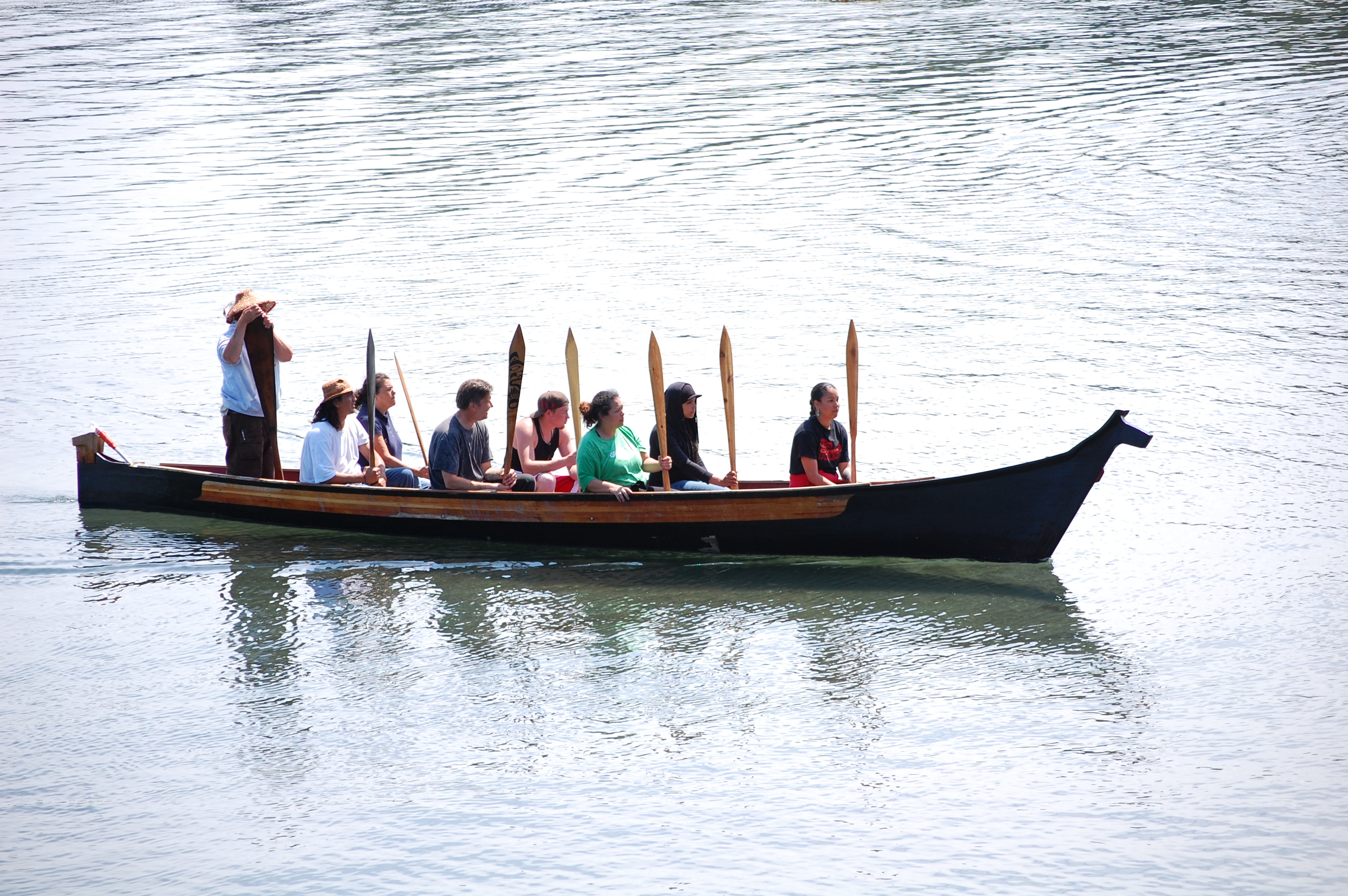
A canoe awaiting traditional invitation to make landfall by the local S'Klallam people at a beach in Port Angeles, Washington, in 2010. Canoes from several Coast Salish groups arrived for a ceremony commemorating the official naming of the Salish Sea.

The area referred to as the Northwest Coast has a very long history of human occupation, exceptional linguistic diversity, population density and cultural and ceremonial development. Noted by anthropologists for its complexity, there is emerging research that the economies of these people were more complex and intensive than was previously assumed. Coast Salish peoples' had complex land management practices linked to ecosystem health and resilience. Forest gardens on Canada's northwest coast included crabapple, hazelnut, cranberry, wild plum, and wild cherry species. Many groups have First Generation Stories - family stories that tell of the origin of the group, and often of humans themselves arising in specific locations along the coast.

"the Indian history of British Columbia... began at least a hundred centuries before the Province itself was born...." Wilson Duff

On the northwest coast of North America, the mild climate and abundant natural resources made possible the rise of a complex Aboriginal culture. The people who lived in what are today British Columbia, Washington, and Oregon were able to obtain a good living without much effort. They had time and energy to devote to the development of fine arts and crafts and to religious and social ceremonies.

=== European colonization ===
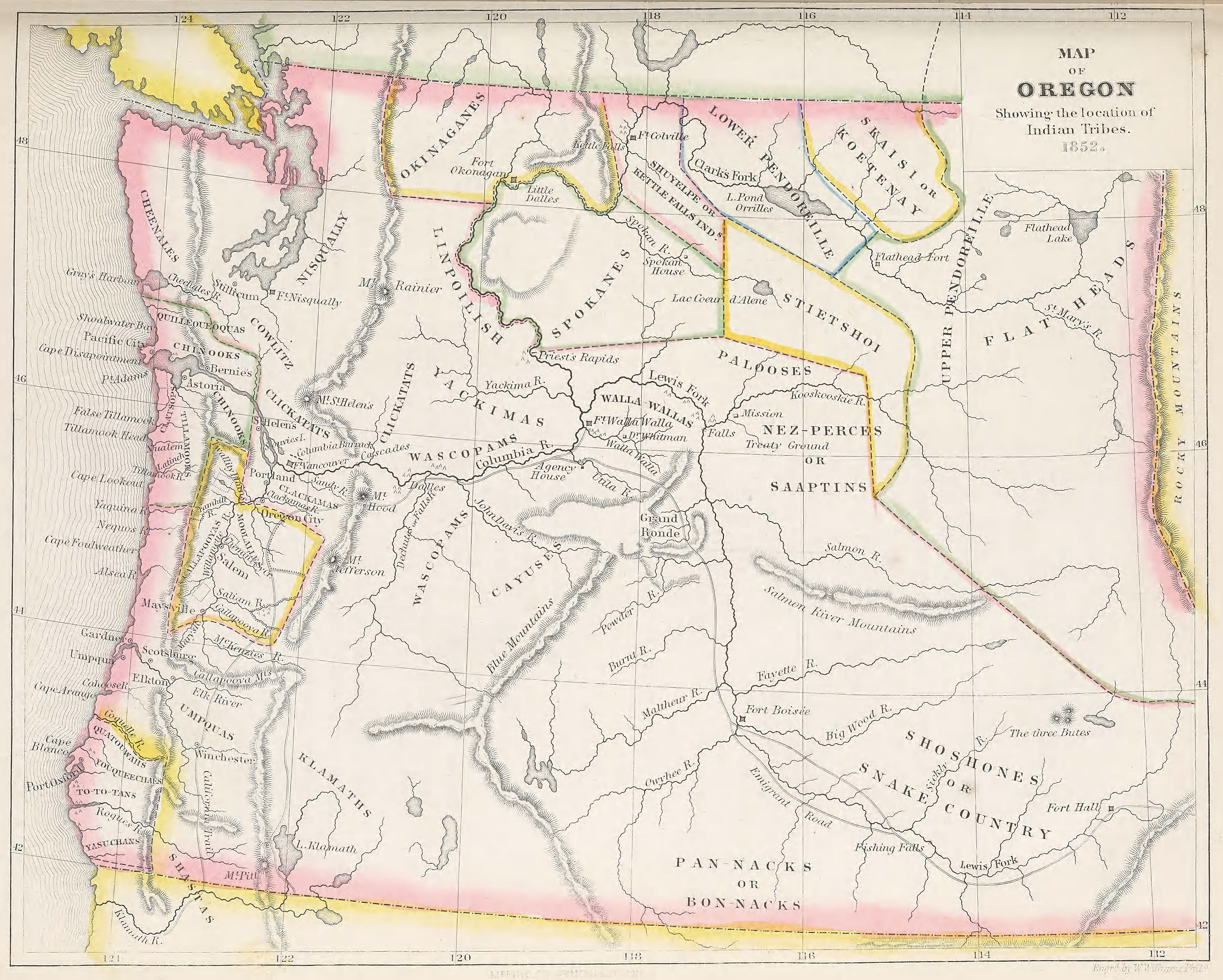
"Map of Oregon showing location of Indian Tribes, 1852"

The Indigenous populations were devastated by epidemics of infectious diseases, especially smallpox, brought in by European explorers and traders. Prior to European colonization, various reports from European explorers describe the tribes in the area bearing signs of smallpox. Nathaniel Portlock, a British ship's captain, described as having "expected to have seen a numerous tribe" but instead found "only of three men, three women" as well as the oldest of the men "marked with the small-pox", when referring to the Tlingit people in the North West Coast. Oral traditions of various tribes in the Pacific Northwest also refer to an epidemic of smallpox on the populations. There are many theories to how smallpox arrived in the Pacific Northwest. One theory is that an outbreak in central Mexico in 1779 spread north and infected the Shoshone in 1781, allowing the disease to spread into the lower Columbia River and Strait of Georgia via trade between the Flathead, Nez Perce, Walla Walla, and other various tribes. Spanish expeditions to the Northwest Coast from Mexico in 1774, 1775, and 1779 are also attributed to spreading smallpox to the local tribes in the area, with many documented outbreaks correlating to where the Spanish made landfall. Another theory describes the outbreak originating in the Kamchatka Peninsula in 1769 and spreading via Russian explorers to South Alaska and the Aleutians, thus through the Alaska panhandle and down the Pacific Coast. There were a number of later smallpox epidemics, such as the devastating 1862 Pacific Northwest smallpox epidemic.

Due to the native population having no prior exposure to Old World diseases, local tribes may have lost as much as 90% of their population. This depopulation enabled an easier colonization of the Pacific Northwest by European and American migrants.

=== Current times ===
In current times the political and current context of life for these Indigenous peoples varies, especially considering their relationship to Canada and the United States. In Canada Indigenous peoples are one of the fastest growing groups with a young and increasing population. Significant issues persist as a result of colonial laws and the now infamous Canadian Indian residential school system. Many of the most repressive elements of the Indian Act (federal legislation governing First Nations) were removed in 1951, and the right for First Nations to vote was granted in 1960. The 1951 amendment to the Indian Act lifted the potlatch ban, though the ban was never fully effective - it had pushed traditional culture underground. Since 1951 ceremonial practices and the potlatch have re-emerged widely along the coast.

One development in recent times is the revival of ocean-going cedar canoes. Beginning in the late 1980s with early Haida and Heiltsuk canoes, the revival spread quickly after the Paddle to Seattle in 1989 and the 1993 'Qatuwas canoe festival in Bella Bella. Many other journeys to different places along the coast have occurred; these voyages have come to be known as Tribal Canoe Journeys.

== Material culture ==
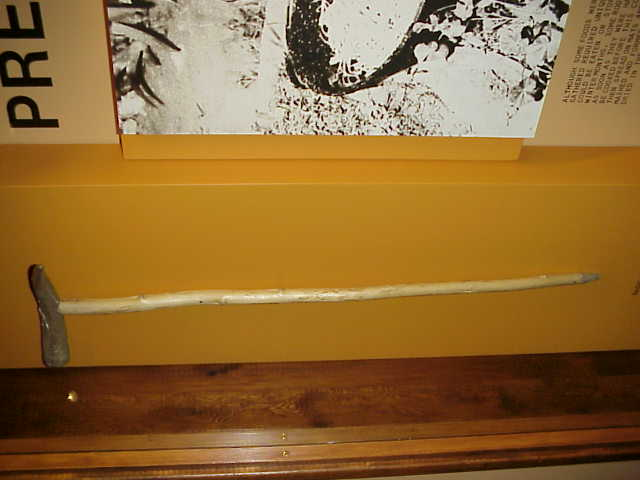
Root digging stick with handle

Both the sea and the land provided important sources of food and raw materials to Indigenous Peoples of the Northwest Coast, and many of these resources needed to be managed to ensure continual harvest. Historians and ethnographers provide evidence of cultivation practices and environment management strategies that have been used by First Nations peoples for centuries along the Northwest Coast. Practices like digging and tilling, pruning, controlled burning, fertilizing, streamscaping and habitat creation allowed Indigenous groups to intentionally manage the environment around them in order to encourage greater production of a resource for sustained harvesting.

The Pacific salmon in particular played a central role in the diet and culture of the Northwest, so much so that the Native Nations of the region define themselves as the Salmon People. The salmon were caught with hook and line or small nets, and then pierced with cedar skewers and roasted or smoked over open pit fires. Other methods of catching them could also be used however, such as traps, baskets, spears and lures. The tribe would have to rely on the dried or smoked salmon over the winter, so the first fresh fish caught in the spring was welcomed with great ceremony.

Hunting, both on land and sea, was also an important source of food. At sea this involved hunting whales, sea lion, porpoise, seal and sea otter, while deer, moose and elk were pursued on land. The plentiful supply of all these animals meant that the tribes became prosperous.

The most important plant in the diet of the Northwest Native Americans was the bulb Camassia, a member of the asparagus family. Indigenous peoples engaged in the active management and cultivation of camassia by clearing land, by tilling and weeding, and by planting bulbs. Camas plots were harvested by individuals or kin-groups, who were recognized as a particular plot's cultivators or stewards.

Indigenous peoples of the Northwest Coast harvested root crops through a process of digging and tilling. Using a digging stick made from hard wood, First Nations people would work the ground between tree roots and in bulb and rhizome patches, which loosened the compacted soil. Loosened soils made it easier to remove root crops whole and undamaged, and allowed roots, bulbs and rhizomes to grow more freely and abundantly with increased production.

Native peoples of the Pacific Northwest also used to eat a variety of fruit and berries. A favorite food was the salmonberry Rubus spectabilis, which derives its name from the fact that it was traditionally eaten with salmon and salmon roe. Blackberries Rubus, and evergreen huckleberries Vaccinium ovatum (which was eaten fresh or dried and made into cakes) were also popular. Red huckleberry Vaccinium parvifolium was both eaten and used as fish bait on account of its resemblance to salmon eggs. The Oregon grape Mahonia nervosa was sometimes eaten, mixed with sweeter berries to counteract its sour flavor.

== Society and culture ==
=== Potlatch ===
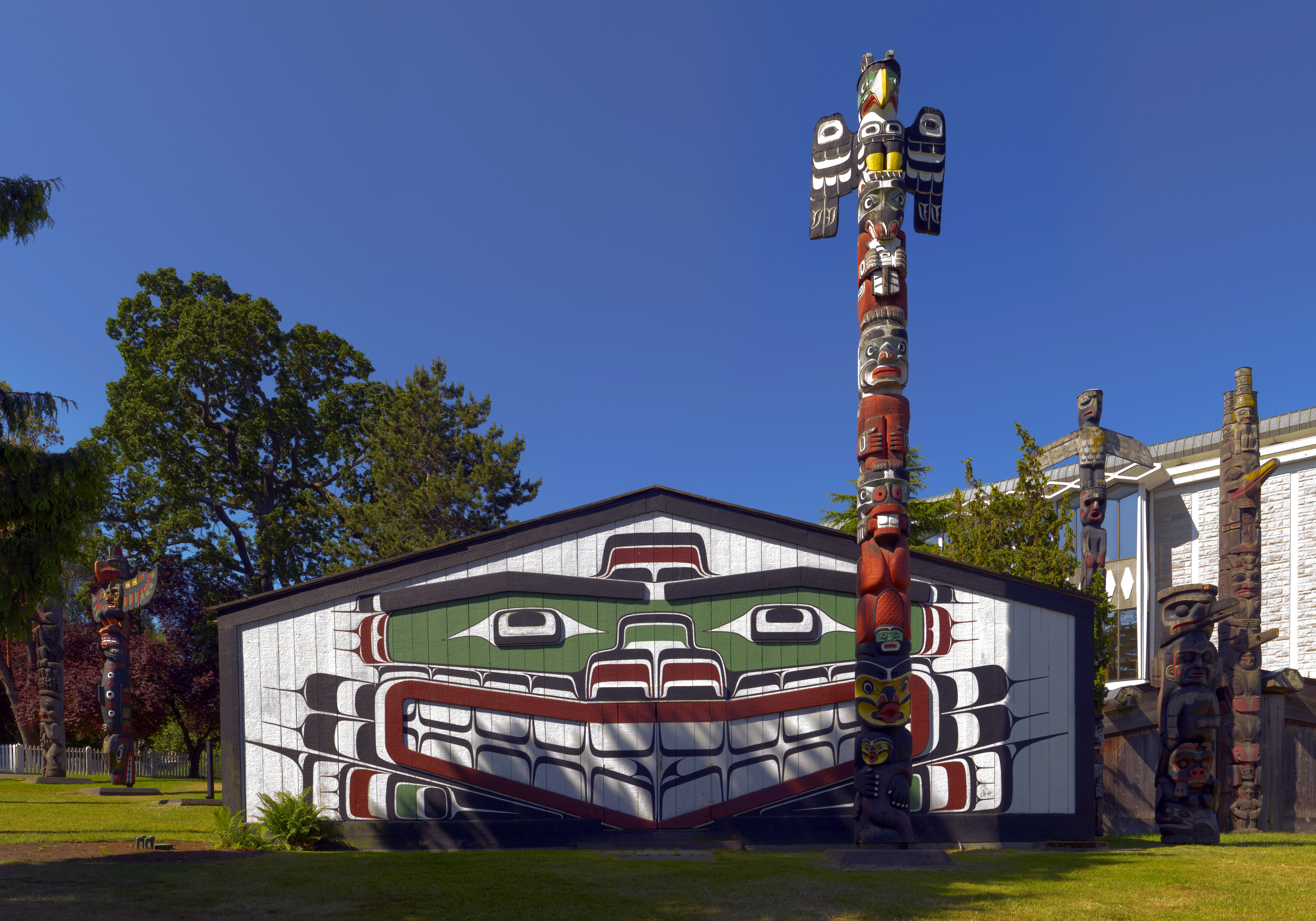
The Kwakwakaʼwakw continue the practice of potlatch. Illustrated here is Wawadit'la in Thunderbird Park, Victoria, (aka Mungo Martin House) a Kwakwaka'wakw "big house" built by Chief Mungo Martin in 1953. Very wealthy and prominent hosts would have a plank house specifically for potlatching and housing guests.

A potlatch is a highly complex event where people gather to commemorate a specific event (such as the raising of a totem pole or the appointment/election of a new chief). These potlatches would usually be held in competition with one another, providing a forum to display wealth within a tribe.

In the potlatch ceremony, the chief would give highly elaborate gifts to visiting peoples to establish his power and prestige, and by accepting these gifts the visitors conveyed their approval of the chief. There were also great feasts and displays of conspicuous consumption, such as the burning of articles, or throwing things into the sea, purely as a display of the great wealth of the chief. Groups of dancers put on elaborate dances and ceremonies. These dancers were members of secret "dancing societies". Watching these performances was considered an honor. Potlatches were held for several reasons: the confirmation of a new chief; coming of age; tattooing or piercing ceremonies; initiation into a secret society; marriages; the funeral of a chief; and battle victory.

=== Slavery ===
Before European contact, slavery was widespread in the region, with approximately 1% to 30% of a village being slaves, with the slave's position being hereditary.

=== Music ===
Among the Indigenous people of the Pacific Northwest Coast, the music varies in function and expression. Though some groups have more cultural differences than the rest (like the Coast Salish and the more northern nations), there remain many similarities.

Some instruments used by the Indigenous were hand drums made of animal hides, plank drums, log drums, box drums, along with whistlers, wood clappers, and rattles. A great deal of the instruments were used mostly in the potlatch, but also carried over in to other festivities throughout the year.

The songs employed are used with dancing, although it is also for celebration, which at times may not be accompanied by dancing. Most singing is community based. There are some solo parts, often the lead singer would begin in the first line of each round of a song, but not long solos. For some ceremonies, songs would be performed solo (without accompaniment) by both men and women.

Usually slow in tempo and accompanied by a drum, the principal function of music in this area is spiritual. Musical performance honors the Earth, Creator, Ancestors, and all aspects of the supernatural world. Sacred songs are not often shared with the wider world. Families, as well as individuals, own their own songs as property which can be inherited, sold or given as a gift to a prestigious guest at a Feast. Professional musicians existed in some communities, but their music was taught and then rehearsed, rather than passed down through tradition and ceremony. In some nation's musical cultures, those who made musical errors were punished, usually through shaming. The vocal style employs octave singing, commonly making large jumps and runs up an entire octave in only a couple of notes. Vocal rhythmic patterns are often complex and run counter to rigid percussion beats. The tribes would dance in groups in circles.

=== Art ===
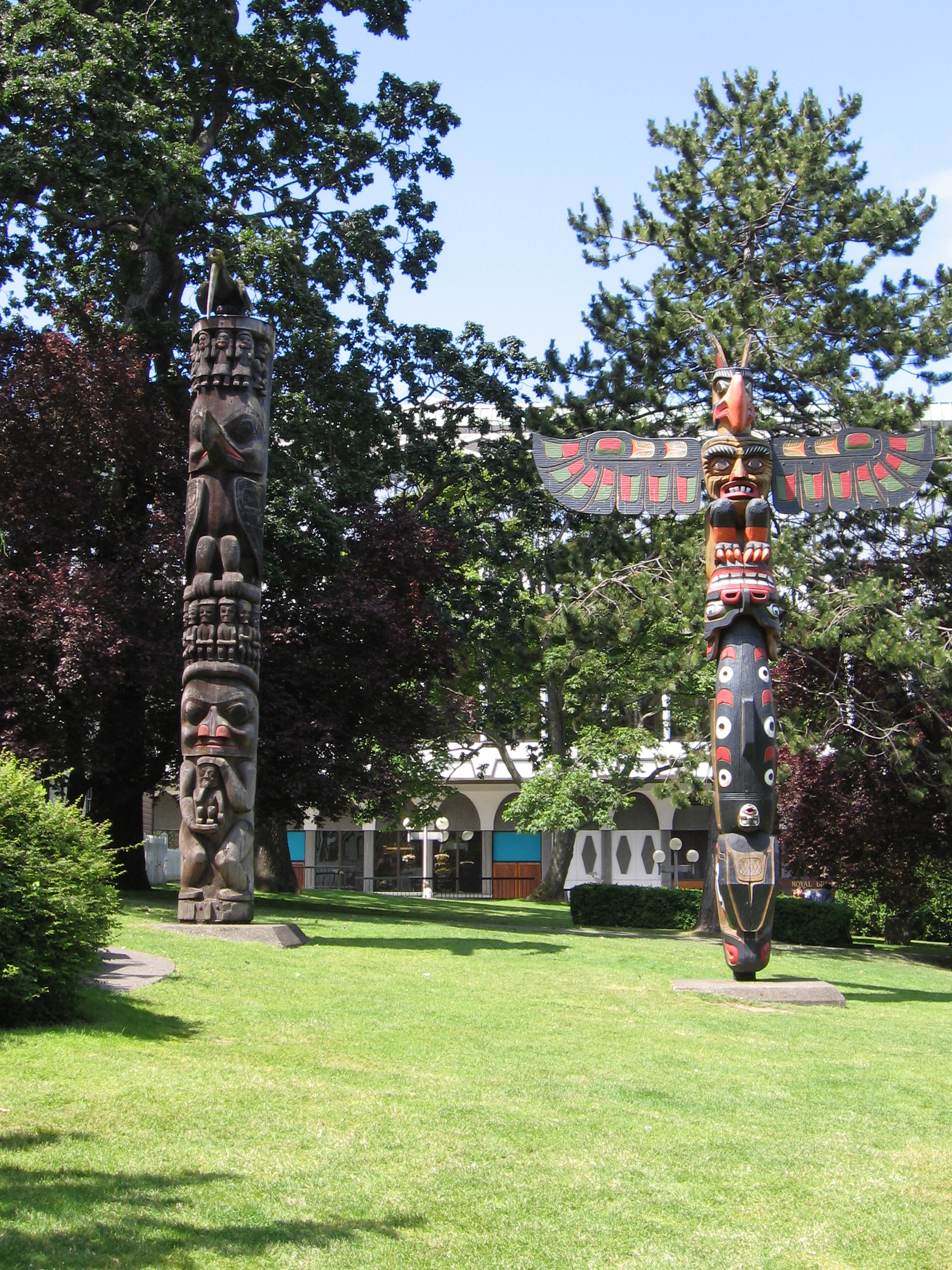
Totem poles in Victoria, British Columbia

The creation of beautiful and practical objects (for all tribal communities) served as a means of transmitting stories, history, wisdom and property from generation to generation. Art provided Indigenous people with a tie to the land by depicting their histories on totem poles the Big (Plank) Houses of the Pacific Northwest coast – the symbols depicted were a constant reminder of their birthplaces, lineages and nations.

Due to the abundance of natural resources and the affluence of most Northwest tribes, there was plenty of leisure time to create art. Many works of art served practical purposes, such as clothing, tools, weapons of war and hunting, transportation, cooking, and shelter; but others were purely aesthetic.

Pacific Northwest Coast: Spiritualism, the supernatural and the importance of the environment played integral roles in day-to-day life. Therefore, it is not unusual for their worldly goods to be adorned with symbols, crests and totems that represent some important figure(s) from both the seen and unseen worlds.

Often different northern tribes would adorn their possessions with symbols that represented a tribe as a collective (i.e., clan); this would often be a signal of differentiation among tribal groups. Such symbols could be compared to a coat of arms, or running up the flag of a country on a sailing ship, as it approached a harbour.

After the arrival of the Europeans, Indigenous artifacts suddenly became a hot commodity to be collected and placed in museums and other institutions, and many tribal groups were looted of their precious items.

In recent years, many Indigenous organizations have been calling for a return of some of their sacred items, such as masks and regalia, that symbolize their cultural heritage.

== Genetics ==
Haplogroup Q1a3a is a Y chromosome haplogroup generally associated with the Indigenous peoples of the Americas. The Q-M3 mutation appears on the Q lineage roughly 10 to 15 thousand years ago, as the migration throughout the Americas was underway by the early Paleo-Indians. The Na-Dené, Inuit and Indigenous Alaskan populations exhibit haplogroup Q (Y-DNA) mutations, however, which are distinct from other Indigenous Amerindians along with various mtDNA mutations. This suggests that the migrant ancestors of the current inhabitants of the northern extremes of North America and Greenland derived from later migrant populations.

Genetic analyses of HLA I and HLA II genes as well as HLA-A, -B, and -DRB1 gene frequencies links the Ainu people of Japan to some Indigenous peoples of the Americas, especially to populations on the Pacific Northwest Coast such as Tlingit. The scientists suggest that the main ancestor of the Ainu and of some Native American groups can be traced back to Paleolithic groups in Southern Siberia.

== See also ==
- Native Americans in the United States
- First Nations
- Alaska Natives
- Classification of indigenous peoples of the Americas
- History of the west coast of North America
- Maritime fur trade
