= Heiltsuk (disambiguation) =

The Heiltsuk are a First Nations people of British Columbia.

Heiltsuk may also refer to:

- Heiltsuk-Oowekyala language, a Wakashan language spoken in British Columbia
- Heiltsuk dialect, a dialect of Heiltsuk-Oowekyala spoken by the Heiltsuk people
- Heiltsuk Nation, the tribal government representing the Heiltsuk
