= Cockmi Indian Reserve No. 3 =

Indian reserve in British Columbia, Canada

Coordinates: 51°31′00″N 127°41′00″W

Cockmi Indian Reserve No. 3, officially Cockmi 3, is one of the three Indian reserves of the Wuikinuxv Nation band government located on the west tip of Walbran Island, which is near Darby Channel in the area of Fitz Hugh Sound on the Central Coast of British Columbia, Canada. The other two Wuikinuxv reserves are Kiltala Indian Reserve No. 2 on the Kilbella River near Kilbella Bay and Katit Indian Reserve No. 1, up the Wannock River from the community of Rivers Inlet at the entrance to Owikeno Lake.

== See also ==
- List of Indian reserves in British Columbia
