= Nicknaqueet River =

River in British Columbia, Canada

Coordinates: 51°40′18″N 127°15′41″W

The Nicknaqueet River is a river in the Central Coast region of British Columbia, Canada, flowing north into the head of Rivers Inlet just south of the mouth of the Wannock River.

== See also ==
- List of rivers of British Columbia
