= Oweekeno =

Canadian First Nations village

Coordinates: 51°40′50″N 127°13′30″W

Oweekeno is a First Nations village of the Wuikinuxv, that is located on the north bank of the Wannock River just upstream from its mouth into Rivers Inlet.

It is adjacent to the sport fishing resort community of community of the same name.
