= Oowekyala =

Northern Wakashan language of Canada

- Ooweekeeno
- ’Wuik̓ala
- Pronunciation: [ʔuwíkʼala]
- Region: Northern Central Coast Regional District, British Columbia, Canada
- Ethnicity: Wuikinuxv people
- Native speakers: 6 (2014, FPCC)
- Language family: Wakashan: Northern; Heiltsuk–Oowekyala; Oowekyala

Language codes
- ISO 639-3: –
- Glottolog: oowe1239
- Map of Wakashan languages

Oowekyala /uːˈwiːkjələ/, also Ooweekeeno and ’Wuik̓ala in the language itself, is a dialect (or a sublanguage) of Heiltsuk–Oowekyala, a Northern Wakashan language spoken around Rivers Inlet and Owikeno Lake in the Central Coast region of the Canadian province of British Columbia, spoken by the Wuikinuxv, whose government is the Wuikinuxv Nation. Its speakers consider it to be a distinct language from Heiltsuk.

== Name ==
The name of Oowekyala is derived from the root ʔəwik- 'back, inland' and the suffix -kʼala 'speech'. The same root is found in the name of the Wuikinuxv, with the suffix -inuxʷ 'tribe'. An Anglicized form of this name, Oowekeeno, has also been used to designate the language, also spelled Oweekeno, Wikeno, Owikeno, Oweekano, and Awikenox.

== Classification ==
Oowekyala is one of the Wakashan languages, a language family distributed in western coastal British Columbia. It belongs to the Northern branch of the family, which includes related languages like Kwakʼwala, Haisla, and Heiltsuk. The latter is frequently considered a dialect of the same language as Oowekyala, but there are many phonological and grammatical differences between the two. For example, Heiltsuk is a tonal language, while Oowekyala is not. Nonetheless, they are mutually intelligible.

== Phonology ==
Below, each sound is given the IPA and in the practical orthography designed by John C. Rath and used by the Wuikinuxv Nation. This orthography differs from the transcription system used by Howe (2000), which uses Americanist symbols.

=== Consonants ===
Oowekyala has 45 consonantal phonemes, as shown in the table below.

		Labial	Alveolar			Velar		Uvular		Glottal
		Labial	plain	sibilant	lateral	palatal	labial	plain	labial	Glottal
Plosive/ Affricate	tenuis	p ⟨p⟩	t ⟨t⟩	t͡s ⟨c⟩	t͡ɬ ⟨th⟩	c ⟨k⟩	kʷ ⟨kv⟩	q ⟨q⟩	qʷ ⟨qv⟩	
Plosive/ Affricate	ejective	pʼ ⟨p̓⟩	tʼ ⟨t̓⟩	t͡sʼ ⟨c̓⟩	t͡ɬʼ ⟨t̓h⟩	cʼ ⟨k̓⟩	kʷʼ ⟨k̓v⟩	qʼ ⟨q̓⟩	qʷʼ ⟨q̓v⟩	
Plosive/ Affricate	voiced	b ⟨b⟩	d ⟨d⟩	d͡z ⟨z⟩	d͡l ⟨dh⟩	ɟ ⟨g⟩	ɡʷ ⟨gv⟩	ɢ ⟨ǧ⟩	ɢʷ ⟨ǧv⟩	
Fricative				s ⟨s⟩	ɬ ⟨lh⟩	ç ⟨x⟩	xʷ ⟨xv⟩	χ ⟨x̌⟩	χʷ ⟨x̌v⟩	
Sonorant	plain	m ⟨m⟩	n ⟨n⟩		l ⟨l⟩	j ⟨y⟩	w ⟨w⟩			ɦ ⟨h⟩
Sonorant	glottalic	mˀ ⟨m̓⟩	nˀ ⟨n̓⟩		lˀ ⟨l̓⟩	jˀ ⟨y̓⟩	wˀ ⟨w̓⟩			ʔ ⟨’⟩
Sonorant	long	mː ⟨əmm⟩	nː ⟨ənn⟩		lː ⟨əll⟩					

Oowekyala lacks velar consonants that are neither palatalized nor labialized. This is an areal feature characteristic of many Indigenous Pacific Northwest languages.

Phonologically, affricates are grouped with plosives, while nasals are grouped with approximants; /ʔ/ can be analyzed as /ɦˀ/.

Glottalisation in Oowekyala plural forms
singular	plural	gloss
mam	mimˀam	'blanket, bedding, bedcover'
nusa	ninˀusa	'to tell stories, legends, myths'
lant͡sa	lilˀant͡sa	'to go underwater'
wiːkʷ	wiwˀiːkʷ	'eagle'
jlχa	jijˀlχa	'to rub, smear' (body part)
ɦusa	ɦiʔusa	'to count, tally'
ɦəçt͡sʼas	ɦiʔəçt͡sʼas	'singing for the dancers'
ɦmˀɟila	ɦiʔmɟila	'to cook'
pais	pipais	'flounder'
təwa	titəwa	'to walk'
qsu	qiqsu	'it is you'
ɬiɬami	ɬami	'to anchor, moor, tie up boat'
t͡ɬʼaː	t͡ɬʼit͡ɬʼaː	'black bear'
kʷʼxʷa	kʷʼikʷʼxʷa	'to suck the skin' (as when hurt)
spa	sispa	'to flash, reflect, beam out, echo, reach' (said of light or sound)

=== Vowels ===
Oowekyala has phonemic short, long, and glottalized vowels:

	Front			Central			Back		
	short	long	glot.	short	long	glot.	short	long	glot.
Close	i ⟨i⟩	iː ⟨ii⟩	iˀ ⟨iy̓⟩				u ⟨u⟩	uː ⟨uu⟩	uˀ ⟨uw̓⟩
Mid				ə ⟨ə⟩					
Open				a ⟨a⟩	aː ⟨aa⟩	aˀ ⟨a̓⟩			

Heiltsuk–Oowekyala is the only Wakashan language with glottalized vowels, which are extremely restricted and can only appear "as the first syllabic sonorant in a word".

=== Phonotactics ===
Oowekyala tolerates very large consonant clusters. Words can consist of obstruents alone, with no vowel and no other sonorant: qvx̌v /qʷχʷ/ 'powder', c̓kvx̌t /t͡sʼkʷχt/ 'short (of a person)', k̓vp̓sps /kʷʼpʼsps/ 'fine dirt'. Because obstruent-only roots combine with obstruent-only lexical suffixes and enclitics, whole sentences can be built without a sonorant, as in c̓kvx̌tthkc /t͡sʼkʷχtt͡ɬkt͡s/ 'the invisible one here-with-me will be short'. This property is also found in Nuxalk, an unrelated Salishan language spoken about 50 km to the northeast.

The two languages are analyzed differently, however. Bagemihl (1991) argues that obstruent-only strings in Nuxalk are never syllabified; Howe applies the same test to Oowekyala and reaches the opposite conclusion, as such strings do occur in reduplicants. Heiltsuk has the same clustering, but breaks it up with epenthetic schwas after glottalized stops and affricates, where Oowekyala does not: Heiltsuk /tʼəçtʼəkʷəs/ corresponds to Oowekyala t̓xt̓kvs /tʼçtʼkʷs/ 'fish hawk'. The two dialects also differ in prosody; besides Heiltsuk being tonal, Oowekyala has contrastive vowel and sonorant length, which Heiltsuk lacks.

== Bibliography ==
- Boas, Franz (1928). Bella Bella texts. Columbia University contributions to anthropology. Vol. 5. New York: Columbia University Press. doi:10.7312/boas90468. ISBN 9780231878890.
- Boas, Franz (1932). Bella Bella tales. Memoirs of the American Folklore Society. Vol. 25. New York: American Folk-lore Society. ISBN 9780527010775.
- Hanuse, R., Sr.; Smith, H.; Stevenson, D., eds. (1983). The Adjee and the Little Girl. Rivers Inlet, BC: Oowekyala Language Project.
- Hilton, Suzanne; Rath, John C. (1982). Oowekeeno oral traditions. Ottawa: National Museums of Canada. ISBN 9781772822472.
- Howe, Darin (1998). Aspects of Heiltsuk laryngeal phonology (Manuscript). University of British Columbia.
- Howe, Darin Mathew (2000). Oowekyala segmental phonology (PDF) (Doctoral dissertation). Vancouver: University of British Columbia. doi:10.14288/1.0090571.
- Johnson, S.; Smith, H.; Stevenson, D. (1983). What time is it?. Rivers Inlet, BC: Oowekyala Language Project.
- Johnson, S.; Smith, H.; Stevenson, D. (1983). Fishing at Rivers Inlet. Rivers Inlet, BC: Oowekyala Language Project.
- Johnson, S.; Smith, H.; Stevenson, D. (1983). Qaquthanugva uikala. Rivers Inlet, BC: Oowekyala Language Project.
- Johnson, S.; Smith, H.; Stevenson, D. (1983). Sisa'kvimas. Rivers Inlet, BC: Oowekyala Language Project.
- Johnson, S.; Smith, H.; Stevenson, D. (1983). ’Katemxvs ’Wuik’ala. Rivers Inlet, BC: Oowekyala Language Project.
- Johnson, S.; Smith, H.; Stevenson, D. (1984). Oowekyala words. Rivers Inlet, BC: Oowekyala Language Project.
- Lincoln, Neville J.; Rath, John C. (1980). North Wakashan comparative root list. Ottawa: National Museums of Canada. ISBN 9781772822304.
- Poser, William J. (2003). The status of documentation for British Columbia native languages (Report). Yinka Dene Language Institute Technical Report. Vanderhoof, British Columbia: Yinka Dene Language Institute.
- Rath, John C. (1981). A practical Heiltsuk-English dictionary. Canadian Ethnology Service, Mercury Series. Vol. 75. Ottawa: National Museum of Man. ISBN 9781772822366.
- Stevenson, David (1980). The Oowekeeno people: A cultural history (Unpublished). Ottawa, Ontario: National Museum of Man (now Hull, Quebec: Museum of Civilization).
- Stevenson, David (1982). The ceremonial names of the Oowekeeno people of Rivers Inlet (Unpublished). Ottawa, Ontario: National Museum of Man (now Hull, Quebec: Museum of Civilization).
- Storie, Susanne, ed. (1973). Oweekano Stories. Special Collections: E99. Victoria: British Columbia Indian Advisory Committee.
- Windsor, Evelyn W. (1982). Hilton, S.; Rath, J. C. (eds.). Oowekeeno oral traditions as told by the late chief Simon Walkus, Sr. Mercury Series. Vol. 84. Ottawa: National Museum of Man. ISBN 9781772822472.
