= Wuikinuxv =

Indigenous peoples in British Columbia

Total population
- 200

Regions with significant populations
- British Columbia

Languages
- English, Oowekyala

Religion
- Christianity

Related ethnic groups
- Heiltsuk, Haisla, Kwakwaka'wakw

The Wuikinuxv ([ʔuwik'inuxʷ]) are an Indigenous First Nations people of the Central Coast region of the Canadian province of British Columbia, Canada, located around Rivers Inlet and Owikeno Lake, to the north of Queen Charlotte Strait.

== Name ==
The name Wuikinuxv translates to "Backbone people". They have also been known as the Oweekano (pre-1976); Oowekeeno /əˈwiːkənoʊ/ (1976–2003), with variations: Oweekeno, Owekano, Oweekayno, Wuikenukv, Wikeno, Owikeno, Awikenox, or the Rivers Inlet people. The Wuikinuxv people and their neighbours, the Heiltsuk and Haisla peoples, were in the past sometimes known incorrectly as the "Northern Kwakiutl".

== History ==
The name used for the main village on Katit Indian Reserve No. 1, which is on an island in the Wannock River, that connects Owikeno Lake to Rivers Inlet, "Wannock", means "poison" and refers to an 1848 raid by the Heiltsuk, as recounted by John Thomas Walbran in his book about coastal names in British Columbia:

The lake is about 35 miles long, and connected with the inlet by the Oweekayno river now known by the name, adopted by the Indians, of Wannuck [sic]; the meaning of which is "poison", as in olden times visitors to the tribe, evidently unwelcome, had the reputation of dying suddenly, these deaths being attributed to poison. About 1848 this tribe suffered dreadfully through a slave raid made by the powerful Bella Bellas, who after inviting the tribe to a potlatch....awaited their guests in ambush, and as they unsuspectingly arrived, one canoe after another, poured a deadly fire into them, killing all the men and capturing the women and children. The following morning the Bella Bellas advanced on Katil [one of their oldest and principal villages being on a small island...situated in the lake at the head of the river.] making a further surprise in which 3 men and 1 woman were killed and 32 woman and children captured.

— John T. Walbran, British Columbia Coast Names, 1592-1906: their origin and history

== Language ==
Oowekyala, the language of the Wuikinuxv, is closely related to the Heiltsuk language, so much so that it is considered one of two dialects of a language named Heiltsuk–Oowekyala, the other dialect being Heiltsuk. It is also closely related to Haisla and is also related to Kwak'wala, the most widely spoken of the Northern Wakashan languages. It is more distantly related to Nuu-chah-nulth, Ditidaht and Makah, the Southern Wakashan languages.

== Government ==
The government of the Wuikinuxv people is the Wuikinuxv Nation. The Wuikinuxv Nation is a member of the Wuikinuxv-Kitasoo-Nuxalk Tribal Council, based in the town of Bella Coola.

== Location and services ==
The small community of Rivers Inlet, on the banks of the 3 km Wannock River, is the main centre in Wuikinuxv territory. Nearby is the non-Indian reserve First Nations community of Oweekeno. Rivers Inlet has an airstrip and daily service from a local airline. In summer, airline service is disrupted by the traffic in and out of the sport-fishing camps.

== Culture ==
The Wuikinuxv shared cultural similarities with neighbouring Indigenous peoples of the Pacific Coast. At its height, Wuikinuxv territory encompassed the mouth of Rivers Inlet to the headwaters of Owikeno Lake.

The Wuikinuxv constructed a Big House in 2006. This cedar building provides a space for community gatherings and ceremonies.

=== Ethnobotany ===
They eat the berries of Vaccinium vitis-idaea ssp. minus.
