= Katit Indian Reserve No. 1 =

Katit Indian Reserve No. 1 is the main Indian reserve of the Wuikinuxv people, and is one of the three reserves governed by the Wuikinuxv Nation band government. It is located in British Columbia, Canada, on the entrance to Owikeno Lake on the north side of the Wannock River near to, but separate from, the non-native community and sport fishing resort of Rivers Inlet. Similarly named Katit Island is in the Wannock River at 51°40′41″N 127°11′48″W, while Kahtit Creek is downstream, near the mouth of the Wannock River at 51°40′47″N 127°15′00″W near the Wuikinuxv village known as Oweekeno.

== See also ==
- List of Indian reserves in British Columbia
