= Heiltsuk =

Indigenous people of Central Coast, British Columbia, Canada

Híɫzaqv
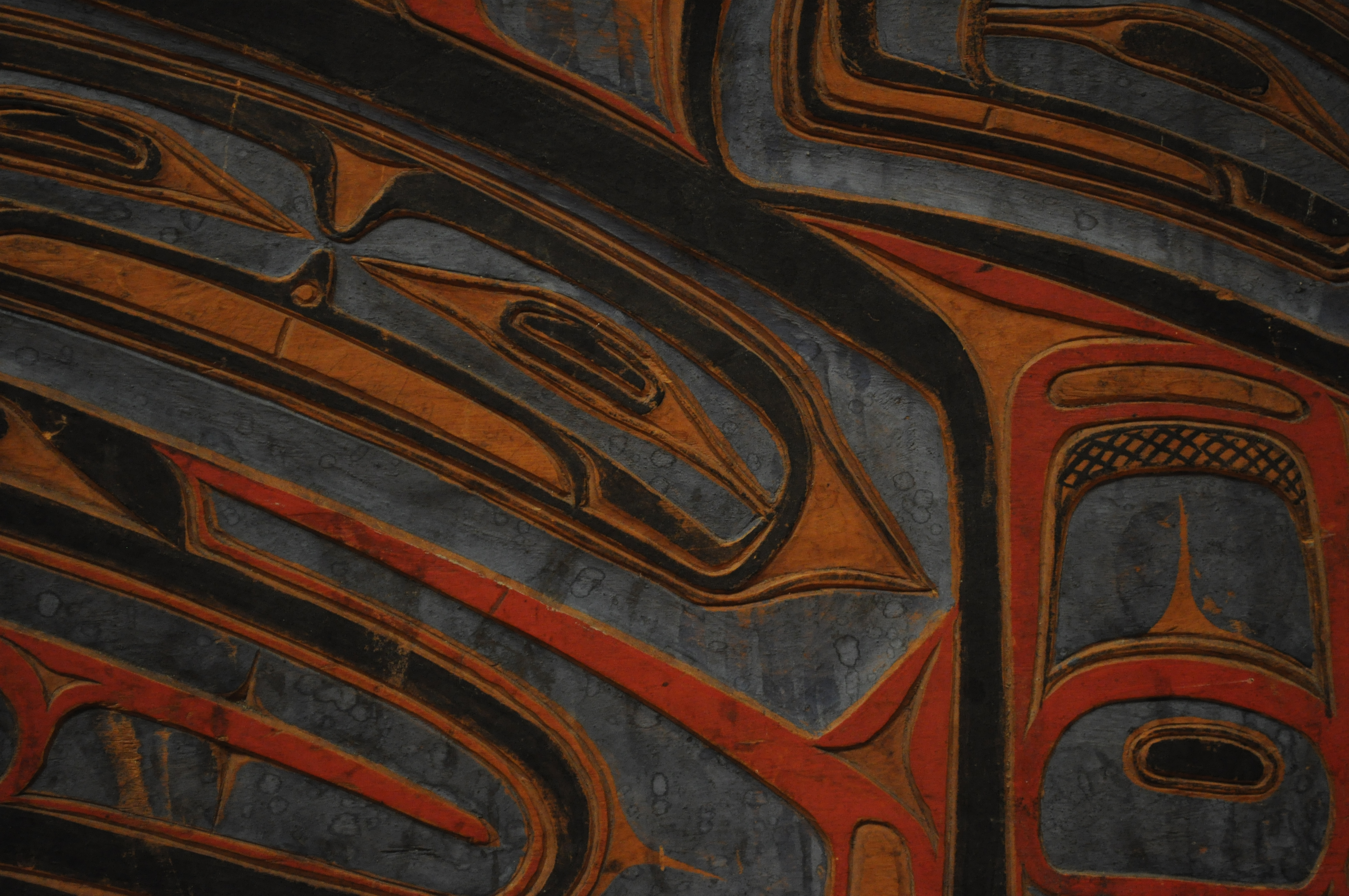
- Detail of a 19th-century bentwood chest by Heiltsuk artist Captain Richard Carpenter (Du'klwayella)

Total population
- 1,874 (1995)

Regions with significant populations
- Canada (British Columbia)

Languages
- English, Híɫzaqvḷa, Chinook Jargon

Religion
- traditional tribal religion, potlatch

- People: Haíɫzaqv (Heiltsuk)
- Language: Haíɫzaqvḷa
- Country: W̓áxv:w̓uísax̌v (Waxvwuisaxv)

The Heiltsuk /ˈheɪltsək/, sometimes historically referred to as Bella Bella, or Híɫzaqv are an Indigenous people of Waxvwuisaxv along the Central Coast of British Columbia, centred on the island community of Bella Bella. The government of the Heiltsuk people is the Heiltsuk Nation, though the term is also used to describe the community. Its largest community is Bella Bella.

They should not be confused with the Salish-speaking Nuxalk peoples, who were formerly usually called Bella Coola in English.

== History ==
Ancestors of the Heiltsuk (Haíɫzaqv) have been in the Central Coast region of British Columbia since at least 7190 BCE or possibly even up to 12,000 BCE as evidenced by a 2017 archaeological study of their traditional home on Triquet Island. The Heiltsuk (Haíɫzaqv) are the main descendants of Haíɫzaqvḷa(Heiltsuk)-speaking people and identify as being from one or more of five tribal groups: W̓úyalitx̌v (Wuyalitxv) (Seaward Tribe or Seaward Division; outside water people), Q̓vúqvay̓áitx̌v (Qvuqvayaitxv) (Calm Water Tribe or Calm Water Division), W̓u̓íƛ̓itx̌v (Wuithitxv) (Roscoe Inlet Tribe; inside water people), Y̓ísdáitx̌v (Yisdaitxv) (The Y̓ísdá Tribe, People of Y̓ísdá (Yisda), where mountains meet the sea or Mackenzie Park Division, near Elcho Harbour on Dean Channel), who came together in Bella Bella (Q̓ḷ́c (’Qélc), meaning "Slippery") in the 19th century.

The Heiltsuk (Haíɫzaqv) practiced a set of cultural expressions that have been grouped together with other, similar groups under the term "Northwest Coast". These expressions include organization into extended family groups, linkage to origin stories, ranking and differentiation in status, ownership of non-physical prerogatives, seasonal movement to harvest resources centred on large permanent "winter villages", sophisticated use of wood, stone and other items, complex ceremonies and elaborate social interactions culminating in the "potlatch".

Rediscovered in recent years by a collaboration between archaeologists and traditional knowledge-holders, clam gardens extend throughout the coast of BC.

The Heiltsuk (Haíɫzaqv) were renowned among their neighbours for their artistic, military, ceremonial, and spiritual expertise.

=== Contact and the fur trade period ===
Their first contact with Europeans was most likely in 1793, and the name "Bella Bella" dates back to 1834. They generally refer to themselves as Heiltsuk. As with many other indigenous peoples of the Pacific Northwest Coast they were subject to drastic population loss as a result of introduced diseases and heightened military conflicts with neighbouring peoples during the fur trade era.

As the fur trade began they also became known as skilled traders. Highly skilled in canoe making and later shipbuilding, a number of trading schooners were made in Bella Bella by the canoe makers who had learned to make western style vessels. For a time they acted as middlemen in the fur trade, benefiting from early access to guns. The traders complain in some of their records of the Heiltsuk being hard to trade with, passing off land otter skins for sea otter, demanding extra large blankets, then cutting them to standards size for retrade and sewing the extra pieces together to make more blankets.

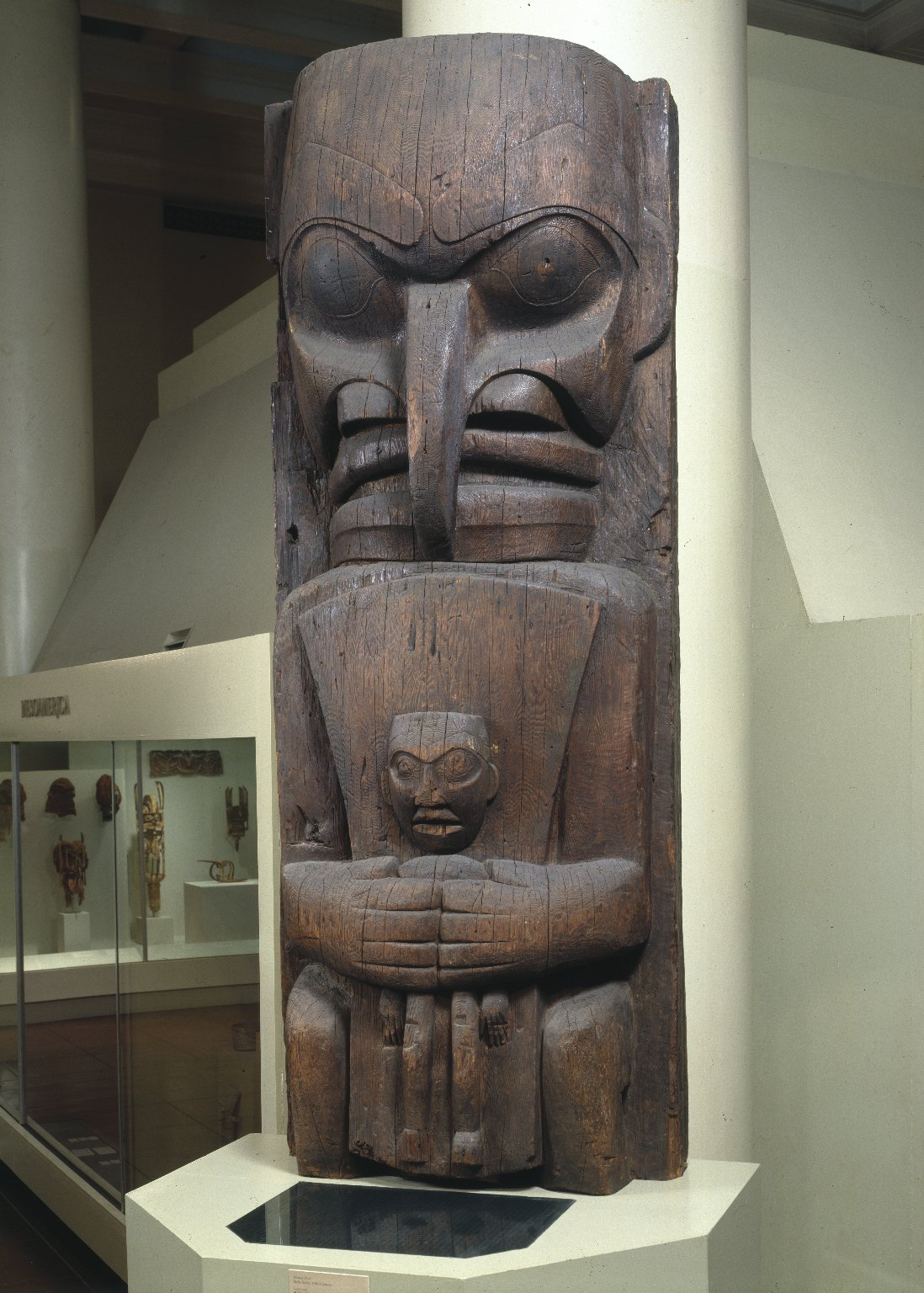
Heiltsuk (Bella Bella) (Native American). House Post, from a Set of Four, 19th century. Cedar wood, Brooklyn Museum

A significant feature of Bella Bella society was the development of a cadre of highly skilled artisans noted for their construction and decoration of bentwood boxes, chests, canoes, and horn spoons and ladles. After White contact the skills of these artisans were turned to the market demand for canoes and boxes.

— Susan F. Hilton, Haihais, Bella Bella, and Oowekeeno

The Heiltsuk experienced significant population loss due to introduced diseases, and conflict. A war between the Heiltsuk and the Haida involved reciprocal attacks, ending in 1852 with an agreement that has been characterized as a peace treaty.

==== Founding of 'Bella Bella' at McLoughlin Bay ====
Between 1832 and 1900, some of the Heiltsuk built a village in McLoughlin Bay, adjacent to the Hudson's Bay Company's Fort McLoughlin. Called Bella Bella or Qlts, the community saw a number of other Heiltsuk groups join through the late 1800s.

For the period before 1897 the name Bella Bella refers only to 'Qelc, or to Old Bella Bella (Old Town), at McLoughlin Bay.

— Martha Black, Bella Bella: A Season of Heiltsuk Art

==== Move from Old Bella Bella to new Bella Bella ====
The Heiltsuk community at Old Bella Bella (located at McLoughlin Bay) were forced to relocate the community to the site of the present-day village of Bella Bella (aka Waglisla) because of colonists attempting to exterminate the community with smallpox blankets.

By 1903, the Heiltsuk had founded and largely moved into the current village of Bella Bella.

Like other First Nations on the coast, the Heiltsuk were subjected to repeated attempts of genocide by the colonists, primarily by means of smallpox, which killed the majority of the population. The 1862 Pacific Northwest smallpox epidemic alone killed about 72% of the Heiltsuk people. The population collapse caused the Heiltsuk to coalesce into fewer communities, and reduced the population to just under 225 by 1919. Like other First Nations, the expected demise of the Heiltsuk did not occur. Instead, the population rebounded following the 1918 Spanish flu epidemic and, as of September 2014, was well over 2,500.

When the McKenna–McBride Royal Commission visited Bella Bella in 1913, they were told:

We are the natives of this Country and we want all the land we can get. We feel that we own the whole of this Country, every bit of it, and ought to have something to say about it. The Government have not bought any land from us so far as we know and we are simply lending this land to the Government. We own it all. We will never change our minds in that respect, and after we are dead our children will still hold on to the same ideas. It does not matter how long the Government take to determine this question, we will remain the same in our ideas about this matter... We consider that the Government is stealing that land from us, and we also understand that it is unlawful for the Government to take this land."

— Bob Anderson

The Heiltsuk have continuously maintained they have the right to self-determination and continue to hold title to the Territory. Accordingly, many members have asserted rights. From this situation arose recognition by the Supreme Court of Canada (in R v Gladstone) of a Heiltsuk commercial Aboriginal right to herring. This was a first for Canada.

The Heiltsuk have always based their food gathering significantly on the sea. The 1997 Gladstone decision (R v Gladstone) recognized a commercial Aboriginal right to herring – particularly herring eggs – based on the pre-contact history of harvest and trade. The Heiltsuk and Canada have been in dispute over implementation of the Gladstone decision and related management issues.

This dispute boiled over during the 2015 herring season with the Heiltsuk occupying a Department of Fisheries and Oceans (DFO) office for four days. The dispute was sparked when DFO allowed a herring seine fishery that the Heiltsuk had opposed, citing continuing conservation concerns and doubts regarding DFO's predictive model. The crisis ended when the herring gillnet fleet departed the area without fishing.

== Culture ==
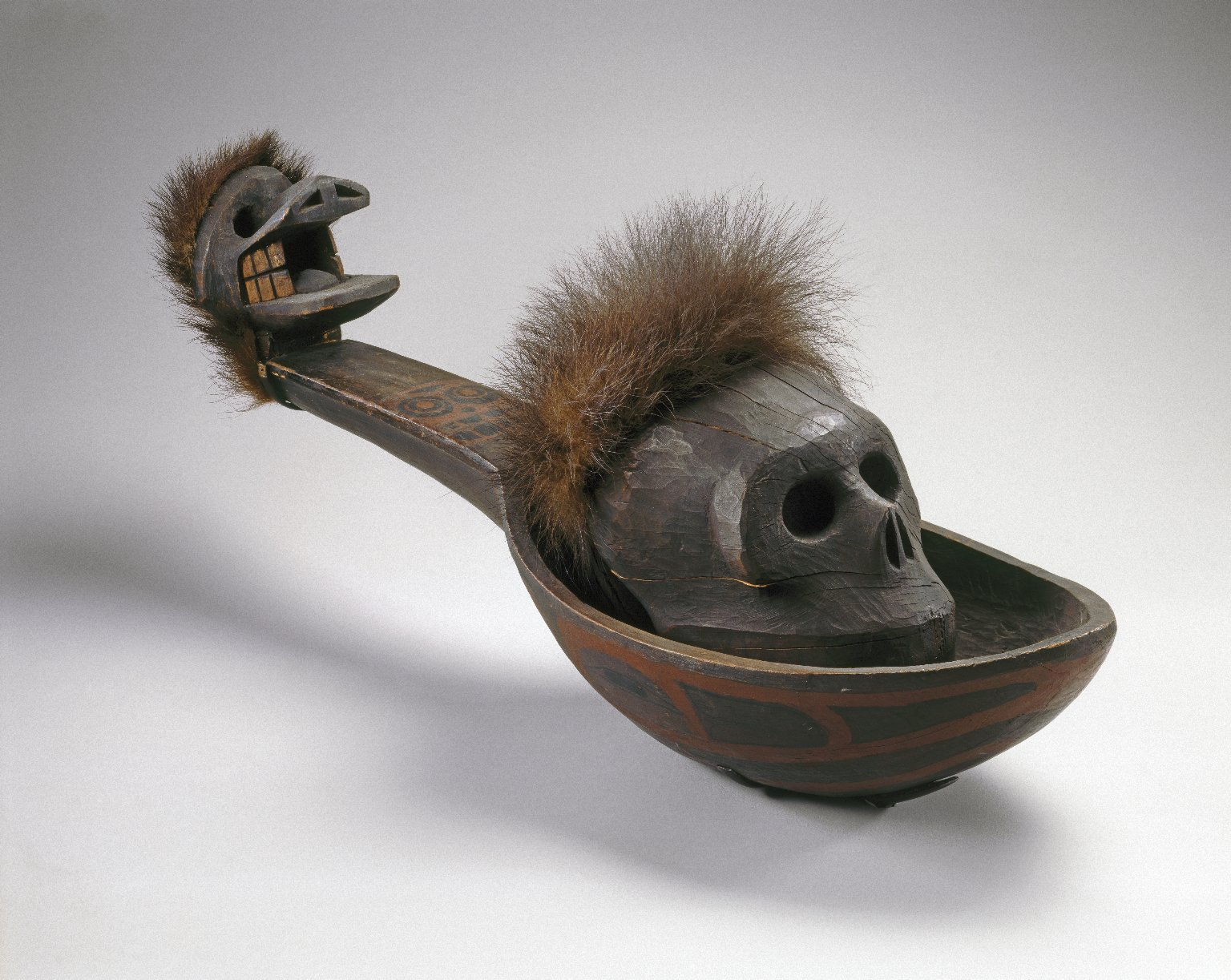
Heiltsuk, Ladle with Skull, 19th century, Brooklyn Museum

Traditionally, the Heiltsuk divided the year into a secular summer harvesting season and a winter sacred season, when most ceremonies were conducted.

The pattern of Heiltsuk resource use has changed somewhat in the past two hundred years, but has been remarkably stable given the pressures and changes that have been experienced by the Heiltsuk people. The Heiltsuk year is divided into two primary parts, the winter ceremonial season and the harvest season. These divisions are general; some harvest may occur during the winter and the odd ceremony may be required during the harvest season, but the distinction is quite clear.

— Heiltsuk Tribal Council, Occupation, use and management of the "Hakai-Spiller Hotspot" by the Heiltsuk Nation

The Heiltsuk were (and are) renowned for their ceremonies, arts, and spiritual power. The two dimensional style of design – called formline art – or Northwest Coast art – extends along the north coast, the central coast and down to Vancouver Island. The Heiltsuk are part of this tradition – with several painters from the historic period being recorded. Among these Captain Carpenter, a canoe-maker and painter is perhaps the most well-known.

Prior to the mid-nineteenth century, Heiltsuk-speaking tribes occupied numerous independent villages throughout their territory; the names of twenty-four permanent villages and established temporary camps have been recorded. It appears that diverse styles of painting were practised by Heiltsuk painters of this period and perhaps later. These styles most likely originated within individual villages or social groups.

— Bill McLennan and Karen Duffek, The Transforming Image: Painted Arts of Northwest Coast First Nations

Skull imagery is usually associated with the Tánis (Hamatsa) ceremony practised by the Heiltsuk and Kwakwakaʼwakw people. Hamatsa is a secret society that is involved ceremonial cannibalism and rituals to return to humanity. Young males are initiated into the community during a four-part ritual in which they are symbolically transformed from flesh-eating cannibals, a state equated with death, into well-behaved members of society. The skull thus symbolizes the rebirth of initiates as they come back from the dead. Skull items are used during the final stages of the ceremony: ritual feeding of the skull, possibly using special ceremonial spoons, precedes a ceremonial meal for the initiates, and the officiating medicine man might wear a skull headdress.

Heiltsuk culture has been and is known for its ceremonial, military, and artistic skills. The Heiltsuk were early participants in the revival of the ocean-going cedar canoes during the 1980s, attending Expo 86, participating in Tribal Canoe Journeys, including the 1989 Paddle to Seattle. The Heiltsuk canoe "Glwa" has made many trips since being carved in the 1980s.

The Canadian federal government, spurred by Christian missionaries, outlawed the potlatch under the Indian Act. The ban took effect in the 1870s but was not fully enforced until much later, most vociferously after 1923. Heiltsuk Chiefs were angered by the ban and the missionary interference in their traditional customs. The ban lasted until the Indian Act was amended in 1951. According to Heiltsuk oral tradition, though the ban was lifted, no one informed the Heiltsuk at the time. The missionaries saw the potlatch as the basis for Heiltsuk (and more broadly for other First Nations on what anthropologists label the Northwest Coast) social and political organization, and as the most obvious expression of non-Christian beliefs, to which they were opposed.

Though the Potlatch system did not die out entirely among the Heiltsuk, it was forced underground. Missionary influence in Bella Bella was significant from the late 19th century. The missionary served as religious authority, doctor (with control over health), and magistrate. Chiefs responded by hosting Christmas feasts, where even the most ardent colonist could not stop the distribution of gifts. Reports of feasts held in the houses of Chiefs from this time include accounts of the chiefs simply waiting out the missionary until he got too tired and went home to bed. Then they could conduct their traditional business.

=== Art and ceremonial expression ===
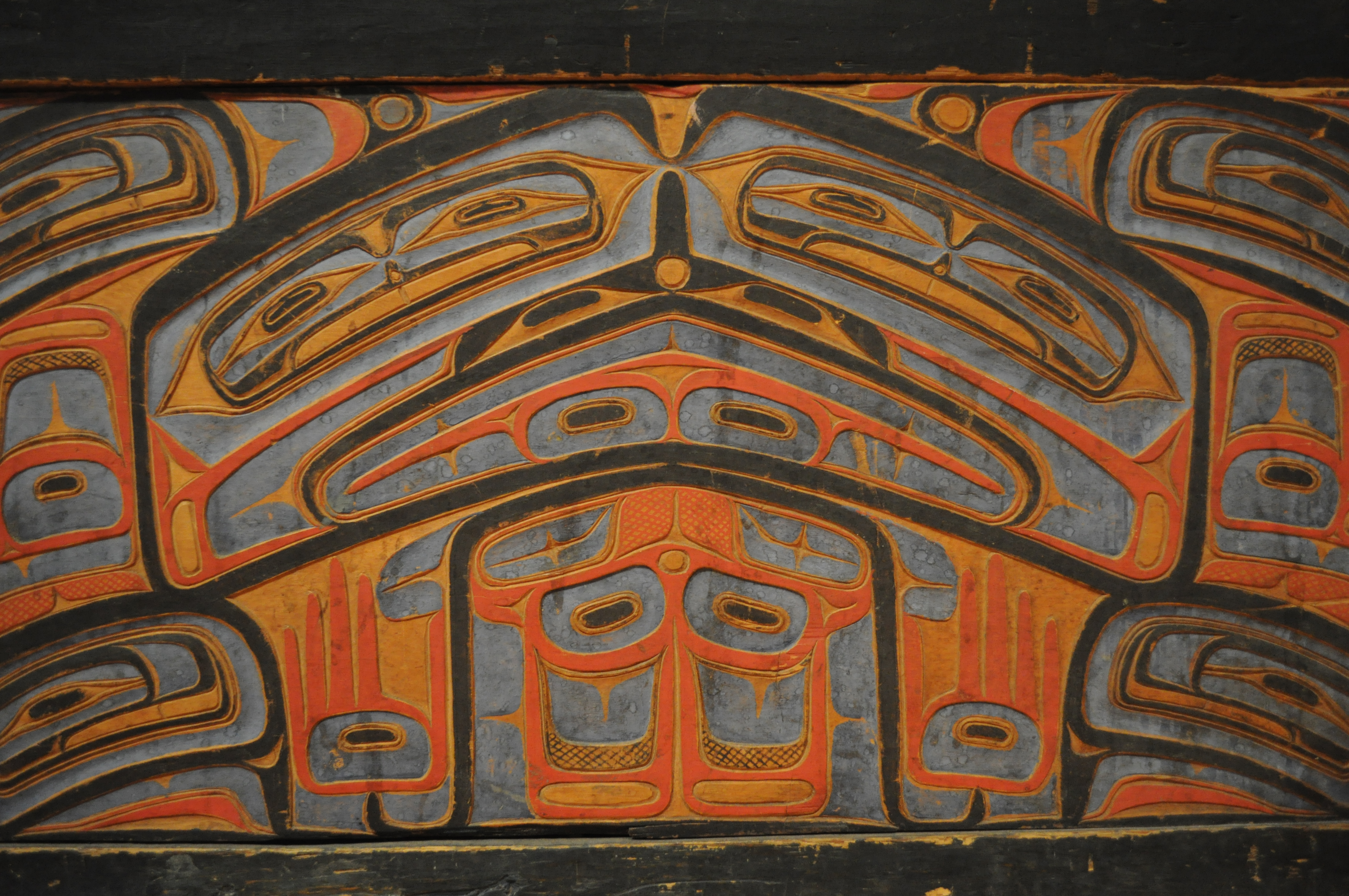
Richard Carpenter bent-wood chest detail 01

The Heiltsuk were well known for their skills as carpenters, carvers, painters, and ceremonial experts.

The two-dimensional style of design – called formline art – or Northwest Coast Style – extends along the north coast, the central coast and down to Vancouver Island. The Heiltsuk are part of this tradition – with several painters from the historic period being recorded. Among these Captain Carpenter, a canoe-maker and painter is perhaps the most well-known.

Early known Heiltsuk artists from the colonial period include:

- Chief Robert Bell (1859–1904)
- Enoch (d. 1904)
- Captain Carpenter (1841–1931)
- General Dick (aka Old Dick – 1822–1902?)
- Daniel Houstie (1880–1912)

=== Post-1951 ===
The 1951 amendment to the Indian Act (Canada's law regarding First Nations), removed some of the most repressive elements, including the ban on the potlatch. While the Heiltsuk continued to practice elements of the feast system in secret, it was not until after the ban that it began to emerge into public light again. During the late 1960s and continuing through the 1980s the Heiltsuk experienced a revival of potlatching and feasting that continues to this day. Where once the community was dominated by a strict version of Methodism, by the 1990s the Heiltsuk were once again regularly hosting potlatches, feasts and other ceremonial events.

A resurgence in First Nations cultural expressions has been occurring throughout British Columbia. The Heiltsuk are part of this cultural and political rise, seeing an increase in artists, carvers, singing, and efforts to strengthen and restore the language. Arts that were in danger of being lost are being taught again.

The 1975 National Film Board of Canada film by Barbara Greene titled "Bella Bella" records a time of rapid change, an interesting historical vignette of the community.

The Heiltsuk have played a key role in the resurgence of the ocean going canoe culture along the Pacific Northwest Coast when they first carved a canoe and paddled from Bella Bella to Vancouver for Expo 86, in 1986 and in 1989 participated in the "Paddle to Seattle", and at this event invited other tribes to travel to Bella Bella and hosted the 1993 Qatuwas Festival.

— Evangeline Hanuse, Nuxalk Nation takes part in historic paddle to Qatuwas Festival in Bella Bell

The resurgence of building traditional ocean going canoes is one of a number of cultural and ceremonial practices and technologies that have regained strength among BC First Nations. The canoe revival, also called Tribal Canoe Journeys involve many communities and Nations.

In 1993 the Heiltsuk hosted a gathering of ocean-going canoes, known as 'Qatuwas. First Nations from as far away as Washington state and all along the BC Coast paddled to Bella Bella. This gathering was a major event and part of a wider movement among First Nations to revive and strengthen the traditions of ocean-going dugout canoes. The 1993 event more than doubled the population of the community for the ten days it ran.

The popular exhibit Kaxlaya Gvi'ilas was a partnership between the Heiltsuk, the Museum of Anthropology at UBC (MOA), curator Pam Brown (Heiltsuk scholar), the Royal Ontario Museum, and Martha Black author of Bella Bella: A Season of Heiltsuk Art. A collaborative exhibit, it contained a combination of historical pieces from the Royal Ontario Museum's R.W. Large Collection and contemporary artwork from the Heiltsuk village of Waglisla (Bella Bella). The exhibit travelled after its initial showing in the Royal Ontario Museum, to Vancouver (MOA 2002), Montreal (McCord Museum, McGill University) and Owen Sound, Ontario.

The Heiltsuk have strongly opposed oil and gas development, and the transportation of oil through Heiltsuk territory. The proposed Northern Gateway pipeline was the subject of considerable opposition from the Heiltsuk. In April 2012 the Joint-Review Panel assessing the proposed pipeline cancelled part of the hearings scheduled for Bella Bella.

The Heiltsuk travelled to Masset, Haida Gwaii for a renewal of a peace treaty on September 20, 2014, that dates to the end of the Heiltsuk-Haida wars of the 19th century. In 2015 the treaty was finalized and ratified in Bella Bella at a potlatch where the Haida chiefs were also in attendance.

A second canoe gathering occurred in July 2014 – also known as 'Qatuwas – and featured more canoes (close to 60) than the original festival in 1993. Both events (1993 and 2014 'Qatuwas Festivals) featured ocean-going canoes from many other First Nations, cultural sharing including dancing, singing, sharing stories, and food.

== Heiltsuk herring and the Gladstone decisions ==
The Heiltsuk have relied on herring for thousands of years. Traditional harvest of herring and herring spawn are a significant part of Heiltsuk culture – and part of a history of trade. The Heiltsuk have long asserted their right to fish for and trade herring. The precedent-setting Canadian Supreme Court of Canada R v Gladstone case found a pre-existing Aboriginal right to herring that includes a commercial component.

== Oil, gas and Enbridge Northern Gateway Pipelines ==
The Heiltsuk have been vigorously opposed to oil and gas development and transport through Heiltsuk territory for forty years, since the oil ports inquiry in the 1970s. This longstanding position was elaborated during land use planning in the 1990s and 2000s but came to a head during the Enbridge Northern Gateway Pipelines proposal and process.

The Joint Review Panel travelled to the Heiltsuk Nation in April 2012 for hearings into the Enbridge Northern Gateway Pipeline proposal. By some counts, a third of Bella Bella's 1,095 residents were on the street that day, one of the largest demonstrations in the community's history. Facing non-violent protest as part of the greeting at the local airport – the JRP members suspended the hearings for a day and a half. While the hearings did resume – substantial time had been lost, meaning fewer people could present to the JRP than had planned.

== Language ==
The Heiltsuk dialect is part of what is called the Wakashan language family. Related to other languages in the group as French is to Spanish, the Heiltsuk language is similar to Wuikyala (the language of the Rivers Inlet people, the Wuikinuxv). Heiltsuk, Wuikyala, Haisla and Kwakʼwala languages form the Northern Wakashan language group. Heiltsuk and Wuikyala are both tonal languages, which Kwakʼwala is not, and both are considered dialects of the Heiltsuk-Oowekyala language.

Heiltsuk, a rich and complex language with both conversational and ceremonial forms, is spoken at Bella Bella (Wágḷísḷa) and Klemtu (Ɫṃ́du̓ax̌sṃ), with today two subdialects centered in these two communities, the Híɫzaqvḷa (Bella Bella dialect) and the X̌íx̌íc̓ala (Klemtu dialect). Like Oowekyala (a closely related language spoken by the Oweekeno of Rivers Inlet), Haisla (the language of the people of Kitiamaat), and Kwakwala (spoken by the Kwakwaka'wakw to the south), it is a North Wakashan language.

— Martha Black, Bella Bella: A Season of Heiltsuk Art

The Heiltsuk were also users of the Chinook Jargon, particularly during the fur trade period. Not a full language, the jargon allowed communications across the many linguistic barriers, both among First Nations and explorers. The Heiltsuk terms for Americans during this time was Boston or 'Boston-man' – derived from Chinook and pronounced booston. Most American fur trade vessels originated in New England – hence the term Boston. A Brit was a King-George-Man.

Through a memorandum of understanding signed in 2016, the Heiltsuk Cultural Education Centre, the Bella Bella Community School and the University of British Columbia's First Nations and Endangered Languages Program are partnering in an effort to collaboratively create new opportunities for speaking, writing and reading the Híɫzaqv (Heiltsuk) language by expanding and deepening existing community language revitalization and cultural documentation in a digital environment.

== Notable people ==
- Eden Robinson – author
- Carla Robinson – television journalist

== See also ==
- The Canadian Crown and Indigenous peoples of Canada
- Triquet Island
