= Heiltsuk–Oowekyala language =

Northern Wakashan language

Heiltsuk–Oowekyala
- Region: Northern Central Coast Regional District, British Columbia, Canada
- Ethnicity: 2,530 Heiltsuk and Oowekyala people (2014, FPCC)
- Native speakers: 66 (Note: 60 Heiltsuk and 6 Oowekyala) (2014, FPCC)
- Language family: Wakashan: Northern; Heiltsuk–Oowekyala
- Dialects: Heiltsuk; Oowekyala

Language codes
- ISO 639-3: hei
- Glottolog: heil1246
- ELP: Hailhzaqvla (Heiltsuk)
- Map of Wakashan languages

Heiltsuk–Oowekyala is a Northern Wakashan (Kwakiutlan) language spoken in the Central Coast region of the Canadian province of British Columbia, spoken by the Wuikinuxv (Oweekeno) and Heiltsuk peoples. It has two dialects, Heiltsuk (Bella Bella) and Oowekyala (Wuikyala), which unlike other Wakashan languages are tonal. It has no traditional name, so the hyphenated construction Heiltsuk–Oowekyala is used by linguists. Ethnologue calls this language "Heiltsuk", with the Bella Bella dialect (Heiltsuk) labelled "Northern Heiltsuk" and the Oowekyala dialect labeled "Southern Heiltsuk".

Heiltsuk [ɦiɬtsʰaqʷ] is spoken by the Bella Bella [pʰəlbálá] and Haihais [xíxís] peoples; Oowekyala [ʔuwíkʼala] by the Wuikinuxv [ʔuwikʼinuxʷ].

== Phonology ==
Heiltsuk–Oowekyala, like Nuxalk (Bella Coola), allows long sequences of obstruents, as in the following 7-obstruent and 8-obstruent words from the Oowekyala variety: c̓k̓ʷx̌tƛkc [t͡sʼkʷʼχtʰt͡ɬkʰt͡sʰ] 'the invisible one here-with-me will be short' or tpxʷpsƛkc 'the invisible one-here-with-me will be squeezed pleasantly' like the Nuxalk kxlqsłcxʷ 'you struck a match for me'.

== Writing system ==
The spelling adopted by the Heiltsuk Education Cultural Center was designed by John C. Rath, linguistic consultant Heiltsuk Cultural Center in the 1970s and 1980s.

Heiltsuk alphabet
b	p	p̓	m	ṃ́	ṃ	m̓	ṃ̓	d	t	t̓	n	ṇ́	ṇ	n̓	ṇ̓	z	c	c̓	ꟛ (λ)
ƛ	ƛ̓	ɫ	l	ḷ́	ḷ	l̓	ḷ̓	g	k	k̓	x	y	í	i	y̓	i̓	gv	kv	k̓v
xv	w	u	ú	w̓	u̓	ǧv	qv	q̓v	x̌v	ǧ	q	q̓	x̌	h	á	a	h̓	a̓	

In Rath's spelling, the lambda letters ꟛ (λ), ƛ, ƛ̓ can be replaced by dh, th, t̓h if they are not accessible on the keyboard. Similarly, ɫ can be replaced by lh.

Oowekyala alphabet
a	b	c	c̓	d	dh	g	h	i	k	kv	k̓	k̓v	l	lh	l̓	m	m̓	n	n̓
p	p̓	q	qv	q̓	q̓v	s	t	th	t̓	t̓h	u	w	w̓	x	xv	x̌	x̌v	y	y̓
z	ǎ	ǧ	ǧv	əl	əm	ən													

== Bibliography ==
- Boas, Franz. (1928). Bella Bella texts. Columbia University contributions to anthropology (No. 5).
- Boas, Franz. (1932). Bella Bella tales. Memoirs of the American Folklore Society (No. 25).
- Hanuse, R. Sr.; Smith, H.; & Stevenson, D. (Eds.) (1983?). The Adjee and the Little Girl. Rivers Inlet, BC: Oowekyala Language Project.
- Hilton, Suzanne; & Rath, John C. (1982). Oowekeeno oral traditions. Ottawa: National Museums of Canada.
- Howe, Darin. (1998). Aspects of Heiltsuk laryngeal phonology. Ms., University of British Columbia.
- Howe, Darin Mathew (December 2000). Oowekyala segmental phonology (PDF) (PhD). University of British Columbia. hdl:2429/12958.
- Johnson, S.; Smith, H.; & Stevenson, D. (1983?). What time is it? Rivers Inlet, BC: Oowekyala Language Project.
- Johnson, S.; Smith, H.; & Stevenson, D. (1983?). Fishing at Rivers Inlet. Rivers Inlet, BC: Oowekyala Language Project.
- Johnson, S.; Smith, H.; & Stevenson, D. (1983?). Qaquthanugva uikala. Rivers Inlet, BC: Oowekyala Language Project.
- Johnson, S.; Smith, H.; & Stevenson, D. (1983?). Sisa'kvimas. Rivers Inlet, BC: Oowekyala Language Project.
- Johnson, S.; Smith, H.; & Stevenson, D. (1983?). ’Katemxvs ’Wuik’ala. Rivers Inlet, BC: Oowekyala Language Project.
- Johnson, S.; Smith, H.; & Stevenson, D. (1984?). Oowekyala words. Rivers Inlet, BC: Oowekyala Language Project.
- Lincoln, Neville J.; & Rath, John C. (1980). North Wakashan comparative root list. Ottawa: National Museums of Canada.
- Poser, William J. (2003). The status of documentation for British Columbia native languages. Yinka Dene Language Institute Technical Report (No. 2). Vanderhoof, British Columbia: Yinka Dene Language Institute.
- Rath, John C. (1981). A practical Heiltsuk–English dictionary. Canadian Ethnology Service, Mercury Series paper (No. 75). Ottawa: National Museum of Man (now Hull, Quebec: Museum of Civilization).
- Rath, John (1986). Heiltsuk alphabet (PDF). Heiltsuk Cultural Education Centre. Archived from the original (PDF) on 2021-12-10.
- Stevenson, David. (1980). The Oowekeeno people: A cultural history. Ottawa, Ontario: National Museum of Man (now Hull, Quebec: Museum of Civilization). (Unpublished).
- Stevenson, David. (1982). The ceremonial names of the Oowekeeno people of Rivers Inlet. Ottawa, Ontario: National Museum of Man (now Hull, Quebec: Museum of Civilization). (Unpublished).
- Storie, Susanne. (Ed.). (1973). Oweekano Stories. (Special Collections: E99). Victoria: British Columbia Indian Advisory Committee.
- Windsor, Evelyn W. (1982). Oowekeeno oral traditions as told by the late chief Simon Walkus, Sr. Hilton, S.; & Rath, J. C. (Eds.). Mercury series (No. 84). Ottawa: National Museum of Man (now Hull, Quebec: Museum of Civilization).
