= First Peoples' Cultural Council =

First Nations advocacy group in Canada

The First Peoples' Cultural Council (FPCC) is a First Nations-run provincial crown corporation in British Columbia (BC), Canada, which supports the revitalization of First Nations languages, arts and cultural heritage in BC. FPCC's activities include grant programs, producing research and informational resources, and providing technological tools such as the FirstVoices web platform and digital keyboards for First Nations languages. Tracey Herbert, CEO since 2003, has said that supporting revitalization is "not just about grant money. It’s about rebuilding our cultural infrastructure and supporting knowledge keepers to transfer what they know."

== Overview ==
FPCC is based in Brentwood Bay on Tsartlip First Nation. The organization was formerly known as the First Peoples' Heritage, Language and Culture Council, but shortened its name in 2012. It was established in 1990 by the First Peoples’ Heritage, Language and Culture Act, and reports to the Minister for Indigenous Relations & Reconciliation.

The mandate of the organization is to:

- Provide funding to First Nations cultural and language programs
- Support and advise government and First Nations leadership on initiatives, programs and services related to First Nations arts, language and culture
- Provide services and resources to help revitalize the cultural legacy of First Nations people
- Advocate for First Nations heritage and culture

Base funding for FPCC is provided through the BC Ministry of Indigenous Relations and Reconciliation and further funds are raised through partnerships with public and private agencies (including the New Relationship Trust, the BC Arts Council and the Department of Canadian Heritage).

== Programs ==
=== Language Program ===
FPCC's Language Program collaborates with B.C. First Nation communities and individuals working to carry their language into the future. The Language Program provides advocacy, funding, training and resources to support First Nations language revitalization in B.C. FPCC's Language Program offers a variety of programs to meet individuals and communities where they're at in the language learning journey.

=== Arts Program ===
FPCC's Arts Program supports B.C. First Nations artists working in both ancestral and contemporary arts, to positively impact creative sovereignty in their respective activities, knowledge transfer, training and professional development. The Arts Program supports the creation, development, production, and promotion across all forms of creative expression.

=== Heritage Program ===
FPCC's Heritage Program was established in 2019 to support the safeguarding, transmission and revitalization of Indigenous cultures and heritage. It focuses on the three goals listed below.

1. Capacity: First Nations communities in B.C. have the tools, training, staff and spaces to be stewards of their cultural heritage.

2. Stewardship: First Nations communities in B.C. have programs, funding and autonomy to be stewards of their cultural heritage.

3. Leadership: The rights of Indigenous Peoples' to be stewards of their cultural heritage is recognized and affirmed, and Indigenous expertise is valued.

== Resources and initiatives ==
=== First Peoples' Map ===
The First Peoples' Map was created by First Peoples' Cultural Council in collaboration with First Nations communities, language champions, Elders, Knowledge Keepers, cultural workers and Indigenous artists. It is a living and interactive space that represents the diverse yet interwoven languages, arts, and cultural heritage in B.C., Canada. The online map can be used to view First Nations language regions, place names, community landmarks, Indigenous artists and artworks. You can hear the pronunciation of language names, greetings, places and more.

=== FirstVoices ===
FirstVoices.com is an internationally recognized online platform for Indigenous communities to share and promote their languages, oral cultures and linguistic histories. Interactive language learning resources, such as audio recordings, words, phrases, songs and stories, are uploaded by communities to a secure, community-owned site. Ownership and copyright of all language content on FirstVoices is maintained by the contributing community. Operating since 2003, FirstVoices.com is a joint initiative of the First Peoples' Cultural Council and the First Peoples' Cultural Foundation.

==== FirstVoices Apps ====
FirstVoices mobile apps bring the wealth of language data on FirstVoices.com to the user's fingertips on their Apple's iOS or Android mobile devices. The apps pull content directly from FirstVoices.com, offering offline access to text, audio recordings, images and videos.

==== FirstVoices Keyboards ====
FirstVoices Keyboards is an Indigenous language app available for free download on Apple and Android mobile devices. The FirstVoices Keyboards App offers 100+ custom keyboards in First Nations languages in British Columbia, Canada, and around the world so users can text, email, use social media, word processing or other apps in their mother languages.

=== Endangered Languages Project ===
The Endangered Languages Project (ELP) is a nonprofit organization that supports language champions worldwide through sharing knowledge, building collaborations, and growing the global language revitalization movement. ELP is an online space where users can record, access, share and research Indigenous languages and access language revitalization resources. The First Peoples' Cultural Council supports the Endangered Languages Project in partnership with the Department of Linguistics at the University of Hawaiʻi at Mānoa, and we serve on the Governance Council (board).

=== Report on the Status of B.C. First Nations Languages ===
FPCC monitors the status of B.C. First Nations languages, arts, cultures and heritage, and provides support to First Nations communities to recover and sustain their culture. FPCC is committed to gathering and sharing current and accurate information on the state of First Nations languages in British Columbia and continues to provide funding and support for First Nations language and cultural preservation and enhancement. Every four years, FPCC releases a report on the Status of B.C. First Nations Language.

- 2010 Report on the Status of First Nations Languages
- 2014 Report on the Status of First Nations Languages
- 2018 Report on the Status of First Nations Languages
- 2022 Report on the Status of First Nations Languages

=== FPCC Toolkits ===
FPCC has developed revitalization toolkits to support B.C. First Nations in their efforts to revitalize their language, arts and cultural heritage practices. The toolkits contain a collection of practical resources to support the development of arts, language, culture and heritage revitalization programs in First Nations communities.

== Additional resources ==
=== Language legislation ===
Bill C-91, an Act respecting Indigenous languages, became law on June 21, 2019. The legislation was co-developed by the Department of Canadian Heritage and the three national Indigenous organizations: the Assembly of First Nations (AFN), the Inuit Tapiriit Kanatami (ITK) and the Métis National Council (MNC).

First Peoples' Cultural Council actively supported the development of the Act through the facilitation of engagement with B.C. First Nations, advocacy with the two Ministers of Heritage and the department, participation on the AFN's Technical Committee on Language and presentations to the parliamentary and senate committees reviewing the bill.
