= Wannock River =

- Mouth of Wannock River

Location
- Country: Canada
- Province: British Columbia

Physical characteristics
- Source: Owikeno Lake
  - location: Coast Mountains
- Mouth: Rivers Inlet, British Columbia
  - location: Rivers Inlet
  - coordinates: 51°40′40″N 127°15′25″W
  - elevation: 0 m (0 ft)
- Length: 6 km (3.7 mi)

The Wannock River is a short river in the Central Coast region of British Columbia, Canada, draining Owikeno Lake and entering Rivers Inlet at the head of that inlet, adjacent to the town of the same name, which is the main modern settlement of the Wuikinuxv (Owikeno) people. Katit Indian Reserve No. 1 is located around the banks of the river, including Katit Island, which is an island in the river.

== Name ==
The river has also been known as the Owikeno River or Oweekayno River, but was renamed:

The lake is about 35 miles long, and connected with the inlet by the Oweekayno river now known by the name, adopted by the Indians, of Wannuck (sic); the meaning of which is "poison", as in olden times visitors to the tribe, evidently unwelcome, had the reputation of dying suddenly, these deaths being attributed to poison. About 1848 this tribe suffered dreadfully through a slave raid made by the powerful Bella Bellas, who after inviting the tribe to a potlatch....awaited their guests in ambush, and as they unsuspectingly arrived, one canoe after another, poured a deadly fire into them, killing all the men and capturing the women and children. The following morning the Bella Bellas advanced on Katil [one of their oldest and principal villages being on a small island...situated in the lake at the head of the river.] making a further surprise in which 3 men and 1 woman were killed and 32 woman and children captured.

== See also ==
- List of rivers of British Columbia
- Whonnock, British Columbia
- Unuk River
