= Rivers Inlet, British Columbia =

Rivers Inlet
- Interactive map of Rivers Inlet
- Coordinates: 51°41′00″N 127°15′00″W
- Country: Canada
- Province: British Columbia
- Area codes: 250, 778

Rivers Inlet is an unincorporated settlement and First Nations community of the Wuikinuxv (Owikeno) people, located at the head of the inlet of the same name in the Central Coast region of British Columbia, Canada. The community is located adjacent to the Wannock River, a short waterway connecting Owikeno Lake to the head of Rivers Inlet.
