= Heiltsuk dialect =

Dialect of Heiltsuk-Oowekyala

Heiltsuk
- Bella Bella
- Haíɫzaqvḷa
- Pronunciation: /ɦíɬtsaqʷʰ/
- Region: Northern Central Coast Regional District, British Columbia, Canada
- Ethnicity: Heiltsuk people
- Native speakers: 195 (2021 census)
- Revival
- Language family: Wakashan: Northern; Heiltsuk-Oowekyala; Heiltsuk

Language codes
- ISO 639-3: –
- Glottolog: bell1263
- ELP: Hailhzaqvla (Heiltsuk)
- Map of Wakashan languages

- Heiltsuk is classified as Critically Endangered by the UNESCO Atlas of the World's Languages in Danger.

- People: Haíɫzaqv (Heiltsuk)
- Language: Haíɫzaqvḷa
- Country: W̓áxv:w̓uísax̌v (Waxvwuisaxv)

Heiltsuk (/ˈheɪltsək/, Haíɫzaqv), also known as Heiltsuk-Xai’xais, Bella Bella, or Haihais, is a dialect of the North Wakashan (Kwakiutlan) language Heiltsuk-Oowekyala that is spoken by the Xai'xais and Heiltsuk First Nations peoples of the Central Coast region of the Canadian province of British Columbia. Bella Bella is the headquarters of the Heiltsuk Nation government. There are only seven fluent speakers left of Heiltsuk.

Heiltsuk is spoken in the villages of Bella Bella and Klemtu, both located on coastal islands in British Columbia not far from Bella Coola and Ocean Falls. Together with Oowekyala (spoken in Rivers Inlet), it forms Heiltsuk–Oowekyala, which, like neighbouring Haisla (spoken in Kitimaat) and Kwak'wala (in Alert Bay, Port Hardy, and various other settlements), is part of the Northern Wakashan language group. Some sources instead count Heiltsuk and Oowekyala as separate languages, which gives four Northern Wakashan languages. Heiltsuk has both conversational and ceremonial forms.

== Varieties ==
Heiltsuk has two main varieties. Speakers of four subdialects, W̓úyalitx̌v, Q̓vúqvay̓áitx̌v, W̓u̓íƛ̓itx̌v and Y̓ísdáitx̌v, live mainly in Bella Bella (Wágḷísla) and call their language Haíɫzaqvḷa or Heiltsuk. Speakers in Klemtu (Ɫṃ́du) call their language X̌íx̌ís or Xai’xais. The two communities are ethnically distinct: most people in Klemtu share ancestry with the Kitasoo, a southern Tsimshianic people.

The two varieties differ in some vocabulary and in how often an epenthetic schwa is inserted, which happens more in Xai’xais. For example, 'day' is [kʷʼqʰəlá] in Heiltsuk and [kʷʼəqʰəlá] in Xai’xais. However, there is no differences in tone between the varieties: speakers in Klemtu do not correct the tone of words in recordings and materials from Bella Bella, and there are no changes in tone in older recordings from either community.

== Phonology ==
=== Consonants ===
The following is a chart of the consonants in Heiltsuk.

		Bilabial	Alveolar			Velar		Uvular		Glottal
		Bilabial	plain	sibilant	lateral	palatal	labial	plain	labial	Glottal
Plosive/ Affricate	tenuis	p ⟨b⟩	t ⟨d⟩	ts ⟨z⟩	tɬ ⟨λ⟩	c ⟨g⟩	kʷ ⟨gv⟩	q ⟨ǧ⟩	qʷ ⟨ǧv⟩	ʔ ⟨ʔ⟩
Plosive/ Affricate	aspirated	pʰ ⟨p⟩	tʰ ⟨t⟩	tsʰ ⟨c⟩	tɬʰ ⟨ƛ⟩	cʰ ⟨k⟩	kʷʰ ⟨kv⟩	qʰ ⟨q⟩	qʷʰ ⟨qv⟩	
Plosive/ Affricate	ejective	pʼ ⟨p̓⟩	tʼ ⟨t̓⟩	tsʼ ⟨c̓⟩	tɬʼ ⟨ƛ̓⟩	cʼ ⟨k̓⟩	kʷʼ ⟨k̓v⟩	qʼ ⟨q̓⟩	qʷʼ ⟨q̓v⟩	
Fricative				s ⟨s⟩	ɬ ⟨ɫ⟩	ç ⟨x⟩	xʷ ⟨xv⟩	χ ⟨x̌⟩	χʷ ⟨x̌v⟩	
Sonorant	plain	m ⟨m⟩	n ⟨n⟩		l ⟨l⟩	j ⟨y⟩	w ⟨w⟩			ɦ ⟨h⟩
Sonorant	glottalic	ˀm ⟨m̓⟩	ˀn ⟨n̓⟩		ˀl ⟨l̓⟩	ˀj ⟨y̓⟩	ˀw ⟨w̓⟩			ˀɦ ⟨h̓⟩

The resonants in intervocalic forms function similarly to vowels, and so will be charted below.

=== Vowels ===
There are three vowel phonemes in Heiltsuk, /i, a, u/, which are written as ⟨i, a, u⟩, although nine other sounds are heard as allophones [ɨ, ɪ, ʊ, ɛ, ə, ɔ, æ, ʌ, ɑ]. Schwa [ə] is considered nearly always epenthetic. It has no mora, so it never carries stress or tone.

Some descriptions treat the letters ⟨i̓, a̓, u̓⟩ as glottalized vowels. Howe (2004, 2005) and Janzen (2025) instead analyse them as a schwa followed by a glottalized resonant or a glottal stop, [əˀj], [əʔ] and [əˀw], which have no mora.

=== Syllable structure ===
In Janzen's analysis, the mora, not the syllable, is the unit that carries stress and tone. A syllable has a mora if it contains a full vowel, or a schwa followed by a plain (non-glottalized) resonant in the coda. The syllabic resonants ⟨ṃ, ṇ, ḷ⟩ also have a mora. A schwa in an open syllable, a schwa followed by a glottalized resonant, and the glottalized syllabic resonants ⟨ṃ̓, ṇ̓, ḷ̓⟩ have no mora.

Syllable types
Moraic	Non-moraic
CV, CVR	Cə
CəR	CəˀR
syllabic ⟨ṃ, ṇ, ḷ⟩	glottalized syllabic ⟨ṃ̓, ṇ̓, ḷ̓⟩

C = consonant; V = full vowel; R = plain resonant; ˀR = glottalized resonant.

The spelling does not show schwa. A dot below ⟨ṃ, ṇ, ḷ⟩ marks either a syllabic resonant or a schwa followed by the resonant, even when the two are in different syllables. In zu̓ṇ́ [tsəˀwə́n] 'coho salmon', ⟨ṇ́⟩ stands for [ə́n] and carries the high tone. When the clitic =ux̌v is added, the syllables change and the high tone moves to the vowel: zu̓ṇúx̌v [tsəˀwənúχʷ].

A word can begin with a voiceless consonant that belongs to no syllable and has no schwa after it, as in tgvánṃ́ [tʰ.kʷán.ḿ̩] 'person' and pk̓vs [pʰ.kʷʼəs] 'sasquatch'. This feature is shared with neighbouring Oowekyala and Nuxalk. The plural prefix copies only this first consonant, as in títgvánṃ́ [tʰítʰkʷánḿ̩] 'people'.

Syllabic resonants keep their mora before a vowel. In tgvánṃ́ax̌i [tʰkʷánḿ̩aχi] 'person there', the high tone is on ⟨ṃ́⟩ and not on the following vowel. Such a resonant is then both the nucleus of its own syllable and the onset of the next.

When a word that ends in a full vowel takes a vowel-initial clitic, the final vowel can be reduced to a schwa and a resonant, and the resonant becomes the onset of the next syllable: ǧvu̓í [qʷəˀwí] 'raven', ǧvu̓iáx̌i [qʷəˀwəjáχi] 'raven there'. After a spread high tone this does not happen; a glide or glottal stop is inserted instead, as in [χáwí] 'loon', [χáwíʔaχi] 'loon there'.

=== Stress and tone ===
Vowels and the syllabic resonants /m n l/ can take either high or low tone. High tone is written with an acute. Syllabic resonants are marked with a dot underneath (⟨ṃ ṇ ḷ⟩). Glottalized resonants may also be syllabic (⟨ṃ̓ ṇ̓ ḷ̓⟩), but may only take low tone.

			Bilabial	Alveolar	Lateral	Palatal	Velar	Glottal
voiced	consonantal		m ⟨m⟩	n ⟨n⟩	l ⟨l⟩	j ⟨y⟩	w ⟨w⟩	ɦ ⟨h, ħ⟩
voiced	vocalic	high	ḿ̩ ⟨ṃ́⟩	ń̩ ⟨ṇ́⟩	ĺ̩ ⟨ḷ́⟩	í ⟨í⟩	ú ⟨ú⟩	á ⟨á⟩
voiced	vocalic	low	m̩ ⟨ṃ⟩	n̩ ⟨ṇ⟩	l̩ ⟨ḷ⟩	i ⟨i⟩	u ⟨u⟩	a ⟨a⟩
glottalized	consonantal		ˀm ⟨m̓⟩	ˀn ⟨n̓⟩	ˀl ⟨l̓⟩	ˀj ⟨y̓⟩	ˀw ⟨w̓⟩	ˀɦ ⟨h̓⟩
glottalized	vocalic	low	ˀm̩ ⟨ṃ̓⟩	ˀn̩ ⟨ṇ̓⟩	ˀl̩ ⟨ḷ̓⟩	ˀi ⟨i̓⟩	ˀu ⟨u̓⟩	ˀa ⟨a̓⟩

The velar and glottal resonants are sometimes preaspirated.

According to Janzen (2025), earlier accounts by Rath (1985) and Howe (2004, 2005) treated tone as arising mostly from the sounds of a word, for example by tracing some low tones to an earlier glottalization. Janzen instead analyses Heiltsuk as a mixed tone–stress system, in which high pitch comes either from stress or from a tone that is part of a morpheme.

In this analysis, Heiltsuk has the stress rule of the other Northern Wakashan languages: stress falls on the leftmost mora (see Syllable structure) and is realized as high pitch. Unlike those languages, Heiltsuk does not place stress on the last syllable of a word with no mora; such a word has no high pitch. For example, pk̓vs [pʰkʷʼəs] 'sasquatch' has no high pitch, but pk̓vsáx̌i [pʰkʷʼəsáχi] 'sasquatch there' does. Some common function words, such as his [ɦis] 'with' and la [la] 'at', never have high pitch.

Many morphemes, mostly roots but also some suffixes and clitics, also have a lexical tone pattern: /H/, /L/, /HL/ or /LH/. The last is rare. The tones of a root associate with morae from left to right, one tone per mora, and tones with no free mora are deleted. Stress then adds a high tone to the leftmost mora that has no tone. Morae with no tone have low pitch. A lexical high tone thus sounds the same as stress, and a lexical low tone sounds the same as a toneless mora. Adding the clitic =ax̌i 'there' shows the full pattern of a root:

Root tone patterns with =ax̌i 'there'
Root tone	Word	IPA	Pitch by mora	Gloss
none	c̓áqax̌i	[tsʼáqʰaχi]	H L L	'goat there'
/L/	q̓usáx̌i	[qʼusáχi]	L H L	'lake there'
/H/	kva̓útáx̌i	[kʷʰəʔútʰáχi]	H H L	'music there'
/HL/	t̓ísṃáx̌i	[tʼísm̩áχi]	H L H L	'rock there'

In t̓ísṃáx̌i, for example, the root's /H/ and /L/ take the first two morae, and stress takes the third.

A high tone also spreads to the next mora across a plain resonant consonant, so núyṃ́ [nújḿ̩] 'story' has one high tone on two morae. Some words, such as p̓ála [pʼála] 'work', do not show this spread.

Some suffixes have their own lexical tone, such as -tíwá in lágvustíwá [lákʷustʰíwá] 'go up'. The plural prefix, which copies the first consonant of the stem followed by ⟨í⟩, carries a high tone and removes all other lexical tones from the stem: t̓ísṃáx̌i 'rock there' becomes t̓ít̓ísṃax̌i [tʼítʼísm̩aχi] 'rocks there'.

== Writing system ==
Heiltsuk is written in modern times with the alphabet below, used by both the Heiltsuk and Kitasoo/Xaixais Nations. The letter ⟨ħ⟩ is a rare spelling variant of ⟨h⟩.

Heiltsuk alphabet
b	p	p̓	d	t	t̓	z	c	c̓	s
λ	ƛ	ƛ̓	ɫ	g	k	k̓	x	gv	kv
k̓v	xv	ǧv	qv	q̓v	x̌v	ǧ	q	q̓	x̌
m	ṃ́	ṃ	m̓	ṃ̓	n	ṇ́	ṇ	n̓	ṇ̓
l	ḷ́	ḷ	l̓	ḷ̓	y	í	i	y̓	i̓
w	ú	u	w̓	u̓	h	á	a	h̓	a̓
ħ	ʔ								

This orthography also sometimes uses a colon ⟨:⟩ after a reduplicated first part of a word, as in miás:miasa 'to eat meat', dúxv:dukva 'to troll (repeatedly)' and Haí:h̓aíɫzaqv 'Haíɫzaqv (plural)'. Not all sources write the colon: the revised spelling in Rath's alphabet guide gives ƛ̓áƛ̓ál̓a 'to hunt for black bear', beside ƛ̓á 'black bear'.

== Bibliography ==
- Boas, Franz (1928). Bella Bella texts. Columbia University contributions to anthropology. Vol. 5. New York: Columbia University Press.
- Boas, Franz (1932). Bella Bella tales. Memoirs of the American Folklore Society. Vol. 25. New York: American Folklore Society.
- Howe, Darin Mathew (2000). Oowekyala segmental phonology (PDF) (Doctoral dissertation). Vancouver: University of British Columbia. doi:10.14288/1.0090571.
- Mithun, Marianne (1999). The languages of Native North America. Cambridge: Cambridge University Press.
- Poser, William J. (2003). The status of documentation for British Columbia native languages (Report). Yinka Dene Language Institute Technical Report. Vanderhoof, British Columbia: Yinka Dene Language Institute.
- Rath, John C. (1974). "On the Phonological Description of the Heiltsuk Language" (PDF). Dutch Contributions to the 9th International Conference on Salish Languages.
- Rath, John C. (1981). A practical Heiltsuk-English dictionary with a grammatical introduction. Mercury Series paper, Canadian Ethnology Service. Vol. 75, vols. I & II. Ottawa: National Museums of Canada.
- Rath, John C. (1986). Heiltsuk alphabet (PDF). Heiltsuk Cultural Education Centre. Archived from the original (PDF) on 2021-12-10.
- Windsor, Evelyn W. (1982). Hilton, S.; Rath, J. (eds.). Oowekeeno oral traditions as told by the late chief Simon Walkus, Sr. Mercury series. Vol. 84. Ottawa: National Museum of Man.
