= Rivers Inlet =

Inlet on the coast of British Columbia, Canada

- Location in British Columbia
- Location: British Columbia, Canada
- Coordinates: 51°40′39″N 127°18′42″W
- Type: Fjord
- Ocean/sea sources: Pacific Ocean

Rivers Inlet is a fjord in the Central Coast region of the Canadian province of British Columbia, its entrance off Fitz Hugh Sound, about 125 km (78 mi) southwest of the community of Bella Coola and about 65 km (40 mi) north of the northern tip of Vancouver Island and the western entrance of the Queen Charlotte Strait.

Rivers Inlet was a major fishing area with huge salmon runs. At one time it had the second largest sockeye salmon run only to the Fraser River. A total of 19 Canneries were built in the area starting late in the 1890s. Three canneries remained as they dotted the shorelines until their closure by consolidation through the monopoly of companies, and the consolidation around large centralized ice plants in the 1950s.

== Name origin ==
Rivers Inlet was named by George Vancouver for George Pitt the 1st Baron Rivers (1721–1803). Two of his men, Peter Puget and Joseph Whidbey, first charted it in 1792.

== Geography ==
The inlet is about 45 km (28 mi) in length from its head at the community of Rivers Inlet, which was a logging and fishing town that is also the home of the Wuikinuxv and their government, the Wuikinuxv Nation, also known variously as the Owekeeno, Awikenox, Oowekeeno and also as the Rivers Inlet people. The main rivers feeding Rivers Inlet are the Kilbella River and its tributary, the Chuckwalla River, and the 3 km (1.9 mi) Wannock River, which feeds the head of Rivers Inlet and was fed by the fresh-water fjord Owikeno Lake, 50 km (31 mi) in length, and which is fed by the Tzeo, Sheemahant and Machmell Rivers. The Machmell, the largest, is fed from the northern flank of the Ha-Iltzuk Icefield, one of the largest of the southern Coast Mountains icecaps, and which was capped by the Silverthrone Caldera.

About 15 km (9.3 mi) down the inlet, west from the town and the head of the inlet, is the mouth of a 30 km (19 mi) side-inlet from the north, Moses Inlet, which is fed by the Clyak River and which itself has a western side-inlet named Hardy Inlet, 15 km (9.3 mi) in length.
