= Latin lambda =

Additional letter of the Latin alphabet

Lambda
- Ꟛ ꟛ

Usage
- Writing system: Latin script
- Type: alphabetic
- Sound values: /ʎ/; /tɬ/; /dɮ/; /dl/

History
- Development: Λ λ: Ꟛ ꟛ
- Sisters: Ƛ ƛ

Lambda (Ꟛ, ꟛ) is an additional letter of the Latin script, based on the lowercase letter lambda from the Greek alphabet (λ). It is used in Heiltsuk, Liqʼwala, Kwakʼwala, and Pilagá. In these languages, Latin lambda represents a variety of lateral phonemes. The lower-case variant is a homoglyph of lower-case lambda. The upper-case is a large variant of the lower case in Pilagá but a turned Y in North America.

== Usage ==
The letter appears in the Liqʼwala dialect of Kwakʼwala language, where it represents /tɬ/. In Kwakʼwala, Latin lambda may also be used instead of the digraph ⟨dƚ⟩.

In the Heiltsuk dialect of North Wakashan, Latin lambda represents /tɬ/ and may be alternatively rendered as ⟨dh⟩.

In the Pilagá language, Latin lambda is used to represent /ʎ/.

Unicode support was assigned to U+A7DA and U+A7DB in September 2024.

== Encodings ==
Character information
Preview	Ꟛ		ꟛ	
Unicode name	LATIN CAPITAL LETTER LAMBDA		LATIN SMALL LETTER LAMBDA	
Encodings	decimal	hex	dec	hex
Unicode	42970	U+A7DA	42971	U+A7DB
UTF-8	234 159 154	EA 9F 9A	234 159 155	EA 9F 9B
Numeric character reference	&#42970;	&#xA7DA;	&#42971;	&#xA7DB;

== Gallery ==
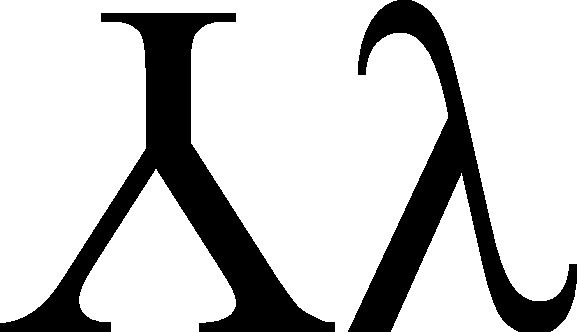
An example for the Lambda (Latin) letter by the Times New Roman. (not real)
