= Reversed glottal stop =

Letter of the Latin alphabet

- ʕ ꟎ ꟏ ˁ ˤ

Usage
- Writing system: Latin script
- Type: Alphabetic
- Language of origin: casing pair: Pilagá
- Sound values: [ʕ]
- In Unicode: U+0295, U+A7CE, U+A7CF, U+02C1, U+02E4

History
- Development: ◌̓: ʔ; ʕ ꟎ ꟏ ˁ ˤ
- Time period: caseless: 1928-present casing pair: 1996-present
- Descendants: ʢ
- Sisters: ʔ Ɂ ɂ ˀ

Other
- Associated graphs: ʽ ʿ ʻ
- Writing direction: Left-to-right

The reversed glottal stop ⟨ʕ⟩ (majuscule: ꟎, minuscule: ꟏, superscript: ˤ) is a letter of the Latin script. It is usually used to denote a voiced pharyngeal fricative or approximant, either as a caseless letter as in the International Phonetic Alphabet, or as a cased pair in the Pilagá alphabet. Like the glottal stop ⟨ʔ⟩, which is derived historically from an apostrophe, it derives from the reversed comma ⟨ʽ⟩, as does the half ring ⟨ʿ⟩.

== Graphic variants ==
In Unicode, five graphic variants of the reversed glottal stop are available.

- Caseless U+0295 ʕ LATIN LETTER PHARYNGEAL VOICED FRICATIVE, used in phonetic transcriptions and some orthographies.
- Casing pair U+A7CE ꟎ LATIN CAPITAL LETTER PHARYNGEAL VOICED FRICATIVE and U+A7CF ꟏ LATIN SMALL LETTER PHARYNGEAL VOICED FRICATIVE, used in Pilagá orthography.
- Superscript U+02C1 ˁ MODIFIER LETTER REVERSED GLOTTAL STOP, graphical alternative of ⟨ʿ⟩.
- Superscript U+02E4 ˤ MODIFIER LETTER SMALL REVERSED GLOTTAL STOP, technical superscript of caseless ⟨ʕ⟩.

Additionally, there are two graphic variants with a stroke, both used in phonetic transcriptions.

- Caseless U+02A2 ʢ LATIN LETTER REVERSED GLOTTAL STOP WITH STROKE
- Superscript U+107B4 𐞴 MODIFIER LETTER REVERSED GLOTTAL STOP WITH STROKE

== Usage ==
The phonetic symbol ʕ became part of the International Phonetic Alphabet in 1928, replacing the small capital Q ⟨ꞯ⟩ used in the 1912 Principles, to transcribe the voiced pharyngeal fricative. Like the glottal stop letter, it has since been borrowed into Americanist phonetic notation and the transliteration of languages such as Arabic (see Romanization of Arabic).

The reversed glottal stop is used as a caseless letter in several orthographies: Okanagan and Columbia-Moses in the United States, Ditinaht, Nuuchahnulth, St'at'imcets and Thompson in Canada. In Ethiopia, it is used by some authors in Tsamai while others use ⟨/⟩, and was used in Ale but has been replaced by ⟨q⟩.

The bicameral form of the letter (majuscule: ꟎, minuscule: ꟏) is used in the Pilagá language to represent the voiced pharyngeal fricative [ʕ]. It was created in 1996 after much deliberation throughout the Pilagá community, along with the rest of the Pilagá alphabet. In Pilagá, it is rendered similarly to the gelded reversed question mark.

== Appearance in computer fonts ==
The caseless U+0295 ʕ LATIN LETTER PHARYNGEAL VOICED FRICATIVE has been in Unicode since version 1.1 and has been available in previous phonetic encodings as well.

The casing pair ꟎ and ꟏ were added to Unicode in Latin Extended-D on September 9th, 2025, with the release of Unicode 17.0.0. Due to its infrequent usage and recent introduction into Unicode, few fonts have created a glyph for it (such as GNU Unifont, Iosevka or Catrinity), and the character may appear rendered as a box to many users. ꟎ and ꟏ occupy codepoints U+A7CE ꟎ LATIN CAPITAL LETTER PHARYNGEAL VOICED FRICATIVE and U+A7CF ꟏ LATIN SMALL LETTER PHARYNGEAL VOICED FRICATIVE respectively.

== Computing codes ==
Character information: Preview / ʕ / / ꟎ / / ꟏; Unicode name / LATIN LETTER PHARYNGEAL VOICED FRICATIVE / / LATIN CAPITAL LETTER PHARYNGEAL VOICED FRICATIVE / / LATIN SMALL LETTER PHARYNGEAL VOICED FRICATIVE; Encodings / decimal / hex / dec / hex / dec / hex; Unicode / 661 / U+0295 / 42958 / U+A7CE / 42959 / U+A7CF; UTF-8 / 202 149 / CA 95 / 234 159 142 / EA 9F 8E / 234 159 143 / EA 9F 8F; Numeric character reference / &#661; / &#x295; / &#42958; / &#xA7CE; / &#42959; / &#xA7CF;

== See also ==
- Glottal stop (letter)
- Pharyngealization
- Voiced pharyngeal fricative
