= Liqʼwala =

Kwakʼwala dialect of British Columbia, Canada

- Liq̓ʷala
- Native to: Canada
- Region: British Columbia
- Ethnicity: Laich-kwil-tach
- Native speakers: 12 (2017)
- Language family: Wakashan: Northern; Kwakʼwala; Liqʼwala

Language codes
- ISO 639-3: –
- Glottolog: None
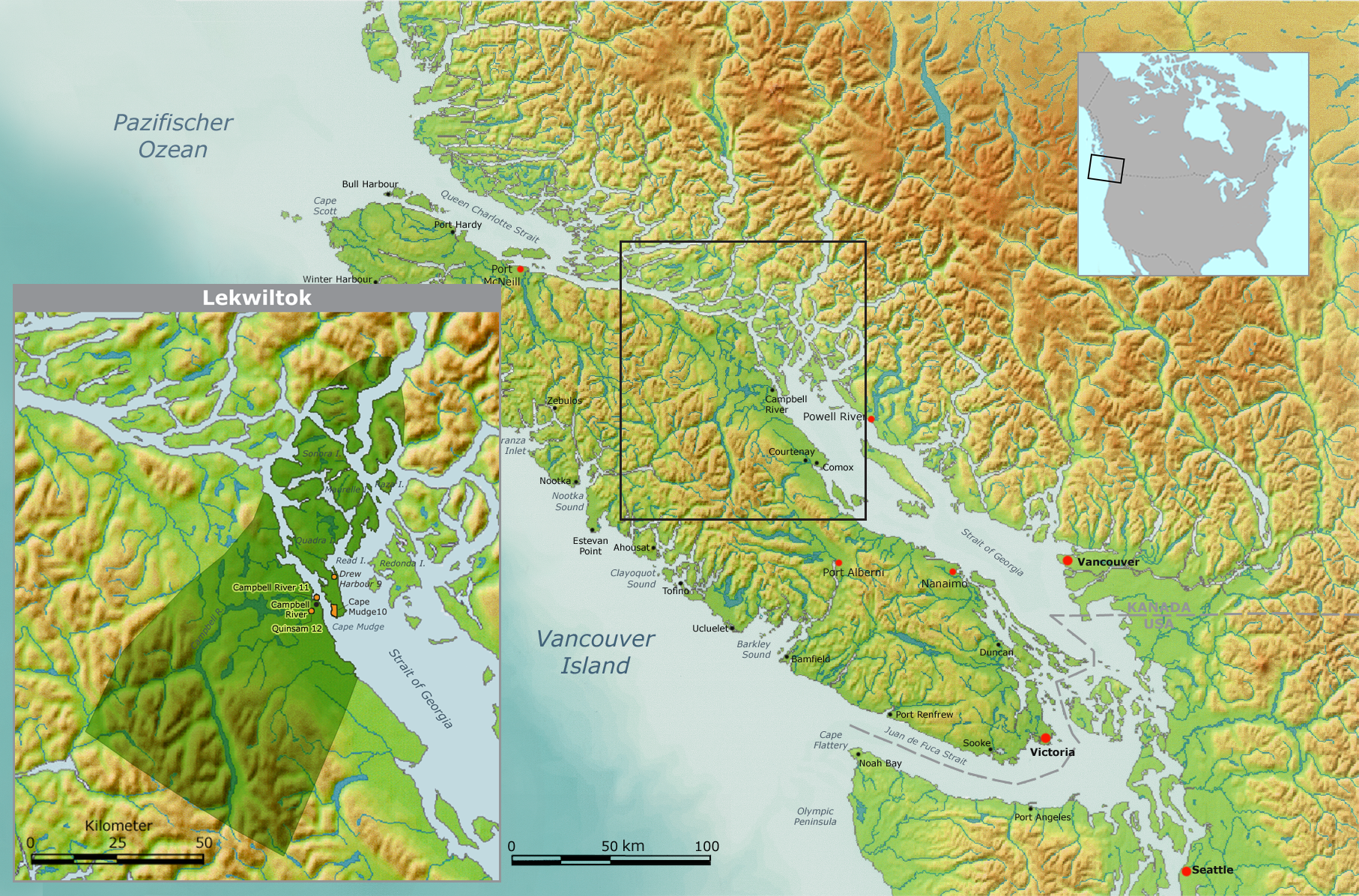
- Laich-kwil-tach territory

Liqʼwala (also rendered Liq̓ʷala and Likʼwala) is an endangered dialect of Kwakʼwala spoken by the Laich-kwil-tach people of Vancouver Island, British Columbia.

== Revitalization efforts ==
In 2017, according to Laurie Lewis of the Liqʼwala Language Revitalization Committee, only 12 individuals, all over 70, were fluent Liqʼwala speakers. The Campbell River Mirror reported in 2017 that an attempt would be made to teach the dialect through a Liqʼwala language immersion pilot program:

Lewis says they already have a mentor-apprentice program where a fluent elder works one-on-one with a qualified teacher for 300 hours, and between that elder and teacher, she is confident they could create a three-year pilot program that would provide a full immersion program. "We just want three years to make some fluent speakers so we can save our language," Lewis says, "and I want to have the conversation about how we can do that. We believe we can do it."

In January 2019, School District 72 Campbell River passed a motion to pilot a Liqʼwala immersion program at Ripple Rock Elementary in Campbell River, British Columbia.

== Phonology ==
Consonants
		Labial	Alveolar			Palatal	Velar		Uvular		Glottal
		Labial	plain	sibilant	lateral	Palatal	plain	lab.	plain	lab.	Glottal
Plosive/ Affricate	voiceless	p	t	ts	tɬ	c	k	kʷ	q	qʷ	ʔ
Plosive/ Affricate	voiced	b	d	dz	dɮ		ɡ	ɡʷ	ɢ	ɢʷ	ʔ
Plosive/ Affricate	ejective	pʼ	tʼ	tsʼ	tɬʼ	cʼ	kʼ	kʷʼ	qʼ	qʷʼ	ʔ
Fricative				s	ɬ		x	xʷ	χ	χʷ	h
Sonorant	plain	m	n		l	j		w			
Sonorant	glottalized	mˀ	nˀ		lˀ	jˀ		wˀ			

Vowels
	Front	Central	Back
High	i		u
Mid	e	ə	o
Low		a	

== Orthography ==
Liqʼwala follows an orthography based on Americanist phonetic notation and thus varies significantly from the orthography employed by other dialects of Kwakʼwala.

Liqʼwala alphabet
Uppercase	A	Ə	B	C	C̓	D	Dᶻ	E	G	Gʷ	Ǧ	Ǧʷ	H	I	K	K̓
Lowercase	a	ə	b	c	c̓	d	dᶻ	e	g	gʷ	ǧ	ǧʷ	h	i	k	k̓
Uppercase	Kʷ	K̓ʷ	L	L̓	Ł	Lambda latin	ƛ	ƛ̓	M	M̓	N	N̓	O	P	P̓	Q
Lowercase	kʷ	k̓ʷ	l	l̓	ł	λ	ƛ	ƛ̓	m	m̓	n	n̓	o	p	p̓	q
Uppercase	Qʷ	Q̓	Q̓ʷ	S	T	T̓	U	W	W̓	X	Xʷ	X̌	X̌ʷ	Y	Y̓	
Lowercase	qʷ	q̓	q̓ʷ	s	t	t̓	u	w	w̓	x	xʷ	x̌	x̌ʷ	y	y̓	ʔ
