= Likwala =

Likwala may refer to:

- Kwala language a Bantu language of the Republic of the Congo
- Liq’wala a dialect of the Kwakʼwala language spoken in British Columbia, Canada
