= Ditidaht language =

Wakashan language

Ditidaht
- Nitinaht
- diitiid7aa7tx, diitiidʔaaʔtx̣
- Native to: Canada
- Region: Southern part of Vancouver Island, British Columbia
- Ethnicity: 940 Ditidaht (2014, FPCC); formerly also the Pacheedaht
- Native speakers: 7 (2014, FPCC)
- Language family: Wakashan: Southern; Ditidaht

Language codes
- ISO 639-3: dtd
- Glottolog: diti1235
- ELP: Diitiidʔaatx̣ (Nitinat)
- Map of Wakashan languages

Ditidaht [dee-tee-dot] (also Nitinaht, Nitinat, Southern Nootkan) or diitiidʔaaʔtx̣ is a South Wakashan (Nootkan) language spoken on the southern part of Vancouver Island. Nitinaht is related to the other South Wakashan languages, Makah and the neighboring Nuu-chah-nulth.

== Status and history ==
The number of native Ditidaht speakers dwindled from about thirty in the 1990s to just eight by 2006. In 2003 the Ditidaht council approved construction of a $4.2 million community school to teach students on the Ditidaht (Malachan) reserve their language and culture from kindergarten to Grade 12. The program was successful in its first years and produced its first high-school graduate in 2005. In 2014, the number of fluent Ditidaht speakers was 7, the number of individuals who have a good grasp on the language 6, and there were 55 people learning the language.

Ditidaht has been the subject of considerable linguistic research including the publication of texts and, in 1981, an introductory university-level textbook.

== Names ==
The reason for the unusual discrepancy in the names Nitinaht and Ditidaht is that when the Ditidaht people were first contacted by Europeans, they had nasal consonants (/m/, /n/) in their language. Their autonym of Nitinaht was what the Europeans recorded for them and their language. Soon afterward the consonants shifted to voiced plosives (/b/, /d/) as part of an areal trend, so the people came to call themselves Ditidaht. Ditidaht is thus one of only a handful of languages in the world that do not have nasal consonants.

== Phonology ==
=== Consonants ===
		Bilabial	Alveolar			Palatal	Velar		Uvular		Pharyngeal	Glottal
		Bilabial	plain	sibilant	lateral	Palatal	plain	lab.	plain	lab.	Pharyngeal	Glottal
Plosive/ Affricate	voiceless	p	t	ts	tɬ	tʃ	k	kʷ	q	qʷ		ʔ
Plosive/ Affricate	ejective	pʼ	tʼ	tsʼ	tɬʼ	tʃʼ	kʼ	kʼʷ	qʼ	qʼʷ		ʔ
Plosive/ Affricate	voiced	b	d									
Plosive/ Affricate	glottalized	ˀb	ˀd									
Fricative				s	ɬ	ʃ	x	xʷ	χ	χʷ	ʕ	h
Sonorant	voiced	m	n		l	j		w				
Sonorant	glottalized	ˀm	ˀn		ˀl	ˀj		ˀw				

=== Vowels ===
Vowels are phonemically transcribed as /i e a o u/ and /iː eː aː oː uː/. They are noted phonetically as:

Phoneme	Sound	Phoneme	Sound
/i/	[ɪ] ~ [i]	/iː/	[iː]
/e/	[ɛ] ~ [æ]	/eː/	[æː]
/a/	[ʌ] ~ [ɑ]	/aː/	[ɑː]
/o/	[o]	/oː/	[oː] ~ [ɔː]
/u/	[ʊ] ~ [u]	/uː/	[u]

== See also ==
- Ditidaht First Nation
