= Kwakʼwala =

Wakashan language of British Columbia, Canada

- Kwakiutl
- Kwak̓wala
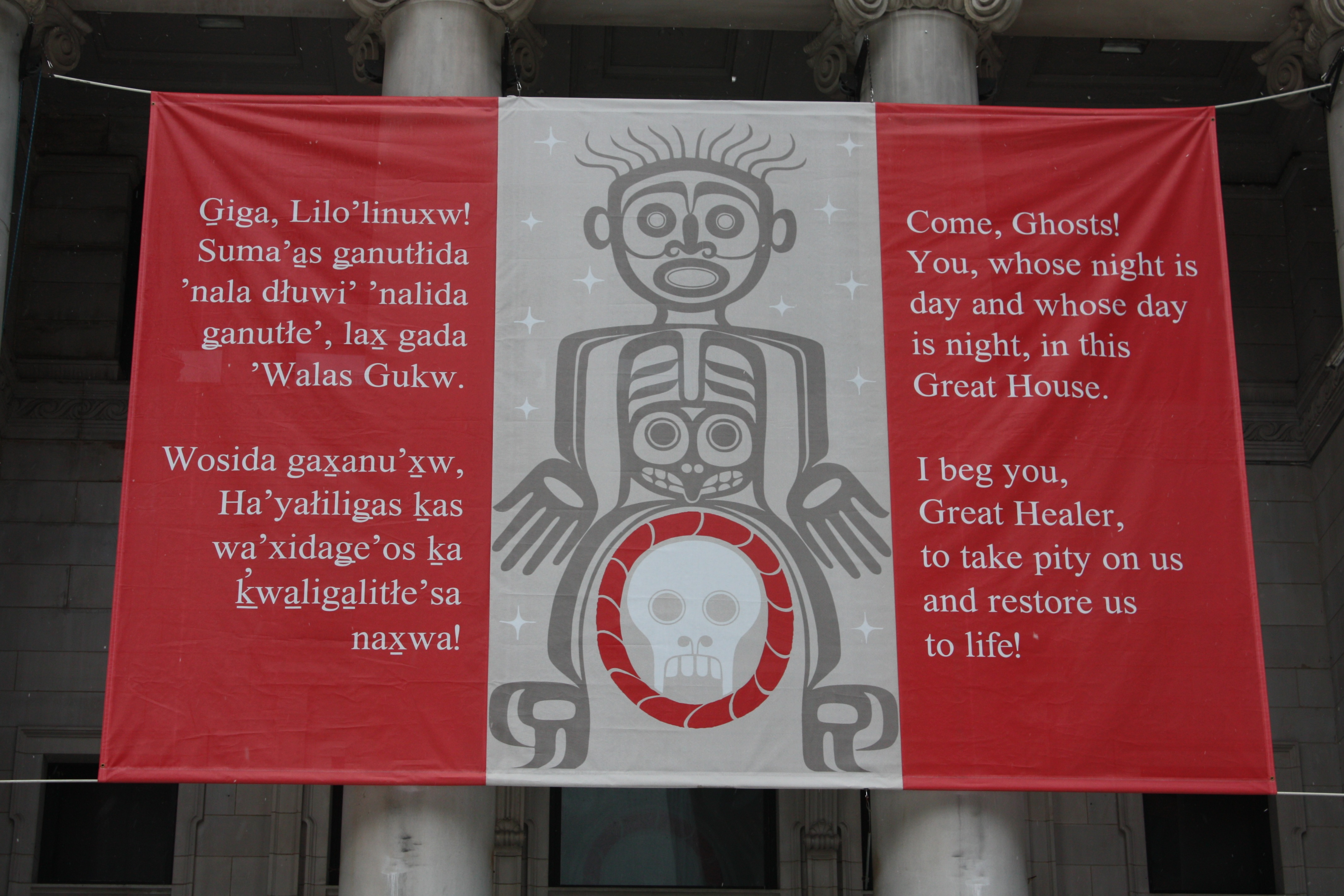
- Marianne Nicolson's The House of the Ghosts, 2008. Text in Kwakʼwala and English at the Vancouver Art Gallery
- Native to: Canada
- Region: along the Queen Charlotte Strait
- Ethnicity: 3,665 Kwakwakaʼwakw
- Native speakers: 255 (2021 census)
- Language family: Wakashan: Northern; Kwakʼwala
- Dialects: T̓łat̓łasik̓wala; G̱uc̓ala; Nak̕wala; Liq̓ʷala

Language codes
- ISO 639-3: kwk
- Glottolog: kwak1269
- ELP: Kwak̓wala
- Dialects of Kwakʼwala

- Kwakʼwala is classified as Critically Endangered by the UNESCO Atlas of the World's Languages in Danger.

- People: Kwakwa̱ka̱ʼwakw
- Language: Kwak̓wala; Kwak̓wala ʼNak̓wala; G̱uc̓ala; T̓łat̓łasik̓wala; Liqʼwala
- Country: Kwakwa̱ka̱ʼwakw A̱wi'nagwis

Kwakʼwala or Kwak̓wala (/kwɑːˈkwɑːlə/), previously known as Kwakiutl (/ˈkwɑːkjʊtəl/), is a Wakashan language spoken by about 150 Kwakwakaʼwakw people around Queen Charlotte Strait on the coast of British Columbia. It has shared considerable influence with other languages of the Pacific Northwest, especially those of the unrelated Salishan family. While Kwakʼwala is classified as critically endangered according to UNESCO, revitalization efforts are underway to preserve the language.

While Kwakʼwala had no written records until European contact, archeological and linguistic evidence shed light on its prehistory. Northern and Southern branches of the Wakashan language family split approximately 2,900 years ago. Northern Wakashan (or Kwakiutlan) speakers likely expanded outward from the north of Vancouver Island, displacing Salishan languages on the mainland of what is now British Columbia. Kwakʼwala was first written by missionaries during the colonization of the Pacific Northwest. As part of its policy of forced cultural assimilation of indigenous peoples, the Canadian government suppressed Kwakʼwala and outlawed its attendant culture through the late 19th to mid-20th centuries; as of the early 21st century, elders and second-language learners are currently rebuilding its speaking population.

Kwakʼwala has complex word formation, featuring a polysynthetic morphology that is almost exclusively suffixing like other Wakashan languages. Its verbs feature suffixes for mood, aspect, and person, with multiple of these meanings often existing in a single suffix. Kwakʼwala's nouns feature case suffixes marking the subject, object, and instrument within a phrase, as well as spatial relationships including distance from and visibility to the speaker. These suffixes can trigger consonant mutation in the stem which they inflect. It is also phonologically complex; its rich consonant inventory contains phonemes that are cross-linguistically uncommon. As a part of the Pacific Northwest sprachbund, Kwakʼwala shares many typological features in common with indigenous languages of that region.

== History ==
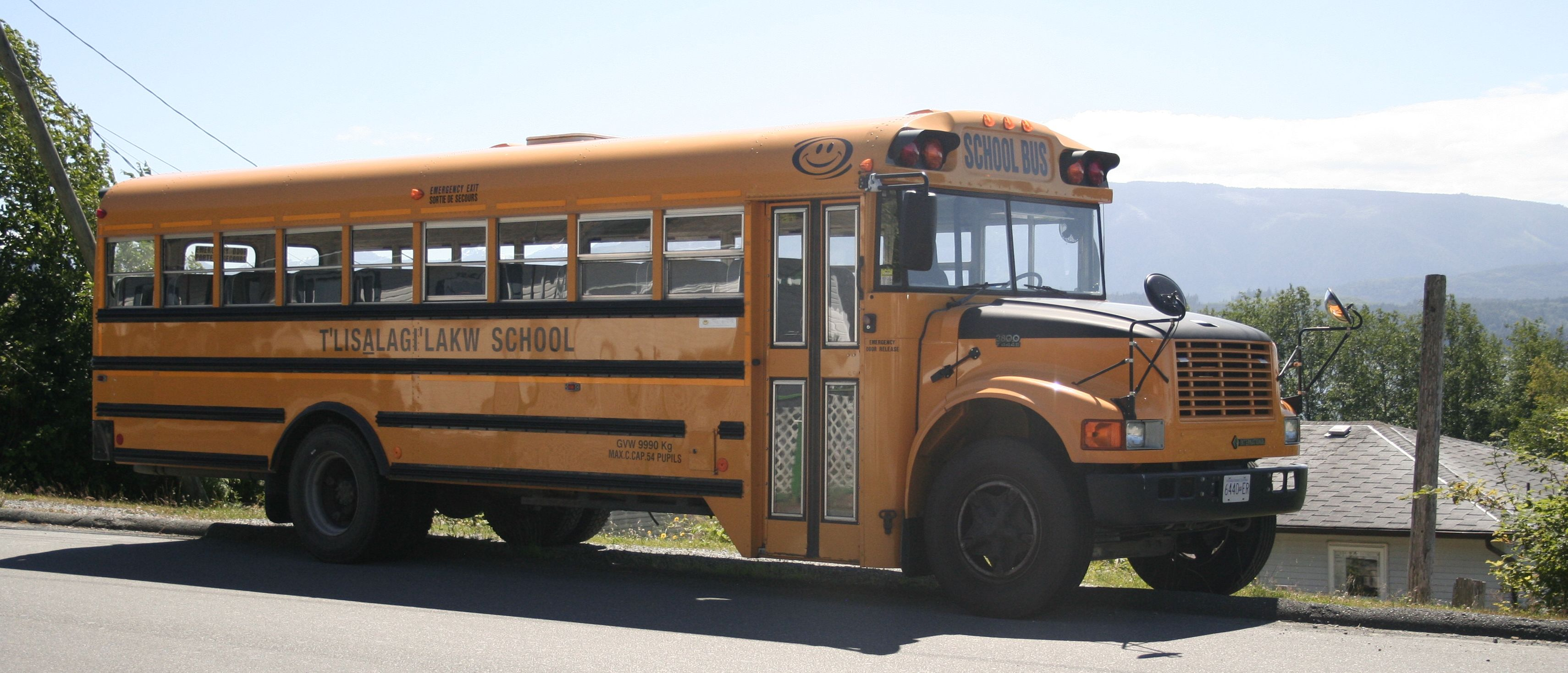
The Tʼlisalagiʼlakw School near Alert Bay has made efforts to restore Kwakʼwala.

The use of Kwakʼwala declined significantly in the nineteenth and twentieth centuries, mainly due to the assimilationist policies of the Canadian government, and above all the mandatory attendance of Kwakwaʼwakw children at residential schools in the Indian Act, 1920 s.10(1). Although Kwakʼwala and Kwakwakaʼwakw culture have been well-studied by linguists and anthropologists, the efforts did not reverse the trends leading to language loss. According to Guy Buchholtzer, "The anthropological discourse had too often become a long monologue, in which the Kwakwakaʼwakw had nothing to say." As a result of these pressures, there are relatively few Kwakʼwala speakers today, and most remaining speakers are past the age of child-raising, which is considered crucial for language transmission. As with many other indigenous languages, there are significant barriers to language revitalization.

However, a number of revitalization efforts have recently attempted to reverse language loss for Kwakʼwala. A proposal to build a Kwakwakaʼwakw First Nations Centre for Language Culture has gained wide support. In August 2021 a Culture Camp for youth was launched in Bond Sound called Nawalakw or "Supernatural" in Kwakʼwala. The project's goal is to revitalize the language, and to be a place where Kwak̓wala is spoken fluently by community members of all ages. A review of revitalization efforts in the 1990s shows that the potential to fully revitalize Kwakʼwala still remains, but serious hurdles also exist. The language is taught at The Uʼmista Cultural Center in Alert Bay, British Columbia. In 2012, the Nuyumbalees Cultural Centre on Quadra Island received funding for shelving to display its collection of First Nations books for the benefit of Kwakʼwala speakers.

A Kwakʼwala iPhone app was released in December 2011. An online dictionary, phrasebook, and language learning portal is available at the First Voices Kwakʼwala Community Portal. The Kwakwala Bible Portions were put online by the Canadian Bible Society in 2020.

With funding from the nonprofit Mitacs, researchers Sara Child and Caroline Running Wolf have combined technology and indigenous pedagogy to provide multiple resources for learning Kwakʼwala. As of 2022, they seek to use virtual or augmented reality along with text-to-speech software to create an immersive learning experience for Kwakʼwala learners.

== Dialects ==
The Kwakwakaʼwakw (meaning "speakers of Kwakʼwala") are an ethnic group comprising multiple tribes sharing the Kwakʼwala language. However, the Kwakʼwala spoken by each tribe exhibits often significant dialectal differences. There are four major unambiguous dialects of Kwakʼwala: Kwak̓wala, ʼNak̓wala, G̱uc̓ala and T̓łat̓łasik̓wala.

=== Liqʼwala ===
In addition to those dialects, there are also Kwakwakaʼwakw tribes that speak Liqʼwala. Liqʼwala has sometimes been considered to be a dialect of Kwakʼwala and sometimes a separate language. The standard orthography for Liqʼwala is quite different from the most widely used orthography for Kwakʼwala.

== Phonology ==
Kwakʼwala phonology exhibits many traits of the Northwest Coast Sprachbund of which it is a part. They include a large phonemic inventory with a very rich array of consonantal contrasts and relatively few vowel phonemes, frequent use of a reduced vowel /ə/, contrastively glottalized sonorant consonants, the existence of ejectives at all places of articulation, and the presence of lateral affricates.

=== Consonants ===
The consonantal inventory of Kwakʼwala includes a three-way contrast in plosives (voiceless, voiced, and ejective). There is an extensive series of distinctions between rounded and non-rounded consonants in the dorsal region. Notably, there are no velar consonants without secondary articulation: they are all either palatalized or labialized. This is an areal feature characteristic of many Indigenous Pacific Northwest languages. The consonants are shown in the following table.

		Bilabial	Alveolar			Palatal	Velar	Uvular		Glottal
		Bilabial	plain	sib.	lat.	Palatal	Velar	plain	lab.	Glottal
Plosive/ Affricate	voiceless	p	t	ts	tɬ	c	kʷ	q	qʷ	ʔ
Plosive/ Affricate	voiced	b	d	dz	dɮ	ɟ	ɡʷ	ɢ	ɢʷ	
Plosive/ Affricate	ejective	pʼ	tʼ	tsʼ	tɬʼ	cʼ	kʷʼ	qʼ	qʷʼ	
Fricative				s	ɬ	ç	xʷ	χ	χʷ	h
Sonorant	plain	m	n		l	j	w			
Sonorant	glottalized	mˀ	nˀ		lˀ	jˀ	wˀ			

=== Vowels ===
	Front	Central	Back
Close	i		u
Mid	e	ə	o
Open		a	

The vowels of Kwakʼwala are /a e i o u ə/. There is a phonemic length distinction as well; however, not all vowels exist in both long and short versions. The phonemic status of some of the vowels in question is relatively unclear, as especially evident in the case of /a/ and /ə/. They often interchange in different instances of the same stem or suffix, depending on the phonological content.

Grubb (1969) presents some cases of complementary distribution between /a/ and /ə/ but concludes that those vowels must be underlyingly distinct in some other cases. Bach (1975) analyzes that only the vowels /ə/ and /a/ are phonemic, with the remaining ones being allophonic: /i/ from /əj/; /u/ from /əw/; /e/ from /əja/; and /o/ from /əwa/.

=== Suprasegmentals ===
Stress placement depends on syllable weight. A syllable is heavy if it has a long vowel or a moraic coda; otherwise it is light. A moraic coda is a non-glottalized sonorant. Thus, /pən/ counts as a heavy syllable, while /pət/ is light (Zec 1994). If a word has any heavy syllables, primary stress falls on the leftmost heavy syllable. Otherwise, primary stress falls on the rightmost syllable.

Secondary stress also occurs, but its distribution is less well understood. According to Wilson (1986), secondary stress falls on the second syllable following the primary stress and iteratively thereafter on every second syllable. This statement may be amended to take into account the observation of Boas (1947) that epenthetic vowels never bear stress, including secondary stress, and they seem to be invisible when syllables are counted for the assignment of secondary stress.

Kwakʼwala appears to have an otherwise unattested pattern of repair strategies for coda condition violations. Underlyingly voiced consonants are devoiced word-finally but surface faithfully with following epenthesis when they are word-internal. Glottalized consonants remain glottalized when word-final but surface with a following epenthetic vowel when they are word-internal (Davenport 2007).

=== Morphophonology ===
Kwakʼwala has a rich morphological system which, like other Wakashan languages, is entirely suffixing (except for reduplication). Like its sister languages, Kwakʼwala morphology is notable for the complex effects that certain suffixes trigger or correlate with in the stems to which they affix. There are two basic categories of changes associated with suffixes: fortition, or lenition, of a stem-final consonant, and expansion of stem material through vowel lengthening or reduplication.

==== Hardening and weakening ====
Suffixes fall into three classes according to their behaviour: weakening, hardening, and neutral. Weakening and hardening suffixes alter the stem to which they attach by changing the features of the stem-final consonant. Following the Boasian orthographic tradition, the suffix types are indicated by a symbol preceding the suffix: ⟨-⟩, ⟨=⟩ or ⟨-!⟩, respectively.

Weakening suffixes trigger lenition in some cases. Plain voiceless stops and affricates are changed to their voiced equivalent. The behaviour of fricatives is somewhat less systematic. The sibilant /s/ alternates with [dz] or [j], depending on the root. The velar /xʲ/ alternates with [n]. Both /xʷ/ and /χʷ/ alternate with [w], but /χ/ does not change in a weakening context. The lateral /ɬ/ alternates with both [ɮ] and [l]. Sonorants weaken by becoming glottalized.

In addition to the somewhat unpredictable set of changes, the patterns involved in weakening are further complicated by the fact that some suffixes weaken stops but do not affect fricatives. Boas lists 11 suffixes weakening stops and affricates but not fricatives; these suffixes are indicated by the notation ⟨=⟩ as seen in the following list: /=əs/ "continuously"; /=əχsta/ "mouth, opening, to talk about"; /=əxʲsa/ "away"; /=təwiʔ/ or /=toʔji/ "to do something while doing something else" – weakens /s/; (=)ɡʲəɬ "continuing motion in a definite direction" – weakens /k, q, s/; (=)ɡʲətɬəla "to go attend, to be on the way"; /=χəkʷ/ "place where there are many (plants etc.)" – does not weaken /s/; /=χs/ "canoe"; /=χsikʲa/ "in front of house, body, mountain"; /=χtɬəjˀa/ "by force"; /=tɬiʔ/ "moving on water".

Hardening suffixes trigger fortition in most cases. Stem-final plain stops or affricates or sonorants become glottalized. As with weakening suffixes, the hardening patterns of fricatives are less predictable. /s/ hardens to [ts] or [jˀ]. (The classification is apparently arbitrary and not necessarily consistent with the weakening behavior of a given stem; a stem in which /s/ becomes [dz] when weakened may become either [ts] or [jˀ] when it is hardened, etc.) /xʲ/ hardens to [nˀ]. Both /xʷ/ and /χʷ/ harden to [wˀ], while /χ/ in a hardening context surfaces with an additional following glottal stop: [χʔ]. /ɬ/ hardens to [lˀ].

The table below illustrates how various roots weaken and harden.

Root	Weakening	Hardening	Meaning
ʔiːp	ʔiːbaju	ʔiːpʼid	'pinch'
wat	waːdəkʷ	watʼiːniʔ	
ɢəkʲ	ɢəɡʲad	ɢaːɢəkʼʲa	
bəkʷ	bəɡʷiːs	bəkʼʷəs	'man'
wənq	wənɢiɬ	wənqʼa	
jaqʷ	jaːɢʷis	jaːqʼʷəs	
kʼʲəmtɬ	kʼʲəmdləkʷ	kʼʲəmtɬʼala	
pʼəs	pʼəjaːju	pʼaːpʼətsʼa	
məxʲ	mənatsʼi	maːmanˀa	battle
dlaχʷ	dlaːwaju	dlaːwˀa	
tsʼuːɬ	tsʼuːlatu	tsʼulˀəmja	
siːχʷ	siːwaju	siːwˀala	paddle

==== Stem expansion ====
In addition to fortition and lengthening, suffixes may also be associated with lengthening or reduplication effects on the stems which precede them. (Boas 1947) distinguishes seven classes of suffix (with many subclasses), which all have different effects on some of the twenty possible root shapes which he identifies:

	Root										Suffix									
Class	Shape	e.g.	1	1a	2	3a	3b	3c	3d	3e	3f	3g	3h	4	5	6a	6b	6c	6d	7
A1.	CəT	nəp	=	=	–	– or V+=	–	–	ˈa or +ə	ˈa	–	– or ˘+=	ˈa or CVC*a	˘+=	aː+a	–	–	ˈa	–	eː+v
A2.	CəR	kən	=	–	–	–	–	-+=	= or ˘+=	˘+=	– or ˘+=		˘+=	˘+=	aː+=	-+˘ or –	-+˘	-+˘	-+˘	-+˘
A3.	CəY	dəy	=	–	–	–	– or V+=	˘+= or -"	– or ˘+=	˘+=	˘+=	-" or ˘+=	˘+=			-+˘	-+˘	-+˘	-+˘	-+˘
A4.	CəD	wˀəd	=	=	–	–	–	–	ˈ-	–	–	–	–			–	= (?)	–		eː+˘
A5.	CəTʼ	χəkʲʼ	=	=	–	–	–	–	ˈ-	–	–		=	˘+=	aː+=	–	–			eː+˘
A6.	CəRˀ	tsʼəmˀ	=	=	–	–		=	ˈ-	ˈ-					˘+=	˘+=	˘+=	–	–	eː+˘
B1.	CVT	ɡʲuːkʷ	=	=	=	– or -+˘	-" or ˘+=	˘+= or -" or CajaC	-" or ˘+=	-" or ˘+=	-" or ˘+=	-" or -+=	˘+=	˘+=	aː+=	-+˘ or -+aː	-+v	– or -+a	-+a	-+˘
B2.	CVR	qʼuːm	=	=	=						˘+=					˘+- or əm	-+˘			
B3.	CVY	–	=	=	=				-" or ˘+=							˘+-				
B4.	CVD	jˀuːɡʷ	=	=	=			˘+= or ˈ-			-" or ˘+=	˘+=								
B5.	CVTʼ	siːqʼ	=	=	=	=		˘+=(a)	– or ˘+=		˘+=	v+=				˘+-	-+˘	– or ˘+-		
B6.	CVRˀ	waːnˀ	=	=	=	=		˘+=			˘+=					–				
C1.	CVRT	qəns	=	=	=	– or -+˘ or CaRaC	– or ˘+= or CaRaC	˘+= or CaRaC	– or ˘+=	˘+= or CaRaC	˘+= or –	– or ˘+=	˘+=	˘+=	aː+=	-+˘	-+=	-+=˘	-+˘	-+=
C2.	–	–																		
C3.	–	–																		
C4.	CəRD	məndz	=	=				v+=	– or ˘+=			v+=						˘+-		
C5.	CəRTʼ	jəŋkʲʼ	=	=		=		˘+=	– or ˘+=	˘+=		v+=						˘+-		
C6.	CəRˀT	ɡʲəmˀxʲ	=	=		=		–												
D.	CəTT	tsʼəɬkʲ	=	=				˘+=	-" or ˘+=	˘+=	˘+=	˘+=			aː+?	aː+˘				-+˘

Key: The chart follows the one given in (Boas 1947, p. 235), with a few alterations. Root shapes refer to an initial consonant C, a nucleus ə or a full vowel V, and final consonants including plain voiceless obstruents (T), voiced obstruents (D), glides (Y), other sonorants (R) and glottalized versions of each of T and R (Tʼ and Rˀ). Cells show the effect of suffixes belonging to the various classes (columns) on roots or stems of various shapes (rows). = indicates that the suffix leaves the stem unchanged. – indicates that the suffix triggers vowel lengthening in the stem (often causing ə to turn into aː). A cell with a vowel (a or e) indicates that the stem vowel is replaced with the vowel in the cell. Several symbols occurring together with + in the middle indicates that reduplication occurs; the symbols on each side of + indicate the shape of each syllable of the reduplicative stem.

For example, class 7 suffixes added to C1 roots trigger reduplication on the pattern -+= which means that the reduplicative stem has two syllables, with the first syllable long and the second syllable preserving the length of the original stem. ˘ indicates a short copy; thus a 6a suffix on a D root will produce a reduplicative stem, with the second syllable being short and the first syllable having a nucleus a. C refers to one of the stem consonants. Stress marks show the location of primary stress in the suffixed form. In non-reduplicative forms, they indicate that the stem itself bears stress. In reduplicative forms, stress marks indicate which stem syllable bears stress. When no stress mark is included, stress assignment follows the regular pattern for Kwakʼwala stress. Cells with multiple options are given as in the original chart; it is not clear whether the optionality is systematic in any way.

A few symbols whose meaning is unclear have been retained directly, as given in Boas. These include V and v. The symbol -" corresponds to a special symbol in the original chart (a dash with trema); its meaning is also unclear. A few corrections to the original chart are made in the version above. Class 2 suffixes are listed in this chart as "all -", i.e. lengthening all stems. However, all the class 2 suffixes described by Boas which productively apply to roots of type B or C leave stems unchanged rather than triggering lengthening. This also adheres to the phonotactics of Kwakʼwala, which do not allow super-heavy syllables of the type which would be created by lengthening these stems.

Therefore, the chart above treats class 2 suffixes as causing no change in roots of these types. Additionally, several forms in the original chart have "-" in place of "+" in reduplicative forms. They are taken as errors here, and corrected in the chart above. Root classes C2 and C3 are included in this chart as they are included in his chart even though there are no known roots belonging to these classes (which would presumably have the shapes CəRR and CəRY). Root class B3 is included with the changes noted in the original chart although (Boas 1947, p. 217) states that there are no known roots of this type.

An example of a suffix that triggers stem changes is -!əm "exclusively; real, really; just only; common," which belongs to class 3f. Its effect on roots of various shapes is shown in the following table.

Root class	Root	Suffixed form	Gloss
A1	məxʲ	maːnˀəm	"hit with fist and nothing else"
A2	kʲən	kʲəkʲənˀəmxʲʔid	"to get really loose"
A3	qʼəj	qʼaqʼajˀəm	"really many"
A4	wˀəd	wˀadaʔəm	"really cold"
A5	χəkʲʼ	χaːkʲʼaʔəm	"really to stay away"
A6	ɬəlˀ	ɬaːlaʔəm	"really dead"
B1	ɡʲuːkʷ	ɡʲəɡʲuːkʷʼəm	"a house and nothing else"
B2	ɡʲaːl	ɡʲəɡʲaːlaʔəm	"very first"
B4	juːɡʷ	jˀəjˀuːɡʷamˀ or jˀuːɡʷamˀ	"really rain"
B5	χanˀ	χəχaːnˀaʔəm	"really naked"
C1	ləmχʷ	lələmwˀəm	"really dry"
D	pʼədəkʲ	pʼaːdəkʲʼəmxʲʔid	"it gets really dark"

==== Other word-formation processes ====
In addition to suffix-driven reduplication, word formation may also involve reduplication not tied to any suffix. There are at least two reduplication patterns.

== Orthography ==
Word lists and some documentation of Kwakʼwala were created from the early period of contact with Europeans in the 18th century. The first systematic work to record the language was done by Rev Alfred James Hall (1853–1918) who was an English missionary with the Anglican Church Mission Society (CMS) North Pacific Mission in British Columbia. He arrived at Fort Rupert in 1881 and worked amongst the Kwakuitl people at Fort Rupert and Alert Bay. He learnt the Kwakʼwala language, and created an orthography for the language based upon the Latin alphabet used by English. He produced portions of the Book of Common Prayer in 1888 which was published by the Society for Promoting Christian Knowledge (SPCK). This was expanded in 1900. He produced a Grammar of the language in 1889. He translated some books of the New Testament which were published by the British and Foreign Bible Society in London. He produced the Gospel of Matthew in 1882, the Gospel of John in 1884, the Gospel of Mark in 1890, the Gospel of Luke in 1894 and then the Book of Acts in 1897.

Another attempt to record the language was made by Franz Boas in the late 19th and early 20th century. However, Boas was not solely responsible for the data collection of the Kwakʼwala language; George Hunt provided tens of thousands of pages of the language in which he worked with Boas to officially document. Through this data collection, Boas and Hunt developed a systematic orthography for documentation of Kwakʼwala, which captured almost all of the important distinctions in the language (although some features, such as vowel length and stress, were not recorded systematically).

Although the Boasian orthography was able to capture almost all of the important features of Kwakʼwala, it was difficult for Kwakʼwala speakers to use: it was impossible to write with a standard typewriter due to its abundant use of special symbols, and it used some standard letters very differently from English orthography, which was familiar to many Kwakwakaʼwakw. A practical orthography, developed by the Kwakwakaʼwakw linguist David Grubb, became the standard system for writing Kwakʼwala.

Practical writing of Kwakʼwala today is typically done in the orthography promoted by the Uʼmista Cultural Society, which largely resembles the Grubb orthography. Variants of this orthography allow for easier computer typesetting. For example, instead of marking ejective consonants with an apostrophe printed above the consonant, the apostrophe may be printed as a separate character following the consonant. Linguistic works on Kwakʼwala typically use an IPA or Americanist transcription.

=== Uʼmista Cultural Society alphabet ===
Uʼmista alphabet
Uppercase	A	A̱	B	D	Dł	Dz	E	G	Gw	G̱	G̱w	H	I	K	Kw	K̓
Lowercase	a	a̱	b	d	dł	dz	e	g	gw	g̱	g̱w	h	i	k	kw	k̓
Sound	a	ə	b	d	d͡ɮ	d͡z	e	gʲ	gʷ	ɢ	ɢʷ	h	i	kʲ	kʷ	kʲ’
Uppercase	K̓w	Ḵ	Ḵw	Ḵ̓	Ḵ̓w	L	ʼL	Ł	M	ʼM	N	ʼN	O	P	P̓	S
Lowercase	k̓w	ḵ	ḵw	ḵ̓	ḵ̓w	l	ʼl	ł	m	ʼm	n	ʼn	o	p	p̓	s
Sound	kʷ’	q	qʷ	q’	qʷ’	l	lˀ	ɬ	m	mˀ	n	nˀ	o	p	p’	s
Uppercase	T	T̓	Tł	T̓ł	Ts	T̓s	U	W	ʼW	X	Xw	X̱	X̱w	Y	ʼY	ʼ
Lowercase	t	t̓	tł	t̓ł	ts	t̓s	u	w	ʼw	x	xw	x̱	x̱w	y	ʼy	ʼ
Sound	t	t’	t͡ɬ	t͡ɬ’	t͡s	t͡s’	u	w	wˀ	xʲ	xʷ	χ	χʷ	j	jˀ	ʔ

	"that will be"	"and so first I throw"	"six kinds"	"raven dancer"
IPA	hiʔəmt͡ɬi	ɡʲəɬmˀisən	qʼat͡ɬʼəxʲidaɬa	ɢʷəɢʷaːχʷəlaɬ
Boas	heʼᵋᴇmʟe	g̣ᴇłᵋmisᴇn	qǃăʟǃxꞏᵋiʼdała	g̣wᴇg̣wāẋwᴇlał
Grubb	hi7emtli	gelhʼmisehn	ḵʼatʼlhexidalha	g̱weg̱wax̱welalh
Uʼmista	hiʼa̱mtli	ga̱łʼmisa̱n	ḵ̓at̓ła̱xidała	g̱wa̱g̱wax̱wa̱lał
NAPA	hiʔəmƛi	gəłm̓isən	q̓aƛ̓əxidała	ǧʷəǧʷax̌ʷəlał

== Morphosyntax ==
Expansion of stems through suffixation is a central feature of the language, which transforms a relatively small lexicon of roots into a large and precise vocabulary. Different linguistic analyses have grouped these suffixes into classes in various ways, including "formative" vs. "incremental" and "governing" vs. "restrictive". (Boas 1947) rejects these morphosyntactic classifications and divides suffixes into various classes based mainly on semantic criteria. Nevertheless, there are morphosyntactic facts that distinguish classes of suffixes, including suffix ordering and the existence of paradigms for certain suffix types. At a minimum, there is sufficient evidence from syntax and phonology to distinguish between stem-forming suffixes and inflectional suffixes. The classes are comparable to the distinction between derivational and inflectional morphology although they are not necessarily homologous with them.

=== Stem-forming suffixes ===
The suffixes in Kwakʼwala can be grouped into at least nineteen different classes, principally on semantic grounds. (Boas 1947, p. 237) In the order given by Boas, the classes correspond generally but not completely to the order in which these suffixes appear within a word:

1. General locatives: e.g. =axʲsa "away" (maːxtsʼaxʲsa "to go away for shame"); =ʔdzu "on a flat object" (ʔaleːwədzəweʔ "sea hunter on flat, i.e. Orion").
2. Special locatives: e.g. -ʔstu "round opening, eye, door" (t͡ɬeːχʼʷstu "to miss a round place"); =is "open space, bottom of sea, world, beach, in body" (mˀəɡʷiːs "round thing in stomach").
3. Special locatives referring to body parts: e.g. -!pəla "throat" (teːkʼʷəpəla "to have hanging on chest"); -!iq "in mind" (nˀeːnˀkʼʲiχʼid "to begin to say in mind").
4. Limitations of form: Generally used with numerals, e.g. =ukʷ "human beings" (malˀuːkʷ "two persons"); -tsʼaq "long" (nˀəmpˈinatsʼaxsta "only once along street of village").
5. Temporal suffixes: e.g. -xʲid "recent past" (qaːsaxʲid "he went (about a week ago)"); -ajadzəwˀaɬ "used to be, to do" (t͡ɬiːqˈinuχajadzəwˀaɬ "used to be a canoe-builder").
6. Suffixes creating a transitive verb: e.g. -a, which turns a static or intransitive verb or a noun into a transitive verb: cf. ʔamχ "water-tight" and ʔamχa "to make water-tight"; and jaːsikʷ "tallow" and jaːsikʷa "to put tallow on".
7. Aspect: e.g. -(ə)s "continuously" (-!məmiːχəs "to sleep continuously, all the time"); -aːɬa "to be in the position of performing an act" (xʲuːsaɬa "to be at rest").
8. Plurality (human): i.e. -xʲdaʔχʷ (ʔaχiːdəxʲdaʔχʷ "they took").
9. Mode: e.g. -uʔ "hypothetical" (qasuʔ wət͡ɬasuʔt͡ɬuʔ "if you should be asked"); -xʲ "exhortative" (ɢʷalaxʲənts "do not let us do so!")
10. Passive: e.g. =əm "passive of verbs with instrumental" (halaːɢimaχa maːmajuɬtsila "it is paid to the midwife"); -ɬ "passive of verbs expressing sensations and mental actions; also sensations produced by outer actions" (ʔamdəɬ "to be affected by a furuncle").
11. Restriction of subject: e.g. -(xʲ)sanala "some" ((huːχʷsanalaɡʲəliɬ "some of them vomit in house"); -amənqʷəla "some" (kʲˈəlxʲamənqʷəla "some are unripe").
12. Nominal suffixes: e.g. -!ənχ "season" (xʲaːmˀaʔənχ "season of scarcity of food"); =id "the one by whom one is owned as" (qʼaːɡʷid "master (i.e. the one by whom one is owned as a slave)").
13. Verbal suffixes: e.g. =alisəm "to die of inner troubles" (xʷəljalisəm "to die of longing"); -buɬa "to pretend" (qʼʷaːsabuɬa "to pretend to cry").
14. Adverbial/adjectival suffixes: e.g. -kʲas "real, really" (nənwalakʼʷinikʲasus "your real supernatural power"); -dzi "large" (qʼaːsadzikʲas "a great number of sea otters").
15. Source of information: e.g. -lˀ(a) "it is said" (χənt͡ɬəlalˀ "very much, it is said"); -ʔəŋɡʲa "in a dream" (laʔəŋɡʲa "in a dream it was seen that he went").
16. Degree of certainty: e.g. -ɡʲanəm "perhaps" (suːɡʲanəm "you perhaps"); -dza "emphatic certainty" (ladzat͡ɬən "I am going to go").
17. Conjunctions: e.g. -mˀ "referring to a previous subject of conversation or narrative"; -tˈa "but, on his part".
18. Emotional attitudes: e.g. -id͡l "astonishing!" (saʔid͡la "is that you?!"); -niʔsd͡l "oh if!" (-ɡʲaːχniʔsd͡liʔ "oh, if he would come!").
19. Auxiliary suffixes: e.g. -ɡʲəɬ "motion without cessation, away" (uːχt͡ɬəɡʲəɬəχsa "to lift a load out of a canoe"); -əm "plural of locative suffixes" (jəpəmliɬ "to stand in a row in the house").

=== Inflectional suffixes ===
There are two major types of inflectional suffixes in Kwakʼwala: verbal suffixes that modify a predicate; and nominal clitics, which may agree with a noun present in the sentence, or may be entirely pronominal.

=== Verbal inflection ===
A typologically notable feature of Kwakʼwala is the distinction made in verbal conjugation between visible and invisible subjects. A distinction is also made between subjects that are near the listener and those that are far. The verb paradigm for la "to go" (classified as a Paradigm 2 verb) illustrates these properties (Boas 1947, p. 261):

	Indicative	Interrogative
1sg.	lən	laːʔən
1pl.	lekʲ	---
2sg./pl.	las	laːsa
3sg. near-me visible	lakʲ	laːʔəkʲ
3sg. near-me invisible	laɡʲaʔ	laːʔəɡʲaʔ
3pl. near-you visible	laχ	laːʔuχʷ
3pl. near-you invisible	laʔ	laːʔuʔ
3pl. elsewhere visible	la	laːʔiʔ
3pl. elsewhere invisible	laːʔ	laːʔijˀa

=== Nominal inflection ===
An entity can be present in a sentence in one of three ways: as a full overt noun, as a pronoun, or without any overt exponent. In each case, the entity will also be represented by an agreement clitic. If the entity takes the form of a noun or pronoun, the clitic will be from the prenominal set; if the entity has no overt exponent, a pronominal clitic will be used. Clitics always precede the nominal with which they agree, which violates the generalization that Kwakʼwala affixes are always suffixing. However, the clitic always forms a phonological word with the preceding word rather than the nominal, with the result that the suffixing generalization is always true as far as the phonology is concerned.

Verbal suffixes are shown in the following table:

	Pronominal			Prenominal		
	Subject	Object	Instrumental	Subject	Object	Instrumental
1sg.	-ən(t͡ɬ)	–	-ən(t͡ɬ)			
1pl. inclusive	-ənts	–	-ənts			
1pl. exclusive	-əntsuxʼʷ	–	-əntsuxʼʷ			
2sg./pl.	-əs	-ut͡ɬ	-us			
3sg./pl.	–	-q	-s	-e	-χ	-s

Because first and second person entities are always deictically accessible, there is no distinction between demonstrative and non-demonstrative clitics. However, third person clitics are distinguished in this way. As with verbal inflection, agreement clitics distinguish entities that are near and far and entities that are visible and invisible. Pronominal demonstrative clitics are shown in the following table (1 indicates an entity near the speaker; 2 indicates an entity near the hearer; 3 indicates an entity distant from both hearer and speaker):

		Subject	Object	Instrumental
1	visible	-kʲ	-qəkʲ	-səkʲ
1	invisible	-ɡʲaʔ	-χɡʲaʔ	-sɡʲaʔ
2	visible	-uχ	-qʷ	-suχ
2	invisible	-uʔ	-qʼʷ; -quʔ	-suʔ
3	visible	-iq	-q	-s
3	invisible	-iʔ	-qi	-si

Prenominal demonstrative clitics do not distinguish between visible and invisible entities. They are divided into two classes: consonantal forms (which precede proper names, indefinite nouns, and third person possessive forms whose possessor is not the subject of the sentence) and vocalic forms (which precede all other nouns and pronouns):

	Subject		Object		Instrumental	
	Consonantal	Vocalic	Consonantal	Vocalic	Consonantal	Vocalic
1	-ɡʲa	-ɡʲada	-χɡʲa	-χɡʲada	-sɡʲa	-sɡʲada
2	-uχ	-uχda	-χuχ; -χʷ	-χuχda; -χʷa	-suχ; -sa	-suχda; -sa
3	-i	-ida; -ida	-χ	-χa	-s	-sa

Another set of suffixes is used to simultaneously indicate the subject and object/instrument, as shown in the following tables. (When the extension of the subject and object/instrument overlap, no suffix is available. Another construction must be used to express this kind of reflexive relation.)

Subject			Object		
	1sg.	1pl. inclusive	1pl. exclusive	2-sg./pl.	3sg./pl.
1sg.	–	–	–	-ənt͡ɬut͡ɬ	-ənt͡ɬaq
1pl. inclusive	–	–	–	–	-əntsaq
1pl. exclusive	–	–	–	-ənuxʼʷut͡ɬ	-ənuxʼʷaq
2sg./pl.	ɡʲaχən	–	ɡʲaχənuxʼʷ	–	-siq
3sg./pl.	ɡʲaχən	ɡʲaχənts	ɡʲaχənuxʼʷ	-ut͡ɬ	-q

In the preceding table, forms with a first person object do not use a verbal suffix. Rather, they use a periphrastic auxiliary form of the verb ɡʲaχ "to come". The auxiliary precedes the main verb in the sentence.

Subject			Instrumental		
	1sg.	1pl. inclusive	1pl. exclusive	2-sg./pl.	3sg./pl.
1sg.	–	–	–	-ənt͡ɬus	-ənt͡ɬas
1pl. inclusive	–	–	–	–	-əntsas
1pl. exclusive	–	–	–	-ənuxʼʷus	-ənuxʼʷas
2sg./pl.	-setsən	–	-setsənuxʼʷ	–	-sis
3sg./pl.	-ən	-ənts	-ənuxʼʷ	-us	-s

Suffixation is also used for genitive constructions. These suffixes can be either prenominal/pronominal or postnominal. First person genitives allow either form. Third person genitives observe a robust differentiation between those cases in which the subject and possessor are the same entity and those in which they are not. In the former case, the instrumental suffix -s is added to the prenominal genitive marker, and the possessed noun take the postnominal demonstrative genitive ending. In the latter case, the instrumental -s attaches to the postnominal genitive ending on the possessed noun, and the prenominal suffix remains unchanged. (Boas 1947, p. 254)

The following table shows genitive suffixes for first and second person possessors. Prenominal forms include a distinction between first and second person while the distinction in postnominal forms is made by adding the pronominal verbal inflection for the appropriate person.

		Prenominal: 1st person	Prenominal: 2nd person	Postnominal
near-me	visible	-ɡʲin, -ɡʲints	-ɡʲas	-ɡʲ-
near-me	invisible	-ɡʲinuxʼʷ	-ɡʲas	-ɡʲa-
near-you	visible	-ən, -ənts	-us, -χs	-(a)q-
near-you	invisible	-ən, -ənts	-uχs	-(a)qʼ-
elsewhere	visible	-ənuxʼʷ	-is	-(i)-
elsewhere	invisible	-ənuxʼʷ	-is	-a-

Genitive suffixes with a third-person possessor are shown in the following table:

		Possessor is subject		Possessor is not subject	
		Prenominal	Postnominal	Prenominal	Postnominal
near-me	visible	-ɡʲas	-kʲ	-ɡʲa	-ɡʲas
near-me	invisible	-ɡʲas	-ɡʲaʔ	-ɡʲa	-ɡʲaʔəs
near-you	visible	-us	-q	-uχ	-(a)χs
near-you	invisible	-us	-qʼ	-uχ	-qʼəs
elsewhere	visible	-is		-i	-s
elsewhere	invisible	-is	-a	-i	-as

Prenominal forms for the objective and instrumental are formed by suffixing the prenominal forms given above to -χ or s, respectively.

Independent pronouns also exist in Kwakʼwala. Pronouns have verbal and nominal forms. Verbal forms inflect like other verbs. Nominal forms occur in subject, object, and instrumental forms. The full set of pronouns is shown in the following table:

		Verbal forms	Nominal forms		
		Verbal forms	Subject	Object	Instrumental
1sg.		nuːɡʷa	jən	ɡʲaχən	jən
1pl.	inclusive	nuːɡʷənts	jənts	ɡʲaχənts	jənts
1pl.	exclusive	nuːɡʷənuxʼʷ	jənuxʼʷ	ɡʲaχənuxʼʷ	jənuxʼʷ
2sg./pl.		su	jut͡ɬ	lat͡ɬ	jut͡ɬ
3sg./pl.	near-me	ɡʲa	jəχɡʲa	laχɡʲa	jəsɡʲa
3sg./pl.	near-you	ju	jəχuχ	laχuχ	jəsuχ
3sg./pl.	elsewhere	hi	jəχ	laq	jəs

Object forms are clearly related to ɡaχ "to come" (in the first person) and la "to go" (in the second and third person).

=== Syntax ===
Kwakʼwala formally distinguishes only three classes of words: predicates/substantives, particles, and exclamatory forms. Nouns and verbs are distinguished mainly by syntactic context. Thus, the bare form kʼʷasʼ "sit" is a verb; combined with an article-like particle, it serves as a noun: jəχa kʼʷasʼ "the one who sits" (Boas 1947).

A minimal sentence consists of a predicate. Although that is syntactically simple, it is not necessarily semantically impoverished. The rich morphological system of Kwakʼwala allows the expression of many features in a single predicate: ɢaɢakʼʲənt͡ɬut͡ɬ "I shall try to get you to be my wife"; ɬawadənt͡ɬasəkʲ "I have this one for my husband (lit. I am husband owner of him)" (Boas 1947, p. 281).

In sentences with greater syntactic complexity, word order is identical to the order in which inflectional morphemes are added to a stem, stem/predicate-subject-direct object-instrument-direct object:

kʷixid -ida bəɡʷanəm -a -χa qʼasa -s -is tʼəlwaɢaju
clubbed -the man -OBJ -the {sea otter} -INSTR -his club
The man clubbed the sea-otter with his club. (Boas 1947, p. 282), (Anderson 1984)

A number of clitics are used to mark agreement with nouns, including clitics for definiteness/deixis and case (including accusative and instrumental case). Clitics are positioned at the left edge of the noun they agree with but lean phonologically to their left. The result is a systematic mismatch between syntactic and phonological constituent structure such that on the surface, each prenominal word appears to be inflected to agree with the following noun.

That can be seen in the preceding example: the sentence-initial predicate kʷixidida includes a clitic /-ida/, which belongs together with the nominal bəɡʷanəmaχa in terms of syntactical constituency. That nominal, in turn, includes a clitic /-χa/, syntactically connected to the following noun, and so on.

== Bibliography ==
- Anderson, Stephen (1984). "Kwakwala Syntax and the Government-binding Theory". Syntax and Semantics. 16.
- Bach, Emmon (1975). "Long Vowels and Stress in Kwakiutl". Texas Linguistic Forum. 2: 9–19.
- Boas, Franz (1893). "Vocabulary of the Kwakiutl language". Proceedings of the American Philosophical Society. 31 (140): 34–82.
- Boas, Franz (1900). "Sketch of the Kwakiutl language". American Anthropologist. 2 (4): 708–721. doi:10.1525/aa.1900.2.4.02a00080. hdl:2027/aeu.ark:/13960/t1qf9712s.
- Boas, Franz (1924). "A Revised List of Kwakiutl Suffixes". International Journal of American Linguistics. 3 (1): 117–131. doi:10.1086/463753. S2CID 143653837.
- Boas, Franz (1931). "Notes on the Kwakiutl Vocabulary". International Journal of American Linguistics. 6 (3/4): 163–178. doi:10.1086/463790. S2CID 144062209.
- Boas, Franz (1932). "Notes on Some Recent Changes in the Kwakiutl language". International Journal of American Linguistics. 7 (1/2): 90–93. doi:10.1086/463797. S2CID 143779471.
- Boas, Franz (1947). Helene Boas Yampolsky (ed.). "Kwakiutl Grammar (With a Glossary of the Suffixes)". Transactions of the American Philosophical Society. 37 (3). American Philosophical Society: 201–377. doi:10.2307/1005538. JSTOR 1005538.
- Davenport, Tristan (2007). Alternations in Place and Laryngeality: On the Coda Condition of Kwakwʼala. Manuscript: University of California, Santa Cruz.
- Grubb, David (1969). A Kwakiutl Phonology. MA thesis: University of Victoria.
- Grubb, David (1977). A Practical Writing System and Short Dictionary of Kwakwʼala (Kwakiutl). Ottawa: National Museum of Man.
- Howe, Darin Mathew (2000). Oowekyala segmental phonology (PDF) (Doctoral dissertation). Vancouver: University of British Columbia. doi:10.14288/1.0090571.
- Struijke, Caro (2000). Existential Faithfulness: A Study of Reduplicative TETU, Feature Movement, and Dissimilation. PhD dissertation: University of Maryland.
- Wilson, Stephen (1986). "Metrical Structure in Wakashan Phonology". Proceedings of the Twelfth Annual Meeting of the Berkeley Linguistics Society. 12: 283–291. doi:10.3765/bls.v12i0.1857.
- Zec, Draga (1994). Sonority Constraints on Prosodic Structure. Garland Publishing.
