= Caroline Running Wolf =

Caroline Running Wolf is a language activist and scientific researcher. She was born in Sacramento, California but also raised in Montana, Canada, and Germany.

== Background ==
Caroline Running Wolf, also known as Old Coyote or Crow, is a XR producer and language activist. Running Wolf is an active and enrolled citizen of the Crow people, which also may be known as the Apsaalooke (Crow pronunciation: [ə̀ˈpsáːɾòːɡè]), Nation She is the daughter of nomadic parents, with a Swabian (German) mother along side Pikuni (Blackfeet), Oglala (Lakota), and Ho-Chunk (Winnebago) heritage.She was raised accross the United States, Canada, and Germany. Self-described as a "Cultural Acclimation Artist" (artists exploring cultural assimilation and cross-cultural identity through the use of visual art, focusing on heritage retention, adaptation, and cultural shifts) and media activist, she taught herself 11 languages.

== Early life and education ==
Caroline Running Wolf is married to Michael Running Wolf, a software engineer and former Amazon Alexa engineer. Running Wolf attended Montana State University and graduated in 2015 with a master's degree in Native American Studies. Later, Running Wolf graduated from the University of British Columbia with a PhD in anthropology. While at the University of British Columbia, she began developing an augmented reality (AR) experience where people can learn and practice their native language. She focuses on software for specifically, Wakashan languages; even more specifically she has said to been focusing on Kwak'wala. Running Wolf believes the amount of money spent on currently preserving Indigenous languages is nothing compared to the amount spent in the past to take away their culture in the past.

== Research and Career ==
In 2020, Caroline Running Wolf contributed to the "Indigenous Protocol and Artificial Intelligence" position paper published by the Indigenous Protocol and Artificial Intelligence Working Group. The paper outlined guidelines for creating ethical artificial intelligence centered around Indigenous perspectives.

In 2022, Caroline Running Wolf served as a co-presenter at the Institute on Collaborative Language Research (CoLang) hosted by the University of Montana, leading a session on "Practical A.I. for Language Maintenance."

In 2023, Caroline Running Wolf co-founded a nonprofit named the First Languages AI Reality (FLAIR) initiative which has the goal of preserving Native American languages, many which are commonly being forgotten by modern day. As Indigenous languages begin to phase out of modern society due to cultural assimilation, the FLAIR initiative is to apply AI, alongside augmented reality (AR) to create generative AI models which can be used for language learning, audio transcription, voice-controlled technology and much more, improving inclusivity and immersivity in cultural exhanges and activities. One of Running Wolf's goal for the intiative is to be able to have learners point at an object and instantly receive the word for that object in whichever native language of their choosing.

Additionally, Caroline Running Wolf and her husband, Michael Running Wolf, founded a nonprofit organization known as Buffalo Tongue. Together, they create both virtual and augmented reality experiences in order to advocate for Native American language, voices, and culture.
