= Pilagá language =

Guaicuruan language spoken in Argentina

Pilagá
- pit´laxá, pitelara laqtaq
- Native to: Argentina
- Region: Formosa Province
- Ethnicity: Pilagá
- Native speakers: 4,000 (2004)
- Language family: Guaicuruan: Southern; Pilagá

Language codes
- ISO 639-3: plg
- Glottolog: pila1245
- ELP: Pilagá

Pilagá is a Guaicuruan language spoken by 4,000 people in the Bermejo and Pilcomayo River valleys, western Formosa Province, in northeastern Argentina.

== Sociocultural context ==
The geographical distribution into communities is permeated by pan-Chacoan social organization of people into bands.

According to José Alberto Braunstein, among the Chaco groups several bands constitute a "tribe", identified by a common name and associated by marriage and exchange. He states that tribes have been preferably endogamous, with uxorilocal postmarital residence. Among the Pilagá, tribes have identified with names of regional animals and these traditional denominations persist in present times.

As many anthropologists have noted, the Chaco groups, including the Pilagá, have been hunter-gatherers. Hunting also includes fishing and collection of honey. Hunting is exclusively the domain of men, while gathering of wild fruits, palm hearts, mesquite (Prosopis sp.) and firewood is done regularly by women. The major animals hunted are species of deer and armadillos. Among the fish specimens are surubí (Pseudoplatystoma corruscans), pacú (Piaractus mesopotamicus) and dorado (Salminus brasiliensis).

With the advancement of European contact since the conquest, and with the establishment at different times of colonies, farms and missions, Chaco groups, including the Pilagá, began losing their territories. They became confined to smaller portions of lands, and as a consequence, they discontinued their hunter-gathering activities. Today, with sedentarization, Pilagá people combine traditional practices with land-cultivation and cattle-raising at a small scale, and the commerce of basketry, tapestry and wooden artifacts.

== Classification ==
Pilagá belongs to the grouping of Guaykuruan (also spelled 'Waikuruan' or 'Guaicuruan') languages spoken in the Gran Chaco of South America. The word Chaco, of Quichua origin, means 'territory of hunting'. The Gran Chaco covers an area of about 1 million square kilometers, of which 50% is on Argentinian land, and the other half distributed between Paraguay, Bolivia and Brazil. Out of the six languages that have been claimed to belong to this family, only four, i.e. Kadiwéu (or Caduveo), Mocoví, Pilagá and Toba, are currently spoken. The other two, Abipón and Mbayá, became extinct more than a century ago.

== Degree of endangerment ==
Pilagá enjoys a good level of vitality, being the first language children acquire before starting school. However, Formosa's Ministry of Education has not developed key bilingual educational programs or curriculum for the Pilagá. Moreover, only a few schools (six of a total of sixteen) have Pilagá-speaking aides working together with certified teachers as translators. The program is also rather ineffective for lack of scope or sequence for Pilagá instruction and few didactic materials.

Even though Pilagá use in daily communication between adults connotes solidarity, younger speakers use code-switching apparently to fill gaps in their knowledge of the vernacular language. Those areas where Pilagá language and traditions are best preserved are the rural communities. However, the lack of native-language schooling to Pilagá children makes the future of the language bleak.

== Phonology ==
The inventory includes obstruents and sonorants, totalizing eighteen consonant phonemes, and four vowels. In 1996 the Pilagá designed the orthographic system currently used.

=== Consonants ===
		Labial	Alveolar	Palatal	Velar	Uvular	Pharyngeal	Glottal
Nasal		m	n	ɲ				
Plosive	voiceless	p	t		k	q		ʔ
Plosive	voiced		d		ɡ			
Affricate				tʃ				
Fricative			s				ʕ	h
Lateral			l	ʎ				
Glide		w		j				

=== Vowels ===
	Front	Back
Close	i	
Mid	e	o
Open		a

== Orthography ==
The alphabet is:

Aa	Ƀƀ	Čč	Dd	Ee	Gg	꟎꟏	Hh	Ii	Kk	Ll	Ꟛꟛ
Mm	Nn	Ññ	Oo	Pp	Qq	Ss	Tt	Ww	Yy	ʼ	

Both ⟨ƀ⟩ and ⟨w⟩ are used for /w/. The letter ⟨ƀ⟩ is normally typeset with the stroke across the bowl, ⟨b̶⟩. This detail needs to be handled by the font. ⟨Ꟛ ꟛ⟩ are Latin lambda, which was only added to Unicode in 2024 and may be substituted with the Greek letters if font support is not available. ⟨꟎ ꟏⟩ are a casing pair for ⟨ʕ⟩ and were only added to Unicode in 2025; non-casing ⟨ʕ⟩ may be substituted if font support is not available.

Lower-case barred b

Lower-case ʕ

Capital ʕ

Lower-case Latin λ

Capital Latin λ

== Bibliography ==
Braunstein, José Alberto (1983). Algunos rasgos de la organización social de los indígenas del Gran Chaco. Buenos Aires: Universidad de Buenos Aires, Facultad de Filosofía y Letras, Instituto de Ciencias Antropológicas.

- Buckwalter, Alberto. 1994. Vocabulario pilagá. Elkhardt, Indiana: Mennonite Board of Missions.

Cordeu, Edgardo; Siffredi, A. (1971). De la algarroba al algodón: Movimiento mesiánico de los guaycurú. Buenos Aires: Juárez Editor.

- Vidal, Alejandra. 2001. Pilagá Grammar. PhD dissertation. Department of Linguistics. University of Oregon. Eugene, Oregon.
- Vidal, Alejandra et.alii (In press). Materiales para la enseñanza de la Lengua pilagá. 3 Volumes (Grammar, Activities, Key and pedagogical orientations). Ministerio de Educación, Ciencia y Tecnología de la Nación. Argentina.
- Vidal, Alejandra et alli. Trilingüal Pilagá-Spanish-English Talking Dictionary, with ethnographical, grammatical notes and examples. Hans Rausing Endangered Languages Project. Universidad Nacional de ormosa, Argentina.
