= Pacific Northwest languages =

Areal grouping of North American languages

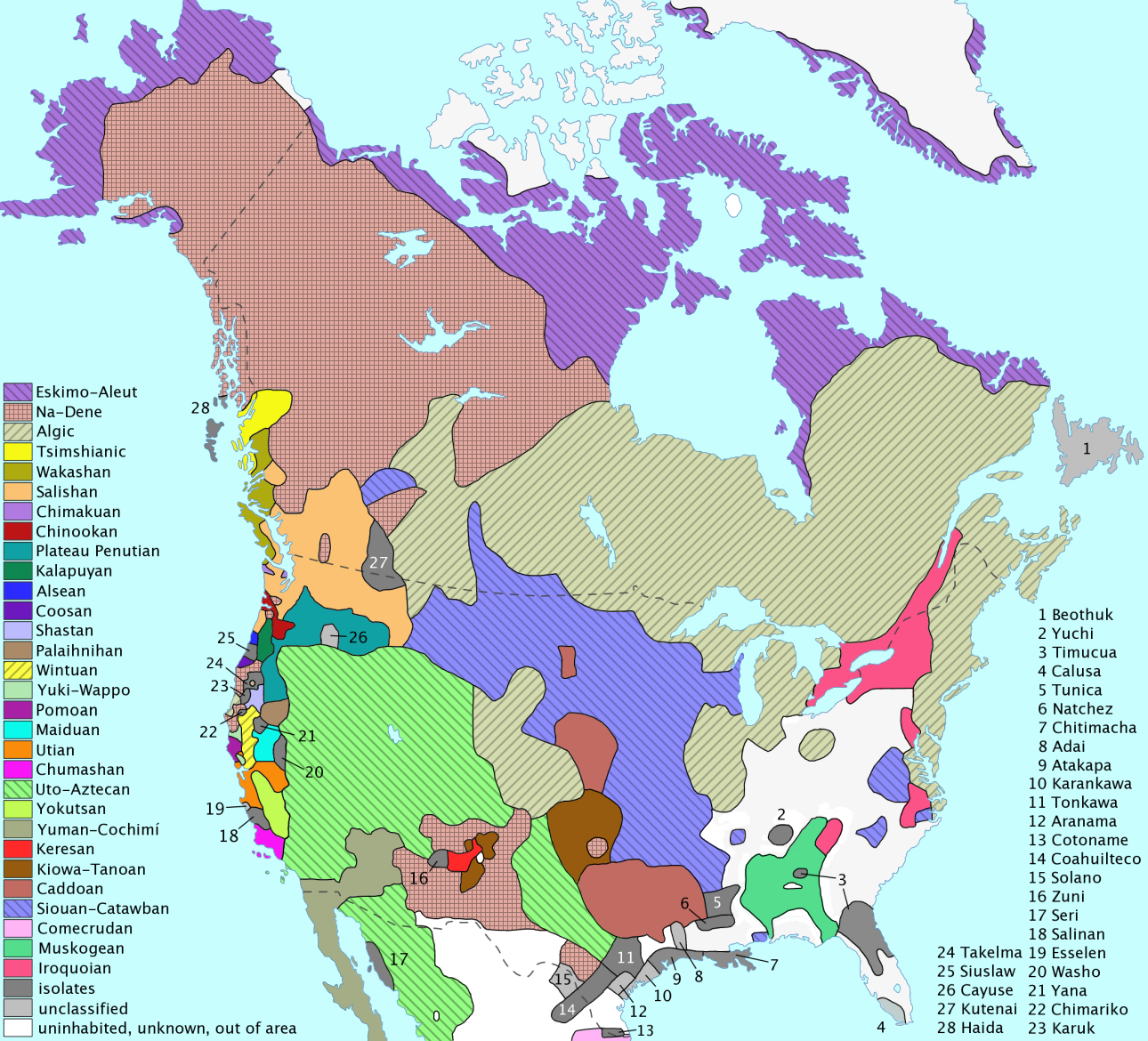
Pre-contact distribution of North American language families north of Mexico

The Pacific Northwest languages are the indigenous languages of the Pacific Northwest of North America. The Pacific Northwest is the second-most diverse linguistic area, or sprachbund, in North America after California, and depending on the definition used, Pacific Northwest languages form about a dozen distinct language families and include over 50 individual languages. They have numerous shared areal features despite a lack of universal common ancestry, including animacy hierarchies and case markers that cliticize to the end of the word before the noun phrase being marked for case.

The linguistic area is centered on the Salishan, Wakashan and Chimakuan families. Some features are also shared with Tsimshianic, Chinookan and Sahaptian languages, as well as Kutenai, a language isolate.

== Phonology ==
Languages in the area generally have relatively small vowel inventories and relatively large consonant inventories, particularly obstruents; a number of typologically uncommon phonemes can be observed in them, such as glottalized sonorants and pharyngeals. Characteristic areal features include:

- Contrast between pulmonic and ejective stops (plosives and affricates)
- Contrast between velars and uvulars
- Contrast between plain and labialized velars and uvulars
  - Languages in a nested linguistic area lack plain velars, contrasting labialized velars with palatalized counterparts instead; this phenomenon has been observed in Oowekyala, Kwakʼwala, Heiltsuk and Nuxalk, among others. In the Coast Salish languages, historical plain velars underwent further palatalization, becoming sibilants.
- The existence of complex consonant clusters
  - Nuxalk and Oowekyala are noteworthy in allowing for the construction of words, phrases and entire sentences using only obstruents, e.g. Nuxalk kʼclhhtscw slhxwtlhhts 'you had seen me go through the passage'.

== Classification ==
The classification of Pacific Northwest languages has been debated upon by linguists, with some placing them into macro-families such as Mosan and Penutian and others rejecting these proposals. Because of this controversy and discrepancies between the definition of the language area, between seven and eighteen different language families are represented in the region, including several language isolates and more than 50 member languages. The following tree reflects the classification given by Thompson and Kinkade except for not grouping the last five families under Penutian.

=== Overview ===
- Pacific Northwest languages
  - Na-Dene
    - Tlingit
    - †Eyak
    - Athabaskan (Note: Athabaskan languages are found outside the Pacific Northwest, but have a few languages that are included as part of the sprachbund. David Beck includes all Athabaskan languages along the Northwest Coast in the Pacific Northwest language area, including languages that are classified as Northern Athabaskan.)
      - †Kwalhioqua–Clatskanie
      - †Pacific Coast
  - Haida (Note: language isolate)
  - Tsimshianic
    - Maritime Tsimshian
    - Nass-Gitksan
  - Wakashan
    - Northern
    - Southern (Nootkan)
  - †Chimakuan
    - Chemakum
    - Quileute
  - Salishan
    - Nuxalk
    - Central (Coast) Salish
    - †Tsamosan
    - †Tillamook
    - Interior Salish
  - †Chinookan
    - Lower Chinook
    - Upper Chinook (including Kathlamet)
  - †Takelma–Kalapuyan
    - Takelma
    - Kalapuya
  - †Alsean
    - Alsea
    - Yaquina
  - †Siuslaw
    - Siuslaw
    - Lower Umpqua
  - †Coosan
    - Hanis
    - Miluk

== Bibliography ==
- Beck, David (2000). "Grammatical Convergence and the Genesis of Diversity in the Northwest Coast Sprachbund". Anthropological Linguistics. 42 (2): 147–213. JSTOR 30028547.
- Howe, Darin Mathew (2000). Oowekyala segmental phonology (PDF) (Doctoral dissertation). Vancouver: University of British Columbia. doi:10.14288/1.0090571.
- Mithun, Marianne (2010). "Contact and North American Languages". The Handbook of Language Contact. Oxford, UK: Wiley-Blackwell. pp. 673–694. doi:10.1002/9781444318159.ch33. ISBN 978-1-4051-7580-7.
- Nater, Hank (2026-03-12). All-Obstruent Words in Bella Coola: Phonotactics, Diachrony, Geography.
- Thomason, Sarah (2000). "Linguistic areas and language history" (PDF). In Gilbers, Dicky; Nerbonne, John; Schaeken, Jos (eds.). Languages in Contact. Amsterdam: Rodopi. pp. 311–327. ISBN 978-90-420-1322-3.
- Thompson, Laurence C.; Kinkade, M. Dale (1990). "Languages". In Suttles, Wayne (ed.). Handbook of North American Indians. Vol. 17: Northwest Coast. pp. 30–51.
- Watanabe, Honoré; Sasama, Furiko (2007). "Languages of the Northwest Coast". In Miyaoka, Osahito; Sakiyama, Osamu; Krauss, Michael E. (eds.). The Vanishing Languages of the Pacific Rim. Oxford University Press. pp. 418–441. ISBN 978-019-926662-3.
