= Lambda =

Eleventh letter in the Greek alphabet

Lambda (/ˈlæmdə/; uppercase Λ, lowercase λ; Greek: λάμ(β)δα, lám(b)da; Ancient Greek: λά(μ)βδα, lá(m)bda), sometimes rendered lamda, labda or lamma, is the eleventh letter of the Greek alphabet, representing the voiced alveolar lateral approximant IPA: [l]; it derives from the Phoenician letter Lamed, and gave rise to Latin L and Cyrillic El (Л). In the system of Greek numerals, lambda has a value of 30. The ancient grammarians typically called it λάβδα (lắbdă, [lábda]) in Classical Greek times, whereas in Modern Greek it is λάμδα (lámda, [ˈlamða]), while the spelling λάμβδα (lámbda) was used (to varying degrees) throughout the lengthy transition between the two.

In early Greek alphabets, the shape and orientation of lambda varied. Most variants consisted of two straight strokes, one longer than the other, connected at their ends. The angle might be in the upper-left, lower-left ("Western" alphabets) or top ("Eastern" alphabets). Other variants had a vertical line with a horizontal or sloped stroke running to the right. With the general adoption of the Ionic alphabet, Greek settled on an angle at the top; the Romans put the angle at the lower-left.

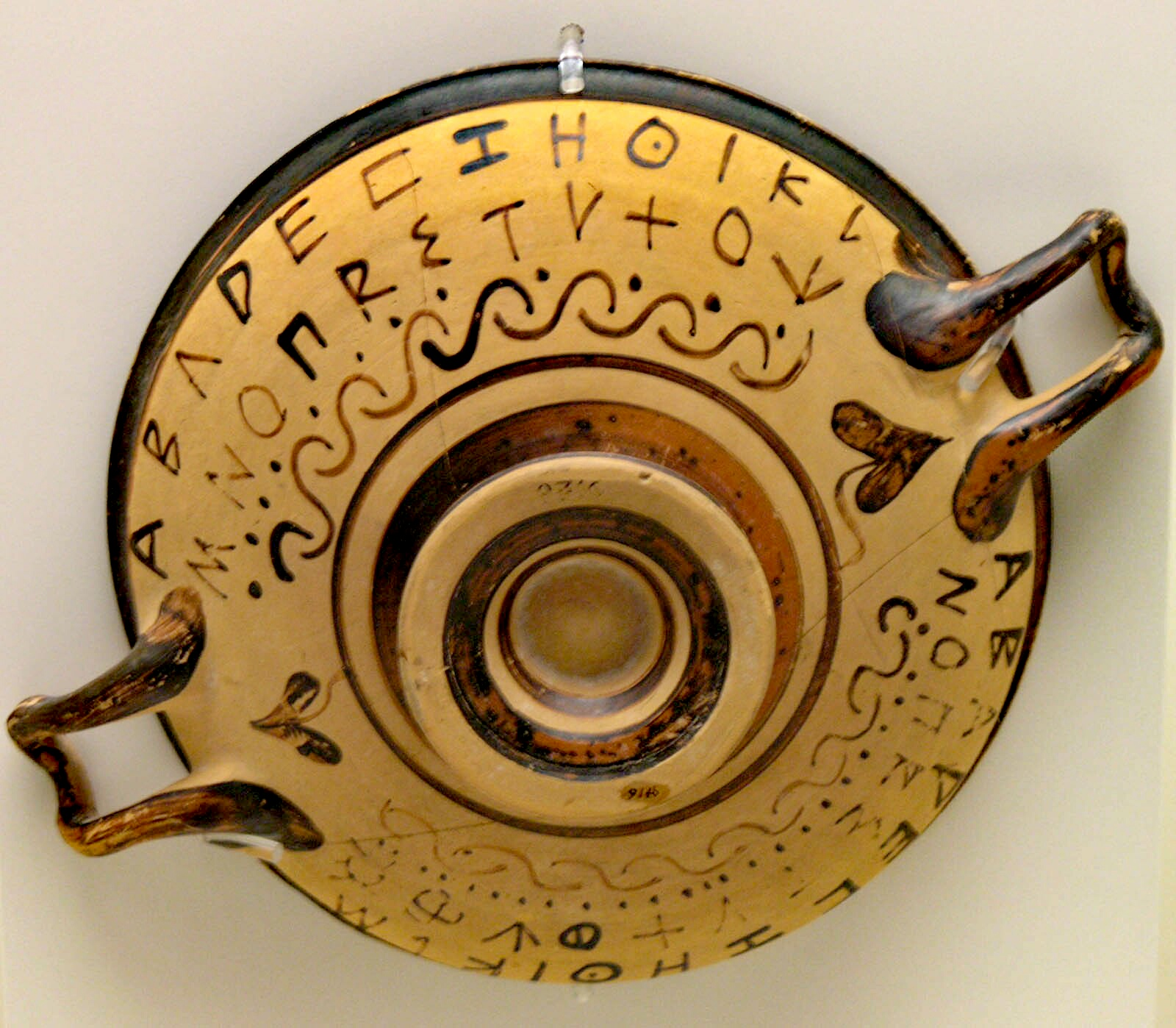
The Greek alphabet on a black figure vessel, with a Phoenician-lamed-shaped lambda. The gamma has the shape of modern lambda.

== Uses ==
=== Uppercase ===
Examples of the symbolic use of uppercase lambda include:

- The lambda particle is a type of subatomic particle in subatomic particle physics.
- Lambda is the set of logical axioms in the axiomatic method of logical deduction in first-order logic.
- Uppercase Lambda is often used as a stylized form of uppercase A, especially in science fiction.
- There is a poetical allusion to the use of Lambda as a shield blazon by the Spartans.
- Lambda is the von Mangoldt function in mathematical number theory.
- Lambda denotes the de Bruijn–Newman constant which is closely connected with Riemann's hypothesis.
- In statistics, lambda is used for the likelihood ratio.
- In statistics, Wilks's lambda is used in multivariate analysis of variance (MANOVA analysis) to compare group means on a combination of dependent variables.
- In the spectral decomposition of matrices, lambda indicates the diagonal matrix of the eigenvalues of the matrix.
- In computer science, lambda is the time window over which a process is observed for determining the working memory set for a digital computer's virtual memory management.
- In astrophysics, lambda represents the likelihood that a small body will encounter a planet or a dwarf planet leading to a deflection of a significant magnitude. An object with a large value of lambda is expected to have cleared its neighbourhood, satisfying the current definition of a planet.
- In crystal optics, lambda is used to represent a lattice period.
- In electrochemistry, lambda denotes the "equivalent conductance" of an electrolyte solution.
- In cosmology, lambda is the symbol for the cosmological constant, a term added to some dynamical equations to account for the accelerating expansion of the universe.
- In optics, lambda denotes the grating pitch of a Bragg reflector.
- In politics, the lambda is the symbol of Identitarianism, a white nationalist movement that originated in France before spreading out to the rest of Europe and later on to North America, Australia and New Zealand. The Identitarian lambda represents the Battle of Thermopylae.

=== Lowercase ===
Lower-case lambda

Examples of the symbolic use of lowercase lambda include:

- λ indicates the radioactivity decay constant in nuclear physics and radioactivity. This constant is very simply related (by a multiplicative constant) to the half-life of any radioactive material.
- In evolutionary algorithms, λ indicates the number of offspring that would be generated from μ current population in each generation. The terms μ and λ are originated from evolution strategy notation.
- In probability theory, λ represents the density of occurrences within a time interval, as modelled by the Poisson distribution.
- In mathematical logic and computer science, λ is used to introduce anonymous functions expressed with the concepts of lambda calculus.
- λ indicates an eigenvalue in the mathematics of linear algebra.
- In the physics of particles, lambda indicates the thermal de Broglie wavelength
- In the physics of electric fields, lambda sometimes indicates the linear charge density of a uniform line of electric charge (measured in coulombs per meter).
- Lambda denotes a Lagrange multiplier in multi-dimensional calculus.
- In solid-state electronics, lambda indicates the channel length modulation parameter of a MOSFET.
- In ecology, lambda denotes the long-term intrinsic growth rate of a population. This value is often calculated as the dominant eigenvalue of the age/size class matrix.
- In formal language theory and in computer science, lambda denotes the empty string.
- Lambda is a nonstandard symbol in the International Phonetic Alphabet for the voiced alveolar lateral affricate [dɮ], stemming from its use in Americanist phonetic notation.
- Lambda denotes the Lebesgue measure in mathematical set theory.
- The Goodman and Kruskal's lambda in statistics indicates the proportional reduction in error when one variable's values are used to predict the values of another variable.
- Lambda denotes the oxygen sensor in a vehicle that measures the air-to-fuel ratio in the exhaust gases of an internal-combustion engine.
- A Lambda 4S solid-fuel rocket was used to launch Japan's first orbital satellite in 1970.
- Lambda denotes the failure rate of devices and systems in reliability theory, and it is measured in failure events per hour. Numerically, this lambda is also the reciprocal of the mean time between failures.
- In criminology, lambda denotes an individual's frequency of offences.
- In electrochemistry, lambda also denotes the ionic conductance of a given ion (the composition of the ion is generally shown as a subscript to the lambda character).
- In neurobiology, lambda denotes the length constant (or exponential rate of decay) of the electric potential across the cell membrane along a length of a nerve cell's axon.
- In the science and technology of heat transfer, lambda denotes the heat of vaporization per mole of material (a.k.a. its "latent heat").
- In the technology and science of celestial navigation, lambda denotes the longitude as opposed to the Roman letter "L", which denotes the latitude.
- A block style lambda is used as a recurring symbol in the Valve computer game series Half-Life, referring to the Lambda Complex of the fictional Black Mesa Research Facility, as well as making appearances in the sequel Half-Life 2, and its subsequent prequel Half-Life: Alyx as an in-universe symbol of resistance.
- In 1970, a lowercase lambda was chosen by Tom Doerr as the symbol of the New York chapter of the Gay Activists Alliance. The lambda symbol became associated with gay liberation and recognized as an LGBTQ symbol for some time afterwards, being used as such by the International Gay Rights Congress in Edinburgh.
- Golomb–Dickman constant
- In continuum mechanics, lambda represents one of the Lamé parameters, which is a material property that arises in stress-strain relationships.
- λ indicates the wavelength of any wave, especially in physics, electrical engineering, and mathematics.
- In psychology, λ indicates the maximum conditioning possible for unconditioned stimuli (US) in the Rescorla-Wagner model.

=== Litra symbol ===
The Roman libra and Byzantine lítra (λίτρα), which served as both the pound mass unit and liter volume unit, were abbreviated in Greek using lambda with modified forms of the iota subscript ⟨λͅ⟩. These are variously encoded in Unicode. The Ancient Greek Numbers Unicode block includes 10183 greek litra sign (𐆃) as well as 𐅢, which is described as 10162 greek acrophonic hermionian ten but was much more common as a form of the litra sign. A variant of the sign can be formed from 0338 combining long solidus overlay and either 039B greek capital letter lamda (Λ̸) or 03BB greek small letter lamda (λ̸).

== Unicode ==
Unicode uses the (Modern Greek-based) spelling "lamda" in character names, instead of "lambda", due to "the pre-existing names in ISO 8859-7, as well as preferences expressed by the Greek National Body". Latin versions of lambda were added to Unicode in 2024 for the Salishan and Wakashan languages in Canada.

- U+039B Λ GREEK CAPITAL LETTER LAMDA (&Lambda;)
- U+03BB λ GREEK SMALL LETTER LAMDA (&lambda;)
- U+1D27 ᴧ GREEK LETTER SMALL CAPITAL LAMDA
- U+2C96 Ⲗ COPTIC CAPITAL LETTER LAULA
- U+2C97 ⲗ COPTIC SMALL LETTER LAULA
- U+A7DA Ꟛ LATIN CAPITAL LETTER LAMBDA
- U+A7DB ꟛ LATIN SMALL LETTER LAMBDA
- U+1038D 𐎍 UGARITIC LETTER LAMDA
- U+1D6B2 𝚲 MATHEMATICAL BOLD CAPITAL LAMDA (Note: The mathematical characters should only be used in math. Stylized Greek text should be encoded using the normal Greek letters, with markup and formatting to indicate text style.)
- U+1D6CC 𝛌 MATHEMATICAL BOLD SMALL LAMDA
- U+1D6EC 𝛬 MATHEMATICAL ITALIC CAPITAL LAMDA
- U+1D706 𝜆 MATHEMATICAL ITALIC SMALL LAMDA
- U+1D726 𝜦 MATHEMATICAL BOLD ITALIC CAPITAL LAMDA
- U+1D740 𝝀 MATHEMATICAL BOLD ITALIC SMALL LAMDA
- U+1D760 𝝠 MATHEMATICAL SANS-SERIF BOLD CAPITAL LAMDA
- U+1D77A 𝝺 MATHEMATICAL SANS-SERIF BOLD SMALL LAMDA
- U+1D79A 𝞚 MATHEMATICAL SANS-SERIF BOLD ITALIC CAPITAL LAMDA
- U+1D7B4 𝞴 MATHEMATICAL SANS-SERIF BOLD ITALIC SMALL LAMDA

== See also ==
- Barred lambda - ƛ
- El (Cyrillic) – Л, л
- Fraser alphabet#Consonants
- Greek letters used in mathematics, science, and engineering
- Half-Life (series)
- Samsung, an electronics company that uses the glyph "Λ" in its logo as a styled "A".
