= Barred lambda =

Modified letter of the Greek alphabet

- Ƛ ƛ

Usage
- Writing system: Latin script
- Type: alphabetic
- Language of origin: Americanist phonetic notation
- Sound values: /tɬ/
- In Unicode: U+A7DC, U+019B

History
- Development: Λ λ: Ꟛ ꟛ; Ƛ ƛ

The barred lambda (Ƛ ƛ) (U+A7DC Ƛ LATIN CAPITAL LETTER LAMBDA WITH STROKE, U+019B ƛ LATIN SMALL LETTER LAMBDA WITH STROKE), is a modified letter of the Greek alphabet, commonly encountered in North American linguistics. It is used by the Salishan and Wakashan languages in Canada. In Americanist phonetic notation, it is also known as running man or blam, and is used to transcribe a voiceless alveolar lateral affricate [t͡ɬ]. In physics, it represents the reduced Compton wavelength, i.e. the Compton wavelength λ divided by 2π.

Cased forms of the barred lambda. The capital was assigned to Unicode in 2024.

It was first used in a phonetics context in American Anthropologist in 1934:

λ for [dl] has been used in Eskimo by Jenness ... ƛ for [tł] is an innovation formed from λ as ł from l.

It is also used for the affricate [t͡ɬ] in transcribing the Sahaptin language, e.g., iƛúpna ‘he jumped’, and it is commonly used for the same purpose in several languages of the Caucasus, such as Hinuq. In addition, its counterpart with a combining comma above right (U+0315), ƛ̓, is used for many of the Salish languages, such as Klallam, for an alveolar lateral ejective affricate [t͡ɬʼ].

== Encodings ==
Character information
Preview	Ƛ		ƛ	
Unicode name	LATIN CAPITAL LETTER LAMBDA WITH STROKE		LATIN SMALL LETTER LAMBDA WITH STROKE	
Encodings	decimal	hex	dec	hex
Unicode	42972	U+A7DC	411	U+019B
UTF-8	234 159 156	EA 9F 9C	198 155	C6 9B
Numeric character reference	&#42972;	&#xA7DC;	&#411;	&#x19B;
