= Voiced alveolar lateral affricate =

Consonantal sound

dɮ

𝼠
- IPA number: 104 + 149

Audio sample
- source · help

Encoding
- Entity (decimal): &#100;&#865;
- Unicode (hex): U+0064 U+0361
- X-SAMPA: dK\
Image

A voiced alveolar lateral affricate is a type of consonantal sound, used in some spoken languages. The symbol in the International Phonetic Alphabet is ⟨d͡ɮ⟩ (often simplified to ⟨dɮ⟩), and in Americanist phonetic notation it is ⟨λ⟩ (lambda). It is rarely a phoneme of its own, usually being in free variation with or an allophone of [ɮ], [t͡ɬ] or [l].

== Features ==
Features of a voiced alveolar lateral affricate:

- Its manner of articulation is affricate, which means it is produced by first stopping the airflow entirely, then allowing air flow through a constricted channel at the place of articulation, causing turbulence.
- Its place of articulation is alveolar, which means it is articulated with either the tip or the blade of the tongue at the alveolar ridge, termed respectively apical and laminal.
- Its phonation is voiced, which means the vocal cords vibrate during the articulation.
- It is an oral consonant, which means that air is not allowed to escape through the nose.
- It is a lateral consonant, which means it is produced by directing the airstream over the sides of the tongue, rather than down the middle.
- Its airstream mechanism is pulmonic, which means it is articulated by pushing air only with the intercostal muscles and abdominal muscles, as in most speech sounds.

== Occurrence ==
Voiced alveolar lateral affricates are rare. Sandawe has been transcribed with [dɮ], but the sound is more post-alveolar or palatal than alveolar. Consonants transcribed with ⟨dl⟩ in Athabaskan and Wakashan languages are often tenuis affricates [t͜ɬ] or have a lateral release [tˡ] or [dˡ], but some such as Chipewyan have a truly voiced affricate. In the Nguni languages [d͡ɮ] occurs after nasals: /nɮ̤/ is pronounced [nd͡ɮ̤], with an epenthetic stop, in at least Xhosa and Zulu.

Language		Word	IPA	Meaning	Notes
Arabic	Levantine	تدليل tadlil	[tæd͡ɮiːl]	'pampering'	Allophone of /dl/ in some speakers
Avá-Canoeiro	Tocantins	[ˌtaːˈpid͡ɮɐ]		'Tapirus terrestris'	Possible realisation of /l/. In the speech of people aged 40 to 80 years, the consonant is in free variation with [dl], [dʎ], [ʎ], [ɖ], [ɮ] and [l].
Cherokee		ᏜᎺᎭ dlameha	[d͡ɮaːmeːhá]	'bat'	Syllable onset and intervocalic allophone of /t͡ɬ/. See Cherokee phonology
Deg Xinag		sichidl	[sət͡ʃʰəd͡ɮ]	'my younger brother'	Syllable-final realization of /t͡ɬ/.
Hebrew		דלעת dlaʻat	[d͡ɮaʔat]	'gourd'	Allophone of /dl/ sequence in some speakers
Kamkata-viri	Kamviri dialect	uḍlʹoa-	[uˈdɮoː]	to drive away	Apical alveolar. Phonemically a sequence /ɖl/.
Xhosa		indlovu	[ind͡ɮ̤ɔːv̤u]	'elephant'	Allophone of /ɮ̤/ after /n/
Pa Na		[d͡ɮau˩˧]		'deep'	

== Bibliography ==
- Silva, Ariel Pheula do Couto e (2015). Elementos de fonologia, morfossintaxe e sintaxe da língua Avá-Canoeiro do Tocantins (Master's dissertation). University of Brasília. doi:10.26512/2015.03.D.18519.

Place →	Labial					Coronal										Dorsal					Laryngeal			
Manner ↓	Bilabial		Labiodental		Linguolabial		Dental		Alveolar		Postalveolar		Retroflex		(Alveolo-)palatal		Velar		Uvular		Pharyngeal/epiglottal		Glottal	
Nasal	m̥	m	ɱ̊	ɱ		n̼	n̪̊	n̪	n̥	n	n̠̊	n̠	ɳ̊	ɳ	ɲ̊	ɲ	ŋ̊	ŋ	ɴ̥	ɴ				
Plosive	p	b	p̪	b̪	t̼	d̼	t̪	d̪	t	d			ʈ	ɖ	c	ɟ	k	ɡ	q	ɢ	ʡ		ʔ	
Sibilant affricate							t̪s̪	d̪z̪	ts	dz	t̠ʃ	d̠ʒ	tʂ	dʐ	tɕ	dʑ								
Non-sibilant affricate	pɸ	bβ	p̪f	b̪v			t̪θ	d̪ð	tɹ̝̊	dɹ̝	t̠ɹ̠̊˔	d̠ɹ̠˔			cç	ɟʝ	kx	ɡɣ	qχ	ɢʁ	ʡʜ	ʡʢ	ʔh	
Sibilant fricative							s̪	z̪	s	z	ʃ	ʒ	ʂ	ʐ	ɕ	ʑ								
Non-sibilant fricative	ɸ	β	f	v	θ̼	ð̼	θ	ð	θ̠	ð̠	ɹ̠̊˔	ɹ̠˔	ɻ̊˔	ɻ˔	ç	ʝ	x	ɣ	χ	ʁ	ħ	ʕ	h	ɦ
Approximant		β̞		ʋ				ð̞		ɹ		ɹ̠		ɻ		j		ɰ						˷
Tap/flap		ⱱ̟		ⱱ					ɾ̥	ɾ			ɽ̊	ɽ						ɢ̆		ʡ̆		
Trill	ʙ̥	ʙ							r̥	r		r̠	ɽ̊r̥	ɽr					ʀ̥	ʀ	ʜ	ʢ		
Lateral affricate									tɬ	dɮ			tꞎ	d𝼅	c𝼆	ɟʎ̝	k𝼄	ɡʟ̝						
Lateral fricative							ɬ̪		ɬ	ɮ			ꞎ	𝼅	𝼆	ʎ̝	𝼄	ʟ̝						
Lateral approximant								l̪	l̥	l		l̠	ɭ̊	ɭ	ʎ̥	ʎ	ʟ̥	ʟ		ʟ̠				
Lateral tap/flap									ɺ̥	ɺ			𝼈̊	𝼈		ʎ̆		ʟ̆						

		BL	LD	D	A	PA	RF	P	V	U
Implosive	Voiced	ɓ			ɗ		ᶑ	ʄ	ɠ	ʛ
Implosive	Voiceless	ɓ̥			ɗ̥		ᶑ̊	ʄ̊	ɠ̊	ʛ̥
Ejective	Stop	pʼ			tʼ		ʈʼ	cʼ	kʼ	qʼ
Ejective	Affricate		p̪fʼ	tθʼ	tsʼ	tʃʼ	tʂʼ	tɕʼ	kxʼ	qχʼ
Ejective	Fricative	ɸʼ	fʼ	θʼ	sʼ	ʃʼ	ʂʼ	ɕʼ	xʼ	χʼ
Ejective	Lateral affricate				tɬʼ			c𝼆ʼ	k𝼄ʼ	q𝼄ʼ
Ejective	Lateral fricative				ɬʼ					
Click (top: velar; bottom: uvular)	Tenuis	kʘ qʘ		kǀ qǀ	kǃ qǃ		k𝼊 q𝼊	kǂ qǂ		
Click (top: velar; bottom: uvular)	Voiced	ɡʘ ɢʘ		ɡǀ ɢǀ	ɡǃ ɢǃ		ɡ𝼊 ɢ𝼊	ɡǂ ɢǂ		
Click (top: velar; bottom: uvular)	Nasal	ŋʘ ɴʘ		ŋǀ ɴǀ	ŋǃ ɴǃ		ŋ𝼊 ɴ𝼊	ŋǂ ɴǂ	ʞ	
Click (top: velar; bottom: uvular)	Tenuis lateral				kǁ qǁ					
Click (top: velar; bottom: uvular)	Voiced lateral				ɡǁ ɢǁ					
Click (top: velar; bottom: uvular)	Nasal lateral				ŋǁ ɴǁ					
