= Voiced pharyngeal fricative =

Consonantal sound represented by ⟨ʕ⟩ in IPA

ʕ
- IPA number: 145

Audio sample
- source · help

Encoding
- Entity (decimal): &#661;
- Unicode (hex): U+0295
- X-SAMPA: ?\
- Braille: ⠖ (braille pattern dots-235) ⠆ (braille pattern dots-23)
Image

Voiced pharyngeal approximant

ʕ̞

Audio sample
- source · help

Encoding
- X-SAMPA: ?\_o
Image

A voiced pharyngeal fricative or approximant is a type of consonantal sound, used in some spoken languages. The symbol in the International Phonetic Alphabet that represents this sound is ⟨ʕ⟩.

Although the official classification of manner for this sound in the IPA is a fricative, spectrographic and acoustic studies have found that it is most often realized as an approximant. The IPA symbol itself is ambiguous, as no language is known to make a phonemic distinction between voiced pharyngeal fricatives and approximants. For clarity, the approximant may be distinguished with the IPA diacritic for lowering, such as ⟨ʕ̞⟩.

In addition, laryngoscopic studies by phoneticians such as John Esling have shown the vowel [ɑ] to have distinct pharyngeal constriction and resonance in its articulation and quality, making [ʕ̞] the semivocalic equivalent of [ɑ]; this is reflected in the IPA's definition of the vowel's cardinal value. Esling furthers this notion in his expanded notation of the IPA chart; alongside merging pharyngeal and epiglottal consonants into a single column, he suggests that if it were spatially possible to align the vowel chart with the consonant chart, so that the relations between vowels and their semivowel counterparts are maintained (such as ⟨i⟩ below ⟨j⟩ and ⟨u⟩ below ⟨w⟩), then the vowels ⟨ɑ⟩ and ⟨ɒ⟩ should be placed under the combined pharyngeal/epiglottal column.

The IPA letter ⟨ʕ⟩ is caseless. The casing pair ⟨꟎꟏⟩ was added to Unicode in September 2025 with version 17.0.

== Features ==
Features of a voiced pharyngeal approximant fricative:

- Its manner of articulation varies between approximant and fricative, which means it is produced by narrowing the vocal tract at the place of articulation, but generally not enough to produce much turbulence in the airstream. Languages do not distinguish voiced fricatives from approximants produced in the throat.
- Its place of articulation is pharyngeal, which means it is articulated with the tongue root against the back of the throat (the pharynx).
- Its phonation is voiced, which means the vocal cords vibrate during the articulation.
- It is an oral consonant, which means that air is not allowed to escape through the nose.
- It is a median consonant, which means it is produced by directing the airstream down the midline of the tongue, rather than to the sides.
- Its airstream mechanism is pulmonic, which means it is articulated by pushing air only with the intercostal muscles and abdominal muscles, as in most speech sounds.

== Occurrence ==
Pharyngeal consonants are not widespread. Sometimes, a pharyngeal approximant develops from a uvular approximant. Many languages that have been described as having pharyngeal fricatives or approximants turn out on closer inspection to have epiglottal consonants instead. For example, the phoneme transcribed as ⟨ʕ⟩ for Arabic and standard Hebrew (though for most modern Hebrew speakers this has merged with a glottal stop) has been variously described as a voiced epiglottal fricative [ʢ], an epiglottal approximant [ʕ̞] (or [ʢ̞]), or a retracted tongue root glottal stop [ʔ̙].

Language		Word	IPA	Meaning	Notes
Abaza		гӏапынхъамыз/g'apynkh"amyz	[ʕaːpənqaːməz]	'March'	
Afar		damaqtu	[dʌmʌʕtu]	'male baboon'	
Arabic		العَرَبٍيٌَة/al-ʽarabiyya	[ælʕɑrɑˈbɪj.jæ]	'Arabic'	See Arabic phonology
Aramaic	Eastern	ܬܪܥܐ/tärʽa	[tʌrʕɑ]	'door'	The majority of the speakers will pronounce the word as [tʌrɑ].
Aramaic	Western	ܬܪܥܐ/tärʽa	[tʌrʕɔ]	'door'	
Avar		гӀоркь/ⱨorꝗ/ﻋﻮٰرڨ	[ʕortɬʼː]	'handle'	
Chechen		Ӏан/jan/ﻋﺂن	[ʕan]	'winter'	
Coeur d'Alene		stʕin	[stʕin]	'antelope'	
Danish	Standard	ravn	[ʕ̞ɑ̈wˀn]	'raven'	An approximant; also described as uvular [ʁ]. See Danish phonology
Dhao		[ʕaa]		'and'	Phonetic status is not clear, but it has "extremely limited distribution". It may not be pronounced at all or be realized as a glottal stop.
Dutch	Limburg	rad	[ʕ̞ɑt]	'wheel'	An approximant; a possible realization of /r/. Realization of /r/ varies considerably among dialects. See Dutch phonology
German	Some speakers	Mutter	[ˈmutɔʕ̞]	'mother'	An approximant; occurs in East Central Germany, Southwestern Germany, parts of Switzerland and in Tyrol. See Standard German phonology
German	Swabian dialect	ändard	[ˈend̥aʕ̞d̥]	'changes'	An approximant. It's an allophone of /ʁ/ in nucleus and coda positions; pronounced as a uvular approximant in onsets.
Hebrew	Iraqi	עִבְרִית/ʿivrît	[ʕibˈriːθ]	'Hebrew language'	Generally pronounced as a glottal stop or silent by most Israelis. See Modern Hebrew phonology
Hebrew	Sephardi	עִבְרִית/ʿivrît	[ʕivˈɾit]	'Hebrew language'	Generally pronounced as a glottal stop or silent by most Israelis. See Modern Hebrew phonology
Hebrew	Yemenite	עִבְרִית/ʿivrît	[ʕivˈriːθ]	'Hebrew language'	Generally pronounced as a glottal stop or silent by most Israelis. See Modern Hebrew phonology
Ingush		ӏаддал	[ʕaddal]	'Archer'	
Judeo-Spanish	Haketia	Maˁarab	[maʕa'ɾaβ]	'Morocco'	Only appears in Hebrew and Arabic loanwords.
Judeo-Spanish	Jerusalem	ʕasker	[ʕasˈkeɾ]	‘army’	Only appears in Hebrew and Arabic loanwords.
Kabyle		ɛemmi	[ʕəmːi]	'my (paternal) uncle'	
Kurdish	Kurmanji	ewr/'ewr	[ʕɜwr]	'cloud'	The sound is usually not written in the Latin alphabet, but ⟨'⟩ can be used.
Khalaj	Standard	yâan	[jɑːɑ̯n]	'side'	
Luwati		ﻗﻠﻌﺔ	[qilʕa]	'castle'	Used in Arabic loanwords
Malay	Kedah	باﮐﺮ/bakar	[ba.kaʕ]	'to burn'	Corresponds to word-final /r/ in Standard Malay. Could be voiced velar fricative [ɣ] for some speakers. Prevocalically and intervocalically, Standard Malay /r/ corresponds to /ʁ/ in Kedah Malay. See Kedah Malay
Maltese		għada	[ʕada]	'tomorrow'	
Mehri		ﻋﻴﻦ/ʾāyn	[ʕajn]	'eye'	
Nuu-chah-nulth		ʕiiniƛ	[ʕiːnitɬ]	'dog'	May be a plosive /ʡ/
Occitan	Southern Auvergnat	pala	[ˈpaʕa]	'shovel'	See Occitan phonology
Okanagan		ʕaymt	[ʕajmt]	'angry'	
Pilagá		awoʕoik	[awoʕoik]	'moon'	See Pilagá phonology
Tarifit		ⵄⵉⵏⵉ/ɛini	[ʕini]	'probably'	See Tarifit phonology
Salish		ʕámt	[ʕamt]	'it's melted'	
Shehri		ﭘﻌﺐ/śaʿb	[ɬaʕb]	'valley'	See Shehri phonology
Stoney	Mînî Thnî	marazuch	[mɑˈʕ̞ɑʒut͡ɕ]	'It is raining.'	Usually realized as a pharyngeal approximant, but may become an epiglottal trill [ʢ] on stressed syllables.
Somali		𐒋𐒛𐒒𐒙/caano	[ʕaːno]	'milk'	See Somali phonology
Soqotri		أَﻋْﺮٞب/áˁreb	[aʕreb]	'raven'	See Soqotri phonology
U			[saχɔ̌ʕ]	'tree bark'	Corresponded to proto-Palaungic */k/ or open back vowel */ɔʔ/.

== See also ==
- Modifier letter left half ring
- Index of phonetics articles
- Voiced uvular fricative
- Glottal stop
- Ayin

== General references ==
- Basbøll, Hans (2005), The Phonology of Danish, Taylor & Francis, ISBN 0-203-97876-5
- Bonafont, Door Rosa (2006), Guia de conversa universitaria amazic-catala/Tamazight-Takatalant amalal usiwel asdawan, University of Barcelona, ISBN 9788447531141
- Collins, Beverley; Mees, Inger M. (2003) [First published 1981], The Phonetics of English and Dutch (5th ed.), Leiden: Brill Publishers, ISBN 9004103406
- Danylenko, Andrii; Vakulenko, Serhii (1995), Ukrainian, Lincom Europa, ISBN 9783929075083
- Dudenredaktion; Kleiner, Stefan; Knöbl, Ralf (2015) [First published 1962], Das Aussprachewörterbuch (in German) (7th ed.), Berlin: Dudenverlag, ISBN 978-3-411-04067-4
- International Phonetic Association (1999), Handbook of the International Phonetic Association: A Guide to the Use of the International Phonetic Alphabet, Cambridge University Press, ISBN 0-52163751-1
- Ladefoged, Peter; Maddieson, Ian (1996). The Sounds of the World's Languages. Oxford: Blackwell. ISBN 0-631-19815-6.
- Thelwall, Robin (1990), "Arabic", Journal of the International Phonetic Association, 20 (2): 37–41, doi:10.1017/S0025100300004266, S2CID 243640727

Place →	Labial					Coronal										Dorsal					Laryngeal			
Manner ↓	Bilabial		Labiodental		Linguolabial		Dental		Alveolar		Postalveolar		Retroflex		(Alveolo-)palatal		Velar		Uvular		Pharyngeal/epiglottal		Glottal	
Nasal	m̥	m	ɱ̊	ɱ		n̼	n̪̊	n̪	n̥	n	n̠̊	n̠	ɳ̊	ɳ	ɲ̊	ɲ	ŋ̊	ŋ	ɴ̥	ɴ				
Plosive	p	b	p̪	b̪	t̼	d̼	t̪	d̪	t	d			ʈ	ɖ	c	ɟ	k	ɡ	q	ɢ	ʡ		ʔ	
Sibilant affricate							t̪s̪	d̪z̪	ts	dz	t̠ʃ	d̠ʒ	tʂ	dʐ	tɕ	dʑ								
Non-sibilant affricate	pɸ	bβ	p̪f	b̪v			t̪θ	d̪ð	tɹ̝̊	dɹ̝	t̠ɹ̠̊˔	d̠ɹ̠˔			cç	ɟʝ	kx	ɡɣ	qχ	ɢʁ	ʡʜ	ʡʢ	ʔh	
Sibilant fricative							s̪	z̪	s	z	ʃ	ʒ	ʂ	ʐ	ɕ	ʑ								
Non-sibilant fricative	ɸ	β	f	v	θ̼	ð̼	θ	ð	θ̠	ð̠	ɹ̠̊˔	ɹ̠˔	ɻ̊˔	ɻ˔	ç	ʝ	x	ɣ	χ	ʁ	ħ	ʕ	h	ɦ
Approximant		β̞		ʋ				ð̞		ɹ		ɹ̠		ɻ		j		ɰ						˷
Tap/flap		ⱱ̟		ⱱ					ɾ̥	ɾ			ɽ̊	ɽ						ɢ̆		ʡ̆		
Trill	ʙ̥	ʙ							r̥	r		r̠	ɽ̊r̥	ɽr					ʀ̥	ʀ	ʜ	ʢ		
Lateral affricate									tɬ	dɮ			tꞎ	d𝼅	c𝼆	ɟʎ̝	k𝼄	ɡʟ̝						
Lateral fricative							ɬ̪		ɬ	ɮ			ꞎ	𝼅	𝼆	ʎ̝	𝼄	ʟ̝						
Lateral approximant								l̪	l̥	l		l̠	ɭ̊	ɭ	ʎ̥	ʎ	ʟ̥	ʟ		ʟ̠				
Lateral tap/flap									ɺ̥	ɺ			𝼈̊	𝼈		ʎ̆		ʟ̆						

		BL	LD	D	A	PA	RF	P	V	U
Implosive	Voiced	ɓ			ɗ		ᶑ	ʄ	ɠ	ʛ
Implosive	Voiceless	ɓ̥			ɗ̥		ᶑ̊	ʄ̊	ɠ̊	ʛ̥
Ejective	Stop	pʼ			tʼ		ʈʼ	cʼ	kʼ	qʼ
Ejective	Affricate		p̪fʼ	tθʼ	tsʼ	tʃʼ	tʂʼ	tɕʼ	kxʼ	qχʼ
Ejective	Fricative	ɸʼ	fʼ	θʼ	sʼ	ʃʼ	ʂʼ	ɕʼ	xʼ	χʼ
Ejective	Lateral affricate				tɬʼ			c𝼆ʼ	k𝼄ʼ	q𝼄ʼ
Ejective	Lateral fricative				ɬʼ					
Click (top: velar; bottom: uvular)	Tenuis	kʘ qʘ		kǀ qǀ	kǃ qǃ		k𝼊 q𝼊	kǂ qǂ		
Click (top: velar; bottom: uvular)	Voiced	ɡʘ ɢʘ		ɡǀ ɢǀ	ɡǃ ɢǃ		ɡ𝼊 ɢ𝼊	ɡǂ ɢǂ		
Click (top: velar; bottom: uvular)	Nasal	ŋʘ ɴʘ		ŋǀ ɴǀ	ŋǃ ɴǃ		ŋ𝼊 ɴ𝼊	ŋǂ ɴǂ	ʞ	
Click (top: velar; bottom: uvular)	Tenuis lateral				kǁ qǁ					
Click (top: velar; bottom: uvular)	Voiced lateral				ɡǁ ɢǁ					
Click (top: velar; bottom: uvular)	Nasal lateral				ŋǁ ɴǁ					
