= Wakashan languages =

Native American language family

Wakashan
- Geographic distribution: British Columbia, Canada
- Linguistic classification: One of the world's primary language families
- Subdivisions: Northern; Southern

Language codes
- ISO 639-2 / 5: wak
- Glottolog: waka1280
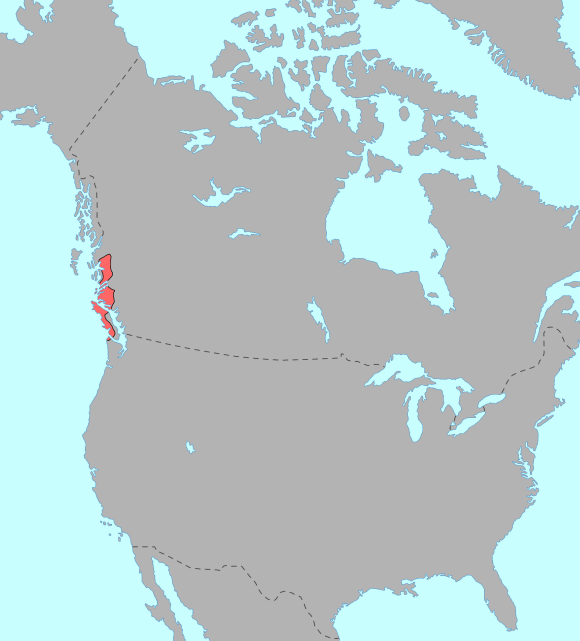
- Pre-contact distribution of Wakashan languages

Detailed map of pre-contact distribution of the Wakashan languages.

Wakashan is a family of languages spoken in British Columbia around and on Vancouver Island, and in the northwestern corner of the Olympic Peninsula of Washington state, on the south side of the Strait of Juan de Fuca.

As is typical of the Northwest Coast, Wakashan languages have large consonant inventories—the consonants often occurring in complex clusters.

== Classification ==
=== Family division ===
The Wakashan language family consists of seven languages:

- Wakashan
  - Northern Wakashan (Kwakiutlan) languages
    - Haisla (also known as Xaʼislak'ala, X̌àh̓isl̩ak̓ala or Haisla-Henaksiala, with two dialects, spoken by the Haisla) – about 200 speakers (2005)
      - C̓imo'c̓a/Cʼimaucʼa (Kitimaat/Kitamat) - X̄a'islak̓ala dialect (spoken by the Haisla/x̣àʼisəla)
      - Gitlo'p (Kitlope) - X̄enaksialak̓ala dialect (spoken by the Henaaksiala/X̄enaksiala)
    - Kwak'wala (also known as Kwakiutl and Lekwala / Liq̓ʷala, with four dialects, spoken by and Kwakwaka'wakw or Northern Kwakiutl and the Laich-kwil-tach or Southern Kwakiutl) – 235 speakers (2000)
      - Northern Kwakiutl or Kwak'wala
        - G̱ut̕sala / G̱uc̓ala / Quatsino Sound dialect (Bands of Quatsino Sound, today by the Gwa'sala people from Smiths Inlet and the 'Nakwaxda'xw people from Blunden Harbour)
        - Kwak̕wala / Kwaḵ̓wala dialect (Bands of Gilford Island, Knight Inlet, Kwakiutl, Nimpkish, Alert Bay, Kincome Inlet)
        - 'Nak̕wala / Bak̓wa̱mk̓ala dialect (also known as Northern Kwak̓wala dialect, spoken by the Northern Bands or 'Nak̕waxda'x̱w and Gwa'sa̱la peoples)
          - Gwa’cala subdialect
          - ‘Na‘kwala subdialect
        - T̕łat̕łasik̕wala / Nahwitti dialect (Bands of today's T̕łat̕łasiḵ̕wala people on Hope Island)
      - Southern Kwakiutl
        - Lekwala / Liq̓ʷala / Lekwiltok dialect (Bands of the Laich-kwil-tach (Lekwiltok), they were oft called Southern Kwakiutl but identify as a separate people from the Kwakwaka'wakw and their dialect is sometimes considered a separate language)
    - Heiltsuk-Oowekyala (also known as Bella Bella) – about 200 speakers (2005)
      - Heiltsuk dialect (also known as Bella Bella and Haihais, Haiɫzaqvla, Haíɫzaqv/Híɫzaqvḷa, with two subdialects, spoken by the Heiltsuk people, once incorrectly known as the Northern Kwakiutl)
        - Haíɫzaqv/Híɫzaqvḷa or Bella Bella (Wágḷísḷa) subdialect (spoken by the Heiltsuk (Haíɫzaqv / Híɫzaqv) in Bella Bella)
        - X̌íx̌íc̓ala/Haihais or Klemtu (Ɫṃ́du̓ax̌sṃ) subdialect (spoken by the X̌íx̌ís (Xixis / Xai’xais / Haihais) in Klemtu)
      - Oowekyala dialect or ’Wuik̓ala dialect (also known as 'Uik'ala, Ooweekeeno, Wuikala, Wuikenukv, Oweekeno, Wikeno, Owikeno, Oweekano, Awikenox, Oowek'yala, Oweek'ala) (spoken by the Wuikinuxv (Oowekeeno or Rivers Inlet) People, once incorrectly known as the Northern Kwakiutl)
  - Southern Wakashan (Nootkan) languages
    - Nuu-chah-nulth (also known as Nuučaan̓uł, Nootka, Nutka, Aht, West Coast, T'aat'aaqsapa, spoken by the Nuu-chah-nulth, 12 different dialects) – 510 speakers (2005)
    - Nitinaht or Ditidaqiic̓aq Cicqiʔ (also known as Diidiitidq, Diitiidʔaatx̣, Nitinat, Ditidaht, Southern Nootkan, spoken by the Ditidaht or Southern Nootka, Pacheedaht, and Ts'uubaa-asatx (Lake Cowichan), located in southwestern Vancouver Island – 30 speakers (1991)
      - Ditidaqiic̓aq Cicqiʔ or DiiɁdiitidq/Diidiitidq dialect (spoken by the Ditidaht (Diitiid7aa7tx / Diitiidʔaaʔtx̣) - "People of Diitiidaʔ" or "People along the Diitiidaʔ, i.e. Jordan River")
      - Pacheedaht dialect (once spoken by the Pacheedaht (P'a:chi:da / P’a:chi:da?-aht) - "People of the Sea Foam" or "People along the San Juan River")
      - Ts'uubaa-asatx dialect (once spoken by the Lake Cowichan (Ts'uubaa-asatx) - "People of the Lake, i.e. Cowichan Lake")
    - †Makah (also known as Qʷi·qʷi·diččaq, Q'widishch'a:'tx, spoken by the Makah together with the now extinct Ozette people) – Last fluent speaker, where it was their first language, died in 2002
      - Qʷi·qʷi·diččaq/Q'widishch'a:'tx or Makah dialect (spoken by the Makah (Kwih-dich-chuh-ahtx (Qʷidiččaʔa·tx̌) - "People who live by the rocks and seagulls")
      - 'Osi:l-'a:'tx/ʔuseeʔłaʔtx̣ or Ozette village dialect (once spoken by the Ozette people (Osi:l-'a:'tx/ʔuseeʔłaʔtx̣ - "People of ʔuseeʔł, i.e. Ozette Village")

=== Possible relations to external language families ===
As first proposed by Edward Sapir and Leo J. Frachtenberg, and later elaborated by Morris Swadesh, the Wakashan languages were grouped together with Salishan and Chimakuan languages in a "Mosan" macrofamily. This proposed macrofamily is now generally rejected as a genealogical grouping. Structural similarities and shared vocabulary are best explained as the result of continuous intensive contact; the Mosan languages thus represent a sprachbund within the wider Pacific Northwest typological area.

In the 1960s, Swadesh also suggested a connection of the Wakashan languages with the Eskimo–Aleut languages. This was picked up and expanded by Holst (2005).

Sergei Nikolaev has argued in two papers for a systematic relationship between the Nivkh language of Sakhalin island and the Amur river basin and the Algic languages, and a secondary relationship between these two together and the Wakashan languages.

== Name and contact ==
The name Wakesh or Waukash originates from the Nuu-chah-nulth word for 'good'. It was used by early explorers including Captain James Cook, who thought it to be the tribal appellation.

Juan de Fuca was probably the first European to meet Wakashan-speaking peoples, and Juan Perez visited the Nuu-chah-nulth people in 1774. After 1786, English mariners frequently sailed to Nootka Sound; in 1803, almost all the crew of the American ship Boston were killed by the local natives.

In 1843 the Hudson's Bay Company established a trading post at Victoria. European-Canadians had regular contact with the First Nations after that time. There were dramatic population losses in the early 20th century due to smallpox epidemics (because the First Nations had no acquired immunity to the new disease), social disruption, and alcoholism. In 1903 the Aboriginals numbered about 5200, of whom 2600 were in the West Coast Agency, 1300 in the Kwawkewlth Agency, 900 in the North West Coast Agency, and 410 at Neah Bay Company, Cape Flattery. In 1909 they numbered 4584, including 2070 Kwakiutl and 2494 Nootka. Roman Catholic missionaries were active in the region.

The name "Wakish Nation" is featured in Arrowsmith's Oregon Dispute-era map as the name for Vancouver Island.
