= Gʼpsgolox totem pole =

- Gʼpsgolox pole on the yard of the Ethnographic department of The Swedish Royal Museum in the city of Stockholm, 1929.
- Material: Red cedar
- Size: Height: 900 centimetres (30 ft)
- Created: 1872 by Haisla people, British Columbia
- Present location: Misʼkusa (1872-1929), Stockholm (1929-2006), Kitamaat Village (2006-2012), Kimano, Kitlope valley (2012-)

The Gʼpsgolox totem pole was a nine-metre-high mortuary pole that was made in 1872 by the Haisla people on the shore of Douglas Channel in British Columbia, Canada. In 1929 it was brought to Sweden and the Museum of Ethnography. In 2006 it was returned to the Haisla people. In 2012 it was allowed to decompose, in accordance with the Haisla tradition for long-serving poles.

== History and legend ==
The Gʼpsgolox totem pole is attached with a legend. It is told that, in 1872, a smallpox epidemic infected the people the Haisla Nation (located in the north of what is now called British Columbia), killing the vast majority of inhabitants. The leader of the Eagle Clan of the Haisla tribe, named Chief Gʼpsgolox, lost his whole family due to the epidemic, as well as many of his friends. The legend tells that the bereaved Chief Gʼpsgolox travelled to the forest and attempted to find help there. In the legend, he met with the spirits Tsooda and Zola, who told the chief to go to the edge of a mountain at dawn, where he would see his deceased loved ones and learn to heal those still living. In the legend, this is how Chief Gʼpsgolox complied and gained vital knowledge, learning the nature of the spirits, the Haisla spirit of continuance and transition. In appreciation of the spirits' help, Chief Gʼpsgolox commissioned a nine-metre-tall totem pole with three figures. The bottom two figures commemorate the deceased and the top figure represents the Tsooda spirit. The pole, while commemorating the dead, told the tale of Haisla survival.

== Pole brought to Sweden ==
In 1928 Olof Hanson, the Swedish vice-president to British Columbia, submitted a request to the Canadian Department of Indian Affairs to acquire a pole, and in 1929 Hanson was granted permission to cut down a totem pole and take it to Sweden. Hanson chose the Gʼpsgolox totem pole and cut it at the base. Hanson took the pole while the Haisla were away due to seasonal living patterns, leaving the Haisla confused and wondering what had happened to the pole. The Norwegian emigrant named Iver Fougner (1870—1947) who chopped down the pole was employed as an Indian agent. He was a contact person between the authorities and Indigenous peoples in the vast district. Hanson donated the G’psgolox Pole to the Swedish National Museum of Ethnography that same year. The museum had the pole in storage for many years until they had a proper building to display it in 1980. The pole was on display in this building for 25 years.

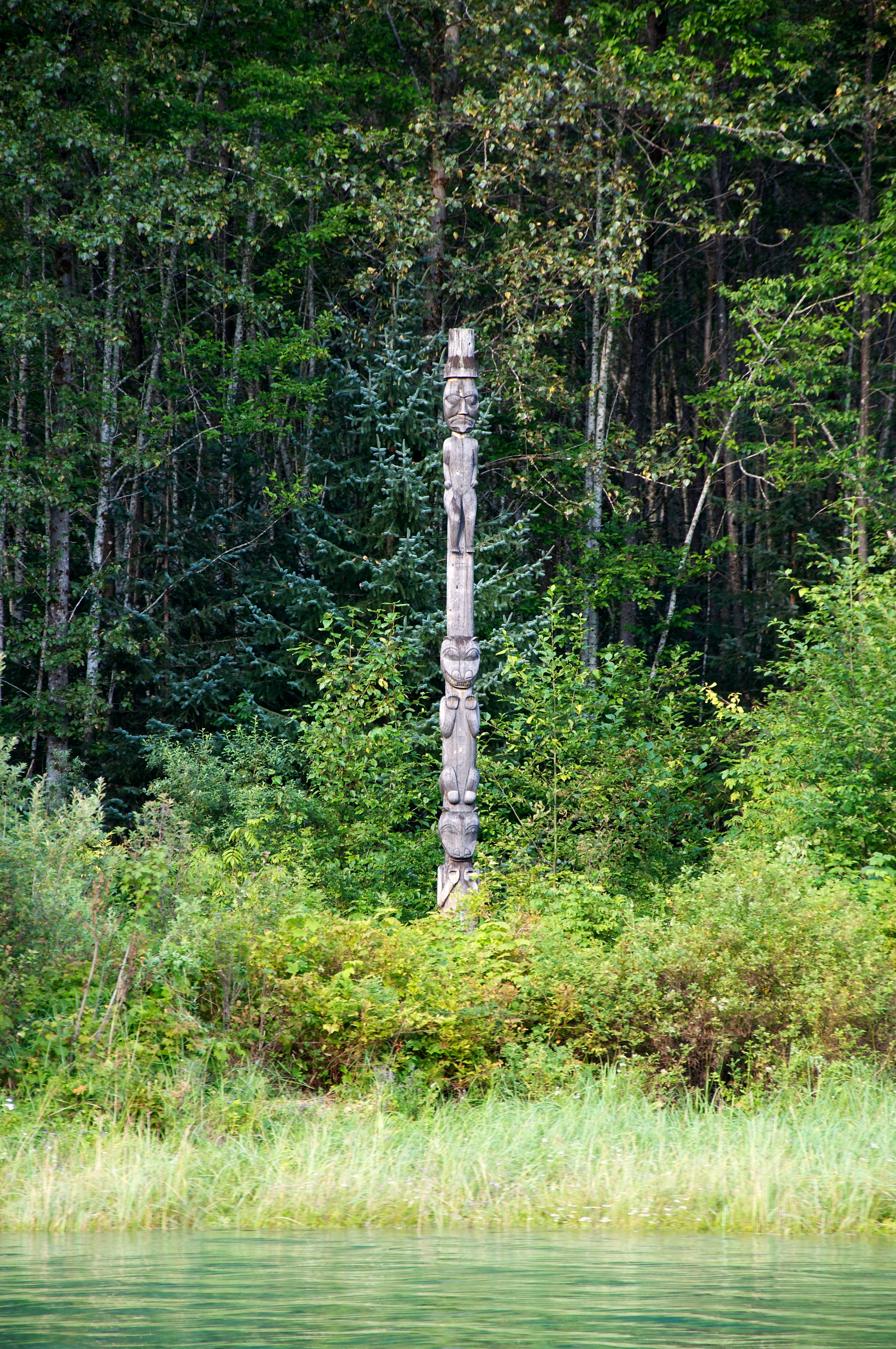
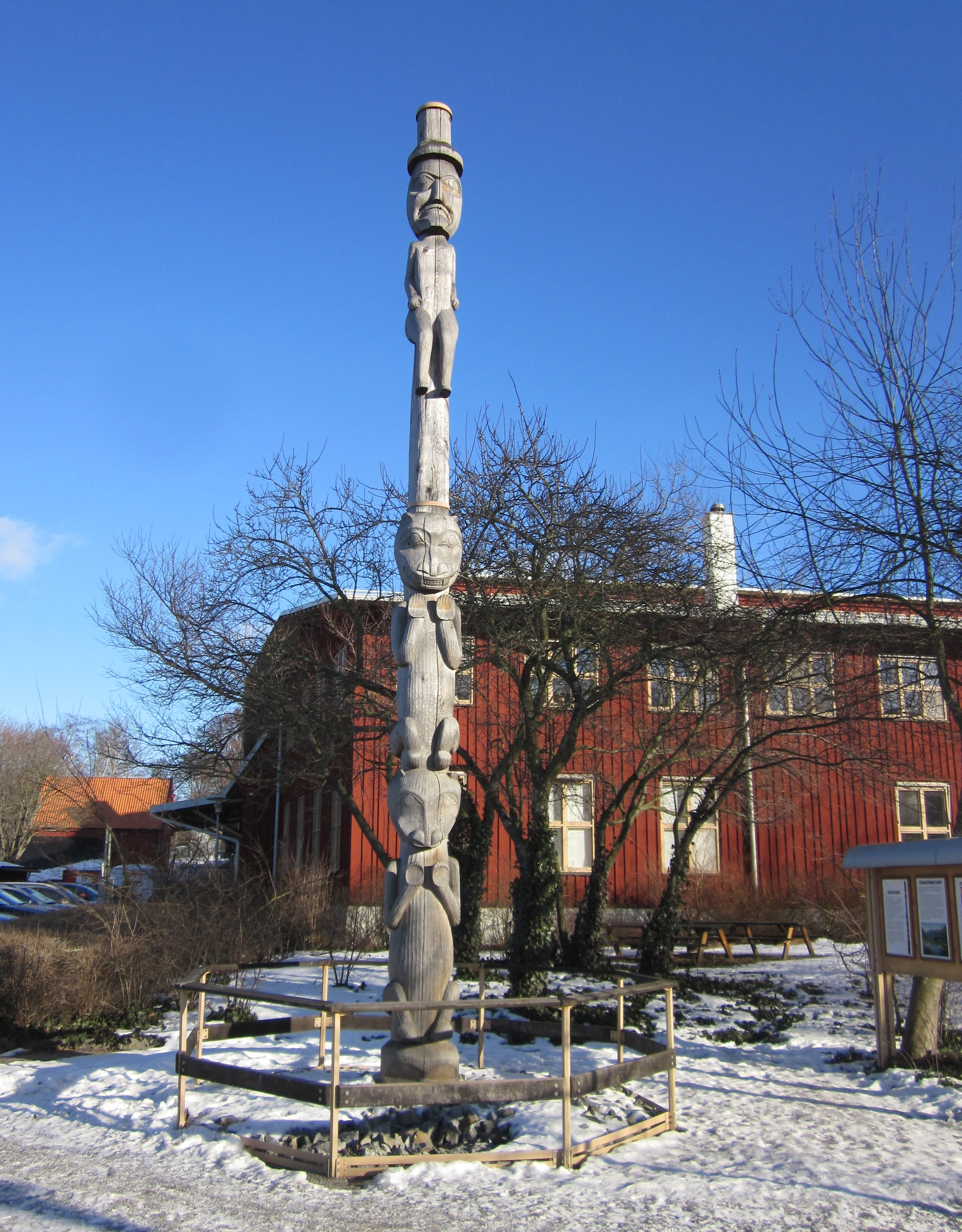
Two replicas of the pole carved by Henry Robertson and the Wilson brothers. The left one was erected in 2000 in Misʼkusa, the right one was erected outside the Museum of Ethnography, Stockholm, in 2006.

== Claims for repatriation ==
When some members of the Haisla Nation heard rumours that the pole may have been up for display in Sweden, it was decided that Louisa Smith and Gerald Amos should travel to Sweden to investigate the rumours. Once they had confirmed that the pole in display was the G’psgolox Pole, the Haisla nation asked for its repatriation. In 1992, a member of the Museum of Ethnography travelled to the Haisla village in British Columbia, where he was told by the Haisla people that the pole was stolen from them and that they had been avidly searching for it without success since the theft in 1929. He was also told that, since the pole was found, it had to be returned to its rightful owners. The Haisla people offered to carve an identical totem replica in exchange for the original. The museum agreed to the proposal by the Haisla people. This led to the Swedish government granting permission for the museum to gift the totem pole to the Haisla people in 1994, with the condition that the replica be an exact match to the original. In 2000, the Haisla community completed two replicas of the pole. One of the replicas were given to Sweden, while the other was placed where the G’psgolox Pole once stood. The poles were carved by Henry Robertson and his sister's sons Derek and Barry Wilson. The Haisla nation also built a historical preservation centre in the Kitimaat Village that would host the original pole.

== The return of the pole ==
In 2006, after 77 years at the museum, the pole arrived at the Kitamaat Village in British Columbia. In the shopping mall where it was placed, school children could listen to the elders telling the history of the pole. In 2012, the Kitlope Eagle clan chief decided to move the pole to an old graveyard close to the original location of the pole, where it was left to disintegrate.

== See also ==
- List of totem poles
- Ni'isjoohl totem pole
