= Haisla =

Haisla may refer to:

- Haisla people, an indigenous people living in Kitamaat, British Columbia, Canada.
- Haisla language, their northern Wakashan language.
- Haisla Nation, a First Nations band government in British Columbia, Canada.
