= Monkey Beach (film) =

2020 drama film

- Film poster
- Directed by: Loretta Todd
- Written by: Johnny Darrell; Andrew Duncan; Loretta Todd
- Based on: Monkey Beach by Eden Robinson
- Produced by: Loretta Todd; Patti Poskitt; Jason James; Matthew O'Connor; Lisa Richardson
- Starring: Grace Dove; Adam Beach; Nathaniel Arcand; Glen Gould
- Cinematography: Stirling Bancroft
- Edited by: Asim Nurany; Fredrik Thorsen
- Music by: Jesse Zubot Russell Wallace,
- Production companies: Mama-oo Productions; Reunion Pacific Entertainment
- Release date: 24 September 2020 (VIFF)
- Running time: 103 minutes
- Country: Canada
- Languages: English; Haisla

Monkey Beach is a 2020 Canadian drama film, directed by Loretta Todd. Her debut narrative feature, the film is an adaptation of Eden Robinson's 2000 novel Monkey Beach.

The film stars Grace Dove as Lisamarie, a young Haisla woman in Kitamaat, British Columbia coming to terms with the mysterious disappearance of her brother Jimmy (Joel Oulette). The film's cast also includes Adam Beach, Nathaniel Arcand, Glen Gould, Tina Lameman and Ta'Kaiya Blaney.

The film premiered at the 2020 Vancouver International Film Festival.

== Critical response ==
For The Georgia Straight, Craig Takeuchi wrote that "Although the overall effort may be uneven at times and takes some time to find its way, there’s enough to appreciate here to carry things along, including a scene-stealing Adam Beach as the mischievous Uncle Mick, Lisa’s struggle to reconcile traditional values with the current world, and—needless to say—the evocative setting that pervades the proceedings."

For the Hollywood North Magazine, Shaun Lang wrote, "If my plot summary sounds vague, it’s merely in the service of not spoiling one of the shiniest jewels in the recent wave of Canadian Indigenous Cinema. If The Grizzlies was the Inuit answer to the sports drama, then Monkey Beach is the Haisla response to the Superhero genre. That’s about the closest I can come to categorizing what is truly a spiritually-healing experience whether you’re Haisla or otherwise."

== Awards ==
The film swept the feature film awards at the 2020 American Indian Film Festival, winning for Best Picture, Best Director (Todd), Best Actor (Beach), Best Actress (Dove), Best Supporting Actor (Arcand) and Best Supporting Actress (Lameman). At the Vancouver Film Critics Circle Awards 2020, Beach was nominated for Best Supporting Actor in a Canadian Film and Lameman was nominated for Best Supporting Actress in a Canadian Film.

Todd, Johnny Darrell and Andrew Duncan received a Canadian Screen Award nomination for Best Adapted Screenplay at the 9th Canadian Screen Awards in 2021.
