= Celu (disambiguation) =

Celu or CELU may refer to:

- Certificate of Use of Language in Spanish (CELU), a language exam in Argentina
- Confederation of Ethiopian Labor Unions (CELU)
- Celu Amberstone (born 1947), a Canadian author
- Çelu, an EP by Elvana Gjata
