= Snotty Nose Rez Kids =

First Nations hip-hop duo

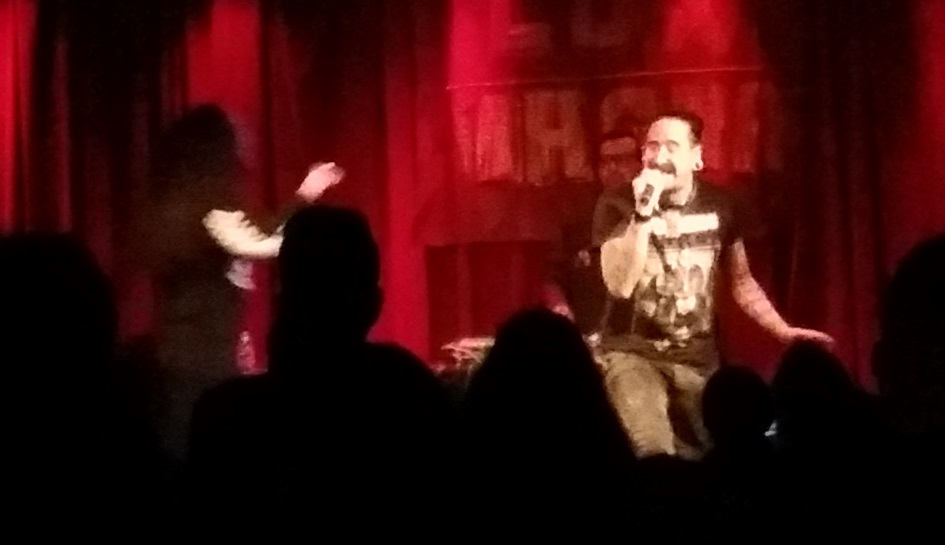

Background information
- Origin: Kitimaat Village, British Columbia, Canada
- Genres: Indigenous hip-hop; hip-hop
- Years active: 2016–present
- Labels: Distorted Muse; Sony
- Members: Darren "Young D" Metz; Quinton "Yung Trybez" Nyce

Snotty Nose Rez Kids, sometimes referred to as SNRK, are a First Nations hip-hop duo composed of Haisla rappers Darren "Young D" Metz and Quinton "Yung Trybez" Nyce. They are originally from Kitamaat Village, British Columbia. Their 2017 album The Average Savage was shortlisted for the 2018 Polaris Music Prize, and for the Juno Award for Indigenous Music Album of the Year at the Juno Awards of 2019. In 2018, the duo received nominations for Best Hip Hop Album at the Indigenous Music Awards, and for Indigenous Artist of the Year at the Western Canadian Music Awards. Ever since their second release, The Average Savage, all of their albums have been long- or shortlisted for the Polaris Music Prize.

== Background and early life ==
“Young D” and “Yung Trybez” grew up five houses apart on the reservation and played basketball together. Their community was family-oriented; Nyce was adopted at birth and raised by a large extended family. Their families practiced Haisla traditions that are apparent in the duo’s lyrics. Metz was raised by his grandparents, both musicians; his grandfather played guitar, and his grandmother played piano and accordion, and was surrounded by music from an early age. Dr. Dre, Snoop Dogg, and E-40 are the pairs biggest hip-hop influences; however they decided on the name “Snotty Nose Rez Kids” to communicate a sense of pride through the rough language and reclaim it for the Haisla Nation.

== Career ==
Metz and Nyce first connected as writers during high school - Metz wrote poetry and Nyce was a storyteller - realizing they both had a love of hip-hop. The two started recording together under the name Minay Music for a project Metz was assigned during his audio engineering program at Harbourside Institute of Technology.

The duo released their self-titled debut album in January 2017, and followed up with The Average Savage in September. The Average Savage was also influenced by a greater driving factor, grief. Nyce (“Yung Trybez”) lost his brother to suicide before recording. This album was not only Nyce's way of processing his grief but mixing the grief with humor set the tone for how the Snotty Nose Rez Kids would handle sensitive subjects in the future.Their single "Skoden" was playlisted on CBC Music's Reclaimed, and was named one of the year's 100 best songs by the network. The song received renewed attention in 2018 when a graffiti artist spray painted "Skoden" on the water tower in downtown Sudbury. The word "Skoden" is a phrase that means "let's go then", and has been a long-standing popular phrase in Indigenous circles.

In May 2018, they released the new single "The Warriors", a protest song opposing the Trans Mountain Pipeline, and signed to Jarrett Martineau's RPM Records. After a brief stint with RPM, Snotty Nose Rez Kids decided to part ways and release their next album independently. Their third album, TRAPLINE, was released on May 10, 2019. In June 2019, TRAPLINE was shortlisted for the 2019 Polaris Music Prize. Exclaim! named the album the 7th best hip-hop album of the year. TRAPLINE is also centered on themes that are driven toward Indigenous history, the environment and women.

In 2020, the duo announced that they would releasing the EP Born Deadly on April 3. The EP was preceded by two singles: "Real Deadly" and "Cops with Guns Are the Worst!!!".

In 2021, the duo released their fourth album Life After, which was later shortlisted for the 2022 Polaris Music Prize. Released right after the Covid-19 pandemic, the Life After album is a reflection of how the duo processed the grief of the period as well as the intentionality and resilience needed for the community to move forward. In 2022, they released their fifth album I'M GOOD, HBU?, which was shortlisted for the 2023 Polaris Music Prize. The album artwork, created by Canadian artist Pencil Fingerz, was nominated for Album Artwork of the Year at the Juno Awards.

In 2023, the duo signed with Sony Music Canada and their video for "Damn Right", directed by Sterling Larose, won the Prism Prize.

In 2024, CBC Television announced that the duo were slated to star in an eponymous comedy television series, playing fictionalized versions of themselves prior to their rise to fame, which was slated to premiere in the 2024-25 television season. In April 2025, the CBC and APTN announced that they were pulling out of the series, citing "creative, logistical and financial factors".

On September 18, 2024, they released their sixth album, Red Future (stylized in capital letters), their first under the Sony Music Canada label. Metz and Nyce have described the album as being rooted in Indigenous futurism. The seven generations idea is also rooted in the album which envisions Indigenous lives in seven generations: in hopes of preserving land and culture to the best of their abilities. A First Nations pregnant woman makes up the album's artwork which also addresses the significance of women to Haisla Nation and the importance of their future. The album was the first they recorded in their own studio, which they subsequently lost in a fire some months later.

Red Future has received critical praise, being described as "the most clearly focused record of SNRK's career." The album includes musical contributions from Aysanabee, Travis Thompson, Drezus, and Rueben George.

It won the Juno Award for Rap Album of the Year at the Juno Awards of 2025, making them the first Indigenous artists to do so. Red Future was also longlisted for the 2025 Polaris Music Prize.

== Musical themes ==
Identity, indigenous futurism, and representation are the key themes in Snotty Nose Rez Kids Music. The music is a blend between West Coast hip-hop lyricism and trap production. The Snotty Nose Rez Kids have taken direct stereotypes from old documentaries and cartoons with savagely depicted Native Americans and confronted/deconstructed them in their music. Actual Indigenous music is seen in their songs such as “Skoden” that has a sample from Indigenous artist Beau Dick. Humor is intentionally integrated through the duo's music to make the messages more easily digestible for all audiences.

Furthermore, the idea of Indigenous futurism, most present in the Red Future album has been a key role in changing the impression that Indigenous media has to be about a sad idea but can be about an empowering one. For example, in the song Red Future the lyrics explore not only ideas of empowerment but ideas of honoring the past and respecting what has happened. The Snotty Nose Rez kids create a new reality and expectation of Indigenous presence in the future, present, and past. When asked about the albums, Metz and Nyce have described them as reflecting the climates socially and politically of certain cultural moments.

== Cultural impact ==
The duo's impact on culture in general has also been significant. Through their touring of North America, the UK, the Netherlands, Mexico, and Australia, Metz and Nyce have been able to reach diverse international audiences. They have also been able to touch audiences at sports events like in Toronto Raptors, Toronto Maple Leafs, and Vancouver Canucks games. Furthermore, at the Juno Awards, the Snotty Nose Rez kids performed with Tia Wood who is a member of the Saddle Lake Cree Nation, which allowed them to blend contemporary and traditional music and ideas on national television. The Juno award win of the Snotty Nose Rez kids was also historic for Indigenous artists worldwide.

== Discography ==
=== Albums ===
- Snotty Nose Rez Kids (2017)
- The Average Savage (2017)
- TRAPLINE (2019)
- Life After (2021)
- I’M GOOD, HBU? (2022)
- RED FUTURE (2024)

=== EPs ===
- Born Deadly (2020)

=== Singles ===
- "The Warriors" (2018)
- "Homeland" ft. Mob Bounce (2018)
- "Creator Made an Animal" ft. Boslen (2019)
- "I Can't Remember My Name" ft. Shanks Sioux (2019)
- "Real Deadly" (2020)
- "Cops with Guns Are the Worst!!!" (2020)
- "Red Future" ft. Electric Fields (2024)
- "DUMB" ft. SonReal (2025)

=== Compilation albums ===
- Tiny House Warriors (2018)
