= Carla Robinson =

Canadian television journalist

Carla Robinson (born 23 January 1971 in Kitimat, British Columbia) is a Canadian television journalist for CBC Newsworld.

== Early life and education ==
Robinson was born in Kitimat (also spelled Kitamaat). She lived briefly on her mother's reserve in Bella Bella, British Columbia, but returned to Kitamaat at age six. She is a member of the Haisla and Heiltsuk First Nations.

Robinson earned an honours degree in mass communications from Carleton University in 1995, and a master's degree in journalism from the University of Western Ontario in 1996.

== Career ==
At age sixteen Robinson began her journalism career by writing articles for The Northern Sentinel Press. She has also written for Aboriginal Voices, The Rez, and Dreamspeaker. She previously reported for BCTV News and hosted the program Pressure Point on Rogers Television in Vancouver.

From August 1998 to March 2013, Robinson anchored evening news broadcasts for CBC. She also hosted a weekly edition of Absolutely Canadian devoted to First Nations news. In 2004 Robinson replaced Knowlton Nash as the host of CBC's educational series News in Review. In 2013, she hosted the biography series "All Our Relations," aired on APTN.

She has worked for the Canadian government (in the Ministry of Indian and Northern Affairs), and has taught students in the Junior Achievement Stay in School program.

She presently holds title of founder and president of Carla Robinson Media Productions.

== Family ==
Robinson has two children: Sam Robinson and Leenah Robinson. Her sister, Eden Robinson, is a noted Canadian writer.
