= Barry Wilson (artist) =

Haisla carver and artist

Barry Wilson (born 1952) is a Haisla artist from British Columbia who specialises in carving and jewellery.

Along with others, Wilson carved the replacement totem pole that was exchanged for the original, stolen from the Haisla community. His work is on display at the Canadian Museum of History.

== Early life and education ==
Wilson was born in May 22, 1952 in Kitimat, British Columbia. His grandfather Gordon Robertson started to teach him carving at the age of five years and his uncle Henry Robertson continued teaching Barry and his brother Derek (1950-2011) in the late 1950's.

Wilson started jewellery making and silkscreening in 1978.

== Career ==
Wilson was awarded First Place for Original Design Jewellery at the Native Arts and Crafts Show in Vancouver in 1988 and in 1989.

In 2006, Wilson and other carvers negotiated the return of the G'psgolox totem pole from Sweden’s Museum of Ethnography to the Haisla community. Wilson worked with his uncle Henry Robertson to create a replica of the pole from 2004 to 2006, in anticipation of a successful negotiated solution. Wilson and others were featured in the National Film Board of Canada documentary Totem: The Return of the G’psgolox Pole.

His 2010 piece Raven Spirit Rattle is exhibited at the Canadian Museum of History.
