= Monkey Beach =

2000 novel by Eden Robinson

- Author: Eden Robinson
- Language: English
- Genre: Supernatural mystery
- Publisher: Vintage Canada, Houghton Mifflin Harcourt (U.S.)
- Publication date: 2000
- Publication place: Canada
- Pages: 377
- Awards: Ethel Wilson Fiction Prize (2001)
- ISBN: 0618219056

Monkey Beach is a supernatural mystery novel written by the Indigenous Canadian author Eden Robinson. It was published by Vintage Canada in 2000, being Eden's first novel. It was the recipient of the 2001 Ethel Wilson Fiction Prize, which is given to work by writers from British Columbia, and was a shortlisted nominee for the Scotiabank Giller Prize and the Governor General's Award for English-language fiction.

== Plot ==
The story of Monkey Beach is relayed through the eyes of Lisamarie Hill, a feisty young woman. Lisamarie's brother, Jimmy, has gone missing at sea under questionable circumstances. Lisamarie reflects on profound events in her life, as she waits on news of her brother. Perhaps in reflecting on these formidable events, a new light will be shed on the ominous circumstances in her life, and within the community of Kitamaat. The introduction of various memorable characters allows the reader to fully grasp the richness of Lisamarie’s tale. Lisamarie possesses the abilities to see and communicate with other worldly beings. These abilities are a source of contention, yet they will eventually satiate the turmoil in her life. The struggle between the physical plane and the supernatural realm also correlates with a greater struggle between cultural identity and mainstream society. In all of this, Lisamarie is led on a journey to understand the disappearance of her brother and come to terms with her identity.

== Symbolism ==
Location and animal symbolism plays a large part in First Nations literature. Animals are used as symbols of the ancestors or as warnings and messengers from the spirit world to those still living. The locations in Monkey Beach play a large part in the emotional progression of the characters. Throughout this, and her following books, Robinson uses all the natural elements to weave the culture of the land into the story.

Symbolism is a very important part of Monkey Beach as well as the Haisla culture. Throughout the story crows are used as a symbol of luck and warning for Robinson’s characters. The first introduction to the importance of crows in this story is Jimmy’s belief that they are a symbol of luck for him. This comes after feeding them before his swim meet leads inevitable win. Following this, it becomes Jimmy’s good luck charm for his following competitions. Luck is not the only symbol that the crow carries. In another section of the novel, Spotty, Jimmy’s favourite raven, alerts Jimmy to the danger his sister is in during the middle of the novel. Lisamarie had several encounters with crows playing a part in her spiritual visions. Coming along with the Red man, who was a sign of death, the crows appearing with Jimmy were a sign of the impending threat to Jimmy’s life; foreshadowing of what was to play out through the rest of the novel. Ravens and crows play a very large part in the mythological histories of many, west coast First Nations communities. They represent both the trickster and the creator of the world. The Raven in Haida mythology is the bringer of light and stars to the world. Also, according to some communities, such as the Haida, the Raven is seen as the creator of man as well, unlocked from the clam shell they were trapped in as expertly depicted by Bill Reid in his sculpture The Raven and the First Men.

== Adaptations ==
Monkey Beach, a film adaptation by Loretta Todd, premiered at the 2020 Vancouver International Film Festival.
