= Johnny Darrell (director) =

Canadian television director and writer

Johnny Darrell is a Canadian television director and writer. He is most notable for his work on the television series Cloudy with a Chance of Meatballs, for which he and Andrew Duncan received a Canadian Screen Award nomination for Best Direction in an Animated Program or Series at the 6th Canadian Screen Awards in 2018, and as a cowriter with Duncan and Loretta Todd of the screenplay for the film Monkey Beach, for which they received a Canadian Screen Award nomination for Best Adapted Screenplay at the 9th Canadian Screen Awards in 2021.

His other credits have included work on the television series Storm Hawks, League of Super Evil, Hot Wheels Battle Force 5, Slugterra and StarBeam.
