= So Long Been Dreaming =

Anthology edited by Nalo Hopkinson

- First edition cover for So Long Been Dreaming: Postcolonial Science Fiction & Fantasy
- Editors: Nalo Hopkinson and Uppinder Mehan
- Original title: So Long Been Dreaming
- Cover artist: Ho Che Anderson
- Language: English
- Genre: Science fiction, horror
- Publisher: Arsenal Pulp Press
- Publication date: 2004
- Publication place: United States
- Media type: Print (paperback)
- Pages: 270
- ISBN: 978-1-55152-158-9
- OCLC: 54373107

So Long Been Dreaming: Postcolonial Science Fiction & Fantasy (2004) is an English language anthology of science fiction and fantasy short stories by African, Asian, South Asian, and Indigenous authors, as well as North American and British writers of colour, edited by the writers Nalo Hopkinson and Uppinder Mehan. Hopkinson provides the introduction, although it is usually misattributed to Samuel R. Delany (whose recommendation of the book is quoted on the book's cover).

== Stories ==
- Nisi Shawl, "Deep End"
- Andrea Hairston, "Griots of the Galaxy"
- Suzette Mayr, "Toot Sweet Matricia"
- Larissa Lai, "Rachel"
- Eden Robinson, "Terminal Avenue"
- Nnedi Okorafor, "When Scarabs Multiply"
- Vandana Singh, "Delhi"
- Tamai Kobayashi, "Panopte’s Eye"
- Sheree Thomas, "The Grassdreaming Tree"
- Wayde Compton, "The Blue Road: A Fairy Tale"
- Karin Lowachee, "The Forgotten Ones"
- Greg van Eekhout, "Native Aliens"
- Celu Amberstone, "Refugees"
- Devorah Major, "Trade Winds"
- Carole McDonnell, "Lingua Franca"
- Ven Begamudré, "Out of Sync"
- Opal Palmer Adisa, "The Living Roots"
- Maya Khankhoje, "Journey Into the Vortex"
- Tobias S. Buckell, "Necahual"
