= Anna Lambe =

Canadian Inuk actress (born 2000)

- Lambe in 2026
- Born: Anna Rynee Bridget Lambe; 25 September 2000 (age 26); Burin, Newfoundland and Labrador, Canada
- Occupation: Actress
- Years active: 2018–present
- Known for: The Grizzlies; Trickster; North of North

Anna Rynee Bridget Lambe (born 25 September 2000) is a Canadian Inuk actress. She is known for her debut role in the 2018 film The Grizzlies, for which she received a nomination for the Canadian Screen Award for Best Supporting Actress at the 7th Canadian Screen Awards.

== Career ==
Lambe made her film debut as Spring in the 2018 film The Grizzlies, which is based on a true story. She was encouraged to audition for the role by her drama teacher. The film was shot in Iqaluit, Lambe's hometown. The film was met with critical acclaim, and Lambe was nominated for Best Supporting Actress at the 7th Canadian Screen Awards for her performance.

In 2020, she had a supporting role as Sarah in the television series Trickster. At the 9th Canadian Screen Awards in 2021, she received a nomination for Best Supporting Actress in a Drama Series.

In September 2022, Lambe was cast in the fourth season of True Detective on HBO.

In 2024, she co-hosted the documentary series Warrior Up! alongside Joel Oulette and Joshua Odjick.

In 2025, Lambe began starring in the CBC/APTN original comedy series North of North. In the same year, she was announced as starring in Nyla Innuksuk's thriller film In the Heart of the South, opposite her North of North co-star Zorga Qaunaq.

== Personal life ==
Lambe was born on 25 September 2000 in Burin, Newfoundland and Labrador. She grew up in Iqaluit, Nunavut, where she attended Inuksuk High School. She won a bronze medal for under-19 girls doubles badminton at the 2017 North American Indigenous Games, and competed in volleyball for Nunavut at the 2018 Arctic Winter Games.

As of April 2022, Lambe was studying International Development and Globalization at the University of Ottawa.

Lambe is bisexual. In 2020, she wrote an open letter calling for the Legislative Assembly of Nunavut to censure MLA Cathy Towtongie, following Towtongie's statement objecting to the use of the word two-spirit in a legislative motion on the grounds that the concept was not a part of Inuit culture. She wrote that "as Inuit, we pride ourselves on being a tolerant, accepting people... Cathy Towtongie does not speak for me as an Inuk in claiming two-spirit lives are not the Inuit way. Sexual fluidity and gender fluidity are parts of Inuit history..."

== Filmography ==
Key
†	Denotes works that have not yet been released

=== Film ===
Year	Title	Role	Notes
2018	The Grizzlies	Spring / Wynter Kuliktana Blais	
2026	Heart of the Beast	Amber	
2026	In the Heart of the South	Yura Ivalu	
2026	The Social Reckoning	Morgan	

=== Television ===
Year	Title	Role	Notes
2020	Trickster	Sarah	Main role
2021–2022	Diggstown	Marea Paul	2 episodes
2022	Three Pines	Blue Two-Rivers	6 episodes
2023	Alaska Daily	Alice Porter	2 episodes
2024	True Detective: Night Country	Kayla Malee	Miniseries
2024	Warrior Up!	Co-host	Documentary series
2025–present	North of North	Siaja	Main role
