= Son of a Trickster =

2017 novel by Eden Robinson

- First edition
- Author: Eden Robinson
- Cover artist: Jennifer Lum (first edition)
- Language: English
- Series: The Trickster trilogy
- Genre: Coming of age; Speculative fiction
- Set in: Kitimat
- Published: February 7, 2017 (Knopf Canada)
- Publication place: Canada
- Pages: 336 (first edition)
- ISBN: 0345810783
- Followed by: Trickster Drift

Son of a Trickster is a 2017 coming of age novel by Indigenous Canadian author Eden Robinson. The first novel in The Trickster trilogy, it follows 16-year-old Jared, who wades through the complications of a broken family, social pressure, drugs, alcohol, and poverty. The novel interweaves the Indigenous myth from Haisla/Heiltsuk oral storytelling, as Jared discovers the Haisla trickster, Wee'jit. The story is set in Kitimat, British Columbia.

It took Robinson eight years to write, and is followed by the 2018 novel, Trickster Drift. The third and final novel, titled Return of the Trickster, was published in 2021.

== Reception and awards ==
The novel was selected for the 2020 edition of Canada Reads, in which it was defended by actress Kaniehtiio Horn.

== Television adaptation ==
Filmmaker Michelle Latimer and Streel Films secured the rights to adapt the book into a TV series. The series premiered on CBC Television as Trickster in 2020.

== Awards and nominations ==
- 2017 Giller Prize shortlist
- 2018 BC Book Prizes - Ethel Wilson Fiction Prize shortlist
- 2018 Ontario Library Association’s Evergreen Award shortlist
- 2018 Sunburst Award shortlist
