= Warrior Up! =

Canadian television documentary series

Warrior Up! is a Canadian documentary television series, which premiered in 2024 on APTN. Hosted by actors Anna Lambe, Joel Oulette and Joshua Odjick, the series profiles Indigenous Canadian youth who are making change in their communities.

The series won the Canada Media Fund Kids Choice Award at the 13th Canadian Screen Awards in 2025.
