= The Average Savage =

Studio album by Snotty Nose Rez Kids
- Released: 2017
- Genre: Hip-hop
- Length: 52:42
- Label: Independent

Snotty Nose Rez Kids chronology
| Snotty Nose Rez Kids (2017) | The Average Savage (2017) | TRAPLINE (2019) |

The Average Savage is the second album from Canadian First Nations hip-hop duo, Snotty Nose Rez Kids. It was released independently in 2017 and served as a follow-up to their self-titled debut. The album was a critical success, propelling the duo into the national spotlight. The album was shortlisted for the 2018 Polaris Music Prize, and nominated for the Juno Award for Indigenous Music Album of the Year at the Juno Awards of 2019. In 2018, the album received a nomination for Best Rap/Hip Hop Album at the Indigenous Music Awards.

== Track listing ==
All tracks are written by Snotty Nose Rez Kids.

| No. | Title | Length |
|---|---|---|
| 1. | "White Lies (Intro)" | 1:36 |
| 2. | "M.I.N.A.Y. (ft. Salia Joseph)" | 3:30 |
| 3. | "Broke Boy Ambitions (ft. Salia Joseph)" | 3:34 |
| 4. | "KKKanada" | 5:11 |
| 5. | "I'm No Racist, But...(Skit)" | 0:52 |
| 6. | "Growing Pains (ft. Hellnback)" | 5:44 |
| 7. | "The Water" | 4:32 |
| 8. | "Barely Even Human (Skit)" | 0:56 |
| 9. | "Savages (ft. Drezus)" | 5:00 |
| 10. | "How Da Red Man Red (Skit)" | 1:33 |
| 11. | "H.O.W. (ft. Salia Joseph)" | 2:59 |
| 12. | "10 Dead Injuns (Skit)" | 1:02 |
| 13. | "Redskin Cowboys (ft. WellSpoke)" | 4:58 |
| 14. | "Northern Lights (ft. Mob Bounce)" | 5:36 |
| 15. | "Forever Sick" | 3:55 |
| 16. | "We Dem Savages (Outro)" | 1:44 |
| Total length: | | 52:42 |
