= Zui-Ki-Tei =

Japanese tea house

Coordinates: 59°19′55″N 18°07′15″E

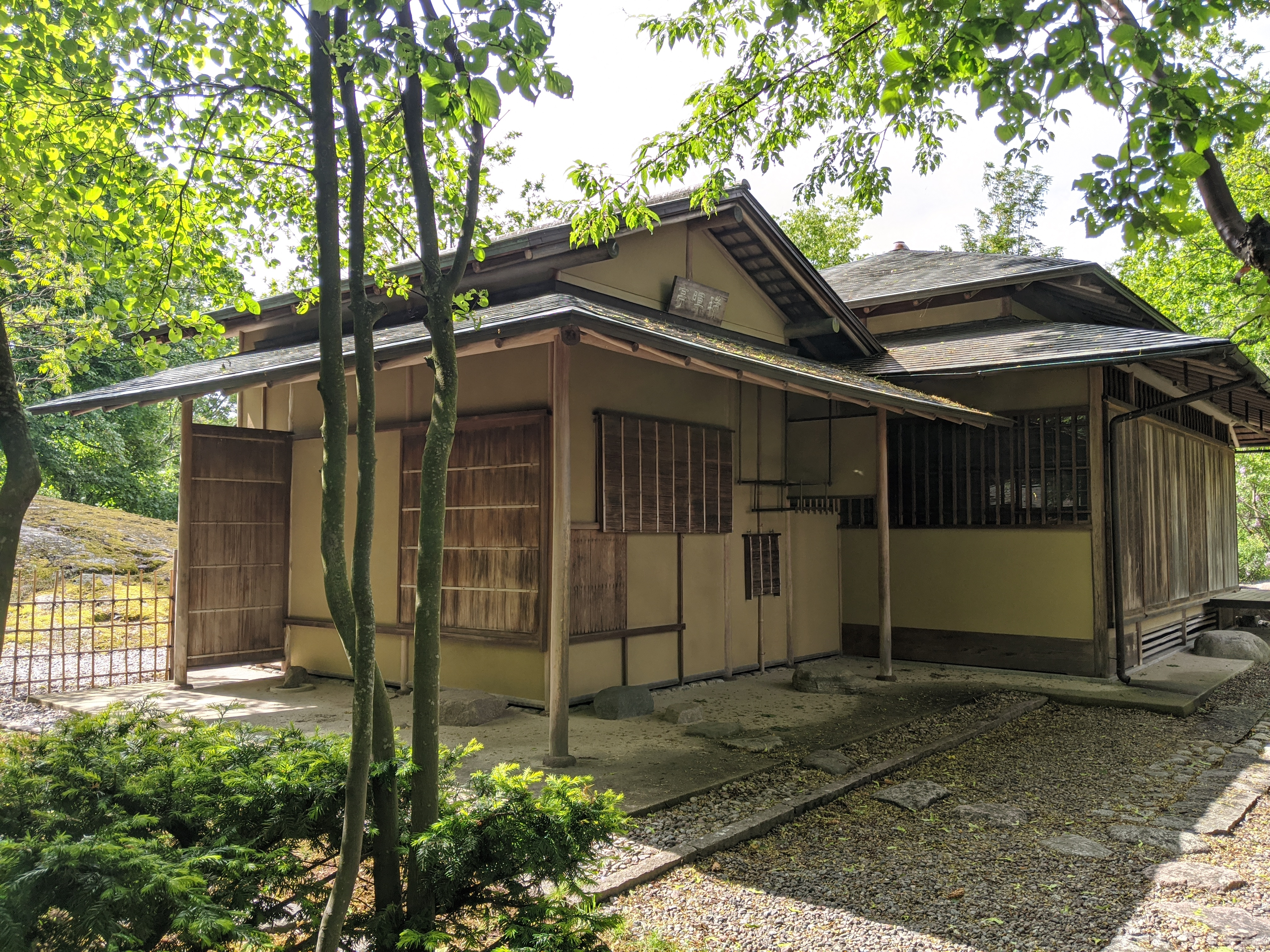
A photo of the Japanese tea ceremony house(chashitsu) Zui-Ki-Tei, Stockholm, Sweden (June, 2019). Its nameplate can be seen above the crawl-through opening (nijiriguchi) to the small tea room (koma). Rain doors (amado) hide the larger tea room (hiroma), barely visible to the right.

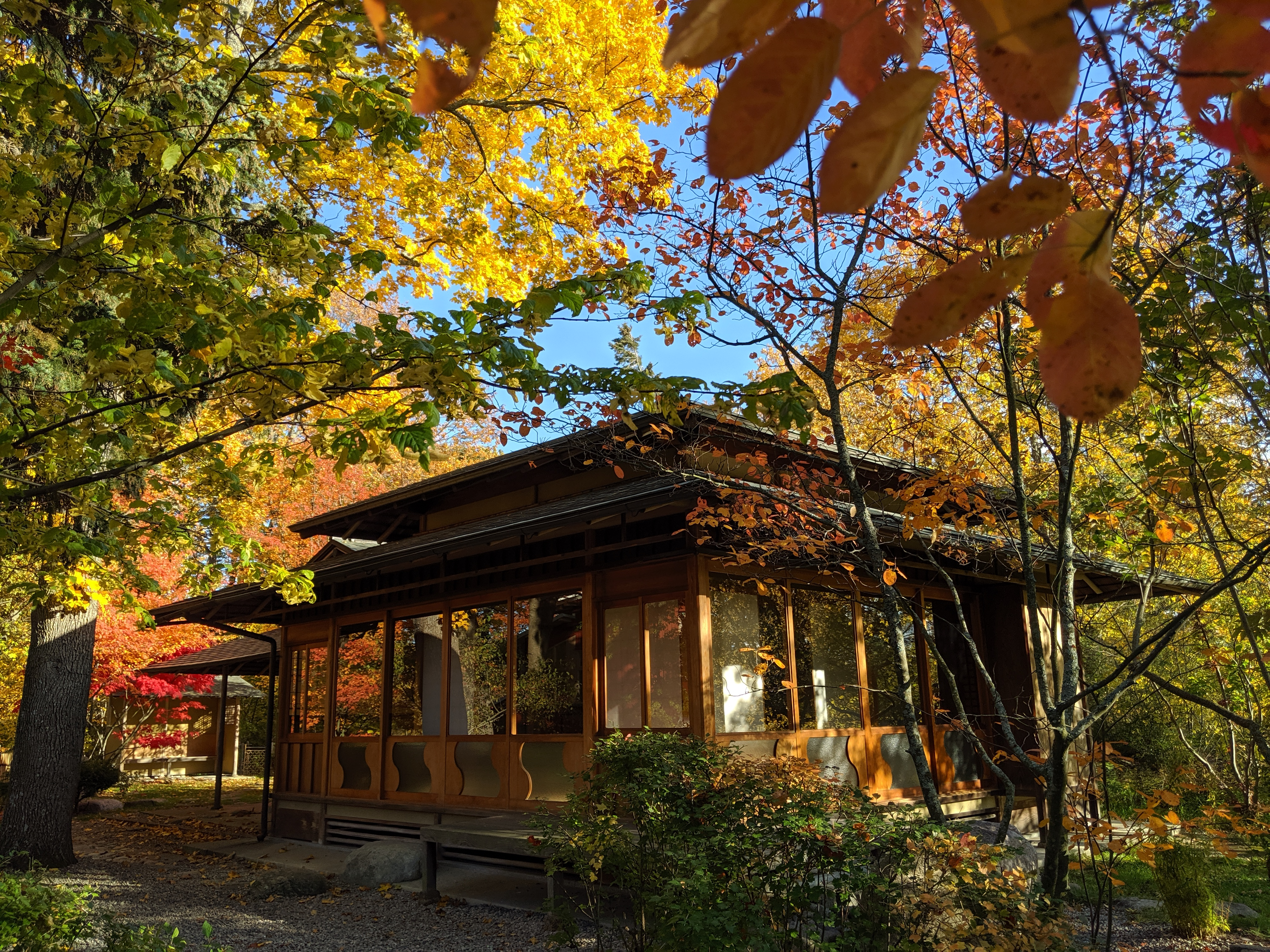
Zui-Ki-Tei, sunset in autumn 2019. View of the hiroma. The amado have been removed and the interior can be viewed by visitors.

Zui-Ki-Tei (瑞暉 亭, "The House of the Promising Light/Home of the Auspicious Light") is a free-standing Japanese tea ceremony house (chashitsu) that can be found in the park outside of the Museum of Ethnography in Stockholm, Sweden. It was built in Japan before being shipped to Sweden and erected in the park in 1990.

It is a public building, officially closed during winter but it is free to visit the park and see the house at any time of the year.

Zui-Ki-Tei is the second chashitsu belonging to the Museum of Ethnography. A previous chashitsu with the same name was erected in the park outside of the museum in 1935, but it burned down in 1969.

== Description ==
Zui-Ki-Tei was designed by architect and professor Masao Nakamura, specifically for the grounds outside the Museum of Ethnography in central Stockholm. The master builder was Hayashi Seibai. When Nakamura designed Zui-Ki-Tei he took into consideration both the location, scenery that would surround the building, the museum's planned activities and the museum's history with a previous chashitsu.

The house includes two tea rooms, a preparation area (mizuya), a host's entrance room (sadōguchi) and a room for storage. The tea rooms are of different sizes. The small one (koma) fits 3 and ¾ tatami mats and the large one (hiroma), fits 6 tatami. The tea rooms are also built in two different architectural styles. The smaller one is built in the sõan-style while the larger one is built in the shoin-style.

Surrounding the chashitsu is a garden(roji) that is split into an inner and outer one. The inner one includes a waiting arbor (koshikake), two stone washbasins (tsukubai), a stone lantern (tōrō), stepping stones (tobi ishi) and more. The two gardens are separated by a bamboo fence and gate.

== History ==
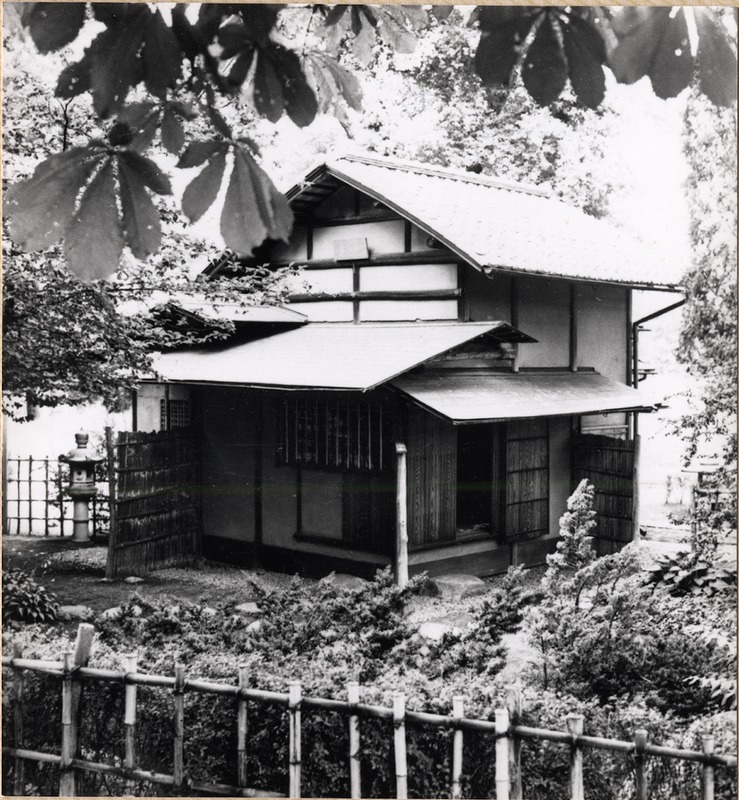
The first Zui-Ki-Tei, 1935–1969.

The idea of establishing a chashitsu in Sweden originally came from Swedish artist Ida Trotzig who brought it to the Museum of Ethnography in the early 1930s. The museum director at the time, Gerhard Lindblom, wrote a letter to the Japanese Committee for Intellectual Cooperation/Japanese League of National Association based in Japan, to inquire on the possibilities of acquiring a traditional chashitsu and how to proceed with the idea. In the beginning, the idea was that the museum, together with the tea import company James Lundgren & Co (for whom Ida Trotzig was working as a lecturer), would acquire a secondhand chashitsu. James Lundgren & Co was to provide the funds for the chashitsu and the museum would provide a place for it but after reaching out to people in Japan they came into contact with the Japanese businessman and politician Ginjirō Fujiwara. Fujiwara had an interest in both chanoyu and Sweden and he became personally invested in the project. It was decided that Ginjirō Fujiwara and James Lundgren & Co would donate the chashitsu together and that the project could now afford a new building, rather than a secondhand one. It was also decided that Ginjirō Fujiwara would be the one responsible for the chashitsu and roji being constructed.

The chashitsu was built in Tokyo, close to the home of its architect, tea master Tsuge Sõkei. It was based on the chashitsu Yūin (又 隠) of the Urasenke school, with the size of the tea room being 4,5 tatami. The chashitsu also included a waiting hall (machiai) and a mizuya.

When finished, one of the brothers to the emperor of Japan at the time, Prince Chichibu, inspected the building during a ceremony in Tokyo on March 20, 1935, together with his wife, and the prince gave it the name Zui-Ki-Tei (瑞暉 亭).

The name has two meanings. “Mr Fujihara explains that in translation it (red. Zui) means ‘bringing promise’ but is also the character for Sweden. Ki means ‘radiant light’, which symbolizes Japan or the ‘Land of the Rising Sun’ and Tei means ‘hut’ or ‘small house’. Thus, poetically, the name can be read as ‘the House of the Promising Light’. Mr. Fujihara explains that it was His Imperial Highness's intention that the name should also lead one's thoughts to the friendship between Japan and Sweden. – Ulla Wagner, former director of The Museum of Ethnography, Stockholm”

After the ceremony in Japan the Zui-Ki-Tei was taken down and shipped to Sweden where the parts were assembled and later inaugurated on October 8th the same year (1935) by Sweden's crown prince at that time, later king Gustav VI Adolf.

On October 1st, 1969, the Zui-Ki-Tei burned down. The cause of the fire was never determined, but it is possible that the destruction of the chashitsu was the work of a serial arsonist. According to the newspapers reporting on the incident, someone had also started fires in several other places in the surrounding area all within a day before the incident. The fire was quickly discovered by one of the museum's employees but it was too late and the building could not be saved, when the fire was extinguished only the outer shell remained. The surviving structure was later demolished. The old koshikake, however, has survived until this day and can be visited in the park behind the museum at any time. The old tsukubai and some tobi ishi remain in the old park while some other items, like the tōrōs, are being kept in the museum storage.

After the fire it was the wish of the museum to erect a new chashitsu, but it would take decades before it would happen. In the 1980s a group consisting of Ida Trotzig's granddaughters Gaby Stenberg-Koch and Ume-Stenberg-Radbruch, representatives of the museum, Bengt Petri, Axel Ivertoth and Taro Gadelius was established, with the goal of bringing a new chashitsu to Sweden. At that time Taro Gadelius was President by seniority of ‘Gadelius KK Japan’, a friend to the people involved in the creation of the old chashitsu and he had also worked with it himself in 1939 as the assistant and translator to Ginjirō Fujiwara during a visit to Sweden, when Fujiwara's goal was to reorganize and complete the roji surrounding first Zui-Ki-Tei. He suggested that the group would inform Oji Paper KK of the project since Ginjirō Fujiwara had served as the president of the former Oji Paper company, and Gadelius took it upon himself to be the group's representative in the matter. In March 1989, Taro Gadelius informed the group and the museum that the companies Oji Paper KK, Jiju, Honshu and Kanzaki had decided to donate a new chashitsu to the museum, and that Gadelius KK Japan together with Gadelius AB would fund the costs of transportation and erection of the building, together with the establishing of the roji. It was also revealed that the architect, Professor Masao Nakamura, had been commissioned to design the chashitsu specifically for the museum grounds.

“The Japanese donors pointed out in their letter that the tea house should be seen as a confirmation of the good relations between Japan and Sweden and also as a tribute to the late Mr. Fujihara.” – Ulla Wagner

Like the previous chashitsu, the new one was built and erected in Japan before being taken down and shipped to Sweden. A ceremony was held on November 4, 1989, in the presence of, among others, prince Hitachi and princess Hitachi as well as princess Chichibu of Japan, before the trip to Sweden where it was inaugurated again on May 28, 1990, this time in the presence of people including princess Christina of Sweden.

== Use ==
The Zui-Ki-Tei can be visited in person all year long but is officially closed during winter. In summertime the museum hosts both private and public tea ceremony demonstrations in the hiroma with the help of the group “Chado Urasenke Tankokai Sweden Association” (Japanska Thesällskapet). At this time of the year they also host guided tours of the chashitsu.

The Zui-Ki-Tei can be explored digitally all year long with the help of Google Arts & Culture.

A special tea ceremony event is held in Zui-Ki-Tei the last Sunday of August each year, in memory of Ida Trotzig, Ginjirō Fujiwara and Taro Gadelius. It is called Gadelius day. The event is usually private.

== Impact ==
Architect and professor Helge Zimdahl wrote a detailed article on Zui-Ki-Tei in Byggmästaren, nr 9 1938, a publication which all architects in Sweden at the time would read.

With the establishment of the new Zui-Ki-Tei in 1990, the non-profit charity organization Chado Urasenke Tankokai Sweden Association was established, with the tea master Eiko Duke Soei. The goal of the organization has been to spread interest of the Japanese tea ceremony to people in Sweden with the help of lectures, courses and tea ceremony demonstrations.

== Gallery ==
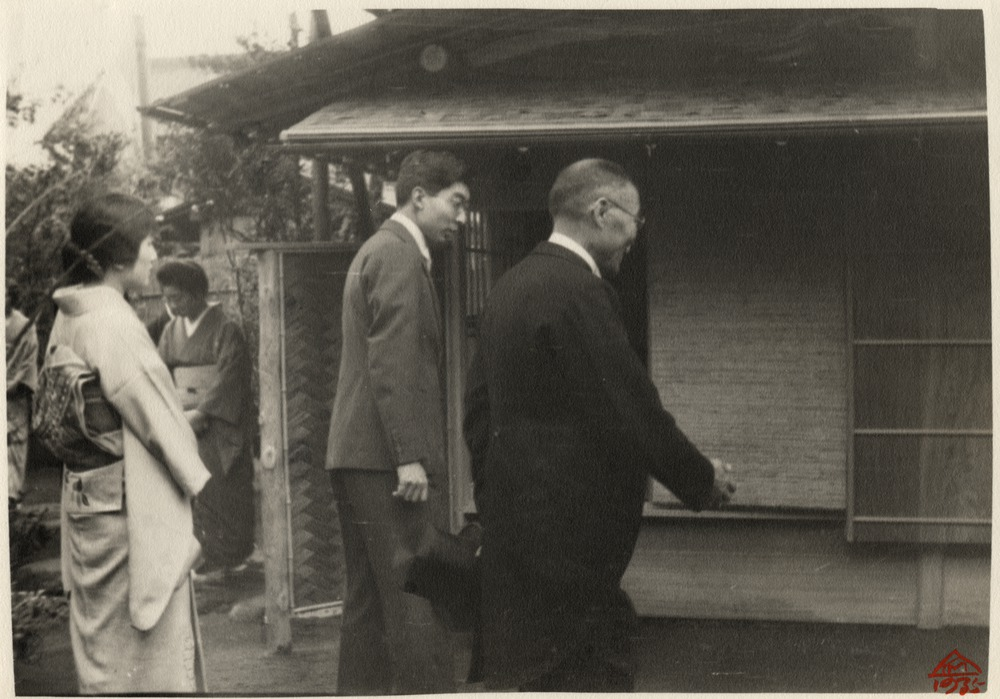
Ginjirō Fujiwara, Prince Chichibu and Princess Chichibu during the inauguration of Zui-Ki-Tei in Tokyo, March 20, 1935.

Inauguration of Zui-Ki-Tei in Sweden, October 8, 1935. From the left: Ida Trotzig, the Japanese minister Shiratori, crown princess and later queen Louise, crown prince and later king Gustav VI Adolf, Douglas Lundgren, consul Lundgren and Mrs Lundgren.

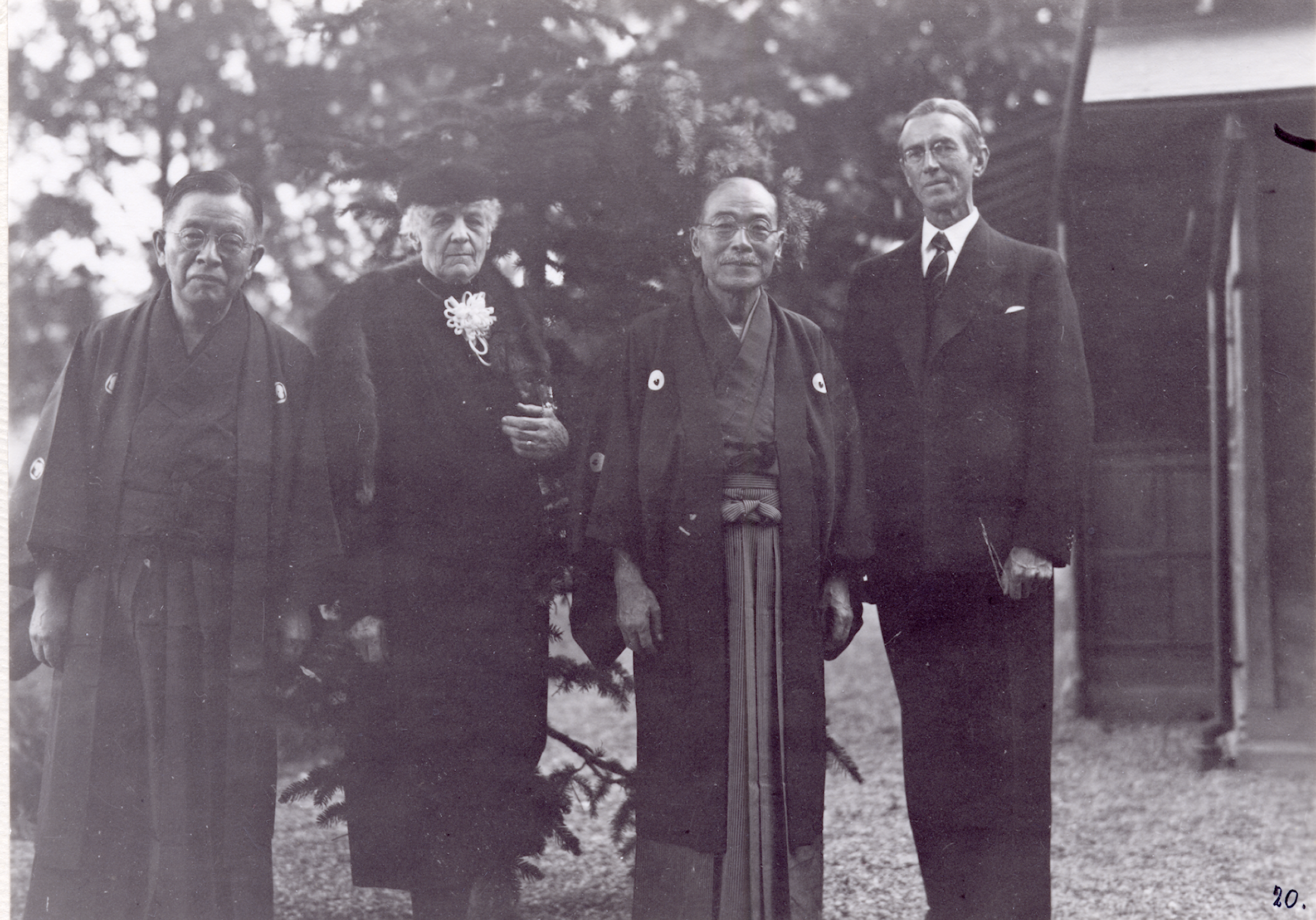
Stockholm 1939. From the left: Fukukita Yasunosuke, Ida Trotzig, Ginjirō Fujiwara and Gerhard Lindblom. Parts of Zui-Ki-Tei can be seen in the background, to the right.

Crown prince of Japan, later Emperor Emeritus Akihito, drinking tea in Zui-Ki-Tei August 18, 1953. The photo was taken in the waiting hall (machiai) of the old Zui-Ki-Tei

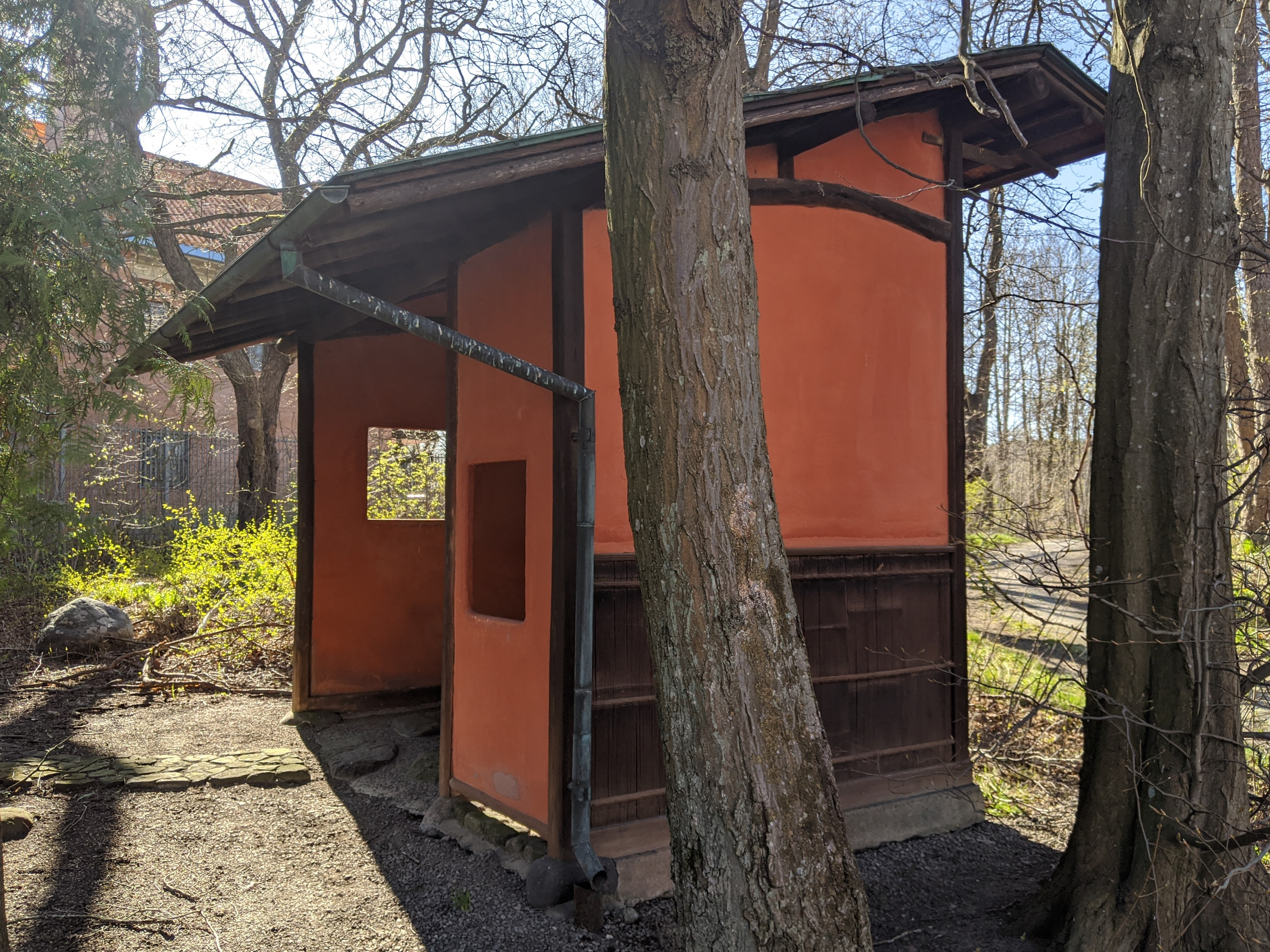
The old waiting arbor (koshikake) from 1935 that survived the fire in 1969. It can still be viewed in the park behind the Museum of Ethnography, Stockholm.

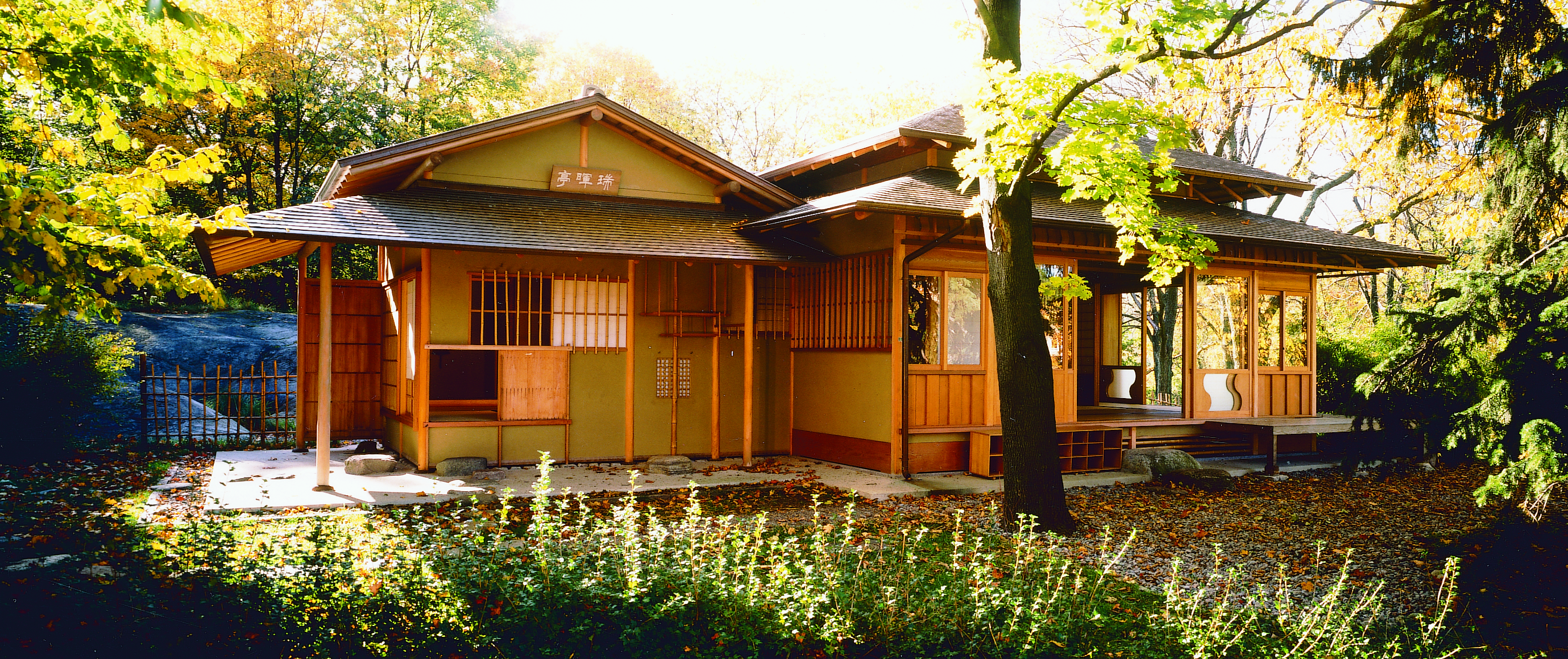
Zui-Ki-Tei, photo probably taken in 1995.

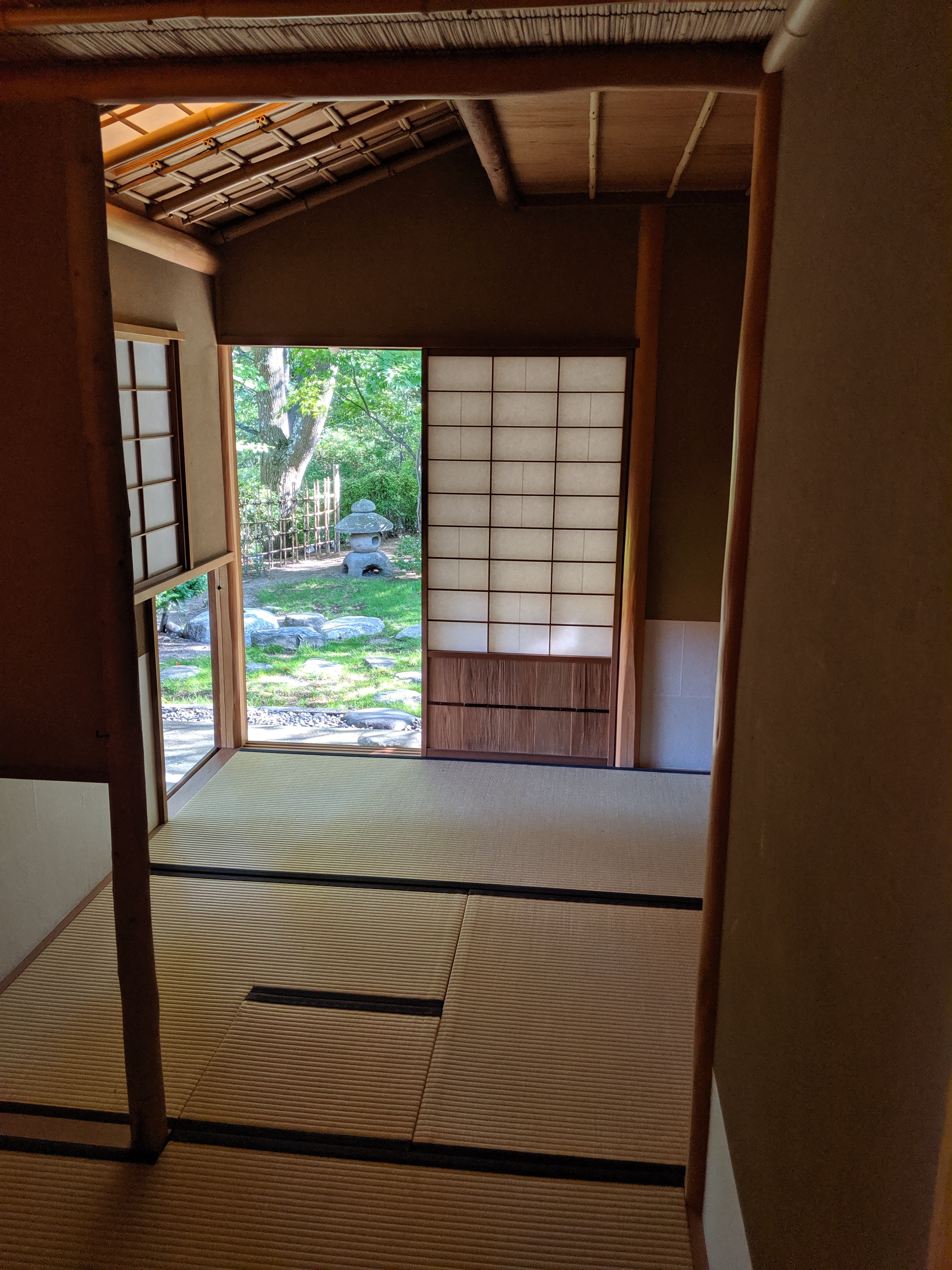
Zui-Ki-Tei 2019. View of the koma. The nijiriguchi and shoji doors are open, showing the roji and tōrō. The tokonoma is not visible.

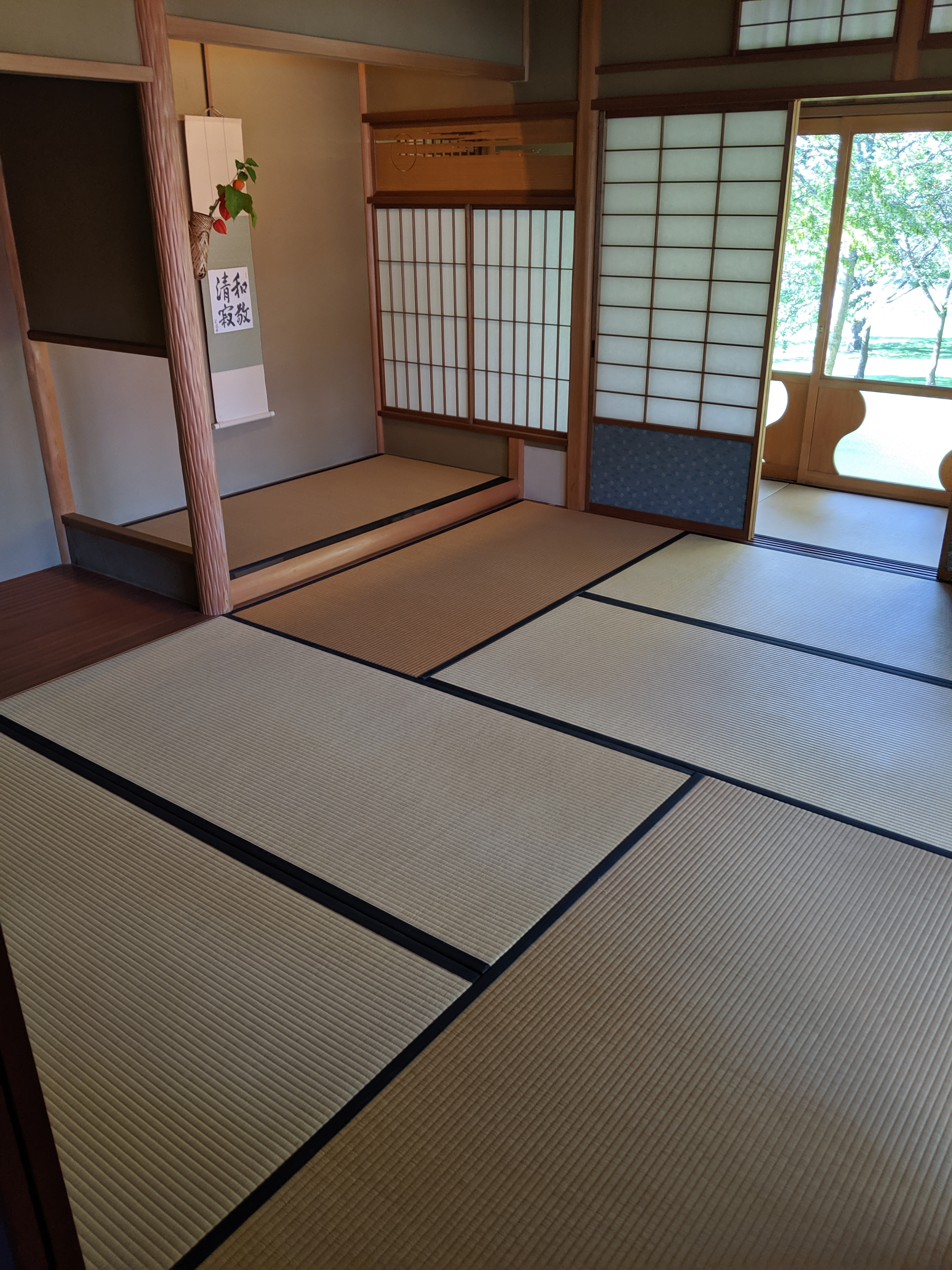
Zui-Ki-Tei 2019 interior. View of the hiroma, tokonoma included. A corridor (engawa) clad in tatami surround the hiroma.
