= Joel Oulette =

Canadian actor

- Oulette in 2024
- Born: December 7, 2001 (age 24); Medicine Hat, Alberta, Canada
- Occupation: Actor
- Years active: 2007–present
- Known for: Trickster

Joel Oulette (born 2001) is a Canadian actor, most noted for his lead role as Jared in the television drama series Trickster. He was cast in the series as his first starring role after supporting performances in the television series Tribal and the films Parallel Minds and Monkey Beach.

== Early life ==
Oulette was born in Medicine Hat, Alberta, and has ties to the Red River Métis Nation and Cumberland House Cree Nation. He began acting at the age of five, encouraged by his mother, who was an actress herself. He attended Strathmore High School. He also played for his school's Spartan's Football team.

Oulette and his sister, Shayla Stonechild, competed as a team in the ninth season of The Amazing Race Canada in 2023.

== Career ==
Oulette was cast as an extra on HBO's 2007 Western historical drama television film, Bury My Heart at Wounded Knee. In 2018, he played a small role on the prehistorical adventure film, Alpha. He later earned a larger role on the drama film, Monkey Beach, released in 2020. He was also on the television crime drama series, Tribal. He starred as Runaway on the 2020 film, Parallel Minds. In September 2019, he was cast as the starring role of Jared, on the supernatural thriller drama television series, Trickster. The show premiered in October 2020. Oulette made an appearance during a commercial break on Hockey Night in Canada in promotion of the show.

In February 2021, he starred in season two, episode ten of the Netflix Series Two Sentence Horror Stories as an Indigenous man who faces a dark history when he and his girlfriend visit an old west reenactment for their podcast. He starred in Daniel Foreman's thriller film Abducted as Derrick Desjardins, which was released in 2021. Oulette also played the main character Ben Taggart in the first season of the BYUtv and Family Channel series Ruby and the Well.

At the 9th Canadian Screen Awards in 2021, he received a nomination for Best Actor in a Drama Series for Trickster. In 2022, Oulette was cast as Hahn in the live-action Avatar: The Last Airbender. In 2023, Oulette competed on the ninth season of The Amazing Race Canada with his sister Shayla.

In 2024, he co-hosted the documentary series Warrior Up! with Anna Lambe and Joshua Odjick.

In 2026, Oulette portrayed Tommy Ross in Carrie, an eight-episode horror miniseries developed by Mike Flanagan for Amazon Prime Video and based on Stephen King’s 1974 novel of the same name. His character is the boyfriend of Sue Snell, portrayed by Siena Agudong, and develops a friendship with Carrie White, played by Summer H. Howell.

== Filmography ==
=== Film ===
Year	Title	Role	Notes	Ref.
2018	Alpha	Youth Hunter		
2020	Parallel Minds	Runaway		
2020	Monkey Beach	Jimmy		
2021	Abducted	Derrick Desjardins		
2023	Cascade	Jesse		
2024	Can I Get a Witness?	Daniel		
2024	Julian and the Wind	Julian	Short film	
2024	Here	Indigenous Man		
2026	Descendants: Wicked Wonderland	Robbie Hood		
2026	Seventeen	Phoenix		

=== Television ===
Year	Title	Role	Notes	Ref.
2007	Bury My Heart at Wounded Knee	Indigenous Boy	Television film	
2020	Tribal	Jordan	Episode: "The Road to Hell is Paved"	
2020	Trickster	Jared	Lead role	
2021	Two Sentence Horror Stories	Jeremy	Episode: "Manifest Destiny"	
2021	Ruby and the Well	Ben Taggart	6 episodes	
2022	Notes on Being Un-Popular	Joshua Bird	Unaired TV Pilot	
2023	The Amazing Race Canada	Himself	Contestant, season 9	
2023	Nancy Drew	Nashua Kipp	2 episodes	
2023-present	My Life with the Walter Boys	Jay Abrahams	Recurring role	
2024	Avatar: The Last Airbender	Hahn	2 episodes	
2024	Don't Even	Wesley	TV series	
2024	Warrior Up!	Himself	Host; documentary series	
2025	Sullivan's Crossing	Jacob Cranebear	TV Series	
2025–present	Splinter Cell: Deathwatch	Thunder	Voice	
2026	Carrie	Tommy Ross		

== Awards and nominations ==
Year	Award	Category	Work	Result	Refs
2021	Canadian Screen Awards	Best Actor in a Drama Series	Trickster	Nominated	
