= Trickster (Canadian TV series) =

Canadian TV series

- Genre: Supernatural thriller; Drama; Coming-of-age; Haisla mythology
- Created by: Michelle Latimer; Tony Elliott
- Based on: Son of a Trickster by Eden Robinson
- Directed by: Michelle Latimer
- Starring: Joel Oulette; Crystle Lightning; Craig Lauzon; Anna Lambe
- Country of origin: Canada
- Original language: English
- No. of seasons: 1
- No. of episodes: 6

Production
- Executive producers: Michelle Latimer; Tony Elliott; Jennifer Kawaja; Julia Sereny; Penny Gummerson
- Production companies: Streel Films; Sienna Films

Original release
- Network: CBC
- Release: October 7 – November 11, 2020

Trickster is a Canadian coming-of-age supernatural thriller drama television series, which premiered on CBC Television on October 7, 2020. The series was created by Tony Elliott and Michelle Latimer with Latimer also directing, and was adapted from Eden Robinson's 2017 novel Son of a Trickster.

The series was renewed for a second season prior to the first season's premiere; however, these plans were eventually cancelled on January 29, 2021, due to controversy around Michelle Latimer's Indigenous heritage.

== Premise ==
The series centres on Jared, an Indigenous Haisla teenager and small-time drug dealer in Kitimat, British Columbia, who becomes increasingly aware of the magical events that seem to follow him.

== Cast ==
=== Main ===
- Joel Oulette as Jared
- Crystle Lightning as Maggie, Jared's mother
- Kalani Queypo as Wade
- Nathan Alexis as Crashpad, Jared's best friend
- Anna Lambe as Sarah
- Georgina Lightning as Sophia, Jared's grandmother

=== Supporting ===
- Craig Lauzon as Phil Nelson, Jared's father
- Joel Thomas Hynes as Richie, Maggie's dealer
- Mark Camacho as Tony
- Gail Maurice as Georgina
- Jamie Spilchuk as Mr. Good, a school guidance counselor
- William C. Cole as Mr. Jacks

== Episodes ==
No.	Title	Directed by	Written by	Original release date	Canada viewers (millions)
1	"Episode 1"	Michelle Latimer	Tony Elliott & Michelle Latimer	October 7, 2020	N/A
Underachieving high school student Jared sells the drug "ecstasy" from the Tasty Bucket restaurant drive-thru to pay the bills for his parents, who separated a year ago. Both are jobless, and Maggie owes money to drug dealer Richie while Phil's girlfriend Destiny is pregnant. Jared begins cooking more drugs to sell at a party but he is attacked by a look-alike and robbed. Maggie attacks newly-arrived Wade at the Tasty Bucket, costing Jared his job. Jared sees his double again at the party and becomes sick, and later a crow talks to him. His friend Crashpad sells a gaming account to pay Richie, but they find Richie's trailer burned down – Maggie did it in an insurance fraud scam, and has invited violent Richie to live with them as her boyfriend.
2	"Episode 2"	Michelle Latimer	Tony Elliott & Michelle Latimer	October 14, 2020	N/A
Richie bullies Jared as man of the house but reconsiders after experiencing Maggie's volatility. Wade claims to be Jared's father though Maggie denies this. In a flashback, Wade helps birth Jared in the back of Maggie's truck, then takes him to a mamathlteeasa, but Maggie screams, injuring Wade, and she leaves him for dead. Wade takes Jared to the mamathlteesa. Maggie threatens Wade, and later casts a spell which has a tree fall in front of his motorcycle. Also, Georgina and Edna confront Wade over unstated obligations, Jared grows closer to Sarah, and Phil gives Jared a mobility scooter for a food-delivery job.
3	"Episode 3"	Michelle Latimer	Penny E. Gummerson	October 21, 2020	N/A
Maggie locates Wade's motorcycle but finds he has escaped death a second time. She goes to Sophia for help, explaining that voices have been telling her that Wade must die. They identify Wade as a trickster. Richie kicks Jared out of Maggie's house and threatens to burn his stuff, so Jared has Richie arrested for arson. Jared's visions worsen. He sees Georgina's skin crawl, making her realize that he is Wade's son. Georgina follows Jared to school – which has been emptied for Sarah's die-in protest of pipeline construction – and Georgina is fought by Wade who initially appears in the form of a crow. Jared flees to his cookhouse where Wade tells him that he is a trickster and Maggie is a witch.
4	"Episode 4"	Michelle Latimer	Zoe Leigh Hopkins	October 28, 2020	N/A
In a flashback, Georgina demands Wade "open the north door" to let them go home, but he is enjoying a lifestyle of trading furs for whiskey. Wade urges Jared to lie low then accompany him to Vancouver. Jared meets Sarah while getting supplies; they do ecstasy and spend the night together. Georgina makes Wade hear the land screaming in pain, which incapacitates him. She abducts him and plans to force Wade and Jared together. Maggie and Sophia use a calling spell, and the hunters follow Wade to Sophia's cabin, where Jared is also called. A struggle breaks out and Maggie shoots each of the hunters, but Jared grows feathers and the hunters flee – as does Crashpad. Wade says that Jared must one day kill him to maintain balance. A flashback shows a trickster willingly drowned by teenaged Wade, while on the shore a skinless figure appears and witches sew it into a skin as Georgina, who guides Wade into his trickster powers.
5	"Episode 5"	Michelle Latimer	Story: Tony Elliott, Penny E. Gummerson & Michelle Latimer; Teleplay: Penny E. Gummerson	November 4, 2020	N/A
Maggie traps Wade but he escapes. She finds the hunters, whose torn skins have been mended by Sophia, and learns that Wade may sacrifice Jared in his place. Jared spends the day with Sarah; although she likes Kitimat, she agrees to go to Vancouver with him. At the ferry, Jared tries to explain his nature but Sarah feels rejected. Jared is guided by Wade to the ceremony; flashbacks show an earlier ceremony in which Wade killed another son. Maggie interrupts and shoots each of them with a crossbow. Wade transforms and flies away as a crow. Jared has a vision of a burning world littered with bones, until brought he is back to the living by Maggie and Phil.
6	"Episode 6"	Michelle Latimer	Tony Elliott	November 11, 2020	N/A
Wade follows Maggie and Jared as they flee; he is ambushed by Sophia and the hunters, but escapes. The hunters want to restrain Wade so Jared can kill him, but Maggie believes it's too dangerous and that Jared isn't ready. Wade captures Maggie, drawing Sophia, Georgina and Edna away from Jared. Wade then appears in the form of Sarah and lures Jared away from Crashpad's house. As they confront each other and advantage shifts, Jared pleads for another way out and Wade pleads to stay alive to preserve their traditions from cultural genocide. Maggie arrives and burns Wade alive, collecting his ashes in a mason jar which she gives to Jared – as only a trickster can kill a trickster. Feeling betrayed, the hunters pledge to make sure Jared kills Wade next time, and to protect their world by ending the trickster line. Maggie and Jared attempt sobriety, while Sophia leaves with the hunters. Sarah is taken away by Indian agents, and Jared takes a bus out of town.

== Production ==
Despite being set in British Columbia, the majority of the show was filmed in and around North Bay, Ontario, although some outdoor establishing shots were filmed in Kitimat. The production was supported by Ontario Creates and regional film organizations in Northern Ontario, which promoted the series as part of growing film production activity in the region. Officials in North Bay stated that the production generated temporary employment opportunities for local crew members and contributed to local businesses through hotel stays, catering, and location rentals during filming. Local media coverage also noted that Trickster was among several productions that increased North Bay’s visibility as a filming destination outside of major production hubs such as Toronto and Vancouver. The costume designer for the series was Adriana Fulop.

In advance of the television premiere, two episodes of the series were screened in the Primetime program at the 2020 Toronto International Film Festival, and at the 2020 Cinéfest Sudbury International Film Festival in Sudbury.

The first season was directed and co-written by Michelle Latimer. Following the emergence of questions about the legitimacy of her indigenous status, producers Tony Elliott and Danis Goulet resigned in protest on December 18, 2020, and Latimer resigned from the series three days later. The network did not immediately announce any decision on whether to replace her or simply cancel production of the followup seasons; the show's cancellation was announced in January 2021.

Writer Drew Hayden Taylor criticized the network's decision to cancel the series, writing that "if the chief executive officer of a company does something questionable, you fire the CEO, you don’t dissolve the company." He pointed out that a significant number of indigenous filmmakers are working in the contemporary Canadian film industry, who could easily have been hired to continue the show under new leadership: "The Indigenous film community is thriving, eager and capable of maintaining, maybe even improving, the framework that is already there and continue it forward. Just get a new showrunner. Showrunners come and go all the time in the television industry. I know three that are baristas."

== International broadcast ==
In Australia, SBSOnDemand acquired the broadcast rights for the series, where it premiered on October 27, 2020.

In the UK, Syfy acquired the broadcast rights for the series, where it premiered on November 23, 2020.

In the US, The CW acquired the broadcast rights for the series, where it premiered on January 12, 2021.

In Brazil, Globoplay acquired the broadcast rights for the series, where it premiered on March 5, 2021.

== Response ==
In its December 2020 year in review, the Canadian film and television industry magazine Playback named Trickster the Scripted Series of the Year.

Writing for The Globe and Mail, Drew Hayden Taylor positioned the series as a leading voice in the contemporary emergence of indigenous speculative fiction, alongside authors such as Cherie Dimaline, Waubgeshig Rice, and Yvette Nolan. He linked the genre to indigenous storytelling traditions, which are often based on stories of the fantastical and mystical, and concluded that "Earlier, I mentioned that it was a genre we were interested in exploring. I may have been wrong. I think it’s a genre our Elders were familiar with. We’re just rediscovering it and putting new moccasins on it."

=== Awards ===
Award	Date of ceremony	Category	Nominees	Result	Reference
Canadian Screen Awards	May 20, 2021	Best Actor in a Drama Series	Joel Oulette	Nominated	
Canadian Screen Awards	May 20, 2021	Best Actress in a Drama Series	Crystle Lightning	Won	
Canadian Screen Awards	May 20, 2021	Best Supporting Actor in a Drama Series	Joel Thomas Hynes	Nominated	
Canadian Screen Awards	May 20, 2021	Best Supporting Actor in a Drama Series	Kalani Queypo	Nominated	
Canadian Screen Awards	May 20, 2021	Best Supporting Actress in a Drama Series	Anna Lambe	Nominated	
Canadian Screen Awards	May 20, 2021	Best Supporting Actress in a Drama Series	Georgina Lightning	Nominated	
Canadian Screen Awards	May 20, 2021	Best Supporting Actress in a Drama Series	Gail Maurice	Nominated	
Canadian Screen Awards	May 20, 2021	Best Makeup (Television)	Steve Newburn, Emily O’Quinn Code, Kayla Dobilas, Trina Brink — "Episode 104"	Won	
Canadian Screen Awards	May 20, 2021	Best Hair (Television)	Ashley Nay, Dann Campbell — "Episode 103"	Nominated	
Canadian Screen Awards	May 20, 2021	Best Editing in a Dramatic Program or Series	Katie Chipperfield — "Episode 102"	Nominated	
Canadian Screen Awards	May 20, 2021	Best Editing in a Dramatic Program or Series	D. Gillian Truster — "Episode 104"	Nominated	
Canadian Screen Awards	May 20, 2021	Production Design/Art Direction in a Fiction Program or Series	John Dondertman — "Episode 105"	Won	
Canadian Screen Awards	May 20, 2021	Best Visual Effects (Television)	Tom Plaskett, Tracy Grant, Dayna Pearce, Matt Philip, Mercedes Delgado, Janis Cudars, Chris Doe, Adam Smith, Sawyer Tomkinson-Hunnef, Jay Stanners — "Episode 104"	Nominated	
Canadian Screen Awards	May 20, 2021	Best Writing in a Drama Series	Penny E. Gummerson — "Episode 105"	Nominated	
Canadian Screen Awards	May 20, 2021	Best Stunt Coordination	Randy Butcher	Nominated	
