= Terminal Avenue =

Short story by Eden Robinson

- Short story by Eden Robinson
- Country: Canada
- Language: English
- Genre(s): Science fiction

Publication
- Published in: So Long Been Dreaming
- Publication type: Anthology
- Publisher: Arsenal Pulp Press
- Publication date: 2004

"Terminal Avenue" is a short story by Canadian author Eden Robinson. It was originally intended to be included in her 1995 short story collection Traplines but was omitted because, in Robinson's words, "back in the mid-90s, bondage porn didn't belong in a serious fiction collection." It was later included in So Long Been Dreaming, an anthology of postcolonial science fiction and fantasy edited by Nalo Hopkinson and Uppinder Mehan. It was also included in Walking the Clouds, an anthology of Indigenous science fiction edited by Gracle L. Dillon.

== Background ==
Eden Robinson wrote "Terminal Avenue" "in Vancouver, Canada on the number 9 Broadway bus between Commercial and the University of British Columbia" on the third anniversary of the Oka Uprising. The uprising, also known as the Oka Crisis, was a 1990 confrontation between a group of Mohawk people (along with allied Native activists) and Quebec's provincial police force over the proposed construction of a golf course on territory that, according to local Mohawk people, had been sold illegally. The conflict escalated to the point of gun battles between activists and provincial forces, resulting in one fatality (a QP corporal). According to Robinson, "It was my spec fic, bondage, aboriginal response to Oka and the Fraser River salmon wars."

== Plot ==
Set in what appears to be a somewhat futuristic Vancouver, the story is narrated by a Native Canadian man named Wilson Wilson (Wil). In this Canada, Indigenous people have been removed from their lands and ghettoized in urban reservations. There, they face continual brutalization by armored security officers. The armored officers are described as sexless and invulnerable, their voices mechanically distorted to conceal their identities.

The story shifts quickly between multiple timeframes. In one, the reader learns that in Wil's professional life, he is a professional submissive at an exclusive BDSM club. There, his lover (unnamed but marked as white), together with others dressed in security officer uniforms, performs sadomasochistic acts on him for an audience. In private, their roles are reversed, with Wil assuming the dominant role, but his lover maintaining the security officer's uniform.

In a past timeframe, the reader is told about Wil's father holding an illegal potlatch before being removed from the Douglas Channel area to the urban reservation. For this act, his father is later stopped along the road and beaten nearly to death by security officers. He never recovers psychologically, and commits suicide soon after. Subsequently, Wil's brother, Kevin (the only other named character in the story), participates in the Oka Uprising. After the uprising's failure, he becomes a security officer, and is disowned by his family.

The "present" timeframe is extremely condensed. A group of security officers is approaching Wil, preparing to beat him (at the story's close, presumably to his death). Wil wonders whether perhaps his brother is one of the officers assaulting him.
