= Celu Amberstone =

Canadian writer

Celu Amberstone (born 1947), sometimes seen as Celu Amberston, is a Canadian writer of fantasy and science fiction.

== Early life and education ==
Celu Amberstone is of Cherokee and Scots-Irish ancestry. She is blind, from prenatal exposure to rubella. She holds a bachelor's degree in cultural anthropology and a master's degree in health education.

== Career ==
Books by Amberstone include Blessings of the Blood: A Book of Menstrual Lore and Rituals for Women (1991), Deepening the Power: Community Ritual and Sacred Theatre (Beach Holme Publishing 1995), and The Dreamer's Legacy (Kegedonce Press 2012). Her short story "Refugees" appears in So Long Been Dreaming: Postcolonial Science Fiction and Fantasy (2004), edited by Nalo Hopkinson and Uppinder Mehan. "Refugees" was also excerpted in Walking the Clouds: An Anthology of Indigenous Science Fiction (2012), edited by Grace L. Dillon. The story has been the subject of several scholarly articles, as an example of Indigenous Futurism, including the lecture "Early America through the Lens of Science Fiction" by Laura M. Stevens of the University of Tulsa at her lecture in Obama Institute for Transnational American Studies, Johannes Gutenberg University Mainz, Germany.

== Personal life ==
Amberstone lives in Victoria, British Columbia.
