= Eden Robinson =

Indigenous Canadian author

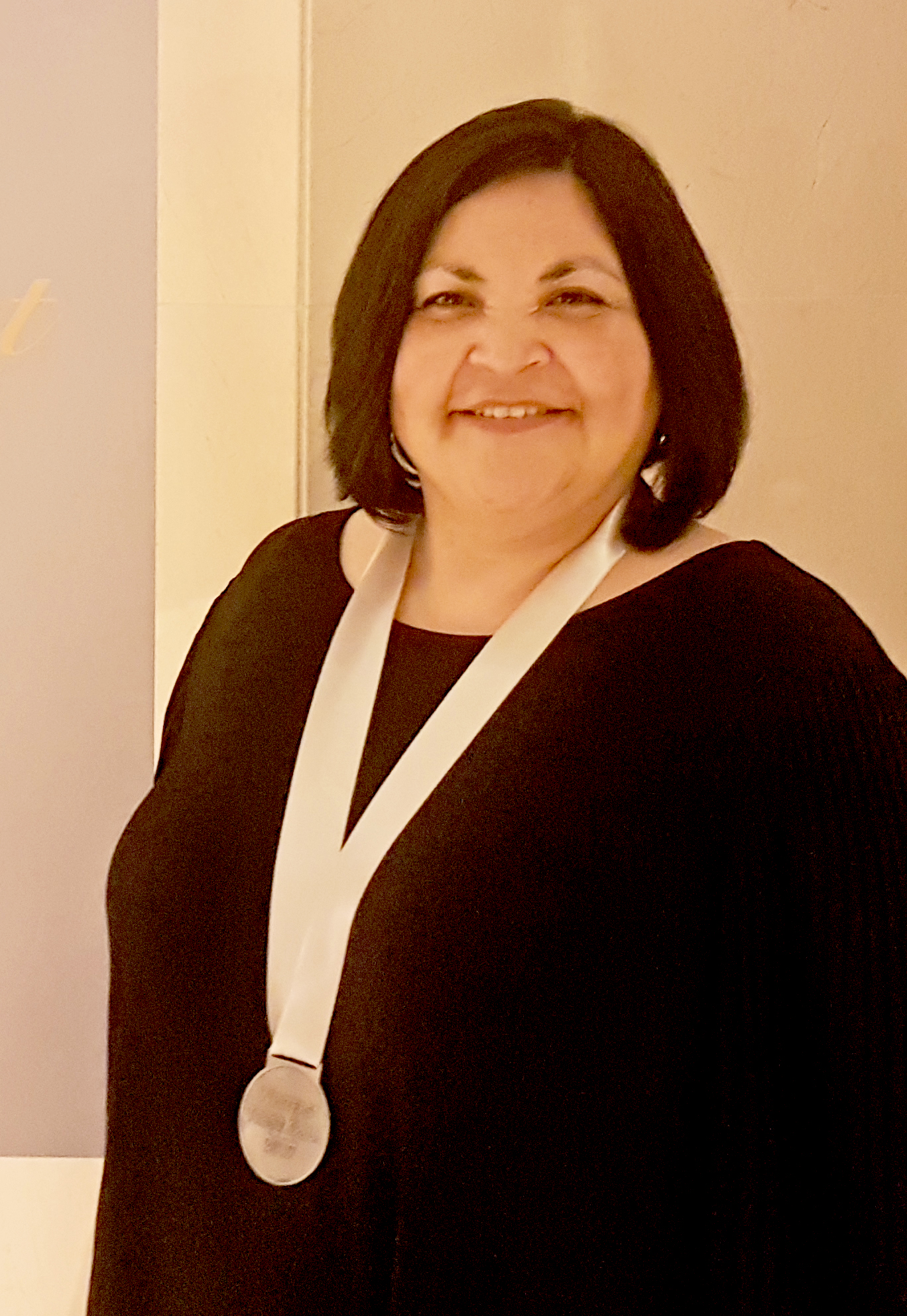
- Robinson in November 2017
- Born: Eden Robinson; January 19, 1968 (age 58); Kitimat, British Columbia, Canada
- Occupation: Author
- Writing career
- Genres: Speculative fiction; gothic fiction
- Notable works: Monkey Beach; Traplines; Blood Sports
- Notable awards: Ethel Wilson Fiction Prize; 2001; Writers' Trust Engel/Findley Award; 2016

Eden Victoria Lena Robinson (born 19 January 1968) is an Indigenous Canadian author. She is a member of the Haisla and Heiltsuk First Nations in British Columbia, Canada.

== Personal life ==
Robinson was born in Kitamaat Village, British Columbia, and is a member of the Haisla and Heiltsuk First Nations. Robinson earned a Bachelor of Arts from the University of Victoria, followed by a Master of Fine Arts from the University of British Columbia.

In 2003, Robinson returned to Kitamaat Village to provide care for her father, who had been battling Parkinson's disease since 1998. In 2019, she was diagnosed with polymyalgia rheumatica.

Her sister, Carla Robinson, is a television journalist for CBC Newsworld.

== Works ==
Robinson's first book, Traplines (1995), is a collection of four short stories. The narrators recount tales of their relationships with sociopaths and psychopaths. The collection won the Winifred Holtby Memorial Prize for the best regional work by a Commonwealth writer. One of the stories, "Queen of the North", was also published in The Penguin Anthology of Stories by Canadian Women. Another of her short stories, "Terminal Avenue", (which was not included in Traplines) was published in the anthology of postcolonial science fiction and fantasy So Long Been Dreaming.

Her second book, Monkey Beach (2000), is a novel. It is set in Kitamaat territory and follows a teenage girl's search for answers about her younger brother's disappearance at sea, as well as telling a story about growing up on a Haisla reserve. The book is both a mystery and a spiritual journey, combining contemporary realism with Haisla mysticism. Monkey Beach was shortlisted for the Scotiabank Giller Prize and the Governor General's Award for English-language fiction, and received the Ethel Wilson Fiction Prize.

In her third book, Blood Sports (2006), also a novel, Robinson returns to the characters and urban terrain of her novella "Contact Sports" from Traplines.

Her novel Son of a Trickster (2017) is a humorous coming-of-age novel and the first of a trilogy. It took Robinson eight years to write, and was originally conceived as a short story. The second book in the trilogy is Trickster Drift (2018), which follows the main character from Kitamaat to Vancouver. The third book in the trilogy, titled The Return of the Trickster, was published March 2, 2021.

Son of a Trickster was optioned for a television series, which premiered as Trickster on CBC Television in 2020.

Her epic fantasy, The Sorceress of Sky Serpents (2026), was released in September 2026. The story follows Yuala, the daughter of the Guardian of the Eagle Clan, as she navigates life on a dangerous, post-apocalyptic planet where monsters hunt the survivors of the sorcerer's war. It was a Canadian fiction bestseller.

== Awards and honours ==
Robinson was awarded the Ethel Wilson Fiction Prize in 2001 for Monkey Beach, and the Writers' Trust Engel/Findley Award in 2016 for her body of work. In 2017, she was named a recipient of the $50,000 Writers' Trust Fellowship.

Son of a Trickster was nominated for the 2017 Scotiabank Giller Prize. Trickster Drift won the Ethel Wilson Fiction Prize on May 11, 2019.

Son of a Trickster was selected for the 2020 edition of Canada Reads, in which it was defended by actor Kaniehtiio Horn.

She won the Indspire Award for Arts in 2024.

== Books ==
- Traplines (1996), ISBN 0-8050-4446-9
- Monkey Beach (2000), ISBN 0-618-07327-2
- Blood Sports (2006), ISBN 0-7710-7604-5
- Sasquatch at Home: Traditional Protocols & Modern Storytelling (2011), ISBN 0-8886-4559-7
- Son of a Trickster (2017), ISBN 978-0345810786
- Trickster Drift (2018), ISBN 073527343X
- Return of the Trickster (2021), ISBN 9780735273467
- The Sorceress of Sky Serpents (2026), ISBN 9781039011656
