= Haisla Nation =

- Band No. 676
- People: Haisla people
- Headquarters: Kitamaat Village
- Province: British Columbia

Land
- Main reserve: Kitamaat Village
- Land area: 7.3 km^{2} (2.8 sq mi)

Population (2024)
- On reserve: 635
- On other land: 52
- Off reserve: 1429
- Total population: 2116

Government
- Chief: Maureen Nyce

Website
- haisla.ca

The Haisla Nation is the Indian Act-mandated band government which represents the Haisla people in the North Coast region of the Canadian province of British Columbia, centred on the reserve community of Kitamaat Village. The traditional territory of the Haisla people is situated along the Douglas Channel Region of Kitimat on British Columbia's north coast, and includes the Kitlope Valley which is rich in natural resources, especially salmon.

== Chief and Councillors ==
Chief Councillor: Maureen Nyce
Councillor: Lisa Grant
Councillor: Deanna Gray
Councillor: Paul Gray
Councillor: Kimberly Robinson
Councillor: Joanne Ross
Councillor: Wade Smith

== Treaty Process/Land Claims ==
The Haisla Nation did not sign a historic treaty with the Crown and is one of many First Nations in British Columbia whose traditional territory remains subject to modern treaty negotiations. According to The Canadian Encyclopedia, Haisla traditional territory includes the Douglas Channel, Gardner Canal, Devastation Channel, Princess Royal Channel, and the Kitimat and Kemano river watersheds. During the late nineteenth century, the federal government established reserve lands for Haisla communities near present-day Kitamaat Village and Kitimat as part of broader reserve policies implemented throughout British Columbia.

In the 1950s, the Government of British Columbia approved the development of the town of Kitimat as a major industrial center. The construction of aluminum production facilities by Rio Tinto Alcan, hydroelectric infrastructure, and transportation networks occurred within Haisla traditional territory. These projects contributed to increased industrial development in the region and altered land use patterns in areas historically used by the Haisla Nation. In later decades, Haisla Nation participated in consultation processes and economic agreements related to regional industrial and energy development projects, including liquefied natural gas initiatives near Kitimat.

The Haisla Nation entered the British Columbia treaty process in December 1993 and formally moved into negotiations in 1994. Treaty negotiations have included discussions involving land ownership, governance authority, resource management, and economic development. According to the Government of British Columbia, the 2015 Incremental Treaty Agreement transferred approximately 120 hectares of provincial Crown land to the Haisla Nation as an interim measure while negotiations toward a final treaty continued. The agreement stated that it did not resolve broader Aboriginal rights or title claims.

As of 2024, the Haisla Nation remains in Stage 4 of the British Columbia treaty process, known as negotiation of an Agreement in Principle, and no final treaty has been reached. The British Columbia Treaty Commission states that Haisla has overlapping and/or shared territory with Allied Tribes of Lax Kw’alaams, Gitxsan Hereditary Chiefs, Gitxaala, Heiltsuk, Nisga’a, Nuxalk, Tsimshian First Nations, and Wet’suwet’en Hereditary Chiefs.

== Economic Development ==
The Haisla band council was described as "decidedly pro-business", supporting a liquefied natural gas (LNG) export project proposed by Apache Canada Ltd., and also gained equity in the BC LNG Export Cooperative.

The Douglas Channel region has been targeted as tidewater for oil and gas export.

=== Douglas Channel Energy Partners ===
In 2004 the Houston-based firm Douglas Channel Energy Partners (DCEP) approached the corporate arm of Haisla band council regarding a potential construction project for a barge-based LNG facility. In 2011, HN DC LNG LP, a limited partnership, was formed for the Haisla Nation to engage in and benefit from western Canada's liquefied natural gas industry. In February 2012, the National Energy Board approved the LNG co-op's project, "which will export up to 26 million tonnes of the supercooled gas over 20 years, with a single train that can process 125 million cubic feet of gas per day slated to begin operations in 2013."

=== Enbridge Northern Gateway ===
Kitamaat Village on Haisla First Nation traditional land would be the location of the Kitimat terminus, where oils sands' raw bitumen would be pumped onto Pacific Ocean supertankers if Enbridge's Northern Gateway pipeline project is approved.

=== Cedar LNG ===
Since 2023, the Haisla have partnered with Pembina Pipeline to develop the $4 billion Cedar LNG project.

== Notable people ==
- Eden Robinson - Author
- Darren "Young D" Metz - Rapper
- Quinton "Yung Trybez" Nyce - Rapper
