= Haisla people =

Haisla
x̄áʼisla
- Haisla National Council Logo

Total population
- 2023

Regions with significant populations
- British Columbia

Languages
- English, Haisla

Religion
- Native, Christianity

Related ethnic groups
- Heiltsuk, Wuikinuxv, Kwakiutl

The Haisla (Haisla: x̄áʼisla, lit. 'dwellers downriver') are a First Nation who reside in Kitamaat. The Haisla consist of two bands: the Kitamaat people, residing in upper Douglas Channel and Devastation Channel, and the Kitlope People, inhabiting upper Princess Royal Channel and Gardner Canal in British Columbia, Canada.

The Kitamaat people identify themselves as Haisla, meaning "dwellers downriver". The term Kitamaat originates from the Tsimshian people. In Tsimshian, the name Kitamaat means "people of the snow".

The Haisla language is officially named X̄aʼislak̓ala. Historically, the Haisla, along with their neighboring Wuikinuxv and Heiltsuk peoples, were mistakenly identified as the Northern Kwakiutl.

== Naming ==
The name Kitamaat became misrepresented in 1955 when Alcan Industries entered to build an aluminium smelter in their territory. Attempting to bring a new face to the territory, Alcan called it the "town of the future" and changed the spelling to Kitimat. The Haisla name for Kitamaat Village is Tsee-Motsa (Cʼimaucʼa), meaning Snag Beach.

== Location ==
Kitamaat Village, which serves as the Haisla reserve, is located a 20-minute drive south of Kitimat town. Kitimat is known for housing the aluminum smelter of Rio Tinto Alcan and is situated at the head of the Douglas Channel, a fjord spanning 90 km (56 mi) that acts as a saltwater corridor connecting the community, the town, and the port of Kitimat to the Pacific Ocean. The name "Kitamaat" originated from the Tsimshian people, as European explorers sought the name of the place from their Tsimshian guides. It translates to "people of the snows" or "place of the snows". Throughout their territory, the Haisla people have occupied various village sites for centuries.

The governing body representing the Haisla people is the Haisla Nation, with its administrative offices located in Kitamaat Village.

A canoe crafted by Haisla members of the Kitimat Athlete club holds cultural significance. It was donated as a gift to the UBC Museum of Anthropology in 1948, where it remains on display to this day.

Ellis Ross was elected to Haisla Nation Council in 2003 and became Chief Councillor in 2011. During his tenure, he advocated for liquefied natural gas (LNG) development in the Kitimat area as a means of creating employment, generating lease revenue and increasing the Nation's economic independence. In a 2016 interview with The Globe and Mail, Ross identified the proposed LNG Canada terminal as an important potential source of economic benefits for the Haisla. He also reiterated the Nation's opposition to the Northern Gateway oil pipeline project, citing the risks of a diluted-bitumen spill in Douglas Channel.

Ross resigned as Chief Councillor in September 2016 to pursue the BC Liberal Party nomination in Skeena. Crystal Smith succeeded him as acting Chief Councillor and was elected to the position in June 2017. As of November 2026, the elected Chief Councillor is Maureen Nyce.

== Haisla clan system ==
In the past, the Haisla people were organized into six clans, each named after an animal that held cultural significance for the tribe. It is believed that the Crow clan, the sixth clan, nearly disappeared and merged with the Raven clan. Within each clan, there was a principal chief, known as Xay'mas, who led their respective tribe. These chiefs would convene whenever necessary to discuss matters that impacted the entire tribe. They played an active role in the lives of their clan members, overseeing important aspects such as arranging beneficial marriages, distributing wealth, and fostering alliances between clans. Chiefs were allowed to have multiple wives, and widows of deceased chiefs could be inherited by the succeeding chief.

The Haisla people were among the few indigenous nations in northern North America that had a hierarchical class system, comprising noblemen, commoners, and slaves. Noblemen enjoyed privileges such as participating in secret rituals and having authority over commoners and slaves in labor activities. The nobility could be identified by their piercings, with boys wearing earlobe piercings and girls sporting lower lip piercings. Commoners had freedom in their way of life but did not partake in tribal governance. Slaves, typically captured during warfare, were expected to be entirely subservient and could be killed at the owner's discretion.

Clan membership followed a maternal inheritance system, with titles and inheritance passing from uncle to nephew rather than from father to son. This clan system is believed to have been inherited through the migration of Tsimshian women as they integrated with various northern tribes. Each clan possessed its own unique creation story alongside the overall tribe's creation narrative.

The Haisla clans were as follows:

1. Eagle (ai 'ǐksdukuyinihu, also known as Owl Clan) Crests: eagle, sea otter, ermine, owl, shag, hawk, and halibut. Clan cry/call: hai hai (imitation of the eagle scream)
2. Beaver (gĭtsǎ'k [Tsimshian], kaulu'n [Haisla equivalent], also known as Dogfish Clan) Crests: beaver, dorsal fin of a dogfish, fireweed, beavers' house, human figure holding its knees, k!yEk!a'n (giant beaver), posts or hat rings carved to look like beaver cuttings. Clan cry/call: t'am t'am (imitating a beaver hitting its tail on the water)
3. Raven (giga'k!eni) Crests: raven, åsEwĕ'lgit (seated human figure with human faces carved or painted onto palms, ears, knees, and feet), head and beak of a raven, gosEmdela'h (figure of a man placed head down in the entranceway during a Raven feast, with added human hair touching the raven chief). Clan cry/call: Gax gax (sound of raven croaking)
4. Blackfish (Killer Whale/Orca) (hå'låxaini, also known as Grizzly Bear Clan) Crests: blackfish, dorsal fin of a blackfish, grizzly bear, twilight (red sky of the evening), human figure with another human figure at its breast (walai'gĭtlah), giant deep-sea bear (sa'nis), kelp heads, bu'sbakah (type of sea plant), bŭgwi's and bŭgwå's (merman and mermaid resembling humans or monkeys), mountain goat with only one horn, fireweed. Clan cry/call: hŏc

== G'psgolox totem pole ==
The G'psgolox totem pole is attached with a legend. It is told that, in 1872, a smallpox epidemic infected the people of the Haisla Nation (located in the north of what we now call British Columbia), killing the vast majority of inhabitants. The leader of the Eagle Clan of the Haisla tribe, named Chief G'psgolox, lost his whole family due to the epidemic, as well as many of his friends. The legend tells that the bereaved Chief G'spgolox travelled to the forest and attempted to find help there. There, he met with the spirits Tsooda and Zola, who told the Chief to go to the edge of a mountain at dawn, where he would see his deceased loved ones and learn to heal those still living. In the legend, this is how Chief G'psgolox complied and gained vital knowledge, learning the nature of the spirits, the Haisla spirit of continuance and transition. In appreciation of the spirits' help, Chief G'spgolox commissioned a nine-meter-tall totem pole with three figures. The bottom two figures commemorate the deceased and the top figure represents the Tsooda spirit. The pole, while commemorating the dead, told the tale of Haisla survival. It later became known as The G’psgolox Pole.

In 1928 Olof Hanson, the Swedish vice-president to British Columbia, submitted a request to the Canadian Department of Indian Affairs to acquire a pole, and in 1929, Olof was granted permission to cut down a totem pole and take it to Sweden. Olof Hanson chose the G'spgolox totem pole and cut it at the base. Olof Hanson took the pole while the Haisla were away due to seasonal living patterns, leaving the Haisla confused and wondering what had happened to the pole. The Norwegian emigrant named Iver Fougner (1870–1947) who chopped down the pole was employed as an Indian agent. He was a contact person between the authorities and Indigenous peoples in the vast district. Olof donated the G’psgolox Pole to the Swedish National Museum of Ethnography that same year. The museum had the pole in storage for many years until they had a proper building to display it in 1980. The pole was on display in this building for 25 years.

When some members of the Haisla Nation heard rumours that the pole may have been up for display in Sweden, it was decided that Louisa Smith and Gerald Amos should travel to Sweden to investigate the rumours. Once they had confirmed that the pole on display was the G’psgolox Pole, the Haisla nation asked for its repatriation. In 1992, a member of the Museum of Ethnography travelled to the Haisla village in British Columbia, where he was told by the Haisla people that the pole was stolen from them and that they had been avidly searching for it without success since the theft in 1929. He was also told that, since the pole was found, it had to be returned to its rightful owners. The Haisla people offered to carve an identical totem replica in exchange for the original. The museum agreed to the proposal by the Haisla people. This led to the Swedish government granting permission for the museum to gift the totem pole to the Haisla people in 1994, with the condition that the replica be an exact match to the original. In 2000, the Haisla community completed two replicas of the pole. One of the replicas were given to Sweden, while the other was placed where the G’psgolox Pole once stood. The poles were carved by Henry Robertson and his sisters sons Derek and Barry Wilson. The Haisla nation also build a historical preservation centre in the Kitamaat Village that would host the original pole.

In 2006, after 77 years at the museum, the pole arrived at the Kitamaat Village in British Columbia. In the shopping mall where it was placed, school children could listen to the elders telling the history of the pole. In 2012, the Kitlope Eagle clan chief decided to move the pole to an old graveyard close to the original location of the pole, where it was left to disintegrate.

== Oolichan fishing ==
Oolichan is a smelt fish that is so oily that the oil can burn like a candle, hence they are also known as candlefish. For many West Coast Nations, the oolichan has been known as the saviour fish, representing fresh food after a long winter. Oolichan grease was one of the most valuable resources to the Haisla, a valuable commodity for trading with other tribes. The process of extracting the fat is to boil the oolichan in large cedar boxes until the grease separates from the meat and rises to the top. The fat is then skimmed off and poured into other containers for storage, to be traded later or eaten throughout the year. Making Oolican oil/grease is very labour-intensive, and would often involve the entire tribe. Women were in charge of making the nets for catching oolichan. Nets were made from harvesting stinging nettles and spinning the fiber into twine. Knitting the intricate nets usually took about three months; when finished, they measured 50 feet long, and 24 feet wide at the mouth, narrowing to 2 feet. When the oolichan nets were made with care, they could last more than 10 years.

== Potlatch and feasting ==
The potlatch began with the introduction of the mass production of goods within indigenous settlements along the Canadian Pacific coast, mainly British Columbia as well as some parts of the United States such as Oregon and Washington. The potlach word comes from the Chinook jargon that was mainly used for trading purposes in the villages along the Pacific coast of Canada, and it means to “give”. The increases in wealth during this period increased the wealth of many individuals within the indigenous communities. Many individuals that had accumulated large amounts of wealth felt that by giving away their wealth they could gain a higher social status within their community. The potlatch is a ceremony that marks a feast that celebrates a special event such as redressing family dishonor, funerals, births, and marriage. Indigenous people along the Canadian and US Pacific coast have been practicing these rites for hundreds of years and these ceremonies often last a few days. Historically, the potlatch was a very important social event for the Haisla people. The potlatch served to redistribute goods throughout the tribe. Giving away material wealth at a potlatch was the most significant way of maintaining and improving social standing. These types of ceremonies are an important part of the indigenous culture and is not uncommon for the host indigenous nation of the potlatch to secure a loan to accommodate for needs and necessities of their guests during the festivities. Some of the activities that take place during these ceremonies are dancing, singing, storytelling, and feasting. The purpose of these rituals is to get indigenous nations together and to build stronger social and cultural ties. For this reason, the hosts of the potlach usually give away most or all of their wealth as by doing so boosts their social status within their community and secures a place for them in their cultural social hierarchy. The potlatch requires so much material goods that often clans would need to work together in order to make and gather enough supplies to host a potlatch.

== Dances ==
Dances are normally performed during wintertime at great feasts and potlatches. The Haisla have a series of dances that they perform, which are ranked from the lowest to highest. The lowest dances are usually performed by younger members and commoners, while the higher dances are reserved for nobles and chiefs. Participants in the dance are recognized by the “five vertical streaks on both sides of the face”. The three highest dances are secret, called hai'likula (a word meaning magical or shamanistic) and commoners are not permitted to know the details. Jesters are used to entertain the crowd as dancers would make their preparations behind a screen. They also dance in select dances. The position of jester is hereditary via the matrilineal line. The preparation for the higher dances is reserved for nobleman and woman, as they are the only members of the tribe that are permitted to witness these preparations. Although noblewomen were not permitted to dance in the higher dances, they were involved in helping with the preparations. These highest three dances also include the use of whistles and rattles, and the tone of the whistle is distinctive to the dance being performed. Members of the two highest dances are thought to possess magical powers.

Series of Dances, starting with the lowest:

1. Mitla
  This dance is usually performed by younger nobles and commoners into advanced years. Most adult nobleman would have long “graduated” from performing this dance, unless he is childless and/or unable to pass on the dance.
2. Glo'ala'ha ("came down a second time")
  This dance, like the Mitla, is a common dance.
3. Ula'la
  This is the highest of the common dances, and you must be a potential noble to dance. These participants are permitted to witness preparations for the higher dances. The dancers are usually sons of nobleman, who wish to begin preparing them for the higher dances.
4. Nutlåm
  The Hisla people believe that this dance originated at Kemano with the (Kitlope) tribe. This is referred to the dog-eater dance, and participants adorn dog skulls when dancing. The number of skulls worn is determined by the number of dogs that the individual has killed and devoured. Historically, the Haisla people believed eating dog meat or human flesh was poisonous. Those who were able to ingest the meat and survive were seen as special.
5. Nu'ntlsista (meaning dizzy or crazy)
  This dance is also referred to as the fire dance. It is considered the second most important dance to the Haisla people. In this dance, the dancers wear their hair matted and act crazy. If anyone in the audience smiles, laughs or speaks they are set upon by the dancers. To demonstrate their might, dancers will walk on hot coals. You must be a nobleman to participate in this dance.
6. Tanish
  A Haihais word meaning cannibal or man-eater. The right to participate in the Tanish dance is by inheritance only, with a few exceptions such as a dowry gift. Women are not allowed to dance, but they help with preparations for this dance and act as attendants.

== Language ==
The Haisla language is spoken by the descendants of the Gitamaat and Kitlope bands from the Kitimat area of the northern coast of British Columbia. It is a Northern Wakashan language spoken by several hundred people, and is geographically the northernmost Wakashan language. Its nearest Wakashan neighbour is Oowekyala. Haisla is related to the other North Wakashan languages of Wuikyala, Heiltsuk, and Kwak'wala. It consists of two dialects, sometimes defined as sublanguages: Kitamaat and Kitlope (also known as X̣enaksialak’ala). Haisla names are written in a phonemic alphabet that allows the language's sounds to be distinguished from that of other indigenous people. Several scientific alphabets have been used for writing Haisla, and a transcription system devised by Emmon Bach is used to be able to read the Haisla inscriptions.

Recent efforts to revitalize the Haisla language have focused on expanding community-based instruction and increasing access to digital learning resources. Among these efforts are the Haisla Nation Culture and Heritage Department oversees language programming that provides instruction for community members across multiple age groups, including early childhood learners, school-aged students, adults, and elders. The department also organizes cultural education programs, workshops, and seasonal culture camps that incorporate language learning alongside traditional practices, oral storytelling, and cultural teachings.

Digital preservation initiatives have expanded access to Haisla language materials through online platforms. The Haisla language is featured on platforms like FirstVoices, a digital archive created to support Indigenous language preservation in Canada. The Haisla archive includes vocabulary databases, recorded pronunciations, songs, stories, and phrase collections designed to support both classroom instruction and independent language learning. FirstVoices has developed mobile dictionary applications and keyboard tools intended to improve accessibility for new speakers and community members living outside Kitamaat Village.

In 2020, Haisla Nation partnered with the First Nations Education Foundation on a language documentation project intended to record approximately 10,000 Haisla words with the assistance of fluent elders. Organizers stated that the project was developed in response to declining numbers of fluent speakers and was intended to support future curriculum development, pronunciation preservation, and long-term language documentation efforts.

== In popular culture ==
- The novel Monkey Beach, by Canadian author Eden Robinson, follows the lives of a Haisla teenager and her family.
- Son of a Trickster by Eden Robinson was released in 2017. This novel follows Jared through his grade 10 years in Kitimat and his first encounters with magic. The Canadian television series Trickster, based on the novel, premiered in 2020.
- The Snotty Nose Rez Kids, a Hip Hop duo from the Haisla Nation, won the Juno Award for Indigenous Music Album of the Year in 2019.

== Notable people ==
- Barry Wilson (born 1952), artist
