= Museum of Ethnography, Sweden =

Museum in Stockholm, Sweden

The Museum of Ethnography
- Etnografiska museet

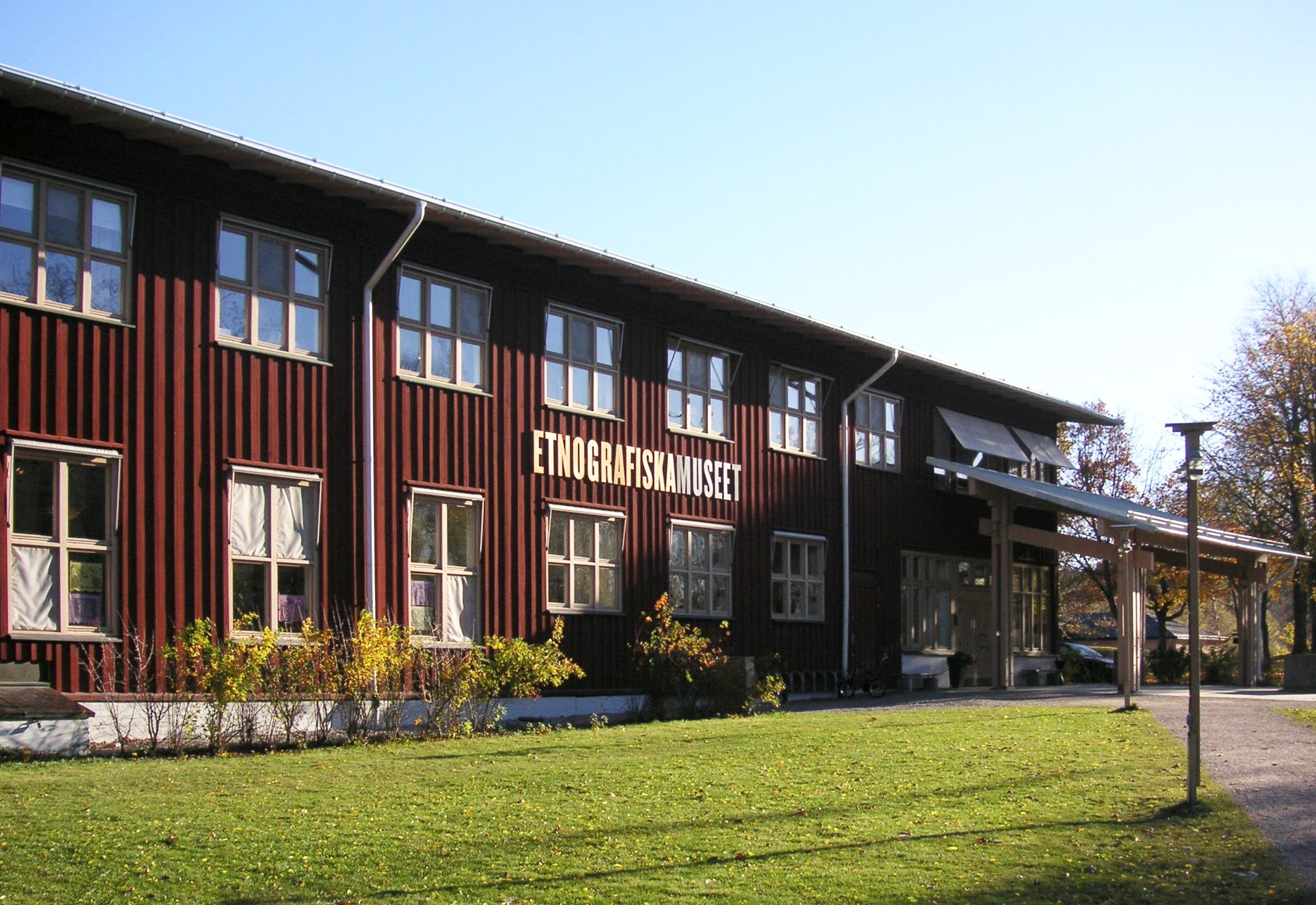
- Museum of Ethnography
- Location: Stockholm, Sweden
- Coordinates: 59°19′57″N 18°07′14″E
- Website: varldskulturmuseerna.se/etnografiskamuseet

The Museum of Ethnography (Swedish: Etnografiska museet), in Stockholm, Sweden, is a Swedish science museum. It houses a collection of about 220,000 items relating to the ethnography, or cultural anthropology, of peoples from around the world, including from China, Korea, South and Southeast Asia, the Pacific region, the Americas and Africa. The museum is situated in Museiparken at Gärdet in Stockholm. Since 1999, it is a part of Swedish National Museums of World Culture and is also hosting the Sven Hedin Foundation. The museum is open Tuesday to Sunday 11:00AM – 5:00 PM, and Wednesdays 11:00 AM – 8:00 PM and is closed on Mondays.

Among the oldest collections at the museum are objects gathered in the Swedish colony New Sweden and during the Cook expeditions in the 18th century. However, the main part stems from the period 1850–1950 and is heavily influenced by the colonial era explorations, evangelisations and trade. From 1874 on, the curator of the vertebrae collections at the Swedish Museum of Natural History, zoologist Fredrik Adam Smitt (1839-1904) was made responsible for the ethnographic collections. In 1900 Hjalmar Stolpe became the first director of the newly founded Museum of Ethnography, that was a now independent branch of the Natural History Museum. The museum was moved to a new building in 1930. The current building replaced the older one and was opened in 1980 (Architects Jan Gezelius and Gunnar Mattsson).

In 1988, the museum's name changed to Folkens Museum, but was changed back in 2001, two years after the National Museums of World Culture were formed.

In 2007, after several years of negotiation, the museum agreed to return a totem pole to the Haisla Nation, from which it had been taken in 1929. The Haisla nation gave the museum a contemporary replica of the pole, currently on display outside the museum's entrance. The museum has also returned a number of other objects to their country of origin. All current artifacts in the museum are considered national property and so the museum has a right and a responsibility to display and preserve these artifacts.

The museum is expanding on its collection with the addition of a digital exhibition. This exhibition explores the role and significance of birds in material culture, society and somolog.

== See also ==
- Museums in Stockholm
- Zui-Ki-Tei, a Japanese tea ceremony house in the park outside the Museum of Ethnography
