= Kitamaat Village =

First Nations settlement in Canada

Coordinates: 53°58′50″N 128°38′50″W

Kitamaat Village, formerly Kitimat Mission, is the principal community of the Haisla people and their government, the Haisla Nation. Located on the Kitamaat 2 First Nations Reserve (formerly Kitimat 2) on the east side of Kitimat Arm just south of the town of Kitimat, British Columbia. The location is also that of the Haisla Post Office. The "Kitamaat" part of the name comes from the Tsimshian people, who originate from the Prince Rupert and Metlakatla areas. "Kitamaat" means "people of the snow" in Tsimshian, but the Haisla name for Kitamaat Village is "Tsee-Motsa", meaning "Snag Beach".

== Notable people ==
- Darren "Young D" Metz, member of Snotty Nose Rez Kids
- Quinton "Yung Trybez" Nyce, member of Snotty Nose Rez Kids

== See also ==
- List of communities in British Columbia
