= Loretta Todd =

Canadian film director

Loretta Sarah Todd is a Canadian Indigenous documentary filmmaker. Her films have been screened at the Sundance Film Festival, the Toronto International Film Festival (TIFF), the American Indian Film Festival (San Francisco), the Yamagata International Documentary Film Festival, and in the Museum of Modern Art.

Todd’s work encompasses Indigenous media. Todd herself is Indigenous Cree/Metis.

== Career ==
=== Filmography ===
- Halfway House
- Breaking Camp
- Robes of Power
- Blue Neon
- The Storyteller in the City
- Day Glo Wrestler
- Eagle Run
- The Healing Circle
- Taking Care of Our Own
- The Learning Path
- Hands of History
- Voice-Life
- No More Secrets
- Through the Lens: an Alternative Look at Filmmaking (1996)
- Forgotten Warriors (1997)
- Today is a Good Day (1999)
- Kainayssini Imanistaisiwa: The People Go On (2003)
- Tansi! Nehiyawetan (2011)
- Skye & Chang pilot (2014)
- Coyote’s Crazy Smart Science Show (2017)
- Fierce Girls (2018)
- Monkey Beach (2020)

== Selected awards and nominations ==
- Rockefeller Fellow
- ImagineNATIVE Lifetime Achievement Award
- Taos Mountain Award for Lifetime Achievement
- Sundance Scriptwriters Lab
- Chicago International Film Festival - Silver Hugo for The Learning Path.
- Two Rivers Film Festival - New Visionary Award for The Learning Path.
- American Film and Video Festival - Blue Ribbon for The Learning Path.
- Genie Award - Best Short Documentary nomination for Forgotten Warriors
- American Indian Film Festival - Winner for Best Live Short: Subject for Skye & Chang (2013)
- Women in Film & Television Vancouver’s Spotlight Awards - Winner 2018 Innovation Award
- American Indian Film Festival - Best Documentary Film for Today is a Good Day: Remembering Chief Dan George
- American Indian Film Festival - Best Documentary Film for Forgotten Warriors
- HotDocs - Best History Documentary for Forgotten Warriors
