= Outdoor literature =

Literary genre about or involving the outdoors

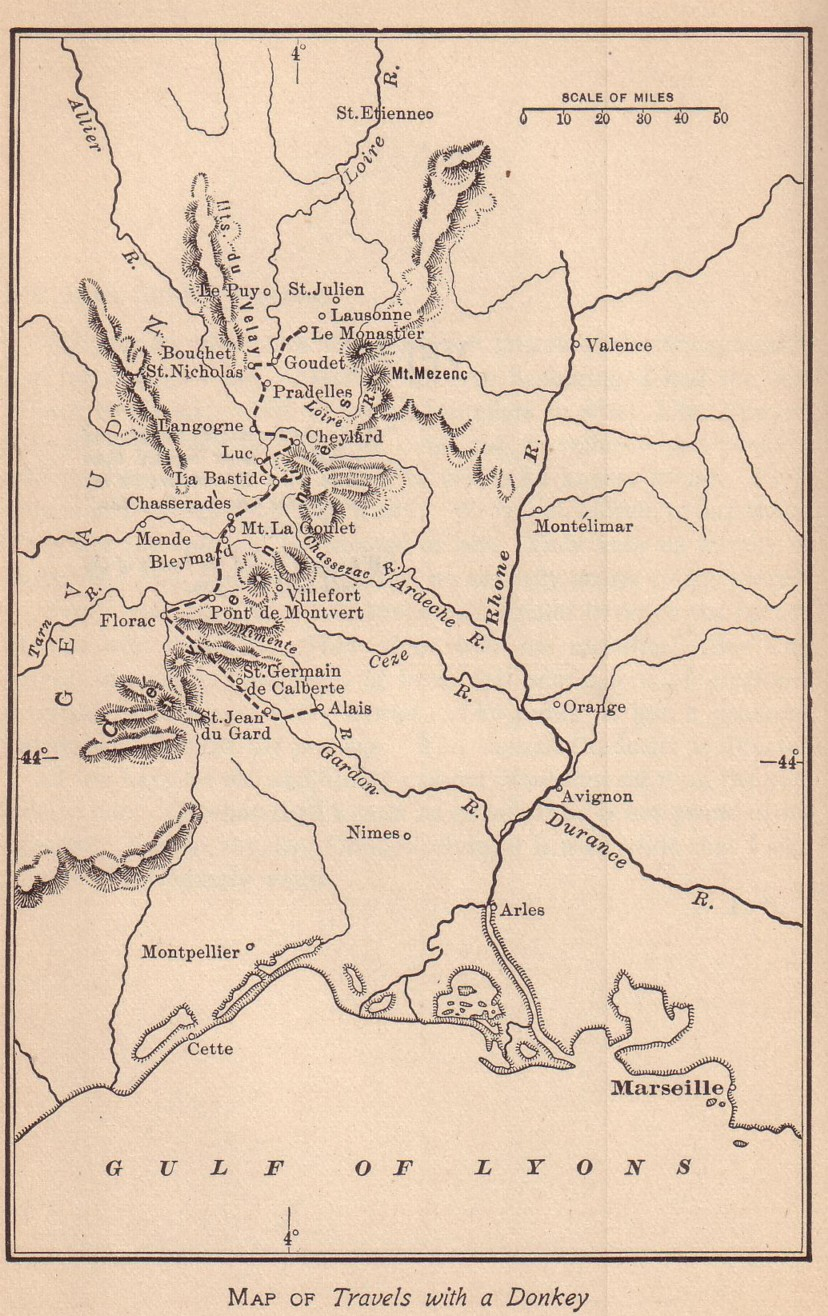
Map of Robert Louis Stevenson's walking route, taken from Travels with a Donkey in the Cévennes (1879), a pioneering classic of outdoor literature

Outdoor literature is a literature genre about or involving the outdoors. Outdoor literature encompasses several different subgenres including exploration literature, adventure literature and nature writing. Another subgenre is the guide book, an early example of which was Thomas West's guide to the Lake District published in 1778. The genres can include activities such as exploration, survival, sailing, hiking, mountaineering, whitewater boating, geocaching or kayaking, or writing about nature and the environment. Travel literature is similar to outdoor literature but differs in that it does not always deal with the out-of-doors, but there is a considerable overlap between these genres, in particular with regard to long journeys.

== History ==
Henry David Thoreau's Walden (1854) is an early and influential work. Although not entirely an outdoor work (he lived in a cabin close to civilization) he expressed the ideas of why people go out into the wilderness to camp, backpack and hike: to get away from the rush of modern society and simplify life. This was a new perspective for the time and thus Walden has had a lasting influence on most outdoor authors.

Thoreau's careful observations and devastating conclusions have rippled into time, becoming stronger as the weaknesses Thoreau noted have become more pronounced […] Events that seem to be completely unrelated to his stay at Walden Pond have been influenced by it, including the national park system, the British labour movement, the creation of India, the civil rights movement, the hippie revolution, the environmental movement, and the wilderness movement. Today, Thoreau's words are quoted with feeling by liberals, socialists, anarchists, libertarians, and conservatives alike.

— Ken Kifer

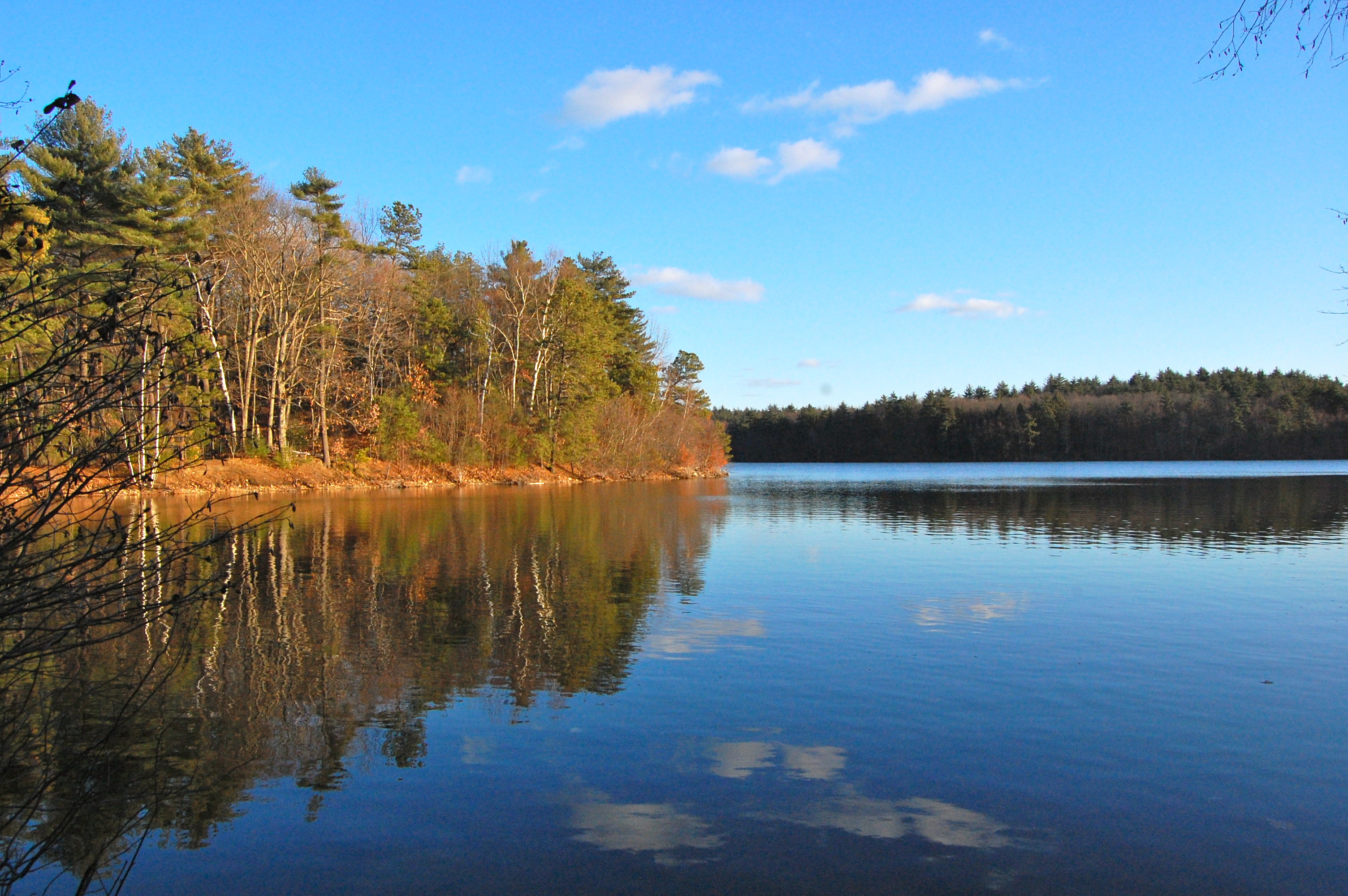
Walden Pond

Robert Louis Stevenson's Travels with a Donkey in the Cévennes (1879), about his travels in Cévennes (France), is among the first popular books to present hiking and camping as recreational activities, and tells of commissioning one of the first sleeping bags.

In the world of sailing Frank Cowper's Sailing Tours (1892–1896) and Joshua Slocum's Sailing Alone Around the World (1900) are classics of outdoor literature.

In April 1895, Joshua Slocum set sail from Boston, Massachusetts and in Sailing Alone Around the World, he described his departure:

I had resolved on a voyage around the world, and as the wind on the morning of April 24, 1895 was fair, at noon I weighed anchor, set sail, and filled away from Boston, where the Spray had been moored snugly all winter. […] A thrilling pulse beat high in me. My step was light on deck in the crisp air. I felt there could be no turning back, and that I was engaging in an adventure the meaning of which I thoroughly understood.

More than three years later, on June 27, 1898, he returned to Newport, Rhode Island, having circumnavigated the world, a distance of more than 46,000 miles (74,000 km).

The National Outdoor Book Award was established in 1997 as a US-based non-profit program which each year honours the best in outdoor writing and publishing.

== Outdoor classics ==
- 19th century
  - John MacGregor (1866). A Thousand Miles in a Rob Roy Canoe. Considered the first documentation of recreational canoeing.
  - Edward Whymper (1871). Scrambles Amongst the Alps in the Years 1860–1869.
  - Mark Twain (1872). Roughing It. Part real part fiction, classic account of life in the American Old West.
  - Frank Cowper (1892–1896). Sailing Tours. A classic of single-handed cruising.
  - Walter Weston (1896). Mountaineering and Exploration in the Japanese Alps.
- 20th century
  - John Muir, (1911). My First Summer in the Sierra.
  - Grey Owl (1935). Pilgrims of the Wild. About Grey Owl's life in the wilds of Canada.
  - Gontran de Poncins (1939). Kabloona. French adventurer living with Eskimos in the late 1930s.
  - Maurice Herzog (1951). Annapurna: Conquest of the First 8000-metre Peak. Probably the most influential mountaineering expedition book.
  - Wallace Stegner (1954). Beyond the Hundredth Meridian: John Wesley Powell and the Second Opening of the West.
  - Alfred Lansing (1959). Endurance: Shackleton's Incredible Voyage.
  - John Hillaby, Journey to the Jade Sea (1964); Journey through Britain; Journey through Europe; Journey to the Gods (1991). Accounts of various long distance walks.
  - Edward Abbey (1968) Desert Solitaire
  - Colin Fletcher (1968) The Complete Walker
  - Annie Dillard, (1974) Pilgrim at Tinker Creek
  - Patrick Leigh Fermor, A Time of Gifts (1977); Between the Woods and the Water (1986); The Broken Road (2013). A trilogy describing a walk across Europe.
  - Nan Shepherd, (1977). The Living Mountain.
  - Jon Krakauer (1990s). Into the Wild, Into Thin Air.
  - Joe Simpson, Touching the Void (1988). Mountain climbing in the Andes.
- 21st century
  - Jim Perrin, Spirits of Place (1997); The Climbing Essays (2006); West: A Journey through the Landscapes of Loss (2010). A rock climber and travel writer.
  - Bill McKibben (2005) Wandering Home. Also: The End of Nature (1989)
  - Rory Stewart, The Places in Between (2006). A walk across Afghanistan in 2002, after the Russians had left.
  - Cheryl Strayed, Wild: From Lost to Found on the Pacific Crest Trail (2013). Describes the grueling life of the long-distance hiker, the perils of the PCT, and its peculiar community of wanderers.
  - Robert Macfarlane, Mountains of the Mind: A History of a Fascination; The Wild Places; The Old Ways: A Journey on Foot (2012). He is one of a number of recent British writers who have provoked a new critical and popular interest in writing about landscape.

== See also ==
- Boardman Tasker Prize for Mountain Literature – Annual literature award
- Guide book – Book about a place for visitors or tourists
- Nature writing – Nonfiction or fiction prose or poetry about the natural environment, literary genre
- Travel literature – Literary genre
- Banff Mountain Book Festival
