= Kilbella Bay =

Bay in British Columbia, Canada

Coordinates: 51°42′00″N 127°21′00″W

Kilbella Bay is a bay on the Central Coast of British Columbia, Canada, off the north side of Rivers Inlet to the northeast of McAllister Point. A steamer landing formerly operated by the Northland Navigation Company was located on the east side of the bay.

The Kilbella and Chuckwalla Rivers both enter the sea at Kilbella Bay.

The location is within the traditional territory of the Wuikinuxv. Kiltala Indian Reserve No. 2, one of their Indian reserves, is located at the mouth of the Kilbella River.
