= Chuckwalla (disambiguation) =

A chuckwalla is a lizard of the species Sauromalus. Chuckwalla or chuckawalla may also refer to:

== People ==
- Chuckawalla Bill, Spanish–American War and WW I veteran, prospector, cook, and vagabond

== Locations ==
- Chuckwalla Mountains, in the Colorado Desert, California
- Chuckwalla Valley Raceway, a motorsports racetrack in Desert Center, California
- Chuckawalla Valley State Prison, near Blythe, California
- Little Chuckwalla Mountains, in the Colorado Desert, California
- the Chuckwalla River on the Central Coast of British Columbia, Canada
