= Howell-North Books =

- Status: defunct
- Headquarters location: Berkeley, California
- Publication types: books
- Nonfiction topics: railroads, American history

Howell-North Books was a book publishing company based in Berkeley, California. They specialized in American history, in particular railroadiana, the American West, and nautical history. They were active from at least 1959 to 1981.

== Select Bibliography ==
- Mansions on Rails: The Folklore of the Private Rail Car, Lucius Beebe (1959)
- Eight Immortal Flavors: Secrets of Cantonese Cookery from San Francisco's Chinatown, Johnny Kan and Charles L. Leong. (1963)
- The Thousand Mile Summer, Colin Fletcher (1964)
- David F. Myrick, ed. (1958). Reproduction of Thompson and West's History of Nevada 1881, with Illustrations and Biographical Sketches of Its Prominent Men and Pioneers. Berkeley, California: Howell-North Books. ASIN B000EDOHLG.
- Snowplow: Clearing Mountain Rails, Gerald M. Best (1966)
