= Kenton Grua =

Grand Canyon river guide (1950–2002)

Kenton "Factor" Grua (July 25, 1950 – August 25, 2002) was a Grand Canyon river guide. He was the first person in recorded history to hike through the Grand Canyon's entire length. In 1983, he set the speed record for rowing through the canyon in 37 hours.

== Background ==
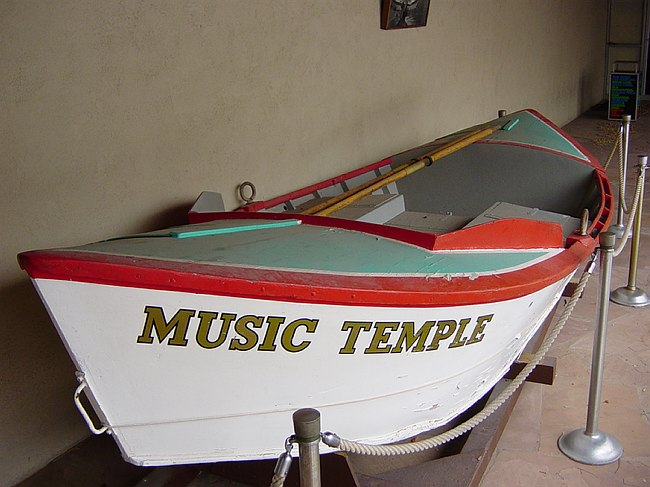
One of Martin Litton's 27 original Grand Canyon Dories. Grua was an early guide for Litton, who pioneered the use of dories in the Grand Canyon in the 1970s.

External images
- Kenton Grua in the 1970s.
- Kenton Grua in the Emerald Mile, the dory used on the speed run.
- Kenton Grua and Georgie White, first professional river guide.
- Kenton Grua in the 2000s.

Kenton Grua was born and raised in Vernal, Utah. At the age of 12, Grua was enthralled by a whitewater rafting trip taken with his father on the Green River, a tributary of the Colorado River. He began college around 1968, but soon dropped out after he was offered a job as a motorman‍—‌a rubber raft guide‍—‌for Ted Hatch in the Grand Canyon. He was soon after hired by Grand Canyon Dories, founded by environmentalist Martin Litton, who piloted a fleet of wooden McKenzie River dories specially modified for the Colorado. His boundless energy, memorable personality and constant experimentation earned Grua a nickname, as historian Lew Steiger explains:

Years ago, his pals nicknamed him 'Factor' because that's what he was ... this additional element you always had to factor in whenever you were on a river trip, or in the warehouse, or anywhere with him ... frequently brilliant, sometimes insane, usually intense ... always a factor.

== Rowing speed-record through the Grand Canyon ==
In 1983, Grua, along with river guides Rudi Petschek and Steve Reynolds, set a record for speed rowing down the 277-mile length of the Colorado River through the Grand Canyon, with a time of 36 hours, 38 minutes and 29 seconds, breaking the previous record of just under 48 hours set in 1980 by Grua, Petschek, and Wally Rist, which in turn broke the record of 52 hours established in 1951 by the Rigg brothers. Normally, trips in motorized rubber rafts take up to a week and dory trips two weeks or more. Grua's 1983 trip took advantage of record-setting seasonal flood waters to propel a specially modified wooden dory called the Emerald Mile along the route. This famous speed run has been recounted in a number of books and articles, including Lew Steiger's story "Speed" in Christa Sadler's book, There's This River ... Grand Canyon Boatman Stories (2006), and Kevin Fedarko's The Emerald Mile: The Epic Story of the Fastest Ride in History Though the Heart of the Grand Canyon (2013). Grua's record stood until 2016, when a team of kayakers made the trip in 35 hours and 5 minutes - that record was broken 2 days later by solo kayaker Ben Orkin bringing the speed to 34 hours and 2 minutes.

== First walk of the Grand Canyon's length ==
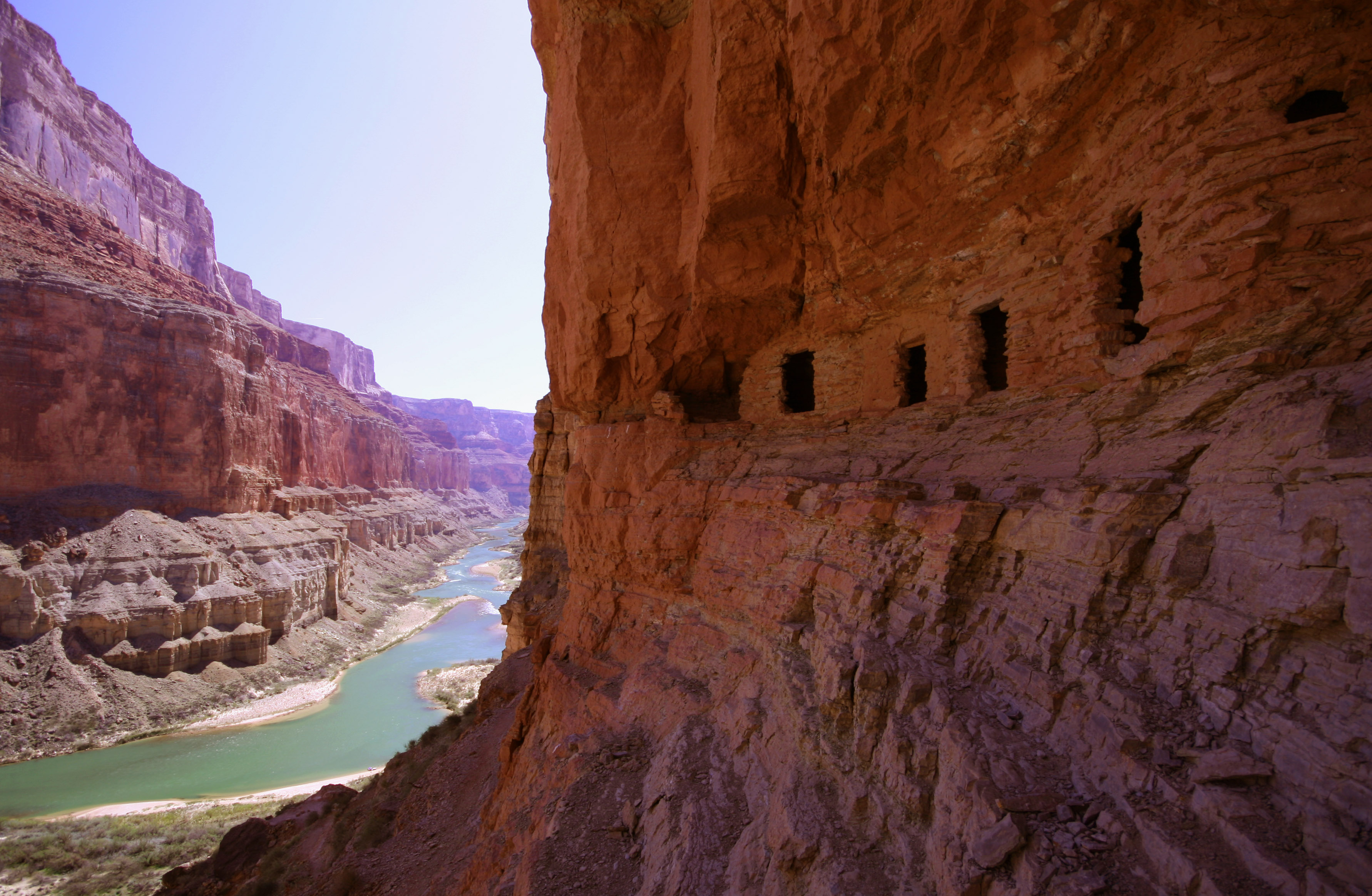
The Anasazi granaries at Nankoweap Creek is typical of the terrain Grua hiked through. He never crossed or swam the river, staying to the south side, often along higher escarpments and cliff faces such as this one. The river rose and fell frequently from the influence of Glen Canyon Dam upstream.

Kenton Grua was the first person in recorded history to walk the entire length of the Grand Canyon. The Colorado River forms the base of the canyon and he walked along or near it from the northern terminus near Lee's Ferry (started at Badger Canyon) to the southern terminus at Grand Wash Cliffs. Grua first had the idea after reading Colin Fletcher's best-seller The Man Who Walked Through Time (1968) in which Fletcher hiked the length of the Canyon inside Grand Canyon National Park, the first person to do so. However, this was only about half the length of the canyon, because when Fletcher conducted his trip in 1963, the National Park did not include the entire length of the canyon (it was later expanded). Others had hiked large portions of the canyon in multiple sections over a number of years. Grua wanted to "do it right" by hiking the entire canyon in a single trip.

Grua's work as a professional river guide allowed him to scout potential routes, which he did for a number of years before his first attempt in the fall of 1971‍—‌soon abandoned because of an infection after he stepped on a cactus. He made his second attempt in 1976, after caching food at various points along the route. During this walk (staying south of the Colorado) he discovered many ancient Anasazi signs that were upwards of one thousand years old‍—‌mezcal pit ovens for making alcohol, granary rooms for storing food‍—‌showing that parts of the route had been used before. Some sections were perilous goat trails, hundreds of feet above the river, in otherwise sheer rock cliffs.

Grua reached the end of the canyon, Grand Wash Cliffs, on April 4, 1976, exactly five weeks after he had begun. He estimated he had actually hiked about 409 miles because of the circuitous route required by the canyon's treacherous topography and the need to return to the river periodically for drinking water. Unlike Fletcher who wrote a best-selling book and became a hiking icon, Grua did little to publicize his accomplishment, which went largely unnoticed until much later, other than among his fellow river guides. Elias Butler (2007) said it was "one of the greatest hiking accomplishments in Grand Canyon history, though he has received little publicity for it."

== Death and legacy ==
In 1988, Grua founded and was the first president of Grand Canyon River Guides, "a non-profit educational and environmental organization that weighs in on issues ranging from operation of Glen Canyon Dam to uranium mining near the rim, from overflight noise to quiet motors."

Grua died at 52 years of age from a spontaneous aortic dissection while mountain biking on lower Schultz Creek Trail, near his home in Flagstaff, Arizona. He was survived by his wife and step-children.

The Whale Foundation offers the Kenton Grua Memorial Scholarship, benefiting Grand Canyon river guides who are pursuing further education.
