= International Rafting Federation =

- Abbreviation: IRF
- Formation: 1997
- Founded at: Augsburg, Germany
- Type: Sports federation
- Legal status: Nonprofit NGO
- Purpose: Sports governing body
- Headquarters: Legal address: Boise, Idaho, United States
- Region served: Worldwide
- Official language: English
- President: Joseph Willis Jones
- Main organ: Congress
- Website: internationalrafting.com

The International Rafting Federation (IRF) is the official umbrella International Sports Federation for national rafting organizations worldwide, and administers all aspects of rafting sport worldwide. The World Rafting Championships (WRC), the European Rafting Championships (ERC), the Pan American Rafting Championships, and the Euro Cup rafting series are governed by the IRF. The IRF works closely with national organisations and government bodies by offering the only raft guide certification program accepted worldwide. In 2019 the IRF was awarded Observer Status by the Global Association of International Sports Federations (GAISF).

== Disciplines ==
- Raft Sprint (formerly Time Trial)
- Raft Head-to-Head
- Raft Slalom
- Raft Downriver

== Age Divisions ==
- Masters - ages 40+
- Youth - ages 15–19
- Junior - ages 15–23
- Open - ages 15+

== Executive Committee ==
- Mr. Joseph Willis Jones, President and Chair of Board of Directors
- Mr. Eric Boudreau, First Vice President, Chair of Sport and Competition
- Mr. Gaspar Goncz, Second Vice President, Chair of Guide Training and Education
- Ms. Jasmina Marčok, Treasurer and Chief Financial Officer
- Ms. Sue Liell-Cock, Secretary General
