= Rafting =

Recreational outdoor activity

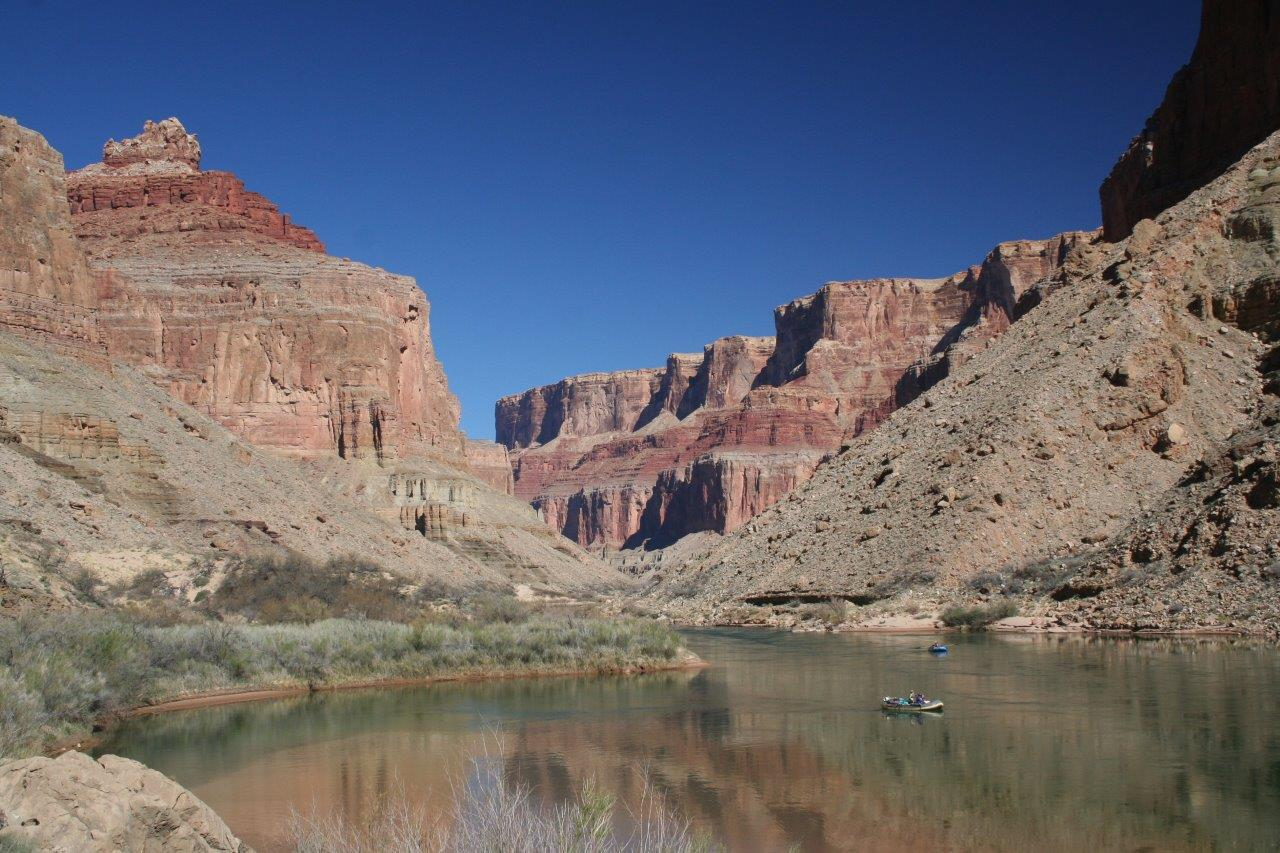
Rafting in Grand Canyon, USA

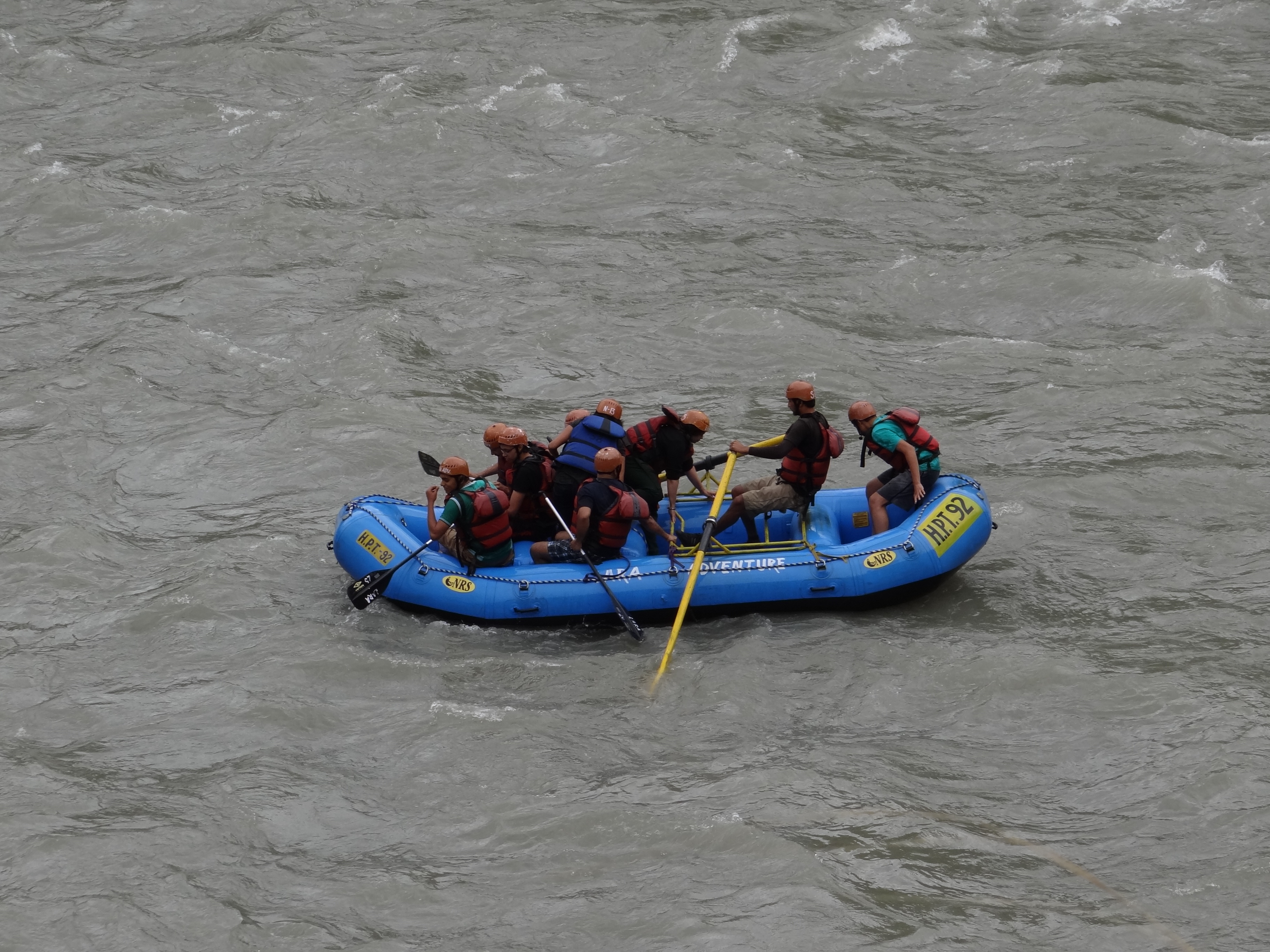
Rafting in Himachal Pradesh, India

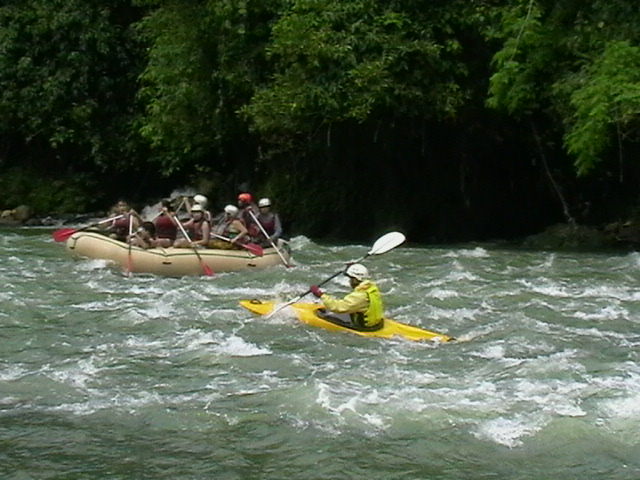
Whitewater rafting along the Cagayan de Oro River, Philippines

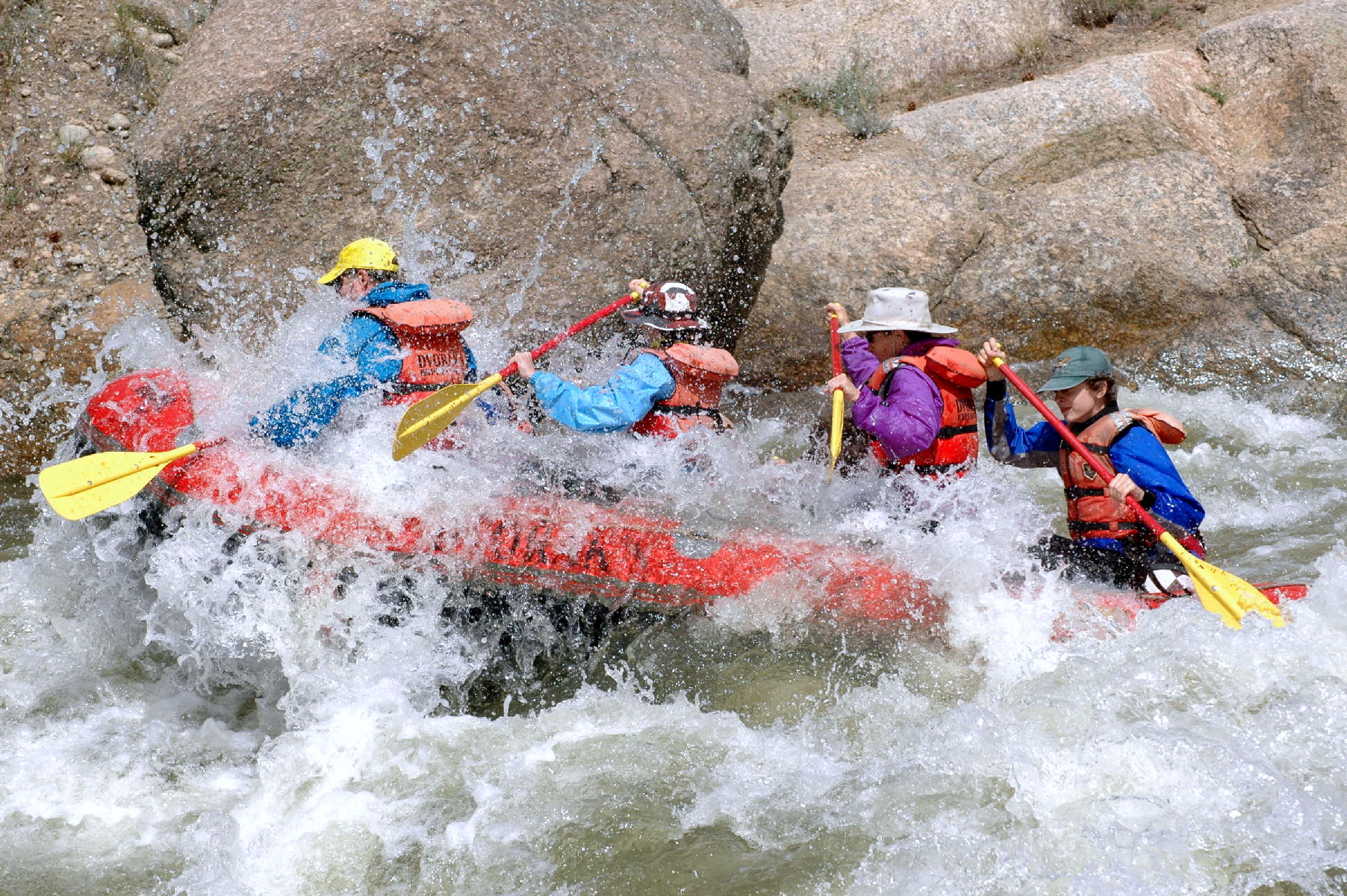
Rafting on the Arkansas River, Colorado, US

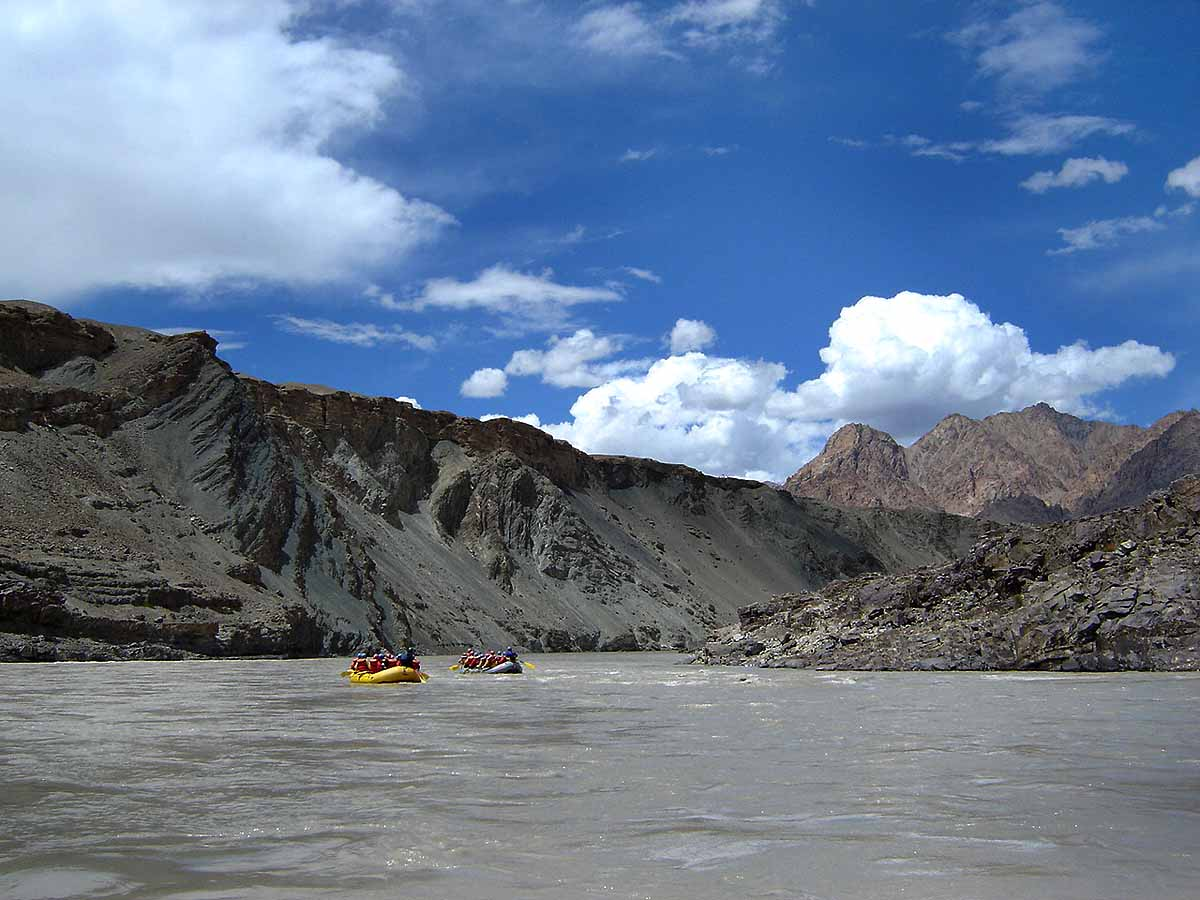
Rafting in Ladakh, India

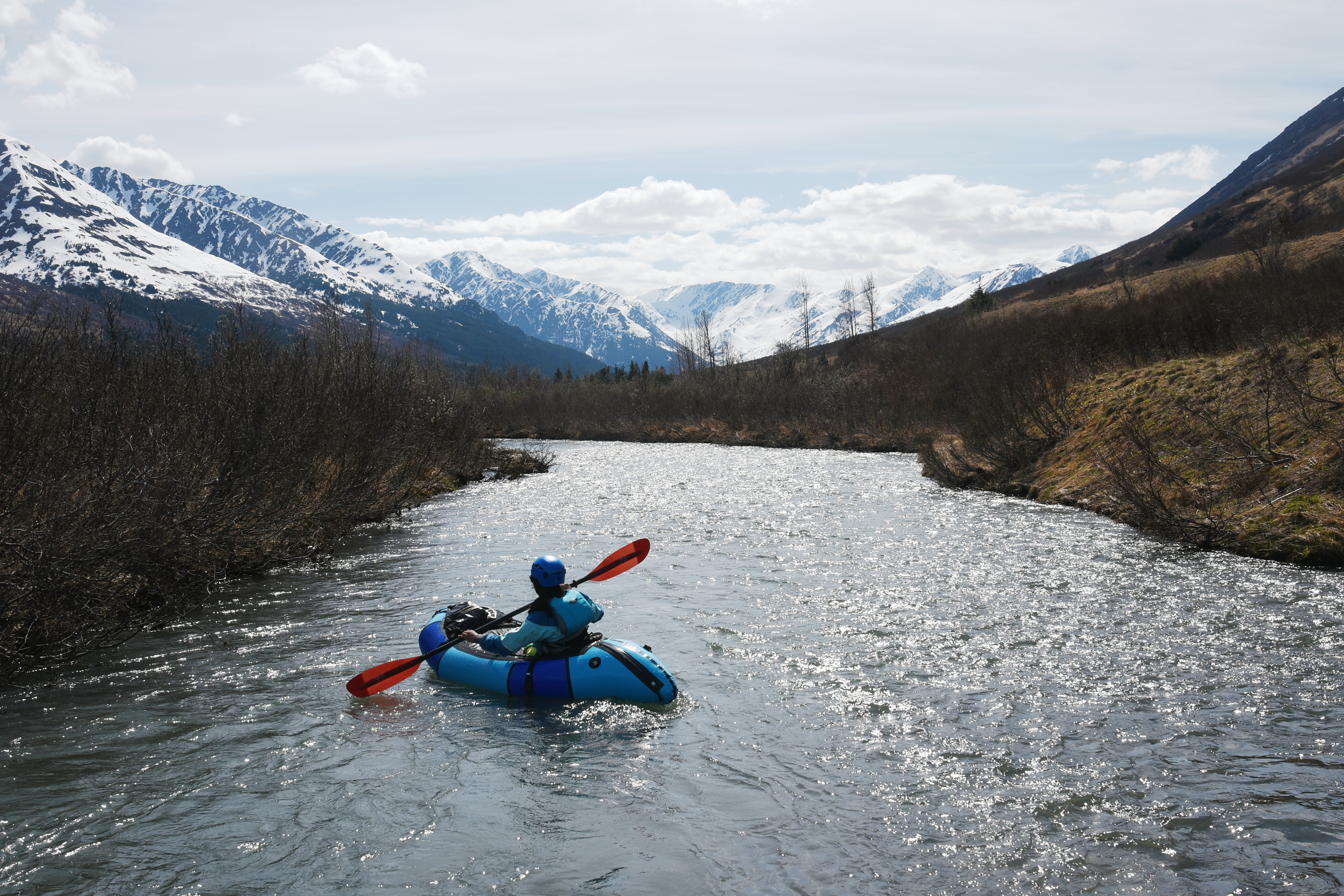
Rafting in Alaska

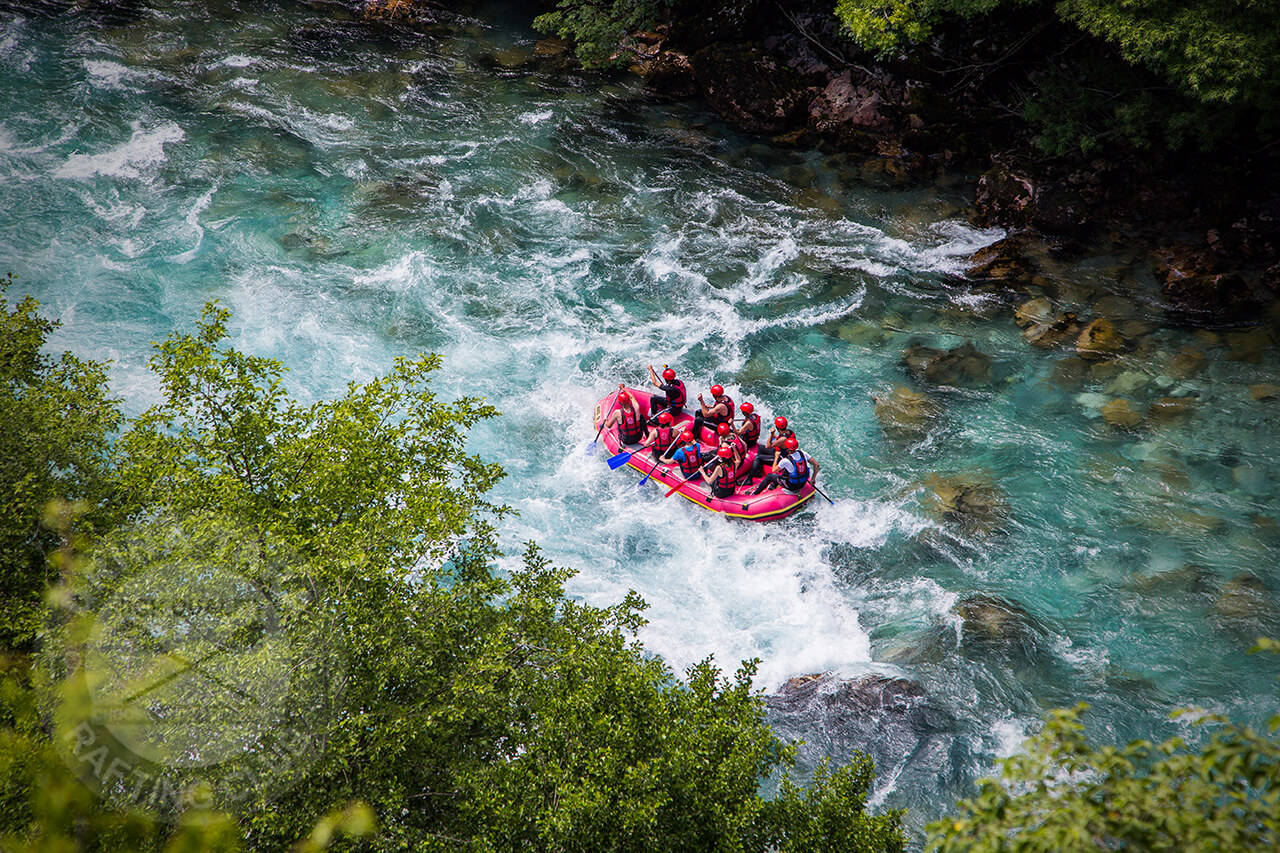
Rafting on the Tara river, Bosnia

Rafting and whitewater rafting are recreational outdoor activities which use an inflatable raft to navigate a river or other body of water. This is often done on whitewater or different degrees of rough water. Dealing with risk is often a part of the experience.

This activity as an adventure sport has become popular since the 1950s, if not earlier, evolving from individuals paddling 3 metres (9.8 ft) to 4.3 metres (14 ft) rafts with double-bladed paddles or oars to multi-person rafts propelled by single-bladed paddles and steered by a person at the stern, or by the use of oars.

Rafting on certain sections of rivers is considered an extreme sport and can be fatal, while other sections are not so extreme or difficult. Rafting is also a competitive sport practiced around the world which culminates in a world rafting championship event between the participating nations. The International Rafting Federation, often referred to as the IRF, is the worldwide body which oversees all aspects of the sport.

== Equipment ==
Rafting equipment has continuously evolved and developed significantly from old rubber WW II era military surplus rafts. Modern whitewater rafts are typically made with advanced nylon or Kevlar infused plastics like PVC or urethane; though many of the more entry-level low-cost manufacturers still use a glued rubber. Plastic is generally more durable, longer-lasting, and just as easy to repair compared to older rubber rafts.

Paddles and oars are the typical means of propulsion for rafts and come in many sizes and varieties with specific river conditions in mind.

=== Paddles ===
Paddles are a combination of layered wood, plastic, aluminium, carbon fiber, or other advanced composites. There are many types and combinations of these materials with lower-end entry-level paddles being composed of cheap aluminum and plastic. Higher-end models are constructed of high-end composites and mostly utilized by professional rafting guides, raft racers, and expedition paddlers.

The basic paddle design for rafting consists of 3 parts:

- Single blade
- Shaft
- T-grip

Paddles are typically utilized by rafters in smaller and lower volume rivers where rocks and other hazards can damage larger oars. Paddles are typically used by guests on commercial trips as well since it is seen as a more engaging way to enjoy the river trip. When paddles are used in a raft it is referred to as "paddling" or "paddle guiding".

=== Oars ===
Oars are commonly made from the same materials as paddles: wood, plastic, aluminum, and carbon fiber. Oars are designed for several different rivers with slightly different blade shapes built to handle varying river conditions. Wooden oars are typically built as one solid piece to help retain strength and resilience of the oar while it is strained under a load. Composite or metallic oars typically are made in three parts:

- Blade
- Shaft
- Grip

All of these parts are interchangeable and can be upgraded and altered in many ways to make rowing more enjoyable. Oars are generally used on wider flatter rivers of higher volume to facilitate moving more efficiently across long slow-moving pools, though anglers will often use shorter oars on smaller rafts in low volume rivers to help them maintain an advantageous upstream position while anglers cast from the raft. When a raft utilizes oars it is called "rowing" though many people typically incorrectly refer to this as "oaring" or "oar framing", however, these terms are incorrect and often suggest inexperience when used in conversation with members of the rafting community. Oars typically use one of 2 systems to attach to the boat, but in either case, they interface with the boat through a large metallic frame strapped to the boat called an "oar frame". Oars connect to the frame by either a pin and clip system or a system called oarlocks. Either system connects to the frame via oar towers on either side of the frame.

==== Pins and clips ====
Pins are referred to as "thole pins" or "oar pins". A large metal clip attaches to the oar and clips onto the pin. The top of the pin has a rubber or plastic stopper that prevents the oar from slipping over the top of the pin. The bottom of the pin connects to an oar tower designed to hold the pin in place. This system is an older system, however, it is useful for certain types of river running; namely big, dangerous Class 5 rivers that require your oars to stay in place as much as possible.

==== Oarlocks ====
Oarlocks or simply "locks" are a more common form of attachment for oars as they allow the rower to "feather" the oar back and forth as they row making it easier on the person using the oars to continue downstream. Oarlocks look like a pin topped with a U-shaped metal flange. The oars slide into the gap between the U-shaped metal pieces and can be held in place with a plastic stopper called an oarlock. The oarlock allows the oar to maintain its position on the oar at a correct length for rowing.

== History ==
Whitewater rafting can be traced back to 1811 when the first recorded attempt to navigate the Snake River in Wyoming was planned. With no training, experience, or proper equipment, the river was found to be too difficult and dangerous. Hence, it was given the nickname "Mad River". On June 9, 1940, Clyde Smith led a successful trip through the Snake River Canyon. In 1843, lieutenant John Fremont introduced the first rubber raft in the US. Later, in 1844, further enhancements were made by Peter Halkett. These vessels greatly facilitated whitewater navigation. It lasted for many years, with improvements in craftsmanship and safety over time.

== Classes of white water ==
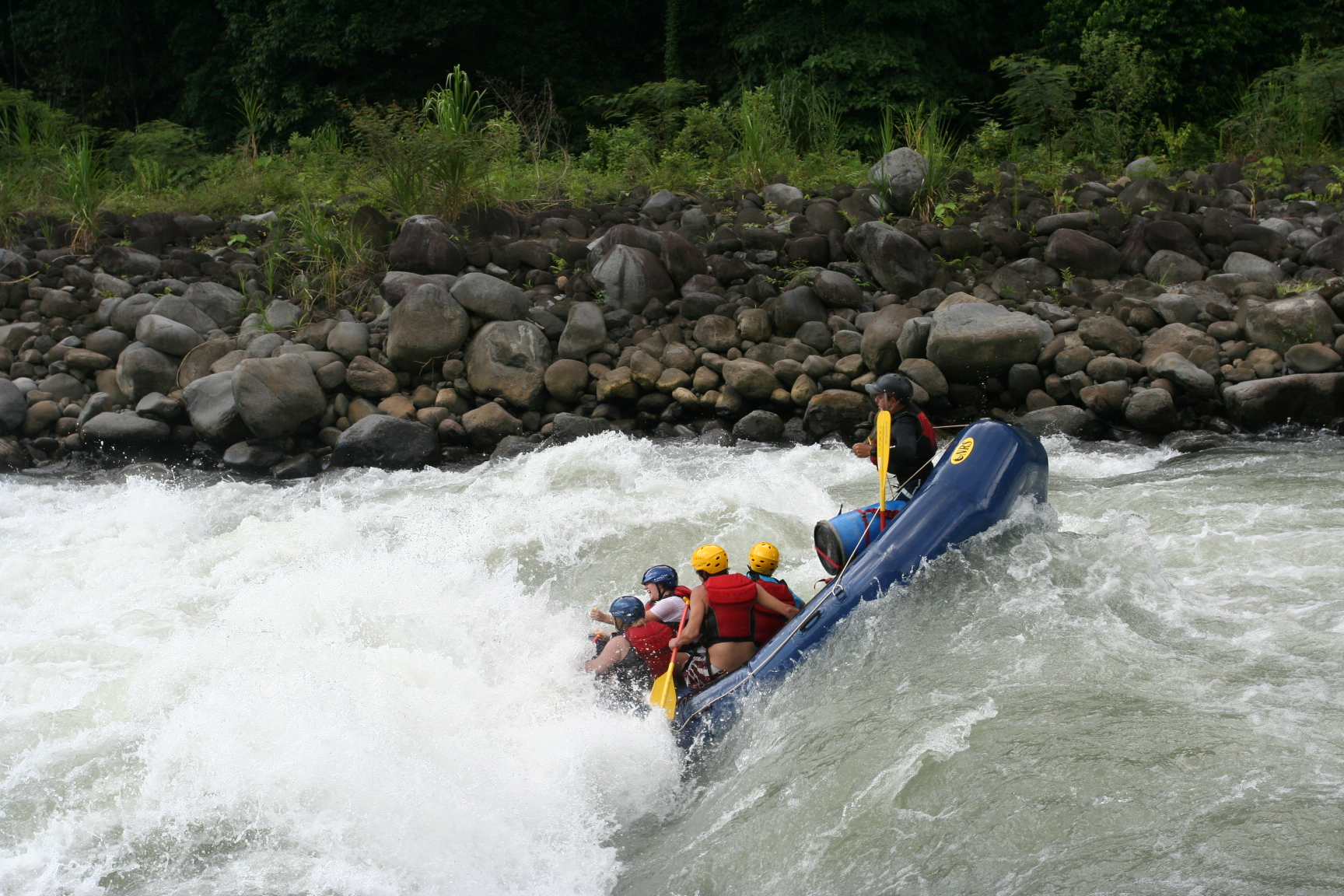
Rafting on the Pacuare River, Costa Rica

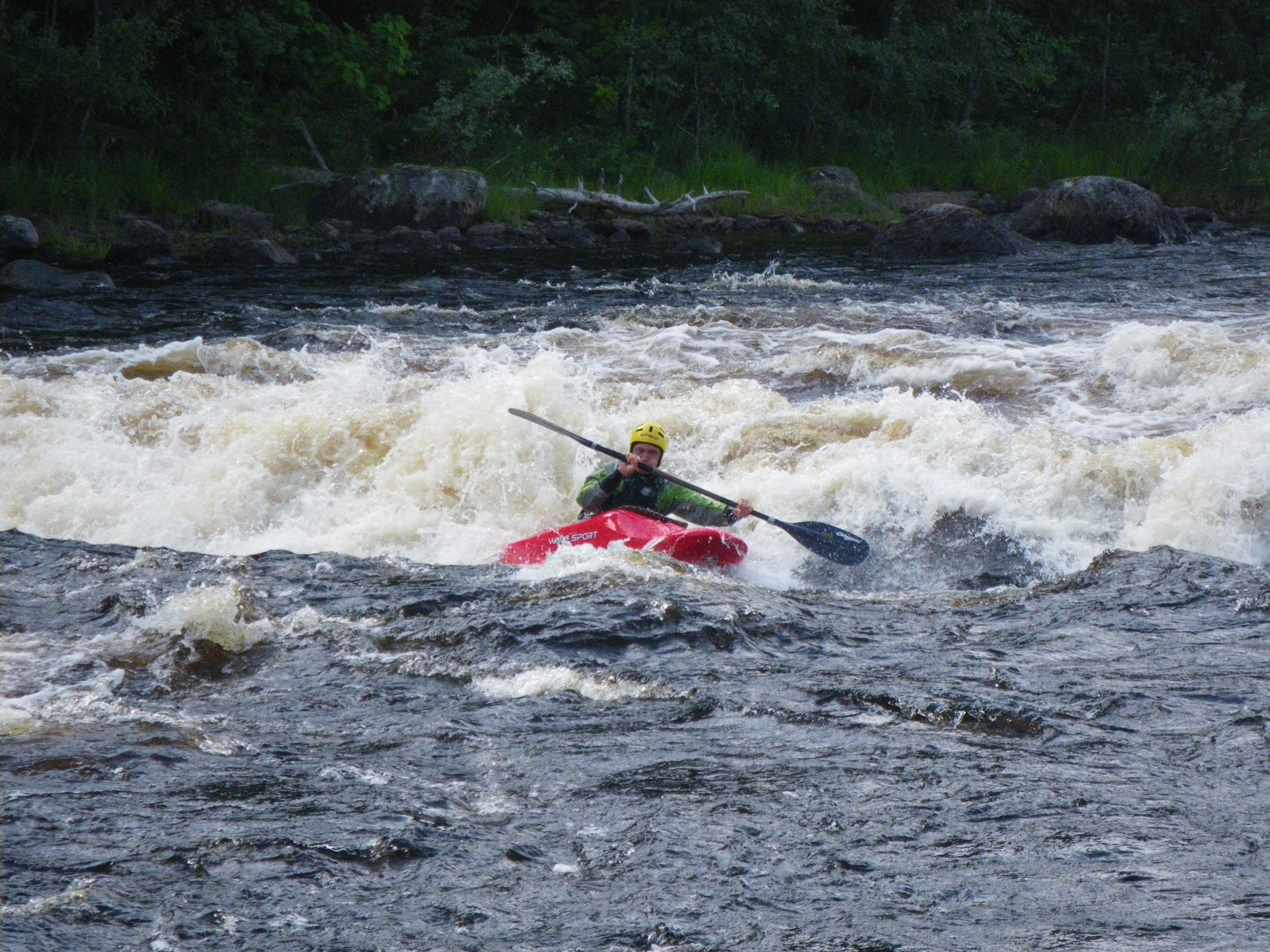
Rafting on the Neitikoski Rapids in Lieksa, North Karelia, Finland

Otherwise known as the International Scale of River Difficulty, below are the six grades of difficulty in white water rafting. They range from simple to very dangerous and potential death or serious injuries.

Class 1: Very small rough areas, might require slight maneuvering. (Skill level: Very basic)

Class 2: Some rough water, maybe some rocks, might require some maneuvering. (Skill level: Basic paddling skill)

Class 3: Small waves, maybe a small drop, but no considerable danger. May require significant maneuvering. (Skill level: Some experience in rafting)

Class 4: Whitewater, medium waves, maybe rocks, maybe a considerable drop, sharp maneuvers may be needed. (Skill level: Exceptional rafting experience)

Class 5: Whitewater, large waves, large volume, possibility of large rocks and hazards, possibility of a large drop, requires precise maneuvering. (Skill level: Full mastery of rafting)

Class 6: Class 6 rapids are considered to be so dangerous that they are effectively unnavigable on a reliably safe basis. Rafters can expect to encounter substantial whitewater, huge waves, huge rocks and hazards, and/or substantial drops that will impart severe impacts beyond the structural capacities and impact ratings of almost all rafting equipment. Traversing a Class 6 rapid has a dramatically increased likelihood of ending in serious injury or death compared to lesser classes. (Skill level: Full mastery of rafting, and even then it may not be safe)

== Safety ==
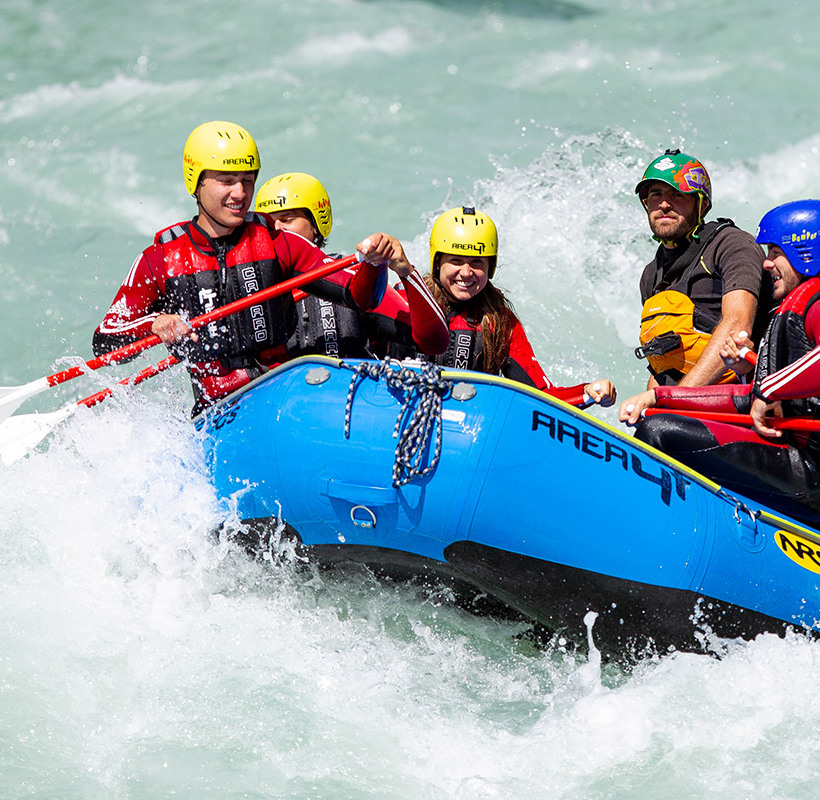
Wetsuits, additional personal flotation devices (aka lifejackets) and sport helmets are mandatory and often imposed by law at least on tours of commercial operators, due to the constant risk of falling off the boat

The overall risk level on a rafting trip using proper precautions is low. Thousands of people safely enjoy rafting trips every year.

Like most outdoor sports, rafting, in general, has become safer over the years. Expertise in the sport has increased, and equipment has become more specialized and improved in quality. As a result, the difficulty rating of most river runs has changed. A classic example is the Colorado River in the Grand Canyon, which historically had a reputation far exceeding its actual safety statistics. Today the Grand Canyon sees hundreds of safe rafting trips by both do it yourself rafters and commercial river concessionaires.

Rafting companies generally require customers to sign waiver forms indicating understanding and acceptance of potential serious risks. Both do-it-yourself and commercial rafting trips often begin with safety presentations to educate rafting participants about problems that may arise. Depending on the area, safety regulations covering rafting, both for the general do-it-yourself public as well as commercial operators, may exist in legislation. These range from the mandatory wearing of lifejackets, carrying certain equipment such as whistles and throwable flotation devices, to certification of commercial outfitters and their employees.

It is generally advisable to discuss safety measures with a commercial rafting operator before signing on for that type of trip. The required equipment needed is essential information to be considered.

Risks in white water rafting stem from both environmental dangers and from improper behavior. Certain features on rivers are inherently unsafe and have remained consistently so. These would include 'keeper hydraulics', 'strainers' (e.g. fallen trees), dams (especially low-head dams, which tend to produce river-wide keeper hydraulics), undercut rocks, and of course high waterfalls.

Typical rafting injuries include trauma from striking an object, traumatic stress from the interaction of the paddler's positioning and equipment and the force of the water, overuse injuries, submersion/environmental injuries, and non-environmental injuries due to undisclosed medical conditions (such as heart problems). Studies have shown that injury rates in rafting are relatively low, though they may be skewed due to a large number of unreported incidents. Fatalities are rare in both commercial and do-it-yourself rafting. Meta-analyses have calculated that fatalities ranged between 0.55 – 0.86 per 100,000 user days. A rare accident with five fatalities occurred in 1987 on the Chilko River in British Columbia, Canada.

== Environmental issues ==
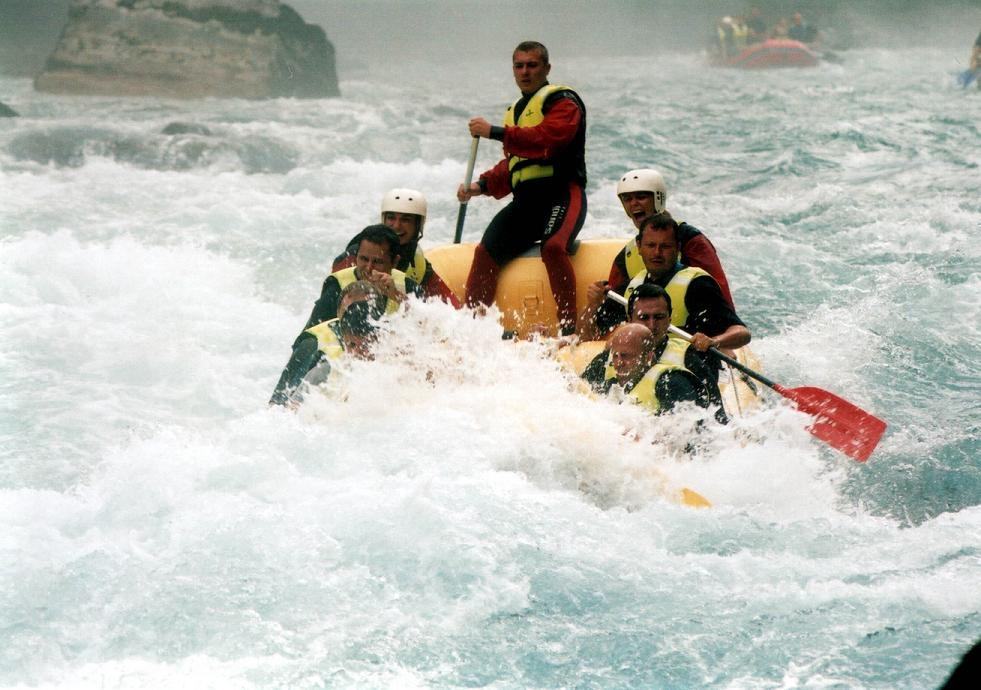
Rafting in Montenegro

Like all outdoor activities, rafting must balance its use of nature with the conservation of rivers as a natural resource and habitat. Because of these issues, some rivers now have regulations restricting the annual seasons and daily operating times or numbers of rafters.

Conflicts have arisen when commercial rafting operators, often in co-operation with municipalities and tourism associations, alter the riverbed by dredging and/or blasting in order to eliminate safety hazards or create more interesting whitewater features in the river. Environmentalists argue that this may have negative impacts to riparian and aquatic ecosystems, while proponents claim these measures are usually only temporary since a riverbed is naturally subject to permanent changes during large floods and other events. Another conflict involves the distribution of scarce river permits to either the do-it-yourself public or commercial rafting companies.

Rafting by do-it-yourself rafters and commercial rafting companies contributes to the economy of many regions which in turn may contribute to the protection of rivers from hydroelectric power generation, diversion for irrigation, and other development. Additionally, white water rafting trips can promote environmentalism. Multi-day rafting trips by do-it-yourself rafters and commercial rafting companies through the National Wild and Scenic Rivers System have the potential to develop environmental stewardship and general environmental behavior. Studies suggest that environmental efficacy increases when there is an increase in the length of the trip, daily immersion, and the amount of resource education by trip participants.

== See also ==
- Packraft
- Liloing
- Paddling
- Raft Guide
- Swiftwater rescue
- Tubing
- Whitewater canoeing
- River rapids ride
