= Chip Rawlins =

American writer

Chip Rawlins (born 1949) is an American writer and the co-author of The Complete Walker IV with Colin Fletcher. He also publishes under the name C. L. Rawlins . Rawlins is a non-fiction writer, poet, outdoor guide, and instructor. Previous jobs include: firefighter, science editor, and field hydrologist.

== Biography ==
Rawlins was born in 1949, in Laramie, Wyoming. He went to Utah State University and was a Wallace Stegner Fellow at Stanford University. He lives in Laramie, where he has served as president of the Wyoming Outdoor Council and on the Greater Yellowstone Coalition. He has also lived in New Zealand .

== Books ==
- A Ceremony on Bare Ground (1985)
- Sky's Witness: A year in the Wind River Range (Henry Holt, 1993)
- Broken Country: Mountains and Memory (Henry Holt, 1996)
- In Gravity National Park (University of Nevada, 1998)
- The Complete Walker IV (Alfred A. Knopf, 2002)

== Awards ==
- USFS National Primitive Skills Award
- 1999 Poetry Prize from the Mountain and Plains Booksellers Association
- Stegner Fellowship
