= The Man Who Walked Through Time =

Book by Colin Fletcher

- Author: Colin Fletcher
- Language: English
- Subject: Backpacking
- Genre: Non-fiction
- Publication date: 1968
- Publication place: United States

The Man Who Walked Through Time (1968) is Colin Fletcher's chronicle of the first person to walk a continuous route through Grand Canyon National Park. The book is credited with "introducing an increasingly nature-hungry public to the spiritual and physical rewards of backpacking".

When Fletcher conducted the trip in 1963, the park did not encompass the entire length of the canyon; it was later expanded so it did. Fletcher thus only walked about half of the physical canyon, though he was correct in saying he was the first to walk the section of the canyon designated as a national park. Kenton Grua, a professional river guide, was the first person in recorded history to walk the entire length of the Grand Canyon, in 1977. He was inspired by Fletcher's book but set out to "do it right" by walking the canyon from end to end, not just the section inside the park.
