= Kilbella River =

Coordinates: 51°43′09″N 127°20′52″W

The Kilbella River (Gə̀ldala in Oowekyala, meaning "Long River") is a river in the Central Coast region of British Columbia, Canada, flowing into Kilbella Bay, which is an arm of Rivers Inlet.

The Chuckwalla River also flows into Kilbella Bay via the same valley. The Kilbella River is considered to be a stream and is nearby Kiltala Indian Reserve 2.

== See also ==
- List of rivers of British Columbia
