= Chuckwalla River =

The Chuckwalla River (C̓àgvala in Oowekyala, meaning "Short River" ) is a river in the Central Coast region of British Columbia, Canada, flowing into Kilbella Bay, which is a side water of Rivers Inlet. The river's headwaters are at 51°52′N 127°54′W.

The Kilbella River also flows into Kilbella Bay.

== See also ==
- Chuckwalla (disambiguation)
