= The Thousand-Mile Summer =

1964 book by Colin Fletcher

- Author: Colin Fletcher
- Original title: The Thousand-Mile Summer: in desert and high sierra
- Language: English
- Subject: Backpacking
- Genre: Non-fiction
- Publisher: Howell-North Books
- Publication date: 1964
- Publication place: United States

The Thousand-Mile Summer by Colin Fletcher is the author's chronicle of his 1958 hike along the entire eastern edge of California. Fletcher writes of traveling on foot along the Colorado River, though Death Valley and the High Sierra. The book was first published in 1964 by Howell-North Books.
