= McAllister Point =

Point in British Columbia, Canada

Coordinates: 51°39′34″N 127°25′29″W

McAllister Point is a point in the Central Coast region of British Columbia, Canada, on the east shore of the meeting of Moses and Rivers Inlets.
