= Raft guide =

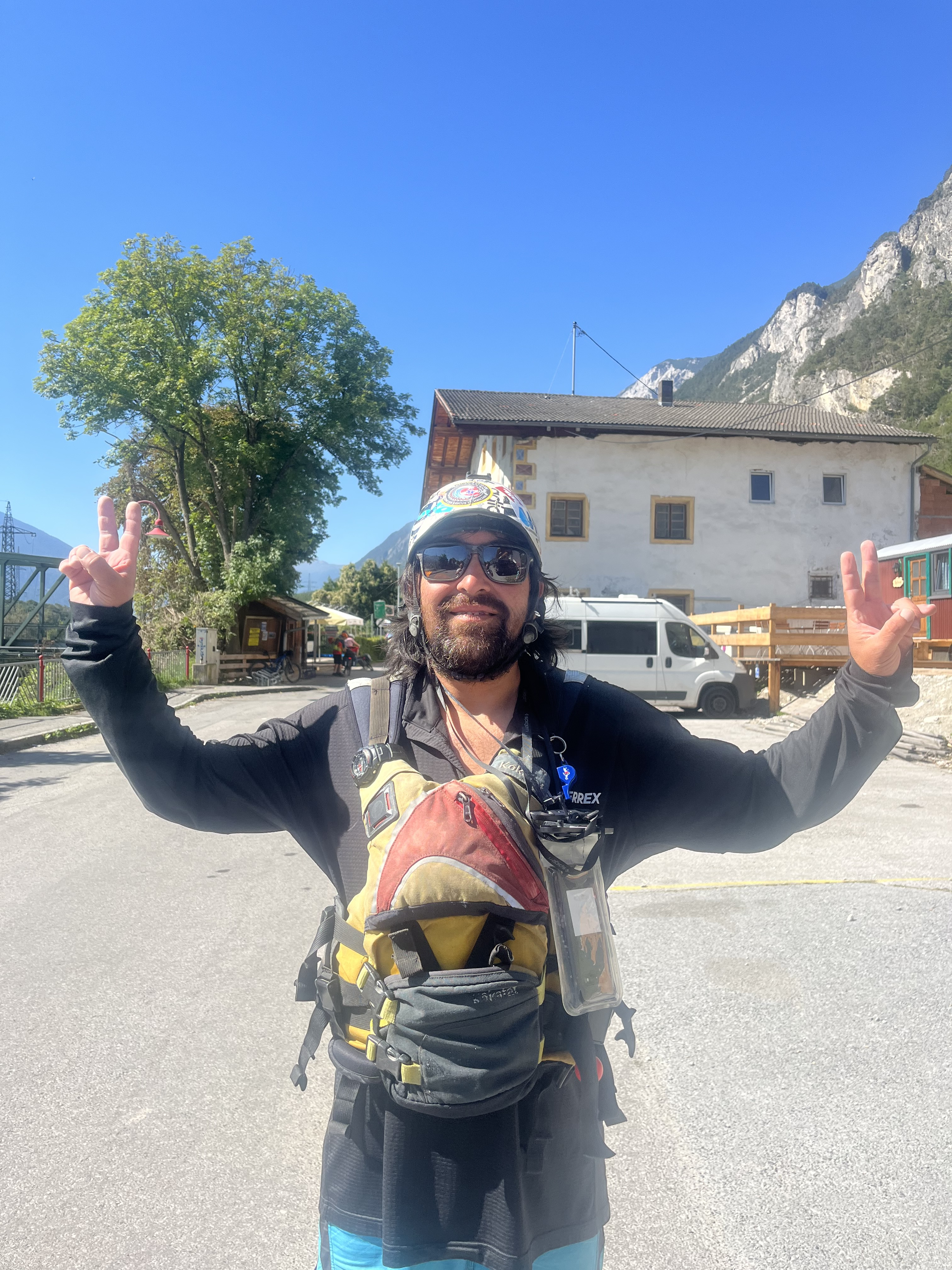
A typical Raftguide

A raft guide is a trained professional capable of leading commercial whitewater rafting trips. Most raft guides are employed by commercial outfitters who run either single or multi-day trips.

== Training ==
Typically, first year raft guides are required to undergo a training program often run by the company or a professional guide training school, before beginning to guide commercial trips. This training utilizes classroom and on-river experience to train students in rigging and maneuvering vessels; river flow and hazards; scouting and running rapids; and river rescue and emergency procedures. Trainees are generally required to have a minimum of basic first aid and CPR certifications. Professional river guides often have additional advanced certifications such as International Rafting Federation-GTE, Wilderness First Aid, Wilderness First Responder, Swift Water Rescue, White Water Rescue or Emergency Medical Technician.

== Description ==
The majority of raft guides are seasonal employees and work during the spring and summer months when rivers are flowing at their best levels. However, during the seasonal winter months some raft guides will continue to work by traveling to countries with warmer climates where commercial rafting exists.

A raft guide's primary job is to navigate an inflatable raft with passengers down a river in a safe and enjoyable manner. This requires that they continually assess and manage risks during the trip. A skilled raft guide is able to recognize river features and understand their effects on a raft, and what is required to navigate among or around these features with passengers. On rapids where the potential risk of injury is high, it is the guides' responsibility to keep the raft from overturning and the passengers from falling overboard.

=== Types of guiding ===
Oar Guiding is where the guide maneuvers the raft with oars from either the stern or middle of the raft. On multi-day trips, it is common to have a center oar rig where clients do not paddle, and where gear is stored. Guides will use techniques such as 'walking the oars' through flat sections or 'holding a star' when stern rigged through large waves. Oar Guides generally have more control over their raft than paddle guides, but oar rigged rafts are dangerous when flipping and hard to re-right, making them less versatile in big water rafting. Oar boats are often rigged to carry all of the gear for a trip. Oars are typically made of wood, but sometimes of plastic.

Paddle Guiding is the most common type of high adventure guiding where the guide sits in the stern of the boat with a one bladed guide stick (paddle). Using draws, the guide can influence the direction of the boat, along with using different paddling commands for their crew. Guests often enjoy paddle guiding the most as they feel like they have control over what is going on in the boat.

Bow Guiding is where two guides are in the boat: one in the stern and one in the bow. This can be done in a stern rigged boat, or a raft where both guides are paddle guiding. Bow guiding is usually only done over short stretches of whitewater that require a lot of maneuvering for safe passage. Bow guides use techniques such as 'spearing' through large waves, and bow draws to quickly change the direction of the boat. Unlike stern guides, the bow guide will never pry with their paddle; instead they will change the orientation of their hands to maintain a power grip in both directions.

== Compensation ==
Guide compensation can vary a great deal by type and length of the trip. In North America, guides are typically paid by the day and may receive gratuities from their clients.
