= Kabloona =

1941 travel literature

Inside cover art of 1941 edition. Art by Gontran De Poncins.

Kabloona is a book by French adventurer Gontran de Poncins, written in collaboration with Lewis Galantiere. It was first published in the United States in 1941 as a selection of the Book-of-the-Month Club (via Time-Life Books), in England in 1942, and in French (as a translation of the English version) in 1947. The book contains many drawings by the author and 32 pages of black-and-white photographs in the first edition. In the United States, where it was most popular, it is considered a classic of travel literature.

== Description ==
Kabloona recounts Poncin's solo unsupported journey in the Canadian Arctic near King William Island, Canada, where he lived with the Inuit (in those days, still generally called the Eskimos) for about 15 months during the period 1938 to late 1939. Poncins was a French aristocratic count in his late thirties. Bored with the business world, Poncins became a freelance journalist so that he could travel, selling accounts of his experiences to newspapers and magazines.

Curiosity drew him to exotic areas throughout the world – Tahiti, New Caledonia, and, eventually (in 1938), the Canadian Arctic. What he discovered there, he believed, was a nobler way of life and, perhaps, a means of saving a fallen Western world. Initially, the lure of the Arctic for Poncins stemmed from a general disillusionment with civilization. [The trip resulted in] his popular Arctic travel narrative, Kabloona.... Although Poncins was French, the text was first published in the United States in English in 1941; the French edition followed six years later. In many ways, the book was primarily an American phenomenon. Upon his return from the Arctic, Poncins submitted well over a thousand pages of notes in French and English to an editor at Time-Life Books. The editor shaped the text into its published form, and Time-Life successfully marketed it to large American audiences. The French edition of Kabloona is a translation of the English Time-Life edition.

In Kabloona, Poncins explores Inuit culture and the Inuit world view, leaving the reader with a deeper understanding of such things as wife-swapping, living in an igloo at −40 °C (−40 °F), why and how Inuit have feasts lasting 20 hours at a stretch, their concepts of time and family life, their perspectives on Europeans and European food and gear, the Inuit diet, hunting techniques, wildlife, nomadic life, dogs, weather, clothing, communal sharing of goods, and notions of private property.

Poncins was not a scientist and did not study the Inuit from a scientific perspective. Rather, he provides his own stylized personal points of view and descriptions of Inuit life. In the book, he is initially disparaging of the Inuit way of life, seeing it as primitive and often using the description "cave man". Indeed, a clear theme of racial superiority, described in terms of innate intelligence and physical appearances, and cultural superiority in terms of morals and ethics pervades the first part of his work. As the book progresses and his hardships in the harsh Arctic environment take their toll (at one point Poncins runs 1,400 mi (2,300 km) behind a dog sled), he begins to find a new appreciation for the Inuit way of life, for their intelligence and resourcefulness, and experiences a spiritual awakening, ultimately reaching a point where he discovers that he himself has become so well adapted to the Inuit way of life that he is no longer a "kabloona" and has become one of them.

== The term "kabloona" ==
The title Kabloona is a transcription of the Inuktitut word nowadays spelled qallunaaq (qablunaaq in Inuinnaqtun). It is a term originally used to describe white Europeans – a reference to their qalluit, the bushy eyebrows that the Inuit saw as the distinctive feature of Europeans. Nowadays, its use is a bit vaguer. It can mean Anglo-Canadian in contrast to other ethnolinguistic groups like the uiviimiut - French Canadians. Alternately, it is used to describe non-Inuit Canadian society, or even occidental society as a whole. In the 1940s, however, Inuit made fewer of those distinctions, and the term could easily apply to Poncins despite his French ethnicity.

== In popular culture ==
In the 1941 film Never Give A Sucker An Even Break, waitress Jody Gilbert calls W.C. Fields a "big kabloona". Fields replies: "Kabloona – I haven't been called that for two days."

The Firesign Theater recording "In The Next World You're On Your Own", Side 2 is labeled "We've Lost Our Big Kabloona".

== Editions ==
- Gontran De Poncins (author), Lewis Galantiere (collaborator). Kabloona. 1941. ISBN 1-55597-249-7
- Gontran De Poncins (author), Eric Linklater (intro). Kabloona. London, 1942. Full-text online. Scanned book via Internet Archive.
