= The Complete Walker =

Backpacking book by Colin Fletcher

The Complete Walker (I - IV)
- First edition
- Author: Colin Fletcher
- Original title: The Complete Walker
- Language: English
- Subject: Backpacking
- Genre: Non-fiction
- Publisher: Knopf
- Publication date: 1968
- Publication place: United States
- ISBN: 978-0-375-70323-2

The Complete Walker is an in-depth guide to backpacking, written by Colin Fletcher with illustrations by political aide/women's rights advocate Nick Bauer. It was very influential and "could be credited with starting the backpacking industry." Since its first publishing in 1968, there have been three revised editions. The most recent edition, The Complete Walker IV, was co-authored by Chip Rawlins, with illustrations by Vanna Prince and Hannah Hinchman.

== Editions ==
- Fletcher, Colin (1968). The Complete Walker. Knopf, New York City, NY, USA.
- Fletcher, Colin (1974). The New Complete Walker. Knopf, New York City, NY, USA. ISBN 0-394-48099-6.
- Fletcher, Colin (1984). The Complete Walker III. Knopf, New York City, NY, USA. ISBN 0-394-51962-0 and 0-394-72264-7
- Fletcher, Colin (2002). The Complete Walker IV. Knopf, New York City, NY, USA. ISBN 0-375-70323-3.
