= Chuckawalla Bill =

Chuckawalla Bill (August 2, 1875 – January 11, 1950) was a Spanish–American War veteran, a sapper in the British Army during World War I, a prospector, a cook, and vagabond. His birth name was William Anthony Simon, although he most frequently used the name Anthony W. Simmons. Later in life, he settled down in Palo Verde, California. He is buried in the Los Angeles National Cemetery, Los Angeles, California.

In 1968, Colin Fletcher came across a cave near the Colorado River (about 5 miles southeast of Boulder City, Nevada) in which Bill had been living in and abandoned around 1916. The Man from the Cave was a 1981 book written by Fletcher, which detailed how, after finding a trunk and belongings abandoned by someone, Fletcher spent years putting together the life story of "Trunkman."

Colin Fletcher's quote about Chuckawalla Bill:

We both valued solitude and silence and square, smoothed-off granite boulders.

The "Chuckawalla Bill Spring" north of Desert Hot Springs 34.0272671°N 116.4564434°W is named after him.
