= Colin Fletcher =

American backpackerand writer (1922–2007)

Colin Fletcher (photograph, John Sexton/Appalachian Long Distance Hikers Association)

Colin Fletcher (14 March 1922 – 12 June 2007) was a pioneering backpacker and writer.

In 1963, Fletcher walked the length of that portion of Grand Canyon contained within the 1963 boundaries of Grand Canyon National Park. Although his route spans only a little more than one-third the length of Grand Canyon, Fletcher was only the second person to complete this section and the first to accomplish the feat "in one go", as chronicled in his bestselling 1968 memoir The Man Who Walked Through Time. Fletcher obtained the route information critical for successfully completing his epic trip from the godfather of Grand Canyon hiking, Harvey Butchart, who completed the distance barely ahead of Fletcher the same year, having hiked it one section at a time over 17 years. Through his influential hiker's guide, The Complete Walker, published the same year, he became a kind of "spiritual godfather" of the wilderness backpacking movement. Through successive editions, this book became the definitive work on the topic and was dubbed "the Hiker's Bible" by Field & Stream magazine.

== Biography ==
=== Early life and career ===
Born in Cardiff, Wales, on 14 March 1922, Fletcher was educated in England and served six years in the Royal Marine Commandos during World War II. He married Sonia Mary Ash in 1945 and they lived in St. Ives, Cornwall, for a year where he was an instructor at the Mountain Warfare Training Centre. They moved to Kenya in 1947 where they ran the Kitale Hotel. They separated in 1948 and he spent time farming in Kenya, surveying in Zimbabwe, and as a prospector in western Canada. He moved to the United States in 1956. Two years later, he walked the length of the state of California, a journey that was the basis for his first book, The Thousand-Mile Summer.

=== Writing career ===
Fletcher published a total of 10 books between 1964 and 2001, which included four editions of The Complete Walker. His first book, The Thousand-Mile Summer (1964) recounted his 1958 hike along the entire eastern edge of California. His second book was The Man Who Walked Through Time (1968), in which Fletcher was the first person to walk a continuous route through Grand Canyon National Park. The book covered such topics as technique, the journey itself, and reflections which included the concept, after weeks of walking, of achieving a state of mentally "merging" with the place that one is visiting. When Fletcher conducted the trip in 1963, the National Park did not encompass the entire length of the canyon, the park was later expanded to include the entire Canyon. The first person to walk the entire length of the Grand Canyon was Kenton Grua in 1977. He was inspired by Fletcher's book but set out to "do it right" by walking from end to end, not just the section of the canyon inside the National Park.

In 1968, Fletcher published the first edition of The Complete Walker, his most popular work, including three new editions, with the last in 2001, in total selling over 500,000 copies. Fletcher's book is distinguished by its encyclopedic treatment of the technique and equipment of wilderness travel, as well as by what critics and readers have praised as its rousing humor and elegant, vigorous prose. While certainly comprehensive in its discussion of all aspects of wilderness travel, it also devotes a generous amount of coverage to Fletcher's self-confessed idiosyncrasies, ranging from his affection for walking staffs and corduroy shorts to his loathing of wilderness trail guidebooks.

In the early 1970s, Fletcher returned to Kenya's Serengeti Plain, and Great Rift Valley for a year, an experience he recounted in The Winds of Mara, published in 1973.

In 1981, he published The Man From the Cave, which relates how, after finding a trunk and a few belongings abandoned by someone in a desert cave in Nevada, he spent years piecing together the life story of "Trunkman." As he pieced together the mystery of the man's life, Fletcher saw in it a discovery and reflection of himself, "We both valued solitude and silence and square, smoothed-off granite boulders."

In 1989, Fletcher rafted and hiked the entire length of the Green/Colorado River from its source in the Wind River Range of Wyoming to the Gulf of California. He related the story of the journey in River: One Man's Journey Down the Colorado. Source to Sea. (1997), using his customary description of the places through which he travelled as a metaphor, comparing the course of the river and its emptying into the sea, to life itself, and his own life in particular.

His last edition of The Complete Walker, The Complete Walker IV (2002), was written with Chip Rawlins.

=== Later years ===
In his later years, Fletcher became a prolific writer on environmental issues. He was publicity-shy, rarely responding to letters or interview requests, although always willing to incorporate reader feedback into revised editions of The Complete Walker.

In 2001, at the age of 79, Fletcher was struck and seriously injured by a sport utility vehicle while walking to a town meeting near his home in Monterey County, California. His survival was attributed to his excellent physical condition. Within a year of the accident, he was back on his feet and walking daily.

According to published obituaries, Fletcher died on 12 June 2007, age 85, in Monterey, California, as a result of complications from a head injury sustained from being hit by the car six years earlier.

== Influence and legacy ==
Annette McGivney, editor of Backpacker, has written that "Colin was sort of the founding father of modern backpacking, the first person to write about going out for an extended period and being self-sufficient." Because many people started following Fletcher's advice in The Complete Walker, according to McGivney, "the book could be credited with starting the backpacking industry," including equipment makers and periodicals like Backpacker. Through his writings Fletcher "inspired a generation of young Americans to take up backpacking as means of filling a spiritual void," and to escape from the confusion of Vietnam-era America:

"After Vietnam, I was trying to figure out what to do with my life. So many of my friends had died from bullet holes," recalls Backpacker contributing editor Buck Tilton. "I read The Man Who Walked Through Time, and it was the only thing that made sense to me. Fletcher's words gave meaning to backpacking. I loaded my pack exactly the way Fletcher did and carried a walking stick like his. He was my hero."

== Quotes ==
- God is light, we are told, and Hell is outer darkness. But look at a desert mountain stripped bare by the sun, and you learn only geography. Watch darkness claim it, and for a moment you may grasp why God had to create Satan — or man to create both. — The Thousand-Mile Summer (1964)
- Dedicated urbanites "know" beyond shadow of doubt — because doubt never raises its disturbing head — that civilization is the real world: You only "escape" to wilderness. When you're out and away and immersed, you "know" the obverse: The wilderness world is real, the human world a superimposed facade ... The controversy is, of course, spurious. Neither view can stand alone. Both worlds are real. But the wilderness world is certainly older and will almost certainly last longer. Besides, the second view seems far healthier for a human to embrace. — River (1997)
- But if you judge safety to be the paramount consideration in life you should never, under any circumstances, go on long hikes alone. Don't take short hikes alone, either — or, for that matter, go anywhere alone. And avoid at all costs such foolhardy activities as driving, falling in love, or inhaling air that is almost certainly riddled with deadly germs. Wear wool next to the skin. Insure every good and chattel you possess against every conceivable contingency the future might bring, even if the premiums half-cripple the present. Never cross an intersection against a red light, even when you can see all roads are clear for miles. And never, of course, explore the guts of an idea that seems as if it might threaten one of your more cherished beliefs. In your wisdom you will probably live to be a ripe old age. But you may discover, just before you die, that you have been dead for a long, long time. — The Complete Walker

== Bibliography ==
- The Thousand-Mile Summer (1964) ISBN 0-394-74631-7 and ISBN 0-8310-7154-0
- The Man Who Walked Through Time (1968) ISBN 0-394-71852-6 and ISBN 0-679-72306-4
- The Complete Walker (1968) ISBN 978-0-375-70323-2
  - The New Complete Walker (1974) ISBN 0-394-48099-6
  - The Complete Walker III (1984) ISBN 0-394-51962-0 and ISBN 0-394-72264-7
  - The Complete Walker IV (2002) ISBN 0-375-70323-3
- The Winds of Mara (1973) ISBN 0-394-47091-5
- The Man from the Cave (1981) ISBN 0-394-71157-2 and ISBN 0-394-40695-8 [see article on Chuckawalla Bill]
- The Secret Worlds of Colin Fletcher (1989) ISBN 0-679-72554-7 and ISBN 0-394-56283-6
- River: One Man's Journey Down the Colorado, Source to Sea (1997) ISBN 0-394-57421-4
- Autobiography (incomplete and unpublished – started in 2001 just before the accident)
