= Princess Royal (1778 sloop) =

History

Great Britain
- Name: Princess Royal
- Launched: 1778
- Captured: By Spanish Navy, 1789

Spain
- Name: Princesa Real
- Acquired: 1789
- Fate: Damaged by a typhoon at Macau, 1791. Sold for salvage.

General characteristics
- Tons burthen: 65 (bm)
- Length: 43 ft (13 m)
- Beam: 16 ft (4.9 m)
- Sail plan: Sloop
- Complement: 15 crew
- Armament: 4 x 1 pound (0.5 kg) cannon + 8 swivel guns

Princess Royal was a British merchant ship that sailed on fur trading ventures in the late 1780s, and was captured at Nootka Sound by Esteban José Martínez of Spain during the Nootka Crisis of 1789. Called Princesa Real while under the Spanish Navy, the vessel was one of the important issues of negotiation during the first Nootka Convention and the difficulties in carrying out the agreements. The vessel also played an important role in both British and Spanish exploration of the Pacific Northwest and the Hawaiian Islands. In 1790, while under Spanish control, Princesa Real carried out the first detailed examination of the Strait of Juan de Fuca by non-indigenous peoples, finding, among other places, the San Juan Islands, Haro Strait (the entrance to the Strait of Georgia), Esquimalt Harbour near present-day Victoria, British Columbia, and Admiralty Inlet (the entrance to Puget Sound).

== British merchant vessel Princess Royal ==
Lloyd's Register listed Princess Royal in 1789 as being a sloop of 60 tons (bm), surveyed in Leith, Scotland in 1778 and resurveyed in 1786; Class A1, Copper sheathed, single deck with beams; draft of 8 feet (2.4 m) when laden; owned by Etches & Co.

From 1786 to 1788 Princess Royal, under Charles Duncan, accompanied the much larger Prince of Wales, under James Colnett, on an expedition to acquire sea otter furs in the Pacific Northwest and sell them in China. The ships were owned by Richard Cadman Etches and Company, also known as King George's Sound Company. The company was exploring the possibilities of taking furs collected in the Pacific Northwest to China, a venture shown to be potentially profitable by James Cook.

The two ships left England on 23 September 1786, rounded Cape Horn, and reached the Pacific Northwest late in the summer of 1787. After trading for furs with the indigenous peoples in the vicinity of Haida Gwaii, Aristazabal Island, and Banks Island, both ships sailed to the Hawaiian Islands where they spent the winter. While on the coast of present-day British Columbia they had a series of first contact encounters with some of the Kitkatla Tsimshian. In Hawaii Princess Royal and Prince of Wales were involved in several violent conflicts with the islanders; one conflict at Waimea Bay, resulted in the death of between five and fourteen Hawaiians.

During the summer of 1788 the two returned to the Pacific Northwest to acquire more furs, this time operating separately. Charles Duncan sailed Princess Royal first to Nootka Sound, then to Haida Gwaii. He then took the ship across Hecate Strait to conduct fur trading among the islands and inlets north of Princess Royal Island, passing through Principe Channel and into Douglas Channel. Although today the name "Princess Royal" applies to a single island, Duncan called the entire archipelago the Princess Royal's Islands. It included what is today called Banks Island, Pitt Island, Gil Island, Campania Island, Gribbell Island, Hawkesbury Island, and the Estevan Group, among others. In late June, 1788, Duncan returned to Haida Gwaii, then proceeded south. He took Princess Royal into the uncharted waters of Milbanke Sound and spent a few days trading with the Heiltsuk. Near Nootka Sound he encountered John Meares, from whom he learned that Colnett and Prince of Wales had not arrived at Nootka. Therefore, Duncan did not stop at Nootka Sound but instead took Princess Royal south, trading in the vicinity of Clayoquot Sound and near the entrance of the Strait of Juan de Fuca. On 17 August 1788, Duncan left the Northwest, sailing Princess Royal back to the Hawaiian Islands, where Prince of Wales and Princess Royal were reunited. The two then sailed to China, arriving in late November, 1788. There they sold the fur skins acquired in the Pacific Northwest. Prince of Wales returned to England via the Cape of Good Hope while Princess Royal remained in the Pacific for another fur trading season. James Colnett also remained, and was given command of Argonaut for another year of fur trading in the Pacific. Thomas Hudson was given command of Princess Royal.

While Duncan and Colnett were not the first Europeans to meet the Haida, their 1787 and 1788 accounts provide the first significant written description of them. There were three main encounters, including two at Rose Harbour in Houston Stewart Channel and one at Juan Perez Sound. The British described "Coyah" (Xō'ya, head of the Qai'dju qē'gawa-i Raven lineage) as the principal chief of Houston Stewart Channel and the adjacent waters. In July 1788 both British ships witnessed and became involved in a conflict between two groups of Haida at Juan Perez Sound — a group from the south led by Xō'ya and "Yuka", and a group from the north called "Sangaskilah" by the British.

== Nootka incident ==
In the spring of 1789 Princess Royal, under Thomas Hudson, along with Iphigenia (William Douglas), Argonaut (James Colnett), and North West America (Robert Funter), all British fur trading vessels, arrived at Nootka Sound. Two American fur trading ships were already anchored in the sound, one of which was Columbia Rediviva, and more arrived later, including Lady Washington, under Robert Gray. Esteban José Martínez, in command of the new Spanish post at Nootka, asserted Spanish sovereignty. After a complicated series of events, Martínez ended up with three captured ships and their crews, Princess Royal among them. Hudson had taken Princess Royal into Nootka Sound earlier and had been allowed to leave on the condition he proceed to China. Instead, he collected more furs from the region and returned to Nootka Sound, expecting Martínez would no longer be there. Hudson did not intend to enter the sound but Princess Royal was becalmed on an incoming tide. A Spanish longboat captured the ship and towed it in. During the capture of Princess Royal the Nuu-chah-nulth ("Nootka") Chief Callicum, the son of Chief Maquinna, was shot and killed.

On 21 June 1789, Martínez dispatched José María Narváez in the captured North West America, renamed Santa Gertrudis la Magna, to explore inlets to the south of Nootka Sound. By early July Narváez returned to Nootka, having sailed about 65 miles (105 km) into the Strait of Juan de Fuca, demonstrating that it was a very large inlet. After hearing Narváez's report, Martínez felt that the Strait of Juan de Fuca was the entrance of the legendary Northwest Passage and of extreme strategic importance. Therefore, he placed Gonzalo López de Haro and Narváez in command of San Carlos (el Filipino) and the captured Princess Royal, renamed Princesa Real, and sent them to the Spanish naval base at San Blas with news about the strait. In October, Martínez completely evacuated Nootka Sound and returned to San Blas himself, with his prisoners and captured ships.

The events at Nootka Sound during the summer of 1789 escalated into a major international crisis, called the Nootka Crisis, which brought Britain and Spain to the brink of war. Peace was maintained through a series of agreements called the Nootka Conventions. It took several years for the terms to be fully agreed upon and carried out. Among other things, Spain agreed to restore the captured ships to their owners and pay them an indemnity.

== Spanish naval vessel, Princesa Real ==
In late 1789, a Spanish force under Francisco de Eliza was sent to reoccupy Nootka Sound. The fleet included the captured Princesa Real, under the command of Manuel Quimper. Eliza arrived at Nootka on 4 April 1790, and found no ships present. Under the terms of the first Nootka Convention, Princess Royal was to be returned to the British at Nootka Sound, but as the port was deserted Eliza decided to make use of the vessel while waiting. He dispatched Princesa Real under Quimper, with López de Haro and Juan Carrasco as pilots, to explore the Strait of Juan de Fuca more fully.

On the way Quimper stopped at Clayoquot Sound and met Wickaninnish and, a day later, Maquinna, whose son had been killed on board Princess Royal the previous year. Quimper and Maquinna were able to begin the process of reconciliation between the Spanish and the Nuu-chah-nulth.

In the summer of 1790, Quimper, Haro, and Carrasco explored the Strait of Juan de Fuca in Princesa Real, carefully charting harbors and performing acts of possession. Quimper made maps of Neah Bay (called Bahía de Núñez Gaona) and Esquimalt Harbour (Puerto de Córdova). On 5 July 1790, Carrasco sighted Admiralty Inlet, the entrance to Puget Sound. Thinking it likely to be a bay he named it Ensenada de Caamaño, after Jacinto Caamaño.

Haro Strait (Canal de López de Haro) and Rosario Strait (Boca de Fidalgo), both of which lead to the Strait of Georgia, were also sighted during the voyage, in addition to Deception Pass (Boca de Flon), Mount Baker (La Gran Montana Carmelo), Port Discovery (Puerto de Quadra), Sooke Basin (Puerta de Revilla Gigedo), Dungeness Spit, the San Juan Islands, Whidbey Island, Fidalgo Island, and others.

Quimper realized that Haro Strait was a major channel worth exploring, but did not have the time. His orders were to return to Nootka by 15 August so that Princesa Real could be returned to the British. Quimper got the ship within sight of Nootka Sound by 10 August, but due to contrary winds and fog he could not enter, despite repeated attempts. Instead, he sailed Princesa Real south to Monterey, California, arriving on 1 September 1790. By November the vessel was back at San Blas.

== Last voyage ==
In 1791 Quimper took Princesa Real on another attempt to return it to the British. He sailed the vessel from San Blas to the Philippines, stopping at Hawaii on the way. Another Spanish captain would take the ship from the Philippines to China, as the Spanish and British governments had agreed that the ship would be returned to its owners in Macau. It turned out that James Colnett arrived in Hawaii in March 1791, just as Quimper was arriving. The two met. Colnett demanded that Princess Royal be turned over at once, while Quimper explained his orders were to take it to the Philippines. Colnett prepared to seize the ship by force. John Kendrick Jr, a former fur trader who had entered Spanish service and was on board Princess Royal, calmed the quarrel. Quimper slipped away at a convenient time and sailed to Manila, arriving in June. By the end of the year Princess Royal had been taken to Macau, but the ship was in such poor condition upon arrival that the British agents refused to accept it. Eventually the British agreed to accept a small payment in cash instead.

== Fate ==
Soon afterwards a typhoon hit Macao and badly damaged Princess Royal. She was later sold for salvage.

== See also ==
- List of historical ships in British Columbia
- Towereroo
