= Caamaño =

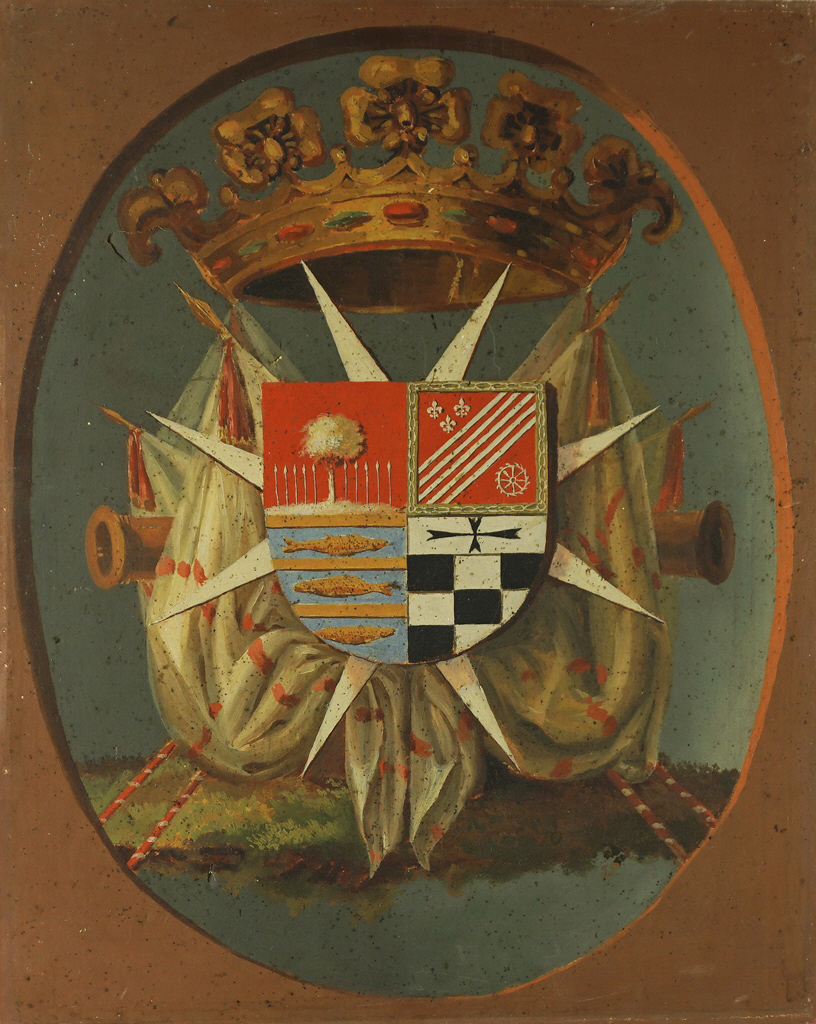
Caamaño y Gayoso arms

Caamaño is a Spanish-language surname. It may refer to:

- Álvaro Eugenio de Mendoza Caamaño y Sotomayor (1671–1761), Spanish aristocrat and priest
- Darlene Caamaño (born 1970), American film producer
- Ernesto Noboa y Caamaño (1889–1927), Ecuadorian poet
- Francisco Caamaño (1932–1973), Dominican politician and colonel
- Francisco Caamaño Domínguez (born 1963), Spanish politician
- Francisco Caamaño Rojas (born 1989), Chilean politician
- Gustavo Caamaño (born 1979), Argentine footballer
- Jacinto Caamaño (1759–1825), Spanish explorer
- Jacinto Jijón y Caamaño (1890–1950), Ecuadorian historian and politician
- José Antonio de Mendoza Caamaño y Sotomayor (1667–1746), Spanish colonial administrator
- José Plácido Caamaño (1837–1901), Ecuadorian politician, 12th President of Ecuador
- Ramón Acha Caamaño (1861–1930), Spanish general
- Vladimir Caamaño (born 1979), American comedian and actor

Locations:

- Alberto Mena Caamaño Museum, a museum in Quito, Ecuador
- Caamaño Passage, strait in British Columbia, Canada
- Caamaño Sound, sound in British Columbia
- Francisco Alberto Caamaño metro station, metro station in Santo Domingo, Dominican Republic

== See also ==
- Camano (disambiguation)
- Carcamano
