= Nepean Sound =

Coordinates: 53°11′00″N 129°40′00″W

Nepean Sound is a sound on the North Coast of British Columbia, Canada. It lies north of Caamaño Sound, and separates Banks, Pitt, Campania and Trutch Islands.

== See also ==
- Estevan Group
