= Laredo =

Laredo may refer to:

== Places ==
- Laredo, Spain, the original Spanish town with this name
- Laredo District, Peru

=== United States and Mexico ===
- Laredo–Nuevo Laredo, a bi-national metropolitan area
  - Laredo, Texas
    - Downtown Laredo
    - Laredo International Airport
- Laredo, Missouri
- Laredo, Montana
- Laredo Ranchettes, Texas
- Laredo, Rocky Boys Indian Reservation, Montana

=== Canada ===
- Laredo Channel, British Columbia
- Laredo Inlet, British Columbia
- Laredo Sound, British Columbia

== Sports teams ==
- Laredo Heat, a soccer team based in Laredo, Texas
- Laredo Lemurs, a baseball team based in Laredo, Texas
- Laredo Rattlesnakes, an indoor football team based in Laredo, Texas
- CD Laredo, a football team based in Laredo, Spain

=== Defunct teams in Laredo, Texas ===
- Laredo Apaches, a baseball team
- Laredo Broncos, a baseball team
- Laredo Bucks, an ice hockey team
- Laredo Law, an arena football team
- Laredo Lobos, an arena football team

== Media ==
- Laredo (TV series), a 1965 western series starring Peter Brown
- Laredo, a fictional planet colonised by Hispanic people, in the Dread Empire's Fall series by Walter Jon Williams
- Laredo (album), a 1990 album by Steve Wariner
- "Laredo" (Chris Cagle song), on the 2000 album Play It Loud
- "Laredo" (Band of Horses song), a 2010 song by Band of Horses
- "Laredo", a song by Babes in Toyland from the 1993 EP Painkillers
- "Laredo", a song by Tomahawk from the 2001 album Tomahawk

== Vehicles ==
- Laredo, a special trim package for the GMC Caballero, 1978–79
- Laredo, a trim package for the Jeep Cherokee (SJ), 1974–1983
- Laredo, a trim package for the Jeep Cherokee (XJ), 1985–1992
- Laredo, a trim package for the Jeep Grand Cherokee, 1993–98 (ZJ), 1999-2004 (WJ), 2005-10 (WK), 2011–2020 (WK2), 2021- (WL)

== Other uses ==
- Laredo (surname)
- Laredo (cigarette), a tobacco kit from Brown & Williamson

== See also ==
- Streets of Laredo (disambiguation)
