= Kitasoo Spirit Bear Conservancy =

Conservancy in British Columbia, Canada

- IUCN category II (national park)
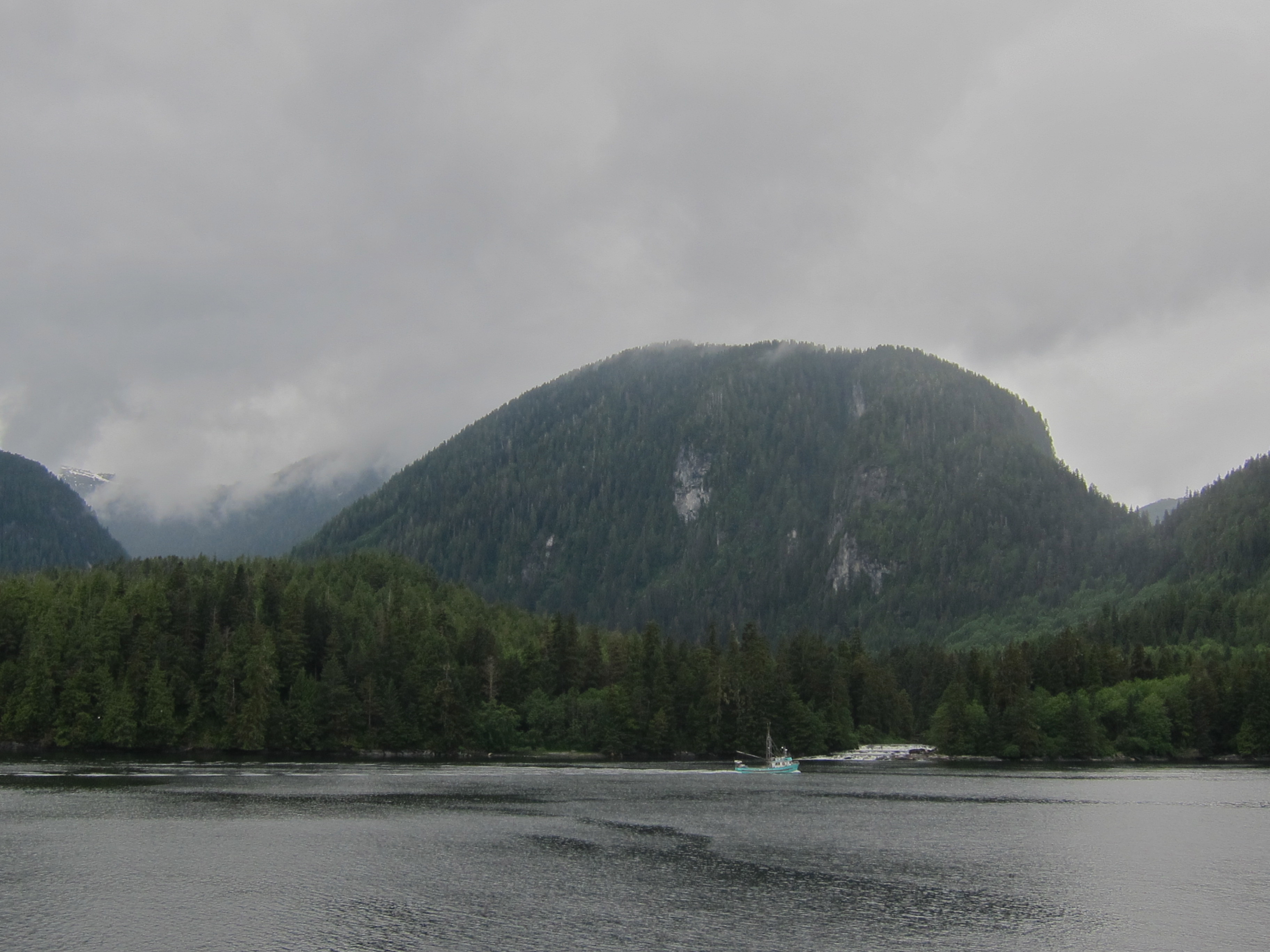
- Kitasoo Spirit Bear Conservancy and the Canoona River on Princess Royal Island, British Columbia

- Location within British Columbia
- Location: British Columbia, Canada
- Nearest city: Klemtu
- Coordinates: 52.78785°N 128.80861°W
- Area: 102,875 ha (397.20 sq mi)
- Designation: Conservancy
- Established: July 13, 2006
- Governing body: BC Parks
- Website: bcparks.ca/kitasoo-spirit-bear-conservancy/

The Kitasoo Spirit Bear Conservancy was established in 2006 surrounding Laredo Inlet on Princess Royal Island, British Columbia. The Conservancy extends to nearby islands, totalling an area of approximately 102,875 hectares. It is the largest conservancy created to protect the Spirit Bear, a subspecies of black bear that may have a white appearance and is of high significance to the Kitasoo/Xaixais peoples.
