= Laredo Channel =

- Location of Laredo Channel
- Location: British Columbia, Canada
- Coordinates: 52°44′58″N 129°5′18″W
- Type: Channel
- Ocean/sea sources: Pacific Ocean

Laredo Channel is a channel in the North Coast region of the Canadian province of British Columbia, separating Princess Royal Island and Aristazabal Island. It connects with Laredo Sound to the south and Caamaño Sound to the north. In 1792 the Spanish naval officer Jacinto Caamaño, commanding the frigate Aranzazu, explored the area and named Laredo Channel (Canal de Laredo), probably after the port city of Laredo, Spain.
