= James Colnett =

Royal Navy officer (died 1806)

Captain James Colnett
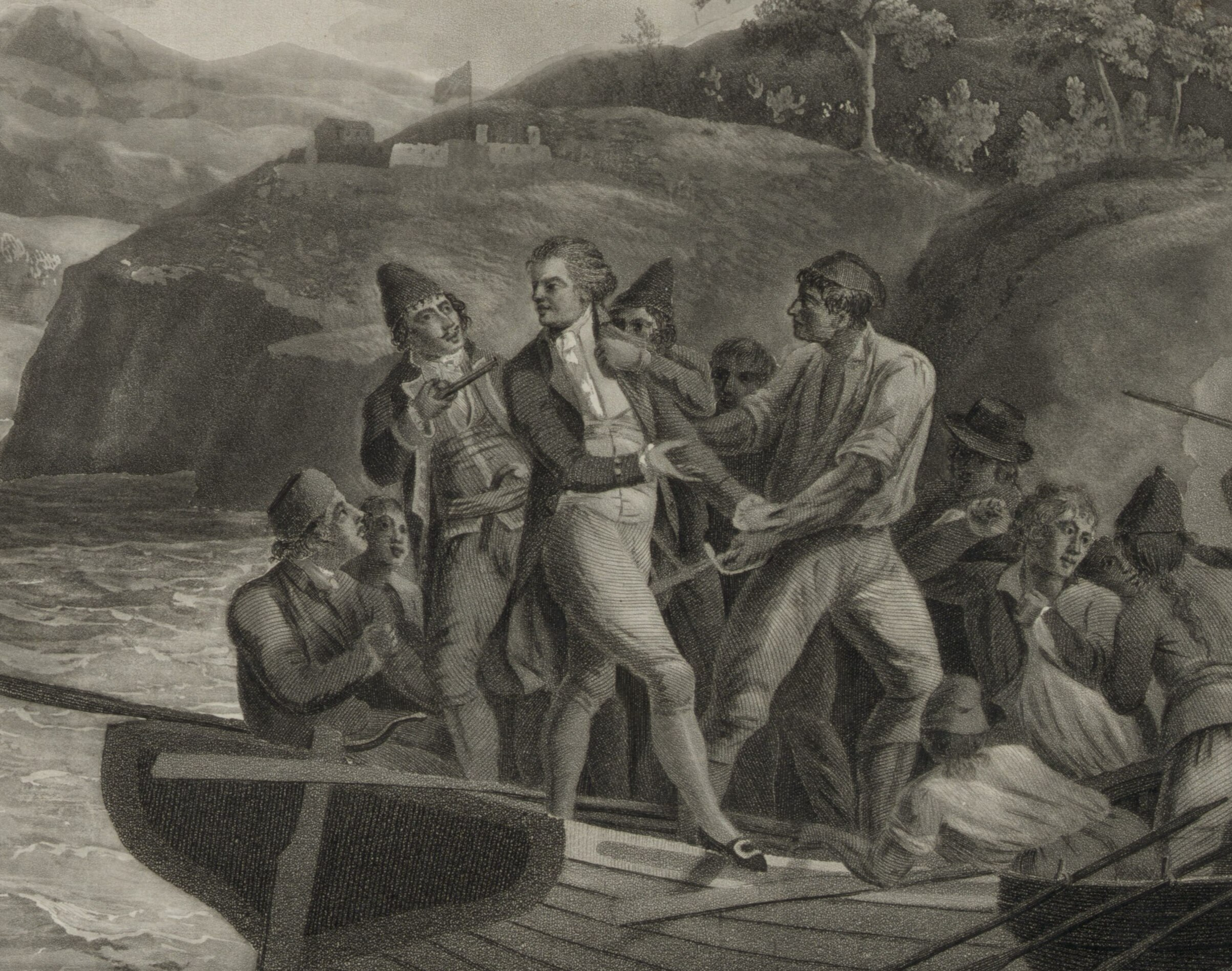
- Detail of an engraving of Colnett's arrest with him in the centre
- Born: c. 1753; Devonport, Devon
- Died: 1 September 1806; Great Ormond Street, London
- Military career
- Allegiance: Great Britain; United Kingdom
- Branch: Royal Navy
- Service years: 1770–1805
- Rank: Captain
- Commands: HMS Merlin; HMS Hawk; HMS Hussar; HMS Glatton
- Conflicts: American Revolutionary War; Nootka Crisis; French Revolutionary Wars; Napoleonic Wars

Captain James Colnett (c. 1753 – 1 September 1806) was a Royal Navy officer, explorer and a fur trader. He served under James Cook during Cook's second voyage of exploration. Later he led two private trading expeditions that involved collecting sea otter pelts in the Pacific Northwest of North America and selling them in Canton, China, where the East India Company maintained a trading post. Wintering in the recently discovered Hawaiian Islands was a key component of the new trade system.

Colnett is remembered largely for his involvement in the Nootka Crisis of 1789—initially a dispute between British traders and the Spanish Navy over the use of Nootka Sound on Vancouver Island that became an international crisis that led Britain and Spain to the brink of war before being peacefully resolved through diplomacy and the signing of the Nootka Conventions.

Due to Colnett's central role in the initial incident that sparked the international crisis, Colnett's account of his second fur trading voyage, including the events at Nootka Sound in 1789, was published in 1940, as part of the Champlain Society's General Series. His first trading voyage journal remained unpublished until 2005.

== Early life ==
Colnett was born in Devon at Devonport in 1753, and was baptised on 18 October at Stoke Damerel parish church, Plymouth. His parents were James and Sarah (née Lang) Colnett. He had two older sisters and one younger brother. Very little is known about his life until he joined the Royal Navy as an able-bodied seaman in 1770.

Colnett joined the Royal Navy in June 1770, initially serving as an able seaman aboard HMS Hazard, and then aboard HMS Scorpion as a midshipman under Lieutenant James Cook from September until December 1771, when both Cook and Colnett moved to HMS Resolution. Colnett served as a midshipman during Cook's second voyage to the Pacific Ocean between 1772 and 1775. After returning to England in 1775, Colnett continued to serve in the Royal Navy during the American War of Independence, being appointed gunner aboard HMS Juno on 1 January 1776 and then as master of HMS Adventure. He rose in the ranks, passing his lieutenant's examination on 4 February 1779, and ten days later, on 14 February, he was appointed third lieutenant of HMS Bienfaisant. He was with Bienfaisant until 1783, when he joined HMS Pegase as her first lieutenant. On 17 August 1786 he went on half pay as work for naval officers fell following the end of hostilities.

Between 1786 and 1791 Colnett led two private fur-trading ventures. With the Royal Navy's approval and a leave of absence he was first given command of a two-vessel fur trading expedition to the Pacific Northwest coast, Hawaii, and China. The vessels included Prince of Wales and Princess Royal. Afterwards, a second expedition was organized with the Argonaut and the Princess Royal. The second expedition culminated in the Nootka Crisis. The first voyage was under the aegis of the London-based King George's Sound Company, first known as Richard Cadman Etches and Company, which owned the ships. The second was a joint venture of the King George's Sound Company and John Meares and his partners. Both companies were exploring the possibilities of collecting sea otter pelts along the Pacific Northwest coast, via trade with the indigenous peoples, and selling the goods in China. The idea had its origins in Cook's third voyage, during which sea otter pelts obtained along the northwest coast of America, from Nootka Sound northwards, were sold for high prices and great profit in Canton.

== First fur trading voyage, 1786–1788 ==
During the first fur-trading venture Colnett was in command of a two-vessel expedition. Colnett himself was captain of the 171-ton ship Prince of Wales. The second vessel was the 65-ton sloop Princess Royal, under Charles Duncan. The ships were owned by the King George's Sound Company, or Richard Cadman Etches and Company, and operated under licenses from the South Sea Company and the East India Company, which had a monopoly on British trade in the Pacific Ocean. The two ships left England on 23 September 1786, rounded Cape Horn, and reached the Pacific Northwest late in the summer of 1787. After trading for furs with the indigenous peoples in the vicinity of the Haida Gwaii archipelago, Aristazabal Island, and Banks Island, Colnett and Duncan sailed to the Hawaiian Islands where they spent the winter. While on the coast of present-day British Columbia they had a series of first contact encounters with some of the Kitkatla Tsimshian. In Hawaii they were involved in several violent conflicts with the islanders, including one at Waimea Bay, during which between five and fourteen Hawaiians were killed.

During his voyage, Colnett became the first European to see parts of southern Haida Gwaii. Juan Pérez had visited northern Haida Gwaii in 1774, but had not gone ashore. Colnett and his crew were among the first Europeans to set foot on the islands. They were also the first British explorers to contact the Tsimshian and southern Heiltsuk people.

Although his primary focus was collecting sea otter pelts, Colnett explored the complex coastline in detail, apparently in hopes of finding the fabled Northwest Passage. His journal contains twelve maps of various channels, harbours, inlets, and other coastal features.

After spending the winter of 1787–88 in Hawaii, Colnett and Duncan returned to the Pacific Northwest to acquire more furs. Once on the coast they parted ways and operated separately, unlike the previous year when they remained in company. After trading through the summer Charles Duncan heading south for Nootka Sound. Before arriving he heard from fellow fur trader John Meares that Colnett was not at Nootka. Therefore, Duncan did not stop there but instead continued trading for furs south of Nootka Sound, in the vicinity of Clayoquot Sound and near the entrance of the Strait of Juan de Fuca. In August 1788 Duncan sailed the Princess Royal to Hawaii where he found Colnett and the Prince of Wales. Together they sailed to Canton, China, arriving in late November 1788. They sold their cargo of sea otter pelts. The Prince of Wales was taken back to England via the Cape of Good Hope, but James Colnett stayed in China. The Princess Royal also remained in order to carry out a second fur trading voyage starting the next year. Colnett was given command of another two-vessel expedition. The Argonaut sailed under Colnett, with the Princess Royal under Thomas Hudson.

== Second fur trading voyage, 1789–1791 ==
During the time of Colnett's first voyage two other British ships, owned by John Meares and his partners, were trading on the North West coast. Meares had chosen not to pay for licenses from the East India Company and South Sea Company, instead striving to conceal the ship's illegal conduct by using the Portuguese flag. During the winter of 1788–89 the owners of all four vessels decided to form a joint venture under the protection of the licenses, although the South Sea Company license applied only to the Prince of Wales and Princess Royal. The joint venture had no firm name; Meares called it variously "The Associated Merchants of London and India" or "The United Company of British Merchants Trading to the North West Coast of America". Colnett called it "The South Sea Company of London". It was loosely referred to as "this united Company". Colnett purchased a vessel at Macao, and named her Argonaut. She had a burthen of about 120 tons, and had been registered at Calcutta.

In early 1789 Colnett was given command of the joint undertaking as a whole. As captain of the Argonaut he gave over command of its tender, the Princess Royal, to Thomas Hudson. The goal of the joint venture was not just to send vessels to the North West coast but also to set up a permanent trading post at Nootka Sound, to be named Fort Pitt. Meares claimed he had purchased land there from Chief Maquinna of the Nuu-chah-nulth (Nootka) people. The post could be built on Meares's land. Later, the question of whether Meares had actually acquired land from Maquinna became an issue of contention. Even if he had, there were unresolvable questions about the amount of land purchased and its location. In time Chief Maquinna denied that any such purchase had been made, saying instead that the Spanish had the only rightful claim to land at Nootka Sound. Meares, one of the primary forces behind the venture, hoped that a permanent post at Nootka Sound would establish his own dominance in the lucrative marine fur trade. However, before the British ships arrived, Spanish forces had already occupied the harbour and established their own fort. By the time Colnett's Argonaut arrived at Nootka Sound, the first phase of the crisis had already begun. The Spanish had taken control of the port and seized Captain Douglas and his ship.

== Nootka Crisis ==
=== Background ===
Before the Nootka Crisis of 1789, Spain had long held that all foreign sailors in the Pacific Ocean were to be treated as enemies. Spanish claims of sovereignty, especially on the west coasts of the Americas, dated back centuries. One of the first serious threats to the Spanish claim came from the extension of Russian fur-trading activity from Siberia to Alaska during the middle and later parts of the 18th century. Spain reacted not only by expanding the foothold already gained in Alta California but also by launching a series of exploration and reconnaissance voyages from San Blas, Mexico, to Alaska. The purpose of these voyages was not only to ascertain the Russian threat but to reinforce their claims of sovereignty by right of first-discovery and through the use of formal possession-taking rituals, which were still regarded as a meaningful part of international law. Another purpose was to search for a possible Northwest Passage, which, if it existed and fell under the control of another nation such as Britain, could prove disastrous to New Spain's Pacific coast. Juan Pérez was the first to sail to the far north, reaching Haida Gwaii in 1774. Subsequent expeditions were launched in 1775, 1779, and 1788. Detailed information about Russian activities in Alaska was acquired in 1788, including ominous indications that Russia might seize control of Nootka Sound. This, in addition to the rapidly increasing numbers of fur traders working the Pacific Northwest coast—mainly British but also American and others—coupled with Spain's firm claim of sovereignty north to 61°N latitude (the vicinity of Prince William Sound, Alaska), and the lack of any Spanish outpost north of California, made it imperative that a firm stand be taken. During the 1780s Nootka Sound had become the focal point of all these conflicting factors. It was perhaps not the best port of the region, but it was well known and well charted, fairly easy to reach, and usefully located at a general base of operations and a place of rendezvous. Over the years it had become the fur-trader's primary harbour and gathering point. Factors such as these resulted in Russia, Britain, and Spain all deciding to build a fort there, in order to solidify their claims and interests. From Spain's perspective, which had long regarded the entire region as Spanish territory, the occupation of Nootka Sound would be the first step toward creating a new province of New Spain, north of California and south of Alaska. Implicit in such a plan was the restriction of free trade by other nations, a policy the Spanish had long enforced within the lands of the empire. The position of the British government, since the days of Queen Elizabeth, had been that its subjects had the right to navigate the ocean and visit, trade, and make settlements anywhere not already occupied by a civilized nation.

=== The Spanish claim the Sound ===
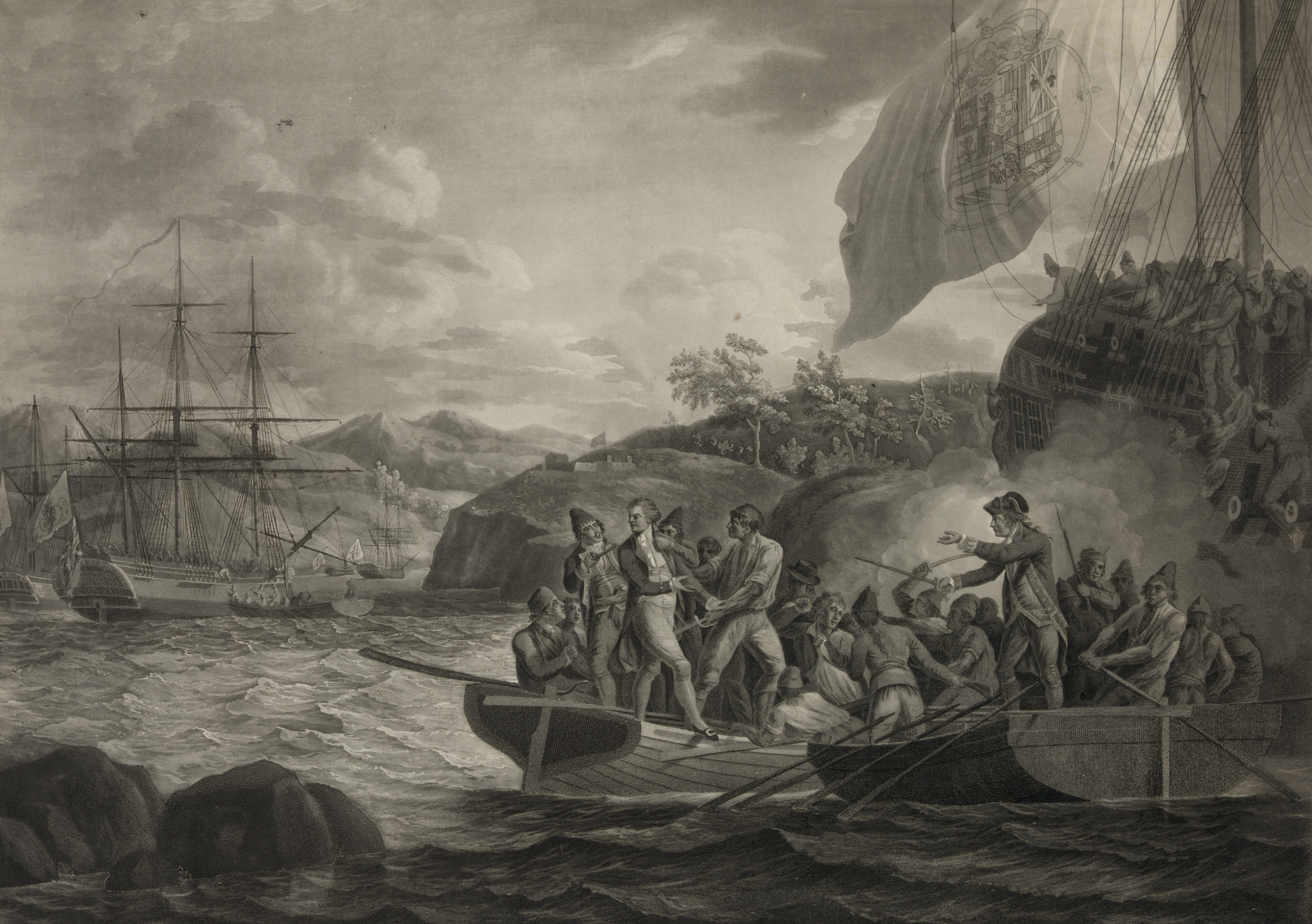
The Spanish taking Colnett and Argonaut prisoner at Nootka Sound

In 1789 a Spanish expedition under Estebàn José Martínez set sail from San Blas in order to occupy Nootka Sound. Arriving on 5 May 1789, the Spanish quickly built a few buildings and a small fort with the Spanish flag clearly displayed. Martinez formally occupied the land and began checking the papers of visiting vessels. Two American fur trading ships were already anchored in the sound, one of which was the Columbia Rediviva, and more arrived later, including the Lady Washington, under Robert Gray. Soon after Martínez secured control of the Nootka Sound a number of other vessels arrived, including the Princess Royal, under Thomas Hudson, along with Iphigenia (William Douglas); the Argonaut, under James Colnett, and North West America, under Robert Funter—all British fur trading vessels. Martínez was particularly troubled by the appearance of Colnett's Argonaut. Not only was the Argonaut carrying material and supplies obviously intended for the construction of a permanent base, but a group of Chinese laborers were also on board, one of the first examples of "coolie" labour in the Pacific Northwest. Martínez, whose warships gave him de facto control, asserted Spanish sovereignty. After a heated exchange between the two men, Martínez had Colnett arrested, along with the crew of the Argonaut. Martínez wrote in his journal about personal insults slung at him by Colnett. He was also irritated by Colnett having sailed the Argonaut under Portuguese rather than a British flag, which he felt was deceptive. After a complicated series of events, Martínez ended up with three captured ships and their crews, including the Argonaut, Princess Royal, and North West America. Hudson had taken the Princess Royal into Nootka Sound earlier and had been allowed to leave on the condition he proceed to China. Instead, he collected more furs from the region and returned to Nootka Sound, expecting Martínez would no longer be there. Hudson did not intend to enter the sound but the Princess Royal was becalmed on an incoming tide. A Spanish longboat captured the ship and towed it in.

The prisoners were eventually released and the ships returned. The Chinese workers were forced to help build Fort San Miguel, a small battery of Spanish cannon overlooking the entrance to Friendly Cove, the main harbour of Nootka Sound at the time.

=== Nootka Conventions ===
The British ships captured by Martínez, along with Colnett and his crew, still prisoners, were taken to the Spanish naval base at San Blas, Mexico. In Britain, King George III and British Prime Minister William Pitt the Younger soon learned what had happened to the British ships, officers, and crews. The arrest of James Colnett, who was after all still an officer of the Royal Navy, was particularly troublesome in England. Angered by the incident and by ongoing competition with Spain for the Pacific Northwest, the British threatened war. France, a Spanish ally, was coping with the early stages of the French Revolution and would not be able to fight for Spain in an armed conflict. Without the French, Spain could not realistically secure their massive North and South American territories in the event of war with Britain. Bowing to pressure from Britain, Spain capitulated and agreed to sign the Nootka Conventions in 1790, ending the Nootka Crisis and beginning the first phase of the Spanish withdrawal from the Pacific Northwest. Three separate Nootka Conventions were signed and it took over five years to resolve the many outstanding problems. Among other things, Spain agreed to restore the captured ships to their owners and pay them an indemnity. Both nations sent officials to Nootka Sound in order to carry out the details of the Nootka Conventions. George Vancouver served as Britain's representative at Nootka, while Juan Francisco de la Bodega y Quadra served as Spain's. While both were respectful toward one another and even became friends, they could not reach an agreement about how to carry out their instructions. They decided instead to await further instructions. At this time, they decided to name the large island on which Nootka was now proven to be located as "Quadra and Vancouver Island". Years later, as Spanish influence declined, the name was shortened to simply Vancouver Island.

Spain continued to occupy Nootka Sound until 28 March 1795. Under the Nootka Convention, Britain and Spain agreed not to establish any permanent base at Nootka Sound, but ships from either nation could visit. The two nations also agreed to prevent any other nation from establishing sovereignty.

=== Further trading ===
After the initial crisis at Nootka Sound, James Colnett was taken to San Blas, New Spain, and kept under Spanish custody until released in May 1790. His company's ship, the Argonaut, was returned to his command. He was still not permitted to leave until July, after which he sailed north to Clayoquot Sound where he resumed his fur-trading activities. In early 1791, he revisited Nootka Sound. By then Francisco de Eliza was the Spanish commandant at Nootka. Colnett had been given a passport by the Vice Roy of New Spain allowing him to sail to Nootka Sound in order to receive the Princess Royal, which had been seized in 1789, but to then leave the coast because it was, the Vice Roy said, Spanish territory. Colnett was also forbidden to trade with the indigenous peoples. However, when Colnett arrived at Nootka he told Eliza, the commandant, that the passport had been lost at sea. Colnett spent about five months trading along the coast, acquiring about 1,100 sea otter pelts.

By the time Colnett arrived at Nootka Sound the Princess Royal had sailed to San Blas, arriving there about 13 November 1790. Therefore, it could not be returned to Colnett as required by the Nootka Conventions. The governments of Spain and Britain agreed that the vessel would be returned to its owners in Macau. Manuel Quimper sailed it from San Blas to the Philippines, stopping at Hawaii on the way. Another Spanish officer was to take the vessel from the Philippines to Macau. Meanwhile, Colnett, having finished trading on the North West coast, also sailed to China via Hawaii. By chance both Colnett and Quimper arrived at Hawaii in March 1791. The two met. Colnett demanded that the Princess Royal be turned over at once, while Quimper explained his orders were to take it to the Philippines. Colnett became angry and prepared to seize the ship by force. The quarrel was calmed by John Kendrick Jr. (sometimes known as Juan Kendrick) who had come to Nootka in 1788 aboard the Columbia Rediviva with his father John Kendrick, entered Spanish service as a pilot, and was now on board the Princess Royal. Quimper slipped away at a convenient time and sailed to Manila, arriving in June.

Colnett sailed from Hawaii to China, arriving at Macau on 30 May 1791. To his chagrin he found that the Chinese officials had prohibited all ships with furs from entering the port of Canton. China was at war with Russia and thought the ban on fur trading would injure Russia. The prohibition was imposed in early 1791 and lifted on 30 May 1792. Unable to sell his cargo, Colnett sailed to Japan in a bold but unsuccessful attempt to trade there. Thus the Argonaut under Colnett was the first British ship to try to re-open trade with Japan since 1673, when the East India Company's ship Return tried and likewise failed. Eventually Colnett was able to sell some of his furs in northern China. He then sailed for England with his remaining cargo, which he sold to the East India Company for £9,760.

== South Seas survey ==
In the whale fishery, British vessels began in 1788 to enter the Pacific by way of Cape Horn. Long voyages often required ports where ships might refit and reprovision, and crew might recover. Spanish ports in the Pacific were so restrictive that shipowners offered to take a naval officer in one of their whaling vessels to search for safe anchorages. Colnett was selected to command the Rattler purchased by Samuel Enderby & Sons. On 4 January 1793 he set sail.

Adverse weather in the North Atlantic made it necessary to put in at Rio de Janeiro. After repairs and provisioning, Colnett went in search of Isle Grande, an island sighted in 1675 by Anthony de la Roché. He was unable to find it but met a great number of right whales, discovering a new whaling ground (roughly 40-45° S, 35° W). On 23 March "two balls of fire, about the size of cricket balls, fell on board."

Rounding Cape Horn, Colnett sailed north along the coast of Chile evaluating potential anchorages, whaling off Mocha, and landing with difficulty at San Félix. He encountered great numbers of seals at an island near the port of Pisco, Peru. He followed the coast, then sailed to the Galapagos where he anchored and explored. They filled a barrel with an unusual, heavy sand or topaz. This island and its neighbor were not on any map in Colnett's possession, so he named them Chatham and Hood.

Colnett's chart of the Galapagos

Colnett interrupted his survey of the Galapagos, returning to the mainland and continuing north. For the next eight months he cruised for sperm whales, sailing as far north as Baha California and returning along the coast of Central America. He searched for islands to refresh his crew, and to add to the ship's supply of water, wood, and food. He anchored at Cocos Island, Socorro, and Coiba. Although they tryed out more than ten whales, Colnett thought the whaling business had failed. He returned to the Galapagos.

It was mid-March and the whales were numerous. Colnett observed them coming and passing all day long in one extended line. The whales would leave and return in a few days in even greater numbers. Everyone foresaw a very successful voyage. For three months Colnett carried on the survey he had begun earlier, mapping and naming the islands. Regarding James's Isle, he wrote: "This place is, in every respect, calculated for refreshment or relief for crews after a long and tedious voyage, as it abounds with wood, and good anchorage".There were plenty of fish and green turtle, but the land tortoise "was considered by all of us as the most delicious food we had ever tasted."

The return to England was by way of Cape Horn and Saint Helena, arriving at Cowes on 2 November 1794. Colnett drew his own charts which were published in 1798 by cartographer Aaron Arrowsmith. His account of the voyage appeared the same year.

== Later life ==
Colnett returned to England after the outbreak of the French Revolutionary Wars and was promoted to commander on 19 December 1794. He was given command of the sloop HMS Merlin, and in March 1795 examined the coastal defences of the east coast of England from the River Thames to Boston aboard the galley HMS Hawk, subsequently producing a report for the Admiralty. He was advanced to post-captain on 4 October 1796 and appoint to command HMS Hussar the following day. His period of command was short-lived: Hussar was wrecked off the coast of Brittany and Colnett was captured and imprisoned for six months by the French. On his release he was tried by court-martial for the loss of his ship, but was acquitted. After his release he tried to convince the Royal Navy to launch a surprise attack against Spain's poorly defended Pacific coast. On 29 June 1802, he was appointed to command the transport HMS Glatton, on what became his last Pacific voyage. In command of Glatton, he sailed on 23 September with 399 convicts and some free settlers to Australia. Only 12 of the convicts died during the voyage. Before departing Sydney, Colnett unsuccessfully petitioned Governor Philip Gidley King for a free pardon for one of the female convicts, so that she might share his cabin for the return voyage to England. His petition having failed, Colnett set sail for home with a cargo of timber for use in the Royal dockyards. He remained in command of Glatton until 7 March 1805, when he retired on half-pay. He died at his lodgings at Great Ormond Street in London on 1 September 1806. The bulk of his estate he left to his daughter, Elizabeth, although he had never married.

== Legacy ==
There are several places named after James Colnett including Bahía Colnett (bay) and nearby Cabo Colnett (cape) on Mexico's Baja California peninsula, 30°57′N 116°17′W; Mount Colnett on New Caledonia, 20°31′S 164°42′E; Cabo Colnett (cape) and nearby Bahía Colnett (bay) in Tierra del Fuego, Argentina, 54°44′S 64°19′W; and Mount Colnett on Meares Island, British Columbia, Canada, 49°10′28″N 125°50′14″W. Argonaut Point, in Nootka Sound, British Columbia, is named for Colnett's ship, 49°43′14″N 126°29′28″W.
