= Estevan Sound =

Coordinates: 53°05′00″N 129°32′00″W

Estevan Sound is a sound on the North Coast of British Columbia, extending northwest from Caamaño Sound between Campania Island (E) and the Estevan Group archipelago (W).
