= Principe Channel =

Strait in the British Columbia, Canada

- Interactive map of Principe Channel
- Location: Range 4 Coast Land District
- Coordinates: 53°25′34″N 129°56′58″W
- Type: Channel
- Part of: Inside Passage
- Basin countries: Canada

Principe Channel is a strait on the North Coast of British Columbia, Canada, located between Banks Island (to the West) and Pitt Island (to the East), and is bounded on the south by a line from Deer Point on Banks Island, to Ring Point on Pitt Island, and bounded on the north by a line west from Keswar Point on McCauley Island to the shore of Banks Island.

The channel is part of a Confined Channel Assessment Area, part of the North Coast Waterway, and the principal navigable route between Kitimat and Browning Entrance.

The Kitselas and Gitxaalahave also designated the channel as containing traditional harvesting areas.

== Etymology ==
Named Spanish: Canal del Principe in 1792 by Lieutenant Commander Jacinto Caamaño. Principe means "prince".
