= Gitxaala Nation =

Location of Gitxaala Nation

The Gitxaała Nation is a First Nations government located in the village of Lax Klan (also called Kitkatla on Canadian maps), in the North Coast region of the Canadian province of British Columbia. Gitxaała is the name of the people, who are Gitxaała, not 'Tsimshian,' and their main village is Lax Klan, located on Dolphin Island. The Gitxaała central community of Lax Klan is the oldest, longest continuously-inhabited society on the north coast. https://gitxaalanation.com

== Governance ==
The Gitxaała Nation has a Governing Council consisting of seven elected members and a Hereditary Table (Na Ha'litxooxgm Sagayt Wan Sm'gygyet). The Governing Council is responsible for the administration of programs and services such as housing, public works and health services within the community. The Hereditary Table serves an advisory role to the Governing Council and decides on the distribution of resources and territory.

=== Governing Council members ===
Position	Name
Chief Councillor	Linda Innes
Deputy Chief Councillor	Brenna Johnson-Innes
Councillor	Joscelin Lewis
Councillor	Rowena Ridley
Councillor	Gail Watkinson
Councillor	Elliott Moody
Youth Councillor	Jamie Angus

== See also ==
- Kitkatla (band)
