= Banks Island (British Columbia) =

Island on the coast of the Canadian province of British Columbia

Banks
Native name: Ḵaa'al
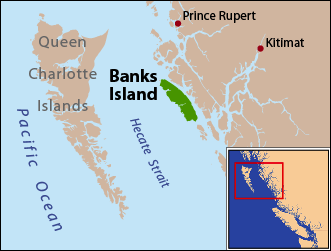
- Banks Island is located on the east side of Hecate Strait
- Interactive map of Banks

Geography
- Location: Hecate Strait
- Coordinates: 53°24′12″N 130°07′49″W
- Area: 1,034.18 km^{2} (399.30 sq mi) (2026)
- Area rank: 49th in Canada & 322nd worldwide
- Length: 72 km (44.7 mi)
- Width: 9.7–18 km (6.0–11.2 mi)
- Highest elevation: 536 m (1759 ft)
- Highest point: unnamed

Administration
- Canada
- Province: British Columbia

Banks Island is an island on the coast of the Canadian province of British Columbia, it is 72 km (45 mi) long, and ranges in width from 9.7 to 18 km (6.0 to 11.2 mi). The island is 1,034.18 km^{2} (399.30 sq mi) in area, and reaches 536 m (1,759 ft) in elevation. Banks island is located within the North Coast Regional District, and is situated south of Prince Rupert, on Hecate Strait, east of and opposite Haida Gwaii. To its east is Pitt Island and McCauley Island, both across Principe Channel. To its west is Bonilla Island. To its south lies the archipelago of the Estevan Group, beyond which is Caamaño Sound.

== Features ==
=== Banks Nii Łuutiksm Conservancy ===
The Banks Nii Łuutiksm Conservancy is located at the north end of the island, and contains approximately 19,121 ha (47,250 acres). It includes a number of small lakes, several archaeological sites, and sheltered inlets suitable for anchoring. The Gitxaała harvest traditional intertidal marine resources in this area. The conservancy was designated in 2006 as part of the North Coast Land and Resource Management Plan.

=== Colby Bay ===
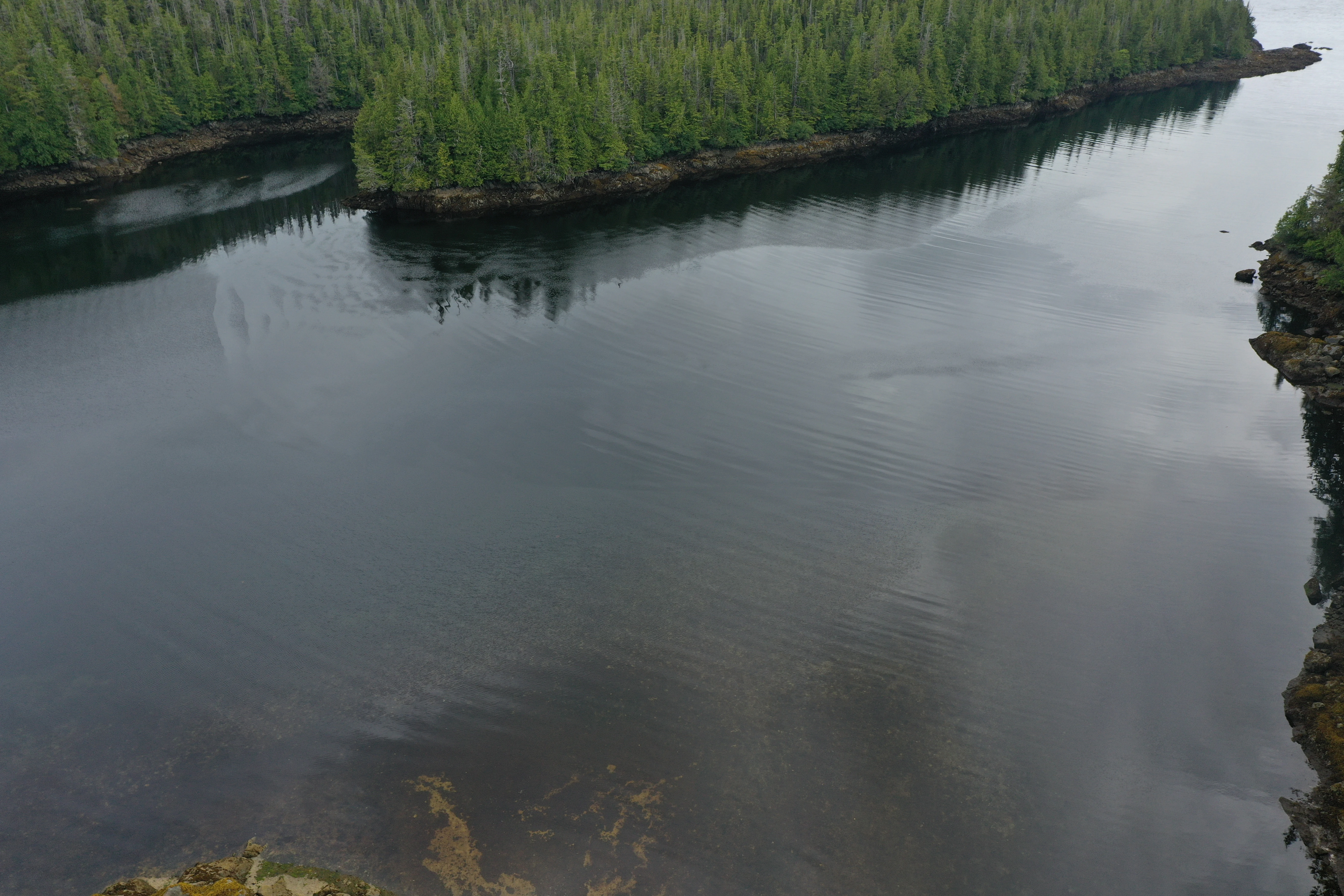
Colby Bay, Banks Island, British Columbia

Colby Bay is a protected harbour located off Principe Channel on the east side of Banks Island. The bay bottom is mud with good holding, and is surrounded with old-growth cedar forests.

== Etymology ==
Banks Island was named in 1787 by Archibald Menzies, botanist and surgeon of the fur trading vessel Princess Royal, in honour of Sir Joseph Banks, who was then president of the Royal Society and had accompanied James Cook during the exploratory voyages of 1768–1771. Banks was instrumental in encouraging British fur trading voyages to the Pacific Northwest, such as Duncan's.

== History ==
In late August, 1787, the British fur traders, James Colnett and Charles Duncan arrived at Banks Island. They anchored their two ships, Prince of Wales and Princess Royal at the south end of Banks Island in Calamity Bay (which they named Port Ball). The ships remained there for eleven weeks while being repaired. During this time there was a series of first contact encounters between the British and some of the Gitxaała (Kitkatla) Tsimshian. Minor conflicts escalated into larger ones, including the theft of a British longboat. Violence soon followed, with the use of muskets, pistols, and cannons by the British. A number of Tsimshian were killed, wounded, and taken captive. Also during their time at Calamity Bay the British used boats to explore the complex waterways of the region, including Principe Channel, Douglas Channel, and Laredo Sound, in the process producing the first significant maps of this part of the coast. The Spanish explorer Jacinto Caamaño explored the region in 1792, passing through Principe Channel in the corvette Aranzazu. Caamaño was aided by copies of maps made by Colnett. The incompletely explored inlets on the maps prompted Juan Vicente de Güemes, the Viceroy of New Spain to order an exploratory expedition, which was given to Caamaño. During his voyage, Caamaño spent a month's sojourn at the southern end of Pitt Island, during which time he had considerable interaction with the Tsimshian of Pitt and Banks Islands.
