= Banks Nii Łuutiksm Conservancy =

Conservancy in British Columbia, Canada

- IUCN category II (national park)
- Location within British Columbia
- Location: British Columbia, Canada
- Nearest city: Kitkatla, British Columbia
- Coordinates: 53.557°N 130.4455°W
- Area: 19,121 ha (73.83 sq mi)
- Designation: Conservancy
- Established: 2006
- Governing body: BC Parks

The Banks Nii Łuutiksm Conservancy is located at the northern end of Banks Island along the coast of British Columbia, Canada.

== Background ==
The conservancy was designated in 2006 and is located to the south of the village of Kitkatla.

The conservancy protects many marine and terrestrial species and contains a number of archaeological sites. The area has a long history of use and importance to First Nations and is located in the territory of the Gitxaala.
