= Lax Kul Nii Luutiksm/Bonilla Conservancy =

Conservancy in British Columbia, Canada

- IUCN category II (national park)
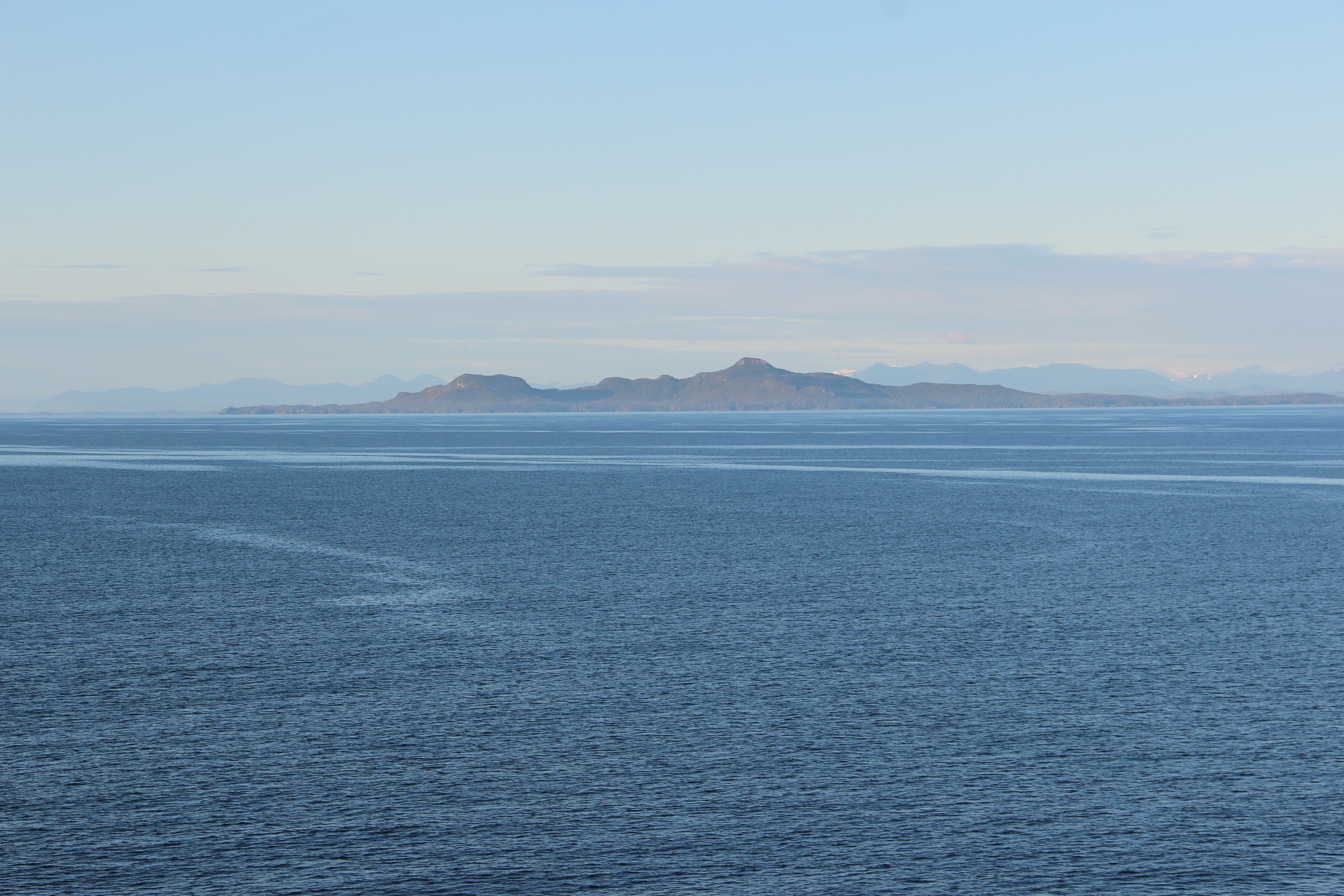
- Photo looking west in Hecate Strait toward Bonilla Island

- Location within British Columbia
- Location: British Columbia, Canada
- Nearest city: Kitkatla
- Coordinates: 53.4869°N 130.6084°W
- Area: 1,584 ha (6.12 sq mi)
- Designation: Conservancy
- Established: July 13, 2006
- Governing body: BC Parks

The Lax Kul Nii Luutiksm/Bonilla Conservancy was established in 2006 surrounding Bonilla Island (Lax Kul), located along the North Coast of British Columbia, Canada.

The conservancy protects predator-free islets for seabirds and numerous marine and terrestrial species. Located in this conservancy is a pre-contact Gitxaala village site and shell midden.
