= Camaño =

Camaño is a surname. Notable people with the surname include:

- Aída Camaño (born 1984), Uruguayan football player
- Eduardo Camaño (born 1946), Argentine politician
- Graciela Camaño (born 1953), Argentine lawyer and politician
- Iker Camaño (born 1979), Spanish cyclist
- Melitón Camaño (1868–1931), Argentine journalist

== See also ==
- Camano (disambiguation)
- Caamaño
