= Laredo Sound =

Coordinates: 52°29′00″N 128°53′00″W

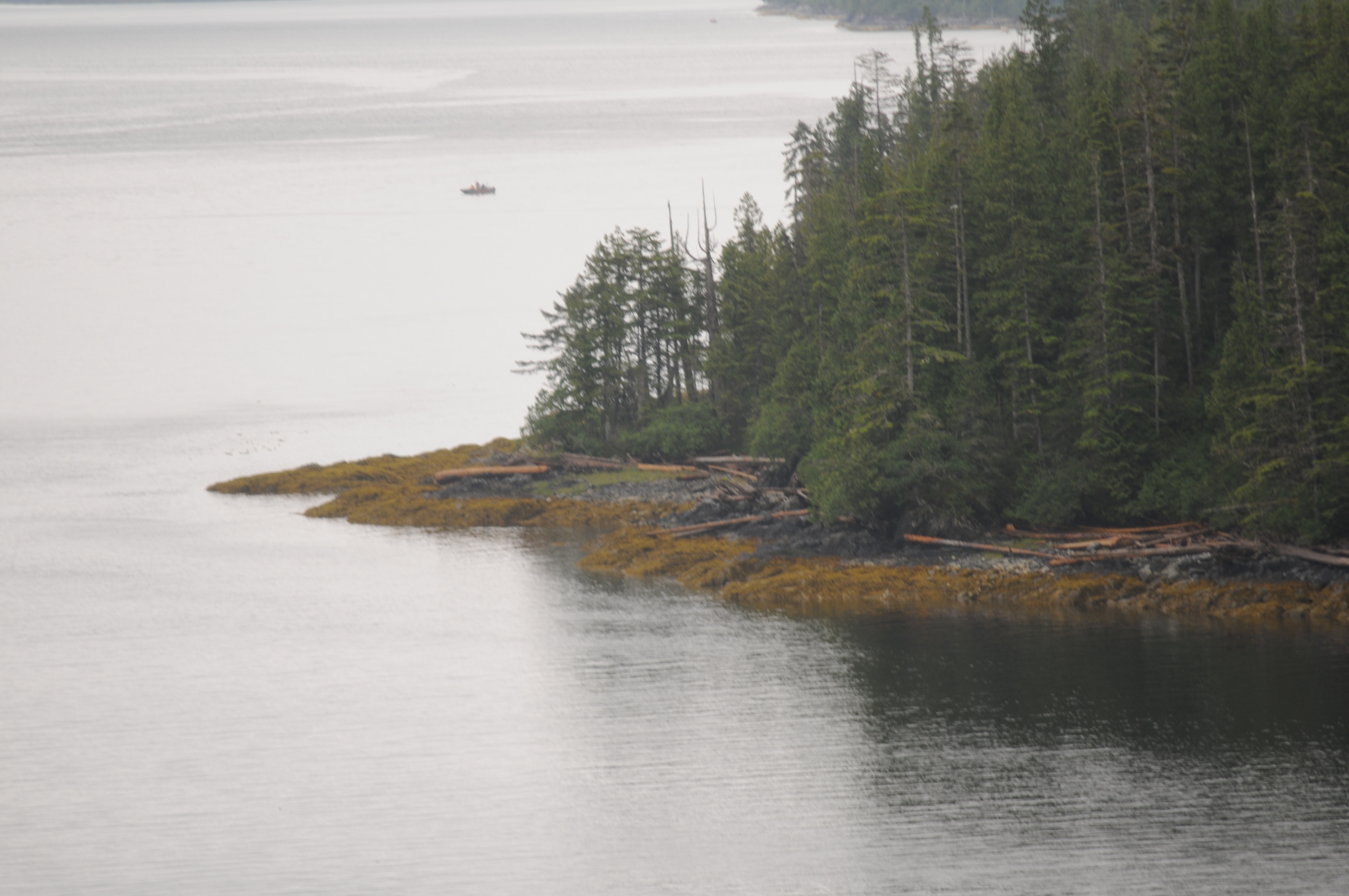
Laredo Sound

Laredo Sound is a sound on the Central Coast of British Columbia, Canada, located on the north side of Price Island. It is connected to Caamaño Sound via Laredo Channel, which runs between Princess Royal Island and Aristazabal Island.

Laredo Sound was named in 1792 by the Spanish naval officer Jacinto Caamaño, commanding the frigate Aranzazu, probably after the port city of Laredo, Spain.

It is the namesake of CCGS Laredo Sound, a SAR vessel operated by the Canadian Coast Guard.
