= Campania Island =

Conservancy in British Columbia, Canada

Coordinates: 53°5′N 129°25′W

Lax Ka’gaas/Campania Conservancy
- IUCN category II (national park)
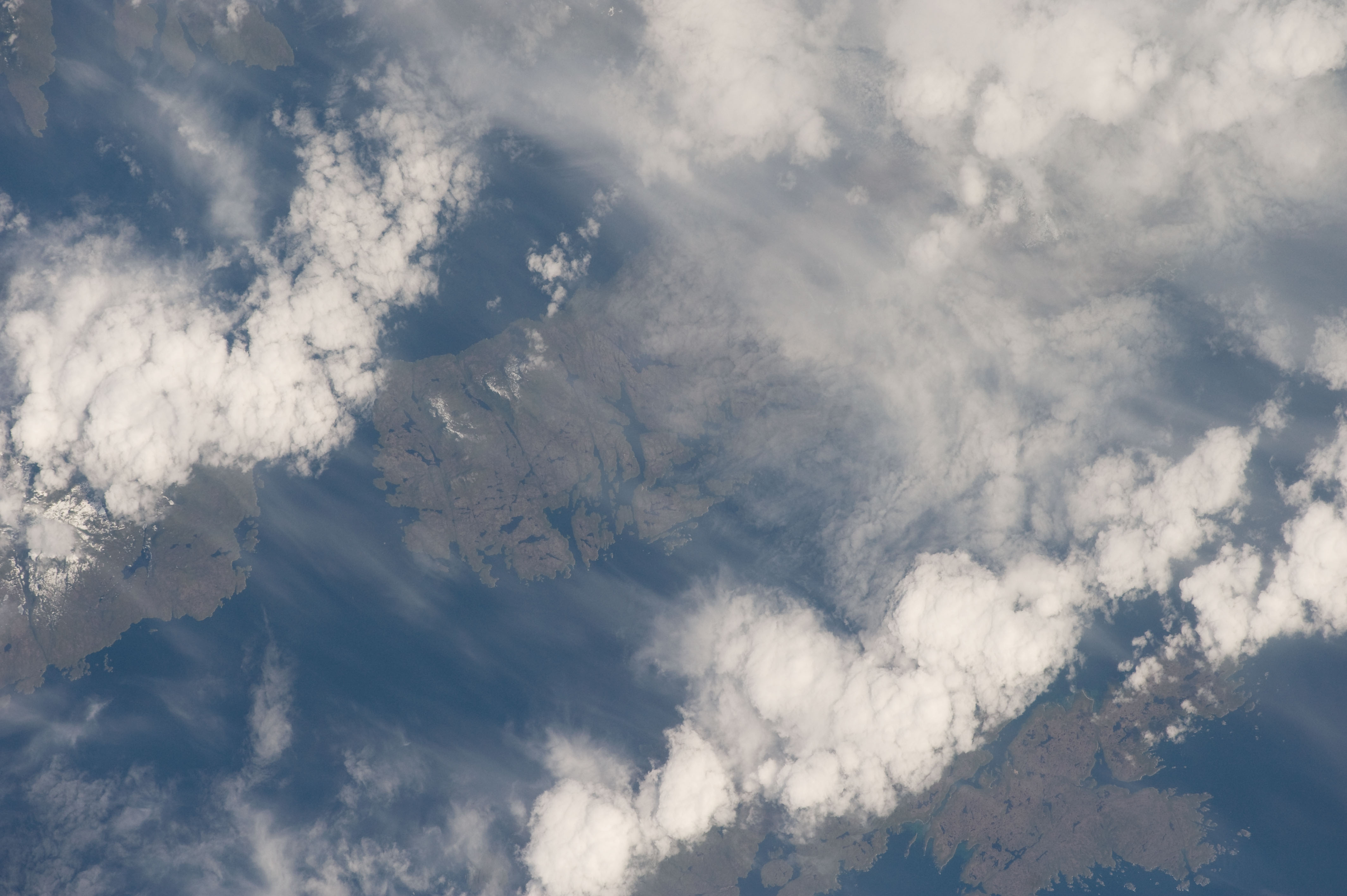
- A view looking east from the International Space Station toward Campania Island (middle) and the Estevan Group (bottom of image)
- Nearest city: Hartley Bay
- Area: 20,504 ha (79.17 sq mi)
- Designation: Conservancy
- Established: July 14, 2006
- Governing body: BC Parks

Campania Island is an island on the coast of the Canadian province of British Columbia. It is located south of Prince Rupert, east across Hecate Strait from Haida Gwaii. To its west, across Estevan Sound, is the Estevan Group archipelago. Banks Island lies to the northwest, across Nepean Sound; and Pitt Island to the north, across Otter Channel. To the northeast, across Squally Channel, is Gil Island, and to the east is Princess Royal Island, across Campania Sound. To the south of Campania Island is Caamaño Sound, beyond which is Aristazabal Island.

Campania Island is 29 kilometres (18 mi) long and ranges in width from 3 kilometres (1.9 mi) to 5 kilometres (3.1 mi). It is 127 square kilometres (49 sq mi) in area.

The name "Campania" originates from 1792 from the Spanish explorer Jacinto Caamaño, who explored the region in the corvette Aranzazu. Caamaño named the island Compañia and that spelling was used for the maps made by George Vancouver. Over time the spelling was changed to Campania.

The island's high point is Mount Pender, at 740 metres (2,430 ft).

== Lax Ka’gaas/Campania Conservancy ==
Campania Island, including the Alexander Islands to the south, was established as Lax Ka’gaas/Campania Conservancy in 2006. The area is of importance to the Gitga'at and Gitxaala First Nations. The conservancy contains 21 known archaeological sites.
