= Melville Island =

Melville Island may refer to:

- Melville Island (Northern Territory), in the Northern Territory, Australia
- Melville Island (Northwest Territories and Nunavut), in northern Canada
- Melville Island (Nova Scotia), a small peninsula in Halifax Harbour, Nova Scotia, Canada
- Melville Island, a small island in the Discovery Islands near Campbell River, British Columbia, Canada
- Melville Island, a small island near Dundas Island near Prince Rupert, British Columbia, Canada
