= Towereroo =

Hawaiian explorer

Towereroo (c. 1776 – ?) was the first Hawaiian to visit Europe. Leaving the Hawaiian Islands in 1788, he returned on the Vancouver Expedition in 1792. Although during his time the British spelled his name "Toweroo", it would probably be Kualelo with modern Hawaiian language spelling.

== Travels ==
An inhabitant of the island of Molokaʻi, in 1788 Towereroo went aboard the ship Princess Royal under Captain Charles Duncan as translator and passenger. In addition to Duncan, he befriended her chief mate (and later commander) James Johnstone and surgeon Archibald Menzies. They voyaged to China where Towereroo was put on Prince of Wales. When they reached England, Johnstone put him in school where, according to Menzies:

"...to the art of Drawing in general he appeared most partial, & would no doubt in a short time make great proficiency with the aid of a little instruction, but in this uncultivated state of his mind he seemed fondest of those rude pictures called Caricatures & frequently amused himself in taking off even his friends in imitation of these pieces."

—

In 1790, Towereroo accompanied Captain Duncan in an exploration of Hudson Bay. When they returned to England, Menzies' patron Sir Joseph Banks announced hopes that Towereroo would be helpful to British ships visiting Hawaii. In 1791 he was put aboard HMS Discovery, along with Menzies and Johnstone. He assisted Menzies in exploring ashore and botanizing at Tenerife on the Canary Islands and, probably, elsewhere, making him probably the first Hawaiian to visit South Africa, Australia and New Zealand.

When the expedition reached Tahiti, Towereroo decided he preferred to stay and marry a local girl. However, the Lords of the Admiralty had directed Vancouver to return him to Hawaii, and Towereroo's wishes were not considered. The local chief, Pōmare (spelled "Pomarrey" at the time), protected Towereroo for a few days, but after "...much investigation, and some coercion..." returned the young adult to the British.

== Return ==
In March 1792, the expedition reached Hawaii, where it was discovered that Towereroo's home island of Molokaʻi was enduring a famine. He was therefore left at Kawaihae with High Chief Kaʻiana and a few presents, which the chief promptly took. Later visitors, such as Frances Barkley of the Halcyon, noted his perfect English and use of the English name "Charles". According to then-Lieutenant Peter Puget, English explorers found Towereroo "of infinite use in the management of the Natives."

According to Archibald Menzies' journal entries, by being useful to Kamehameha I, Towereroo had gained a plantation and he gained another by marrying a chief's daughter; ultimately he controlled around 200 "vassals". In what Menzies perceived as the rough-and-tumble of Hawaiian politics, Towereroo's rapid rise and close relation with the British Empire were both assets and sources of jealousy; at least once Vancouver had to intercede for his life.

Little is recorded of Towereroo's eventual fate, who at that time was almost certainly the furthest-travelled of Hawaiians.
