= Range 4 Coast Land District =

Land district in British Columbia, Canada

Coordinates: 53°29′59″N 127°0′0″W

Range 4 Coast Land District is one of the 59 land districts of British Columbia, Canada, which are part of the cadastral divisions of British Columbia.

== Islands ==
- Barnard Island
- Browning Island
- Dewdney Island
- Estevan Group
- Gribbell Island
- Kitkatla Islands
- Lotbinière Island
- Man Island
- Prior Island
- Trutch Island

== Lakes ==
- Bear Lake]]
- Cory Lake]]
- Ecstall Lake
- Eakin Lake
- Finger Lake
- Frank Lake
- Kluskus Lakes
- Kooryet Lake
- Holmes Lake
- Lower Lake
- Morgan Lake
- Salter Lake
- Warin Lake

canmaps.com

== Settlements ==
- Kitamaat Village
- Southbank
