= Zayas Island =

Island in British Columbia, Canada

Coordinates: 54°36′N 131°3′W

Zayas Island (French: île Zayas) is an island on the North Coast of British Columbia, Canada, located in the east side of Dixon Entrance to the west of Dundas Island. Three parcels of land on the north, east and south shores of the island are reserves of the Lax Kw'alaams First Nation.

== History ==
Captain Frederick C. Learmonth of HMS Egeria, who surveyed the island in 1908, named three points (Jacinto Point, Caamaño Point, and Aranzazu Point) after the Spanish explorer who discovered this island, Jacinto Caamaño, and his recorded journey.

== Etymology ==
The island is named after the second pilot of Jacinto Caamaño, Juan Zayas, during the 1792 voyage of the Pacific Northwest led by the Spanish Empire.
