= Caamaño Passage =

Strait in British Columbia, Canada

Coordinates: 54°35′00″N 131°00′00″W

Caamaño Passage (French: passage Caamaño) is a strait on the North Coast of British Columbia, Canada, located between Dundas and Zayas Islands on the west side of Chatham Sound near Prince Rupert.

It was named after Jacinto Caamaño, commander of the Spanish exploration ship Aranzazu which had been on the coast in question in 1792. Captain Frederick C. Learmonth of HMS Egeria who surveyed the Zayas Island officially named the strait Caamaño Passage.

== See also ==
- Caamaño Sound, another body of water in British Columbia that is named for Jacinto Caamaño
