= Bonilla Island, British Columbia =

Island in British Columbia, Canada

Bonilla Island is a small, remote island in the Hecate Strait west of Banks Island. It has a lighthouse, upland bogs and coastal rainforests. The island is encompassed by the Lax Kul Nii Luutiksm/Bonilla Conservancy which was established in 2006.

== History ==
The first colonial explorer to sail past the inhabited island was likely the island Spanish explorer Jacinto Caamaño, who apparently bestowed the name "Bonilla Island." In 1912, plans to build a light beacon were made, and it was constructed in 1927. Due to increases in marine traffic, a lighthouse, three dwellings, and a fog horn were built in 1957.

== Oceanographic research ==
The Bonilla Island light is one of 27 staffed lighthouses, part of the British Columbia Shore Station Oceanographic Program, collecting coastal water temperature and salinity measurements for the Department of Fisheries and Oceans since 1960.

== Climate ==
Bonilla Island has a rainy and mild Oceanic climate (Köppen: Cfb; Trewartha: Dolk).

Climate data for Bonilla Island WMO ID: 71484; coordinates 53°29′34.259″N 130°38′20.400″W; elevation: 12.5 m (41 ft); 1991–2020 normals, extremes 1965–present
Month	Jan	Feb	Mar	Apr	May	Jun	Jul	Aug	Sep	Oct	Nov	Dec	Year
Record high humidex	14.8	16.7	18.0	19.6	21.7	23.3	22.3	23.7	20.0	19.9	24.4	12.7	24.4
Record high °C (°F)	18.5 (65.3)	16.0 (60.8)	18.0 (64.4)	24.0 (75.2)	24.0 (75.2)	28.5 (83.3)	23.3 (73.9)	22.0 (71.6)	26.5 (79.7)	18.5 (65.3)	18.9 (66.0)	15.0 (59.0)	28.5 (83.3)
Mean daily maximum °C (°F)	6.8 (44.2)	7.1 (44.8)	7.7 (45.9)	9.8 (49.6)	12.0 (53.6)	14.1 (57.4)	15.7 (60.3)	16.2 (61.2)	14.8 (58.6)	11.9 (53.4)	8.9 (48.0)	7.0 (44.6)	11.0 (51.8)
Daily mean °C (°F)	5.0 (41.0)	5.1 (41.2)	5.5 (41.9)	7.6 (45.7)	9.8 (49.6)	12.0 (53.6)	13.6 (56.5)	14.2 (57.6)	12.9 (55.2)	10.1 (50.2)	7.1 (44.8)	5.2 (41.4)	9.0 (48.2)
Mean daily minimum °C (°F)	3.1 (37.6)	3.1 (37.6)	3.3 (37.9)	5.3 (41.5)	7.6 (45.7)	9.8 (49.6)	11.5 (52.7)	12.1 (53.8)	10.9 (51.6)	8.2 (46.8)	5.2 (41.4)	3.4 (38.1)	7.0 (44.6)
Record low °C (°F)	−15.5 (4.1)	−14.5 (5.9)	−11.5 (11.3)	−2.8 (27.0)	2.0 (35.6)	5.5 (41.9)	7.5 (45.5)	7.2 (45.0)	4.4 (39.9)	−5.0 (23.0)	−18.5 (−1.3)	−15.0 (5.0)	−18.5 (−1.3)
Record low wind chill	−21.8	−20.6	−17.6	−4.4	0.0	0.0	0.0	0.0	0.0	−5.7	−16.1	−19.2	−21.8
Average precipitation mm (inches)	229.7 (9.04)	178.8 (7.04)	187.4 (7.38)	155.7 (6.13)	111.1 (4.37)	100.7 (3.96)	93.0 (3.66)	121.6 (4.79)	171.4 (6.75)	239.9 (9.44)	265.5 (10.45)	288.4 (11.35)	2,143.3 (84.38)
Average rainfall mm (inches)	221.3 (8.71)	171.8 (6.76)	182.6 (7.19)	153.7 (6.05)	111.1 (4.37)	100.7 (3.96)	93.0 (3.66)	121.6 (4.79)	171.4 (6.75)	239.8 (9.44)	264.0 (10.39)	281.8 (11.09)	2,112.9 (83.19)
Average snowfall cm (inches)	8.3 (3.3)	7.0 (2.8)	6.5 (2.6)	0.2 (0.1)	0.0 (0.0)	0.0 (0.0)	0.0 (0.0)	0.0 (0.0)	0.0 (0.0)	0.1 (0.0)	1.5 (0.6)	6.7 (2.6)	30.2 (11.9)
Average precipitation days (≥ 0.2 mm)	23.9	20.1	23.2	20.8	17.5	17.2	17.8	18.1	20.6	24.3	24.9	24.8	253.3
Average rainy days (≥ 0.2 mm)	22.7	19.4	22.4	20.7	17.5	17.2	17.8	18.1	20.6	24.3	24.7	24.2	249.7
Average snowy days (≥ 0.2 cm)	2.3	1.9	2.1	0.21	0.0	0.0	0.0	0.0	0.0	0.08	0.73	2.3	9.6
Source: Environment and Climate Change Canada Canadian Climate Normals 1991–2020
