= Kingcome Point =

Headland on Princess Royal Island, Canada

Coordinates: 53°17′57″N 128°54′34″W

Kingcome Point is a headland on the northwest tip of Princess Royal Island in the North Coast region of British Columbia, Canada.

== Name origin ==
The point was named about 1867 by Captain Pender, RN, for William Kingcome, who captained the Hudson's Bay Company barque Princess Royal in 1862–63. Kingcome was the nephew of Admiral John Kingcome, commander of the Royal Navy's Pacific Station from 1863 to 1864, for whom the various Kingcome placenames around and including Kingcome Inlet were named. Another point on Princess Royal Island, Trivett Point, the island's northernmost tip, was named for the previous captain of the Princess Royal, J.T. Trivett, who captained the vessel in 1859-1861 when William Kingcome as its first master.

== See also ==
- Kingcome (disambiguation)
