= Trivett Point =

Coordinates: 53°18′29″N 129°02′12″W

Trivett Point is a headland at the northern tip of Princess Royal Island in the North Coast region of British Columbia, Canada.

== Name origin ==
The point, and nearby Kingcome Point to its east, was named about 1867 by Captain Pender, RN, for J.T. Trivett, who captained the Hudson's Bay Company barque Princess Royal in 1859–1861.
