= Canoona River =

Coordinates: 53°04′00″N 128°34′00″W

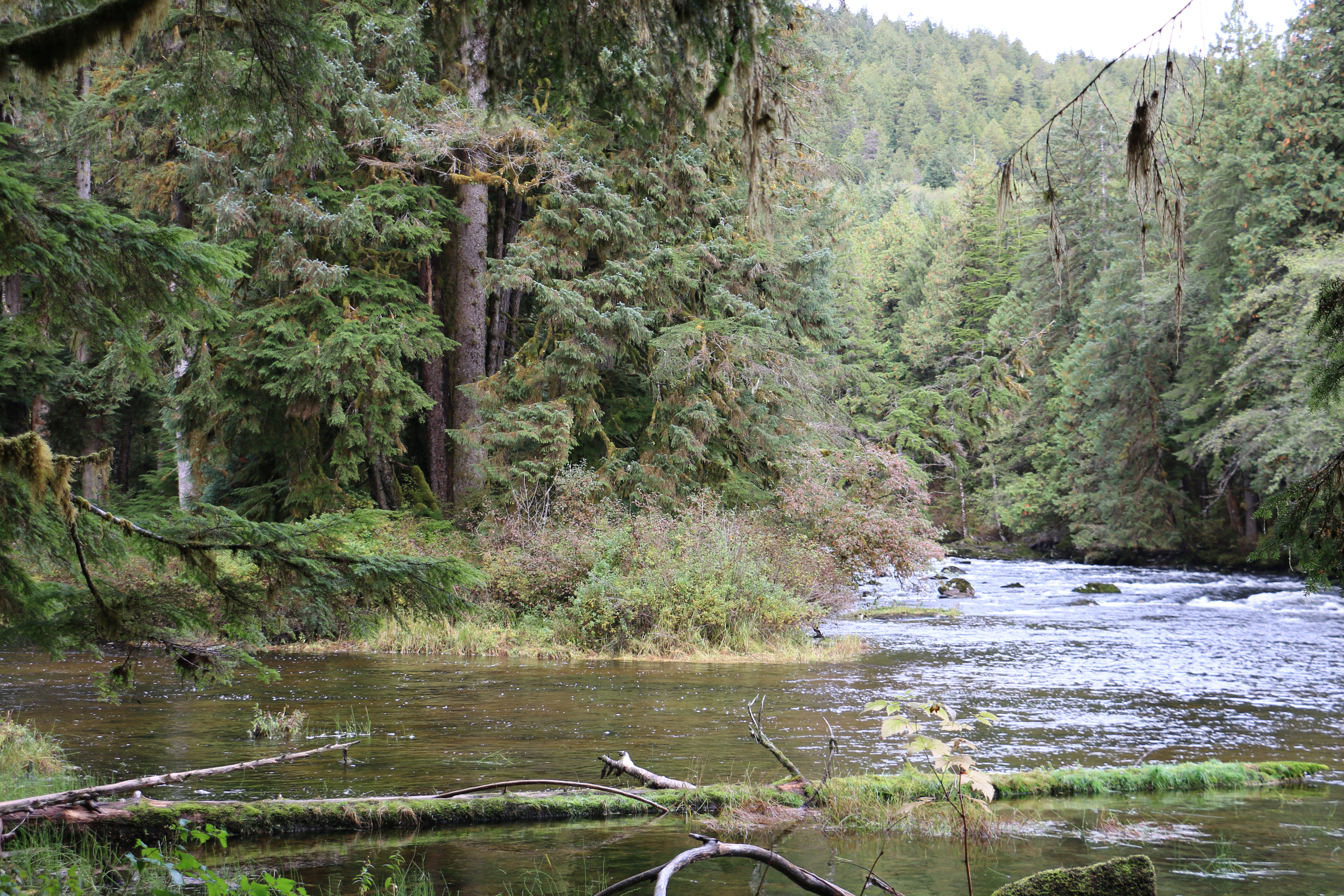
Canoona River, near its mouth

The Canoona River is located on Princess Royal Island on the Inside Passage of British Columbia. The river spills into the ocean over a series of rapids from Canoona Lake. Fish ladders have been built on both sides of the rapids to help the salmon population return to their spawning areas upstream. The abundance of salmon make the Canoona River a popular place for the rare white Kermode bear, which is a sub-species of the black bear.

== See also ==
- List of rivers of British Columbia
