= Camano =

Camano may refer to:

- Camano Island, located in the U.S. state of Washington
- Camano, Uruguay
- Camano, American steamboat built in 1906 which sank in 1917
- Camano-class cargo ship, a design of ship constructed for the U.S. Army towards the end of World War II.

== See also ==
- Camaño
- Kamano Island, British Columbia, Canada
