= Trutch Island =

Island in British Columbia, Canada

Coordinates: 53°06′00″N 129°41′00″W

Trutch Island is an island on the North Coast of British Columbia, Canada. It is one of the northernmost of the Estevan Group of islands and like other islands in the group was named for a Lieutenant-Governor of British Columbia, in this case Joseph Trutch, who had also been Commissioner of Public works and had held other positions in the colonial governments.
