= Laredo (surname) =

Laredo is a surname. Notable people with the surname include:

- Federico Laredo Brú (1875–1946), attorney and President of Cuba
- Ruth Laredo (1937–2005), American pianist
- Jaime Laredo (born 1941), Bolivian violinist and conductor
- Victor Laredo (1910–2003), American documentary filmmaker
