= Streets of Laredo =

Streets of Laredo may refer to:

- "Streets of Laredo" (song), a folk music standard
- Streets of Laredo (novel), a western novel by Larry McMurtry
- The Streets of Laredo, unfinished 1948 western film directed by Ed Wood (completed and released posthumously as Crossroads of Laredo in 1995)
- Streets of Laredo (film), a 1949 western starring William Holden
- "The Streets of Laredo", 1961 short story by Will Henry
- Streets of Laredo (miniseries), a 1995 TV adaptation of the novel, starring James Garner
- "Streets of Laredo", a four-part storyline in the 2001 The Punisher comic book series
- "The Streets of Laredo" (poem), a poem by Louis Macneice
- Streets of Laredo (band), a folk-pop band of New Zealand origin based in the United States
