= 1950 British Columbia B-36 crash =

USAAF crash and loss of nuclear bomb

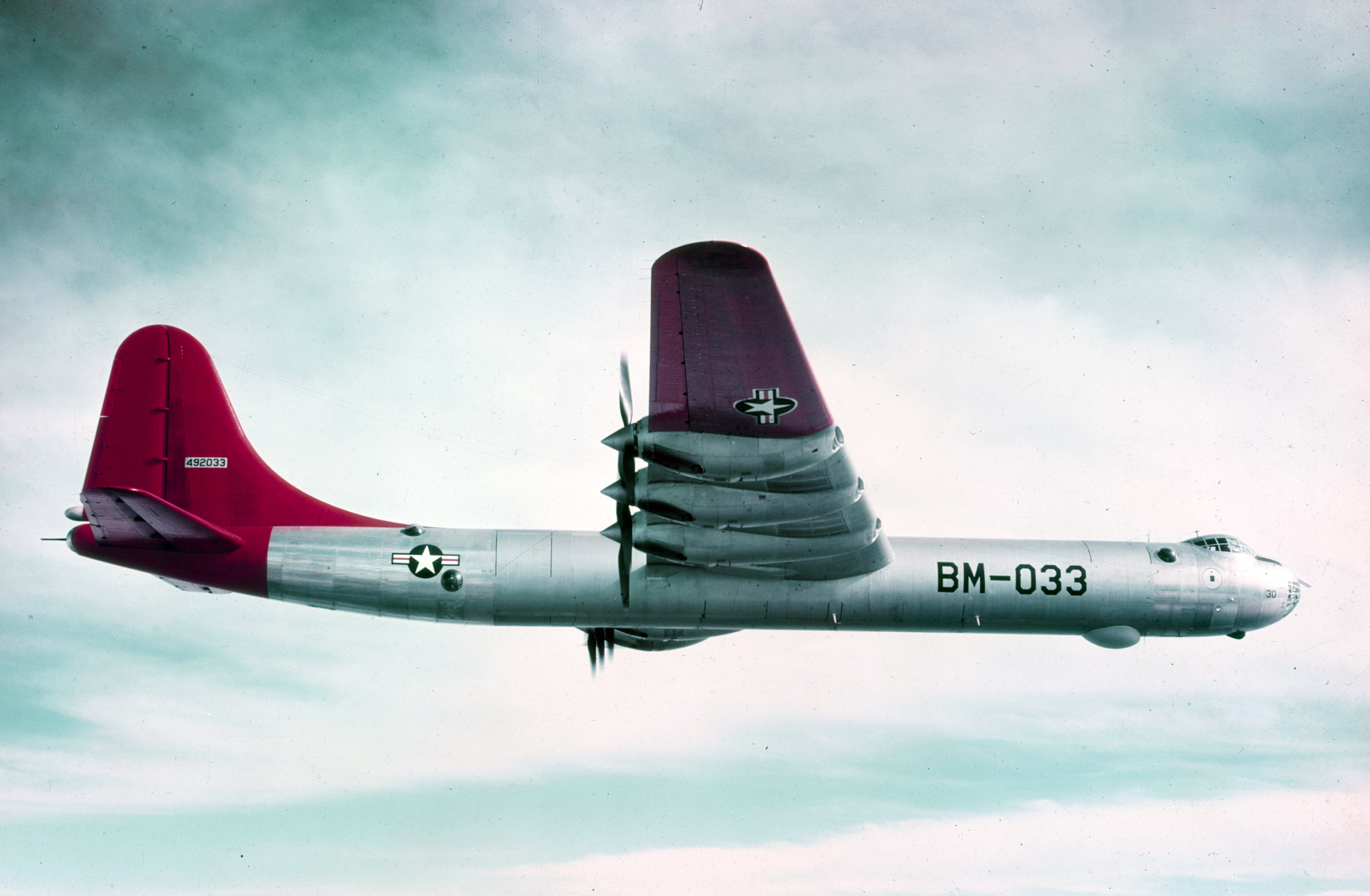
- A Convair B-36B from the same 7th Bombardment Wing as the USAF plane involved in the accident.

Accident
- Date: 13-14 February 1950
- Summary: Engine failure
- Site: Mount Kologet, British Columbia, Canada; 56°1′27.61″N 128°37′11.91″W

Aircraft
- Aircraft type: Convair B-36B
- Operator: United States Air Force
- Registration: 44-92075
- Flight origin: Eielson Air Force Base near Fairbanks, Alaska, United States
- Destination: Carswell Air Force Base in Fort Worth, Texas
- Occupants: 17
- Passengers: 1
- Crew: 16
- Fatalities: 5
- Survivors: 12

Sometime after midnight on 14 February 1950, a Convair B-36B, United States Air Force Serial Number 44-92075 assigned to the US 7th Bombardment Wing, Heavy at Carswell Air Force Base in Texas, crashed in northwestern British Columbia on Mount Kologet after jettisoning a Mark 4 nuclear bomb. This was the first such nuclear weapon loss in history. The B-36B had been en route from Eielson Air Force Base near Fairbanks, Alaska, to Carswell AFB, more than 3,000 miles (4,800 km) southeast, on a mission that included a simulated nuclear attack on San Francisco.

== Incident ==
Convair B-36B 44-92075 was flying on a simulated nuclear strike combat mission by the Soviet Union. The B-36 took off on 13 February 1950 from Eielson AFB with a regular crew of 15 plus a Weaponeer and a Bomb Commander. The plan for the 24-hour flight was to fly over the North Pacific, due west of the Alaska panhandle and British Columbia, then head inland over Washington state and Montana. Here the B-36 would climb to 40,000 feet (12,000 m) for a simulated bomb run to southern California and then San Francisco, and it would continue its non-stop flight to Fort Worth, Texas. The flight plan did not include any penetration of Canadian airspace. The aircraft carried a Mark 4 atomic bomb, containing a substantial quantity of natural uranium and 5,000 pounds (2,300 kg) of conventional explosives. The bomb did not contain the plutonium core necessary for a nuclear detonation. Until 1951, the US military had no nuclear cores in its possession, as they were still entirely in the custody of the U.S. Atomic Energy Commission. The flight did contain a "dummy capsule," a simulated container for a nuclear core (filled with lead), which was recovered much later.

Cold weather (−40 °F/−40 °C on the ground at Eielson AFB) adversely affected the aircraft involved in this exercise, and some minor difficulties with 44-92075 were noted before takeoff. Seven hours into the flight, three of the six piston engines began shooting flames and were shut down, and the other three piston engines proved incapable of delivering full power. The subsequent investigation blamed ice buildup in the carburetor air intakes.

The crew decided to abandon the aircraft because it could not stay aloft with three engines out of commission while carrying a heavy payload. The atomic bomb was jettisoned and detonated in mid-air, resulting in a large conventional explosion over the Inside Passage. The USAF later stated that the fake practice core on board the aircraft was inserted into the weapon before it was dropped.

The aircraft was in regular radio contact with Strategic Air Command headquarters at Offutt AFB, Nebraska. The crew bailed out, using parachutes.

Within minutes of the bailout the Royal Canadian Air Force launched Operation Brix to find the missing men. Poor weather hampered search efforts; nevertheless 12 of the 17 men were eventually found alive. One of the five deceased, the weaponeer, was rumored to have been recovered four years later (1954) at the crash site. The remaining four airmen were believed to have bailed out of the aircraft earlier than the surviving crew members, and it was assumed that they landed in the ocean and died of hypothermia. Canadian authorities were never told that the aircraft was carrying a nuclear weapon.

== Subsequent events ==
To search for the B-36, aircraft were pulled off the search for a Douglas C-54 that had disappeared three weeks earlier. A more exhaustive search was not launched for the B-36, as it was believed to be at the bottom of the Pacific. Three years later, an RCAF flight searching for the missing de Havilland Dove aircraft of Texas millionaire oilman Ellis A. Hall spotted the B-36's wreckage. It was found on the side of Mount Kologet, about 50 miles (80 km) east of the Alaskan border, roughly due east of the towns of Stewart, British Columbia, and Hyder, Alaska, on the east side of the isolated Nass Basin northwest of Hazelton, British Columbia.

The USAF immediately began an investigation. A team was sent in September 1953, as the effort was given a high priority, but they failed to reach the site after 19 days of trudging through the wilderness. The effort was resumed the following year with better equipment, and in August 1954 a new team of USAF personnel accompanied by a local guide reached the wreckage. They recovered important components and then used explosives to destroy what was visible above the snow.

In 1956, two civilian surveyors chanced on the wreck and noted its exact location, which otherwise remained unknown for the next 40 years. In 1997 one of the surveyors provided the coordinates to two distinct expeditions, one American and one led by the Canadian Department of National Defence, seeking to conduct an environmental analysis of the site. Both expeditions reached the wreck around the same time, and members were apparently the first humans to set foot in the area since 1956. The Canadian-led mission found no unusual radiation levels. In late 1998, the Canadian government declared the site protected. A portion of one of the gun turrets is on display at The Bulkley Valley Museum in Smithers, British Columbia.

In late October 2016 a diver reported he had discovered something looking like a segment of the partially disarmed Mark IV nuclear bomb which the co-pilot said had been dumped before the crash. The location near Pitt Island in the Inside Passage was mistakenly reported as off Haida Gwaii. The Royal Canadian Navy later confirmed that the item was not the Mark IV bomb.

== See also ==
- List of military nuclear accidents
- Nuclear weapons of the United States

== Sources ==
- "Broken Arrow," Dirk Septer. BC Aviator 3, no. 2 (October–November 1993): 23–27 .
- Site with links to Canadian Dept. of National Defence report and to news stories.
- Convair B-36 Crash Reports and Wreck Sites with pictures of the crash site.
- Transcript of an interview with a crew survivor.
- 2004 Canadian documentary film about the incident.
- "Broken Arrow – The Declassified History of U.S. Nuclear Weapons Accidents" by Michael H. Maggelet and James C. Oskins ISBN 978-1-4357-0361-2.
