= Francisco Caamaño Rojas =

Chilean politician

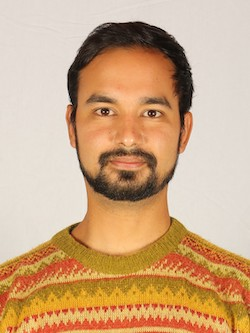

Member of the Constitutional Convention
- In office 4 July 2021 – 4 July 2022
- Constituency: 14th District

Personal details
- Born: 11 December 1989 (age 36) Santiago, Chile
- Other political affiliations: The List of the People (2021–2022)
- Parent(s): Carlos Caamaño; Andrea Rojas
- Education: Duoc UC (B.Sc)
- Occupation: Political activist
- Profession: Business management

Francisco Caamaño Rojas (born 11 December 1989) is a Chilean business administration engineer and independent politician.

He served as a member of the Constitutional Convention, representing the 14th electoral district of the Metropolitan Region. He was appointed deputy vice president of the Convention in May 2022.

== Biography ==
Caamaño Rojas was born on 11 December 1989 in the city of Molina, Maule Region. He is the son of Carlos Arturo Caamaño Moya and Andrea Antonia Rojas Núñez.

He completed his primary education at Escuela Santa María in El Monte and his secondary education at Liceo Comercial Talagante, graduating in 2007. He pursued higher education at DUOC UC, where he obtained a degree in Business Administration Engineering.

Professionally, he has worked as an administrative assistant at the Department of Geophysics of the University of Chile.

== Political career ==
Caamaño Rojas is an independent politician. Since 2015, he has been active as an environmental activist and science communicator. He has participated in environmental organizations such as Verde Nativo, Plantemos Nativo, and Humedales del Mapocho, and has supported various rural and cultural organizations.

In the elections held on 15–16 May 2021, he ran as an independent candidate for the 14th electoral district of the Metropolitan Region as part of the La Lista del Pueblo electoral pact. He received 26,825 votes, corresponding to 8.85% of the validly cast votes.

In May 2022, he was confirmed as deputy vice president of the Constitutional Convention, replacing Giovanna Grandón.
