= Charles Duncan (captain) =

British ship captain

Charles Duncan was a British ship captain engaged in the maritime fur trade and related exploration in the late 1780s. From 1786 to 1788 he was captain of Princess Royal, the tender for Prince of Wales, under James Colnett, both vessels owned by the King George's Sound Company. Colnett and Duncan acquired sea otter furs by trade with the indigenous peoples of the Pacific Northwest Coast, then sold them in Guangzhou (Canton), sailing there via the Hawaiian Islands.

While on the coast of present-day British Columbia Duncan and Colnett had a series of first contact encounters with some of the Kitkatla Tsimshian. In Hawaii Princess Royal and Prince of Wales were involved in several violent conflicts with the islanders; one conflict at Waimea Bay, resulted in the death of between five and fourteen Hawaiians.

Duncan sketched a map of the entrance to the Juan de Fuca Strait with notes on the Makah of Cape Claaset (now Cape Flattery, Washington), and a drawing of Pinnacle Rock (now Fuca’s Pillar, Washington). He believed a Northwest Passage existed but failed to locate one. His beliefs were based on communications with indigenous people.

In 1788 Duncan named Princess Royal Island after his ship Princess Royal.
