= Swan Lake Kispiox River Provincial Park =

Provincial park in British Columbia

- IUCN category Ib (wilderness area)
- Location within British Columbia
- Interactive map of Swan Lake Kispiox River Provincial Park
- Location: Kitimat-Stikine, British Columbia, Canada
- Coordinates: 55°54′00″N 128°35′00″W
- Area: 62,255 ha (240.37 sq mi)
- Established: April 30, 1996
- Governing body: BC Parks

Swan Lake Kispiox River Provincial Park is a provincial park in northwest British Columbia, Canada. It lies within the territories of the Gitanyow and Gitxsan First Nations. The park and the area surrounding it are important to First Nations people for cultural activities. There are trumpeter swans known to be on Club Creek in the winter.

In 1950, a B-36 crashed in the park after jettisoning a nuclear bomb.
