= Melitón Camaño =

Argentine journalist

- Born: 1886
- Died: 1931

Melitón Camaño (1868–1931) was an Argentine journalist and politician.

== Biography ==
Camaño was born on the 8th of August 1868 in Santiago del Estero. He lost his father when he was very young, and his family moved to Tucumán, where he lived ever since. He studied at the Escuela Normal (normal school) de San Miguel de Tucumán and then the Colegio Nacional (national college). During the time he studied there, he also served as librarian.

He graduated in 1895 from the Facultad de Derecho de Buenos Aires.
