= Carcamano =

Ethnic slur used in Brazil

Carcamano (Portuguese pronunciation: [ˌkaɾkaˈmɐ̃nu]; in Caipira dialect: [kaɹkaˈmɐ̃no]) is an ethnic slur used in São Paulo and in the South of Brazil for the Italian immigrants who arrived in Brazil in the late 19th century and in the early 20th century.

In some regions of Northeastern Brazil (especially the states of Maranhão and Ceará), this term is also used for Brazilian Jews and Arab Brazilians.

Folk etymology wrongly advocates that the word carcamano is composed of two separate words. Calca- drawn from the Italian verb calcare, which means "to press down" and -mano (IT) meaning "hand". The idea was to refer to the foreigner, probably of Italian origin (whence mano, vs. Portuguese mão), of pressing down on the scales when weighing goods in the dry goods or grocery store. It is a way of calling the vendor a cheat.

The real etymological base of the word is disputed. According to the Brazilian filologist Antenor Nascentes the most probable origin is the Spanish-language word carcamán, used in Latin America to denote "decrepit person" (in Peru), a poor foreigner (in Cuba), pretentious person with few merits (in Colombia) and Italians - in particular Italians from Liguria - (in Argentina).
