= HMS Egeria =

Three Royal Navy ships have been called HMS Egeria:

- The first HMS Egeria (1807) was an 18-gun (later 26-gun) Cormorant-class ship-sloop launched at Bridport in 1807 and broken up in 1864.
- The second HMS Egeria (1873) was a 4-gun Fantome-class screw composite sloop launched at Pembroke in 1873 and sold in 1911.
- The third HMS Egeria (A72) was an Echo-class survey ship, built by William Weatherhead & Sons, Cockenzie, commissioned 1959 and sold in 1985.
