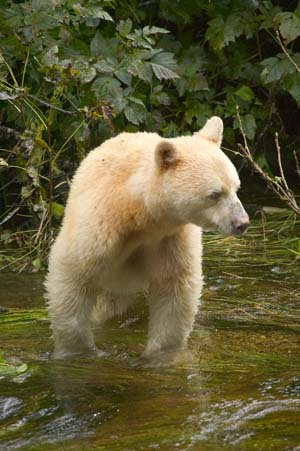

Conservation status
- Apparently Secure (NatureServe)

Scientific classification
- Kingdom: Animalia
- Phylum: Chordata
- Class: Mammalia
- Order: Carnivora
- Family: Ursidae
- Genus: Ursus
- Species: U. americanus
- Subspecies: U. a. kermodei

Trinomial name
- Ursus americanus kermodei Hornaday, 1905

= Spirit bear =

Kermode bear

Subspecies of the American black bear

The spirit bear, sometimes called the Kermode bear (Ursus americanus kermodei), is a subspecies of the American black bear and lives in the Central and North Coast regions of British Columbia, Canada. It is the official provincial mammal of British Columbia and symbol of Terrace, British Columbia. While most Kermode bears are black, between 100 and 500 fully white individuals exist. The white variant is known as spirit bear, and is most common on three islands in British Columbia (Gribbell, Princess Royal, and Roderick), where they make up 10–20% of the Kermode population. Spirit bears hold a prominent place in the oral traditions of the indigenous peoples of the area. They have also been featured in a National Geographic documentary and in the BBC TV series Planet Earth III.

== Description ==
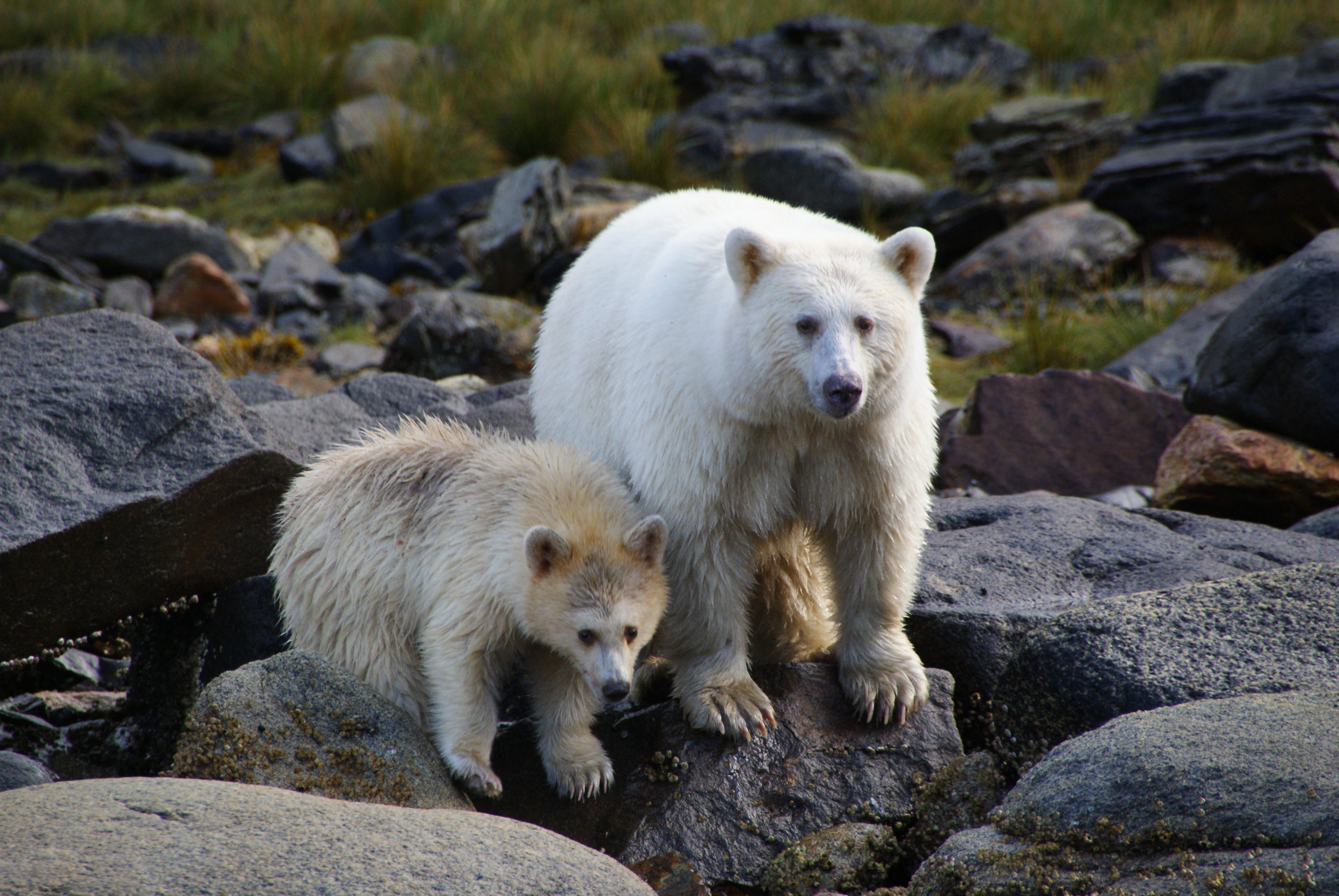
At the Spirit Bear Lodge, Klemtu, British Columbia

The Kermode bear was named after Frank Kermode, former director of the Royal B.C. Museum, who researched the subspecies and was a colleague of William Hornaday, the zoologist who described it. Today, the name Kermode is pronounced as /kərˈmoʊdi/ kər-MOH-dee differing from the pronunciation of the Kermode surname, which originates on the Isle of Man (/ˈkɜːrmoʊd/ KUR-mohd).

White Kermode bears are not albinos, as they still have pigmented skin and eyes. Rather, a single, nonsynonymous nucleotide substitution in the MC1R gene causes melanin to not be produced. This mutant gene is recessive, so Kermode bears with two copies of this mutant, nonfunctional gene appear white, while bears with one copy or no copies appear black. Two black bears can mate and produce a white cub if both of these black bears are heterozygous, carrying one copy of the mutant MC1R gene, and both mutant genes are inherited by the cub. Additional genetic studies found that white Kermode bears breed more with white Kermode bears, and black Kermode bears breed more with black Kermode bears, in a phenomenon known as positive assortative mating. One hypothesis is that this happens because young bears imprint on their mother's fur colour.

Kermode bears are omnivorous for most of the year, subsisting mainly on herbage and berries except during autumn salmon migrations, when they become obligate predators. During the day, white bears are 35% more successful than black bears in capturing salmon. Salmon evade large, black models about twice as frequently as they evade large white models, giving white bears an advantage in salmon hunting. The white fur of the bear is harder to spot under water by fish than black fur is, so the bear can catch fish more easily. On some islands, white Kermode bears have more marine-derived nutrients in their fur, indicating that white Kermode bears eat more salmon than the black Kermode bears.

== Habitat ==
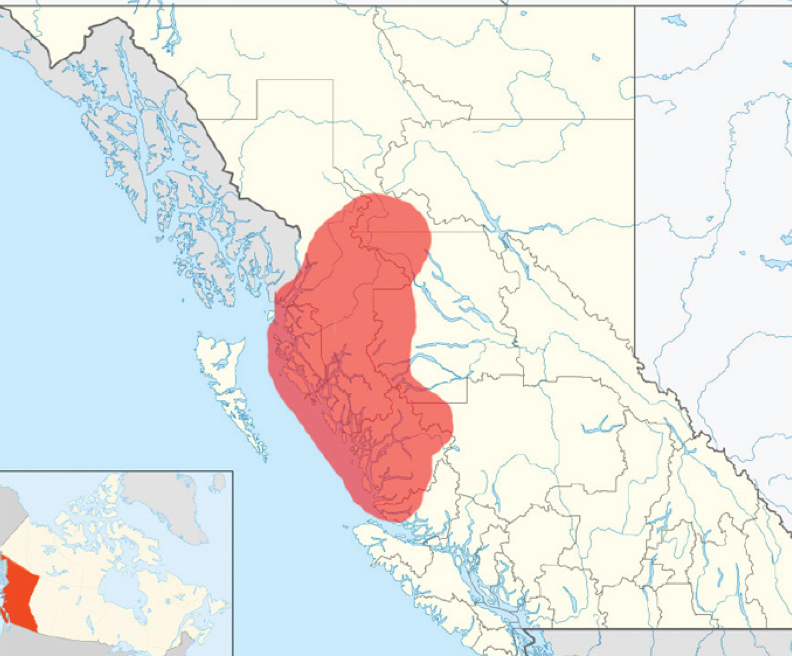
Kermode Bear distribution

The U. a. kermodei subspecies ranges from Princess Royal Island to Prince Rupert, British Columbia, on the coast and inland toward Hazelton, British Columbia. It is known in the Tsimshianic languages as moksgmʼol. In the February 2006 Speech from the Throne, the Lieutenant Governor of British Columbia announced the government's intention to designate the Kermode, or spirit bear, as British Columbia's official animal. It was adopted as such in April of that year. A male Kermode bear can reach 225 kg (496 lb) or more. Females are much smaller, with a maximum weight of 135 kg (298 lb). Straight up, it stands 180 cm (71 in) tall.

Fewer than 400 white-coloured bears were estimated to exist in the coast area that stretches from Southeast Alaska southwards to the northern tip of Vancouver Island; about 120 inhabit the large Princess and Prince Royal Islands. The largest concentration of the white bears inhabits 80-square-mile (210 km^{2}) Gribbell Island, in the territory of the Gitgaʼata people.

The bear's habitat was potentially under threat from the Enbridge Northern Gateway Pipelines, whose planned route would have passed near the Great Bear Rainforest. Indigenous groups including the Gitgaʼat opposed the pipeline. The Enbridge Northern Gateway pipeline was rejected by the federal government in 2016.

== Conservation ==
Although the Kermode bear is not rare, considerable conservation efforts have been made to maintain the subspecies' population due to the bear's cultural significance.

The majority of the Kermode bears' protein intake is from salmon during the fall. Salmon are a keystone species and are important to the nutrient intake of both aqueous and terrestrial environments. The salmon contribute nutrients to water during spawning and contribute to the land with decomposition of their carcasses when predators, such as bears, scatter them throughout the forest.

In 2012, the coastal First Nations banned trophy hunting of all bears in their territories in the Great Bear Rainforest. In 2017, after much public pressure to end the practice, the government of British Columbia banned the trophy hunting of grizzlies in the Great Bear Rainforest, but the hunting of black bears remains legal. A concern in regards to hunting is potential poaching. Grizzly bears also pose a threat to Kermode bear populations because of the decline of natural resources, especially salmon populations that are becoming subject to climate change and overfishing. Using noninvasive hair-line traps scientists tracked the movement of grizzlies across the coasts and rainforest. They found that grizzlies are moving into black bear and Kermode bear salmon feeding grounds more often. This disrupts the feeding of Kermode and other black bears, as they often retreat once grizzlies arrive.

Spirit Bear Lodge is an ecolodge that provides bear sightseeing opportunities, provides education about British Columbia bears, and has stimulated the economy of the Klemtu Indian Reserve. The operators have complained about hunting, stating they have seen bear carcasses, and that hunting makes the bears more wary of humans and harder to spot.

=== In captivity ===
In October 2012, a Kermode bear, believed to be the first in captivity, became a resident of the British Columbia Wildlife Park in Kamloops. The yearling cub was found abandoned in northwestern British Columbia on the side of Terrace Mountain near Terrace. After two unsuccessful attempts to rehabilitate and release him back into the wild, the cub, now nicknamed Clover by handlers, was sent to the park when conservation officers decided that he was not a candidate for relocation. The park has plans to create a custom home for the bear, which escaped from his temporary enclosure once. Animal-rights group Lifeforce believed that the bear was healthy enough to survive on his own and that he should be relocated and released back into the wild. Provincial government wildlife officials maintained their position against attempting a long-distance relocation, stating that the risks outweighed the possible benefits, and as of February 2023, the bear remains in captivity.

== See also ==
- Cinnamon bear, another color variant of the American black bear
- White stag, an animal variant with an important position in folklore and mythology
- White lion
- White panther
- White tiger
