= Jacinto Caamaño =

Spanish explorer (1759–1829)

Jacinto Caamaño Moraleja, OC (September 8, 1759 – November 29, 1829) was a Spanish explorer who was the leader of the last great Spanish exploration of Alaska (then Russian America) and the British Columbia Coast.

== Explorations ==
A few years later, he formed part of a politico-commercial expedition to Constantinople to establish business relations with Turkey, Poland, and Russia. After a quick trip to Cuba in 1787, he was chosen by Juan Francisco de la Bodega y Quadra to go to the Pacific Coast of Mexico and the naval base of San Blas, the headquarters for the exploration of the Pacific Northwest. He was a Frigate Lieutenant (Teniente de Fragata) at the time. Alongside went his brother-in-law, Francisco de Eliza, who would distinguish himself as Governor of Fort San Miguel on Vancouver Island's Nootka Sound. On their ship to Mexico was the recently named Viceroy of New Spain, Don Juan Vicente de Güemes Padilla Horcasitas y Aguayo, 2nd Count of Revillagigedo.

On February 3, 1790, Caamaño took part in an expedition to the Pacific Northwest. He was commanding the Nuestra Señora del Rosario (also known as the La Princesa), a 189-ton frigate built in San Blas for the exploration of the North. He did not go beyond Nootka on this voyage, but on his next one, in 1792, he came as far as Bucareli Bay, commanding the frigate Aránzazu, a corvette built at Cavite in the Philippines. By this time, he had been promoted to Ship Lieutenant (Teniente de Navío). This expedition did a thorough study of the coast from Bucareli to Nootka, marking the map of Alaska and British Columbia with many names which are there today.

Sailing from Nootka on June 13, 1792, Caamaño explored Bucareli Bay, off Prince of Wales Island, Alaska, and anchored in Dixon Entrance on July 20. Then he explored southward, passing through Principe Channel, Nepean Sound, Whale Sound, near the Estevan Group archipelago, then into Caamaño Sound and south through Laredo Channel, between Aristazabal Island and Princess Royal Island, returning to Nootka on September 7, 1792. He named Principe Channel, Laredo Channel, Campania Island, Campania Sound, Aristazabal Island, Gil Island and Gravina Island after Federico Gravina. George Vancouver adopted these names for his chart.

== Later career and family ==
Having successfully completed his trip to Alaska, Caamaño was sent, after a brief stay in San Blas, across the Pacific Ocean to the Philippines. From 1794 to 1807, he served at various posts between Mexico and Peru, having married on one of those trips the Ecuadorian, Francisca de Arteta Santistevan, who gave him eight children. In 1820, he was still living in Guayaquil, the birthplace of his youngest daughter, but nothing is known of the date and place of his death. Some of his descendants, the Caamaño family, have been historically prominent in Ecuador, most notably his grandson, José Plácido Caamaño, who became president of the Republic. Also noted is his great-grandson, Jacinto Jijón y Caamaño, a noted aristocrat, historian and politician; as well as another great-grandson, the poet Ernesto Noboa y Caamaño, among others.

== Legacy ==
Camano Island, an island in Puget Sound, was named to honor Jacinto Caamaño, as was Caamaño Sound, British Columbia, on the northern limit of which there is also Jacinto Island. Other Spanish names in the immediate vicinity of Caamaño Sound are Campania Sound, Estevan Point (named by Juan José Pérez Hernández) and Aristazabal Island. Also named for him are Caamaño Passage northwest of Prince Rupert (between Dundas and Zayas Islands) and Caamano Point on the southern tip of the Cleveland Peninsula (west of Revillagigedo Island in Southeast Alaska).

== See also ==
- List of historical ships in British Columbia
