= Caamaño Sound =

Sound in British Columbia, Canada

Coordinates: 52°54′N 129°15′W

Caamaño Sound (French: détroit Caamaño) is a sound on the coast of the Canadian province of British Columbia. It extends east from Hecate Strait. Princess Royal Island, Rennison Island, and Aristazabal Island lie to the south of the sound. Several islands lie to the north, including Campania Island and the Estevan Group of islands. Caamaño Sound connects with various waterways including Estevan Sound, Campania Sound, Nepean Sound and Laredo Channel.

Caamaño Sound was named in 1908 by Captain Learmonth of HMS Egeria, for Jacinto Caamaño, who explored the region in command of the Spanish corvette Aranzazu.

== See also ==
- Caamaño Passage, another body of water in British Columbia that is named for Jacinto Caamaño
