= Kitkatla, British Columbia =

Kitkatla Lach Klan Lach Klan
- Village
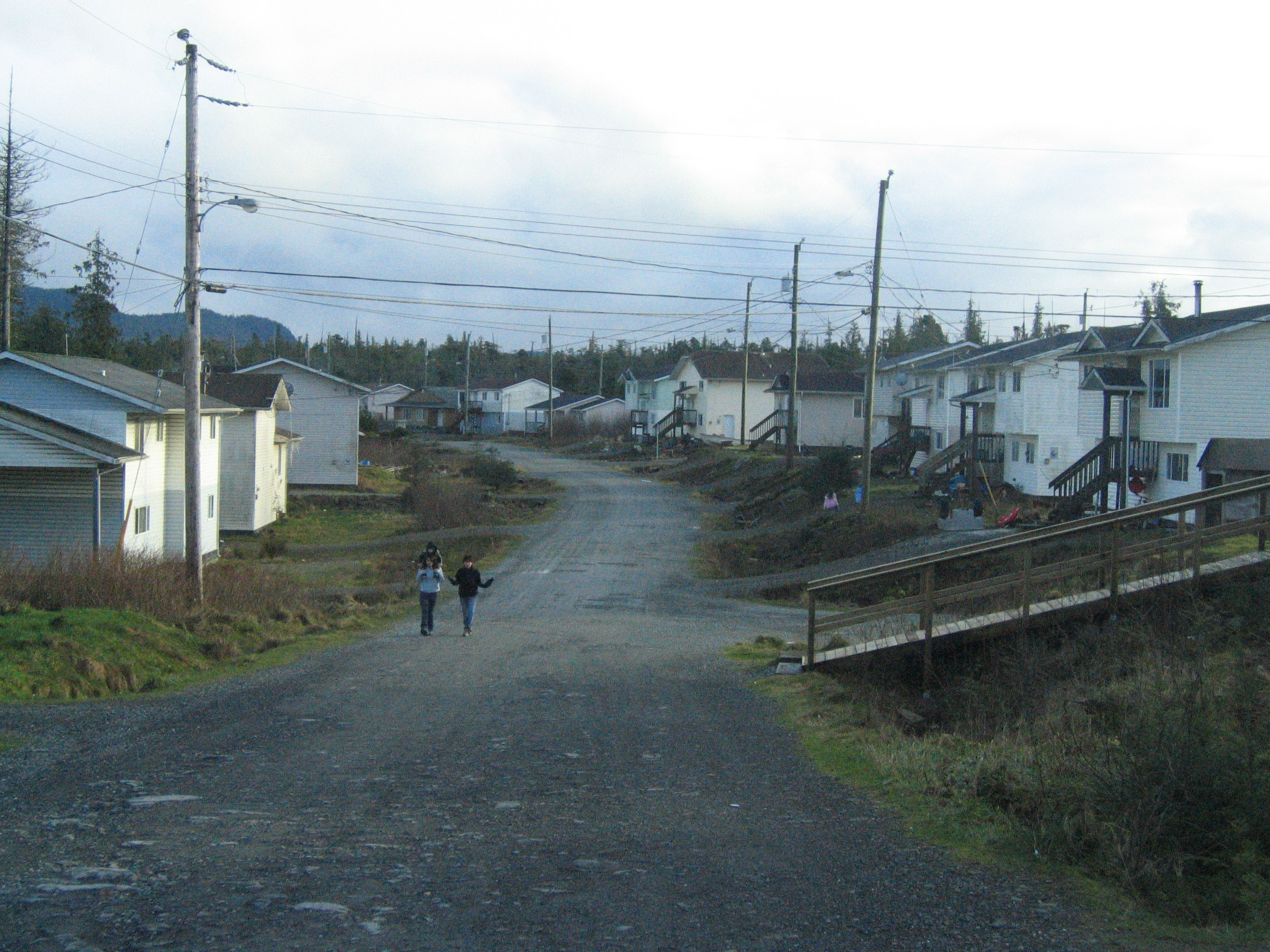

- Location of Kitkatla in British Columbia
- Coordinates: 53°48′00″N 130°26′00″W
- Country: Canada
- Province: British Columbia
- Regional District: North Coast

Population (2016)
  - Total: 114
- (Revised from 68 residents to 114 residents in 2018)
- Area codes: 250, 778

Kitkatla (correctly called Gitxaała) is the name of the people who live in Lax Klan, a small Sm'algyax-speaking village situated approximately 45 km S.W. of Prince Rupert, British Columbia, Canada, on the north side of Dolphin Island. The village is accessible via Prince Rupert by regular float plane flights or by boat. It is home to the Gitxaała people, and the place is called Lax Klan.
