= Dundas Island (British Columbia) =

Island in British Columbia, Canada

Native name: Kwaexl
- Interactive map of Dundas Island

Geography
- Location: Chatham Sound
- Coordinates: 54°33′47″N 130°52′22″W

Administration
- Canada
- Province: British Columbia
- Land District: Range 5 Coast Land District

Additional information
- Time zone: Pacific

Dundas Island (Tsimshian: Kwaexl French: île Dundas) is an island on the North Coast of British Columbia, Canada, at the northern entrance to Chatham Sound, 1.6 km (0.99 mi) south of BC's international border with Alaska. The island is of great cultural significance to area First Nations.

It is the largest of a group of islands known as the Dundas Archipelago, it has high local relief, and an irregular and predominantly rocky coastline. Drainage consists mainly of flat creeks and seasonal streams with gravel streambeds to about 6 m (20 ft) above sea level, which then abruptly descend to the coast.

The Dundas Archipelago are part of the Lax Kwaxl/Dundas and Melville Islands Conservancy. The conservancy was designated in 2008 as part of the North Coast Land and Resource Management Plan. The archipelago has been home to humans for at least eleven thousand years.

The surrounding waters are often rough, especially on the western and northern sides, due to strong tides, currents, and Pacific weather systems. Off the coast is the Grey Islet Automated Weather Station, providing localized weather observations.

== Geology ==
Dundas Island lies within the Alexander Terrane, and is an outcrop of older mafic metavolcanic rocks and metagreywacke from the Paleozoic through Mesozoic, intruded by younger Cretaceous plutons of quartz diorite, diorite, gabbro, and granodiorite. Rocks have been metamorphosed to greenschist facies and displays foliation that dips to the southeast.

== History ==
The island and its archipelago were named in 1792 by Captain George Vancouver in honour of the Rt. Hon. Henry Dundas (1742–1811), Treasurer of the Navy, 1783–1801, who was granted the title of Viscount Melville in 1802 and also named Baron Dunira. The Dundas islands were originally perceived by Vancouver to be one island which he named Dundas's Island. Among the smaller islands of the group are Baron Island, Dunira Island, Melville Island and other small islands and islets on the west side of Chatham Sound between Brown and Caamaño Passages.

Dundas' son, Robert Dundas, 2nd Viscount Melville is the namesake of Melville Island in the Northwest Territories and Nunavut, and also Melville Island in Australia, which was the site of the short-lived Fort Dundas.
