= Campania Sound =

Sound in British Columbia, Canada

Coordinates: 53°00′00″N 129°15′00″W

Campania Sound is a sound on the North Coast of British Columbia, Canada, located between Campania Island and Princess Royal Island. It was named in association with Campania Island.
