= Estevan Group =

Island group in British Columbia, Canada

Coordinates: 53°2′30″N 129°37′30″W

Location of the Estevan Group along the coast of British Columbia, Canada

The Estevan Group, formerly the Estevan Islands, is a small archipelago in the Hecate Strait region of the North Coast of British Columbia, Canada. It is to the west of Campania Island, which is separated from the group by Estevan Sound, and is itself to the west of Gil Island across Squally Channel. Southeast of it and the Estevan Group is Caamaño Sound, beyond which is Aristazabal Island; to the east of all is Princess Royal Island, the fourth largest on the British Columbia Coast. To the northwest of the group is Banks Island.

The group's five largest islands are named after Lieutenant-Governors of British Columbia: Trutch, Barnard, Dewdney, Prior and Lotbinière. Another island, Tennant Island, is in Langley Passage, which runs through the heart of the archipelago on the southwest flank of Trutch Island, and is the site of a provincial nature conservancy and adjacent to an aerodrome at Ethelda Bay on Barnard Island.

Two protected areas intersect the Estevan Group. The Ethelda Bay – Tennant Island Conservancy protects an area in the surroundings of Tennant Island and was established in 2007. The Dewdney and Glide Islands Ecological Reserve, established in 1971 and closed to the public, covers a larger area encompassing Dewdney Island, the Glide Islands, and surrounding smaller islands and islets.
