= Princess Royal Island =

Island in British Columbia, Canada

Princess Royal
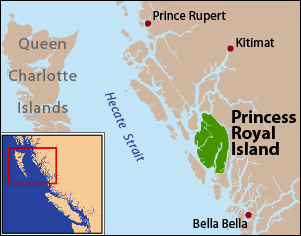
- Princess Royal Island is located on the Inside Passage to the east of Hecate Strait
- Interactive map of Princess Royal

Geography
- Location: North Coast Archipelago (Central Coast)
- Coordinates: 52°57′00″N 128°50′40″W
- Area: 2,294.15 km^{2} (885.78 sq mi) (2026)
- Area rank: 33rd in Canada & 189th worldwide

Administration
- Canada
- Province: British Columbia
- Region: North Coast

Demographics
- Ethnic groups: Tsimshian territory

Princess Royal Island is the largest island on the North Coast of British Columbia, Canada. It is located amongst the isolated inlets and islands east of Hecate Strait on the British Columbia Coast. At 2,294.1 km^{2} (885.8 sq mi), it is the fourth largest island in British Columbia, the 33rd in Canada and 189th worldwide. It was named in 1788 by Captain Charles Duncan, after his ship Princess Royal.

== Access and settlements ==
The island is located in an extremely remote area of British Columbia, 520 km (320 mi) north of Vancouver and 200 km (120 mi) south of Prince Rupert. It is accessible only by boat or air. The Inside Passage ferry and shipping lane runs along its eastern flank, in Princess Royal Channel separating it from the mainland. The island is uninhabited, but used to be home to the community of Surf Inlet, a gold-mining town at the inlet of the same name (though also known as Port Belmont or Belmont), and Butedale, a mining, cannery, fishing and logging town on the island's east coast. The nearest communities today are Klemtu, on Swindle Island and Hartley Bay, on the mainland shore east of Gil Island.

== Indian reserves ==
Indian reserves on, or adjacent to Princess Royal Island are: Gitgaʼat First Nation reserves:

- Kahas Indian Reserve No. 7, on the west coast of Princess Royal at Barnard Harbour, 16.5 ha (41 acres) at 53°04′00″N 129°07′00″W.
- Kayel Indian Reserve No. 8, on the west shore of Princess Royal fronting on Campania Sound, 1.6 ha (4.0 acres) at 53°04′00″N 129°10′00″W.
- Lackzuswadda Indian Reserve No. 9, on an island at the entrance to Surf Inlet, on the southwest coast of Princess Royal, 2.2 ha (5.4 acres) at 52°54′00″N 129°09′00″W.

Kitasoo/Xaixais First Nation reserves:

- Canoona 2, on Princess Royal Island, north shore of Graham Reach,219.3 ha (542 acres).
- Dil-ma-sow 5, on Kent Islet southwest of the Princess Royal Islands, 1.9 ha (4.7 acres).
- Kinmakanksk 6, on the southwest shore of Princess Royal Island on Laredo Channel, 11.7 ha (29 acres).
- Lattkaloup 9, on Princess Royal Island at mouth of Fowles Creek, Laredo Inlet, 0.40 ha (0.99 acres).
- Saint Joe 10, on Princess Royal Island at outlet of Bloomfield Lake into Laredo Inlet, 0.5 ha (1.2 acres).
- Ulthakoush 11, at head of Laredo Inlet on Princess Royal Island, 2.4 ha (5.9 acres).

== History ==
Twelve of the seventeen crew of United States Air Force 44-92075 were found alive here in 1950, during the first lost nuclear/Broken Arrow episode of the Cold War. The plane itself flew north after the crew bailed out, crashing on Mount Kologet in Swan Lake Kispiox River Provincial Park, east of the Nass River to the northwest of Hazelton.

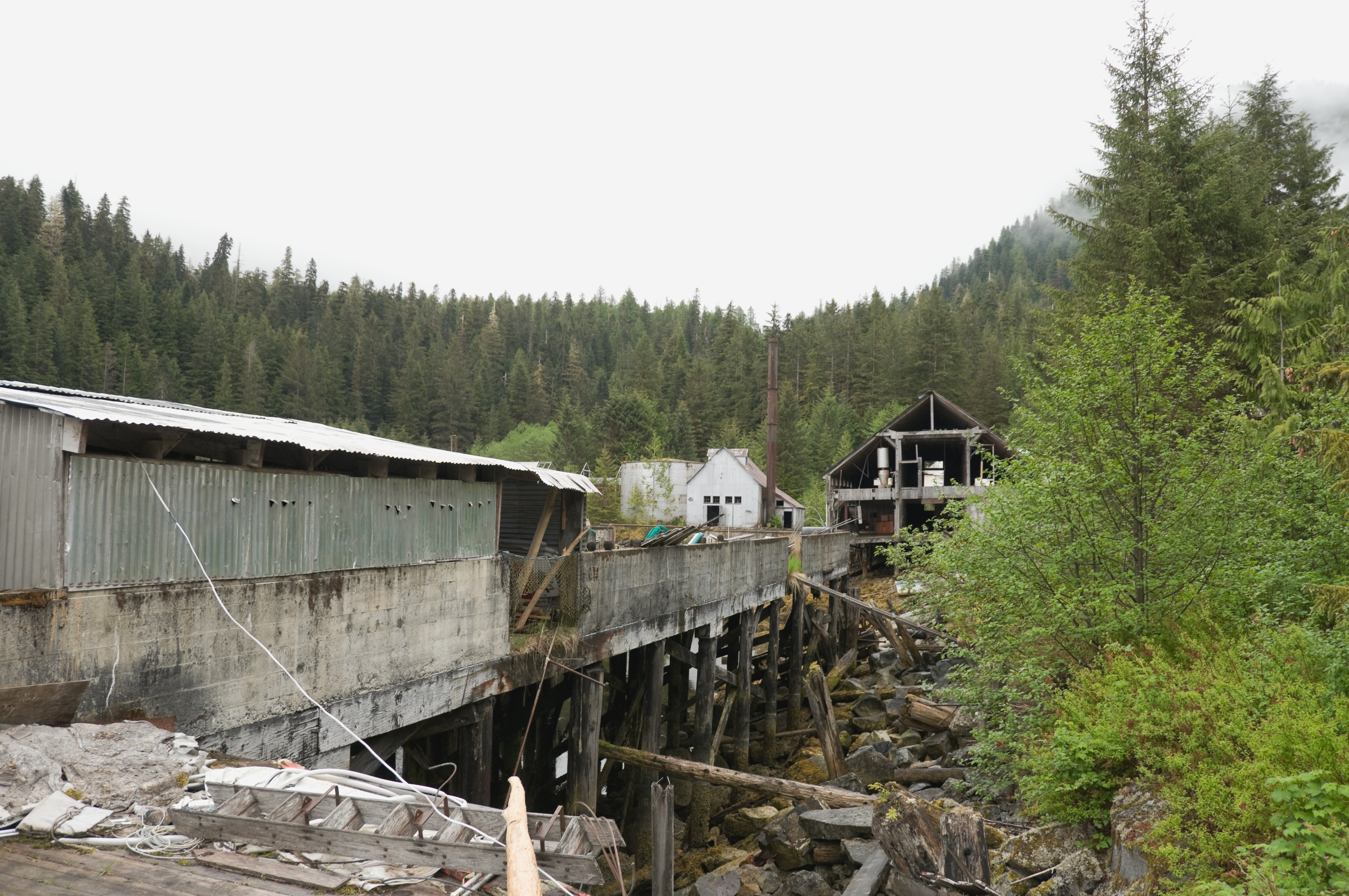
Cannery Ruins in Butedale

== Geography ==
The island's northern tip is Trivett Point and its northwestern tip is Kingcome Point. The Canoona River drains the central part of the island, flowing east to the sea from Canoona Lake.

== Ecology and environment ==
The island is classified by the World Wildlife Fund as part of their system's Pacific temperate rainforest ecoregion. In the ecoregion system used by Environment and Climate Change Canada, the island is in the Pacific Maritime Ecozone. In the system of biogeoclimatic zones used by the British Columbia Ministry of Forests, the island is part of the Coastal Western Hemlock zone, after the Tsuga heterophylla. Wildlife on Princess Royal Island includes spirit bears (kermode bears), black bears, grizzly bears, deer, wolves and foxes, and nesting populations of golden eagles, bald eagles, and the endangered marbled murrelet. Marine life around the island includes abundant salmon, elephant seals, orcas and porpoises. Princess Royal Island is a core component of a regional preservationist campaign covering the North and Central Coast, which has been dubbed the Great Bear Rainforest by environmental groups.

== See also ==
- Estevan Group
- Aristazabal Island
