= Aristazabal Island =

Island in British Columbia, Canada

Coordinates: 52°40′N 129°10′W

Aristazabal Island (French: île Aristizabal) is an island situated south west of Princess Royal Island in British Columbia, Canada. It has an area of 420 square kilometres (160 sq mi). It was named on August 30, 1792 by Lieutenant Commander Jacinto Caamaño of the Spanish corvette Aranzazu for Spanish captain Gabriel de Aristazábal, one of the most noted Spanish commanders of the time. It was misspelled "Aristizable" on a chart owned by English explorer George Vancouver.

== Surrounding islands ==
Thomson Island is situated west of Aristazabal Island in Borrowman Bay.
