= Gitxaała =

Location of Gitxaala Nation

The Gitxaała (People of the sea), are located on the Northwest Coast of British Columbia, and inhabit the village of Lax Klan. Gitxaała don’t refer to themselves as Tsʼmsyen (meaning ‘Inside the Skeena River’).

Stories recording this encounter tell of the acquisition of the hereditary name Heel by the Gispwudwada (Blackfish or Killerwhale clan) House (extended matrilineal family) of Ts'ibasaa, from an English ship's captain.

In the more recent period, one holder of the name Heel also assumed rights over the Gispwudwada chief name Seeks, which represents another Gitxaała Gispwudwada (Blackfish Clan) house group.

One holder of the title Ts'ibasaa was Joshua Ts'ibasaa, who died in 1936. The anthropologist Viola Garfield has published a detailed description of his mortuary potlatch.

Garfield also describes the House of Ts'ibasaa's genealogical merging with another Gispwudwada (Blackfish or Killerwhale clan) house group, the house of Nisweexs (Ts’ibasaa’s nephew) in the Ginadoiks tribe of Ts’msyen at Lax Kw'alaams (Port Simpson), B.C.

A large amount of information on the hereditary names, territories, and oral traditions of the Gitxaała people was collected in 1916 by William Beynon, a Ts’msyen chief and translator in the employ of the ethnologist Marius Barbeau.

The Gitxaała people primarily live in Lax Klan, their main winter (and now permanent) village, and is a large and thriving community. Currently, most community members live away from the village, in 1983, the population of Lax Klan in 1983 was 493, while the band population was 1005. In 2006 the population of Lax Klan was 415.

It has temporarily suspended treaty negotiations with the British Columbia government.

Other Gitxaała house-groups include:

- House of Ayaamax - Ganhada (Raven Clan)
- House of Dzagmgishaaytks – Ganhada (Raven clan)
- House of La'ooy – Ganhada (Raven clan)
- House of Ts'ibasaa – Gispwudwada (Blackfish or Killerwhale clan)

== Gitxaała v. British Columbia (Chief Gold Commissioner) ==
The case argued that the province had granted mineral rights on Lax k’naga dzol (Banks Island), within Gitxaala territory without notifying or consulting the Gitxaała. On September 26, 2023, the Supreme Court of British Columbia found that the mineral claims registration system breached the provincial duty to consult Indigenous peoples.

== Prominent people of Gitxaała ancestry ==
- Joshua Ts’ibasaa, mansm’ooygidm Gitxaała (head chief of Gitxaała)
- William Ewart Gladstone Shakes (hereditary chief Seeks)
- Edward Gamble, hereditary chief (Ts'ibasaa, Heel, Seeks)
- Russell Gamble, hereditary chief and ANBT - basketball administrator (Heel)

== Sources ==
- Barbeau, Marius (1950) Totem Poles. 2 vols. (Anthropology Series 30, National Museum of Canada Bulletin 119.) Ottawa: National Museum of Canada.
- Inglis, Gordon B., et al. (1990) "Tsimshians of British Columbia since 1900." In Handbook of North American Indians, Volume 7: Northwest Coast, pp. 285–293. Washington: Smithsonian Institution.
