= Rainer Schulin =

German zoologist

- Born: Hübenthal (Witzenhausen), Germany
- Known for: Trace elements in soils
- Scientific career
- Fields: Soil protection
- Workplaces: ETH Zurich

Rainer Schulin (born 22 July 1952) is a German zoologist, forest scientist and emeritus professor of soil protection at the ETH Zurich.

== Life ==
Rainer Schulin studied biology at the University of Göttingen and graduated at the University of Zurich in 1976 in zoology. He there completed his PhD thesis in 1981 in zoology and then graduated as a forest engineer at ETH Zurich in 1982. After seven years of research in soil physics he was elected as professor on the newly established ETH Chair of Soil Protection 1990. He has authored or co-authored more than 200 papers in international peer-reviewed journals and is co-author of a German textbook on soil ecology. Rainer Schulin is married and has a daughter.

== Scientific contributions ==
In a model ecosystem experiment Schulin and coworkers showed that soil can play a key role in the growth and evapotranspiration responses of young forest vegetation on elevated atmospheric carbon dioxide. Up to then soil had been neglected as a factor in the response of vegetation to elevated carbon dioxide.

In another model ecosystem experiment Schulin's team found that moderate topsoil pollution by heavy metals significantly reduced evapotranspiration of a young forest vegetation due to reduced root growth, in particular during periods of drought stress, and that roots compensated for metal toxicity in the topsoil by increasing water extraction from the subsoil. It could also be demonstrated that the biodegradable chelant EDDS can be used to enhance phytoextraction of polluting metals by mobilizing the metals in the soil, although metal-EDDS complexes are less available for uptake by roots through the symplastic pathway than free metal ions.

Schulin et al. also showed how much care has to be taken in attributing soil pollution to specific sources. Detailed analyses of soil profiles revealed that – in contrast to the conclusions of previous investigations based on spatial distributions of topsoil metal concentrations – the majority of metals in the vicinity of a ferrous metal smelter were of geogenic origin.

Also in contrast to previous belief that macropores invariably are the most compaction-sensitive types of soil pores Schulin and teamworkers showed that this only holds for packing voids between soil aggregates, whereas cylindrical macropores are in fact much more robust than bulk soil against deformation by compaction. Neutron radiography was proved as a powerful tool to simultaneously determine soil water content and root development in soil.

== Memberships ==
- Associate Editor of the Journal of Environmental Quality, 2005-2011
- Expert for the German Research Foundation (DFG), in particular in the expert boards of DFG priority research programmes.
- Evaluation panels of various research programs of the Swiss National Science Foundation (SNSF)
- Committee of the Swiss Soil Science Society, 1998-2004, including two years as president.
- Executive Board of the International Society of Trace Element Biogeochemistry (ISTEB), 2003–2007

== Publications (books) ==
- Gisi, Ulrich, Rudolf Schenker, Rainer Schulin, Franz X. Stadelmann und Hans Sticher. 1997. Bodenökologie. Thieme-Verlag, Stuttgart.

== Publication list ==
Peer reviewed articles and book chapters
