= Kxngeal Inlet =

Inlet in British Columbia

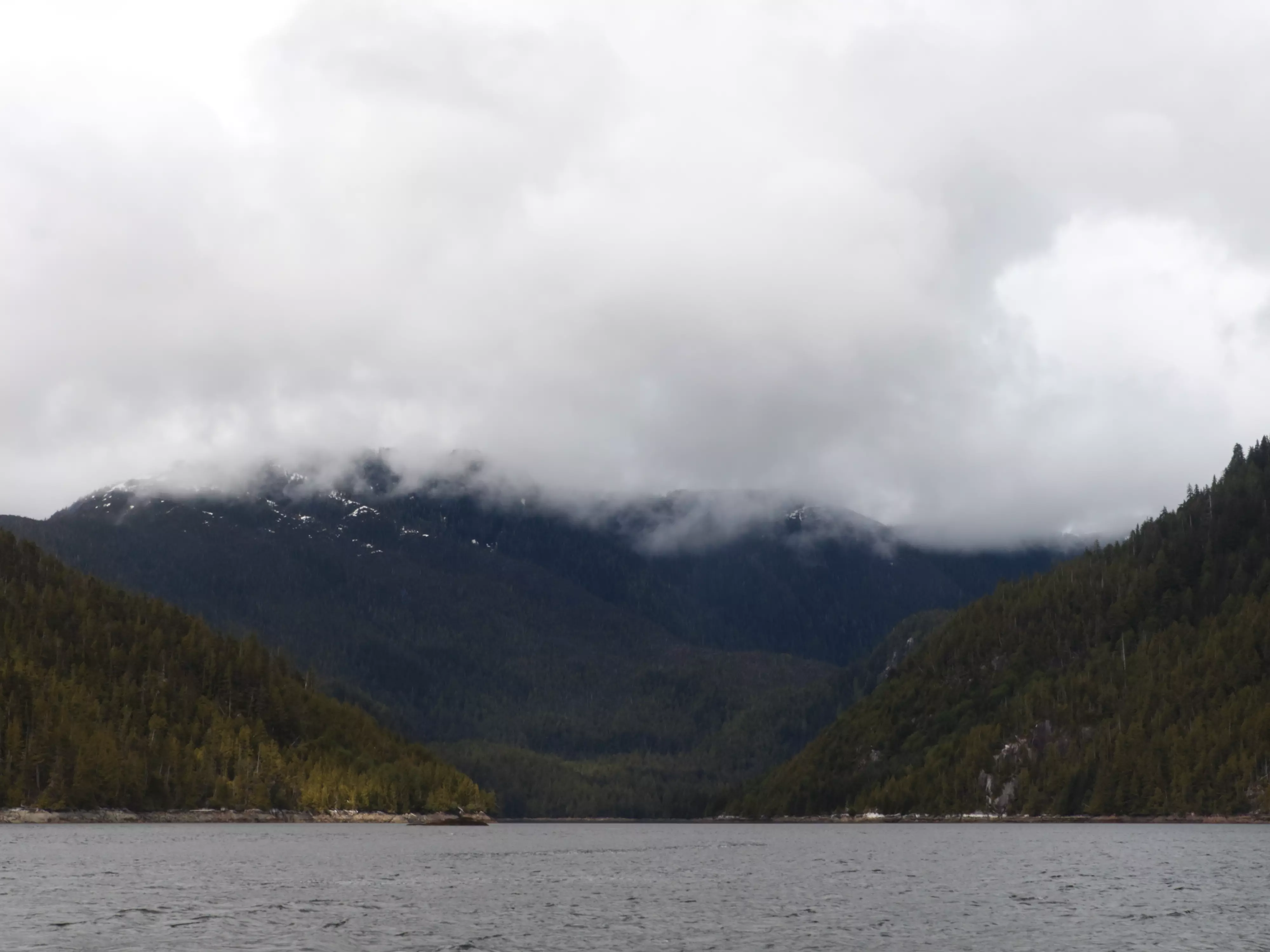
- Entrance to Kxngeal Inlet, from Grenville Channel

- Location in British Columbia
- Location: North Coast RD, British Columbia
- Coordinates: 53°44′40″N 129°49′32″W
- Type: Inlet
- Ocean/sea sources: Pacific Ocean

Kxngeal Inlet is an inlet in the North Coast region of British Columbia, Canada, extending east from Grenville Channel opposite Pitt Island, to the north of Klewnuggit Inlet Marine Provincial Park. The inlet is considered part of the traditional territories of the Kitsumkalum, a Galts'ap of the Tsimshian Nation.

== See also ==
- Inside Passage
