= Heat injury =

Heat injury may refer to:

- Burns
- Hyperthermia
- Heat illness
- Abiotic stress
