= Pa-aat River =

Pa-aat River Salmon river
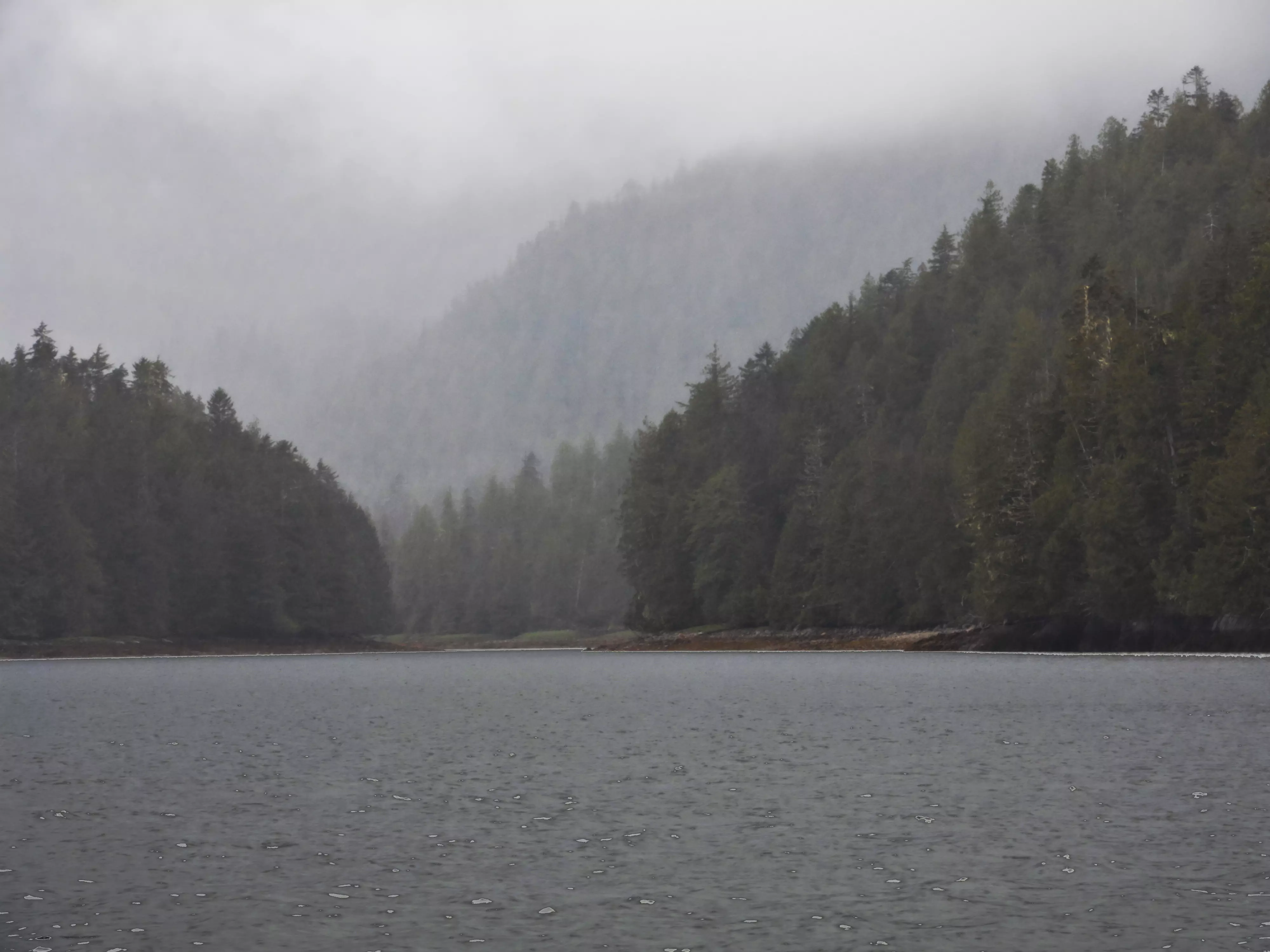
- Mouth of the Pa-aat River, seen from Grenville Channel

Location
- Country: Canada
- Province: British Columbia
- Indian reserve: Pa-aat 6

Physical characteristics
- Source: Pitt Island
- Mouth: Pacific Ocean
  - location: Grenville Channel
  - coordinates: 53°48′31″N 130°00′19″W
  - elevation: 0 m (0 ft)

The Pa-aat River, formerly known as the Salmon River and also as the Paaat River, is a small river on Pitt Island in the North Coast region of British Columbia, Canada. It flows north to enter Grenville Channel opposite Baker Inlet via Salmon Inlet, at the mouth of which is Pa-aat Indian Reserve No. 6, which is governed by the Gitxaala Nation of the Tsimshian.

== See also ==
- Salmon River (disambiguation)
- List of rivers of British Columbia
