= Pitt Island (Canada) =

Island in British Columbia, Canada

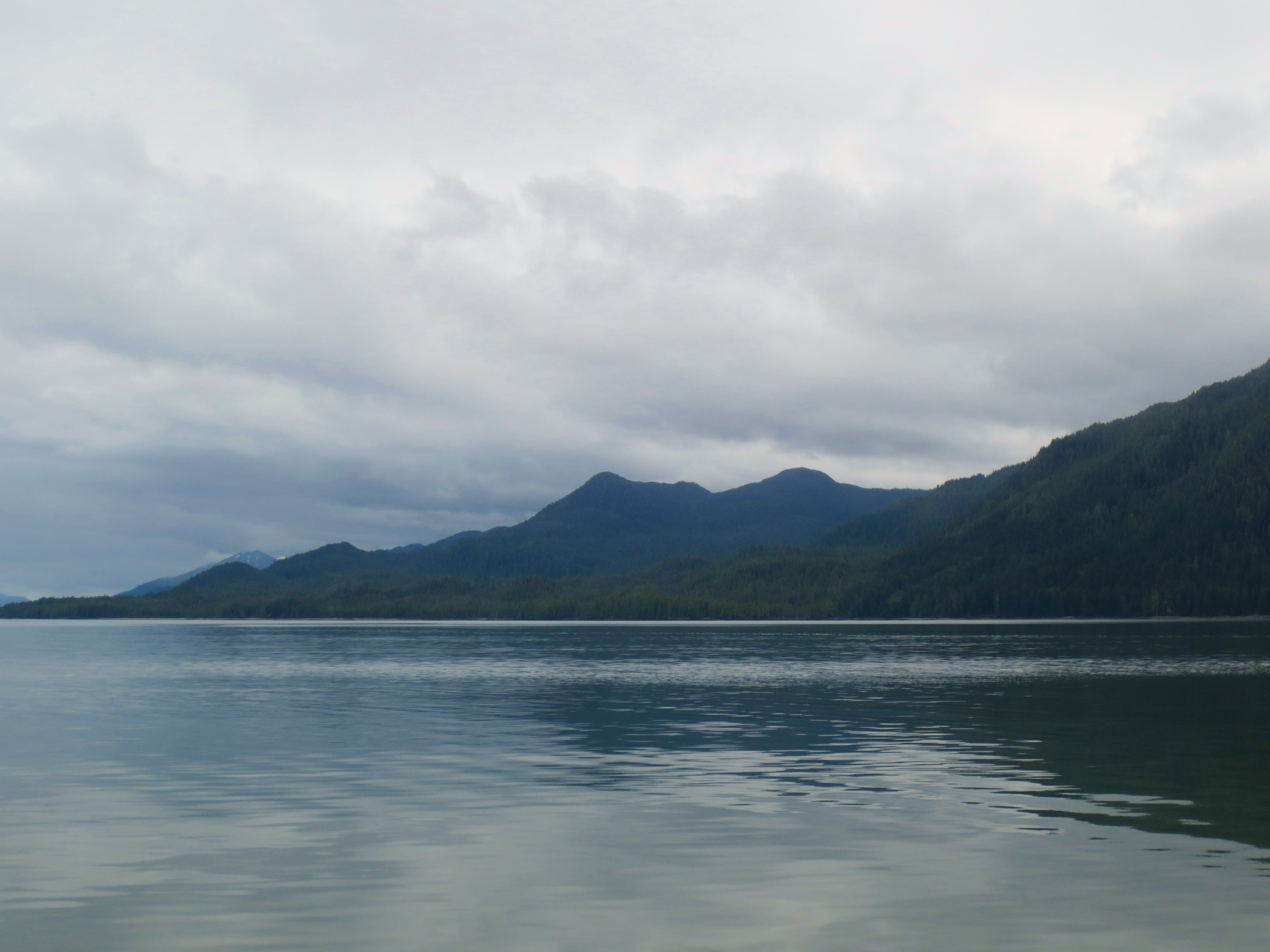
- Northern End of Pitt Island as seen from Grenville Channel

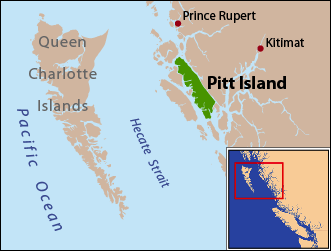
- Pitt Island is located between Banks Island and the mainland.

Geography
- Coordinates: 53°30′00″N 129°47′00″W
- Area: 1,398.55 km^{2} (539.98 sq mi) (2026) (Note: Area from the United States Geological Survey, Esri, and the United Nations Environment Programme - World Conservation Monitoring Centre unless indicated otherwise)
- Area rank: 40th in Canada & 270th worldwide
- Length: 90 km (56 mi)
- Width: 8 km (5 mi)
- Highest elevation: 962 m (3156 ft)

Administration
- Canada
- Province: British Columbia

Pitt Island is an island located on the north coast of British Columbia, Canada. The island is of cultural and ecological importance.

Pitt island is located between Banks Island, across Grenville Channel (part of the Inside Passage) from the mainland, and is separated from Banks Island by Principe Channel. The island is mountainous and heavily dissected by valleys, fjords, and inlets and has an area of 1,398.55 km^{2} (539.98 sq mi), is 90 km (56 mi) long, and ranges from 8 to 23 km (5.0 to 14.3 mi) wide. Its highest point is at 962 m (3,156 ft).

Pitt Island is the only island in British Columbia known to host a resident population of moose.

== History ==
The Gitxaala occupied the island in the past, with a fishing and hunting village for each family group, and have identified this island as part the laxyuup (traditional territories and waters) of the Gitxaala.

In 1792, Jacinto Caamafio commanding the frigate Aránzazu visited a village on the island.

== Geology ==
Pitt Island lies within the Coast Range Arc, part of the broader Coast Mountains geological province formed by subduction and terrane accretion along the edge of North American Plate. The island is part of an ancient collage that makes up the British Columbia Coast, where multiple island arcs and seafloor were accreted onto the Continental margin over hundreds of millions of years. The Coast Range Intrusive Complex, which includes Pitt Island, formed primarily in the mid to late Mesozoic as subduction processes drove extensive magmatism and crustal growth.

The dominant bedrock consists of intrusive rocks, mainly diorites and quartz diorites of acidic composition, that make up much of the island’s interior. These rocks represent magma that crystallized deep underground during the Cretaceous and were later exposed at the surface by tectonic uplift and erosion. Like much of the coast, the island's superficial deposits, soils, colluvium, and glacial drift, were influenced by Pleistocene glaciation, which carved steep relief across the landscape.

== Features ==
- Anchor Mountain
- Captain Cove
- Holmes Lake
- Hevenor Inlet
- Newcombe Harbour
- Pa-aat River
- Patterson Inlet
- Port Stevens
- Monckton Inlet
- Mount Hulke
- Mount Patterson
- Mount Frank
- Mount Saunders
- Mount Shields
- Wyndham Lake
- Red Bluff Lake

== Protected Areas ==
- Union Passage Marine Provincial Park
- Maxtaktsm'Aa/Union Passage Conservancy
- Monckton Nii Luutiksm Conservancy
- Pa-aat Conservancy
