= Kumealon Inlet =

Inlet in British Columbia

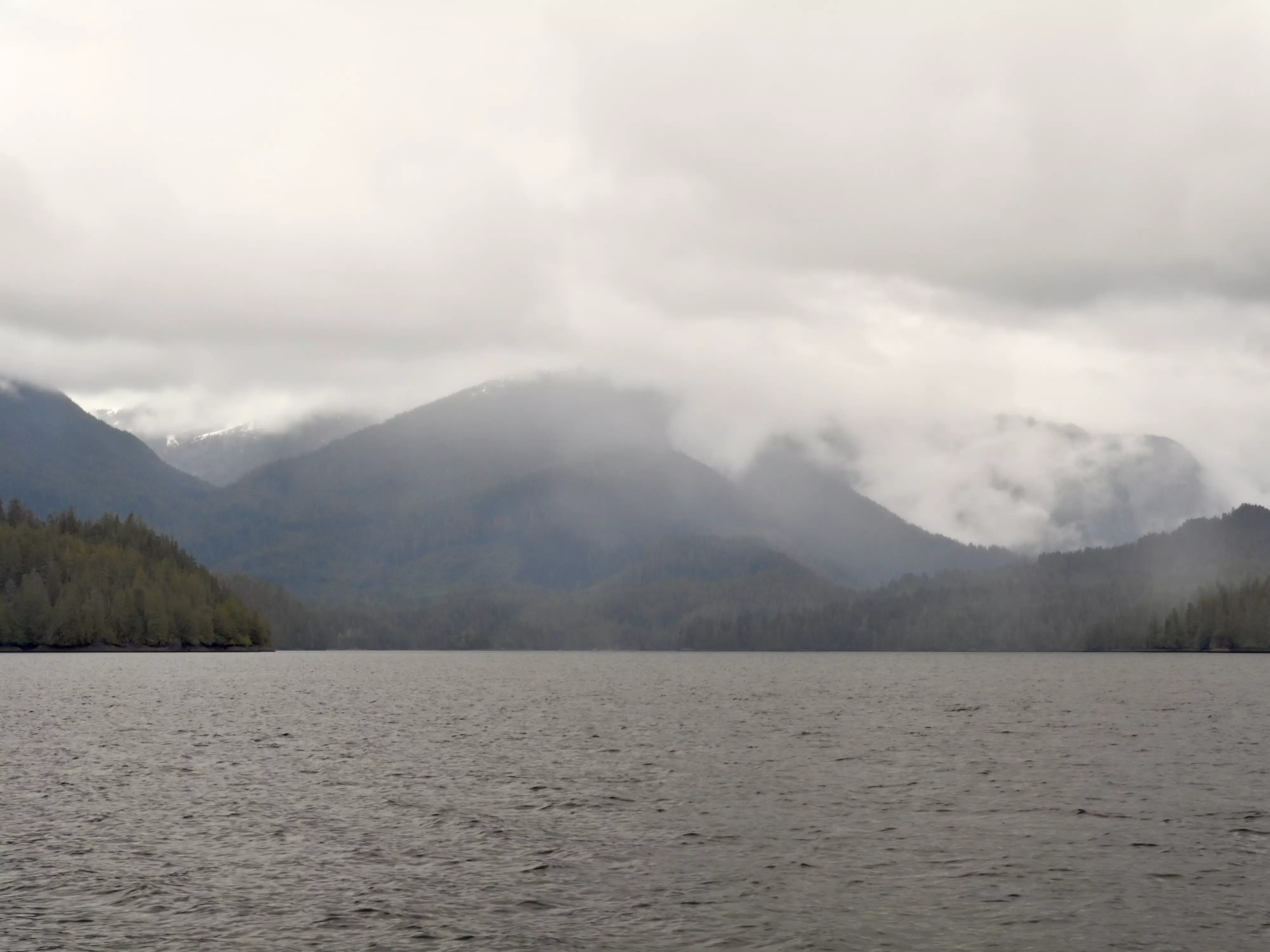
- Mist falls into Kumealon Inlet, British Columbia, Canada

- Location within British Columbia
- Location: British Columbia
- Coordinates: 53°51′39″N 129°59′33″W
- Type: Fjord
- Primary outflows: Grenville Channel

Kumealon Inlet is an inlet on the Coast of British Columbia, Canada. It lies on the eastern side of the north end of Grenville Channel facing Pitt Island.

Kumealon Inlet sits between the Ecstall Pluton and the Grenville Channel shear zone, and is bounded by rocks dating to the Albian (102.6±3.7Ma). The inlet provides an extensive tidal course, well protected from storm surge, and has a sheltered foreshore combined with substantial tidal flats.

== History ==
Kumealon Inlet is within the traditional territories of the Southern Tsimshian, and contains groves of culturally modified trees.

== Features ==
Connected features to the inlet are:

- Kumealon Island, located on the north side of the entrance to the inlet at 53°51′24″N 130°01′29″W
- Kumealon Lagoon, a small arm on the north side of the inlet at 53°53′03″N 129°59′20″W, connected to it via:
- Kumealon Narrows, a short narrows at 53°52′25″N 129°59′11″W
- Kumealon Creek, a short creek which feeds northwest into Kumealon Lagoon, entering it at 53°52′41″N 129°58′02″W

== Images ==
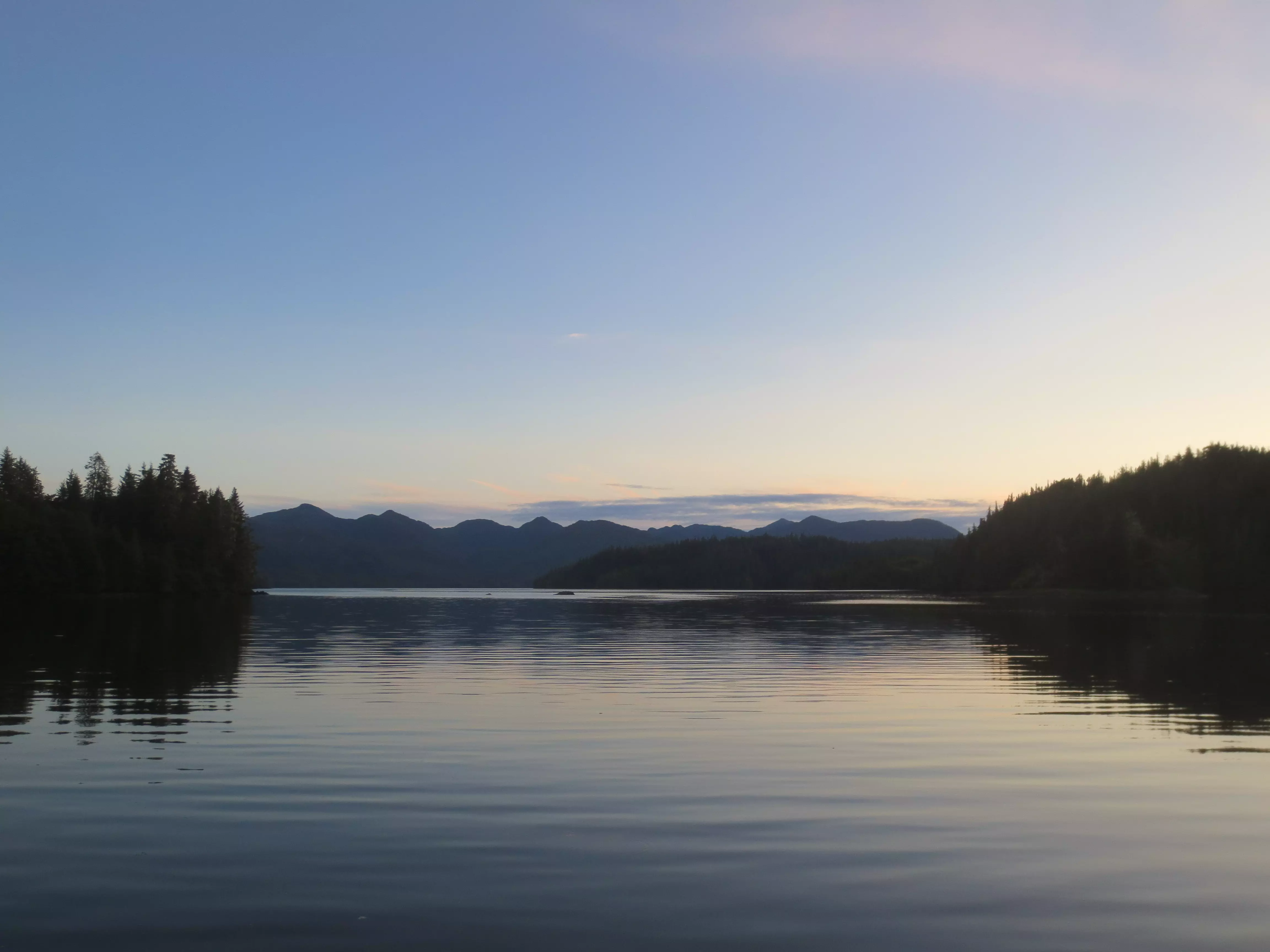
Looking westward from the head of Kumealon Inlet towards the entrance

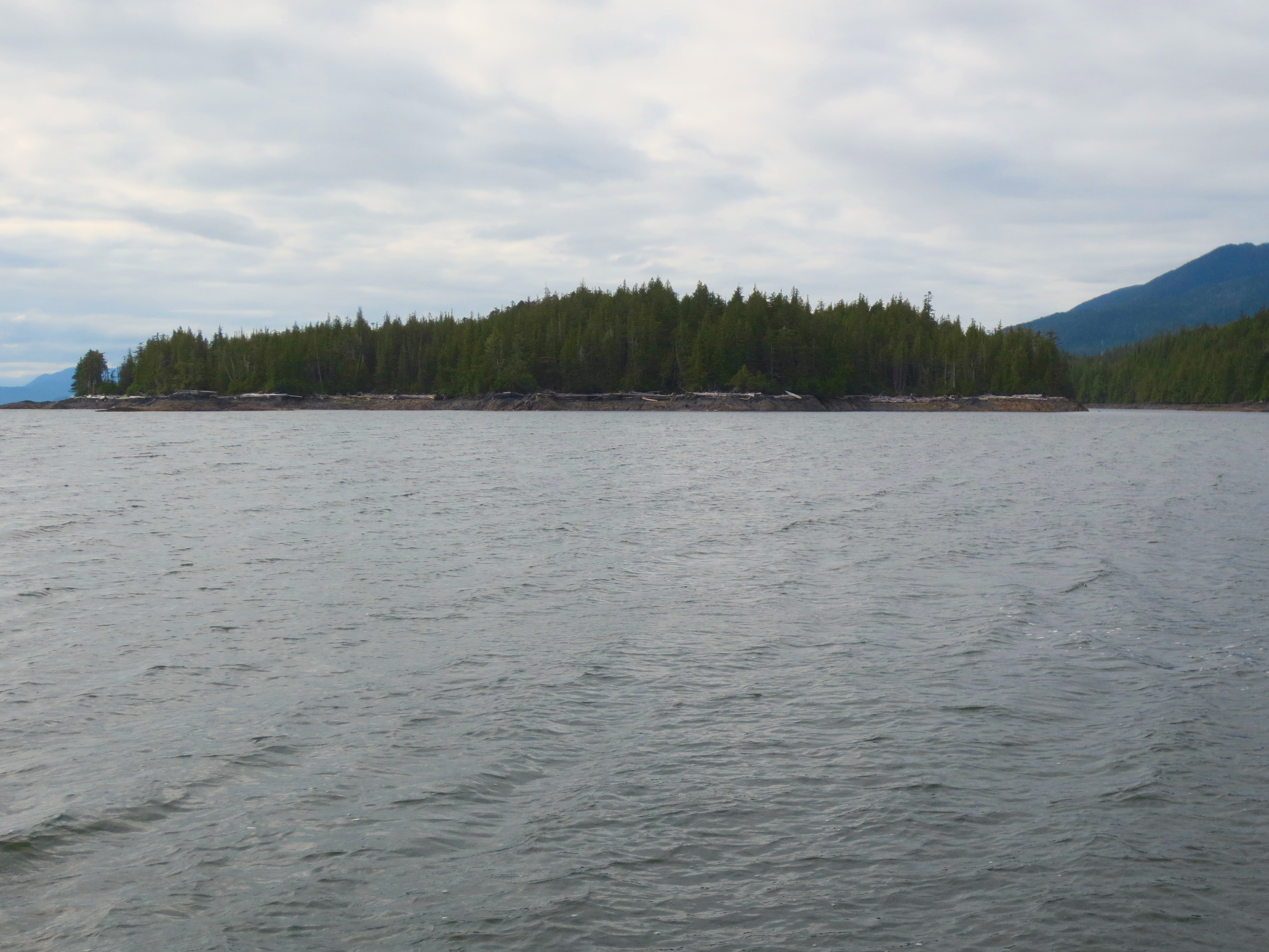
Kumealon Island

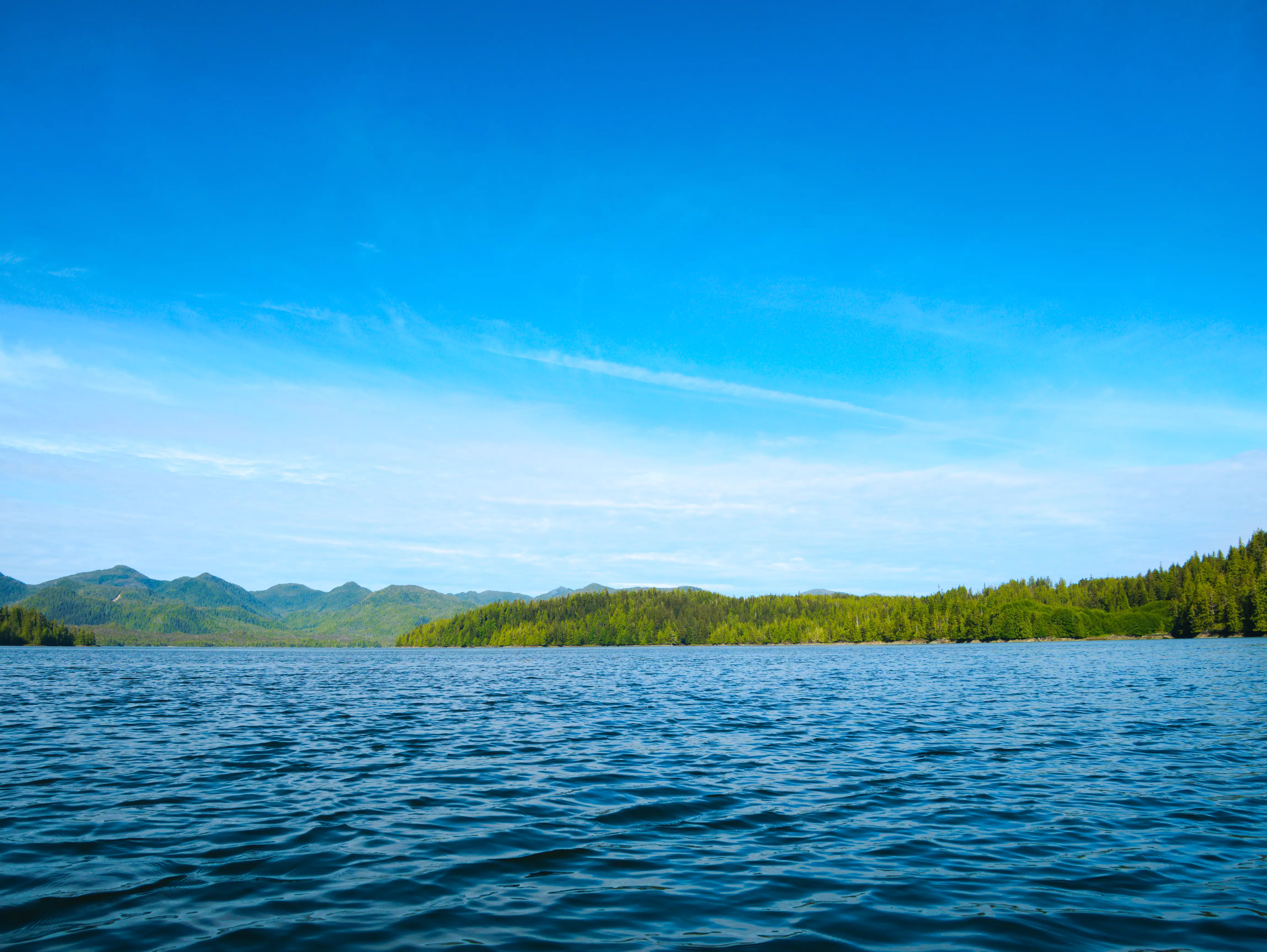
Looking westward along Kumealon Inlet in the morning

== See also ==
- Inside Passage
- Baker Inlet
