= Grenville Channel =

Strait in the North Coast region of British Columbia, Canada

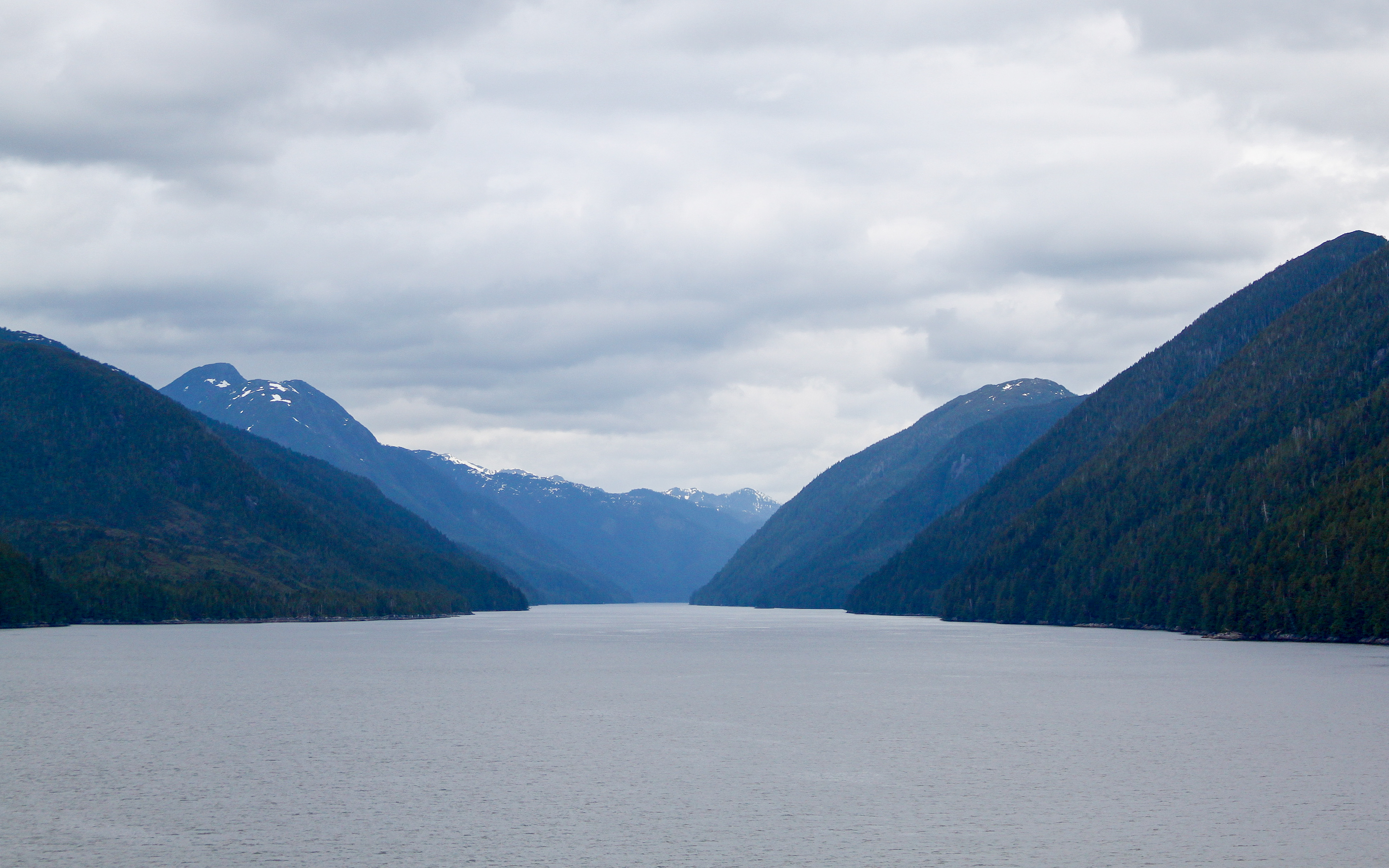
- Grenville Channel

- Location in British Columbia
- Location: North Coast RD, British Columbia
- Coordinates: 53°37′0″N 129°43′0″W
- Type: Strait
- Ocean/sea sources: Pacific Ocean
- Max. length: 45 nautical miles (83 km; 52 mi)

Grenville Channel is a strait on the North Coast of British Columbia, Canada, between Pitt Island and the mainland to the south of Prince Rupert. It is part of the Inside Passage shipping route, about 45 nautical miles (83 km; 52 mi) long and is 0.2 nautical miles (0.37 km; 0.23 mi) wide at its narrowest point.

The Grenville Channel Fault that forms the channel dates back to the Cretaceous Era. Both sides are mountainous and densely wooded, and a linear magnetic anomaly runs parallel to the channel south of 51"30'N.

== See also ==
- Baker Inlet
- Pa-aat River
- Kumealon Inlet
- Kxngeal Inlet
- Klewnuggit Inlet Marine Provincial Park
- Lowe Inlet Marine Provincial Park
- Union Passage Marine Provincial Park
