= Captain Cove =

Cove

- Kla’tin
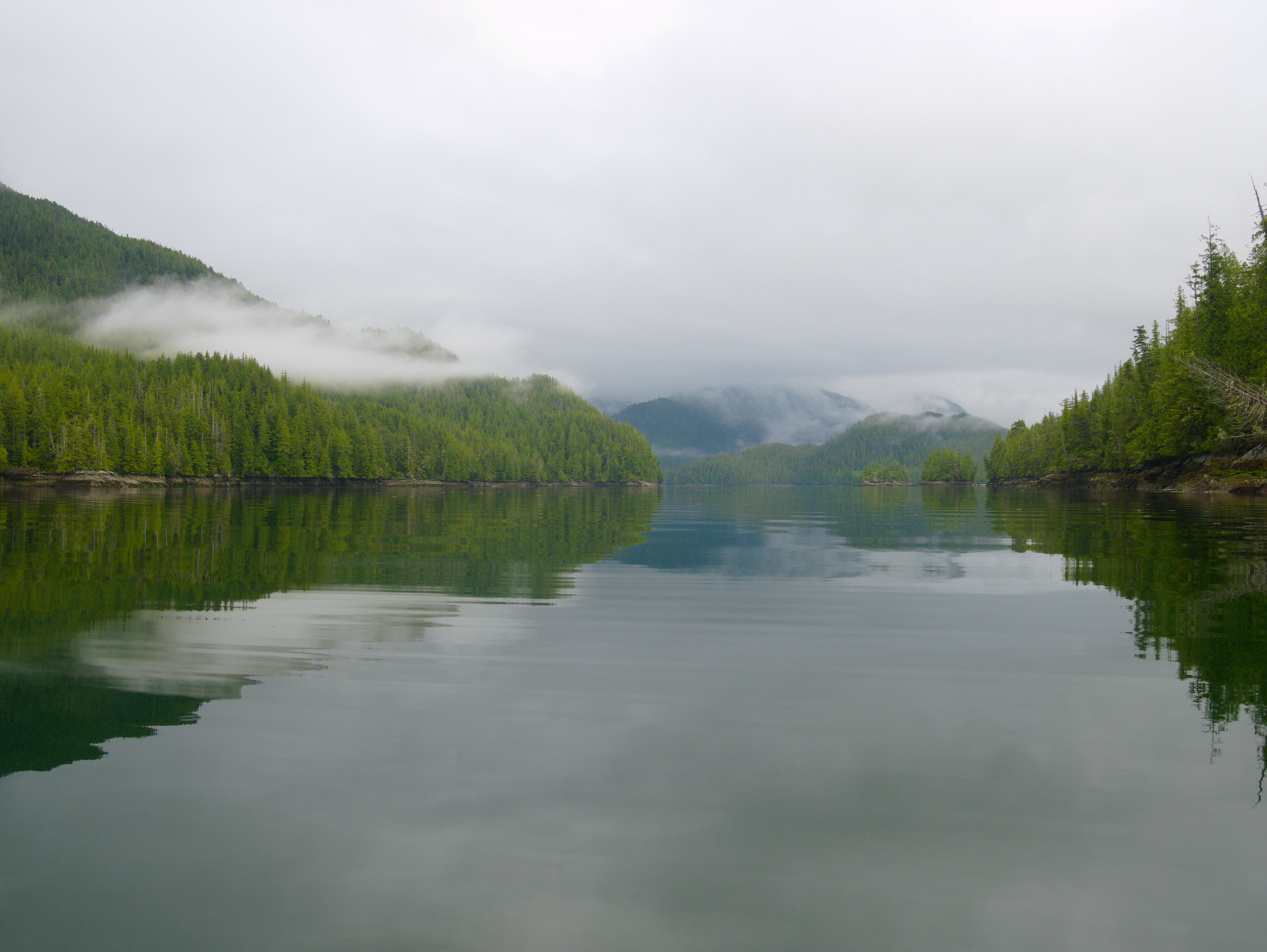
- Looking up Captain Cove, Pitt Island, from Captain Point

- Location within British Columbia
- Location: British Columbia, Canada
- Coordinates: 53°48′44″N 130°11′49″W
- Type: Fjord
- Part of: Pitt Island
- Max. length: 1 nautical mile (1.9 km; 1.2 mi)
- Max. width: 0.375 nautical miles (0.695 km; 0.432 mi)
- Max. depth: 20 fathoms (120 ft; 37 m)

Captain Cove (Kla’tin) is a cove located on Pitt Island, British Columbia, Canada. It was named after Captain Holmes Newcombe of the Fisheries Department.

The cove is 1 nmi (1.9 km; 1.2 mi) long and between 0.125–0.375 nmi (0.232–0.695 km; 0.144–0.432 mi) wide, and contains several islets, approximately 0.5 nmi (0.93 km; 0.58 mi) east of Captain Point. The cove is underlain by the large 100 by 25 km (62 by 16 mi) Captain Cove Pluton dating to the Albian (109±6Ma).

The cove preserves a record of intense prehistoric use, with a few large shell middens and several small shell middens associated with creeks flowing into the cove.
