= Newcombe Harbour =

Harbour on Pitt Island, British Columbia, Canada

- Sgasgi’nis (Tsimshian)
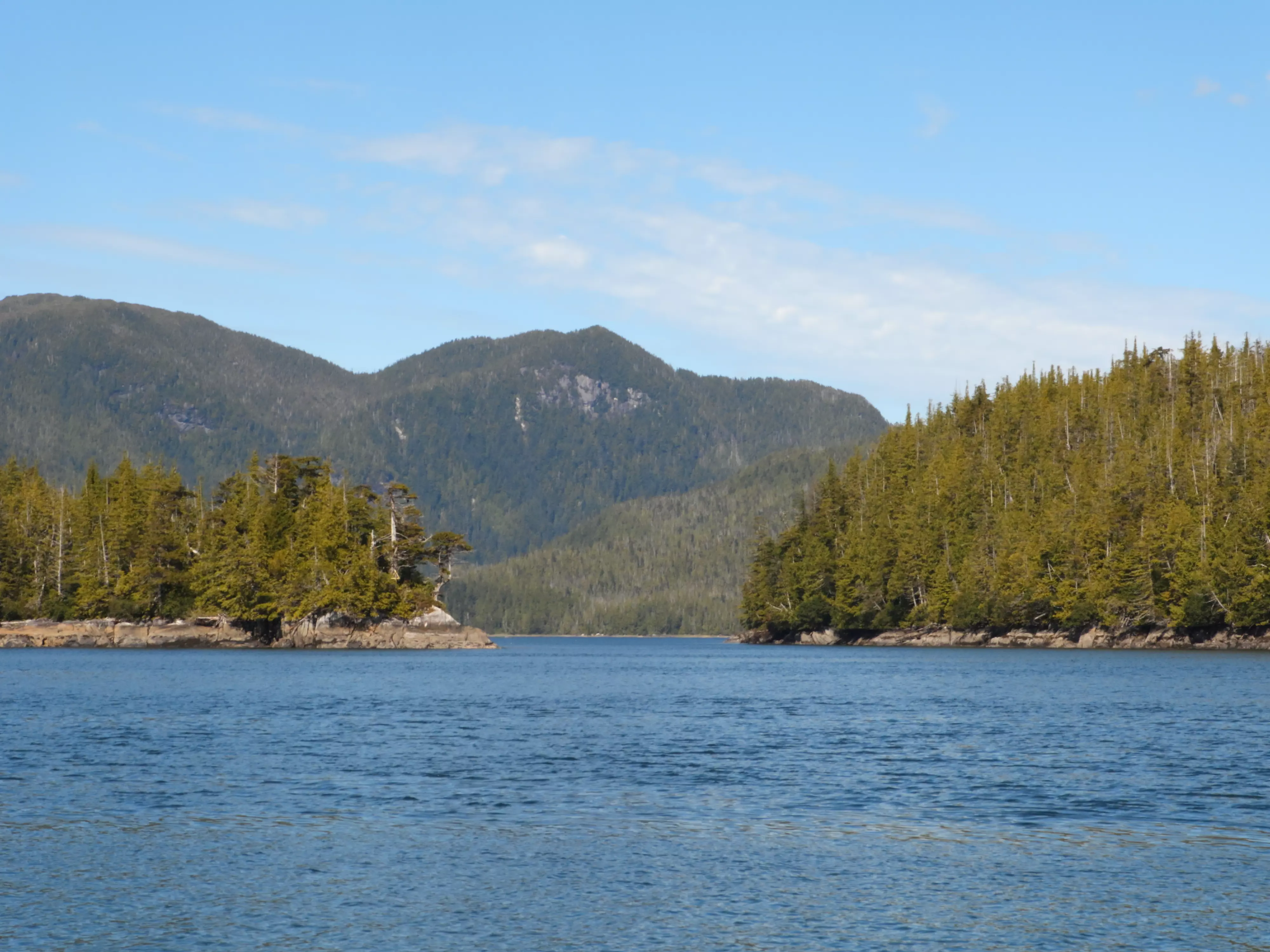
- Entrance to Newcombe Harbour, off Petrel Channel, part of Pitt Island
- Interactive map of Newcombe Harbour
- Location: British Columbia, Canada
- Coordinates: 53°42′47″N 130°05′18″W
- Type: Harbor
- Part of: Pitt Island
- Max. length: 0.75 nautical miles (1.39 km; 0.86 mi)
- Max. width: 0.25 nautical miles (0.46 km; 0.29 mi)
- Max. depth: 13 fathoms (78 ft; 24 m)

Newcombe Harbour is a natural harbour located on Pitt Island, British Columbia, Canada. Currently named after Captain Holmes Newcombe who was with the Fisheries Protection Service from 1903 to 1923.

The entrance is 300 feet (91 m) wide, while the body is 0.75 nautical miles (1.39 km; 0.86 mi) long and between 0.0125–0.25 nautical miles (0.0232–0.4630 km; 0.0144–0.2877 mi) wide. The harbor has drying banks at its head, and is surrounded by nine mountains.

== Ecology ==
The harbour and surrounding area is known for an abundance of (parastichopus californicus) sea cucumbers, (panopea generosa) geoduck clams, and red and green sea urchins.
