= Hevenor Inlet =

Fjord in Pitt Island, British Columbia

- K’t’a’i (Tsimshian)
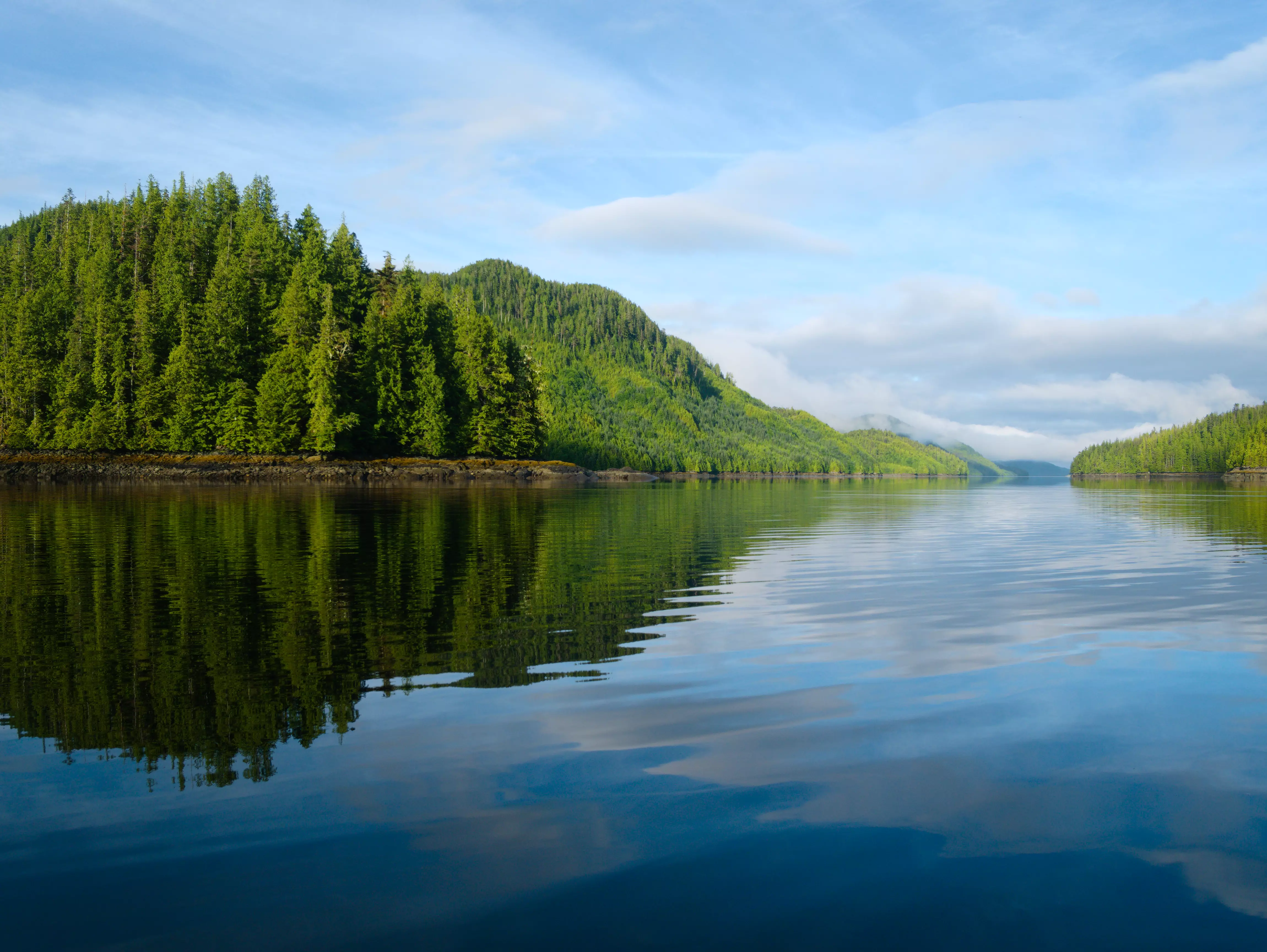
- Looking westward down Hevenor Inlet

- Location within British Columbia
- Location: British Columbia
- Coordinates: 53°38′28″N 129°59′17″W
- Type: Fjord
- Part of: Pitt Island (Canada)
- Max. length: 3.4 nautical miles (6.3 km; 3.9 mi)
- Max. width: 0.6 nautical miles (1.1 km; 0.69 mi)
- Islands: Clark Islet, Hevenor Islet

Hevenor Inlet extends eastward from Petrel Channel on the northwest side of Pitt Island, British Columbia, Canada.

The inlet is entered between Stark Point and Hevenor Point, and contains Clark and Hevenor islets. A narrow entrance connects the inlet to Hevenor Lagoon 4 nautical miles (7.4 km; 4.6 mi) southeast of the head of the inlet.

Two Indian Reserves adjoin the inlet, Pitt Island 27 on the north shore near the entrance, and Ketai 28 midway down the south shore.

Hevenor Inlet is surrounded by waterfalls, including the Cascades, a linear series of waterfalls at the head of the inlet.

== Image Gallery ==
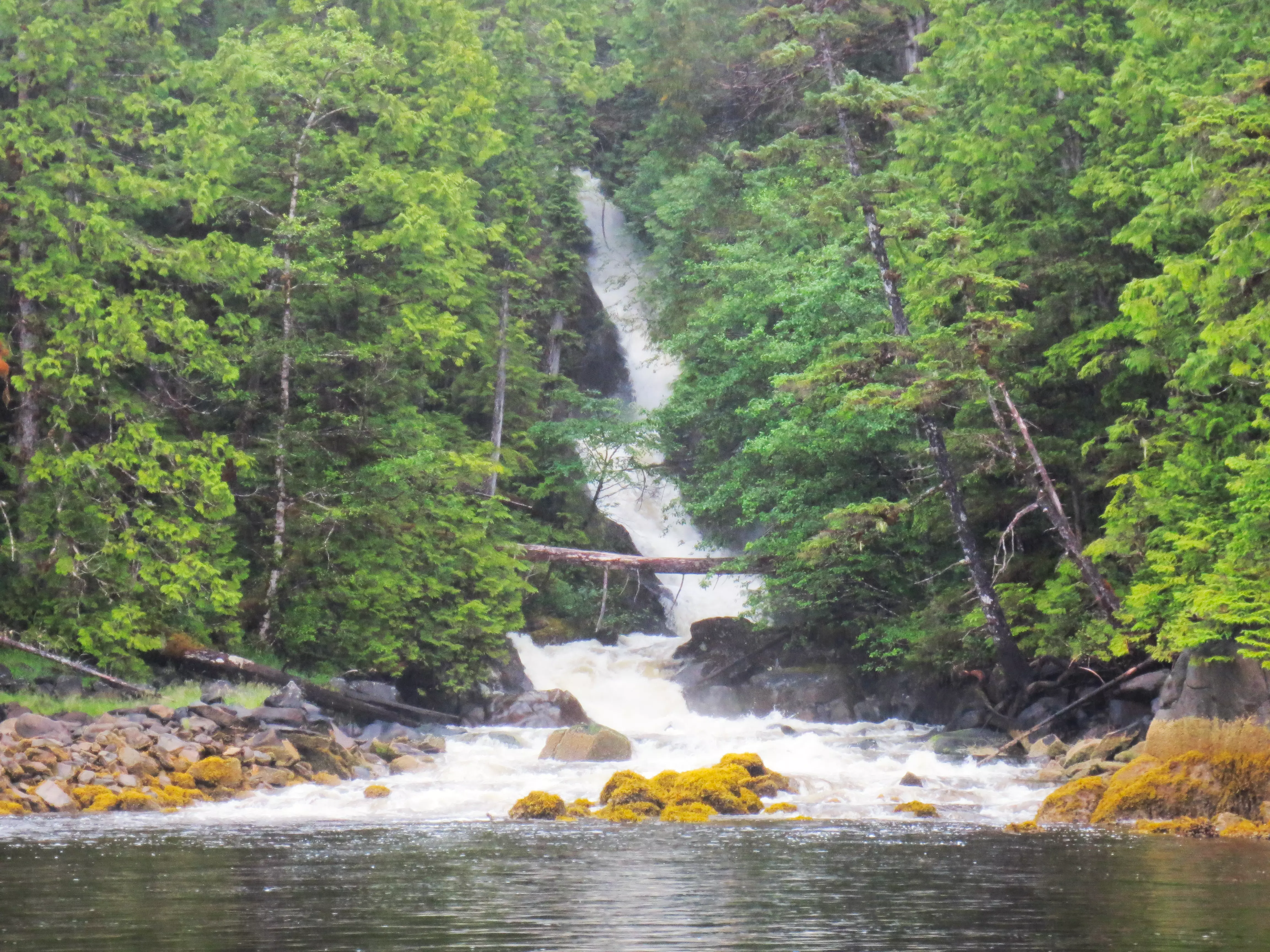
The mouth of the Cascades at the head of Hevenor Inlet

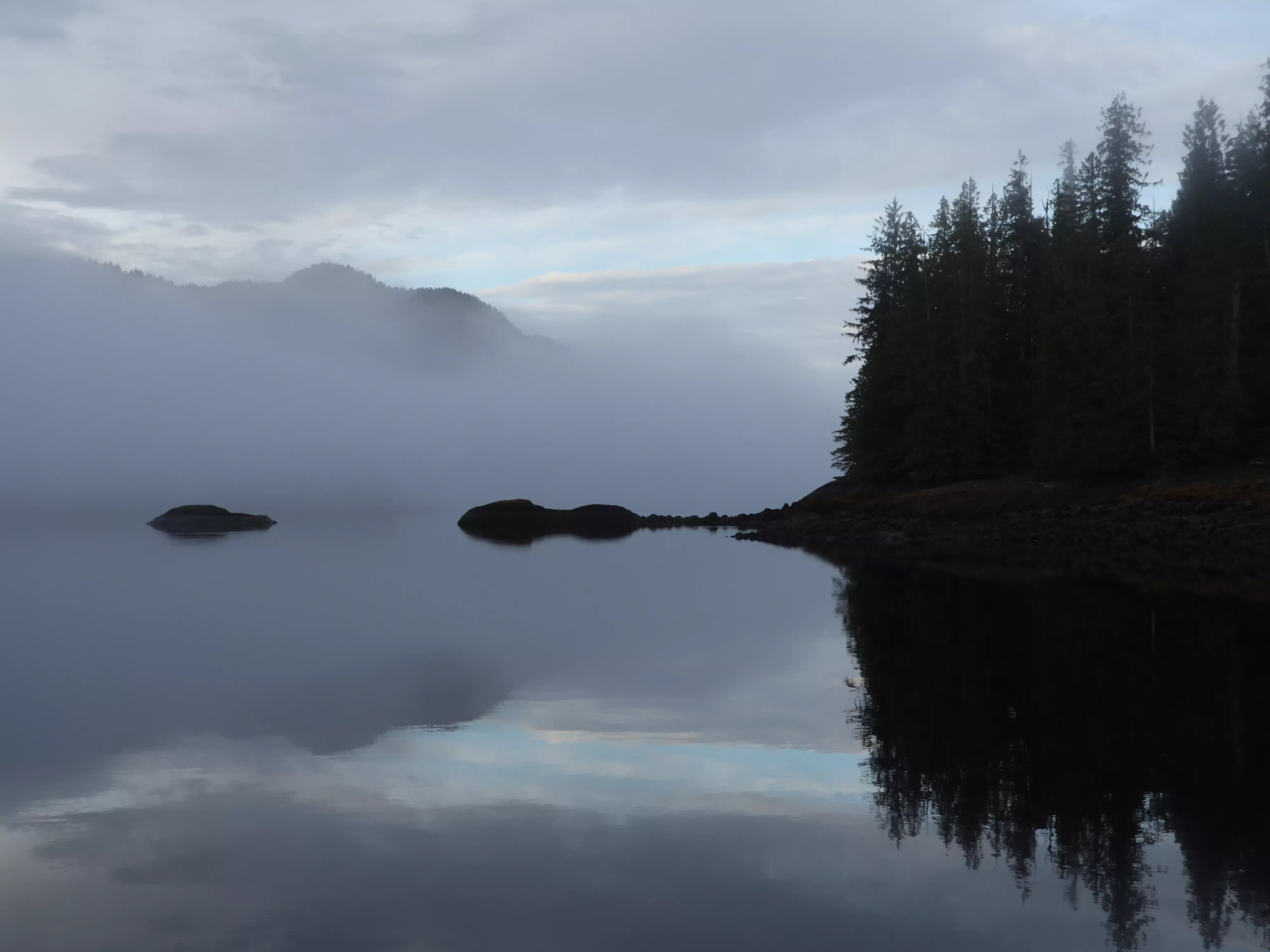
Fog lifting around Clark Islet

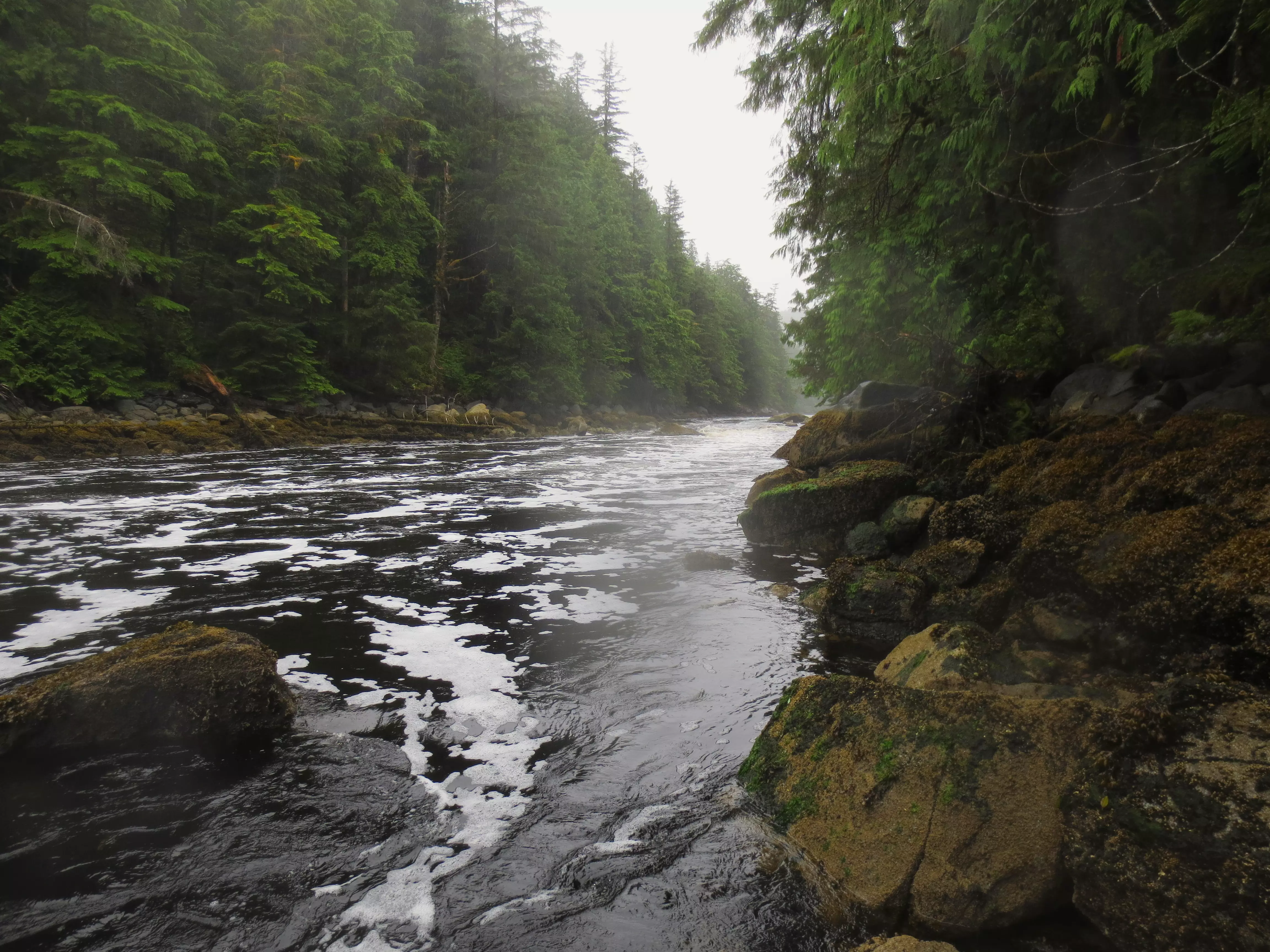
The narrows between the Inlet and the Lagoon

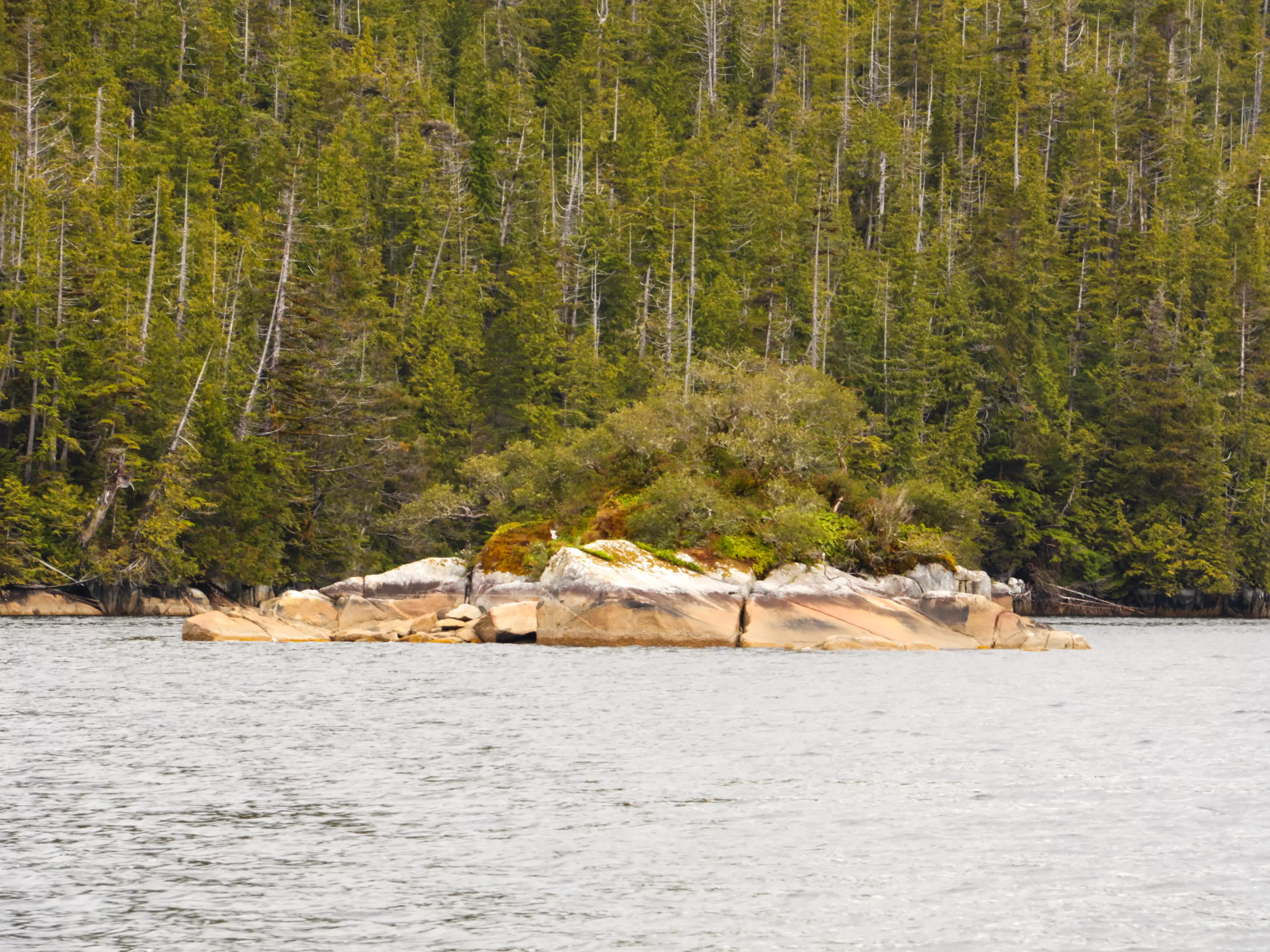
Looking at Hevenor Islet from the southwest

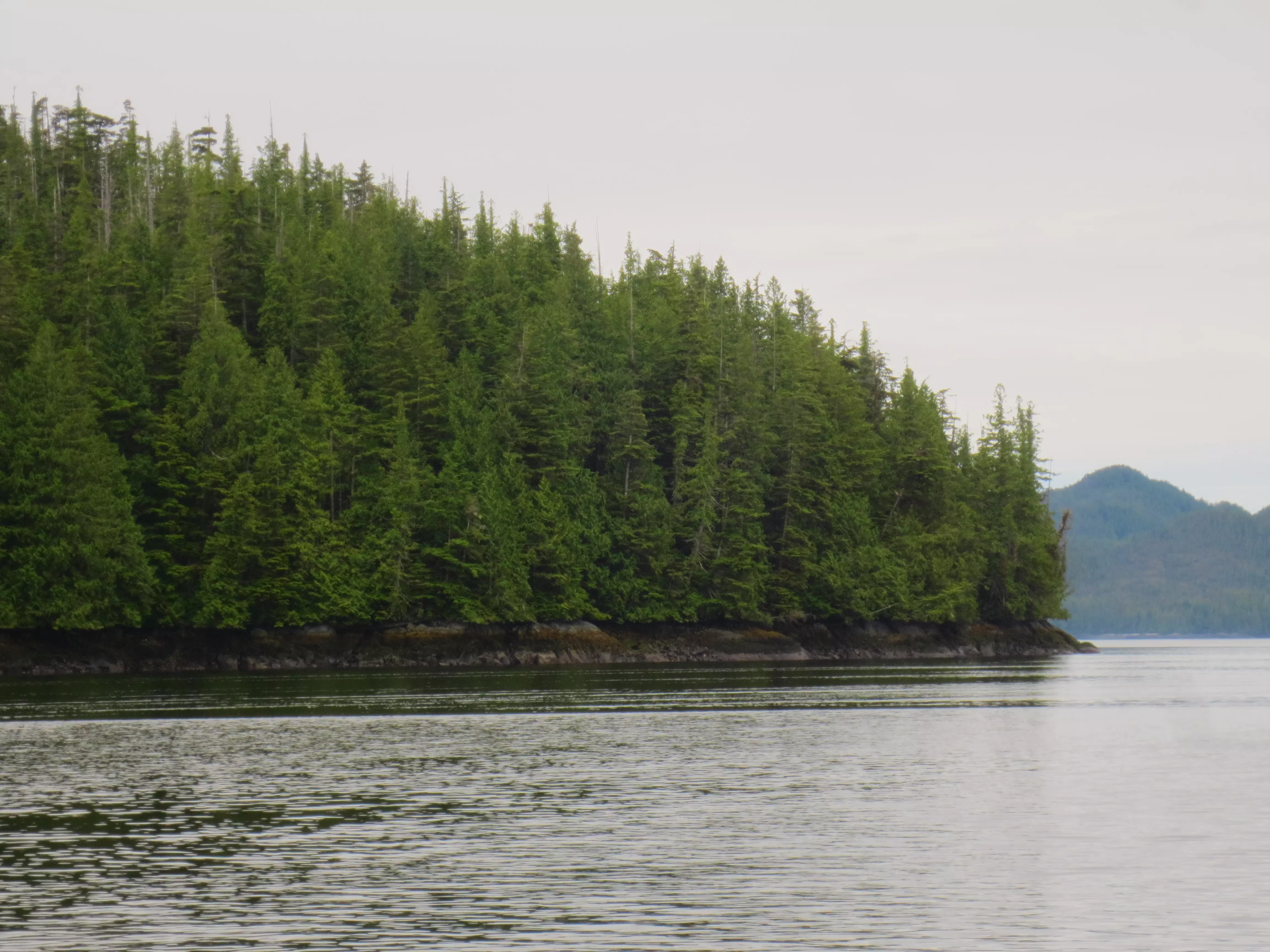
Stark Point, south of the mouth of Hevenor Inlet

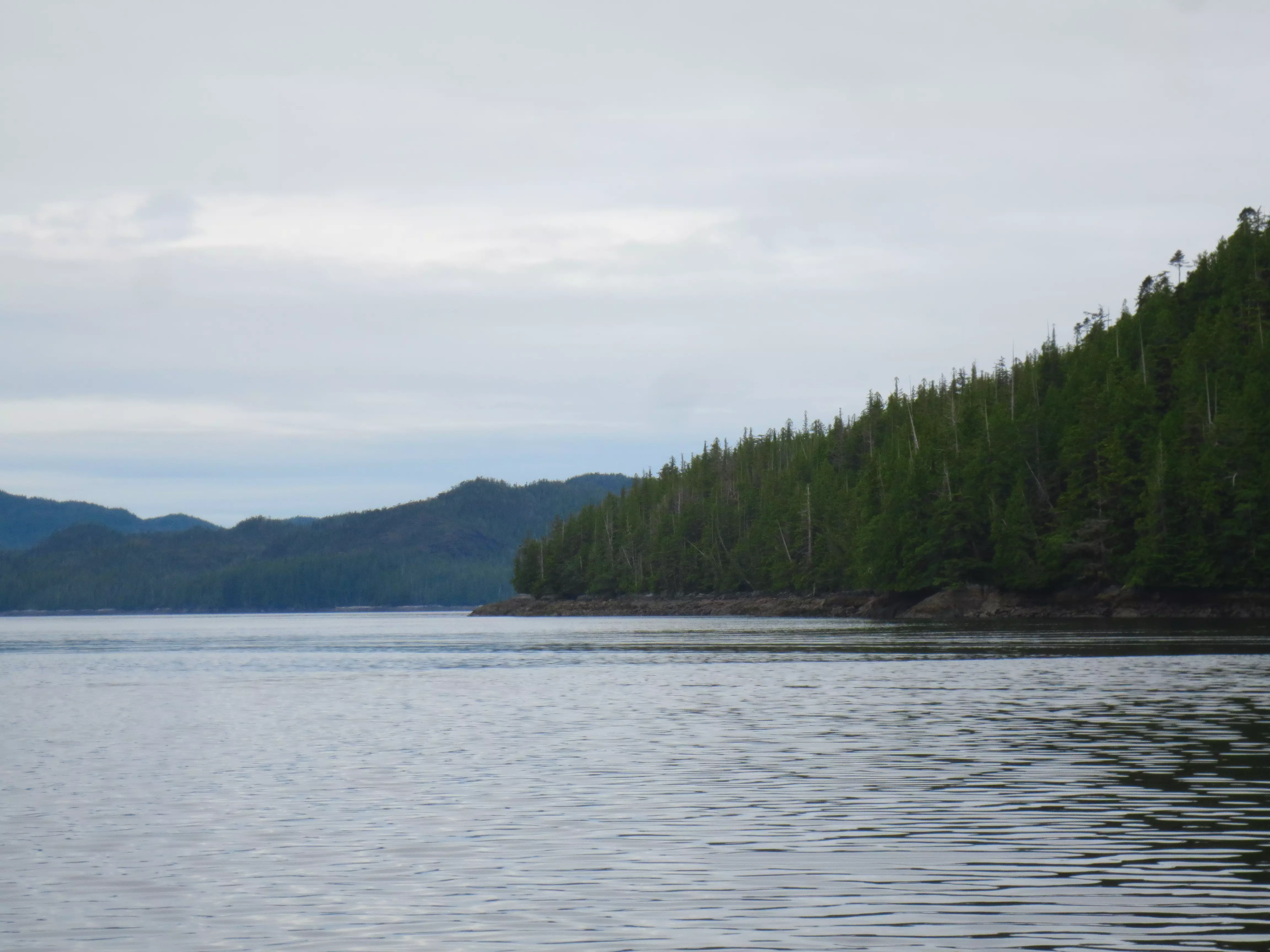
Hevenor Point, north of the mouth of Hevenor Inlet
