= Klewnuggit Inlet Marine Provincial Park =

Provincial park in British Columbia, Canada

- IUCN category II (national park)
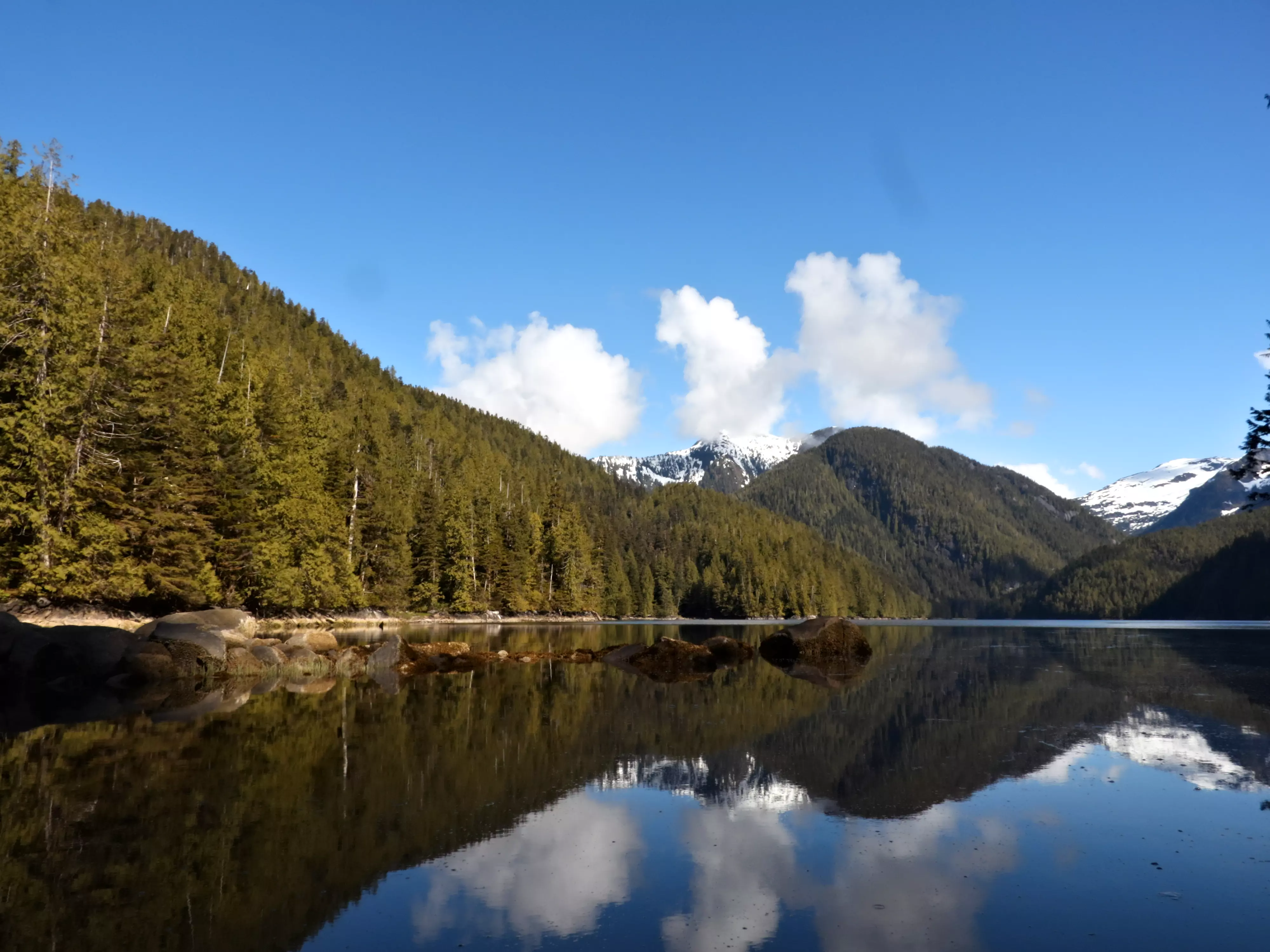
- Klewnuggit Inlet Marine Park

- Location within British Columbia
- Interactive map of Klewnuggit Inlet Marine Provincial Park
- Location: British Columbia, Canada
- Nearest city: Prince Rupert, BC
- Coordinates: 53°41′09″N 129°42′06″W
- Area: 1,800 hectares (4,400 acres)
- Established: 14 June 1993
- Governing body: BC Parks

Klewnuggit Inlet Marine Provincial Park is a provincial park in British Columbia, Canada, located on the east side of Grenville Channel, 100 kilometres (62 miles) southeast of Prince Rupert, in the Range 4 Coast Land District.

The park was established on 14 June 1993, surrounds the inlet and Freda Lake, and covers 1,800 hectares (4,400 acres), including 1,508 hectares (3,730 acres) of upland and 292 hectares (720 acres) of foreshore.

== Images ==
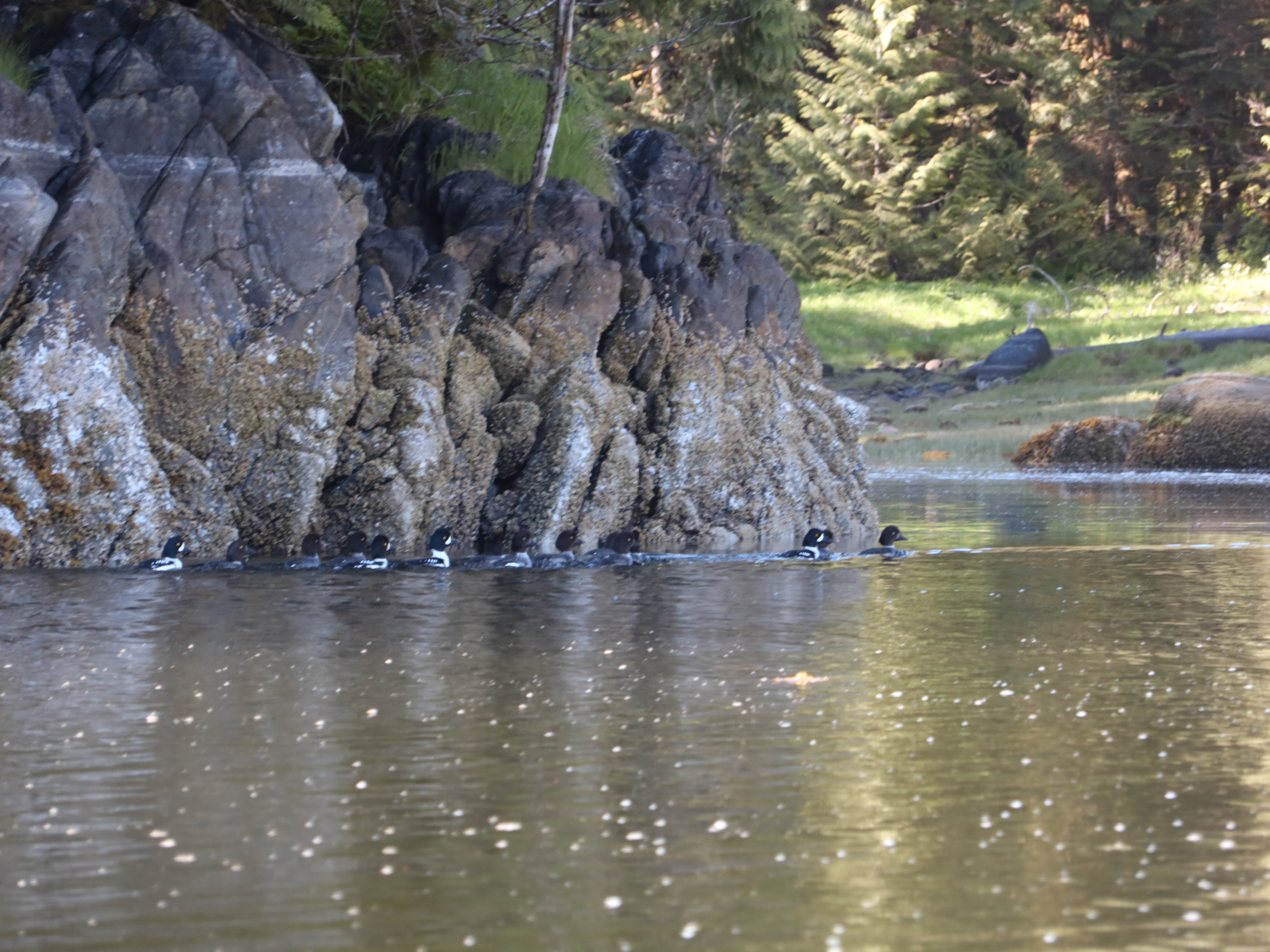
Flock of Barrow's goldeneyes foraging

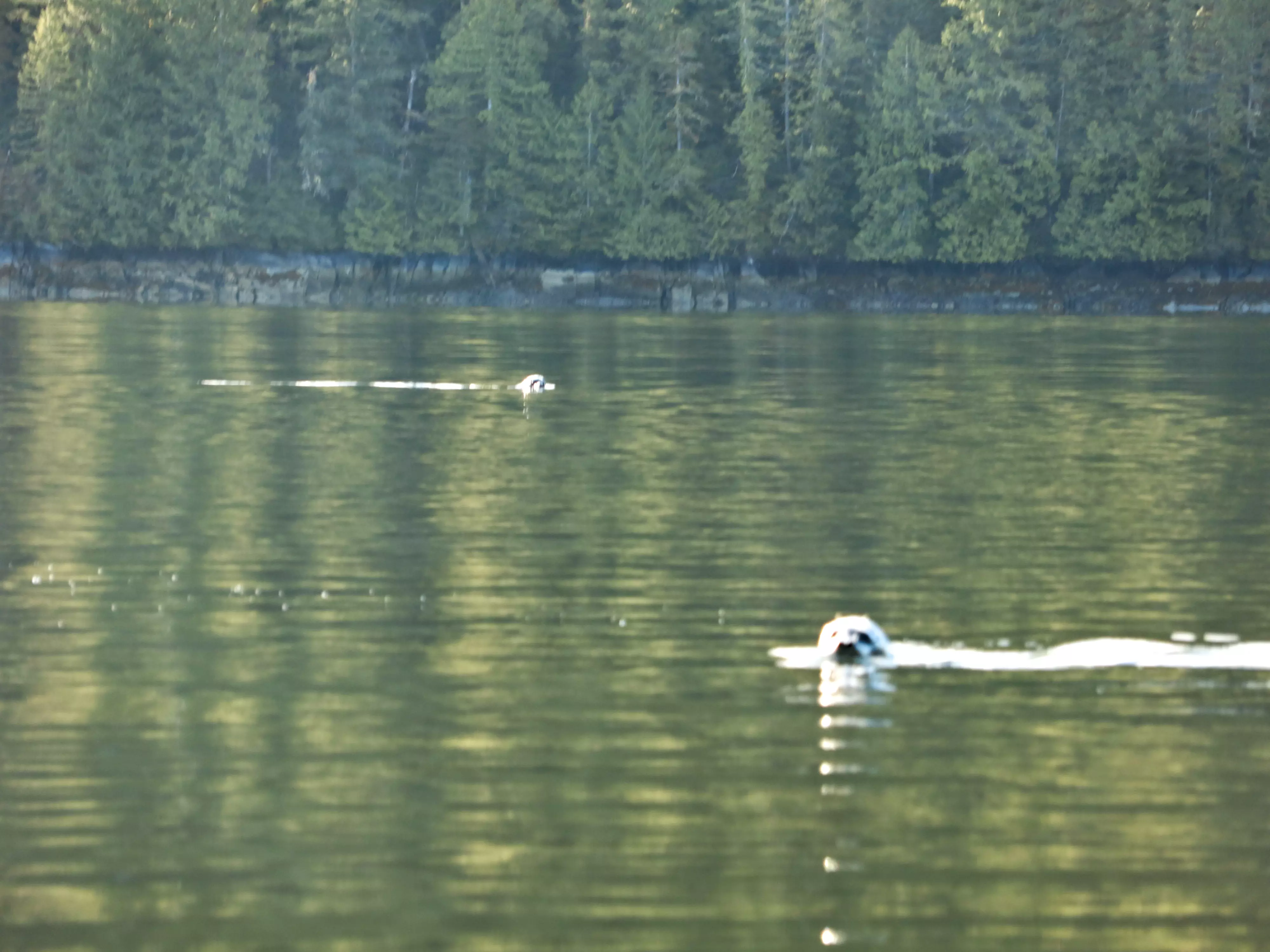
Curious Harbour Seals

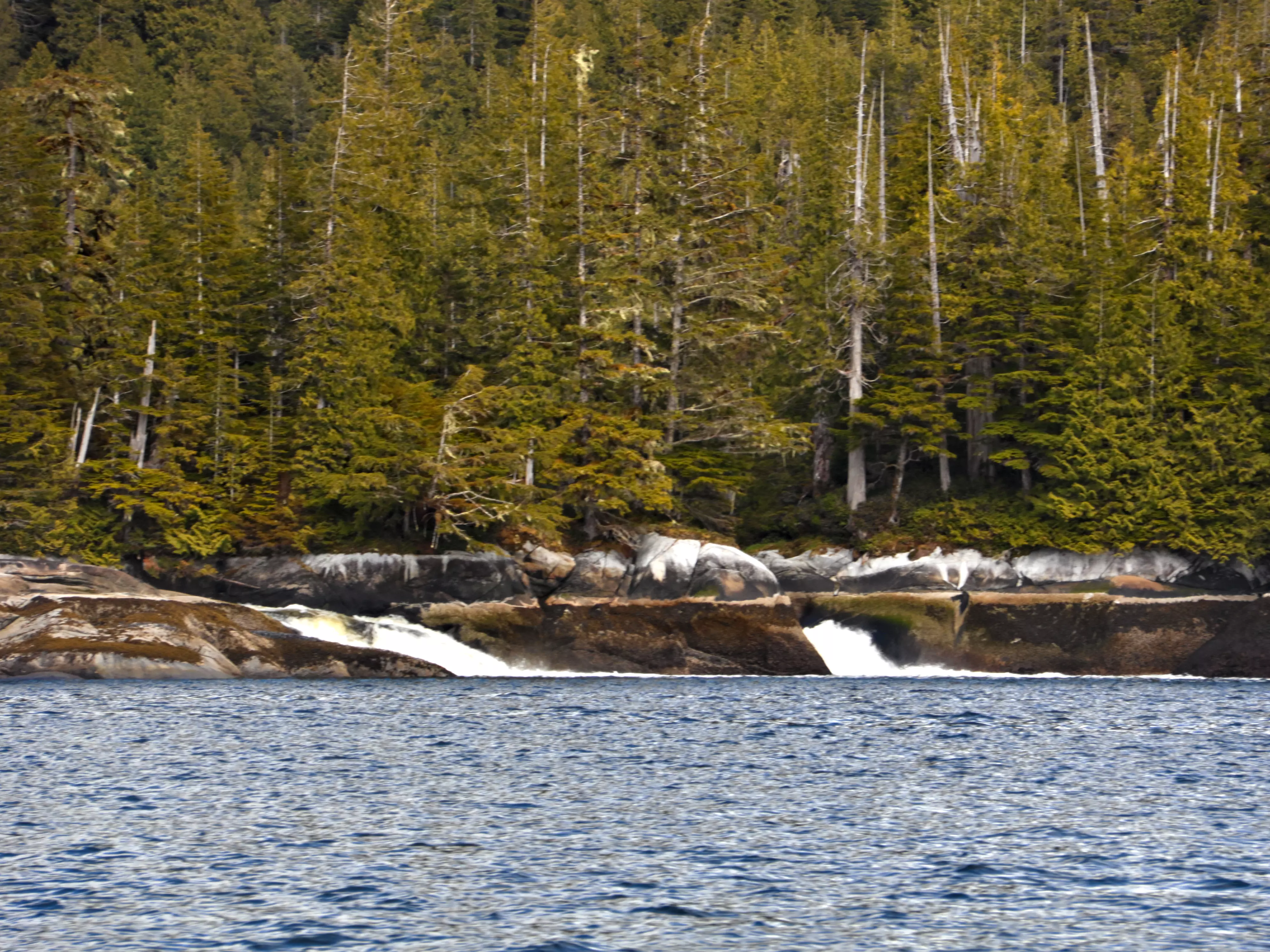
Brodie Lake falls into the inlet

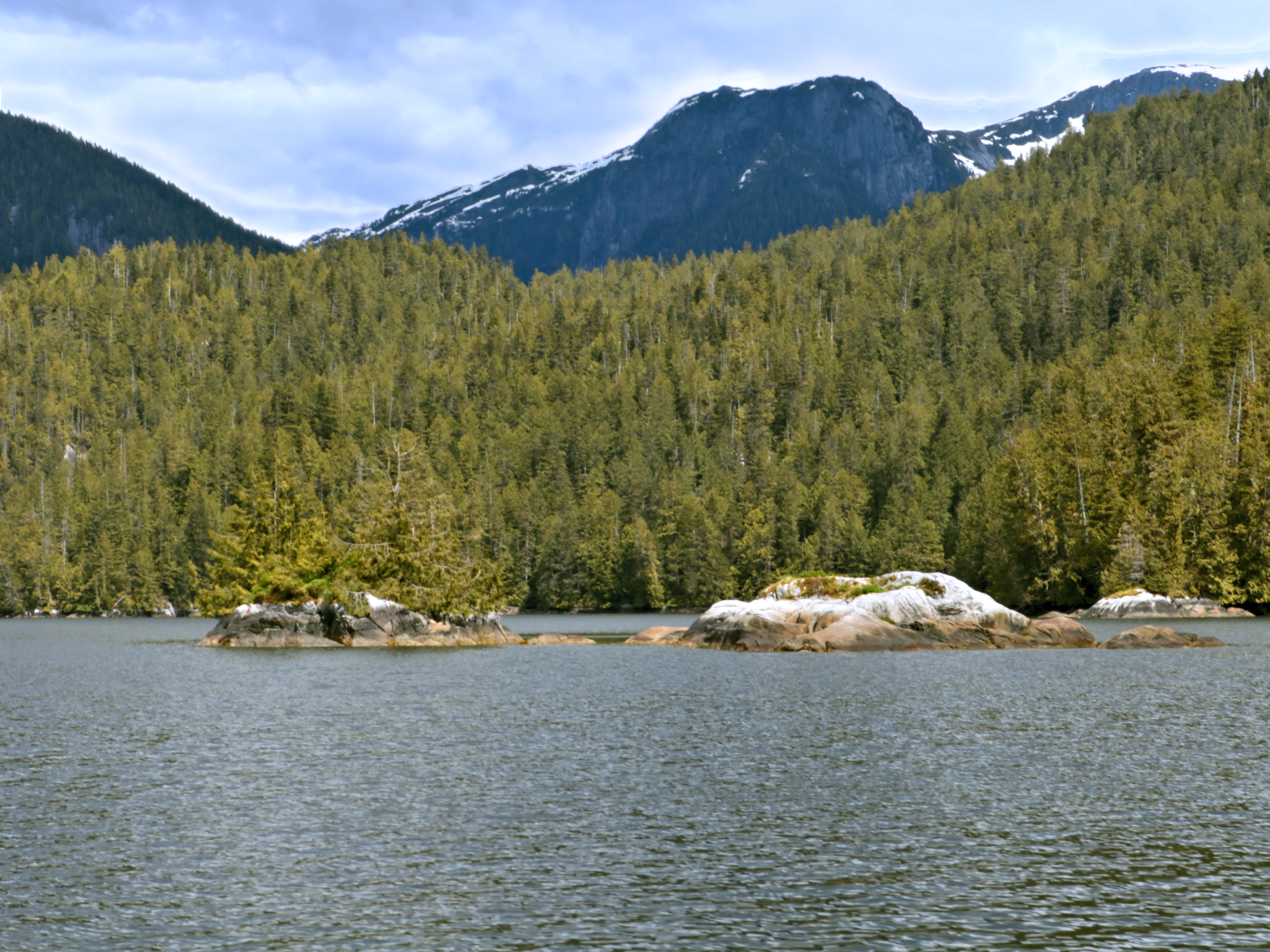
Islets in the East Finger
