= Abiotic stress =

Stress on organisms caused by nonliving factors

Abiotic stress is the negative impact of non-living factors on the living organisms in a specific environment. The non-living variable must influence the environment beyond its normal range of variation to adversely affect the population performance or individual physiology of the organism in a significant way.

Whereas a biotic stress would include living disturbances such as fungi or harmful insects, abiotic stress factors, or stressors, are naturally occurring, often intangible and inanimate factors such as intense sunlight, temperature or wind that may cause harm to the plants and animals in the area affected. Abiotic stress is essentially unavoidable. Abiotic stress affects animals, but plants are especially dependent, if not solely dependent, on environmental factors, so it is particularly constraining. Abiotic stress is the most harmful factor concerning the growth and productivity of crops worldwide. Research has also shown that abiotic stressors are at their most harmful when they occur together, in combinations of abiotic stress factors.

== Examples ==
Abiotic stress comes in many forms. The most common of the stressors are the easiest for people to identify, but there are many other, less recognizable abiotic stress factors which affect environments constantly.

The most basic stressors include:

- High winds
- Extreme temperatures
- Drought
- Flood
- Other natural disasters, such as tornadoes and wildfires.
- Cold
- Heat
- Nutrient deficiency

Lesser-known stressors generally occur on a smaller scale. They include: poor edaphic conditions like rock content and pH levels, high radiation, compaction, contamination, and other, highly specific conditions like rapid rehydration during seed germination.

== Effects ==
Abiotic stress, as a natural part of every ecosystem, will affect organisms in a variety of ways. Although these effects may be either beneficial or detrimental, the location of the area is crucial in determining the extent of the impact that abiotic stress will have. The higher the latitude of the area affected, the greater the impact of abiotic stress will be on that area. So, a taiga or boreal forest is at the mercy of whatever abiotic stress factors may come along, while tropical zones are much less susceptible to such stressors.

=== Benefits ===
While abiotic stress may have negative impacts on individual organisms, there are cases where abiotic stress plays an important role in maintaining a healthy ecosystem. Important ecosystem mechanisms and improved overall stress tolerance may rely on occasional low levels of abiotic stress.

One example of a situation where abiotic stress plays a constructive role in an ecosystem is in natural wildfires. Smaller fires are useful in reducing the overall fuel load of an area of forest or prairie. By clearing out dead brush and other organic matter, the risk of catastrophic and widespread fire decreases, and the residual ash of smaller fires helps add nutrients back into the soil. The observed benefits of these smaller and more controlled fires on land usability and species populations have led to the use of prescribed burning by humans for centuries. Varying perspectives on the benefits and risks of fire to ecosystems have influenced official policy through history. The U.S. Forest Service, initially focused on fire control, changed its policy to one of fire management in 1974, recognizing these fires as a natural part of an ecosystem. There is also evidence that a diverse fire history between patches of land within an area has been shown to benefit transitional landscapes between savanna and forest. Even though it is healthy for an ecosystem, a wildfire can still be considered an abiotic stressor, because it puts stress on individual organisms within the area. On the larger scale, though, natural wildfires are positive manifestations of abiotic stress.

What also needs to be taken into account when looking for benefits of abiotic stress, is that one phenomenon may not affect an entire ecosystem in the same way. While a flood will kill most plants living low on the ground in a certain area, if there is rice there, it will thrive in the wet conditions. Another example of this is in phytoplankton and zooplankton. The same types of conditions are usually considered stressful for these two types of organisms. They act very similarly when exposed to ultraviolet light and most toxins, but at elevated temperatures the phytoplankton reacts negatively, while the thermophilic zooplankton reacts positively to the increase in temperature. The two may be living in the same environment, but an increase in temperature of the area would prove stressful only for one of the organisms.

Lastly, abiotic stress has enabled species to grow, develop, and evolve, through the process of natural selection. Heritable traits that improve an organism's resiliency under stressed conditions increase the likelihood that the organism will survive and reproduce, enabling it to pass these traits to the next generation. Both plants and animals have evolved mechanisms allowing them to survive extremes.

=== Detriments ===
One of the detriments concerning abiotic stress involves farming. It has been claimed by one study that abiotic stress causes the most crop loss of any other factor and that most major crops are reduced in their yield by more than 50% from their potential yield.

Because abiotic stress is widely considered a detrimental effect, the research on this branch of the issue is extensive. For more information on the harmful effects of abiotic stress, see the sections below on plants and animals.

== In plants ==
A plant's first line of defense against abiotic stress is in its roots. If the soil holding the plant is healthy and biologically diverse, the plant will have a higher chance of surviving stressful conditions.

The plant responses to stress are dependent on the tissue or organ affected by the stress. For example, transcriptional responses to stress are tissue or cell specific in roots and are quite different depending on the stress involved.

One of the primary responses to abiotic stress such as high salinity is the disruption of the Na+/K+ ratio in the cytoplasm of the plant cell. High concentrations of Na+, for example, can decrease the capacity for the plant to take up water and also alter enzyme and transporter functions. Evolved adaptations to efficiently restore cellular ion homeostasis have led to a wide variety of stress tolerant plants.

Facilitation, or the positive interactions between different species of plants, is an intricate web of association in a natural environment. It is how plants work together. In areas of high stress, the level of facilitation is especially high as well. This could possibly be because the plants need a stronger network to survive in a harsher environment, so their interactions between species, such as cross-pollination or mutualistic actions, become more common to cope with the severity of their habitat.

Plants also adapt very differently from one another, even from a plant living in the same area. When a group of different plant species was prompted by a variety of different stress signals, such as drought or cold, each plant responded uniquely. Hardly any of the responses were similar, even though the plants had become accustomed to exactly the same home environment.

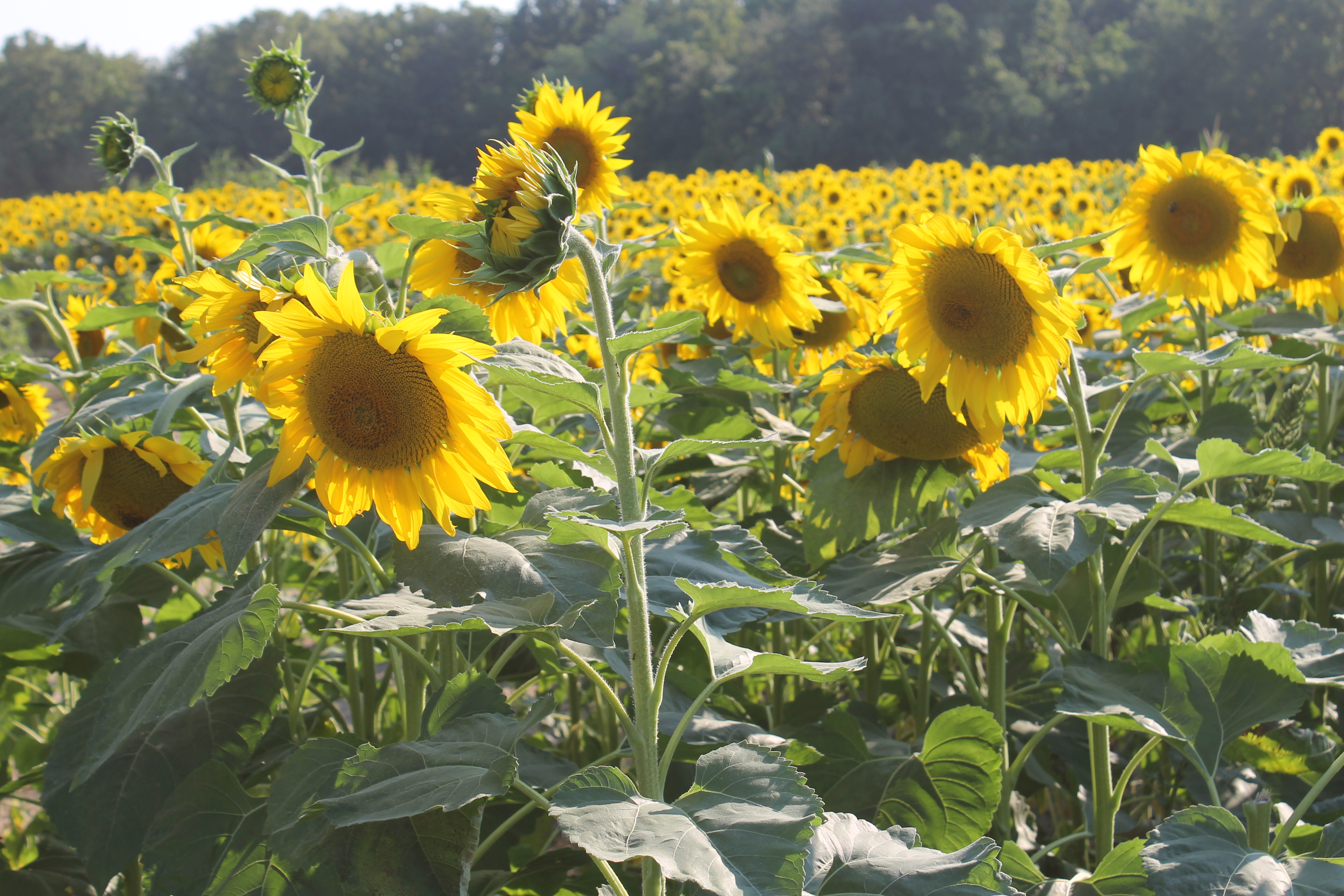
Sunflowers are hyperaccumulator plants that can absorb large amount of metal.

Serpentine soils (media with low concentrations of nutrients and high concentrations of heavy metals) can be a source of abiotic stress. Initially, the absorption of toxic metal ions is limited by cell membrane exclusion. Ions that are absorbed into tissues are sequestered in cell vacuoles. This sequestration mechanism is facilitated by proteins on the vacuole membrane. An example of plants that adapt to serpentine soil are Metallophytes, or hyperaccumulators, as they are known for their ability to absorbed heavy metals using the root-to-shoot translocation (which it will absorb into shoots rather than the plant itself). They're also extinguished for their ability to absorb toxic substances from heavy metals.

Chemical priming has been proposed to increase tolerance to abiotic stresses in crop plants. In this method, which is analogous to vaccination, stress-inducing chemical agents are introduced to the plant in brief doses so that the plant begins preparing defense mechanisms. Thus, when the abiotic stress occurs, the plant has already prepared defense mechanisms that can be activated faster and increase tolerance. Prior exposure to tolerable doses of biotic stresses such as phloem-feeding insect infestation have also been shown to increase tolerance to abiotic stresses in plant

=== Impact on food production ===
Abiotic stress mostly affects plants used in agriculture. Some examples of adverse conditions (which may be caused by climate change) are high or low temperatures, drought, salinity, and toxins.

- Rice (Oryza sativa) is a classic example. It serves as the primary staple food for the vast majority of Asian countries, heavily dominating diets across East Asia, South Asia, and Southeast Asia. However, these plants are highly vulnerable to various abiotic stresses, such as severe drought, flooding, salinity, heat stress, and acid soils which adversely affect global production. To combat this, genetic diversity among several rice varieties with different genotypes has been extensively studied using molecular markers.
- Chickpea production is affected by drought. Chickpeas are one of the most important foods in the world.
- Wheat is another major crop that is affected by drought: lack of water affects the plant development, and can wither the leaves.
- Maize crops can be affected by high temperature and drought, leading to the loss of maize crops due to poor plant development.
- Soybean is a major source of protein, and its production is also affected by drought.

=== Heat stress ===
Elevated global temperatures present a severe bottleneck for crop yields, as heat stress alters membrane fluidity, accelerates destructive transpiration rates, and heavily impairs a plant's overall Water Use Efficiency (WUE). When crops encounter extreme thermal environments during early reproductive or vegetative stages, cellular homeostasis is broken down, causing grain yield reduction and premature leaf senescence. To mitigate down-stream damage from overlapping thermal and drought shocks, advanced ex-ante strategies such as physical seed priming or chemical priming agents are applied. These priming interventions activate early molecular, enzymatic, and hormonal pre-defense responses within the seed tissue, enabling the plant to maintain higher functional stability and lower oxidative injury when heat stress occurs later in the field environment.

=== Flooding (submergence and waterlogging) ===
Flooding acts as a compound environmental stressor that is broadly categorized into waterlogging (where only the root system is inundated) and complete submergence (where the entire plant is covered by water). The primary hazard of flooding is gas diffusion restriction, which triggers oxygen starvation (hypoxia or anoxia) in the rhizosphere and alters essential plant hormone signaling networks, such as the regulation between Sub1A and non-Sub1A genotypes in rice. To cope with complete submergence, tolerant plants rely on distinct physiological survival strategies. Research demonstrates that survival depends on the rapid translocation of pre-existing non-structural carbohydrates (such as starch and soluble sugars) to support vital metabolic maintenance and restrict passive shoot elongation, rather than relying on active de novo carbon assimilation during the flooding period. Furthermore, monitoring maximum quantum yield performance reveals that preserving photosynthetic efficiency during transient flooding stress is paramount to driving rapid physiological recovery once the water recedes.

=== Acid soils ===
Soil acidity acts as a sweeping abiotic stress factor on global arable lands, primarily because low pH environments trigger dangerous chemical toxicities dominated by soluble aluminum (Al^{3+})and iron, which structurally damage root anatomy and limit basic development. High acidity also locks up vital macronutrients, causing severe phosphorus starvation stress that forces plants to aggressively modify their lateral root structures to maximize surface area absorption. To remediate heavy-metal-polluted and highly acidic substrates, bioremediation utilizes hyperaccumulator plant traits (metallophytes). These specialized plants successfully survive the toxicity of acidic media by relying on a highly developed root-to-shoot translocation system, which efficiently absorbs and transports toxic ions away from fragile root tissues and sequesters them safely inside the upper shoot vacuoles.

=== Salt stress in plants ===
Soil salinization, the accumulation of water-soluble salts to levels that negatively impact plant production, is a global phenomenon affecting approximately 831 million hectares of land. More specifically, the phenomenon threatens 19.5% of the world's irrigated agricultural land and 2.1% of the world's non-irrigated (dry-land) agricultural lands. High soil salinity content can be harmful to plants because water-soluble salts can alter osmotic potential gradients and consequently inhibit many cellular functions. For example, high soil salinity content can inhibit the process of photosynthesis by limiting a plant's water uptake; high levels of water-soluble salts in the soil can decrease the osmotic potential of the soil and consequently decrease the difference in water potential between the soil and the plant's roots, thereby limiting electron flow from H_{2}O to P680 in Photosystem II's reaction center.

Over generations, many plants have mutated and built different mechanisms to counter salinity effects. A good combatant of salinity in plants is the hormone ethylene. Ethylene is known for regulating plant growth and development and dealing with stress conditions. Many central membrane proteins in plants, such as ETO2, ERS1 and EIN2, are used for ethylene signaling in many plant growth processes. Mutations in these proteins can lead to heightened salt sensitivity and can limit plant growth. The effects of salinity has been studied on Arabidopsis plants that have mutated ERS1, ERS2, ETR1, ETR2 and EIN4 proteins. These proteins are used for ethylene signaling against certain stress conditions, such as salt and the ethylene precursor ACC is used to suppress any sensitivity to the salt stress.

=== Phosphate starvation in plants ===
Phosphorus (P) is an essential macronutrient required for plant growth and development, but it is present only in limited quantities in most of the world's soil. Plants use P mainly in the form of soluble inorganic phosphates (PO_{4}^{−−−}) but are subject to abiotic stress when there is not enough soluble PO_{4}^{−−−} in the soil. Phosphorus forms insoluble complexes with Ca and Mg in alkaline soils and with Al and Fe in acidic soils that make the phosphorus unavailable for plant roots. When there is limited bioavailable P in the soil, plants show extensive symptoms of abiotic stress, such as short primary roots and more lateral roots and root hairs to make more surface available for phosphate absorption, exudation of organic acids and phosphatase to release phosphates from complex P–containing molecules and make it available for growing plants' organs. It has been shown that PHR1, a MYB-related transcription factor, is a master regulator of P-starvation response in plants. PHR1 also has been shown to regulate extensive remodeling of lipids and metabolites during phosphorus limitation stress

=== Drought stress ===
Drought stress, defined as naturally occurring water deficit, is a main cause of crop losses in agriculture. This is because water is essential for many fundamental processes in plant growth. It has become especially important in recent years to find a way to combat drought stress. A decrease in precipitation and consequent increase in drought are extremely likely in the future due to an increase in global warming. Plants have come up with many mechanisms and adaptations to try and deal with drought stress. One of the leading ways that plants combat drought stress is by closing their stomata. A key hormone regulating stomatal opening and closing is abscisic acid (ABA). Synthesis of ABA causes the ABA to bind to receptors. This binding then affects the opening of ion channels, thereby decreasing turgor pressure in the stomata and causing them to close. Recent studies by Gonzalez-Villagra, et al., have shown how ABA levels increased in drought-stressed plants (2018). They showed that when plants were placed in a stressful situation, they produced more ABA to try to conserve any water they had in their leaves. Another extremely important factor in dealing with drought stress and regulating the uptake and export of water is aquaporins (AQPs). AQPs are integral membrane proteins that make up channels. These channels' main job is the transport of water and other essential solutes. AQPs are both transcriptionally and post-transcriptionally regulated by many different factors such as ABA, GA3, pH and Ca^{2+}; and the specific levels of AQPs in certain parts of the plant, such as roots or leaves, helps to draw as much water into the plant as possible. By understanding the mechanisms of both AQPs and the hormone ABA, scientists will be better able to produce drought-resistant plants in the future.

A study by Tombesi et al., found that plants which had previously been exposed to drought were able to minimize water loss and decrease water use. They found that plants which were exposed to drought conditions actually changed the way they regulated their stomata and what they called "hydraulic safety margin" so as to decrease the vulnerability of the plant. By changing the regulation of stomata and subsequently the transpiration, plants were able to function better when less water was available.

== In animals ==
For animals, the most stressful of all the abiotic stressors is heat. This is because many species are unable to regulate their internal body temperature. Even in the species that are able to regulate their own temperature, it is not always a completely accurate system. Temperature determines metabolic rates, heart rates, and other very important factors within the bodies of animals, so an extreme temperature change can easily distress the animal's body. Animals can respond to extreme heat, for example, through natural heat acclimation or by burrowing into the ground to find a cooler space.

It is also possible to see in animals that a high genetic diversity is beneficial in providing resiliency against harsh abiotic stressors. This acts as a sort of stock room when a species is plagued by the perils of natural selection. A variety of galling insects are among the most specialized and diverse herbivores on the planet, and their extensive protections against abiotic stress factors have helped the insect in gaining that position of honor.

== In endangered species ==
Biodiversity is determined by many things, and one of them is abiotic stress. If an environment is highly stressful, biodiversity tends to be low. If abiotic stress does not have a strong presence in an area, the biodiversity will be much higher.

This idea leads into the understanding of how abiotic stress and endangered species are related. It has been observed through a variety of environments that as the level of abiotic stress increases, the number of species decreases. This means that species are more likely to become population threatened, endangered, and even extinct, when and where abiotic stress is especially harsh.

== Effects of anthropogenic climate change on abiotic stress ==
Data suggests that anthropogenic activity has increased the global temperature, and likely increased the odds of extreme climate events such as drought, fire conditions and flooding. Threats to organisms and ecosystem biodiversity due to increased abiotic stress are one major impact of this change. The effects of climate change on biomes vary due to the location, patterns of precipitation, and the organisms which inhabit them. On the species level, the increased abiotic stress due to climate change can lead to adaptations which increase a species' reproductive success under these conditions. However, such highly specialized adaptations may leave species vulnerable to other stresses.

== See also ==
- Ecophysiology
- Natural stress
