= Baker Inlet =

Inlet in British Columbia

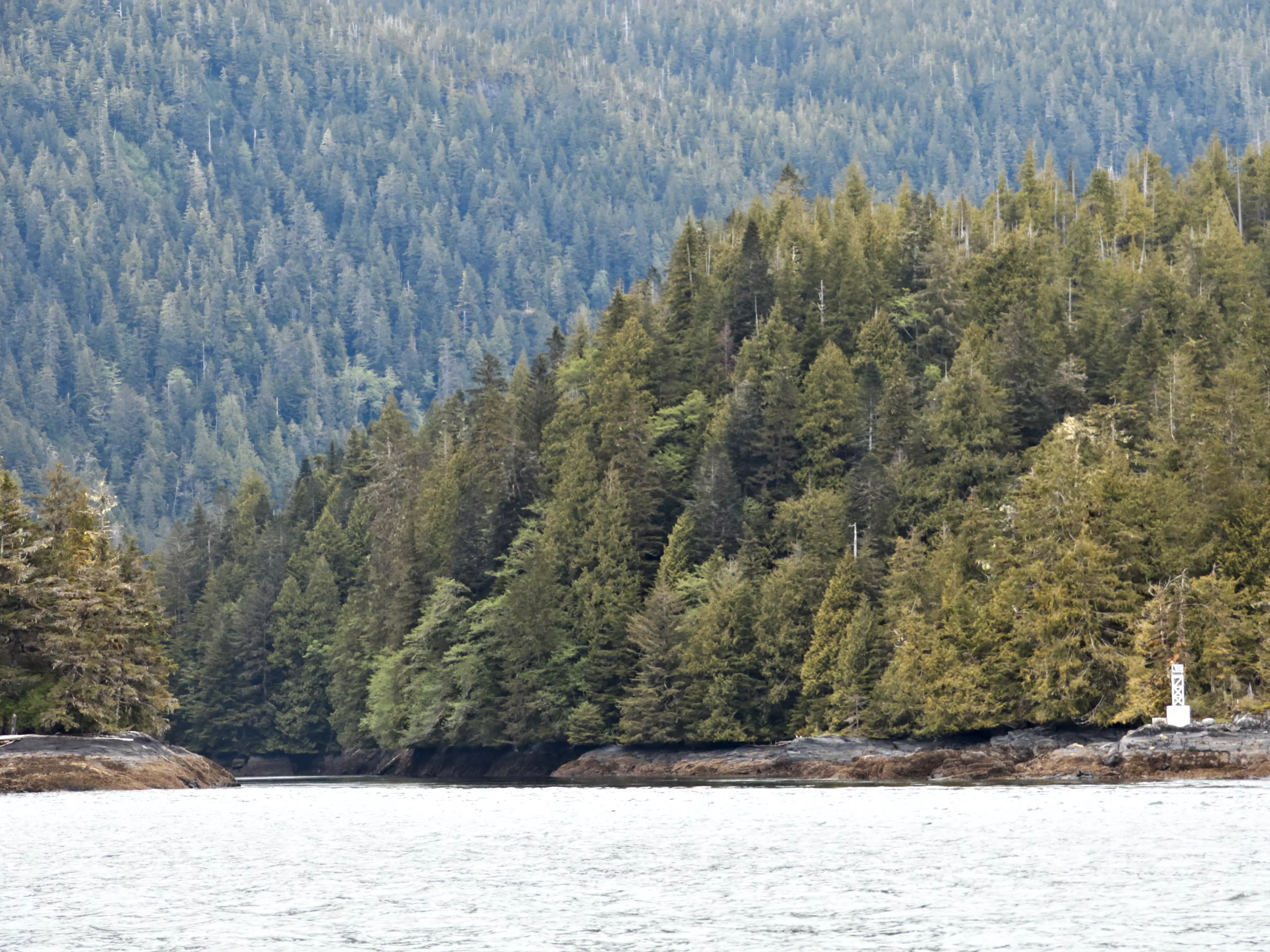
- Baker Inlet

- Location in British Columbia
- Location: North Coast RD, British Columbia
- Coordinates: 53°48′59″N 129°54′02″W
- Type: Inlet
- Ocean/sea sources: Pacific Ocean

Baker Inlet is an inlet in the North Coast region of British Columbia, Canada, extending east from Grenville Channel opposite Pitt Island, to the south of Kumealon Inlet.

== See also ==
- Grenville Channel
- Inside Passage
- Kumealon Inlet
