= Natural stress =

In regard to agriculture, Abiotic stress is stress produced by natural environment factors such as extreme temperatures, wind, drought, and salinity. Humankind doesn't have much control over abiotic stresses. It is very important for humans to understand how stress factors affect plants and other living things so that we can take some preventative measures.

Preventative measures are the only way that humans can protect themselves and their possessions from abiotic stress. There are many different types of abiotic stressors, and several methods that humans can use to reduce the negative effects of stress on living things.

== Cold ==
One of the types of Abiotic Stress is cold. This has a huge impact on farmers. Cold impacts crop growers all over the world in every single country. Yields suffer and farmers also suffer huge losses because the weather is just too cold to produce crops (Xiong & Zhu, 2001).

Humans have planned the planting of our crops around the seasons. Even though the seasons are fairly predictable, there are always unexpected storms, heat waves, or cold snaps that can ruin our growing seasons.(Suzuki & Mittler, 2006)

ROS stands for reactive oxygen species. ROS plays a large role in mediating events through transduction. Cold stress was shown to enhance the transcript, protein, and activity of different ROS-scavenging enzymes. Low temperature stress has also been shown to increase the H_{2}O_{2} accumulation in cells.(Suzuki & Mittler, 2006)

Plants can be acclimated to low or even freezing temperatures. If a plant can go through a mild cold spell this activates the cold-responsive genes in the plant. Then if the temperature drops again, the genes will have conditioned the plant to cope with the low temperature. Even below freezing temperatures can be survived if the proper genes are activated (Suzuki & Mittler, 2006).

== Heat ==
Heat stress has been shown to cause problems in mitochondrial functions and can result in oxidative damage. Activators of heat stress receptors and defenses are thought to be related to ROS. Heat is another thing that plants can deal with if they have the proper pretreatment. This means that if the temperature gradually warms up the plants are going to be better able to cope with the change. A sudden long temperature increase could cause damage to the plant because their cells and receptors haven't had enough time to prepare for a major temperature change.

Heat stress can also have a detrimental effect on plant reproduction. Temperatures 10 degrees Celsius or more above normal growing temperatures can have a bad effect on several plant reproductive functions. Pollen meiosis, pollen germination, ovule development, ovule viability, development of the embryo, and seedling growth are all aspects of plant reproduction that are affected by heat.(Cross, McKay, McHughen, & Bonham-Smith, 2003)

There have been many studies on the effects of heat on plant reproduction. One study on plants was conducted on Canola plants at 28 degrees Celsius, the result was decreased plant size, but the plants were still fertile. Another experiment was conducted on Canola plants at 32 degrees Celsius, this resulted in the production of sterile plants. Plants seem to be more easily damaged by extreme temperatures during the late flower to early seed development stage (Cross, McKay, McHughen, & Bonham-Smith, 2003).

== Wind ==
Wind is a huge part of abiotic stress. There is simply no way to stop the wind from blowing. This is definitely a bigger problem in some parts of the world than in others. Barren areas such as deserts are very susceptible to natural wind erosion. These types of areas don't have any vegetation to hold the soil particles in place. Once the wind starts to blow the soil around, there is nothing to stop the process. The only chance for the soil to stay in place is if the wind doesn't blow. This is usually not an option.

Plant growth in windblown areas is very limited. Because the soil is constantly moving, there is no opportunity for plants to develop a root system. Soil that blows a lot usually is very dry also. This leaves little nutrients to promote plant growth.

Farmland is typically very susceptible to wind erosion. Most farmers do not plant cover crops during the seasons when their main crops are not in the fields. They simply leave the ground open and uncovered. When the soil is dry, the top layer becomes similar to powder. When the wind blows, the powdery top layer of the farmland is picked up and carried for miles. This is the exact scenario that occurred during the “dust bowl” in the 1930s. The combination of drought and poor farming practices allowed the wind to moves thousands of tons of dirt from one area to the next.

Wind is one of the factors that humans can really have some control over. Simply practice good farming practices. Don't leave ground bare and without any type of vegetation. During dry seasons it is especially important to have the land covered because dry soil moves much easier than wet soil in the wind.

When soil is not blowing due to the wind, conditions are much better for plant growth. Plants cannot grow in a soil that is constantly blowing. Their root systems do not have time to be established. Also, when soil particles are blowing they wear away at the plants that they run into. Plants are essentially “sand blasted.”

== Drought ==
Drought is very detrimental to all types of plant growth. When there is no water in the soil there are not very many nutrients to support plant growth. Drought also enhances the effects of wind. When drought occurs the soil becomes very dry and light. The wind picks up this dry dirt and carries it away. This action severely degrades the soil and creates a poor condition for growing plants.

== Adaptation of plants ==
Plants have been exposed to the elements for thousands of years. During this time they have evolved in order to lessen the effects of abiotic stress. Signal transduction is the mechanism in plants that is responsible for the adaptation of plants (Xiong & Zhu, 2001). Many signaling transduction networks have been discovered and studied in microbial and animal systems. There is limited knowledge in the plant field because it is very difficult to find exactly which phenotypes in the plant are affected by stressors. These phenotypes are very valuable to the researchers. They need to know the phenotypes so that they can create a method to screen for mutant genes. Mutants are the key to finding signaling pathways in living creatures.

Animals and microbes easier to run tests on because they show a reaction fairly quickly when a stress factor is put on them, this leads to the isolation of the specific gene. There have been decades of research on the effects of temperature, drought, and salinity, but not very many answers.

== Receptors ==
The part of the plants, animal, or microbe that first senses an abiotic stress factor is a receptor. Once a signal is picked up by a receptor, signals are transmitted intercellularly and then they activate nuclear transcription to get the effects of a certain set of genes. These activated genes allow the plant to respond to the stress that it is experiencing. Even though none of the receptors for cold, drought, salinity or the stress hormone abscisic acid in plants is known for sure, the knowledge that we have today shows that receptor-like protein kinases, two-component histidine kinases, as well as G-protein receptors may be the possible sensors of these different signals.

Receptor like kinases can be found in plants as well as animals. There are many more RLKs in plants than there are in animals. They are also a little bit different. Unlike animal RLKs that usually possess tyrosine signature sequences, plant RLKs have serine or threonine signature sequences (Xiong & Zhu, 2001).

== Genetically Modified Plants ==
Plants are most commonly modified to be resistant to specific herbicides or pathogens, but we have the technology to modify plants in order to make them resistant to specific abiotic stressors. Cold, heat, drought, or salt are all factors that could possibly be defended against by genetically modified plants.

Some plants could have genes added to them from other species of plants that have a resistance to a specific stress. Plants implanted with these genes would then become transgenic plants because they have the genes from another species of plant in them. Scientists first have to isolate the specific gene in a plant that is responsible for its resistance. The gene would then be taken out of the plant and put into another plant. The plant that is injected with the new resistant gene would have a resistance to an abiotic stressor and be able to tolerate a wider range of conditions (Weil, 2005).

This process of creating transgenic plants could have a huge impact on our nation's economy. If plants could be genetically engineered to be resistant to a wider variety of stress, crop yields would skyrocket. With the expansion of town and cities there is a decreasing number of farm acres. Although the farm acres are being built on, the number of people consuming agriculture products is going up. Ethanol is also responsible for using much more of the corn that is grown here in the U.S. The production of this fuel has put a strain on the corn market. Prices of corn have gone up and this price is having a negative impact on the people who feed animals using corn. The combination of reduced acres of farmland and a higher demand on crops have left producers and consumers in a severe dilemma. The only solution to this problem is to keep getting higher and higher yields from the cropland that we have left.

Genetically modified plants are a good answer to the problem of not enough crops to go around. These plants can be engineered to be resistant to all types of abiotic stress. This would eliminate crop yield loss due to extreme temperatures, drought, wind, or salinity. The consumers of crops would enjoy a little bit lower prices because the demand on them would be a little lower.

The Midwestern U.S. is experiencing a severe drought. Farmers are being limited on how much they can irrigate due to the shortage of water. There is also very little rain during the growing season so the crops do not yield very well. This problem could be solved by genetically modifying plants to become more drought resistant. If plants could use less water and produce yields that are superior or equal to current ones, it would be better for the people and also the environment. People would enjoy an abundance of crops to consume and export for a profit. The environment would be able to have more water in its aquifers and rivers throughout the country.

Another environmental factor that would be improved would be the amount of land left for wildlife. Crops modified to be resistant to abiotic stress and other factors that decrease yields would require less land use. Producers would be able to grow enough crops on less acres if the plants were modified to produce very high yields. This would allow some of the cropland that is in use today to be set aside for wildlife. Instead of farming “fence line to fence line” farmers would be able to create large buffers in their fields. These buffers would provide a great habitat for plants and animals.

A lot of people do not like genetically modified organisms. People opposed to these modified plants often claim that they are not safe for the environment or for human consumption. There are many videos and reports in circulation that discredit the safety of genetically modified organisms. King Corn is one video that claims that corn is bad for humans to consume.

There are strict regulations and protocols that go along with genetically modifying plants. A company that specializes in producing genetically modifying organisms must put their plants through a huge variety of tests to ensure the safety of their product. Each of these tests must be passed by the product in order to produce more of the plant seeds.

When seeds are mass-produced, the fields that they are grown in have to meet specific criteria. They must have no vegetation zones around them to prevent the spread of the modified plants into the native population. The plots must be carefully labeled and marked so that the company knows exactly what is planted in the field. All of these protocols are in place to ensure the safety of the consumers and also of the environment. Because genetically modified plants are given stress resistant genes or high yielding genes they are better for the environment. They only help create more land to be put back into natural habitats for plants and animals.

== Conclusion ==
Abiotic stress is a naturally occurring factor that cannot be controlled by humans. One example of two stressors that are complementary to each other is wind and drought. Drought dries out the soil and kills the plants that are growing in the soil. After this occurs, the soil is left barren and dry. Wind can pick up the soil and carry for miles. Irrigation can keep this from happening, but it is not possible to irrigate some areas.

Genetically modified plants can be implemented to slow down the effects of the abiotic stressors. This allows more crops to be grown on a smaller amount of land. Less need for farmland allows some of it to be set aside for natural wildlife habitat.

Abiotic stress only poses a problem to people or the environment if they are not prepared for it. There can be steps taken by humans to lessen the effects. Plants and animals have the ability to adapt to abiotic stress over time.
