= Union Passage Marine Provincial Park =

Provincial park in British Columbia, Canada

- Location within British Columbia
- Interactive map of Union Passage Marine Provincial Park
- Nearest city: Prince Rupert
- Coordinates: 53°24′45″N 129°26′30″W
- Area: 1,373 ha (5.30 sq mi)
- Established: June 14, 1993
- Operator: BC Parks

Union Passage Marine Provincial Park is a provincial park within the asserted traditional territory of the Tsimshian First Nations. The marine protected area is located at the southwest end of Grenville Channel straddling Pitt and Farrant Islands, in British Columbia, Canada.

== Conservation ==
The park conserves 395 hectares (980 acres) of North Coast Fjords Marine Ecosection, and protects sensitive aquatic habitats of importance for harbour porpoises, orca, humpback whales, Pacific white-sided dolphins, Dall's porpoises, and Harbour seals.
