= Important ecological areas =

Important ecological areas (IEAs) are areas that contribute to local or larger ecosystem health, or that are unique or sensitive ecosystems. This term is most commonly used as a descriptive category (rather than a formal designation) in environmental planning, environmental assessment, and nature conservation literature.

Appropriate management of key ecological features delineates the management boundaries of an IEA. The identification and protection of IEAs is an element of an ecosystem-based management approach, and may have varying levels of management of extractive activities, from monitoring up to and including marine reserve. IEAs have management measures tailored to the ecological features within the area with consideration of socioeconomic factors. Whereas marine reserves generally have a fixed management policy of no extraction or ‘no-take’. Nonetheless, a marine reserve may be the appropriate management policy for an IEA.

The identification and management of IEAs is a form of ocean zoning. In the event that there are a series of linked IEAs within a large marine ecosystem, a collective action to manage the network, such as a marine sanctuary or national monument, may be warranted.

Examples are tropical rainforests, oceans, forests, etc.

== International equivalents ==
Different countries and international frameworks use other terms for areas of ecological importance:

United Kingdom
Local Wildlife Sites
Canada
Ecologically and Biologically Significant Areas (EBSAs)
Australia
Matters of National Environmental Significance (MNES)
