= Alert =

Alert or ALERT may refer to:

- Alertness, the state of active attention by high sensory awareness.

== Places ==
- Alert, Iran
- Alert, Indiana, U.S.
- Alert, North Carolina, U.S.
- Alert, Ohio, U.S.
- Alert, Nunavut, Canada
  - Alert Airport
- Alert Bay, British Columbia, Canada
- Alert Channel, in Stromness Bay, South Georgia
- Alert Cove, in Stromness Bay, South Georgia

== Ships ==
- CS Alert, the name of several cable-laying ships
- HMS Alert, the name of several ships of the British Royal Navy
  - Alert-class sloop
- SS Alert, a steamship that sank off Victoria, Australia in 1893
- USS Alert or USCGC Alert, the name of several ships of the US Navy or US Coast Guard
- Alert (sternwheeler 1865), a steamboat in Oregon, U.S.

== Other uses ==
- Alert (bridge), in the card game of bridge
- Alert (gum), a caffeinated gum product
- Alert (interbank network), now STAR
- Alert (motorcycle), an English motorcycle 1903–1906
- "Alert" (song), by K. Michelle, 2017
- Alert dialog box, in graphical user interfaces
- Alert messaging, machine-to-person communications such as reminders and notifications
- Alert Records, a Canadian record label
- Alert state, an indication of the state of readiness of the armed forces or a state
- ALERT (medical facility), in Ethiopia
- Alert: Missing Persons Unit, an American television drama series on Fox
- Alberta Law Enforcement Response Teams, an umbrella government agency in Canada
- Arizona League to End Regional Trafficking, an interagency coalition in the U.S.

== See also ==
- Alerta, a city in Peru
- Alerte (disambiguation)
- Red Alert (disambiguation)
- Alarm, device which can generate alerts
