= HMS Phoenix =

Sixteen vessels and two shore establishments of the Royal Navy have been named HMS Phoenix, after the legendary phoenix bird.

The earliest example of the use of HMS as an abbreviation is a reference to HMS Phoenix in 1789.

== Ships ==
- English ship Phoenix (1546), a 20-gun ship purchased in 1546, rebuilt in 1558, and sold in 1573.
- English ship Phoenix (1613), a 20-gun ship launched in 1613 and in the records until 1624.
- English ship Phoenix (1647), a 38-gun ship launched in 1647, in Dutch hands for several months in 1652, and wrecked in 1664.
- English ship Phoenix (1665), a Dutch ship captured in 1665 and sunk as a blockship in 1667.
- HMS Phoenix (1671), a 42-gun fifth rate launched in 1671. She was upgraded to a 42-gun fourth-rate in 1674, but reverted to a 36-gun fifth rate in 1691. She was burnt in 1692 to prevent her capture.
- HMS Phoenix (1692), an 8-gun bomb vessel purchased in 1692 and sold in 1698.
- HMS Phoenix (1694), an 8-gun fire ship launched in 1694, rebuilt in 1709 as a 24-gun sixth-rate and rebuilt again in 1727. She was hulked in 1742 and sold in 1744.
- HMS Phoenix (1743), a 24-gun post ship launched in 1743, used as a hospital hulk after 1755, and was sold in 1762.
- HMS Phoenix (1759), a 44-gun fifth rate launched in 1759 and lost in a hurricane off Cuba in 1780.
- HMS Phoenix (1783), a 36-gun fifth rate launched in 1783 and wrecked in 1816 in the Bay of Chisme near Smyrna when a sudden change of wind threw her on the shore.
- HMS Phoenix (1832), a wooden paddle sloop launched in 1832, converted to screw propulsion in 1845, and sold in 1864.
- HMS Phoenix (1879), a composite Doterel-class screw sloop launched in 1879 and wrecked on the east point of Prince Edward Island, Canada, in 1882, with no loss of life.
- HMS Phoenix (1895), a Phoenix-class sloop launched in 1895 and capsized 1906 in a typhoon at Hong Kong.
- HMS Phoenix (1889), a Pearl-class cruiser launched in 1889. She was renamed HMS Tauranga in 1890 and was sold in 1906.
- HMS Phoenix (1911), an Acheron-class destroyer launched in 1911 and sunk 1918 by the Austro-Hungarian submarine SM U-27.
- HMS Phoenix (N96), a Parthian-class submarine launched in 1929 and sunk by an Italian torpedo boat in 1940.

== Shore establishments ==
- HMS Phoenix (shore establishment, Egypt), a Royal Navy aircraft repair yard in Egypt, in commission between 1941 and 1946.
- HMS Phoenix was the name initially selected to replace HMS Ferret, the anti-submarine school at Londonderry. HMS Sea Eagle was used instead.
- HMS Phoenix (shore establishment, Portsmouth), a fire fighting training establishment in Portsmouth, in commission between 1946 and 1993.
