= Amber alert (disambiguation) =

Amber alert is a child abduction emergency alert message.

Amber alert may also refer to:

== Alert states ==
- Amber alert in an alert state
- Alert state amber in the UK BIKINI state system
- High (Orange) threat level in the U.S. Homeland Security Advisory System

== Arts and entertainment ==
- Amber Alert (film), a 2024 American thriller film
- "Amber Alert", a song by War of Ages from the 2014 album Supreme Chaos
- "Amber Alert", a song by Lil Durk from the 2015 album Remember My Name
- "Amber Alert", an episode of Bad Girls Club (season 4)

== See also ==
- Amber (disambiguation)
- Alert (disambiguation)
- Red Alert (disambiguation)
- Code Adam, a missing-child safety program in the United States and Canada
- Liza Alert, in Russia
