= HMS Edgar (1890) =

Cruiser of the Royal Navy

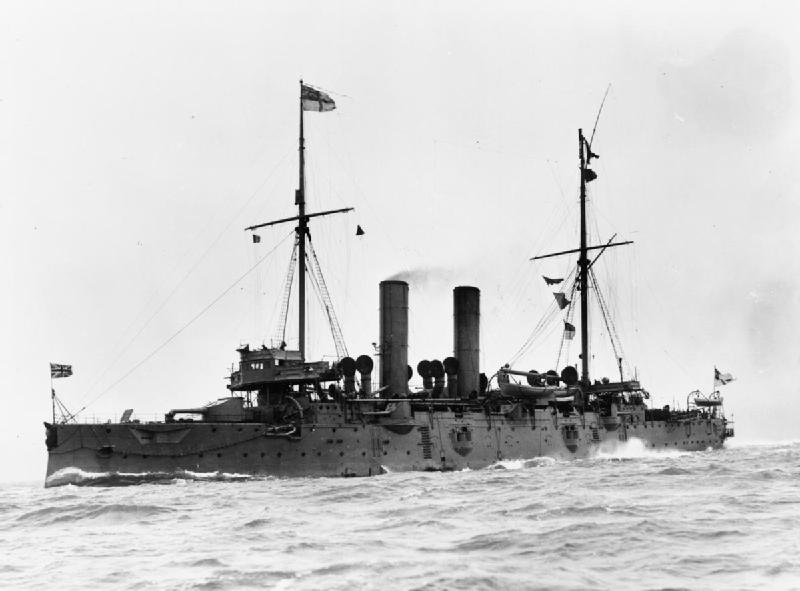
- HMS Edgar

History

United Kingdom
- Name: HMS Edgar
- Builder: Devonport Dockyard
- Laid down: 3 June 1889
- Launched: 24 November 1890
- Fate: Sold for breaking up 9 May 1921

General characteristics
- Class & type: Edgar-class protected cruiser
- Displacement: 7,350 tons
- Length: 387.5 ft (118.1 m)
- Beam: 60 ft (18 m)
- Armament: 2 × BL 9.2-inch (233.7 mm) Mk VI guns; 10 × QF 6-inch (152.4 mm) guns; 12 × 6-pounder guns

HMS Edgar was a first class cruiser of the Royal Navy, and lead ship of the Edgar class. She was built at Devonport and launched on 24 November 1890. She served on the China Station, and in the First World War in the Gallipoli Campaign, along with her sisters Endymion, Grafton and Theseus.

== Service history ==
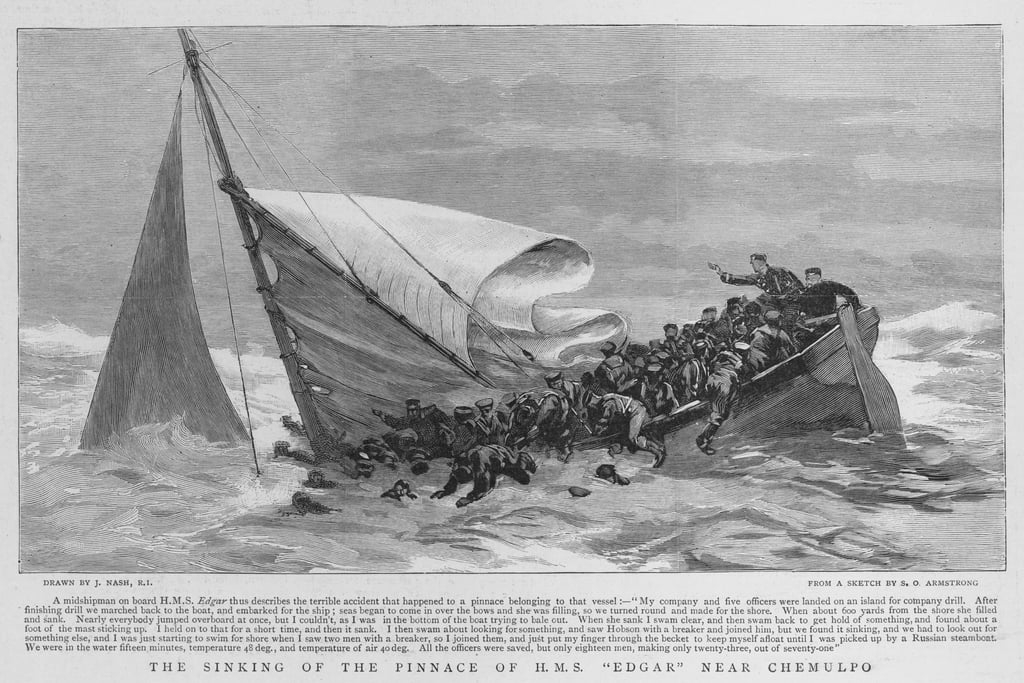
Sinking of Edgar's pinnace off Chemulpo on 13 November 1895, 48 men were lost. The Graphic 1896

Edgar served with the Mediterranean Fleet, until moved to the China Station. On 13 November 1895 the ship's pinnace capsized in a storm off the coast of Chemulpo, Korea. Forty eight men were lost, with a further 23 rescued.

She was recommissioned at Devonport on 20 February 1900, to take relief crews for the sloops Algerine and Phoenix and the survey vessel Waterwitch, which were recommissioned at Hong Kong for the China Station. A crew for the river service steamer HMS Robin, built at Hong Kong, was also included. She left Devonport on 3 March, and called at Gibraltar, Malta, Aden, Colombo and Singapore, before she arrived at the station headquarters at Hong Kong in April. She left for home again after a week.

In April 1902 her boilers were re-tubed due to defects, and after taking part in the Coronation review in August 1902, she was commissioned to relieve Endymion serving on the China Station.

She was damaged in an attack by the Austro-Hungarian submarine SM U-29 on 4 April 1918 in the Mediterranean, near position 35°06′N 14°24′E. Edgar was sold on 9 May 1921. She arrived at Morecambe on 24 April 1923 for breaking up.
