= Alerte =

Alerte may refer to:

== Ships ==
- French brig Alerte (1787)
- HMS Alerte, various ships of the Royal Navy

== People with the surname ==
- Charles Alerte (born 1982), Haitian footballer
- David Alerte (born 1984), French sprinter

== See also ==
- The Cruise of the Alerte, an 1890 travel autobiography by Edward Frederick Knight
- Alert (disambiguation)
