= HMS Algerine (1895) =

Former Sloop of the Royal Navy

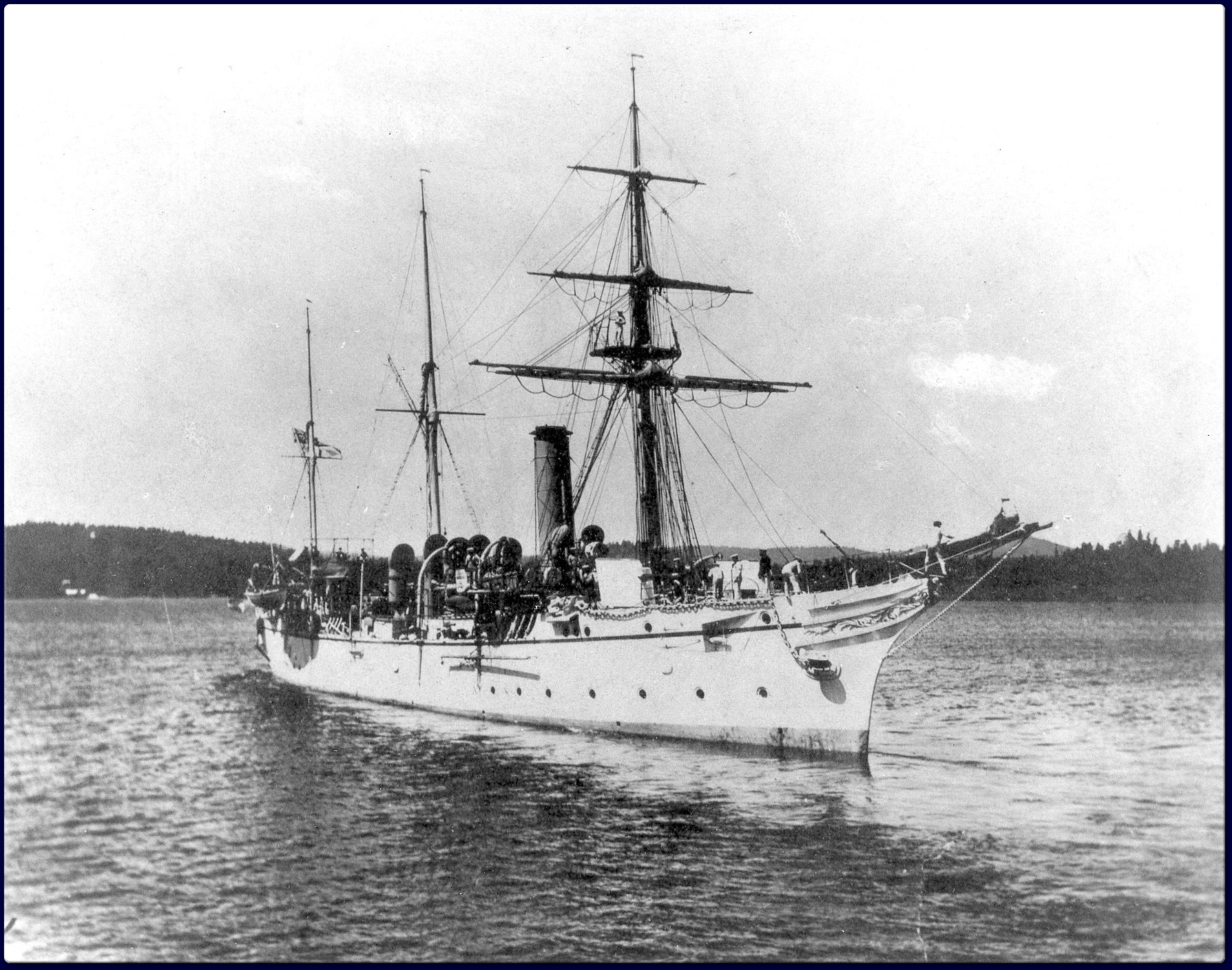
- HMS Algerine at Esquimalt.

History

United Kingdom
- Name: HMS Algerine
- Builder: HM Dockyard, Devonport
- Laid down: 25 July 1894
- Launched: 6 June 1895
- Commissioned: April 1896
- Decommissioned: 8 September 1914
- Fate: Transferred to Royal Canadian Navy, 1917

Canada
- Name: HMCS Algerine
- Acquired: 1917
- Fate: Sold on 11 April 1919; Wrecked in Principe Channel, British Columbia, 13 October 1923

General characteristics
- Type: Phoenix-class sloop
- Displacement: 1,050 tons
- Length: 185 ft (56 m) pp; 210 ft 6 in (64.16 m)oa
- Beam: 32 ft 6 in (9.91 m)
- Draught: 13 ft 1 in (3.99 m)
- Installed power: 1,400 ihp (1,000 kW)
- Propulsion: Three-cylinder vertical triple-expansion steam engine; Twin screws
- Sail plan: Barquentine rigged
- Speed: 13 kn (24 km/h)
- Armament: Six 4-inch/25-pounder (1-ton) QF guns; Four 3-pounder guns; Three Maxim guns
- Armour: Protective deck of 1 to 1 1/2 in (2.5 to 3.8 cm) steel over machinery and boilers

HMS Algerine was a Phoenix-class steel screw sloop of the Royal Navy. She was launched at Devonport in 1895, saw action in China during the Boxer Rebellion, and later served on the Pacific Station. She was stripped of her crew at Esquimalt in 1914, and transferred to the Royal Canadian Navy in 1917, being commissioned as HMCS Algerine. She was sold as a salvage vessel in 1919 and wrecked in 1923.

== Design ==
Algerine was a Phoenix-class steel screw sloop mounting 10 guns. She and her sister ship, Phoenix, were designed by Sir William White, the Admiralty Chief Constructor. The class was essentially a twin-screw version of the Alert-class sloop. The ship had length overall 210 ft 6 in (64.16 m) and measured 185 ft (56 m) between perpendiculars. The vessel had a beam of 32 ft 6 in (9.91 m) and a draught of 13 ft 1 in (3.99 m).

Algerine was constructed of steel and given a protective deck of 1 to 1 1/2 in (2.5 to 3.8 cm) steel armour over her machinery and boilers.

=== Propulsion ===
As built the class were rigged with a barquentine sail plan (square rigged on the foremast, but fore-and-aft rigged on main and mizzen). This was removed in later years, leaving her dependent on her engines alone. However, the masts were never removed.

Algerine was provided with a three-cylinder vertical triple-expansion steam engine developing 1,400 indicated horsepower (1,000 kW) and driving twin screws. The machinery was provided by Devonport Dockyard. This gave the vessel a maximum speed of 13 knots (24 km/h; 15 mph).

=== Armament ===
Her armament consisted primarily of six 4-inch quick-firing guns weighing a ton each and firing a 25-pound (11 kg) shell. In addition she was fitted with four 3-pounder guns and three machine guns. The machine guns were .45 calibre Maxim guns.

== Service history ==
=== Royal Navy service ===
The ship was laid down at Devonport Dockyard on 25 July 1894 and launched on 6 June 1895. Algerine was deployed to the China Station, under Commander Edmond Slade from 1898. She was recommissioned at Hong Kong on 15 February 1900 by Commander Robert Hathorn Johnston Stewart, and served in Chinese waters during the Boxer Rebellion. In June 1900 Algerine was involved in an attack on the Taku Forts by an international naval force, including contributing to a multi-national landing party, and had six men wounded. She also landed a 4-inch gun, and this was used in the capture of Tientsin. Commander Rowland Nugent was appointed in command on 1 May 1902.

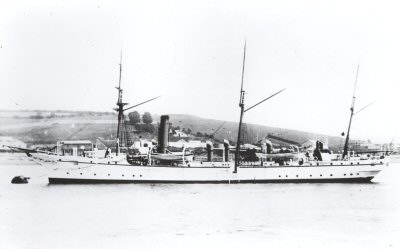
Algerine in China Station white paint in 1904

Algerine served on the Pacific Station at Esquimalt and on the West Coast of the Canada. At the onset of World War I, Algerine and Shearwater were deployed as part of an international squadron off the coast of Mexico, protecting foreign interests during their civil war. Two German cruisers, SMS Leipzig and SMS Nurnberg were reported on the west coast of North America on 4 August 1914 when news of the war broke. HMCS Rainbow was ordered south to cover their withdrawal to Esquimalt, with Algerine making contact with Rainbow only on 14 August after having run short on coal. They entered Esquimalt on 15 August. Following her arrival at Esquimalt, her crew was sent to man HMCS Niobe, and the ship lay unused in harbour for most of the First World War.

=== Royal Canadian Navy and fate ===
In 1917 Algerine was lent to the Royal Canadian Navy to serve as a depot ship at Esquimalt. She was sold on 11 April 1919 for use as a salvage vessel. In her new guise she was wrecked on 13 October 1923 in the Principe Channel, British Columbia. when she ran aground on Brodie Rock. She was then towed to Victoria and sold for scrap in January 1924. (Provincial Archives). The sixth vessel to bear this name.
