= Alert Channel =

Small channel in South Georgia

Alert Channel (54°10′S 36°42′W) is a small channel between Whaler Channel and Bar Rocks, and leading to the head of Husvik Harbor in Stromness Bay, South Georgia. It was charted by Discovery Investigations (DI) personnel in 1928 and named after Alert, the motorboat used by the DI survey party.
