= Charles Morris Woodford =

British Colonial Service administrator

- Woodford in 1885, London

Resident Commissioner of the Solomon Islands
- In office 1896–1915
- Preceded by: First appointment as Resident Commissioner
- Succeeded by: Frederick Joshua Barnett

Personal details
- Born: 30 October 1852 Gravesend, Kent
- Died: 4 October 1927 (aged 74)
- Occupation: Colonial Service

Charles Morris Woodford CMG (30 October 1852 – 4 October 1927) was a British naturalist and colonial government minister active in the Solomon Islands. He became the first Resident Commissioner of the Solomon Islands Protectorate, serving from 1896 (three years after the establishment of the British Solomon Islands Protectorate) until 1915.

== Life before appointment ==
Woodford was born in Gravesend, Kent, the first son of Henry Pack Woodford, a wine merchant. He went to study at Tonbridge school where the headmaster introduced him to the study of natural history. In the early 1880s, Woodford worked for a time for the colonial government in Fiji. He undertook three journeys to the Solomons as a naturalist, and learned several of the local languages. Between 1885 and 1886 he made three unsuccessful attempts to reach the centre of Guadalcanal from his base on nearby Bara Island, to collect specimens for the British Museum.

Woodford noted the decadence of the society in the Solomon Islands following contact with labour recruiters. In his book A Naturalist Among the Head-Hunters, he noted that cannibalism and killing had become common, and deplored the lawlessness. He wrote "I know no place where firm and paternal government would sooner produce beneficial results than the Solomons...while I believe that the natives themselves would not be slow to recognise the advantages of increased security to life and property. Here is an object worthy indeed of the devotion of one's life."

Britain declared a protectorate over the islands in 1893, but did not establish a government. The High Commissioner for the Western Pacific, Sir John Bates Thurston, paid a visit, reporting that there was no means of raising revenue, and that no settled government could be established. He suggested the establishment of a Resident Deputy Commissioner, to attempt to control the firearms trade. The Colonial Office replied that the Solomons must pay for themselves, without indicating how that might be possible.

Woodford knew that there might be a Resident Commissioner appointed for the islands, and was working as an assistant in the High Commissioner's office, figuring that would improve his chances of being appointed. Thurston was away when the Colonial Office refusal came, and was able to write that a small salary recently voted on in the High Commission, and an annual imperial grant of £600, with further revenue to be raised through traders' and recruiters' licenses, as well as commercial prospects.

Furthermore, he wrote that he himself had been appointed Deputy Commissioner, and was proceeding to the islands to report. Woodford then went to Sydney, holding the despatch, to convince Thurston to sign it. Thurston did not have a high opinion of Woodford, but was convinced, and in his last days became a major supporter of him. With the appointment signed, Woodford set off for the Solomons.

From 30 May to 10 August 1896, HMS Pylades toured through the Solomon Islands with Woodford, who was investigating the economic feasibility of the British Solomon Islands Protectorate. On 29 September 1896, in anticipation of the establishment of the British Solomon Islands Protectorate, Woodford purchased the island of Tulagi, which he has selected as the site for the administrative centre.

== Resident Commissioner ==
Home in Guadalcanal

Woodford's report from his first trip as Commissioner in 1896, impressed the Colonial Office, and he was given a small amount of money and permitted to hold the position provisionally for a year, though it remained precarious. The Colonial Office appointed Woodford as the Resident Commissioner in the Solomon Islands on 17 February 1897. He was directed to control the coercive labour recruitment practices, known as blackbirding, operating in the Solomon Island waters and to stop the illegal trade in firearms.

Woodford returned to the Solomons in 1897, with six Fijian policemen and a whaleboat, and about six pence in reserve funds. With this, he founded the colonial capital of Tulagi, on a small island just off the south coast of Florida Island. He urged the crown to assume possession of all unclaimed land, thereby preventing large-scale land purchases, which aroused the Colonial Office's mistrust of big business, and gave him £1200 to build a Residency. Woodford established the first mails from the islands which travelled by sealed bag to Sydney, New South Wales, and from there on to their destination.

A smallpox epidemic at the Anglican Mission settlement of Siota, and the need to impose quarantine, enabled him to get an assistant. Arthur Mahaffy was appointed at the Deputy Commissioner in January 1898. He was based in Gizo, his duties included suppressing headhunting in New Georgia and neighbouring islands. Woodford seized the opportunity provided by the Anglo-German Samoa Convention, in which Germany ceded the North Solomon Islands to Britain, to stress the extension of the area of his responsibility and get another sailing vessel and more police. That year he also established an administrative headquarters for the Western territory, at Gizo.

Natalava in 1887

Civil administration was set up along the lines of the Gilbert Islands and Ellice Islands, starting in the Florida Islands, which were divided into five small districts, each under a chief responsible to Woodford. This political arrangement was welcomed by the Anglican Mission there. Woodford's resources were still limited, however, and for major assistance he had to rely on ships sent by the Royal Navy. In 1910, when three missionaries were killed on Rennell Island, his only possibility was to close the island to outsiders, and when a murder was committed on Malaita, he had to appeal for HMS Torch to be sent to make a punitive raid.

Much of the interest in capital investment that Woodford sought was diverted to Banaba Island, when its rich phosphate discovered in 1900. However, Arthur Hamilton-Gordon, 1st Baron Stanmore, who Woodford had been able to interest in commercial investment in the Solomons, persevered with his plans, buying German landholdings and trying to amass enough capital for large-scale coconut agriculture. In 1905 that land was sold to Lever's Pacific Plantations, and the rent it provided for the protectorate enabled the government to expand further.

Woodford, worried that the Melanesians were a dying race, supported a plan to import labourers from India, which was refused by the India Office. The development of local plantations coincided with the end of the labour trade in Queensland, and the difficulties caused by the repatriation of the workers under the White Australia policy was predicted by Woodford.

Woodford left the islands in January 1914, and by that time the islands were largely pacified, and head-hunting had nearly died out. New Georgia and Malaita remained troubled areas, but a district office on the latter, at Auki, was established in 1909. However, after he left, much of his progress was undone. He retired from public life, and the protectorate government never regained the initiative that it had during his control.

In the King's Birthday Honours list of 14 June 1912 Woodford was made an Ordinary Member of the Third Class, of the Companion of the Order of St Michael and St George.

== Legacy ==
Several animals in the Solomons, including Mynes woodfordi, Corvus woodfordi, Pteropus woodfordi, Nesoclopeus woodfordi, Melonycteris woodfordi, Woodford's rail (Gallirallus woodfordi), and a genus of bird, Woodfordia, were named after Woodford. He is also commemorated in the scientific names of two species of lizards: Lepidodactylus woodfordi and Sphenomorphus woodfordi, and an orchid, Saccolabium woodfordii Rolfe (otherwise known as Robiquetia woodfordii).

== Publications ==
- A Naturalist Among the Head-Hunters (1890)

Government offices
New creation	Resident Commissioner of the Solomon Islands Protectorate; 1896–1915	Succeeded by Frederick Joshua Barnett
