= Sphenomorphus woodfordi =

Conservation status
- Least Concern (IUCN 3.1)

Scientific classification
- Kingdom: Animalia
- Phylum: Chordata
- Class: Reptilia
- Order: Squamata
- Family: Scincidae
- Genus: Sphenomorphus
- Species: S. woodfordi

Binomial name
- Sphenomorphus woodfordi (Boulenger, 1887)

Synonyms
- Lygosoma woodfordii Boulenger, 1887; Sphenomorphus woodfordi — G. Adler, C. Austin & Dudley, 1995

Species of lizard

Sphenomorphus woodfordi is a species of skink, a lizard in the family Scincidae. The species is native to the Solomon Islands and Bougainville.

== Etymology ==
The specific name, woodfordi, is in honor of British naturalist Charles Morris Woodford.

== Habitat ==
The preferred natural habitat of S. woodfordi is forest, at altitudes from sea level to 250 m (820 ft).

== Description ==
Dorsally, S. woodfordi is glossy metallic dark brown, with curved or oblique black crossbars on the flanks. Ventrally it is yellowish. The holotype has a snout-to-vent length (SVL) of 10.6 cm (4.2 in), and a regenerated tail 6 cm (2.4 in) long.

== Reproduction ==
The mode of reproduction of S. woodfordi is unknown.
