= CS Alert =

Four cable-laying ships have been named CS Alert:

- CS Alert (1890), built 1871 as The Lady Carmichael for the Submarine Telegraph Company, taken over by the GPO in 1890 and renamed Alert, cable equipment removed 1915 and ship sold on.
- CS Alert (1918), built 1918, sunk by torpedo 1945.
- CS Alert (1945), built 1915 as an oil tanker named Nordenay, converted to a cable ship for the German navy 1922, given to the GPO as war reparations in 1945 and renamed Alert, scrapped 1960.
- CS Alert (1961), built 1961 for the GPO.

== See also ==
- Alert (disambiguation), for other ships named Alert
