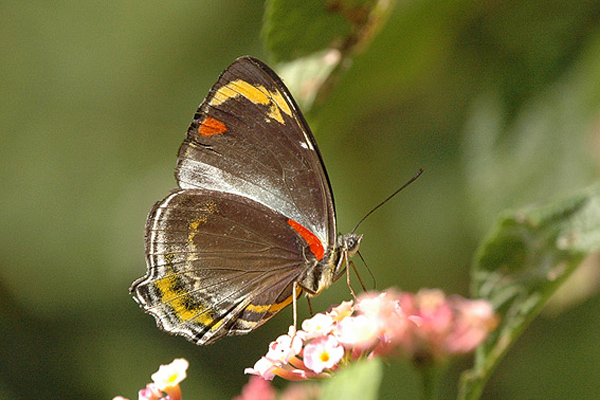
- Mynes geoffroyi

Scientific classification
- Domain: Eukaryota
- Kingdom: Animalia
- Phylum: Arthropoda
- Class: Insecta
- Order: Lepidoptera
- Family: Nymphalidae
- Tribe: Nymphalini
- Genus: Mynes; Boisduval, 1832

= Mynes =

Genus of butterflies

Mynes is a genus of butterflies in the family Nymphalidae found in Australia and Indonesia.

== Species ==
In alphabetical order:

- Mynes anemone Vane-Wright, 1976
- Mynes aroensis Ribbe, 1900
- Mynes doubledayi Wallace, 1869
- Mynes eucosmetus Godman & Salvin, 1879
- Mynes geoffroyi (Guérin-Méneville, 1831) – Jezebel nymph or white nymph
- Mynes halli Joicey & Talbot, 1922
- Mynes katharina Ribbe, 1898
- Mynes marpesina Röber, 1936
- Mynes plateni Staudinger, 1887
- Mynes talboti Juriaane & Volbreda, 1922
- Mynes websteri Grose-Smith, 1894
- Mynes woodfordi Godman & Salvin, 1888
