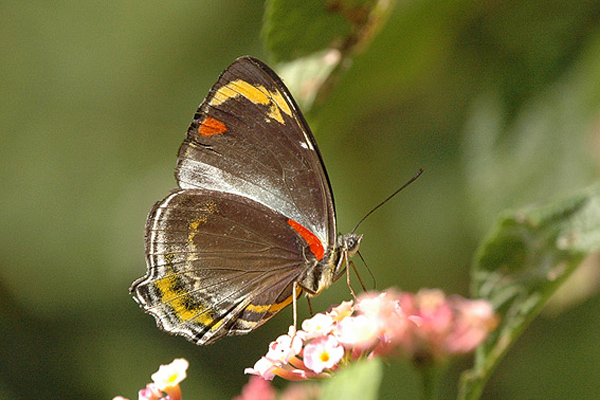

Scientific classification
- Domain: Eukaryota
- Kingdom: Animalia
- Phylum: Arthropoda
- Class: Insecta
- Order: Lepidoptera
- Family: Nymphalidae
- Genus: Mynes
- Species: M. geoffroyi

Binomial name
- Mynes geoffroyi (Guérin-Méneville, 1830)

= Mynes geoffroyi =

Jezebel nymph

Species of butterfly

Mynes geoffroyi, the Jezebel nymph, is a medium-sized butterfly of the family Nymphalidae found in Australia. The subspecies M. g. guerini is called the white nymph.
