= Kanin Point =

Kanin Point (54°11′S 36°42′W) is a rocky point lying 2 nautical miles (4 km) west-southwest of Kelp Point on the south side of Husvik Harbor, in Stromness Bay, South Georgia. The descriptive name "Rocky Point" was given for this feature, probably by Discovery Investigations personnel who surveyed Husvik Harbor in 1928, but this name is used elsewhere in the Antarctic. The South Georgia Survey, 1951–52, reported that this feature is known at the Husvik whaling station as Kanin Point (the word kanin meaning rabbit). The name presumably arose from one of several attempts made since 1872 to introduce rabbits into the island. Kanin Point is approved on the basis of local usage.
