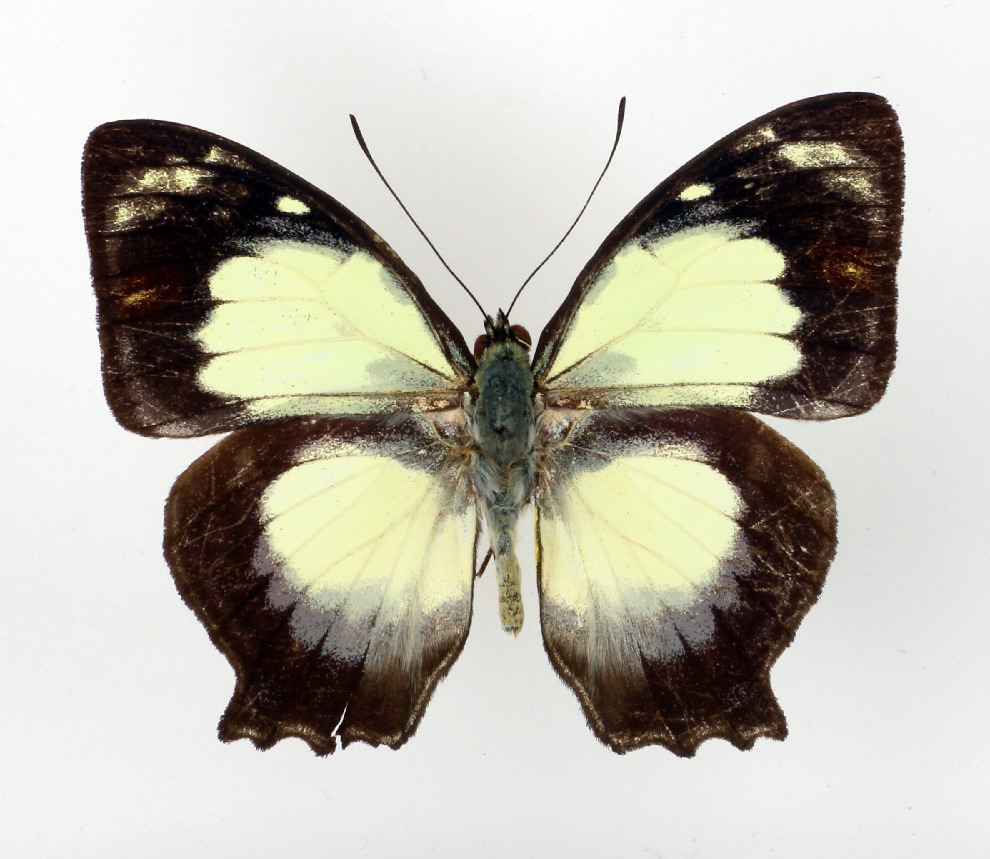
- Male
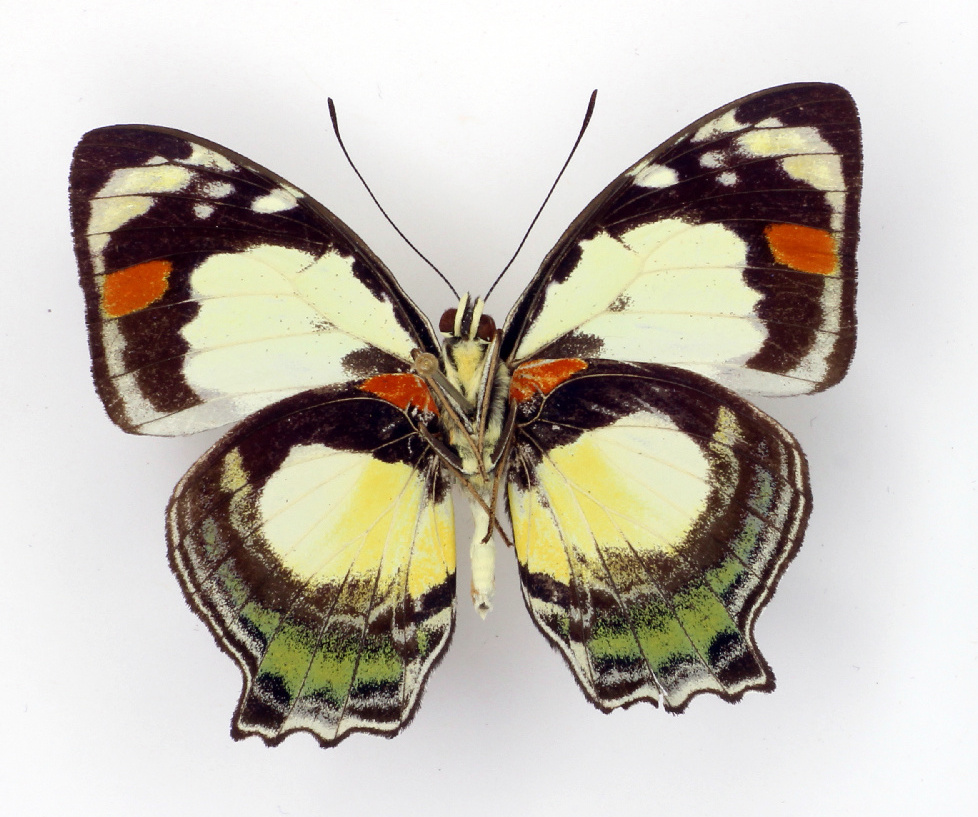
- Male (underside)

Scientific classification
- Domain: Eukaryota
- Kingdom: Animalia
- Phylum: Arthropoda
- Class: Insecta
- Order: Lepidoptera
- Family: Nymphalidae
- Genus: Mynes
- Species: M. woodfordi

Binomial name
- Mynes woodfordi Godman and Salvin, 1888

= Mynes woodfordi =

Species of butterfly

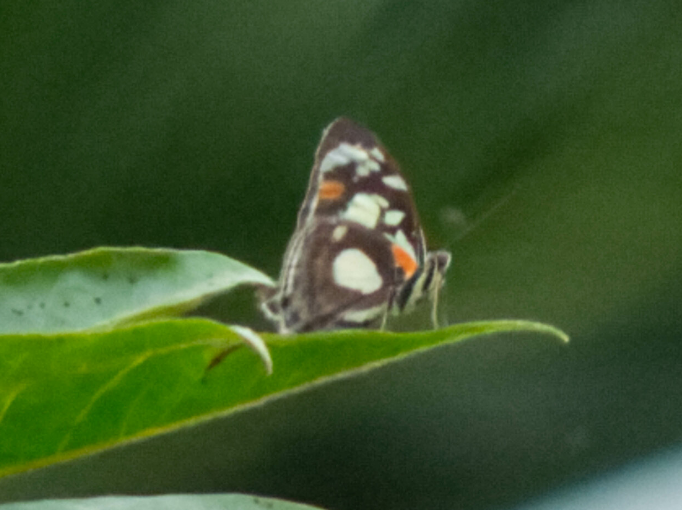
subspecies isabella on Santa Isabel

Mynes woodfordi is a medium-sized butterfly of the family Nymphalidae found in and around the Solomon Islands and Bougainville. It was described by Frederick DuCane Godman and Osbert Salvin in 1888 and named after British naturalist Charles Morris Woodford, later Resident Commissioner of the Solomon Islands. The subspecies M. w. shannoni is named after Ray Shannon, who collected the type specimen in Malaita on the Solomons during his military service in 1944.

== Subspecies ==
- Mynes woodfordi woodfordi Godman & Salvin – Bougainville, Shortland, Treasury Is.
- M. w. isabella Fruhstorfer – Santa Isabel
- M. w. hercyna Godman & Salvin– Guadalcanal
- M. w. shannoni Tennent – Malaita
