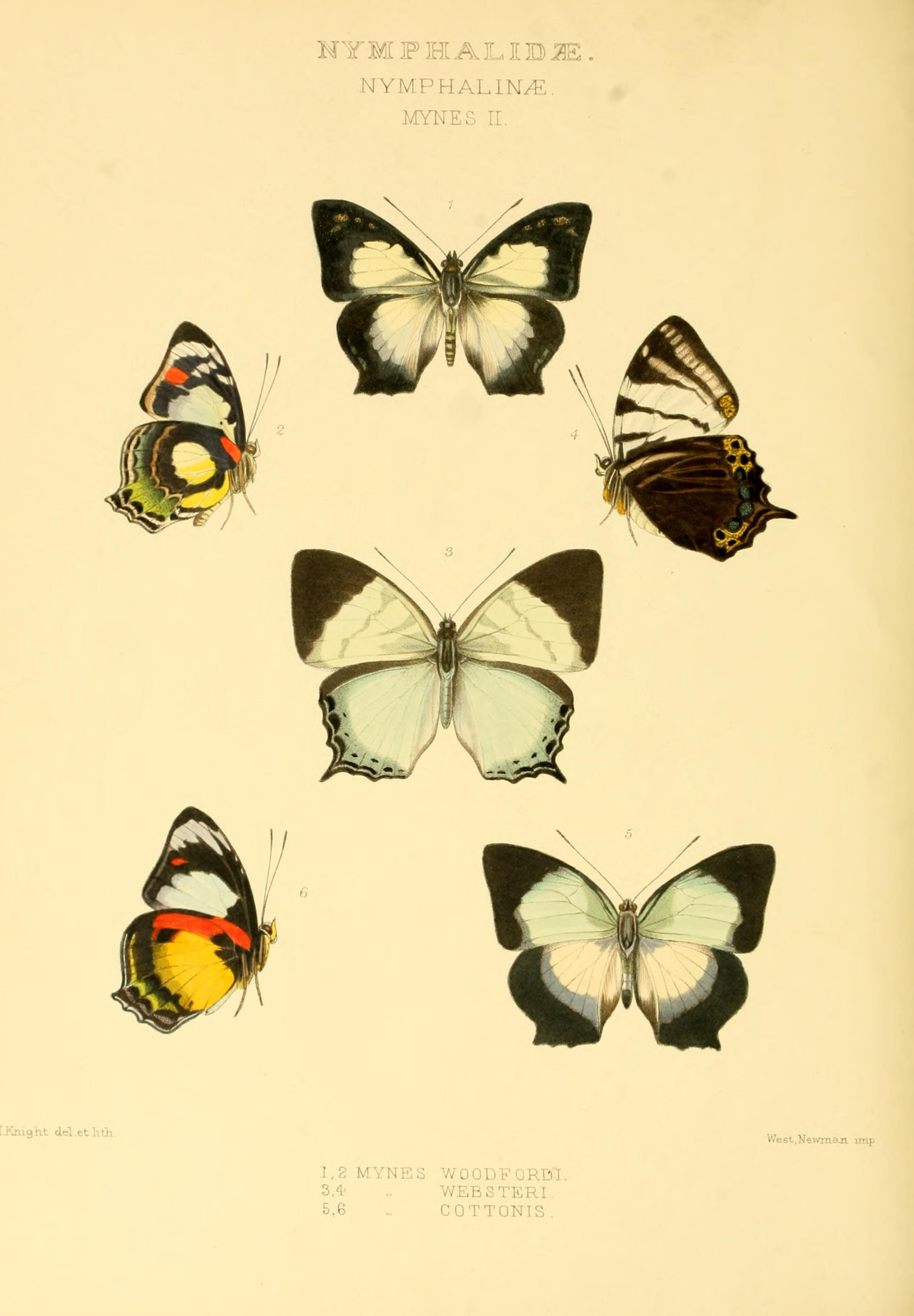
- Mynes websteri in Rhopalocera exotica

Scientific classification
- Domain: Eukaryota
- Kingdom: Animalia
- Phylum: Arthropoda
- Class: Insecta
- Order: Lepidoptera
- Family: Nymphalidae
- Genus: Mynes
- Species: M. websteri

Binomial name
- Mynes websteri Grose-Smith, 1894

= Mynes websteri =

Species of butterfly

Mynes websteri is a medium-sized butterfly of the family Nymphalidae endemic to New Guinea.
