= Bar Rocks =

The Bar Rocks (54°10′S 36°42′W) are a group of low rocks which lie near the head of Husvik Harbor in Stromness Bay, South Georgia. They were charted by DI personnel in 1928 and so named by them, presumably because their presence obstructs or impedes vessels approaching the head of the harbor.
