= Whaler Channel =

Channel leading into Husvik Harbor in Stromness Bay, South Georgia

Whaler Channel (54°10′S 36°42′W) is the northernmost of three small channels leading into Husvik Harbor in Stromness Bay, South Georgia. The name appears to be first used on a 1930 British Admiralty chart.
