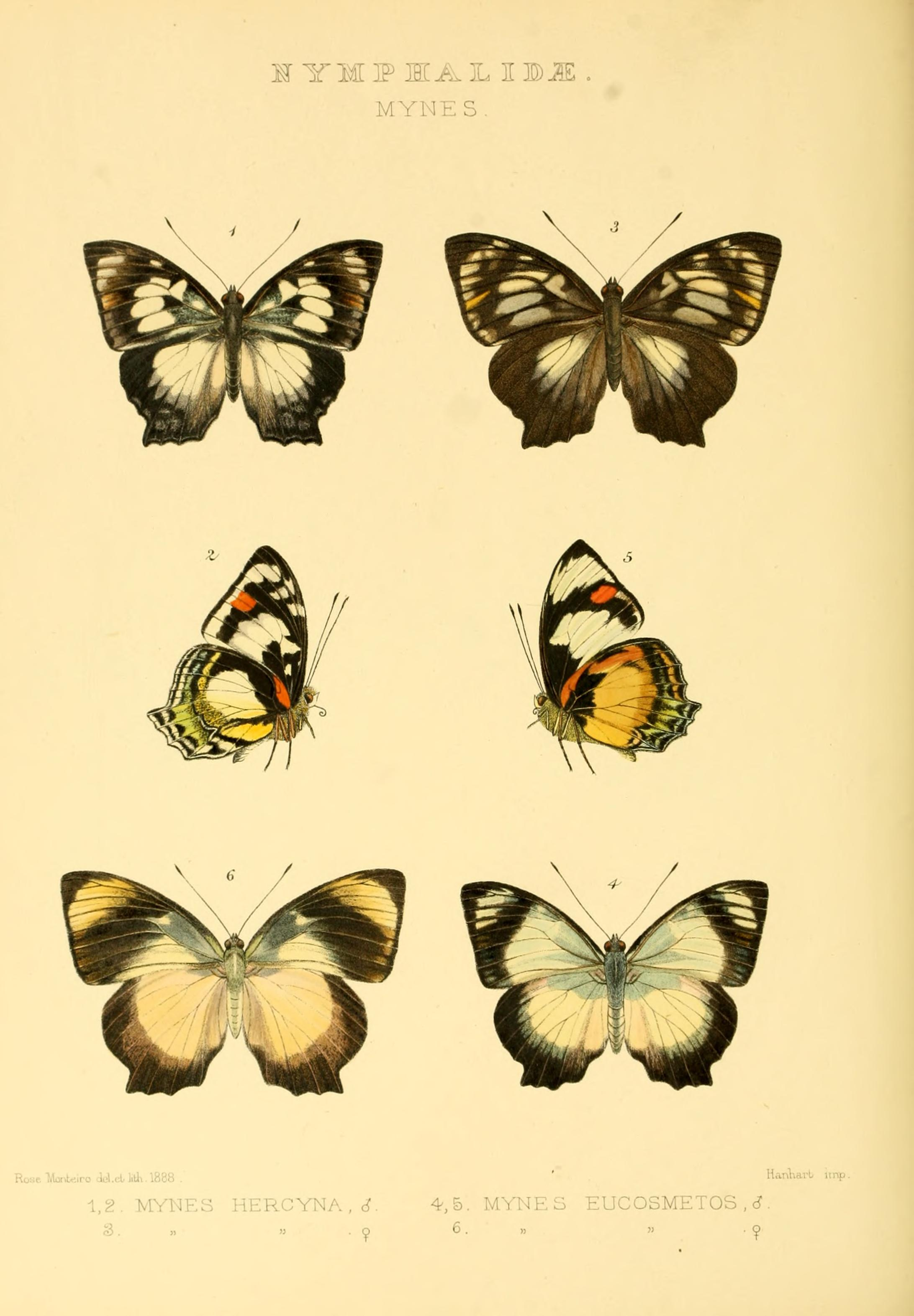
- Mynes eucosmetos in Rhopalocera exotica
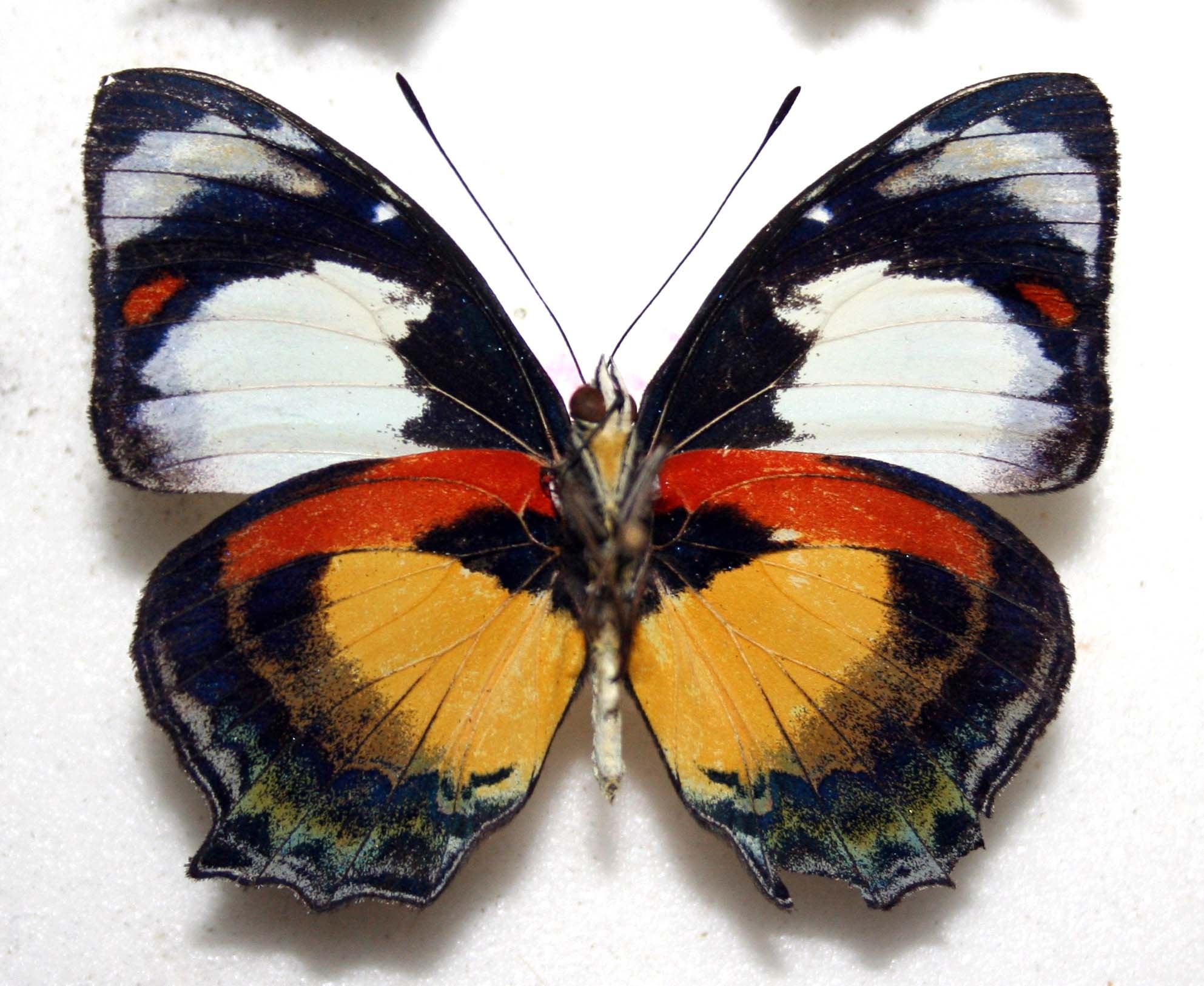

Scientific classification
- Kingdom: Animalia
- Phylum: Arthropoda
- Class: Insecta
- Order: Lepidoptera
- Family: Nymphalidae
- Genus: Mynes
- Species: M. eucosmetos

Binomial name
- Mynes eucosmetos Godman & Salvin, 1879

= Mynes eucosmetus =

Species of butterfly

Mynes eucosmetos is a medium-sized butterfly of the family Nymphalidae endemic to the Bismarck Archipelago.

== Subspecies ==
- M. e eucosmetos New Hanover
- M. e. cottonis Grose-Smith, 1894 New Britain
