= HMS Alert =

Sixteen ships of the Royal Navy have borne the name HMS Alert (or the variants Alerte and Alaart), while another was planned:

- HMS Alert (1753), an 8-gun cutter in service from 1753 to 1754.
- HMS Alert (1777), a 10-gun cutter launched at Dover in 1777, converted to a sloop in the same year, and captured in the Channel by the French frigate Junon in 1778; foundered December 1779 off the coast of America. French records show her serving as Alerte, a cutter of fourteen 4-pounder guns and valued as a prize at Lt 32,289.
- HMS Alert (1779), a 10-gun cutter launched at Dover in 1778 and captured by the French frigate Diligente in September 1780 in the Bay of Biscay. The prize was valued at Lt52,405. In French service she was armed with six 8-pounder guns and twelve 18-pounder howitzers. Perseverance recaptured her in North American waters on 7 December 1781, after a strong resistance.
- HMS Alert (1790), a 4-gun schooner purchased in 1790, wrecked in 1791, but possibly salved and broken up in 1799.
- HMS Alert (1793), a 16-gun sloop launched at Rotherhithe in 1794 and captured by the French Unité in May off the coast of Ireland; wrecked later that year in the Bay of Audierne after action with HMS Flora and HMS Arethusa.
- HMS Alert (1795), an 8-gun brig-sloop launched at Bombay in 1795.
- HMS Alerte, a 14-gun brig-sloop launched in 1787, captured from the French in 1793, retaken by the French after being burnt to the waterline that same year and rebuilt by them, captured by HMS Captain in 1799, renamed HMS Minorca and sold in 1802.
- HMS Alert (1804), previously the collier Oxford, purchased in 1804 and captured by USS Essex in 1812; remained in US service until 1829.
- HMS Allart (1807) (or Alaart), a 16-gun Danish sloop captured in 1807 and retaken by the Danes in 1809. She was to be named Cassandra.
- HMS Alert (1813), a Cruizer-class brig-sloop, launched in 1813 and sold in 1832.
- HMS Alert (1835), an 8-gun packet-brig launched in 1835 at Rotherhithe and broken up in 1851.
- HMS Alert (1848), an 8-gun brig, previously a slaver, captured in 1848 and sold 1850.
- HMS Alert (1856), a wooden Cruizer-class screw sloop launched in 1856 at Pembroke Dock. She was converted for Arctic exploration in 1874, reached 82°N in the expedition of 1876, worked as a survey vessel, and was loaned to the US Navy and the Canadian Government. She was laid up in 1884 and sold.
- HMS Alert (1894), an Alert-class sloop launched in 1894 at Sheerness. She was lent to the civil authority at Basra in 1918 and sold to them in 1926 for use as a pilot vessel. She was broken up in 1949.
- Alert was an Algerine-class minesweeper, renamed HMS Acute in 1941 before being launched in 1942.
- HMS Alert (K647), a Bay-class frigate launched in 1945, originally Dundrum Bay and Loch Scamadale. She was sold in 1971.

In addition, the Royal Navy used several hired armed vessels with the name Alert, including several cutters Alert and a lugger Alert.
