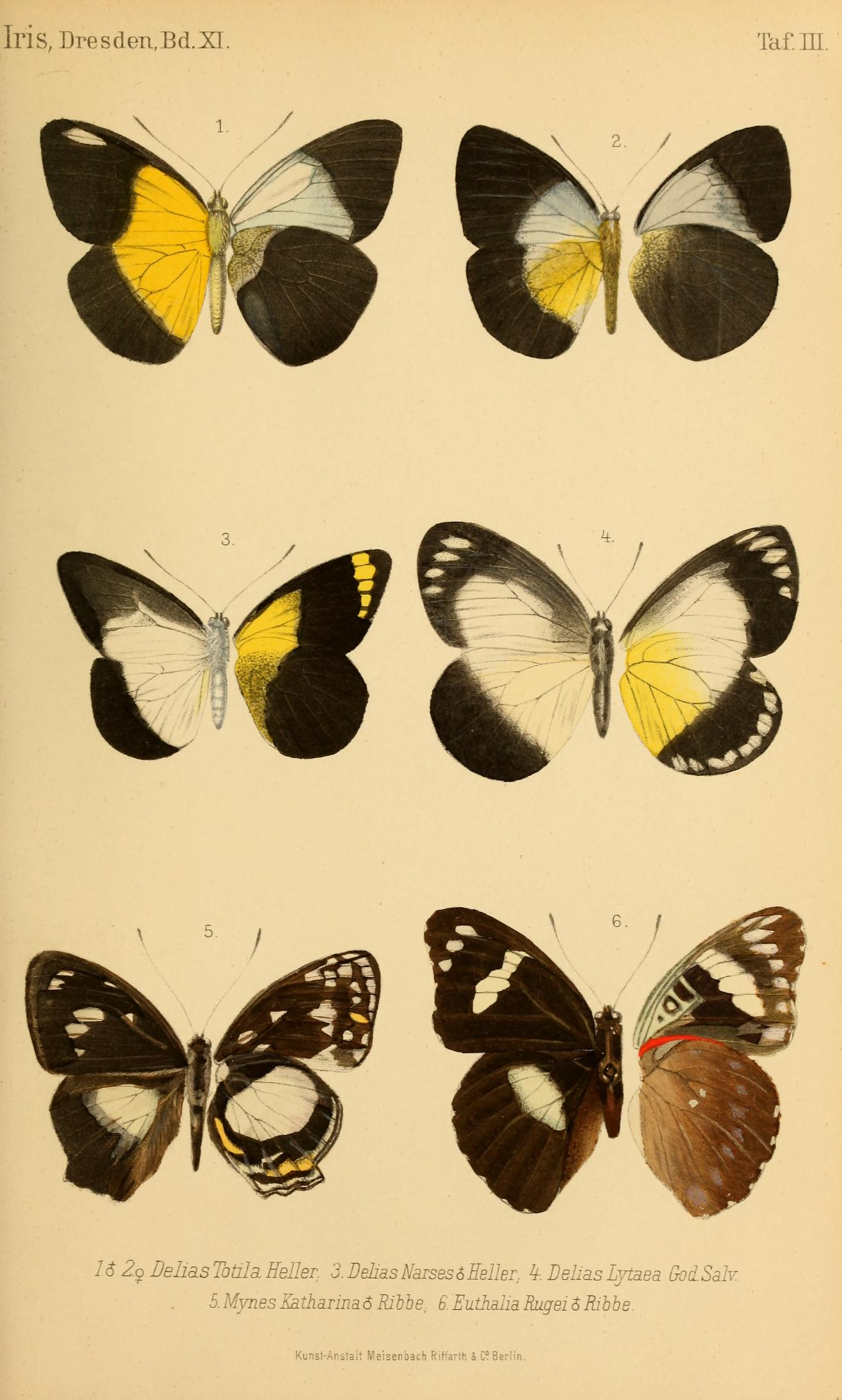
- plate accompanying original description

Scientific classification
- Domain: Eukaryota
- Kingdom: Animalia
- Phylum: Arthropoda
- Class: Insecta
- Order: Lepidoptera
- Family: Nymphalidae
- Genus: Mynes
- Species: M. katharina

Binomial name
- Mynes katharina Ribbe, 1898

= Mynes katharina =

Species of butterfly

Mynes katharina , is a medium-sized butterfly of the family Nymphalidae endemic to the Bismarck Archipelago (New Hanover, New Ireland, New Britain).
