= Brain Island =

Island of South Georgia

Brain Island (54°10′S 36°42′W) is an island at the north side of Husvik Harbor, in Stromness Bay, South Georgia. It was charted and named by DI personnel in 1928.

== See also ==
- List of Antarctic and sub-Antarctic islands
