= Ray Shannon =

New Zealand lepidopterist and collector (1917–2008)

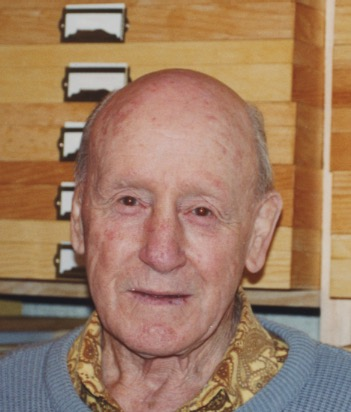
Ray Shannon, October 1996, with his butterfly collection

Raymond Thomas Shannon (1 July 1917 – 7 June 2008) was a New Zealand butterfly collector who at one point had New Zealand's largest collection in private hands. His collecting began while on military service in WWII in the Solomon Islands, and continued for over fifty years. On his death his specimens were donated to the Auckland Museum.

== Life ==
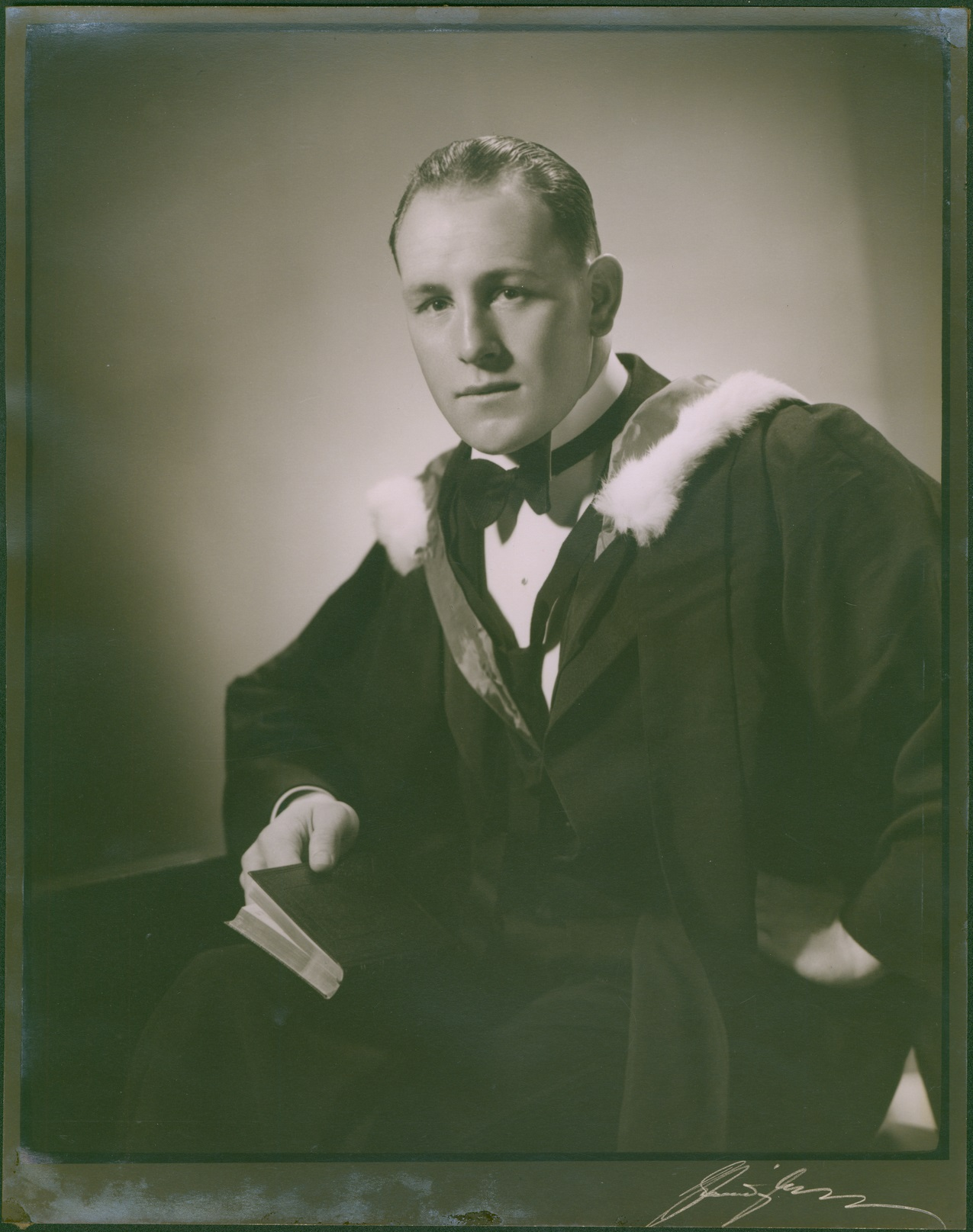
Ray Shannon in graduation robes, c. 1940

Shannon was born in Ngāruawāhia, New Zealand, to Gertrude and Thomas Shannon. His childhood was spent in Hamilton, where he attended Whitiora Primary School and Hamilton High School, and later Wellington Technical College. As a young man he was a keen sportsman, excelling in rowing, swimming, rugby, and hunting. He graduated in 1940 from Victoria University College of the University of New Zealand with a Bachelor of Science in Electrical Engineering. Shannon joined the New Zealand Air Force in June 1942 as a radio mechanic, and served in Guadalcanal in the Solomon Islands. After the war he worked as an engineer in the Post and Telegraph Department for the rest of his career. He never married, retired to Birkdale, North Shore, and died in Tauranga in 2008.

== Butterfly collecting ==
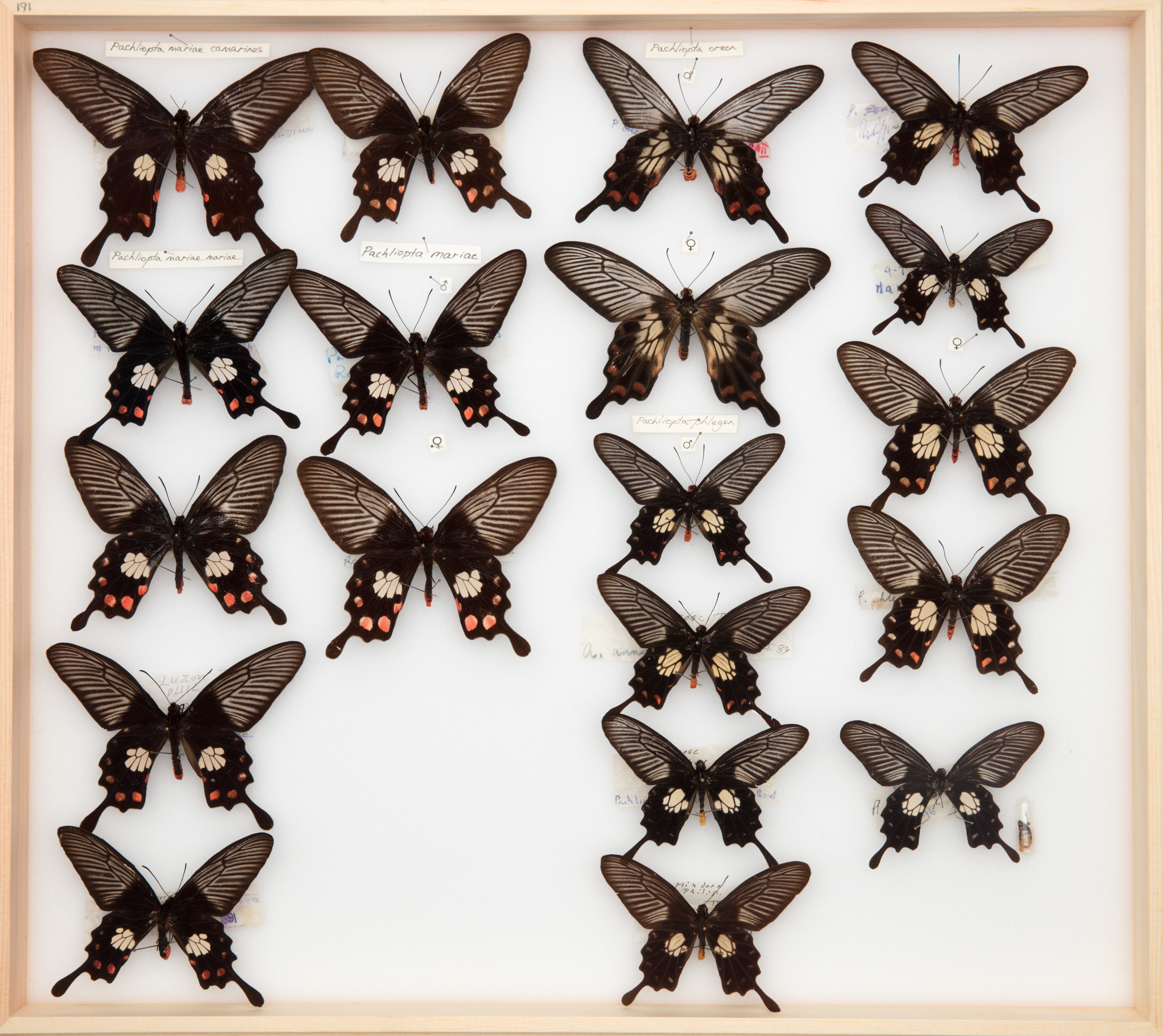
Female Philippines swallowtail butterflies (Pachliopta mariae marie) from Shannon's collection

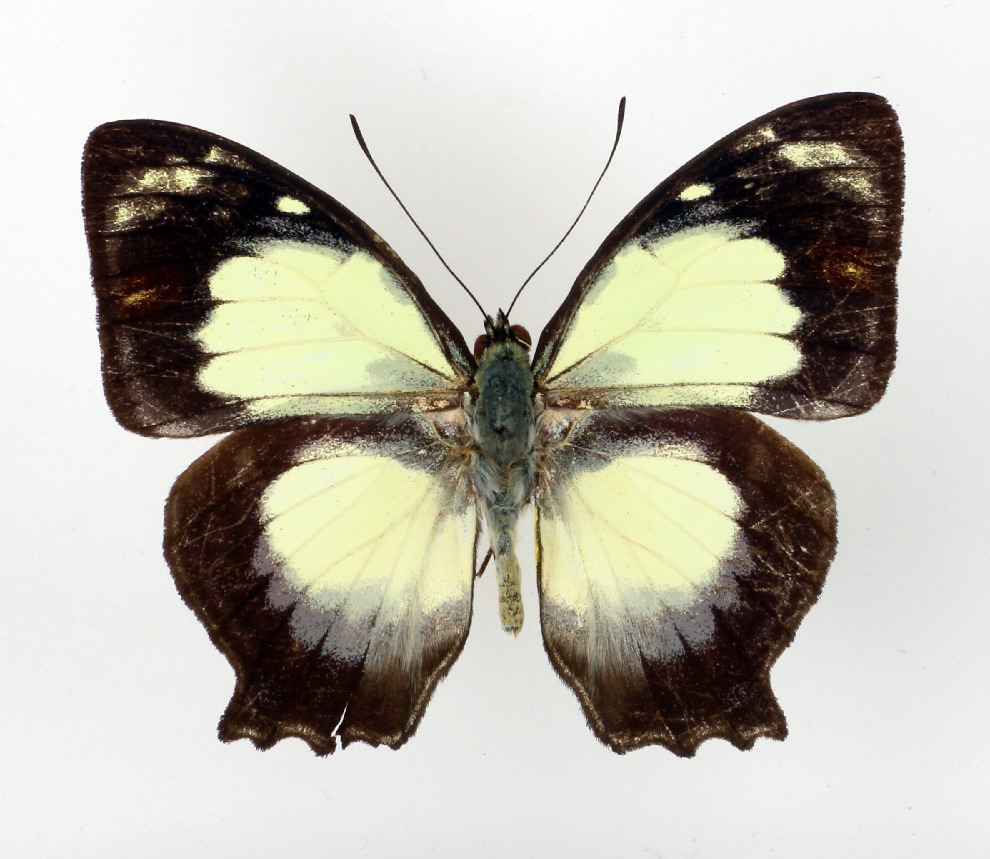
Male Mynes woodfordi shannoni in the collection of the Natural History Museum, London

As a young man, Shannon was an avid butterfly collector, and before his posting in the Solomon Islands in World War II he consulted with entomologists at the Plant Diseases Division of the DSIR, who supplied him with cyanide for killing insects. He converted large biscuit tins for butterfly storage by installing racks of card on which to pin his collections. On one occasion he observed a male birdwing butterfly from a sandbagged radar station 15 feet above ground. Shannon jumped off the embankment, net in hand, and caught the butterfly before hitting the ground. "The bruises were worth it," he later said. On the island of Malaita he observed one species, Mynes woodfordi, that congregated only in the tops of papaya trees, and constructed a special net with several bamboo pole extensions to capture one; the specimen many years later became the holotype of a new subspecies, which was named Mynes woodfordi shannoni in his honour. The butterflies Shannon collected were preserved in his storage tins, which were carried on boats and though surf from island to island throughout his military service.

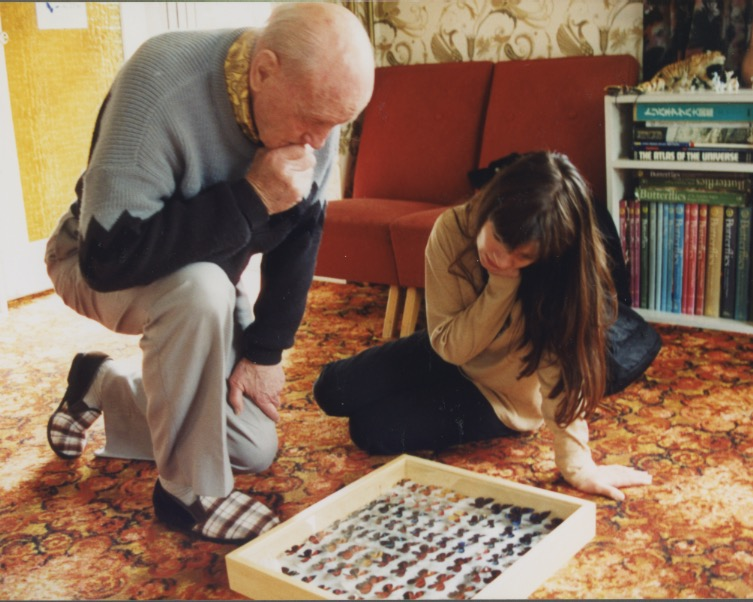
Ray Shannon in his Birkdale flat in October 1996, showing part of his butterfly collection to Rosemary Gilbert, entomology technician at Auckland Museum.

After the war, he continued collecting well into his 80s, making expeditions to many tropical countries including Peru, Indonesia, Malaysia, New Guinea, Japan, and Costa Rica. He eventually amassed 400 drawers of butterflies, approximately 13,000 specimens: possibly the largest private butterfly collection in New Zealand. Shannon was also an assiduous collector of reference books about Lepidoptera, and continued to purchase butterfly specimens from dealers after his declining health prevented further expeditions. On his death, his papers and butterfly collection were donated to Auckland Museum, and became the centrepiece for the 2018 exhibition The Secret World of Butterflies.
