= Woodford's scaly-toed gecko =

Scientific classification
- Kingdom: Animalia
- Phylum: Chordata
- Class: Reptilia
- Order: Squamata
- Suborder: Gekkota
- Family: Gekkonidae
- Genus: Lepidodactylus
- Species: L. woodfordi

Binomial name
- Lepidodactylus woodfordi Boulenger, 1887

Species of lizard

Woodford's scaly-toed gecko (Lepidodactylus woodfordi) is a species of lizard in the family Gekkonidae. The species is native to Papua New Guinea and the Solomon Islands.

== Etymology ==
The specific name, woodfordi, is in honor of British naturalist Charles Morris Woodford.

== Reproduction ==
L. woodfordi is oviparous.
