= Alert Cove =

Alert Cove (54°11′S 36°42′W) is a small cove lying south of Kanin Point in Husvik Harbor, Stromness Bay, on the north coast of South Georgia. It was charted by Discovery Investigations (DI) personnel in 1928 and is named after Alert, the motorboat used by the DI survey party.
