= Phoenix-class sloop =

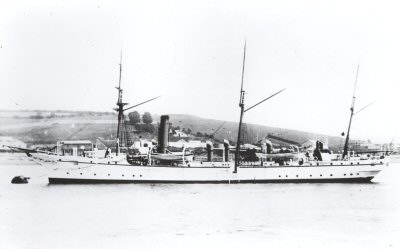
- Algerine

Class overview
- Name: Phoenix-class sloops
- Operators: Royal Navy; (United Kingdom) Royal Canadian Navy
- Built: 1895
- In commission: 1895–1919
- Completed: 2
- Lost: 1

General characteristics
- Type: Steel screw sloop
- Displacement: 1050 tons
- Length: 185 ft (56 m) pp; 210 ft 6 in (64.16 m) oa
- Beam: 32 ft 6 in (9.91 m)
- Draught: 13 ft 1 in (3.99 m)
- Installed power: 1,400 hp (1,044 kW)
- Propulsion: 3-cylinder vertical triple-expansion steam engine; 2 screws
- Sail plan: Barquentine rigged
- Speed: 13 kn (24 km/h)
- Armament: 6 × 4-inch/25-pdr (1-ton) QF guns; 4 × 3-pounder (47-mm) guns; 3 × machine guns
- Armour: Protective deck of 1 to 1 1/2 in (2.5 to 3.8 cm) steel over machinery and boilers

The Phoenix class was a two-ship class of 6-gun screw steel sloops built for the Royal Navy in 1895. Both ships participated in the suppression of the Boxer Rebellion, but Phoenix was destroyed in a typhoon while alongside in Hong Kong in 1906. Algerine became a depot ship at Esquimalt, was sold in 1919, and was finally wrecked in 1923.

== Design ==
Phoenix and Algerine were constructed of steel and powered by both barquentine-rigged sails and a twin-screw steam engine developing 1,400 horsepower. They were essentially a twin-screw version of the Alert-class sloop.

== Operational lives ==
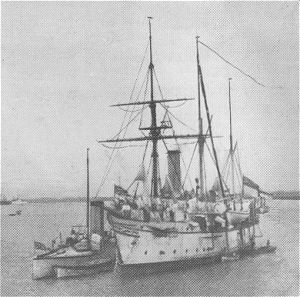
Phoenix at anchor in the Hai River in about 1900

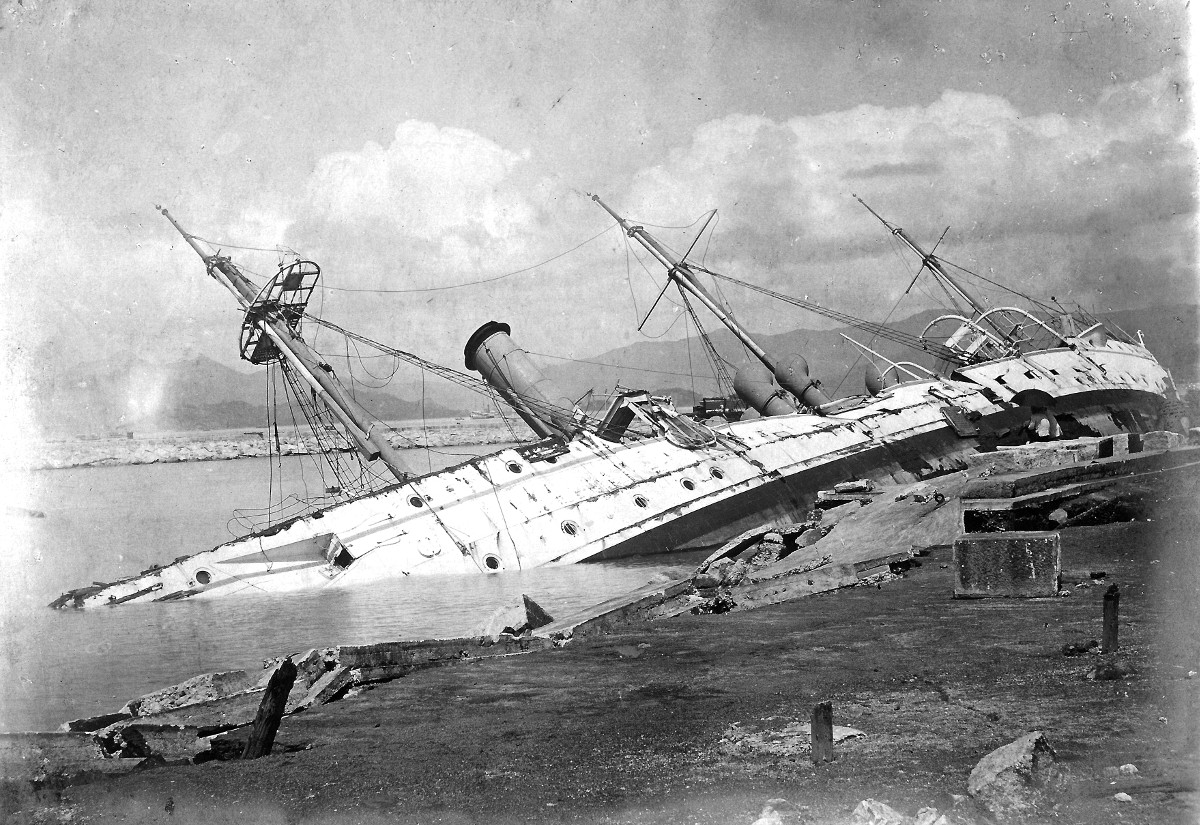
Phoenix foundered alongside a coaling pier in Hong Kong after a typhoon in 1906

Screw sloops like Phoenix had been obsolete for many years, but they remained ideal for patrolling Britain's far flung maritime empire, and both Phoenix and Algerine were deployed to the China Station. Both ships recommissioned at Hong Kong and served in Chinese waters during the Boxer Rebellion. In June 1900 Algerine was involved in an attack on the Taku Forts, including contributing to a multi-national landing party, and had 6 men wounded. She also landed a 4-inch gun, and this was used in the capture of Tientsin. Phoenix had the misfortune to be alongside a coaling pier in Hong Kong on 18 September 1906 when a typhoon struck the colony. She foundered and became a total loss. Algerine continued to serve, including time at Esquimalt and the West Coast of the United States. In 1914 her crew was sent to man Niobe, and in 1917 she was lent to the Royal Canadian Navy to serve as a depot ship at Esquimalt. She was sold in 1919 and converted to a salvage vessel. In her new guise she was wrecked on 13 October 1923 in the Principe Channel, British Columbia.

== Ships ==
Name	Ship Builder	Launched	Fate
Phoenix	Devonport Royal Dockyard	25 April 1895	Foundered 18 September 1906 during a typhoon alongside a coaling pier in Hong Kong. Raised and sold on 7 January 1907.
Algerine	Devonport Royal Dockyard	28 December 1895	Sold 1919. Wrecked 1924.
