= Red Notice (disambiguation) =

A red notice is an interpol notice issued to seek the location and arrest of a person wanted by a judicial jurisdiction or an international tribunal with a view to their extradition.

Red Notice may also refer to:

- Red Notice (film), a 2021 American comedy action thriller film about an art thief
- Red Notice, a 2012 novel by Andy McNab about a train hijack in the Channel Tunnel
  - SAS: Red Notice, a 2021 film based on the novel
- Red Notice: A True Story of High Finance, Murder, and One Man's Fight for Justice, a 2015 memoir by Bill Browder

== See also ==
- Red Alert (disambiguation)
