= HMS Phoenix (1895) =

Sloop of the Royal Navy

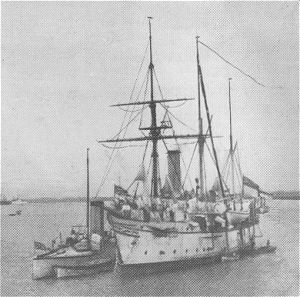
- HMS Phoenix at anchor in the Hai River in about 1900

History

United Kingdom
- Name: HMS Phoenix
- Builder: HM Dockyard, Devonport
- Laid down: 25 July 1894
- Launched: 25 April 1895
- Commissioned: April 1896
- Fate: Capsized in a typhoon in 1906 22.3°N 114.2°E; Raised and sold in 1907

General characteristics
- Type: Phoenix-class sloop
- Displacement: 1,050 tons
- Length: 185 ft (56 m) pp; 210 ft 6 in (64.16 m)oa
- Beam: 32 ft 6 in (9.91 m)
- Draught: 13 ft 1 in (3.99 m)
- Installed power: 1,400 ihp (1,000 kW)
- Propulsion: Three-cylinder vertical triple-expansion steam engine; Twin screws
- Sail plan: Barquentine rigged
- Speed: 13 kn (24 km/h)
- Armament: 6 × 4-inch/25-pdr (1-ton) QF guns; 4 × 3-pound guns; 3 × machine guns
- Armour: Protective deck of 1 to 1 1/2 in (2.5 to 3.8 cm) steel over machinery and boilers

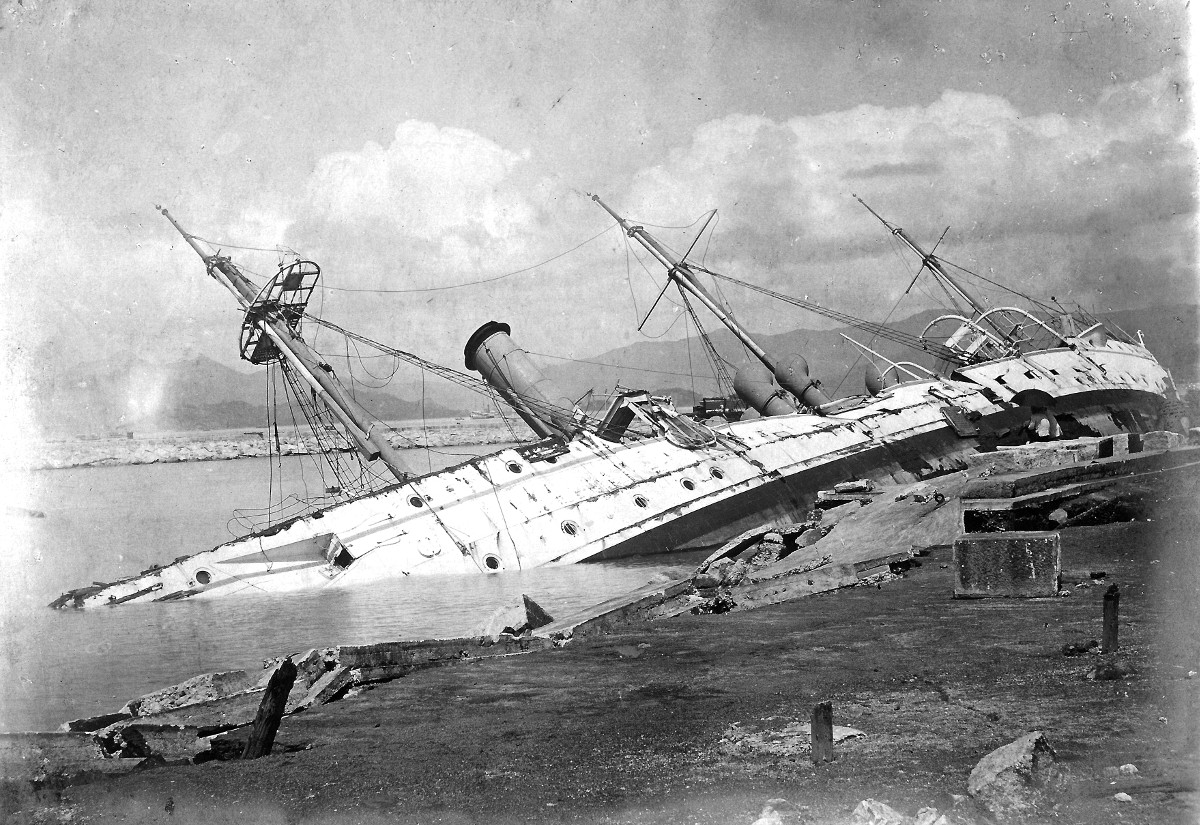
HMS Phoenix foundered alongside a coaling pier in Hong Kong after a typhoon in 1906.

HMS Phoenix was a Royal Navy Phoenix-class steel screw sloop, launched at Devonport in 1895. She saw action in China during the Boxer Rebellion, and later served on the Pacific Station. She had the misfortune to be alongside a coaling pier in Hong Kong on 18 September 1906 when a typhoon struck the colony. She foundered and became a total loss.

== Design ==
Phoenix was the name ship of her class of steel screw sloops mounting 10 guns. She and her sister ship, Algerine, were designed by Sir William White, the Admiralty Chief Constructor. The class was essentially a twin-screw version of the Alert-class sloop.

=== Construction ===
Phoenix was constructed of steel and given a protective deck of 1 to 1 1/2 in (2.5 to 3.8 cm) steel armour over her machinery and boilers. She was laid down at Devonport Dockyard on 25 July 1894 and launched on 25 April 1895.

=== Sail plan ===
As built the class was rigged with a barquentine sail plan (square rigged on the foremast, but fore-and-aft rigged on main and mizzen).

=== Propulsion ===
Phoenix was provided with a three-cylinder vertical triple-expansion steam engine developing 1,400 indicated horsepower (1,000 kW) and driving twin screws. The machinery was provided by Devonport Dockyard.

=== Armament ===
Her armament consisted primarily of six 4-inch quick-firing guns weighing a ton each and firing a 25-pound (11 kg) shell. In addition she was fitted with four 3-pounder guns and three machine guns.

== Royal Navy service ==
Phoenix was deployed to the China Station. She served in Chinese waters during the Boxer Rebellion under the command of Edward Hobart Seymour.

== Fate ==
Phoenix was alongside a coaling pier at Hong Kong on 18 September 1906 when a typhoon struck. She foundered and was declared a total loss. She was raised in 1907 and sold.
