= Alert, Ohio =

Unincorporated community in Ohio, U.S.

Coordinates: 39°19′30″N 84°46′31″W

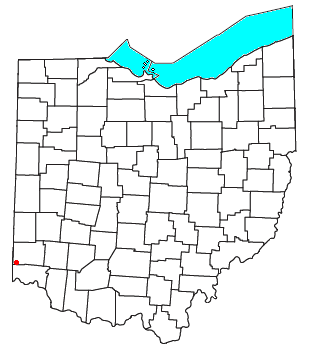
Location of Alert, Ohio

Alert is an unincorporated community in southern Morgan Township, Butler County, Ohio, in the United States. It is located about ten miles southwest of Hamilton on Howards Creek, a tributary of the Great Miami River in section 28 of R1ET3N of the Congress Lands. It is three miles west of Shandon and two miles south of Okeana.
