= Rowland Nugent =

Royal Navy Admiral (1861–1948)

Admiral Rowland Nugent (22 December 1861 – 25 March 1948) was a Royal Navy officer.
