= Alert (motorcycle) =

Motorcycle

- Production: 1903–1906
- Class: Motorcycle
- Engine: 2.35 hp, 2.75 hp, 3.25 hp Saroléa

Alert was an English motorcycle manufactured by Smith & Molesworth at Coventry between 1903 and 1906. The bikes were powered by 2.35, 2.75 and 3.25 bhp Saroléa engines.
