= USS Alert =

Five ships of the United States Navy have borne the name Alert. During World War I, three ships held the name simultaneously.

- USS Alert (1812), was an 18-gun sloop-of-war captured from the United Kingdom in the War of 1812 that was sold in 1829 for breaking up.
- USS Alert (1861), was a screw tug used during the Civil War.
- USS Alert (AS-4), was a screw steamer in use during the late 19th century and World War I.
- USS Alert (1896), was a steam launch acquired from the Coast Guard during World War I.
- USS Alert (SP-511), was used as a patrol boat during World War I.

Seven cutters of the United States Coast Guard have borne the name Alert.

- USRC Alert (1818) A schooner homeported at Eastport, Maine. 75 ton displacement.
- USRC Alert (1829) A schooner built to replace built to replace Alert (1818). 120 ton displacement.
- USRC Alert (1877) A centerboard sloop used for life saving duty at Tom's River, New Jersey. 10 ton displacement.
- USRC Alert (1901) A steam launch originally homeported at Mobile, Alabama. 19 ton displacement.
- USRC Alert (1907) A steam harbor tug replacing Alert (1901) at Mobile, Alabama. 35 ton displacement.
- USCGC Alert (WMEC-127) An Active-class cutter, commissioned as WSC-127, homeported at various stations in California.
- USCGC Alert (WMEC-630), a Reliance-class cutter.

== Bibliography ==
- Canney, Donald L. (1995). U.S. Coast Guard and Revenue Cutters, 1790-1935. Naval Institute Press, Annapolis. ISBN 978-1-55750-101-1.
- Scheina, Robert L. (1990). U.S. Coast Guard Cutters & Craft, 1946-1990. Naval Institute Press, Annapolis. ISBN 978-0-87021-719-7.
