= Hired armed lugger Alert =

Alert was a hired armed lugger that served the British Royal Navy from 27 March 1804 to 4 March 1805. Alert had a burthen of 11980/94 tons and was armed with six 12-pounder and eight 6-pounder guns, and two 12-pounder carronades. During 1804 Alert was renamed Lucy.

Lucy was under the command of Lieutenant Thomas Delafons on 30 December 1804 when she captured the Spanish ship St Andero. St Andero, Beragorte, master, came into Plymouth. She had come from Vera Cruz and was carrying 100,000 dollars, and a cargo of sugar, indigo, and cochineal.

Later, Lucy captured and sent into Plymouth the chasse maree Deux Freres, which had been sailing from Île de Ré to Bordeaux.
