= HMS Torch (1894) =

Sloop of the Royal Navy

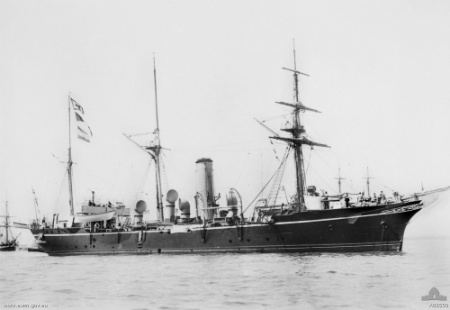
- HMS Torch c. 1900.

History

United Kingdom
- Name: HMS Torch
- Builder: Sheerness Dockyard
- Laid down: 18 December 1893
- Launched: 28 December 1894
- Commissioned: October 1895
- Fate: Transferred to New Zealand government on 16 August 1917

New Zealand
- Name: HMS Firebrand
- Fate: Sold in July 1920

United Kingdom
- Name: Rama
- Fate: Wrecked on 17 November 1924 near the Chatham Islands.

General characteristics
- Class & type: Alert-class sloop
- Type: Screw steel sloop
- Displacement: 960 tons
- Length: 180 ft (55 m)
- Beam: 32 ft (9.8 m)
- Draught: 12 ft (3.7 m)
- Installed power: 1,400 hp (1,044 kW)
- Propulsion: Three-cylinder vertical triple expansion steam engine; single screw
- Sail plan: As built: Barque rigged; After about 1900: Barquentine rigged
- Complement: 107
- Armament: 6 × BL 4-inch (101.6 mm) guns; 4 × 3-pound guns; 3 × machine guns
- Armour: Protective deck of 1 in (2.5 cm) to 1.5 in (3.8 cm) steel over machinery and boilers.

HMS Torch was an Alert-class sloop of the Royal Navy, built at Sheerness Dockyard and launched in 1894. She served in Australia and New Zealand and was transferred to New Zealand as a training ship in 1917, being renamed HMS Firebrand at the same time. She was sold in 1920 and converted to a refrigerated ship with the new name Rama. She ran aground in the Chatham Islands in 1924 and was abandoned.

== Design ==
Alert and Torch were constructed of steel to a design by William White, the Royal Navy Director of Naval Construction. They were powered by a three-cylinder vertical triple expansion steam engine developing 1,400 horsepower and driving a single screw.

=== Sail Plan ===
The class was originally designed and built with barque-rigged sails, but both ships were re-rigged as barquentines before 1900 by removing the main yards.

=== Armament ===
Both ships of the class were armed with four 4-inch and four 3-pounder guns, and three machine guns.

== Construction ==
Torch was laid down at Sheerness Dockyard on 18 December 1893 and launched almost a year later on 28 December 1894. She was commissioned in October 1895.

== Service in Australian waters ==
Torch joined the Australian Station in February 1897, serving in New Zealand waters in 1898 and 1899. She was part of the naval escort for the visit of the Duke and Duchess of York to Australia and New Zealand aboard the chartered Royal liner HMS Ophir during 1901. After a refit, she recommissioned at Sydney on 29 November 1913. In July 1914 Torch, in company with the French cruiser Kersaint, was involved with a native uprising on the Island of Wala, Vanuatu. Five men were killed and four injured, and one native prisoner was captured. In August 1914 she became part of the New Zealand Division of the Pacific Station.

== Training ship Firebrand ==
On 16 August 1917 she was transferred to the New Zealand Government as the training ship HMS Firebrand. Torch paid off for the last time on 23 November 1914.

== Refrigerated ship Rama ==
She was sold in 1920, renamed Rama and fitted out as a refrigerated ship for the Chatham Islands fishing trade.

== Fate ==
While leaving harbour at Kaingaroa on Chatham Island on 17 November 1924 she struck an uncharted rock, and was beached and abandoned.
