= Red Alert =

Red Alert or red alert may refer to:

== Alert states ==
- Red alert, a high alert state
- Red Alert, the "attack imminent" alert signal for the US civil defense siren
- Red alert state, the most serious alert state in the UK BIKINI state system
- Red Alert (more commonly known as "Red Color"), an early warning civil defense siren for the Israel Defense Forces

== Film and television ==
- Red Alert (1977 film), a TV film
- Red Alert (2015 film), an Indian multilingual film
- Red Alert: The War Within, a 2010 Indian film
- Red Alert (game show), a British TV game show
- Red Alert, TV programs in the Pinoy True Stories series
- Red Alert (TV series), a 2025 Israeli TV series

== Gaming ==
- Red Alert (1981 video game), an Apple II video game published by Broderbund
- Last Alert, a 1989 shoot 'em up game known as Red Alert in Europe and Japan
- Command & Conquer: Red Alert (series), a series of real-time strategy video games

- Command & Conquer: Red Alert, the first game in the series

- Red Alert (Transformers), several characters in Transformers series

== Music ==
- Red Alert (band), a British band formed in 1979
- Kool DJ Red Alert, Antiguan-American hip hop DJ

=== Albums ===
- Red Alert (Agent 51 album) (1998)
- Red Alert (Red Garland album) (1978)
- Red Alert, a 2004 album by Sizzla
- Red Alert, a 2002 album by Warp 11

=== Songs ===
- "Red Alert" (song), a 1999 song by Basement Jaxx
- "Red Alert", a 2019 song by KSI and Randolph from New Age
- "Red Alert", a 1984 song by Quiet Riot from Condition Critical

== Other uses ==
- Red Alert (novel), a 1958 novel by Peter George
- Red Alert, a fictional organization in Mega Man X7
- Redd Alert, an indigenous street and prison gang in Canada
- Red Color, an Israeli early warning system

== See also ==
- Red Notice (disambiguation)
- Amber alert, a child abduction emergency alert
- General quarters
- Homeland Security Advisory System, with a "Severe (Red)" threat level
- Kool DJ Red Alert (born 1956), American disc jockey
