= Husvik =

Harbour on South Georgia

Coordinates: 54.18°S 36.7116°W

Husvik is a former whaling station on the north-central coast of South Georgia Island. It was one of three such stations in Stromness Bay, the other two being Stromness and Leith Harbour. Husvik initially began as a floating, offshore factory site in 1907. In 1910, a land station was constructed and remained operational until 1930; business resumed again between 1945 and 1960. Husvik Harbour was also the site of the third introduction of reindeer to South Georgia in 1925.

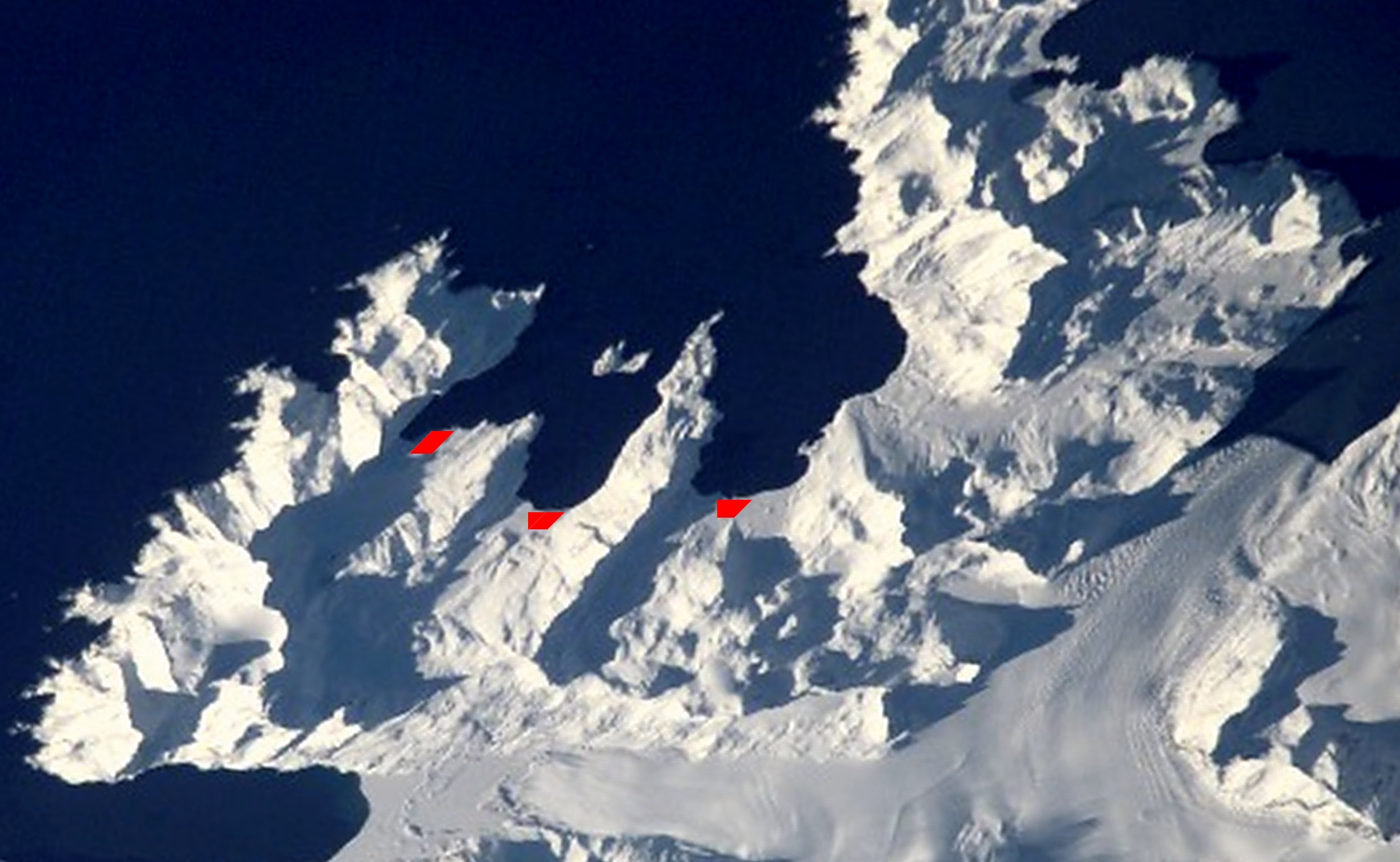
Stromness Bay with (left to right) Leith Harbour, Stromness and Husvik (NASA imagery).

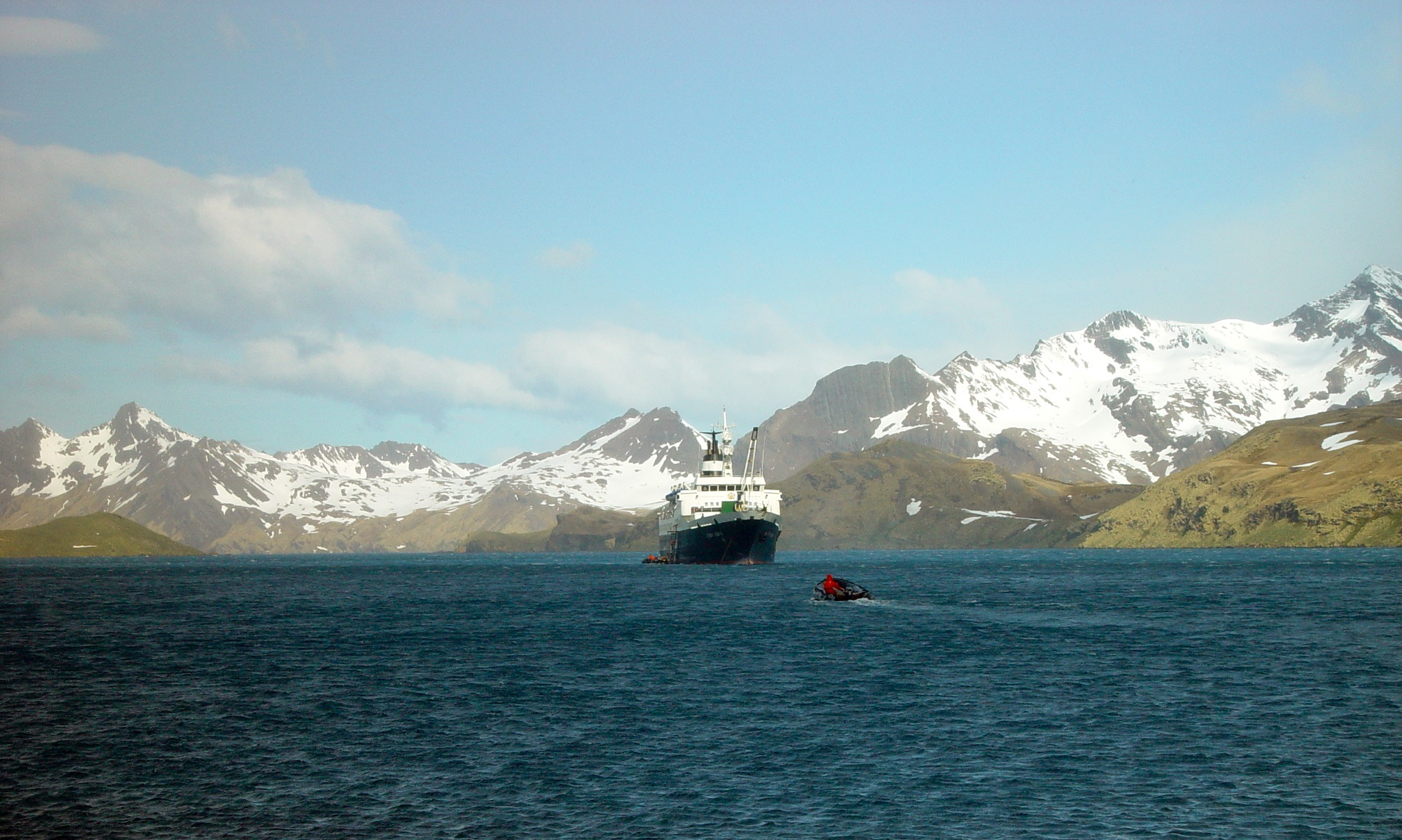
Husvik is on Stromness Bay

Historical and modern settlements of South Georgia Island

== History ==
The three whaling stations, Husvik, Stromness, and Leith, were linked by a rough track along the beach. During the whaling era, whalers from Stromness and Husvik would use it to get to Leith Harbour to use the cinema. The track can still be used, but in some places is rendered impassable by aggressively territorial fur seals during their breeding season (November and December).

The freezer plant was dismantled and moved to Grytviken in 1960, and whaling operations at Husvik permanently ceased. Afterwards, scientists from the British Antarctic Survey used the whaling managers' villa as a temporary shelter when doing work in the area until the mid-1990s. More recent inhabitants include the BSES expedition of December 2003, who used it as a base camp for a number of scientific and exploratory projects.

As with Leith, Stromness, and Prince Olav Harbour, the whaling station has been declared by the South Georgia Government as being too dangerous to visit, due to the danger from collapsing buildings and asbestos. Visitors must stay 200 m (656 ft) from the buildings and structures. Access to the Managers' Villa was prohibited in 2011 when the boundary of the 200m Prohibited Area was formalised in legislation.

The jetty is within the 200 m (656 ft) 'danger area' so is not usable, and is in a very dilapidated state. A colony of blue-eyed shags nests on its end each year.

In the southern summer of 2005/6, the South Georgia Heritage Trust hired a team of Norwegian craftsmen to restore some of the buildings at Husvik. In March 2006, the Manager's Villa, a building known as the "Radio Shack", and a small generator shed were successfully repaired and restored. Admiralty Peak is close to the station.

South of Husvik is a whaler's cemetery where 34 men were buried between 1924 and 1959.

== See also ==
- Alert Channel
- Alert Cove
- Brain Island – an island at the north side of Husvik Harbor.
