= Alert-class sloop =

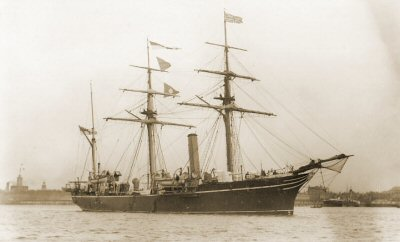
- Torch

Class overview
- Name: Alert-class sloops
- Builders: Sheerness Royal Dockyard
- Operators: Royal Navy
- Built: 1894
- In commission: 1894–1926
- Completed: 2
- Lost: 0

General characteristics
- Type: Screw steel sloop
- Displacement: 960 tons
- Length: 180 ft (55 m)
- Beam: 32 ft (9.8 m)
- Draught: 12 ft (3.7 m)
- Installed power: 1,400 hp (1,044 kW)
- Propulsion: Three-cylinder vertical triple-expansion steam engine; Single screw
- Sail plan: As built: Barque rigged; After about 1900: Barquentine rigged
- Complement: 107
- Armament: 6 × BL 4-inch (101.6 mm) guns; 4 × 3-pounder (47-mm) guns; 3 × machine guns
- Armour: Protective deck of 1 in (2.5 cm) to 1.5 in (3.8 cm) steel over machinery and boilers.

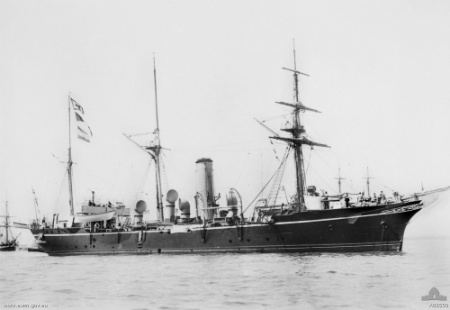
Torch rigged as a barquentine circa 1900

The Alert class was a two-ship class of 6-gun screw steel sloops built for the Royal Navy in 1894.

== Design ==
Alert and Torch were constructed of steel to a design by William White, the Royal Navy Director of Naval Construction. They were powered by a three-cylinder vertical triple-expansion steam engine developing 1,400 horsepower (1,000 kW) and driving a single screw.

=== Sail plan ===
The class was originally designed and built with barque-rigged sails, but both ships were re-rigged as barquentines before 1900 by removing the main yards.

=== Armament ===
Both ships of the class were armed with six 4-inch and four 3-pounder guns, and three machine guns.

== Ships ==
Name	Ship Builder	Launched	Fate
Alert	Sheerness Royal Dockyard	28 December 1894	Lent to the civil authority at Basra in 1918, and sold to them in 1926 for use as a pilot vessel. She was broken up in 1949
Torch	Sheerness Royal Dockyard	28 December 1894	Transferred to New Zealand Division of the Royal Navy on 16 August 1917 as Training Ship Firebrand. Renamed Rama. Ran aground on 17 November 1924 and abandoned

== Operational lives ==
Screw sloops of Alert's type had been obsolete for many years, but they remained ideal for patrolling Britain's far flung maritime empire.

=== HMS Alert ===
Alert served on the North America and West Indies Station, including a period in late 1902 and early 1903 when, under Commodore Montgomerie in HMS Charybdis, she enforced a blockade of the Venezuelan coast. During this period she captured the Venezuelan Zumbador. She was laid up for a time at Bermuda, but after 1910 served on the East Indies Station in the Persian Gulf, employed in the suppression of gun-running. She was sold to the civil authority at Basra in 1926 for use as a pilot vessel. She was broken up in 1949.

=== HMS Torch ===
Torch joined the Australian Station in February 1897, serving in New Zealand waters in 1898 and 1899. After a refit, she recommissioned at Sydney on 29 November 1913, and in August 1914 became part of the New Zealand Division of the Eastern Fleet. On 16 August 1917 she was transferred to the New Zealand Government as the Training Ship Firebrand. She was sold, renamed Rama and fitted out as a refrigerated ship for the Chatham Islands fishing trade. While approaching the Chatham Islands on 17 November 1924 she struck an uncharted rock, and was beached and abandoned.
