= List of Scottish place names in Canada =

This is a list of placenames in Scotland that have been applied to parts of Canada by Scottish emigrants or explorers.

For Nova Scotian names in Scottish Gaelic (not necessarily the same as the English versions) see Canadian communities with Scottish Gaelic speakers and Scottish Gaelic placenames in Canada

Note that, unless otherwise stated, province names are not Scottish.

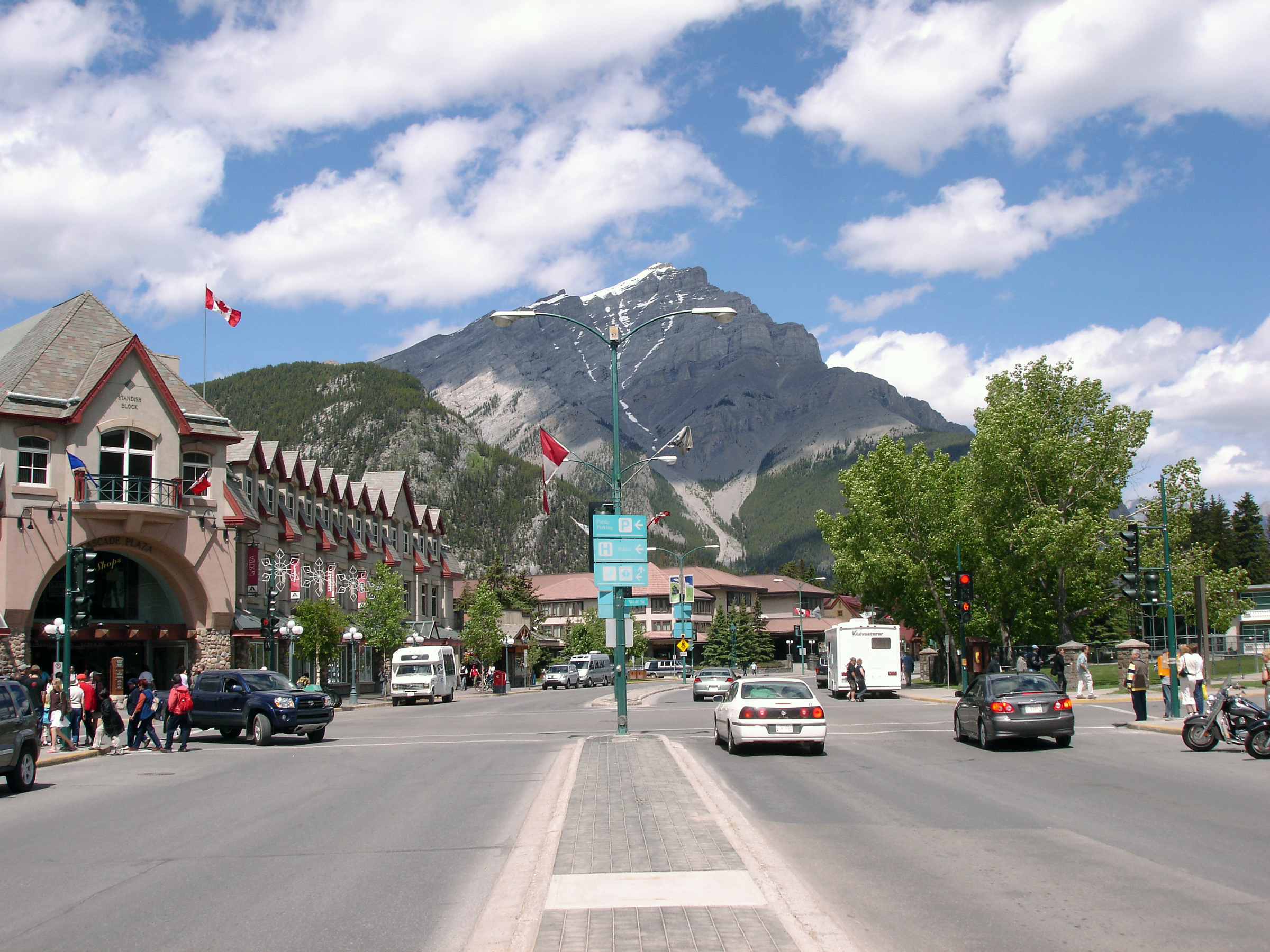
Banff, Alberta

== Alberta ==
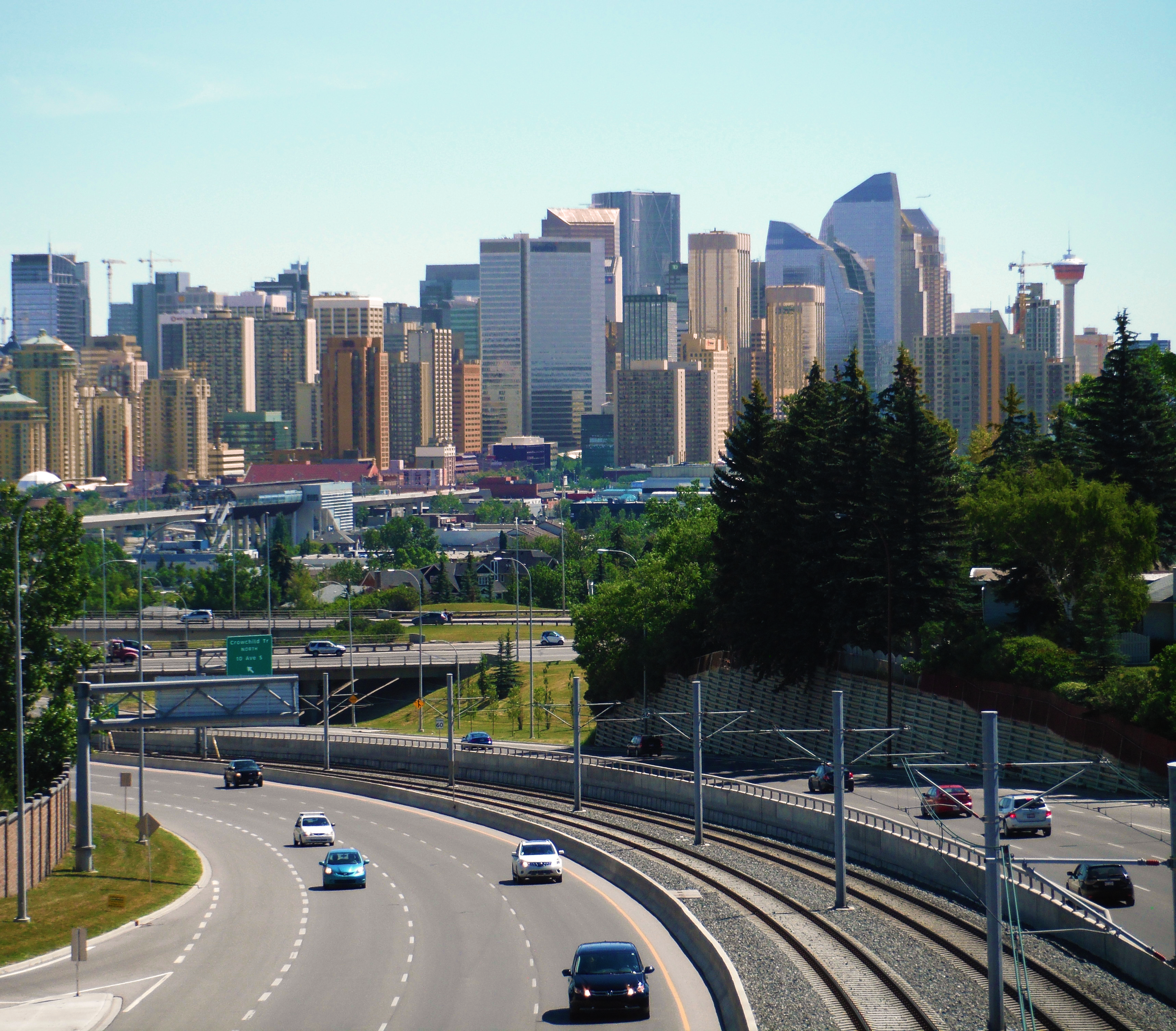
Calgary, Alberta

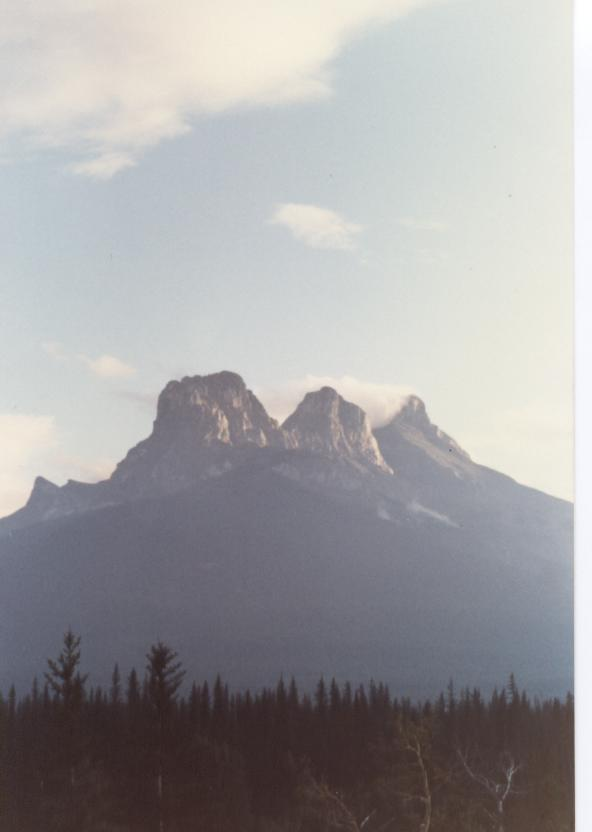
The three peaks of Three Sisters Mountain at Canmore, Alberta

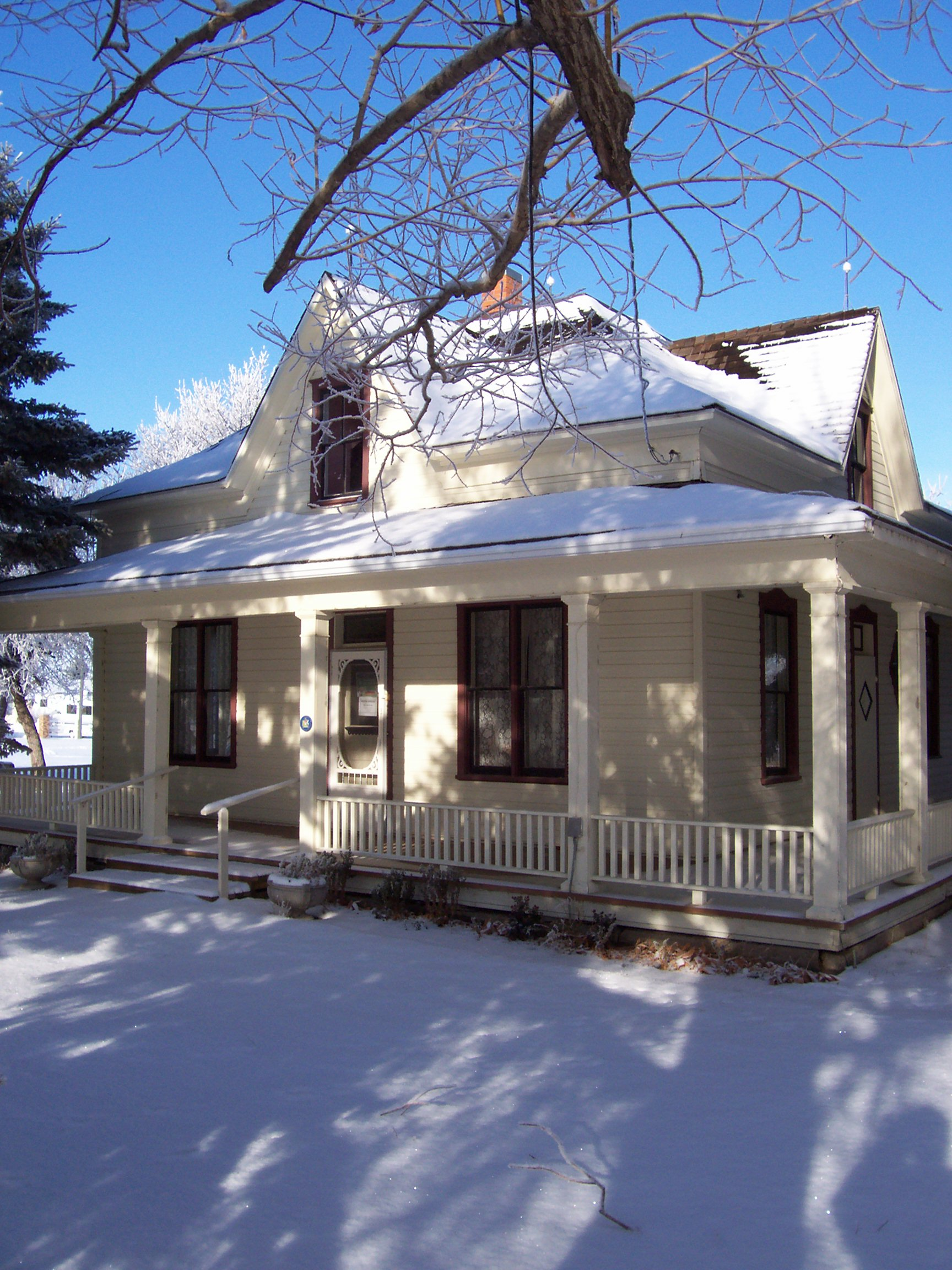
Michelsen Farmstead a Provincial Historic Site of Alberta, in the National Historic Site, Stirling Agricultural Village

- Airdrie
- Alness
- Alyth
- Ardmore
- Ardrossan
- Banff - named after town in northeast Scotland
- Bankhead (ghost town)
- Barrhead
- Blairmore
- Bon Accord (Bon Accord is the motto of Aberdeen)
- Bonnie Doon
- Bonnie Lake
- Broxburn
- Butedale Falls
- Caldwell (ghost town)
- Calgary - Calgary, Mull
- Canmore (named for King Malcolm Canmore)
- Carstairs
- Chisholm
- Clyde
- Colinton
- Coutts
- Craigmillar
- Craigmyle
- Cromdale
- Dalmuir
- Dunmore
- Dunvegan - named after town on Isle of Skye
- Eaglesham
- Erskine
- Ferintosh
- Fort Macleod
- Fort McMurray
- Gartly
- Halkirk (Halkirk)
- Hazeldean
- Holyrood (Holyrood)
- Innisfail
- Inverness River
- Irvine
- Islay
- Kilsyth
- Kirkcaldy
- Kirriemuir
- Lenzie
- Lomond (Loch Lomond)
- Mackenzie County
- Mallaig
- Mintlaw (ghost town)
- Mount Hector (after James Hector)
- Mount Lady Macdonald (after wife of John A. Macdonald)
- New Stirling (Maybutt)
- Pitlochrie
- Scotfield
- Stirling
- Strathcona County
- Strathcona

== British Columbia ==
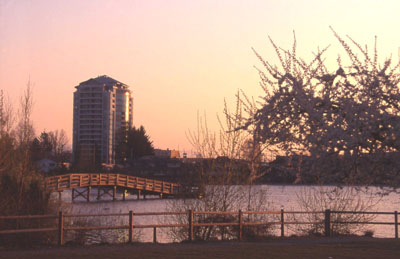
Abbotsford, BC

- Abbotsford (location of Sir Walter Scott's house). Suburbs include Aberdeen and Glen Mountain.
- Balfour (also known as "Balfour Bay")
- Butedale (ghost town)
- Cameron Bar 13
- Cape Scott Provincial Park
- Craigellachie
- Coldstream
- Cunningham Lake
- Davidson, a settlement west of Prince Rupert, British Columbia
- Duncan
- Dundarave (West Vancouver)
- Fintry Delta
- Invermere (inbhir + mere)
- Logan Lake
- Montrose
- Mount Brown (named after the Scottish botanist Robert Brown)
- Mount Lyell (named by James Hector in 1858 for the Scottish geologist Sir Charles Lyell)
- Mount Macdonald (after John A. Macdonald)
- Stewart
- Yarrow (River in Scottish Borders)

== Manitoba ==
- Angusville
- Argyle
- Carberry (named for Carberry Tower)
- East Kildonan
- Elgin
- Elphinstone
- Gretna
- MacGregor
- North Kildonan
- Old Kildonan
- Reston
- Rossburn
- Selkirk and East Selkirk
- St Andrews
- West Kildonan

Rural municipalities:

- Argyle
- Armstrong
- Cameron
- Clanwilliam
- Glenwood
- Grahamdale
- Lorne
- Macdonald
- Minto
- Morton
- Rossburn
- St Andrews
- Strathcona
- Strathclair
- Stuartburn

== New Brunswick ==
J.C. Van Horne Bridge crossing between Campbellton and Pointe-à-la-Croix, Quebec

Glenlevit Glencoe Dundee

- Aberdeen
- Atholville (Atholl)
- Balmoral
- Campbellton
- Dalhousie
- Drummond
- Dumbarton Parish
- Dumfries
- Dundas Parish
- Dundee
- Elgin
- Lower Kintore and Upper Kintore (Kintore)
- Melrose
- Minto
- New Scotland
- Perth-Andover
- Port Elgin (Elgin)
- Rothesay
- St Andrews

Caledonia Mountain, New Brunswick

== Newfoundland and Labrador ==
- Anderson's Cove
- Buchans and Lake Buchans
- Campbell's Creek
- Campbellton
- Hamilton River
- Highlands
- Holyrood (Holyrood is the site of the current Scottish Parliament)
- Iona
- Loch Leven
- Loch Lomond
- Lomond
- McKay's
- Melrose
- St. Andrew's

== Northwest Territories ==
The Northwest Territories also contain three places with Scottish surnames: Fort Simpson, Fort McPherson and Rae (Although now collectively known with Edzo as Behchoko).

- Cameron River Volcanic Belt
- District of Mackenzie
- Ferguson Lake (Kitikmeot Region)
- Finlayson Islands
- Fort McPherson (Murdoch McPherson)
- Fort Simpson (George Simpson)
- Mackenzie Highway
- Mackenzie Mountains and Mackenzie River
- Macmillan Pass
- Melville Island (named for Robert Dundas, 2nd Viscount Melville)

== Nova Scotia ==
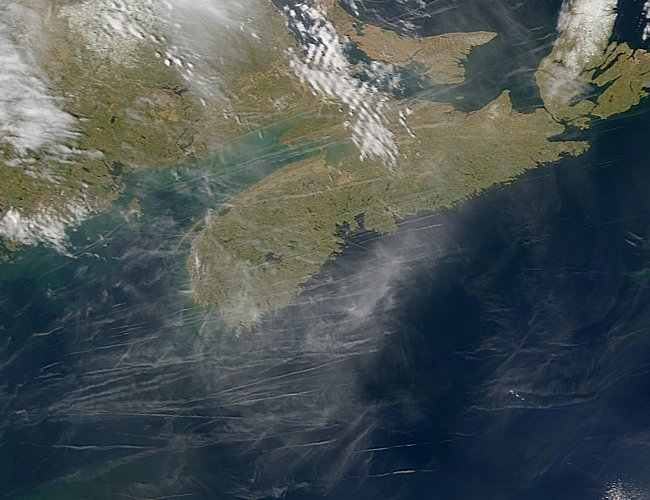
A satellite photo of Nova Scotia.

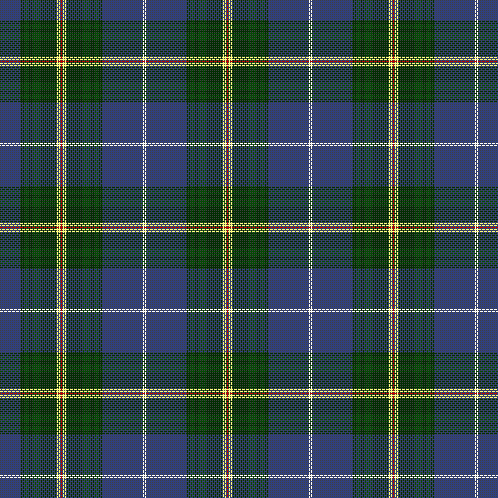
Tartan of Nova Scotia

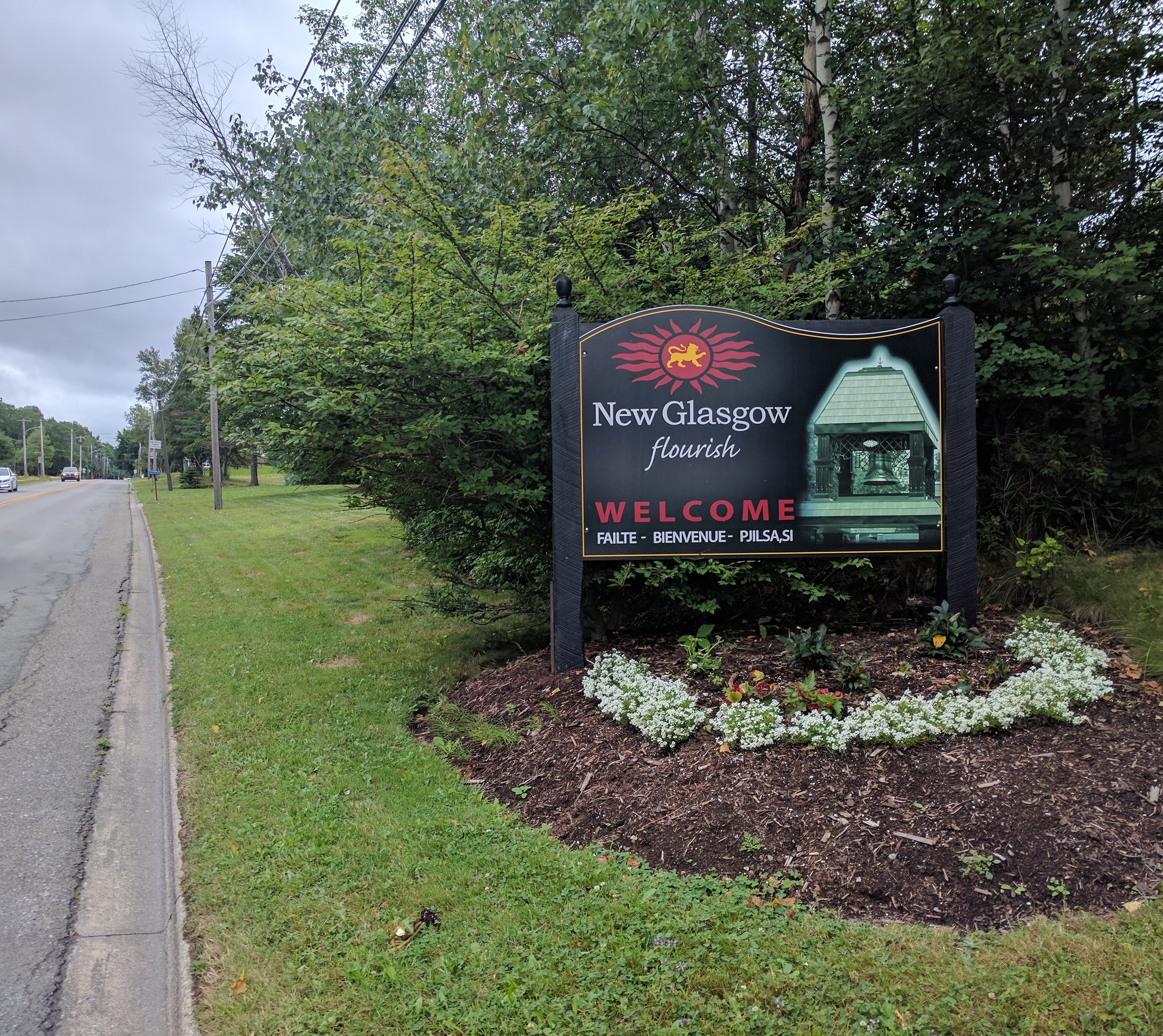
New Glasgow, Nova Scotia welcome sign

"Nova Scotia" is Latin for New Scotland. Nova Scotia's Gaelic name is Alba Nuadh, which also literally means "New Scotland".

- Aberdeen
- Argyle
- Arisaig
- Ben Eoin (from the Scottish Gaelic for "mountain of the birds")
- Beinn Bhreagh
- Beinn Scalpie
- Berwick
- Boisdale
- Broughton (ghost town)
- Caledonia
- Campbell
- Clydesdale
- Dundee
- Dunvegan
- Glencoe
- Glendale
- Granton
- Inverness
- Inverness County
- Iona
- Knoydart
- Lismore
- Lochaber
- Loch Broom
- Morar
- Loch Lomond
- New Edinburgh
- New Gairlock
- New Glasgow
- New Ross
- Portree
- Scotch Village
- Tantallon and Upper Tantallon

== Nunavut ==
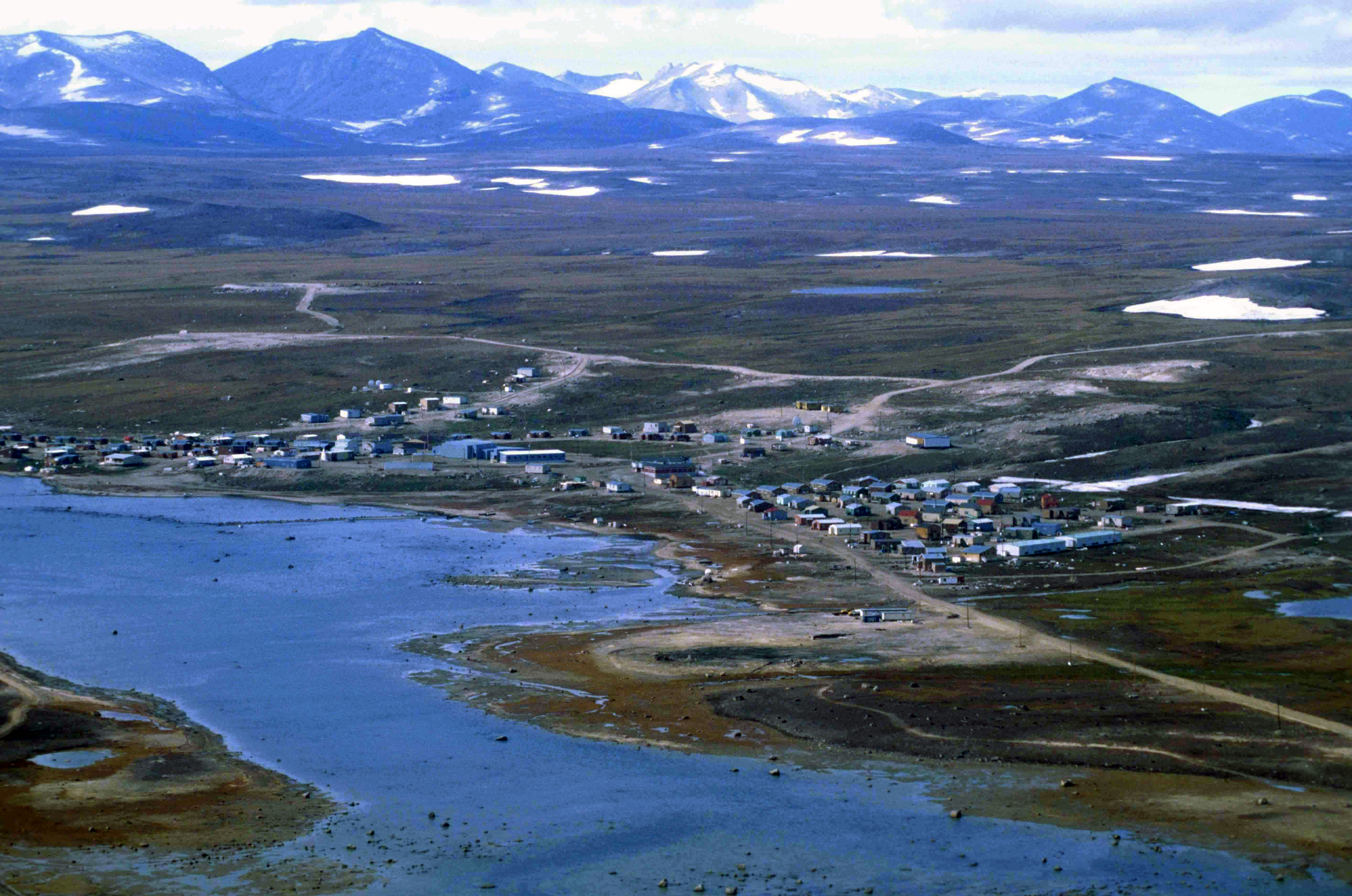
Clyde River, Nunavut

- Baillie-Hamilton Island
- Cameron Island
- Clyde Inlet and Clyde River
- Craig Harbour (on Ellesmere Island)
- Dundas Harbour
- Edinburgh Island (PIN-DA)
- Eglinton Island
- Graham Island
- Houston Stewart Island
- Kuugaarjuk Migratory Bird Sanctuary (formerly the McConnell River Migratory Bird Sanctuary) and McConnell River
- Mackar Inlet (CAM-5)
- Mackenzie hotspot and Mackenzie dike swarm
- Melville Island (named for Robert Dundas, 2nd Viscount Melville)
  - Dundas Peninsula (part of Melville Island)
- Melville Peninsula
- Rankin Inlet
- Simpson Lake (CAM-D)

== Ontario ==
West Elgin Arena

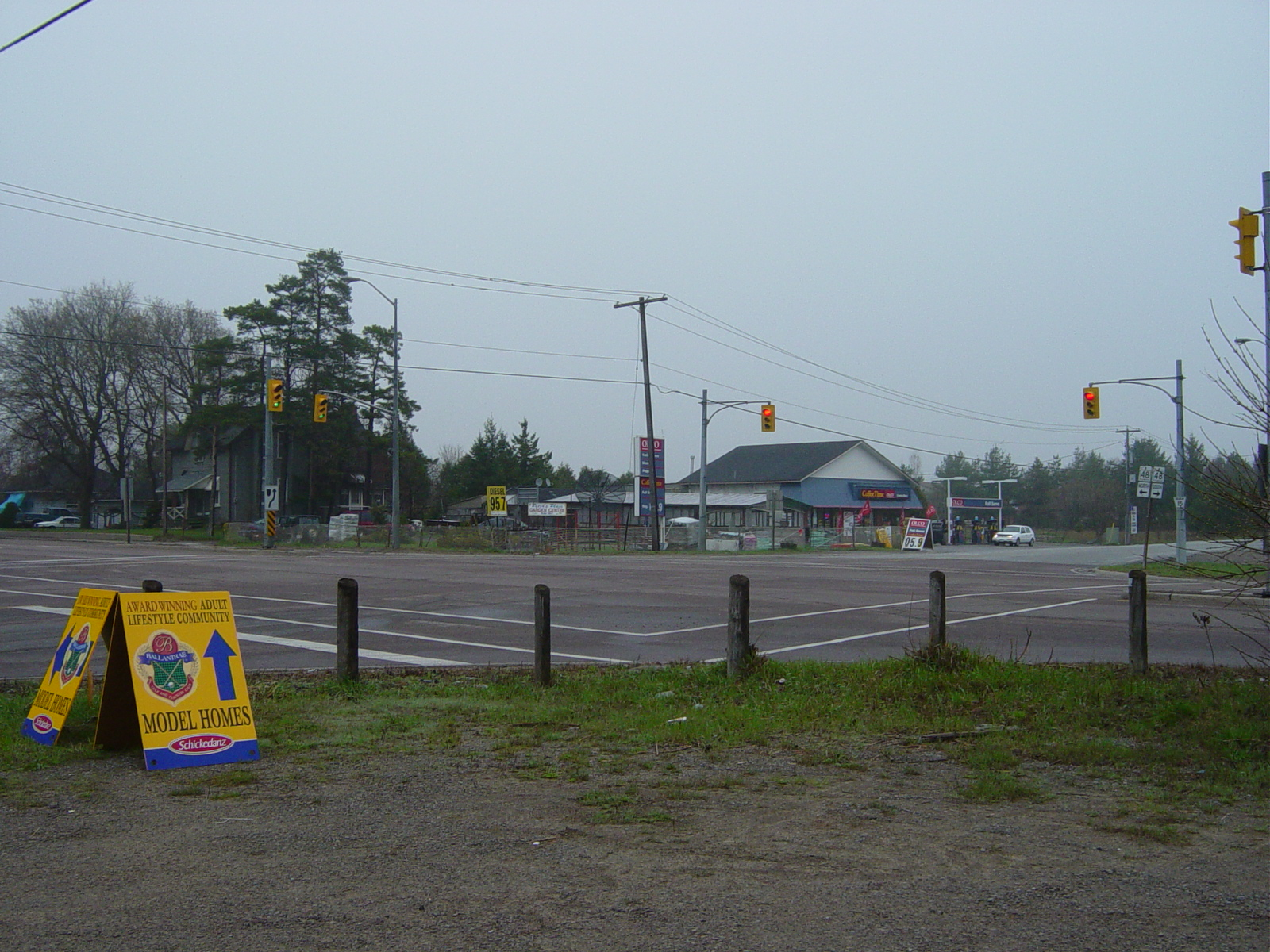
Ballantrae, Ontario

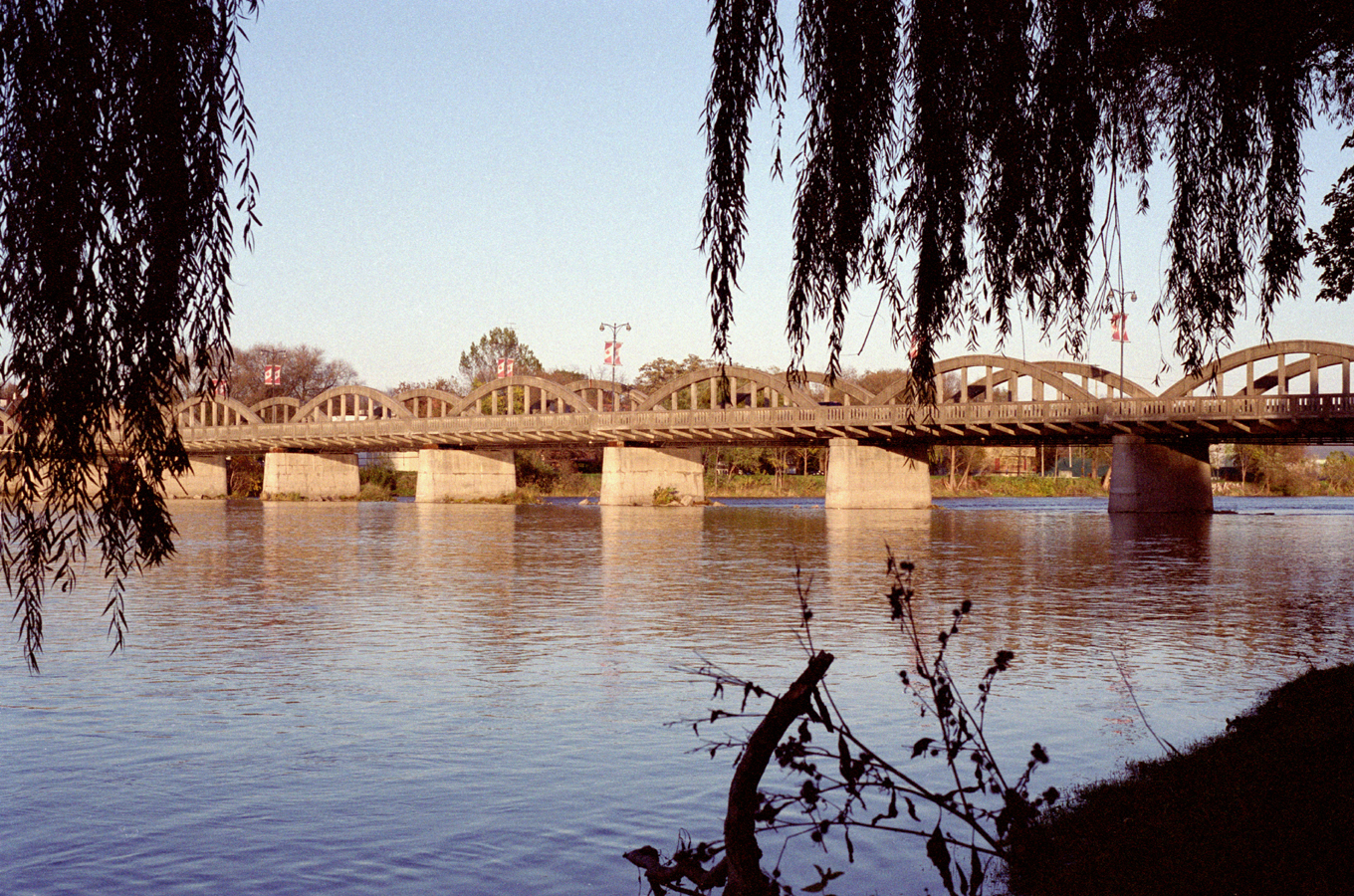
The Grand River Bridge, which carries Argyle St. over the Grand River in Caledonia, Ontario

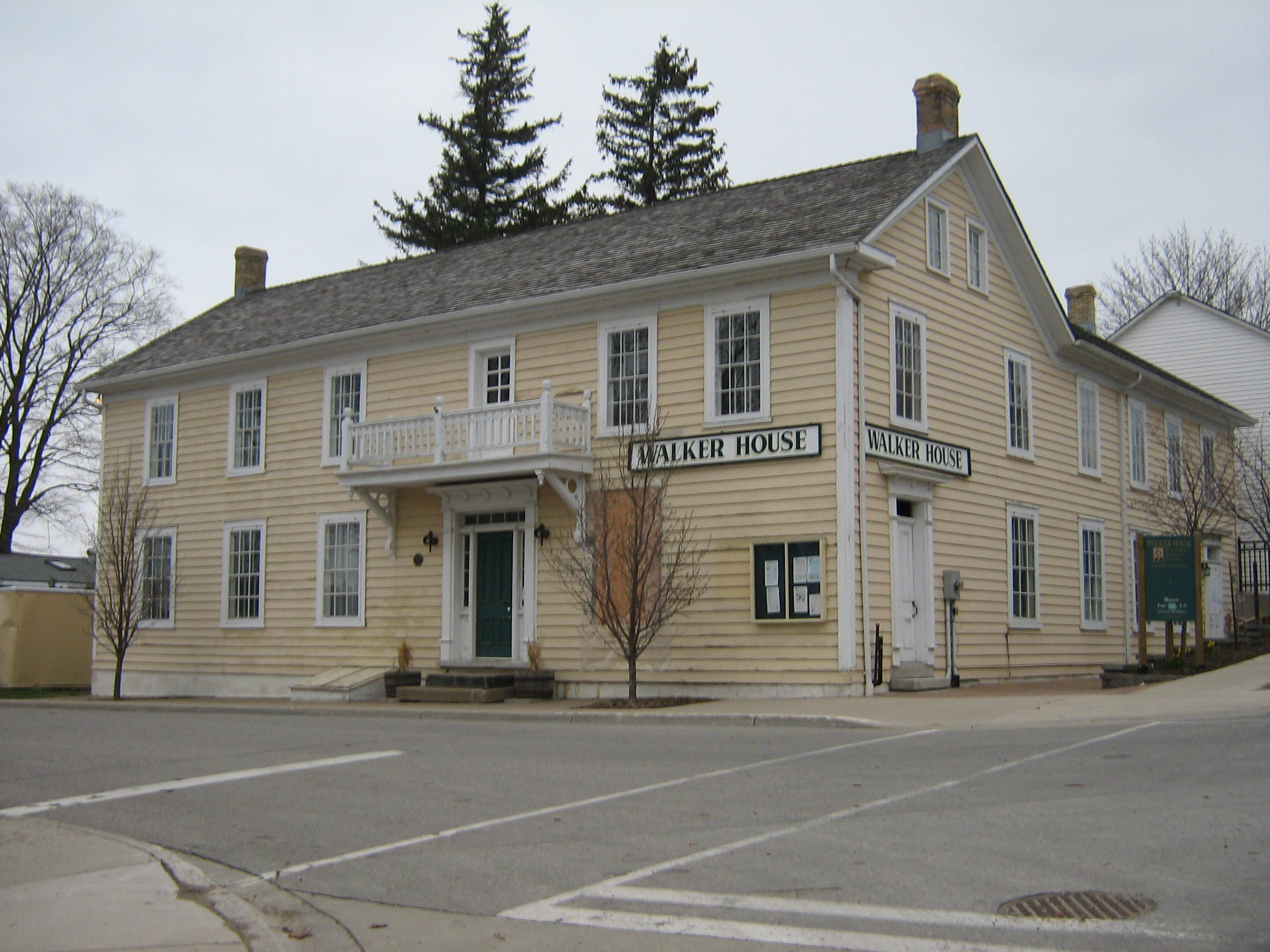
The Walker House, oldest house in Kincardine, Ontario

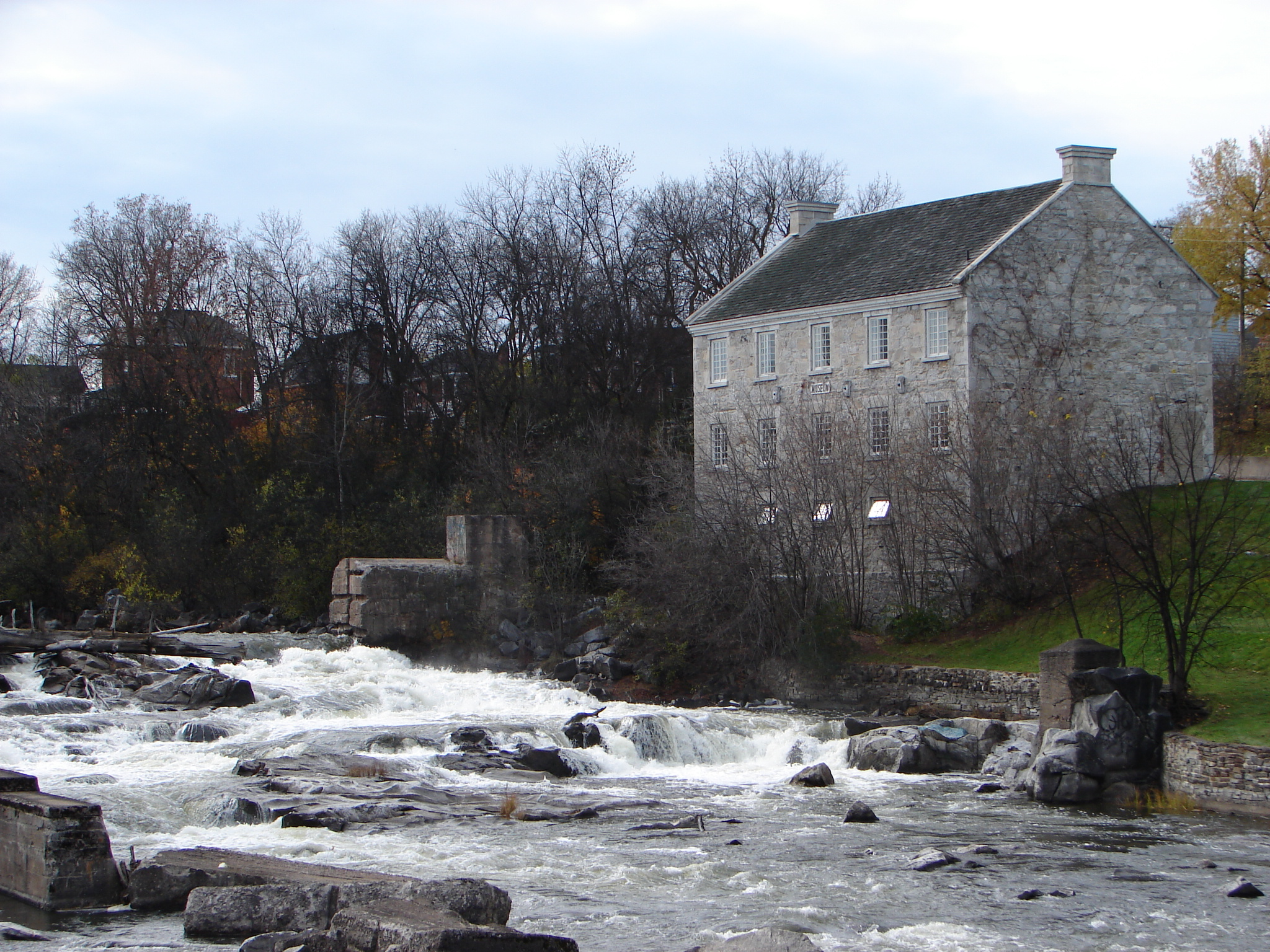
The McDougall Mill Museum by the Bonnechere River, Renfrew Ontario

Drummond

- Aberdeen, Grey County
- Aberdeen, Prescott and Russell County
- Aberfeldy
- Aberfoyle
- Achray
- Ailsa Craig
- Alloa
- Angus
- Angus Glen
- Ardbeg
- Ardoch
- Armadale
- Armstrong, Thunder Bay District
- Armstrong Township, Armstrong Corners and Armstrong Mills
- Arnprior
- Arranvale (Isle of Arran)
- Athol, Prince Edward County
- Athol, Stormont, Dundas and Glengarry United Counties
- Avonmore
- Ayr
- Ayton
- Badenoch
- Bainsville
- Bairds
- Ballantrae
- Ballinafad
- Bannockburn
- Baxter
- Bell Ewart
- Berriedale (Berriedale, Sutherland)
- Berwick
- Bisset Creek
- Bothwell
- Boyds (Surname, derived from Bute)
- Brechin
- Bruce Mines
- Bruce Peninsula
- Bruce Station
- Cairngorm
- Caledon
- Caledon East
- Caledonia
- Caledonia Springs
- Callander
- Campbellcroft
- Campbellford
- Campbellville
- Cargill
- Clachan
- Cockburn Island
- Coldstream
- Colgan
- Craigleith
- Craigmont
- Crieff
- Cromarty
- Crombie
- Cruikshank
- Dalhousie Lake
- Dalhousie Mills
- Dalkeith
- Dalmeny
- Dalrymple
- Doon
- Drummond
- Dundas
- Dundonald
- Dunedin (Dunedin, poetic name for Edinburgh/Dun Eideann)
- Dunkeld
- Dunvegan
- Dysart et al. (Dysart)
- East Tay Point (Tay)
- Elgin
- Elgin County, Ontario
- Farquhar
- Fergus
- Ferguslea
- Ferguson Corners, Ferguson Falls and Fergusons Beach
- Forfar
- Galbraith
- Gillies Hill
- Gilmour
- Glasgow
- Glen
- Glen Buell
- Glenburn
- Glenburnie
- Glen Cross
- Glenfield
- Glen Huron
- Glencairn
- Glencoe
- Glenelg Centre
- Glen Major
- Glen Nevis
- Glenora
- Glen Robertson
- Glenview
- Glenville
- Glen Williams
- Gorrie
- Greenock
- Haliburton
- Hamilton
- Hampden
- Henderson
- Innerkip
- Inverary
- Inverhuron (inbhir, meaning river mouth + Huron)
- Invermay
- Iona and Iona Station
- Jura, Ontario
- Katrine (Loch Katrine)
- Kilsyth
- Kinburn
- Kincardine
- Kinghorn
- Kinmount
- Kintail
- Kirkfield
- Laggan
- Laird
- Lake Dalrymple (Dalrymple)
- Lamlash
- Lammermoor
- Lanark
- Leith
- Lochalsh, Algoma District
- Lochalsh, Huron County
- Lochwinnoch
- Lowther
- McAlpine Corners
- Macdiarmid
- MacDonald Bay
- MacDonald's Grove
- MacDuff
- MacGillivrays Bridge
- Mackenzie
- MacKenzie Point
- MacLarens Landing
- MacLean Park
- MacTier
- Maitland, Huron County
- Maitland, United Counties of Leeds and Grenville
- Malcolm
- Maxwell, Grey County
- Maxwell, Hastings County
- Maxwells
- Minto
- Moffat
- Monteith
- Moray
- Morven
- Nairn, Middlesex County
- Nairn Centre
- Napier
- New Dundee
- New Edinburgh
- New Glasgow
- New Scotland, Chatham-Kent
- New Scotland, Regional Municipality of York
- Paisley
- Perth
- Perth Road Village
- Port Elgin
- Raith
- Rankin, Nipissing District
- Rankin, Renfrew County
- Rannoch
- Ratho
- Renfew, named for Renfrewshire
- Renfrew Junction
- Rutherford
- Rutherglen
- Scone
- Scotch Bush, Hastings County and Scotch Bush, Renfrew County
- Scotch Corners
- Scotia
- Selkirk
- Speyside - Early settlers believed a local creek resembled the River Spey.
- St. Andrews
- Staffa, Perth County
- Strathroy, near London
- Stirling
- Tarbert
- Tartan
- Tay
- Tobermory, Ontario
- Tweed
- Wallaceburg, Chatham-Kent (William Wallace)
- West Elgin (Elgin)
- West Lorne (Lorne)
- Wick

== Prince Edward Island ==
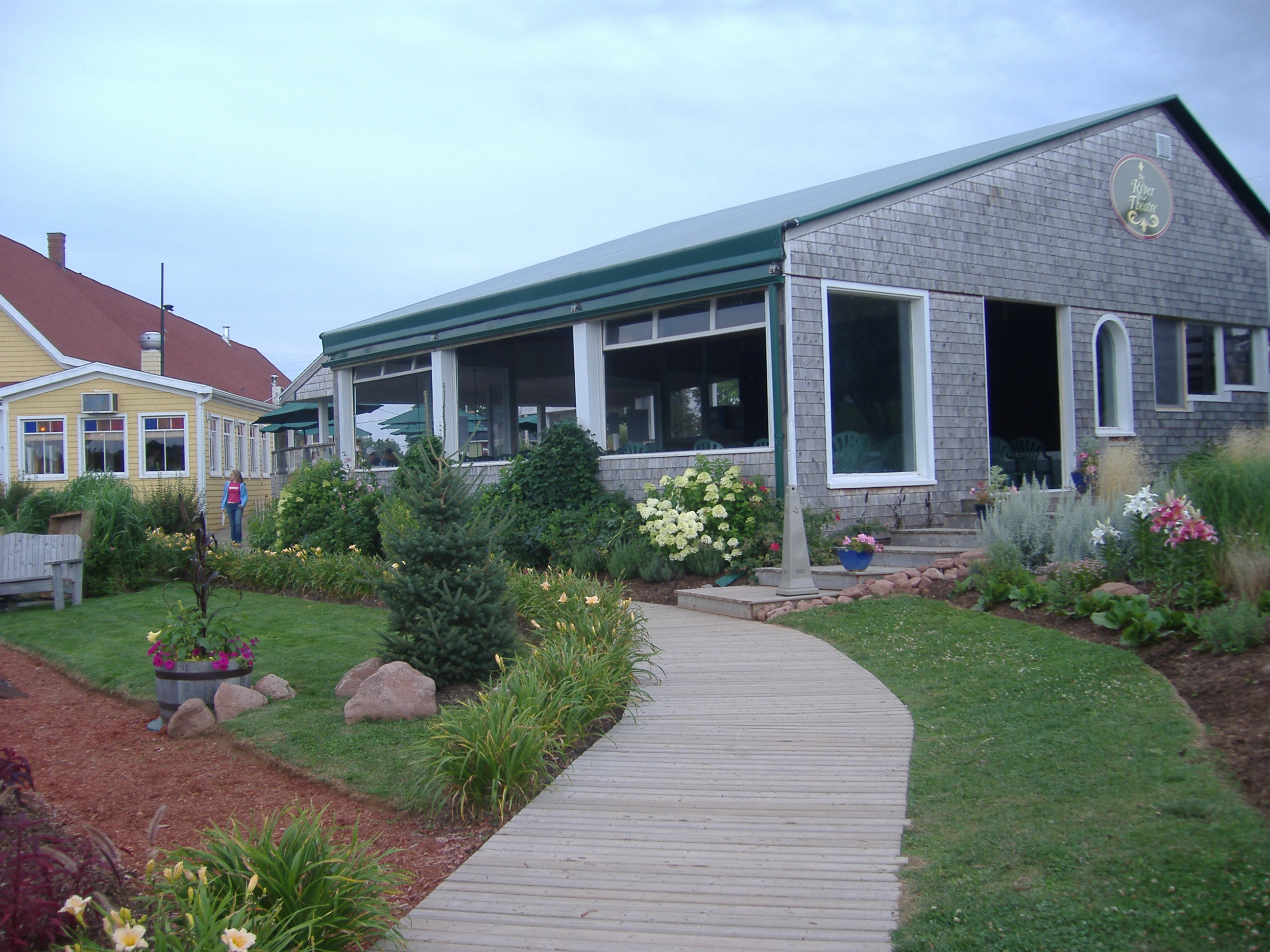
The Prince Edward Island Preserve Company in New Glasgow

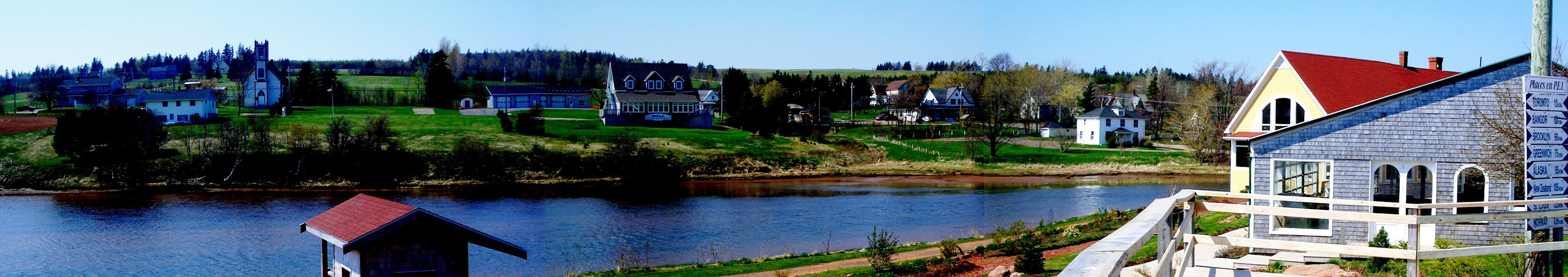
Panorama of a river bank in New Glasgow.

- Breadalbane
- Glenfinnan Island (Prince Edward Island) and Glenfinnan River
- Greenmount-Montrose
- Inverness
- Mount Stewart
- Lennox Island
- MacDonalds River
- Montrose River
- Murray River
- New Glasgow
- St Andrews
- Uigg, Prince Edward Island

== Quebec ==
- Abercorn
- Campbell's Bay
- Denholm
- Drummondville and Drummond RCM
- Duncan Lake (Quebec)
- Dundee
- East Angus
- Elgin
- Hampden
- Inverness
- Lennoxville
- Lochaber
- Lochaber-Partie-Ouest
- MacMasterville
- MacNider
- Napierville and Les Jardins de Napierville
- Scotstown
- Stornoway
- Thurso
- Tingwick

== Saskatchewan ==
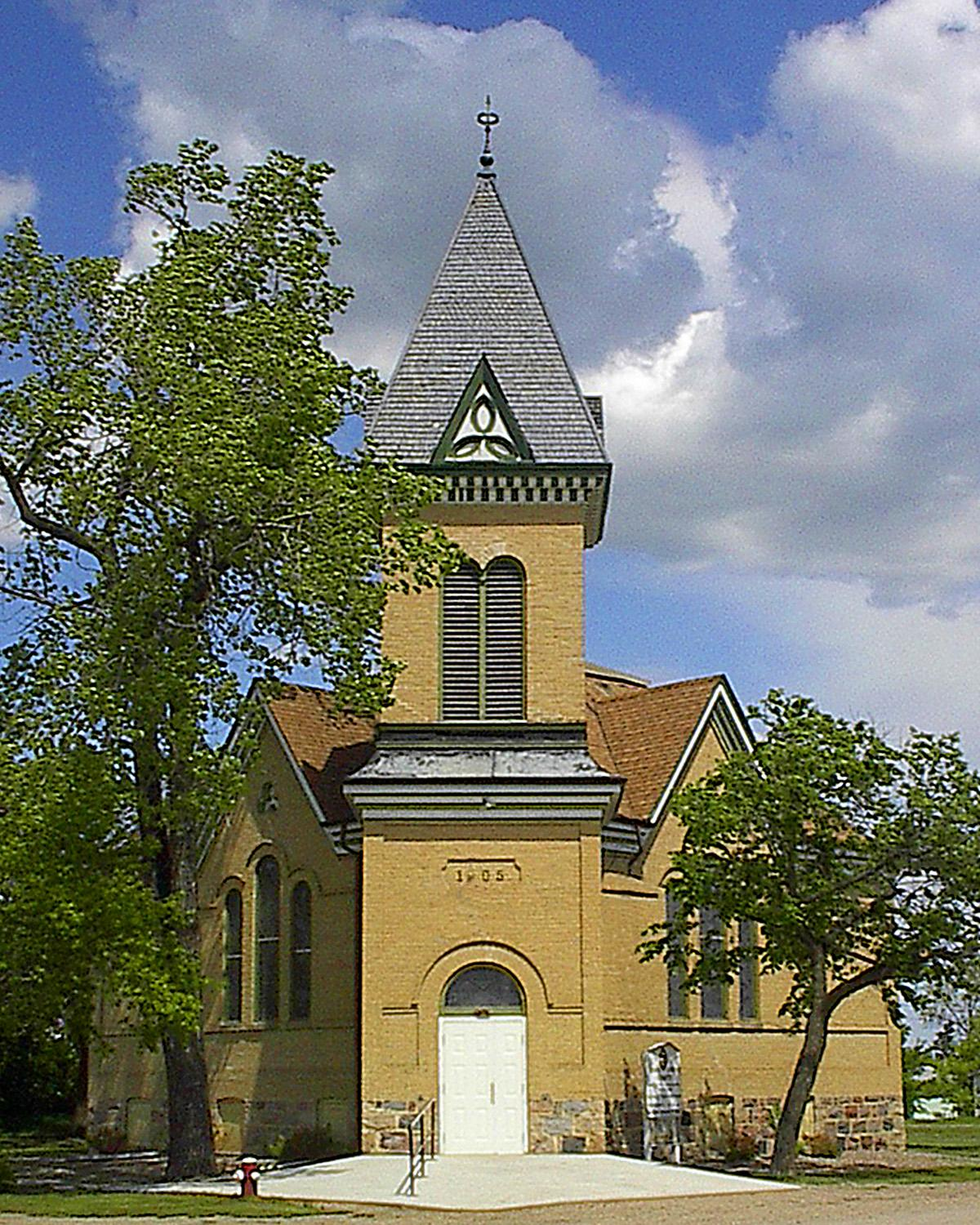
Church at Abernethy, Saskatchewan

- Aberdeen and Aberdeen No. 373
- Abernethy and Abernethy No. 186
- Ancrum
- Argyle No. 1
- Arran
- Balcarres
- Balgonie
- Biggar
- Birsay
- Calder
- Calderbank
- Carmichael No. 109
- Carnduff
- Clansman
- Colonsay and Colonsay No. 342
- Crichton
- Cupar
- Dalmeny
- Davidson
- Dysart
- Fairy Glen
- Fife Lake
- Girvin
- Glen Ewen
- Glenavon
- Glenside
- Govan
- Inchkeith
- Innes
- Invergordon No. 430
- Invermay
- Isbister's Settlement (former name of Prince Albert)
- Jedburgh
- Kyle
- Kylemore
- Laird
- Lomond No. 37
- Lumsden and Lumsden No. 189
- Markinch
- Melville
- Mortlach
- Neidpath
- Oban
- Orkney and Orkney No. 244
- Peebles
- Ravenscrag
- Saltcoats
- Scotsguard
- Simpson
- St. Boswells
- Tiree

The town of Coronach was originally named after a horse; however, the original meaning of coronach is a Gaelic lament.

== Yukon ==
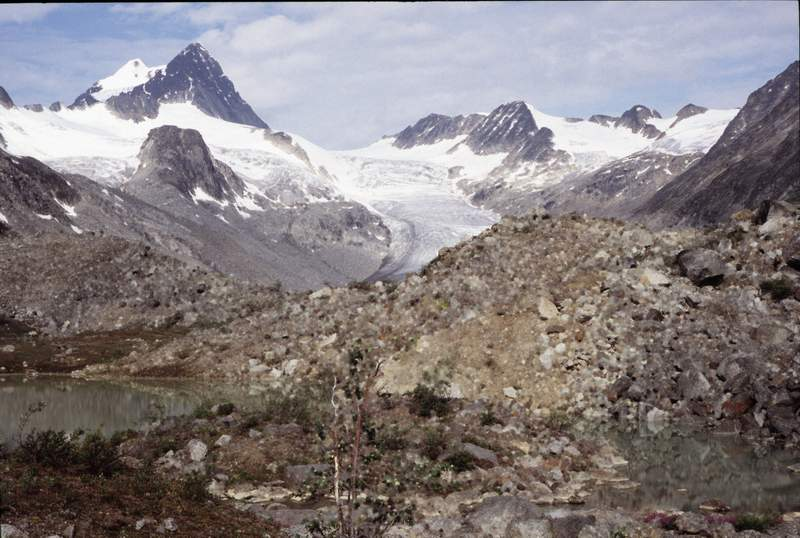
Mackenzie Mountains

- Bell River
- Dawson City
- Fort Selkirk
- Mackenzie Mountains
- Mount Logan
  - Houston's Peak
- Mount Lorne
- Mount Macaulay
- Macmillan River
- Ogilvie Mountains
- Ogilvie River
- Robert Campbell Highway
- Ross River
- Stewart River

== See also ==
- List of Spanish place names in Canada
- Locations in Canada with an English name
