= Lochalsh, Ontario =

Lochalsh, Ontario may refer to:

- Lochalsh, Algoma District, Ontario
- Lochalsh, Huron County, Ontario
