= Lochalsh (disambiguation) =

Lochalsh is a district of mainland Scotland, currently part of the Highland council area

Lochalsh may also refer to:

- Lochalsh, Algoma District, Ontario, a ghost town and rail siding located at the very south end of Wabatongushi Lake
- Lochalsh, Huron County, Ontario, a community in Ontario
- Loch Alsh, a sea inlet between the isle of Skye and mainland Scotland
- Kyle of Lochalsh, a village in Lochalsh, Scotland
