= Speyside =

Speyside can refer to:

- Speyside, Ontario, a settlement in Ontario
- Strathspey, Scotland, a region near the River Spey known for its whisky
  - Speyside single malts, the type of whisky produced in Strathspey
- Speyside, Trinidad and Tobago in Trinidad and Tobago
- "Speyside", a 2024 song by Bon Iver from Sable
