= Disappearance of Marianne Schuett =

1967 missing child case in Canada

Marianne Schuett
- Born: 29 September 1956
- Disappeared: 27 April 1967 (aged 10); Kilbride, Ontario, Canada
- Known for: Unsolved disappearance

Marianne Schuett (born 29 September 1956) was a Canadian schoolgirl who disappeared from Kilbride, Ontario, on 27 April 1967. The ten-year-old was last seen near her school speaking with a man in a dark-coloured European automobile, possibly a Renault. An extensive search involving thousands of people failed to locate her. A blue running shoe was found near Speyside, Ontario. Investigative efforts have continued in the decades after her disappearance.

== Case ==
Marianne Schuett was born on 29 September 1956. She was a middle child with two brothers. Her family moved from Hespeler, Ontario to Kilbride in 1965. On Thursday, 27 April 1967, she stayed after school to work on a project with a classmate and planned to walk home as she lived in close proximity to her school.

Several witnessed reported seeing Marianne near the school beside a dark-coloured European car. Witnesses described its driver as a white man with a thin face who wore glasses and a hat. A teacher at the school reported seeing Marianne get in the vehicle. Police asked Blaine Macdonald, a newspaper cartoonist, to sketch out the car witnesses described; investigators believed the resulting drawing resembled a Renault 4 station wagon.

The initial search became one of the largest missing-person searches conducted in Ontario at the time. An estimated 18,000 people participated. The day after her disappearance, a blue running shoe was found near Speyside. The Globe and Mail reported in 1967 that the forensic laboratory in Toronto indicated it belonged to Marianne. Marianne's parents published a public appeal asking whoever was responsible to disclose what happened to their daughter. In 1977, police questioned a man in Montreal about the case. More searches were conducted north of Milton, Ontario in 2021.

=== Person of interest ===
In 1991, The Hamilton Spectator reported that police had investigated an unnamed man, who had reportedly purchased a 1967 Renault shortly before Schuett disappeared. In 1972, he had attempted to abduct a 14-year-old girl from Burlington; he had also been accused of sexually assaulting two girls. The man died by suicide in January 1991, before investigators could question him about Marianne's disappearance.

== Later developments and memorial ==
Schuett's father died in 1999 and her mother died in 2022. On 2 October 2021, a memorial bench was dedicated to her with support from the Kilbride History Group and Marianne's surviving family members.
