= List of Spanish place names in Canada =

This is a list of geopolitical entities, geographical features, localities, and other places in Canada with names that originate from the Spanish language.

== Table ==
Place	Province/territory	English translation	Notes
Alameda	Saskatchewan	"poplar grove"	
Alhambra	Alberta	N/A	Named for the Alhambra, the palace/fortress in Granada
Aristazabal Island	British Columbia	N/A	Named for the Spanish capitain, Gabriel de Aristazábal
Casa Loma	Ontario	"hill house"	A mansion in Toronto that was originally the residence of financier Henry Pellatt and is now a museum.
Cordero Channel	British Columbia	N/A	Named after José Cardero
Corunna	Ontario	N/A	Named after the Battle of Corunna
Del Bonita	Alberta	"of the pretty"	
Deloro	Ontario	"of gold"	Location of a gold mine.
Eldorado	Ontario	"the golden"	Became the site of Ontario's first gold rush in August 1866.
Eldorado	Saskatchewan	"the golden"	Now a ghost town.
Espanola	Ontario	feminine form of "Spanish"	The story behind the town’s name is that in the mid-18th century, a local Ojibwe man married a white, Spanish-speaking woman and they taught their children to speak Spanish. When French explorers came to the area and heard the locals speaking Spanish, they remarked, "espagnole" (the French word for "Spanish"). This was later anglicized to "Espanola" and the nearby river was named the Spanish River.
Flores Island	British Columbia	"Flores" means "flowers".	Named in honour of Manuel Antonio Flórez, the 51st viceroy of New Spain.
Galiano Island	British Columbia	N/A	Named for Spanish explorer Dionisio Alcalá Galiano.
Granada	Alberta	N/A	
Juan de Fuca Strait	British Columbia	N/A	Named for Ioánnis Fokás, a Greek explorer who sailed in the service of Spain, and whose name was translated into Spanish as "Juan de Fuca". Forms part of the boundary between the Canadian province of British Columbia and the American state of Washington.
Lobo	Ontario	"wolf"	Township now amalgamated into Middlesex Centre. Named in 1821, one of several Spanish names given by General Sir Peregrine Maitland, Lt. Governor of Upper Canada (1818-28) and Lt. Governor of Nova Scotia (1828-34). He developed a fondness for Spanish during the Peninsula Campaign and gave Spanish names to several Canadian places. See also Mariposa, Orillia, Oro, Sombra, and Zorra.
Mariposa	Ontario	"butterfly"	A former township, now part of the City of Kawartha Lakes, and a community within that former township. Named by Peregrine Maitland in 1820.
Mariposa Beach	Ontario	"butterfly"	A community within the Township of Ramara.
Mariposa No. 350	Saskatchewan	"butterfly"	A rural municipality in Saskatchewan.
Murillo	Ontario	N/A	Named for Bartolomé Esteban Murillo, a Spanish artist.
Orillia	Ontario	"bank" or "shore"	Township named in 1822 by Peregrine Maitland; the city borrowed the name in 1835.
Oro	Ontario	"gold"	Oro Township merged into Oro-Medonte in 1994. Named by Peregrine Maitland in 1820 after Río de Oro in the Spanish Sahara (now Western Sahara).
Oso	Ontario	"bear"	Oso Township amalgamated into Central Frontenac in 1998. Named by Peregrine Maitland in 1823.
Placentia	Newfoundland and Labrador	N/A	Named for either Soraluze-Placencia de las Armas, Spain or Plentzia, Spain
Port Alberni	British Columbia	N/A	Port Alberni was named for Captain Don Pedro de Alberni, a Spanish officer, who commanded Fort San Miguel at Nootka Sound on Vancouver Island's west coast from 1790 to 1792.Port Alberni
Ramara	Ontario	"Rama" means "branch" and "mara" means "sea".	A township formed in 1994 by the amalgamation of Rama Township and Mara Township. The origins of the names of these townships are unclear, and another possible explanation for the origins of their names is that they are named for places in the Bible: Ramah and Marah, respectively.
St-Alphonse-Rodriguez	Québec	N/A	Named for Alphonsus Rodriguez, a Spanish Catholic saint.
Sombra	Ontario	"shade"	Named by Pregrine Maitland in 1822 because he found the place heavily wooded.
Tofino	British Columbia	N/A	Named for nearby Tofino Inlet, which was named in 1792 by Spanish explorers Dionisio Alcalá Galiano and Cayetano Valdés y Flores for Admiral Vicente Tofiño, under whom Galiano had learned cartography.
Zayas Island	British Columbia	N/A	Named after the second pilot of Jacinto Caamaño, Juan Zayas, during the 1792 expedition.
Zeballos	British Columbia	N/A	Named after Ciriaco Ceballos, a Spanish sailor, explorer and cartographer.
Zorra	Ontario	"vixen"	Named by Peregrine Maitland.

== See also ==
- List of place names in Canada of aboriginal origin
- List of U.S. place names of Spanish origin
- Locations in Canada with an English name
- Scottish place names in Canada
- List of Scottish Gaelic place names in Canada
- List of Canadian place names of Ukrainian origin
- Labrador, a region in Canada whose name is of Portuguese origin
