= Storyland (Ontario) =

Children's theme park in Ontario, Canada

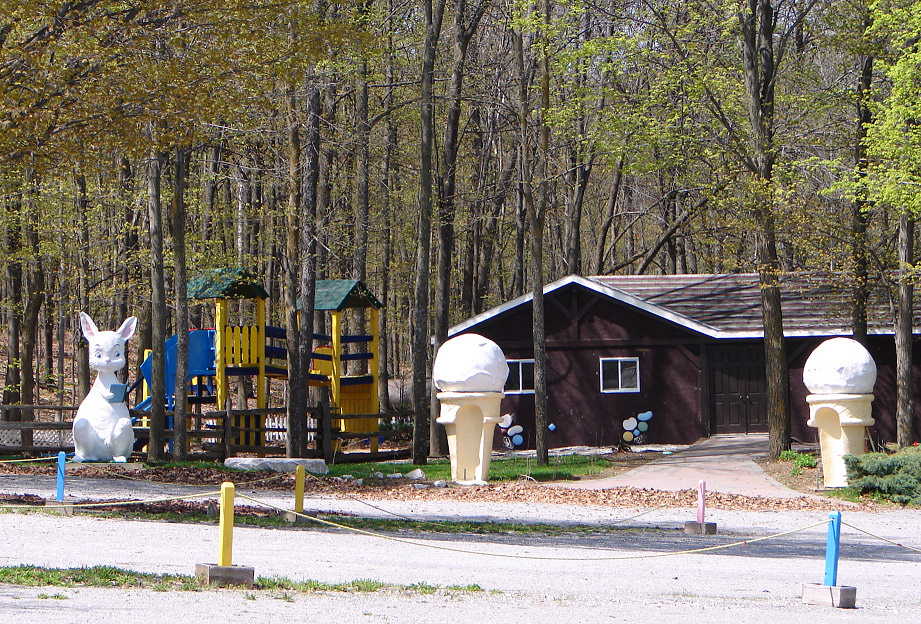
- Main entrance
- Interactive map of Storyland
- Location: Renfrew, Ontario, Canada
- Coordinates: 45.559166°N 76.670022°W
- Opened: 1966
- Closed: 2011

Attractions
- Total: 7

Storyland was a children’s theme park located northwest of Ottawa, Ontario, Canada, near the town of Renfrew in Horton Township featuring depictions of classic fairy tale scenes. The park featured a mini-golf course, a small water park, live performers, playgrounds, small rides, and staff dressed as fairy tale characters. It is near the Champlain Lookout in Brown's Bay, where Samuel de Champlain made land. In 1953 a large rock was found in the area bearing a chiselled inscription: "Champlain Juin 2, 1613". However the authenticity of the inscription has been brought into question by the date format. The Champlain Lookout was a part of the landscape long before Storyland was founded. The park closed after the 2011 season and was sold in 2013. It has since transformed into a glamping campground. Elements Luxury Tented Camp and Nature Spa have been set up on the acreage.

== History ==
Storyland was founded by Durk and Bonnie Heyda, two immigrants from the Netherlands on 175 acres (0.71 km^{2}). They were unable to have children so they chose instead to build story scenes to amuse hikers on their way to the Champlain Lookout, one of the highest points along the Ottawa River and located at the rear of their property. In 1966 the park opened featuring a windmill, several story scenes and a playground. The park continued to expand, adding new scenes at a steady rate until 1973 when Durk Heyda suffered a heart attack and control was handed to family friend John Berkhout. Berkhout continued the parks growth throughout the 1980s, adding mini golf, paddle boats and many additional story scenes, some including moving mechanical scenes. In 2007 Berkhout announced his intention to retire and in the spring of 2008 he sold the park to Ottawa businessman Todd Mattila-Hartman and his company, Great North Parks. The contents of the park were put up for auction following the closure of the park in 2011. The Storyland Rabbit can be found in Carleton Place on Ontario Highway 7.

== Attractions ==
- Champlain Lookout: the highest point in the park with views along the Ottawa River Valley
- Off Road Rally: small battery powered vehicles
- Gone Fishin': a Hampton Dry Boat umbrella ride
- Fairytale Trail: a series of trails throughout the park containing many of the park’s storybook scenes
- Mini Golf: a standard 18 hole putt-putt style mini-golf course
- Splish-Splash Spray Park: a small water park including two inflatable water slides, a splash pad and a Water Wars game
- Crooked Pond Paddle Boats: paddle boats located on a small pond in the centre of the park
- Jump & Bounce: an inflatable bounce castle
- Playgrounds: there are a number of playgrounds located throughout the park
- Old MacDonald’s Farm: a petting zoo featuring many barnyard animals
- Storyland Arcade: a typical redemption game arcade
- Big Dragon and Little Dragon

== Shows ==
- Alice's Tea Party: characters from the park host daily tea parties (serving apple juice) and sing songs with the children
- Storytelling Time: An interactive show. Characters from the park perform a variety of skits and scenes from classic fairytales, getting details confused and encouraging the audience to call out the correct information.
- Special Performances: a variety of local performers are brought in throughout the summer to host magic shows, juggling acts and make balloon characters.

== Location ==
- Physical Address: 793 Storyland Road, Renfrew, Ontario K7V 3Z8

== Sources ==
- Cobden Then and Now, by George A. Wallace
