= Calderbank, Saskatchewan =

Community in Saskatchewan, Canada

Coordinates: 50°37′0″N 106°51′2″W

Calderbank is a hamlet in Saskatchewan, Canada, located in the Rural Municipality of Morse No. 165.

== History ==
Calderbank had a post office from 1914 to 1969. The community was named after Calderbank, North Lanarkshire, Scotland, the original home of Richard Whitelaw, the first postmaster.

== See also ==
- Scottish place names in Canada
- List of communities in Saskatchewan
- List of hamlets in Saskatchewan
