= Lochwinnoch, Ontario =

Coordinates: 45°28′45″N 76°33′07″W

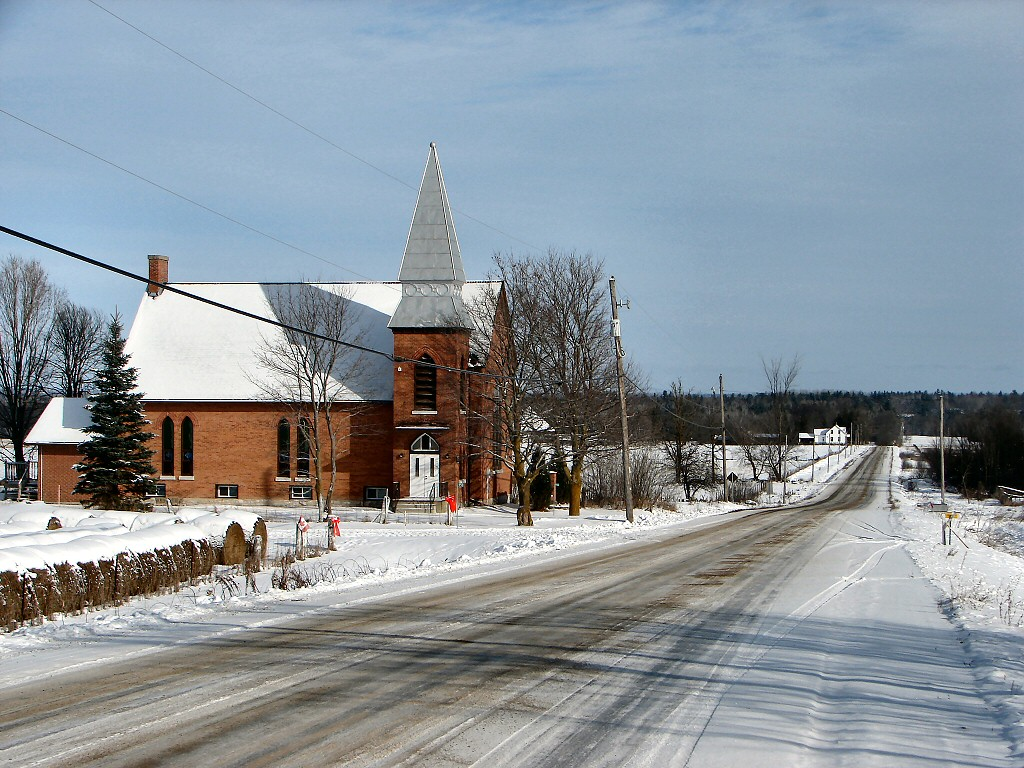
Lochwinnoch

Lochwinnoch is an unincorporated community located in Renfrew County, Ontario, Canada, that straddles Horton Township and McNab/Braeside Township.

Lochwinnoch Presbyterian Church located at 946 Lochwinnoch Road was opened on November 11, 1894.

One of two round barns is located in Lochwinnoch, one of which was built in 1884.
