= Portree, Nova Scotia =

Community in Nova Scotia, Canada

Coordinates: 46°24′1.66″N 60°57′59.64″W

Portree in Nova Scotia

Portree is a small community in the Canadian province of Nova Scotia, located in Inverness County on Cape Breton Island. It is named after Portree in Scotland, and was previously known as Kingsburg.
