= Horton, Ontario =

Horton
- Township (lower-tier)
- Township of Horton
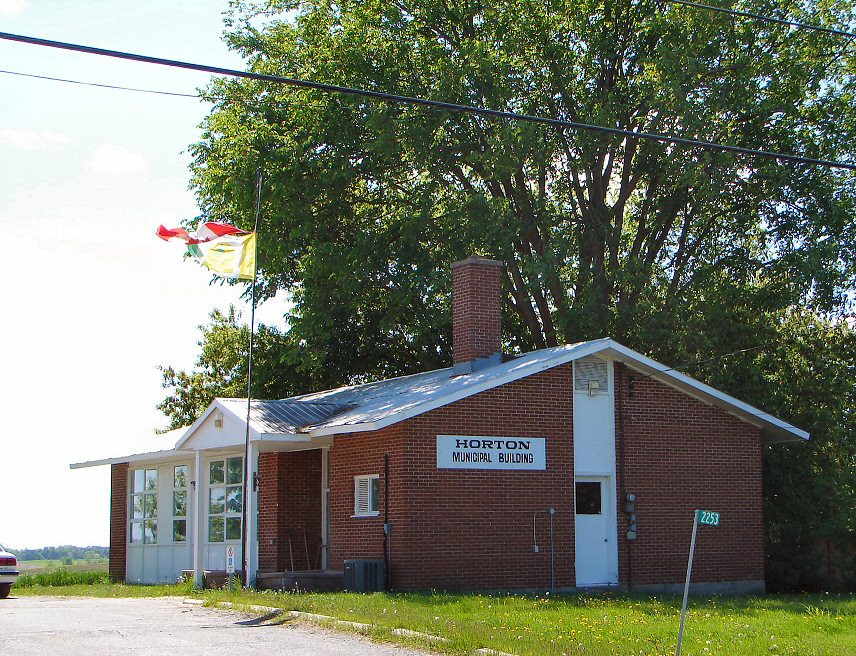
- Municipal building

- Location within Renfrew County Location within Southern Ontario
- Coordinates: 45°30′N 76°40′W
- Country: Canada
- Province: Ontario
- County: Renfrew
- Incorporated: 1850

Government
  - Mayor: Daina Proctor
  - Governing body: Horton Council
  - MP: Cheryl Gallant
  - MPP: Billy Denault

Area
  - Land: 158.02 km^{2} (61.01 sq mi)

Population (2021)
  - Total: 3,182
  - Density: 20.1/km^{2} (52/sq mi)
- Time zone: UTC-5 (EST)
  - Summer (DST): UTC-4 (EDT)
- Area codes: 613, 343
- Website: www.hortontownship.ca

Horton is a township in eastern Ontario, Canada, at the confluence of the Bonnechere River and the Ottawa River in Renfrew County. The Town of Renfrew was originally part of Horton Township.

== Communities ==
The township comprises the communities of Castleford, Castleford Station, Cotieville, Fergusons Beach, Goshen, Lochwinnoch (partially), Mayhew and Thompson Hill.

=== Castleford ===
In the 1820s, Lt. Christopher James Bell settled his land grant and named the area Castleford after his birthplace in West Yorkshire, England. A post office opened at Castleford in 1832, but the town was renamed Warnock in 1889 when the Castleford designation was given to the CPR station at Castleford Station. In 1891 the community name reverted to Castleford. The town of Castleford is the first of five chutes along the Bonnechere River. The others being Renfrew, Douglas, Fourth Chute and Eganville. The chutes were used to float timber past rapids and waterfalls.

=== Castleford Station ===
In 1889 the Castleford designation was also given to the CPR station at Castleford Station. Both communities were named after Castleford in West Yorkshire, England.

=== Goshen ===
Goshen is a former railway stop on a now abandoned line, probably named for the Land of Goshen, the Hebrew name of an area in the Nile delta in Ancient Egypt.

=== Lochwinnoch ===
The community of Lochwinnoch was named for the town of Lochwinnoch in Renfrewshire, Scotland.

== History ==
In 1826, the township opened for settlement, and by 1830, it had a population of 21. It was named after Robert Wilmot-Horton, a British member of Parliament who advocated immigration to Canada, and incorporated as a township municipality in 1850.

In 1858, the township lost part of its territory when the village of Renfrewville (renamed to Renfrew in 1895) was incorporated to form a separate village municipality.

== Demographics ==
In the 2021 Census of Population conducted by Statistics Canada, Horton had a population of 3,182 living in 1,290 of its 1,486 total private dwellings, a change of 10.2% from its 2016 population of 2,887. With a land area of 158.02 km^{2} (61.01 sq mi), it had a population density of 20.1/km^{2} (52.2/sq mi) in 2021.

Canada census – Horton community profile

	2021	2016	2011
Population	3,182 (+10.2% from 2016)	2887 (+6.2% from 2011)	2719 (-3.0% from 2006)
Land area	158.02 km^{2} (61.01 sq mi)	158.51 km^{2} (61.20 sq mi)	158.53 km^{2} (61.21 sq mi)
Population density	20.1/km^{2} (52/sq mi)	18.2/km^{2} (47/sq mi)	17.2/km^{2} (45/sq mi)
Median age	48.8 (M: 50.0, F: 48.4)	47.1 (M: 46.8, F: 47.5)	46.0 (M: 45.4, F: 46.5)
Private dwellings	1,486 (total) 1,290 (occupied)	1,385 (total) 1,173 (occupied)	1,234 (total) 1,080 (occupied)
Median household income	$90,000	$76,224	$68,433

References: 2021 2016 2011

Historical census populations – Horton, Ontario

Year	Pop.	±%
1921	1,259	—
1931	1,243	−1.3%
1941	1,148	−7.6%
1951	1,362	+18.6%
1956	1,427	+4.8%
1961	1,610	+12.8%

Year	Pop.	±%
1966	1,620	+0.6%
1971	1,706	+5.3%
1976	1,931	+13.2%
1981	2,017	+4.5%
1986	2,224	+10.3%
1991	2,426	+9.1%

Year	Pop.	±%
1996	2,515	+3.7%
2001	2,567	+2.1%
2006	2,803	+9.2%
2011	2,719	−3.0%
2016	2,887	+6.2%
2021	3,182	+10.2%

Population counts are not adjusted for boundary changes.
Source: Statistics Canada

Mother tongue (2021):

- English as first language: 94.3 %
- French as first language: 2.8 %
- English and French as first languages: 0.6 %
- Other as first language: 1.9 %

== Former attraction ==
- Storyland, closed 2011

== See also ==
- List of townships in Ontario
