= Cameron River volcanic belt =

Volcanic belt in the Northwest Territories, Canada

The Cameron River volcanic belt, also referred to as the Cameron River greenstone belt, is a late Neoarchean sequence of metamorphosed volcanic rocks (a greenstone belt) in the southern Slave Province northeast of Yellowknife in the Northwest Territories of Canada. It is part of the Yellowknife Supergroup, which includes the neighbouring Beaulieu River volcanic belt.

== See also ==
- List of volcanoes in Canada
- Volcanism of Canada
- Volcanism of Northern Canada
