= Butedale =

Village in British Columbia, Canada

Coordinates: 53°09′N 128°41′W

Butedale is a privately owned ghost town on Princess Royal Island, in British Columbia, Canada. The historic cannery village was founded in 1911. The village was founded by John Wallace, who sought to take advantage of fishing, mining and logging opportunities in the area.

Initially the salmon cannery was established by Western Packers, which was purchased and operated by the Canadian Fishing Company until it ceased operating in the 1970s. At its peak, Butedale's summertime population was over 400.

A post office was opened there in 1917, and closed on March 4, 1974.

The site also included a Canada Customs Office and was a Port of Entry to Canada. Southbound American fishing vessels could clear customs at Butedale.

== Background ==
There is a small dam that can generate power from Butedale Lake above the town, which is permitted to generate one megawatt of power. Butedale Falls flows out of the lake and falls into the ocean north of the townsite within the freehold lands at Butedale.

Butedale is a popular point of interest for cruise ship and ferry passengers sailing the Inside Passage of British Columbia. Permission is required from Inside Passage Marine to visit the site. Butedale is accessible by boat, floatplane or helicopter.

== Gallery ==
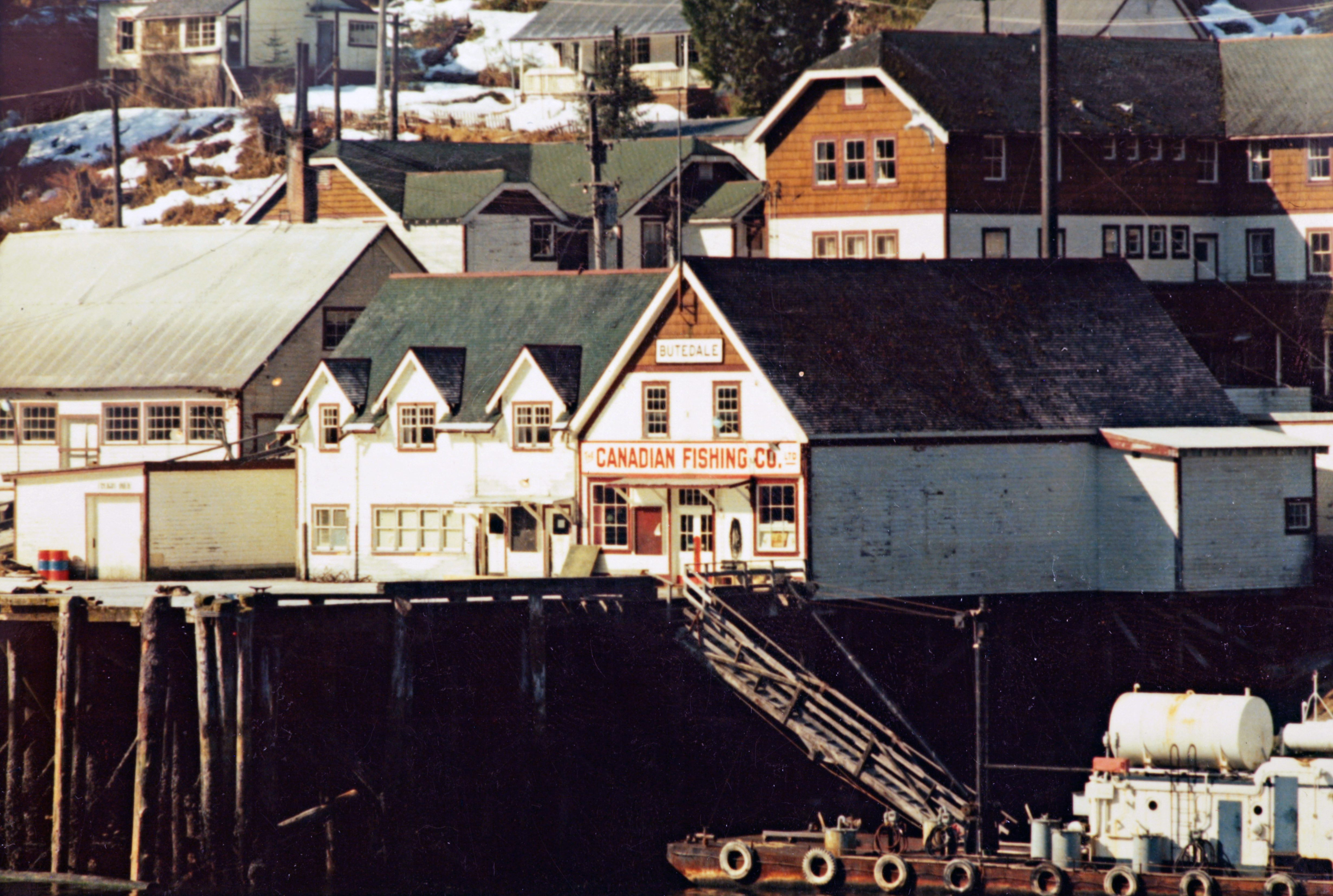
Butedale, BC, April 1975

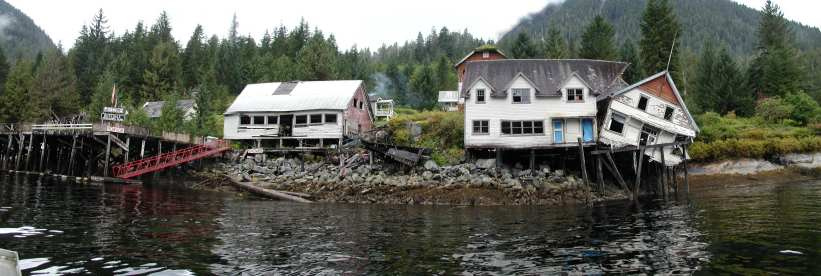
Butedale as seen from Fraser Reach

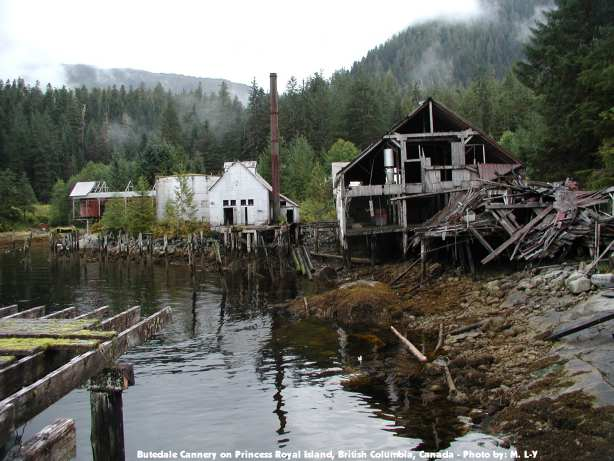
Butedale

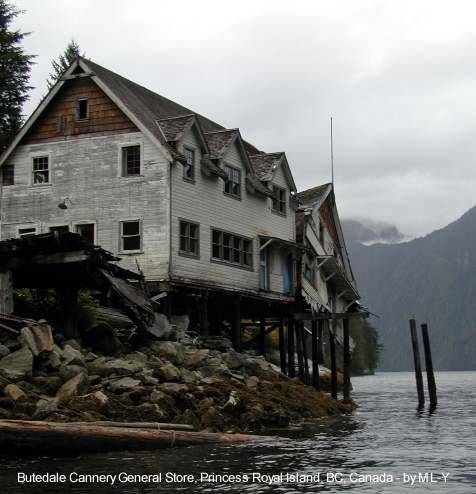
Butedale General Store

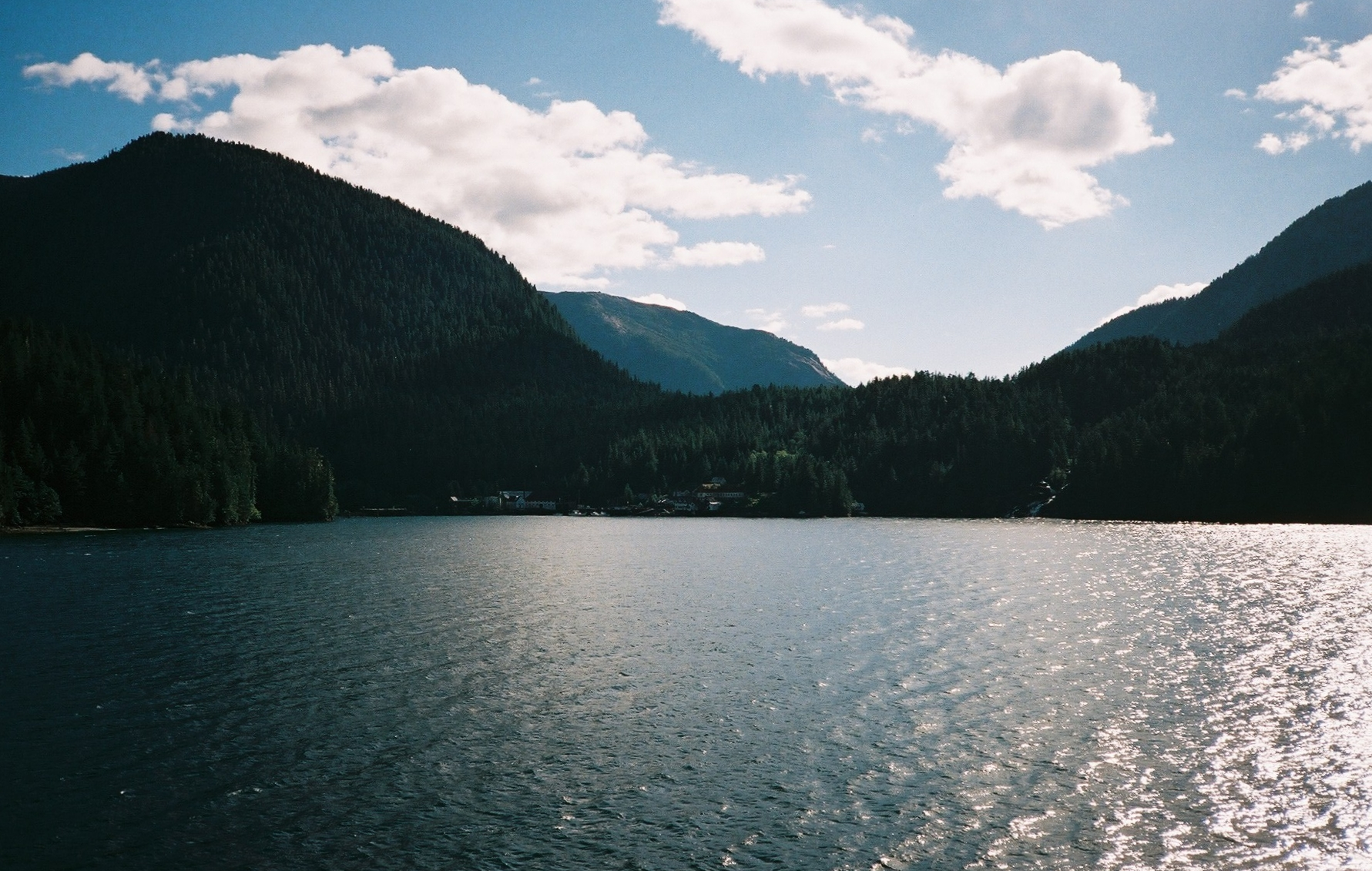
Butedale seen from the middle of the channel

== See also ==
- Surf Inlet, British Columbia
