= Butedale Falls =

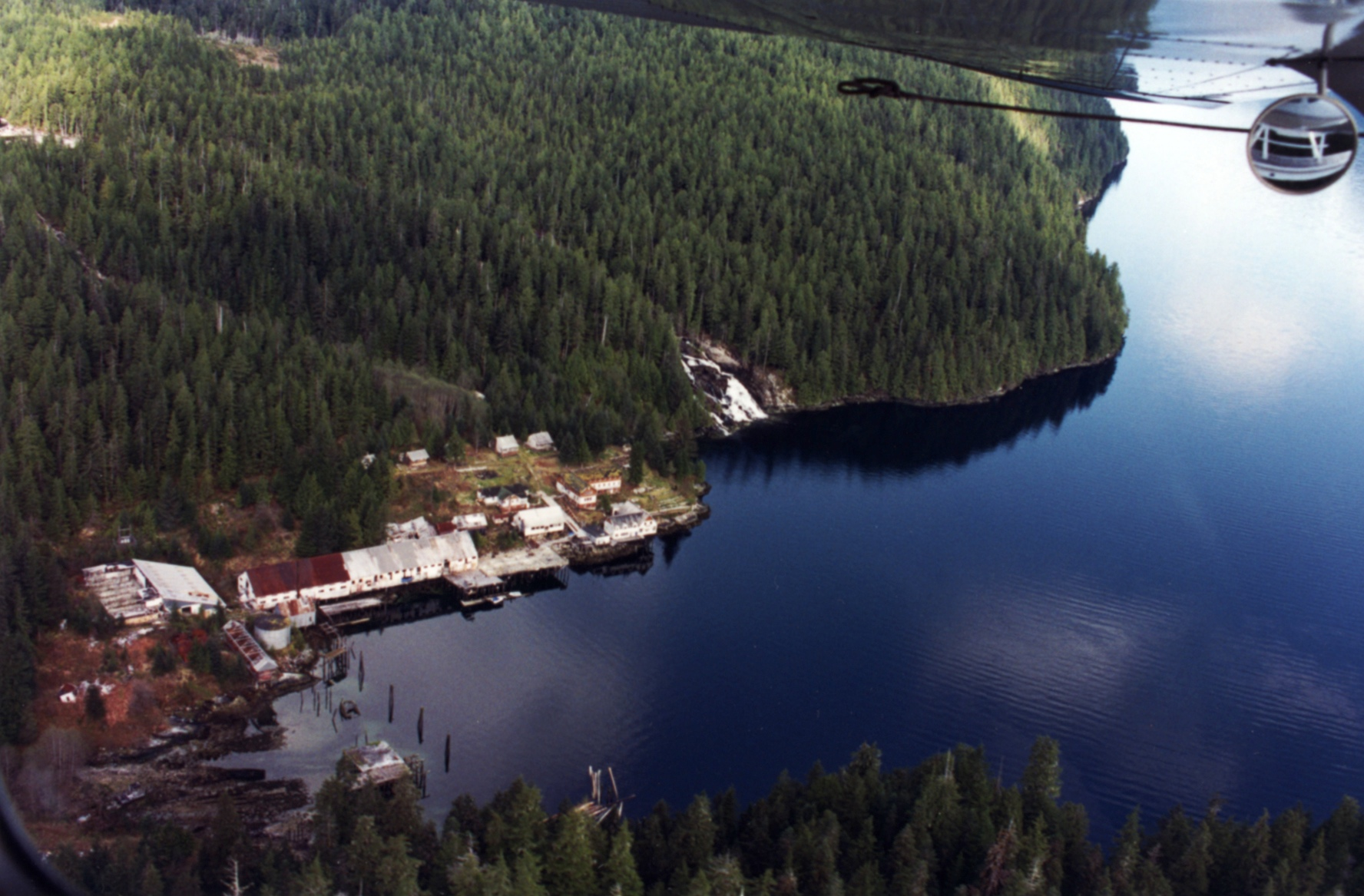
- Butedale Falls with Butedale to the left
- Interactive map of Butedale Falls
- Location: Butedale, British Columbia
- Coordinates: 53°09′42″N 128°41′50″W
- Type: Cascade
- Total height: 315 feet (96 m)
- Number of drops: 1
- Average width: 315 feet (96 m)
- Watercourse: Butedale Creek

Butedale Falls is a high-volume waterfall located just north of the old ghost town of Butedale, British Columbia. The entire section of stream between the outlet of Butedale Lake & the Inside Passage is one long series of cascades collectively known as Butedale Falls. Butedale Lake is 315 feet above sea level and the falls base is the ocean so the falls' height is 315 feet.

== See also ==
- List of waterfalls
- List of waterfalls in British Columbia
