= MacLarens Landing =

Community in Canada

Coordinates: 45.511°N 76.165°W

Location of MacLarens Landing in Ontario

MacLarens Landing is a community in West Carleton-March Ward in Ottawa, Ontario.

It is named for James Maclaren, who opened a mill in nearby Buckingham, Quebec.
