= Malcolm, Ontario =

Ghost town in Bruce County, Ontario

Coordinates: 44.234°N 81.102°W

Location of Malcolm in Ontario

Malcolm is a ghost town in Bruce County, Ontario, located within the municipality of Brockton.
