= Houston Stewart Island =

Uninhabited island in the Canadian Arctic

- Location within Nunavut Location within Canada

Geography
- Location: Northern Canada
- Coordinates: 75°43′N 095°28′W
- Archipelago: Queen Elizabeth Islands; Arctic Archipelago

Administration
- Canada
- Territory: Nunavut

Demographics
- Population: Uninhabited

Houston Stewart Island is one of the Canadian arctic islands in Nunavut, Canada. Located in the Queens Channel, it is surrounded by larger islands: Devon Island to the north; Dundas Island and Margaret Island to the northeast; Baillie-Hamilton Island to the east; Cornwallis Island to the south; Little Cornwallis Island to the southwest; Crozier Island to the west; and Baring Island to the northwest.
