= Beinn Scalpie, Nova Scotia =

Locality in Nova Scotia, Canada

Coordinates: 46°11′51.56″N 60°33′34.41″W

Beinn Scalpie in Nova Scotia

Beinn Scalpie is a locality in the Canadian province of Nova Scotia, located in Victoria County on Cape Breton Island.
