= Dalmuir, Alberta =

Place name in Canada

Coordinates: 53.997°N 112.951°W

Dalmuir is a rural locality in Alberta, Canada that is northeast of Edmonton.

The community takes its name from Dalmuir, in Scotland.
