= Lochalsh, Huron County, Ontario =

Human settlement in Huron County, Ontario, Canada

Coordinates: 44.015°N 81.650°W

Location of Lochalsh in Ontario

Lochalsh is a community in Huron County, Ontario.
