= Speyside, Ontario =

Speyside
- Unincorporated community
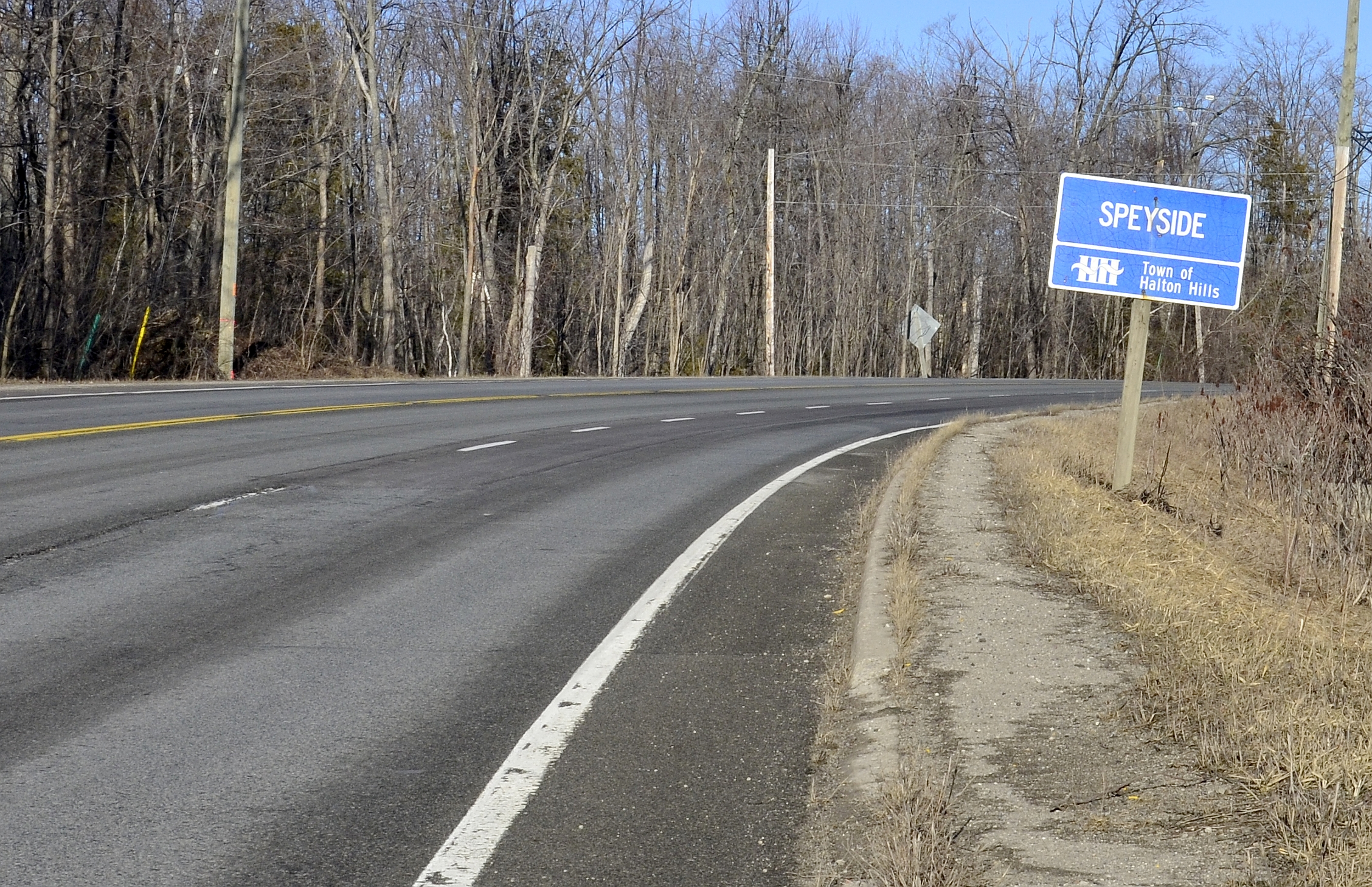
- Entering Speyside from the south along Highway 25

- Location of Speyside Speyside (Southern Ontario)
- Coordinates: 43°34′41″N 79°58′34″W
- Country: Canada
- Province: Ontario
- Regional municipality: Halton
- Town: Halton Hills
- Time zone: UTC-5 (Eastern (EST))
  - Summer (DST): UTC-4 (EDT)
- GNBC Code: FCRCB

Speyside is an unincorporated community in Halton Hills, Ontario, Canada.

Once a thriving pioneer community, little remains of the original settlement.

The Bruce Trail and Speyside Resource Management Area are located near the settlement.

== History ==
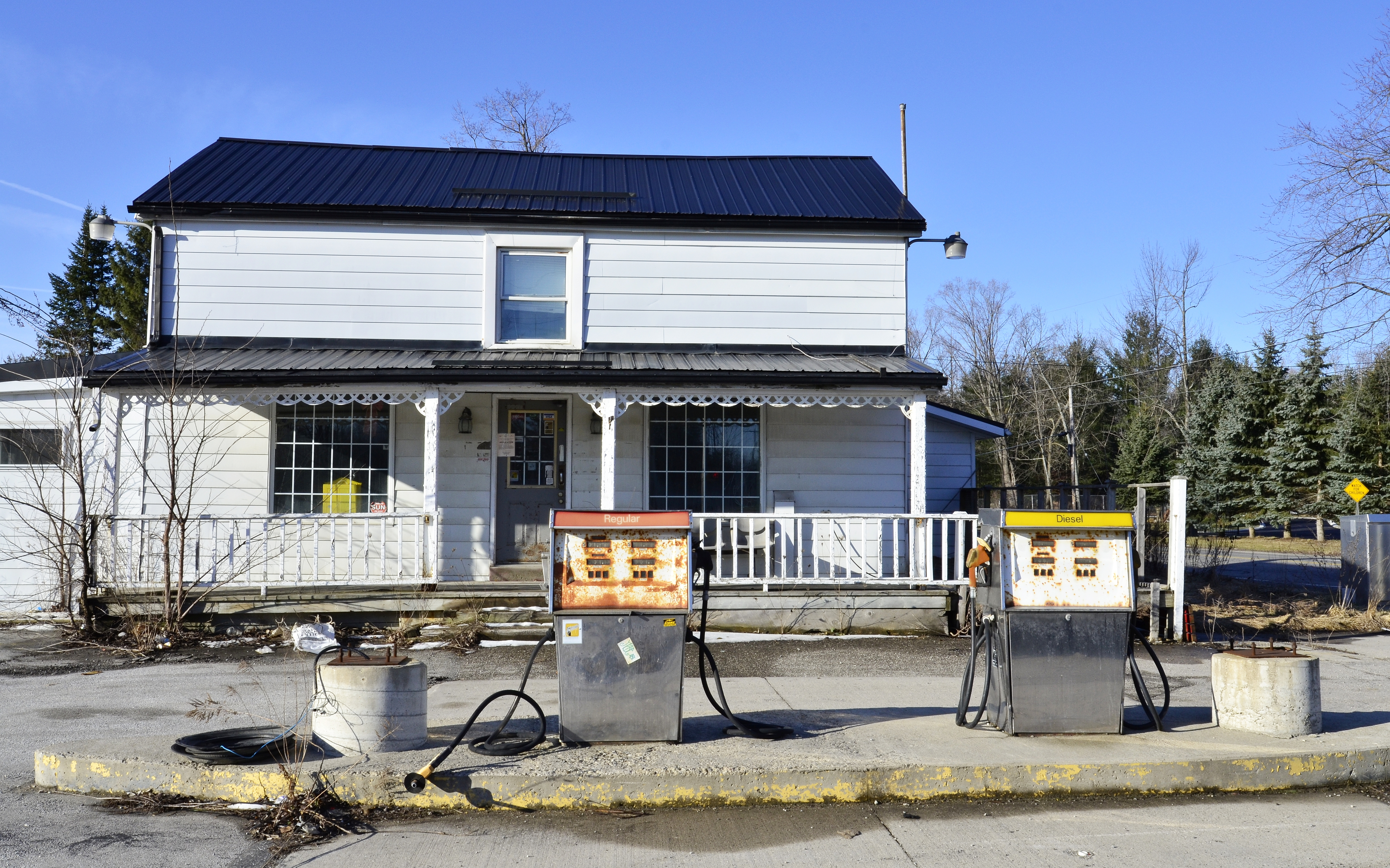
Abandoned business in Speyside

Early settlers believed a local creek resembled the River Spey in Scotland, and named the new settlement "Speyside".

Between the 1850s and 1870s, Speyside had a hotel (the Stewart Hotel), two general stores, a village hall (used as a school), a tannery, a blacksmith, two saw mills, and a stone quarry. The settlement planned for seven streets that were never constructed. The population in 1874 was 200. Speyside had a post office from 1873 to 1914.

By 1908, the population had declined to 40.

An oak tree in Speyside is recognized for its historic importance. The tree was grown from an acorn of an English oak growing in Royal Park in Windsor, England. The acorns were sent across the Commonwealth to commemorate the coronation of King George VI and Queen Elizabeth. The acorn was planted at a nearby school in 1937, and then transplanted to the school in Speyside when it opened in 1960. The school closed in 1986.
