= Bella Bella =

Bella Bella may refer to:

== Places ==
- Bella Bella, British Columbia, on Campbell Island, also known as Waglisla
  - Bella Bella Airport (Campbell Island), airport north west of Bella Bella
- Old Bella Bella, the name for the Heiltsuk village that grew up around the Hudson's Bay Company's historic Fort McLoughlin
- the former Bella Bella Airbase on Denny Island, in operation from 1941 to 1944, was renamed Shearwater, British Columbia in 1952 and remains the site of the Bella Bella post office
  - Bella Bella Airport, the former name of Denny Island Aerodrome, an airport east of Bella Bella at Shearwater

== Indigenous people ==
- Heiltsuk people, formerly known as the Bella Bella, an indigenous people of the Pacific Northwest Coast
  - Heiltsuk language, their language

== Other ==
- Orchestre Bella Bella, a DR Congo musical group
- Bella Bella (album), 1976 Sten & Stanley album
- "Bella Bella" (song), 2019 song by Luca Hänni

== See also ==
- Bella Coola (disambiguation)
- Bella (disambiguation)
- Bela-Bela, a town in South Africa formerly known as Warmbaths
