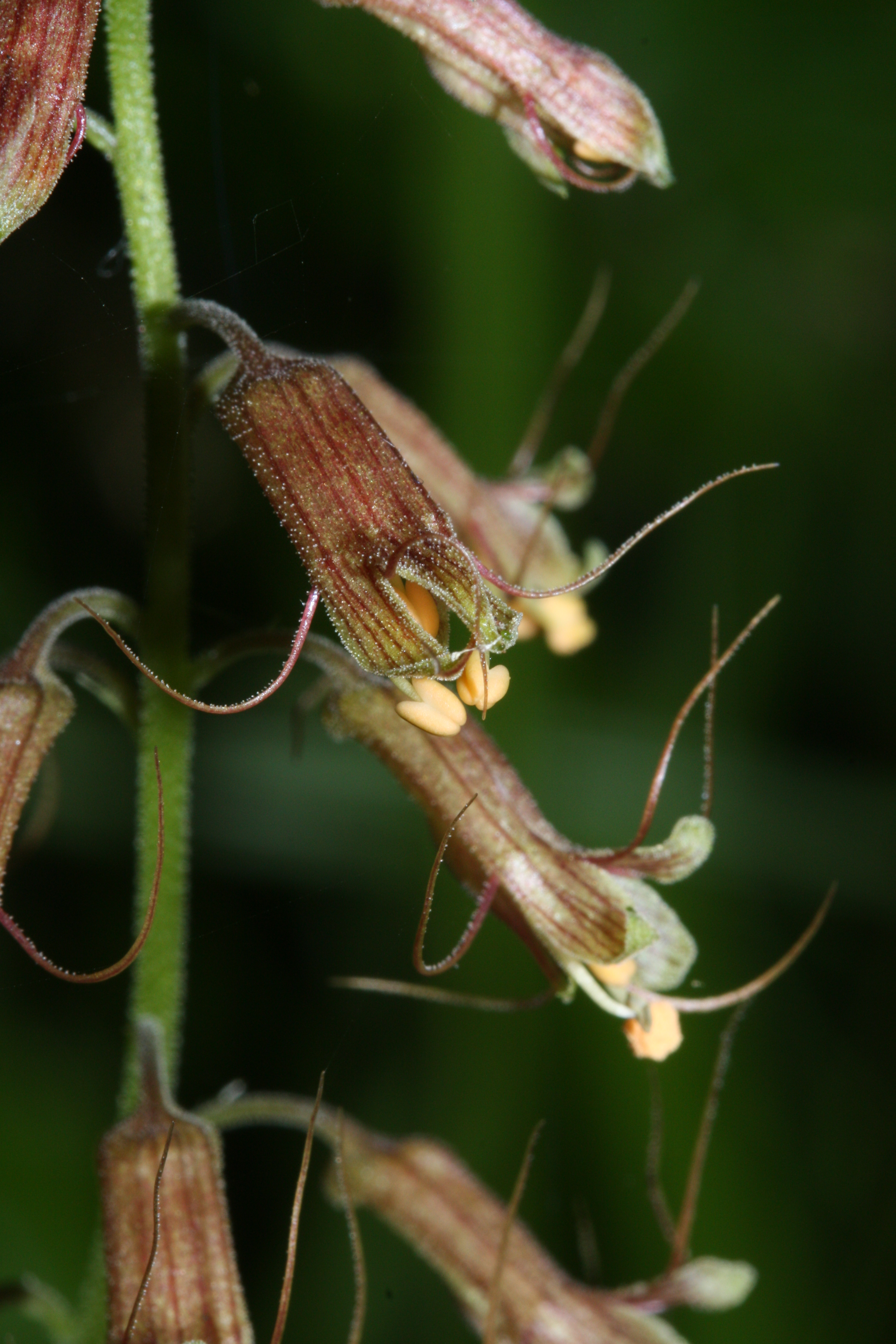
- Tolmiea menziesii

Scientific classification
- Kingdom: Plantae
- Clade: Tracheophytes
- Clade: Angiosperms
- Clade: Eudicots
- Order: Saxifragales
- Family: Saxifragaceae
- Genus: Tolmiea; Torr. & A.Gray (1840), nom. cons.

Species
- Tolmiea diplomenziesii Judd, Soltis & P.S.Soltis; Tolmiea menziesii (Pursh) Torr. & A.Gray

Synonyms
- Leptaxis Raf. (1837)

= Tolmiea =

Genus of flowering plants

Tolmiea is a genus of flowering plants in the saxifrage family containing two species native to northwestern North America. The genus was formerly considered to be monotypic until diploid populations were split off as T. diplomenziesii from the tetraploid populations of T. menziesii.

The genus was named after the Scottish-Canadian botanist William Fraser Tolmie.

== Species ==
Two species are accepted.

- Tolmiea diplomenziesii Judd, Soltis & P.S.Soltis – California and Oregon
- Tolmiea menziesii (Pursh) Torr. & A.Gray – Alaska, British Columbia, Oregon, and Washington
