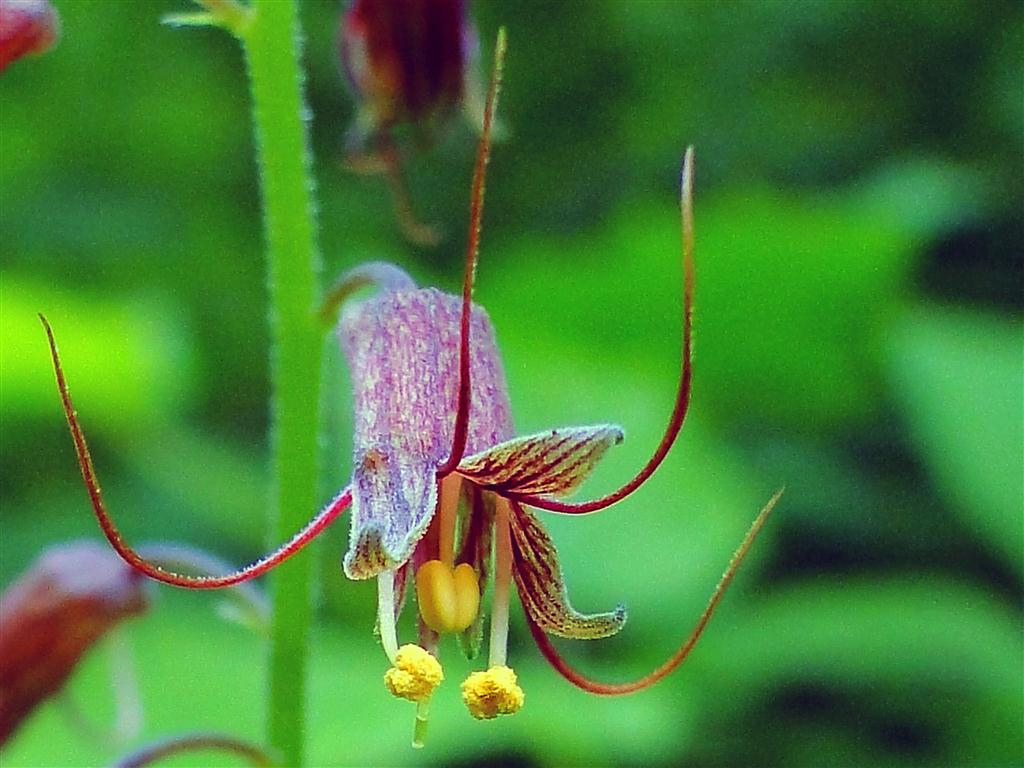

Scientific classification
- Kingdom: Plantae
- Clade: Tracheophytes
- Clade: Angiosperms
- Clade: Eudicots
- Order: Saxifragales
- Family: Saxifragaceae
- Genus: Tolmiea
- Species: T. menziesii

Binomial name
- Tolmiea menziesii (Pursh) Torr. & Gray

= Tolmiea menziesii =

Species of flowering plant

Tolmiea menziesii (/tɒlˈmiːə mɛnˈziːzi.aɪ/) is a species of flowering plant in the family Saxifragaceae. It is known by the common names youth on age, pick-a-back-plant, piggyback plant, and thousand mothers. It is a perennial plant native to the West Coast of North America, occurring in northern California, Oregon, Washington, British Columbia and southern Alaska. It occurs as a naturalised plant or garden escapee in Scotland, parts of Wales, Northern Ireland and northern and western parts of England.

== Description ==
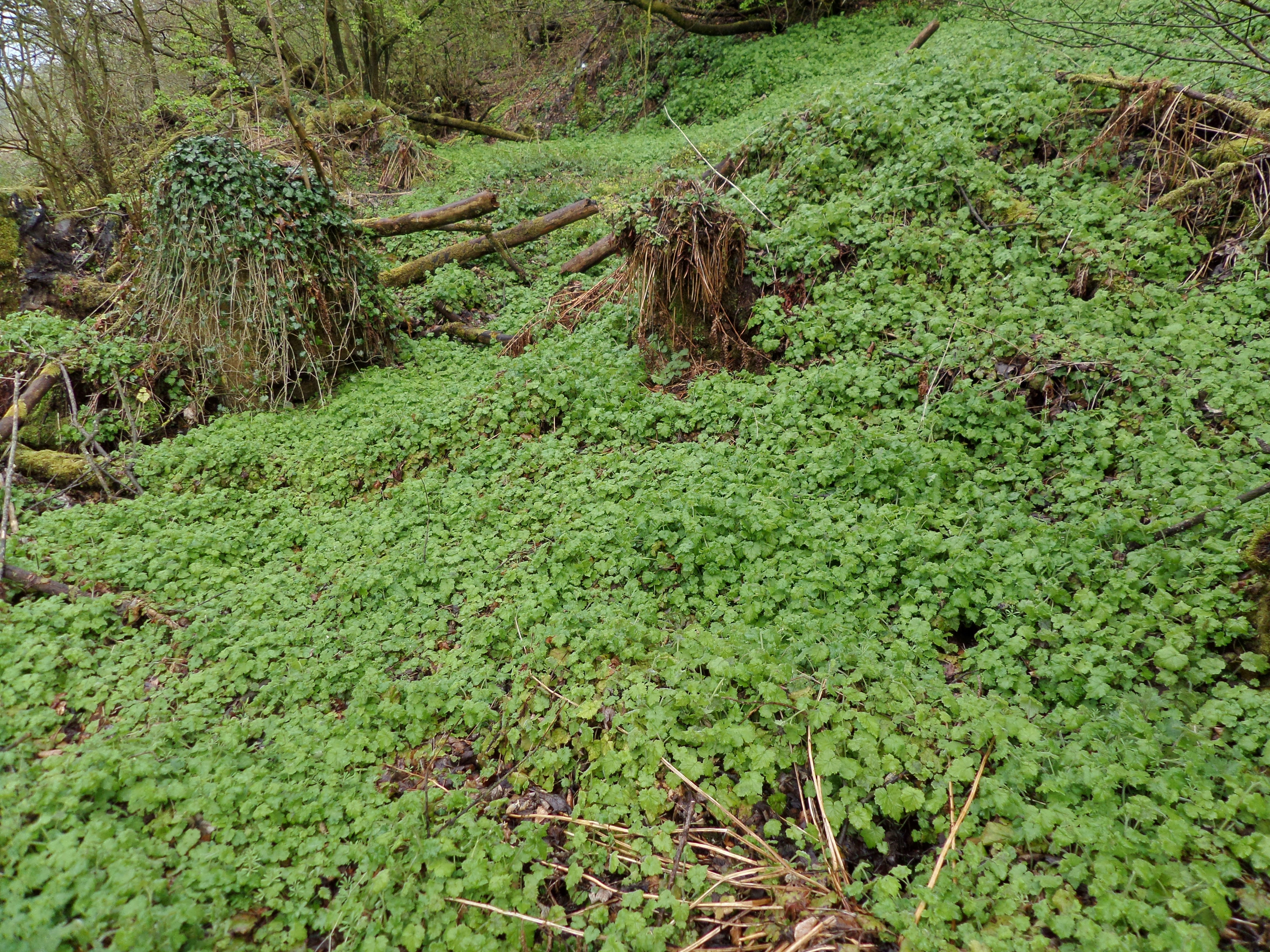
Piggyback dominating a habitat in Stewarton, Scotland.

Tolmiea menziesii has hairy, five to seven-lobed, toothed leaves and a capsule fruit containing spiny seeds.

It bears many small flowers in a loose raceme. Each flower consists of a tubular purple-green to brown-green calyx and four linear or subulate (awl-shaped) red-brown petals, about twice the length of the sepals.

It has unusual reproductive habits. It grows plantlets from the petiole near the base of each leaf. The plantlets drop off, fall in the soil, and take root there. It will also reproduce by rhizomes and by seeds.

Crushing the leaves of this plant releases a strong cucumber-like odour. (2E,6Z)-2,6-nonadienal was identified as the source of this odor. In nature, banana slugs, Ariolimax columbianus, are selective in their diet and were not observed to feed on this plant. In a feeding experiment, the slugs rejected lettuce leaves that had been treated with (2E,6Z)-2,6-nonadienal.

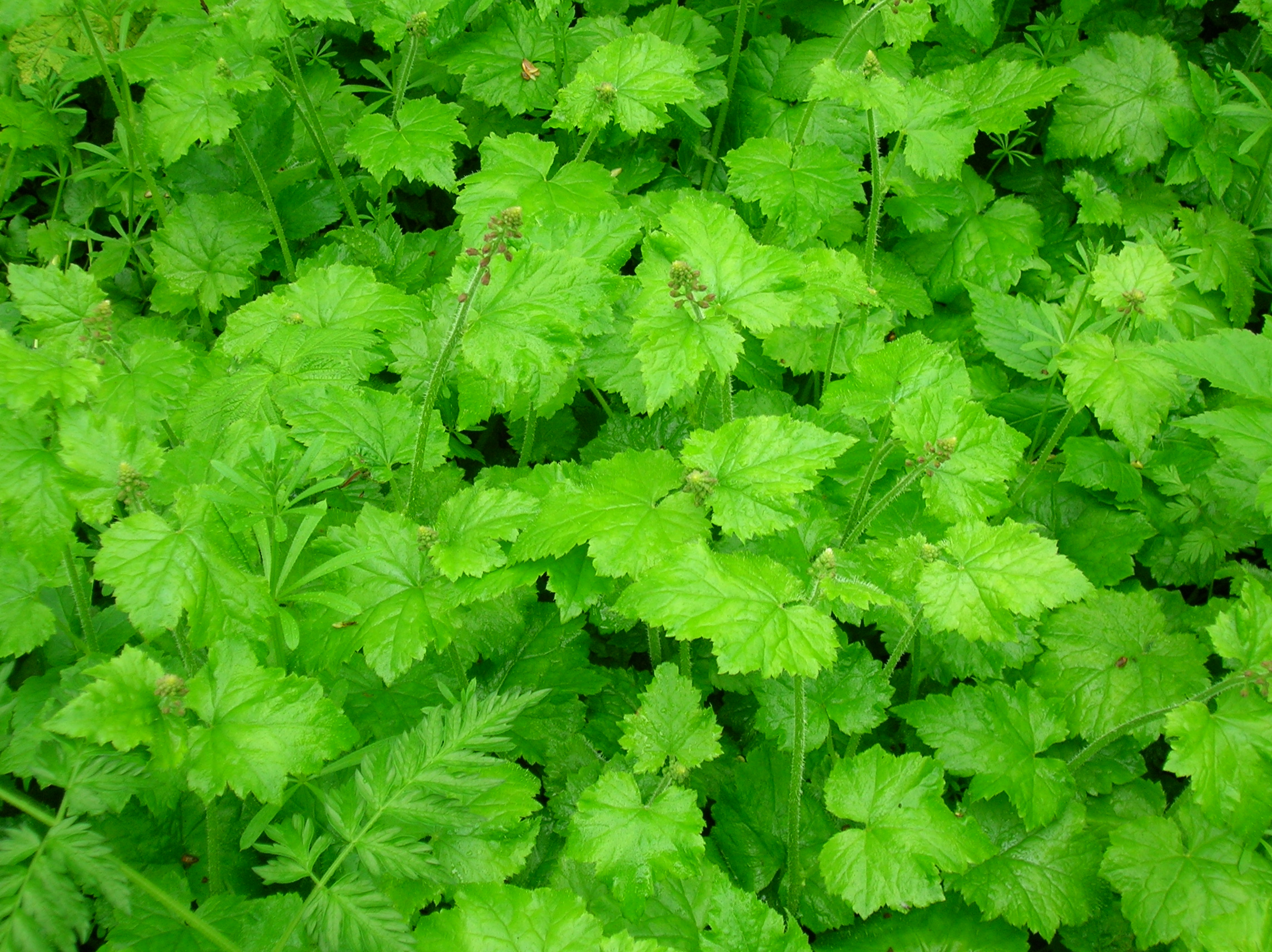
Tolmiea menziesii foliage.

== Taxonomy ==
The genus was named after the Scottish-Canadian botanist William Fraser Tolmie, while the species name refers to Archibald Menzies, the Scottish naturalist for the Vancouver Expedition (1791–1795).

The plant was formerly considered to be the only member of a monotypic genus until diploid populations (due to autopolyploidy) were split off as a separate species T. diplomenziesii from the tetraploid populations.

== Cultivation ==
Tolmiea menziesii is commonly cultivated as an ornamental plant, for use as a house plant or planted as a groundcover in gardens. It requires moisture and does not tolerate much sun or dryness.
