= Campbell Island (British Columbia) =

Island in British Columbia, Canada

Coordinates: 52°7′N 128°12′W

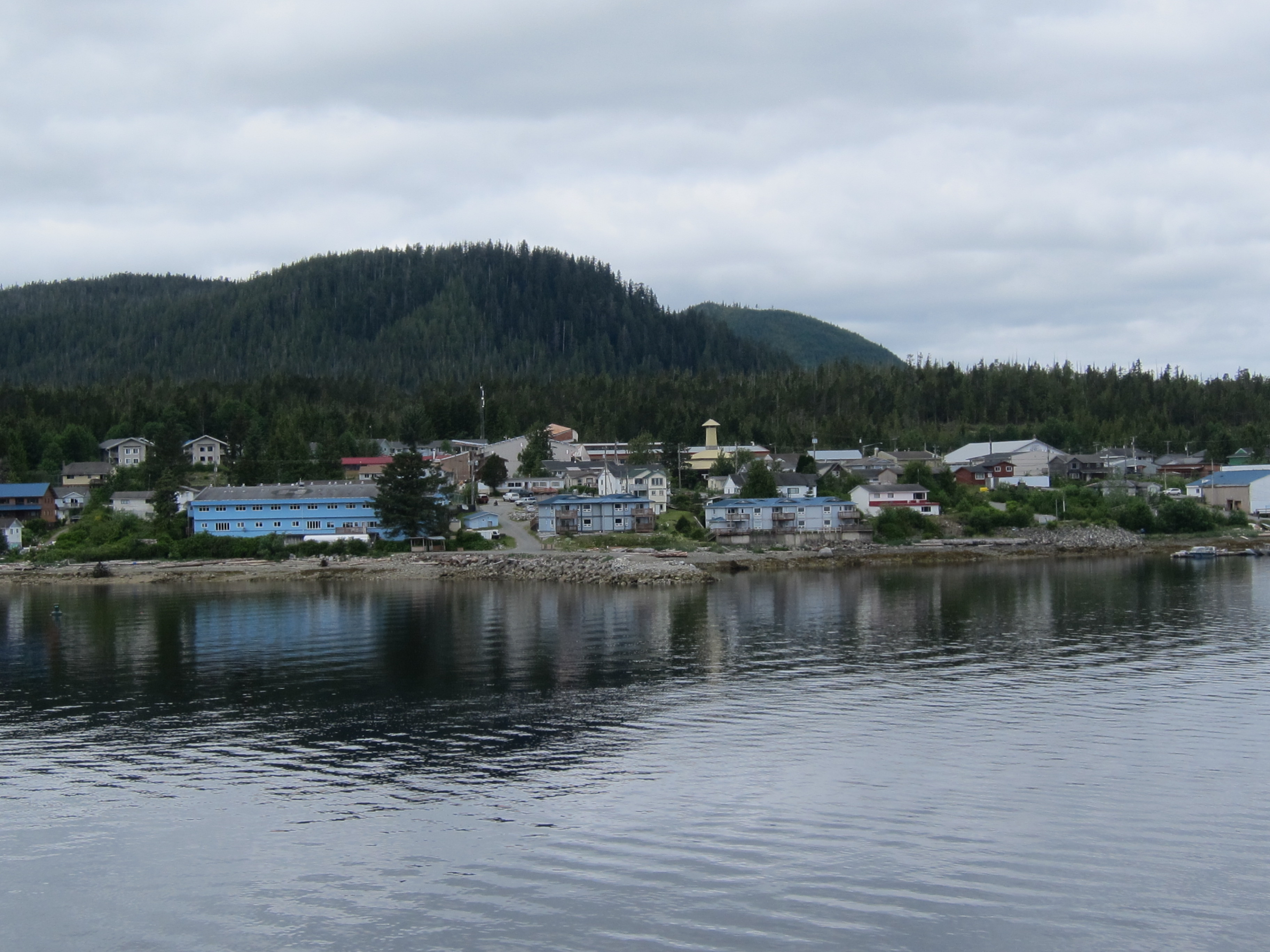
Downtown area of Bella Bella in Campbell Island, British Columbia

Campbell Island is an island in the Canadian province of British Columbia, located west of Denny Island and north of Hunter Island, near Milbanke Sound. The Inside Passage waterways of Lama Passage and Seaforth Channel meet at its northern end.

The communities of Bella Bella and Campbell Island, just north of Bella Bella, are located there. The same location is believed to have been that of Fort McLoughlin, an early Hudson's Bay Company post in the days of the Maritime Fur Trade, with the name McLoughlin Bay since conferred on the bay and a lake and a creek just south of where the settlement of Bella Bella is today. (Old Bella Bella was on nearby Denny Island.)

Campbell Island was probably named by Captain Pender during his 1866–69 surveys of the area, likely for a Dr. Campbell for whom also Campbell Point, on Loughborough Inlet, and Campbell River may also have been named. Dr. Samuel Campbell was ship's surgeon aboard HMS Plumper from 1857 to 1861. The Heiltsuk have traditionally governed Campbell Island and depend on fishing as their primary industry.
