= Denny Island (Canada) =

Island on the Central Coast of British Columbia, Canada

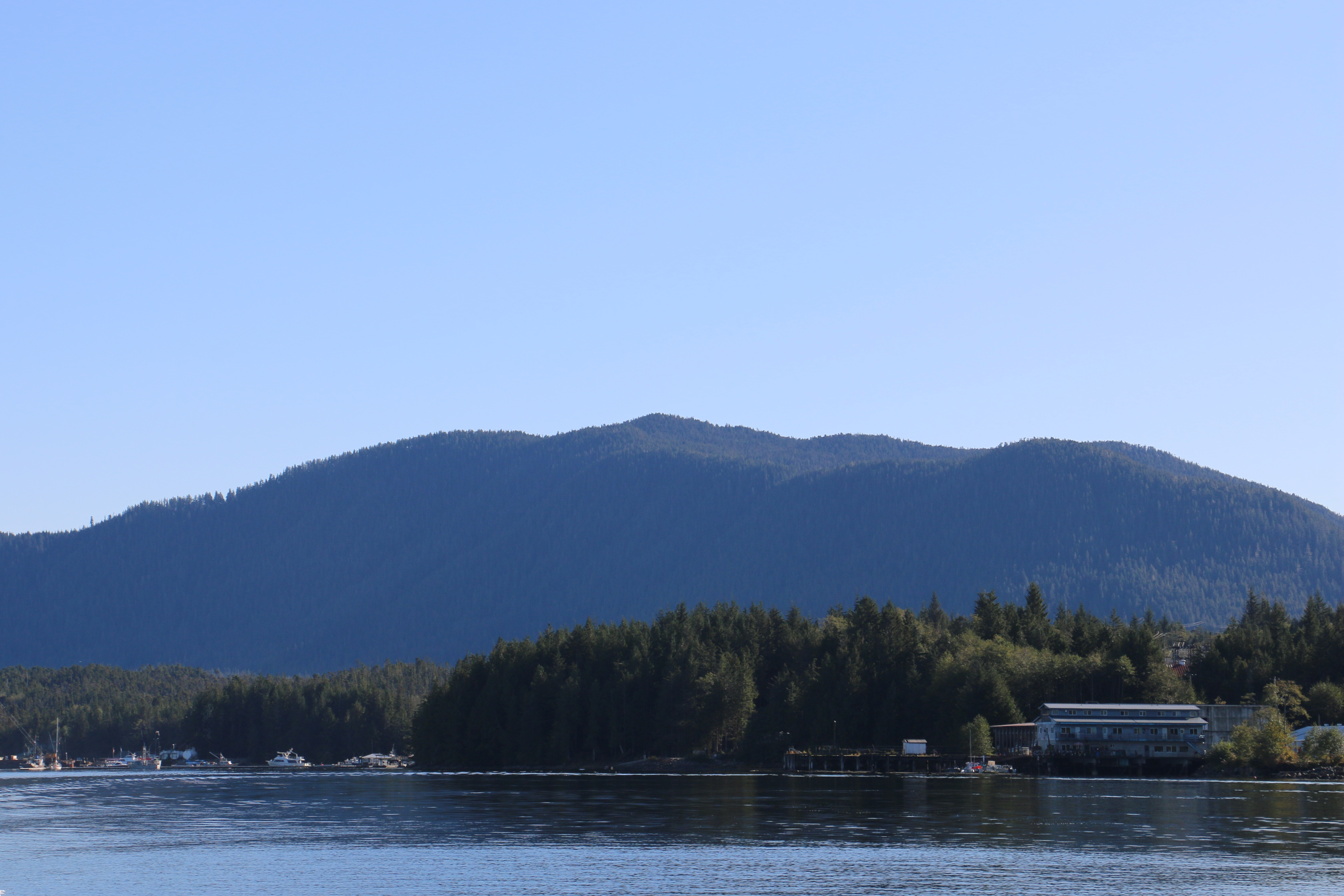
Shearwater, on Denny Island, British Coulmbia, Canada

Denny Island is an island on the Central Coast of British Columbia, in the Central Coast Regional District, Canada. It lies just east of the community of Bella Bella, aka Waglisla, which is on Campbell Island. It is the location of Old Bella Bella, now mainly abandoned, but home to Canadian Coast Guard and Fisheries & Oceans bases, and Shearwater, home to Shearwater Marine. The island has a population of 138. Its main attraction is the McEmery Aquatic Centre on Reservoir Lane.

== Name origin ==
Also Denny Rock, Queen Charlotte Sound. Named c1866 by Captain Pender, after Lieutenant D'Arcy Anthony Denny, commander on this station 1866-68, HM gunboat Forward, being succeeded in June of the latter year by Lieutenant T.H. Larcom. (Victoria Colonist, 16 June 1868). Entered the service, 1850; lieutenant, 1858; commanding paddle gunboat Coromandel, China, 1864; commander, 1868; served on SE coast of South America in command of gun vessel Dart, 1872-76; appointed to the Coast Guard service on his return to England, 1876, where he remained until his death in 1883.

— John T. Walbran, British Columbia Coast Names, 1592-1906: their origin and history

== Denny Island Aerodrome ==
Denny Island Aerodrome
- IATA: none; ICAO: CYJQ

Summary
- Airport type: Public
- Operator: Denny Island Airport Commission c/o Central Coast Regional District
- Location: Denny Island, British Columbia
- Time zone: PST (UTC−08:00)
  - Summer (DST): PDT (UTC−07:00)
- Elevation AMSL: 162 ft (49 m)
- Coordinates: 52°08′23″N 128°03′49″W

Map
- Location in British Columbia

Runways
| Direction | Length | | Surface |
| Direction | ft | m | Surface |
|---|---|---|---|
| 10/28 | 2,954 | 900 | Asphalt |
- Source: Canada Flight Supplement

Denny Island Aerodrome (ICAO: CYJQ) is a registered aerodrome and lies 2 nautical miles (3.7 km; 2.3 mi) east of Bella Bella. The 2,954 ft × 100 ft (900 m × 30 m) runway is not maintained during the winter and, being unlit, is usable only during the day.

== See also ==
- Bella Bella and Gale Passage dike swarms
- Denny Island (Monmouthshire, Wales)
- Great Bear Rainforest
- List of islands of Canada
