= Bella Coola =

Bella Coola could refer to the following:

- Bella Coola, British Columbia, a community of approximately 2,100 people in the Bella Coola Valley
- Bella Coola River
- Bella Coola Valley, the region and group of communities along that river
- Nuxalk, an ethnic group
- Nuxalk Nation, an indigenous people of the area who in the past had been referred to as the Bella Coola
- Nuxalk language spoken by Nuxalk peoples, also known as the Bella Coola language

== See also ==
- Bella Bella (disambiguation)
