= Fort Simpson (Columbia Department) =

Coordinates: 54°33′N 130°26′W

Fort Simpson was a fur trading post established in 1831 by the Hudson's Bay Company (HBC) near the mouth of the Nass River in present-day British Columbia, Canada. In 1834, it was moved to the Tsimpsean Peninsula, about halfway between the Nass River and the Skeena River, and was later referred to as Port Simpson or as the native name Lax Kw'alaams. The fort was part of the HBC's Columbia Department.

== Economic fur trade ==
One of the primary reasons for the establishment of Fort Simpson, as well as Fort McLoughlin to the south, was to undermine the American dominance of the Maritime Fur Trade. By 1830, the higher prices paid for furs by American coastal traders had resulted in an indigenous fur trading system that diverted furs from the interior New Caledonia district of the HBC to the coast. Fort Simpson and Fort McLoughlin were built to intercept these furs before they could reach American traders, who had no permanent posts on the coast. The strategy was ultimately successful. By 1837, American competition was essentially over.

In 1829 George Simpson, HBC administrator, informed the Russian-American Company, that the HBC was planning to build a fort at the river's mouth, on the frontier between the two companies' territories. In July 1830 Aemilius Simpson visited the area, confirmed that furs from New Caledonia were being brought to the coast, and made plans for the fort's construction. Fever among Simpson's crew prevented construction from beginning right away. A second voyage, under Aemilius Simpson, Peter Skene Ogden, and John Work, left Fort Vancouver in March 1831, and began construction in April 1831.

Aemilius Simpson and Peter Skene Ogden spent the summer of 1831, trading at the new post and the Queen Charlotte Islands. Simpson died in September 1831, and the new post was named in his honor. Ogden was placed in charge of the post as Chief Trader. The first clerks at Fort Simpson were Donald Mason and John Kennedy. At the foundation of the fort there were 23 Hawaiian Kanakas, though by 1837, none of these original employees remained at Fort Simpson after being reassigned to other HBC trading posts like Fort McLoughlin. While small in number, Hawaiians continued to work at Fort Simpson until the 1850s.

== Prime location ==
In 1834, Fort Simpson was moved from the mouth of the Nass River to a more favourable location on the nearby Tsimpsean Peninsula. The village that grew around the fort later became known as Port Simpson. In 1986, the name was officially changed to Lax Kw'alaams. Port Simpson is also the name of the body of water upon which Lax Kw'alaams and the site of Fort Simpson are located.

Fort Simpson rapidly became a profitable success, becoming the central trading point of a large region. In 1841, for example, Fort Simpson was visited by about 14,000 people, mostly indigenous. The Tsimshian people came to dominate the trade and collected furs from any other coastal people including the Tongass, Haida, and Kaigani, as well as the Dakelh (Carrier) people in the interior. The fort was soon surrounded by a village of the Tsimshian "homeguard" of at least 800 people. The homeguard controlled most of the indigenous trade and was the fort's main source of provisions, security, and labour. By the end of the 1830s Fort Simpson's fur trade profits exceeded those of any other HBC post along the Pacific coast. Unable to provide its own food, provisions were at first brought from Fort Vancouver and other posts, but in time native trade supplied most of the fort's needs.

During the 1862 Pacific Northwest smallpox epidemic thousands of indigenous people were evicted from large semi-permanent camps near Victoria and forced to return to their homelands, spreading smallpox throughout the Pacific Northwest coast. Groups of Tsimshian thus brought smallpox from Victoria to the Fort Simpson area, whence it spread widely starting in June of 1862. While authorities at other Hudson's Bay Company forts, as well as at nearby Metlakatla, administered smallpox vaccine and tried to limit the epidemic, no preventative measures were taken at Fort Simpson. Smallpox deaths at the fort began in late May and peaked in late June. Through the summer Nisga'a, Haida, Tlingit, and other indigenous people arrived regularly at the fort to trade, contributing to the spread of smallpox throughout the Northern Coast, up the Skeena River and the Nass River into the British Columbia interior.

By early July the native settlement outside the fort was deserted due to deaths and people fleeing the area. All Tsimshian peoples suffered high death rates from smallpox in 1862–63: About 67% among the Southern Tsimshian (Kitkatla, Kitkiata, and Kitasoo), 37% among the Nisga'a, 22% among the Gitxsan, and about 23% for the Coast Tsimshian.

== Hudson Bay anchor ==
By 1844, Fort Simpson was the most profitable of any fur district in the HBC's Columbia Department, excepting New Caledonia. Furs collected along the coast by the steamship Beaver also generated large fur returns. The 1844 returns of Fort Simpson and the Beaver exceeded that of New Caledonia. The success of the Beaver after 1843 resulted from the closure of two HBC posts on the coast north of Fort Langley, Durham (Taku), and Fort McLoughlin, on Milbanke Sound. Only Fort Simpson was kept as the company's anchor on the northwest coast.

== Images ==
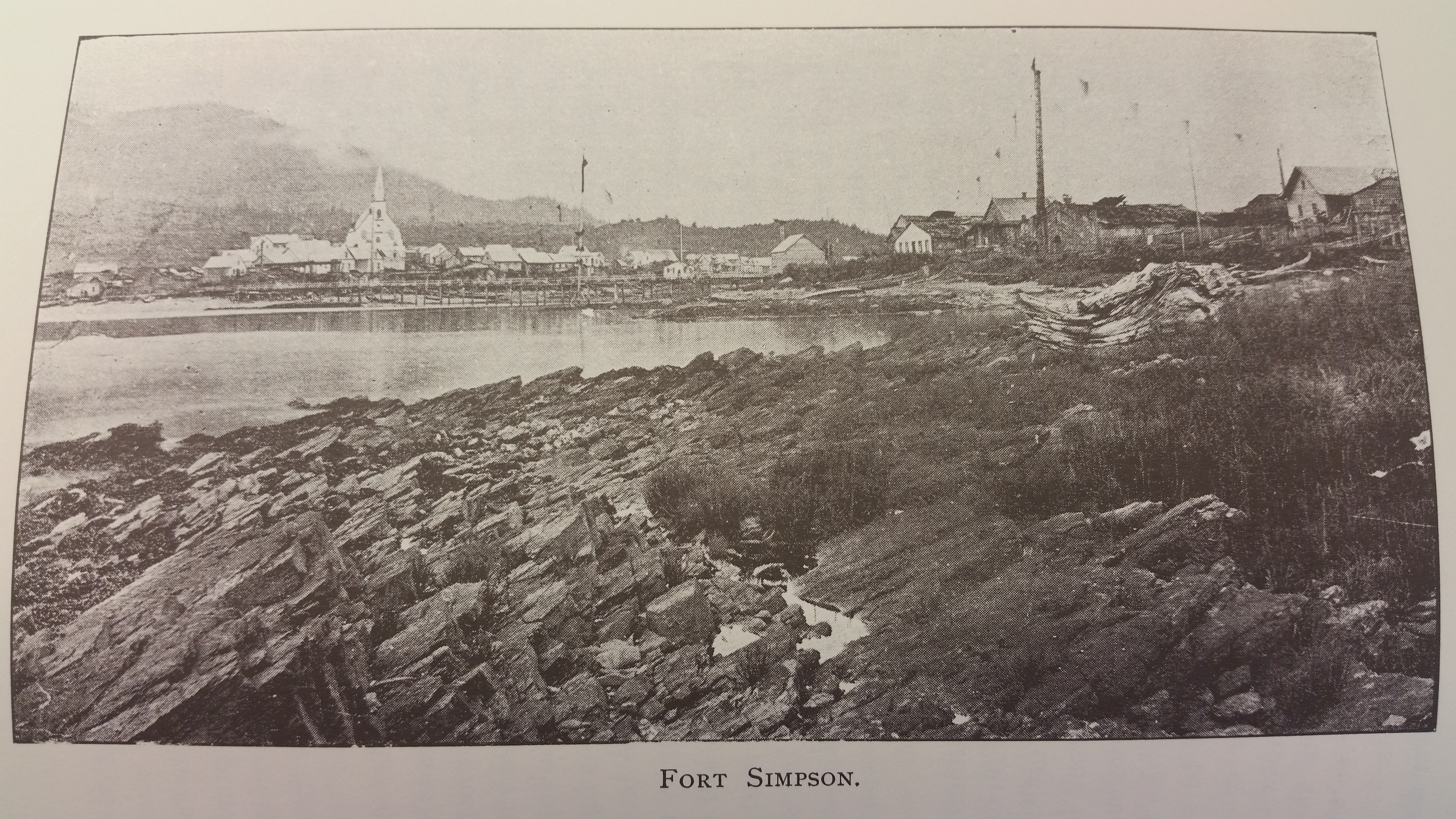
Fort Simpson

== See also ==
- Fort Simpson, Northwest Territories
- Kaigani (trading site)
