= Tolmiea diplomenziesii =

Scientific classification
- Kingdom: Plantae
- Clade: Tracheophytes
- Clade: Angiosperms
- Clade: Eudicots
- Order: Saxifragales
- Family: Saxifragaceae
- Genus: Tolmiea
- Species: T. diplomenziesii

Binomial name
- Tolmiea diplomenziesii Judd, Soltis & P. S. Soltis

Species of flowering plant

Tolmiea diplomenziesii is a species of flowering plant of the genus Tolmiea. It is found mainly in Oregon and California, but it is endemic to the United States. The plant was formerly considered to be part of T. menziesii but was split off as a separate species because while T. menziesii is tetraploid, T. diplomenziesii is diploid.
