= Shearwater, British Columbia =

Canadian Fishing Resort Community

Coordinates: 52°08′50″N 128°05′34″W

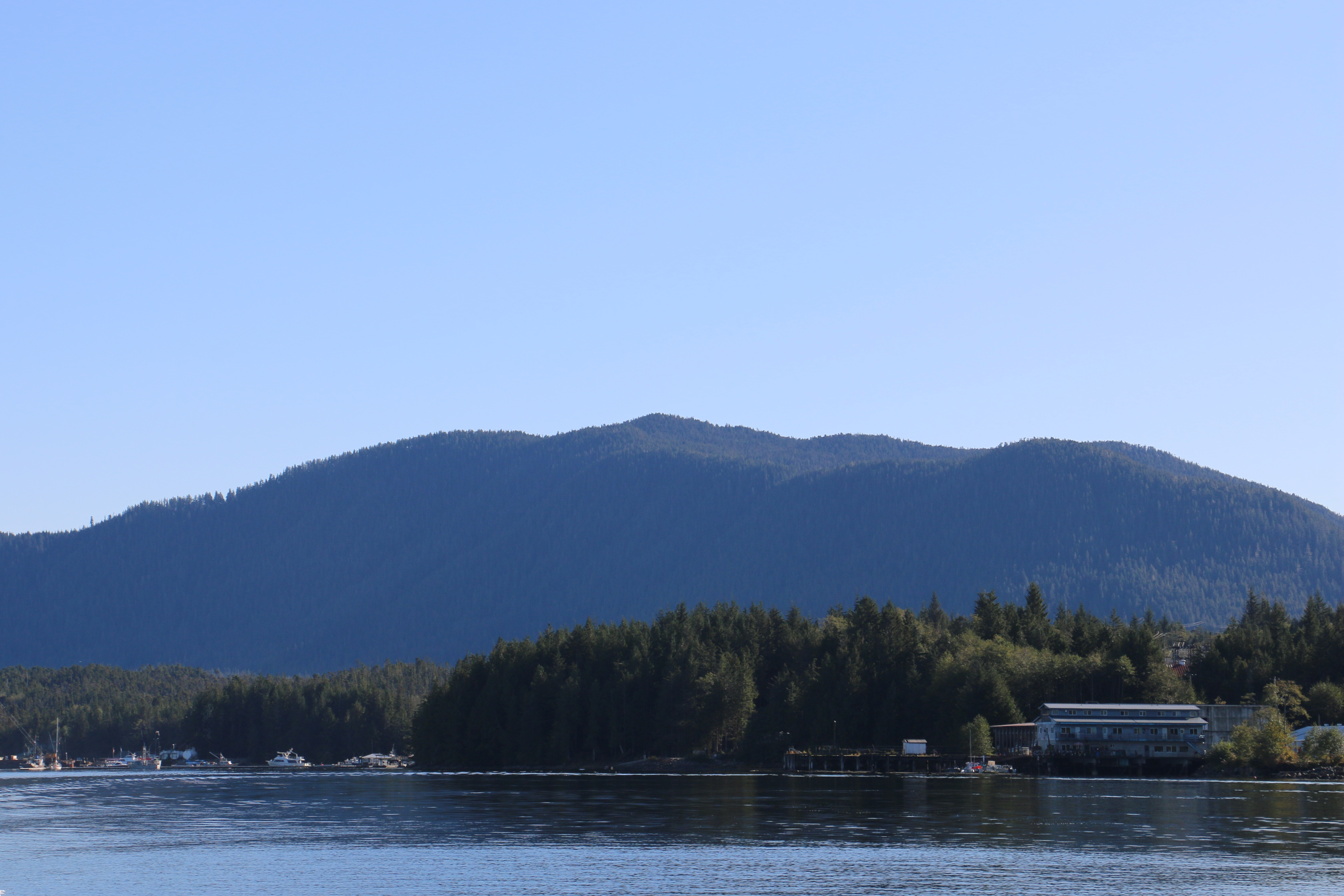
Entrance to Shearwater harbour

Shearwater is a community in coastal British Columbia. It is located three miles from Old Bella Bella on Denny Island. It is in the territory of the Heiltsuk Nation.

== History ==
Shearwater was originally built as an antisubmarine bomber reconnaissance post in 1941 and then abandoned in 1944. It was then purchased and developed into a fishing resort with a full service marina, fishing resort, restaurant and hotel. The hangar and the bomb shelter are all that survive from the original base.

The resort was recently sold to (2022), and is now owned and operated by, The Heiltsuk Nation.

Today, Shearwater Resort LLP is British Columbia's ultimate wilderness and eco-tour destination, offering a selection of wildlife tours as well as accommodations and mooring services. Shearwater is located on BC's Central Coast in the Great Bear Rainforest. The resort offers many amenities including moorage, a year-round hotel, a fully stocked grocery and liquor store, a post office, a bar and grill, a laundromat, a full service boatyard and a marine store. During the summer months, kayaking, paddle boarding, eco tours and other tourist activities are planned.

There are local community members that offer sport fishing tours as well.

It was named after HMS Shearwater, a Royal Navy vessel on the British Columbia coast from 1902 to 1915 when she was transferred to the Royal Canadian Navy.

== Community ==
There is a Canada Post branch for the community of Denny Island (V0T-1B0) located inside the grocery and liquor store. There is also a laundromat, gift shops, clothing store and gardening store just up the road. There is a small community school with students from grades K–7. There are approximately 100 full-time (and growing) residents. There is also a small RV park (with full hook ups) and tenting grounds available for a small fee.

Accommodations in the town include the Shearwater Resort, La La Land, the Denny Island B&B, and the Whiskey Cove B&B.

== Transportation ==
The Shearwater Resort operates an hourly or bi-hourly ferry service to Bella Bella. If taking the BC Ferries "Discovery Coast Passage" route, you can take the Ferries South to Port Hardy or North/East to a number of communities including: Bella Bella, Bella Coola, Klemtu, and Ocean Falls. There are a limited number of roads on Denny Island, though there is a barge service provided by BC Ferries that can bring your vehicle over to the island.

Pacific Coastal Airlines operates flights twice daily in the summer and daily in the winter to Bella Bella from Vancouver International Airport South, also Air North has Seasonal Charters from Vancouver International Airport South to Bella Bella. From there, boat service is available to Shearwater itself.

== See also ==
- List of World War II-era fortifications on the British Columbia Coast
