= Old Bella Bella =

Coordinates: 52°09′43″N 128°08′42″W

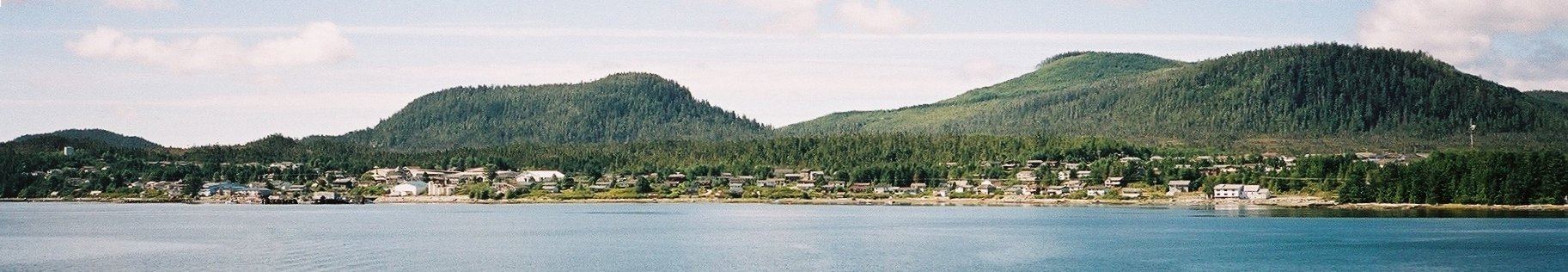
Bella Bella

Old Bella Bella, also known as Old Towns or Qlts, was the name for the Heiltsuk village that grew up around the Hudson's Bay Company's historic Fort McLoughlin, at McLoughlin Bay on Campbell Island. The village relocated to the present site of Bella Bella, British Columbia by 1903. Today the Heiltsuk control the site, which houses a BC Ferries terminal, fish plant, and two houses, as well as archaeological remains of the old village.

Located on Campbell Island opposite the modern town now carrying the name Shearwater, the village grew and the Hudson's Bay Company closed the fort and replaced their operations with steam-ships. William Fraser Tolmie a Scottish doctor and fur trader employed by the Hudson's Bay Company left a record of some of his time at the fort and observed the development of the Heiltsuk village there.

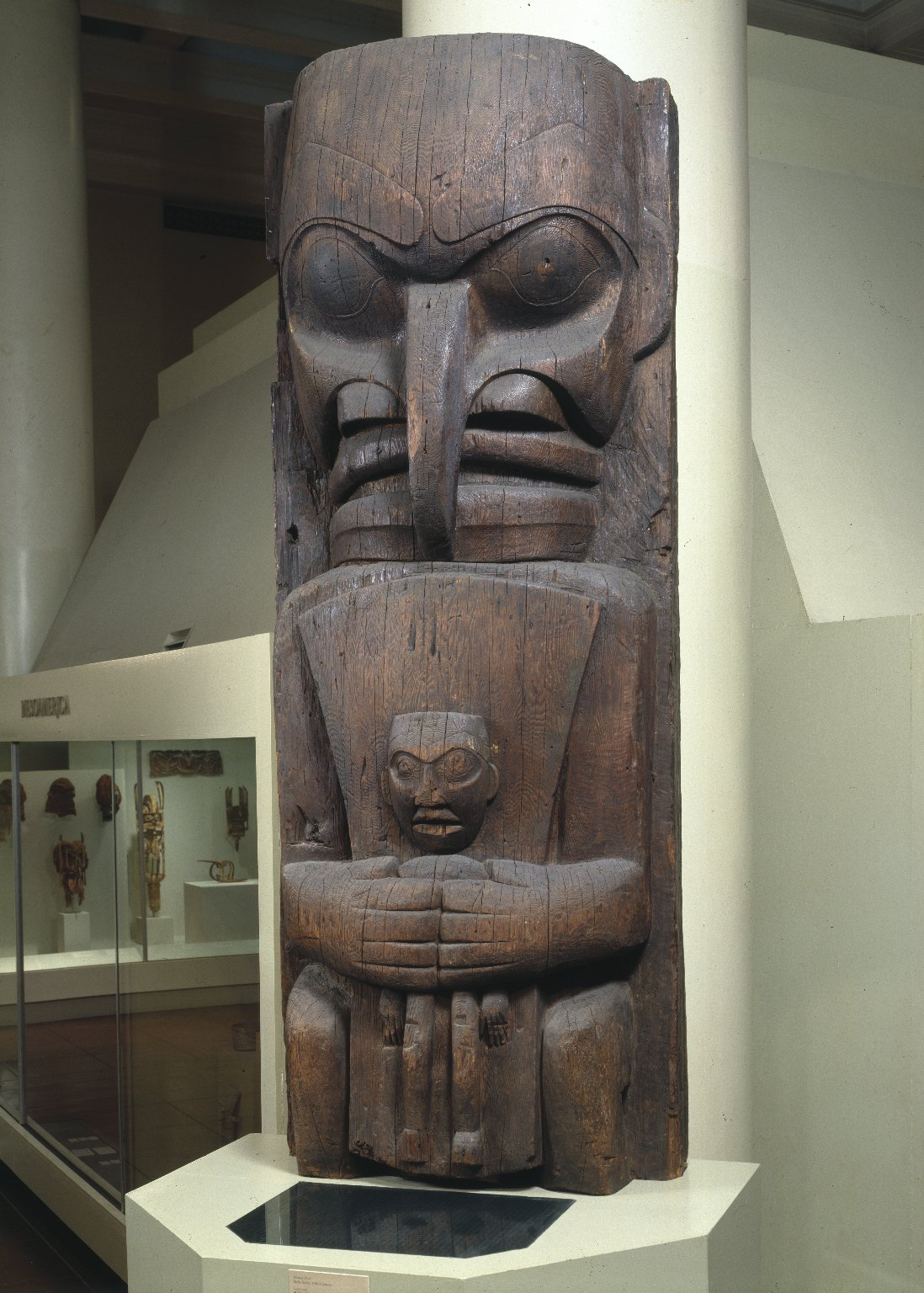
Heiltsuk (Bella Bella) (Native American). House Post, from a Set of Four, 19th century. Cedar wood, Brooklyn Museum

== Early history ==
The Heiltsuk village of Old Bella Bella (then simply Bella Bella) grew up adjacent to Fort McLoughlin, the Hudson's Bay Company trading fort at McLoughlin Bay. The fur trade employee, and later politician William Fraser Tolmie worked at Fort McLoughlin and wrote about his experiences in his book Physician and Fur Trader, providing interesting insights to the history.

The Fort closed in 1843. One report says that the Heiltsuk burned the abandoned fort for the iron;

The Indians who had gathered around the fort, left to their own devices, immediately burned it down to obtain the iron used in its construction, and nothing now remains of this early trading post.

— R. Geddes Large, Drums and Scalpel: From Native Healers to Physicians on the North Pacific Coast

A few years after the fort was abandoned, the Hudson's Bay Company had a change of mind and opened a store on the site of the former fort. They operated the store until deciding to lease it out, which they did in May 1883.

The community grew from the original group that had first built next to the fort.

The Heiltsuk population was ravaged by the 1862 Pacific Northwest smallpox epidemic.

During the late 1800s other Heiltsuk leaders brought their people together at Old Bella Bella;

Chief Humpshet and his followers from the north end of Hunter's Island; Chief Kiete and his people from the village on Spiller Channel.

— R. Geddes Large, Drums and Scalpel: From Native Healers to Physicians on the North Pacific Coast

== 1880-1900 ==
The village changed significantly during the latter part of the 1800s, with European influence driving some of the change. A missionary account of the village in 1898 describes it;

The Indians were still located in McLoughlin Bay, but were housed in European type houses, closely crowded together. There was a home for the missionary and a school and church. Approximately three hundred Indians inhabited the village where the people were supposedly Christianized and their children attended day school.

— R. Geddes Large, Drums and Scalpel: From Native Healers to Physicians on the North Pacific Coast

Several traditional bighouses also existed in the village. A set of house posts was collected from one of these houses and is now located in the Brooklyn Museum.

By the late 1880s the Heiltsuk traditional lifestyle was changing rapidly. Decimated by disease, the tribes gradually congregated on Campbell Island, a central location within the territory, and the site of a Hudson's Bay Company fort. By that time the Heiltsuk had been long involved in trading with the outer coast and so the fort held the attraction of a central commerce area as well as a source of medical aid in the treatment of new diseases. Thus the community of Bella Bella was formed, although today the village is located approximately 2 kilometres north of its original location.

— Heiltsuk Nation, Occupation, Use and Management of the "Sakai-Spiller Hotspot"

Some time in the 1880s Humchitt, the head Heiltsuk Chief, moved into Bella Bella from his village about 11km away. On Christmas day, 1882, Humchitt gave a feast to which he invited all the people of Bella Bella and the surrounding villages. At this feast hostilities that had existed between Humchitt and Chief Charley were resolved, clearing the way for the amalgamation of the Heiltsuk villages.

— Martha Black, Bella Bella: A Season of Heiltsuk Art

By 1897 the Heiltsuk had decided to relocate the community.

Dr. J.A. Jackson, the first medical missionary at Bella Bella, arrived in 1897. He initiated the relocation of the community to Waglisla because the site on McLoughlin Bay had become overcrowded and there was not enough land to build the single-family homes that the missionaries thought were essential to Christian life. The people's decision to move may have been precipitated by the destruction of Chief Nunukvas' home, which had been built on pilings at the water's edge, in a severe storm. After this unfortunate event the Heiltsuk asked the resident trader to allow them to build on the large vacant section of land that the Hudson's Bay Company held in the centre of the village. When he refused they decided to move to the new location.

— Martha Black, Bella Bella: A Season of Heiltsuk Art

The community continued to grow and a store was built in the community. - which also included a post office which used the name "Bella Bella" from 1930 to 1991 until changed to Old Bella Bella when the newer settlement across the strait was renamed Bella Bella after being Waglisla from 1974 to 1993.

When the store at McLoughlin Bay closed, the postal service, along with the name "Bella Bella" was transferred, first to a cannery, then to Shearwater, British Columbia.

The name "Old Bella Bella" is sometimes applied to both the original village at McLoughlin Bay, to the old post office in the "BC Packers Cannery" (now closed) on Lama Pass, and to Shearwater. For many years Shearwater used the name "Bella Bella" until it was recently transferred to the Heiltsuk village of Bella Bella (also known as Waglisla).

The name "Bella Bella" was initially applied to the Heiltsuk village located at McLoughlin Bay but when the store (and associated post office) closed the name was transferred to Denny Island, first at the cannery, then to Shearwater on Denny Island, British Columbia, which is now known as Shearwater, was known as Bella Bella Airbase from 1948 to 1952 and though renamed to Shearwater, the Bella Bella post office stayed at that location

Today the town "Bella Bella" refers to "New Bella Bella". The post office "Bella Bella" has now been returned to Campbell Island and the Heiltsuk village.

There are a number of resorts and hotels that are located on Denny Island such as the Shearwater Resort, the Denny Island B&B and the Whiskey Cove B&B. Most of Bella Bella's residents live on Campbell Island (New Bella Bella) but some employees of the Shearwater Resort still live on Denny Island.

== Old Bella Bella today ==
The site now contains a fish processing plant and BC Ferries terminal - McLoughlin Bay, which includes a 'roll-on-roll-off' ramp allowing vehicles access. In addition are several houses, a paved road connecting to the village of Bella Bella, British Columbia.

== See also ==
- Heiltsuk Nation
- Waxvwuisaxv
