= William Fraser Tolmie =

Canadian politician

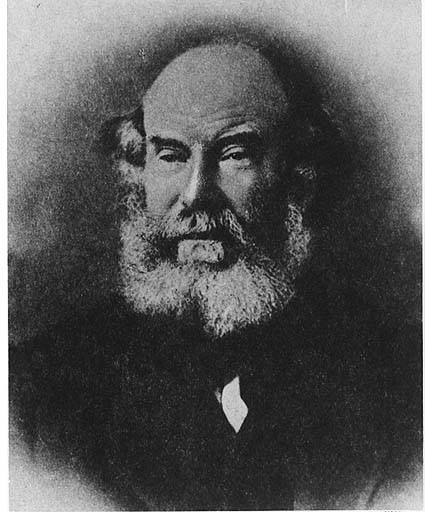
- Born: February 3, 1812; Inverness, Scotland
- Died: December 8, 1886 (aged 74) near Victoria, British Columbia
- Burial place: Ross Bay Cemetery
- Education: Royal College of Physicians and Surgeons of Glasgow (Lic.)
- Occupations: Doctor, scientist, fur trader, and politician
- Spouse: Jane Work (m. 1850)
- Children: 12, including Simon Fraser Tolmie

William Fraser Tolmie (a.k.a. "Dr. Tolmie") (February 3, 1812 – December 8, 1886) was a surgeon, fur trader, scientist, and politician.

He was born in Inverness, Scotland, in 1812, and by 1833 moved to the Pacific Northwest in the service of the Hudson's Bay Company (HBC). He served for two years, 1832-33 at Fort McLoughlin. He served at Fort Nisqually, an HBC post at the southern end of Puget Sound, from 1843 to 1859. In 1859 he moved to Victoria, British Columbia, where he continued serving the HBC as well as becoming active in politics.

His written works include Comparative Vocabulary of the Indian Tribes of British Columbia (1884), and his journals, published in 1963 as The Journals of William Fraser Tolmie.

== Early career ==
At the age of 20, having spent 3 years attending medical classes at the University of Glasgow, Tolmie qualified as a Licentiate of the Faculty of Physicians and Surgeons of Glasgow, after which he joined the Hudson's Bay Company and soon sailed for the Pacific Northwest. In the spring of 1833 he arrived at Fort Vancouver. Soon after arriving he was sent to the proposed site for Fort Nisqually, at the southern end of Puget Sound near the Nisqually River delta. The route was via canoe up the Cowlitz River then overland by horse. Tolmie's journal provides the first detailed account of this route, today essentially that of Interstate 5.

Tolmie stayed at the newly built Fort Nisqually for seven months, until December 1833.

In June 1833 there was an earthquake at Fort Nisqually. Tolmie's journal entry about it is the first recorded eyewitness description of an earthquake in the Puget Sound region.

While at Nisqually he wrote in his journal about nearby Mount Rainier and his desire to see it more closely. In August 1833 he arranged a "botanizing excursion" to the mountain, with Lachalet, a Nisqually, and Nuckalkat, a Puyallup, as guides. Three other Native Americans joined the party. They traveled through the thick forests, following the general course of the Puyallup River to the Mowich River and into what is today the northwest part of Mount Rainier National Park. Wanting to reach the snow level, Tolmie chose the nearest snowy peak and climbed it with Lachalet and Nuckalkat. Tolmie Peak is named for this event, although it is not known exactly which peak was summited. During the expedition, Dr. Tolmie discovered a new species of plant which is now known as Tolmie's saxifrage (Micranthes tolmiei). Due to this trip, Dr. Tolmie was the first European to explore the Puyallup River valley and Mount Rainier.

Dr. Tolmie wanted to improve the area's relationship with the native Indians and couldn't agree with the prevailing point of view to convert the natives to Christianity. As a result of this crisis of conscience, he took a leave of absence to London and France, where he did postgraduate courses for two years. When he returned, he was appointed superintendent of the Puget Sound Agriculture Company's farm, a subsidiary of the Hudson Bay Company.

At the end of 1833, Tolmie went to the HBC post of Fort Simpson before returning to Europe. In 1834 and 1835 he served at the new HBC post of Fort McLoughlin.

== Fort McLoughlin ==
Dr. Tolmie served at Fort McLoughlin, adjacent to Old Bella Bella during the early operation of the fort. Descriptions of his time at the fort include insights to Heiltsuk and other First Nations at the time, including attendance at a potlatch in Heiltsuk country. In 1835, Dr. Tolmie spent 10 days with area natives, and with their help, discovered high-quality coal which, before the opening of mines soon after, needed to be imported from Britain.

== Commander of Fort Nisqually ==
In 1843 Dr. Tolmie returned to Fort Nisqually (also called "Nisqually House" and "Nisqually Station"). When he returned in 1843 he decided to relocate the fort closer to the Edmond Marsh and Sequalitchew creek in order to have better access to fresh water. He served at Nisqually from 1843 to 1859. In 1847 he was promoted to Chief Trader, and in 1855 to Chief Factor. He worked to achieve good relationships with the region's Native Americans and the growing number of United States settlers.

While employed at Fort Nisqually, Dr. Tolmie continued his study of botany. Many of the medicinal plants and other specimens he was taught about by locals as well as discovered in his own right were sent to William. J. Hooker, director of the Kew Gardens in London. Dr. Tolmie also studied phrenology, a pseudoscientific study of the skull. In 1846 Tolmie served as a legislator in the Provisional Legislature of Oregon representing Lewis County and HBC interests.

== Further Interactions with Native Americans ==
In 1857, Dr. Tolmie supported Chief Leschi, who was being tried for murders related to the Puget Sound War of 1855-1856. Tolmie visited the sites where Leschi was alleged to have been, measured distances, and determined it was impossible for Leschi to have made the trip to the murder site in the time required. Nonetheless, Leschi was executed in 1858. Later, the trial was judged to have been unlawfully conducted, the execution wrong, and Leschi innocent.

Dr. Tolmie was credited with saving the American Puget Sound settlement from a war among the natives. In a testimonial letter, William W. Miller, superintendent of Indian affairs for Washington Territory, wrote: "We are indebted to him for saving life and property, and for his influence on the Indians of Puget Sound. In our Indian wars of 1855/56, he laboured successfully to divert the horrors."

Another testimonial, printed in the Victoria Daily Standard stated, "Dr. Tolmie did much to mollify savage dispositions by his able management of the Indians some quarter of a century, thus paving the way for peaceful occupation of the west."

In 1884, Dr. Tolmie collaborated with G.M. Dawson in the research and production of an exhaustive vocabulary of Pacific coast Indian dialects. In 1885, Dr. Tolmie Published Utilization of the Indians of British Columbia. It stands as a work of advocacy towards the Native Americans of the Pacific Northwest. In it he condemned the national government for its neglect of an entire group of people.

== Vancouver Island ==
In 1859 the Hudson's Bay Company transferred Tolmie to Fort Victoria on Vancouver Island. He served on the HBC Board of Management from 1861 to 1870, retiring from the company in 1871.

In addition to working for the HBC, Tolmie became active in politics. He was a member of the Legislative Assembly of Vancouver Island from 1860 to 1866 and a member of the Legislative Assembly of British Columbia from 1874 to 1878.

He continued to study indigenous languages until his death on December 8, 1886.

== Family ==
In 1850, Tolmie married Jane Work when she was 23 years old, and he 38. She was a daughter of John Work and Josette Legacée, an Indigenous woman whose mother was from the Spokane tribe. They had twelve children, seven boys and five girls. They lived first at Fort Nisqually, then at Victoria, where their farm home adjoined the Work family's Hillside Farm. The Work and Tolmie cousins grew up together.

Tolmie's son, Simon Fraser Tolmie, was the twenty-first Premier of British Columbia.

== Legacy ==
William Fraser Tolmie's name is associated with Tolmie Peak near Mount Rainier and Tolmie's saxifrage (Micranthes tolmiei), which he discovered there. Tolmie State Park in Washington is named for him, as are Mount Tolmie, Tolmie Channel, and Tolmie Point in British Columbia. Tolmie Street in Vancouver is also named for him. Other plants bearing his name include Tolmie's star-tulip (Calochortus tolmiei) and Tolmie's onion (Allium tolmiei). The scientific name of MacGillivray's warbler is also named for him: Oporornis tolmiei.

== See also ==
- John McLoughlin
- Fort McLoughlin
- Old Bella Bella
