= Fort McLoughlin =

Coordinates: 52°09′43″N 128°08′42″W

- Fur Trade Outpost
- Constructed: 1833
- Location: Campbell Island in present-day British Columbia, Canada.
- Continent: North America
- Later Ownership: Hudson's Bay Company

Fort McLoughlin was a fur trading post established in 1833 by the Hudson's Bay Company (HBC) on Campbell Island in present-day British Columbia, Canada. At the time, the Hudson's Bay Company performed quasi-governmental duties on behalf of the British Empire and participated in trade for profit. The site is believed to have been at McLoughlin Bay on the northeast side of Campbell Island and is associated with the relocation of the Heiltsuk community of Bella Bella from its former location on islets near Denny Island. The McLoughlin name, which is that of John McLoughlin, regional head of company operations at that time, is also found in a lake and a creek entering that bay, and was conferred on these locations after the fort had closed.

== Background ==
One of the primary reasons for the establishment of Fort McLoughlin, as well as Fort Simpson to the north, was to undermine the American dominance of the Maritime Fur Trade. By 1830 the higher prices paid for furs by American coastal traders had resulted in an Indigenous fur trading system that diverted furs from the Interior's New Caledonia district of the HBC to the coast. Fort McLoughlin and Fort Simpson were built to intercept these furs before they could reach American traders, who had no permanent posts on the coast. The strategy was ultimately successful. By 1837 American competition was essentially over. Furs from the interior reached the coast along Indigenous pathways, or "grease trails," one of which had been followed by Alexander MacKenzie in 1793. By the late 1830s HBC traders of New Caledonia were complaining that their furs were finding their way to Fort McLoughlin, where they were fetching higher prices. By the end of the decade, with American competition reduced, the HBC was able to fix prices uniformly and eliminate much of the flow of furs to the coast, which by its nature was less secure than the Interior. Scottish doctor and fur-trader William Fraser Tolmie was stationed at Fort McLoughlin, writing a journal for a portion of this time.

== Operations ==
Fort McLoughlin was built in May or June, 1833, on a protected bay on Campbell Island, at Lama Passage in Fitz Hugh Sound, part of what today is called the Inside Passage. At first the post was known simply as Milbanke Sound, after its ocean access. Included in the initial staff of Fort McLoughlin were nine Hawaiian Kanakas previously stationed at Fort Simpson. The fort was situated in the midst of a densely populated Indigenous area.

In 1833, the Hudson's Bay Company named the trading post Fort McLoughlin, and it eventually became a gathering place for local Indigenous peoples. The fort became known as Bella Bella, a name adopted from company officers referring to the local Heiltsuk community. Dr. Tolmie, stationed at Fort McLoughlin between 1833 and 1834, gives the name of the principal tribe as the Bil-Billa or Haeeltzuk Indians; John Dunn, trader and interpreter, also stationed here about the same date, and again later spells the name Bel-Bellahs.

George Simpson, wrote that the fort was near a village of about 500 "Ballabollas" (Bella Bellas, known properly as the Heiltsuk). William Fraser Tolmie, who was stationed at the fort during its early years, wrote about "Quaghcuils" (Kwakwaka'wakw, possibly specifically the Kwagu'ł of Fort Rupert), "Kitamats" (Kitimaat, a Haisla subgroup), and "Chimnseyans" (Tsimshians) trading there, in addition to the Nuxálk. Duncan Finlayson wrote in 1836 that Indigenous People trading at Fort McLoughlin included the "Bela Hoola" (Bella Coola), the "Wacash tribe of Milbank Sound" (the Xaixais, today located at Klemtu), the "Oyalla tribe", and the "Chichysh". Charles Ross, who took over command of the fort in 1842, estimated the local "Billbillah" population at 1,500, and the "Bellwhoola" at 650.

Although successful in the fur trade, Fort McLoughlin was not self-sufficient in food. Supplies were brought annually from Fort Langley, Fort Nisqually, and Fort Simpson. In 1841 Sir George Simpson wrote that Fort McLoughlin was visited by about 5,200 Indigenous peoples from seven main villages, trading furs worth about 2,500 to 3,000 pounds sterling. Both Simpson and Alexander Ross agreed that the fort's annual profit was about 1,500 pounds.

The Heiltsuk community of Old Bella Bella (then known simply as Bella Bella, or its alternate name Qlts) developed by the fort during its operations and continued after the fort's closure.

== Closure ==
Fort McLoughlin was closed by Sir George Simpson in the early 1840s because the HBC's steamship Beaver was able to collect furs along the coast without the need for permanent posts. Although the fort was said to be wholly abandoned in 1843, with its men and stores transferred to establish Fort Victoria and certain articles transferred to Fort Rupert in 1849, the site remained in use from time to time until 1878.

One report states that the Heiltsuk burned the abandoned fort; "The Indians who had gathered around the fort, left to their own devices, immediately burned it down to obtain the iron used in its construction, and nothing now remains of this early trading post."

The Hudson's Bay Company had a change of heart, and established a store on the site of the former fort. "It operated for many years but finally the pendulum swung back and in May 1883 the premises were rented to John Clayton of Bella Coola, for $5.00 per month."

The Heiltsuk community of Old Bella Bella (then - simply - 'Bella Bella') remained on the site after the departure of the Hudson's Bay Company.

== See also ==
- Old Bella Bella
- Bella Bella, BC
- Heiltsuk Nation
- Maritime fur trade
