= Bella Bella, British Columbia =

Bella Bella Waglisla
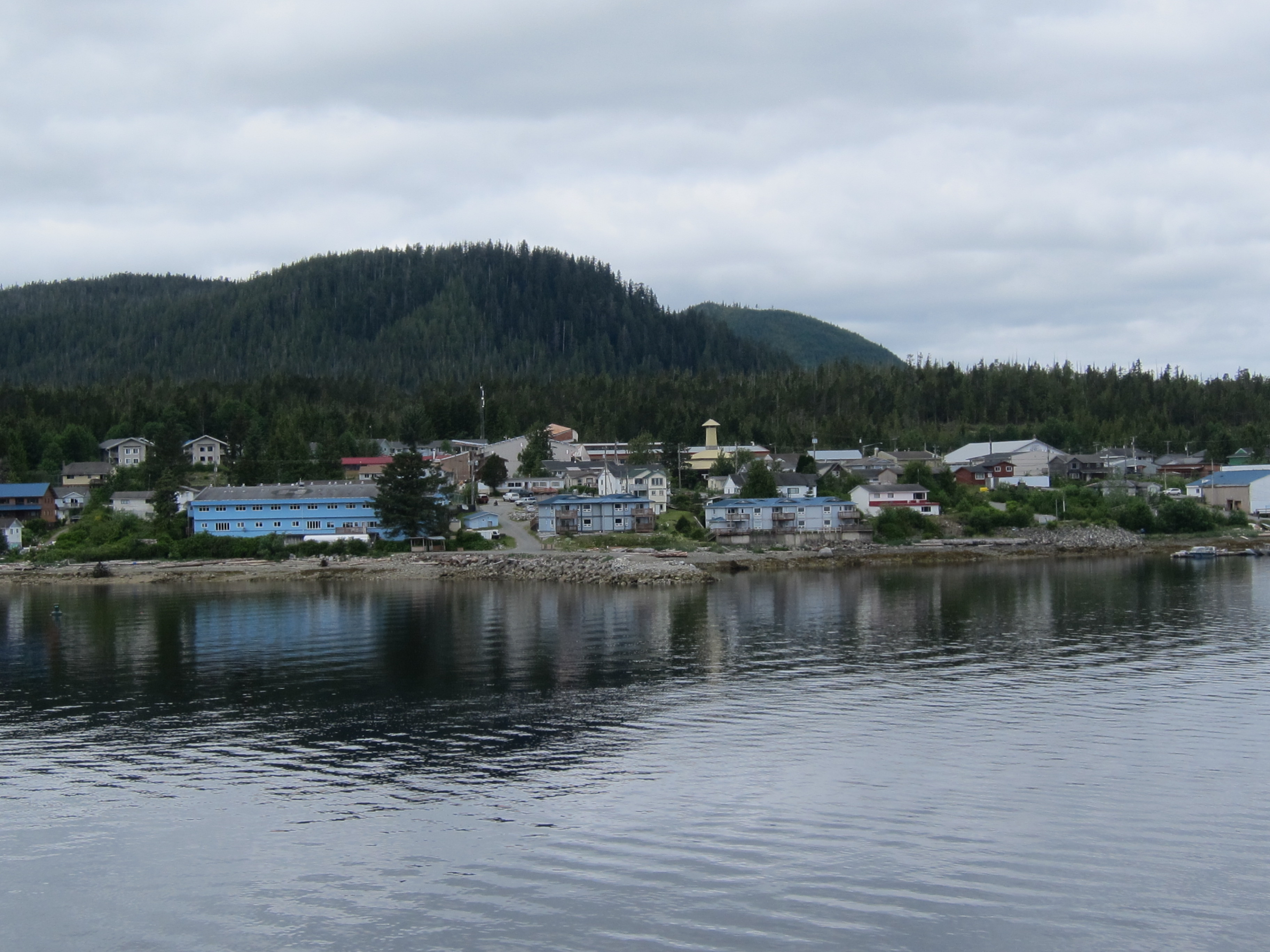
- Bella Bella from the water
- Nickname: The Rock
- Location of Bella Bella in British Columbia
- Coordinates: 52°09′43″N 128°08′42″W
- Country: Canada
- Province: British Columbia
- Regional district: Central Coast
- First settled: 7800–7000 BCE

Area
  - Total: 5.83 km^{2} (2.25 sq mi)
- Elevation: 21 m (69 ft)

Population (2021)
  - Total: 1,193
  - Density: 204.5/km^{2} (530/sq mi)
- Time zone: UTC–8:00
  - Summer (DST): UTC–7:00 (Pacific Daylight Time)
- Postal code: V0T 1Z0
- Area codes: 250, 778 236
- Website: heiltsuknation.ca

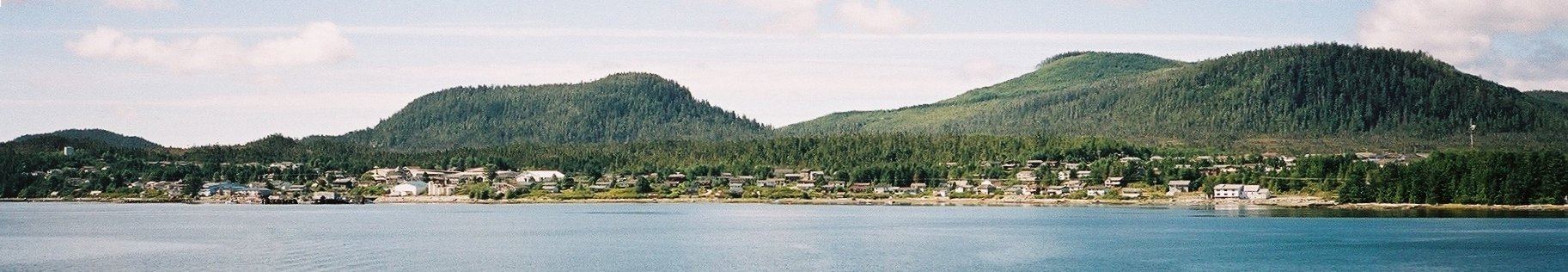
Bella Bella

Bella Bella, also known as Waglisla, is the capital of the Heiltsuk and is an unincorporated community and Indian reserve community located within Bella Bella Indian Reserve No. 1 on the east coast of Campbell Island in the Central Coast region of British Columbia, Canada. Bella Bella is located 98 nautical miles (181 km) north of Port Hardy, on Vancouver Island, and 78 nautical miles (144 km) west of Bella Coola. The community is on Lama Passage, part of the Inside Passage – a transportation route linking the area, and northern British Columbia as well as Alaska for marine vessels carrying cargo, passengers and recreational boaters from the south coast. The settlement "forms a national capital of sorts" to the Heiltsuk.

Founded between 1897 and 1903, Bella Bella is located on Campbell Island.

Originally styled New Bella Bella to distinguish it from "Bella Bella", the community's official post office name for some time was Waglisla, meaning "river on the beach" in the Heiltsuk language. Old Bella Bella is the Heiltsuk village site located south of the current village that was known as Bella Bella. As it grew, a post office was located in the store. When the Heiltsuk relocated their settlement to the north, the post office, and the name Bella Bella, moved – first to the store in the BC Packers Cannery, then to the village of Shearwater. The post office name was retained while moving location several times. This is a source of confusion and the reason 'Bella Bella' sometimes appears on Denny Island rather than Campbell Island on some Provincial maps.

The Hudson's Bay Company's Fort McLoughlin was near the same location, which is on McLoughlin Bay.

With a population of 1,400, Bella Bella is the largest community to be found on the Central Coast north of Queen Charlotte Strait. It is home to the Heiltsuk First Nation. Like many small communities on the coast, such as nearby Ocean Falls, Bella Bella has had a precarious and isolated existence. The closing of coastal cannery towns and decreased need for coastal shipping reduced the importance of Bella Bella's port.

However, the resumption of ferry services by BC Ferries and the introduction of an air link from Vancouver via Port Hardy by Pacific Coastal Airlines have revived Bella Bella. There are scheduled flights from Bella Bella (Campbell Island) Airport onward to Klemtu and Ocean Falls. Services in Bella Bella include a large general store, the Bella Bella Community School, Alexa's restaurant, the Koeye Cafe, the Thistalalh Memorial Library, an RCMP police station (with a circuit court every 1.5 months), the Bella Bella Medical Clinic, staffed by 3 physicians and a nurse practitioner, and ƛ̓uxválásu̓ilas (pronounced kwil-valas-iwaylas) Heiltsuk Hospital (formerly R.W. Large Memorial Hospital) and its pharmacy. The CIBC bank branch closed in 2007.

The village of Bella Bella was previously known as Waglisla to the Canadian Postal Service; the postal address changed to Bella Bella (V0T 1Z0) in October 2007.

== History ==
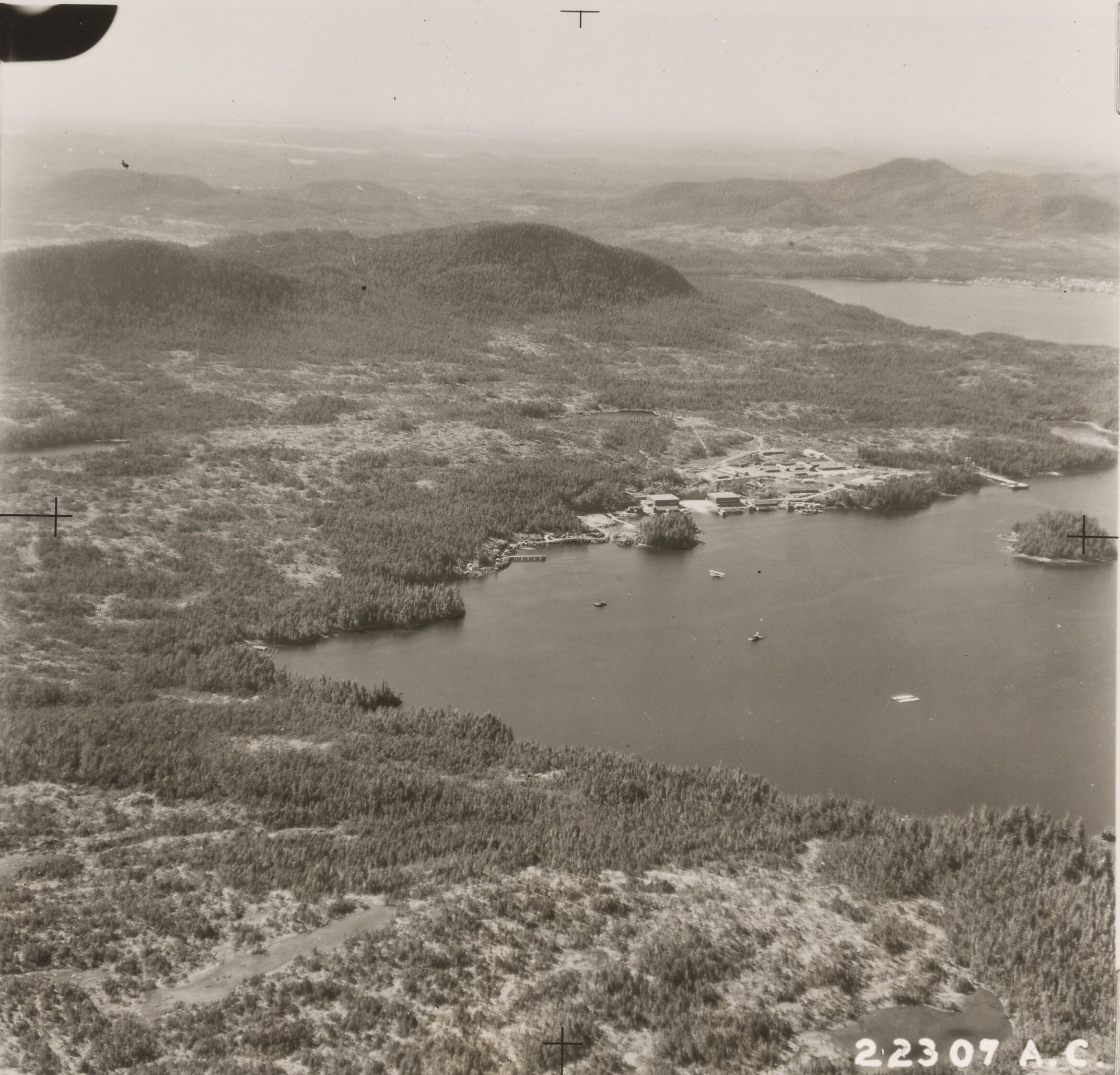
View of Bella Bella in 1942

Bella Bella is a Heiltsuk village situated on Campbell Island, British Columbia. Today Bella Bella is the main Heiltsuk community within Heiltsuk country. The village was initially located at McLoughlin Bay, south of the current location but moved between 1898 and the early 20th Century to the present site. Heiltsuk's oral history tells of a dispute with the store owner in the original town. The store owner had acquired the land that had been the old HBC fort and would not allow the community to expand on 'his' land – prompting the entire community to abandon the site and move to a larger site – the present location of the village.

During the early period, Bella Bella was composed of relatively new European-style houses and a boardwalk. By 1903 the new town was fairly well established. The mission was complete with a hospital, mission house, and school which doubled as a church.

Methodist missionaries played a significant role during this period, functioning as colonial agents, magistrates, ministers, as well as medical doctors. A missionary hospital was established, as well as a church and school. The current hospital in Bella Bella evolved from this early missionary hospital.

"The one-room school stood in a clearing beside the church, at the fringe of the dense bush that stubbornly tried to reclaim the half-mile stretch of territory occupied by the village."

Confusion over the name and location of 'Bella Bella'

The origin of the name Bella Bella has several stories. It originally was associated with the Heiltsuk people and the community of Heiltsuk people that developed where the Hudson Bay Company built Fort McLoughlin.

Fort McLoughlin operated between 1832 and 1842. When the fort was closed, the village remained. At some point, a white trader acquired a 'legal' title to the land that the fort had occupied. This trader operated a store for some time on the site during the late 1800s. His store incorporated a postal service – using the name Bella Bella. When the Heiltsuk relocated to the current site of Bella Bella – the store went out of business and the postal operation was moved across the channel to the BC Packers cannery site. Eventually, this also closed and the postal service was moved to the small non-Aboriginal community of Shearwater. When the Heiltsuk began operating a postal service in their community – the name Bella Bella was not available – so the alternate name – Waglisla was used.

After several years of effort – the Heiltsuk were able to have the name Bella Bella returned to the postal service in the community. The name was changed in 2007. As a result of this history – the name Bella Bella can be seen in four locations on the Central Coast maps – depending on when they were created and how up-to-date they are.

1897–1903

The Heiltsuk move their community from McLoughlin Bay (Qelc or Old Bella Bella) to the site of the present-day village of Bella Bella, BC.

1903

By 1903 New Bella Bella, now just known as Bella Bella (aka Waglisla), was fairly well established following the move from McLoughlin Bay.

1913, August

Canadian Royal Commission known as the McKenna-McBride Commission visits Bella Bella.

1975 The Canadian National Film Board (NFB) documentary "Bella Bella"

1993 'Qatuwas Canoe Festival

In 1993 the Heiltsuk hosted an ocean-going canoe festival at Bella Bella. Called 'Qatuwas – the event was an important milestone in the ongoing renaissance in Northwest Coast Ocean-going canoes. Some 25 canoes from First Nations up and down the coast paddled to Bella Bella for a week-long cultural sharing event.

1997 R. v. Gladstone

The Supreme Court of Canada recognized the Heiltsuk have a pre-existing Aboriginal right to herring that entails a commercial component.

2014 'Qatuwas Canoe Festival

A second 'Qatuwas festival was held in Bella Bella in 2014.

2015 Herring Crisis

The 2015 herring season saw a crisis erupt over a long-simmering dispute between the Heiltsuk and Canada (DFO). Citing concern for the stocks and Heiltsuk rights, as well as taking issue with DFO predictive models, the Heiltsuk occupied the local DFO office for 4 days. The crisis abated when the remainder of the commercial herring fleet departed and the Heiltsuk and Canada agreed to discuss the next season's management.

June 30, 2015 Potlatch in Bella Bella to ratify the Heiltsuk-Haida Peace treaty, a formal agreement that builds on the peace treaty of 1852 that ended the war between the two Nations.

== Geology ==
The 13-million-year-old mafic dike swarms in the Bella Bella area were formed by the Anahim hotspot when this part of North America was directly overhead. The dikes are believed to mark the first arrival of the hotspot, although it is now located in central British Columbia at Nazko Cone.

== Climate ==
Climate data for Bella Bella (Dryad Point Lighthouse) (1981–2010)
Month	Jan	Feb	Mar	Apr	May	Jun	Jul	Aug	Sep	Oct	Nov	Dec	Year
Record high °C (°F)	17.5 (63.5)	19.5 (67.1)	22.5 (72.5)	25.0 (77.0)	31.3 (88.3)	31.5 (88.7)	31.5 (88.7)	31.5 (88.7)	29.0 (84.2)	22.0 (71.6)	18.5 (65.3)	17.5 (63.5)	31.5 (88.7)
Mean daily maximum °C (°F)	6.5 (43.7)	7.3 (45.1)	9.0 (48.2)	11.5 (52.7)	14.5 (58.1)	17.0 (62.6)	19.0 (66.2)	19.4 (66.9)	16.7 (62.1)	12.3 (54.1)	8.3 (46.9)	6.5 (43.7)	12.3 (54.2)
Daily mean °C (°F)	4.2 (39.6)	4.7 (40.5)	6.0 (42.8)	8.1 (46.6)	11.0 (51.8)	13.5 (56.3)	15.4 (59.7)	15.9 (60.6)	13.6 (56.5)	9.8 (49.6)	6.1 (43.0)	4.4 (39.9)	9.4 (48.9)
Mean daily minimum °C (°F)	2.0 (35.6)	2.1 (35.8)	3.0 (37.4)	4.6 (40.3)	7.3 (45.1)	9.9 (49.8)	11.8 (53.2)	12.3 (54.1)	10.3 (50.5)	7.3 (45.1)	3.9 (39.0)	2.2 (36.0)	6.4 (43.5)
Record low °C (°F)	−14.0 (6.8)	−19.5 (−3.1)	−10.0 (14.0)	−2.8 (27.0)	1.5 (34.7)	4.5 (40.1)	6.4 (43.5)	7.5 (45.5)	2.4 (36.3)	−7.0 (19.4)	−19.0 (−2.2)	−13.0 (8.6)	−19.5 (−3.1)
Average precipitation mm (inches)	279.7 (11.01)	210.5 (8.29)	209.2 (8.24)	203.3 (8.00)	156.9 (6.18)	143.3 (5.64)	117.1 (4.61)	145.4 (5.72)	208.0 (8.19)	333.5 (13.13)	347.2 (13.67)	274.5 (10.81)	2,628.6 (103.49)
Average snowfall cm (inches)	10.7 (4.2)	16.0 (6.3)	3.7 (1.5)	1.5 (0.6)	0.1 (0.0)	0.0 (0.0)	0.0 (0.0)	0.0 (0.0)	0.0 (0.0)	0.3 (0.1)	2.3 (0.9)	10.6 (4.2)	45.1 (17.8)
Average precipitation days (≥ 0.2 mm)	23.1	19.7	23.2	21.1	20.0	18.4	16.2	16.4	19.5	24.2	24.9	24.2	250.9
Average snowy days (≥ 0.2 cm)	2.6	2.3	1.9	0.85	0.19	0.0	0.0	0.0	0.0	0.27	1.2	3.0	12.3
Source: Environment and Climate Change Canada

== See also ==
- Bella Bella (Campbell Island) Airport
- Fort McLoughlin
- Heiltsuk
- Heiltsuk Nation
- List of reduplicated place names
- Old Bella Bella
- R v Gladstone
- Tribal Canoe Journeys
