= Waxvwuisaxv =

Country of the Heiltsuk Nation

W̓áxv:w̓uísax̌v Haíɫzaqv W̓áwís Heiltsuk Country
- Time immemorial
- Map of W̓áxv:w̓uísax̌v, the territory of the Heiltsuk nation
- Main Reservation: Waglisla
- Common languages: Haíɫzaqvḷa, English, Chinook Jargon (historical)
- Government: ̌Gvilas
- Legislature: Joint Leadership Assembly
  - Upper house: Yím̓as Council
  - Lower house: Tribal Council
- History
  - Established: Time immemorial
  - Construction of Fort McLoughlin: 1833
  - Smallpox epidemic: 1862
  - Potlatch ban: 1884
  - Reservation enacted: 1889
  - Potlatch ban lifted: 1951
  - New Constitution: 2025

Area
- 1899: 35,735 km^{2} (13,797 sq mi)

Population
  - Pre-invasion: ~40,000
  - 1899: ~300
  - Present (2024): 2,534

- People: Haíɫzaqv (Heiltsuk)
- Language: Haíɫzaqvḷa
- Country: W̓áxv:w̓uísax̌v (Waxvwuisaxv)

Waxvwuisaxv /wɑːkswuːiːsɑːhv/ (Heiltsuk: W̓áxv:w̓uísax̌v) is the unceded traditional territory, jurisdiction and country of the Heiltsuk nation. It is also called Haíɫzaqv W̓áwís and Heiltsuk Country. Waxvwuisaxv includes "the land, the submerged land, the surface water, the groundwater, the ocean, the sub-surface[, ]the air space" and over 17,000 square kilometres of territorial waters. Waxvwuisaxv also includes the Heiltsuk's relationship with their territory, with Waxvwuisaxv sometimes being translated as, 'We take good care of our territories'.

== Biogeography ==
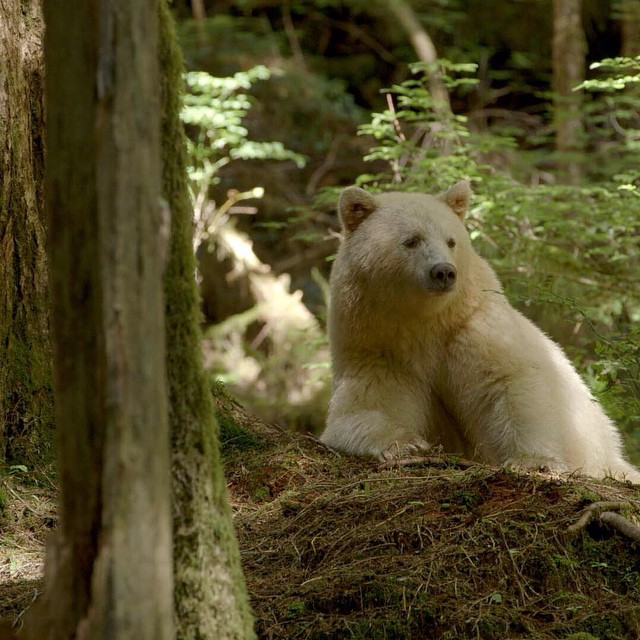
Picture of a Kermode bear, a rare kind of black bear that has white colored fur.

Waxvwuisaxv is part of Cascadia and encompasses 35,553 square kilometres of inlets, islands and mountains. It flanks the central Inside Passage, from Calvert Island in the south to Milbanke Sound in the north, inland as far as Kimsquit and expanding for miles into the Pacific Ocean. The country is famous for being part of the Great Bear Rainforest, which sustains much of the Earth's remaining coastal temperate rainforests and wild salmon stocks. The forest is dominated by old growth western red cedar and Sitka spruce trees. The rainforest has a population of grizzly bears and the only known population of religiously important spirit bears. Due to logging by the Canadian government, a supermajority of the old growth trees of Waxvwuisaxv have been cut.

Bears are an important part of the cultural and religious geography of Waxvwuisaxv and are part of many Heiltsuk songs, dances and lineage crests. Grizzly bears regularly travel between the human and spirit worlds and can even transform into humans.

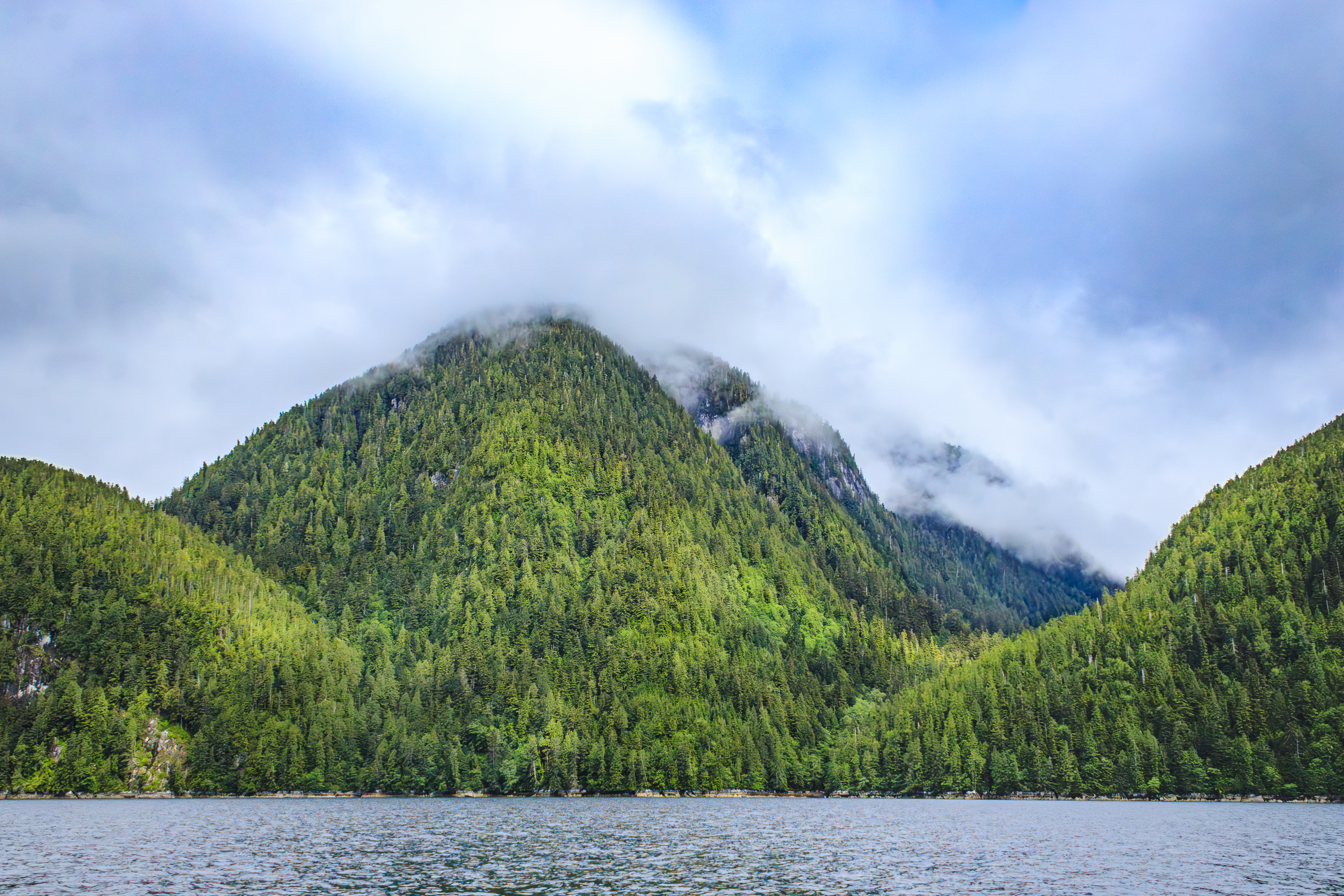
North shore of Pooley Island in the Great Bear Rainforest of Waxvwuisaxv.

In the coastal waters of Waxvwuisaxv are vast kelp forests. In spring, schools of herring (called wán̓ái by the Heiltsuk) come from the Pacific Ocean into the Inside Passage to lay their eggs on the kelp, sea grasses and tree branches of the shallow waters for protection. The Heiltsuk have long harvested the herring for food and it is an important food both culturally and politically. According to their religion, the herring were brought to Waxvwuisaxv by Raven. Herring during their spawning season are so abundant they're referred to as Herring balls. Herring populations collapsed around 1968 due to commercial overfishing and never recovered.

Waxvwuisaxv is part of the Pacific Northwest region. It borders Kulhulmcilh, the Wuikinuxv and the Kwakwakawakw to its south. To its north, it borders the Haisla and Tsimshian. Off the western coast sits Haida Gwaii. Waxvwuisaxv overlaps with Canada and British Columbia. The Heiltsuk people themselves currently mostly live on Bella Bella Indian Reserve No. 1 on Campbell Island. Nowadays, about 50% of the Heiltsuk have to live outside of Waxvwuisaxv, mostly in Nanaimo, Vancouver and Victoria. The Heiltsuk in Waxvwuisaxv suffer from unemployment as high as 85% and leave to earn an income so they can survive.

== Heiltsuk lifeways ==
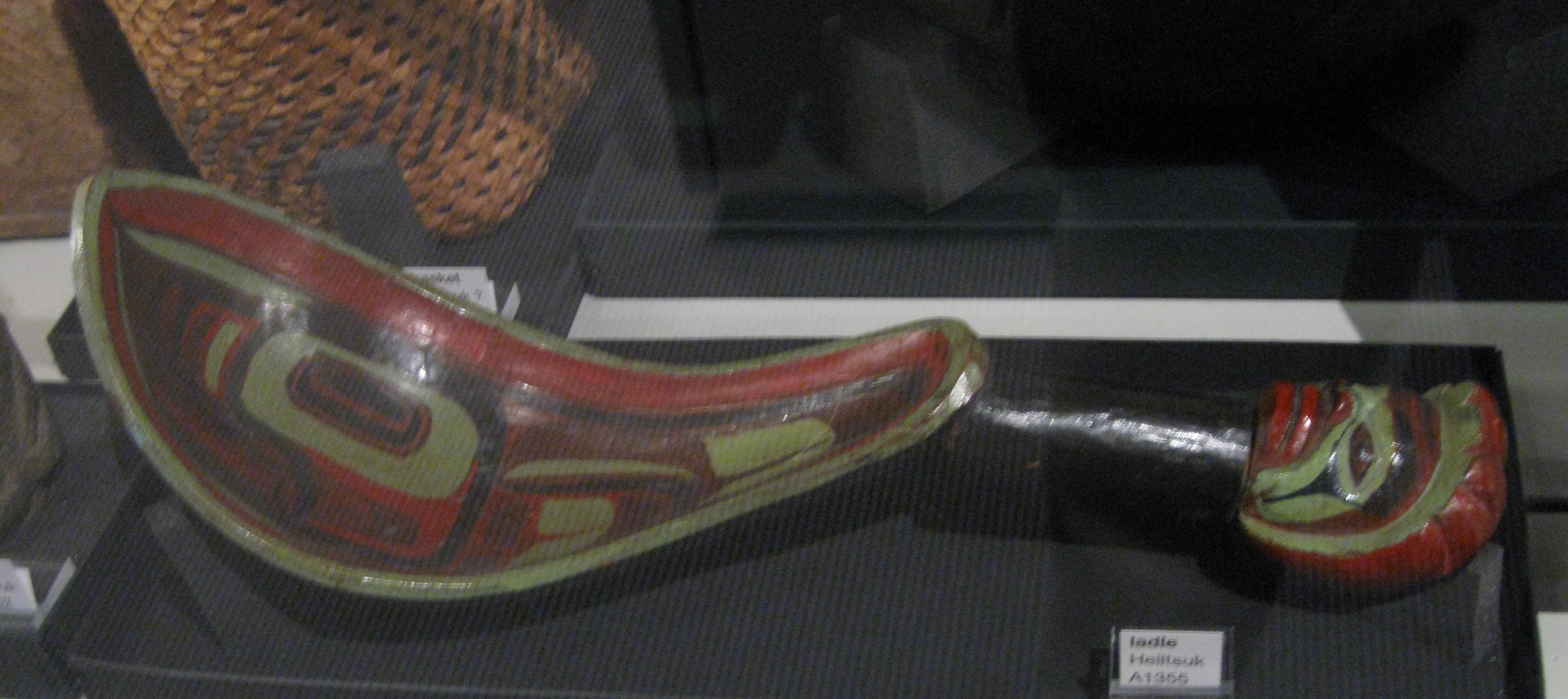
Heiltsuk ladle

Heiltsuk selectively harvest weaker fish when fishing for salmon. This, alongside clearing debris from the rivers, allows the rest of the salmon to move further upstream and breed the next generation. Pacific herring egg harvest season starts in March when herring begin spawning on kelp. Herring themselves are harvested using nets, rakes and fish traps. They then are smoked and dried to be eaten later. When harvesting herrings, the Heiltsuk don't kill all the herring. Instead, they take eggs from kelp fronds and hemlock branches, leaving some eggs behind for the years to come. Harvested herring and their eggs are sometimes traded with neighbors, especially in times of local scarcity. They are also eaten for ceremonial feasting. Herring and salmon are brought to different locations to grow their range and population. For berry picking, some berries are left behind each year. Branches of berry bushes are broken off and spread around to propagate them. Heiltsuk also prune blueberry, huckleberry, currant and salmonberry bushes. Bears are traditionally hunted rarely and not for recreation. Heiltsuk lifeways and knowledge are "...developed through careful observation, experimentation, monitoring, and sampling, perhaps at times driven by shortage or necessity" and are done in accordance with Heiltsuk gvilas.

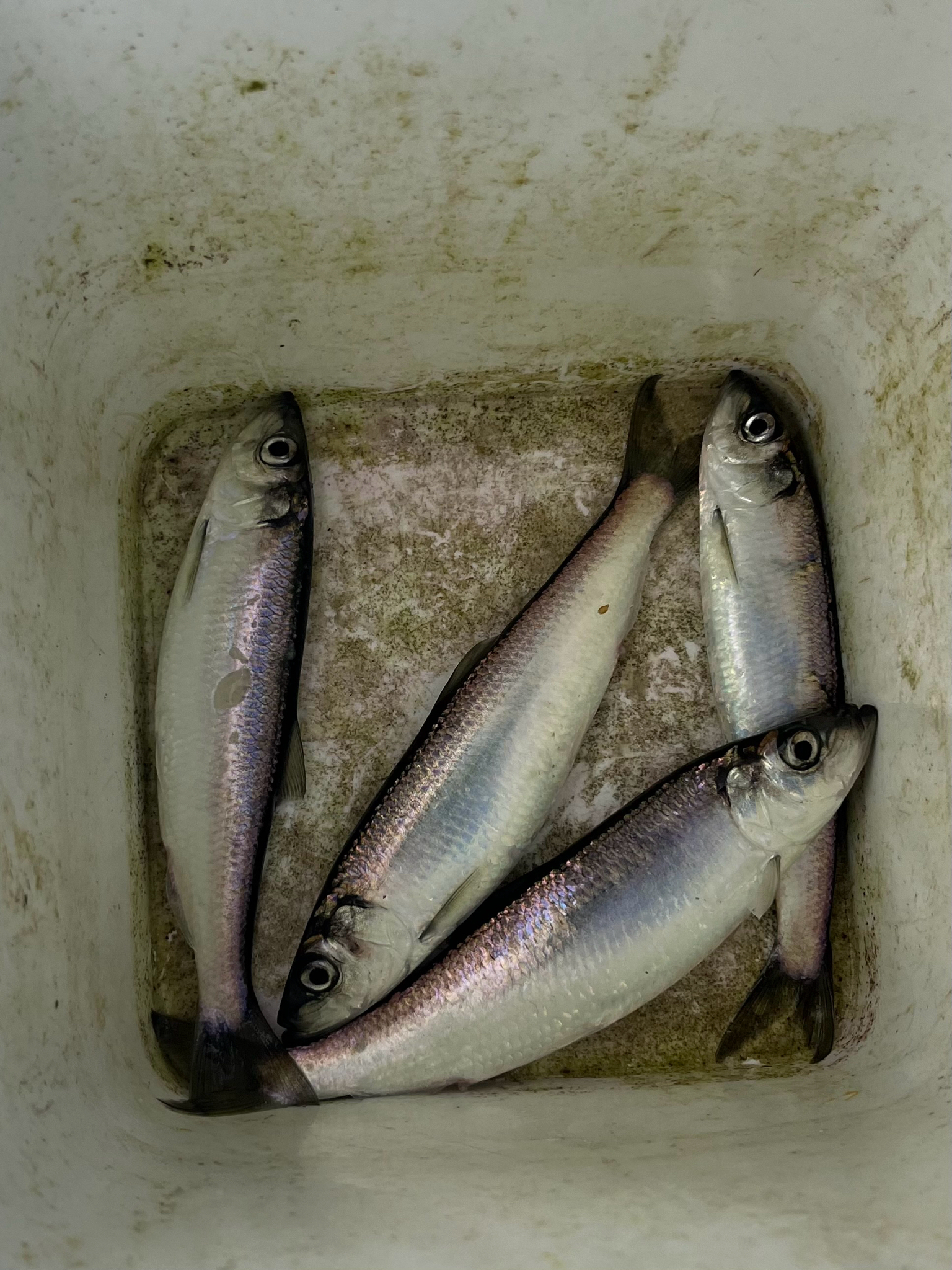
Image of caught Pacific Herring

Harvesting herring involves picking the most suitable place in accordance to the areas' cultural and physical biogeography. Heiltsuk fishers then build herring traps so they can pen herring in and then selectively choose which herring to take. One type of trap is built to be like a fence, which is narrow enough to catch herring. Herring and other fish move past the traps during high tide becoming trapped by the rock walls and fencing when the tide recedes. Before herring populations plummeted, they can be scooped from the water using baskets, nets, buckets and rakes. The remnants of abandoned stone fish traps and fencing are common in Waxvwuisaxv, as they are across the region. These open pens were also used to protect the fish so that they could spawn and leave. During the herring harvest, Heiltsuk refrain from making loud noises and harvesting clams. They also view the herring as sensitive to the presence of blood, so they often set up hunting bans to avoid this.

== Governance ==
Ǧvi̓ḷás are the customary laws governing the Heiltsuk nation, Waxvwuisaxv and the Heiltsuk's relationships with all people (whether spirits, plants, other humans or other animals) living within Waxvwuisaxv. It is the Indigenous legal order of the Heiltsuk. Gvilas embodies the values, beliefs, teachings, actions, experiences and principles of the Heiltsuk people. Gvilas is used by Heiltsuk to balance the health of their land with their own needs. It works toward unity between the various legal persons who each have unique relationships, responsibilities and obligations. Gvilas is also used for foreign relations, such as the recent treaty between the Heiltsuk and Haida in 2015.

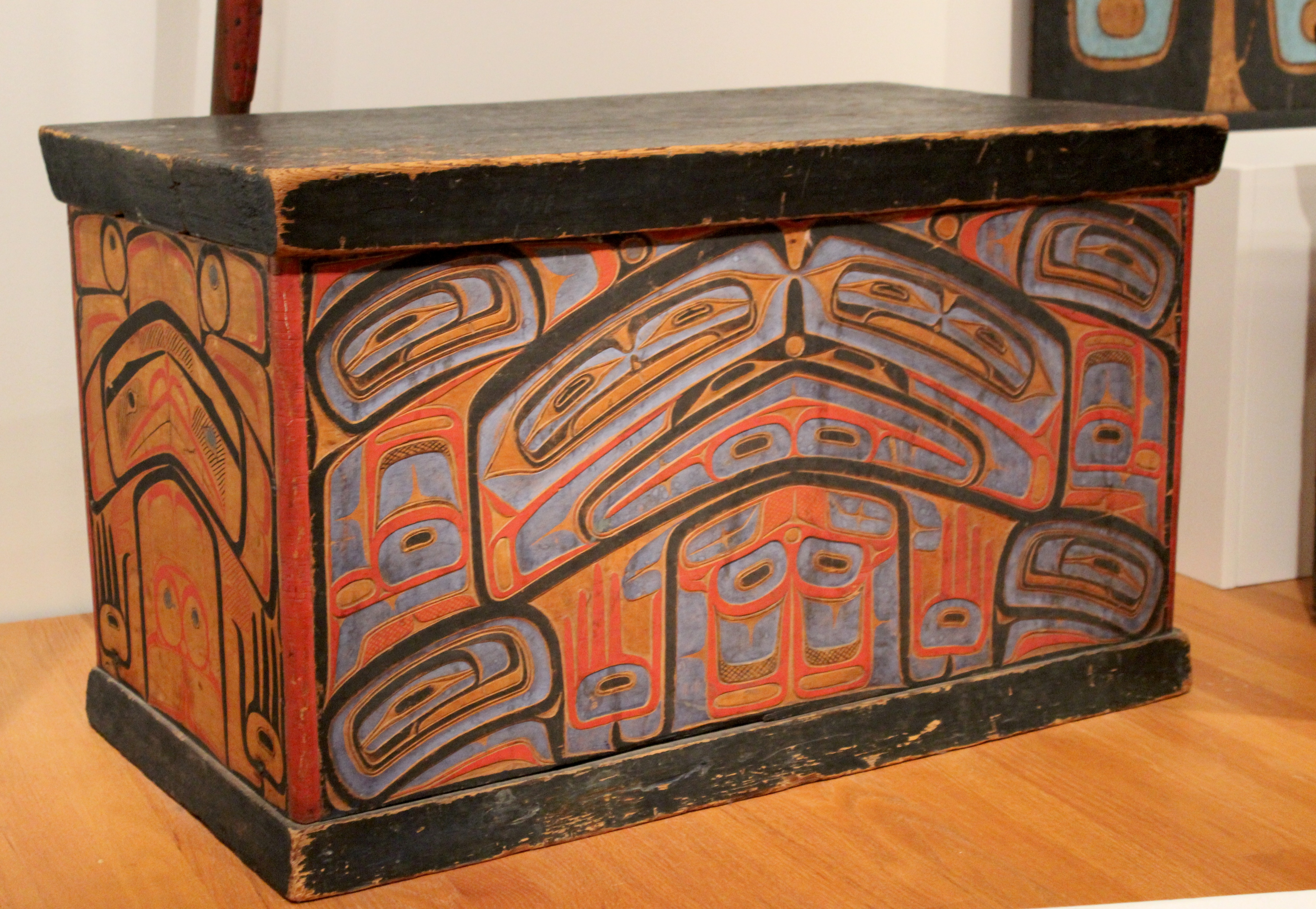
Picture of a Bentwood box which is used for storing property to be gifted out during potlatches.

Potlatches are central to the governance of Waxvwuisaxv. Potlatches are a forum to affirm various legal matters such as marriages, economic transactions, clan membership, adoptions, funerals, social rank, names/offices and land use rights. It is a ceremony that involves speeches, feasting, singing, dances, rituals and gifting. It is held in a large sacred building called a big house. At potlatches, the Yimas discuss the laws of their nation and then revise or reaffirm them if needed.

=== Pre-contact governance ===
The Heiltsuk were originally composed of a further five nested nations who consolidated due to outside pressures: the W̓úyalitx̌v, Q̓vúqvay̓áitx̌v, W̓u̓íƛ̓itx̌v, Y̓ísdáitx̌v and X̌íx̌ís. Some Heiltsuk still identify with these nations. Historically, there were more nations, such as the Ydlaxayitxw, Uwigalidox, Aleqwidexu, Klwalhgnagimix and Nulaewidexu. These nations are made of four matrilineal clans (called Geminuxw) named Raven, Eagle, Killerwhale and Wolf. Heiltsuk nations are also composed of many matrilineal Houses (called Nuyemgiwa, meaning 'carrying forth a mythical narrative'), led by hereditary leaders called Yím̓ás. Yimas are stewards of their House's property and they are given their position as Yimas by being given a unique name that itself possesses the legal authority of the office. These large extended families hold title and rights to their own lands, waters and the resources within Waxvwuisaxv. Decisions regarding these properties are validated at potlatches hosted by the Yimas as part of the Heiltsuk's land tenure system, including access, title and stewardship rights and responsibilities associated with House owned harvesting locations. If someone wants to use the land owned by another House, they have to consult with the Yimas of the owning House. There was a group of people outside the Heiltsuk political system called Xamala (orphans) or Pkws (uninitiated) who owned no property and had no social role, thus were nonpersons without rights or responsibilities. This included unadopted children, prisoners of war, and slaves.

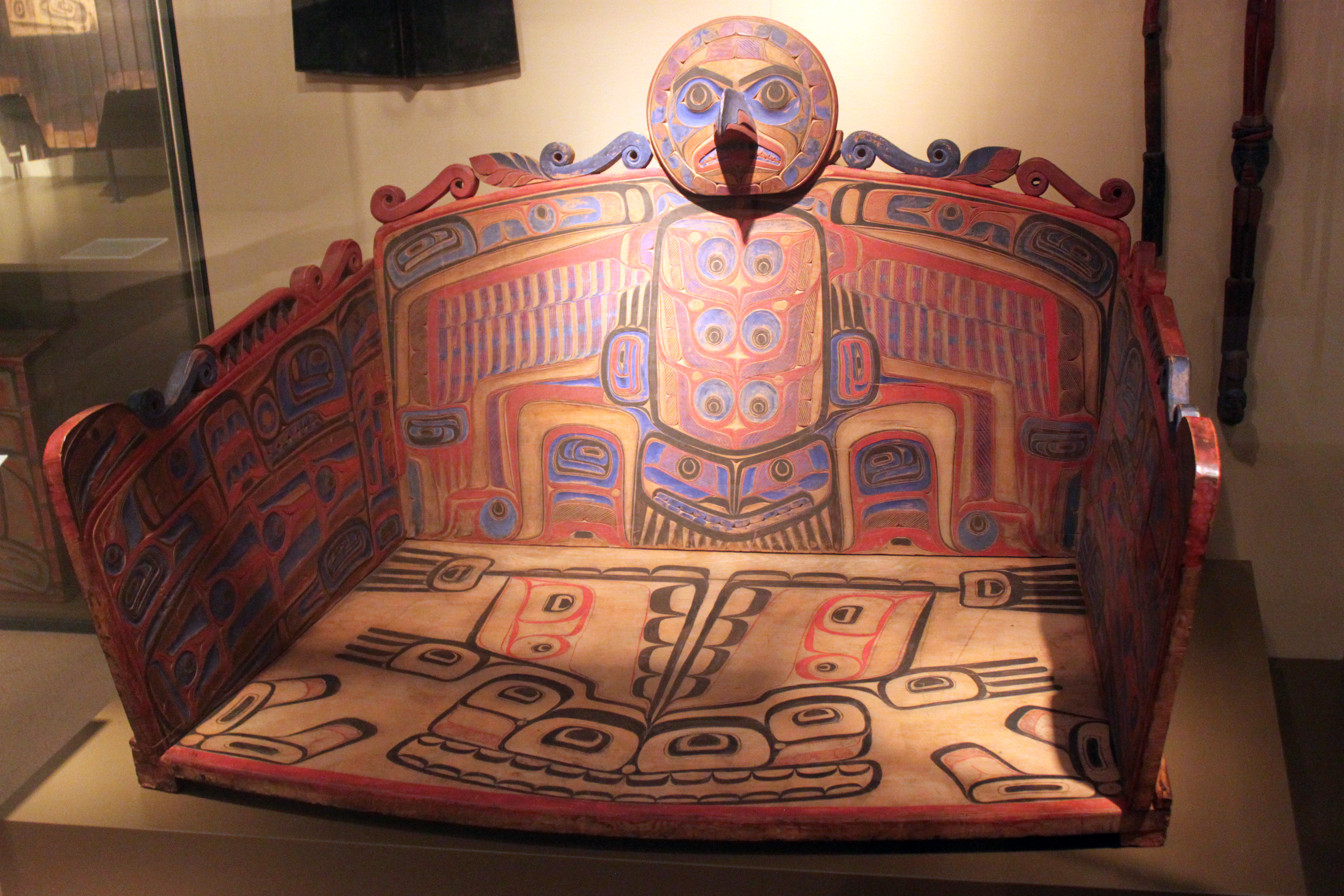
Picture of a ritual seat used by Heiltsuk Yimas

Heiltsuk Houses have their own herring harvesting spots that they manage and are responsible to. These localized territorial rights have a variety of obligations, duties, rules and customs to determine how they should be applied in accordance with Heiltsuk gvilas. Before contact, the Heiltsuk lived in 55 permanent towns and various seasonal camps across Waxvwuisaxv. The trees of the Great Bear Rainforest are used to make tools, clothing, houses, totem poles and canoes. Like the herring harvest locations, tree harvest is regulated by rules of conduct and rules about who can harvest where to ensure the continuity of the forest. These roles and rights are carried by Yimas, who are responsible for their enactment.

During winter, resource gathering was less intensive, so Heiltsuk potlatches were preferred to be done during the wintertime. The previous years' worth of food was in part to gather as much food for potlatch as possible. Potlatches are a way of holding society together and building alliances with leaders far afield, including those of other nations. Providing large amounts of food at potlatches demonstrates a Yimas' ability to provide for their House. Yimas use persuasion, moral authority and political skill to convince their House members to contribute to their potlatch. Commoners, in turn, receive goods during the Potlatch for their contributions.

=== Parallel governance with Canada ===
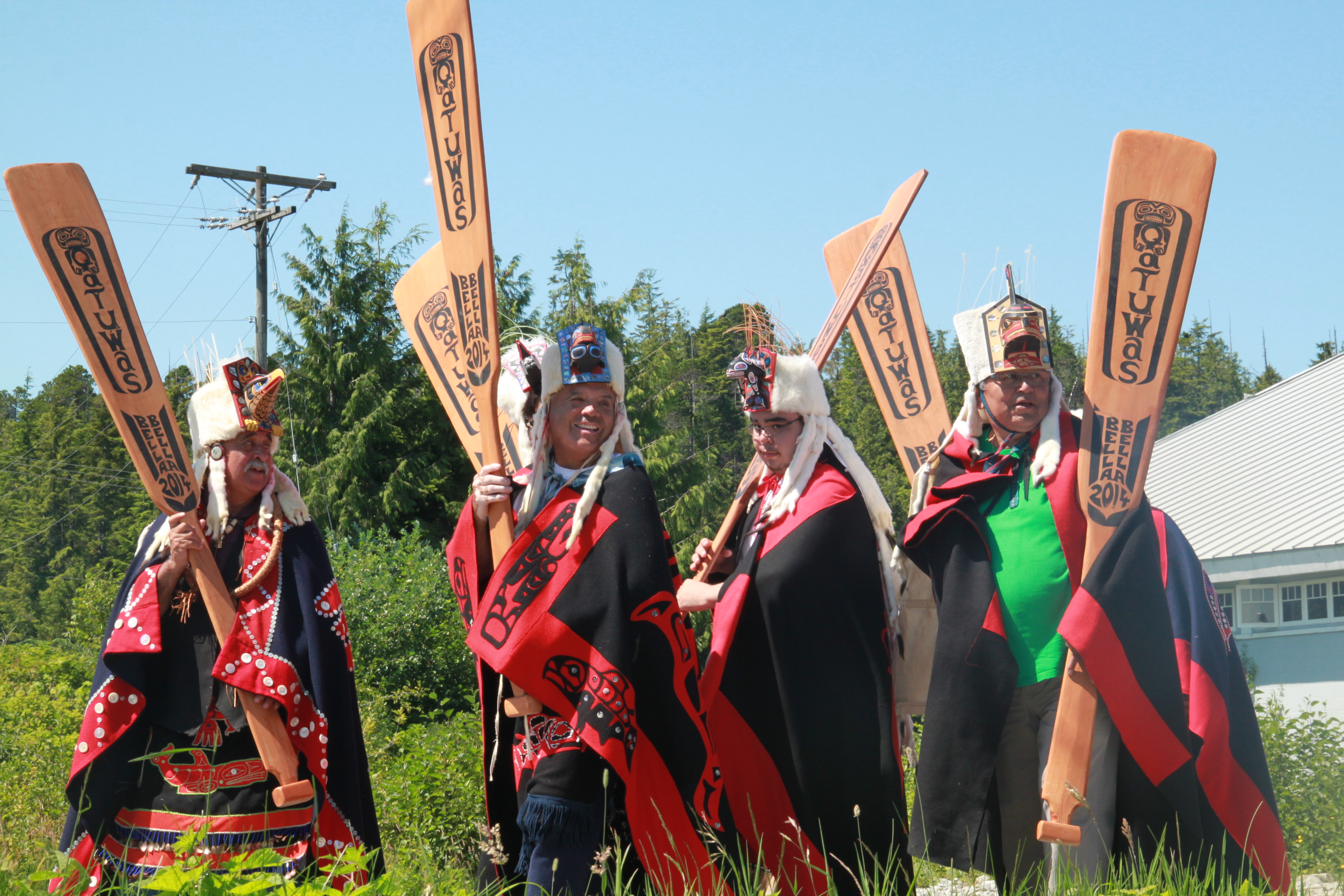
Picture of Heiltsuk Yimas

Due to overlapping legal jurisdictions between Canada and the Heiltsuk in Waxvwuisaxv, where neither party recognizes the sovereignty of the other, there has been a complex legal borderland where both systems interact since the mid 1800s. Reconciliation through treaty negotiation was attempted from 1993 to 2001 but was dropped by the Heiltsuk. To allow the Heiltsuk to embody and act on Gvilas, the Heiltsuk often participate in and collaborate with Canadian bureaucracy, courts, science, law and management processes to ensure that Gvilas can be de facto enacted even if not de jure recognized by Canada. Forms of co-management have become more common and are considered an improvement. However, it's still criticized for making Indigenous nations change their sociopolitical structures, concepts and language to accommodate the Canadian or British Columbian governments just to work with them.

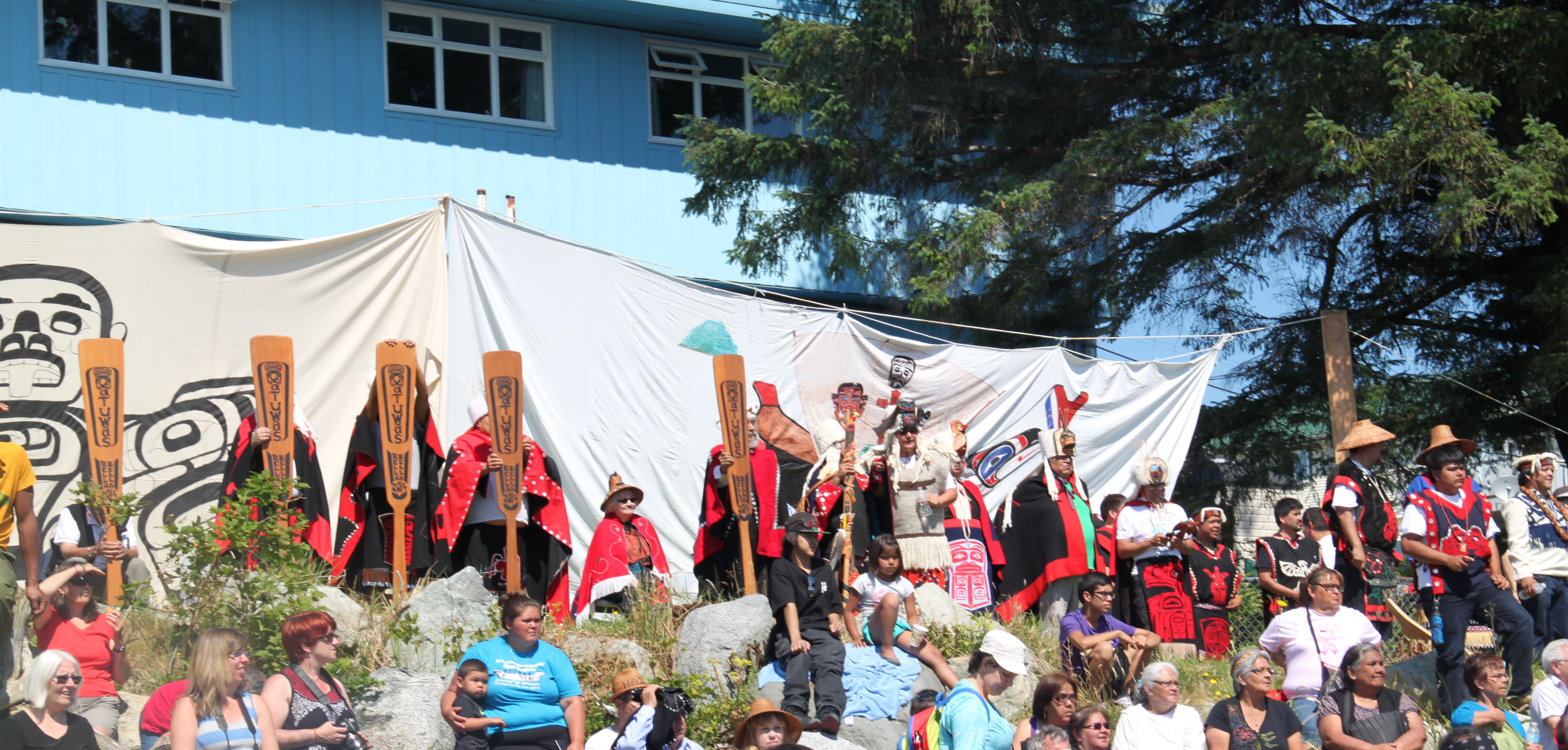
Picture of Heiltsuk Yimas and other Heiltsuk citizens at Bella Bella

In the 1990s and 2000s, Yimas attempted to get elected to band council seats to prevent logging on their stewarded territory. At the same time, the Yímas and the band government expanded their cooperation. Authority to enact Gvilas for day-to-day issues is increasingly delegated to the band government, while broader issues are solved in close collaboration with the hereditary Yimas. This effectively creates two parallel yet cooperating Heiltsuk governments. One Heiltsuk described it as, "[Yimas] take that power and distribute it to...the Tribal Council [the band government legislature], telling the Tribal Council: even though you’re elected leaders and you are restricted in what you can do with your ties to the government and funding, you are getting delegated the authority to use our laws, our power, same time and same way as you’re using the power from [the Canadian government]."

=== Heiltsuk constitution ===
In 2025, the Heiltsuk adopted a written constitution to clarify their governance of Waxvwuisaxv to outsiders. The constitution passed with 67% of the vote and was ratified at a ceremonial feast on May 30th, following efforts that went back nearly twenty years. The constitution is a nonexhaustive guide to the Q̓áikasas Ǧvi̓ḷás (paramount Gvilas) of the Heiltsuk nation. It lists some of the paramount rights, freedoms and responsibilities for various groups within the Heiltsuk nation alongside the Heiltsuk nation's own. It also has a detailed map of Waxvwuisaxv. Many of the Heiltsuk's neighbors objected to the Heiltsuk's territorial claims in their constitution and the Heiltsuk invited them to discuss the issue under traditional rules. The Heiltsuk constitution includes descriptions of various governing institutions such as:

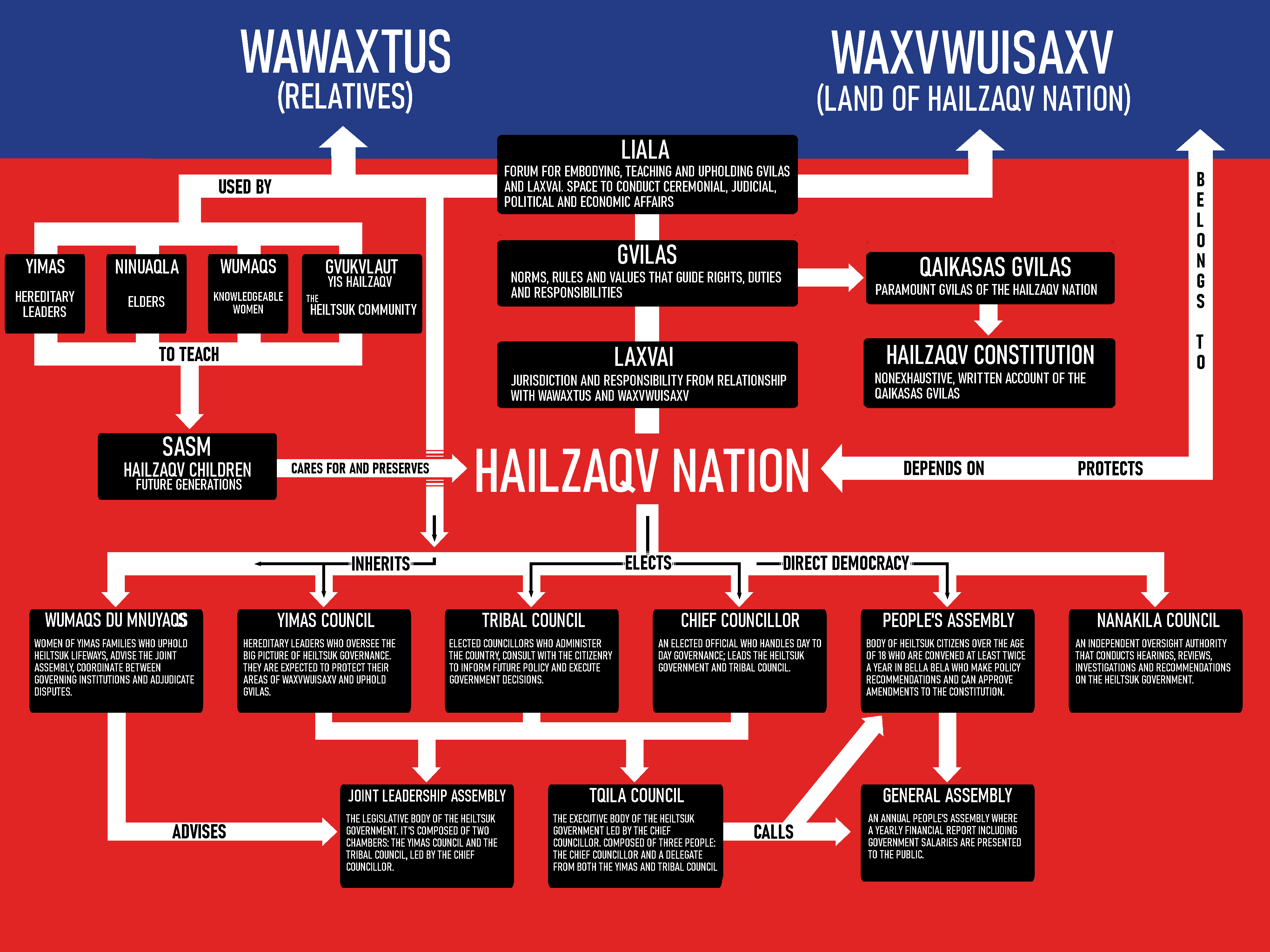
Infographic outlining some aspects of the Heiltsuk constitution.

- Yimas Council: A council that brings together the Yimas of the five Heiltsuk nations to make broader decisions for the nation.
- Tribal Council: A council of 12 (including the separately elected Chief Councillor) elected representatives.
- Chief Councillor: The elected chair of the Tqila Council, Joint Leadership Assembly and the Tribal Council.
- Joint Leadership Assembly: The main legislative body, composed of the Yimas Council and the Tribal Council.
- Tqila council: The main executive body, composed of a representative from both the Yimas and Tribal councils alongside the Chief Councillor.
- Wumaqs du Mnuyaqs: A council of women who are relatives to the current Yimas. They are responsible for holding Heiltsuk governance together and upholding Heiltsuk lifeways, especially for future generations.
- People's Assembly: An institution of direct democracy where Heiltsuk citizens are informed of government activities and get to respond to them.
- Nanakila Council: A council that oversees broader governance and resolves disputes. The council has the authority to conduct hearings and make binding decisions.

== History ==
The Heiltsuk say that their ancestors were placed in Waxvwuisaxv a long time ago by their creator before a great flood and that their oral tradition, responsibilities and sovereignty have been passed down since that time. The Heiltsuk are considered to have been cultural exporters historically, with many practices, such as the winter Hamaca ceremony, spreading outwards from them.

The Haida and Heiltsuk had long fought wars involving raiding for slaves. This continued until 1852, after which both parties potlatched together near McLoughlin Bay and made peace. The following period was marked by intermarriages and cooperation between the two nations. In 1884, colonial authorities banned the practice of the Potlatch across the Pacific Northwest. This began to force the Heiltsuk out of their Indigenous economy and subverted their ability to govern Waxvwuisaxv. In the 1890s, various Christian churches working with the Canadian state began settling up residential schools. Heiltsuk individuals were being sterilized up until 1951.

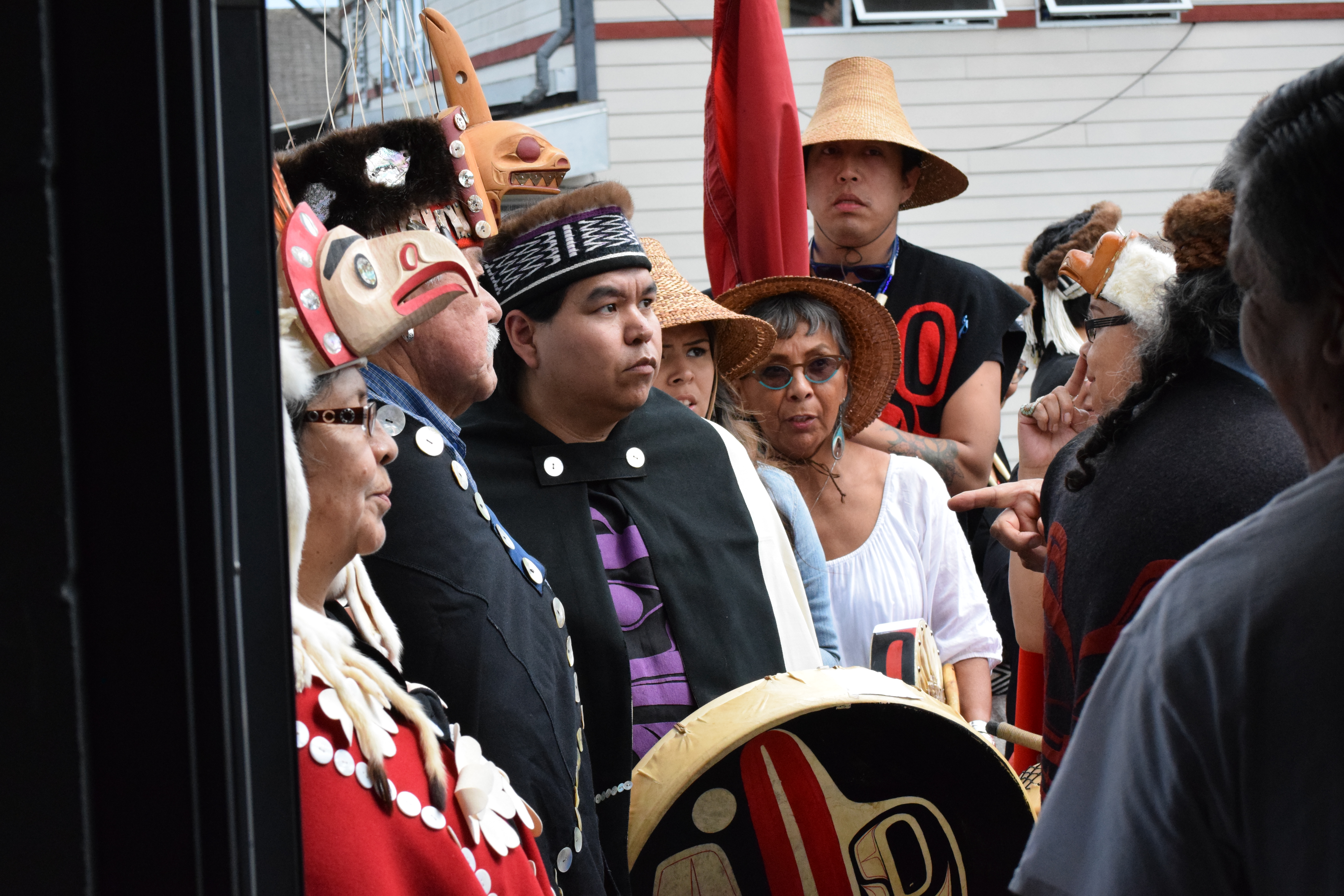
Haida delegates waiting to attend peace potlatch with the Heiltsuk.

=== 1951 to present ===
In 1996, local Haida leaders canoed to Waxvwuisaxv hoping to preempt issues arising from conflicting territorial claims between the two nations. In the 1996 court case, R v Gladstone, the Supreme Court of Canada recognized the Heiltsuk's already existing right to harvest and sell herring from the waters of Waxvwuisaxv after decades of Canadian attempts at restrictions that led to herring population declines, decay of traditional herring harvesting techniques and corporate lobbying. In the 90s the Heiltsuk also established the Heiltsuk Coastal Guardian Watchmen program to oversee private fishers operating in Waxvwuisaxv and this was later followed up by similar efforts such as the establishment of a patrol force to protect bears in the Great Bear Rainforest.

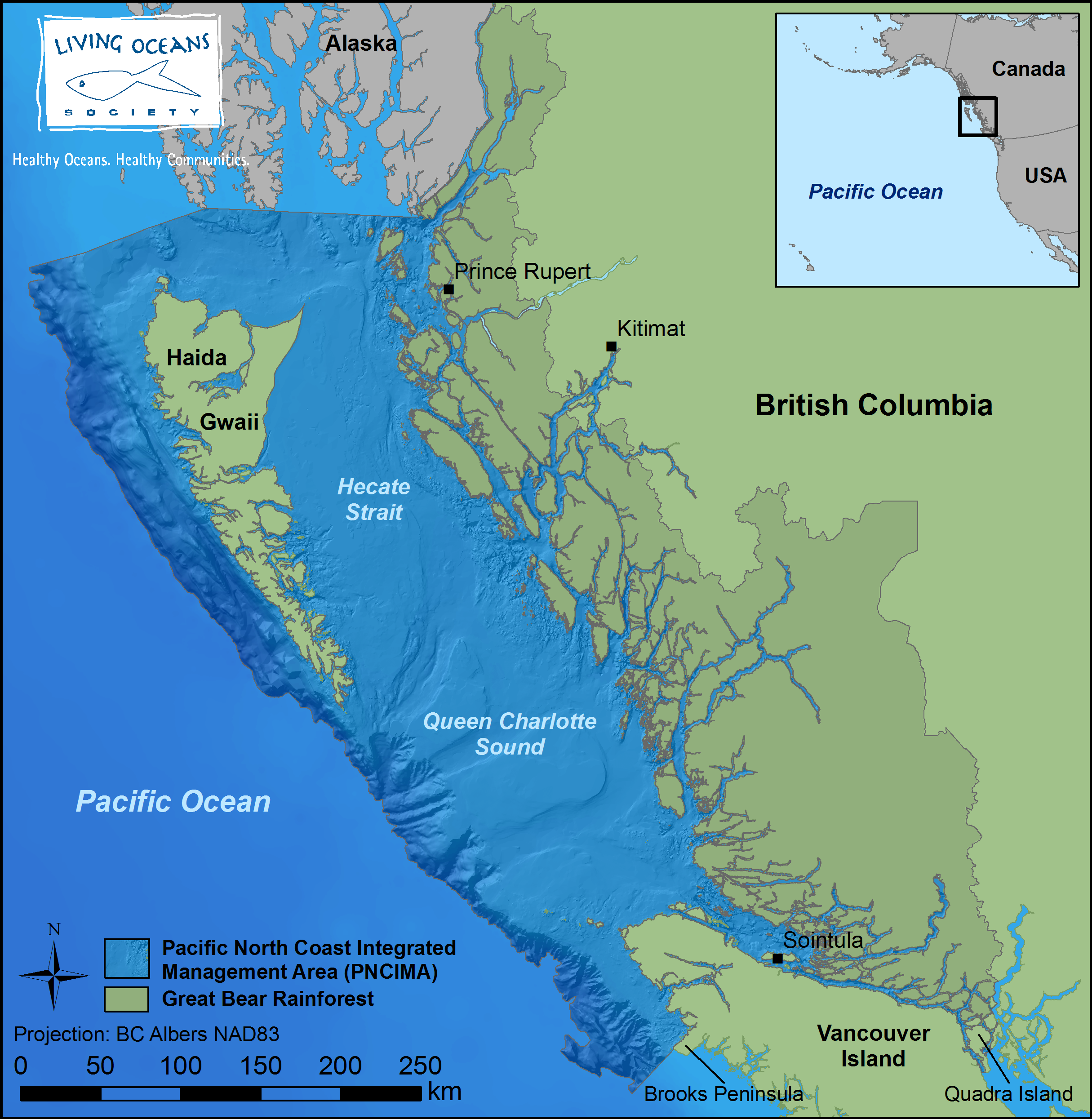
Map showing the management area for the Great Bear Rainforest

In the 90s, industrial logging in Waxvwuisaxv increased significantly. Conservation organizations (called ENGOs), who had been working to protect old growth forests further south, moved north. This became known as the War in the Woods. The Heiltsuk often hesitated to participate in attempts by ENGOs, Canada and British Columbia to manage the land because it might infringe on their sovereignty, economic development and harvesting rights. Instead Heiltsuk leaders, known as Yimas, staged various forms of protest, such as ceremony, cabin construction, mapping and other forms of opposition to logging (using methods such as clearcutting) while the band government was interested in the economic potential of more logging with companies such as MacMillan Bloedel. In 1997, on King Island, land ancestral to both the Nuxalk and the Heiltsuk, the Nuxalk and various environmental organizations staged a protest. The Heiltsuk Yimas, not having been consulted, came to the island and asked the protestors to leave. The protestors refused and were temporarily banned from the community.

In 2000, the Heiltsuk began coordinating with other countries owning land in the rainforest to resolve these issues, in an alliance called the Coastal First Nations. In 2001 and 2006, the Great Bear Rainforest was agreed to be co-managed by 8 governments that make up much of the rainforest's land area with cooperation from various environmental organizations. The Heiltsuk independently negotiate with businesses who want logging rights, outside of the institutions of British Columbia. In 2016, a new agreement was announced that would protect 85% of the Great Bear Rainforest from logging. This order also empowered the Heiltsuk to build a new big house, enabling them to hold potlatches in a big house for the first time in 120 years.

In 2013, a ban on hunting bears was unilaterally issued in Waxvwuisaxv by the Heiltsuk. Recreational trophy hunting had long been authorized under the laws of British Columbia but not the Indigenous laws of the Heiltsuk and their ecological goals under their Gvilas. The Heiltsuk were trying to expand and fund ecotourism to see the Kermode bears of Waxvwuisaxv but this was often subverted by settlers' trophy hunting on their territory which was scaring customers. The Heiltsuk cooperated with settler allies to buy up hunting licenses to enforce the ban. British Columbia followed suit by issuing their own ban in 2017.

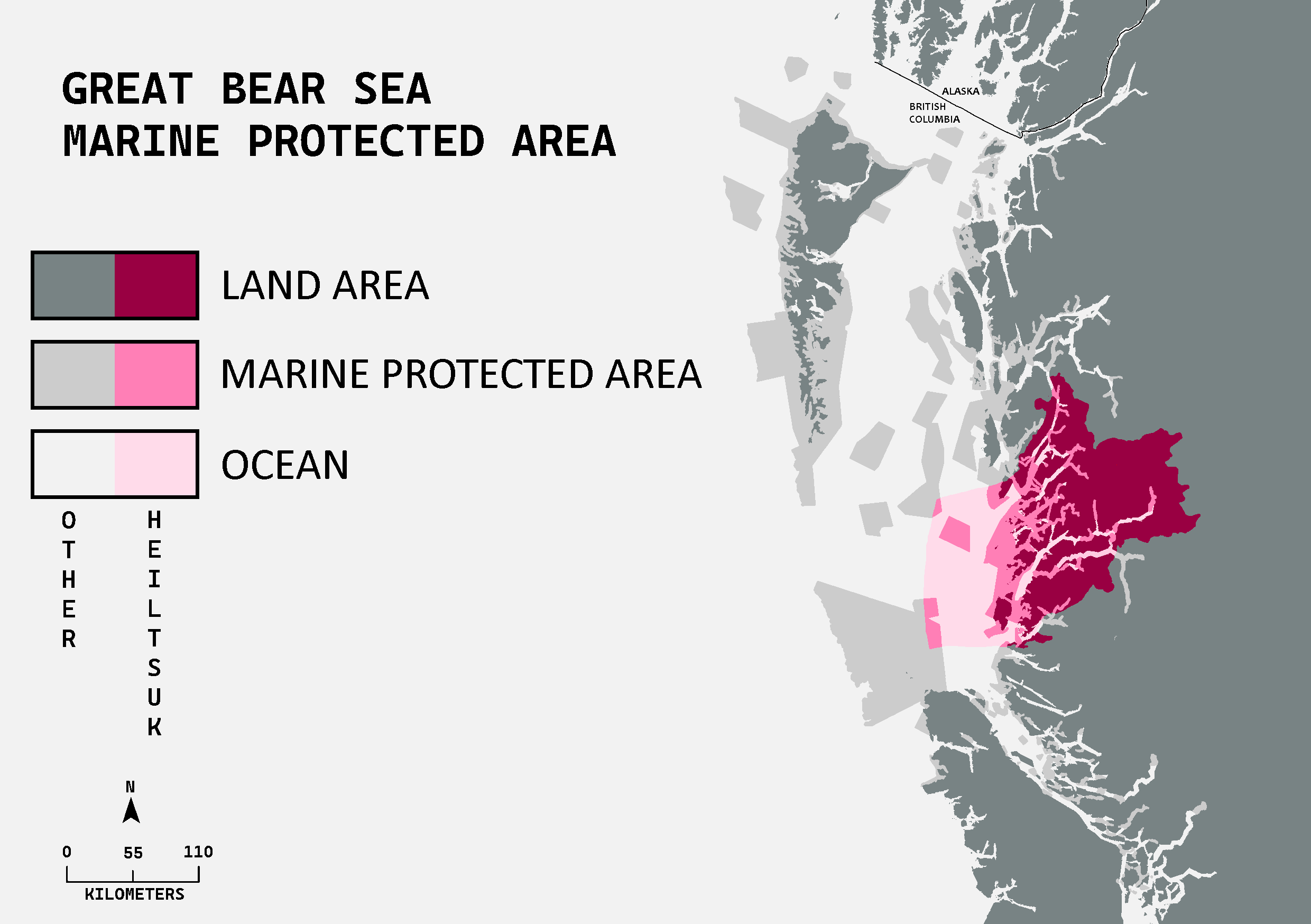
Map of the Great Bear Sea Marine Protected Area and Waxvwuisaxv.

From 2004 to 2014, the herring populations of Waxvwuisaxv once again collapsed, leading to the Heiltsuk accusing the Canadian government of mismanagement and the Heiltsuk increasingly asserting their sovereignty to stop the decline. The Heiltsuk sponsored scientific research into the herring populations to corroborate their personal experiences such as seeing fewer and smaller herrings. In 2015, the Heiltsuk and Haida renewed their peace treaty from the 1850s. It concluded with a potlatch at Bella Bella Reservation. The two nations had long been cooperating to oppose pipelines, such as the Enbridge Northern Gateway Pipelines, and commercial fishing in their respective countries. Some leaders from other neighboring nations also attended and committed to working together to support the Heiltsuk against commercial herring fishers. Cooperation continues after the renewal.

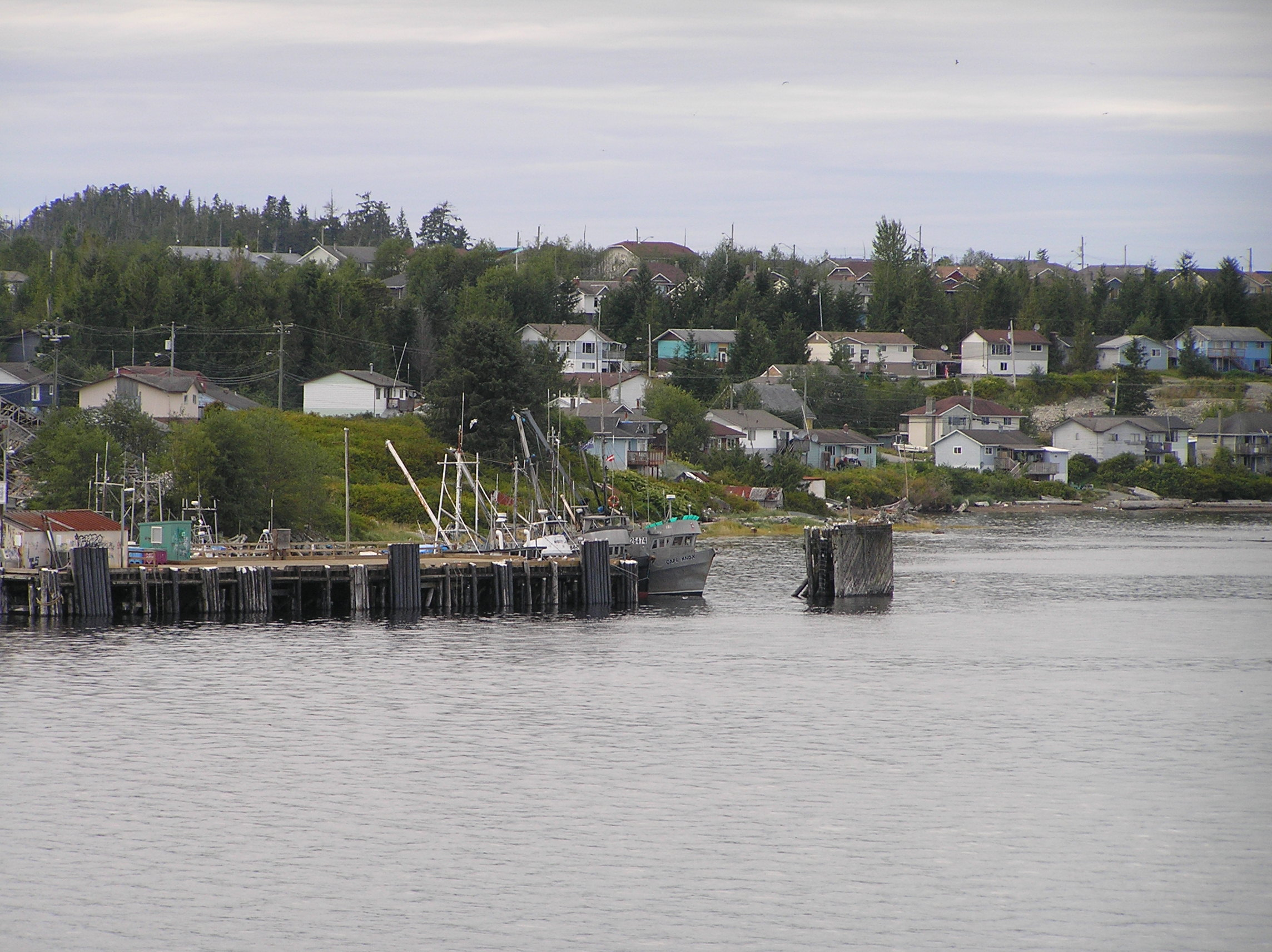
Picture of fishing boats and fishers at the Bella Bella reservation

In 2015, the Heiltsuk occupied multiple government buildings (such as those of Fisheries and Oceans Canada) responsible for managing fishing in Waxvwuisaxv and threatened them with an eviction notice, in what is termed the Herring Uprising. The regulators agreed to comanage fisheries with the Heiltsuk and to temporarily shut down commercial fishing in the area. Recently, the Heiltsuk and many of their neighbors have been cooperating to form the Great Bear Sea Marine Protected Area to ensure sustainable fishing for future generations. The Heiltsuk have had to keep their own fishery closed to protect herring populations.

The Heiltsuk were similarly facing a decline in crab (such as the Dungeness crab) populations from 2006 to 2015. While the Canadian government refused to look into the issue the Heiltsuk and allied nations funded research into the problem. They noticed problems with the commercial fishing techniques authoritized by Canadian law. They issued a ban on fishing at 50% of crab fishing sites while the others remained open. A significant increase in the size and population of crabs was found to be a consequence of this ban.

In 2016, an oil boat ran aground near a Heiltsuk community. The crash released over 110,000 litres of diesel fuel and lubricant oils into the waters of Waxvwuisaxv. This also polluted a Heiltsuk clam fishery in the area. The Heiltsuk conducted their own investigation on the oil spill. In response to their findings, they formed the Dáduqvlá Committee to adjudicate the Gvilas violations by the vessel owner and set out what the compensation should be. The committee's decision requires "...the owner of the vessel to participate in several ceremonies with us as an apology, and to provide funding for ecological and cultural assessments and restoration. Canada must agree to reconciliation protocols, fund the marine response center, and create space for independent Heiltsuk jurisdiction to bring into effect the Heiltsuk Marine Use Plan." The Heiltsuk are not only pursuing compensation for economic losses but also cultural losses.

== See also ==
- Eeyou Istchee
- Haudenosaunee Confederacy
- Mikmaki
- Nitaskinan
- Nitassinan
- Pimicikamak
- Three Fires Confederacy
- Wabanaki Confederacy
