= 128th meridian west =

Line of longitude

128th meridian west

The meridian 128° west of Greenwich is a line of longitude that extends from the North Pole across the Arctic Ocean, North America, the Pacific Ocean, the Southern Ocean, and Antarctica to the South Pole.

The 128th meridian west forms a great circle with the 52nd meridian east.

== From Pole to Pole ==
Starting at the North Pole and heading south to the South Pole, the 128th meridian west passes through:

Co-ordinates	Country, territory or sea	Notes
90°0′N 128°0′W	Arctic Ocean	
75°34′N 128°0′W	Beaufort Sea	Passing just east of the Baillie Islands, Northwest Territories, Canada (at 70°35′N 128°5′W)
70°34′N 128°0′W	Canada	Northwest Territories; Yukon — from 61°42′N 128°0′W; British Columbia — from 60°0′N 128°0′W, the mainland, Cunningham Island, Denny Island and Hunter Island
51°54′N 128°0′W	Fitz Hugh Sound	
51°44′N 128°0′W	Canada	British Columbia — Hecate Island and Calvert Island
51°28′N 128°0′W	Pacific Ocean	Queen Charlotte Sound
50°51′N 128°0′W	Canada	British Columbia — Vancouver Island
50°28′N 128°0′W	Pacific Ocean	Passing just east of Henderson Island, Pitcairn Islands (at 24°24′S 128°17′W)
60°0′S 128°0′W	Southern Ocean	
74°12′S 128°0′W	Antarctica	Unclaimed territory

== See also ==
- 127th meridian west
- 129th meridian west
