= Queens Sound =

Coordinates: 51°56′00″N 128°21′00″W

Queens Sound is a sound on the Central Coast of British Columbia, Canada, located between Hunter Island (W) and the Goose Group islands (W). Cultus Sound is to the south, and Kildidt Sound to the south of that.
