= 53rd meridian =

53rd meridian may refer to:

- 53rd meridian east, a line of longitude east of the Greenwich Meridian
- 53rd meridian west, a line of longitude west of the Greenwich Meridian

53rd meridian west	53rd meridian east
