= 127th meridian =

127th meridian may refer to:

- 127th meridian east, a line of longitude east of the Greenwich Meridian
- 127th meridian west, a line of longitude west of the Greenwich Meridian

127th meridian west	127th meridian east
