= Hakai Lúxvbálís Conservancy =

Conservancy in British Columbia, Canada

- IUCN category II (national park)
- Location within British Columbia
- Location: Central Coast, British Columbia, Canada
- Nearest city: Bella Bella
- Coordinates: 51°49′14″N 128°10′48″W
- Area: 122,998 ha (474.90 sq mi)
- Designation: Conservancy
- Established: 2008
- Governing body: BC Parks

The Hakai Lúxvbálís Conservancy is a conservancy in British Columbia, Canada. It covers both land and sea, within the Hecate Lowland ecosection, including the southern part of Hunter Island and Goose Island at the north end, and part of Calvert Island at its south end, bordering the Calvert Island Conservancy. It is approximately 20 kilometres south of Bella Bella. Established in 2008, the conservancy covers 122,998 hectares of land (51,914 hectares of upland and 69,137 hectares of foreshore). The conservancy is managed co-operatively under an agreement between the Heiltsuk Nation (Haíłzaqv) and British Columbia for conservation and recreation, with access and resources available to the Heiltsuk Nation in accordance with their aboriginal rights.

== See also ==
- Heiltsuk Nation
- Hakai Institute
