= Kildidt Sound =

Coordinates: 51°50′00″N 128°09′00″W

Kildidt Sound is a sound on the Central Coast of British Columbia, Canada, located on the southwest side of Hunter Island. Cultus Sound is to the north, and Queens Sound north of that.

The name Kildidt comes from the Heiltsuk language, meaning "long inlet" or "long way inland."
