= 54th meridian =

54th meridian may refer to:

- 54th meridian east, a line of longitude east of the Greenwich Meridian
- 54th meridian west, a line of longitude west of the Greenwich Meridian

54th meridian west	54th meridian east
