= 2005–06 South-West Indian Ocean cyclone season =

Cyclone season in the Southwest Indian Ocean

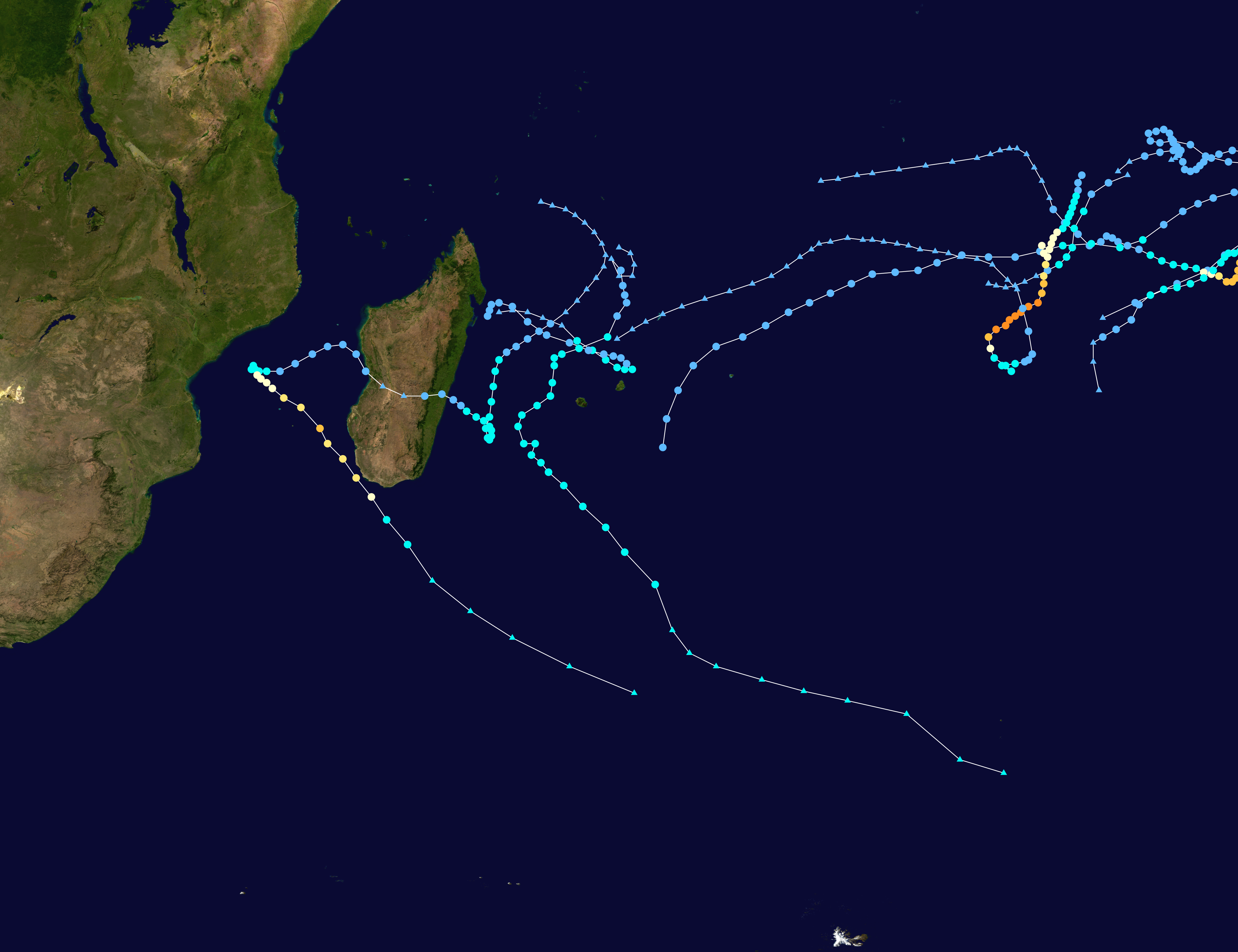
- Season summary map

Seasonal boundaries
- First system formed: September 5, 2005
- Last system dissipated: April 17, 2006

Strongest storm
- Name: Carina
  - Maximum winds: 205 km/h (125 mph) (10-minute sustained)
  - Lowest pressure: 915 hPa (mbar)

Seasonal statistics
- Total disturbances: 13
- Total depressions: 10
- Total storms: 6
- Tropical cyclones: 3
- Intense tropical cyclones: 2
- Total fatalities: At least 42 total
- Total damage: Unknown

Related articles
- 2005–06 Australian region cyclone season; 2005–06 South Pacific cyclone season

The 2005–06 South-West Indian Ocean cyclone season was the fifth least-active on record. The Météo-France office on the island of Réunion tracked 13 tropical disturbances, of which six intensified into a moderate tropical storm. Three of these systems proceeded to attain tropical cyclone status – reaching 10 minute maximum sustained winds of at least 120 km/h (75 mph). The American-based Joint Typhoon Warning Center also tracked eight storms in the basin. Activity was below normal due to a powerful Walker circulation, which increased convection over the neighboring Australian basin, but suppressed activity in the western Indian Ocean. As a result, most of the storms developed near or entered from the Australian basin, crossing 90°E to enter the South-West Indian Ocean.

A series of four short-lived systems occurred from September to November in the northeastern portion of the basin. These were followed by the first named storm – Alvin – which was renamed after it crossed from the Australian region as Tropical Cyclone Bertie in late November. After another short-lived disturbance in late December, there was a tropical disturbance in the Mozambique Channel in January that killed 26 people when it brought heavy rainfall to Mozambique. Later in the month, Tropical Cyclone Boloetse took an erratic track across Madagascar, killing six people when it brushed the island's southwest coast. In February, there was a small, short-lived unnamed tropical storm that presented difficulties to warning agencies in determining its structure. Intense Tropical Cyclone Carina was the strongest system of the season, attaining peak 10 minute winds of 205 km/h (127 mph) in the open waters of the eastern portion of the basin. Sprawling Tropical Storm Diwa brought six months' worth of rainfall to the drought-ridden island of Réunion, reaching 2,943 mm (115.9 in) in the mountainous peaks. The rains led to flooding and landslides that killed 10 people directly or indirectly. Two of the deaths occurred when a saturated cliff collapsed onto a coastal road. The final storm, Elia, dissipated on April 17 after previously entering from the Australian basin.

== Seasonal summary ==
Météo-France's meteorological office in Réunion (MFR) – the official Regional Specialized Meteorological Center for the South-West Indian Ocean – tracked and named all tropical cyclones from the east coast of Africa to 90° E, and south of the equator. The Joint Typhoon Warning Center (JTWC), which is a joint United States Navy – United States Air Force task force that issues tropical cyclone warnings for the region, also issued advisories for storms during the season.

There were 13 tropical disturbances in the season that were monitored by the MFR. Since the agency began operations in the early 1990s, this season had the second-fewest disturbances that received warning, only behind the 2000–01 season. Since the advent of satellite imagery in 1967, this season was the fifth least-active in terms of storm days and the number of cyclones. There were six systems that attained the intensity of a moderate tropical storm, which has 10 minute sustained winds of at least 65 km/h (40 mph), below the average of nine. There were 30 days in which a moderate tropical storm was active, less than the average of 48. Three tropical storms attained tropical cyclone status, or 10 minute winds of at least 120 km/h (75 mph), and there were 10 days in which these systems were active; this is half the average of 20 days, continuing the trend since the 2000–01 season of fewer stronger systems. The season was very similar to the 1998–99 season; both had late starts for the first named storm, drought conditions over much of the basin, and low activity. The third named storm, Carina, did not occur until late February, which at the time was the latest such date since naming began in 1960.

In general, storms in the season formed in the basin's periphery or north of the Mascarene Islands. No systems developed in the Mozambique Channel, an unusual occurrence. The overall lack of activity was due to a strong Walker circulation over Indonesia, which increased convection over the Australian region, but suppressed convection over the Indian Ocean. The Intertropical Convergence Zone – typically a major contributor to tropical cyclogenesis – was rarely active. Conditions became generally more favorable in February and March, when four of the six tropical storms occurred. The general lack of thunderstorms over the basin caused drought-like conditions. Pierrefonds Airport on Réunion recorded just 18 mm (0.71 in) of rainfall from November to January, a record minimum. The island also recorded its third-highest average atmospheric pressure from November to April.

== Systems ==
=== Tropical Disturbance 01 ===
- Tropical disturbance (MFR)
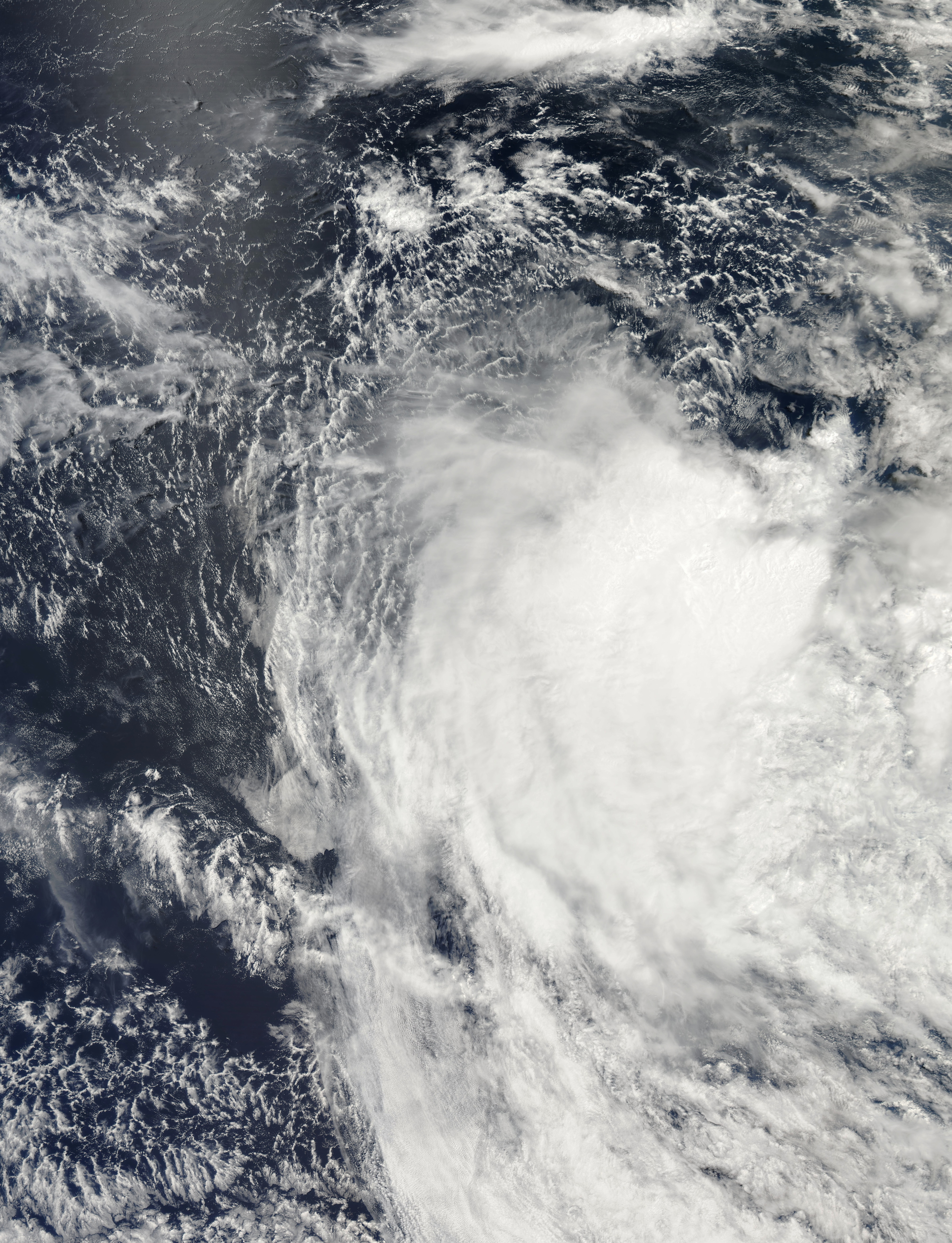
- Duration: September 5 – September 8
- Peak intensity: 45 km/h (30 mph) (10-min); 1001 hPa (mbar)

At the beginning of September 2005, the ITCZ was active in the northeastern portion of the basin, accompanied by a small circulation and scattered convection. Located in the presence of strong wind shear, the circulation was exposed from the convection, a sign of unfavorable conditions. However, warm waters fueled an increase in convection, and the MFR classified the system as Tropical Disturbance 1 on September 5. That day, the JTWC issued a TCFA, but continued shear caused weakening as the disturbance tracked southeastward. By September 8, the MFR had discontinued advisories on the system, after the circulation had become exposed. After turning to the west-northwest, the circulation began dissipating on September 12.

=== Tropical Depression 02 ===
- Tropical depression (MFR)
- Tropical storm (SSHWS)
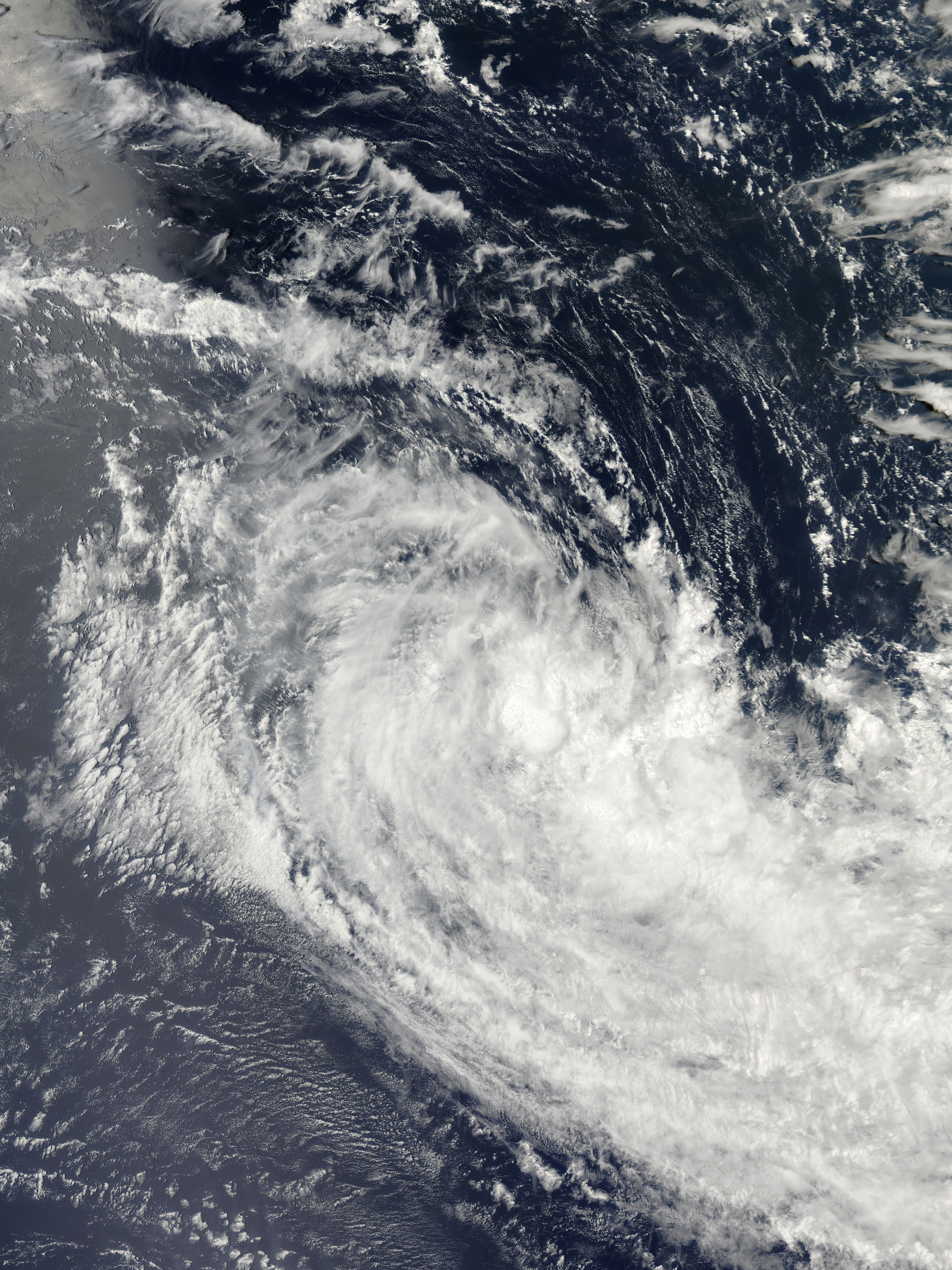
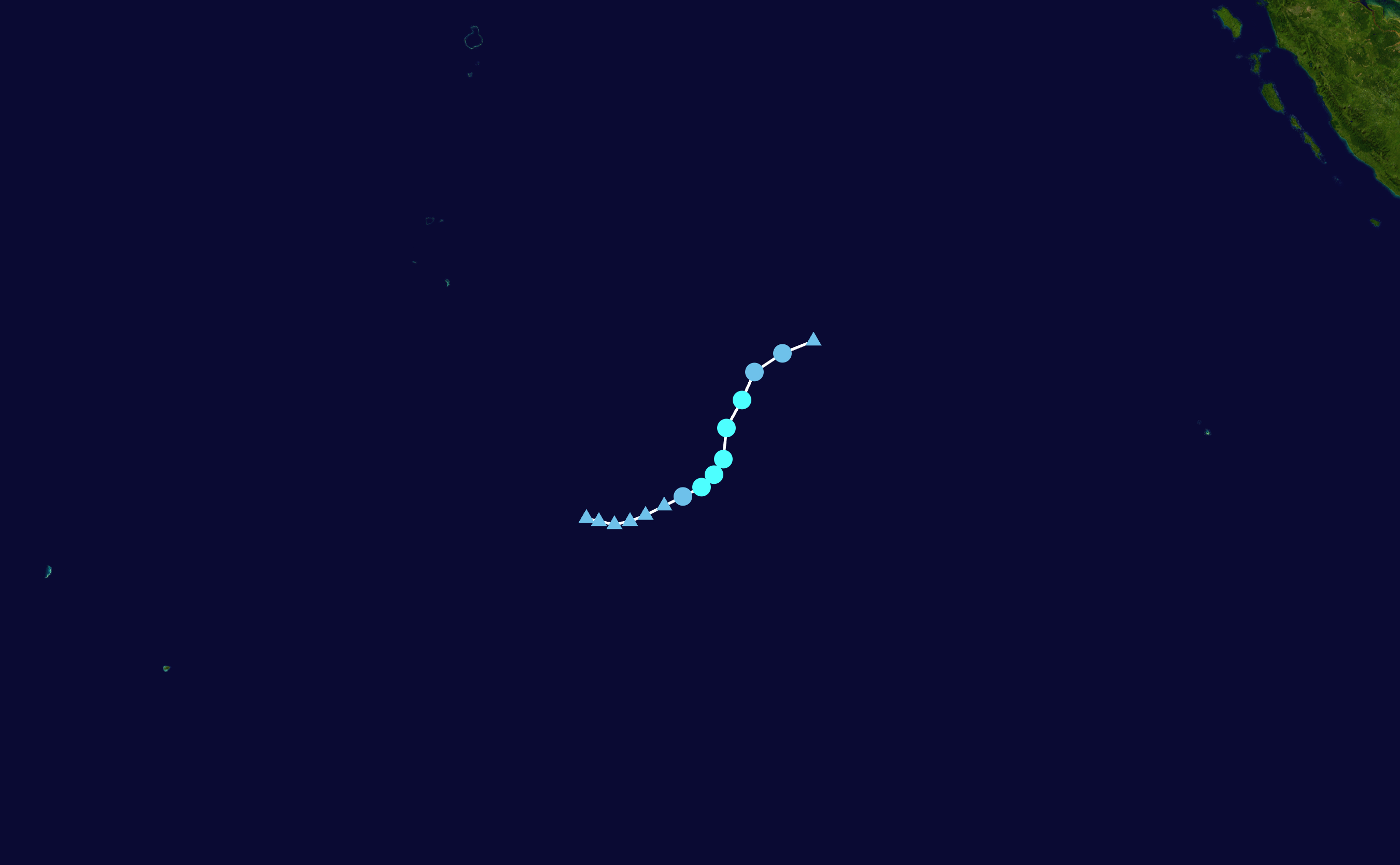
- Duration: October 12 – October 15
- Peak intensity: 55 km/h (35 mph) (10-min); 997 hPa (mbar)

The second disturbance was first classified by the MFR on October 12 about 1,575 km (979 mi) east of Diego Garcia. The system had enough of a circulation and associated convection, and proceeded southwestward for its duration. After the convection consolidated more and developed curved rainbands, the MFR upgraded the system to a 55 km/h (34 mph) tropical depression on October 14. This period of organization occurred during a brief decrease in wind shear. At 12:00 UTC on October 14, the JTWC classified the system as Tropical Cyclone 01S, estimating peak 1 minute winds of 75 km/h (47 mph). Increasingly unfavorable conditions caused the convection to diminish. Late on October 15, both the JTWC and MFR discontinued advisories due to the increasing disorganization of the disturbance. The circulation remained well-organized but devoid of convection, and the MFR last monitored the center on October 21.

=== Tropical Depression 03 ===
- Tropical depression (MFR)
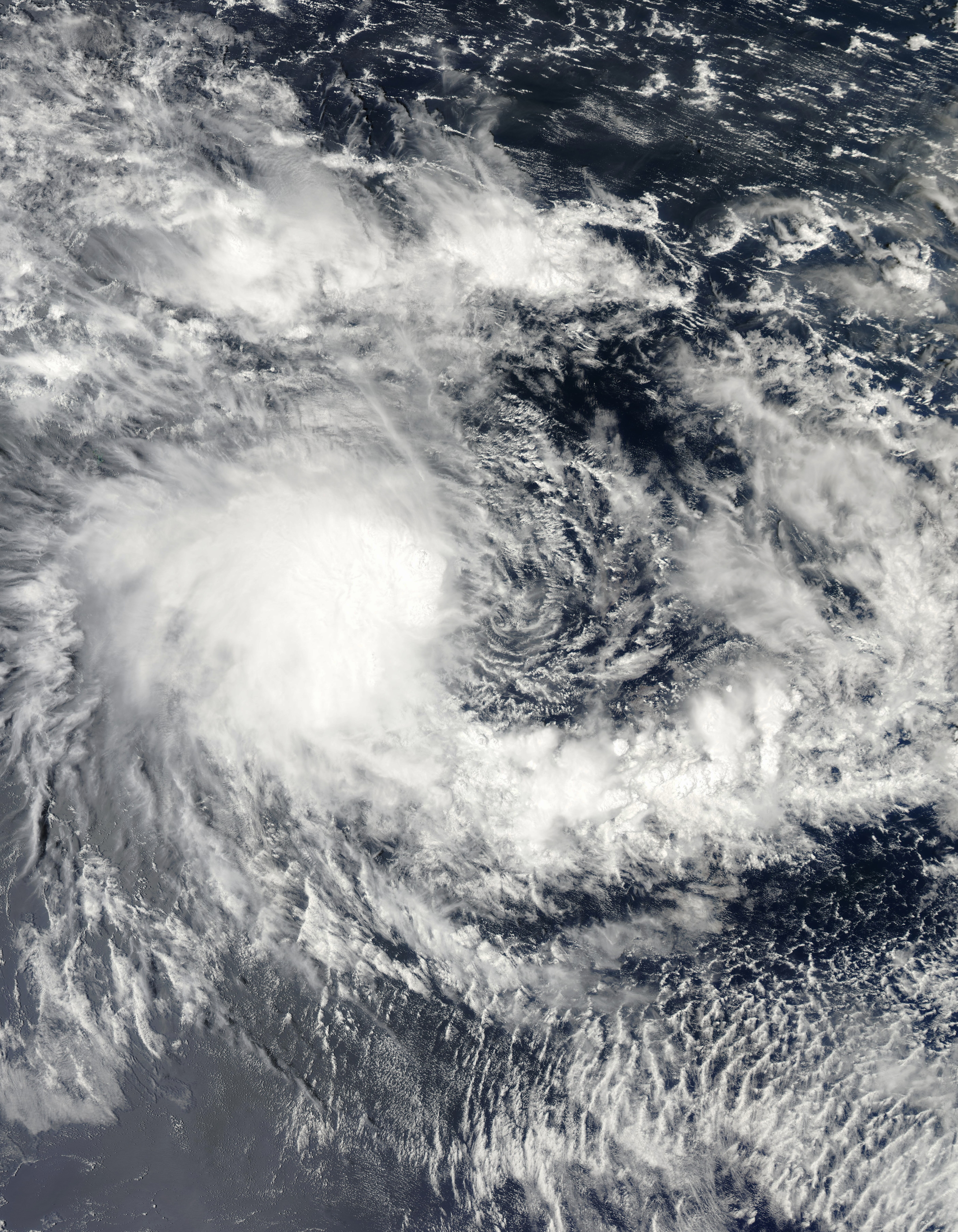
- Duration: November 6 – November 8
- Peak intensity: 55 km/h (35 mph) (10-min); 998 hPa (mbar)

Tropical Depression Three formed on November 6 while east-southeast of Diego Garcia; it moved generally southward, reaching peak winds of 55 km/h (34 mph) before dissipating on November 8.

=== Tropical Depression 04 ===
- Tropical depression (MFR)
- Tropical depression (SSHWS)
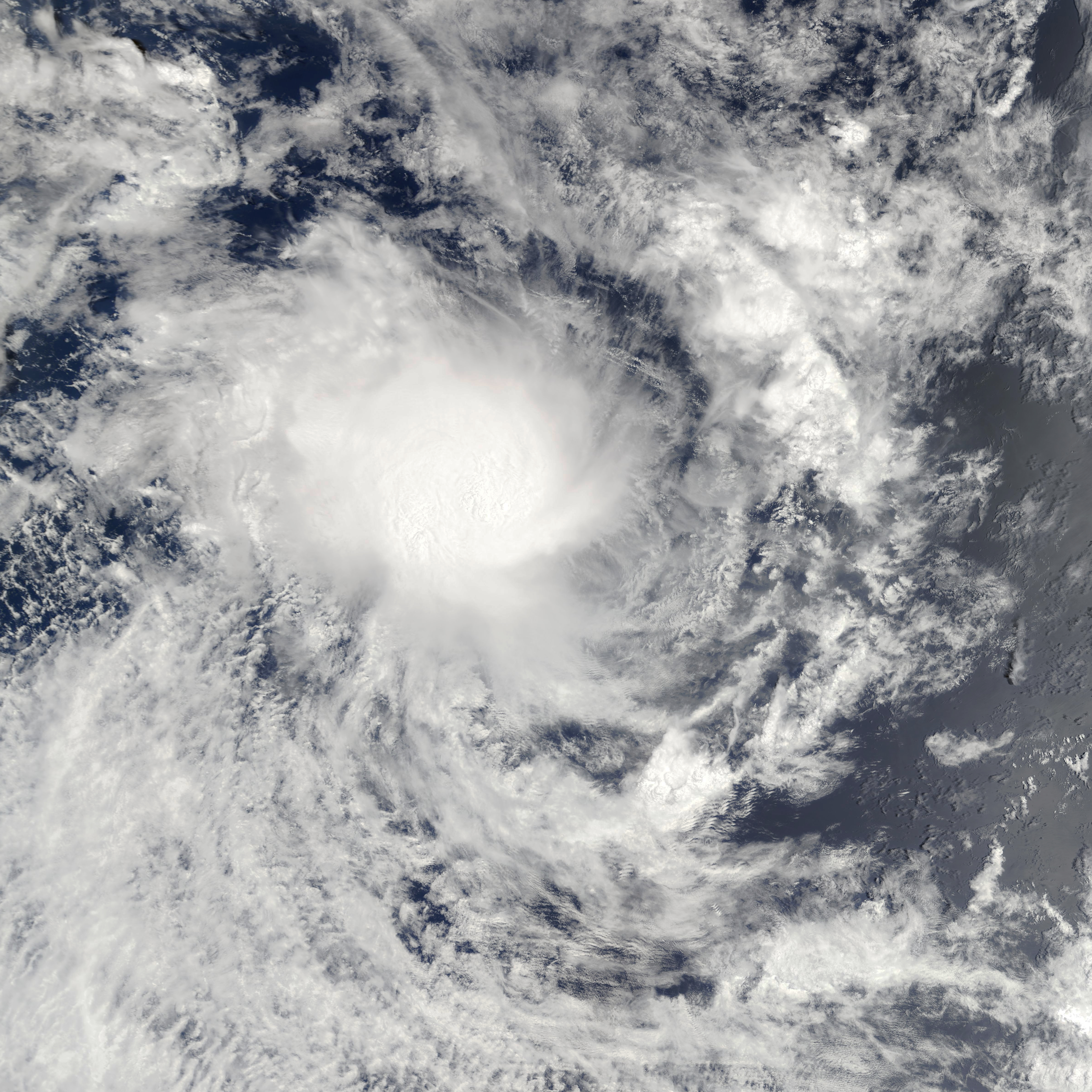
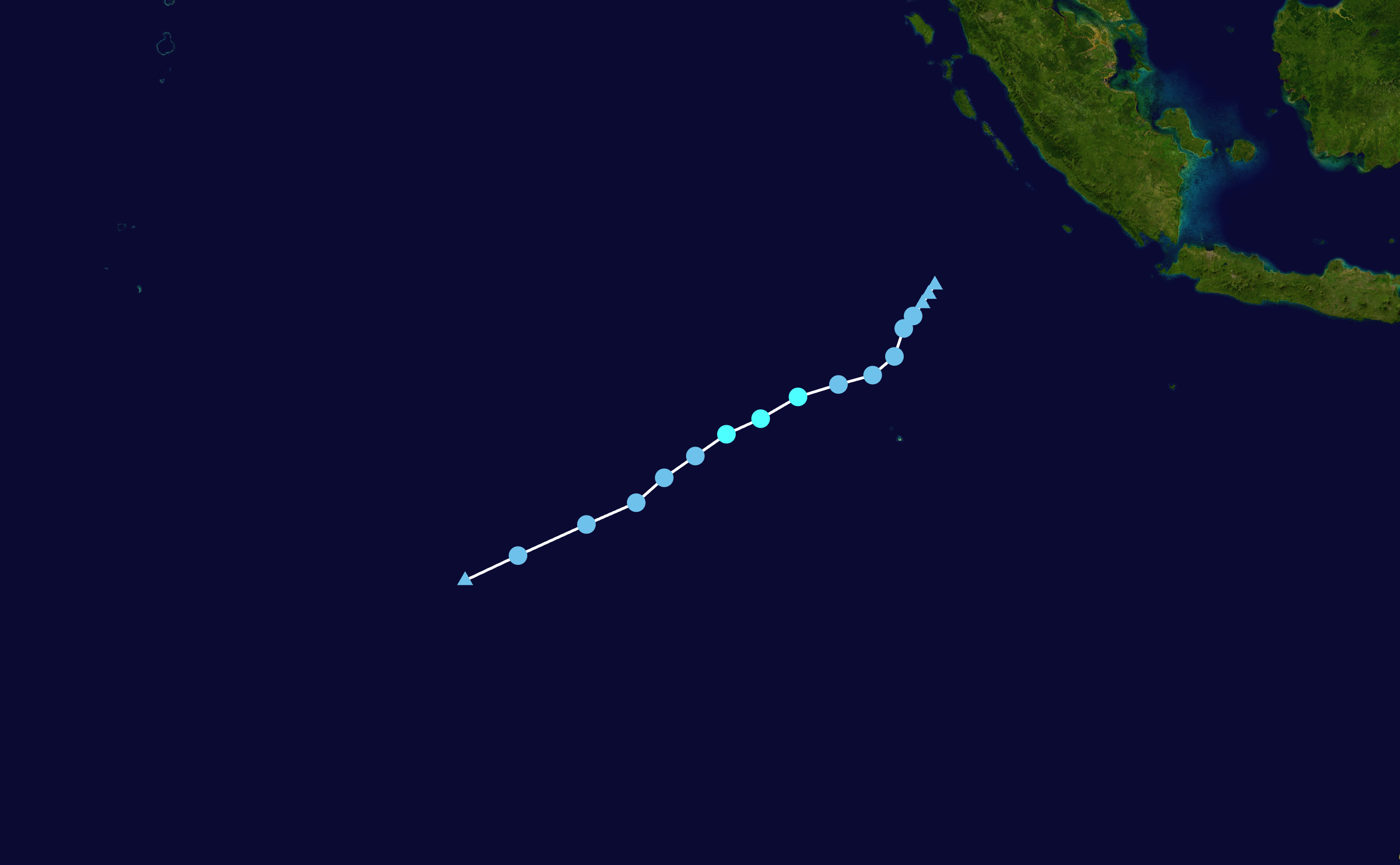
- Duration: November 6 (Entered basin) – November 8
- Peak intensity: 55 km/h (35 mph) (10-min); 995 hPa (mbar)

Simultaneous to Tropical Depression Three was Tropical Depression Four, which entered the basin on November 7 from the Australian region, and was also classified by the JTWC as Tropical Cyclone 02S with winds of 65 km/h (40 mph). The depression was weakening at the time, and both the JTWC and MFR discontinued advisories on November 8.

=== Intense Tropical Cyclone Bertie–Alvin ===
- Intense tropical cyclone (MFR)
- Category 3 tropical cyclone (SSHWS)
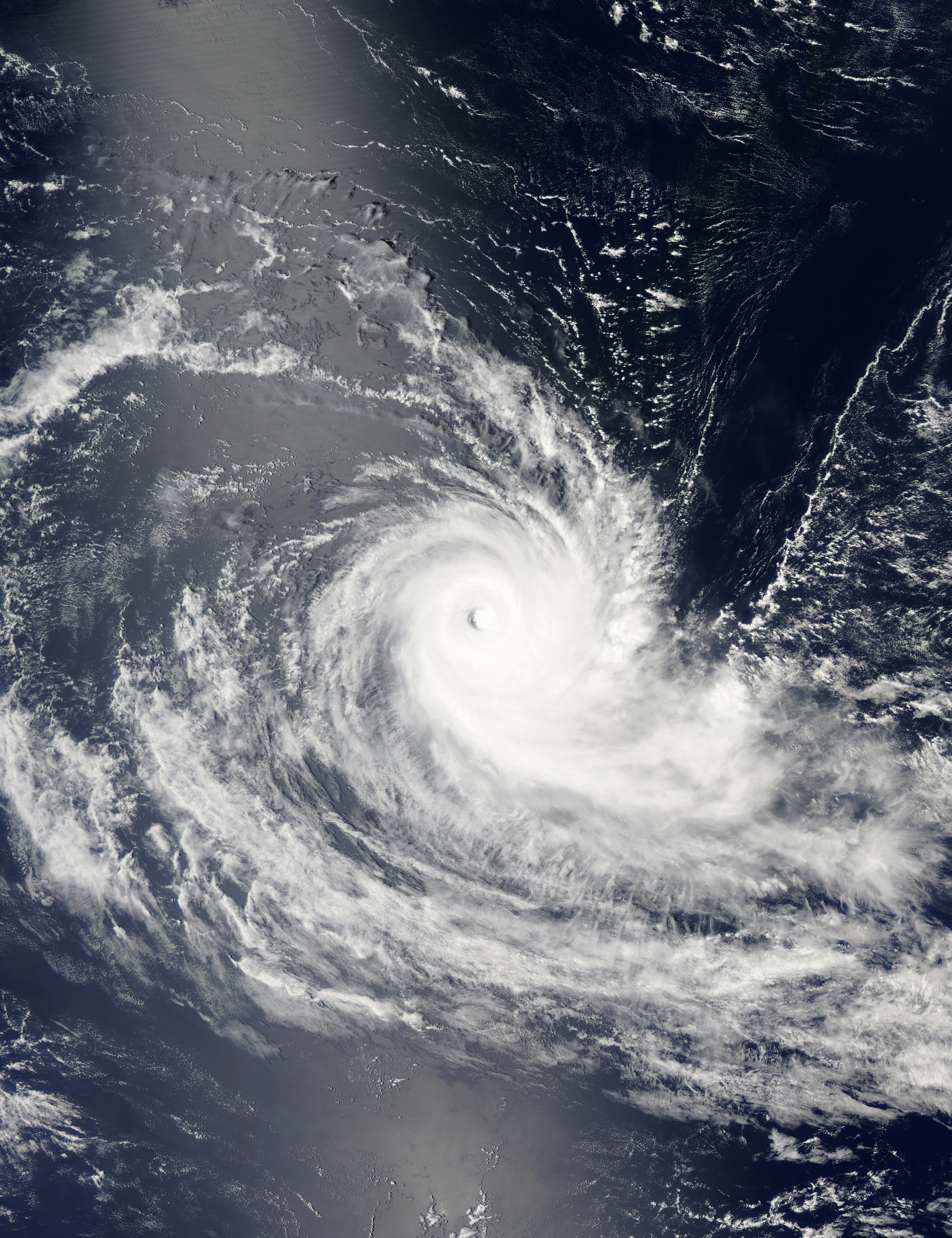
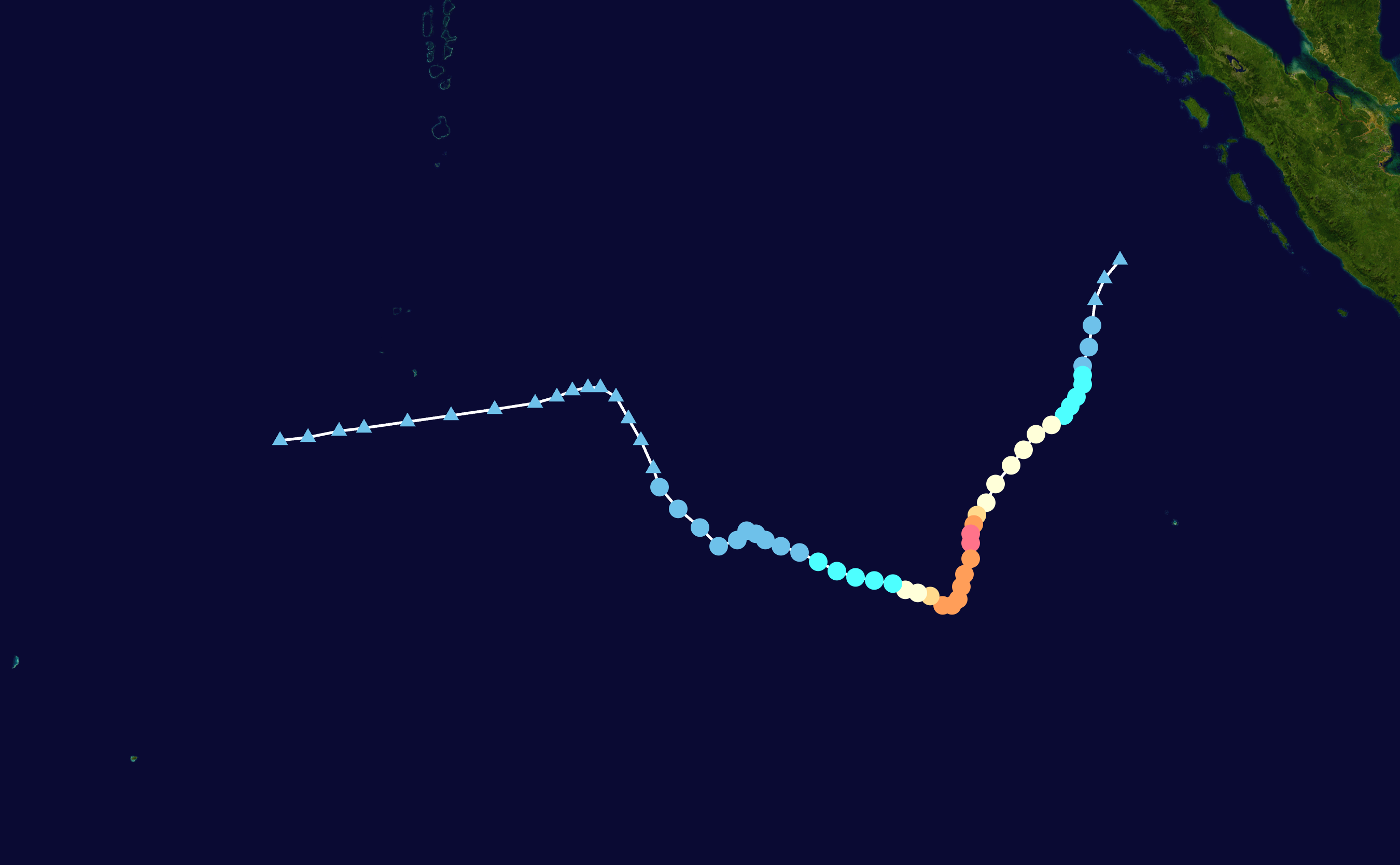
- Duration: November 24 (entered basin) – December 3
- Peak intensity: 175 km/h (110 mph) (10-min); 930 hPa (mbar)

In the middle of November, a westerly wind burst produced an area of convection southwest of Sumatra, which spawned a circulation at 2º S on November 16. Two days later, the BoM classified the system as a tropical low to the north of the Cocos Islands. The low moved southwestward, quickly intensifying, prompting the BoM to name it Bertie. The storm moved southwestward and intensified due to favorable water temperatures and atmospheric conditions, reaching winds of 185 km/h (115 mph) on November 22 while just east of 90º E. The track shifted nearly due south, and the eye moved along the dividing line between the Australian and south-west Indian Ocean basins. Early on November 24, the cyclone crossed 90º E and was renamed Alvin; at the time, the system was beginning to weaken due to cooler waters from upwelling and increased wind shear.

The MFR estimated peak 10 minute winds of 175 km/h (109 mph) within the basin, making it an intense tropical cyclone; it was the third consecutive year in which there was a November storm of such intensity. The JTWC, which designated Alvin as Tropical Cyclone 03S, estimated 1 minute winds of 195 km/h (121 mph). A building ridge to the south turned the storm to the west-northwest. By November 25, the increased wind shear had exposed the circulation from the convection, indicative of rapid weakening, and on that day Alvin was downgraded below tropical cyclone status. On the next day, the storm weakened to tropical depression status after nearly all of the convection was gone, prompting the JTWC to cease issuing advisories. The residual circulation remained well-defined with only temporary increases in convection. The MFR stopped issuing warnings on December 3, after Alvin had passed south of Diego Garcia, although the circulation continued westward and was still visible north of Madagascar on December 10.

=== Tropical Depression 06 ===
- Tropical depression (MFR)
- Tropical storm (SSHWS)
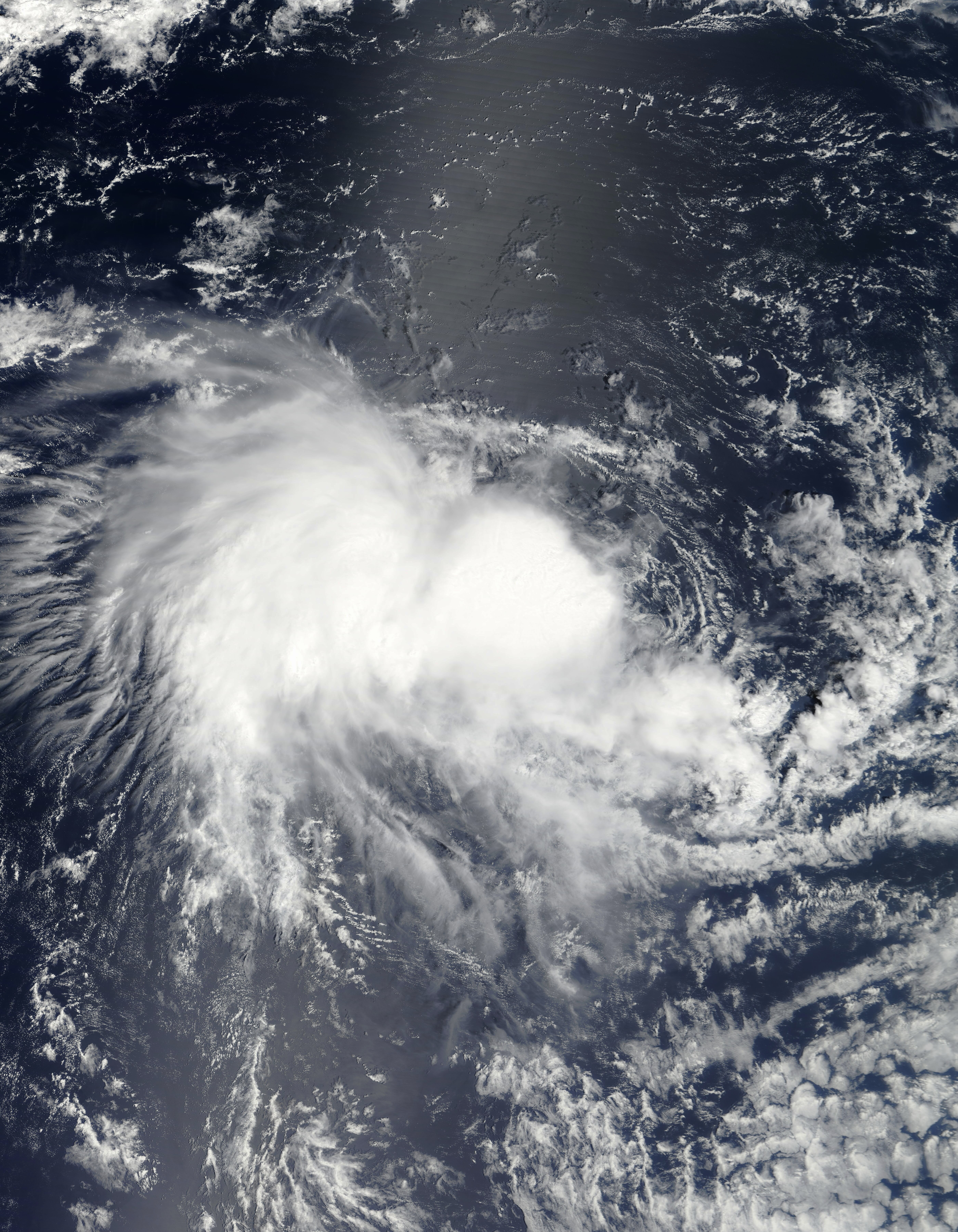
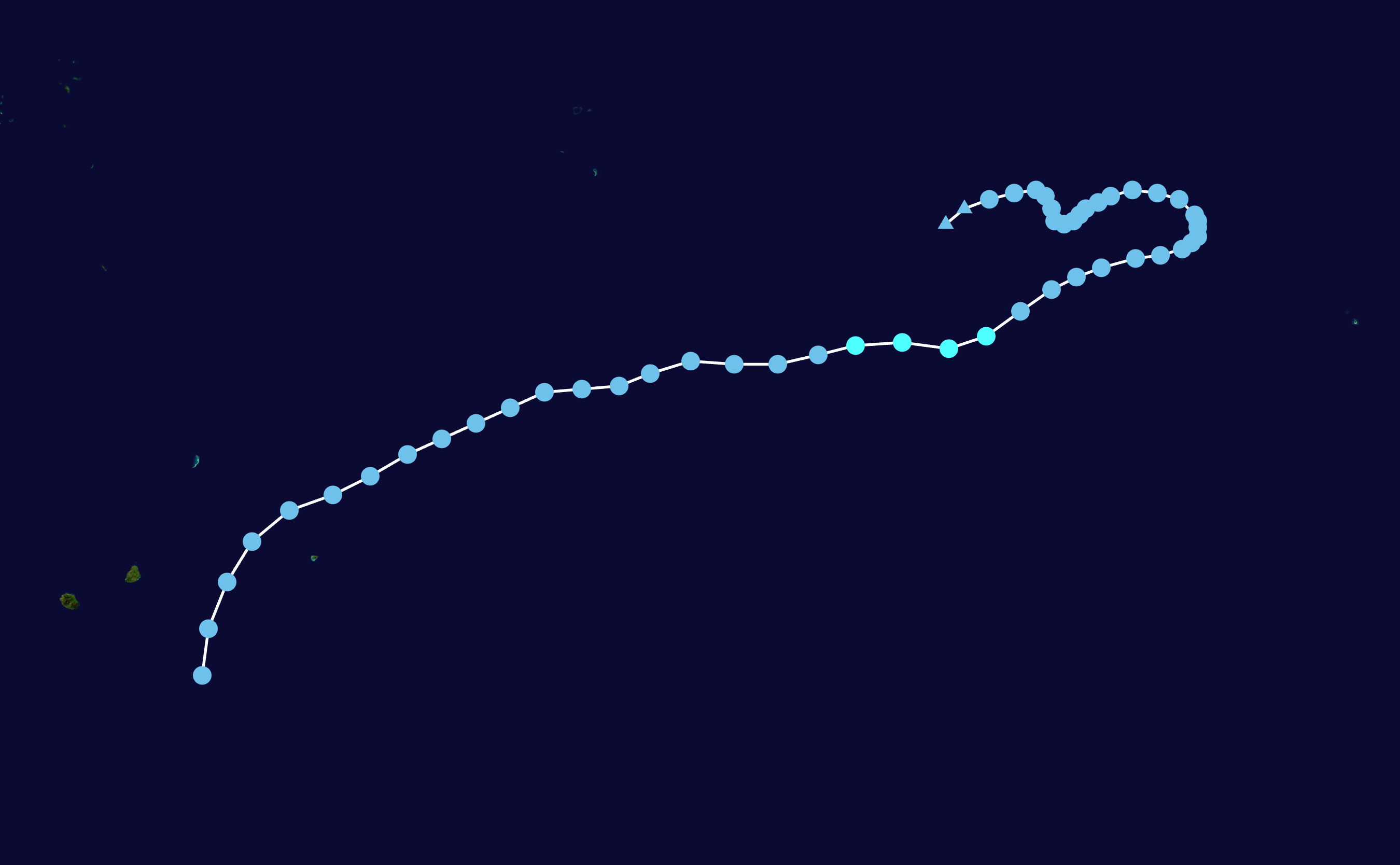
- Duration: December 23 (Entered basin) – December 29
- Peak intensity: 55 km/h (35 mph) (10-min); 998 hPa (mbar)

On December 21, the BoM began monitoring a tropical low in the western portion of the Australian basin, which had moved eastward from the south-west Indian Ocean basin. The system moved southwestward and later to the southwest, once again crossing 90º E and causing the MFR to designate it Tropical Depression 6. At the time, the circulation was partially exposed from the convection, although it organized over the next day. This spurred the JTWC to designate it as Tropical Cyclone 04S on December 24 with winds of 65 km/h (40 mph). As with other systems in the season, strong shear caused the system to weaken; the JTWC discontinued advisories on December 25, and the MFR followed suit the next day. However, the system continued to the southwest, reorganizing enough on December 27 for the MFR to reissue advisories. Shear again weakened the convection, and the MFR discontinued advisories again on December 29 while the system was a short distance west-northwest of Rodrigues.

=== Tropical Disturbance 07 ===
- Tropical disturbance (MFR)
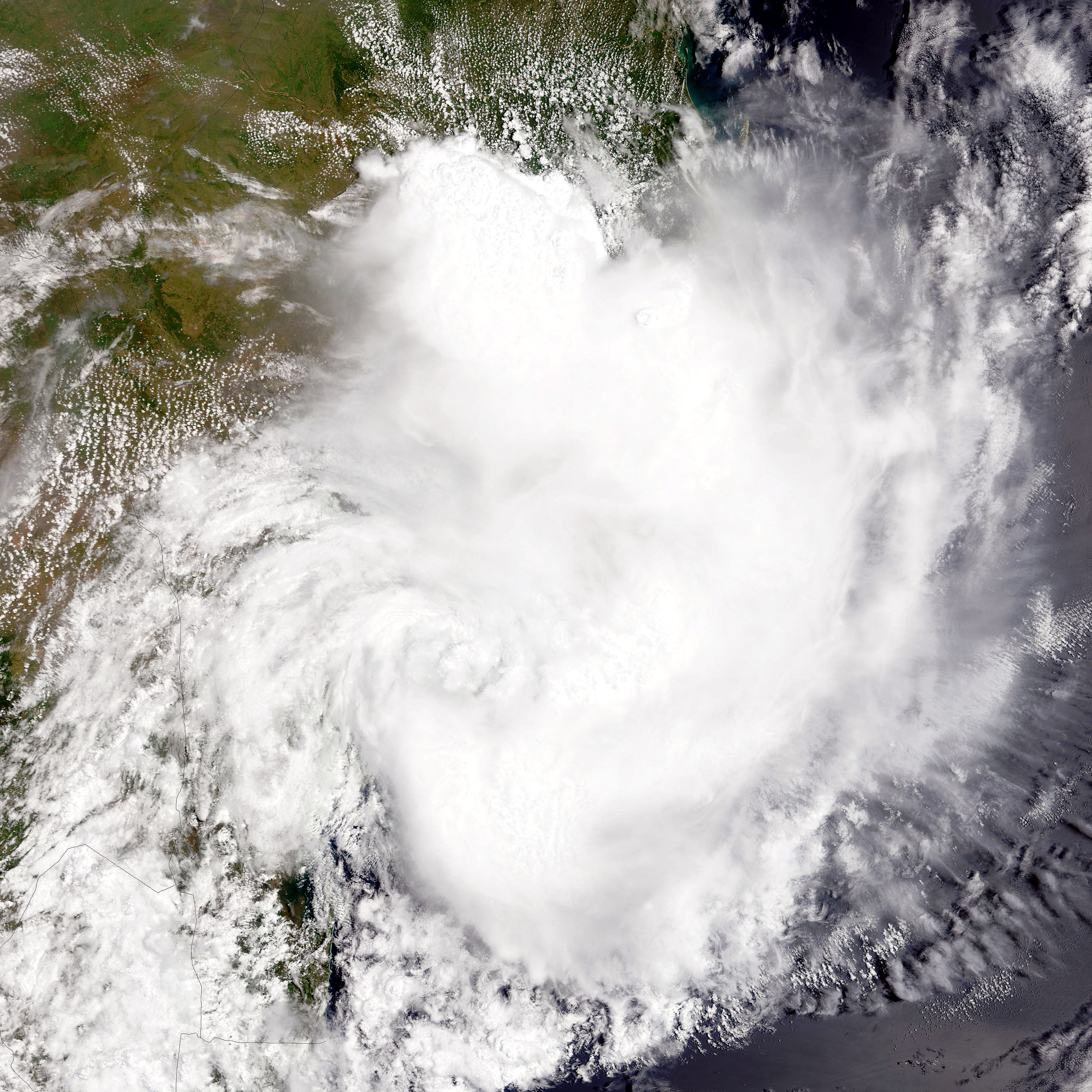
- Duration: January 3 – January 7
- Peak intensity: 45 km/h (30 mph) (10-min); 1002 hPa (mbar)

The Intertropical Convergence Zone (ITCZ) produced an area of convection northeast of Madagascar on December 29, which had an association circulation. On January 1, the system moved across northern Madagascar and subsequently entered the Mozambique Channel. It continued quickly to the southwest, passing north of Europa Island, and was classified as Tropical Disturbance 7 late on January 3. It continued intensifying and organizing until moving ashore Mozambique near Vilankulo, and the system nearly attained tropical depression stage. The system followed the country's coastline, bending southward toward the capital Maputo. On January 7, the disturbance moved offshore, but the system soon moved back overland and dissipated later that day over Swaziland. The system brought heavy rainfall to Inhambane Province, reaching 162 mm (6.4 in) in Inhambane. The rains resulted in flooding but also alleviated drought conditions in Mozambique. The rains also caused the Mutamba River to exceed its banks in Inhambane, flooding roads up to a meter (3.3 ft) deep and halting traffic. Across Mozambique, 26 people died due to the floods.

=== Tropical Cyclone Boloetse ===
- Tropical cyclone (MFR)
- Category 3 tropical cyclone (SSHWS)
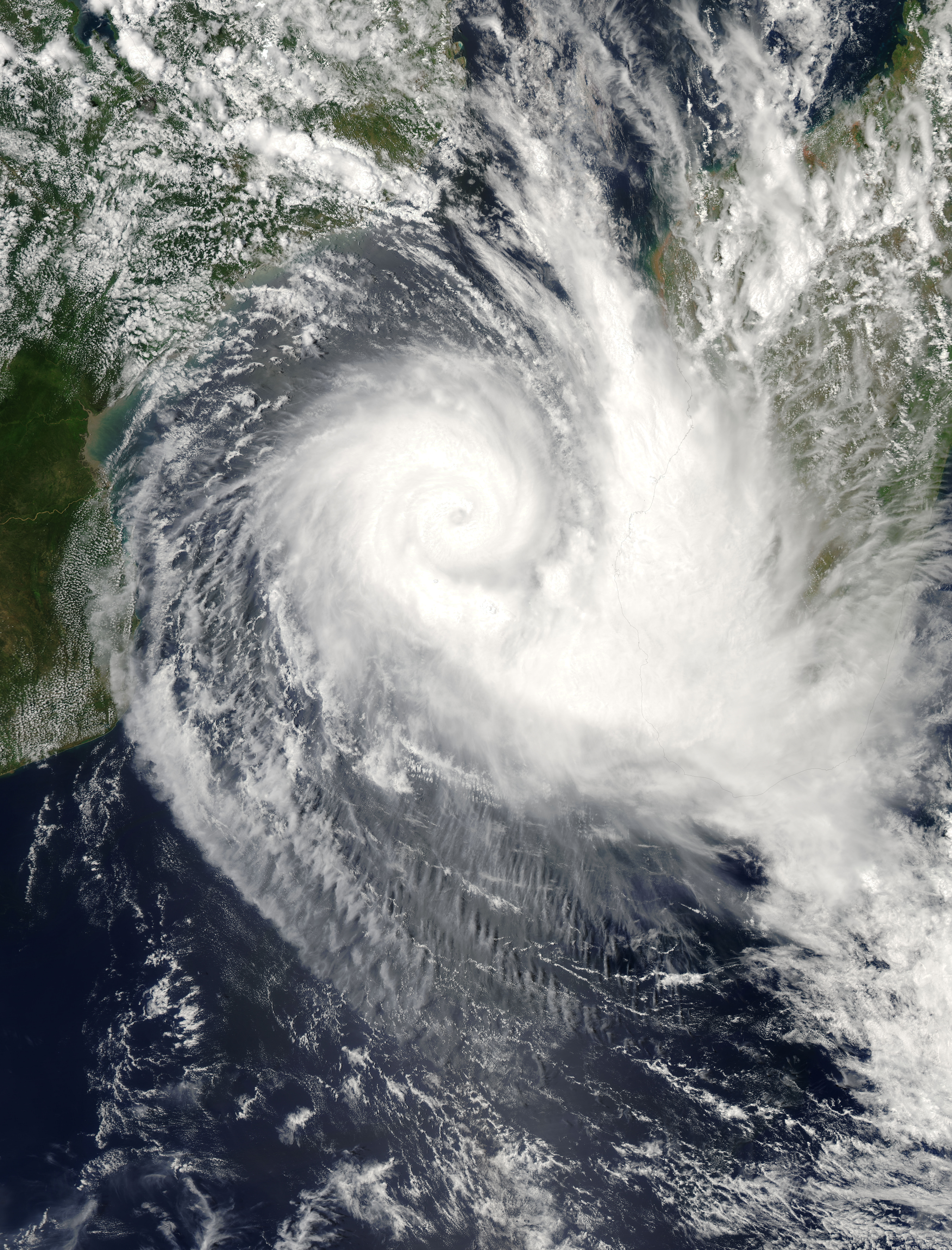
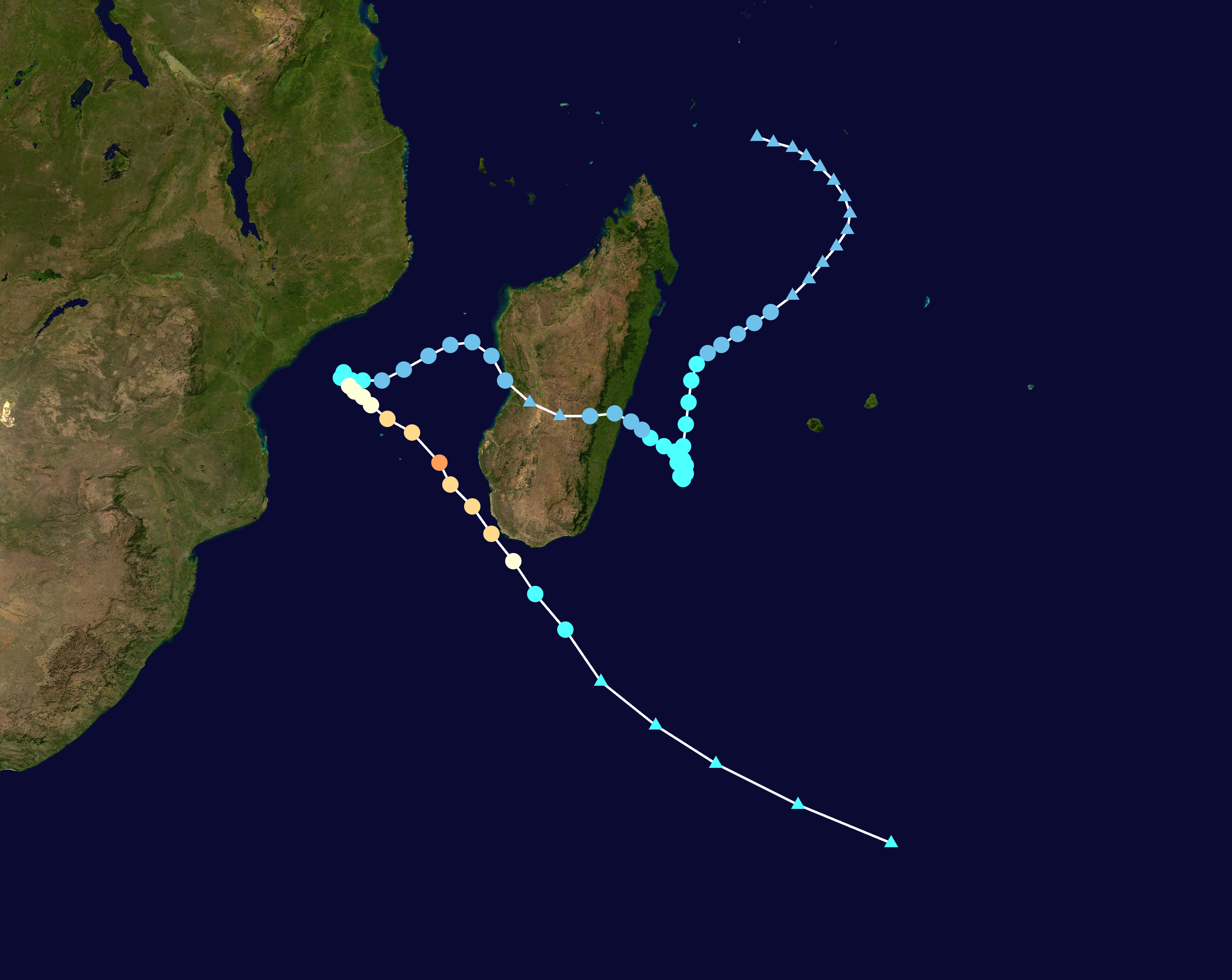
- Duration: January 20 – February 5
- Peak intensity: 155 km/h (100 mph) (10-min); 950 hPa (mbar)

A pulse in the monsoon spawned an area of convection from the Seychelles westward. A circulation was evident by January 20, signalling its formation as a tropical disturbance. Poor inflow from the trade winds prevented any initial organization as the system tracked southeastward. A ridge steered the disturbance to the southwest on January 23, bringing it just southeast of Tromelin Island. With light wind shear, the system developed a small area of convection over a well-defined circulation. Early on January 25, the MFR upgraded the disturbance to a tropical depression, and the JTWC classified it as Tropical Cyclone 09S. Later that day, the MFR upgraded it to a moderate tropical storm, giving it the name Boloetse. After a brief period of strengthening, the storm weakened due to increased shear and diurnal cooling. The track shifted to the south-southwest, paralleling Madagascar to the east. Steered between ridges to the east and west, Boloetse stalled and turned to the west-northwest. Late on January 27, the MFR downgraded the storm to a tropical depression, and late the next day, the circulation struck eastern Madagascar just north of Mananjary. The circulation had been weak during the approach to land, although there was a large increase in convection at the time of landfall.

The circulation became difficult to locate over land, and the JTWC briefly halted issuing advisories on January 29. On the next day, the circulation emerged westward into the Mozambique Channel, where low wind shear and good outflow allowed for restrengthening. By late on January 31, the system had reorganized into a moderate tropical storm. On the next day, the JTWC reissued advisories on Boloetse as the storm was just 170 km (110 mi) east of the Mozambique coast. Weak steering from the ridge to the southeast caused the storm to meander in the area of favorable conditions. By late on February 2, Boloetse attain tropical cyclone status, developing an eye in the center of the organizing convection. An approaching trough caused the storm to accelerate southeastward, bringing it northeast of Europa Island. Late on February 3, the JTWC estimated peak 1 minute winds of 185 km/h (115 mph), while the MFR estimated 10 minute winds of 155 km/h (96 mph). An eyewall replacement cycle and increased wind shear caused Boloetse to weaken, and on February 4, the cyclone passed within 20 km (12 mi) of southwestern Madagascar. The storm accelerated and weakened, transitioning into an extratropical cyclone on February 5. The remnant system was absorbed by the approaching trough two days later.

Along much of its path, the storm dropped heavy rainfall. The formative stages of Boloetse spread rainfall to Mauritius, where Vacoas recorded 175 mm (6.9 in) of rainfall over 24 hours. In eastern Madagascar, the storm dropped 133 mm (5.2 in) in Mahanoro over 18 hours. The storm deluged coastal Mozambique with over 100 mm (3.9 in) of rainfall, causing river levels to increase in Inhambane Province. Europa Island recorded 136 mm (5.4 in) of rainfall over just six hours. The cyclone still maintained much of its intensity during its final approach to southwestern Madagascar, bringing estimated wind gusts of 200 km/h (120 mph) to the coast. Toliara recorded wind gusts of 145 km/h (90 mph). In addition, heavy rainfall flooded two villages. Boloetse killed six people across southern Madagascar, while leaving 6,500 people homeless.

=== Severe Tropical Storm 09 ===
- Severe tropical storm (MFR)
- Tropical storm (SSHWS)
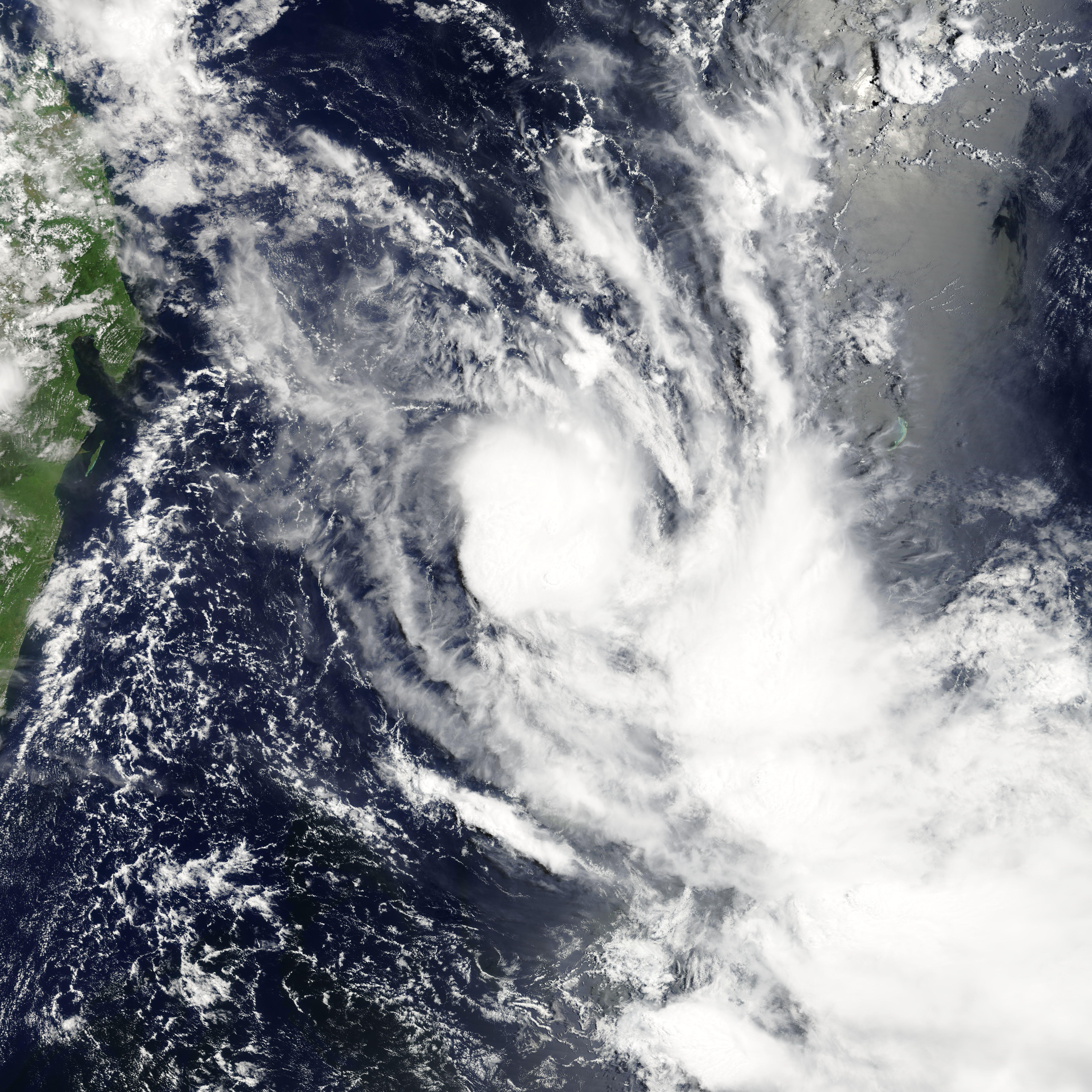
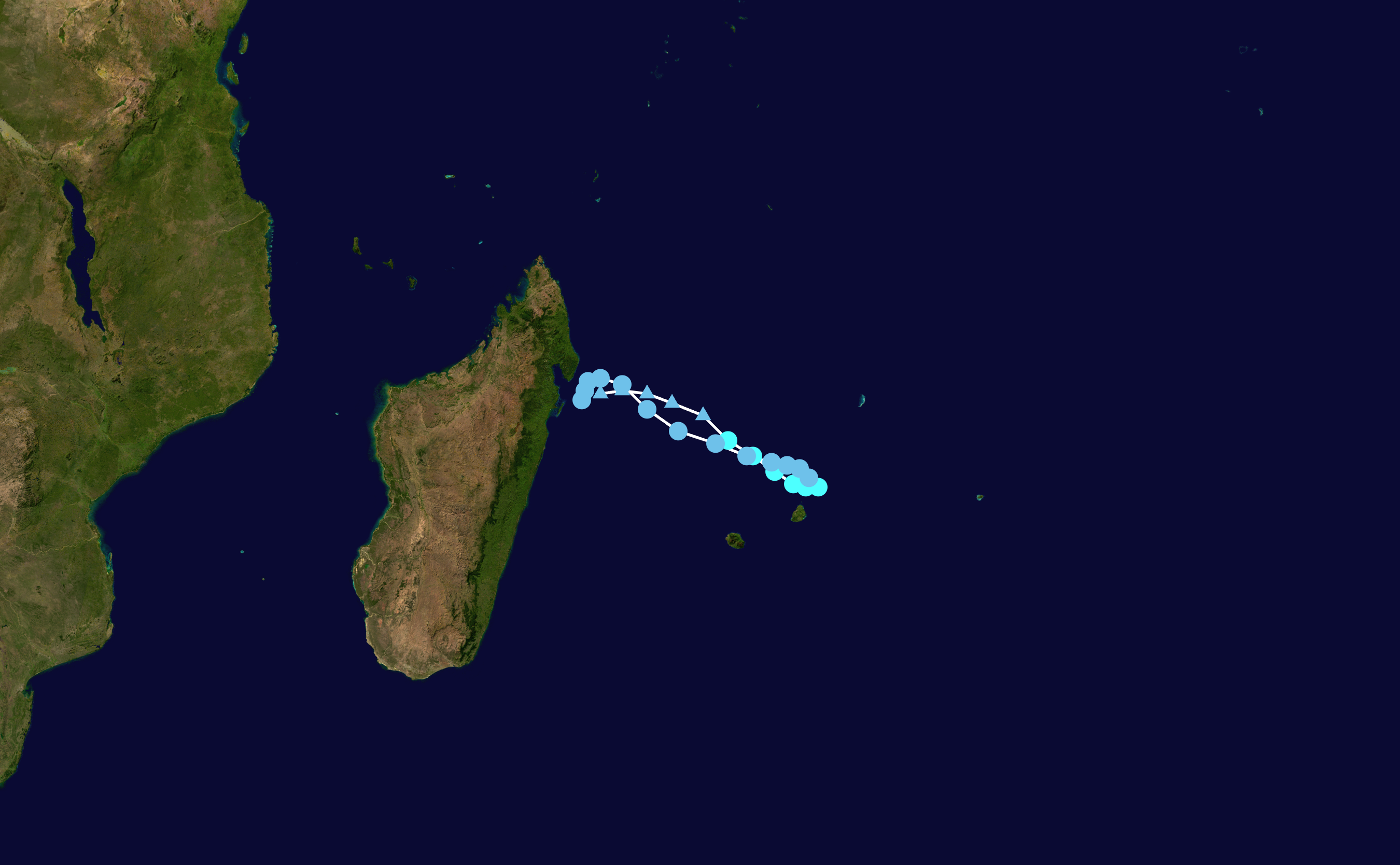
- Duration: February 18 – February 23
- Peak intensity: 95 km/h (60 mph) (10-min); 992 hPa (mbar)

On February 15, a broad low-pressure area developed east of Madagascar. Over the next few days, the system dropped heavy rainfall to the Mascarene Islands. St. Brandon recorded 229 mm (9.0 in) of rainfall over 24 hours, and Plaisance Airport on Mauritius recorded 177 mm (7.0 in) of rainfall in 48 hours. The heaviest precipitation occurred on Réunion in a short amount of time, with 1-in-50 year rainfall rates. A station in the capital Saint-Denis recorded 376 mm (14.8 in) in just three hours, and over 48 hours, Le Brûlé recorded 1,274 mm (50.2 in) of precipitation. A weak low-pressure area began organizing within the trough on February 17, organizing enough to be classified as Tropical Disturbance 09 the next day just off the eastern coast of Madagascar. A small system, it developed a concentrated area of convection just 200 km (120 mi) in diameter, which followed a powerful hot tower that spurred development. The structure rapidly organized, and by February 19, there was an eye-like feature in the center of the thunderstorms. At 18:00 UTC that day, the JTWC classified it as Tropical Cyclone 12S, and the MFR upgraded it to a moderate tropical storm. Forecasters initially assessed the structure as akin to a mesoscale convective vortex, which is a small and short-lived system, and there was also uncertainty whether the winds were at the surface. As a result, there was a disagreement between the MFR, which estimated peak 10 minute winds of 95 km/h (59 mph), and the Meteorological Service of Mauritius, which assessed a much weaker storm. The latter agency is responsible for officially naming systems, and as a result, the severe tropical storm was unnamed.

Moving southeastward in the flow of the trough, the small storm began weakening on February 20 due to strong northwesterly wind shear, which caused the convection to dwindle over the circulation. That day, the storm passed just 80 km (50 mi) north of Mauritius, by which time the center was exposed and the intensity had dropped to tropical depression status. It turned back to the northwest, steered by the low-level trade winds and following its previous path. Late on February 20, the JTWC discontinued advisories, and three days later, the circulation dissipated off the east coast of Madagascar.

=== Intense Tropical Cyclone Carina ===
- Intense tropical cyclone (MFR)
- Category 4 tropical cyclone (SSHWS)
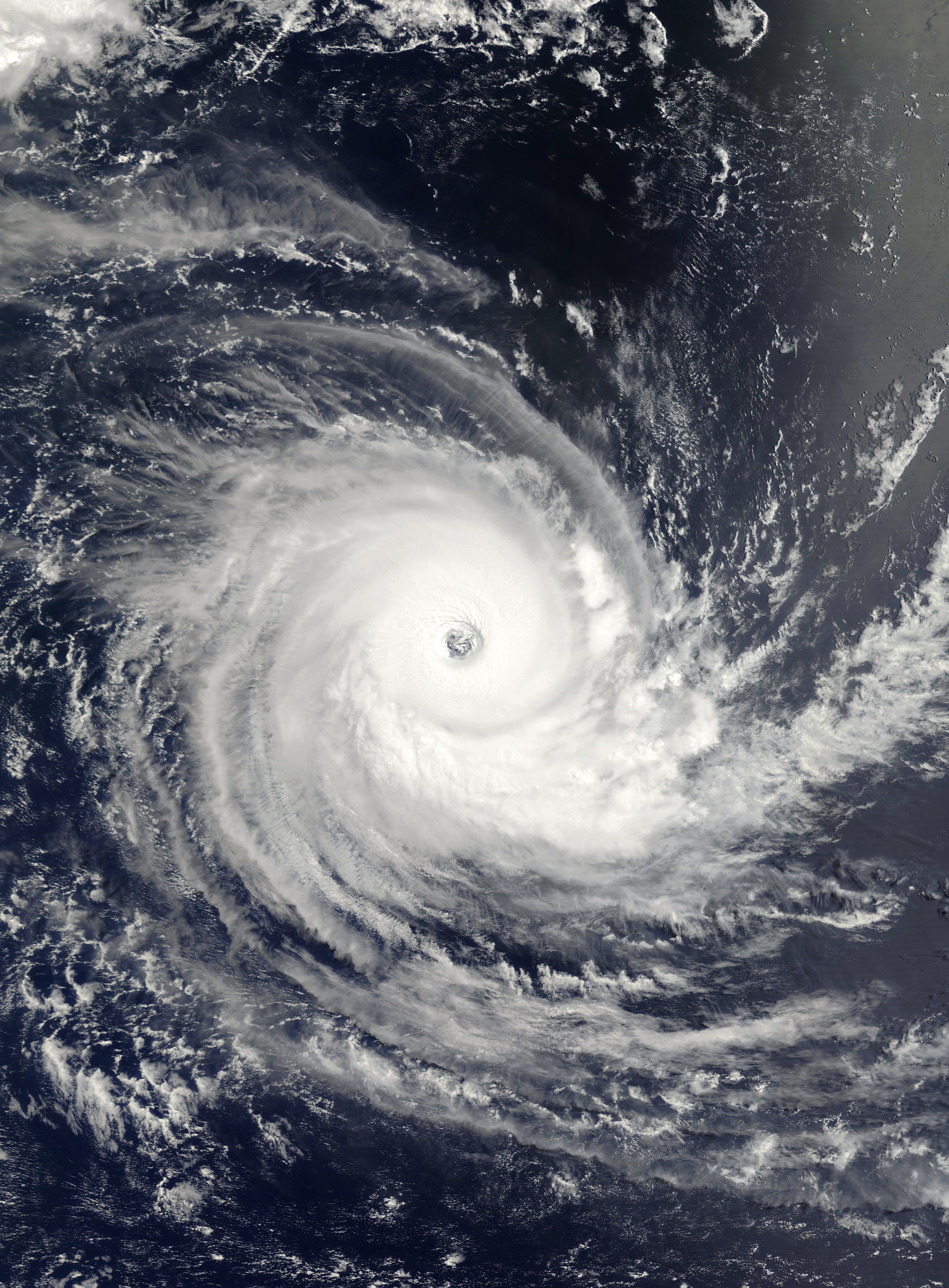
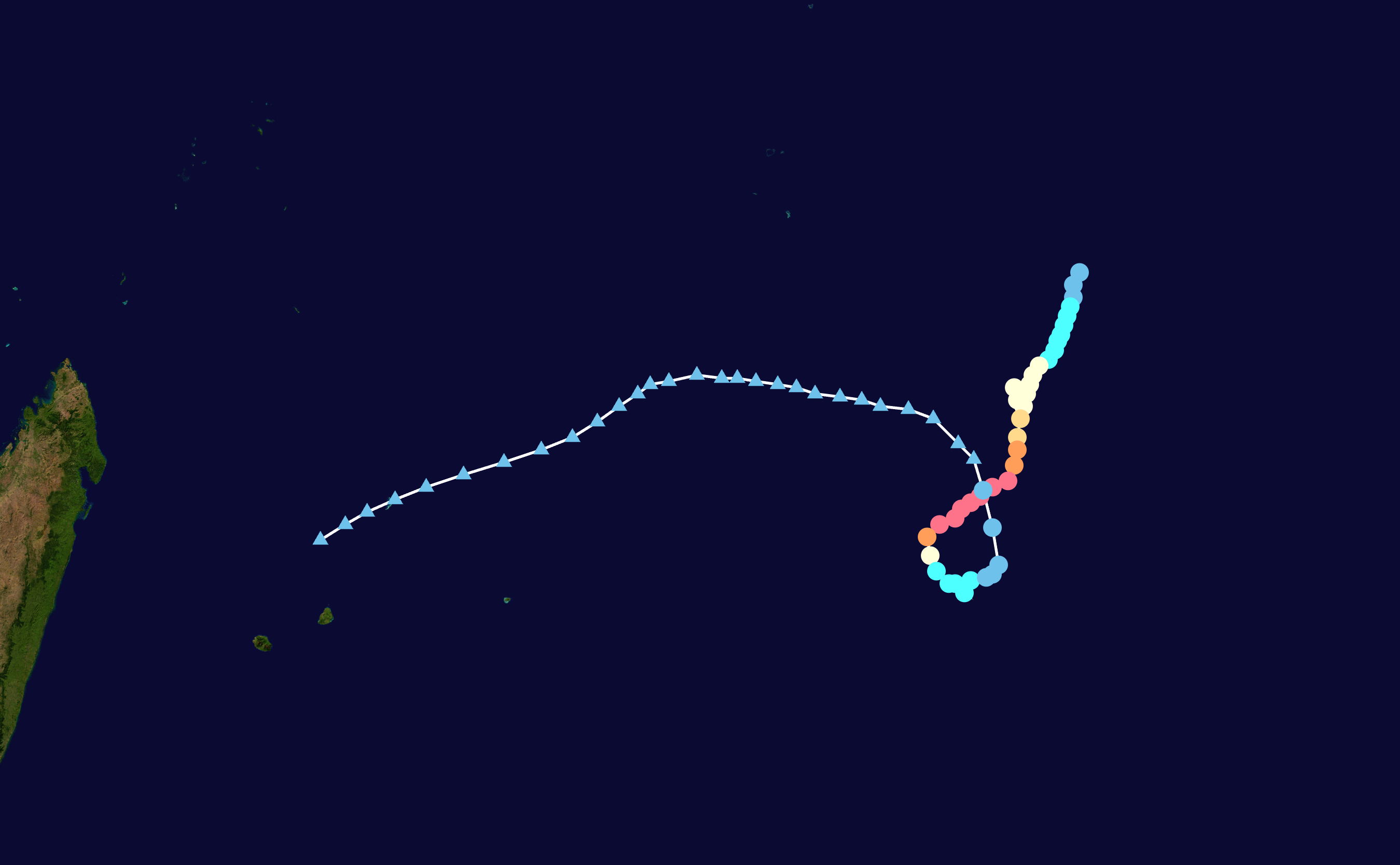
- Duration: February 22 – March 11
- Peak intensity: 205 km/h (125 mph) (10-min); 915 hPa (mbar)

An active phase of the Madden–Julian oscillation increased convection across the northeastern periphery of the basin, and the ITCZ produced a distinct low-pressure area on February 21 to the east of Diego Garcia. The convective structure organized, aided by good outflow and moderate but lessening wind shear. A ridge to its southeast steered the nascent system slowly to the southwest into an area of increasingly favorable conditions. On February 22, the system was classified as Tropical Disturbance 10. The next day, the Mauritius Meteorological Service named the disturbance Carina while it was still an intensifying system. Also on February 23, the JTWC initiated warnings on the storm as Tropical Cyclone 14S. On the next day, the MFR upgraded Carina to a moderate tropical storm. The storm stalled on February 25 due to weakness in the ridge, and on the same day, the JTWC upgraded the storm to the equivalent of hurricane status with 1 minute winds of 120 km/h (75 mph). By that time, an eye had developed within the center of increasingly organized convection, and the MFR upgraded Carina to tropical cyclone status on February 26.

Continued favorable conditions, including minimal wind shear and powerful outflow, allowed Carina to intensify further while progressing slowly southwestward. Late on February 27, the MFR upgraded the storm to an intense tropical cyclone, and the eye reached a diameter of 70 km (43 mi). Based on the storm's presentation on satellite imagery, the MFR estimated peak 10 minute winds of 205 km/h (127 mph) on February 28. On the same day, the JTWC estimated peak 1 minute winds of 240 km/h (150 mph). Unfavorable conditions – cooler waters and stronger wind shear – caused Carina's structure to rapidly degrade after the peak intensity. By March 2, the storm weakened below tropical cyclone status, and soon after the circulation became exposed from the convection, prompting the JTWC to discontinue advisories. Carina stalled that day when it reached a col between two ridges; as a result, the track shifted to the northeast and later northwest due to the building influence of the ridge to the southeast. Environmental conditions prevented significant convection to regenerate, and the circulation of Carina turned westward across the Indian Ocean without redevelopment. It turned back to the southwest, passing near St. Brandon on March 10. The MFR stopped tracking Carina on the next day, and the circulation dissipated on March 13 to the southeast of Madagascar.

=== Severe Tropical Storm Diwa ===
- Severe tropical storm (MFR)
- Tropical storm (SSHWS)
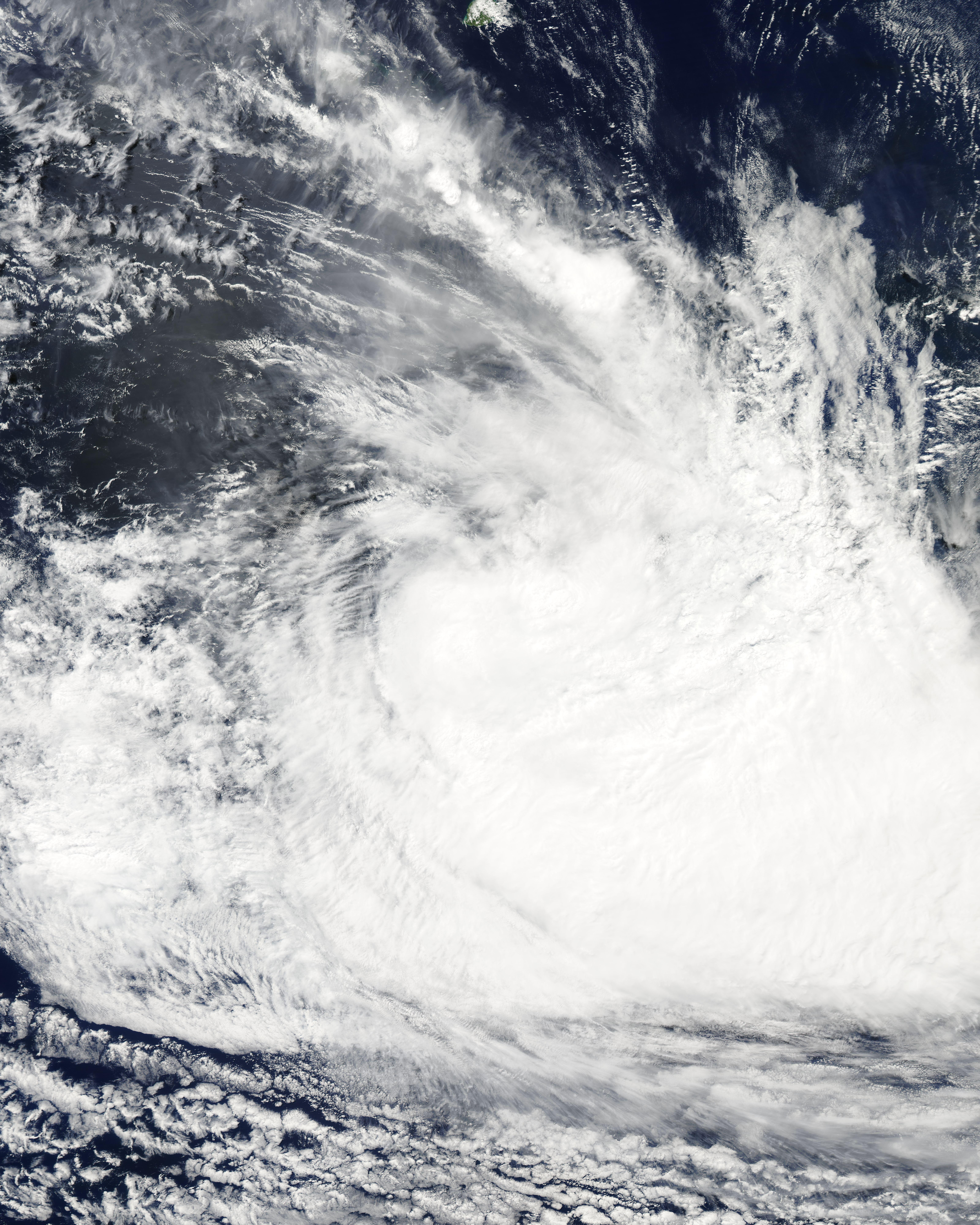
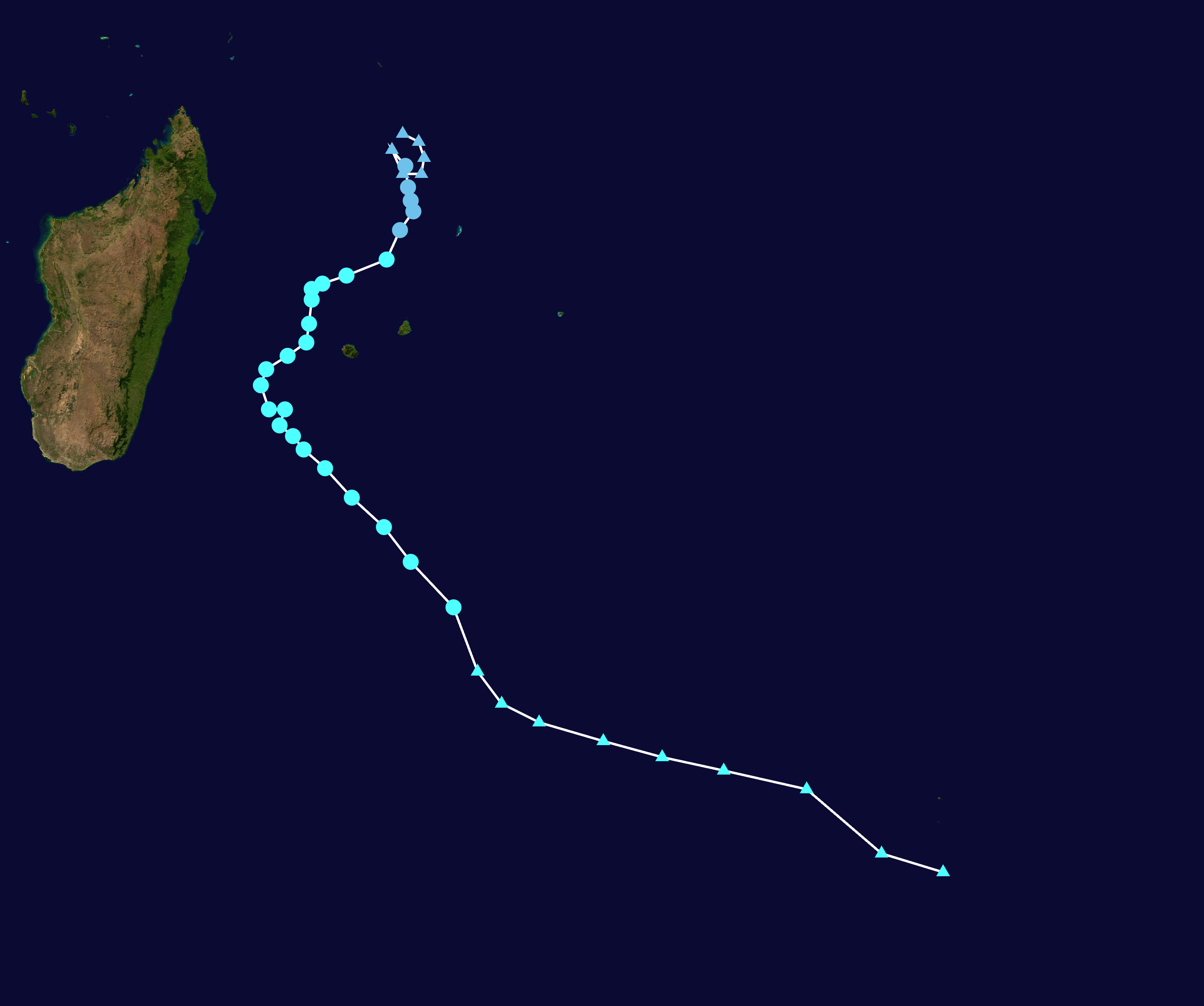
- Duration: March 2 – March 8
- Peak intensity: 110 km/h (70 mph) (10-min); 980 hPa (mbar)

In the beginning of March, the monsoon was active to the northeast of Madagascar, the first time during the season that such active convection persisted northeast of the island. The broad system had two foci of low pressure; one was located northeast of Madagascar near St. Brandon, and the other was to its south closer to Réunion. The structure resembled a monsoon depression, but as the two low-pressure areas consolidated, they became more distinct. On March 2, the system that would become Diwa originated out of the southern low, and both systems continued to interact until Diwa absorbed the other disturbance. The wind field was large and asymmetrical, ranging 2,000 km (1,200 mi) in diameter, and there was little convection near the centers. Despite the lack of organization, the Meteorological Service of Mauritius named the system Tropical Storm Diwa on March 3 due to the threat to the Mascarene Islands, as well as the presence of gale-force winds. The structure slowly evolved into that of a tropical cyclone as the convection concentrated. On March 4, Diwa passed northwest of Réunion, still disorganized with much of the convection to the south. That day, the JTWC initiated advisories on the system as Tropical Cyclone 16S. The storm continued slowly to the southwest at first, until it turned to the southeast on March 6 while rounding the ridge. Despite accelerating into an area of cooler waters, Diwa's structure became much more like a tropical cyclone on March 8. The MFR estimated peak 10 minute winds of 110 km/h (68 mph), making it a severe tropical storm, and the JTWC estimated peak 1 minute winds of 100 km/h (62 mph). Diwa quickly transitioned into an extratropical cyclone as it interacted with a cold front to the south, completing the transition by March 9. The circulation gradually lost its definition, dissipating on March 11.

The formative stages of Diwa brought heavy rainfall, reaching 193 mm (7.6 in) over 48 hours, to St. Brandon, as well as gale-force winds, with gusts to 120 km/h (75 mph). Along Mauritius, winds reached 126 km/h (78 mph), along with 495 mm (19.5 in) of rainfall at a station in the southeastern portion of the island. Gale-force winds affected Réunion for nearly three days, due to the storm's lopsided structure, and gusts peaked at 194 km/h (121 mph) along the coast. Diwa dropped the equivalent of six months' worth of rainfall, peaking at 2,943 mm (115.9 in) at Grand-Îlet over four days, which approached the record totals set by Cyclone Hyacinthe in 1980, making it the 6th wettest tropical system in history. The volcanic peak Commerson's Crater recorded 1,474 mm (58.0 in) over 24 hours, while coastal areas just 15 km (9.3 mi) away recorded 188 mm (7.4 in) of rainfall over the same time. The storm caused power outages on the island, and three people died due to using a generator inside their home during the storm. One person drowned during the floods, and four people drowned in residual flooding accidents on the island in the weeks after the storm. The floods wrecked several homes during river flooding and caused several landslides, some of which occurred two weeks after the storm due to saturated grounds. On March 24, a cliff collapsed onto a coastal road, killing two people and severely injuring two others; the road was reopened three months later. In addition to the damaging effects, the rainfall also alleviated drought conditions.

=== Moderate Tropical Storm Elia ===
- Moderate tropical storm (MFR)
- Tropical storm (SSHWS)
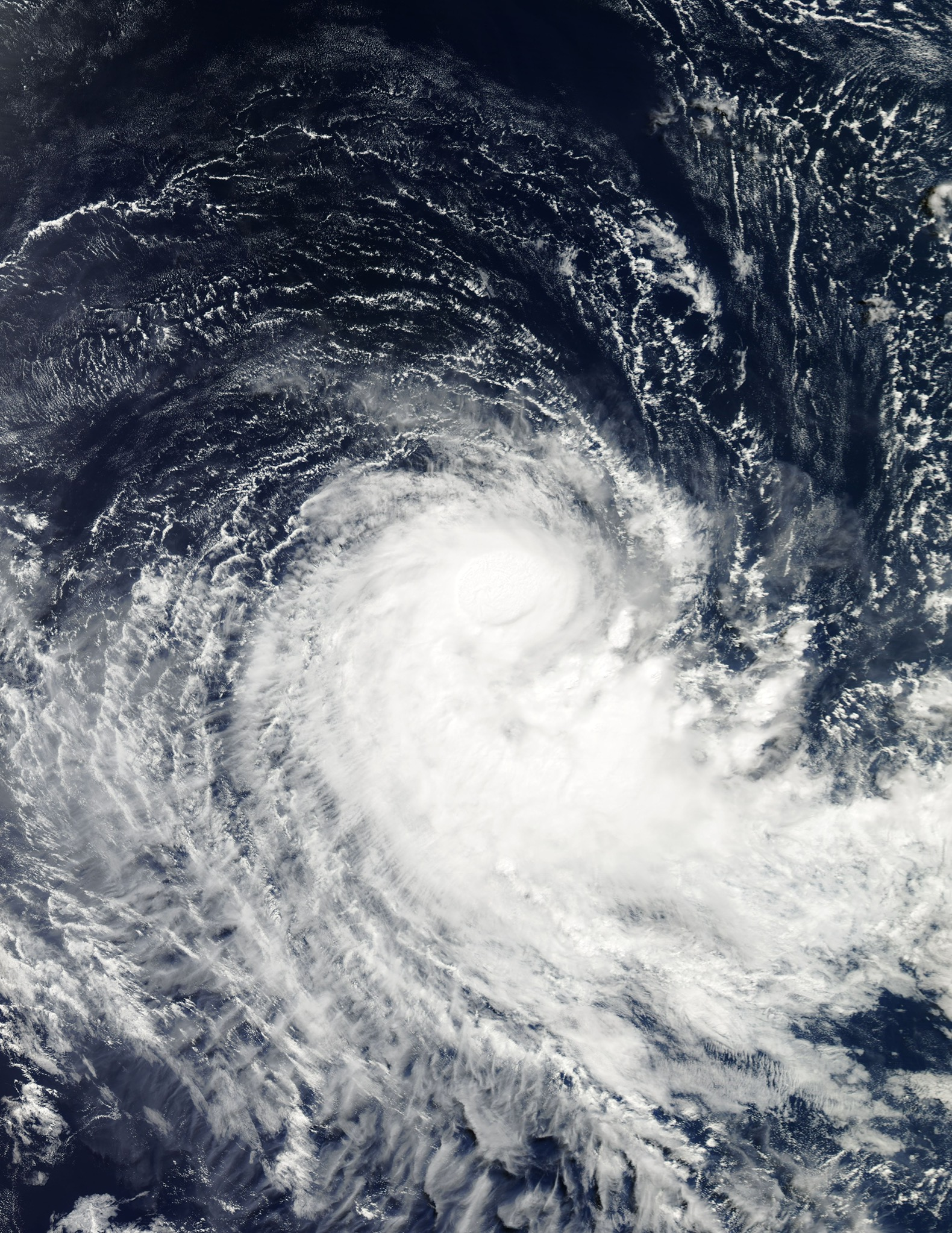
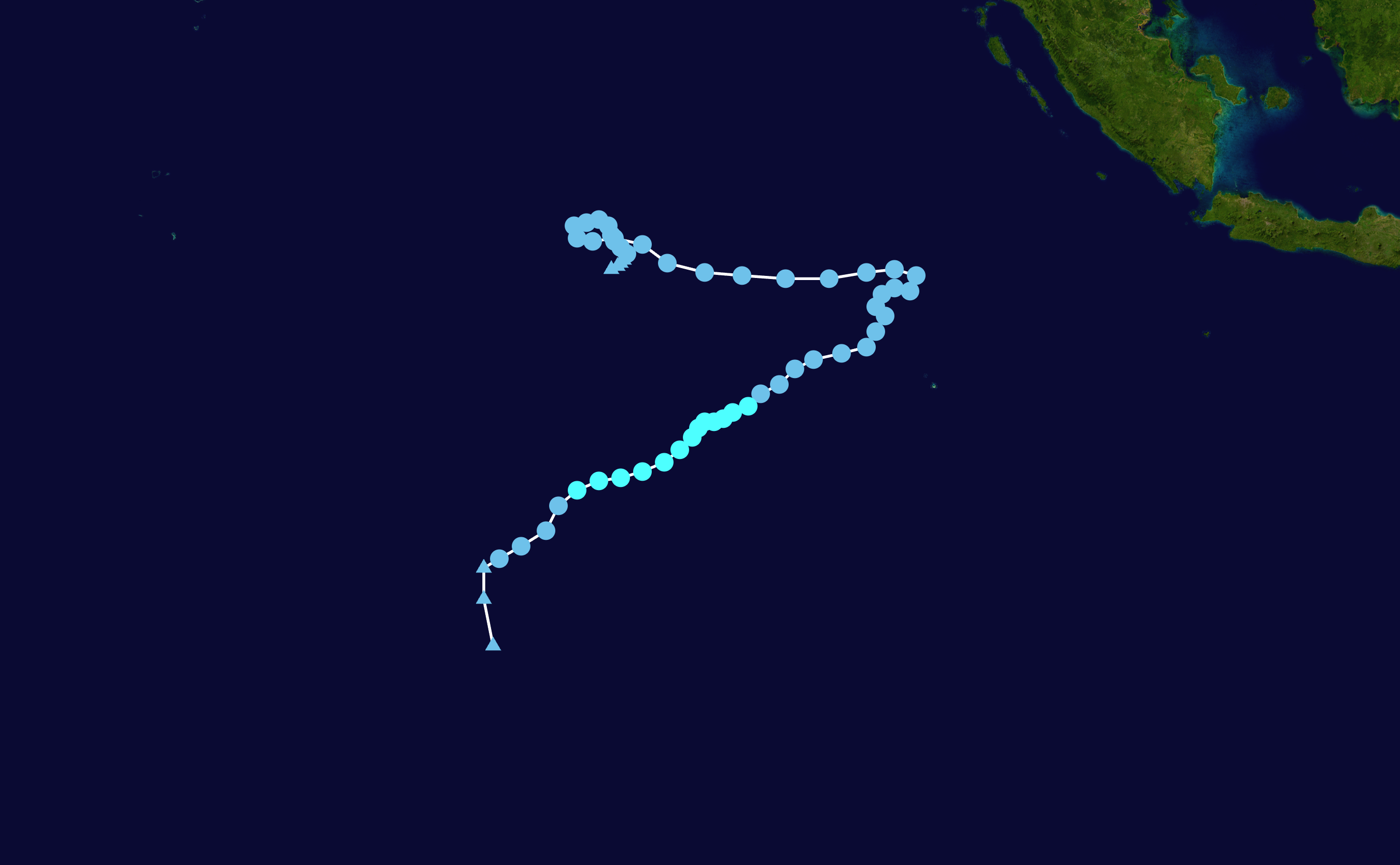
- Duration: April 6 – April 17 (out of basin April 7–13)
- Peak intensity: 75 km/h (45 mph) (10-min); 990 hPa (mbar)

At the end of March, an active phase of the Madden–Julian oscillation caused an increase in convection over the northeastern portion of the basin. A low-pressure area formed on April 1 in the neighboring Australian basin, although the system soon after moved northwestward to cross 90º E. The low meandered for several days, unable to intensify much due to insufficient moisture in the region. On April 6, the MFR designated the system as Tropical Disturbance 13, although the agency discontinued advisories on the next day. On April 7, the low crossed back into the Australian basin, only to turn to the southwest on April 10, steered by a ridge to the southeast. During this time, the system passed about 185 km (115 mi) northwest of the Cocos Islands. On April 12, the JTWC designated the system as Tropical Cyclone 12S. On the same day, the system intensified into a tropical depression, after the convective structure improved amid favoring conditions.

Early on April 13, the depression crossed 90º E into the south-west Indian Ocean. By that time, the system had good outflow to the south, although lack of moisture prevented significant development. Late on April 13, the MFR upgraded the system to Moderate Tropical Storm Elia, assessing peak 10 minute winds of 75 km/h (47 mph). The JTWC meanwhile estimated 1 minute winds of 95 km/h (59 mph). Increasing wind shear and cooler waters resulted in diminished intensity of the convection, causing Elia to weaken. The MFR downgraded the storm to tropical depression status on April 15 after the circulation became exposed. On the same day, the JTWC discontinued advisories. The circulation dissipated on April 17, signaling the end of the season.

=== Other systems ===
Tropical Disturbance 12 briefly was classified by the MFR on March 4, located 620 km (390 mi) north of the developing Tropical Storm Diwa. The disturbance moved quickly to the southeast around Diwa's circulation, and was ultimately absorbed by the larger storm.

== Storm names ==
A tropical disturbance is named when it reaches moderate tropical storm strength. If a tropical disturbance reaches moderate tropical storm status west of 55°E, then the Sub-regional Tropical Cyclone Advisory Centre in Madagascar assigns the appropriate name to the storm. If a tropical disturbance reaches moderate tropical storm status between 55°E and 90°E, then the Sub-regional Tropical Cyclone Advisory Centre in Mauritius assigns the appropriate name to the storm. A new annual list is used every year so no names are retired.

- Alvin
- Boloetse
- Carina
- Diwa
- Elia
- Farda (unused)
- Guduza (unused)
- Helio (unused)
- Isabella (unused)
- Jaone (unused)
- Kundai (unused)
- Lindsay (unused)
- Marinda (unused)
- Nadety (unused)
- Otile (unused)
- Pindile (unused)
- Quincy (unused)
- Rugare (unused)
- Sebina (unused)
- Timba (unused)
- Usta (unused)
- Velo (unused)
- Wilby (unused)
- Xanda (unused)
- Yuri (unused)
- Zoelle (unused)

== See also ==
- List of Southern Hemisphere tropical cyclone seasons
- Tropical cyclones in 2005 and 2006
- Atlantic hurricane seasons: 2005, 2006
- Pacific hurricane seasons: 2005, 2006
- Pacific typhoon seasons: 2005, 2006
- North Indian Ocean cyclone seasons: 2005, 2006
