= 125th meridian =

125th meridian may refer to:

- 125th meridian east, a line of longitude east of the Greenwich Meridian
- 125th meridian west, a line of longitude west of the Greenwich Meridian

125th meridian west	125th meridian east
