= 130th meridian =

130th meridian can refer to:

- 130th meridian east, a line of longitude east of the Greenwich Meridian
- 130th meridian west, a line of longitude west of the Greenwich Meridian

130th meridian west	130th meridian east
