= 129th meridian =

129th meridian may refer to:

- 129th meridian east, a line of longitude east of the Greenwich Meridian
- 129th meridian west, a line of longitude west of the Greenwich Meridian

129th meridian west	129th meridian east
