= 50th meridian =

50th meridian may refer to:

- 50th meridian east, a line of longitude east of the Greenwich Meridian
- 50th meridian west, a line of longitude west of the Greenwich Meridian
