= 52nd meridian east =

Line of longitude

52nd meridian east

The meridian 52° east of Greenwich is a line of longitude that extends from the North Pole across the Arctic Ocean, Europe, Asia, the Indian Ocean, the Southern Ocean, and Antarctica to the South Pole.

The 52nd meridian east forms a great circle with the 128th meridian west.

== From Pole to Pole ==
Starting at the North Pole and heading south to the South Pole, the 52nd meridian east passes through:

Co-ordinates	Country, territory or sea	Notes
90°0′N 52°0′E	Arctic Ocean	
80°41′N 52°0′E	Barents Sea	Passing between Zemlya Georga and Hooker Island, Franz Josef Land, Russia
72°6′N 52°0′E	Russia	Yuzhny Island, Novaya Zemlya
71°28′N 52°0′E	Barents Sea	
68°32′N 52°0′E	Russia	
51°40′N 52°0′E	Kazakhstan	
46°49′N 52°0′E	Caspian Sea	
45°24′N 52°0′E	Kazakhstan	Mangyshlak Peninsula
42°51′N 52°0′E	Caspian Sea	
36°35′N 52°0′E	Iran	
27°50′N 52°0′E	Persian Gulf	
24°12′N 52°0′E	United Arab Emirates	An island in the emirate of Abu Dhabi
24°10′N 52°0′E	Persian Gulf	
23°59′N 52°0′E	United Arab Emirates	Emirate of Abu Dhabi
23°37′N 52°0′E	Saudi Arabia	The meridian touches on the westernmost point of Oman at the border with Yemen
19°0′N 52°0′E	Yemen	
15°32′N 52°0′E	Indian Ocean	Passing just west of the island of Abd al Kuri, Yemen; Passing between Île de la Possession and Île de l'Est, French Southern and Antarctic Lands
60°0′S 52°0′E	Southern Ocean	
66°0′S 52°0′E	Antarctica	Australian Antarctic Territory, claimed by Australia

== See also ==
- 51st meridian east
- 53rd meridian east
