= 51st meridian east =

Line of longitude

51st meridian east

The meridian 51° east of Greenwich is a line of longitude that extends from the North Pole across the Arctic Ocean, Europe, Asia, Africa, the Indian Ocean, the Southern Ocean, and Antarctica to the South Pole.

The 51st meridian east forms a great circle with the 129th meridian west.

== From Pole to Pole ==
Starting at the North Pole and heading south to the South Pole, the 51st meridian east passes through:

Co-ordinates	Country, territory or sea	Notes
90°0′N 51°0′E	Arctic Ocean	
81°9′N 51°0′E	Russia	Arthur Island, Franz Josef Land
81°6′N 51°0′E	Barents Sea	
80°52′N 51°0′E	Russia	Island of Zemlya Georga, Franz Josef Land
80°33′N 51°0′E	Barents Sea	
80°6′N 51°0′E	Russia	Northbrook Island, Franz Josef Land
79°55′N 51°0′E	Barents Sea	
68°28′N 51°0′E	Russia	
51°41′N 51°0′E	Kazakhstan	
46°56′N 51°0′E	Caspian Sea	
45°0′N 51°0′E	Kazakhstan	Mangyshlak Peninsula
44°49′N 51°0′E	Caspian Sea	Mangyshlak Bay
44°31′N 51°0′E	Kazakhstan	Mangyshlak Peninsula
43°54′N 51°0′E	Caspian Sea	
36°46′N 51°0′E	Iran	
28°51′N 51°0′E	Persian Gulf	
25°59′N 51°0′E	Qatar	
24°35′N 51°0′E	Saudi Arabia	
18°47′N 51°0′E	Yemen	
15°8′N 51°0′E	Indian Ocean	Gulf of Aden
11°54′N 51°0′E	Somalia	
10°22′N 51°0′E	Indian Ocean	
9°13′S 51°0′E	Seychelles	Providence Atoll
9°32′S 51°0′E	Indian Ocean	Passing just west of Farquhar Atoll, Seychelles; Passing between the Crozet Islands, French Southern and Antarctic Lands
60°0′S 51°0′E	Southern Ocean	
66°16′S 51°0′E	Antarctica	Australian Antarctic Territory, claimed by Australia

== See also ==
- 50th meridian east
- 52nd meridian east
