= 126th meridian west =

Line of longitude

126th meridian west

The meridian 126° west of Greenwich is a line of longitude that extends from the North Pole across the Arctic Ocean, North America, the Pacific Ocean, the Southern Ocean, and Antarctica to the South Pole.

The 126th meridian west forms a great circle with the 54th meridian east.

== From Pole to Pole ==
Starting at the North Pole and heading south to the South Pole, the 126th meridian west passes through:

| Co-ordinates | Country, territory or sea | Notes |
|---|---|---|
| 90°0′N 126°0′W | Arctic Ocean | |
| 75°52′N 126°0′W | Beaufort Sea | |
| 71°59′N 126°0′W | Canada | Northwest Territories — for about 1 km, westernmost point of Banks Island (Cape Kellett) |
| 71°58′N 126°0′W | Amundsen Gulf | |
| 69°25′N 126°0′W | Canada | Northwest Territories; Yukon — from 60°49′N 168°0′W; British Columbia — from 60°0′N 126°0′W, the mainland, Vancouver Island and Vargas Island |
| 49°9′N 126°0′W | Pacific Ocean | |
| 60°0′S 126°0′W | Southern Ocean | |
| 73°6′S 126°0′W | Antarctica | Unclaimed territory |

== See also ==
- 125th meridian west
- 127th meridian west
