= 125th meridian west =

Line of longitude

125th meridian west

The meridian 125° west of Greenwich is a line of longitude that extends from the North Pole across the Arctic Ocean, North America, the Pacific Ocean, the Southern Ocean, and Antarctica to the South Pole.

The 125th meridian west forms a great circle with the 55th meridian east.

== From Pole to Pole ==
Starting at the North Pole and heading south to the South Pole, the 125th meridian west passes through:

Co-ordinates	Country, territory or sea	Notes
90°0′N 125°0′W	Arctic Ocean	
76°1′N 125°0′W	Beaufort Sea	
72°52′N 125°0′W	Canada	Northwest Territories — Banks Island
71°53′N 125°0′W	Amundsen Gulf	
70°11′N 125°0′W	Canada	Northwest Territories — passing through the Great Bear Lake; Yukon — from 60°51′N 125°0′W; British Columbia — from 60°0′N 125°0′W, the mainland, Raza Island and Cortes Island
50°5′N 125°0′W	Strait of Georgia	
49°48′N 125°0′W	Canada	British Columbia — Vancouver Island, through Courtenay
48°42′N 125°0′W	Pacific Ocean	Passing just west of Cape Alava, Washington, United States (at 48°10′N 124°44′W); Passing just west of Ducie Island, Pitcairn Islands (at 24°41′S 124°47′W)
60°0′S 125°0′W	Southern Ocean	
73°17′S 125°0′W	Antarctica	Unclaimed territory

== See also ==
- 124th meridian west
- 126th meridian west
