= 54th meridian east =

Line of longitude

54th meridian east

The meridian 54° east of Greenwich is a line of longitude that extends from the North Pole across the Arctic Ocean, Europe, Asia, the Indian Ocean, the Southern Ocean, and Antarctica to the South Pole.

The 54th meridian east forms a great circle with the 126th meridian west.

== From Pole to Pole ==
Starting at the North Pole and heading south to the South Pole, the 54th meridian east passes through:

Co-ordinates	Country, territory or sea	Notes
90°0′N 54°0′E	Arctic Ocean	
80°36′N 54°0′E	Russia	Nansen Island, Franz Josef Land
80°26′N 54°0′E	Barents Sea	
80°20′N 54°0′E	Russia	Royal Society Island, Franz Josef Land
80°17′N 54°0′E	Barents Sea	
73°47′N 54°0′E	Russia	Severny Island, Novaya Zemlya
73°37′N 54°0′E	Barents Sea	
73°17′N 54°0′E	Russia	Yuzhny Island, Novaya Zemlya
70°43′N 54°0′E	Barents Sea	Pechora Sea
68°58′N 54°0′E	Russia	Khodovarikha peninsula
68°55′N 54°0′E	Barents Sea	Pechora Bay
68°13′N 54°0′E	Russia	
51°10′N 54°0′E	Kazakhstan	
42°20′N 54°0′E	Turkmenistan	Passing through Garabogazköl lake
37°20′N 54°0′E	Iran	
26°45′N 54°0′E	Persian Gulf	
26°34′N 54°0′E	Iran	Kish Island
26°30′N 54°0′E	Persian Gulf	
24°5′N 54°0′E	United Arab Emirates	Emirate of Abu Dhabi
22°46′N 54°0′E	Saudi Arabia	
19°40′N 54°0′E	Oman	Passing just west of Salalah
16°56′N 54°0′E	Indian Ocean	Gulf of Aden
12°39′N 54°0′E	Yemen	Island of Socotra
12°19′N 54°0′E	Indian Ocean	Passing just east of the Amirante Islands, Seychelles
60°0′S 54°0′E	Southern Ocean	
65°52′S 54°0′E	Antarctica	Australian Antarctic Territory, claimed by Australia

== See also ==
- 53rd meridian east
- 55th meridian east
