= 129th meridian west =

Line of longitude

129th meridian west

The meridian 129° west of Greenwich is a line of longitude that extends from the North Pole across the Arctic Ocean, North America, the Pacific Ocean, the Southern Ocean, and Antarctica to the South Pole.

The 129th meridian west forms a great circle with the 51st meridian east.

== From Pole to Pole ==
Starting at the North Pole and heading south to the South Pole, the 129th meridian west passes through:

Co-ordinates	Country, territory or sea	Notes
90°0′N 129°0′W	Arctic Ocean	
75°25′N 129°0′W	Beaufort Sea	
69°55′N 129°0′W	Canada	Northwest Territories; Yukon — from 62°8′N 129°0′W; British Columbia — from 60°0′N 129°0′W, the mainland, and Maitland, Hawkesbury, Gribbell, Princess Royal and Aristazabal islands
52°28′N 129°0′W	Pacific Ocean	
60°0′S 129°0′W	Southern Ocean	
74°19′S 129°0′W	Antarctica	Unclaimed territory

== See also ==
- 128th meridian west
- 130th meridian west
