= 55th meridian east =

Line of longitude

55th meridian east

The meridian 55° east of Greenwich is a line of longitude that extends from the North Pole across the Arctic Ocean, Europe, Asia, the Indian Ocean, the Southern Ocean, and Antarctica to the South Pole.

The 55th meridian east forms a great circle with the 125th meridian west.

== From Pole to Pole ==
Starting at the North Pole and heading south to the South Pole, the 55th meridian east passes through:

| Co-ordinates | Country, territory or sea | Notes |
|---|---|---|
| 90°0′N 55°0′E | Arctic Ocean | |
| 81°5′N 55°0′E | Russia | Salisbury Island and Luigi Island, Franz Josef Land |
| 80°42′N 55°0′E | Barents Sea | |
| 80°30′N 55°0′E | Russia | Islands in Franz Josef Land |
| 80°24′N 55°0′E | Barents Sea | |
| 74°8′N 55°0′E | Russia | Severny Island and Yuzhny Island, Novaya Zemlya |
| 70°35′N 55°0′E | Barents Sea | Pechora Sea |
| 68°56′N 55°0′E | Russia | A small island |
| 68°55′N 55°0′E | Barents Sea | Pechora Bay |
| 68°25′N 55°0′E | Russia | |
| 50°53′N 55°0′E | Kazakhstan | |
| 41°47′N 55°0′E | Turkmenistan | |
| 37°50′N 55°0′E | Iran | |
| 26°37′N 55°0′E | Persian Gulf | Passing just west of the island of Abu Musa, Iran (claimed by United Arab Emirates) |
| 24°58′N 55°0′E | United Arab Emirates | Passing through Jebel Ali, Emirate of Dubai |
| 22°39′N 55°0′E | Saudi Arabia | |
| 20°0′N 55°0′E | Oman | |
| 17°1′S 55°0′E | Indian Ocean | Passing just west of Silhouette Island, Seychelles; Passing just west of the island of Réunion, France |
| 60°0′S 55°0′E | Southern Ocean | |
| 65°53′S 55°0′E | Antarctica | Australian Antarctic Territory, claimed by Australia |

== See also ==
- 54th meridian east
- 56th meridian east
