= Hakai Institute =

Canadian research institute

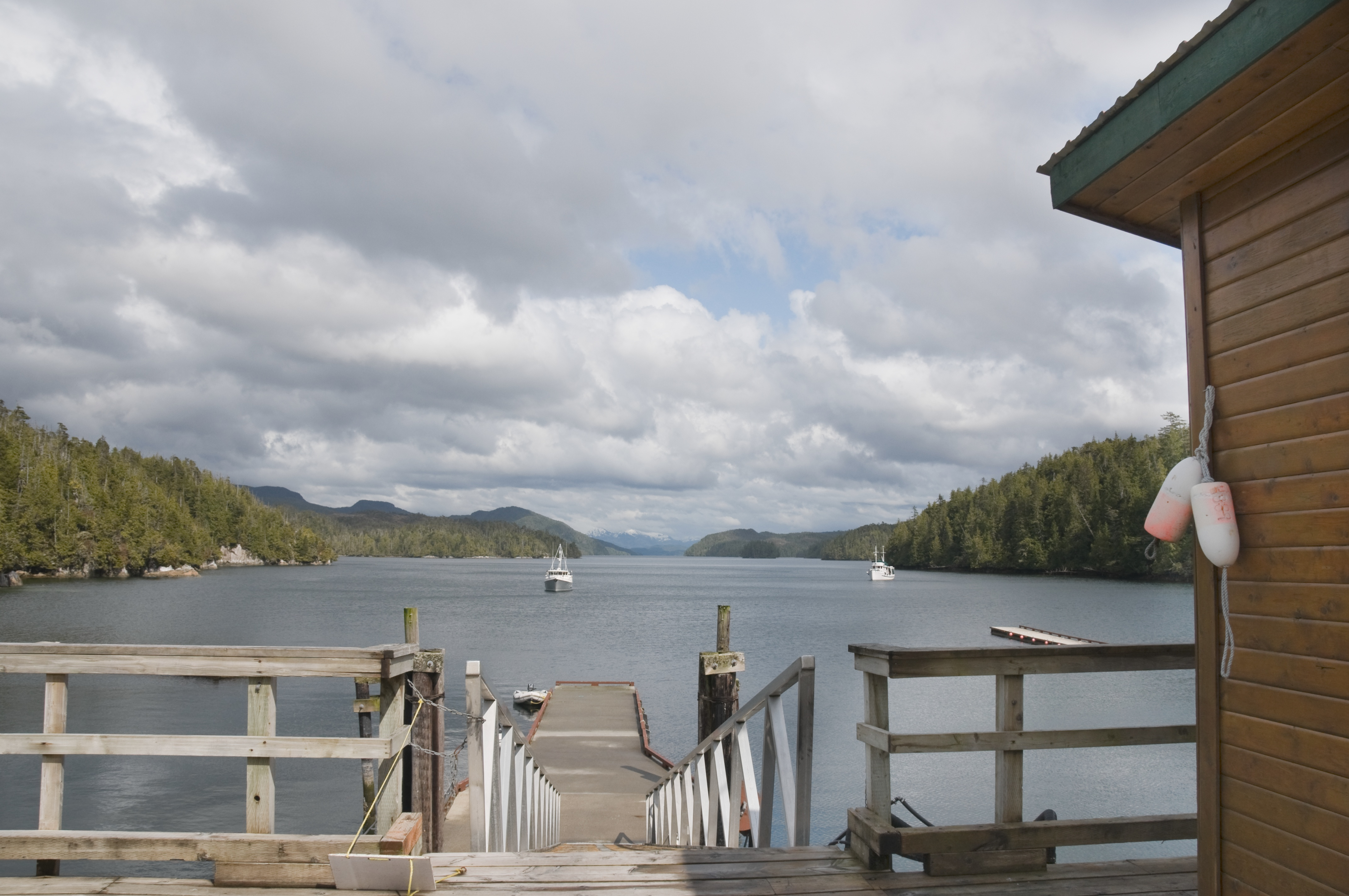
- Looking east across Pruth Bay from the Hakai Institute campus (then a fishing lodge) in 2008
- Established: 2002; 24 years ago
- Laboratory type: Ecological observatory
- Location: Calvert Island, British Columbia, Canada; 51°39′16″N 128°07′53″W
- Operating agency: Tula Foundation
- Website: www.hakai.org

Map
- Location within British Columbia

The Hakai Institute (formerly the Hakai Beach Institute) is a scientific research, teaching, and meeting center established by Eric Peterson and Christina Munck on Calvert Island, a remote island on the exposed Pacific edge of the Great Bear Rainforest on the Central Coast of British Columbia, Canada. The Hakai Institute is a program of the Tula Foundation, a British Columbia-based private foundation also founded by Peterson and Munck. The Hakai Institute specializes in "long-term ecological research".

The Hakai Institute has active research programs in archaeology, earth sciences, terrestrial ecology, and marine ecology. The institute enjoys partnerships with neighbouring First Nations, local schools, government agencies, and the BC universities. The institute has partnered with numerous universities and government institutions in researching the ecology of the wider British Columbia Coast.

== History ==
In 2002, the Tula Foundation founded the Hakai Institute, with the goal of purchasing and preserving land along the Central Coast. Over time, the focus shifted to scientific research.

In 2008, the institute partnered with British Columbia universities and the Wuikinuxv First Nation to conduct a comprehensive ecological study of Rivers Inlet.

In 2009, the institute purchased the former Hakai Beach Resort on Calvert Island. The fishing lodge was converted to an ecological observatory and opened the following spring to host the 2010 Coastal Guardian Watchmen conference.

In 2014, the institute established a second ecological observatory on Quadra Island near the town of Campbell River.

In 2015, the Hakai Institute launched Hakai Magazine, an online magazine publishing short and feature-length journalistic stories on topics related to coastal science, ecology, and communities. The founding editor of the magazine was science journalist Jude Isabella.

In 2018, researchers at the institute announced the discovery of human footprints, dated to 13,000 years old (13 kya). They are believed to be the earliest ever found in North America. Their existence supports the theory that the earliest humans in North America initially worked their way down the Pacific coastline.

In July 2024, Hakai Magazine announced that it would cease publishing by the end of the year.

== See also ==
- Wuikinuxv First Nation
