= 127th meridian west =

Line of longitude

127th meridian west

The meridian 127° west of Greenwich is a line of longitude that extends from the North Pole across the Arctic Ocean, North America, the Pacific Ocean, the Southern Ocean, and Antarctica to the South Pole.

The 127th meridian west forms a great circle with the 53rd meridian east.

== From Pole to Pole ==
Starting at the North Pole and heading south to the South Pole, the 127th meridian west passes through:

Co-ordinates	Country, territory or sea	Notes
90°0′N 127°0′W	Arctic Ocean	
75°43′N 127°0′W	Beaufort Sea	
71°12′N 127°0′W	Amundsen Gulf	
70°6′N 127°0′W	Canada	Northwest Territories; Yukon — from 61°4′N 127°0′W; British Columbia — from 60°0′N 127°0′W
50°50′N 127°0′W	Queen Charlotte Strait	
50°40′N 127°0′W	Canada	British Columbia — Malcolm Island and Vancouver Island
49°51′N 127°0′W	Pacific Ocean	
60°0′S 127°0′W	Southern Ocean	
73°41′S 127°0′W	Antarctica	Unclaimed territory

== See also ==
- 126th meridian west
- 128th meridian west
