= Hecate Island =

Island in British Columbia, Canada

Coordinates: 51°41′N 128°1′W

Hecate Island is an island on the British Columbia Coast, Canada, located between Queen Charlotte Sound and Fitz Hugh Sound to the north of Calvert Island. It has an area of 47.78 square kilometres (18.45 sq mi). It reaches a height of 519 metres (1,703 ft).
