= Calvert Island (British Columbia) =

100 km north of Vancouver Island; has oldest human evidence in North America

Coordinates: 51°35′06″N 128°01′00″W

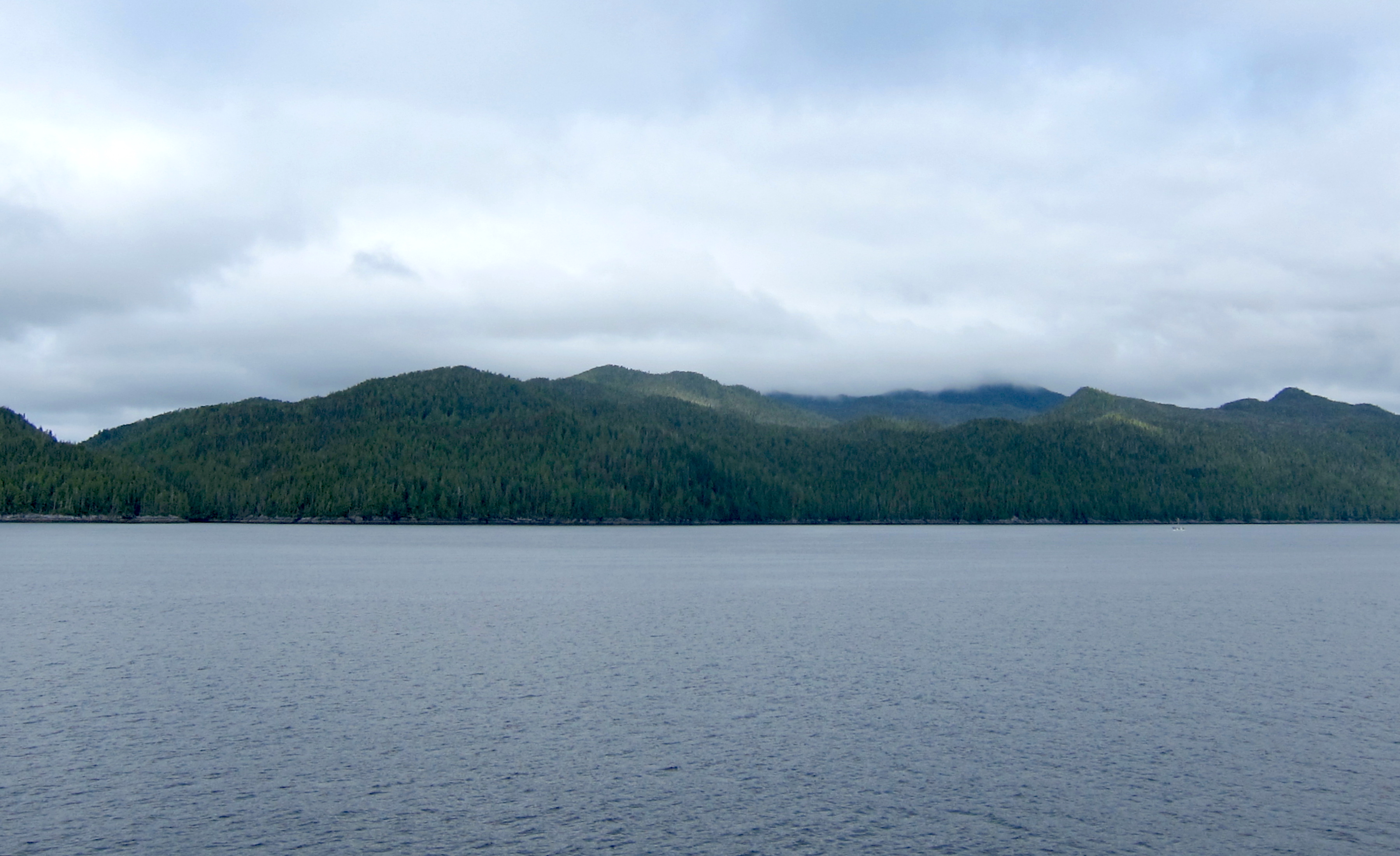
- Calvert Island from Fitz Hugh Sound

- Location in British Columbia

Geography
- Location: Queen Charlotte Sound
- Archipelago: North Coast Archipelago
- Area: 334.27 km^{2} (129.06 sq mi)
- Length: 32 km (19.9 mi)
- Width: 16 km (9.9 mi)
- Highest elevation: 1,045 m (3428 ft)
- Highest point: Mount Buxton

Administration
- Canada
- Province: British Columbia
- Regional district: Central Coast

Calvert Island is an island on the coast of the Canadian province of British Columbia. It is east of Queen Charlotte Sound in the Central Coast region, about 100 kilometres (62 mi) north of the town of Port Hardy, which is at the north end of Vancouver Island.

== Etymology ==
Calvert Island was named in 1788 by Charles Duncan, captain of the fur trading vessel Princess Royal. The name probably honors the Calvert family, and perhaps specifically Lord Cecil Calvert, second Baron of Baltimore. The name was retained by George Vancouver and published as such on his maps.

== Geography ==
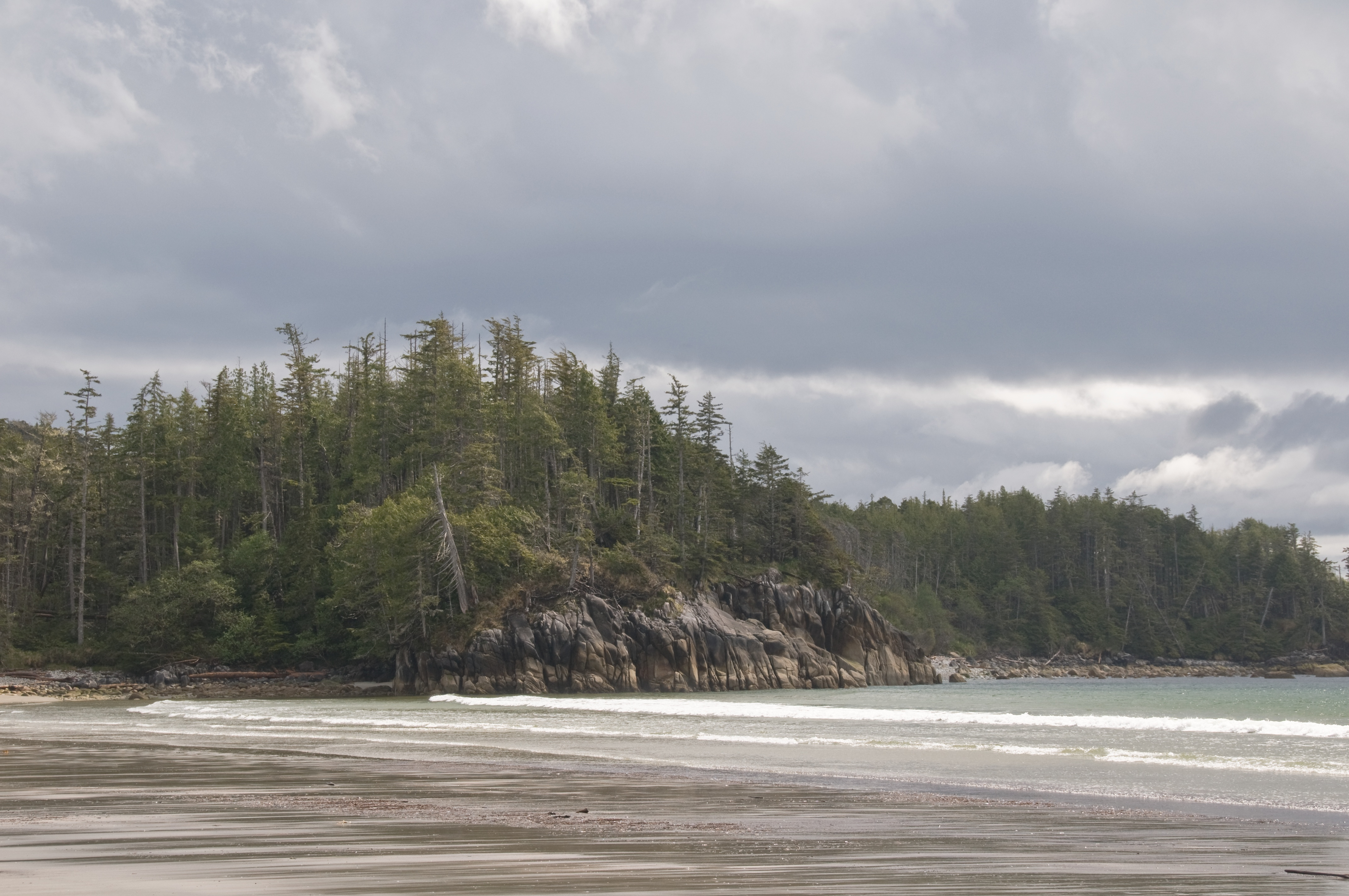
West Beach, 15 minute walk across the island from Pruth Bay at the head of Kwakshua Channel

Calvert Island is 32 kilometres (20 mi) long and ranges in width from 3 kilometres (1.9 mi) to 16 kilometres (9.9 mi). It is 334.27 square kilometres (129.06 sq mi) in area. The island reaches 1,045 metres (3,428 ft) in elevation. Hecate Island is 47.78 square kilometres (18.45 sq mi) in area.

A number of smaller islands lie just north of Calvert Island, across Kwakshua Channel, the largest of which is Hecate Island. Hakai Passage separates the islands around Calvert Island from those around Hunter Island to the north. To the east Fitz Hugh Sound, part of the Inside Passage, separates Calvert Island from the mainland. The mouth of Rivers Inlet is east of the southern end of Calvert Island.

== History ==
The traditional territory of the Heiltsuk included Calvert Island, and extended north along Dean Channel and Burke Channel, and along the coastal islands to Milbanke Sound. Archaeological evidence indicates many thousands of years of habitation in the region. In 2015, Hakai Institute and University of Victoria researchers announced that human footprints found on the island could date back 13,200 years making them the oldest known footprints in North America. The footprints are thought to represent a man, woman and child. Their discovery supports the Kelp Highway hypothesis that kelp forests along the North Pacific coast provided a route for the peopling of the Americas.

In July 1788, the British fur trader Charles Duncan arrived in the region of Calvert Island. He anchored his ship, the Princess Royal, in Milbanke Sound, then worked his way south, trading with the Heiltsuk and exploring what was then unknown waters to the British. He passed through Hakai Passage into Fitz Hugh Sound, then anchored on the east coast of Calvert Island in Safety Cove. After a brief stay he continued south to Vancouver Island.

== Protected areas ==
Just north of Calvert Island in Hakai Pass is the Hakai Lúxvbálís Conservancy area. At more than 1,200 square kilometres (300,000 acres) of land and sea, it is the largest provincial marine protected area on the British Columbia Coast.

Hakai Provincial Recreation Area, 50,707 ha in size, includes the northern part of Calvert Island and the southern part of Hunter Island, as well as numerous smaller islands in the area.

== See also ==
- Hunter Island
