= 130th meridian west =

Line of longitude

130th meridian west

The meridian 130° west of Greenwich is a line of longitude that extends from the North Pole across the Arctic Ocean, North America, the Pacific Ocean, the Southern Ocean, and Antarctica to the South Pole.

The 130th meridian west forms a great circle with the 50th meridian east.

== From Pole to Pole ==
Starting at the North Pole and heading south to the South Pole, the 130th meridian west passes through:

Co-ordinates	Country, territory or sea	Notes
90°0′N 130°0′W	Arctic Ocean	
75°17′N 130°0′W	Beaufort Sea	
70°4′N 130°0′W	Canada	Northwest Territories; Yukon — from 63°36′N 130°0′W; Northwest Territories — from 63°21′N 130°0′W; Yukon — from 63°12′N 130°0′W; British Columbia — from 60°0′N 130°0′W
55°19′N 130°0′W	United States	Alaska — for about 6 km (3.7 mi), the most easterly part of the state (in the Misty Fjords National Monument)
55°16′N 130°0′W	Canada	British Columbia — mainland, Pitt Island and Banks Island
53°12′N 130°0′W	Pacific Ocean	Passing just east of Pitcairn Island, Pitcairn Islands (at 25°4′S 130°5′W)
60°0′S 130°0′W	Southern Ocean	
74°19′S 130°0′W	Antarctica	Unclaimed territory

== See also ==
- 129th meridian west
- 131st meridian west
