= Hunter Island (British Columbia) =

Island on the coast of British Columbia, Canada

Coordinates: 51°57′N 128°0′W

Hunter Island is an island on the coast of the Canadian province of British Columbia. It is located inshore from Queen Charlotte Sound, about 130 kilometres (81 mi) north of the town of Port Hardy at the north end of Vancouver Island.

A number of small islands lie to the south of Hunter Island, including Stirling Island and Nalau Island. South of these, across Hakai Passage, is Calvert Island. To the east Fitz Hugh Sound, part of the Inside Passage, separates Hunter Island from the mainland and King Island, which is mostly within the inland reaches of Dean Channel, one of the largest coastal fjords. Queens Sound lies to the west, between Hunter Island and the Goose Group archipelago. Also on the west side of Hunter Island is Cultus Sound, so named because it is the most treacherous of the three approaches to Bella Bella (cultus means "bad" or "worthless" in the Chinook Jargon). To the southwest is Kildidt Sound. To the north Hunter Island is separated from Denny Island by Lama Passage, and from Campbell Island by Hunter Channel. Fitz Hugh Sound and Lama Pass are part of the main Inside Passage route.

Hunter Island is 34 kilometres (21 mi) long and ranges in width from 5 kilometres (3.1 mi) to 16 kilometres (9.9 mi). It is 334 square kilometres (129 sq mi) in area. The island reaches 899 metres (2,949 ft) in elevation.

== Protected areas ==
Just south of Hunter Island in Hakai Pass is the Hakai Lúxvbálís Conservancy area. At more than 1,200 square kilometres (300,000 acres) of land and sea, it is the largest provincial marine protected area on the British Columbia coast.

Hakai Provincial Recreation Area, 50,707 ha in size, includes the southern part of Hunter Island and the northern part of Calvert Island, as well as numerous smaller islands in the area.
