= 53rd meridian east =

Line of longitude

53rd meridian east

The meridian 53° east of Greenwich is a line of longitude that extends from the North Pole across the Arctic Ocean, Europe, Asia, the Indian Ocean, the Southern Ocean, and Antarctica to the South Pole.

The 53rd meridian east forms a great circle with the 127th meridian west.

== From Pole to Pole ==
Starting at the North Pole and heading south to the South Pole, the 53rd meridian east passes through:

Co-ordinates	Country, territory or sea	Notes
90°0′N 53°0′E	Arctic Ocean	
80°23′N 53°0′E	Russia	Hooker Island, Franz Josef Land
80°8′N 53°0′E	Barents Sea	
72°53′N 53°0′E	Russia	Yuzhny Island and Mezhdusharskiy Island, Novaya Zemlya
71°0′N 53°0′E	Barents Sea	Pechora Sea
68°47′N 53°0′E	Russia	
51°29′N 53°0′E	Kazakhstan	
42°7′N 53°0′E	Turkmenistan	Passing through the Garabogazköl lake Passing just east of Türkmenbaşy
40°0′N 53°0′E	Caspian Sea	Krasnovodsk Gulf
39°49′N 53°0′E	Turkmenistan	An island
39°47′N 53°0′E	Caspian Sea	Passing just west of the island of Ogurja Ada, Turkmenistan
36°47′N 53°0′E	Iran	
27°7′N 53°0′E	Persian Gulf	
24°8′N 53°0′E	United Arab Emirates	Emirate of Abu Dhabi
22°53′N 53°0′E	Saudi Arabia	
19°20′N 53°0′E	Oman	
16°53′N 53°0′E	Yemen	
16°37′N 53°0′E	Indian Ocean	Gulf of Aden
12°10′N 53°0′E	Yemen	Island of Samhah
12°9′N 53°0′E	Indian Ocean	Passing through the Amirante Islands, Seychelles
60°0′S 53°0′E	Southern Ocean	
65°56′S 53°0′E	Antarctica	Australian Antarctic Territory, claimed by Australia

== See also ==
- 52nd meridian east
- 54th meridian east
