= 50th meridian east =

Line of longitude

50th meridian east

The meridian 50° east of Greenwich is a line of longitude that extends from the North Pole across the Arctic Ocean, Europe, Asia, Africa, the Indian Ocean, Madagascar, the Southern Ocean, and Antarctica to the South Pole.

The 50th meridian east forms a great circle with the 130th meridian west.

== From Pole to Pole ==
Starting at the North Pole and heading south to the South Pole, the 50th meridian east passes through:

Co-ordinates	Country, territory or sea	Notes
90°0′N 50°0′E	Arctic Ocean	
80°55′N 50°0′E	Russia	Island of Zemlya Georga, Franz Josef Land
80°30′N 50°0′E	Barents Sea	Nightingale Channel
80°13′N 50°0′E	Russia	Bruce Island (Franz Josef Land)
80°3′N 50°0′E	Barents Sea	Passing just west of Northbrook Island, Russia
69°18′N 50°0′E	Russia	Island of Kolguyev
68°56′N 50°0′E	Barents Sea	
68°5′N 50°0′E	Russia	
51°15′N 50°0′E	Kazakhstan	
46°35′N 50°0′E	Caspian Sea	Passing just west of the Mangyshlak Peninsula, Kazakhstan
40°35′N 50°0′E	Azerbaijan	Absheron peninsula, passing just east of Baku
40°20′N 50°0′E	Caspian Sea	
37°25′N 50°0′E	Iran	
30°13′N 50°0′E	Persian Gulf	
26°49′N 50°0′E	Saudi Arabia	Passing just west of Dammam (at 26°26′N 50°6′E)
18°39′N 50°0′E	Yemen	
14°51′N 50°0′E	Indian Ocean	Gulf of Aden
11°30′N 50°0′E	Somalia	
8°6′N 50°0′E	Indian Ocean	
13°21′S 50°0′E	Madagascar	
15°46′S 50°0′E	Indian Ocean	
16°43′S 50°0′E	Madagascar	Île Sainte-Marie
16°45′S 50°0′E	Indian Ocean	Passing just west of the Western Group of the Crozet Islands, French Southern and Antarctic Lands
60°0′S 50°0′E	Southern Ocean	
67°4′S 50°0′E	Antarctica	Australian Antarctic Territory, claimed by Australia

== See also ==
- 49th meridian east
- 51st meridian east
