= Cultus Sound =

Sound on the coast of British Columbia, Canada

- Coordinates: 51°54′00″N 128°13′00″W
- Type: Sound

Cultus Sound is a sound on the Central Coast of British Columbia, Canada, located on the west side of Hunter Island and just inshore from Queen Charlotte Sound. Its name is derived from the Chinook Jargon term cultus, meaning "bad" or "worthless", which is a reference to it being the most treacherous of the three approaches to the port of Bella Bella.
