= List of Canadian airports by location indicator: CB =

Nav Canada certified airports

This is a list of all Nav Canada certified and registered water and land airports, aerodromes and heliports in the Provinces and territories of Canada sorted by location identifier.

They are listed in the format:

- Location indicator – IATA – Airport name (alternate name) – Airport location

== CB – Canada – CAN ==
Also see airport category and list.

TC LID	IATA	Airport name	Community	Province or territory
CBA3		Kincolith Water Aerodrome	Ging̱olx	British Columbia
CBA6		Bala/Muskoka Float Flying Club Water Aerodrome	Bala	Ontario
CBA7		Petrolia/Butler Airfield	Petrolia	Ontario
CBA8		Beaverley Airport	Beaverley	British Columbia
CBA9		Ospika Airport	Ospika	British Columbia
CBB2		Stouffville Aerodrome	Stouffville	Ontario
CBB3		Lake Muskoka/Boyd Bay Water Aerodrome	Bracebridge (Lake Muskoka)	Ontario
CBB4		Beddis Beach Heliport	Beddis Beach	British Columbia
CBB5		Port Alice (Hospital) Heliport	Port Alice	British Columbia
CBB8		Sainte-Barbe Heliport	Sainte-Barbe	Quebec
CBB9		Osoyoos Airport	Osoyoos	British Columbia
CBBC	ZEL	Bella Bella (Campbell Island) Airport	Bella Bella	British Columbia
CBC2		Ford Bay Airport	Ford Bay, Great Bear Lake	Northwest Territories
CBC3		Alert Bay Water Aerodrome	Alert Bay	British Columbia
CBC4		Kamloops (Royal Inland Hospital) Heliport	Kamloops	British Columbia
CBC6		Calgary/Blue Con Heliport	Calgary	Alberta
CBC7		Vancouver/Harbour (Public) Heliport	Vancouver	British Columbia
CBC8		Tofino (General Hospital) Heliport	Tofino	British Columbia
CBD6		Nahanni Butte Airport	Nahanni Butte	Northwest Territories
CBD8		Black Diamond/Flying R Ranch Aerodrome	Black Diamond	Alberta
CBD9		White Saddle Ranch Heliport	White Saddle Ranch	British Columbia
CBE2		Elko/Lionel P. Demers Memorial Airpark	Elko	British Columbia
CBE4		Cordova Mines/Belmont Lake Water Aerodrome	Cordova Mines (Belmont Lake)	Ontario
CBE6		Kirkfield/Balsam Lake (Erlandson) Water Aerodrome	Kirkfield (Balsam Lake)	Ontario
CBE7		Alliford Bay Water Aerodrome	Alliford Bay	British Columbia
CBE8		Moose Lake (Lodge) Water Aerodrome	Moose Lake	British Columbia
CBE9	YWS	Whistler (Municipal) Heliport	Whistler	British Columbia
CBF2		Belwood (Baird Field) Aerodrome	Belwood	Ontario
CBF3		Beeton Field Aerodrome	Beeton	Ontario
CBF5		Mayne Island (Medical Emergency) Heliport	Mayne Island	British Columbia
CBF6		Prince Rupert/Seal Cove (Public) Heliport	Prince Rupert	British Columbia
CBF7		Victoria Harbour (Camel Point) Heliport	Victoria	British Columbia
CBF8		Muncho Lake/Mile 462 Water Aerodrome	Muncho Lake	British Columbia
CBF9		Mabel Lake Airport	Mabel Lake	British Columbia
CBG2		Green Lake Aerodrome	Green Lake	British Columbia
CBG3		Bracebridge (Goltz Farm) Aerodrome	Bracebridge	Ontario
CBG4		Kirkfield/Balsam Lake (Grand Island) Water Aerodrome	Kirkfield (Balsam Lake)	Ontario
CBG5		Nanaimo (Regional Hospital) Heliport	Nanaimo	British Columbia
CBG6		Henderson/Big Gull Lake Water Aerodrome	Henderson (Big Gull Lake)	Ontario
CBG9		Courtenay Airpark Water Aerodrome	Courtenay	British Columbia
CBH2		Helmet Airport	Helmet	British Columbia
CBH4		Prairie Creek Airport	Prairie Creek	Northwest Territories
CBH5		Straffordville/Bushhawk Creek Aerodrome	Straffordville	Ontario
CBH7		Benalto/Hillman's Farm Aerodrome	Benalto	Alberta
CBI2		Eaglesham/Bice Farm Aerodrome	Eaglesham	Alberta
CBI3		Burleigh Falls/Breeze Island Water Aerodrome	Burleigh Falls	Ontario
CBJ4		Echo Valley Airport	Echo Valley	British Columbia
CBJ8		Fraser Lake Water Aerodrome	Fraser Lake	British Columbia
CBK4		Vancouver (General Hospital) Heliport	Vancouver	British Columbia
CBK5		Port Alberni (West Coast General Hospital) Heliport	Port Alberni	British Columbia
CBK6		Quesnel Lake Airport	Quesnel Lake	British Columbia
CBK7		Toad River/Mile 422 (Alaska Highway) Airport	Toad River	British Columbia
CBK8		Victoria (Royal Jubilee Hospital) Heliport	Victoria	British Columbia
CBK9		Little Parker Island Heliport	Little Parker Island	British Columbia
CBL2		Severn Bridge/Buck Lake Water Aerodrome	Severn Bridge	Ontario
CBL3		Fort Nelson/Gordon Field Airport	Fort Nelson	British Columbia
CBL4		Bassano (Health Centre) Heliport	Bassano	Alberta
CBL5		Montreal River Harbour/Bluearth Bow Lake Windfarm Heliport	Montreal River	Ontario
CBL6		Radium Hot Springs Airport	Radium Hot Springs	British Columbia
CBL7		Cortes Island Heliport	Cortes Island	British Columbia
CBL8		Bala Aerodrome	Bala	Ontario
CBL9		Elkin Creek Guest Ranch Airport	Elkin Creek Guest Ranch	British Columbia
CBM2		Blackstock/Martyn Aerodrome	Blackstock	Ontario
CBM3		Bruce Mines/Kerr Field Aerodrome	Bruce Mines	Ontario
CBM4		Collingwood (Blue Mountain) Heliport	Collingwood	Ontario
CBM6		Midway Aerodrome	Midway	British Columbia
CBM7		Banff Mineral Springs (Hospital) Heliport	Banff	Alberta
CBM9		Port McNeill (Hospital) Heliport	Port McNeill	British Columbia
CBN2		Bonnyville Health Centre Heliport	Bonnyville	Alberta
CBN3		Buffalo Narrows (Fire Centre) Heliport	Buffalo Narrows	Saskatchewan
CBN4		Masset Water Aerodrome	Masset	British Columbia
CBN9		Tsay Keh Airport	Tsay Keh	British Columbia
CBP2		Banff (Park Compound) Heliport	Banff	Alberta
CBP3		Fernie (Elk Valley Hospital) Heliport	Fernie	British Columbia
CBP4		Sechelt (Sechelt Hospital) Heliport	Sechelt	British Columbia
CBP5		Lillooet (Blackcomb) Heliport	Lillooet	British Columbia
CBP7		Lake Scugog/Ball Point (Smith) Water Aerodrome	Little Britain (Lake Scugog)	Ontario
CBQ2		Fort Langley Airport	Fort Langley	British Columbia
CBQ7		Kemess Creek Airport	Kemess Mine	British Columbia
CBQ8		Woodcock Airport	Woodcock	British Columbia
CBQ9		Nanaimo/Quennell Lake Water Aerodrome	Quennell Lake	British Columbia
CBR2		Kaslo Airport	Kaslo	British Columbia
CBR3		Kisbey/Brigden Field Aerodrome	Kisbey	Saskatchewan
CBR4		Brebeuf Lake/The Beuf Water Aerodrome	Gogama	Ontario
CBR7	YAZ	Tofino Lifeboat Station Heliport	Tofino	British Columbia
CBR8		Prince Rupert (Hospital) Heliport	Prince Rupert	British Columbia
CBR9		Bottrel/Anchor 9 Ranch Aerodrome	Bottrel	Alberta
CBS2		Estevan (Blue Sky) Aerodrome	Estevan	Saskatchewan
CBS3		Bonadventure (H. Stever) Heliport	Bonaventure	Quebec
CBS4		Mule Creek Airport	Mule Creek	British Columbia
CBS5		Port Hardy (Hospital) Heliport	Port Hardy	British Columbia
CBS7		Briercrest South Airport	Briercrest	Saskatchewan
CBS8	YPB	Port Alberni (Alberni Valley Regional) Airport	Port Alberni	British Columbia
CBS9		Blairmore (Crowsnest Pass Hospital) Heliport	Blairmore	Alberta
CBT2		Wiarton/Beattie Lake Water Aerodrome	Wiarton	Ontario
CBT3		Tsetzi Lake (Pan Phillips) Airport	Tsetzi Lake	British Columbia
CBT5		Golden (Golden & District General Hospital) Heliport	Golden	British Columbia
CBT9		Port Alberni/Sproat Lake Tanker Base Heliport	Port Alberni	British Columbia
CBV5		Belleville (QHC) Heliport	Belleville	Ontario
CBV7		Valemount (Yellowhead Helicopters) Heliport	Valemount	British Columbia
CBV8		Comox Valley Hospital Heliport	Comox	British Columbia
CBW2		Kitimat Airport	Kitimat	British Columbia
CBW3		Fort Grahame Airport	Fort Grahame	British Columbia
CBW4	YBO	Bob Quinn Lake Airport	Bob Quinn Lake	British Columbia
CBW5		Sarnia (Bluewater Health) Heliport	Sarnia	Ontario
CBW7		Victoria (General Hospital) Heliport	Victoria	British Columbia
CBW8		Baldwin West Aerodrome	Baldwin	Ontario
CBW9		Madrona Bay Heliport	Madrona	British Columbia
CBX5		Tungsten (Cantung) Airport	Tungsten	Northwest Territories
CBX7		Tumbler Ridge Airport	Tumbler Ridge	British Columbia
CBY2		Edmonton/Bailey Heliport	Sherwood Park	Alberta
CBY5		Prince Rupert/Seal Cove (Coast Guard) Heliport	Prince Rupert	British Columbia
CBY6		Green Lake Water Aerodrome	Green Lake	British Columbia
CBZ2		Kemano Heliport	Kemano	British Columbia
CBZ7		Victoria Harbour (Shoal Point) Heliport	Victoria	British Columbia
CBZ9		Fraser Lake Airport	Fraser Lake	British Columbia
