= List of airports in British Columbia =

British Columbia

This is a list of airports in British Columbia. It includes all Nav Canada certified and registered water and land airports, aerodromes and heliports in the Canadian province of British Columbia. Airport names in italics are part of the National Airports System.

== List of airports and heliports ==
The list is sorted by the name of the community served; click the sort buttons in the table header to switch listing order.

Community	Airport name	PU PR MI	AOE (Note: An airport of entry has four different categories. An AOE which can accept "all classes of scheduled and non-scheduled aircraft (passenger and cargo)." An AOE/# which can handle aircraft in the previous category but up to maximum number. This number can be exceeded if done in stages as shown in parentheses. An AOE/15 that can accept general aviation aircraft with a maximum of 15 passengers. An AOE/CAN which can handle aircraft subject to the CANPASS regulations.)	Operator	Elevation	ICAO	TC LID	IATA	Image	Coordinates
Abbotsford	Abbotsford International Airport	PU	15	City of Abbotsford	194 ft (59 m)	CYXX		YXX		49°01′31″N 122°21′38″W
Abbotsford	Abbotsford (Regional Hospital & Cancer Centre) Heliport	PR		Abbotsford Regional Hospital and Cancer Centre	287 ft (87 m)		CAB5			49°02′10″N 122°18′51″W
Abbotsford	Abbotsford (Sumas Mountain) Heliport	PR		Hydra Helicopters	1,067 ft (325 m)		CSM7			49°06′18″N 122°11′51″W
Abbotsford	Abbotsford (Teck) Heliport	PR		Tecklenair Aciation	165 ft (50 m)		CTK8			49°07′37″N 122°23′41″W
Agamemnon Channel	Garden Bay/Sakinaw Lake South Water Aerodrome	PR		M Aidelbaum	20 ft (6.1 m)		CAS8			49°39′13″N 124°03′50″W
Alert Bay	Alert Bay Airport	PU		Corporation of Village of Alert Bay	240 ft (73 m)	CYAL		YAL		50°34′56″N 126°54′57″W
Alert Bay	Alert Bay Water Aerodrome	PU		Corporation of Village of Alert Bay	0 ft (0 m)		CBC3			50°35′00″N 126°56′00″W
Alliford Bay	Alliford Bay Water Aerodrome	PU		Oak Bay Marine Group	0 ft (0 m)		CBE7			53°12′54″N 131°59′28″W
Anahim Lake	Anahim Lake Airport	PU		Cariboo Regional District	3,644 ft (1,111 m)		CAJ4	YAA		52°27′08″N 125°18′16″W
Atlin	Atlin Airport	PU	15	Atlin District Airport Association	2,381 ft (726 m)	CYSQ				59°34′36″N 133°40′08″W
Atlin	Atlin Water Aerodrome	PU	15 / SEA	Atlin District Airport Association	2,190 ft (670 m)		CAD6			59°34′16″N 133°42′38″W
Bamfield	Bamfield Water Aerodrome	PR		Pacific Seaplanes	0 ft (0 m)		CAE9			48°49′30″N 125°08′13″W
Beaverley	Beaverley Airport	PU		Cyr's Recreational Aviation Park	2,420 ft (740 m)		CBA8			53°51′20″N 122°54′27″W
Beddis Beach	Beddis Beach Heliport	PR		Pat and Rosemarie Keough	171 ft (52 m)		CBB4			48°48′00″N 123°25′25″W
Bedwell Harbour	Bedwell Harbour Water Aerodrome	PR	15 / SEA	Canada Border Services Agency	0 ft (0 m)		CAB3			48°45′00″N 123°14′00″W
Bella Bella	Bella Bella (Campbell Island) Airport	PU		Heiltsuk Economic Development Corp	141 ft (43 m)		CBBC	ZEL		52°11′06″N 128°09′24″W
Bella Bella	Bella Bella/Waglisla Water Aerodrome	PU		Transport Canada	0 ft (0 m)		CAR9			52°10′00″N 128°08′00″W
Bella Coola	Bella Coola Airport	PU		Central Coast Regional District	117 ft (36 m)	CYBD		QBC		52°23′15″N 126°35′45″W
Big Bay	Big Bay Water Aerodrome	PU		Stuart Island Community Association	0 ft (0 m)		CAF6			50°24′00″N 125°08′00″W
Blind Channel	Blind Channel Water Aerodrome	PU		Blind Channel Trading Company	0 ft (0 m)		CAG6			50°25′00″N 125°30′00″W
Blue River	Blue River Airport	PR		Cariboo Helicopter Skiing (Mike Wiegele Helicopter Skiing)	2,265 ft (690 m)	CYCP		YCP		52°07′27″N 119°17′33″W
Bob Quinn Lake	Bob Quinn Lake Airport	PU		Bob Quinn Lake Airport Society	1,970 ft (600 m)		CBW4	YBO		56°58′00″N 130°15′00″W
Burns Lake	Burns Lake Airport	PU		Airport Society	2,343 ft (714 m)	CYPZ		YPZ		54°22′35″N 125°57′05″W
Burns Lake	Burns Lake (LD Air) Water Aerodrome	PU		Lakes District Air Services	2,300 ft (700 m)		CLD3			54°12′37″N 125°45′27″W
Cache Creek	Cache Creek Airport	PU		Village of Cache Creek	2,040 ft (620 m)		CAZ5			50°47′00″N 121°19′00″W
Camp Cordero	Camp Cordero Water Aerodrome	PU		Camp Cordero	0 ft (0 m)		CAK6			50°27′00″N 125°28′00″W
Campbell River	Campbell River Airport	PU	15	City of Campbell River	357 ft (109 m)	CYBL		YBL		49°57′07″N 125°16′23″W
Campbell River	Campbell River (Campbell River & District Hospital) Heliport	PR		Island Health	282 ft (86 m)		CAT6			50°00′31″N 125°14′34″W
Campbell River	Campbell River (Graham Air Limited) Heliport	PR		Graham Air Limited	7 ft (2.1 m)		CCR6			50°02′30″N 125°16′30″W
Campbell River	Campbell River (Sealand Aviation) Heliport	PR		Sealand Aviation	357 ft (109 m)		CSL4			49°57′03″N 125°15′51″W
Campbell River	Campbell River Water Aerodrome (Campbell River Harbour Airport)	PR	15 / SEA	Corilair Charters	0 ft (0 m)		CAE3	YBL		50°03′00″N 125°15′00″W
Castlegar	West Kootenay Regional Airport (Castlegar Airport)	PU	CANPASS	City of Castlegar	1,626 ft (496 m)	CYCG		YCG		49°17′47″N 117°37′57″W
Castlegar	Castlegar (Tarrys Convention Centre) Heliport	PR		Tarrys Convention Centre	1,630 ft (500 m)		CCT3			49°23′10″N 117°33′09″W
Chetwynd	Chetwynd Airport	PU		District of Chetwynd	1,999 ft (609 m)	CYCQ		YCQ		55°41′14″N 121°37′36″W
Chilliwack	Chilliwack Airport	PU		Magnum Management Inc.	32 ft (9.8 m)	CYCW		YCW		49°09′12″N 121°56′21″W
Coal Harbour	Coal Harbour Water Aerodrome	PU		Coal Harbour Investments	0 ft (0 m)		CAQ3			50°36′00″N 127°35′00″W
Comox	CFB Comox (Comox Airport)	MI / PU	AOE/M; 15	DND / Comox Valley Airport Commission (Note: Airport terminal only)	84 ft (26 m)	CYQQ		YQQ		49°42′39″N 124°53′12″W
Comox	Comox Valley Hospital Heliport	PR		Island Health	357 ft (109 m)		CBV8			49°42′44″N 124°58′10″W
Comox	Comox Water Aerodrome	PU		Comox Valley Marina	0 ft (0 m)		CCX6			49°40′14″N 124°55′57″W
Cortes Island	Cortes Island Aerodrome	PR		M. Ching	164 ft (50 m)		CCI9	YCF		50°01′25″N 124°59′03″W
Cortes Island	Cortes Island Heliport	PR		Cortes Island Fire Department	230 ft (70 m)		CBL7			50°03′31″N 124°58′54″W
Courtenay	Courtenay Airpark	PU	CANPASS	Courtenay Airpark Association	9 ft (2.7 m)		CAH3	YCA		49°40′46″N 124°58′54″W
Courtenay	Courtenay Airpark Water Aerodrome	PU	CANPASS	Courtenay Airpark Association	0 ft (0 m)		CBG9			49°40′53″N 124°58′53″W
Courtenay	Courtenay (Smit Field) Airport	PR		Dan Annand	500 ft (150 m)		CCS6			49°40′00″N 125°06′00″W
Cranbrook	Cranbrook/Canadian Rockies International Airport	PU	15	Elevate Airports Inc.	3,084 ft (940 m)	CYXC		YXC		49°36′44″N 115°46′55″W
Cranbrook	Cranbrook (East Kootenay Regional Hospital) Heliport	PR		Interior Health Authority	3,061 ft (933 m)		CAE2			49°30′42″N 115°44′59″W
Creston	Creston Aerodrome	PU	CANPASS	Creston Valley Regional Airport Society	2,094 ft (638 m)		CAJ3			49°02′12″N 116°29′53″W
Daajing Giids	Queen Charlotte City Water Aerodrome	PU		Queen Charlotte City Harbour Authority	0 ft (0 m)		CAQ6			53°15′00″N 132°04′00″W
Dawson Creek	Dawson Creek Airport	PU		City of Dawson Creek	2,147 ft (654 m)	CYDQ		YDQ		55°44′32″N 120°10′59″W
Dawson Creek	Dawson Creek (Flying L Ranch) Airport	PR		Rod Foster	2,680 ft (820 m)		CDC3			55°49′14″N 120°27′10″W
Dease Lake	Dease Lake Airport	PU		Stikine Airport Society	2,634 ft (803 m)	CYDL		YDL		58°25′20″N 130°01′56″W
Delta	Boundary Bay Airport (Vancouver/Boundary Bay Airport)	PU	15	Alpha Aviation Inc.	6 ft (1.8 m)	CZBB		YDT		49°04′24″N 123°00′30″W
Delta	Delta Heritage Air Park	PR		Recreational Aircraft Association, Chapter 85 (Delta Heritage Airpark Operating Committee, DAPCOM)	10 ft (3.0 m)		CAK3			49°04′25″N 122°56′28″W
Denny Island	Denny Island Aerodrome	PU		Denny Island Airport Commission c/o Central Coast Regional District	162 ft (49 m)	CYJQ				52°08′23″N 128°03′49″W
Douglas Lake	Douglas Lake Airport	PR		Douglas Lake Cattle Company	2,700 ft (820 m)		CAL3			50°10′00″N 120°11′00″W
Duncan	Duncan Airport	PU	CANPASS	Duncan Flying Club	300 ft (91 m)		CAM3	DUQ		48°45′17″N 123°42′35″W
Duncan	Duncan (Cowichan District Hospital) Heliport	PR		Island Health	131 ft (40 m)		CDH4			48°47′10″N 123°43′17″W
Echo Valley	Echo Valley Airport	PR		Echo Valley Ranch and SPA	3,650 ft (1,110 m)		CBJ4			51°14′30″N 121°59′39″W
Elkford	Elkford Heliport	PR		District of Elkford	4,298 ft (1,310 m)		CEH7			50°00′25″N 114°55′23″W
Elkin Creek Guest Ranch	Elkin Creek Guest Ranch Airport	PR		Elkin Creek Guest Ranch	4,080 ft (1,240 m)		CBL9			51°30′46″N 123°48′16″W
Elko	Elko/Lionel P. Demers Memorial Airpark	PU		Bob Cutts; Crowsnest Owners & Pilots Society	2,850 ft (870 m)		CBE2			49°17′00″N 115°09′00″W
Fairmont Hot Springs	Fairmont Hot Springs Airport	PU		Columbia Valley Airport Society	2,661 ft (811 m)	CYCZ		YCZ		50°19′49″N 115°52′24″W
Fernie	Fernie (Elk Valley Hospital) Heliport	PR		Interior Health District	3,299 ft (1,006 m)		CBP3			49°30′46″N 115°03′22″W
Fort Grahame	Fort Grahame Airport	PU		Finlay River Outfitters; Jody Mcauley	2,230 ft (680 m)		CBW3			56°31′18″N 124°28′06″W
Fort Langley	Fort Langley Airport	PR		Fort Langley Aviation	30 ft (9.1 m)		CBQ2			49°10′04″N 122°33′27″W
Fort Langley	Fort Langley Water Aerodrome	PR	CANPASS	Fort Langley Aviation	10 ft (3.0 m)		CAS4			49°10′00″N 122°32′00″W
Fort Nelson	Fort Nelson Airport	PU		Northern Rockies Regional Municipality	1,253 ft (382 m)	CYYE		YYE		58°50′14″N 122°36′05″W
Fort Nelson	Fort Nelson/Gordon Field Airport	PR		Ken or Rod Rombough	1,625 ft (495 m)		CBL3			58°49′00″N 122°47′00″W
Fort Nelson	Fort Nelson (Parker Lake) Water Aerodrome	PR		Liard Air	1,255 ft (383 m)		CER9			58°50′00″N 122°54′00″W
Fort St. John	Fort St. John Airport (North Peace Airport)	PU		North Peace Airport Services	2,280 ft (690 m)	CYXJ		YXJ		56°14′17″N 120°44′25″W
Fort St. James	Fort St. James (Perison) Airport	PU		District of Fort St. James	2,364 ft (721 m)	CYJM		YJM		54°23′50″N 124°15′46″W
Fort St. James	Fort St. James (Stuart Lake Hospital) Heliport	PR		Stuart Lake Hospital Maintenance	2,362 ft (720 m)		CFJ2			54°26′27″N 124°14′33″W
Fort St. James	Fort St. James/Stuart River Water Aerodrome	PR		Tsayta Aviation	2,230 ft (680 m)		CAZ6			54°25′00″N 124°16′00″W
Fraser Lake	Fraser Lake Airport	PU		Village of Fraser Lake	2,690 ft (820 m)		CBZ9			54°00′48″N 124°46′06″W
Fraser Lake	Fraser Lake Water Aerodrome	PR		Danish Aviation	2,205 ft (672 m)		CBJ8			54°04′00″N 124°53′00″W
Galore Creek mine	Galore Creek Heliport	PR		Galore Creek Mining Corporation	2,601 ft (793 m)		CGC2			57°07′24″N 131°27′09″W
Ganges	Ganges (Lady Minto/Gulf Islands Hospital) Heliport	PR		Island Health	148 ft (45 m)		CAL7			48°51′45″N 123°30′31″W
Ganges	Ganges Water Aerodrome	PR		Salt Spring Harbour Authority	0 ft (0 m)		CAX6	YGG		48°51′00″N 123°30′00″W
Gilford Island	Gilford Island/Echo Bay Water Aerodrome	PU		Echo Bay Resort	0 ft (0 m)		CAA7			50°46′00″N 126°29′00″W
Gilford Island	Gilford Island/Health Bay Water Aerodrome	PU		Transport Canada	0 ft (0 m)		CAD7			50°42′00″N 126°36′00″W
Ging̱olx	Kincolith Water Aerodrome	PR		Gingolx Development Corporation	0 ft (0 m)		CBA3			55°00′00″N 129°57′00″W
Gold River	Gold River (49 North Helicopters) Heliport	PR		49 North Helicopters	182 ft (55 m)		CGR2			49°45′11″N 126°03′19″W
Gold River	Gold River (The Ridge) Heliport	PR		The Ridge Neighbourhood Pub	480 ft (150 m)		CGR4			49°47′00″N 126°02′37″W
Gold River	Gold River Water Aerodrome	PU		Village of Gold River; Air Nootka	0 ft (0 m)		CAU6			49°41′00″N 126°07′00″W
Golden	Golden Airport	PU		Town of Golden	2,576 ft (785 m)	CYGE		YGE		51°17′57″N 116°58′57″W
Golden	Golden (Golden & District General Hospital) Heliport	PR		Golden & District General Hospital	2,585 ft (788 m)		CBT5			51°17′49″N 116°58′01″W
Grand Forks	Grand Forks Airport	PU	CANPASS	City of Grand Forks	1,724 ft (525 m)	CZGF		ZGF		49°00′56″N 118°25′50″W
Grand Forks	Grand Forks (Boundary Hospital) Heliport	PR		Boundary Hospital	1,741 ft (531 m)		CGF4			49°01′50″N 118°28′12″W
Green Lake	Green Lake Aerodrome	PR		Flying U Guest Ranch	3,550 ft (1,080 m)		CBG2			51°25′46″N 121°12′35″W
Green Lake	Green Lake Water Aerodrome	PR		Flying U Guest Ranch	3,507 ft (1,069 m)		CBY6			51°25′19″N 121°12′51″W
Gun Lakes	Gun Lake Heliport	PR		Blackcomb Aviation	2,950 ft (900 m)		CGL5			50°53′23″N 122°50′48″W
Harrison Hot Springs	Harrison Hot Springs Water Aerodrome	PU		Village of Harrison Hot Springs	34 ft (10 m)		CAE7			49°18′17″N 121°47′15″W
Hartley Bay	Hartley Bay Water Aerodrome	PU		Transport Canada	0 ft (0 m)		CAY4	YTB		53°25′00″N 129°15′00″W
Helmet	Helmet Airport	PR		Canadian Natural Resources	1,930 ft (590 m)		CBH2			59°25′33″N 120°47′51″W
Hope	Hope Aerodrome	PU		Fraser Valley Regional District	128 ft (39 m)	CYHE		YHE		49°22′06″N 121°29′53″W
Houston	Houston Aerodrome	PU		District of Houston	2,150 ft (660 m)		CAM5			54°26′00″N 126°47′00″W
Hudson's Hope	Hudson's Hope Airport	PU		District of Hudson's Hope	2,220 ft (680 m)	CYNH		YNH		56°02′08″N 121°58′33″W
Ingenika	Ingenika Airport	PU		Tsay Keh Dene Band	2,230 ft (680 m)		CAP6			56°47′26″N 124°53′48″W
Invermere	Invermere Airport	PU		Babin Air	2,820 ft (860 m)		CAA8			50°31′00″N 116°00′00″W
Invermere	Invermere (District Hospital) Heliport	PR		Interior Health Authority	2,766 ft (843 m)		CIV2			50°30′26″N 116°01′57″W
Kamloops	Kamloops Airport	PU	30	Kamloops Airport Limited	1,133 ft (345 m)	CYKA		YKA		50°42′09″N 120°26′55″W
Kamloops	Kamloops (Royal Inland Hospital) Heliport	PR		Interior Health Authority	1,453 ft (443 m)		CBC4			50°40′09″N 120°19′59″W
Kamloops	Kamloops Water Aerodrome	PU	15 / SEA	Kamloops Airport Limited	1,129 ft (344 m)		CAH7			50°42′00″N 120°26′00″W
Kaslo	Kaslo Airport	PR		Village of Kaslo	2,354 ft (717 m)		CBR2			49°54′13″N 116°56′07″W
Kelowna	Kelowna International Airport	PU	215	City of Kelowna	1,420 ft (430 m)	CYLW		YLW		49°57′22″N 119°22′40″W
Kelowna	Kelowna (Alpine) Heliport	PR		Alpine Helicopters	1,597 ft (487 m)		CAB7			49°51′50″N 119°34′07″W
Kelowna	Kelowna (Argus) Heliport	PR		Argus Properties	1,877 ft (572 m)		CRG2			49°57′41″N 119°26′46″W
Kelowna	Kelowna (General Hospital) Heliport	PR		Interior Health Authority	1,230 ft (370 m)		CKH9			49°52′27″N 119°29′33″W
Kelowna	Kelowna/Ikon Adventures Heliport	PR		Ikon Adventures	1,122 ft (342 m)		CIA2			49°52′51″N 119°31′21″W
Kelowna	Kelowna (Valhalla) Heliport	PR		Valhalla Helicopters	1,539 ft (469 m)		CVA3			49°52′04″N 119°33′38″W
Kelowna	Kelowna (Wildcat Helicopters) Heliport	PR		Wildcat Helicopters	1,640 ft (500 m)		CWC2			49°52′03″N 119°34′45″W
Kemano	Kemano Heliport	PR		Rio Tinto Alcan	160 ft (49 m)		CBZ2			53°34′00″N 127°57′00″W
Kemess Mine	Kemess Creek Airport	PR		AuRico Gold Inc., Kemess Mine	4,191 ft (1,277 m)		CBQ7			56°58′28″N 126°44′28″W
Kitimat	Kitimat Airport	PU		Kitimat Flying Club	250 ft (76 m)		CBW2			54°09′50″N 128°34′51″W
Kitkatla	Kitkatla Water Aerodrome	PU		The Gitxaala Nation	0 ft (0 m)		CAP7	YKK		53°48′00″N 130°26′00″W
Kwadacha	Fort Ware Airport	PU		Fort Ware Indian Band Council	2,520 ft (770 m)		CAJ9			57°25′50″N 125°39′10″W
Kwadacha	Fort Ware Water Aerodrome	PU		Fort Ware Indian Band Council	2,445 ft (745 m)		CAW6			57°25′00″N 125°39′00″W
Kyuquot	Kyuquot Water Aerodrome	PU		Transport Canada	0 ft (0 m)		CAR7			50°02′00″N 127°22′00″W
Langley	Langley Regional Airport	PU	CANPASS	Township of Langley	34 ft (10 m)	CYNJ		YNJ		49°06′11″N 122°37′36″W
Lasqueti Island	Lasqueti Island/False Bay Water Aerodrome	PU		Transport Canada	0 ft (0 m)		CAT7			49°30′00″N 124°21′00″W
Likely	Likely Aerodrome	PU		Cariboo Regional District	3,225 ft (983 m)		CAX5			52°37′00″N 121°30′00″W
Lillooet	Lillooet Airport	PU		District of Lillooet	1,320 ft (400 m)	CYLI				50°40′29″N 121°53′37″W
Lillooet	Lillooet (Blackcomb) Heliport	PR		Blackcomb Helicopters	752 ft (229 m)		CBP5			50°41′06″N 121°55′38″W
Little Parker Island	Little Parker Island Heliport	PR		J. Bickerstaff	22 ft (6.7 m)		CBK9			48°53′47″N 123°25′06″W
Long Harbour	Long Harbour Aerodrome	PR		Nick Budd	50 ft (15 m)		CLH3			48°51′30″N 123°28′29″W
Mabel Lake	Mabel Lake Airport	PR		Mabel Lake Golf and Airpark	1,410 ft (430 m)		CBF9			50°36′32″N 118°43′52″W
Mackenzie	Mackenzie Airport	PR		District of Mackenzie	2,265 ft (690 m)	CYZY		YZY		55°17′58″N 123°08′00″W
Madrona	Madrona Bay Heliport	PR		I. Levin	35 ft (11 m)		CBW9			48°51′21″N 123°29′08″W
Mansons Landing	Mansons Landing Water Aerodrome	PU		Harbour Authority of Cortes Island	0 ft (0 m)		CAV7			50°04′17″N 124°59′01″W
Masset	Masset Airport	PU		Village of Masset	19 ft (5.8 m)	CZMT		ZMT		54°01′38″N 132°07′30″W
Masset	Masset Water Aerodrome	PU		Village of Masset	0 ft (0 m)		CBN4			54°01′00″N 132°09′00″W
Mayne Island	Mayne Island (Medical Emergency) Heliport	PR		Mayne Island Fire Department	100 ft (30 m)		CBF5			48°50′48″N 123°17′03″W
McBride	McBride/Charlie Leake Field Aerodrome	PU		Village of McBride	2,367 ft (721 m)		CAV4			53°18′53″N 120°10′11″W
Merritt	Merritt Airport]] (Saunders Field)	PU		City of Merritt	2,085 ft (636 m)		CAD5	YMB		50°07′22″N 120°44′42″W
Midway	Midway Aerodrome	PU		Village of Midway	1,896 ft (578 m)		CBM6			49°00′36″N 118°47′23″W
Moose Lake	Moose Lake (Lodge) Airport	PR		Moose Lake Lodge	3,500 ft (1,100 m)		CAS2			53°04′24″N 125°24′33″W
Moose Lake	Moose Lake (Lodge) Water Aerodrome	PR		Moose Lake Lodge	3,500 ft (1,100 m)		CBE8			53°04′33″N 125°24′02″W
Mount Belcher	Mount Belcher Heliport	PR		Don Arney	1,000 ft (300 m)		CMBH			48°49′58″N 123°30′19″W
Mule Creek	Mule Creek Airport	PU		Government of Yukon	2,900 ft (880 m)		CBS4			59°46′29″N 136°35′41″W
Muncho Lake	Muncho Lake/Mile 462 Water Aerodrome	PR		Northern Rockies Lodge	2,681 ft (817 m)		CBF8			59°00′36″N 125°46′26″W
Nakusp	Nakusp Airport	PU		Village of Nakusp	1,681 ft (512 m)		CAQ5			50°16′00″N 117°48′47″W
Nakusp	Nakusp (Arrow Lakes Hospital) Heliport	PR		Interior Health Authority	1,515 ft (462 m)		CAL2			50°14′18″N 117°47′43″W
Nanaimo	Nanaimo Airport	PU	200 (300)	Nanaimo Airport Commission	92 ft (28 m)	CYCD		YCD		49°03′08″N 123°52′13″W
Nanaimo	Nanaimo Boat Harbour Heliport	PR		Mike Moore	180 ft (55 m)		CMM3			49°11′09″N 123°58′18″W
Nanaimo	Nanaimo/Gabriola Island (Health Clinic) Heliport	PR		Gabriola Health Care Foundation (Gabriola Fire Department)	321 ft (98 m)		CGB4			49°10′42″N 123°50′07″W
Nanaimo	Nanaimo Harbour Heliport	PR		Pacific Heliport Services	12 ft (3.7 m)		CDH5			49°09′39″N 123°55′24″W
Nanaimo Harbour	Nanaimo Harbour Water Aerodrome	PU		Nanaimo Port Authority; Seair Seaplanes	0 ft (0 m)		CAC8	ZNA		49°11′00″N 123°57′00″W
Nanaimo	Nanaimo (Regional Hospital) Heliport	PR		Island Health	293 ft (89 m)		CBG5			49°11′09″N 123°58′18″W
Naramata	Naramata Heliport	PR		Finnair	1,872 ft (571 m)		CNM6			49°36′10″N 119°34′43″W
Nelson	Nelson Airport	PU		City of Nelson	1,755 ft (535 m)	CZNL				49°29′39″N 117°18′02″W
Nelson	Nelson/Blaylock Estate Heliport	PR		Brent Ironside	1,830 ft (560 m)	CYB3				49°32′41″N 117°15′38″W
Nelson	Nelson Water Aerodrome	PU		City of Nelson	1,740 ft (530 m)		CAD8			49°30′00″N 117°18′00″W
Nelson	Nelson (High Terrain Helicopters) Heliport	PR		High Terrain Helicopters	1,950 ft (590 m)		CHT4			49°29′12″N 117°19′38″W
New Denver	New Denver/Slocan Community (Health Centre) Heliport	PR		Interior Health Authority	1,770 ft (540 m)		CND7			49°59′03″N 117°22′28″W
Nimpo Lake	Nimpo Lake Water Aerodrome	PR		Stewarts Lodge/Tweedsmuir Air Service	3,665 ft (1,117 m)		CAF8			52°20′00″N 125°09′00″W
Ocean Falls	Ocean Falls Water Aerodrome	PU		Ocean Falls Improvement District	0 ft (0 m)		CAH2	ZOF		52°22′00″N 127°43′00″W
Oie Lake	Oie Lake/Dougall Campbell Field Aerodrome	PR		D. Stead	3,060 ft (930 m)		CDC5			52°00′39″N 121°12′40″W
Oliver	Oliver Municipal Airport	PU		Town of Oliver	1,015 ft (309 m)		CAU3			49°10′24″N 119°33′04″W
100 Mile House	100 Mile House Airport	PU		The District of 100 Mile House	3,055 ft (931 m)		CAV3			51°38′33″N 121°18′25″W
108 Mile Ranch	South Cariboo Regional Airport (108 Mile Ranch Airport)	PU		Cariboo Regional District	3,129 ft (954 m)	CZML		ZMH		51°44′10″N 121°19′58″W
Osoyoos	Osoyoos Airport	PU		Town of Osoyoos	1,100 ft (340 m)		CBB9			49°02′14″N 119°29′20″W
Ospika	Ospika Airport	PU		Finlay River Outfitters	2,353 ft (717 m)		CBA9			56°16′15″N 124°03′50″W
Parksville	Parksville (Ascent Helicopters) Heliport	PR		Ascent Helicopters	261 ft (80 m)		CAH5			49°18′42″N 124°22′13″W
Pemberton	Pemberton Regional Airport	PU		Village of Pemberton	670 ft (200 m)	CYPS				50°18′09″N 122°44′16″W
Pender Harbour	Pender Harbour Water Aerodrome	PU		Pender Harbour Authority	0 ft (0 m)		CAG8	YPT		49°37′00″N 124°01′00″W
Penticton	Penticton Regional Airport	PU	30 (120)	Transport Canada	1,130 ft (340 m)	CYYF		YYF		49°27′45″N 119°36′08″W
Penticton	Penticton Regional Hospital Heliport	PR		Interior Health Authority	1,356 ft (413 m)		CPH6			49°28′54″N 119°34′34″W
Pitt Meadows	Pitt Meadows Regional Airport	PU	15	Pitt Meadows Airport Society	12 ft (3.7 m)	CYPK		YPK		49°12′58″N 122°42′48″W
Pitt Meadows	Pitt Meadows Water Aerodrome	PU		Pitt Meadows Airport Society	6 ft (1.8 m)		CAJ8			49°12′34″N 122°42′34″W
Port Alberni	Port Alberni (Alberni Valley Regional) Airport	PU		Regional District Alberni-Clayoquot	247 ft (75 m)		CBS8	YPB		49°19′16″N 124°55′46″W
Port Alberni	Port Alberni/Sproat Lake Tanker Base Heliport	PR		Couldon Flying Tankers	103 ft (31 m)		CBT9			49°17′24″N 124°56′42″W
Port Alberni (Sproat Lake)	Port Alberni/Sproat Lake Landing Water Aerodrome	PR		Pacific Seaplanes & Sproat Lake Landing resort	95 ft (29 m)		CSP4			49°17′05″N 124°58′25″W
Port Alberni (Sproat Lake)	Port Alberni/Sproat Lake Water Aerodrome	PU		Couldon Flying Tankers	95 ft (29 m)		CAA9			49°17′00″N 124°57′00″W
Port Alberni	Port Alberni Water Aerodrome	PU		Pacific Seaplanes	0 ft (0 m)		CPW9			49°14′08″N 124°49′03″W
Port Alberni	Port Alberni (West Coast General Hospital) Heliport	PR		Island Health	273 ft (83 m)		CBK5			49°14′56″N 124°46′59″W
Port Alice	Port Alice (Hospital) Heliport	PR		Port Alice Hospital	50 ft (15 m)		CBB5			50°25′36″N 127°29′13″W
Port Hardy	Port Hardy Airport	PU	15	Transport Canada	71 ft (22 m)	CYZT		YZT		50°40′50″N 127°22′00″W
Port Hardy	Port Hardy (Hospital) Heliport	PR		Island Health	137 ft (42 m)		CBS5			50°43′15″N 127°30′11″W
Port Hardy	Port Hardy Water Aerodrome	PU		Legend Air; Wilderness Seaplanes	0 ft (0 m)		CAW5			50°43′00″N 127°29′00″W
Port McNeill	Port McNeill Airport	PU		Town of Port McNeill	225 ft (69 m)		CAT5	YMP		50°34′32″N 127°01′43″W
Port McNeill	Port McNeill (Hospital) Heliport	PR		Island Health	280 ft (85 m)		CBM9			50°34′54″N 127°04′01″W
Port McNeill	Port McNeill Water Aerodrome	PU		Mid Coast Properties	0 ft (0 m)		CAM8			50°35′00″N 127°06′00″W
Port Renfrew	Port Renfrew (Mill Bay Marine Group) Heliport	PR		Mill Bay Marine Group	11 ft (3.4 m)		CMB9			48°33′21″N 124°24′52″W
Powell Lake	Powell Lake Water Aerodrome	PU		City of Powell River	183 ft (56 m)		CAQ8	WPL		49°53′06″N 124°32′38″W
Powell River	Powell River Airport	PU		City of Powell River	415 ft (126 m)	CYPW		YPW		49°50′03″N 124°30′01″W
Powell River	Powell River (Qathet General Hospital) Heliport	PR		Vancouver Coastal Health	297 ft (91 m)		CPW8			49°51′05″N 124°31′02″W
Prince George	Prince George Airport	PU	30 (120)	Prince George Airport Authority	2,266 ft (691 m)	CYXS		YXS		53°53′03″N 122°40′39″W
Prince Rupert	Prince Rupert Airport	PU	15	Prince Rupert Airport Authority	116 ft (35 m)	CYPR		YPR		54°17′10″N 130°26′41″W
Prince Rupert	Prince Rupert/Digby Island Water Aerodrome	PU		Prince Rupert Airport Authority	0 ft (0 m)		CAN6			54°19′00″N 130°24′00″W
Prince Rupert	Prince Rupert (Hospital) Heliport	PR		Northern Health Authority	268 ft (82 m)		CBR8			54°18′19″N 130°19′48″W
Prince Rupert	Prince Rupert/Seal Cove (Coast Guard) Heliport	PR		Coast Guard	17 ft (5.2 m)		CBY5			54°19′54″N 130°16′36″W
Prince Rupert	Prince Rupert/Seal Cove (Public) Heliport	PU		Seal Cove Airport Society	17 ft (5.2 m)		CBF6			54°19′47″N 130°16′45″W
Prince Rupert	Prince Rupert/Seal Cove Water Aerodrome	PU	15 / SEA	Seal Cove Airport Society	0 ft (0 m)	CZSW		ZSW		54°20′00″N 130°17′00″W
Princeton	Princeton Aerodrome	PU		Town of Princeton	2,302 ft (702 m)	CYDC				49°28′05″N 120°30′41″W
Puntzi Mountain	Puntzi Mountain Airport	PU		Ministry of Forests, Lands and Natural Resource Operations Provincial Airtanker Centre	2,985 ft (910 m)	CYPU		YPU		52°06′46″N 124°08′41″W
Qualicum Beach	Qualicum Beach Airport	PU		Town of Qualicum Beach	190 ft (58 m)		CAT4	XQU		49°20′14″N 124°23′38″W
Qualicum Beach	Qualicum Beach (Aerosmith Heli Service) Heliport	PR		Aerosmith Heli Service	292 ft (89 m)		CAS5			49°18′25″N 124°24′48″W
Quamichan Lake	Quamichan Lake (Raven Field) Airport	PR		John Howroyd	130 ft (40 m)		CML2			48°48′43″N 123°39′02″W
Quamichan Lake	Quamichan Lake (Raven Field) Water Aerodrome	PR		John F Howroyd	100 ft (30 m)		CRF6			48°48′30″N 123°39′00″W
Quennell Lake	Nanaimo/Quennell Lake Water Aerodrome	PR		Zuiderzee Campsites	122 ft (37 m)		CBQ9			49°04′39″N 123°49′50″W
Quesnel	Quesnel Airport	PU		City of Quesnel	1,788 ft (545 m)	CYQZ		YQZ		53°01′34″N 122°30′37″W
Quesnel Lake	Quesnel Lake Airport	PR		Elysia Resort	2,500 ft (760 m)		CBK6			52°30′54″N 121°02′42″W
Radium Hot Springs	Radium Hot Springs Airport	PR		E. Hirschfeld	2,650 ft (810 m)		CBL6			50°38′00″N 116°06′00″W
Revelstoke	Revelstoke (Queen Victoria Hospital) Heliport	PR		Queen Victoria Hospital	1,549 ft (472 m)		CQV3			50°58′40″N 118°11′22″W
Rivers Inlet	Rivers Inlet Water Aerodrome	PU		Transport Canada	0 ft (0 m)		CAU8	YRN		51°41′00″N 127°15′00″W
Ross Creek	Ross Creek Aerodrome	PR		Ross Creek Landing	1,260 ft (380 m)		CRC3			50°57′57″N 119°13′32″W
Salmon Arm	Salmon Arm Airport	PU		City of Salmon Arm	1,751 ft (534 m)	CZAM		YSN		50°40′58″N 119°13′43″W
Sandspit	Sandspit Airport	PU		Transport Canada	21 ft (6.4 m)	CYZP		YZP		53°15′15″N 131°48′50″W
Sechelt / Gibsons	Sechelt Aerodrome	PU		District of Sechelt	311 ft (95 m)		CAP3			49°27′38″N 123°43′07″W
Sechelt	Sechelt (Sechelt Hospital) Heliport	PR		Vancouver Coastal Health	179 ft (55 m)		CBP4			49°28′34″N 123°44′54″W
Seymour Arm	Seymour Arm Aerodrome	PU		Seymor Airstrip	1,150 ft (350 m)		CSM4			51°14′33″N 118°56′59″W
Shawnigan Lake	Shawnigan Lake (Elie Acres) Heliport	PR		Banyan Properties	1,010 ft (310 m)		CLE3			48°33′46″N 123°36′10″W
Shawnigan Lake	Shawnigan Lake Water Aerodrome	PR		Galley Marina	380 ft (120 m)		CAV8			48°38′00″N 123°38′00″W
Shearwater	Bella Bella/Shearwater Water Aerodrome	PU		Shearwater Marine	0 ft (0 m)		CAW8	YSX		52°09′00″N 128°05′00″W
Sicamous	Sicamous/Owls Landing Heliport	PR		Guy Maris	1,394 ft (425 m)		COL4			50°48′39″N 115°58′13″W
Smithers	Smithers Airport	PU		Town of Smithers	1,717 ft (523 m)	CYYD		YYD		54°49′31″N 127°10′58″W
Smithers	Smithers (Canadian) Heliport	PR		Canadian Helicopters	1,600 ft (490 m)		CAA6			54°46′30″N 127°08′06″W
Smithers	Smithers/Tyhee Lake Water Aerodrome	PU		Alpine Lakes Air	1,640 ft (500 m)		CAX8			54°43′00″N 127°03′00″W
Sonora Island	Sonora Resort Heliport	PR		London Enterprises	46 ft (14 m)		CSR6			50°22′54″N 125°09′27″W
Sparwood	Sparwood/Elk Valley Airport	PU		Regional District of East Kootenay	3,853 ft (1,174 m)	CYSW				49°50′06″N 114°52′43″W
Spout Lake	Spout Lake Water Aerodrome	PU		Ten-ee-ah Lodge	3,560 ft (1,090 m)		CSU6			52°00′27″N 121°26′41″W
Springhouse	Springhouse Airpark	PU		Springhouse Airpark Society	3,250 ft (990 m)		CAQ4	YSE		51°57′20″N 122°08′22″W
Squamish	Squamish Airport	PU		District of Squamish	171 ft (52 m)	CYSE		ZST		49°46′54″N 123°09′43″W
Stewart	Stewart Aerodrome	PU		District of Stewart	24 ft (7.3 m)	CZST				55°56′00″N 129°59′00″W
Stewart	Stewart Water Aerodrome	PU		District of Stewart	0 ft (0 m)		CAC9			55°55′00″N 130°00′00″W
Sullivan Bay	Sullivan Bay Water Aerodrome	PU		Broughton Island Ventures	0 ft (0 m)		CAV5	YTG		50°53′08″N 126°49′37″W
Surge Narrows Provincial Park	Surge Narrows Water Aerodrome	PU		Strathcona Regional District	0 ft (0 m)		CAG9			50°13′00″N 125°07′00″W
Tahsis	Tahsis Water Aerodrome	PU		The Village of Tahsis	0 ft (0 m)		CAL9			49°55′24″N 126°39′17″W
Takla Landing	Takla Landing Water Aerodrome	PU		Takla Trading Post	2,260 ft (690 m)		CAZ3			55°30′00″N 125°59′00″W
Telegraph Creek	Telegraph Creek Water Aerodrome	PR		Graham Air	1,100 ft (340 m)		CAH9	YXT		57°54′00″N 131°11′00″W
Terrace / Kitimat	Northwest Regional Airport Terrace-Kitimat (Terrace Airport)	PU		Terrace-Kitimat Airport Society	713 ft (217 m)	CYXT		YGB		54°28′07″N 128°34′42″W
Texada Island	Texada/Gillies Bay Airport	PU		Regional District of Powell River	326 ft (99 m)	CYGB				49°41′39″N 124°31′04″W
Toad River	Toad River/Mile 422 (Alaska Highway) Airport	PR		Toad River Community Club	2,400 ft (730 m)		CBK7			58°50′58″N 125°14′24″W
Tofino	Tofino (General Hospital) Heliport	PR		Island Health	60 ft (18 m)		CBC8			49°09′04″N 125°54′33″W
Tofino Harbour	Tofino Harbour Water Aerodrome	PR		Tofino Airlines	0 ft (0 m)		CAB4			49°09′15″N 125°54′34″W
Tofino	Tofino Lifeboat Station Heliport	PR		Canadian Coast Guard	10 ft (3.0 m)		CBR7	YAZ		49°09′16″N 125°54′07″W
Tofino	Tofino-Long Beach Airport	PU		Alberni-Clayoquot Regional District Airport	80 ft (24 m)	CYAZ				49°04′55″N 125°46′21″W
Trail	Trail Airport	PU	CANPASS	City of Trail	1,427 ft (435 m)		CAD4			49°03′36″N 117°36′29″W
Trail	Trail (Kootenay Boundary Regional Hospital) Heliport	PR		Interior Health Authority	1,526 ft (465 m)		CKB3			49°06′13″N 117°42′01″W
Tsay Keh	Tsay Keh Airport	PU		Tsay Keh Dene Band	2,285 ft (696 m)		CBN9			56°54′25″N 124°57′58″W
Tsetzi Lake	Tsetzi Lake (Pan Phillips) Airport	PR		Pan Phillips Fishing Resort	3,550 ft (1,080 m)		CBT3			52°58′19″N 125°01′36″W
Tŝilhqox Biny	Chilko Lake (Tsylos Park Lodge) Aerodrome	PR		Tsylos Park Lodge & Adventures	3,850 ft (1,170 m)		CAG3	CJH		51°37′34″N 124°08′31″W
Tŝilhqox Biny	Chilko Lake (Wilderness Lodge) Aerorome	PR		Chilko Lake Air Services	4,064 ft (1,239 m)		CCL6			51°39′57″N 124°08′40″W
Tsuniah Lake Lodge	Tsuniah Lake Lodge Airport	PR		Tsuniah Lake Lodge	4,000 ft (1,200 m)		CAF4			51°32′00″N 124°10′00″W
Tumbler Ridge	Tumbler Ridge Airport	PU		District of Tumbler Ridge	3,060 ft (930 m)		CBX7			55°01′30″N 120°56′05″W
Ucluelet	Ucluelet Water Aerodrome	PR		District of Ucluelet	0 ft (0 m)		CAN3			48°57′00″N 125°33′00″W
Valemount	Valemount Airport	PU		Village of Valemount	2,616 ft (797 m)		CAH4			52°51′10″N 119°20′11″W
Valemount	Valemount (CMH) Heliport	PR		Canadian Mountain Holidays	2,711 ft (826 m)		CMH6			52°47′18″N 119°15′24″W
Valemount	Valemount (Yellowhead Helicopters) Heliport	PR		Yellowhead Helicopters	2,600 ft (790 m)		CBV7			52°51′59″N 119°17′49″W
Vancouver	Vancouver International Airport	PU	AOE, AOE/CARGO, 25 (Note: Small aircraft)	Vancouver International Airport Authority	13 ft (4.0 m)	CYVR		YVR		49°11′41″N 123°10′57″W
Vancouver	Vancouver International Water Airport	PU	15 / SEA	Vancouver International Airport Authority; Seair Seaplanes	0 ft (0 m)		CAM9			49°10′37″N 123°10′15″W
Vancouver	Vancouver (Children & Women's Health Centre) Heliport	PR		Provincial Health Services Authority	239 ft (73 m)		CAK7			49°14′38″N 123°07′38″W
Vancouver	Vancouver/Coquitlam Fire and Rescue Heliport	PR		Coquitlam Fire and Rescue	180 ft (55 m)		CFR6			49°17′30″N 122°47′32″W
Vancouver	Vancouver (General Hospital) Heliport	PR		Vancouver Coastal Health	235 ft (72 m)		CBK4			49°15′43″N 123°07′28″W
Vancouver	Vancouver Harbour Flight Centre (Vancouver Harbour Water Airport, Vancouver Coal Harbour Seaplane Base)	PU	15 / SEA	Harbour Air, Vancouver Harbour Flight Centre	0 ft (0 m)	CYHC		CXH		49°17′40″N 123°06′41″W
Vancouver	Vancouver/Harbour (Public) Heliport	PR		Pacific Heliport Services	2 ft (0.61 m)		CBC7			49°17′13″N 123°06′22″W
New Westminster	Vancouver/New Westminster (Royal Columbian Hospital) Heliport	PR		Fraser Health Authority	238 ft (73 m)		CNW9			49°13′36″N 122°53′32″W
Surrey	Vancouver (Surrey Memorial Hospital) Heliport	PR		Fraser Health Authority	367 ft (112 m)		CVS3			49°10′33″N 122°50′38″W
Vanderhoof	Vanderhoof Airport	PU		District of Vanderhoof	2,229 ft (679 m)		CAU4			54°02′46″N 124°00′45″W
Vanderhoof	Vanderhoof Water Aerodrome	PU		Vanderhoof Flying Club	2,050 ft (620 m)		CVH3			54°01′13″N 123°59′53″W
Vernon	Vernon Regional Airport	PU		Vernon Regional Airport Corporation	1,141 ft (348 m)	CYVK		YVE		50°14′45″N 119°19′54″W
Vernon	Vernon/Wildlife Water Aerodrome	PR		Robert Lord	1,122 ft (342 m)		CVW2			50°14′37″N 119°20′40″W
Victoria	Victoria (General Hospital) Heliport	PR		Island Health	53 ft (16 m)		CBW7			48°28′05″N 123°25′56″W
Victoria	Victoria (Royal Jubilee Hospital) Heliport	PR		Island Health	51 ft (16 m)		CBK8			48°26′03″N 123°19′31″W
Victoria	Victoria Inner Harbour Airport (Victoria Harbour Water Airport)	PR	15 / SEA	Transport Canada	0 ft (0 m)	CYWH		YWH		48°25′22″N 123°23′15″W
Victoria	Victoria Harbour (Camel Point) Heliport	PR		Pacific Heliport Services	15 ft (4.6 m)		CBF7			48°25′05″N 123°23′17″W
Victoria	Victoria Harbour (Shoal Point) Heliport	PR		Canadian Coast Guard	0 ft (0 m)		CBZ7			48°25′23″N 123°23′15″W
Victoria	Victoria International Airport	PU	120 (450)	Victoria International Airport Authority	64 ft (20 m)	CYYJ		YYJ		48°38′49″N 123°25′33″W
Victoria	Victoria Airport Water Aerodrome	PU	120 (450); 15 / SEA (Note: Patricia Bay Floats)	Victoria International Airport Authority	0 ft (0 m)		CAP5			48°39′13″N 123°26′57″W
Whaletown	Whaletown Water Aerodrome	PU		Harbour Authority of Cortes Island	0 ft (0 m)		CAW9			50°06′30″N 125°03′01″W
Whistler	Whistler (Hospital) Heliport	PR		Vancouver Coastal Health	2,181 ft (665 m)		CAW4			50°07′13″N 122°57′17″W
Whistler	Whistler (Municipal) Heliport	PU		Whistler Heliport Society	2,130 ft (650 m)		CBE9	YWS		50°10′06″N 122°54′17″W
Whistler	Whistler/Green Lake Water Aerodrome	PU		Whistler Air	2,100 ft (640 m)		CAE5			50°08′37″N 122°56′57″W
White Saddle Ranch	White Saddle Ranch Heliport	PR		White Saddle Air Services	2,925 ft (892 m)		CBD9			51°44′00″N 124°44′00″W
Williams Lake	Williams Lake Airport	PU		City of Williams Lake	3,088 ft (941 m)	CYWL				52°11′00″N 122°03′16″W
Williams Lake	Williams Lake (Frontline Helicopters) Heliport	PR		Frontline Helicopters	2,679 ft (817 m)		CFH2	YWL		51°57′52″N 121°48′45″W
Winfield	Winfield (Wood Lake) Water Aerodrome	PU		Turtle Bay Marina	1,283 ft (391 m)		CAY9			50°03′00″N 119°24′00″W
Woodcock	Woodcock Airport	PU		M. Malott / R. MacKillop	357 ft (109 m)		CBQ8			55°04′00″N 128°14′00″W
Zeballos	Zeballos Water Aerodrome	PU		Village of Zeballos	0 ft (0 m)		CAA5			49°59′00″N 126°51′00″W

== Defunct airports ==
Community	Airport name	ICAO	TC LID	IATA	Coordinates
Alice Arm	Alice Arm/Silver City Water Aerodrome		CAC3		55°28′00″N 129°29′00″W
Barkerville	Barkerville Airport		CAS3		53°05′17″N 121°30′55″W
Bronson Creek	Bronson Creek Airport		CAB5		56°40′47″N 131°05′15″W
Brucejack mine	Brucejack/Bowser Aerodrome		CBB6		56°23′43″N 129°56′42″W
Shuswap Lake, Chase	Shuswap (Skwlax Field) Aerodrome		CSQ2		50°52′44″N 119°35′25″W
Chilliwack	CFB Chilliwack				49°06′11″N 121°57′46″W
Clinton	Clinton/Bleibler Ranch Aerodrome		CBR4		51°15′59″N 121°41′05″W
Crawford Bay	Crawford Bay Airport		CAR2		49°40′00″N 116°49′00″W
Dawson Creek	Dawson Creek Water Aerodrome		CBD3		55°44′42″N 120°11′00″W
Dean River	Dean River Airport			YRD	52°49′25″N 126°57′54″W
Delta	Canadian Forces Station Ladner				49°04′26″N 123°00′27″W
Dog Creek	RCAF Aerodrome - Dog Creek				51°38′00″N 122°16′00″W
Eddontenajon	Eddontenajon/Iskut Village Airport		CBU2		57°50′50″N 129°58′58″W
Esquimalt	Esquimalt Airport	CYPE		YPC	48°26′00″N 123°24′00″W
Finlay Bay	Finlay Bay Water Aerodrome		CAK8		55°58′45″N 123°46′39″W
Fort Grahame	Fort Grahame Water Aerodrome		CAU9		56°31′39″N 124°28′24″W
Fort Nelson	Fort Nelson/Mobil Sierra Airport		CBX2		58°50′05″N 121°23′34″W
Fort St. John	Fort St. John (Charlie Lake) Water Aerodrome			CEY7	56°17′00″N 120°58′00″W
Fort St. John	Fort St. John/Tompkins Mile 54 Airport		CBZ3		56°18′00″N 121°00′00″W
Gang Ranch	Gang Ranch Airport		CAY2		51°33′06″N 122°19′37″W
Kahntah	Kahntah Aerodrome		CKN3		58°02′30″N 120°54′34″W
Lax Kwʼalaams	Port Simpson Water Aerodrome		CAN8	YPI	54°34′00″N 130°26′00″W
Mayne Island	Mayne Island Water Aerodrome		CAW7		48°52′00″N 123°18′00″W
Minstrel Island	Minstrel Island Water Aerodrome		CAX7		50°37′00″N 126°19′00″W
Mission	Mission Water Aerodrome		CAY7		49°08′00″N 122°18′00″W
Nanaimo	Nanaimo/Long Lake Water Airport		CAT3		49°13′00″N 124°01′00″W
Peggo	Peggo Devon Canada Aerodrome		CPD7		59°19′08″N 120°16′38″W
Penticton	Penticton Water Aerodrome		CAH8		49°27′00″N 119°36′00″W
Poplar Beach	Poplar Beach Resort Water Aerodrome		CAG5		51°22′15″N 121°15′53″W
Port Alice	Port Alice/Rumble Beach Water Aerodrome		CAL8		50°26′00″N 127°30′00″W
Port Washington	Port Washington Water Aerodrome		CAP8		48°49′00″N 123°19′00″W
Prince George	Prince George (North Cariboo Air Park) Airport		CBW8		54°00′29″N 123°01′23″W
Quilchena	Quilchena Airport		CBT6		50°10′00″N 120°30′00″W
Richmond	Minoru Park				49°09′56″N 123°08′43″W
Rykerts	Rykerts Water Aerodrome		CBZ8		48°59′00″N 116°30′00″W
Scar Creek	Scar Creek Airport		CBA7		51°11′00″N 125°02′00″W
Scum Lake	Scum Lake Airport		CAW3		51°48′00″N 123°35′00″W
Sechelt	Sechelt/Porpoise Bay Water Aerodrome		CAX3		49°29′00″N 123°46′00″W
Surrey	Surrey/King George Airpark		CSK8	ZTS	49°05′42″N 122°49′10″W
Takla Lake	Takla Narrows Aerodrome		CBD5		55°09′52″N 125°42′15″W
Tasu	Tasu Water Aerodrome			YTU	52°45′54″N 132°02′32″W
Telegraph Creek	Telegraph Creek Airport		CBM5	YTX	57°55′00″N 131°07′00″W
Tipella	Tipella Airport		CBB7		49°44′35″N 122°09′47″W
Tofino	RCAF Station Tofino				49°04′55″N 125°46′51″W
Tsacha Lake	Tsacha Lake Airport		CAE4		53°01′00″N 124°50′00″W
Vanderhoof	Vanderhoof (District) Water Aerodrome		CAN9		54°01′00″N 124°00′00″W
Williams Lake	Williams Lake Water Aerodrome		CAC5		52°10′59″N 122°03′15″W

== See also ==
- List of airports in the Campbell River area
- List of airports in the Gulf Islands
- List of airports in the Lower Mainland
- List of airports in the Okanagan
- List of airports in the Prince Rupert area
- List of airports on Vancouver Island
- List of airports in Greater Victoria
