= List of airports in the Campbell River area =

Location in British Columbia

This is a list of airports in the Campbell River area of British Columbia, Canada:

Airport name	ICAO / TC LID / IATA	Location	Coordinates
Campbell River Airport	CYBL (YBL)	Campbell River	49°57′07″N 125°16′23″W
Campbell River (Campbell River & District Hospital) Heliport	CAT6	Campbell River	50°00′31″N 125°14′34″W
Campbell River (Graham Air Limited) Heliport	CCR6	Campbell River	50°02′30″N 125°16′30″W
Campbell River (Sealand Aviation) Heliport	CSL4	Campbell River	49°57′03″N 125°15′51″W
Campbell River Water Aerodrome (Campbell River Harbour Airport)	CAE3 (YHH)	Campbell River	50°03′00″N 125°15′00″W

== See also ==
- List of airports in the Gulf Islands
- List of airports in the Lower Mainland
- List of airports in the Okanagan
- List of airports in the Prince Rupert area
- List of airports on Vancouver Island
- List of airports in Greater Victoria
