= List of airports in Greater Victoria =

Location in British Columbia

The following active airports serve the Greater Victoria, British Columbia, Canada area:

Airport name	ICAO/TC LID/IATA	Location	Coordinates
Victoria Airport Water Aerodrome	CAP5	North Saanich	48°39′00″N 123°27′00″W
Victoria (General Hospital) Heliport	CBW7	View Royal	48°28′05″N 123°25′56″W
Victoria (Royal Jubilee Hospital) Heliport	CBK8	Victoria	48°26′03″N 123°19′31″W
Victoria Harbour (Camel Point) Heliport	CBF7	Victoria	48°25′05″N 123°23′17″W
Victoria Harbour (Shoal Point) Heliport	CBZ7	Victoria	48°25′23″N 123°23′15″W
Victoria Inner Harbour Airport (Victoria Harbour Water Airport)	CYWH (YWH)	Victoria	48°25′22″N 123°23′15″W
Victoria International Airport	CYYJ (YYJ)	North Saanich	48°38′49″N 123°25′33″W

== See also ==
- List of airports in the Gulf Islands
- List of airports in the Lower Mainland
- List of airports in the Okanagan
- List of airports in the Prince Rupert area
- List of airports on Vancouver Island
