= Pitt Meadows Regional Airport =

Pitt Meadows Regional Airport Pitt Meadows Airport
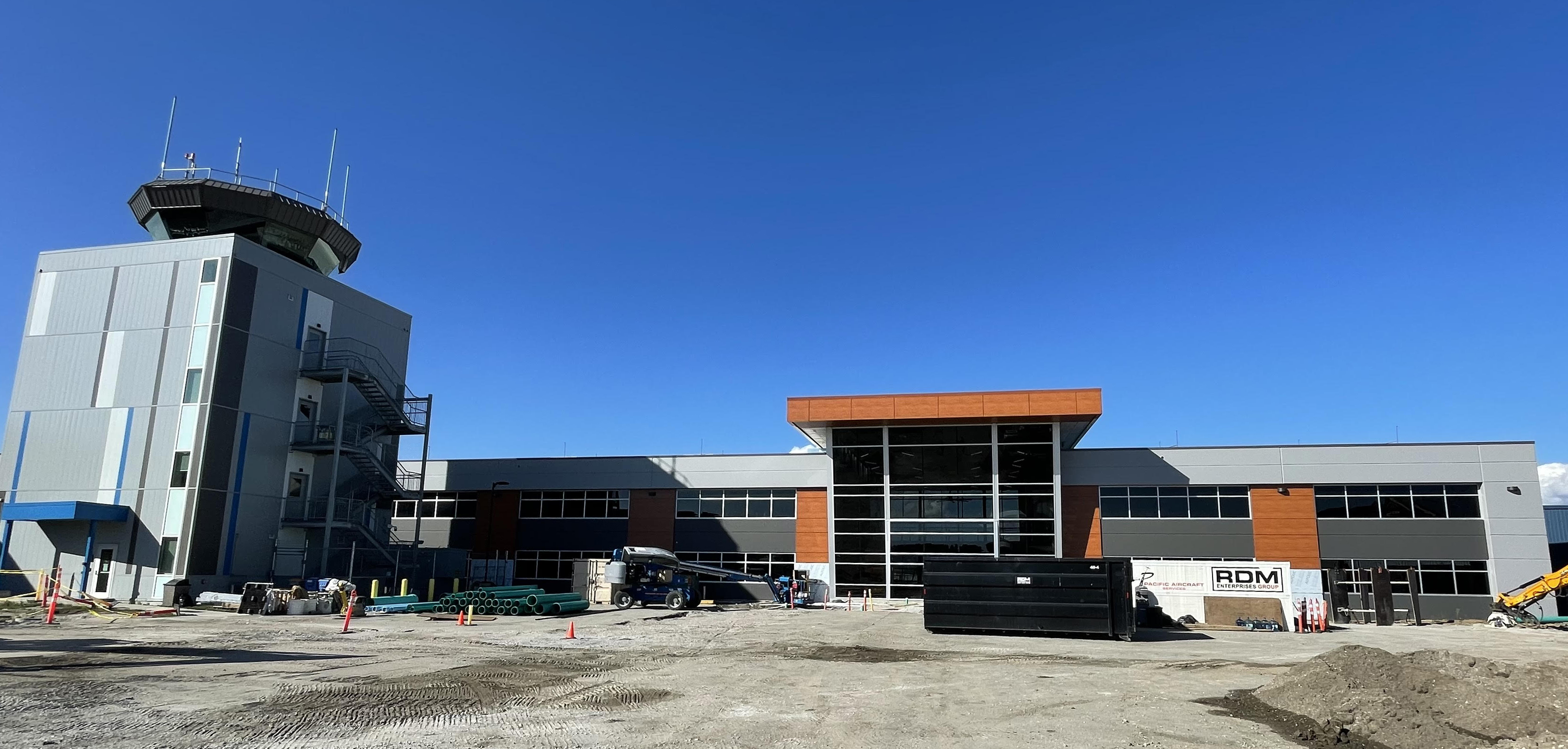
- IATA: none; ICAO: CYPK

Summary
- Airport type: Public
- Owner/Operator: Pitt Meadows Airport Society
- Serves: Metro Vancouver
- Location: Pitt Meadows, British Columbia
- Time zone: MST (UTC−07:00)
- Elevation AMSL: 12 ft (3.7 m)
- Coordinates: 49°12′58″N 122°42′48″W
- Website: www.flyypk.ca

Map
- Location in British Columbia CYPK (Canada)

Runways
Direction	Length		Surface
Direction	ft	m	Surface
08L/26R	2,485	757	Asphalt
08R/26L	5,003	1,525	Asphalt
18/36	2,484	757	Asphalt

Helipads
Number	Length		Surface
Number	ft	m	Surface
1	68 dia	21 dia	Asphalt
2	68 dia	21 dia	Asphalt
3	50 dia	15 dia	Asphalt

Statistics (2021)
- Aircraft Movements: 112,872
- Sources: Canada Flight Supplement; Movements from Statistics Canada

Pitt Meadows Regional Airport (ICAO: CYPK) is a Canadian general aviation airport located in the southwest corner of Pitt Meadows, British Columbia. In 2022, the airport had 127,284 aircraft movements, making it the 3rd busiest airport in British Columbia and the 9th busiest airport in Canada.

By 1957 the federal government planned to create a secondary airport in the Lower Mainland due to the growing demand at Vancouver International Airport. Construction began in 1962 with the Department of Transport planning to spend CA$300,000 for utilities and developing gravel and grass runways on the former farmland. On July 20th 1963, the airport officially opened, with the B.C. Aero Club moving beforehand from YVR the on June 23rd.

The first airport manager was Gordon McNeill 1966-1972. By 1972-1973, Pitt Meadows was the busiest airport in Canada with over 250,000 aircraft movements annually, but with the opening of Boundary Bay Airport in Delta, British Columbia in 1983, air traffic at Pitt Meadows Airport declined steadily.

In January 1998, the districts of Maple Ridge and Pitt Meadows jointly took custody of the airport from the federal government under the auspices of the Pitt Meadows Airport Society.

Nine flight training schools are located at the airport. The airport features three asphalt runways, three helipads, IFR approaches, and a separate float plane dock along the Fraser River. The Nav Canada air traffic control tower operates from 7:00 a.m. to 11:00 p.m. 365 days per year.

In 2019, the airport terminal was moved to make room for a new 3,700 m^{2} (40,000 ft^{2}) two-level terminal building. The new terminal opened in January 2022.

== Airlines and destinations ==
Unlike Vancouver or Abbotsford International Airport, Pitt Meadows Regional Airport offers only on-demand flights by private charter and air taxis from Western Canada; the majority of destinations are in British Columbia.

Airlines	Destinations
BC Air	Charter: Abbotsford, Courtenay, Hope, Kamloops, Kelowna, Langley, Merritt, Nanaimo, Princeton, Port Alberni, Port Hardy, Powell River, Qualicum Beach, Rivers Inlet, Squamish, Stuart Island, Tofino, Vancouver, Victoria
Canadian Flight Centre	Charter: Chilko Lake, Denny Island
Northern Rockies Adventures/Liard Air	Charter: Calgary, Fort St. John, Fort Nelson Airport, Kelowna, Prince Rupert, Tofino, Winnipeg
Van City Seaplanes	Charter: Savary Island, Hernando Island, Cortes Island, Hornby Island, Denman Island, Powell River, Campbell River, Port Alberni, Sechelt, Hornby Island, Nanaimo, Gabriola, Valdez, DeCourcy Island, Thetis Island, Saltspring Island, Galiano, Pender Island North/South, Saturna Island, Mayne, Patricia Bay, Desolation Sound, Bamfield, Ucluelet, Tofino, Harrison Hot Springs, Vancouver, Pitt Meadows, Maple Bay, Hardy Island, Blind Bay, Sakinaw Lake, Ruby Lake, Green Lake (Whistler), Cultus Lake, Widgeon Lake
Whistler Wings Aviation	Charter: Pemberton
Sky Helicopters	Charter: Vancouver

Other air charters without fixed routes include:

- Island Coastal Aviation
- Pacific Rim Aviation Academy
- Sierra Helicopters

== Flight training ==
Flight training operations include:

- Canadian Aviation College
- Canadian Flight Centre
- Cardinal Aviation
- Classic Aviation
- Executive Compass Flight Institute
- Fort Langley Air
- Island Coastal Aviation
- Montair Aviation
- Pacific Rim Aviation Academy
- Vancouver Aviation College
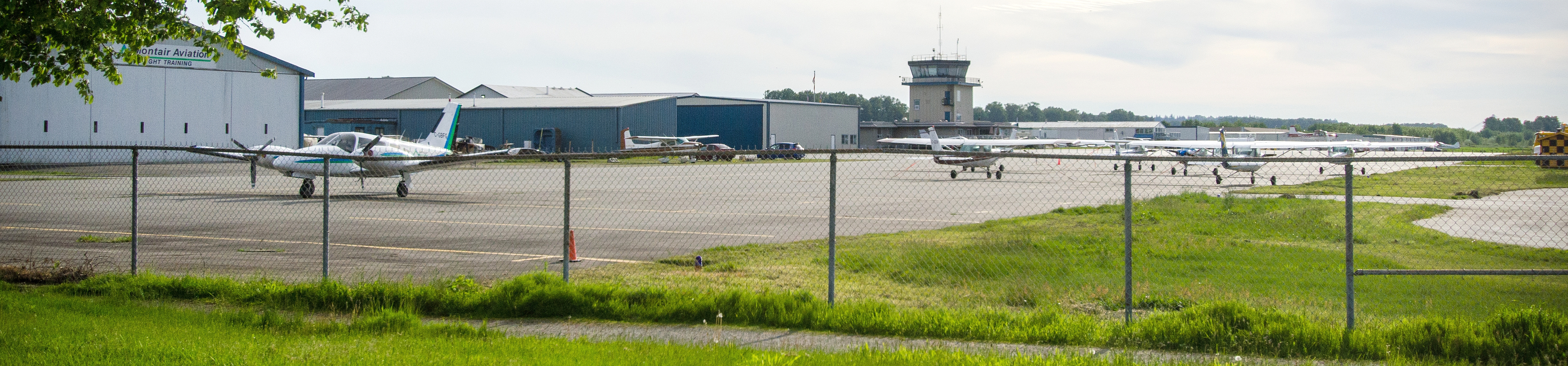
Pitt Meadows Airport in 2017, showing the pre-2022 control tower and terminal building

== See also ==
- List of airports in the Lower Mainland
