= Scum Lake (British Columbia) =

Lake in the Chilcotin region of the Interior of British Columbia, Canada

- Location of Scum Lake in British Columbia
- Location: Chilcotin District, British Columbia, Canada
- Coordinates: 51°47′09″N 123°36′09″W
- Type: Lake
- Part of: Pacific Ocean drainage basin
- Primary outflows: Haines Creek
- Max. length: 2.2 km (1.4 mi)
- Max. width: 0.6 km (0.37 mi)
- Surface elevation: 1,189 m (3,901 ft)

Scum Lake is a lake in the Chilcotin region of the Interior of British Columbia, Canada.

The major inflow, at the west, and outflow, at the northeast, is Haines Creek, which flows to the Chilcotin River near the settlement of Hanceville. The Chilcotin River flows via the Fraser River to the Pacific Ocean.

Scum Lake Airport is at the northeastern tip of the lake.

== See also ==
- List of lakes of British Columbia
