= List of airports on Vancouver Island =

Location in British Columbia

This is a list of airports on Vancouver Island, British Columbia, Canada:

== Vancouver Island beyond Greater Victoria ==
=== Land airports ===
==== Scheduled commercial airline service ====
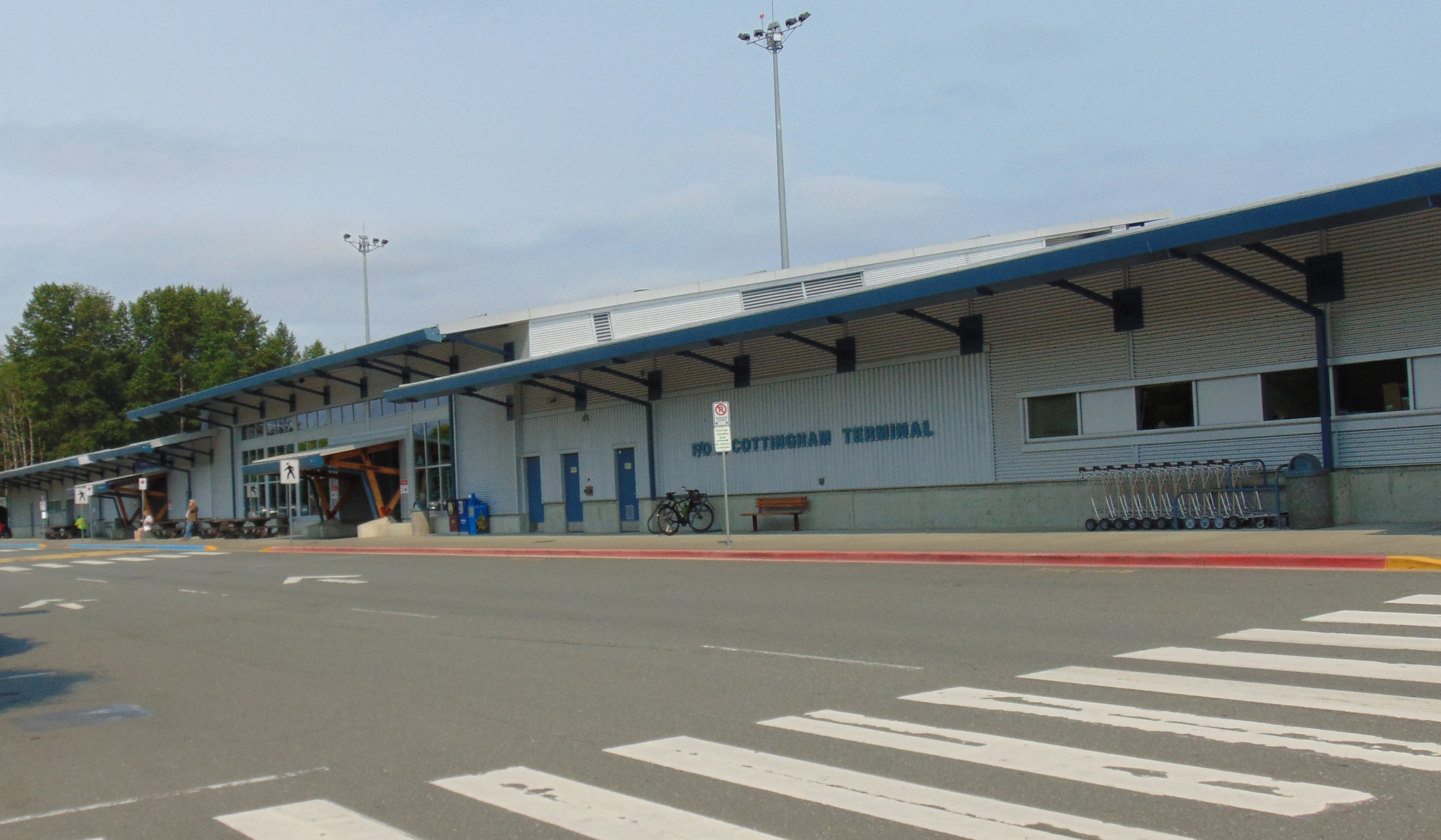
Front of the airport terminal building at CFB Comox

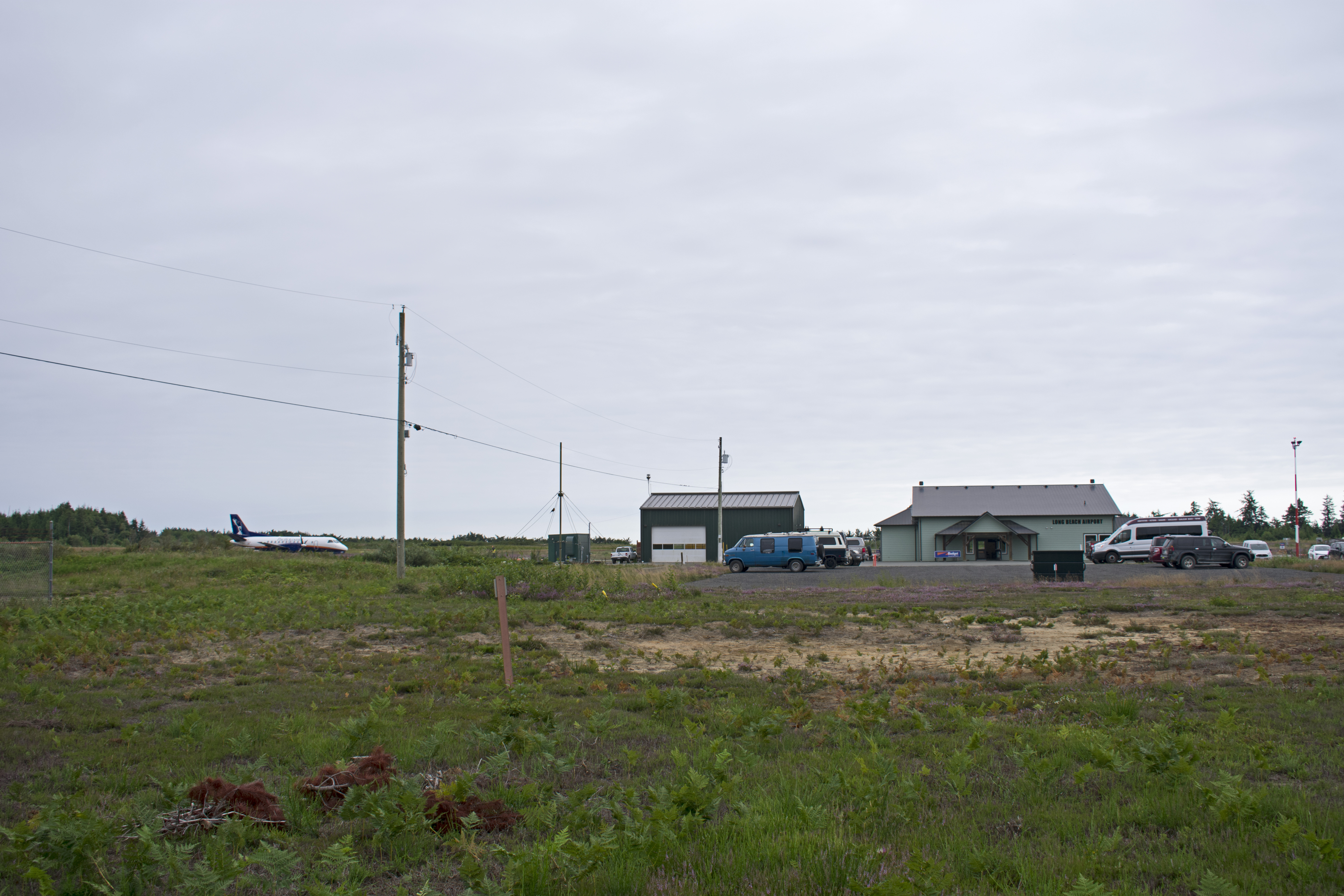
Tofino Long Beach Airport

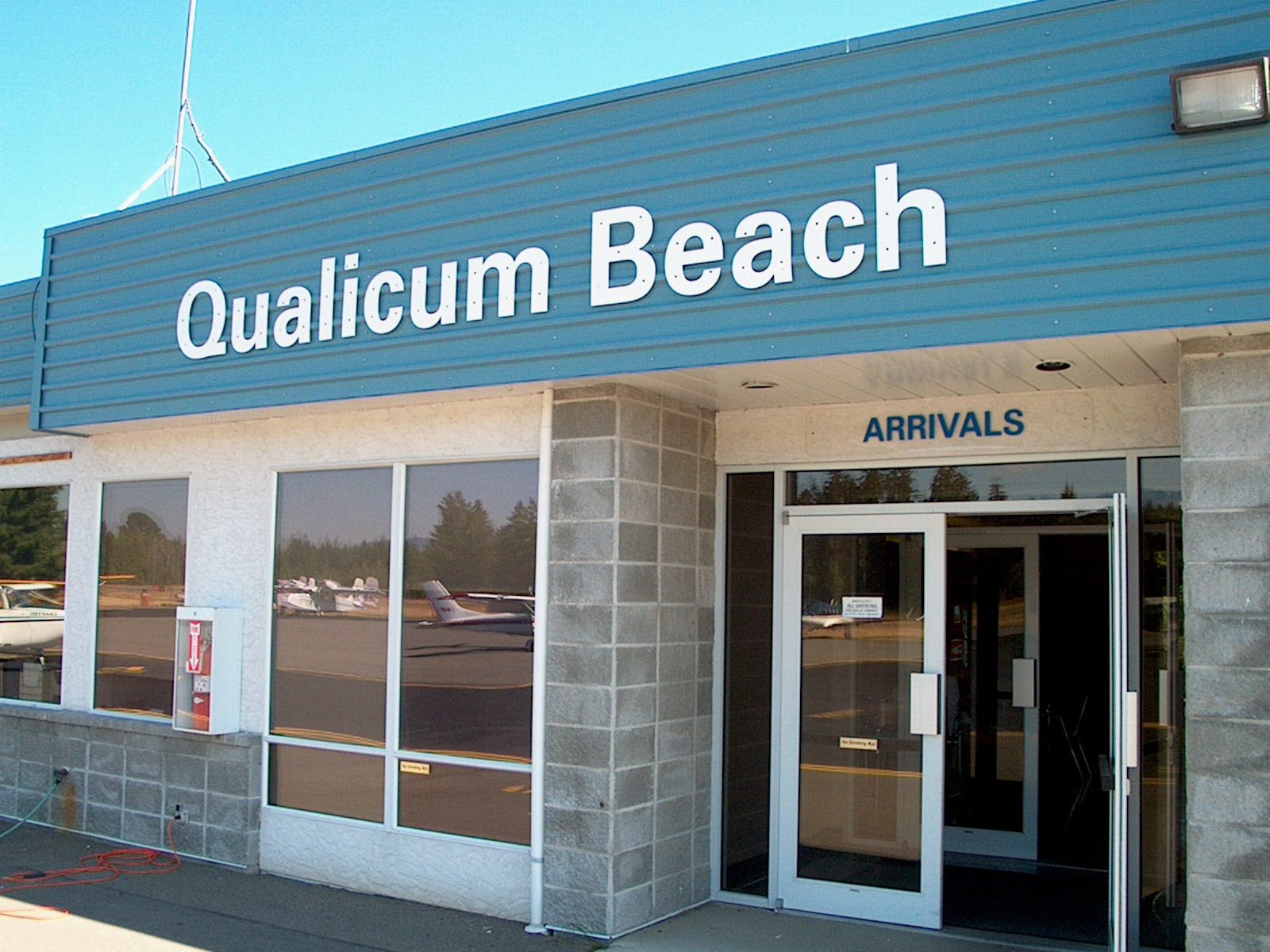
Qualicum Beach Airport

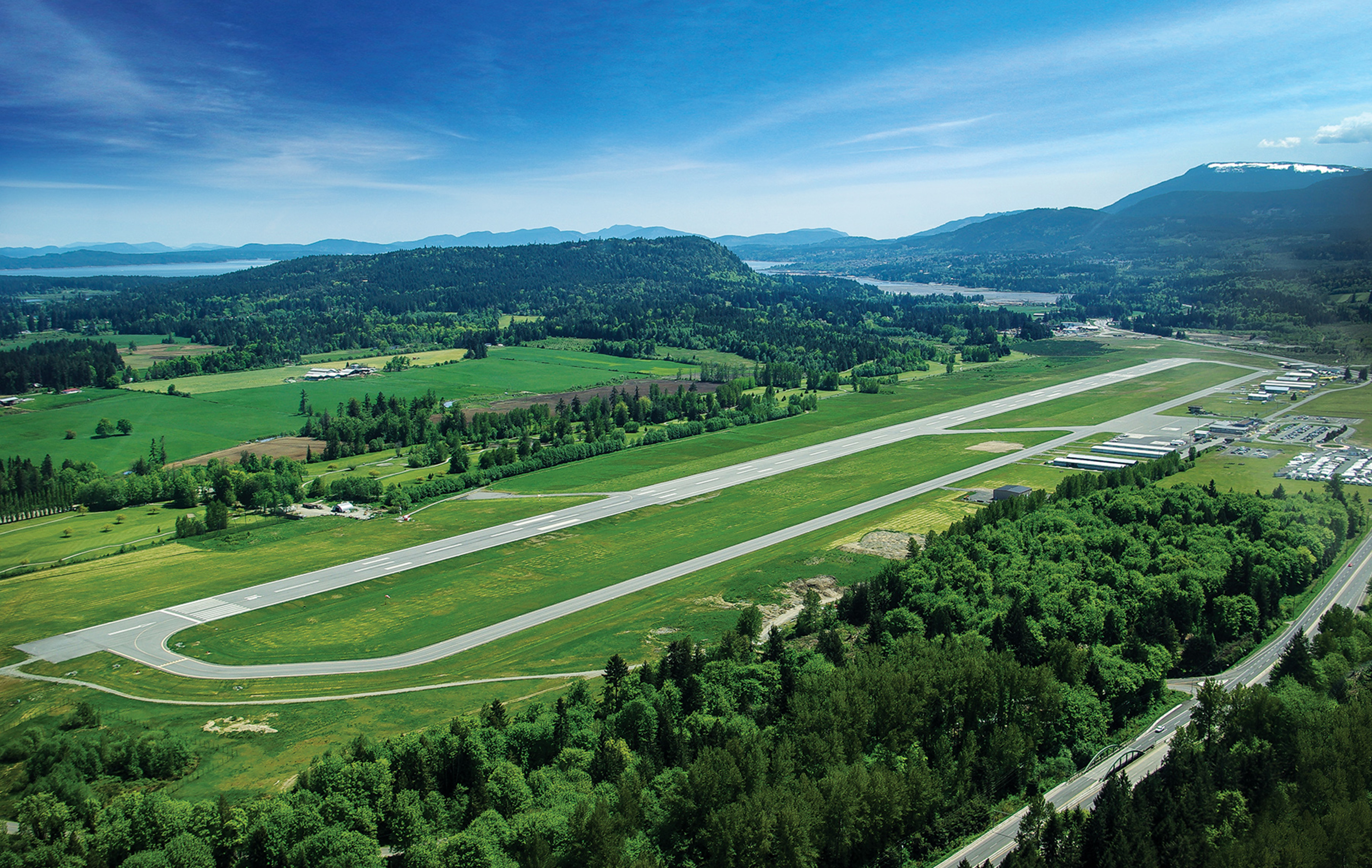
Nanaimo Airport

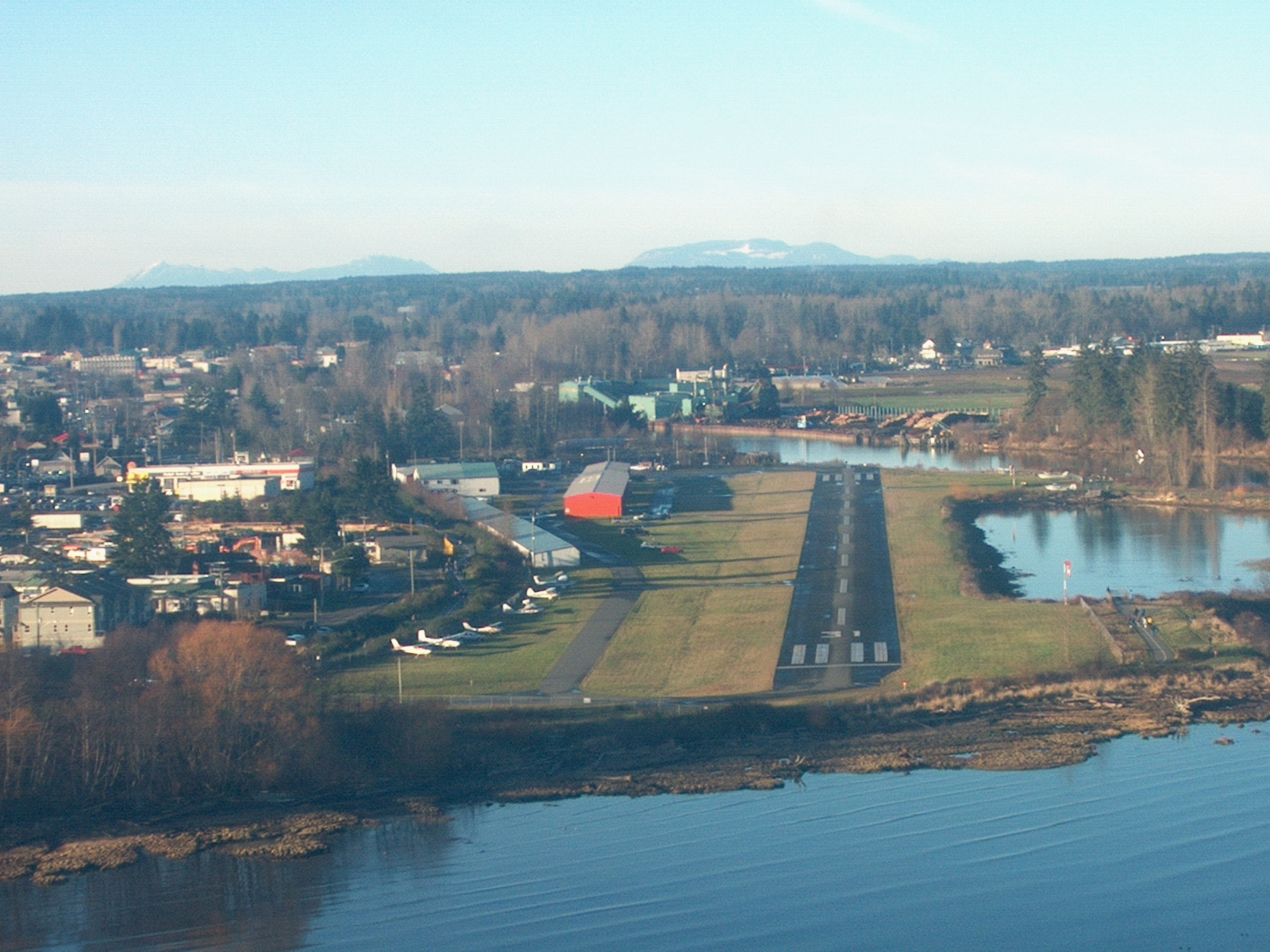
Courtenay Airpark

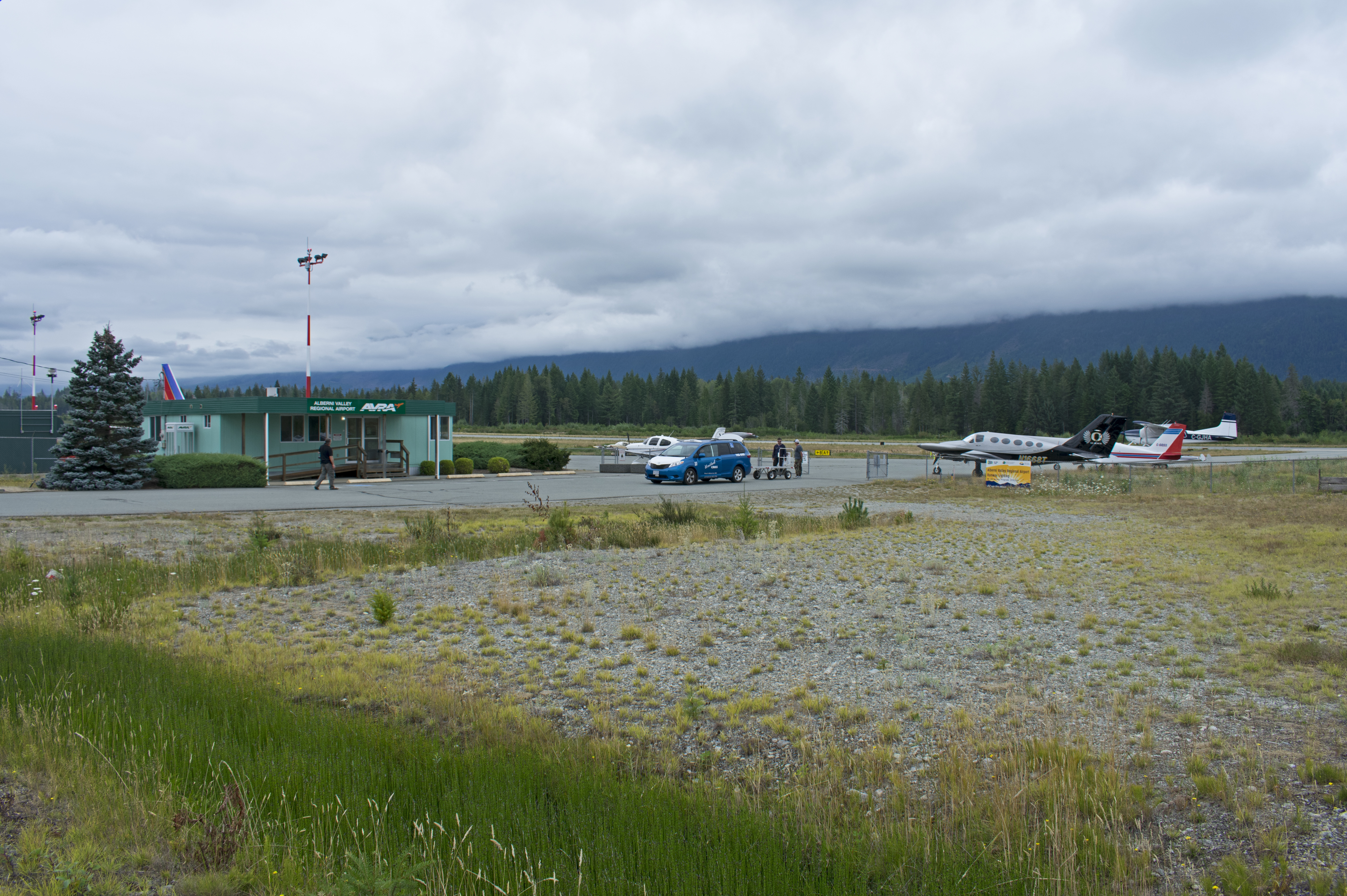
Port Alberni (Alberni Valley Regional) Airport

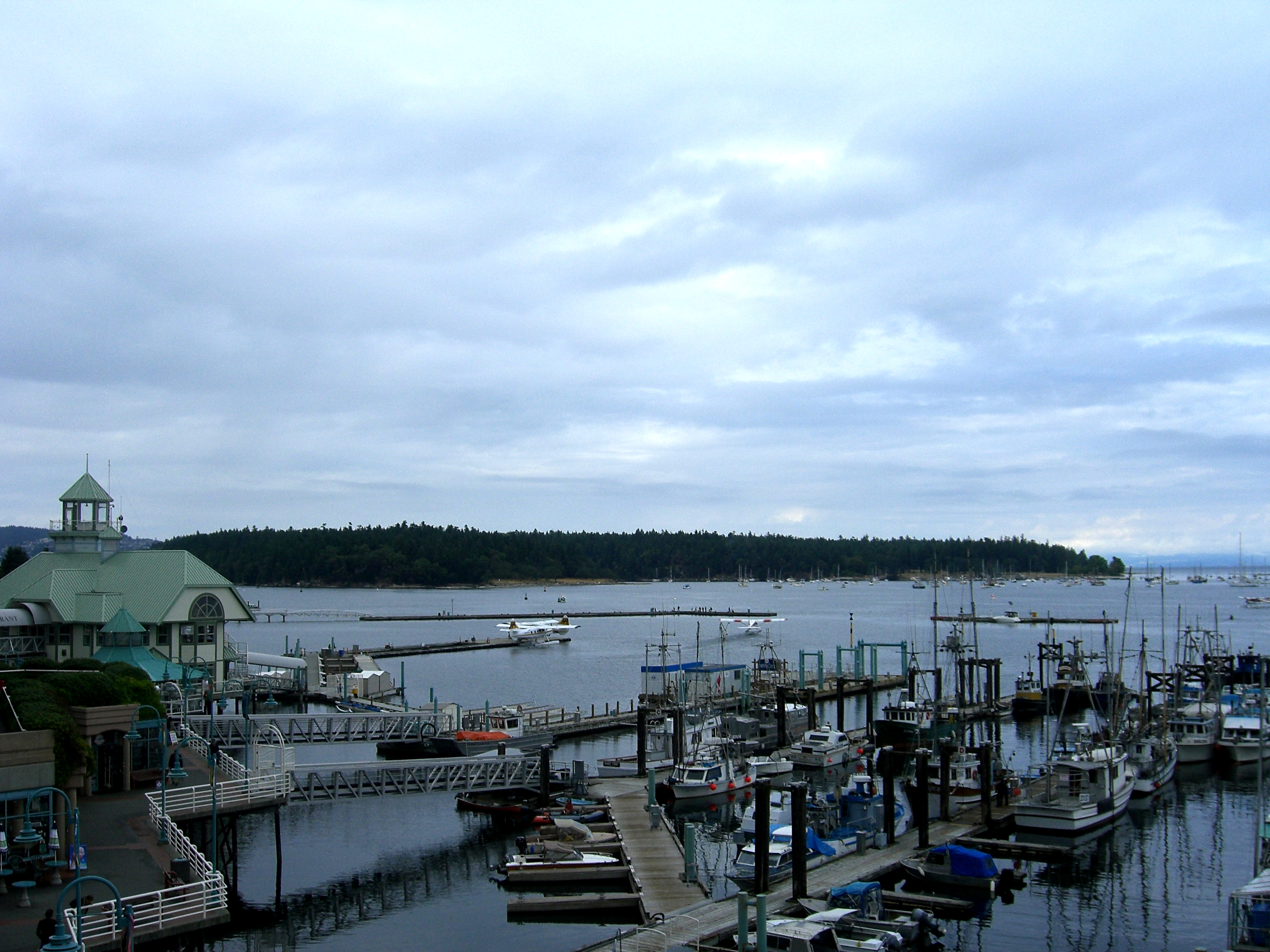
Nanaimo Harbour Water Aerodrome

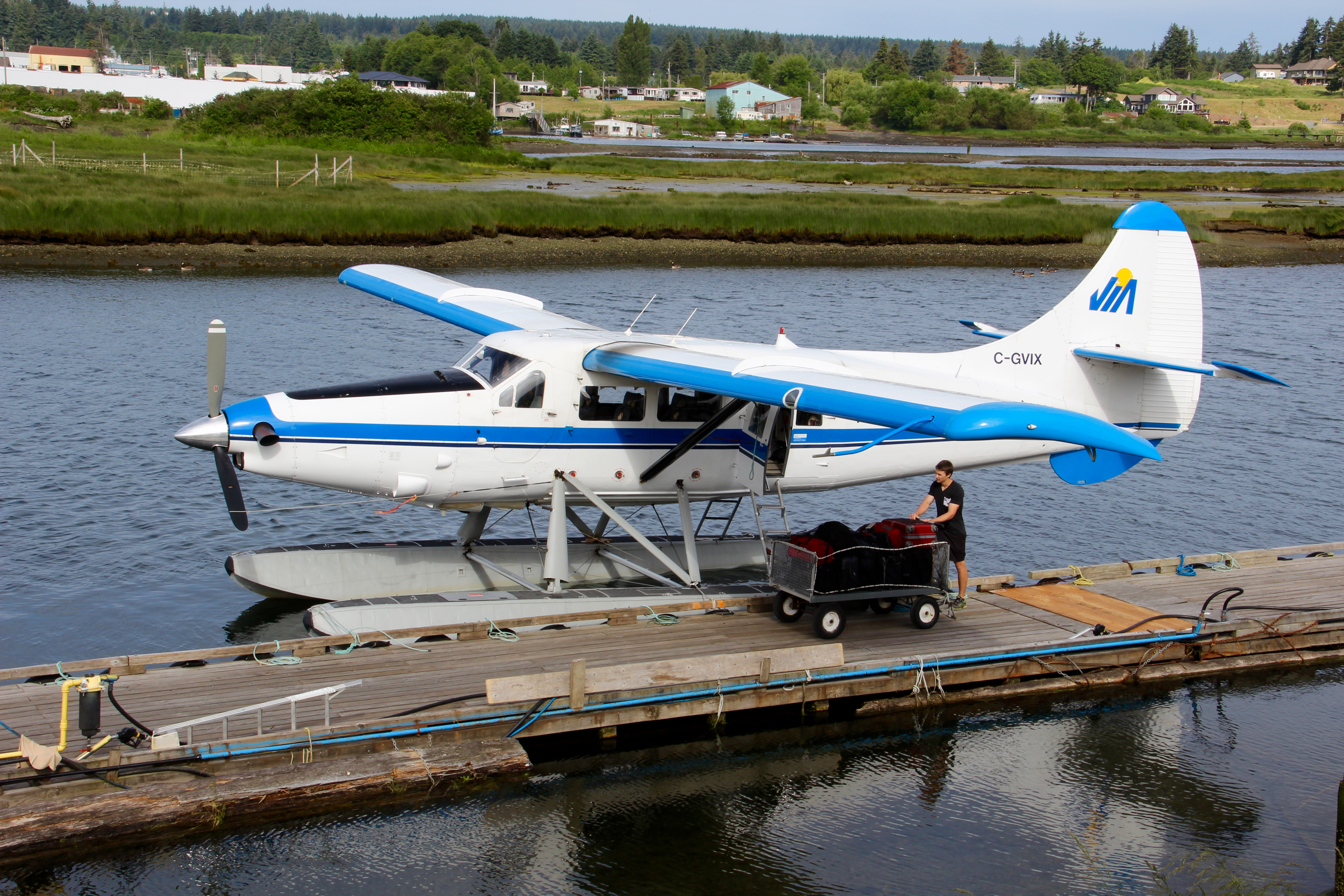
Campbell River Water Aerodrome

Airport name	ICAO/TC LID (IATA)	Location	Coordinates
Campbell River Airport	CYBL(YBL)	Campbell River	49°57′03″N 125°16′15″W
CFB Comox (Comox Airport)	CYQQ (YQQ)	Comox	49°42′39″N 124°53′12″W
Nanaimo Airport	CYCD (YCD)	Nanaimo	49°03′08″N 123°52′13″W
Port Hardy Airport	CYZT (YZT)	Port Hardy	50°40′50″N 127°22′00″W
Qualicum Beach Airport	CAT4 (XQU)	Qualicum Beach	49°20′14″N 124°23′38″W
Tofino-Long Beach Airport	CYAZ (YAZ)	Tofino	49°04′55″N 125°46′21″W

==== Other ====
Airport name	ICAO/TC LID (IATA)	Location	Coordinates
Courtenay Airpark	CAH3 (YCA)	Courtenay	49°40′46″N 124°58′54″W
Courtenay (Smit Field) Airport	CCS6	Courtenay	49°40′00″N 125°06′00″W
Duncan Airport	CAM3 (DUQ)	Duncan	48°45′17″N 123°42′35″W
Port Alberni (Alberni Valley Regional) Airport	CBS8 (YPB)	Port Alberni	49°19′16″N 124°55′46″W
Port McNeill Airport	CAT5 (YMP)	Port McNeill	50°34′32″N 127°01′43″W
Quamichan Lake (Raven Field) Airport	CML2	Quamichan Lake	48°48′43″N 123°39′02″W

=== Water aerodromes ===
==== Scheduled commercial airline service ====
Airport name	ICAO/TC LID (IATA)	Location	Coordinates
Campbell River Water Aerodrome (Campbell River Harbour Airport)	CAE3 (YBL)	Campbell River	50°03′00″N 125°15′00″W
Comox Water Aerodrome	CCX6	Comox	49°40′14″N 124°55′57″W
Nanaimo Harbour Water Aerodrome	CAC8 (ZNA)	Nanaimo Harbour	49°11′00″N 123°57′00″W
Port Alberni Water Aerodrome	CPW9	Port Alberni	49°13′55″N 124°48′53″W
Tofino Harbour Water Aerodrome	CAB4	Tofino Harbour	49°09′00″N 125°54′00″W

==== Other ====
Airport name	ICAO/TC LID (IATA)	Location	Coordinates
Courtenay Airpark Water Aerodrome	CBG9	Courtenay	49°40′53″N 124°58′53″W
Gold River Water Aerodrome	CAU6	Gold River	49°41′00″N 126°07′00″W
Nanaimo/Long Lake Water Airport	CAT3	Nanaimo	49°13′00″N 124°01′00″W
Port Alberni/Sproat Lake Water Aerodrome	CAA9	Port Alberni	49°17′00″N 124°57′00″W
Port Hardy Water Aerodrome	CAW5	Port Hardy	50°43′00″N 127°29′00″W
Port McNeill Water Aerodrome	CAM8	Port McNeill	50°35′00″N 127°06′00″W
Quamichan Lake (Raven Field) Water Aerodrome	CRF6	Quamichan Lake	48°48′43″N 123°39′02″W
Shawnigan Lake Water Aerodrome	CAV8	Shawnigan Lake	48°38′00″N 123°38′00″W
Tahsis Water Aerodrome	CAL9 (ZTS)	Tahsis	49°55′00″N 126°40′00″W
Ucluelet Water Aerodrome	CAN3	Ucluelet	48°57′00″N 125°33′00″W
Zeballos Water Aerodrome	CAA5	Zeballos	49°59′00″N 126°51′00″W

=== Heliports ===
Airport name	ICAO/TC LID (IATA)	Location	Coordinates
Campbell River (E & B Helicopters) Heliport	CCR6	Campbell River	50°02′30″N 125°16′30″W
Comox (St. Joseph's Hospital) Heliport	CBV8	Comox	49°40′30″N 124°56′29″W
Duncan (Cowichan District Hospital) Heliport	CDH4	Duncan	48°47′10″N 123°43′17″W
Gold River (E & B Helicopters) Heliport	CGR2	Gold River	49°45′11″N 126°03′19″W
Gold River (The Ridge) Heliport	CGR4	Gold River	49°47′00″N 126°02′37″W
Nanaimo/Gabriola Island (Health Clinic) Heliport	CGB4	Nanaimo	49°10′42″N 123°50′07″W
Nanaimo Harbour Heliport	CDH5	Nanaimo	49°09′39″N 123°55′24″W
Nanaimo (Regional Hospital) Heliport	CBG5	Nanaimo	49°11′09″N 123°58′18″W
Nanaimo (West Coast) Heliport	CNH9	Nanaimo	49°11′06″N 123°59′20″W
Port Alberni (West Coast General Hospital) Heliport	CBK5	Port Alberni	49°14′54″N 124°46′54″W
Port Alberni/Sproat Lake Tanker Base Heliport	CBT9	Port Alberni	49°17′24″N 124°56′42″W
Port Alice (Hospital) Heliport	CBB5	Port Alice	50°25′36″N 127°29′13″W
Port Hardy (Hospital) Heliport	CBS5	Port Hardy	50°43′15″N 127°30′11″W
Port McNeill (Hospital) Heliport	CBM9	Port McNeill	50°34′57″N 127°04′07″W
Qualicum Beach (Aerosmith Heli Service) Heliport	CAS5	Qualicum Beach	49°18′25″N 124°24′48″W
San Juan Point (Coast Guard) Heliport	CBJ9	San Juan Point	48°31′52″N 124°27′24″W
Tofino Lifeboat Station Heliport	CBR7	Tofino	49°08′00″N 125°54′00″W

== See also ==
- List of airports in the Gulf Islands
- List of airports in the Lower Mainland
- List of airports in the Okanagan
- List of airports in the Prince Rupert area
- List of airports in Greater Victoria
