= List of airports in the Lower Mainland =

Location in British Columbia
Locations in Vancouver

The following active airports serve the Lower Mainland region of British Columbia, Canada, including Greater Vancouver and the Fraser Valley:

== Land airports ==
=== Scheduled commercial airline service ===
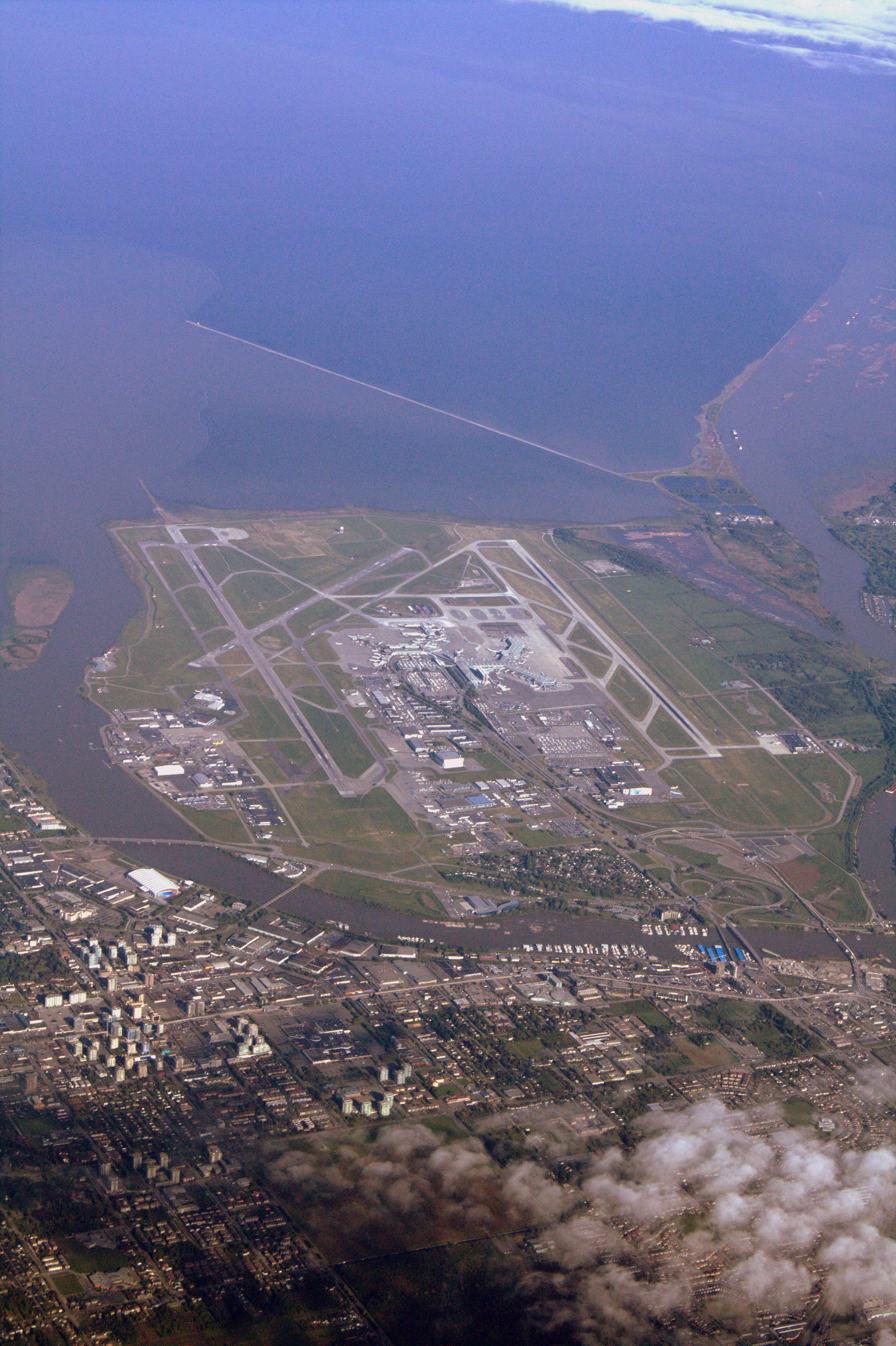
Vancouver International Airport

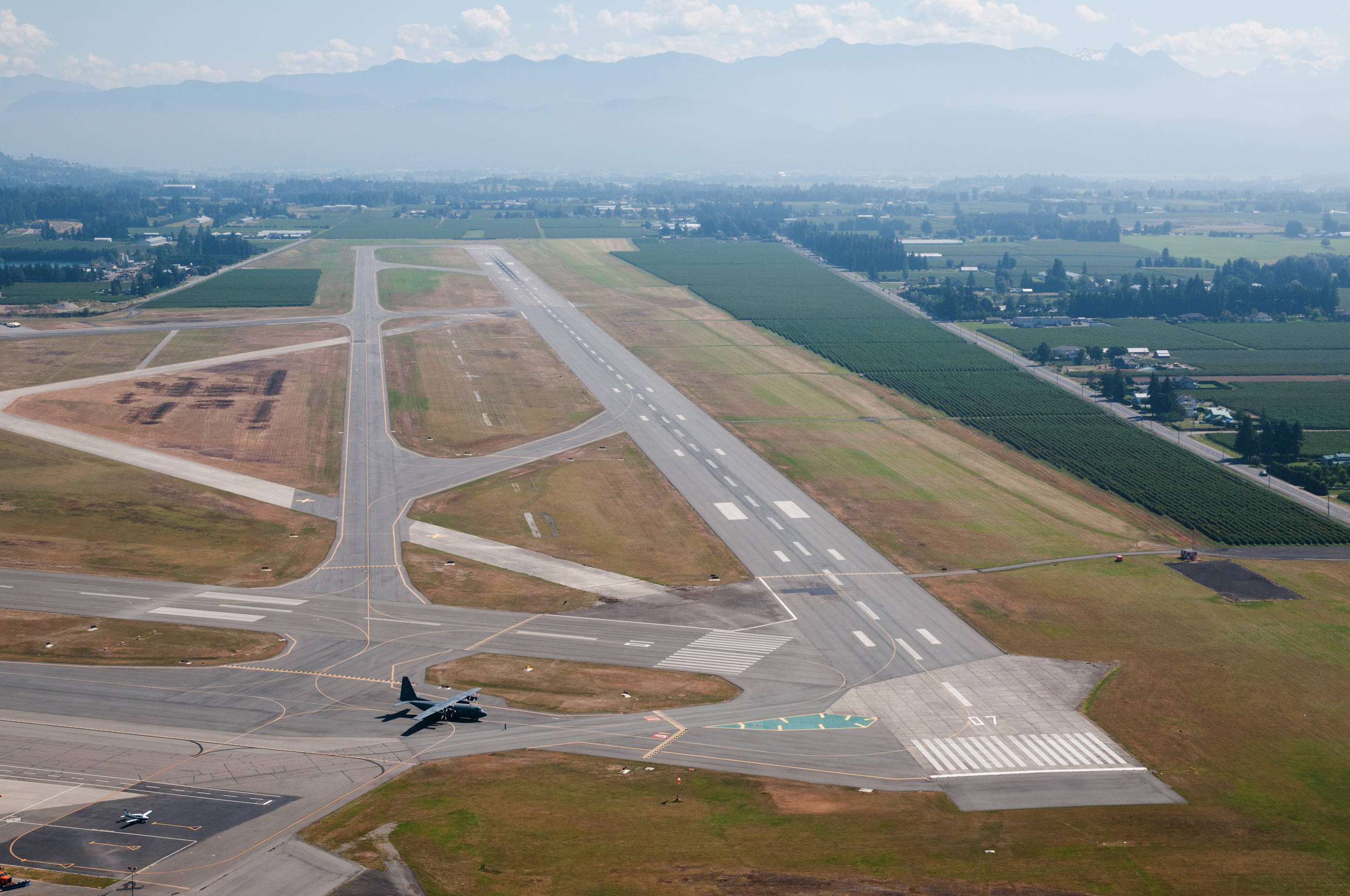
Abbotsford International Airport

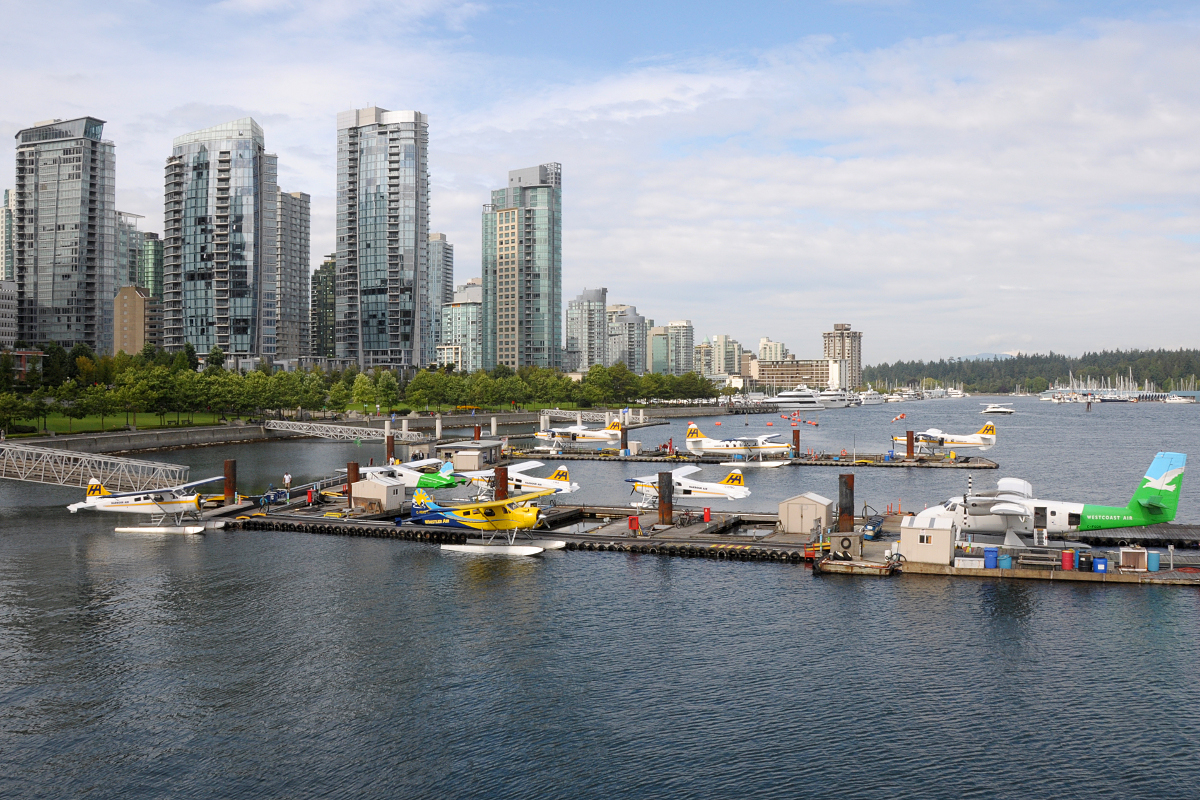
Vancouver Harbour Flight Centre

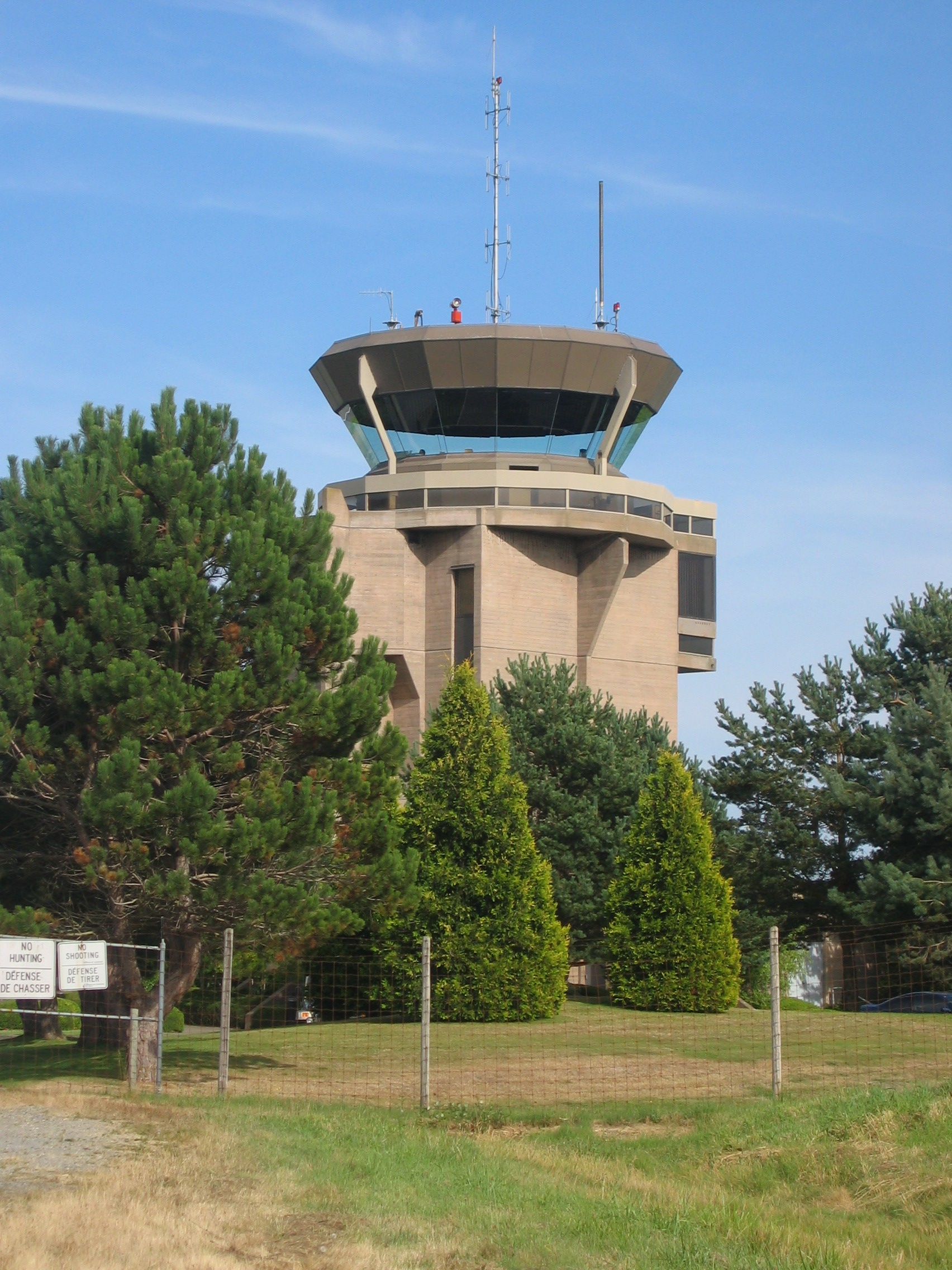
Control tower at Boundary Bay Airport

Airport name	ICAO/TC LID/IATA	Location	Coordinates
Abbotsford International Airport	CYXX/YXX	Abbotsford	49°01′31″N 122°21′36″W
Vancouver International Airport	CYVR/YVR	Richmond	49°11′41″N 123°11′02″W

=== Other ===
Airport name	ICAO/TC LID/IATA	Location	Coordinates
Boundary Bay Airport	CZBB/YDT	Delta	49°04′26″N 123°00′27″W
Chilliwack Airport	CYCW/YCW	Chilliwack	49°09′10″N 121°56′20″W
Delta/Delta Heritage Air Park	CAK3	Delta	49°04′25″N 122°56′28″W
Fort Langley Airport	CBQ2	Fort Langley	49°10′03″N 122°33′16″W
Hope Aerodrome	CYHE/YHE	Hope	49°22′06″N 121°29′53″W
Langley Regional Airport	CYNJ/YLY	Langley	49°06′04″N 122°37′50″W
Pitt Meadows Airport	CYPK	Pitt Meadows	49°12′58″N 122°42′36″W
Squamish Airport	CYSE/YSE	Squamish	49°46′54″N 123°09′43″W
Surrey/King George Airpark	CSK8	Surrey	49°05′42″N 122°49′10″W

== Former ==
Airport name	ICAO/TC LID/IATA	Location	Coordinates
CFB Chilliwack		Chilliwack	49°06′11″N 121°57′46″W
Canadian Forces Station Ladner		Delta	49°04′26″N 123°00′27″W
Minoru Park		Richmond	49°09′56″N 123°08′43″W
Tipella Airport	CBB7	Tipella	49°44′35″N 122°09′47″W

== Water aerodromes ==
=== Scheduled commercial airline service ===
Airport name	ICAO/TC LID/IATA	Location	Coordinates
Pitt Meadows Water Aerodrome	CAJ8	Pitt Meadows	49°12′32.68″N 122°42′31.10″W
Vancouver Harbour Flight Centre	CYHC/CXH	Coal Harbour	49°17′40″N 123°06′41″W
Vancouver International Water Airport	CAM9	Richmond	49°11′00″N 123°10′00″W

=== Other ===
Airport name	ICAO/TC LID/IATA	Location	Coordinates
Fort Langley Water Aerodrome	CAS4	Fort Langley	49°10′00″N 122°32′00″W
Harrison Hot Springs Water Aerodrome	CAE7	Harrison Hot Springs	49°18′00″N 121°46′00″W

== Former ==
Airport name	ICAO/TC LID/IATA	Location	Coordinates
Mission Water Aerodrome	CAY7	Mission	49°08′00″N 122°18′00″W

== Heliports ==
=== Scheduled commercial airline service ===
Airport name	ICAO/TC LID/IATA	Location	Coordinates
Vancouver/Harbour (Public) Heliport	CBC7	Downtown Vancouver	49°17′13″N 123°06′22″W

=== Other ===
Airport name	ICAO/TC LID/IATA	Location	Coordinates
Abbotsford (Regional Hospital & Cancer Centre) Heliport	CAB5	Abbotsford	49°02′10″N 122°18′51″W
Abbotsford (Sumas Mountain) Heliport	CSM7	Abbotsford	49°06′18″N 122°11′51″W
Abbotsford (Teck) Heliport	CTK8	Abbotsford	49°07′37″N 122°23′41″W
New Westminster (Royal Columbian Hospital) Heliport	CNW9	New Westminster	49°13′36″N 122°53′32″W
Vancouver (Children & Women's Health Centre) Heliport	CAK7	Vancouver	49°14′38″N 123°07′39″W
Vancouver/Coquitlam Fire and Rescue Heliport	CFR6	Vancouver	49°17′30″N 122°47′32″W
Vancouver/Delta (North) Heliport	CBD2	Delta	49°07′12″N 123°02′45″W
Vancouver/Delta (SEI) Heliport	CSE7	Delta	49°07′45″N 123°01′06″W
Vancouver (General Hospital) Heliport	CBK4	Vancouver	49°15′42″N 123°07′20″W
Vancouver (Surrey Memorial Hospital) Heliport	CVS3	Surrey	49°10′33″N 122°50′38″W

== See also ==
- List of airports in the Gulf Islands
- List of airports in the Okanagan
- List of airports in the Prince Rupert area
- List of airports on Vancouver Island
- List of airports in Greater Victoria
