= List of airports in the Gulf Islands =

Location in British Columbia

This is a list of airports on the Gulf Islands of British Columbia, Canada:

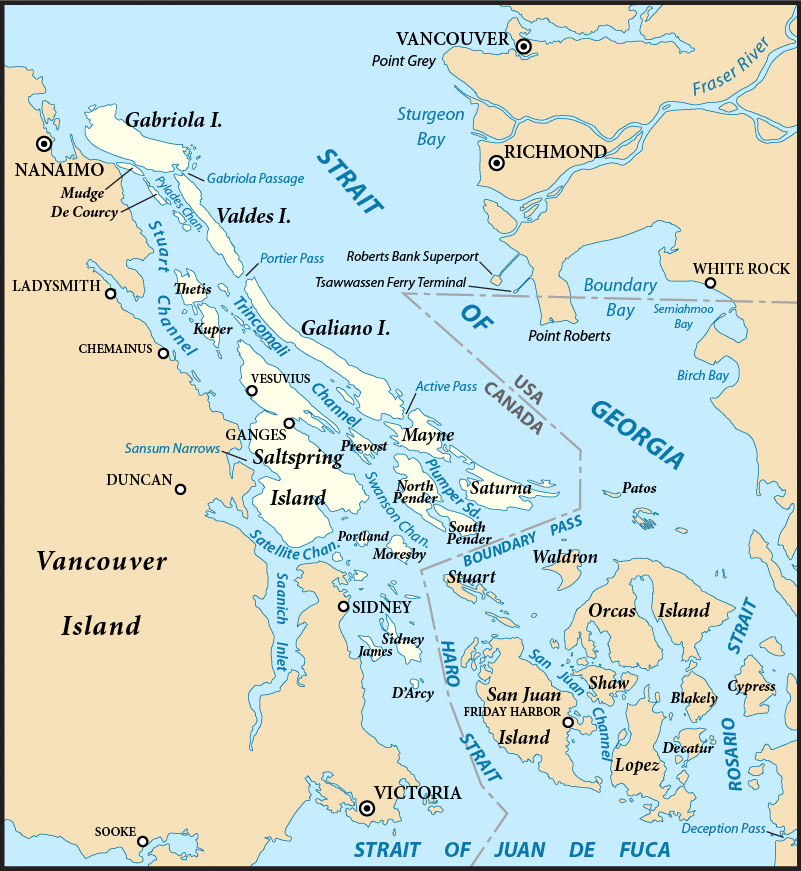
Map showing the location of the Southern Gulf Islands

== Southern Gulf Islands ==
The Southern Gulf Islands are those situated between Vancouver Island and the adjoining US and Canadian mainlands.

Airport name	ICAO/TC LID/IATA	Location	Coordinates
Bedwell Harbour Water Aerodrome	CAB3	Pender Island	48°45′00″N 123°14′00″W
Ganges Water Aerodrome	CAX6	Salt Spring Island	48°51′00″N 123°30′00″W
Ganges (Lady Minto/Gulf Islands Hospital) Heliport	CAL7	Salt Spring Island	48°51′4″N 123°30′31″W
Nanaimo/Gabriola Island (Health Clinic) Heliport	CBG4	Gabriola Island	49°10′42″N 123°50′07″W
Mayne Island Water Aerodrome	CAW7	Mayne Island	48°52′00″N 123°18′00″W
Mayne Island (Medical Emergency) Heliport	CBF5	Mayne Island	48°50′48″N 123°17′03″W
Port Washington Water Aerodrome	CAP8	Pender Island	48°49′00″N 123°19′00″W

== Northern Gulf Islands ==
The term Northern Gulf Islands is used for those islands further north within the Gulf of Georgia region, including those close to the mainland to the northwest of Greater Vancouver.

Airport name	ICAO/TC LID/IATA	Location	Coordinates
Cortes Island Aerodrome	CCI9/YCF	Cortes Island	50°01′25″N 124°59′03″W
Cortes Island Heliport	CBL7	Cortes Island	50°03′31″N 124°58′54″W
Lasqueti Island/False Bay Water Aerodrome	CAT7	Lasqueti Island	49°30′00″N 124°21′00″W
Texada/Gillies Bay Airport	CYGB/YGB	Texada Island	49°41′39″N 124°31′04″W
Whaletown Water Aerodrome	CAW9	Texada Island	50°06′00″N 125°03′00″W

== See also ==
- List of airports in the Lower Mainland
- List of airports in the Okanagan
- List of airports in the Prince Rupert area
- List of airports on Vancouver Island
- List of airports in Greater Victoria
