= Island Health =

Public health authority in Vancouver, British Columbia, Canada

- Formation: 2001; 25 years ago
- Type: British Columbia Health Authority
- CEO: Kathy MacNeil
- Budget: $2.8 billion in 2019/20
- Staff: 23,000 staff; 2,500 medical staff; 4,000 volunteers
- Website: www.islandhealth.ca

Island Health, formerly the Vancouver Island Health Authority, is the publicly funded health care provider in the southwestern portion of the Canadian province of British Columbia. It was established as one of five geographically based health authorities in 2001 by the Government of British Columbia.

Island Health provides health care to over 900,000 people over a geographic area of 56,000 square kilometres (22,000 sq mi). In the early stages of the COVID-19 pandemic in British Columbia, Island Health had 96 intensive care unit (ICU) beds and 140 ventilators available, including 22 transport ventilators.

== Communities ==
The region includes the communities of:

- Vancouver Island
- Gulf Islands
- Johnstone Strait
- Central Coast (part of)

The largest population center is Greater Victoria on the southern tip of Vancouver Island as the majority constituent of the Capital Regional District (CRD; population 383,360 as of the Canada 2016 Census), which also includes some of the southern Gulf Islands.

Outside of the CRD, the primary hospital serving the populous lower island is the Nanaimo Regional General Hospital, serving Nanaimo and Parksville.

The other four metropolitan communities on Vancouver Island which function as centres of primary care are Courtenay, Campbell River, Duncan, and Port Alberni.

== Service ==
The main hospitals serving the CRD are the Royal Jubilee Hospital and the Victoria General Hospital, with the smaller Saanich Peninsula Hospital providing service to the Central Saanich and North Saanich municipalities. Saanich Peninsula Hospital "was built in 1974 as an Extended Care facility and has grown to become a full service hospital with 48 acute care beds and 144 extended care beds".

Nanaimo Regional General Hospital is slated to receive a new $33.85-million intensive care unit in 2021. "It will replace what a 2013 Island Health report deemed the 'worst' ICU in Canada."

Campbell River and Comox Valley both have new facilities as of 2017. North Island Hospital Campbell River and District provides 95 beds.

== Facilities ==
Island Health's 150 hospitals and health centres include:

- Bamfield Health Centre
- Chemainus Health Care Centre
- Cormorant Island Health Centre
- Cortes Health Centre
- Cowichan District Hospital
- Cumberland Health Centre (Laboratory Only)
- Gabriola Medical Clinic
- Galiano Island Health Care Centre
- Gold River Health Centre
- Hornby Island Medical Clinic
- Kyuquot Health Centre
- Lady Minto/Gulf Islands Hospital
- Ladysmith Community Health Centre
- Mayne Island Health Care Centre
- Namgis Health Centre
- Nanaimo Regional General Hospital
- North Island Hospital Campbell River
- North Island Hospital Comox Valley
- Pender Islands Bishop Coleman Memorial Health Centre
- Port Alice Health Centre
- Port Hardy Hospital
- Port McNeill and District Hospital
- Queen Alexandra Centre for Children's Health
- Royal Jubilee Hospital
- Saanich Peninsula Hospital
- Saturna Island Medical Clinic
- St. Joseph's General Hospital (Affiliate)
- Sointula Health Centre
- Tahsis Health Centre
- Tofino General Hospital
- Victoria General Hospital
- Victoria Hospice (Palliative Care)
- West Coast General Hospital, Port Alberni
- Zeballos Health Centre
