= Campbell River Water Aerodrome =

Airport in British Columbia, Canada

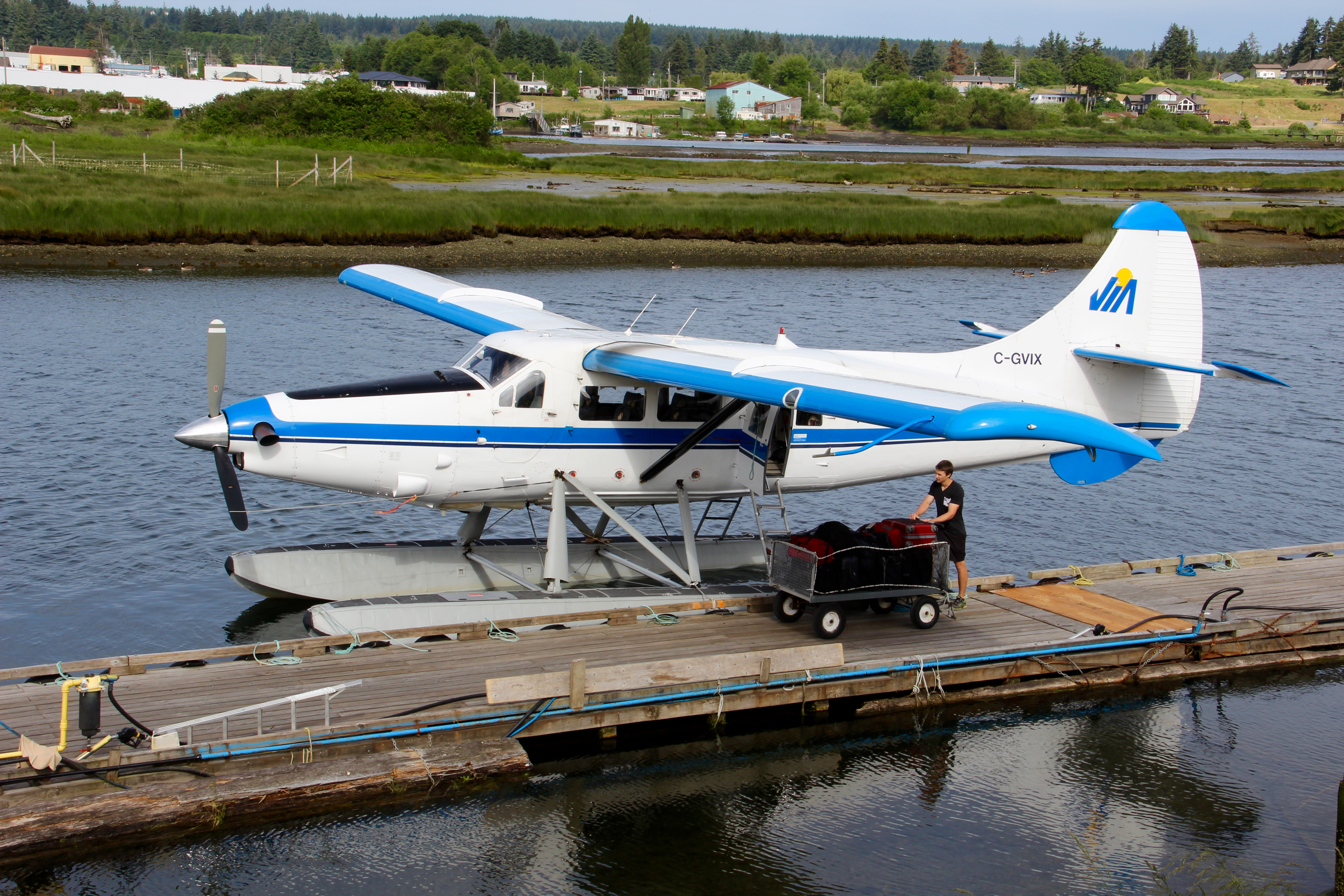
- IATA: YHH; ICAO: none; TC LID: CAE3

Summary
- Airport type: Private
- Operator: Corilair Charters Ltd.
- Location: Campbell River, British Columbia
- Time zone: PST (UTC−08:00)
  - Summer (DST): PDT (UTC−07:00)
- Elevation AMSL: 0 ft / 0 m
- Coordinates: 50°03′N 125°15′W

Map
- Location in British Columbia CAE3 (Canada)

Runways
Direction	Length		Surface
Direction	ft	m	Surface
n/a	n/a	n/a	Water
- Source: Water Aerodrome Supplement

Campbell River Water Aerodrome or Campbell River Harbour Airport, (IATA: YHH, TC LID: CAE3), is located adjacent to Campbell River, British Columbia, Canada.

The airport is classified as an airport of entry by Nav Canada and is staffed by the Canada Border Services Agency. CBSA officers at this airport can handle general aviation aircraft only, with no more than 15 passengers.

== Airlines and destinations ==
Airlines	Destinations
Corilair	Alert Bay, Arron Point, Blind Channel, Cortes Bay, Dent Island, Fredrick Arm, Gilford Island, Hernando Island, Lund, Owen Bay, Port McNeill, Powell River, Prideaux Heven, Refuge Cove, Sevary Island, Sonora Island, Stuart Island-Big Bay, Surge Narrows; Seasonal: Vancouver

== See also ==
- List of airports on Vancouver Island
