= Midway Aerodrome =

- IATA: none; ICAO: none; TC LID: CBM6

Summary
- Airport type: Public
- Operator: Village of Midway
- Location: Midway, British Columbia
- Time zone: MST (UTC−07:00)
- Elevation AMSL: 1,896 ft / 578 m
- Coordinates: 49°00′36″N 118°47′23″W

Map
- Location in British Columbia

Runways
Direction	Length		Surface
Direction	ft	m	Surface
08/26	3,500	1,067	Turf
- Source: Canada Flight Supplement

Midway Aerodrome (TC LID: CBM6) is located adjacent to Midway, British Columbia, Canada.

== History ==
In approximately 1942 the aerodrome was listed as RCAF Aerodrome - Midway, British Columbia at 49°01′N 118°47′W with no listed variation and elevation of 1,950 ft (590 m). The aerodrome was listed as an "all way field" with dimensions listed as follows:

Runway name	Length	Width	Surface
	3,400 ft (1,000 m)	1,000 ft (300 m)	Turf
