= Victoria General Hospital (Victoria, British Columbia) =

Hospital in Victoria, British Columbia, Canada

- Island Health
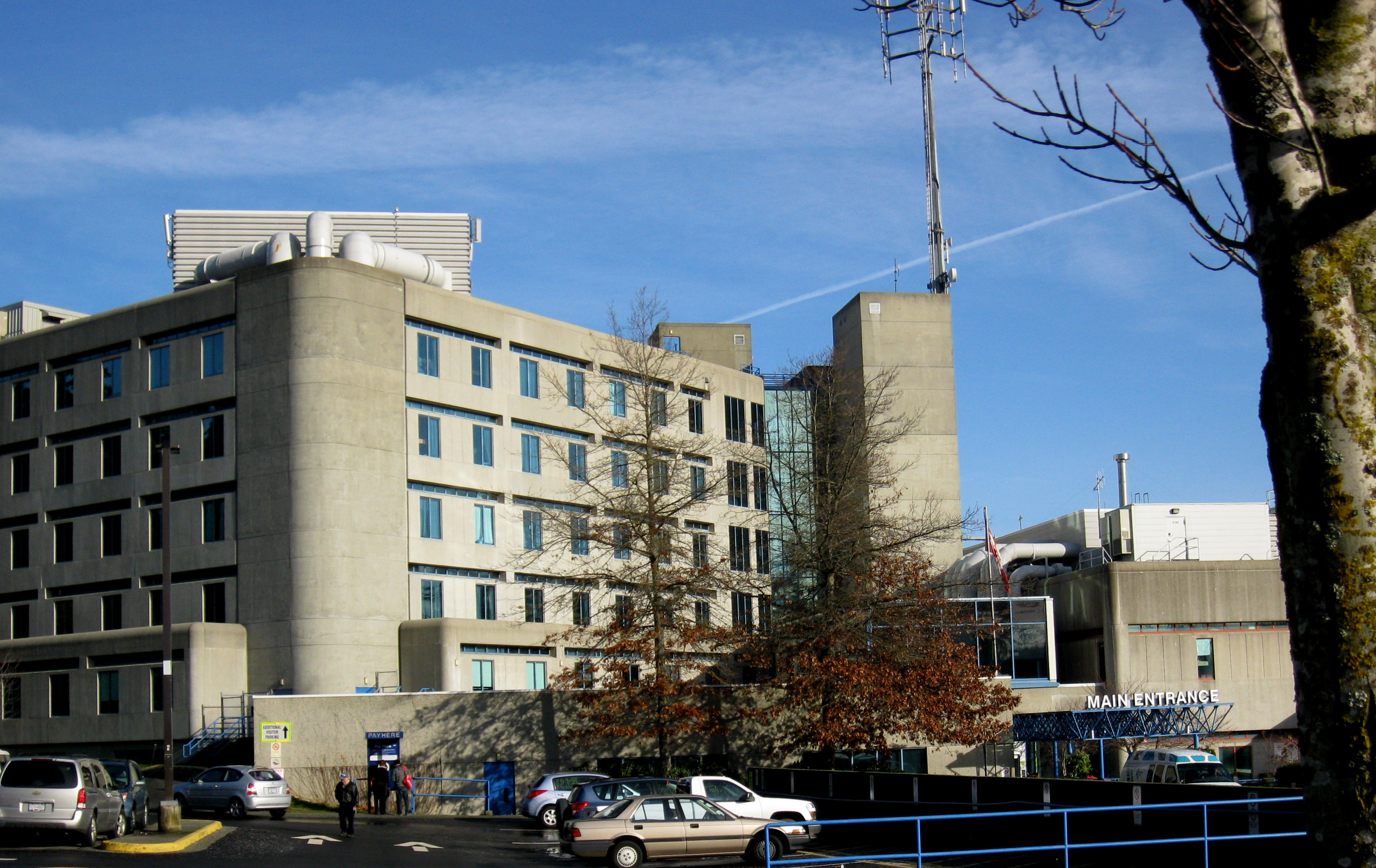

- Location in British Columbia

Geography
- Location: 1 Hospital Way, Victoria, British Columbia V8Z 6R5, Canada
- Coordinates: 48.467222°N 123.4325°W

Organization
- Care system: Public Medicare (Canada)
- Type: General

Services
- Emergency department: Yes (II trauma centre)
- Beds: 374

Helipads
- Helipad: TC LID: CBW7

History
- Founded: 1876 (original hospital); 1983 (current hospital)

Links
- Website: www.islandhealth.ca/our-locations/hospitals-health-centre-locations/victoria-general-hospital-vgh
- Lists: Hospitals in Canada

Victoria General Hospital (VGH) is an acute care facility located in View Royal, British Columbia, Canada, a western suburb of Victoria. VGH provides emergency, general surgery and medical treatment services. It is one of two acute-care hospitals on southern Vancouver Island, along with the Royal Jubilee Hospital. VGH is the only one of the two hospitals which provides maternity services.

The facility has 344 acute care beds, 30 Neuro-Rehabilitation beds and 40 Geriatric Ward beds. It is also a teaching hospital for UBC's Department of Orthopaedic Surgery.

== History ==
The current hospital was constructed in 1983. It was known as Victoria General Hospital North until Victoria General Hospital South (in downtown Victoria) was closed a year later. VGH South was known before 1983, as Victoria General Hospital and before that as St. Joseph's Hospital. St. Joseph's Hospital was founded in 1875, and taken over from the Roman Catholic Diocese of Victoria by the provincial government in 1972.

== Philanthropy ==
Victoria General Hospital is one of three facilities supported by the Victoria Hospitals Foundation, which also provides financial support to the Royal Jubilee Hospital and the Gorge Road Health Centre, both in Victoria.

== See also ==
- List of hospitals in British Columbia
