= Royal Jubilee Hospital =

Hospital in Victoria, British Columbia, Canada

- Island Health
- Location in British Columbia

Geography
- Location: Victoria, British Columbia, Canada
- Coordinates: 48.4334°N 123.3274°W

Organization
- Care system: Public Medicare (Canada)
- Type: General
- Affiliated university: University of British Columbia

Services
- Emergency department: Yes
- Beds: 500

Helipads
- Helipad: TC LID: CBK8

History
- Founded: May 20, 1890

Links
- Website: www.islandhealth.ca/our-locations/hospitals-health-centre-locations/royal-jubilee-hospital-rjh
- Lists: Hospitals in Canada

Royal Jubilee Hospital is a 500-bed general hospital in Victoria, British Columbia, Canada, located about 3 km (1.9 mi) east of the city centre, in the Jubilee neighbourhood (itself named after the hospital).

== Overview ==
Its name commemorates the Golden Jubilee of Queen Victoria in 1887. Founded in 1890, Royal Jubilee was Victoria's main hospital until 1983, when an expanded Victoria General Hospital re-opened in the suburban municipality of View Royal. Royal Jubilee offers critical-care, surgery, diagnostics, emergency facilities and other patient programs. It has a particular focus on cardiac medicine.

In 2007, the British Columbia government announced that it would expand and renovate the hospital, increasing the number of beds to 500 and replacing many buildings. The new 500-bed patient care centre (PCC) was opened to the public in early 2011.

== Begbie Hall ==
Begbie Hall, a three-storey former nurses' residence at the hospital, was designated a National Historic Site of Canada in 1989 to commemorate the growing professionalism of nursing in the early 20th century and the contribution of nurses to health care in Canada. Today, Begbie Hall is used for administrative offices, and contains the Woodward Theatre for meetings. The Woodward Theatre was apparently the original cafeteria for the resident nurses. The Island Health Board of Directors removed the name Begbie from the building in 2021.

== Pemberton Memorial Operating Room ==
Bust of Inazō Nitobe and Pemberton Memorial Chapel at Royal Jubilee Hospital in Victoria, BC

The octagonal Pemberton Memorial Operating Room, completed in 1896, was designated a National Historic Site in 2005. It is an octagonal brick operating room; a rare surviving example of a late 19th-century surgical facility from the period when hospitals were transitioning from primarily charitable to scientific institutions.

== See also ==
- List of historic places in Victoria, British Columbia
- List of hospitals in British Columbia
- Royal eponyms in Canada
