= List of Canadian airports by location indicator: CA =

This is a list of all Nav Canada certified and registered water and land airports, aerodromes and heliports in the provinces and territories of Canada sorted by location identifier.

They are listed in the format:

- Location indicator – IATA – Airport name (alternate name) – Airport location

== CA – Canada – CAN ==
Also see airport category and list.

TC LID	IATA	Airport name	Community	Province or territory
CAA2		Saint-André-Avellin Aerodrome	Saint-André-Avellin	Quebec
CAA3		Westlock (Healthcare Centre) Heliport	Westlock	Alberta
CAA4		Saint-Apollinaire (Airpro) Aerodrome	Saint-Apollinaire	Quebec
CAA5		Zeballos Water Aerodrome	Zeballos	British Columbia
CAA6		Smithers (Canadian) Heliport	Smithers	British Columbia
CAA7		Gilford Island/Echo Bay Water Aerodrome	Gilford Island	British Columbia
CAA8		Invermere Airport	Invermere	British Columbia
CAA9		Port Alberni/Sproat Lake Water Aerodrome	Port Alberni (Sproat Lake)	British Columbia
CAB3		Bedwell Harbour Water Aerodrome	Bedwell Harbour	British Columbia
CAB4		Tofino Harbour Water Aerodrome	Tofino Harbour	British Columbia
CAB5		Abbotsford (Regional Hospital & Cancer Centre) Heliport	Abbotsford	British Columbia
CAB7		Kelowna (Alpine) Heliport	Kelowna	British Columbia
CAC5		Dorset/Averell's Cove Water Aerodrome	Dorset	Ontario
CAC6		Calgary (Alberta Children's Hospital) Heliport	Calgary	Alberta
CAC8	ZNA	Nanaimo Harbour Water Aerodrome	Nanaimo Harbour	British Columbia
CAC9		Stewart Water Aerodrome	Stewart	British Columbia
CAD2		Red Deer/Allan Dale Residence Heliport	Red Deer	Alberta
CAD3		Red Deer/Allan Dale Trailers & RV Heliport	Red Deer	Alberta
CAD4		Trail Airport	Trail	British Columbia
CAD5	YMB	Merritt Airport (Saunders Field)	Merritt	British Columbia
CAD6		Atlin Water Aerodrome	Atlin	British Columbia
CAD7		Gilford Island/Health Bay Water Aerodrome	Gilford Island	British Columbia
CAD8		Nelson Water Aerodrome	Nelson	British Columbia
CAD9		Coulson/Norwood Dale Field Aerodrome	Coulson	Ontario
CAE2		Cranbrook (East Kootenay Regional Hospital) Heliport	Cranbrook	British Columbia
CAE3	YBL	Campbell River Water Aerodrome (Campbell River Harbour Airport)	Campbell River	British Columbia
CAE5		Whistler/Green Lake Water Aerodrome	Whistler	British Columbia
CAE7		Harrison Hot Springs Water Aerodrome	Harrison Hot Springs	British Columbia
CAE9		Bamfield Water Aerodrome	Bamfield	British Columbia
CAF2		Cayuga East Aerodrome	Cayuga	Ontario
CAF4		Tsuniah Lake Lodge Airport	Tsuniah Lake Lodge	British Columbia
CAF6		Big Bay Water Aerodrome	Big Bay	British Columbia
CAF8		Nimpo Lake Water Aerodrome	Nimpo Lake	British Columbia
CAG2		Regina/Aerogate Aerodrome	Regina	Saskatchewan
CAG3	CJH	Chilko Lake (Tsylos Park Lodge) Aerodrome	Chilko Lake	British Columbia
CAG4		Vulcan/Agro 1 Aerodrome	Vulcan	Alberta
CAG6		Blind Channel Water Aerodrome	Blind Channel	British Columbia
CAG8	YPT	Pender Harbour Water Aerodrome	Pender Harbour	British Columbia
CAG9		Surge Narrows Water Aerodrome	Surge Narrows Provincial Park	British Columbia
CAH2	ZOF	Ocean Falls Water Aerodrome	Ocean Falls	British Columbia
CAH3	YCA	Courtenay Airpark	Courtenay	British Columbia
CAH4		Valemount Airport	Valemount	British Columbia
CAH5		Parksville (Ascent Helicopters) Heliport	Parksville	British Columbia
CAH7		Kamloops Water Aerodrome	Kamloops	British Columbia
CAH9	YXT	Telegraph Creek Water Aerodrome	Telegraph Creek	British Columbia
CAJ2		Wiley Aerodrome	Eagle Plains	Yukon
CAJ3		Creston Aerodrome	Creston	British Columbia
CAJ4	YAA	Anahim Lake Airport	Anahim Lake	British Columbia
CAJ5		Ajax (PR Ajax) Aerodrome	Ajax	Ontario
CAJ7		Cayley/A. J. Flying Ranch Airport	Cayley	Alberta
CAJ8		Pitt Meadows Water Aerodrome	Pitt Meadows	British Columbia
CAJ9		Fort Ware Airport	Kwadacha	British Columbia
CAK3		Delta Heritage Air Park	Delta	British Columbia
CAK6		Camp Cordero Water Aerodrome	Camp Cordero	British Columbia
CAK7		Vancouver (Children & Women's Health Centre) Heliport	Vancouver	British Columbia
CAL2		Nakusp (Arrow Lakes Hospital) Heliport	Nakusp	British Columbia
CAL3		Douglas Lake Airport	Douglas Lake	British Columbia
CAL4		Fort MacKay/Albian Aerodrome	Fort McKay	Alberta
CAL5		Almonte (General Hospital) Heliport	Almonte	Ontario
CAL6		Prince Albert (Fire Centre) Heliport	Prince Albert	Saskatchewan
CAL7		Ganges (Lady Minto/Gulf Islands Hospital) Heliport	Ganges	British Columbia
CAL8		Sainte-Anne-du-Lac (Aviation PLMG Inc.) Aerodrome	Sainte-Anne-du-Lac	Quebec
CAL9		Tahsis Water Aerodrome	Tahsis	British Columbia
CAM2		Misaw Lake Aerodrome	Misaw Lake	Saskatchewan
CAM3	DUQ	Duncan Airport	Duncan	British Columbia
CAM4		Alhambra/Ahlstrom Aerodrome	Alhambra	Alberta
CAM5		Houston Aerodrome	Houston	British Columbia
CAM8		Port McNeill Water Aerodrome	Port McNeill	British Columbia
CAM9		Vancouver International Water Airport	Vancouver	British Columbia
CAN3		Ucluelet Water Aerodrome	Ucluelet	British Columbia
CAN5		Allan Aerodrome	Allan	Saskatchewan
CAN6		Prince Rupert/Digby Island Water Aerodrome	Prince Rupert	British Columbia
CAP2		Allan Park Aerodrome	Allan Park	Ontario
CAP3		Sechelt Aerodrome	Sechelt / Gibsons	British Columbia
CAP5		Victoria Airport Water Aerodrome	Victoria	British Columbia
CAP6		Ingenika Airport	Ingenika	British Columbia
CAP7	YKK	Kitkatla Water Aerodrome	Kitkatla	British Columbia
CAP9		Strathmore (Appleton Field) Aerodrome	Strathmore	Alberta
CAQ3		Coal Harbour Water Aerodrome	Coal Harbour	British Columbia
CAQ4	YSE	Springhouse Airpark	Springhouse	British Columbia
CAQ5		Nakusp Airport	Nakusp	British Columbia
CAQ6		Queen Charlotte City Water Aerodrome	Daajing Giids	British Columbia
CAQ8	WPL	Powell Lake Water Aerodrome	Powell Lake	British Columbia
CAR3		Calgary (Aerial Recon) Heliport	Calgary	Alberta
CAR4		Cameron/Arbour Airfield	Cameron	Ontario
CAR7		Kyuquot Water Aerodrome	Kyuquot	British Columbia
CAR9		Bella Bella/Waglisla Water Aerodrome	Bella Bella	British Columbia
CAS2		Moose Lake (Lodge) Airport	Moose Lake	British Columbia
CAS3		Kaskattama River Aerodrome	Kaskattama River	Manitoba
CAS4		Fort Langley Water Aerodrome	Fort Langley	British Columbia
CAS5		Qualicum Beach (Aerosmith Heli Service) Heliport	Qualicum Beach	British Columbia
CAS6		Casselman/Nation River Water Aerodrome	Casselman	Ontario
CAS8		Garden Bay/Sakinaw Lake South Water Aerodrome	Agamemnon Channel	British Columbia
CAT1		Atwood/Coghlin Airport	Atwood	Ontario
CAT4	XQU	Qualicum Beach Airport	Qualicum Beach	British Columbia
CAT5	YMP	Port McNeill Airport	Port McNeill	British Columbia
CAT6		Campbell River (Campbell River & District Hospital) Heliport	Campbell River	British Columbia
CAT7		Lasqueti Island/False Bay Water Aerodrome	Lasqueti Island	British Columbia
CAU3		Oliver Municipal Airport	Oliver	British Columbia
CAU4		Vanderhoof Airport	Vanderhoof	British Columbia
CAU6		Gold River Water Aerodrome	Gold River	British Columbia
CAU8	YRN	Rivers Inlet Water Aerodrome	Rivers Inlet	British Columbia
CAV2		Antler Valley Farm Heliport	Red Deer County	Alberta
CAV3		100 Mile House Airport	100 Mile House	British Columbia
CAV4		McBride/Charlie Leake Field Aerodrome	McBride	British Columbia
CAV5	YTG	Sullivan Bay Water Aerodrome	Sullivan Bay	British Columbia
CAV7		Mansons Landing Water Aerodrome	Mansons Landing	British Columbia
CAV8		Shawnigan Lake Water Aerodrome	Shawnigan Lake	British Columbia
CAV9		Oak Hammock Air Park Airport	Oak Hammock Marsh	Manitoba
CAW3		Airdrie/Waldhof Heliport	Airdrie	Alberta
CAW4		Whistler (Hospital) Heliport	Whistler	British Columbia
CAW5		Port Hardy Water Aerodrome	Port Hardy	British Columbia
CAW6		Fort Ware Water Aerodrome	Kwadacha	British Columbia
CAW8	YSX	Bella Bella/Shearwater Water Aerodrome	Shearwater	British Columbia
CAW9		Whaletown Water Aerodrome	Whaletown	British Columbia
CAX5		Likely Aerodrome	Likely	British Columbia
CAX6	YGG	Ganges Water Aerodrome	Ganges	British Columbia
CAX8		Smithers/Tyhee Lake Water Aerodrome	Smithers	British Columbia
CAY4	YTB	Hartley Bay Water Aerodrome	Hartley Bay	British Columbia
CAY5		Ayr/Eagle Valley Private Airfield	Ayr	Ontario
CAY9		Winfield (Wood Lake) Water Aerodrome	Winfield	British Columbia
CAZ3		Takla Landing Water Aerodrome	Takla Landing	British Columbia
CAZ5		Cache Creek Airport	Cache Creek	British Columbia
CAZ6		Fort St. James/Stuart River Water Aerodrome	Fort St. James	British Columbia
