= Maple Bay, British Columbia =

Town on Vancouver Island, Canada

Coordinates: 48°49′N 123°36′W

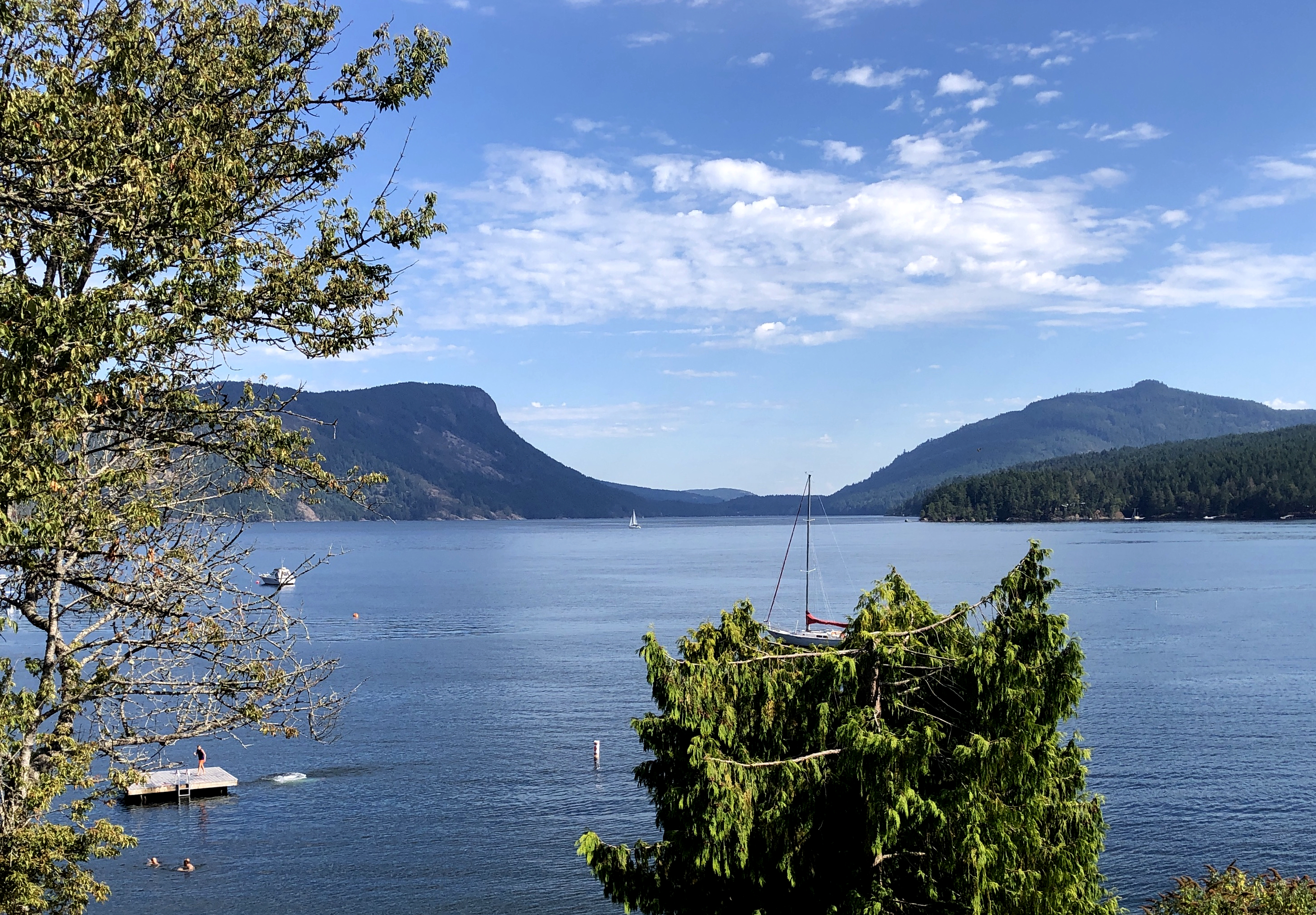
Maple Bay, British Columbia

Maple Bay is a seaside community located in the Cowichan Valley of southern Vancouver Island, British Columbia, Canada. A narrow inlet and surrounded by smooth, pebbled beaches, Maple Bay is home to marine activity all year round. Maple Bay is a small town with a population of 2,640.

The sheltered haven of Maple Bay is situated halfway up Sansum Narrows, which separates Vancouver Island from Saltspring Island, the largest and nearest of the southern Gulf Islands.

Maple Bay is serviced by floatplane, Salt Spring Air and Harbour Air Seaplanes that fly regular scheduled flights several times a day from Maple Bay Marina, to Ganges (Ganges Water Aerodrome) on Saltspring Island and then on to Vancouver (Vancouver International Water Airport/Vancouver International Airport and Vancouver Harbour Flight Centre).

There are three commercial marinas, a public dock, as well as the Maple Bay Yacht Club and the Maple Bay Rowing Club.

Maple Bay Marina is replacing many older boat sheds with new style, fire resistant yacht enclosures, creating one of the safest and most environmentally responsible marinas in British Columbia. Maple Bay Marina has also been recognised with an Eco-Rating of 5 anchors for their Environmental Best Practices by the Georgia Strait Alliance Clean Marine program.
