= West Coast Air =

Canadian airline

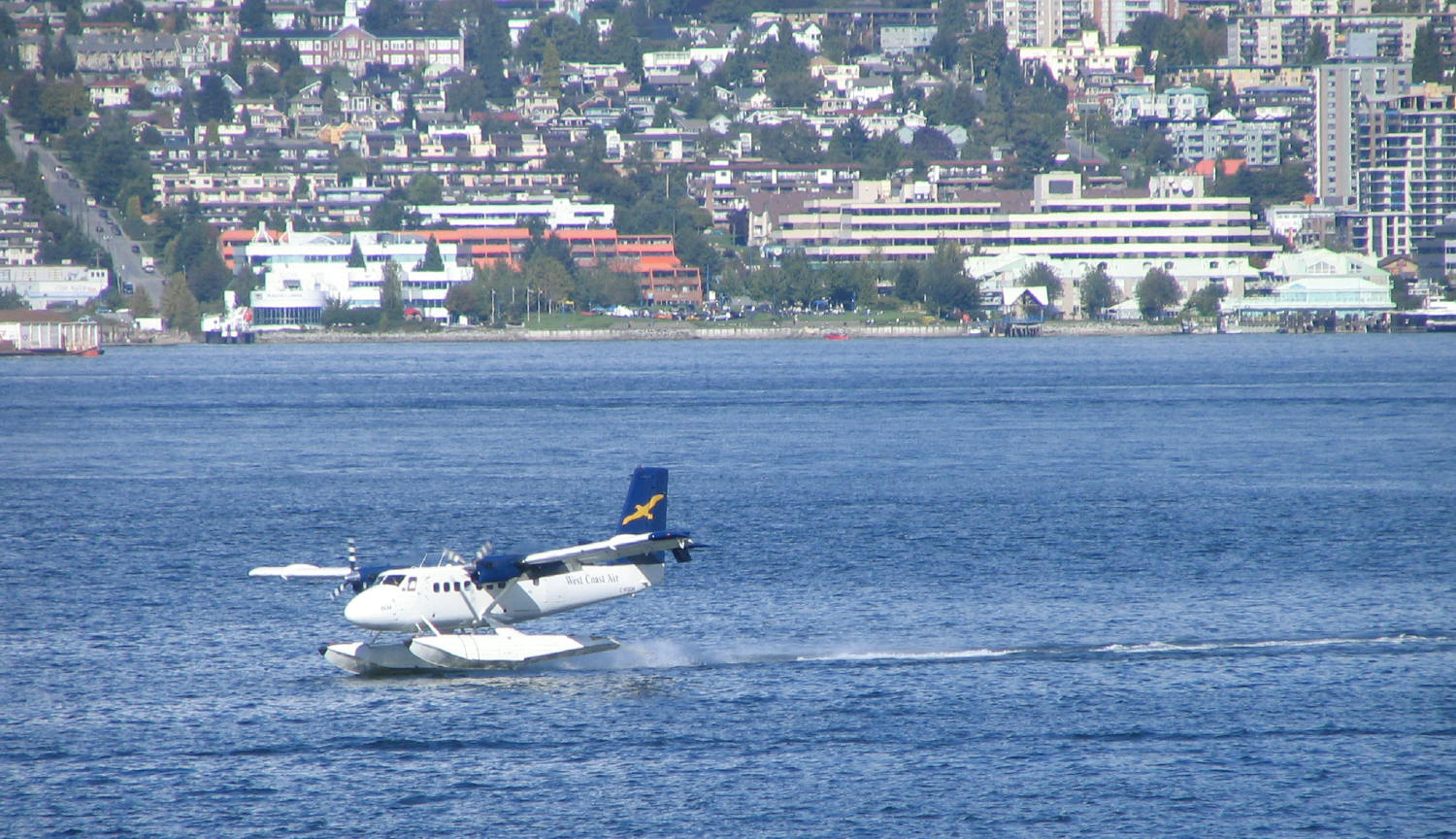
IATA	ICAO	Call sign
–	–	COAST AIR
- Founded: 1996
- Ceased operations: 2015
- Hubs: Vancouver Harbour Aerodrome
- Secondary hubs: Vancouver Int'l Aerodrome; Victoria Inner Harbour Airport; Nanaimo Harbour Aerodrome
- Fleet size: 3
- Destinations: 7
- Parent company: Harbour Air Seaplanes
- Headquarters: Vancouver, British Columbia
- Website: www.harbourair.com

West Coast Air was a Canadian scheduled airline operating de Havilland Canada DHC-6 Twin Otter float planes, which was integrated into Harbour Air Seaplanes.

== History ==
Harbour Air Seaplanes of Vancouver acquired West Coast Air and consolidated the two airlines' terminal and services on March 31, 2010. All aircraft were transferred to Harbour Air Seaplanes, the West Coast Air name was dropped and the Harbour Air name painted on all aircraft.

When it operated the company offered flights from downtown Vancouver and the Richmond floatplane base at Vancouver International Airport to Victoria, Nanaimo, Comox, the Sunshine Coast, and Whistler. The company also flew tours and private charters.

== Destinations ==
Destinations in February 2010, operated for Harbour Air Seaplanes:

- Comox
- Jervis Inlet (Earl's Cove, Chatterbox Falls)
- Nanaimo Harbour Water Aerodrome (Nanaimo)
- Sechelt
- Vancouver Harbour Water Aerodrome (Vancouver)
- Vancouver International Water Aerodrome (Richmond)
- Victoria Inner Harbour Airport (Victoria)
- Whistler (May to September)

== Fleet ==
In June 2015 the West Coast Air fleet was integrated into Harbour Air and painted in the Harbour Air aircraft livery.

== Accidents ==
- On 1 November 2000 a company de Havilland Canada DHC-6 Twin Otter had just departed the Vancouver Harbour Water Aerodrome en route to Victoria when its number 2 engine failed at 50 to 100 ft (15 to 30 m). Even though the aircraft was being flown above V_{MC} it impacted the water about 25 seconds later in a nose-down, right wing-low attitude. The two crew members and 15 passengers all escaped unharmed and were rescued by local watercraft present in the harbour. The Transportation Safety Board of Canada concluded that "Since most air taxi and commuter operators use their own aircraft rather than a simulator for pilot proficiency training, higher-risk emergency scenarios can only be practiced at altitude and discussed in the classroom. As a result, pilots do not gain the benefit of a realistic experience during training." As a result of this accident the company revised its training programs with "increased emphasis on aircraft handling and emergency procedures in response to loss of power at low altitude and low airspeed."

== See also ==
- List of seaplane operators
- List of defunct airlines of Canada
