= Lighthouse Pub =

Coordinates: 49.481143°N 123.75782°W

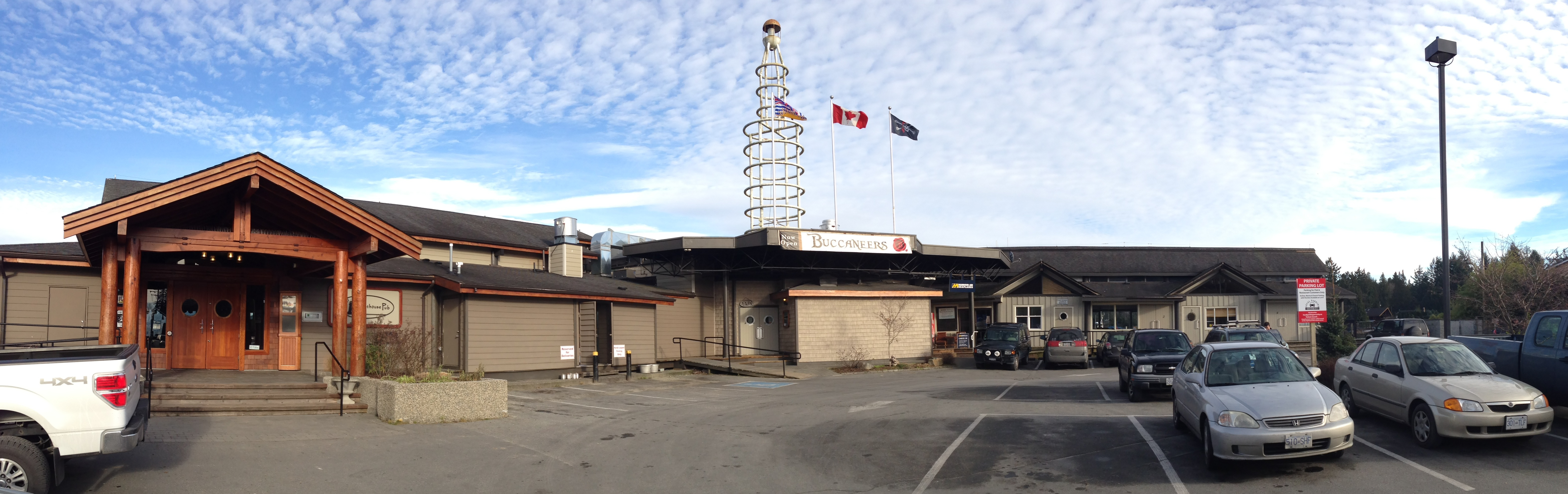
- Lighthouse Pub
- Interactive map of the Lighthouse Pub area
- Former names: China Gate Cafe

General information
- Type: Pub / Restaurant / Marina / Float Plane Base
- Location: Sechelt, British Columbia, 5764 Wharf Avenue
- Construction started: November 1987
- Completed: June 1988
- Renovated: April 2006

Technical details
- Structural system: Post & Beam Wood Structure

The Lighthouse Pub is a Transportation Corridor / Restaurant and Pub at the southern tip of Sechelt Inlet. The building was originally a restaurant from Expo 86 and has since been slowly transformed into an air and sea gateway to Sechelt.

== History ==
First mention of the proposed pub was made in the Coast News newspaper, in the March 24, 1986 edition. However, no mention was made of the name or type of building that would be built, with only the location being indicated as the shores of Porpoise Bay.

The Lighthouse Pub located in Sechelt, BC is one of few remaining restaurant buildings from Expo 86. The building was formerly the China Gate Restaurant during the exposition and was purchased by Sechelt Developer Len Van Egmond during the auction of buildings after the closing of the exposition.

The "Lighthouse" motif that stands on top of the building were actually part of the space-themed McDonald's. Len Van Egmond saw the spaceship and thought that could be made into a lighthouse with some modification.

The complex was incorrectly identified as the Munich Festhaus in the book VANCOUVER'S EXPO 86 by Bill Cotter.

== Construction ==
The pilings went into the ground in June 1987 and the building was trucked piece by piece on the Langdale Ferry to the Sunshine Coast, and then to Sechelt via Highway 101. The pub is built half on land and half over the water and was re-opened in June 1988. Previously, the pub location was the Tyee float plane base and a very small marina.

At that time the complex included:

- The Pub
- Rental Space
- Marina
- Float Plane Base

== Renovations ==
A restaurant was built under the lighthouse motif, enclosing a previously open deck, and opened in December 1994. The pub went through major renovations in 2006. The liquor store was moved offsite, the front of the pub was opened up, and the previously small deck was expanded to the entire width of the building. The renovations were completed in 2007.

== Current status ==
The establishment has grown into a typical neighbourhood pub with big screen TVs and weekend live entertainment, and serves a variety of pub fare and local seafood options. The Complex is also unique as it serves as a transportation hub via its marina to the Sechelt Inlet and its float plane base with regular scheduled flights to Vancouver, Richmond, Nanaimo.

The complex currently houses:

- The Lighthouse Pub
- Buccaneers Restaurant
- Lighthouse Marine
- Harbour Air Sechelt Base

== Gallery ==
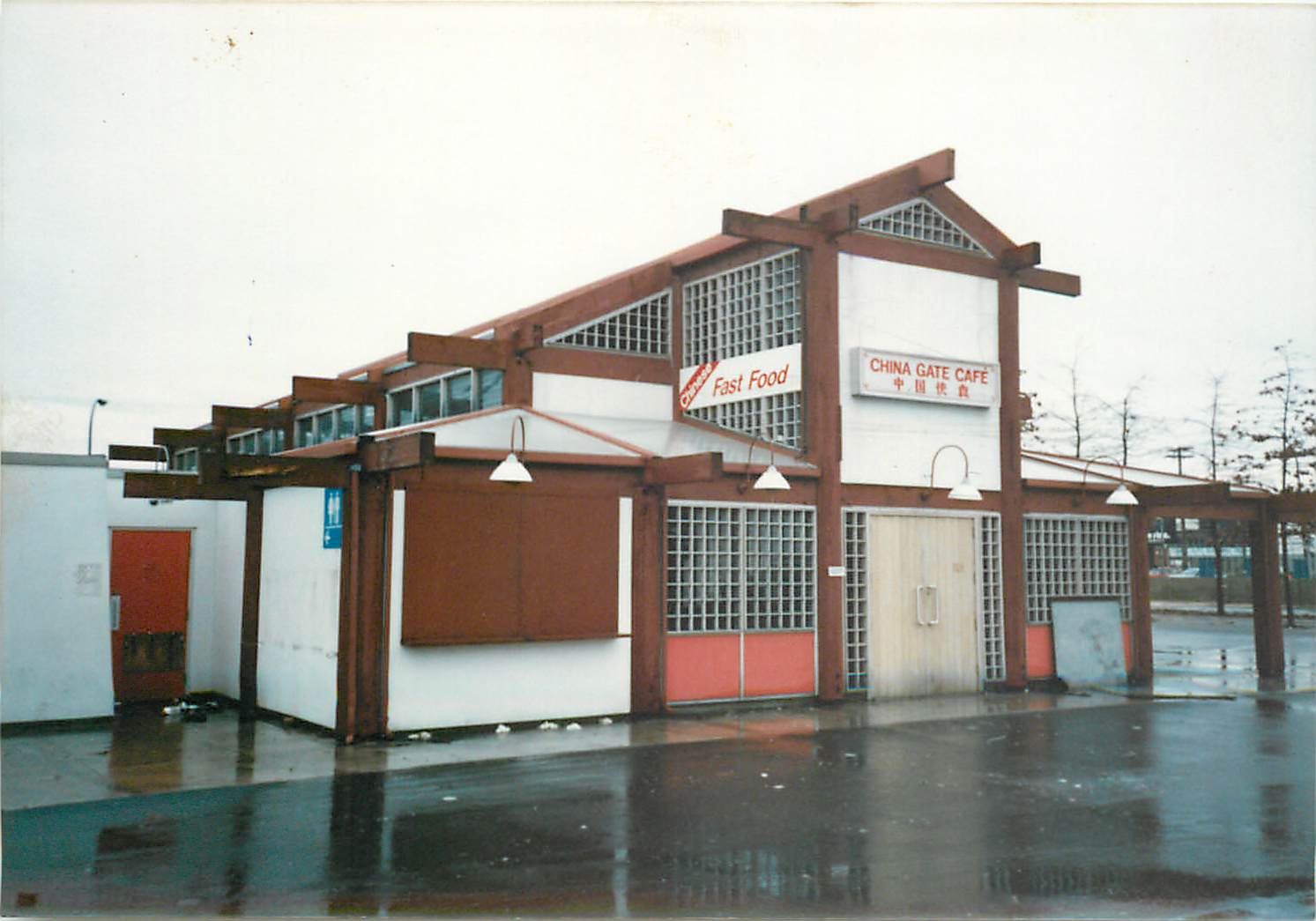
The China Gate Restaurant after the Closure of Expo 86 (Circa October 1986)

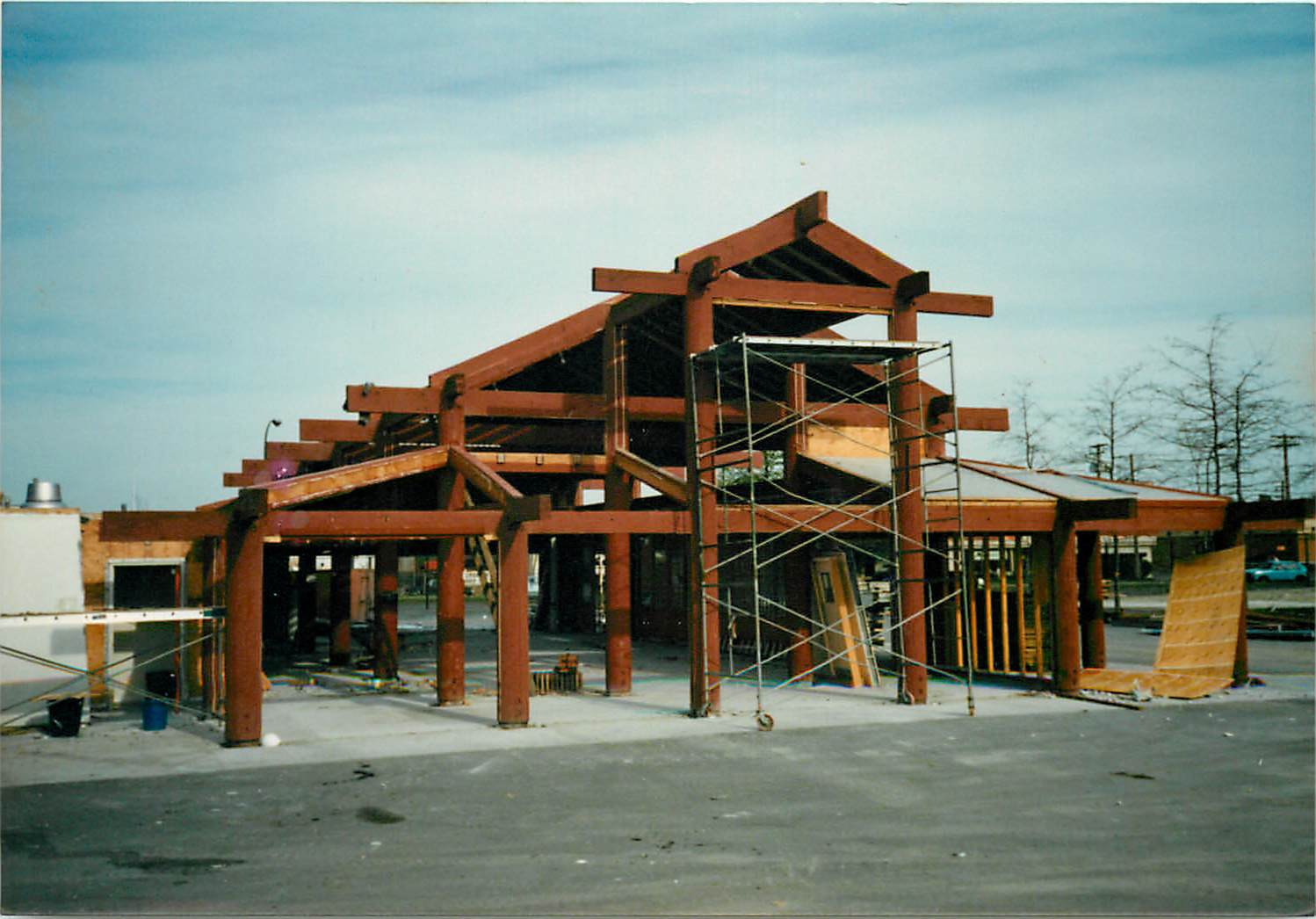
The China Gate Restaurant in preparation for Transportation to Sechelt, BC after the sale to Len Van Egmond (Circa 1986)

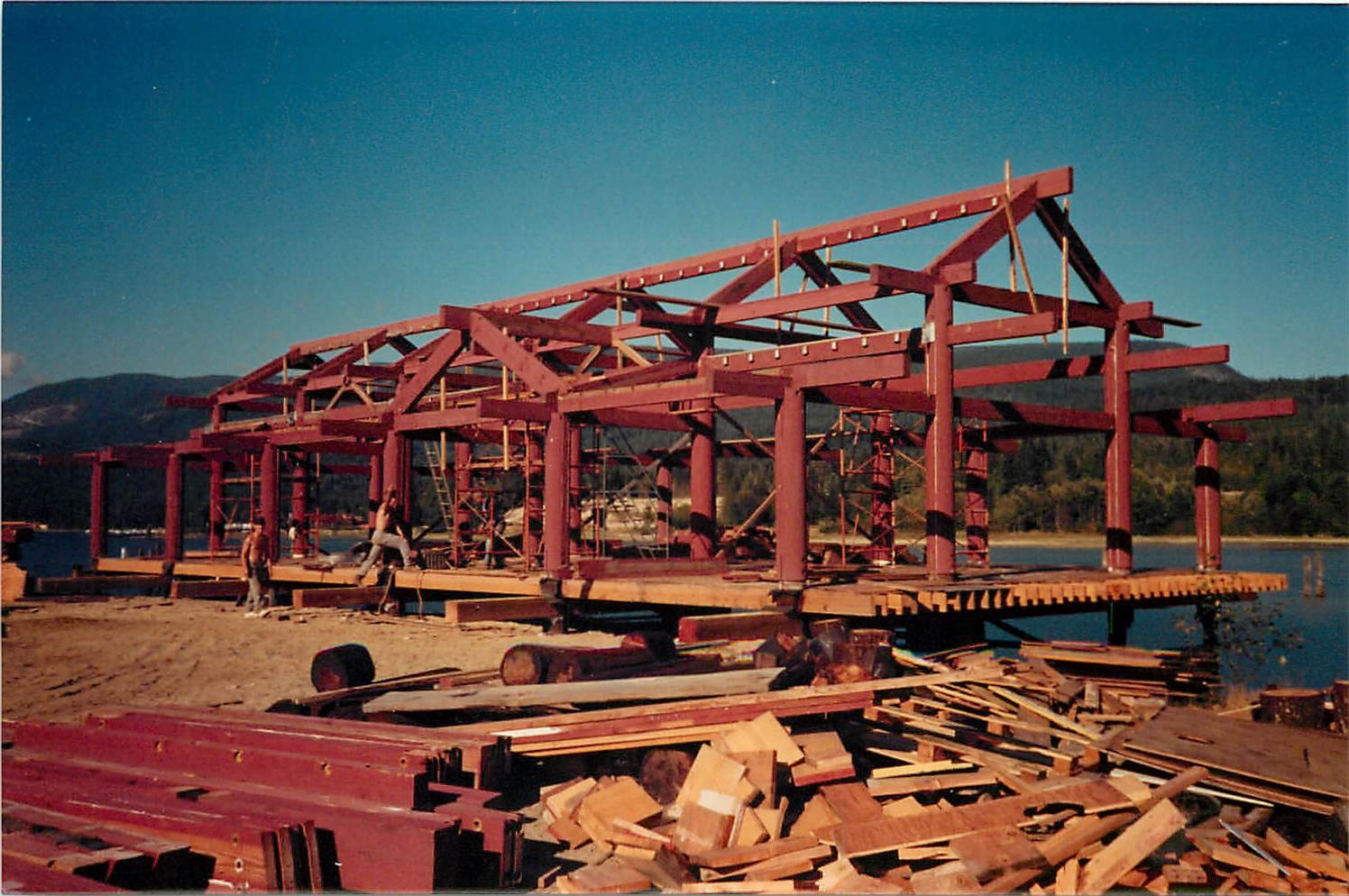
Shortly after the arrival of the new Lighthouse Pub in Sechelt, BC that was formerly the China Gate Restaurant at Expo 86 in Vancouver, BC. (Circa 1987)

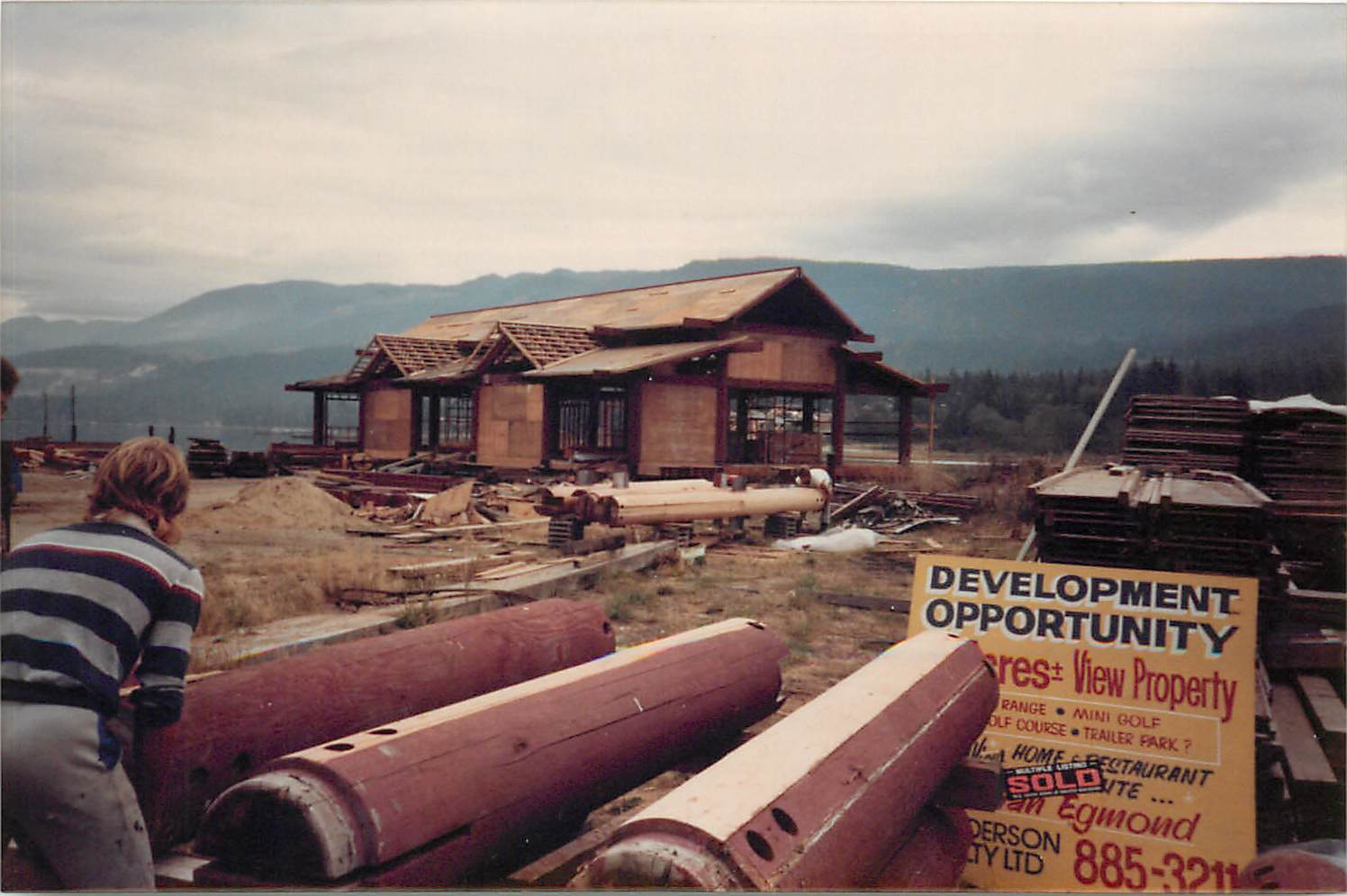
Construction of the new Lighthouse Pub in Sechelt, BC that was formerly the China Gate Restaurant at Expo 86 in Vancouver, BC. (Circa 1987)

The Lighthouse is the former spaceship from an on-site McDonald's (April 2, 2019)

== See also ==
- Sechelt Aerodrome
- Harbour Air
- Expo 86
- Sechelt Inlet
- Porpoise Bay Provincial Park
