= Comox Water Aerodrome =

Seaplane base in Comox, British Columbia, Canada

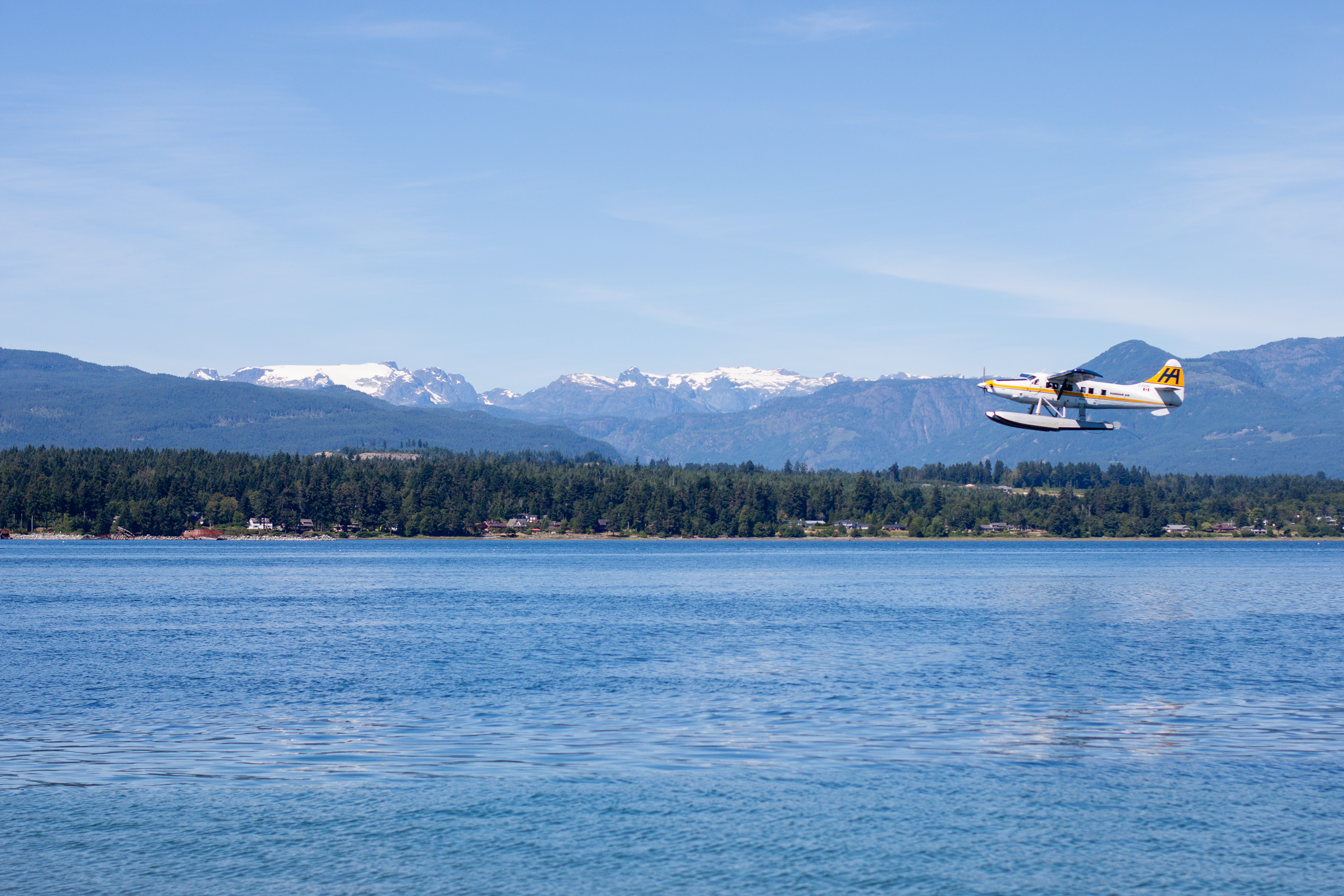
- De Havilland Canada DHC-3 Otter of Harbour Air taking off at Comox Harbour
- IATA: none; ICAO: none; TC LID: CCX6

Summary
- Airport type: Public
- Operator: Comox Bay Marina
- Location: Comox, British Columbia
- Time zone: PST (UTC−08:00)
  - Summer (DST): PDT (UTC−07:00)
- Elevation AMSL: 0 ft / 0 m
- Coordinates: 49°40′14″N 124°55′57″W

Map
- Location in British Columbia CCX6 (Canada)

Runways
Direction	Length		Surface
Direction	ft	m	Surface
n/a	n/a	n/a	Water
- Source: Water Aerodrome Supplement

Comox Water Aerodrome (TC LID: CCX6) is located adjacent to Comox, British Columbia, Canada. The only air operations in the Comox Bay Marina are West Coast Air's three times a day service and Harbour Air's service to Vancouver.

== Airlines and destinations ==
Airlines	Destinations
Harbour Air	Vancouver Harbour

== See also ==
- List of airports on Vancouver Island
