= Vancouver International Water Airport =

- IATA: none; ICAO: none; TC LID: CAM9

Summary
- Airport type: Public
- Operator: Vancouver International Airport Authority; Seair Service
- Serves: Greater Vancouver
- Location: Richmond, British Columbia
- Time zone: MST (UTC−07:00)
- Elevation AMSL: 0 ft (0 m)
- Coordinates: 49°11′N 123°10′W

Map
- Location in Metro Vancouver CAM9 (British Columbia) CAM9 (Canada)

Runways
Direction	Length		Surface
Direction	ft	m	Surface
n/a	n/a	n/a	Water
- Source: Water Aerodrome Supplement

Vancouver International Water Airport (TC LID: CAM9) is located adjacent to Vancouver International Airport in Richmond, British Columbia, Canada.

It is classified as an airport and as an airport of entry by Nav Canada and is staffed by the Canada Border Services Agency (CBSA). CBSA officers at this airport can handle general aviation aircraft only, with no more than 15 passengers.

The aerodrome has two docks, located at 4760 Inglis Drive, one operated by Harbour Air and the other by Seair Seaplanes. Floatplanes can be fairly easily transferred to Vancouver International Airport via a ramp and gate.

== Airlines and destinations ==
Airlines	Destinations
Corilair	Campbell River
Gulf Island Seaplanes	Gabriola Island
Harbour Air	Bedwell Harbour, Ganges, Nanaimo–Harbour, Sechelt, Victoria–Harbour, Whistler/Green Lake, Powell River
Helijet	Nanaimo–Harbour, Victoria–Harbour
Pacific Seaplanes	Bamfield, Galiano Island, Miners Bay, Port Alberni, Port Washington, Thetis Island, Ucluelet
Salt Spring Air	Ganges, Maple Bay
Seair Seaplanes	Bedwell Harbour, Ganges, Nanaimo–Harbour, Sechelt, Victoria–Harbour
Sunshine Coast Air	Nanaimo–Harbour, Sechelt
Tofino Air	Charter: Tofino

== See also ==
- List of airports in the Lower Mainland
