= Mayne Island Water Aerodrome =

Former aerodrome in Mayne Island, British Columbia

- IATA: YAV; ICAO: none

Summary
- Airport type: Public
- Owner: Mayne Island CRD
- Operator: CRD
- Serves: Mayne Island
- Location: Mayne Island, British Columbia
- Time zone: PST (UTC−08:00)
  - Summer (DST): PDT (UTC−07:00)
- Elevation AMSL: 2 ft (0.61 m)
- Coordinates: 48°52′N 123°18′W

Map
- Location in British Columbia CAW7 (Canada)

Runways
Direction	Length		Surface
Direction	ft	m	Surface
West	36	12	Water
- Source: Water Aerodrome Supplement

Mayne Island Water Aerodrome, formerly IATA: YAV, TC LID: CAW7, is a defunct aerodrome that was located at Miners Bay adjacent to Mayne Island in British Columbia, Canada. Mayne Island is one of the southern Gulf Islands.

== Airlines and destinations ==
Although the aerodrome is no longer registered with Transport Canada and is classified as defunct it still has scheduled flights. In this case defunct means that it no longer meets Transport Canada standards, not that the area is no longer in operation.

Airlines	Destinations
Seair Seaplanes	Vancouver
Saltspring Air	Vancouver

== History ==
The dock was constructed at an unspecified time in the 20th century. It was built to harbor boats and serve as a communal fishing area. Some time around 2000 the aerodrome portion was built.

== See also ==
- List of airports in the Gulf Islands
