= Port Alberni Water Aerodrome =

- IATA: none; ICAO: none; TC LID: CPW9

Summary
- Airport type: Public
- Operator: Pacific Seaplanes
- Location: Port Alberni, British Columbia
- Time zone: PST (UTC−08:00)
  - Summer (DST): PDT (UTC−07:00)
- Elevation AMSL: 0 ft / 0 m
- Coordinates: 49°14′08″N 124°49′03″W

Map
- Location in British Columbia CPW9 (Canada)

Runways
Direction	Length		Surface
Direction	ft	m	Surface
n/a	n/a	n/a	Water
- Source: Water Aerodrome Supplement

Port Alberni Water Aerodrome (TC LID: CPW9) is located in Alberni Inlet, adjacent to Port Alberni, British Columbia, Canada.

== Airlines and destinations ==
Airlines	Destinations
Pacific Seaplanes	Ucluelet, Vancouver

== See also ==
- List of airports on Vancouver Island
