= Bedwell Harbour Water Aerodrome =

- IATA: YBW; ICAO: none; TC LID: CAB3

Summary
- Airport type: Private
- Operator: Canada Border Services Agency
- Location: Bedwell Harbour, British Columbia
- Time zone: PST (UTC−08:00)
  - Summer (DST): PDT (UTC−07:00)
- Elevation AMSL: 0 ft / 0 m
- Coordinates: 48°45′N 123°14′W

Map
- Location in British Columbia CAB3 (Canada)

Runways
Direction	Length		Surface
Direction	ft	m	Surface
n/a	n/a	n/a	Water
- Source: Water Aerodrome Supplement

Bedwell Harbour Water Aerodrome (IATA: YBW, TC LID: CAB3) is located on Bedwell Harbour, British Columbia, Canada, in the southern part of Pender Island in the Gulf Islands.

The airport is classified as an airport of entry by Nav Canada and is staffed by the Canada Border Services Agency (CBSA) on a call-out basis from the Victoria International Airport. CBSA officers at this airport can handle general aviation aircraft only, with no more than 15 passengers.

== Airlines and destinations ==
Airlines	Destinations
Harbour Air Seaplanes	Vancouver
Saltspring Air	Vancouver

== See also ==
- List of airports in the Gulf Islands
