= Ganges Water Aerodrome =

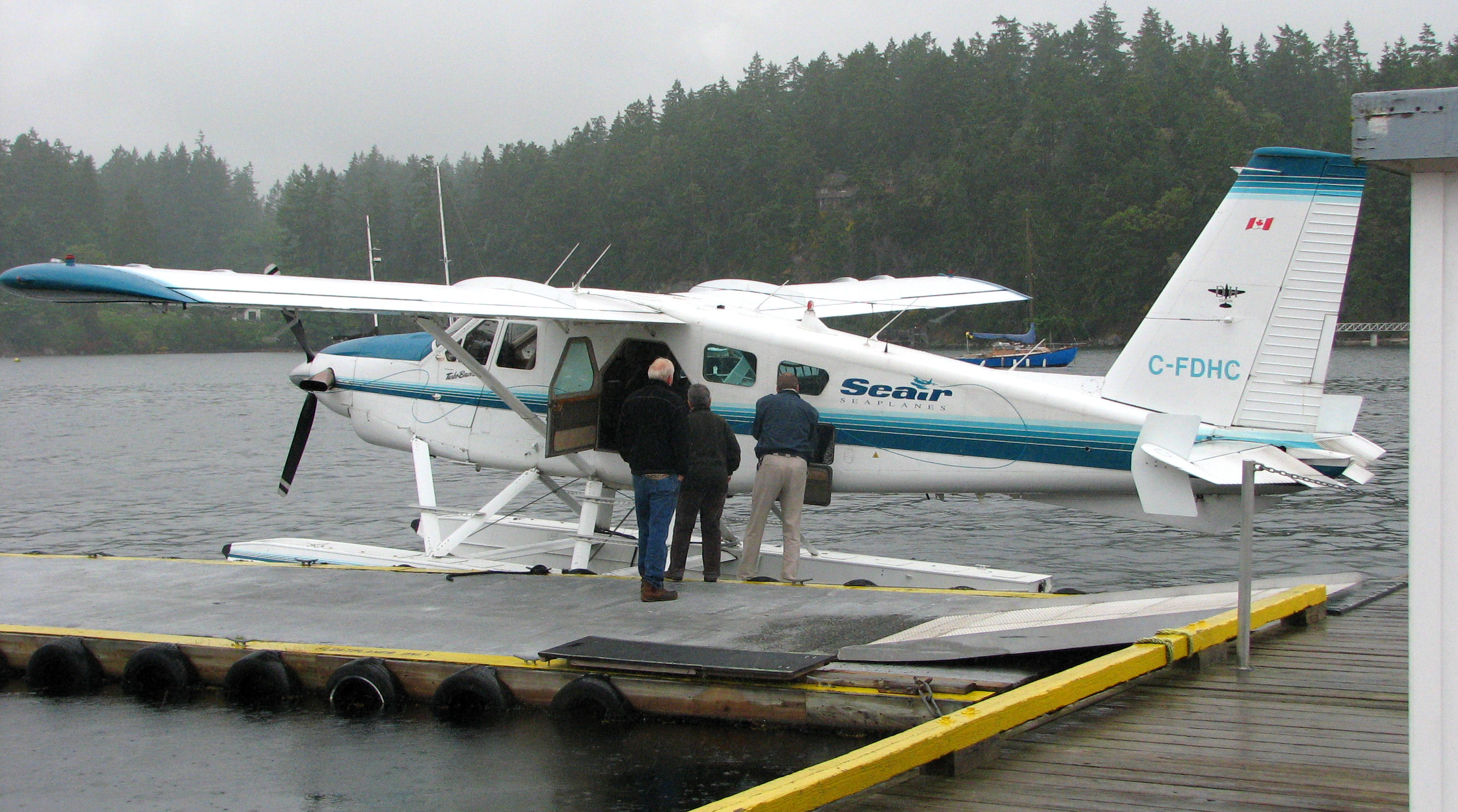
- Seair Seaplanes, DHC-2T "Turbo Beaver"
- IATA: YGG; ICAO: none; TC LID: CAX6

Summary
- Airport type: Private
- Operator: Salt Spring Harbour Authority
- Location: Ganges, Salt Spring Island, British Columbia
- Time zone: PST (UTC−08:00)
  - Summer (DST): PDT (UTC−07:00)
- Elevation AMSL: 0 ft / 0 m
- Coordinates: 48°51′N 123°30′W

Map
- Location in British Columbia CAX6 (Canada)

Runways
Direction	Length		Surface
Direction	ft	m	Surface
n/a	n/a	n/a	Water
- Source: Water Aerodrome Supplement

Ganges Water Aerodrome (IATA: YGG, TC LID: CAX6) is located 1 nautical mile (1.9 km; 1.2 mi) southeast of Ganges on Saltspring Island in British Columbia, Canada.

== Airlines and destinations ==
Airlines	Destinations
Harbour Air Seaplanes	Vancouver Airport, Vancouver Harbour, Victoria Harbour
Salt Spring Air	Vancouver Airport, Vancouver Harbour
Seair Seaplanes	Vancouver Airport

== See also ==
- List of airports in the Gulf Islands
