= McBride/Charlie Leake Field Aerodrome =

- IATA: none; ICAO: none; TC LID: CAV4

Summary
- Airport type: Public
- Owner: Village of McBride
- Operator: Village of McBride
- Location: McBride, British Columbia
- Time zone: PST (UTC−08:00)
  - Summer (DST): PDT (UTC−07:00)
- Elevation AMSL: 2,367 ft / 721 m
- Coordinates: 53°18′53″N 120°10′11″W

Map
- Location in British Columbia

Runways
Direction	Length		Surface
Direction	ft	m	Surface
12/30	2,707	825	Asphalt
- Source

McBride/Charlie Leake Field Aerodrome (TC LID: CAV4) is on the southwest side of the Fraser River about 1 nautical mile (1.9 km; 1.2 mi) north-northwest of McBride, British Columbia, Canada.

== Earlier activity ==
In the early 1920s, an Air Board de Havilland DH-4 landed at McDonald's farm. In April 1929, a Cessna AW made an emergency landing in a field. Muddy conditions made a departure that day impossible, but the ground freezing overnight allowed a successful takeoff next morning. That July, USAAC Capt. Russ G. Hoyt experienced engine trouble with his Curtiss Hawk XP-6B. Gliding into a field of soft sand, the right wheel struck a mound, turning the aircraft upside down.

== Airstrip to the southeast ==
In 1951, a 910-by-150-metre (3,000 by 500 ft) field donated by Adolph Jeck was selected for the airstrip. The east–west alignment was on the east side of the river, about 2.9 nautical miles (5.4 km; 3.3 mi) southeast of the village on Jeck Rd.

Despite expectations, construction activities were not completed by fall. In the following spring, donations and volunteer labour resumed the work.

In August 1952, a Cessna 170 was the first aircraft to land on the completed runway.

== Airstrip to the north ==
In the early 1960s, this longer airfield replaced the former one.

In 1972, the airport received a $40,000 federal grant. In 1978, an $83,000 provincial grant enabled a 150-metre (500 ft) runway extension and paving of the apron and taxiway. However, the runway was still too short for medevacs.

In 1983, the village council approved the erection of a new hangar large enough to house two planes. The next year, the runway was repaved and drainage improved.

In 1990, Prince George consultants undertook an airport expansion study. In 1992, a Rapattack base, which included helicopter facilities, storage and employee accommodation, was established for dealing with wildfires in the area. In 1995, a new helicopter hangar was erected. In 1997, McBride received a grant for Phases I and II of the airport upgrade.

During McBride's 75th Anniversary celebrations in 2007, the airport was renamed to honour resident Lieutenant Colonel Charles (Charlie) Leake.

In 2016, the airport received a $20,887 grant for runway rehabilitation. By 2019, the runway still could not accommodate the fixed wing aircraft used for medevacs. Patients triaged in McBride were transported to Prince George by helicopter or ground ambulance.

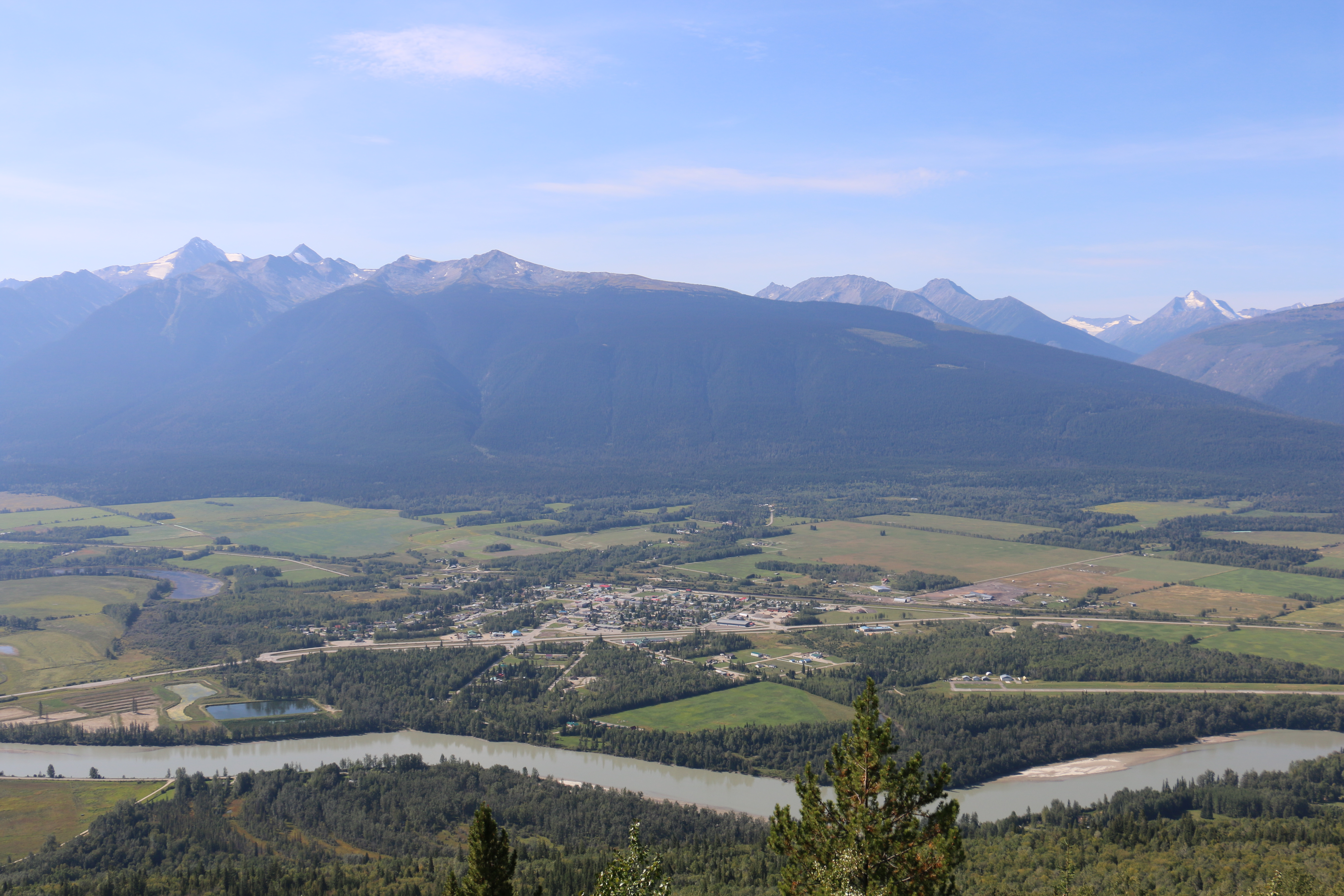
At lower right, south end of airport, McBride, 2013.

A $75,000 grant was applied in 2020 to install an Automatic Weather Observing System (AWOS), which monitors current conditions. In 2021, the airport received a $401,687 grant to replace access road culverts. In 2023, a $259,000 grant was applied to runway and taxiway maintenance and replacing a damaged culvert.

The village owns and operates the airport and employs a part time airport manager. Infrastructure includes several private hangars, the provincial forestry Rapattack base, and bulk aviation fuel storage.

The immediate goal is to extend the runway 240 metres (800 ft). The long-term strategy is a 1,100-metre (3,500 ft) total length, and basing rotary wing aircraft at the north end of the runway and fixed wing at the south end. Erecting a terminal containing a waiting room, indoor washrooms, and pilot lounge is desirable.

== Accidents and incidents ==
- August 1962: A Cessna Crane overshot the runway on landing and proceeded through the adjacent fields. This was the ninth incident on the short airstrip. Six weeks earlier a Cessna 180 had struck a marker and flipped.
- September 1975: A small plane experienced engine trouble on takeoff and crashed into some willows.
