= Seair Seaplanes =

Scheduled and charter airline based in Richmond, British Columbia, Canada

IATA	ICAO	Call sign
-	—	-
- Founded: 1980
- AOC #: 5082
- Hubs: Vancouver Int'l Water Airport
- Fleet size: 14
- Destinations: 9
- Headquarters: Richmond, British Columbia, Canada
- Key people: Peter Clarke, CEO
- Website: www.seairseaplanes.com

Seair Seaplanes is a scheduled and charter airline based in Richmond, British Columbia, Canada. The airline flies routes between the Vancouver International Water Airport and the Nanaimo Harbour Water Airport, as well as other Gulf Islands in the Strait of Georgia, exclusively with float planes.

== Destinations ==
As of September 2019 Seair Seaplanes serves the following destinations in British Columbia:

- Galiano Island (Montague Harbour Water Aerodrome)
- Mayne Island (Mayne Island Water Aerodrome)
- Nanaimo (Nanaimo Harbour Water Aerodrome)
- Pender Island (Port Washington Water Aerodrome)
- Richmond (Vancouver International Water Airport)
- Salt Spring Island (Ganges Water Aerodrome)
- Saturna Island (Lyall Harbour)
- Thetis Island (Telegraph Harbour)
- Vancouver (Vancouver Harbour Flight Centre)

In addition to scheduled flights, Seair operates scenic flights, scheduled tours, and private charters. Small amounts of cargo may also be carried.

Seair had plans to begin a service to the Victoria Inner Harbour Airport on May 25, 2011, but the service did not debut.

== Fleet ==
As of September 2019 the Seair fleet consists of 14 aircraft equipped with floats:

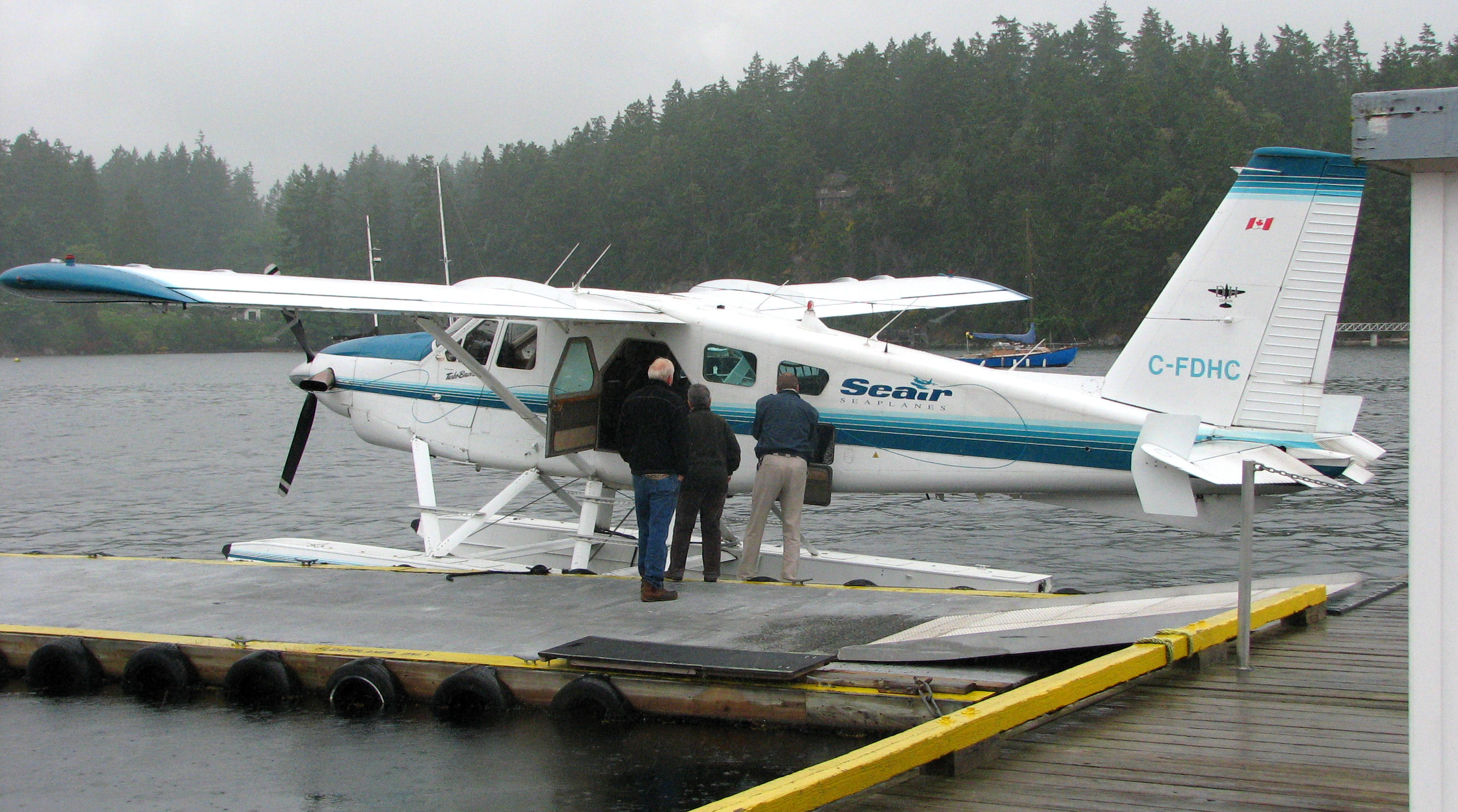
DHC-2T "Turbo Beaver" unloading at Ganges Harbour

Seair Seaplanes fleet
Aircraft	Number	Variants	Notes
Cessna 185 Skywagon	1	A185F	3 passengers
Cessna 208 Caravan	7		9 passengers
DHC-2 Beaver	6	DHC-2 MK. I, DHC-2 MK. III	

== Accidents ==
- On 28 December 1999, a Cessna C-208 Caravan (C-FGGG) operated by Seair crashed shortly after takeoff from the Abbotsford International Airport. The aircraft was destroyed and the pilot received serious injuries. Two passengers were also seriously injured and three passengers received minor injuries.
- On 22 September 2000, a DHC-2T Turbo Beaver (C-FOES) operated by Seair crashed 18 nautical miles northwest of Clearwater, British Columbia. The two occupants were seriously injured and the aircraft was destroyed.
- On 29 November 2009, a DHC-2 Beaver operated by Seair crashed off the coast of Saturna Island. The accident occurred at approximately 4:10 p.m local time. Six passengers (including one infant) died, but the pilot and one other passenger survived.
- On 26 July 2019, a Cessna 208 Caravan (C-GURL) registered to Seair crashed near Addenbroke Island, about 100 km (62 mi) north of Port Hardy. There were nine passengers on board and one pilot. Three passengers and the pilot were killed and five passengers suffered serious injuries.

== See also ==
- List of seaplane operators
