= Powell Lake Water Aerodrome =

- IATA: WPL; ICAO: none; TC LID: CAQ8

Summary
- Airport type: Public
- Operator: City of Powell River
- Serves: Powell River, British Columbia
- Location: Powell Lake, Sunshine Coast
- Time zone: PST (UTC−08:00)
  - Summer (DST): PDT (UTC−07:00)
- Elevation AMSL: 183 ft / 56 m
- Coordinates: 49°53′06″N 124°32′38″W

Map
- Location in British Columbia CAQ8 (Canada)

Runways
Direction	Length		Surface
Direction	ft	m	Surface
n/a	n/a	n/a	Water
- Source: Water Aerodrome Supplement

Powell Lake Water Aerodrome (IATA: WPL, TC LID: CAQ8) is located on Powell Lake, British Columbia, Canada.

== Airlines and destinations ==
Airlines	Destinations
Harbour Air	Vancouver Harbour Vancouver
