= Harbour Air =

Floatplane airline in British Columbia, Canada

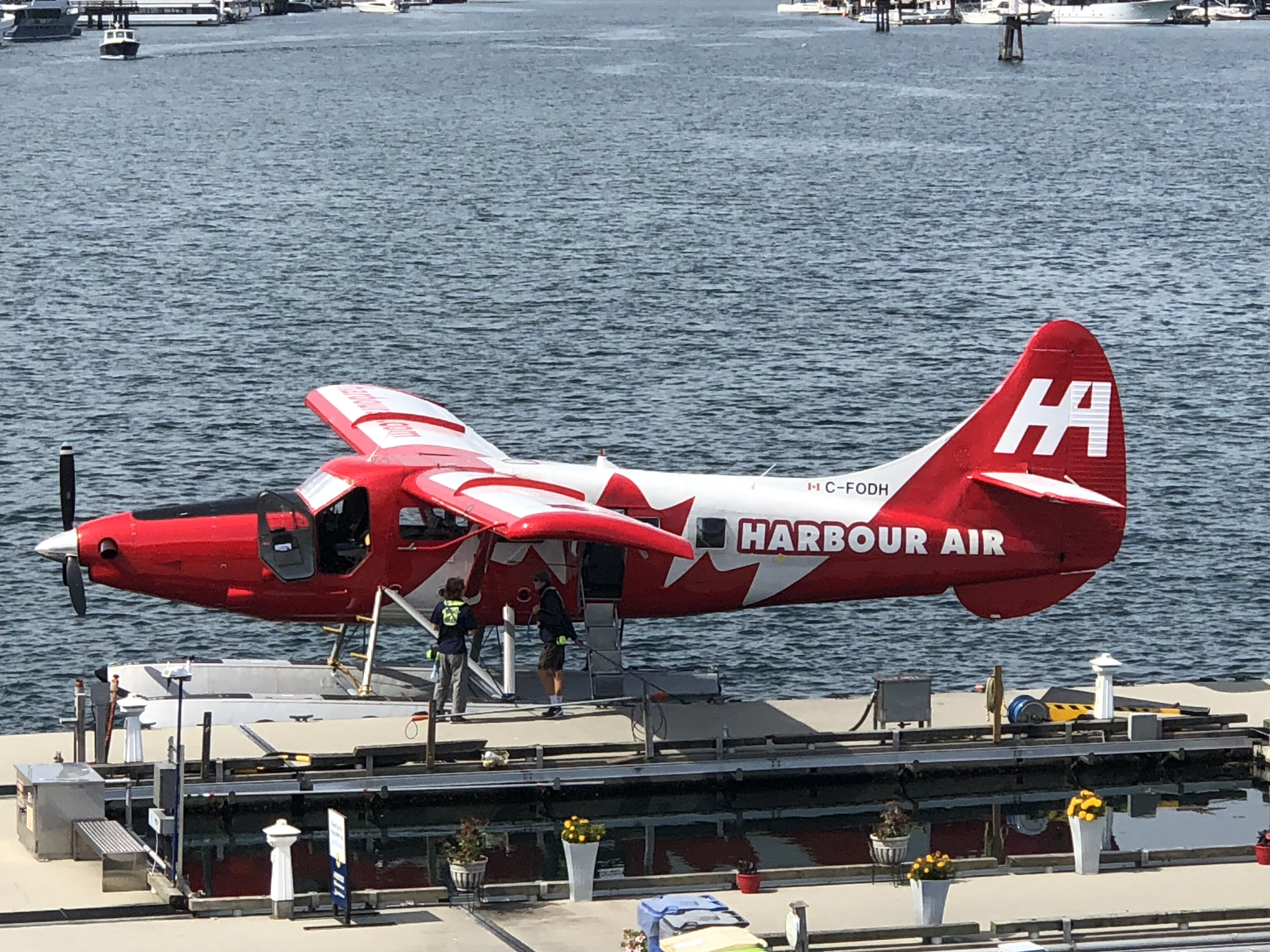
- Harbour Air plane 2023
IATA	CDD	Call sign
YB	HR	HARBOUR EXPRESS
- Founded: 1982
- AOC #: Canada: 4001^{[a]} Tantalus Air: 17401; United States: 1H6F426F
- Hubs: Vancouver Harbour; Vancouver International
- Secondary hubs: Victoria Inner Harbour; Nanaimo Harbour
- Focus cities: Vancouver, Richmond, Victoria, Nanaimo, Sechelt, Comox, Whistler, Gulf Islands
- Frequent-flyer program: High Flyer Rewards, Air Bucks Program, Quickticket Discounts
- Fleet size: 37, 41
- Destinations: 16
- Headquarters: Richmond, British Columbia
- Key people: Bert van der Stege, CEO
- Website: harbourair.com

Harbour Air is a floatplane airline with scheduled, tour, and charter services based in Richmond, British Columbia, Canada. Predominantly operating seaplanes the airline specializes in routes between Vancouver, Nanaimo, Victoria, Sechelt, Comox, Whistler and the Gulf Islands, primarily with de Havilland Canada floatplanes. Harbour Air operates de Havilland Beavers, Otters and Twin Otters.

== History ==
The airline was established and started operations in 1982 as Windoak Air Service to provide seaplane charter services for the forestry industry in British Columbia. In 1993, Harbour Air purchased Trans-Provincial Airlines, added charter flights to resorts, and increased scheduled services. Today, Harbour Air refers to itself as the world's largest all-seaplane airline and became North America's first carbon neutral airline. A small subsidiary, Harbour Air Malta, was set up in June 2007, and a DHC-3 Turbo Otter floatplane is permanently based in Valletta, Malta for scheduled flights to Gozo and sightseeing trips around the islands. Harbour Air Magazine is the official in-flight magazine of Harbour Air.

In 2007, Harbour Air became the first airline in North America to achieve complete carbon neutrality in both flight services and corporate operations. Teamed up with Vancouver-based Offsetters, the airline started to include a carbon offset on each ticket used to mitigate the environmental impact of the greenhouse gas emissions (GHG's) associated with the flight. The funds are invested in renewable energy projects.

On February 16, 2010, Deloitte Canada announced that Harbour Air was a winner of a 2009 Canada's 50 Best Managed Companies Award. This national award is sponsored by Deloitte, Canadian Imperial Bank of Commerce, National Post and Smith School of Business.

On March 31, 2010, Harbour Air completed the acquisition of West Coast Air and consolidated their terminal services.

On May 20, 2011, Harbour Air grounded its service from Victoria Harbour to Langley Regional Airport due to low passenger numbers and fuel price surges.

On May 9, 2012, Harbour Air purchased Whistler Air.

In September 2013, Harbour Air launched a land-based charter carrier, Tantalus Air, which operated one Cessna 182 Skylane as ICAO airline designator TTU, and telephony TANTALUS.

In November 2015, Salt Spring Air was purchased by the Harbour Air Group. Salt Spring Air's fleet now joins Harbour Air, West Coast Air and Whistler Air and now claims to be largest seaplane airline in the world.

Harbour Air and Kenmore Air started a new seaplane service between Downtown Vancouver, and Downtown Seattle on April 26, 2018.

In March 2019, Harbour Air announced a partnership with magniX to electrify the entire Harbour Air fleet over the long term. Harbour Air has noted that its initial electric-powered commercial flights will be on routes of under 30 minutes' duration. The first converted aircraft was a DHC-2 Beaver which serves as the test prototype for the magniX motor, energy storage, and control systems. The prototype flew for the first time on December 10, 2019. The company hopes to have the aircraft certified for commercial use by 2021.

=== Electric aviation ===
In March 2019, Harbour Air announced plans to convert an aircraft to run on electricity, which would serve as a test prototype during a two-year duration regulatory approval process, and eventually hoped to convert its entire fleet to electric propulsion. The first plane to be converted was a de Havilland Canada DHC-2 Beaver.

The electric prototype made its first flight over 4 minutes off the Fraser River near Vancouver on December 10, 2019. The Pratt & Whitney R-985 Wasp Junior piston engine of the six-passenger ePlane was replaced by a 560 kW (750 hp), 135 kg (298 lb) magni500, with swappable batteries allowing 30 minute flights plus 30 minutes of reserve power. Harbour Air wants to convert all its aircraft, including Beavers and Pratt & Whitney Canada PT6-powered Otters and Twin Otters.

Three years later, the plane completed its first point-to-point test flight, from Vancouver to Victoria Airport Water Aerodrome near Sidney on Vancouver Island, on August 18, 2022, travelling 72 km (45 mi) in 24 minutes. The aircraft was displayed at the British Columbia Aviation Museum open house on August 20 the same year.

== Awards and accolades ==
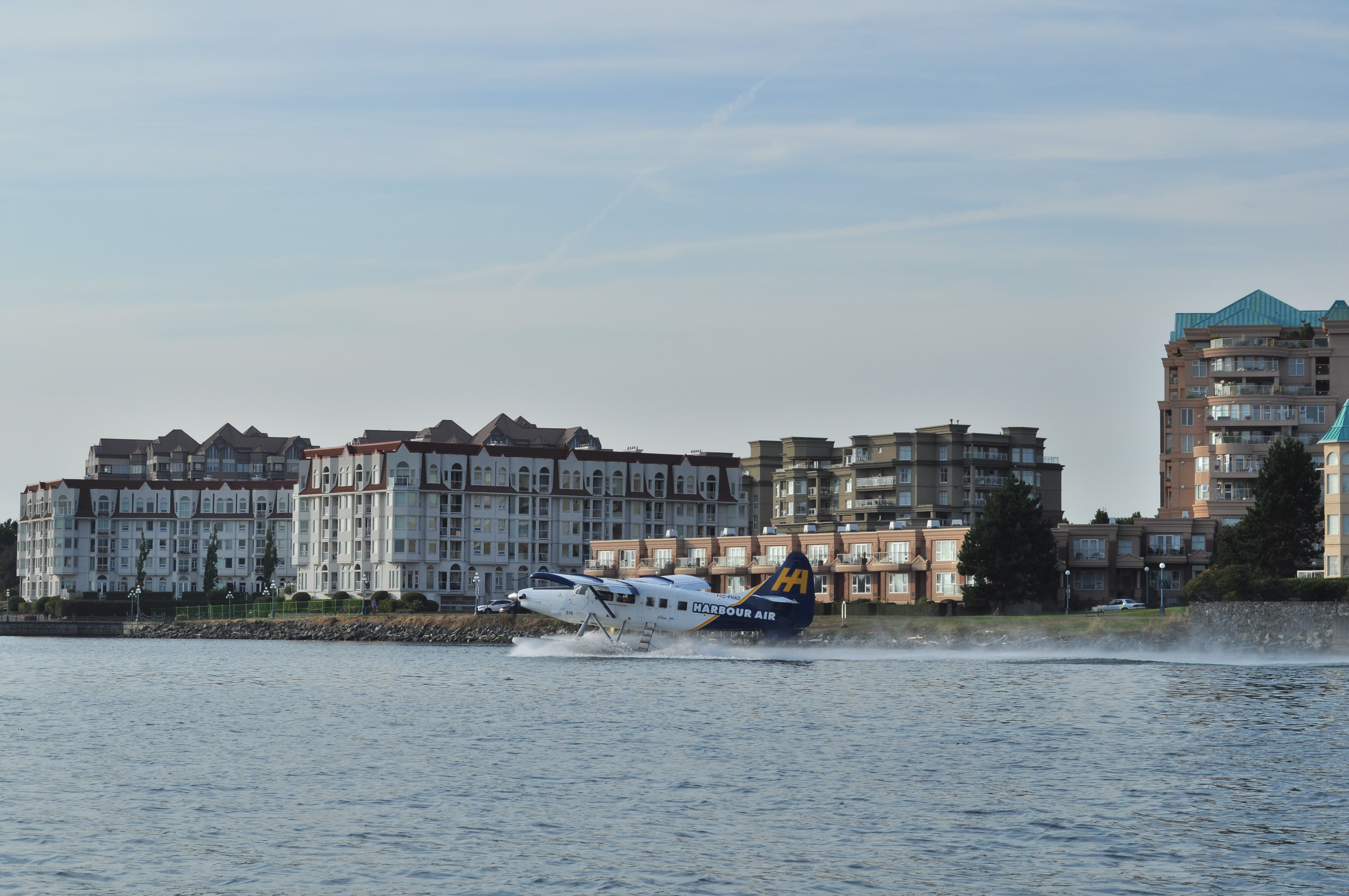
Seaplane taking off, Middle Harbour, Victoria, British Columbia

Harbour Air has won the following awards:

- 2009 to 2014 – Canada's Best Managed Companies
- 2009 to 2011 – BC's Top 55 Employers
- 2011 – BC's Top 100 Employers for Young People
- 2011 – Business of the Year: Victoria Chamber of Commerce
- 2011 – Canada Tourism Commission Signature Experience Award
- 2011/2016 – Business of the Year on Vancouver Island: Business Examiner / Business Vancouver Island
- 2012 – Cumberbatch Award: Guild of Air Pilots and Air Navigators
- 2012/2015 – Canada's 10 Most Admired Corporate Cultures
- 2015 – Greater Victoria Chamber of Commerce Business Awards – Outstanding Customer Service
- 2015 – VISA Canada Traveller Experience of the Year/Tourism Industry Association of Canada

== Destinations ==
As of September 2025, Harbour Air serves the following destinations (some destinations are seasonal):

Country	Province / state	City	Airport	Notes
Canada	British Columbia	Campbell River	Campbell River Water Aerodrome	
Canada	British Columbia	Comox	Comox Water Aerodrome	
Canada	British Columbia	Nanaimo	Nanaimo Harbour Water Aerodrome	Nanaimo Harbour
Canada	British Columbia	Powell River	Powell Lake Water Aerodrome	
Canada	British Columbia	Richmond	Vancouver International Water Airport	Adjacent to the South Terminal at Vancouver International Airport
Canada	British Columbia	Salt Spring Island	Ganges Water Aerodrome	At Ganges
Canada	British Columbia	Sechelt	Sechelt/Porpoise Bay Water Aerodrome	On the Sunshine Coast, at the Lighthouse Pub
Canada	British Columbia	Tofino	Tofino Harbour Water Aerodrome	
Canada	British Columbia	Tofino	Tofino-Long Beach Airport	
Canada	British Columbia	Ucluelet	Ucluelet Water Aerodrome	
Canada	British Columbia	Vancouver	Vancouver Harbour Flight Centre	Located in Burrard Inlet and sometimes known as Vancouver Harbour Water Aerodrome or Vancouver Coal Harbour Seaplane Base
Canada	British Columbia	Vancouver	Vancouver International Airport	At the South Terminal, 5 km (3.1 mi) from the Main Terminal
Canada	British Columbia	Victoria	Victoria Inner Harbour Airport	At Inner Harbour
Canada	British Columbia	Victoria	Victoria International Airport	
Canada	British Columbia	Whistler	Whistler/Green Lake Water Aerodrome	
United States	Washington	Seattle	Seattle Lake Union Seaplane Base	

== Fleet ==
As of 3 August 2026, Harbour Air listed 37 aircraft and Transport Canada listed 38 aircraft:

Harbour Air fleet
Aircraft	No. of aircraft (HA list)	No. of aircraft (TC list)	Variants	Passengers	Notes
Cessna 172	—	1	172M	—	Not listed at Harbour Air website
Cessna 180 Skywagon	—	1	180J	—	Not listed at Harbour Air website
Cessna 208 Caravan	2	1	208B Grand Caravan EX	9	
de Havilland Beaver	9	10	DHC-2 MK. I	6	On December 10, 2019, the eBeaver flew for the first time, powered by a Magni500
de Havilland Single Otter	22	21	—	14	
de Havilland Twin Otter	4	4	Series 300	19	
Total	37	38			

== Accidents and incidents ==
On August 4, 1998, a de Havilland Canada DHC-2 Beaver, registration C-FOCJ, overturned after landing near Ging̱olx, at Kincolith Water Aerodrome. On the fourth approach, the floatplane touched down, apparently in a controlled manner, and skipped on the water surface. The floats then dug into the water followed by the right wing, which was severed from the fuselage on water impact. The aircraft quickly overturned. All five aboard drowned.

On June 8, 2024, a de Havilland Canada DHC-2 Beaver (same airframe rebuilt from the 1998 crash), registration C-FFHA collided with a boat upon takeoff at Vancouver Harbour Flight Centre.

== Gallery ==
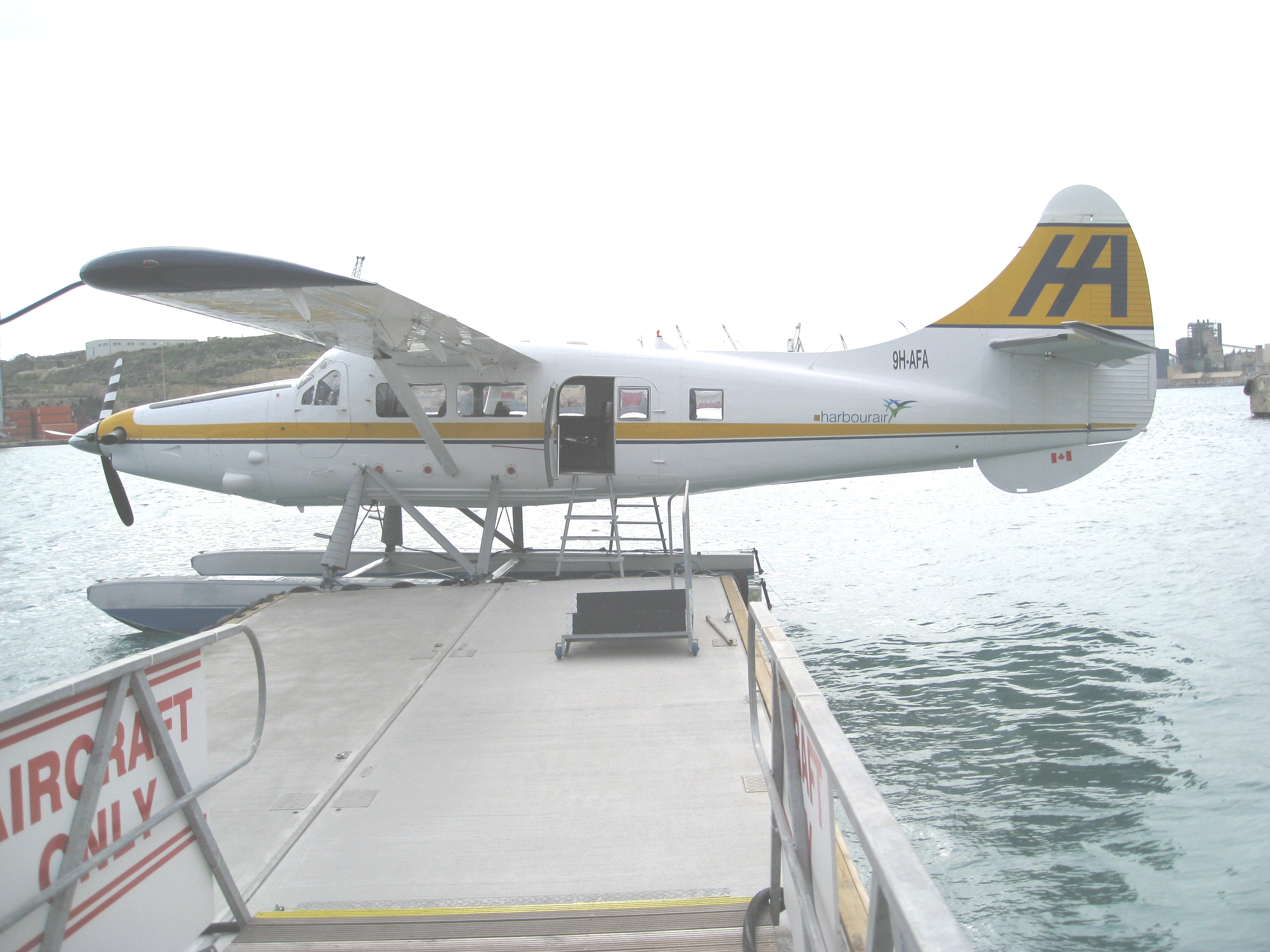
A Single Otter of Harbour Air in the harbour at Valletta

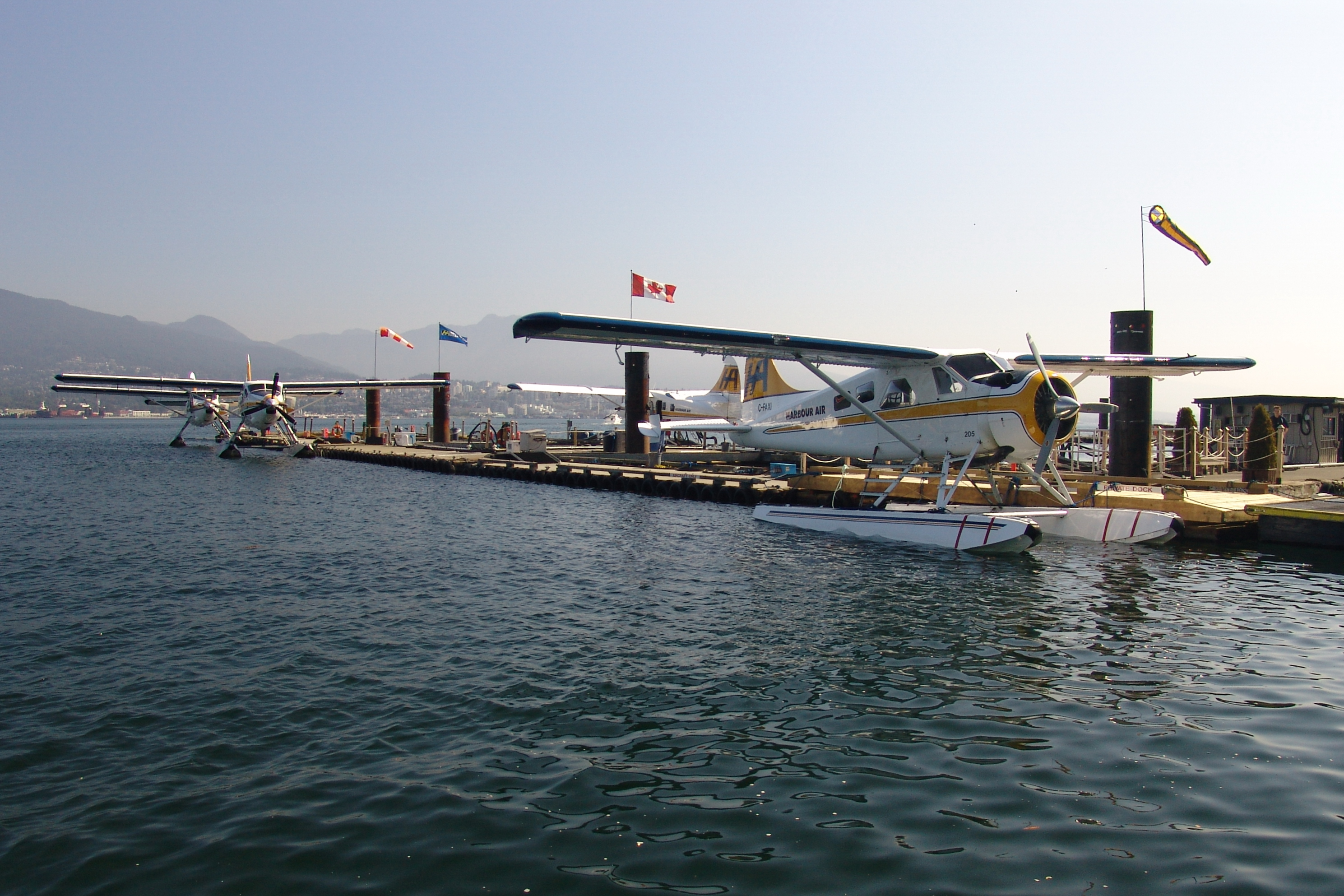
A DHC-2 Beaver at Vancouver Harbour

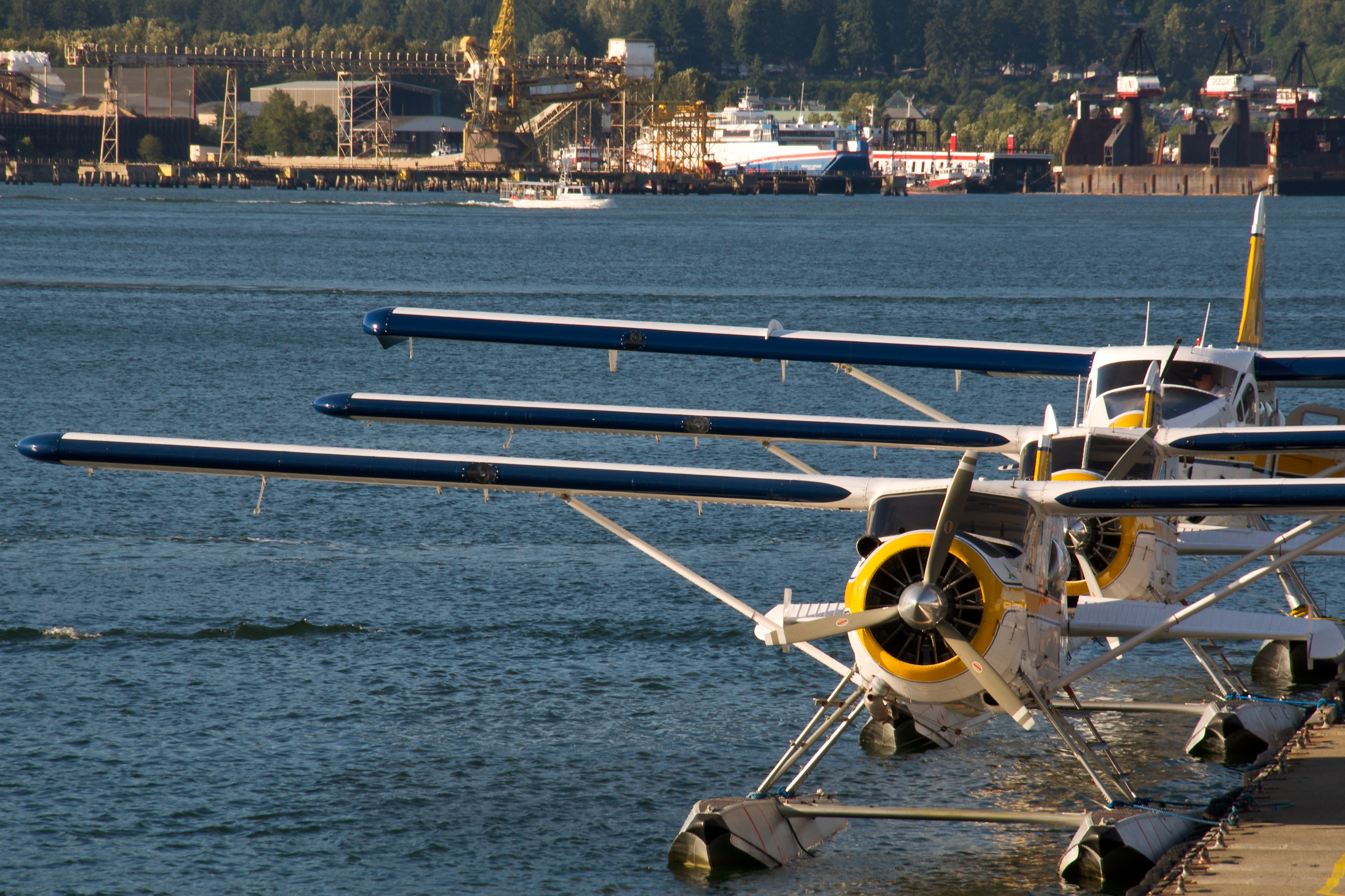
A lineup of 2 DHC-2s and a DHC-3

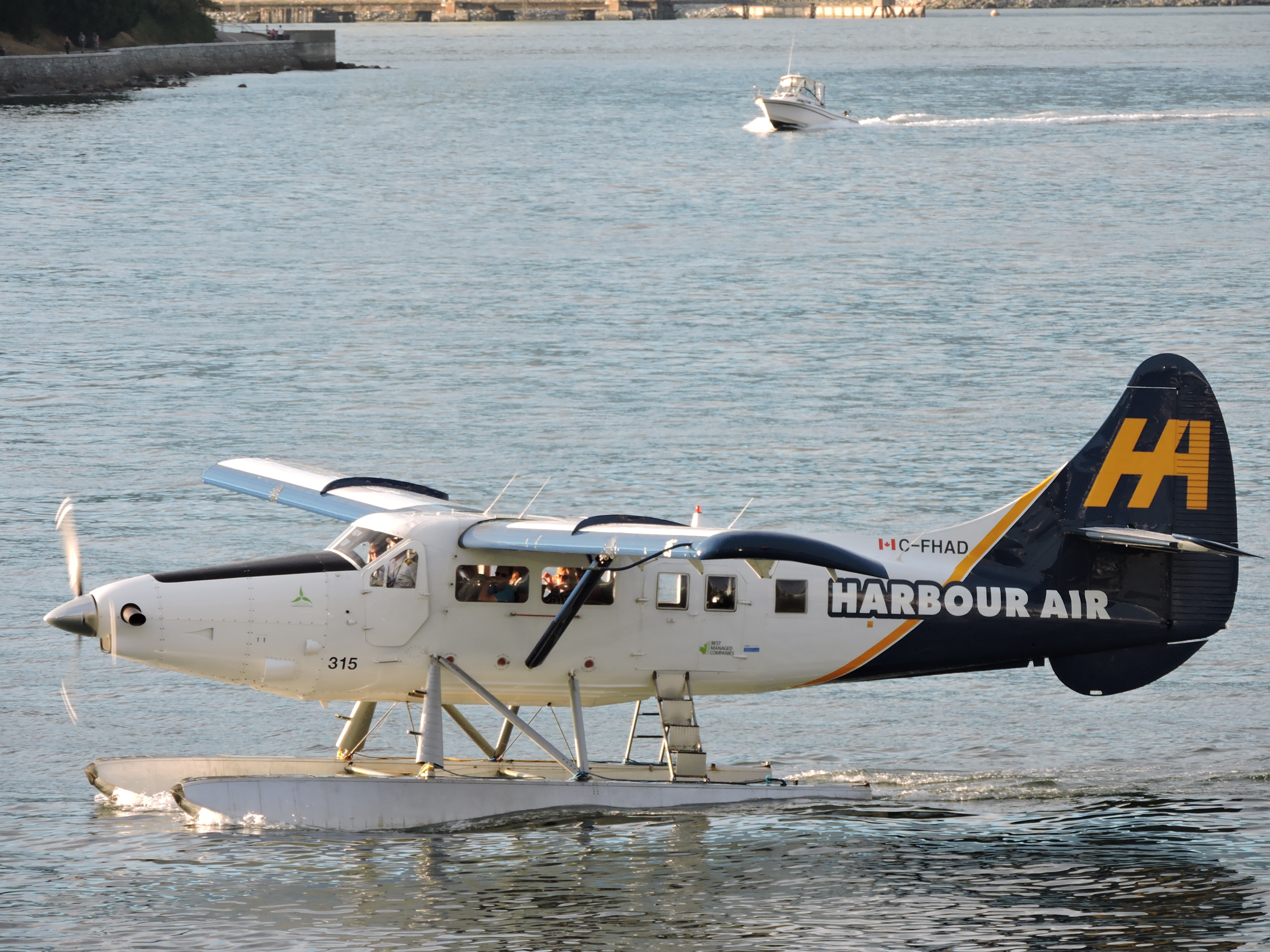
Harbour air at Vancouver Harbour

The vertical stabilizer of a Harbour Air DHC-2

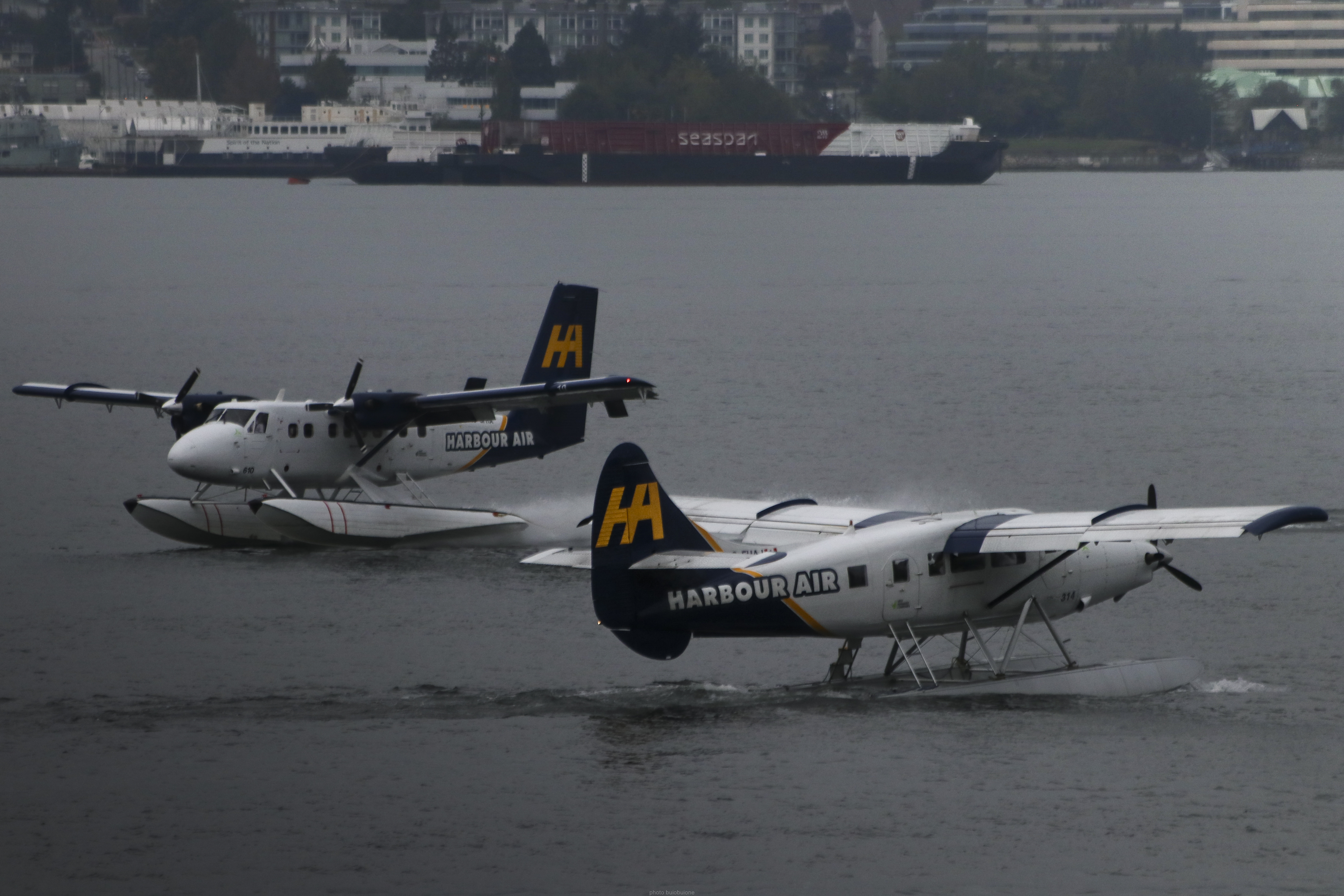
Harbour Air aircraft, Vancouver

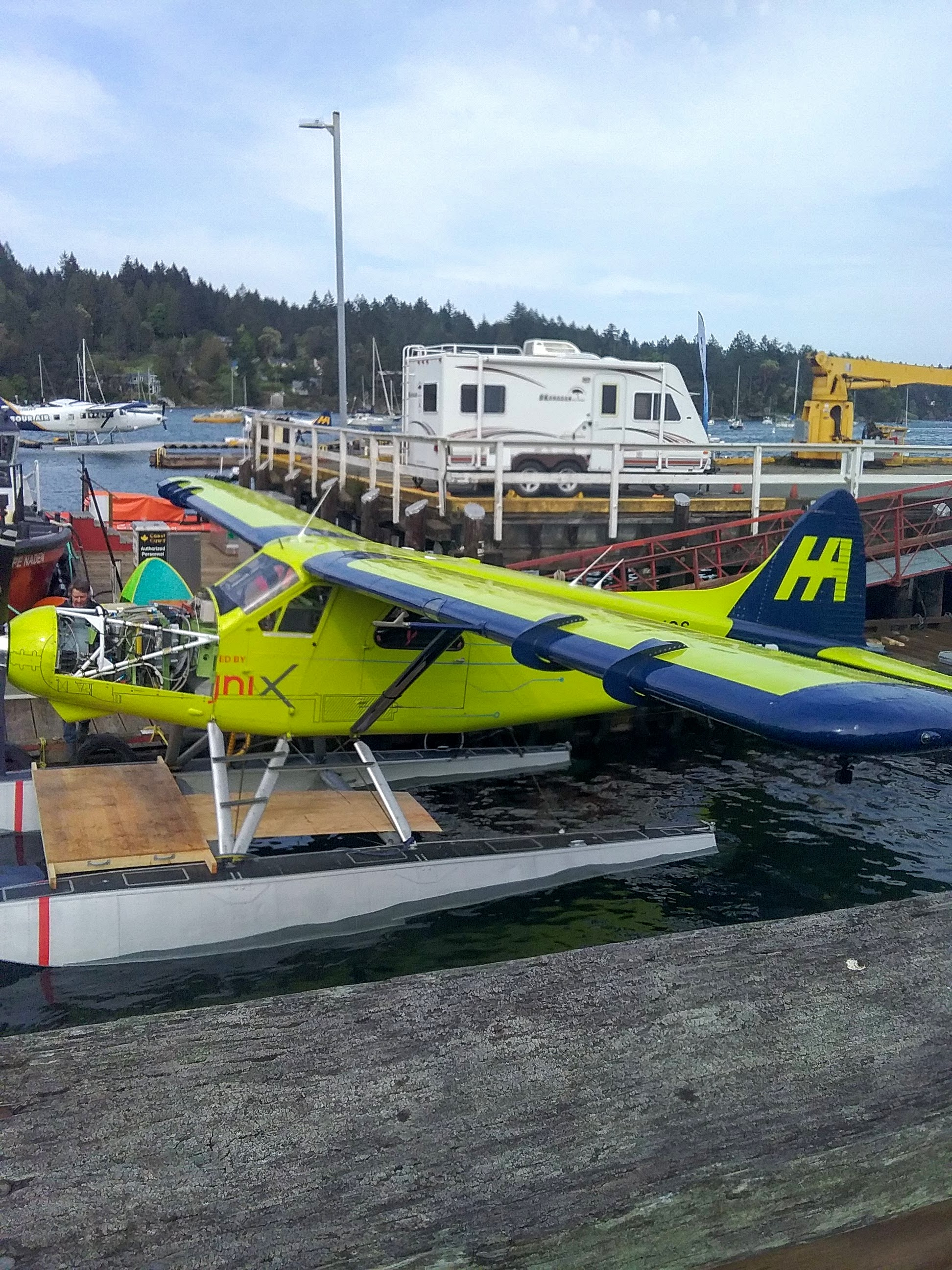
Harbour Air ebeaver in Ganges Harbour

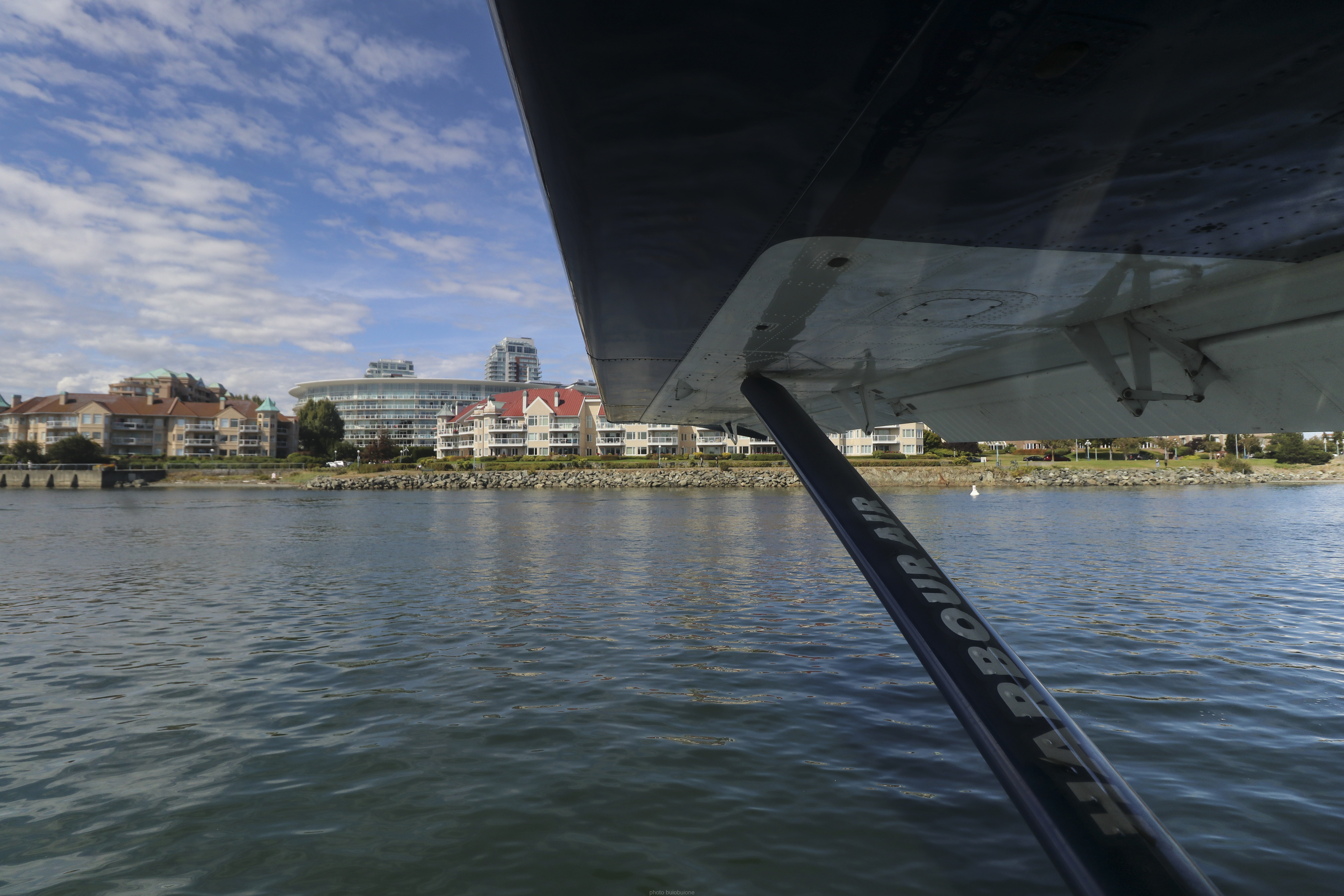
Take off from Victoria Harbour, British Columbia

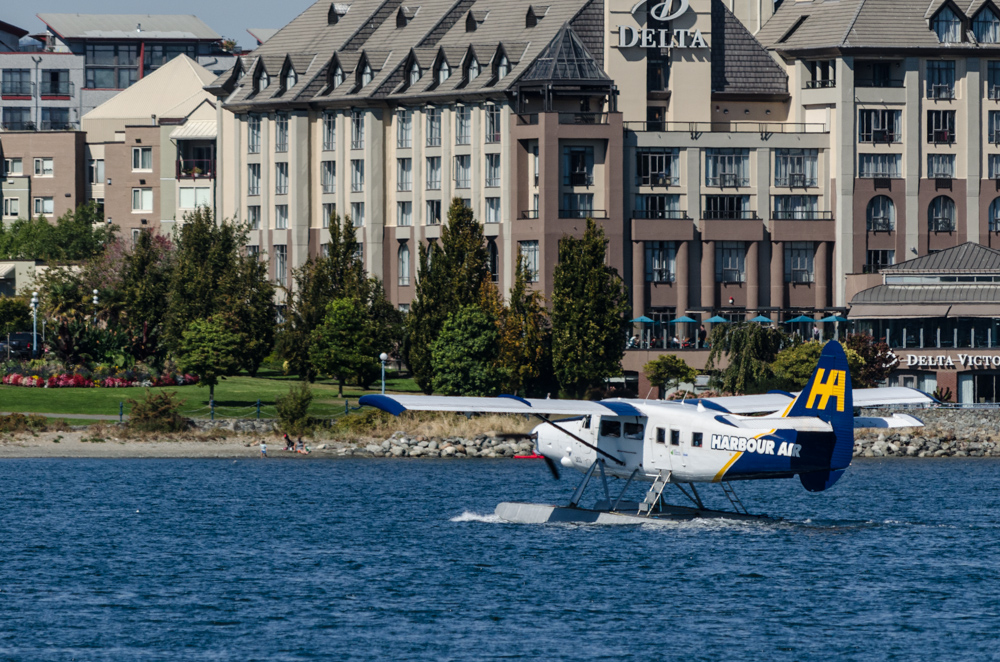
Harbour Air floatplane at Victoria Inner Harbour Airport

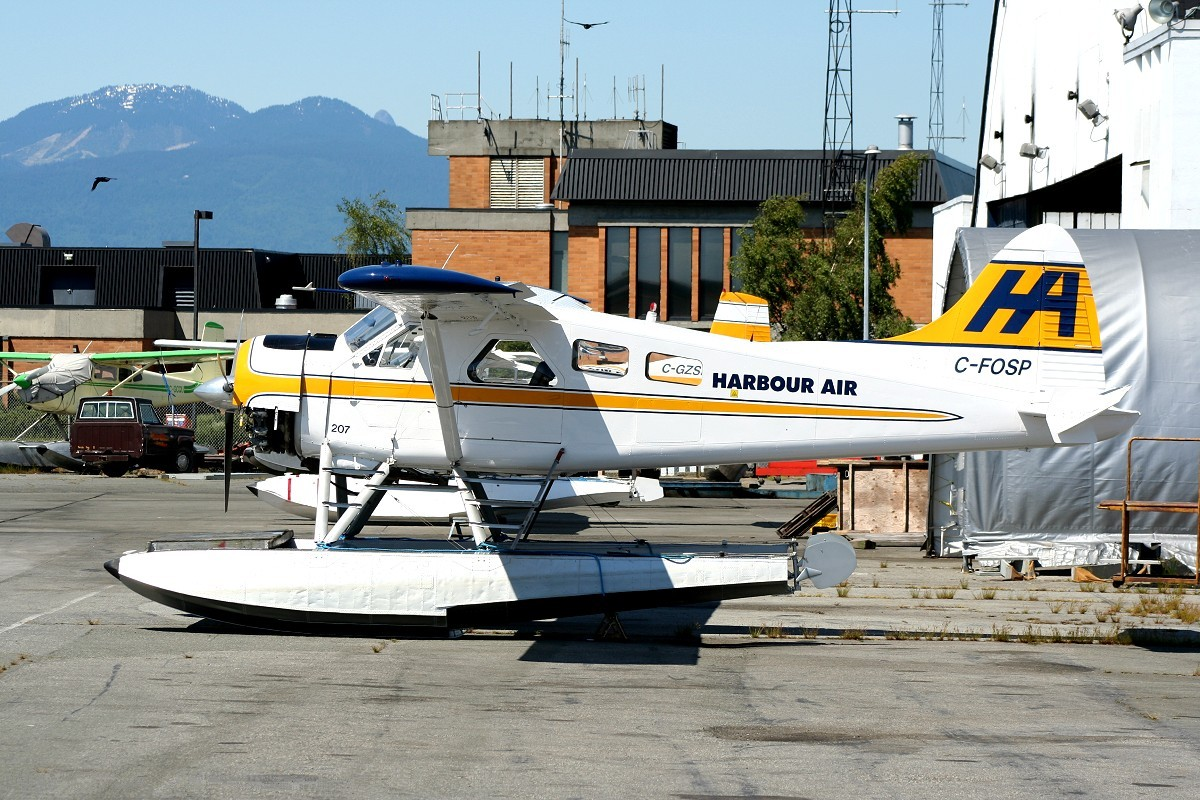
A Harbour Air de Havilland Canada DHC-2 Beaver in Richmond in June 2006

== See also ==
- List of seaplane operators

== Explanatory notes ==
^{1} AOC number is used for Harbour Air Seaplanes, Whistler Air, Salt Spring Air and West Coast Air.
