= Victoria Inner Harbour Airport =

Airport in British Columbia, Canada

Victoria Inner Harbour Airport Victoria Harbour Water Airport
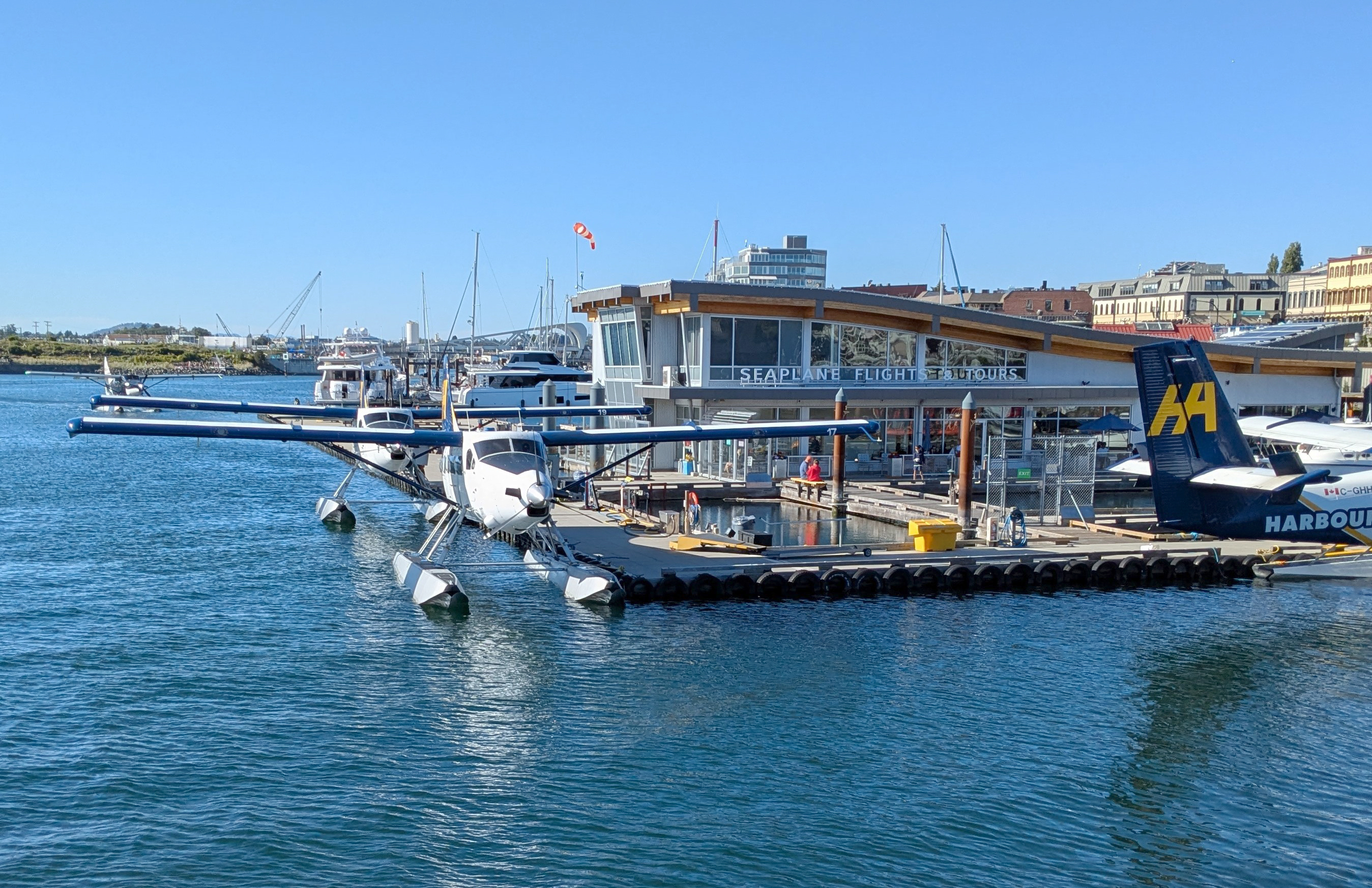
- View of the terminal building from Ship Point
- IATA: YWH; ICAO: CYWH; WMO: 71961

Summary
- Airport type: Private
- Operator: Transport Canada
- Serves: Victoria, British Columbia
- Location: Victoria Harbour
- Time zone: MST (UTC−07:00)
- Elevation AMSL: 0 ft (0 m)
- Coordinates: 48°25′22″N 123°23′15″W

Map
- Location in British Columbia CYWH (Canada)

Runways
| Direction | Length | | Surface |
| Direction | ft | m | Surface |
|---|---|---|---|
| n/a | n/a | n/a | Water |

Statistics (2015)
- Aircraft movements: 28,501
- Number of passengers: 198,973
- Source: Canada Flight Supplement; Environment Canada; Movements and passenger statistics from Statistics Canada

Victoria Inner Harbour Airport or Victoria Harbour Water Airport (IATA: YWH, ICAO: CYWH) is located in Victoria Harbour, adjacent to Victoria, British Columbia, Canada.

The airport is classified as an airport of entry by Transport Canada and is staffed by the Canada Border Services Agency (CBSA). CBSA officers at this airport can handle small airline and general aviation aircraft only, with no more than 15 passengers. The facility can be used only by floatplanes and seaplanes.

In 2007, the link to Vancouver Harbour Water Airport was, according to the Official Airline Guide, Canada's busiest air route by the number of weekly flights.

== Airlines and destinations ==
=== Passenger ===
| Airlines | Destinations |
|---|---|
| Harbour Air | Vancouver, Vancouver Harbour; Seasonal: Ganges, Seattle–Lake Union, Whistler–Green Lake |
| Kenmore Air | Seattle–Lake Union, Seattle–Lake Washington |
| Seair Seaplanes | Vancouver Harbour |

== See also ==
- List of airports in Greater Victoria
