= Whistler/Green Lake Water Aerodrome =

- IATA: YWS; ICAO: none; TC LID: CAE5

Summary
- Airport type: Public
- Owner: Harbour Air Flight Group
- Operator: Whistler Air Services Ltd.
- Serves: Whistler, British Columbia, Pemberton, British Columbia
- Location: Whistler, British Columbia
- Time zone: PST (UTC−08:00)
  - Summer (DST): PDT (UTC−07:00)
- Elevation AMSL: 2,100 ft / 640 m
- Coordinates: 50°08′37″N 122°56′57″W
- Website: harbourair.com

Map
- Location in British Columbia CAE5 (Canada)

Runways
Direction	Length		Surface
Direction	ft	m	Surface
n/a	n/a	n/a	Water
- Sources: Water Aerodrome Supplement

Whistler/Green Lake Water Aerodrome (IATA: YWS, TC LID: CAE5) is located on Green Lake adjacent to Whistler, in British Columbia, Canada.

It offers glacier tours, twice daily scheduled service between Vancouver Harbour Flight Centre, Vancouver International Water Airport and Victoria Inner Harbour Airport, and custom charter services, with float equipped DHC-3 Turbine Otter and DHC-2 Beaver aircraft.

== Airlines and destinations ==
Airlines	Destinations
Harbour Air	Vancouver Airport, Vancouver Harbour, Victoria Harbour
