= Vancouver Harbour Flight Centre =

Vancouver Harbour Flight Centre Vancouver Coal Harbour Seaplane Base Vancouver Harbour Water Aerodrome Hydroaérodrome de Vancouver
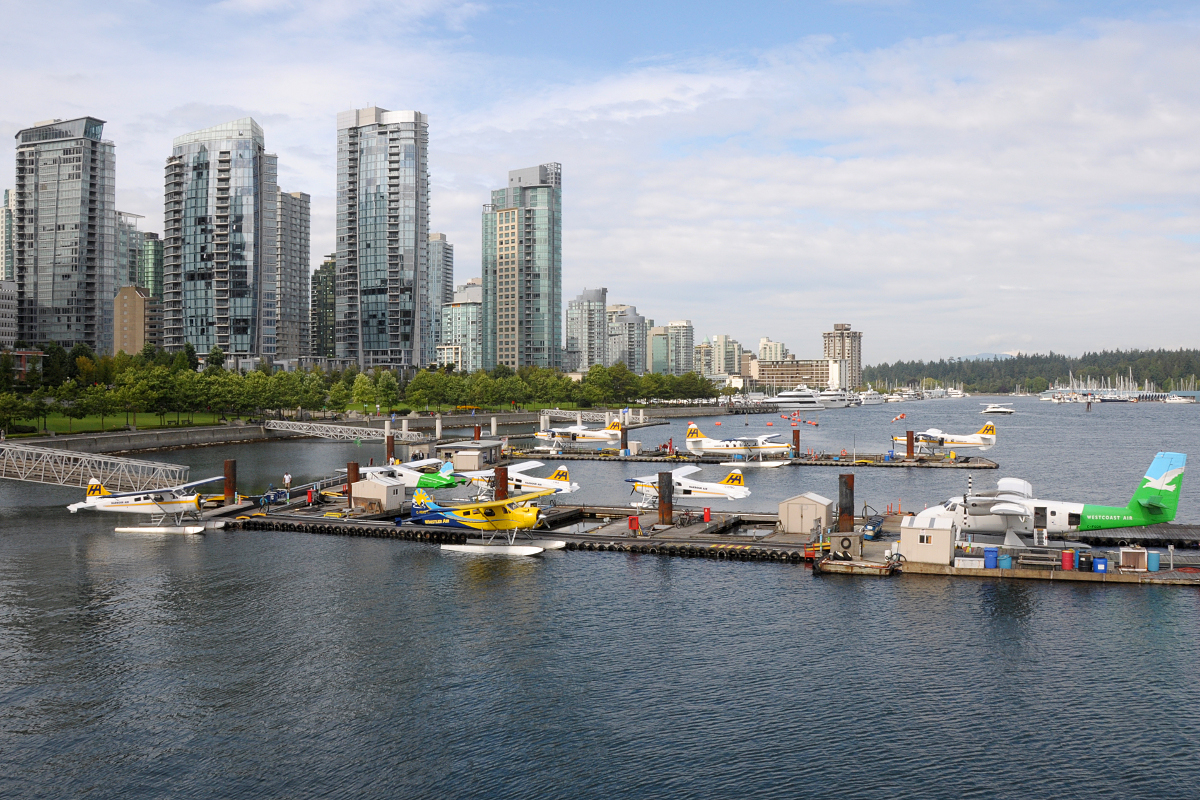
- IATA: CXH; ICAO: CYHC

Summary
- Airport type: Public
- Operator: Harbour Air, Vancouver Harbour Flight Centre
- Serves: Vancouver, British Columbia
- Location: Coal Harbour, Burrard Inlet
- Time zone: MST (UTC−07:00)
- Elevation AMSL: 0 ft (0 m)
- Coordinates: 49°17′40″N 123°06′41″W
- Website: vhfc.ca

Map
- Location in Vancouver CYHC (Canada)

Runways
Direction	Length		Surface
Direction	ft	m	Surface
n/a	n/a	n/a	Water

Statistics (2012)
- Aircraft movements: 54,169
- Sources: Canada Flight Supplement; Movements from Statistics Canada

Vancouver Harbour Flight Centre, Vancouver Harbour Water Aerodrome or Vancouver Coal Harbour Seaplane Base (IATA: CXH, ICAO: CYHC), is a registered aerodrome located at Coal Harbour in Vancouver, British Columbia, Canada. The flight centre is within walking distance of the HeliJet heliport and Waterfront Station, a public transit hub in Downtown Vancouver.

After five years of preparation, consultation and construction, Vancouver Harbour Flight Centre seaplane terminal opened for passenger service on May 25, 2011. The Vancouver Harbour Flight Centre is a partnership between the Clarke Group of Companies and Ledcor Group of Companies.

It is classified as an aerodrome and as an airport of entry by Nav Canada. It is staffed by the Canada Border Services Agency (CBSA). CBSA officers at this airport can handle general aviation aircraft only, with no more than 15 passengers.

== Control tower ==
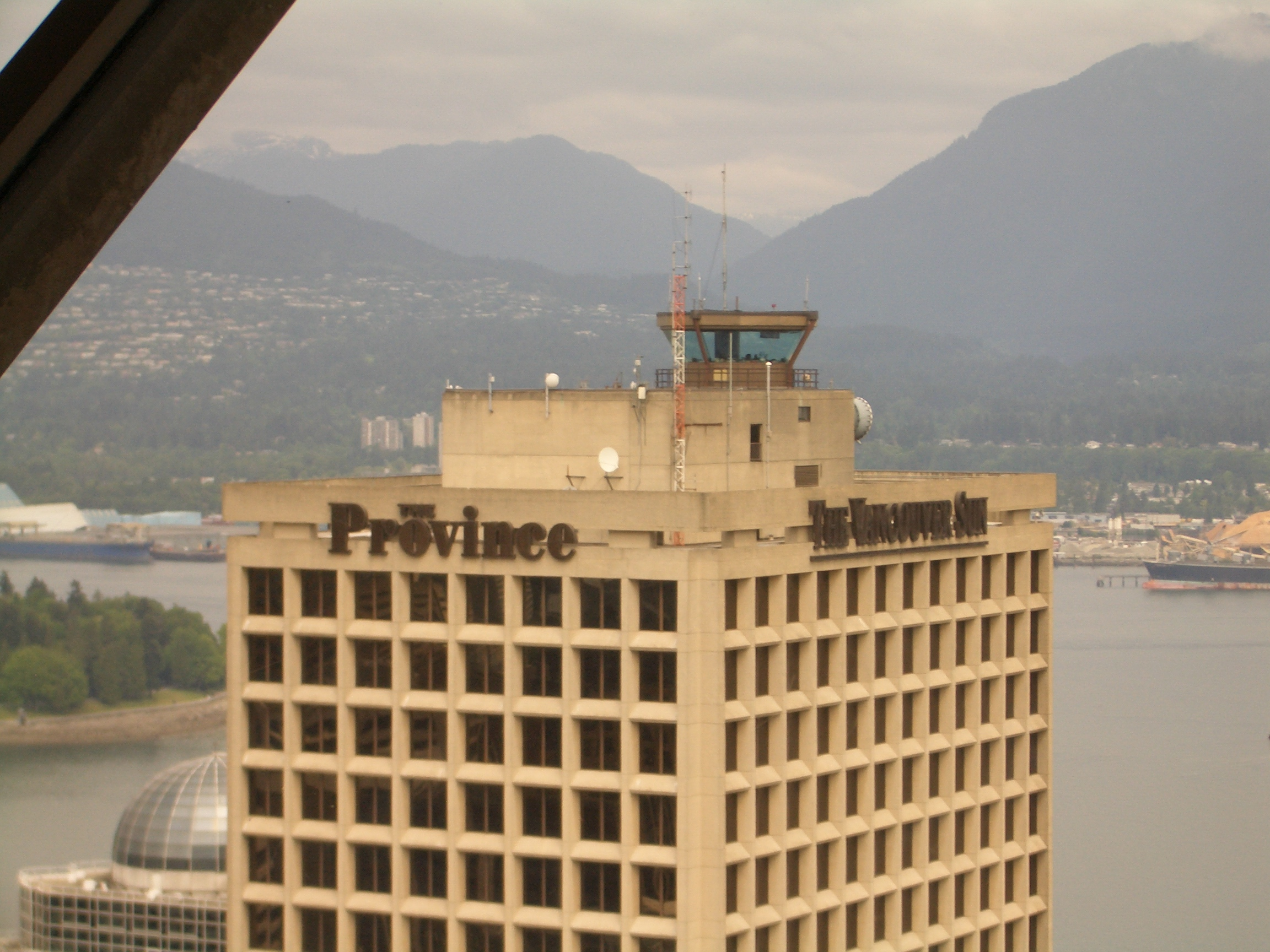
Vancouver Harbour Control Tower

The Vancouver Harbour Control Tower is the only one in Canada specifically for a water aerodrome. At 142 m (466 ft) above ground it is the highest control tower in the world. and is located on top of the Granville Square building. In 2009 the airport handled 54,741 aircraft movements, the 35th busiest in Canada. It is also the 8th busiest aerodrome in BC and the busiest water aerodrome in Canada. Itinerant aircraft movements (from one airport to another) for the aerodrome were 54,711 while local movements were 30.

== Operations ==
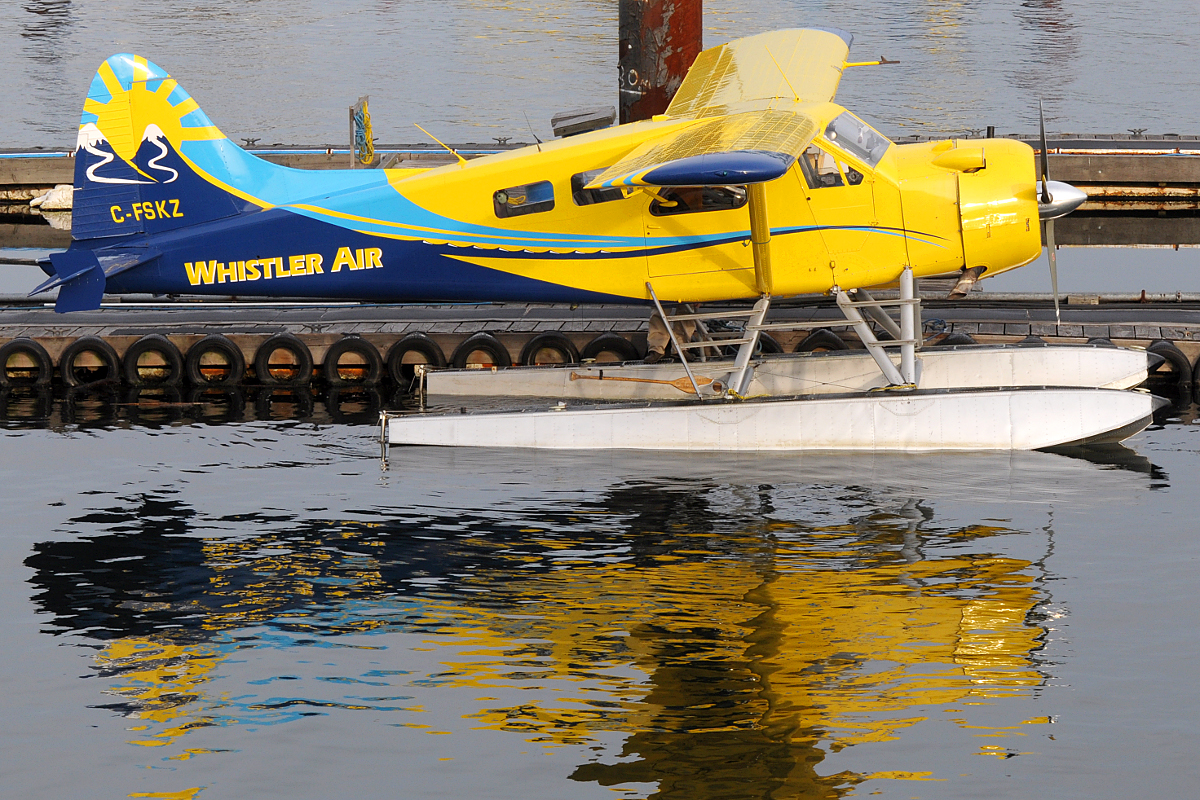
A Whistler Air de Havilland Canada DHC-2 Beaver docked at Vancouver Harbour Flight Centre

The actual aircraft docking area, at 49°17′26.44″N 123°07′08.90″W, is situated just west of Canada Place. This part of Burrard Inlet is listed by Nav Canada as a restricted area and no aircraft are permitted to take off, land or move through the zone at a high speed. Just north of Canada Place is a rectangular section called "Area Alfa", centred on the official coordinates, which is the main aircraft operating zone.

In 2007, the link to Victoria Inner Harbour Airport was, according to the Official Airline Guide, Canada's busiest air route by the number of weekly flights.

== Airlines and destinations ==
Airlines	Destinations
Gulf Island Seaplanes	Gabriola Island/Silva Bay
Harbour Air	Bedwell Harbour, Comox, Ganges, Maple Bay, Nanaimo–Harbour, Powell River, Seattle–Lake Union, Sechelt, Tofino, Victoria–Harbour, Whistler/Green Lake
Helijet	Nanaimo–Harbour, Vancouver, Victoria–Harbour
Kenmore Air	Seattle–Lake Union
Salt Spring Air	Bedwell Harbour, Ganges, Maple Bay, Patricia Bay, Victoria–Harbour
Seair Seaplanes	Nanaimo–Harbour, Victoria–Harbour
Sunshine Coast Air	Nanaimo–Harbour, Sechelt

== See also ==
- List of airports in the Lower Mainland
