= Salt Spring Air =

Saltspring Air
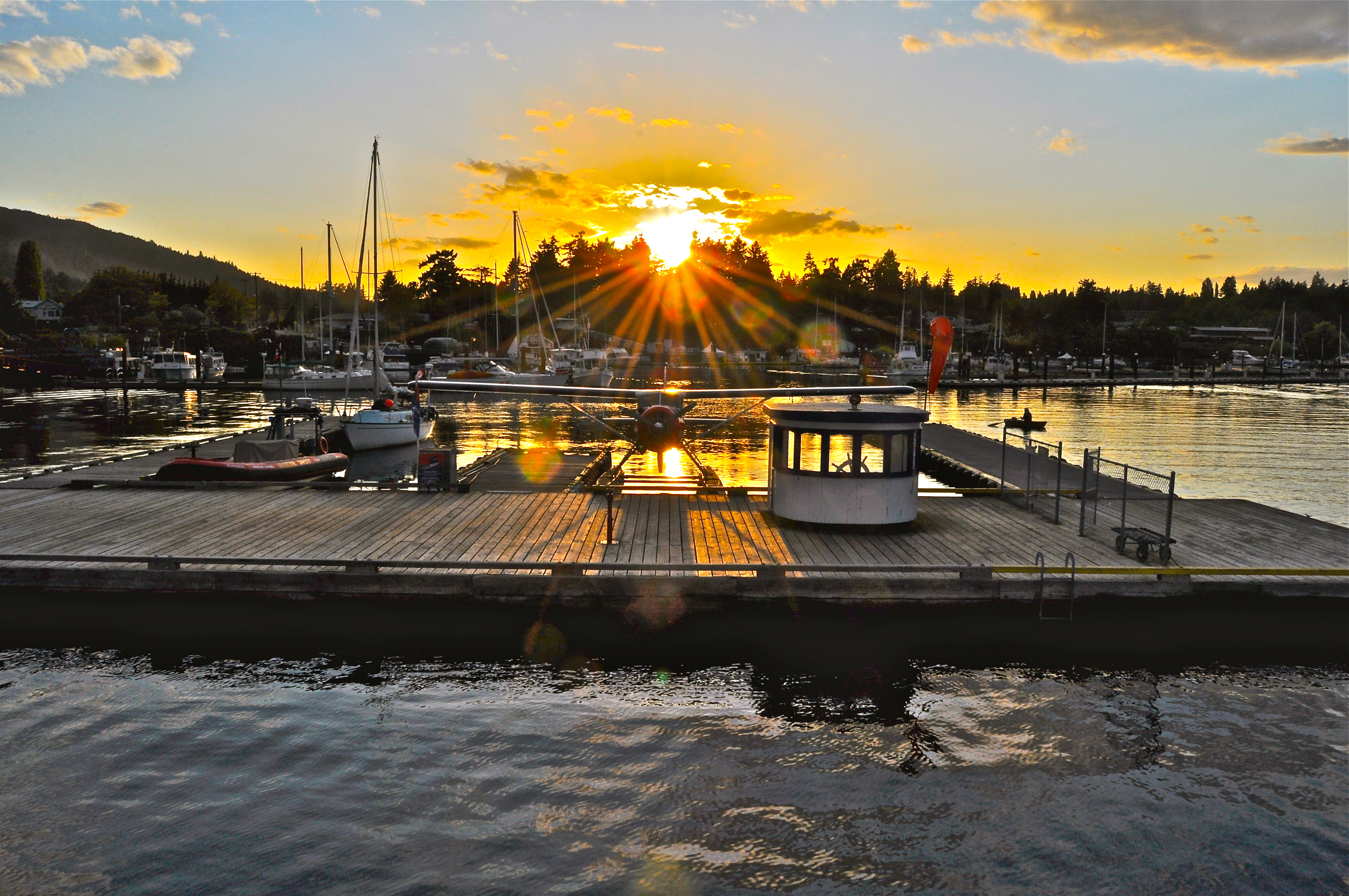
IATA	ICAO	Call sign
-	101	SALT SPRING
- Founded: 2003
- Parent company: Harbour Air Seaplanes
- Headquarters: Saltspring Island, British Columbia
- Key people: St. Clair McColl (founder); Philip Reece (partner); Lisa Cherneff (partner); Harold Kirkpatrick (chief pilot)
- Website: Salt Spring Air

Salt Spring Air (also known as Saltspring Air), now part of Harbour Air Seaplanes, is a floatplane company based on Salt Spring Island, British Columbia, Canada. It operates scheduled flights, charter air service and tours, with its base in Ganges in Harbour Air Seaplanes livery with the Salt Spring Air name on the side of the aircraft and specializes in routes between the Gulf Islands and Vancouver Island. Along with West Coast Air, Harbour Air and Seair Seaplanes, Salt Spring Air is one of the four airlines that operate in the Vancouver Harbour Water Airport and Vancouver Harbour Flight Centre. Scheduled flights by the company also operate between the Gulf Islands and the Vancouver International Airport.

== History ==
In June 2003, St. Clair McColl started Salt Spring Air, with local seaplane services based on the Gulf Islands with a four-seat Cessna 185. The airline's services were targeted to the islands' residents, and personalized services were offered. Since then, with the introduction of de Havilland Beavers in 2004, the company's fleet has grown to four planes operating six scheduled flights from Salt Spring Island to Vancouver, and other scheduled flights fly to various other locations on the Gulf Islands. It remains the only airline based on Salt Spring Island.

During what began as a routine flight on March 19, 2007, McColl rescued a father and son from the frigid waters of the Strait of Georgia after a passenger noticed their capsized boat and notified McColl. The pilot and his two passengers were later honoured by the Lifesaving Society of British Columbia for the rescue.

In November 2015, Salt Spring Air was purchased by the Harbour Air Seaplanes Group which operates in Harbour Air Seaplanes livery with Salt Spring Air name. Salt Spring Air's fleet now joins Harbour Air Seaplanes, Westcoast Air, and Whistler Air as the largest all seaplane airline in the world.

== See also ==
- List of seaplane operators
