= Nanaimo Harbour Water Aerodrome =

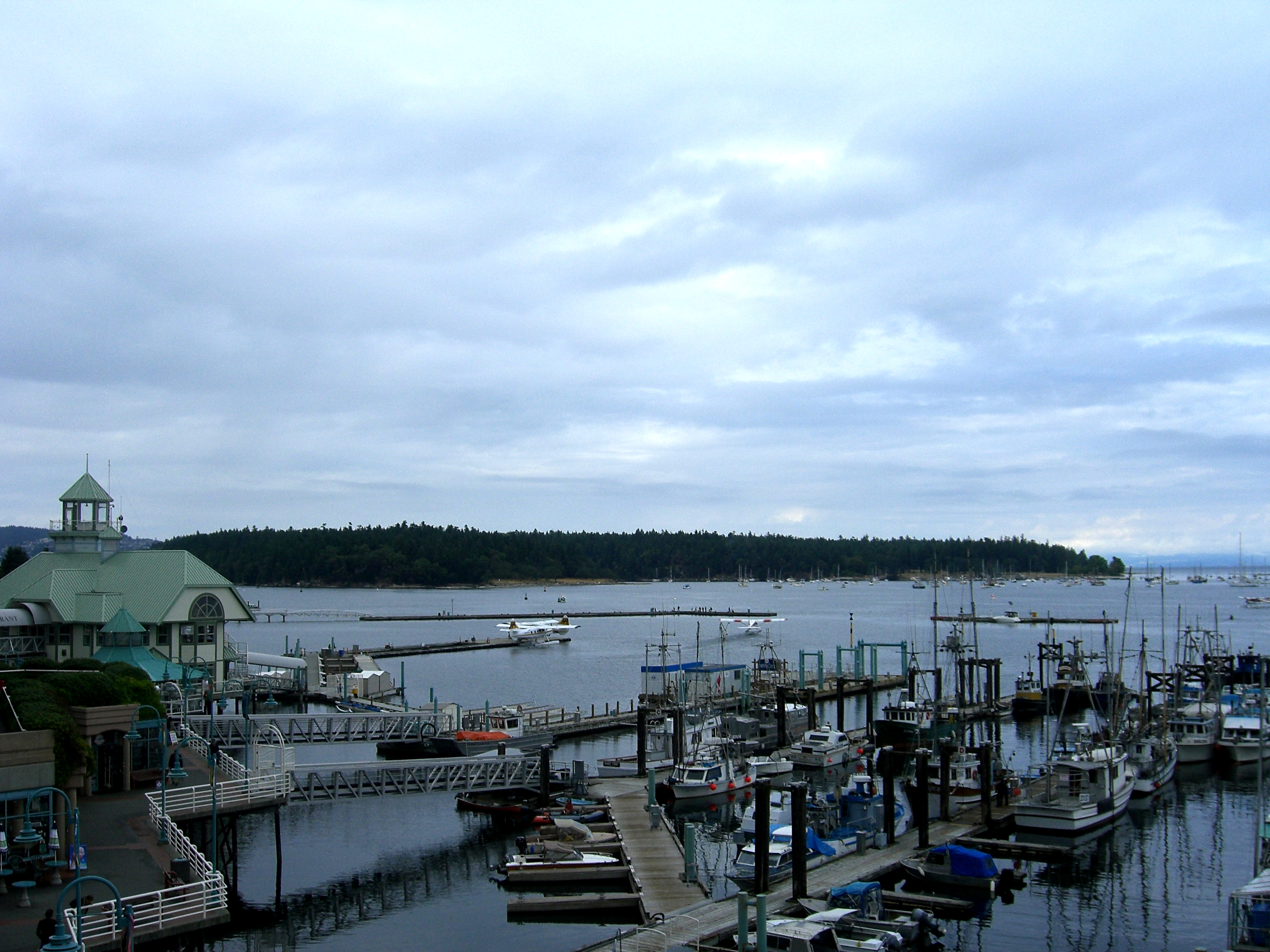
- Nanaimo Harbour Water Aerodrome
- IATA: ZNA; ICAO: none; TC LID: CAC8

Summary
- Airport type: Public
- Operator: Nanaimo Port Authority; Seair Seaplanes
- Serves: Nanaimo, British Columbia, Canada
- Time zone: PST (UTC−08:00)
  - Summer (DST): PDT (UTC−07:00)
- Elevation AMSL: 0 ft / 0 m
- Coordinates: 49°10′11″N 123°56′6″W

Map
- Location in British Columbia CAC8 (Canada)

Runways
Direction	Length		Surface
Direction	ft	m	Surface
n/a	n/a	n/a	Water
- Source: Water Aerodrome Supplement

Nanaimo Harbour Water Aerodrome (IATA: ZNA, TC LID: CAC8) is a seaplane base (SPB) serving the city of Nanaimo, British Columbia, Canada. It is located in the Nanaimo Harbour, right downtown.

It is registered as an aerodrome, formerly classified as an airport, and an airport of entry by Nav Canada and is staffed by the Canada Border Services Agency (CBSA). CBSA officers at this airport can handle general aviation aircraft only, with no more than 15 passengers.

== Airlines and destinations ==
Airlines	Destinations
Harbour Air	Vancouver, Vancouver Harbour, Sechelt
Helijet	Vancouver, Vancouver Harbour
Kenmore Air	Kenmore Air Harbor
Seair Seaplanes	Vancouver, Vancouver Harbour
Sunshine Coast Air	Sechelt, Vancouver
Tofino Air	Charter: Tofino

== See also ==
- Nanaimo Airport
- List of airports on Vancouver Island
