= East Hampton Airport =

Airport in East Hampton, New York, United States

Town of East Hampton Airport
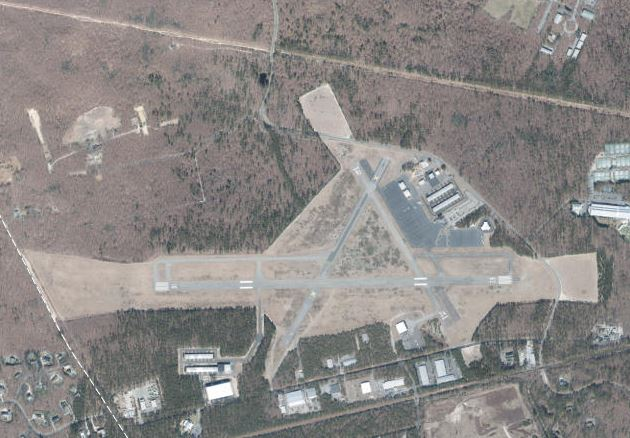
- IATA: HTO; ICAO: KJPX; FAA LID: JPX

Summary
- Airport type: Private (in litigation)
- Owner/Operator: Town of East Hampton
- Serves: East Hampton, New York
- Location: Wainscott, New York
- Opened: 1937; 89 years ago
- Elevation AMSL: 55 ft (17 m)
- Coordinates: 40°57′34″N 072°15′06″W
- Website: ehamptonny.gov/airport

Map
- Interactive map of Town of East Hampton Airport

Runways
Direction	Length		Surface
Direction	ft	m	Surface
10/28	4,255	1,297	Asphalt
16/34	2,060	628	Asphalt

Statistics (2007)
- Aircraft operations: 31,612
- Based aircraft: 89
- Source: Federal Aviation Administration

Town of East Hampton Airport (IATA: HTO, ICAO: KJPX, formerly KHTO, FAA LID: JPX, formerly HTO) — formerly known as East Hampton Airport prior to May 19, 2022 — is an airport located in the Wainscott section of the Town of East Hampton, New York, just west of East Hampton Village. The airport is owned and operated by the Town of East Hampton.

Helicopter flights take 32 minutes between Manhattan and the airport while driving time from Manhattan via the Long Island Expressway and the two-lane Montauk Highway can take 3 hours or more.

== Overview ==
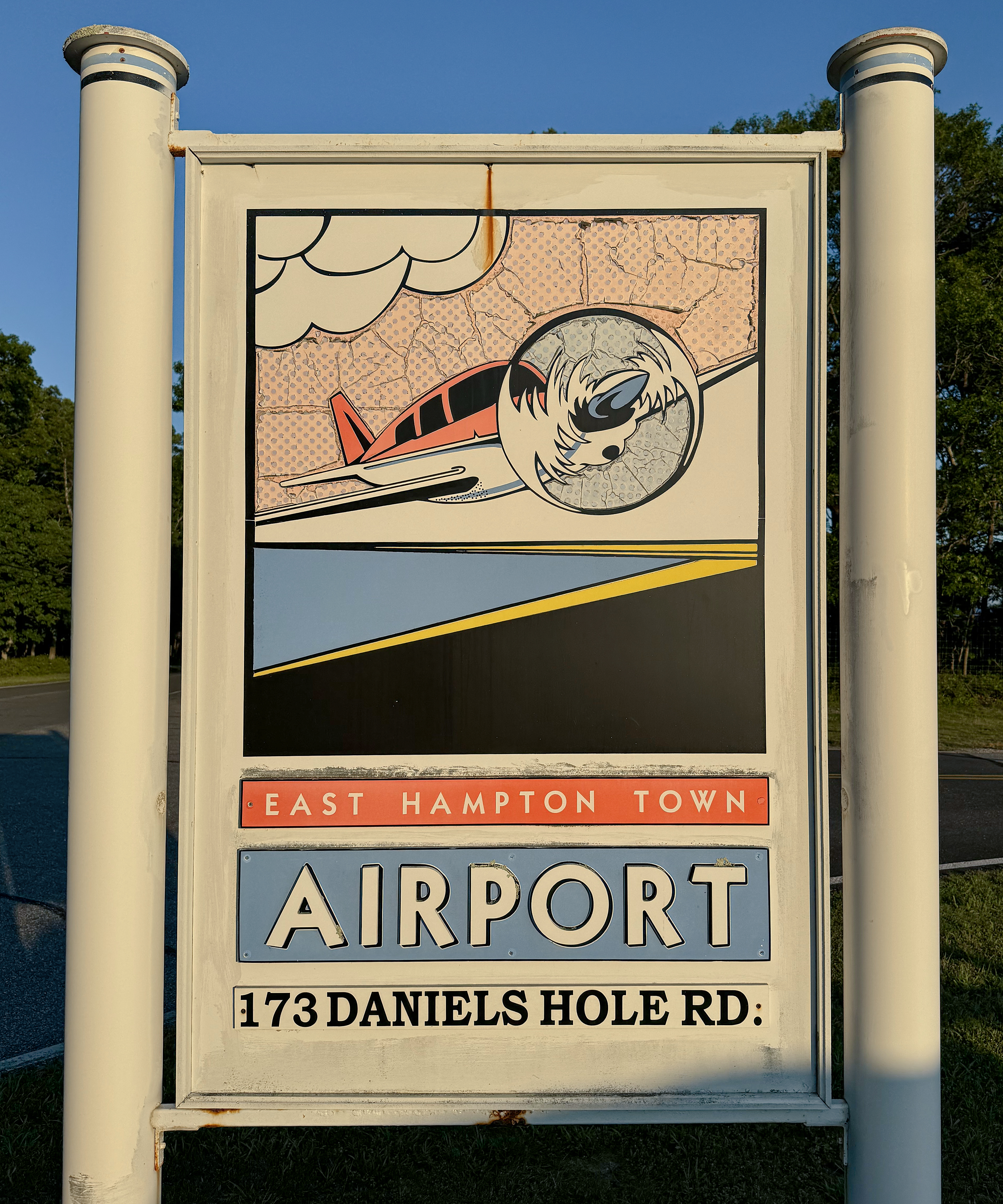
Welcome sign

The airport, which opened in 1937, predates all of the major airports on Long Island including those in New York City and has long been used by celebrities, Wall Streeters, and the wealthy visiting the Hamptons. The airport's commercial commuter traffic is mostly between East Hampton and New York City, which is roughly 100 miles (160 km) away.

Effective May 19, 2022, the airport went from a public to a private airport according to FAA records. However, enforcement of the change to the private rules was delayed by a temporary injunction at the request of aviation users of the airport. On October 19, 2022, Paul J. Baisley, Jr., Presiding Justice of the Supreme Court Civil Parts of the 10th Judicial District in Suffolk County, New York, made the order permanent because the town did not analyze the proposed restrictions under New York's State Environmental Quality Review Act or submit a study in compliance with the federal Airport Noise and Capacity Act of 1990. The town is debating whether to appeal the ruling. In the meantime the new codes and the FAA documents indicating it is a private airport remain in place.

The airport codes changed on May 19, 2022, from KHTO to KJPX. The airport name also changed from East Hampton Airport to Town of East Hampton Airport. This was part of a plan to convert the airport from a public airport to a town-owned private airport and the FAA description of the airport now says it is private. The move to restrict general aviation use was blocked by a last-minute restraining order to sort out numerous legal suits. However the code and name change were approved by the FAA and put on official maps.

The move to privatize the airport would permit the airport to get prior permission for aircraft to fully use the airport's facilities. The closure is aimed at controlling a dramatic increase since 2014 in commuter helicopter traffic after Blade made it much easier for individuals to book seats on chartered helicopters at a set price and schedule. The town allowed FAA grants to expire in September 2021 and that cleared the way for the Town rather than the FAA to govern the airport. The Town earlier had lost court cases to impose its rules including a curfew since the FAA rules prohibited the move. The move avoids the calls to close the airport altogether.

== History ==
Construction began in 1936 on an original 209-acre plot (which quickly expanded to 260 acres). At the time it was the second largest airport in terms of size on Long Island. Only the former Roosevelt Field airport was bigger. It predates LaGuardia Airport (1939); John F. Kennedy International Airport (1941), Francis S. Gabreski Airport (1943); Long Island MacArthur Airport (1944), and Naval Weapons Industrial Reserve Plant, Calverton (1956). Suffolk County, New York, sold the land to East Hampton for $1 at the urging of East Hampton Supervisor Perry B. Duryea Sr. The Works Progress Administration granted $45,000 of the original $100,000 of building the airport. The WPA request was made by the town after being petitioned by the East Hampton Business Men's Club.

In 1937 the East Hampton Star speculated Juan Trippe, who had a house on the ocean near the airport and had shown interest in the airport, might have been considering it for a base for Pan American Airways trans-Atlantic service.

The original airport had no water, electricity, telephones or buildings.

The first terminal was a World War I barracks towed by mule from Camp Upton.

Shortly after the opening, the Hampton Air Service began to offer scheduled flights between the airport and Holmes Airport (near the Bulova headquarters near Laguardia Airport today).

In 1943, plans were made to expand the airport to 700 acres. During this time, celebrities spotted at the airport included Henry Ford II, W. Averell Harriman, Gary Cooper, and Clark Gable.

In 1945, Charlotte Niles and Margaret Lowell Wallace (Women's Airforce Service Pilots WASPS) became the operators of the airport after a hangar belonging to Tripp. Niles said her father was William White Niles who was an attorney for the Wright Brothers. They arranged for numerous improvements including a concrete hangar.

In the 1980s, East Hampton Air, and Montauk-Caribbean Airways competed for scheduled service to New York. They were joined by Trump Air on May 28, 1989. In 1990, all three services were discontinued.

In 1989, East Hampton in the Beaux Arch '89 project invited architects to submit a design for a new terminal to replace the shack terminal. More than 100 entries arrived. After the town decided not to build the winner, litigation ensued and in 1994 the current terminal was built.

On August 28, 1999, Bill Clinton and Hillary Clinton held a fundraiser at the airport hangar. The Clintons had begun spending their vacations in East Hampton in 1998 after Hillary Clinton began considering a run for the U.S. Senate. During the times Marine One was parked at the airport.

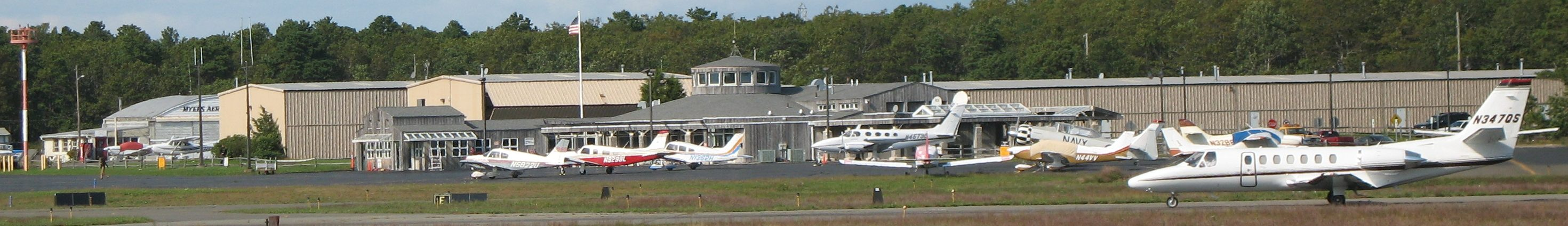
The airport, as seen in 2006.

The advent of the BLADE Urban Air Mobility app by Hamptons resident Robert S. Wiesenthal in 2014 had a major effect on helicopter service. The app made it possible to book individual seats at scheduled times at a set price rather than going through the trouble of finding a chartered helicopter and then finding others to split the cost of the charter. Although Blade's logo is emblazoned on many of the helicopters, Blade does not own or operate the helicopters. They are owned by third-party vendors.

Management of the airport is experiencing considerable upheaval since 2014 when the app Blade made it much easier for travelers to book seats at set price and schedule on chartered helicopters. This led to a 43% increase in helicopter traffic going from 6,706 flights/year in 2015 to 9,577 in 2019. This in turn brought about a substantial number of noise complaints both in the immediate vicinity as well as along the length of routes from New York City to the airport. Blade in January 2022 was charging between $700 and $795 for the 100 mile trip. There were calls to close the airport. Parallels have been made with Santa Monica Airport which experienced similar problems and is now slated to close in 2028. East Hampton hired Cooley LLP which advised Santa Monica in that case.

In January 2022, the Town announced its plans to temporarily close the airport in February and open it a few days later as a private town-owned airport that would require local permission for aircraft to use the airport. The Town in the past had tried unsuccessfully to control the helicopters but was thwarted in court cases regarding curfews. Courts decided that the FAA which provided funds for the airport rather than the Town controlled the rules of the airport. The town allowed the FAA grants to expire on September 21, 2021.

East Hampton Supervisor Peter Van Scoyoc and the entire slate of Democratic candidates was re-elected in November 2022 and his approach to privately operating the airport was seen as a compromise to keep the airport open. The FAA had advised Van Scoyoc that in order to keep the airport open under its previous operation it would have required the Town to get permission from all airport operators in order to implement new rules. By temporarily closing the airport the Town could impose its new rules.

The plan to keep the airport open but restrict the helicopters but permit local aircraft was called by the New York Post "aerial class warfare Hamptons-style — pitting millionaires against billionaires."

Among the billionaires who use the airport are Steve Cohen, Eric Schmidt, Robert Kraft, and Ronald Perelman.

Among the options are that helicopters could get permission to use the airport but with stricter rules available about times and flight rules.

As helicopter and seaplane traffic increased large swathes of the rural North and South Forks of Long Island complained of helicopter noise levels comparable to those encountered close to major commercial airports.

== Facilities and aircraft ==
The airport handled 31,464 flights in 2019 (86/day) with 11,228 being pistons; 9,577 helicopters; 6,140 turboprops; 4,505 jets; 14 unclassified. Monthly flights increased from less than 1,000 in January (33/day) to almost 8,000 in August (266/day) .

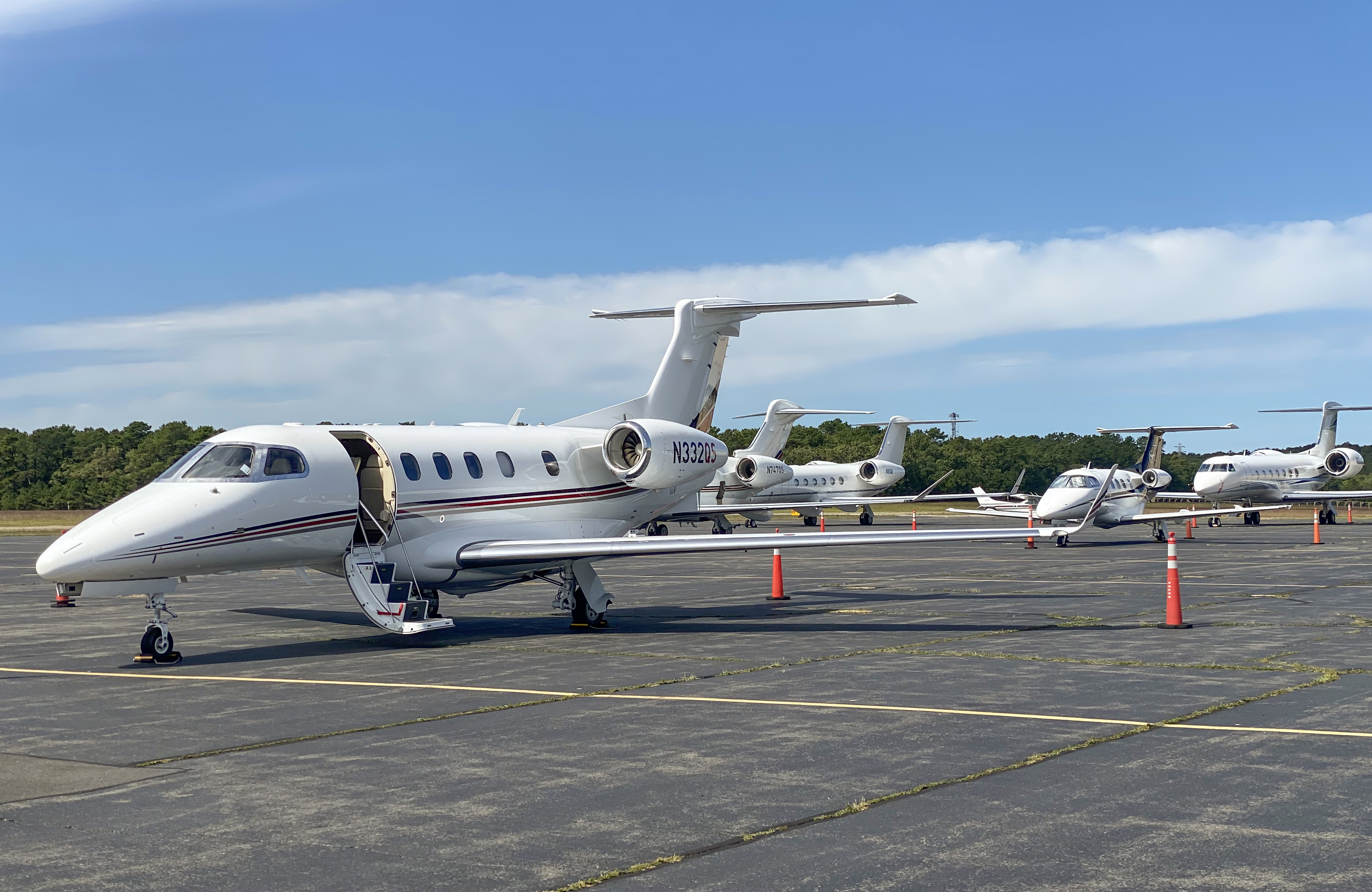
During summer months the ramp is full of private jets

East Hampton Airport covers an area of 570 acres (231 ha) at an elevation of 55 feet (17 m) above mean sea level. It has two active runways with asphalt surfaces: 10/28 is 4,255 by 100 feet (1,297 x 30 m) and 16/34 is 2,060 by 75 feet (628 x 23 m).

== Airlines and destinations ==
Airlines	Destinations
Blade	Seasonal charter: New York–Skyport

HeliFlite founded in 1998, offers on-demand charter service, helicopter management, fractional ownership and a 25-hour HeliCard™ product; it operates a fleet of twin engine & dual piloted Bell 430 and Sikorsky S76 executive class helicopters.

Trump Air provided regularly scheduled helicopter service in the late 1980s and early 1990s; the last scheduled fixed-wing airline was East Hampton Airlines, which now offers chartered service.

== Other uses ==
Marine One was based at the airport for one week in August 1998 and 1999 during week-long visits by Bill Clinton and Hillary Clinton to the Georgica Pond home of director Steven Spielberg. Clinton conducted a fundraiser in a hangar at the airport in 1999.

The PBS children's television show It's a Big Big World was taped at Wainscott Studios which is the industrial park associated with the airport.

== See also ==
- List of airports in New York
