= Prince Rupert/Seal Cove Water Aerodrome =

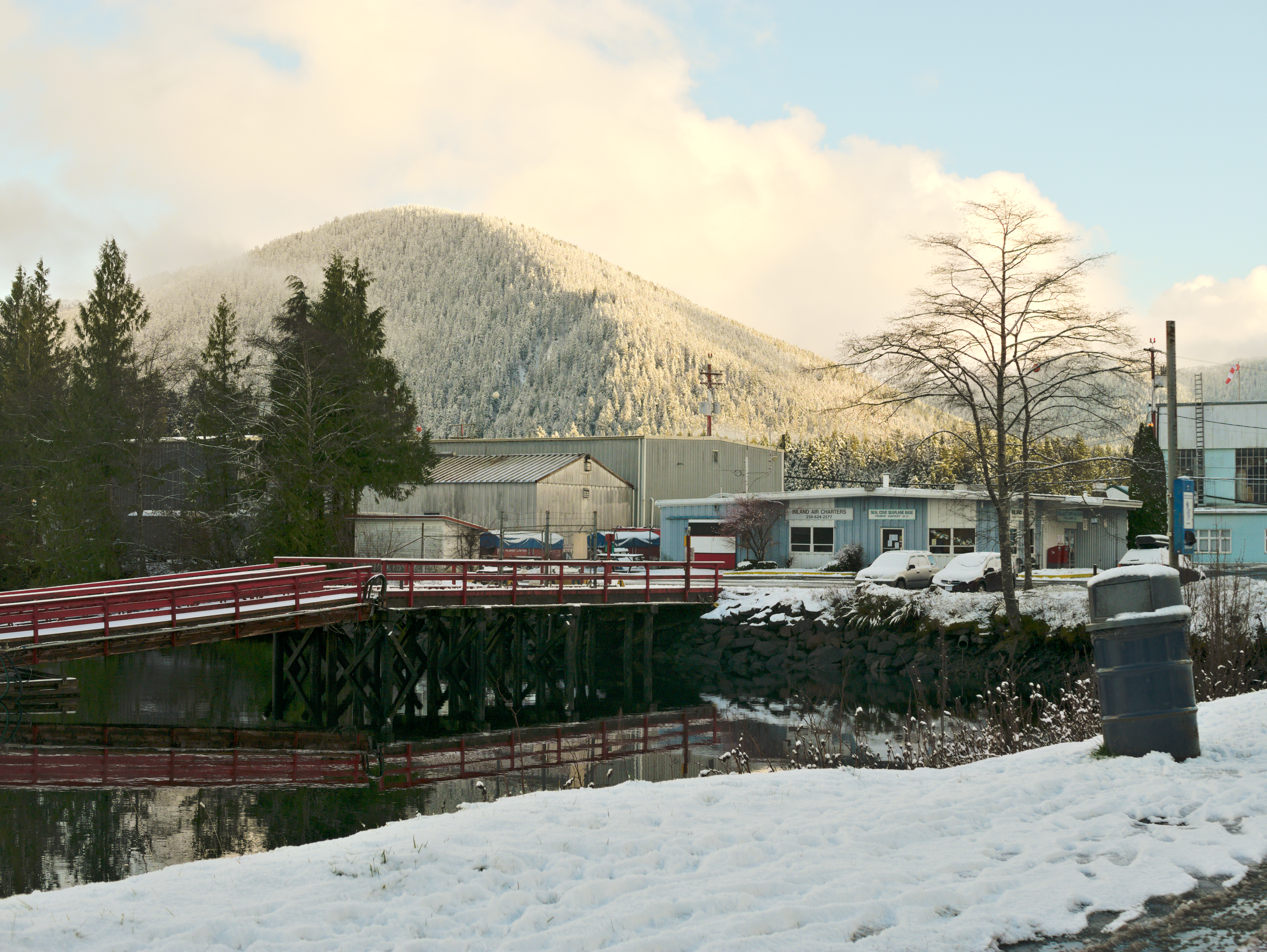
- IATA: ZSW; ICAO: CZSW

Summary
- Airport type: Public
- Operator: Seal Cove Airport Society
- Location: Prince Rupert, British Columbia
- Time zone: PST (UTC−08:00)
  - Summer (DST): PDT (UTC−07:00)
- Elevation AMSL: 0 ft / 0 m
- Coordinates: 54°20′N 130°17′W

Map
- Location in British Columbia CZSW (Canada)

Runways
Direction	Length		Surface
Direction	ft	m	Surface
n/a	n/a	n/a	Water

Statistics (2010)
- Aircraft movements: 13,392
- Source: Water Aerodrome Supplement; Movements from Statistics Canada.

Prince Rupert/Seal Cove Water Aerodrome (IATA: ZSW, ICAO: CZSW) is located adjacent to Prince Rupert, British Columbia, Canada. Inland Air, Ocean Pacific Air, Helijet and Lakelse Air (Universal Helicopters) are users of this aerodrome.

It is classified as an aerodrome and as an airport of entry by Nav Canada, and is staffed by the Canada Border Services Agency (CBSA). CBSA officers at this airport can handle general aviation aircraft only, with no more than 15 passengers.

== Airlines and destinations ==
Airlines	Destinations
Inland Air	Masset

== See also ==
- List of airports in the Prince Rupert area
