= Prince Rupert/Digby Island Water Aerodrome =

Airport in British Columbia, Canada

- IATA: none; ICAO: none; TC LID: CAN6

Summary
- Airport type: Public
- Operator: Prince Rupert Airport Authority
- Location: Prince Rupert, British Columbia
- Time zone: PST (UTC−08:00)
  - Summer (DST): PDT (UTC−07:00)
- Elevation AMSL: 0 ft / 0 m
- Coordinates: 54°19′N 130°24′W

Map
- Location in British Columbia CAN6 (Canada)

Runways
Direction	Length		Surface
Direction	ft	m	Surface
n/a	n/a	n/a	Water

Statistics (2010)
- Aircraft movements: 1,065
- Source: Water Aerodrome Supplement; Movements from Statistics Canada.

Prince Rupert/Digby Island Water Aerodrome (TC LID: CAN6) is located 3 nautical miles (5.6 km; 3.5 mi) west of Prince Rupert, British Columbia, Canada. It is located on Digby Island.

== Airlines and destinations ==
Airlines	Destinations
Inland Air	Masset

== See also ==
- List of airports in the Prince Rupert area
