= LNMC =

LNMC may refer to:

- Monaco Heliport by ICAO code
- Lithium nickel manganese cobalt oxides, commonly used in batteries
