= Blade Air Mobility =

U.S. aviation company

Blade Air Mobility, Inc.
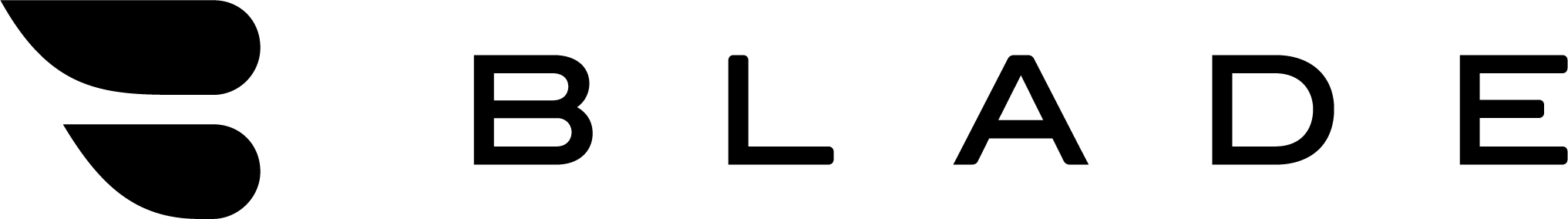
- Type: Public
- Traded as: Nasdaq: BLDE
- Industry: Transportation; Aviation
- Founded: May 2014; 12 years ago
- Founder: Rob Wiesenthal; Steve Martocci
- Headquarters: New York City, New York, United States
- Key people: Rob Wiesenthal; Melissa Tomkiel; Will Heyburn; Amir Cohen
- Services: Helicopter transfer and charter; Scheduled air service
- Revenue: $146.1 million (2022)
- Number of employees: 246 (2022)
- Website: blade.com

Blade Air Mobility, Inc. (stylized as BLADE) is an aviation company headquartered in New York City and incorporated in Delaware. Blade's urban air mobility platform provides air transportation for passengers and last-mile critical cargo, primarily using helicopters and amphibious aircraft for passenger routes in the United States, Canada, Southern Europe, and India, in addition to being one of the largest air medical transporters of human organs for transplant in the world. Blade began trading on the Nasdaq on May 10, 2021, via a SPAC merger.

== Business and operations ==
=== Short Distance ===
Blade Sikorsky S-76C++ at East Hampton Airport

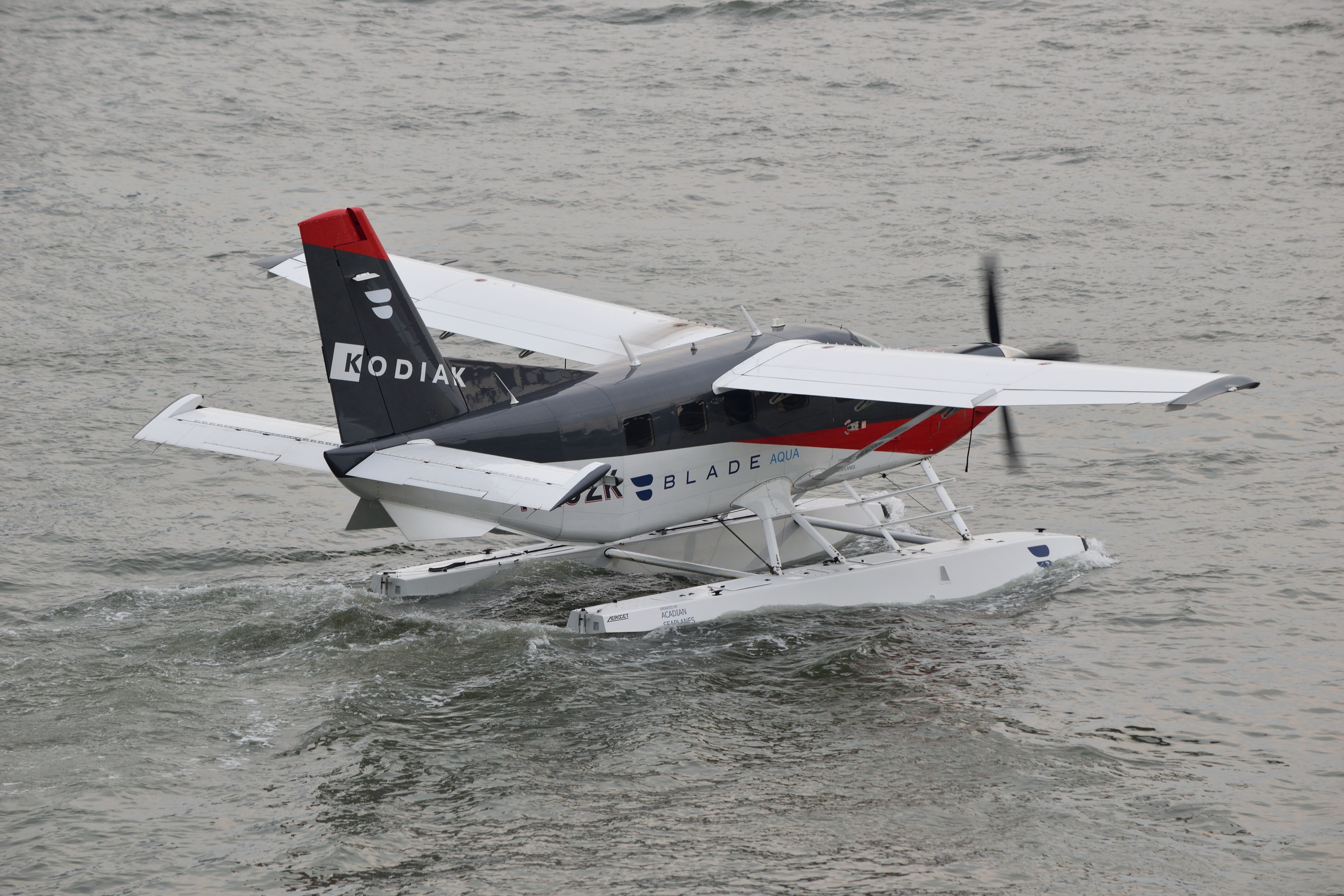
Blade seaplane leaving the New York Skyport

Blade's Short Distance business allows passengers to book seats directly from the Blade mobile app on flights operating between Blade terminals in New York, Vancouver and Southern Europe. Flights are typically between 10 and 100 miles in length and are primarily serviced on helicopters and amphibious seaplanes. Short Distance flights are also available on a full aircraft charter basis. Flights can also be crowdsourced at customer-selected times, where empty seats are sold to other flyers.

Blade's Short Distance business operates in markets with significant population density, where the primary competition is ground or ferry transportation. In 2022, Blade's Short Distance business generated $45 million in revenue.

Blade's first Short Distance route was launched in 2014, offering passenger service between Manhattan, Southampton, East Hampton, and Montauk. In March 2019, Blade launched BLADE Airport, which offers continuous service for passengers traveling between Manhattan and John F. Kennedy International Airport. BLADE Airport service was temporarily suspended during the COVID-19 pandemic, but was relaunched in June 2021 for passengers traveling between Manhattan and JFK Airport. In November 2021, Blade launched an additional BLADE Airport route for passengers traveling between Manhattan and Newark Liberty International Airport.

In December 2021, Blade entered the Vancouver market with the acquisition of the exclusive rights to Helijet's scheduled passenger business. At the time of the acquisition, Helijet was operating at an annualized revenue run-rate that was about 50% of its pre-COVID-19 level of US$15 million. In September 2022 Blade completed the acquisitions of the commercial passenger transport activities of three urban air mobility operators: Monacair SAM, Héli Sécurité, and Azur Hélicoptère.

==== Key routes ====
- Manhattan to/from JFK - helicopter transfers for passengers traveling between Blade terminals in Manhattan located at the West 30th Street Heliport or East 34th Street Heliport and John F. Kennedy International Airport located in Queens, NY.
- Manhattan to/from EWR - helicopter transfers for passengers traveling between the Blade terminal in Manhattan located at the West 30th Street Heliport and Newark Liberty International Airport located in Newark, NJ.
- Manhattan to/from the Hamptons - helicopter transfers for passengers traveling between the Blade terminals in Manhattan and various destinations on Long Island, including East Hampton, Sag Harbor, and Montauk.
- Vancouver to/from Victoria - helicopter transfers for passengers traveling between Vancouver Harbour and Victoria.
- Nice to/from Monaco - helicopter transfers for passengers traveling between Nice Côte d'Azur Airport and the Monaco Heliport.

=== MediMobility Organ Transport ===
In 2021 Blade's MediMobility Organ Transport business, acquired Trinity Air Medical, becoming the largest dedicated air transporter of human organs for transplant in the United States. The division provides hospitals and organ procurement organizations with an end-to-end multi-modal solution incorporating rotorcraft, fixed-wing aircraft, and ground vehicles. Blade MediMobility missions utilize the same aircraft that service passenger flights, with demand typically occurring at night, complementing consumer demand during the day. Blade believes organ transport represents a clear use case for future drone or EVA adoption, particularly given necessary infrastructure and landing zones are already in place at many hospitals. In 2022, Blade's Short Distance business generated $71.8 million in revenue.

=== Business model ===
Blade utilizes an asset-light business model in which the company does not own nor operate aircraft, but rather partners with a vast network of aircraft operators who are vetted for safety, operational excellence and financial wherewithal. Blade's business model was designed to be scalable and profitable using conventional aircraft, while providing the foundation to enable a seamless transition to electric vertical aircraft (EVA or eVTOL) in the future. Electric vertical aircraft are expected to offer reduced noise, zero emissions, and lower operating costs relative to conventional aircraft.

In April 2023, Blade's CEO, Robert Wiesenthal, said "the goal of Blade was to create the entire ecosystem required for EVAs outside of the manufacturing of the aircraft, the operating of the aircraft, and the maintenance of that aircraft". Instead, Blade primarily focuses on terminal infrastructure, technology, and brand recognition.

== History ==
=== 2014–2016 ===
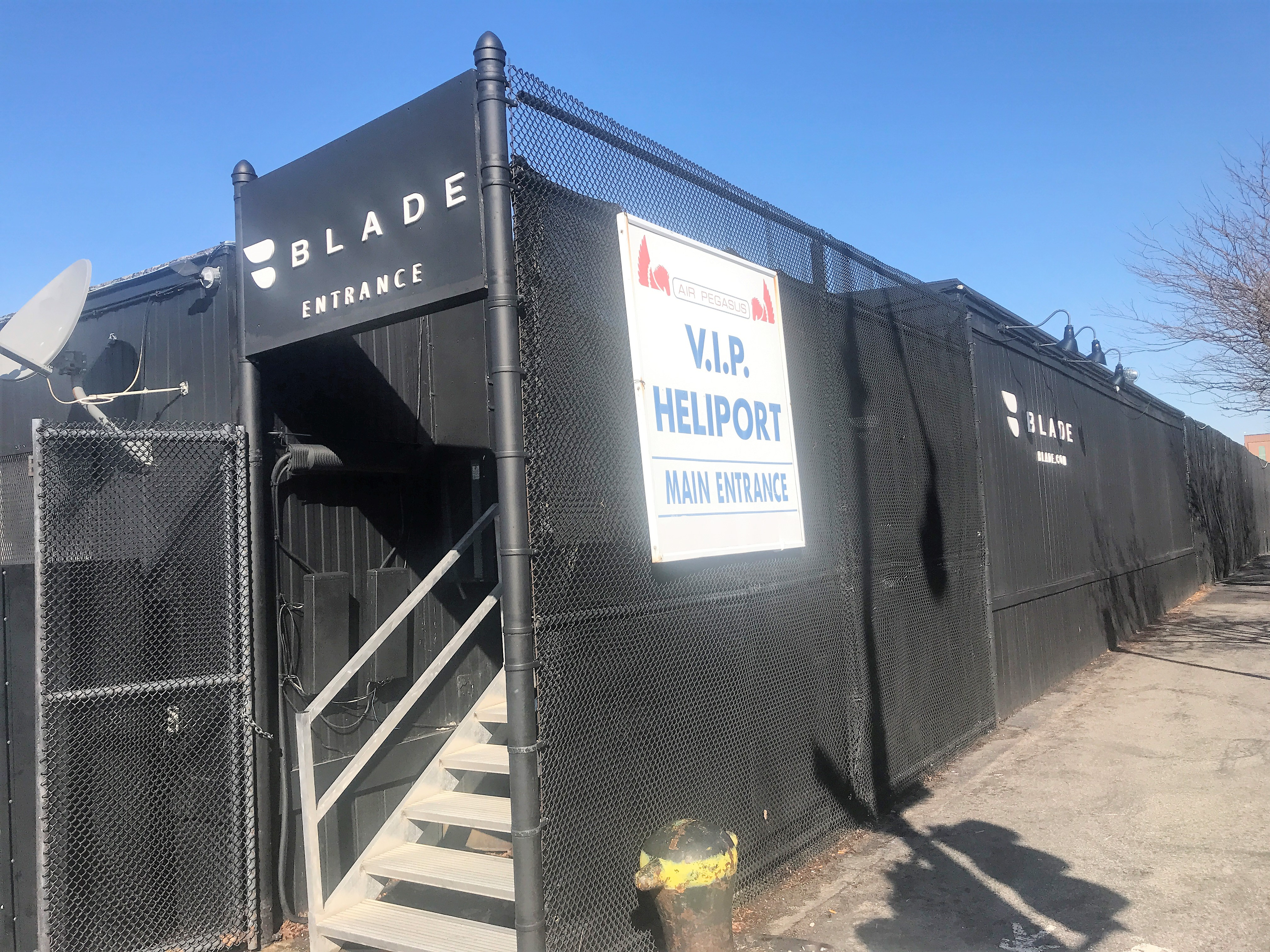
Blade Entrance to West 30th Street Heliport

Blade was founded by Robert S. Wiesenthal and launched on Memorial Day (May 26) of 2014, with service between Manhattan, Southampton, East Hampton, and Montauk.

Over the 2014 Fourth of July weekend, Blade partnered with Uber to power UberChopper, a service that allowed Uber users to book a helicopter through their mobile application to The Hamptons.

In December 2015, Blade expanded its offerings and launched BLADEone, a seasonal by-the-seat jet service between Manhattan and Miami or Manhattan and Aspen. The inaugural flight took place on December 3 in conjunction with Art Basel.

In September 2015 during the UN General Assembly and Pope Francis's visit to NYC in 2015, Blade offered a 6 minute cross town shuttle departing every 15 minutes.

During the 2016 Sundance Film Festival Blade provided jet service on the BLADEone jet between NYC and the festival. They created a lounge located in a residence on a private farm and offered heli transfers from Salt Lake City International Airport to the property, located minutes from downtown.

In partnership with Uber Boston, Blade launched Uber Air over Memorial Day 2016 with scheduled flights between Boston and the Blade Lounge in Nantucket. Utilizing a nine-passenger Cessna Grand Caravan turboprop plane from Boston to the island, Blade was able to cover the 90-mile distance in 40 minutes.

=== 2017–2019 ===
In 2017 it began service between Manhattan and The Hamptons and to more than 20 camps in Maine, Vermont, Pennsylvania, and upstate New York.

On March 22, 2018, Blade completed its Series B Financing. Lead investors Colony-North Star and Lerer-Hippeau were joined by Airbus Helicopters and LionTree Ventures.

In December 2018, Blade announced its intentions to launch an Urban Air Mobility Pilot Program in India. Blade is operating the service in partnership with equity investment firm Hunch Ventures. Blade India, launched in fall 2019, enables fliers to travel by helicopter between Blade Lounges at urban heliports. Initial routes connect the cities of Juhu and Mahalaxmi with heliports in Pune and Shirdi.

=== 2020–present ===
In 2020 in partnership with Andrew Saffir, creator of The Cinema Society, Blade hosted a socially distanced, drive-in premier of Disney+'s Artemis Fowl in June 2020.

In November 2020, Blade became the first aviation company to require pre-boarding coronavirus testing for flights within the United States. The tests were distributed by CrowdRX, a division of Global Medical Response.

On May 10, 2021, Blade became the first publicly traded urban air mobility company. In listing the company it changed its name from Blade Urban Air Mobility to Blade Air Mobility. The stock offering was handled through the SPAC merger of Experience Investment Corp. (sponsored by KSL Capital Partners) with BLADE Urban Air Mobility, Inc. The new company became BLADE Air Mobility. BLADE Urban Air became a wholly owned subsidiary.

In September 2021, Blade announced the acquisition of Trinity Air Medical, a nationwide organ logistics and transportation company, for an upfront purchase price of $23 million. Trinity's end-to-end services integrate air missions with ground transport.

In December 2021, Blade entered the Vancouver market with the acquisition of the exclusive rights to Helijet's scheduled passenger business, for which Blade paid approximately $12 million. At the time of the acquisition, Helijet was operating at an annualized revenue run-rate that was about 50% of its pre-COVID-19 level of US$15 million.

In May 2022, Blade announced it would acquire the asset-light commercial passenger transport activities of three European urban air mobility operators: Monacair SAM, Héli Sécurité and Azur Hélicoptère.

In June 2022, Blade announced a partnership with JetBlue in which JetBlue's Mosaic+ members would receive complimentary seats on Blade Airport helicopter transfers when connecting to or from JetBlue flights at JFK or EWR.

Blade conducted a test flight of an eVTOL aircraft at Westchester County Airport on February 14, 2023, marking the first time that such a piloted aircraft was tested in the tri-state area.

In August 2025, Joby Aviation agreed to acquire Blade's passenger rideshare business for $125 million.

== Opposition ==
There has been pushback within The Hamptons community against increased air traffic at the local East Hampton Airport. Opponents claim that noise levels have increased as a direct result of increased air traffic.

East Hampton Airport has long been owned and operated by the local municipality. This has caused a significant rift in the community, as politicians and residents fight over whether to accept Federal Aviation Administration (FAA) funds or not. Recently, the Town of East Hampton reached an agreement with the FAA to self-fund the airport, allowing them to impose stricter rules on air traffic.

On April 16, 2015, The Town of East Hampton voted to adopt strict laws limiting air traffic in and out of the East Hampton Airport. Beginning summer of 2015, there was a ban on all flights from 11:00PM to 7:00AM. Any aircraft that fell under the Town's classification of "noisy"—aircraft with an Effective Perceived Noise in Decibels (EPNdB) approach level of 91.0 or greater—was forbidden from taking off or landing from 8:00PM to 9:00AM all year and was limited to one landing and one takeoff per week. There is currently a lawsuit against the FAA for its part in waiving grant assurances that allowed the Town to enact these rules.

In September 2023, six protestors with the group Extinction Rebellion were arrested outside the W. 30th Street Heliport. The protestors targeted Blade and other operators for producing an outsize share of "luxury emissions".
