= Robert S. Wiesenthal =

American businessman (born 1967)

Rob Wiesenthal
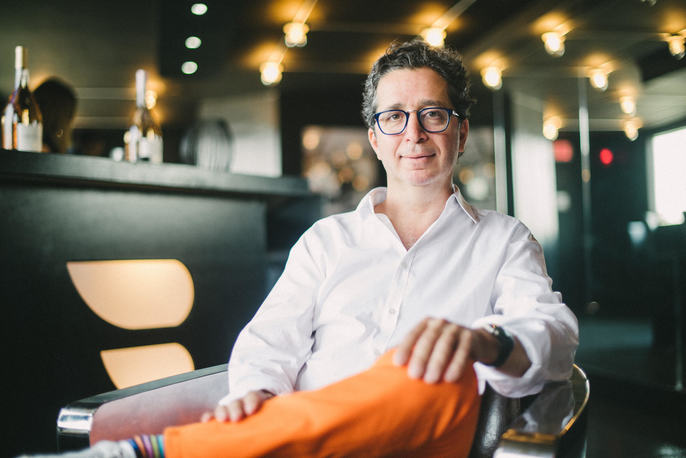
- Wiesenthal at Blade Lounge West
- Born: June 22, 1967 (age 59)
- Education: University of Rochester (B.A.)
- Title: Founder & CEO, Blade
- Board member of: TripAdvisor; Starz
- Spouse: Linnea Conrad (divorced)
- Children: 2

Robert S. Wiesenthal (born June 22, 1967) is an American businessman.

Until June 2012, Wiesenthal was executive vice president and chief financial officer of Sony Corporation of America, executive vice president, chief strategy officer, Sony Entertainment Inc., and group executive, Sony Corporation, leading corporate development, and mergers and acquisitions. From 2012 to June 2015, he was chief operating officer of Warner Music Group. Wiesenthal now heads Blade, an aviation start-up.

== Early life ==
Wiesenthal was raised in Manhattan, New York City, and shared a love of gadgets and entertainment with his father, Richard, who sold “I Love Lucy” reruns for Telepictures in Latin America. He studied robotics in his spare time, and co-wrote a book for Ziff Davis on personal computers when he was in high school. Wiesenthal graduated from the University of Rochester, receiving a B.A. degree cum laude in Political Science in 1988.

== Business career ==
=== Prior to Sony ===
Early in his career, Bruce Wasserstein hired Wiesenthal as a junior investment banker at First Boston after he had fixed Wasserstein's printer, where at the time he was a summer intern providing technical support. “I fixed the right guy’s printer,” he said.

At First Boston, he was a member of its mergers & acquisitions group, beginning in 1986, later joining their Media group in 1993. He was named managing director of Credit Suisse First Boston (or CSFB) in 1999 and headed its entertainment and digital media efforts under Frank Quattrone.

As one of CSFB's lead media bankers, notable transactions on which he was an advisor included Seagram’s $5.7 billion acquisition of MCA Inc., Liberty Media’s merger with TCI, News Corp’s $3.2 billion purchase of New World Communications and Sony Pictures Entertainment Inc.’s acquisition of Telemundo, the nation’s second largest Spanish televisual media sector.

=== Sony ===
On June 27, 2000, Sir Howard Stringer, Sony Corp.'s Chairman and Chief Executive Officer, hired Wiesenthal as Chief Strategic Officer for Sony Broadband Entertainment, a move described in Fortune as one of Stringer’s “smartest moves”. Sony Broadband Entertainment (now known as Sony Entertainment) was established in March 2000 to house the corporation's U.S. entertainment assets, its film and television studio and music group.

Wiesenthal moved quickly to buy and sell stakes in a variety of businesses; in 2001, he sold 50 percent of Sony's Game Show Network to Liberty Digital, and Sony's stake in Telemundo to NBCUniversal, a deal worth over $2 billion. He had Sony join with Philips N.V. to buy InterTrust Technologies, the owner of patents for most digital-rights-management technologies. He negotiated "strategic transactions" between Sony and Yahoo Inc. and then-AOL Time Warner Inc. At Sony Pictures Entertainment, he oversaw a corporate restructuring called "the 21st Century Studio Project," that resulted in savings of over $150 million at Sony's studio operations. Among the biggest changes was at Sony Pictures’ U.S. network television production, where he greatly reduced the number of television series it produced. Wiesenthal told The New York Times, "We asked ourselves the tough questions in each of Sony Pictures’ businesses to ensure the underlying economics made sense in the current environment."

On January 16, 2002, Wiesenthal was promoted to Sony's executive vice president and chief financial officer, a move that the Wall Street Journal described as a strategy that Sony used to improve its stature in the business world. In April 2003, he was named to a seven-member committee of executives to oversee the operations of Sony Pictures Entertainment. In June, 2005, after Stringer was promoted to chief executive of Sony Corporation, he gave Wiesenthal the additional responsibility of head of corporate development and mergers and acquisitions for Sony Corporation. During his tenure, Wiesenthal oversaw all financial aspects of Sony Corporation of America across its operating companies, including budget setting, long range planning, capital, and financing decisions. He was also responsible for Sony's U.S. Investor Relations activities. He was a member of Sony Pictures Entertainment's Operating Committee and was on the boards of directors of Sony Music Entertainment and Sony Ericsson Mobile Communications.

In late 2005, after being given responsibility for Sony's Music publishing joint venture, Sony/ATV, Wiesenthal sent a fax to Michael Jackson knowing that the pop singer (who died June 25, 2009) was about to default on a loan secured by his stake in the venture and offered to discuss ways to help. Sony did not want Jackson's portion of Sony/ATV to wind up in bankruptcy court. Wiesenthal traveled to the Middle East and met Jackson in Dubai to inform him that Sony had backers from Citi who were willing to refinance his ATV debt on much better terms. In exchange, Sony obtained greater operational control over the business, a right of refusal on his stake, and an option to buy half of Jackson's half for approximately $250 million. These moves helped consolidate Sony's control of the unit.

After obtaining greater authority over the operations of Sony/ATV, Wiesenthal led Sony/ATV's acquisitions of the Leiber Stoller and Viacom's Famous Music catalogs in 2007. In 2007, in an effort to bolster the management strength of Sony's publishing operations, Wiesenthal recruited Martin Bandier, chairman and co-chief executive of EMI Group's EMI Music Publishing unit, to be chief executive of the unit. Wiesenthal believes music publishing companies are well equipped to compete and be successful in the music industry of the future. He said, "Lenders—whether private lenders or banks—feel much more comfortable with the credit quality of publishing vs. recorded music. In terms of the banks I speak with, there's clearly an interest on the publishing side."

In 2008, Wiesenthal and his corporate development team enabled Sony to be the first company to transmit a feature film directly to internet-connected televisions that were not covered by conventional cable and satellite distributors. They offered the film Hancock, featuring Will Smith, for a fee to customers with Sony's internet-connected televisions, prior to the film's availability on DVD. At the time, laptops and PC's were largely the only method in which customers could view digital streams of feature content.

Also in 2008, he led the transaction to buy Bertelsmann out of its half of Sony BMG, ending a joint venture formed in 2004. Stringer said the "new Sony Music would give the group 'far more flexibility' to use music in its film and television units, and in electronics, including the PlayStation". Nancy Peretsman of Allen & Co. described Wiesenthal as "relatively egoless" and "always focused on the outcome". In his role at Sony Entertainment, he also oversaw Sony/ATV Music Publishing, which was established in 1995 as a joint venture between Sony and trusts formed by Michael Jackson.

After separating music publishing from Sony's music assets after the merger of Sony Music and BMG's Music Group, Howard Stringer charged Wiesenthal with the responsibility to grow Sony/ATV Music publishing via acquisition, a strategy that had previously fallen to the wayside when the business was previously part of Sony's Music unit. At the time, Sony/ATV, was the smallest of the major music publishing companies.

In 2010, Wiesenthal and David Zaslav, CEO of Discovery Communications, conceived of and structured a partnership bringing together the largest players in 3D to create the world's first 24-hour 3D network. The network, 3NET, launched on DirecTV in 2011 as a partnership between Sony, Discovery Communications and IMAX. Sony owns 33% of the venture and Wiesenthal sits on its board of directors. Wiesenthal also championed the Sony Dash, the world's first Internet connected alarm clock for the bedside or desktop.

In 2011, Wiesenthal orchestrated a complex deal acquiring EMI Publishing for $2.2 billion to an investor consortium led by Sony. The investor group included media mogul David Geffen, the estate of Michael Jackson, Blackstone's GSO's Capital Partners, Mubadala Development Company (the investment arm of Abu Dhabi), and Jynwel Capital of Hong Kong. "We found long-term investors, who are not just looking at the short-term returns typical of private equity," Wiesenthal said. The New York Times, in a Deals of the Year wrap-up, called it the "sleeper deal of 2011," one that "might have been the most interesting." Billboard described Wiesenthal as a "winner" in the deal: he helped assemble a consortium of investors to buy EMI Music Publishing. As a result of the transaction, Sony now controls the largest collection of publishing copyrights in the world.” Bob Pittman, CEO of Clear Channel Communications said, "He took it from being insignificant to being the biggest."

As Sony entered the tablet market in 2011, Wiesenthal publicly discussed the important role of the marriage of tablets and television can play in the emerging connected television business. He told a Goldman Sachs conference in New York that, although five years previously, "it was all about the boxes; TiVo, Slingbox, Roku, I think the consumers really have box exhaustion." In their place, TVs can evolve so they only have one wire: the power cord. Consumers, in turn, he said, will use tablets to access video content from the Cloud and control the TV screen.

=== Warner Music Group ===
On January 2, 2013, Wiesenthal was hired as Chief Operating Office, Warner Music Group in an effort to bolster the company's M&A, corporate development, and digital initiatives.

In early 2013, Wiesenthal played a key role in the company's acquisition of Parlophone, one of the world's leading recorded music companies and home to Coldplay, David Guetta, and Pink Floyd.

In September 2013, Wiesenthal led the effort to architect and launch a multi-platform alliance between Warner Music Group and Clear Channel Communications, the largest radio station operator in the United States. The New York Times said the deal, "re-writes the rules on royalties".

In early 2015, Wiesenthal negotiated an alliance on behalf of Warner Music Group with Snapchat to become the very first music company to have a channel on the Discover platform. With the Discover feature, companies could refresh “videos daily [and] create major promotional opportunities that [would] be monetized through sponsorship and advertising,” Wiesenthal stated in an interview with Billboard. Under the Warner Music Group section, Snapchat users could view sneak-peaks of music videos, daily headlines, advertisements, and promotions.

In June 2015, Wiesenthal departed Warner Music to join Blade as CEO.

=== Blade Urban Air Mobility ===
Rob Wiesenthal incubated Blade in early 2014 as the first digitally powered short-distance aviation and Urban Air Mobility platform. It launched in May 2014, servicing the New York resort communities of Southampton and East Hampton from New York City by helicopter. In the fall of 2014, the company raised $5 million in a seed round with principal investors David Zaslav, CEO of Discovery Communication; IAC Inc. chairman Barry Diller; former Alphabet chairman Eric Schmidt, and iHeartRadio chairman and CEO Robert Pittman.

Blade is known to operate an asset-light business model wherein Blade does not own or manage the flights; instead, Blade partners with third-party aircraft operators. The model relies on using regular aircraft with the eventual aim of moving towards Electric Vertical Aircraft (“EVA” or "EVTOL") in the future.According to those supporting EVA technology, EVA technology aircraft are meant to be quieter and more fuel-efficient compared to regular aircraft.

Blade's first Short Distance route was launched in 2014, offering passenger service between Manhattan, Southampton, East Hampton, and Montauk. In March 2019, Blade launched BLADE Airport, which offers continuous service for passengers traveling between Manhattan and John F. Kennedy International Airport. BLADE Airport service was temporarily suspended during the COVID-19 pandemic, but was relaunched in June 2021 for passengers traveling between Manhattan and JFK Airport. In November 2021, Blade launched an additional BLADE Airport route for passengers traveling between Manhattan and Newark Liberty International Airport.

The company's Blade airport transfers enabled Blade to become the largest arranger of helicopter flights between Manhattan and all New York area airports. Single seats on daily flights from Manhattan to area airports start at $195. This service reduces travel time in comparison to driving. Blade's alliance with American Airlines allows passengers flying American between JFK and LAX to deplane directly from the jetway on to the tarmac, where they are transferred by car to an awaiting helicopter for a short trip to the city center, bypassing commercial airline terminals.

In addition to single engine, twin-engine, and cabin class helicopters, Blade also utilizes amphibious seaplanes, turboprops, and jet aircraft for certain routes. Blade's accessible fleet include aircraft from 29 operators across the U.S. Blade neither owns nor operates aircraft.

Blade operates 12 passenger terminals, including three in India, and plans to transition to using electric vertical aircraft (EVA).

Additionally, the company is now in its fifth year offering seasonal scheduled jet service between New York and Miami, Florida. The BLADEone jet service, which utilizes a 16-person jet (retrofitted from 65-passenger commercial use), is harmonized with helicopter flights to enable passengers to depart from or arrive directly in Manhattan rather than an area airport. In 2020, the company added a route between New York and Aspen.

In late March 22, 2018, the company completed its Series B Financing. Lead investors Colony-North Star and Lerer-Hippeau were joined by Airbus Helicopters and LionTree Ventures. Approximately $38 million was raised.

In November 2020, Blade became the first aviation company to require pre-boarding coronavirus testing for flights within the United States. The tests were distributed by CrowdRX, a division of Global Medical Response.

On May 10, 2021, Blade became the first publicly traded urban air mobility company. In listing the company it changed its name from Blade Urban Air Mobility to Blade Air Mobility. The stock offering was handled through the merger of Experience Investment Corp. (sponsored by KSL Capital Partners) with BLADE Urban Air Mobility, Inc. The new company became BLADE Air Mobility. BLADE Urban Air became a wholly owned subsidiary.

In September 2021, Blade announced the acquisition of Trinity Air Medical, a nationwide organ logistics and transportation company, for an upfront purchase price of $23 million. Trinity's end-to-end services integrate air missions with ground transport.

In December 2021, Blade entered the Vancouver market with the acquisition of the exclusive rights to Helijet's scheduled passenger business, for which Blade paid approximately $12 million. At the time of the acquisition, Helijet was operating at an annualized revenue run-rate that was about 50% of its pre-COVID-19 level of US$15 million.

In May 2022, Blade announced it would acquire the asset-light commercial passenger transport activities of three European urban air mobility operators - Monacair SAM, Héli Sécurité, and Azur Hélicoptère.

In June 2022, Blade announced a partnership with JetBlue in which JetBlue's Mosaic+ members would receive complimentary seats on Blade Airport helicopter transfers when connecting to or from JetBlue flights at JFK or EWR.

Blade conducted a test flight of an EVTOL aircraft at Westchester County Airport on February 14, 2023, marking the first time that such a piloted aircraft was tested in the tri-state area.

== Achievements ==
Crain's New York Business named him on its “40 Under 40” list in 2003.

In 2010, Wiesenthal was an inductee of the World Economic Forum’s Young Global Leaders, along with Sergey Brin of Google, Mark Zuckerberg of Facebook, Peter Thiel of PayPal, and others.

In 2014, he was named to the Billboard Power 100, an annual survey of the most powerful people in the music business as determined by Billboard Magazine.

In October 2015, the company he co-founded, BLADE, was named one the "100 Hottest Startups in New York City" as determined by Business Insider.

He serves on the board of directors of Entercom Communications Corp., the fourth largest radio broadcaster in the U.S., TripAdvisor, Inc. (the second largest East Coast-based Internet company by market capitalization), global pay-TV network operator Starz as well as Jawbone, a leading connected consumer device company specializing in personal wellness technology and audio products.

He is a mentor of Techstars NYC, a mentorship-driven start-up accelerator and seed fund that helps emerging digital companies launch and obtain strategic funding.

== Personal life ==
Wiesenthal lives in New York City. He had raced Formula Ford cars in the U.S. which led to his passion of car collecting and subsequently to creating with a partner the Bridgehampton Motoring Club, the leading Active Storage Collector car facility in the U.S.

During Roger Waters' 2010 U.S. tour "The Wall", Wiesenthal played the ukulele with Waters and his band during a set for two dates at Madison Square Garden. Wiesenthal was previously married to the founder and chief executive of GingerBread Capital, Linnea Conrad Roberts. They have one son, Richard (born 1997), who is a music producer. He also has a daughter, Lila (born 2010) with former partner Kathrine Paige Nelson.
