= Ogden Point =

Port in Victoria Harbour

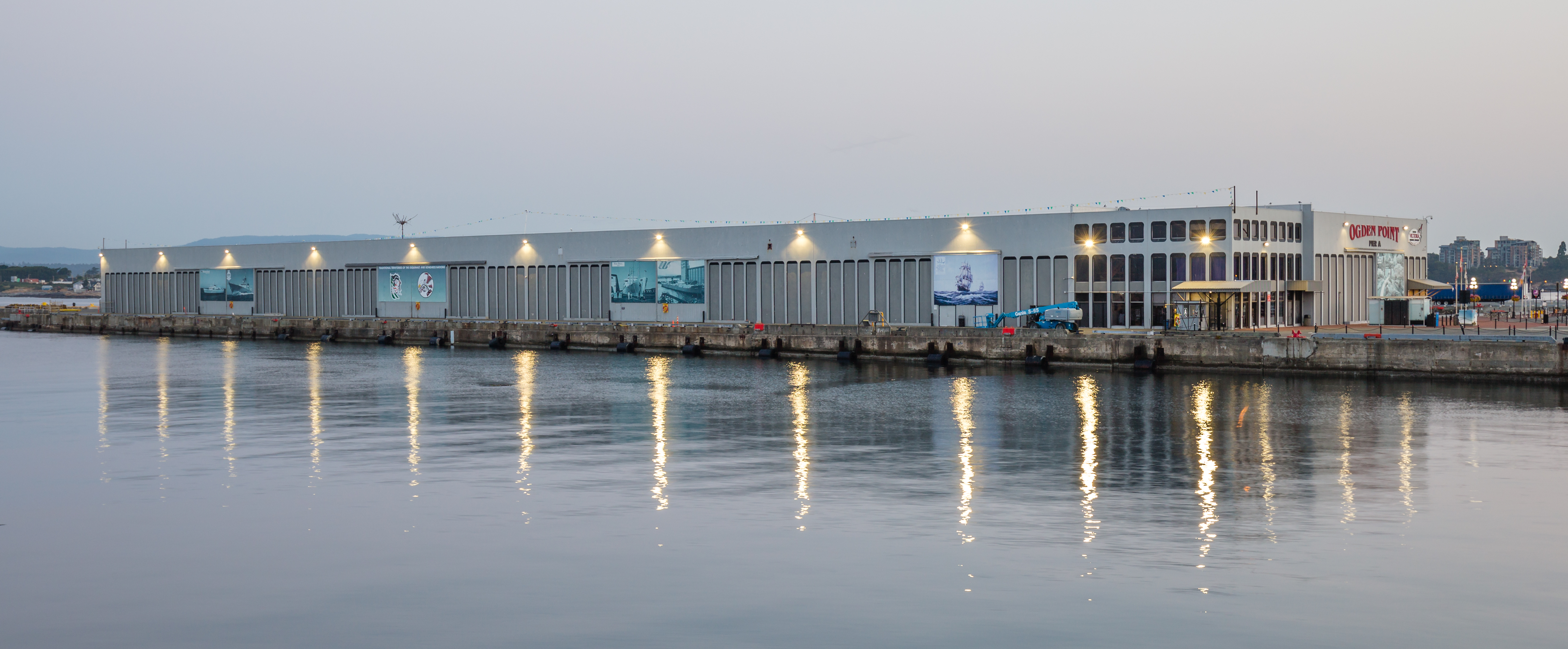
Odgen Point in 2018, before sunrise

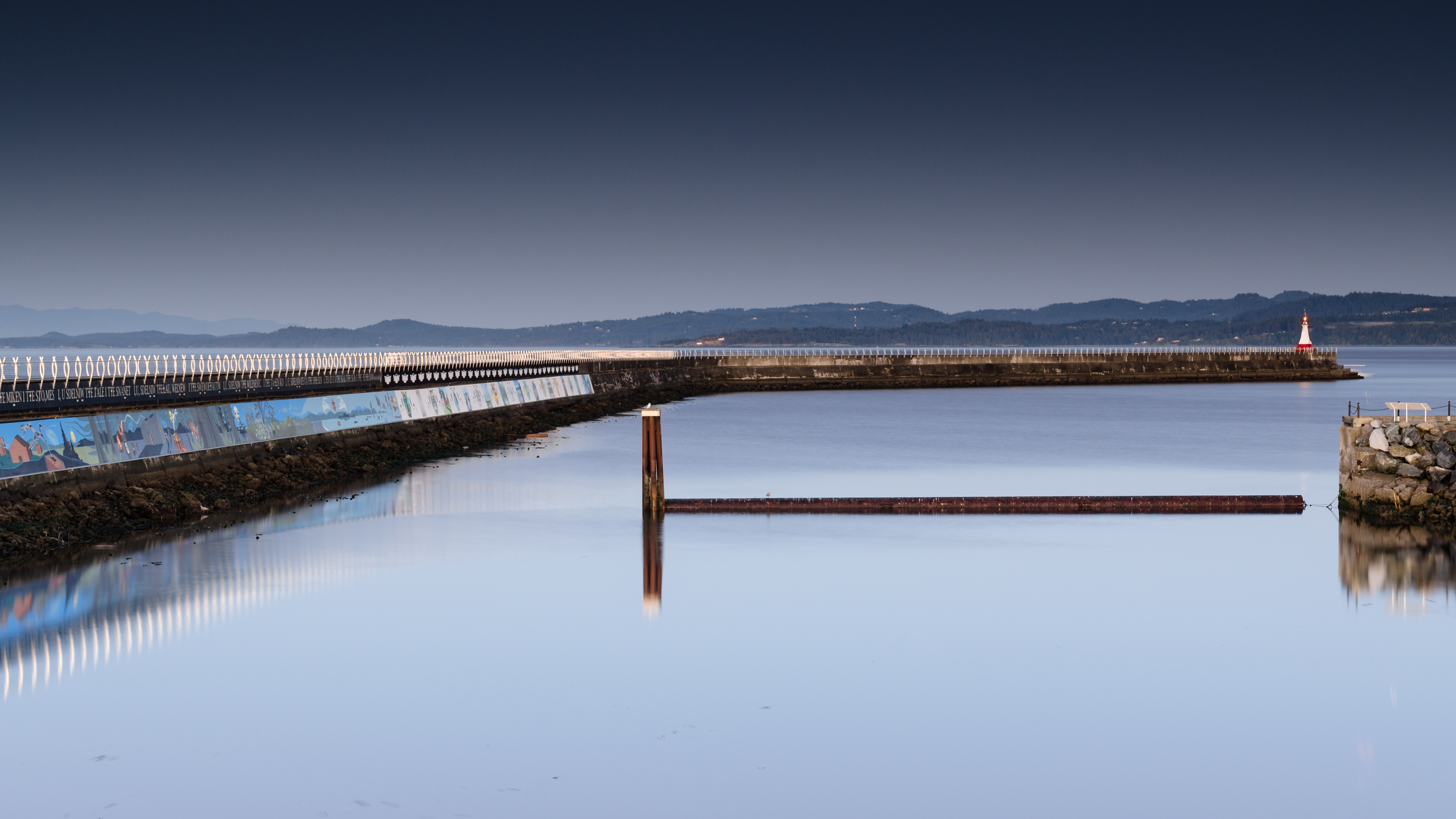
Odgen Point's breakwater at dawn

Ogden Point is a deep water port facility located in the southwestern corner of the city of Victoria, British Columbia, Canada. Its advantageous geographic location on the southern tip of Vancouver Island, by the Strait of Juan de Fuca, close to major population centres Vancouver and Seattle, has made it an attractive cruise ship destination. It also serves as a ship repair and supply facility for cruise ships and other vessels such as deep sea cable laying ships. Ogden Point also has a heliport with frequent service to Vancouver Harbour, Vancouver International Airport, and Seattle. The port lies at the eastern entrance of Victoria Harbour. For smaller boats there is boat ramp for trailerable boats.

The cruise ship facility is the busiest port of call in Canada and is scheduled to handle 245 ship visits in 2018, with more than twenty ships carrying up to 3,000 passengers each from ten cruise lines expected to call between late April and early October. Most visits are single day or evening visits from liners cruising to Alaska from Seattle, Los Angeles, or San Francisco, but there are also cruises of the Pacific Northwest, often including Vancouver and/or Seattle.

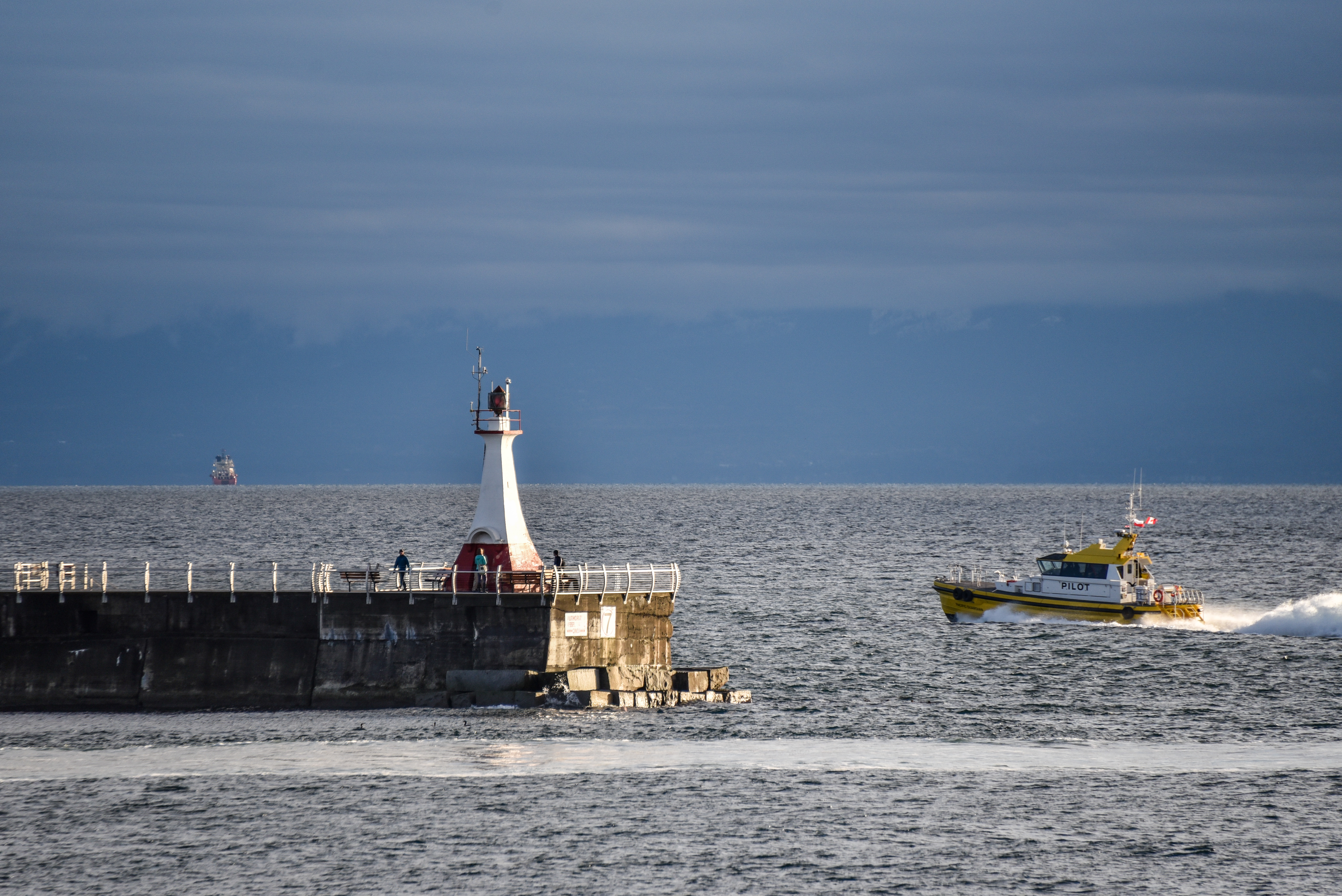
Pilot boat rounding Ogden Point Breakwater Lighthouse and heading out to a ship at Brotchie Pilot Boarding Station.

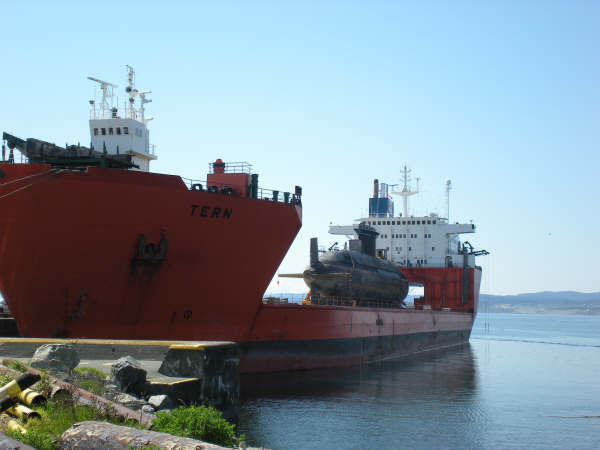
The MV Tern carrying the submarine HMCS Chicoutimi (SSK 879) to Ogden Point, 30 April 2009

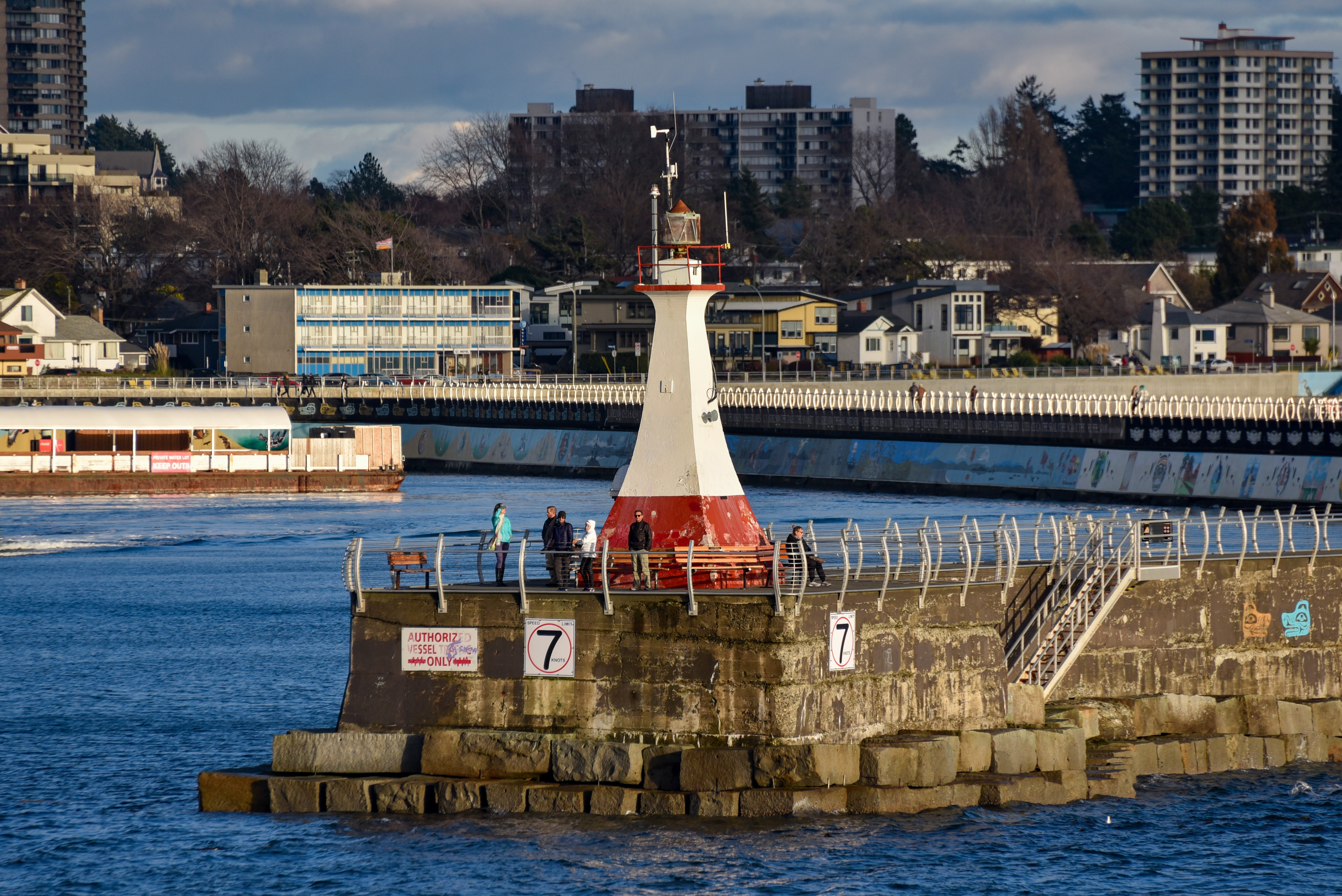
Ogden Point Breakwater Lighthouse

== History ==
Ogden Point was named after Peter Skene Ogden (1790–1854), who was a prominent trader and explorer for the Hudson's Bay Company. The piers at Ogden Point were built in the early 20th century by the city of Victoria in anticipation of a growth in shipping due to the opening of the Panama Canal. In 1916 the US Hydrographic Office published a Coast Pilots guide that referred to the piers as the "Ocean Docks". That edition of Coast Pilots also mentioned that the breakwater south of Pier A was under construction in 1915. The breakwater was completed in 1916 and the piers were completed in 1918. Later in the century Victoria Machinery Depot built some of the first vessels for BC Ferries and other customers in the 1960s using Ogden Point for the larger ships.

In 2001 the Norwegian Sky arrived from Seattle, becoming the first weekly cruise vessel to call on Ogden Point.

In 2008, Ogden Point saw the arrival of 202 cruise ships and in excess of 380,000 passengers. The cruise ship terminal is considered an in transit port as presently no ships are home ported (embarked or disembarked) at this facility. In 2008 the facility was extensively rebranded in the Greater Victoria Harbour Authority's red, grey and black colour scheme.

In 2009 Ogden Point saw the arrival of 228 cruise ships from a variety of cruise lines including Princess Cruises, Holland America Line, Celebrity Cruises, Norwegian Cruise Line, Crystal Cruises and ResidenSea. These calls brought over 400,000 visitors to the city of Victoria between April 23 and October 14, 2009.

== Facilities ==
Victoria Harbour (Camel Point) Heliport
- IATA: none; ICAO: CBF7

Summary
- Airport type: Private
- Operator: Pacific Heliport Services
- Serves: Victoria, British Columbia
- Location: Victoria Harbour
- Time zone: MST (UTC−07:00)
- Elevation AMSL: 15 ft / 5 m
- Coordinates: 48°25′05″N 123°23′17″W
- Website: www.helijet.com

Map
- Location in British Columbia

Helipads
| Number | Length | | Surface |
| Number | ft | m | Surface |
|---|---|---|---|
| Pad-1 | 53 (dia) | 16 (dia) | Concrete / asphalt |
| Pad-2 | 53 (dia) | 16 (dia) | Concrete / asphalt |
| Pad-3 | 73 (dia) | 22 (dia) | Concrete / asphalt |
| Pad-4 | 53 (dia) | 16 (dia) | Concrete / asphalt |
- Source: Canada Flight Supplement

The 12-hectare (30-acre) port facility has two finger piers designated Pier A (to the south) and Pier B (to the north). Berths on each pier are designated North and South. South A extends for 335 metres (1,100 ft), North A extends for 243 metres (800 ft). Pier B berths were extended to 317 metres (1,040 ft) by installing a mooring dolphin in 2009. Each berth can accommodate a vessel with a draft in excess of 10 metres (33 ft) at low tide. Although there are four berths, a maximum of three ships can be accommodated in port at any one time due to the close proximity of North A and South B. Canada Border Services Agency facilities are located at each pier. Pier A also houses a 9,290-square-metre (100,000 sq ft) warehouse, complete with cable ship spooling apparatus and cable storage facility.

Ogden Point has break bulk cargo docks. Vessels up to 300 metres (980 ft) can be accommodated.

Cruise ships calling at Ogden Point's Cruise Ship Terminal usually provide shore excursions for passengers. These may include tours of the Butchart Gardens, city tours, visits to Craigdarroch Castle, pub tours, Empress Hotel afternoon tea, whale watching, Chinatown, Victoria and horse-drawn trolley tours.

During the cruise season, services to guests include a shuttle bus service operated by Wilson's Transportation to provide guests an alternative to the 30-minute walk to downtown Victoria. Public buses (#30/31) stop along Dallas Road on their way to downtown Victoria. Taxi cabs and limousines are also available onsite.

Western Stevedoring is under contract from the Greater Victoria Harbour Authority to manage the facility and Cruise Terminal.

The Camel Point heliport (TC LID: CBF7) is operated by Pacific Heliport Services and is located just northeast of Pier B.

For smaller boats there is a public boat ramp owned and operated by the Greater Victoria Harbour Authority. Fee for launch includes parking, if available.

Ogden Point has world-renowned cold water diving for any level of divers. Giant Pacific octopus, wolf eels, kelp, sea anemones, nudibranchs and multiple fish and crustacean species can be found even at the shallowest depths. Multiple groups of reef balls were placed in 2008 to study the migration of species from the break-wall outwards. Due to currents and other hazards found in any diving environment, a discover local diving tour with a dive professional is advised.

At one time a car float came to Ogden Point.

== See also ==
- Victoria Harbour facilities
