= Heli Air Monaco =

Flag carrier of Monaco

IATA	ICAO	Call sign
YO	MCM	HELI AIR
- Founded: 1976
- Hubs: Monaco Heliport
- Fleet size: 14
- Destinations: Nice Airport (scheduled flights every twenty minutes)
- Headquarters: Monaco
- Website: http://www.heliairmonaco.com

Heli Air Monaco is the flag carrier of Monaco.

== History ==
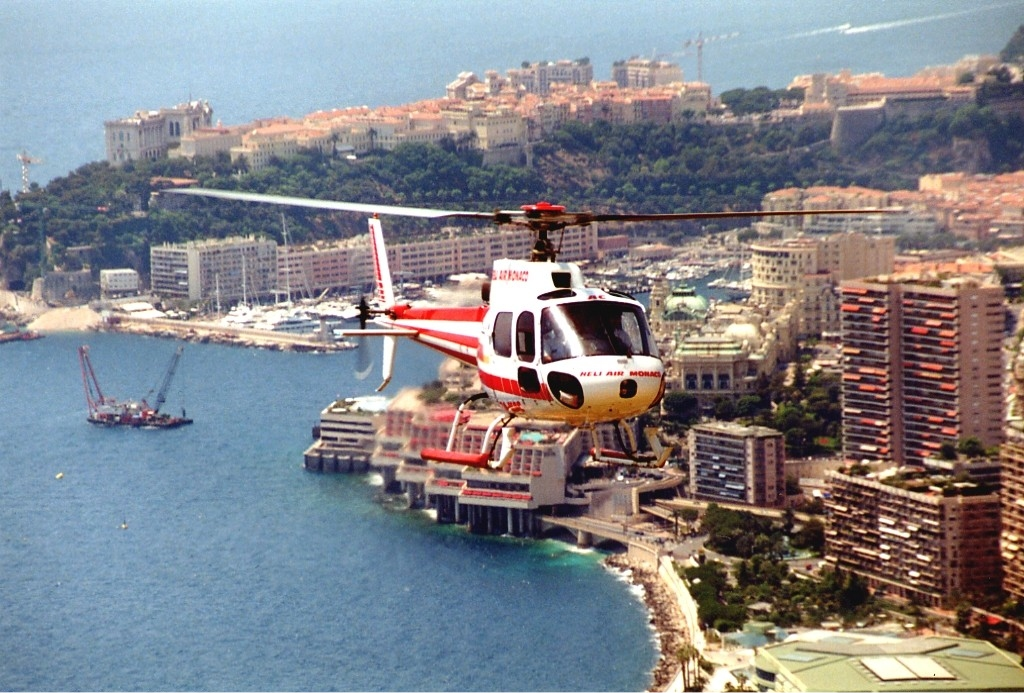
Eurocopter AS350 of Heli Air Monaco flying over the Vista Palace Hotel in Monte Carlo.

Heli Air Monaco was founded in 1976 with the support of Prince Rainier III, and began operations from the Monaco Heliport, located in the Fontvieille quarter of Monaco, from where it now operates regular shuttle services between Monaco Heliport and Nice Airport (an average 24 transfers a day), and offers on request flights from Monaco and Nice to other European destinations including the Alps, Corsica, the French Riviera, Italy and Switzerland.

Initial services were operated with a single Enstrom F-28 helicopter, and in the first year of operations, the airline flew 747 passengers. In order to meet demand a Bell 206 JetRanger was acquired in 1976, and by 1980 15,237 passengers had been carried. Free shuttle service in Monaco was introduced in 1983, a year in which 39,673 passengers were carried. A Eurocopter Dauphin was added to the fleet in 1991, joining a fleet made up of six Eurocopter AS350s and a Bell 206 JetRanger. The number of passengers carried in 1991 increased to some 94,300. 2000 saw the airline carrying 103,000 passengers and passing the 1,500,000 passengers carried mark.

In September 2003, the airline ordered a number of six-seat Eurocopter EC130 B4 to replace the Eurocopter Squirrels in the fleet.

On 8 June 2004, a Heli Air Monaco AS350 on a scheduled flight from Monaco to Nice crashed into the sea 2.16 kilometres off Saint-Jean-Cap-Ferrat, killing the pilot and four passengers.

Due to a drop in the number of passengers being carried, in February 2009 Heli Air Monaco laid off ten employees and announced that an additional thirty employees may be laid off if the situation does not improve. Jacques Crovetto, the CEO of the company, noted that the Monegasque government takes taxes from the company, but gives no support to the company in return. The airline accounts for 90-95% of traffic at the Monaco Heliport, and its services are not subsidised. Crovetto also showed disdain for a decision by the Monegasque authorities to bar the company's minivans from operating in the bus lanes in Monaco, but in September 2009, he expressed hope that the decision would be overturned. He also noted that due to the re-registration of passengers in Nice being required, it is almost as quick to take a taxi between Monaco and Nice. According to Heli Air Monaco, the Monaco-Nice route has a natural ceiling of 130,000 passengers per year, but in January 2009 the company only carried 3,450 passengers.

== See also ==
- List of helicopter airlines
