= Monacair =

Helicopter company based in Monaco

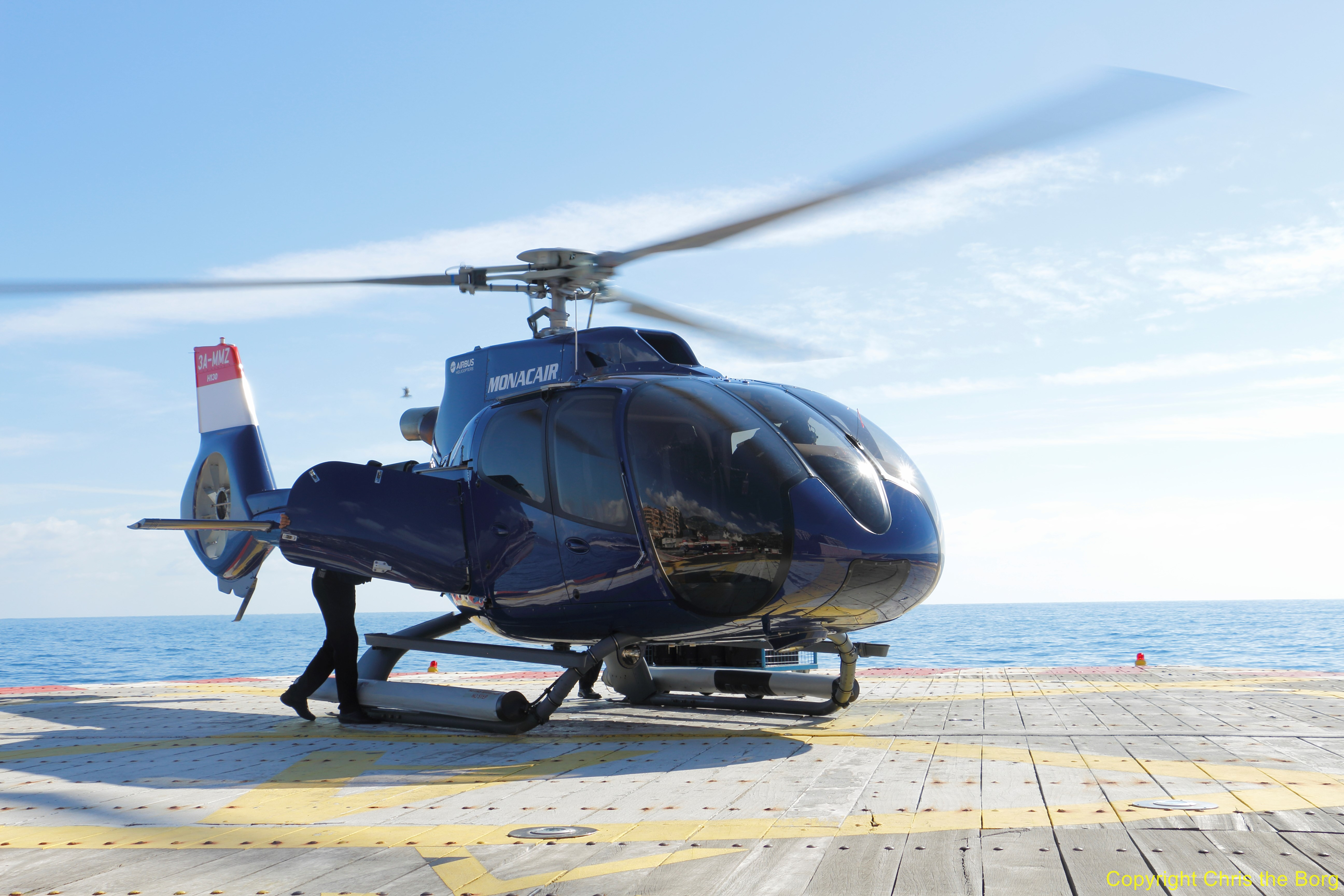
IATA	ICAO	Call sign
QM	MCR	MONACAIR
- Founded: 1988
- AOC #: MC.003
- Operating bases: Monaco Heliport; Nice Airport; Cannes; Saint Tropez; Paris; Genève; Le Castellet
- Hubs: Monaco Heliport
- Secondary hubs: Nice Airport
- Destinations: 1 (Scheduled)
- Headquarters: Monaco
- Key people: Damien Mazaudier (Managing Director)
- Website: https://www.monacair.mc/en/

Monacair is a Monegasque helicopter company based at Monaco Heliport, Monaco. The airline provides various services, including regular helicopter transfers between Nice Côte d'Azur Airport and Monaco, private flights and luxury experiences, helicopter tours, as well as helicopter maintenance, management, and handling services.

By appointment of Albert II, Prince of Monaco, the company has also provides transport for the Princely Family of Monaco, the Government of Monaco, and several Heads of State visiting the Principality.

== History ==
Monacair was founded in 1988 by Stefano Casiraghi. Today the majority shareholder are his sons Pierre and Andrea Casiraghi, nephews of Albert II, Prince of Monaco. Between the two Casiraghi brothers, they own a total of 70% of the company, with about 20% of the shares being retained by the younger brother's brother-in-law, John Elkann.

Since 1999, the company has been Official supplier to H.S.H the Sovereign Prince of Monaco, Albert II.

In 2015 the airline signed a firm order for 6 Airbus Helicopters H130 aircraft for delivery between December 2015 and May 2016.

On 1 January 2016, the Princely Government of Monaco assigned Monacair as the sole operator of the regular transfer service between Nice Côte d'Azur Airport and Monaco.

Since 2016, Monacair has made a different partnership with several airline companies like Air France, KLM, HOP!, Air Corsica, Emirates, enabling passengers to enjoy check-in services and boarding pass delivery in Monaco in order to delay their departure time from the Principality to only one hour before the boarding gate deadline at Nice Côte d'Azur Airport.

Following these interline agreements, Monacair has become a regular partner of the Tourist and Convention Authority of Monaco, local institutions and major tradeshows and conferences as its regular transfer services allows for an easier transfer between Nice Airport and the Principality.

In May 2022, Blade Air Mobility entered into a €48 million definitive agreement to acquire the commercial passenger transport activities, terminal operations, and flight routes of Monacair, establishing Blade as the exclusive booking platform for Monacair's retained helicopter fleet.

== Services ==
Since January 2016, Monacair has been the official and only Monegasque operator of the Regular Line between Monaco and Nice Côte d’Azur International Airport. The company operates over 40 daily flights, scheduled every 15 minutes. Based at Monaco’s heliport and at all Nice Côte d’Azur Airport terminals, Monacair offers a wide range of services in the helicopter industry:

- Helicopter management, including consulting, housing, pilots, refueling and maintenance.
- Private chartered flights to all destinations.
- Handling of passengers, including embarkation/disembarkation, and luggage handling.
- Handling of crew for non-based private helicopters.
- Helicopter maintenance.

In September 2015, soon after Monacair won the Gouvernement Princier de Monaco’s tender call, an order for six brand-new single-engine H130 helicopters, fitted with enlarged trunks, was placed. The delivery was received between December 2015 and the end of April 2016. These helicopters are air-conditioned and are mostly used for the regular line transfers: Monaco-Nice and Nice-Monaco.

== Fleet ==
Monacair’s fleet comprises single- and twin-engine helicopters (2012 to 2016), which are partly owned by the airline itself and partly belong to private owners who use Monacair for its management capabilities.

Among which :

- AgustaWestland AW109SP
- Eurocopter AS365 DauphinN3
- Airbus Helicopters EC 155 B1
- Eurocopter EC130
- AgustaWestland AW 139
- Airbus Helicopters EC 135
- Airbus Helicopters H 175
- Airbus Helicopters AS 350 B2+
- Airbus Helicopters AS 350 B2

== See also ==
- List of helicopter airlines
