= List of airports in the Prince Rupert area =

Location in British Columbia

The following active airports serve the area around Prince Rupert, British Columbia, Canada:

Airport name	ICAO/TC LID (IATA)	Location	Coordinates
Prince Rupert Airport	CYPR (YPR)	Prince Rupert	54°17′10″N 130°26′41″W
Prince Rupert/Digby Island Water Aerodrome	CAN6	Prince Rupert	54°19′00″N 130°24′00″W
Prince Rupert (Hospital) Heliport	CBR8	Prince Rupert	54°18′19″N 130°19′48″W
Prince Rupert/Seal Cove (Coast Guard) Heliport	CBY5	Prince Rupert	54°19′54″N 130°16′36″W
Prince Rupert/Seal Cove (Public) Heliport	CBF6	Prince Rupert	54°19′47″N 130°16′45″W
Prince Rupert/Seal Cove Water Aerodrome	CZSW (ZSW)	Prince Rupert	54°20′00″N 130°17′00″W

== See also ==
- List of airports in the Gulf Islands
- List of airports in the Lower Mainland
- List of airports in the Okanagan
- List of airports on Vancouver Island
- List of airports in Greater Victoria
