= Masset Airport =

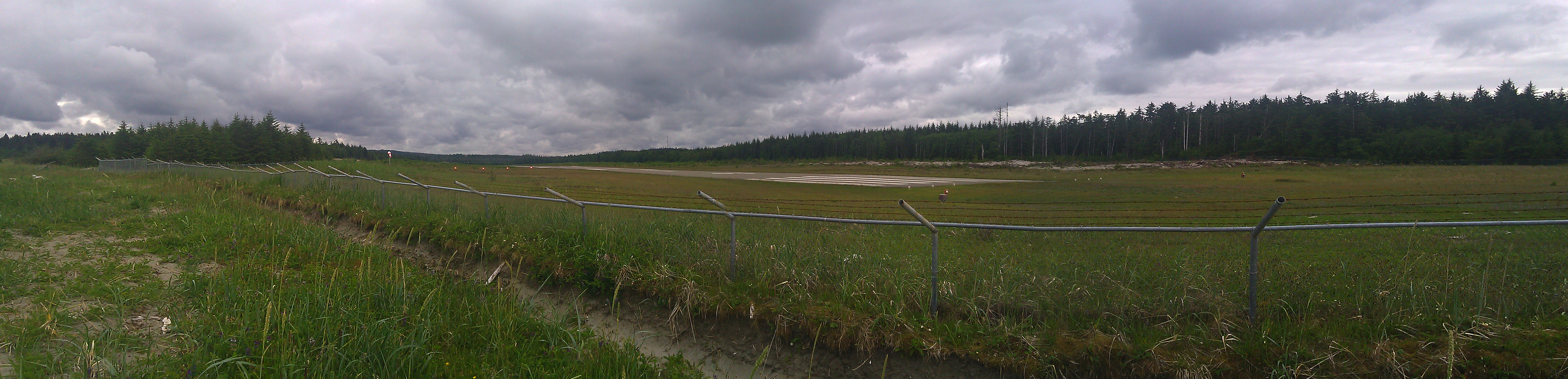
- Masset Airport as seen from the north, near the coast
- IATA: ZMT; ICAO: CZMT

Summary
- Airport type: Public
- Operator: Village of Masset
- Location: Masset, British Columbia
- Time zone: MST (UTC−07:00)
- Elevation AMSL: 19 ft / 6 m
- Coordinates: 54°01′38″N 132°07′30″W

Map
- Location in British Columbia

Runways
Direction	Length		Surface
Direction	ft	m	Surface
13/31	4,924	1,501	Asphalt

Helipads
Number	Length		Surface
Number	ft	m	Surface
Pad 1	69 × 69	226 × 226	Concrete
Pad 2	69 × 69	226 × 226	Concrete
- Sources: Canada Flight Supplement

Masset Airport (IATA: ZMT, ICAO: CZMT) is located 1.5 nautical miles (2.8 km; 1.7 mi) northeast of Masset, British Columbia, Canada. In 2008, the airport began services using a Boeing 737 jet.

== History ==
The airport was constructed in July 1943 as RCAF Station Masset. It was built by the Royal Canadian Air Force's No. 9 Construction Maintenance Unit. The original landing strip was a perforated steel plate runway, which was built in a record breaking 14 days. At the end of World War II, RCAF Station Masset was surplus to requirements, so in 1945 it was mothballed.

CFS Masset, a radio relay station, was built adjacent to RCAF Station Masset in 1942.

== Airlines and destinations ==
Airlines	Destinations
Central Mountain Air	Charter: Vancouver
Pacific Coastal Airlines	Vancouver
Summit Air	Charter: Vancouver

== Incidents and accidents ==
- On 11 January 1995, a Canada Jet Charters Learjet 35 (registration C-GPUN) crashed into the water whilst performing an approach to runway 12. Investigators concluded that the flight likely had its altimeter calibrated to the wrong pressure setting, causing it to descend too low whilst still far from the runway. The aircraft was performing an air ambulance flight from Vancouver to Masset. All five occupants on board the aircraft were killed.

== See also ==
- Masset Water Aerodrome
