= Masset Water Aerodrome =

- IATA: none; ICAO: none; TC LID: CBN4

Summary
- Airport type: Public
- Operator: Village of Masset
- Location: Masset, British Columbia
- Time zone: PST (UTC−08:00)
  - Summer (DST): PDT (UTC−07:00)
- Elevation AMSL: 0 ft / 0 m
- Coordinates: 54°00′26″N 132°08′24″W

Map
- Location in British Columbia CBN4 (Canada)

Runways
Direction	Length		Surface
Direction	ft	m	Surface
n/a	n/a	n/a	Water
- Source: Water Aerodrome Supplement

Masset Water Aerodrome (TC LID: CBN4) is located adjacent to Masset, British Columbia, Canada.

== Airlines and destinations ==
Airlines	Destinations
Inland Air	Prince Rupert

== See also ==
- Masset Airport
