= Helijet =

Canadian airline

Helijet International Inc

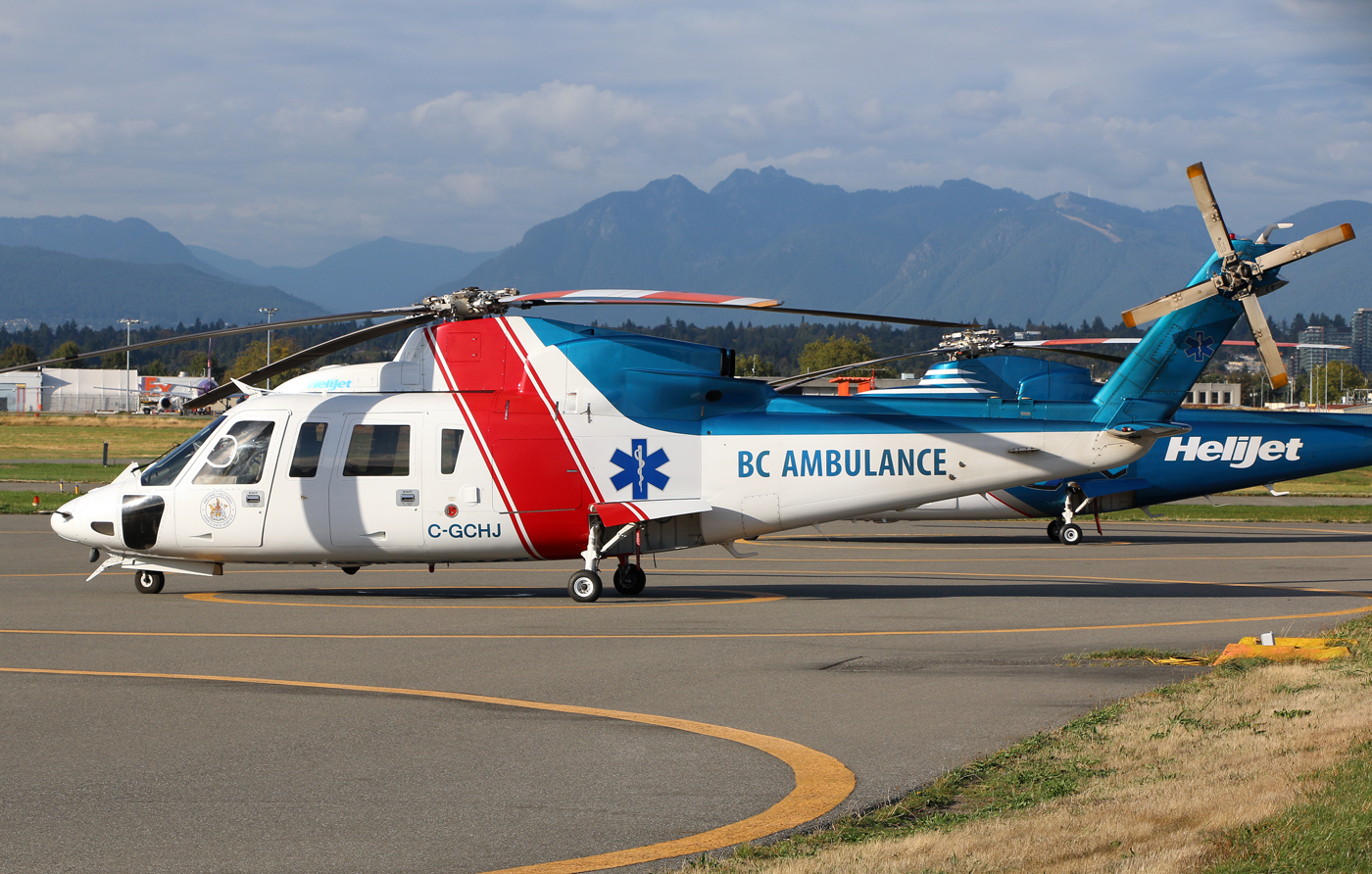
- A Sikorsky S-76 operating as a MEDEVAC aircraft for BC Ambulance
| IATA | ICAO | Call sign |
|---|---|---|
| JB | JBA | HELIJET |
- Founded: 1986; 40 years ago
- AOC #: Canada: 4622; United States: HJ0F756F
- Hubs: Vancouver International Airport
- Fleet size: 18
- Destinations: 3
- Headquarters: Vancouver, British Columbia
- Key people: Alistair Maclennan, Chairman of the Board; Danny Sitnam, President
- Website: www.helijet.com

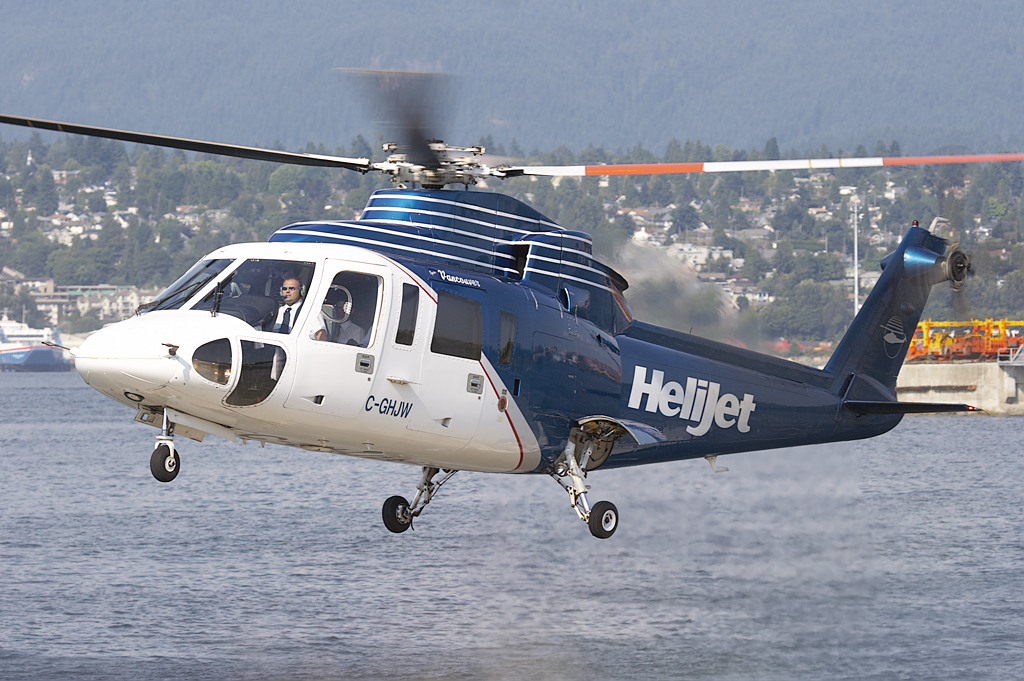
A Helijet S76 comes in for a landing at Vancouver Harbour

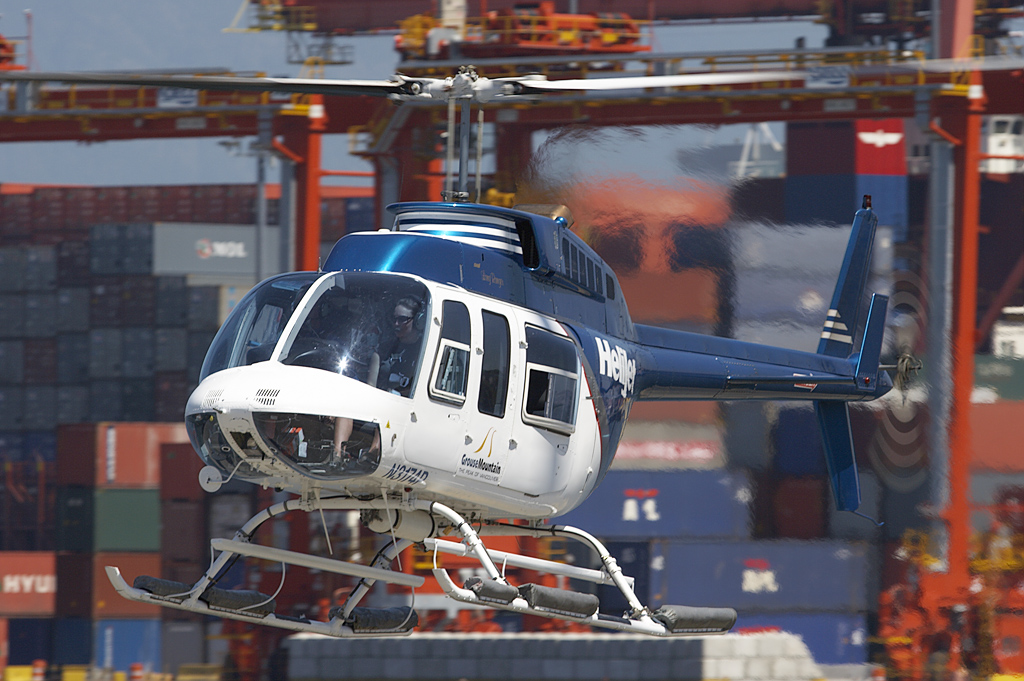
A former Helijet Bell 206L-1 LongRanger landing on the Vancouver Harbour Helipad

Helijet International is a helicopter airline and charter service based in Richmond, British Columbia, Canada. Its scheduled passenger helicopter airline services operates flights from heliports at Vancouver International Airport (YVR), downtown Vancouver, downtown Nanaimo and downtown Victoria. It also operates a charter division (Helijet Charters) serving the film, television, aerial tour, industrial and general helicopter and corporate jet charter markets, as well as helicopter and jet air ambulance services. Its head office and main hangar is Vancouver International Airport (YVR).

Sightseeing harbour and city tours and scheduled services to Victoria and Nanaimo operate from the Vancouver Harbour Heliport located on the shores of Burrard Inlet, adjacent to Waterfront Station. The actual heliport is a floating structure located in the harbour waters. Helijet is also British Columbia's largest air medical service provider, operating rotary wing, fixed wing medevac aircraft including Learjet.

== History ==
The airline was established in 1986 as Helijet Airways and started operations between Vancouver and Victoria in November 1986 with one Bell 412 helicopter and 14 staff members. During the past 30 years of operation, Helijet has grown from one aircraft in scheduled service with 14 personnel carrying just 22,000 passengers, into a diversified company with 15 aircraft and 150+ employees carrying over 100,000 passengers per year. With US Helicopter being defunct in the New York City area since 2009, Helijet and BLADE Urban Air Mobility Inc. are the only scheduled passenger helicopter airline service in North America.

In the past, Helijet provided scheduled passenger services with Sikorsky S-76 helicopters or Beechcraft 1900 turboprop fixed-wing aircraft to Seattle-Boeing Field, Abbotsford International Airport, Langley Regional Airport, Victoria International Airport and Campbell River Airport, all of which are still destinations accessible by Helijet Charters' services. Helijet has operated large, 19 passenger seat Sikorsky S-61 helicopters as well including in scheduled service between Vancouver and Victoria.

All scheduled passenger services between the company's heliports located in downtown Vancouver, B.C. and downtown Victoria, B.C. have been operated for many years with twin engine, Instrument Flight Rules (IFR) capable Sikorsky S-76 helicopters flown by two pilots. During the 2013 summer season, all scheduled service between Vancouver and Victoria was being operated with Bell 206L-3 LongRanger III turbine powered rotorcraft. However, with the advent of the 2013 fall season, Helijet was once again operating Sikorsky S-76 helicopters between Vancouver and Victoria and is currently doing so.

Helijet International operates the Vancouver and Victoria Harbour Heliports under its wholly owned subsidiary, Pacific Heliport Services.

== Destinations ==
As of August 2019, Helijet operates scheduled services to the following destinations:

- Nanaimo (Nanaimo Harbour Heliport)
- Vancouver (Vancouver Harbour Heliport)
- Victoria (Victoria Harbour (Camel Point) Heliport at Ogden Point)

Helijet operates air ambulance at the following heliports/airports in British Columbia, Canada:

- Prince Rupert/Seal Cove, in Prince Rupert, British Columbia
- Vancouver International Airport (YVR) - home base and corporate headquarters

Helijet also operates a year-round base at Sandspit Airport and provides helicopter services between Masset Airport and numerous fishing lodges in the Haida Gwaii area during the BC fishing season. The fishing lodges have an operating helipad to facilitate this service, which includes passenger and cargo transfers.

On March 11, 2015, Helijet began operating new scheduled passenger service utilizing Sikorsky S-76 helicopters with seven roundtrip flights every weekday between the company's downtown heliport located in Vancouver Harbour and the Nanaimo Harbour Heliport located at the Nanaimo Cruise Ship Welcome Centre.

== Fleet ==
=== Current ===
As of 15 January 2026, the Helijet fleet consists of the following aircraft types:

Helijet fleet
| Aircraft | No. of aircraft | Variants | Notes |
|---|---|---|---|
| Aérospatiale AS350 | 2 | AS350 B2 & B3 | 5 passengers, MEDEVAC capable |
| Learjet 31 | 1 | 31A | Fixed wing |
| Cessna Citation X | 1 | 750 | Fixed wing |
| Sikorsky S-76 | 14 | 4 - S-76A; 1 - S-76B; 9 - S-76C | 12 passengers |
| Total | 18 | | |

=== Former ===
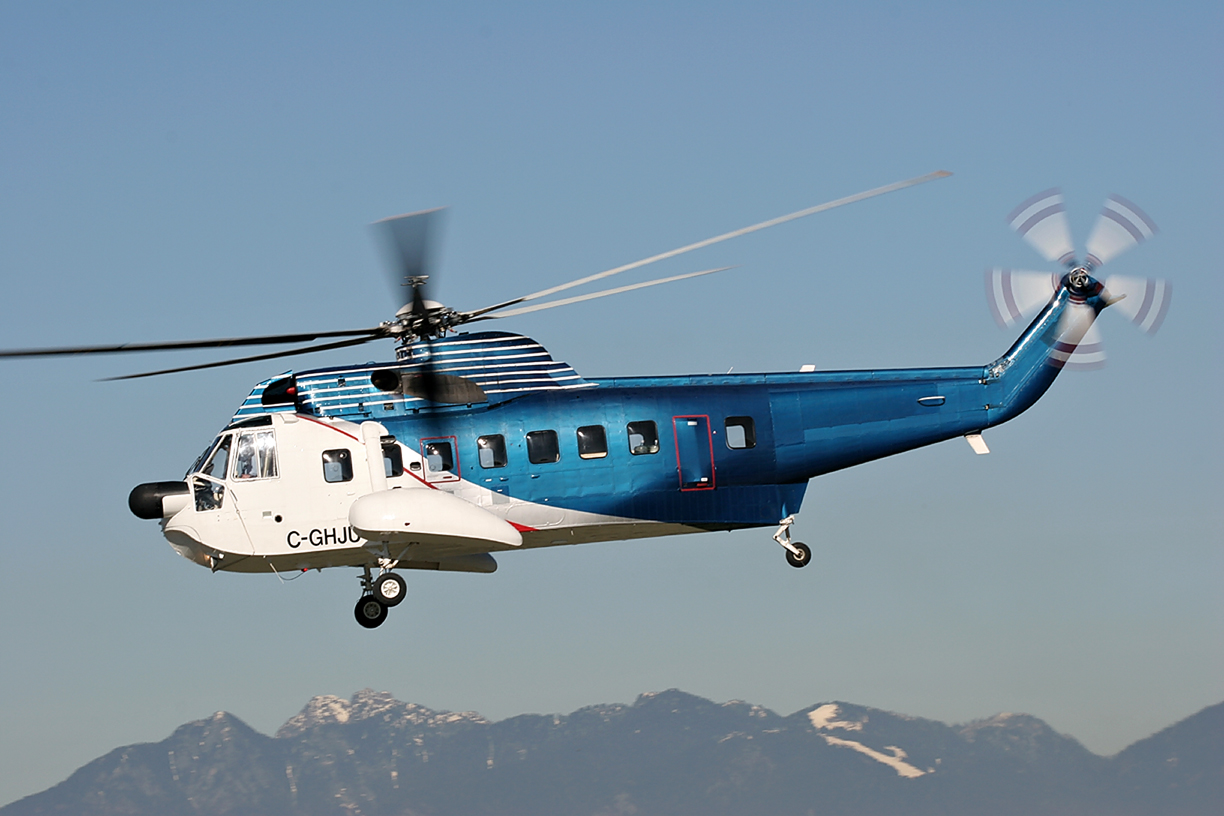
HeliJet's S61N (C-GHJU) at Vancouver International Airport

HeliJet has operated the following fixed wing turboprop and helicopter types:

- Aérospatiale Eurocopter AS355 Écureuil 2 (AS355 F1)
- Beechcraft 1900 (1900D)
- Beechcraft Super King Air
- Sikorsky S-61 (S-61N)
