= Monaco Heliport =

Airport in comune of Monaco, Monaco

Monaco Heliport Héliport de Monaco
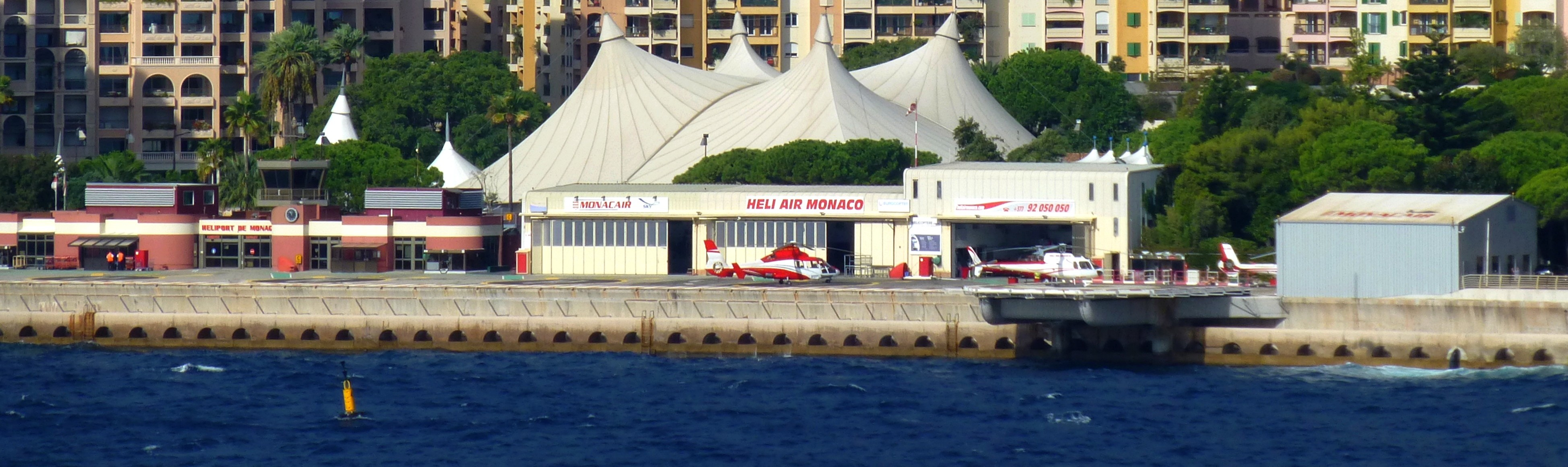
- IATA: MCM; ICAO: LNMC

Summary
- Airport type: Public
- Operator: Direction de l'Aviation Civile
- Serves: Monaco
- Hub for: Monacair
- Elevation AMSL: 20 ft (6.1 m)
- Coordinates: 43°43′35″N 007°25′14″E

Map
- Location on a map of Monaco

Monaco Heliport (French: Héliport de Monaco, ICAO: LNMC), also known as Monte Carlo Heliport, is a heliport situated in the district of Fontvieille in the Principality of Monaco. The heliport is the only aviation facility within Monaco. It was opened with the support of Prince Rainier III in 1976, with only one helipad, later expanded. The only scheduled destination is Nice Côte d'Azur Airport in Nice, France. Both arrivals and departures are routed over the water, to minimize noise.

== Location ==
The heliport is located directly on the Mediterranean coastline in the vicinity of the Stade Louis II.

== Facilities ==
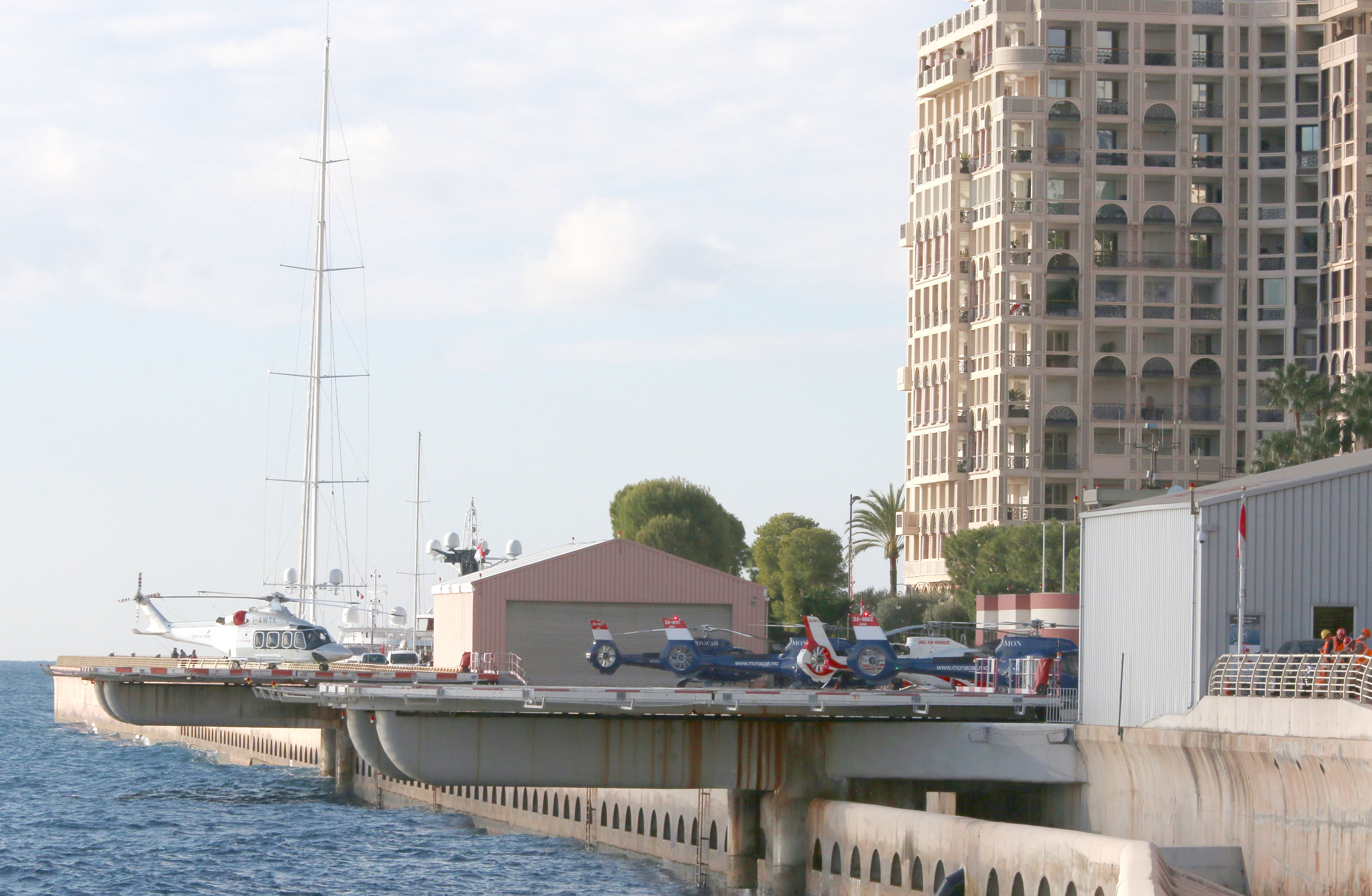

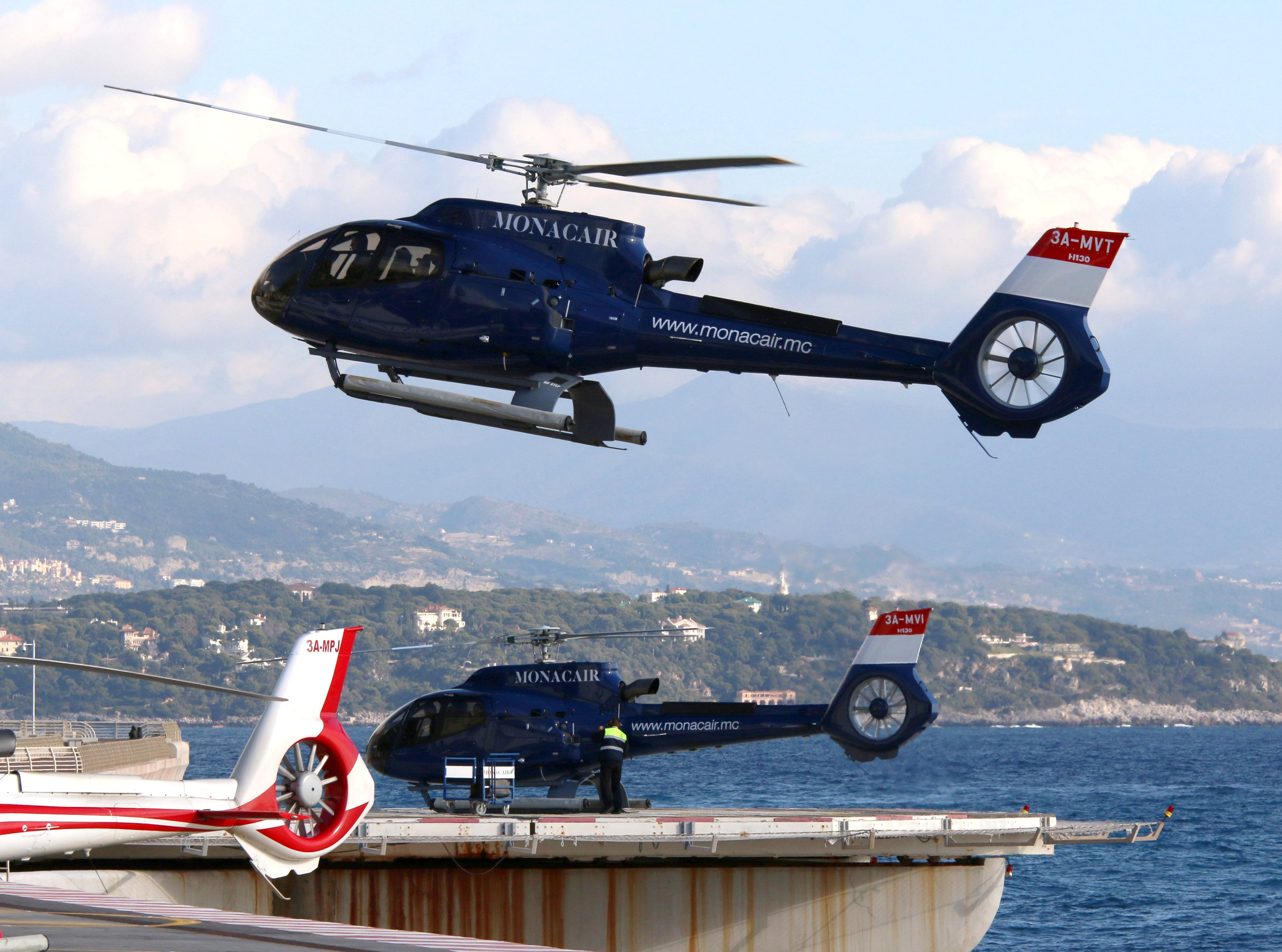
Monacair H130 takes off, 2018

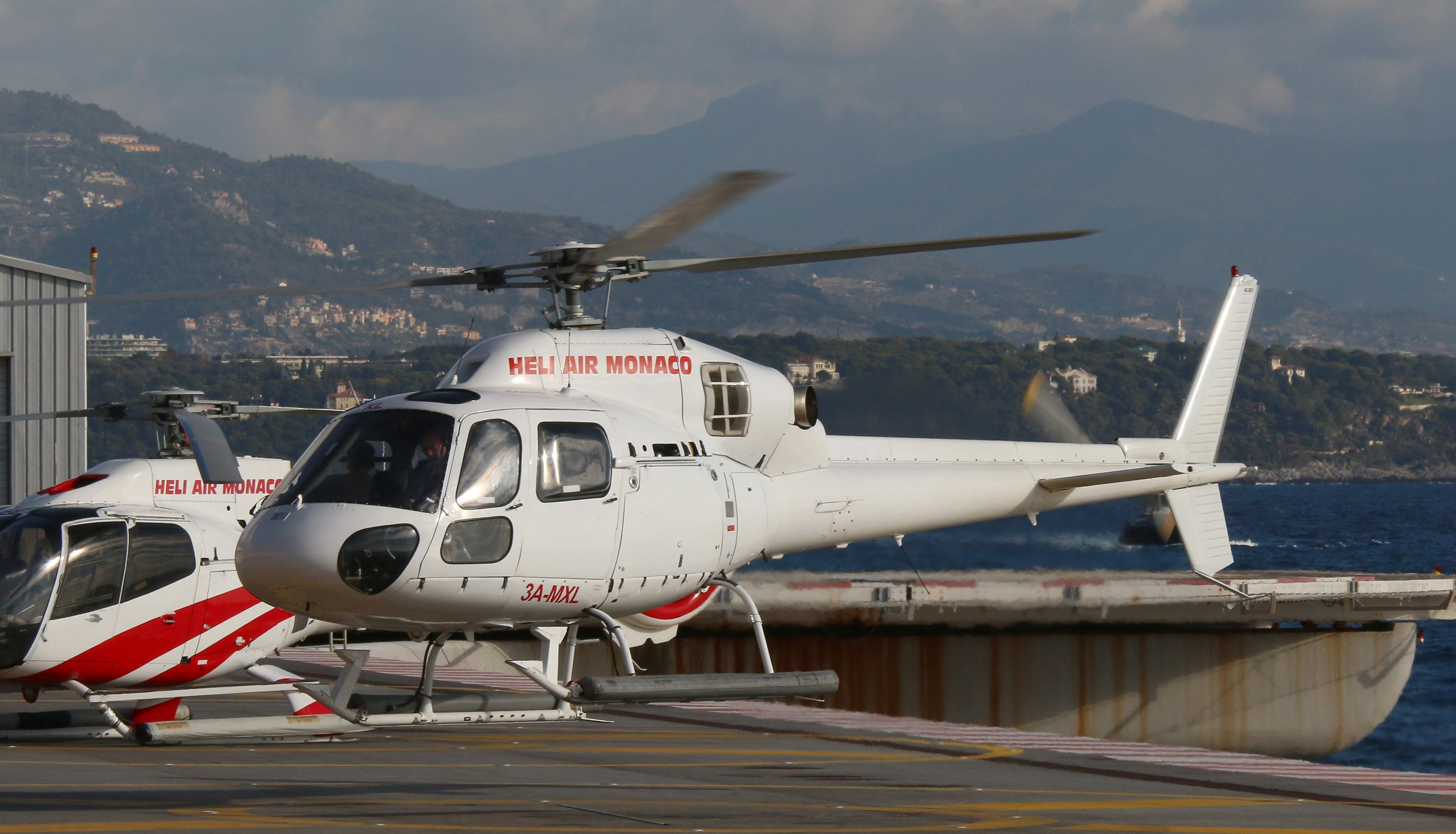
Heli Air Monaco AS355N, 2018

The heliport has been expanded to eight pads since its opening in 1987, with pads A and B jutted out over the sea. There is a single terminal structure at the heliport, and four hangar facilities, three on the east and one on the west side of the heliport. There is also an underground parking lot, and a drop-off area at the front of the terminal.

The heliport is managed by the Direction de l'Aviation Civile and Security is provided the Division de Police Maritime et Aéroportuaire, a subdivision of the Direction de la Sûreté Publique.

== Airlines and destinations ==
Airlines offering scheduled flights to Nice Côte d'Azur Airport are Blade, Monacair, Heli Air Monaco, Heli Securite, and Alpes Hélicoptères. Many passengers arrive at Nice Airport by airplane and connect via helicopter as this is the fastest and most costly option to get to Monaco from further away.

Airlines	Destinations
Blade	Nice
Monacair	Nice
Heli Securite	Nice
Heli Air Monaco	Nice
Alpes hélicoptères	Various

== Ground transportation ==
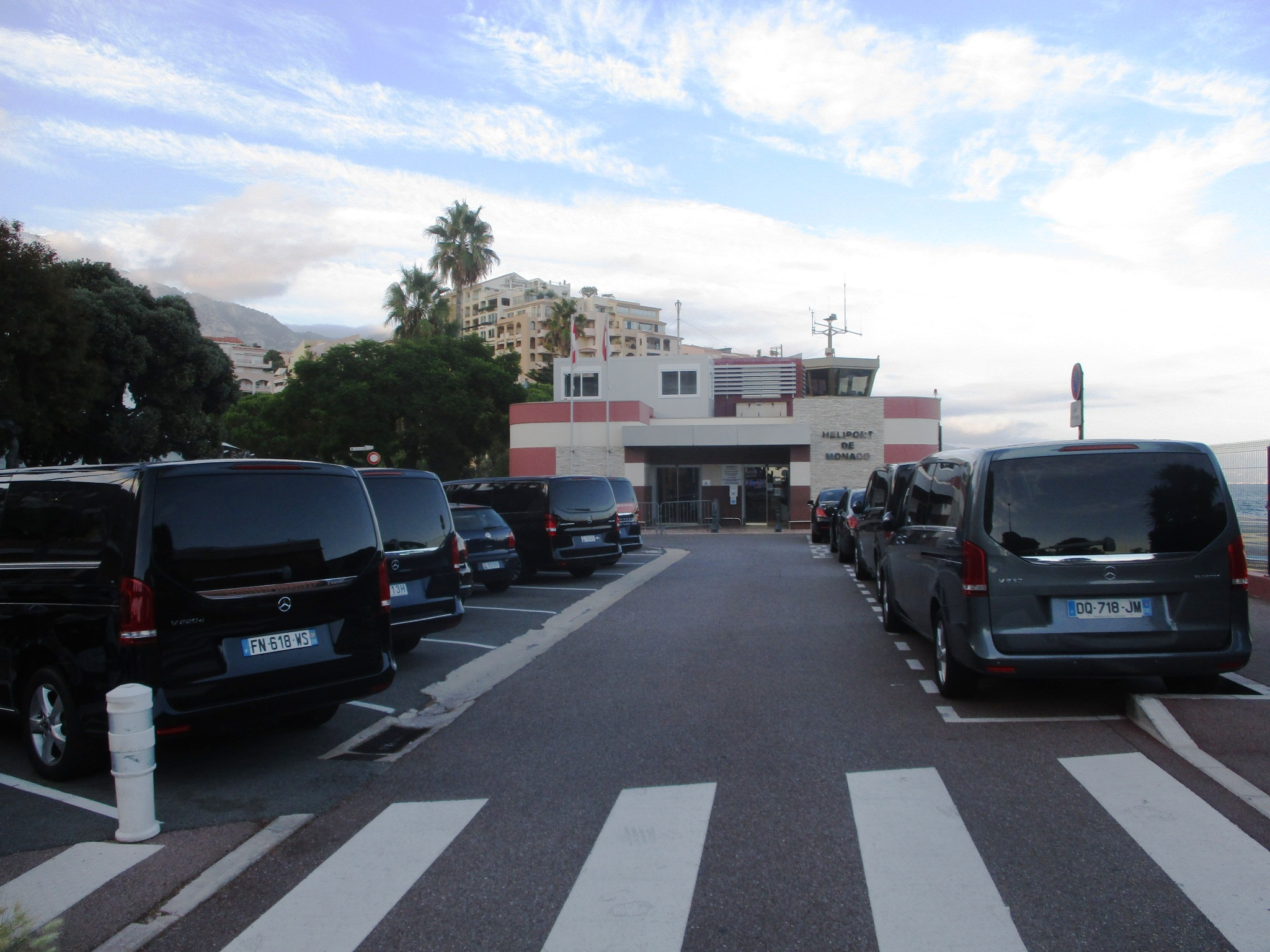
Heliport terminal and parking

Shuttle buses provide connections to and from the heliport with major hotels and many other locations within Monaco. Compagnie des Autobus de Monaco operates two bus routes, which stop in the vicinity of the heliport.
