= List of the busiest airports in Canada =

The following is a list of the busiest airports in Canada. The airports are ranked by passenger traffic and aircraft movements. For each airport, the lists cite the city served by the airport as designated by Transport Canada, not necessarily the municipality where the airport is physically located.

Since 2010, Toronto–Pearson and Vancouver International Airport have been the two busiest airports by both passengers served and aircraft movements. Toronto-Pearson is located within the Golden Horseshoe, the most populous metropolitan region of Canada. Due to its position on the coast of British Columbia, Vancouver International has long served as Canada's hub for flights bound for Asia and Oceania.

As one of the closest major North American cities to Europe, Montréal-Trudeau has also seen substantial passenger growth in recent years, now serving over 22 million passengers annually, with nearly 16 million on international flights, making it one of North America's busiest international hubs, in Canada second only to Toronto-Pearson.

Calgary International is the busiest airport in Alberta and the fourth-busiest in Canada by passenger traffic, as the region's petroleum and tourism industries and its proximity to Banff National Park have helped foster growth, and offers nonstop flights to an array of destinations in North and Central America, Europe, and Asia.

== 2025 ==
=== Canada's busiest airports by passenger traffic ===
Rank	Rank change	Airport	Serves	Province	Total passengers	Annual change
1	Steady	Toronto Pearson International Airport	Greater Toronto Area	Ontario	47,300,000	1.1% ▲
2	Steady	Vancouver International Airport	Metro Vancouver	British Columbia	26,913,561	2.7% ▲
3	Steady	Montréal–Trudeau International Airport	Greater Montreal	Québec	22,364,685	0.5% ▼
4	Steady	Calgary International Airport	Calgary Metropolitan Region	Alberta	19,409,550	2.7% ▲
5	Steady	Edmonton International Airport	Edmonton Metropolitan Region	Alberta	8,140,815	2.8% ▲
6	Steady	Ottawa Macdonald–Cartier International Airport	National Capital Region	Ontario	4,866,236	5.6% ▲
7	Steady	Winnipeg Richardson International Airport	Winnipeg Capital Region	Manitoba	4,412,013	2.7% ▲
8	Steady	Halifax Stanfield International Airport	Halifax	Nova Scotia	4,140,484	4.0% ▲
9	Steady	Kelowna International Airport	Kelowna/Okanagan Valley	British Columbia	2,315,432	8.5% ▲
10	▲1	Victoria International Airport	Greater Victoria	British Columbia	1,986,057	6.1% ▲
11	▲1	Québec City Jean Lesage International Airport	Quebec City Metropolitan Region	Québec	1,819,553	4.7% ▲
12	▼2	Billy Bishop Toronto City Airport	Toronto	Ontario	1,700,000	15% ▼
13	Steady	Saskatoon John G. Diefenbaker International Airport	Saskatoon Metropolitan Area	Saskatchewan	1,516,840	3.2% ▲
14	Steady	St. John's International Airport	St. John's Metropolitan Area	Newfoundland and Labrador	1,410,000	2.2% ▲
15	Steady	Regina International Airport	Regina	Saskatchewan	1,116,427	3.1% ▲
16	Steady	Abbotsford International Airport	Abbotsford/Fraser Valley	British Columbia	1,025,655	2.5% ▲
17	Steady	Thunder Bay International Airport	Thunder Bay	Ontario	777,284	6.8% ▲
18	Steady	Greater Moncton Roméo LeBlanc International Airport	Greater Moncton	New Brunswick	656,246	0.8% ▼
19	Steady	Yellowknife Airport	Yellowknife	Northwest Territories	618,117	2.3% ▲
20	▲3	Comox Valley Airport	Comox Valley	British Columbia	449,849	11.7% ▲
21	Steady	Prince George Airport	Prince George	British Columbia	443,366	1.6% ▼
22	▼2	Region of Waterloo International Airport	Waterloo Region	Ontario	426,500	18.5% ▼
23	▲1	Fredericton International Airport	Fredericton	New Brunswick	393,687	4.4% ▲
24	▼2	Charlottetown Airport	Charlottetown	Prince Edward Island	391,086	4.8% ▼
25	Steady	Fort McMurray International Airport	Wood Buffalo	Alberta	339,615	3.9% ▼
26	Steady	John C. Munro Hamilton International Airport	Greater Toronto and Hamilton Area	Ontario	329,595	1.6% ▲
27	Steady	London International Airport	London	Ontario	297,822	5.3% ▼

== 2024 ==
=== Canada's busiest airports by passenger traffic ===
Rank	Rank change	Airport	Serves	Province	Total passengers	Annual change
1	Steady	Toronto Pearson International Airport	Greater Toronto Area	Ontario	46,800,000	4.4% ▲
2	Steady	Vancouver International Airport	Metro Vancouver	British Columbia	26,205,801	5.1% ▲
3	Steady	Montréal–Trudeau International Airport	Greater Montreal	Québec	22,406,972	5.8% ▲
4	Steady	Calgary International Airport	Calgary Metropolitan Region	Alberta	18,895,684	2.2% ▲
5	Steady	Edmonton International Airport	Edmonton Metropolitan Region	Alberta	7,919,690	5.6% ▲
6	Steady	Ottawa Macdonald–Cartier International Airport	National Capital Region	Ontario	4,606,824	12.5% ▲
7	Steady	Winnipeg Richardson International Airport	Winnipeg Capital Region	Manitoba	4,297,478	4.9% ▲
8	Steady	Halifax Stanfield International Airport	Halifax	Nova Scotia	3,979,785	11.2% ▲
9	▲1	Kelowna International Airport	Kelowna/Okanagan Valley	British Columbia	2,133,582	5.0% ▲
10	▼1	Billy Bishop Toronto City Airport	Toronto	Ontario	2,000,000+	▲
11	Steady	Victoria International Airport	Greater Victoria	British Columbia	1,872,033	7.4% ▲
12	Steady	Québec City Jean Lesage International Airport	Quebec City Metropolitan Region	Québec	1,737,803	2.9% ▲
13	Steady	Saskatoon John G. Diefenbaker International Airport	Saskatoon Metropolitan Area	Saskatchewan	1,469,224	15.0% ▲
14	▲1	St. John's International Airport	St. John's Metropolitan Area	Newfoundland and Labrador	1,380,000	9.5%▲
15	▲1	Regina International Airport	Regina	Saskatchewan	1,082,450	10.2% ▲
16	▼2	Abbotsford International Airport	Abbotsford/Fraser Valley	British Columbia	1,000,839	24.1% ▼
17	▲1	Thunder Bay International Airport	Thunder Bay	Ontario	728,000	2.0%▲
18	▲1	Greater Moncton Roméo LeBlanc International Airport	Greater Moncton	New Brunswick	661,629	10.2% ▲
19	▲1	Yellowknife Airport	Yellowknife	Northwest Territories	604,330	18.0% ▲
20	▲1	Region of Waterloo International Airport	Waterloo Region	Ontario	523,210	17.5% ▲
21	▲1	Prince George Airport	Prince George	British Columbia	450,494	7.8% ▲
22	▲1	Charlottetown Airport	Charlottetown	Prince Edward Island	410,773	2.0% ▲
23	▲1	Comox Valley Airport	Comox Valley	British Columbia	402,757	8.3% ▲
24	▲3	Fredericton International Airport	Fredericton	New Brunswick	377,346	13.0% ▲
25	▲1	Fort McMurray International Airport	Wood Buffalo	Alberta	353,292	4.1% ▼
26	▼9	John C. Munro Hamilton International Airport	Greater Toronto and Hamilton Area	Ontario	324,336	60% ▼
27	▲1	London International Airport	London	Ontario	314,441	5.7%▼

== 2023 ==
=== Canada's busiest airports by passenger traffic ===
Rank	Rank change	Airport	Serves	Total passengers	Annual change
1	Steady	Toronto Pearson International Airport	Greater Toronto Area	44,800,000	25.8% ▲
2	Steady	Vancouver International Airport	Metro Vancouver	24,938,184	30.9% ▲
3	Steady	Montréal–Trudeau International Airport	Greater Montreal	21,173,941	32.5% ▲
4	Steady	Calgary International Airport	Calgary Metropolitan Region	18,490,283	27.9% ▲
5	Steady	Edmonton International Airport	Edmonton Metropolitan Region	7,499,163	28.2% ▲
6	▲2	Ottawa Macdonald–Cartier International Airport	National Capital Region	4,095,914	36.9% ▲
7	Steady	Winnipeg Richardson International Airport	Winnipeg Capital Region	4,094,793	35.1% ▲
8	▼2	Halifax Stanfield International Airport	Halifax	3,579,293	15.2% ▲
9	Steady	Billy Bishop Toronto City Airport	Toronto	2,036,000	17.5% ▲
10	Steady	Kelowna International Airport	Kelowna/Okanagan Valley	2,032,624	18.3% ▲
11	Steady	Victoria International Airport	Greater Victoria	1,740,107	16.8% ▲
12	Steady	Québec City Jean Lesage International Airport	Quebec City Metropolitan Region	1,688,736	43.8% ▲
13	▲2	Saskatoon John G. Diefenbaker International Airport	Saskatoon Metropolitan Area	1,277,863	34.2% ▲
14	Steady	Abbotsford International Airport	Abbotsford/Fraser Valley	1,275,484	28.5% ▲
15	▼2	St. John's International Airport	St. John's Metropolitan Area	1,260,000	17.4% ▲
16	Steady	Regina International Airport	Regina	981,845	28.5% ▲
17	Steady	John C. Munro Hamilton International Airport	Greater Toronto and Hamilton Area	820,011	27.0% ▲
18	Steady	Thunder Bay International Airport	Thunder Bay	714,070	18.7% ▲
19	Steady	Greater Moncton Roméo LeBlanc International Airport	Greater Moncton	600,121	28.0% ▲
20	Steady	Yellowknife Airport	Yellowknife	511,864	14.6% ▲
21	Steady	Region of Waterloo International Airport	Waterloo Region	445,312	18.4% ▲
22	Steady	Prince George Airport	Prince George	417,848	14.6% ▲
23	Steady	Charlottetown Airport	Charlottetown	402,686	17.9% ▲
24	Steady	Nanaimo Airport	Nanaimo	377,454	11.7%▲
25	Steady	Comox Valley Airport	Comox	371,989	15.0% ▲
26	▼1	Fort McMurray International Airport	Wood Buffalo	367,627	14.8% ▲
27	▲	Fredericton International Airport	Fredericton	333,813	25% ▲
28	▼2	London International Airport	London	332,447	31% ▲

=== Canada's busiest airports by aircraft movements (List only includes airports with Nav Canada control towers) ===
Rank	Airport	Serves	Aircraft movements	Rank change	Annual change
1	Toronto Pearson International Airport	Greater Toronto Area	380,583	Steady	12.4% ▲
2	Vancouver International Airport	Metro Vancouver	281,911	Steady	7.9% ▲
3	Boundary Bay Airport	Greater Vancouver	215,263	Steady	6.9% ▲
4	Calgary International Airport	Calgary	202,497	Steady	6.5% ▲
5	Montréal–Trudeau International Airport	Greater Montreal	201,141	Steady	12.0% ▲
6	Abbotsford International Airport	Abbotsford	182,214	Steady	4.3% ▲
7	Pitt Meadows Airport	Pitt Meadows	149,997	3 ▲	17.8% ▲
8	Region of Waterloo International Airport	Regional Municipality of Waterloo	140,984	1 ▼	4.1% ▲
9	St. Andrews Airport	Winnipeg	132,107	2 ▲	7.5% ▲
10	Calgary/Springbank Airport	Calgary	130,422	1 ▼	1.0% ▲
11	Québec City Jean Lesage International Airport	Quebec City	117,680	3 ▼	12.4% ▼
12	Montréal/Saint-Hubert Airport	Greater Montreal	116,721	Steady	0.7% ▼
13	Edmonton International Airport	Edmonton Metropolitan Region	108,542	4 ▲	10.2% ▲
14	Victoria International Airport	Victoria	108,028	1 ▲	6.4% ▲
15	Winnipeg Richardson International Airport	Winnipeg	107,692	1 ▼	5.4% ▲
16	Thunder Bay International Airport	Thunder Bay	107,594	2 ▲	21.5% ▲
17	London International Airport	London	102,122	3 ▲	17.2% ▲
18	Billy Bishop Toronto City Airport	Toronto	99,773	5 ▼	10.5% ▼
19	Oshawa Executive Airport	Oshawa	95,514	3 ▲	19.8% ▲
20	Greater Moncton Roméo LeBlanc International Airport	Moncton	95,138	1 ▼	8.6% ▲
21	Ottawa Macdonald–Cartier International Airport	Ottawa	93,374	5 ▼	7.1% ▼
22	Saskatoon John G. Diefenbaker International Airport	Saskatoon	87,829	2 ▲	11.3% ▲
23	Kelowna International Airport	Kelowna	84,617	2 ▼	1.4% ▲
24	Chicoutimi/Saint-Honoré Aerodrome	Saint-Honoré	73,412	1 ▼	7.4% ▼
25	Edmonton/Villeneuve Airport	Edmonton	61,656	1 ▲	2.3% ▲
26	Langley Regional Airport	Langley Township	60,486	1 ▲	10.0% ▲
27	Sault Ste. Marie Airport	Sault Ste. Marie	57,938	1 ▲	10.0% ▲
28	Vancouver Harbour Flight Centre	Metro Vancouver	57,806	2 ▲	18.3% ▲
29	Fredericton International Airport	Fredericton	54,455	4 ▼	17.6% ▼
30	Yellowknife Airport	Yellowknife	53,519	Steady	8.9% ▲
31	Halifax Stanfield International Airport	Halifax	52,318	2 ▼	0.5% ▲
32	Regina International Airport	Regina	51,753	1 ▲	15.5% ▲
33	Saint-Jean Airport	Saint-Jean-sur-Richelieu	48,180	6 ▲	36.4% ▲
34	Windsor International Airport	Windsor	47,041	2 ▼	3.1% ▲
35	Prince George Airport	Prince George	45,834	1 ▲	8.5% ▲
36	Fort McMurray International Airport	Fort McMurray	43,465	1 ▼	2.8% ▲
37	Montréal–Mirabel International Airport	Greater Montreal	40,480	3 ▼	5.0% ▼
38	Erik Nielsen Whitehorse International Airport	Whitehorse	37,836	Steady	4.1% ▲
39	John C. Munro Hamilton International Airport	Hamilton	36,419	2 ▼	4.6% ▼
40	Red Deer Regional Airport	Red Deer	32,983	Steady	5.1% ▼
41	St. John's International Airport	St. John's	31,701	Steady	5.3% ▼
42	Gander International Airport	Gander	29,573	Steady	11.0% ▼

== 2022 ==
=== Canada's busiest airports by passenger traffic ===
Rank	Rank change	Airport	Serves	Total passengers	Annual change
1	Steady	Toronto Pearson International Airport	Greater Toronto Area	35,600,000	180.8% ▲
2	Steady	Vancouver International Airport	Metro Vancouver	19,013,416	168.3% ▲
3	▲1	Montréal–Trudeau International Airport	Greater Montreal	15,973,242	207.1% ▲
4	▼1	Calgary International Airport	Calgary Metropolitan Region	14,452,059	128.4% ▲
5	Steady	Edmonton International Airport	Edmonton Metropolitan Region	5,849,674	109.4% ▲
6	▲2	Halifax Stanfield International Airport	Halifax	3,107,425	188.7% ▲
7	▼1	Winnipeg Richardson International Airport	Winnipeg Capital Region	3,031,113	147.8% ▲
8	▼1	Ottawa Macdonald–Cartier International Airport	National Capital Region	2,992,334	155.6% ▲
9	▲8	Billy Bishop Toronto City Airport	Toronto	1,732,000	514% ▲
10	▼1	Kelowna International Airport	Kelowna/Okanagan Valley	1,718,059	107.0% ▲
11	▼1	Victoria International Airport	Greater Victoria	1,490,039	121.2% ▲
12	▲3	Québec City Jean Lesage International Airport	Quebec City	1,174,321	232.5% ▲
13	▼1	St. John's International Airport	St. John's	1,099,392	130% ▲
14	▼3	Abbotsford International Airport	Abbotsford/Fraser Valley	992,712	97.0% ▲
15	▼2	Saskatoon John G. Diefenbaker International Airport	Saskatoon	952,051	116.2% ▲
16	▼2	Regina International Airport	Regina	764,128	115.0% ▲
17	▲1	John C. Munro Hamilton International Airport	Hamilton	645,789	158.3% ▲
18	▼2	Thunder Bay International Airport	Thunder Bay	581,095	83.9% ▲
19	▲2	Greater Moncton Roméo LeBlanc International Airport	Greater Moncton	468,821	164.8% ▲
20	▲2	Region of Waterloo International Airport	Waterloo Region	375,397	118.5% ▲
21	▼1	Prince George Airport	Prince George	364,663	81% ▲
22	▲1	Charlottetown Airport	Charlottetown	341,649	207.3% ▲
23	▼2	Nanaimo Airport	Nanaimo	338,016	74.8%▲
24	▼5	Fort McMurray International Airport	Fort McMurray	320,319	40.1% ▲
25	▼2	London International Airport	London	229,241	126.2% ▲

=== Canada's busiest airports by aircraft movements (List only includes airports with Nav Canada control towers) ===
Rank	Airport	Serves	Aircraft movements	Rank change	Annual change
1	Toronto Pearson International Airport	Greater Toronto Area	338,577	1 ▲	
2	Vancouver International Airport	Metro Vancouver	261,331	2 ▲	
3	Boundary Bay Airport	Greater Vancouver	201,413	2 ▼	
4	Calgary International Airport	Calgary	190,091	5 ▲	
5	Montréal–Trudeau International Airport	Greater Montreal	179,601	8 ▲	
6	Abbotsford International Airport	Abbotsford	174,748	3 ▼	
7	Region of Waterloo International Airport	Regional Municipality of Waterloo	135,454	1 ▼	
8	Québec City Jean Lesage International Airport	Quebec City	134,400	1 ▼	
9	Calgary/Springbank Airport	Calgary	129,172	4 ▼	
10	Pitt Meadows Airport	Pitt Meadows	127,284	2 ▼	
11	St. Andrews Airport	Winnipeg	122,878	Steady	
12	Montréal/Saint-Hubert Airport	Greater Montreal	117,586	2 ▼	
13	Billy Bishop Toronto City Airport	Toronto	111,538	8 ▲	
14	Winnipeg Richardson International Airport	Winnipeg	102,212	2 ▲	
15	Victoria International Airport	Victoria	101,507	1 ▼	
16	Ottawa Macdonald–Cartier International Airport	Ottawa	100,555	12 ▲	
17	Edmonton International Airport	Edmonton Metropolitan Region	98,458	5 ▲	
18	Thunder Bay International Airport	Thunder Bay	88,524	5 ▲	
19	Greater Moncton Roméo LeBlanc International Airport	Moncton	87,570	5 ▲	
20	London International Airport	London	87,106	4 ▲	
21	Kelowna International Airport	Kelowna	83,377	1 ▼	
22	Oshawa Executive Airport	Oshawa	79,695	7 ▼	
23	Chicoutimi/Saint-Honoré Aerodrome	Saint-Honoré	79,254	11 ▼	
24	Saskatoon John G. Diefenbaker International Airport	Saskatoon	78,913	7 ▼	
25	Fredericton International Airport	Fredericton	66,119	4 ▲	
26	Edmonton/Villeneuve Airport	Edmonton	60,260	2 ▲	
27	Langley Regional Airport	Langley Township	54,968	4 ▼	
28	Sault Ste. Marie Airport	Sault Ste. Marie	52,671	3 ▼	
29	Halifax Stanfield International Airport	Halifax	52,063	2 ▲	
30	Yellowknife Airport	Yellowknife	49,152		
31	Vancouver Harbour Flight Centre	Metro Vancouver	48,847		
32	Windsor International Airport	Windsor	45,621		
33	Regina International Airport	Regina	44,791		
34	Montréal–Mirabel International Airport	Greater Montreal	42,604		
35	Fort McMurray International Airport	Fort McMurray	42,282		
36	Prince George Airport	Prince George	42,226		
37	John C. Munro Hamilton International Airport	Hamilton	38,185		
38	Erik Nielsen Whitehorse International Airport	Whitehorse	36,356		
39	Saint-Jean Airport	Saint-Jean-sur-Richelieu	35,313		
40	Red Deer Regional Airport	Red Deer	34,769		
41	St. John's International Airport	St. John's	33,468		
42	Gander International Airport	Gander	33,215		

== 2021 ==
=== Canada's busiest airports by passenger traffic ===
Rank	Rank change	Airport	Serves	Total passengers	Annual change
1	Steady	Toronto Pearson International Airport	Greater Toronto Area	12,700,000	4.5% ▼
2	Steady	Vancouver International Airport	Metro Vancouver	7,086,602	3.0% ▼
3	Steady	Calgary International Airport	Calgary Region	6,326,406	11.5% ▲
4	Steady	Montréal–Trudeau International Airport	Greater Montreal	5,201,751	4.3% ▼
5	Steady	Edmonton International Airport	Edmonton Metropolitan Region	2,793,581	6.3% ▲
6	▲1	Winnipeg Richardson International Airport	Winnipeg Capital Region	1,223,054	5.9% ▼
7	▼1	Ottawa Macdonald–Cartier International Airport	National Capital Region	1,170,789	14.1% ▼
8	Steady	Halifax Stanfield International Airport	Halifax	1,076,458	8.1% ▲
9	Steady	Kelowna International Airport	Kelowna/Okanagan Valley	829,804	12.5% ▲
10	Steady	Victoria International Airport	Greater Victoria	673,478	17.2% ▲
11	▲7	Abbotsford International Airport	Abbotsford/Fraser Valley	503,955	59.7% ▲
12	▲3	St. John's International Airport	St. John's	478,124	31% ▲
13	▼1	Saskatoon John G. Diefenbaker International Airport	Saskatoon	439,927	4.8% ▼
14	Steady	Regina International Airport	Regina	355,490	4.0% ▼
15	▼4	Québec City Jean Lesage International Airport	Quebec City	353,203	34% ▼
16	▲2	Thunder Bay International Airport	Thunder Bay	316,025	7.9% ▲
17	▼4	Billy Bishop Toronto City Airport	Toronto	282,000	27.5% ▼
18	▼2	John C. Munro Hamilton International Airport	Hamilton	250,019	24.0% ▼
19	Steady	Fort McMurray International Airport	Fort McMurray	228,627	0.3% ▼
20	▲1	Prince George Airport	Prince George	201,506	13.8% ▲
21	▲1	Nanaimo Airport	Nanaimo	193,425	11.0% ▲
22	Steady	Greater Moncton Roméo LeBlanc International Airport	Greater Moncton	177,040	2.1% ▲
23	▲7	Region of Waterloo International Airport	Waterloo Region	171,828	245% ▲
24	▼2	Charlottetown Airport	Charlottetown	111,160	55.5% ▲
25	▼5	London International Airport	London	101,363	▼

=== Canada's busiest airports by aircraft movements ===
Rank	Airport	Serves	Aircraft movements	Rank change	Annual change
1	Boundary Bay Airport	Greater Vancouver	211,335	Steady	
2	Toronto Pearson International Airport	Greater Toronto Area	174,588	Steady	
3	Abbotsford International Airport	Abbotsford	169,017	1 ▲	
4	Vancouver International Airport	Metro Vancouver	166,935	1 ▼	
5	Calgary/Springbank Airport	Calgary	138,969	Steady	
6	Region of Waterloo International Airport	Regional Municipality of Waterloo	133,293	2 ▲	
7	Québec City Jean Lesage International Airport	Quebec City	129,649	Steady	
8	Pitt Meadows Airport	Pitt Meadows	125,761	1 ▲	
9	Calgary International Airport	Calgary	124,108	3 ▼	
10	Montréal/Saint-Hubert Airport	Greater Montreal	116,628	Steady	
11	St. Andrews Airport	Winnipeg	115,350	Steady	
12	Chicoutimi/Saint-Honoré Aerodrome	Saint-Honoré	107,339	1 ▲	
13	Montréal–Trudeau International Airport	Greater Montreal	98,857	1 ▼	
14	Victoria International Airport	Victoria	98,721	3 ▲	
15	Oshawa Executive Airport	Oshawa	96,678	1 ▲	
16	Winnipeg Richardson International Airport	Winnipeg	85,015	2 ▲	
17	Saskatoon John G. Diefenbaker International Airport	Saskatoon	82,808	5 ▲	
18	Thunder Bay International Airport	Thunder Bay	81,637	3 ▲	
19	London International Airport	London	77,099	7 ▲	
20	Kelowna International Airport	Kelowna	75,581	3 ▲	
21	Billy Bishop Toronto City Airport	Toronto	73,469	1 ▼	
22	Edmonton International Airport	Edmonton Metropolitan Region	71,316	3 ▼	
23	Langley Regional Airport	Langley Township	71,225	1 ▲	
24	Greater Moncton Roméo LeBlanc International Airport	Moncton	69,855	9 ▼	
25	Sault Ste. Marie Airport	Sault Ste. Marie	67,725	5 ▲	
26	Montréal–Mirabel International Airport	Greater Montreal	66,572	1 ▲	
27	Edmonton/Villeneuve Airport	Edmonton	65,450	2 ▼	
28	Ottawa Macdonald–Cartier International Airport	Ottawa	64,797	Steady	
29	Fredericton International Airport	Fredericton	57,697	15 ▼	
30	Regina International Airport	Regina	44,433	1 ▼	
31	Halifax Stanfield International Airport	Halifax	32,315	Steady	
32	Vancouver Harbour Flight Centre	Metro Vancouver	32,204	▲	

== 2020 ==
Air traffic decreased greatly in this year due to the COVID-19 pandemic.

=== Canada's busiest airports by passenger traffic ===
Rank	Rank change	Airport	Serves	Total passengers	Annual change
1	Steady	Toronto Pearson International Airport	Greater Toronto Area	13,307,077	73.6% ▼
2	Steady	Vancouver International Airport	Metro Vancouver	7,300,287	72.3% ▼
3	▲1	Calgary International Airport	Calgary Region	5,675,483	68.4% ▼
4	▼1	Montréal–Trudeau International Airport	Greater Montreal	5,436,998	73.2% ▼
5	Steady	Edmonton International Airport	Edmonton Metropolitan Region	2,628,891	67.7% ▼
6	Steady	Ottawa Macdonald–Cartier International Airport	National Capital Region	1,363,512	73.3% ▼
7	Steady	Winnipeg Richardson International Airport	Winnipeg Capital Region	1,299,225	71.0% ▼
8	Steady	Halifax Stanfield International Airport	Halifax	995,426	76.2% ▼
9	▲1	Kelowna International Airport	Kelowna/Okanagan Valley	737,447	63.7% ▼
10	▲1	Victoria International Airport	Greater Victoria	574,874	70.1% ▼
11	▲1	Québec City Jean Lesage International Airport	Quebec City	535,111	70.1% ▼
12	▲1	Saskatoon John G. Diefenbaker International Airport	Saskatoon	461,900	69.0% ▼
13	▼4	Billy Bishop Toronto City Airport	Toronto	389,000	86.0% ▼
14	▲1	Regina International Airport	Regina	370,364	68.6% ▼
15	▼1	St. John's International Airport	St. John's	364,980	75.4% ▼
16	▲1	John C. Munro Hamilton International Airport	Hamilton	329,193	66.0% ▼
17	▼1	Abbotsford International Airport	Abbotsford/Fraser Valley	315,578	68.7% ▼
18	Steady	Thunder Bay International Airport	Thunder Bay	292,865	64.8% ▼
19	▲2	Fort McMurray International Airport	Fort McMurray	229,314	61.5% ▼
20	▼1	London International Airport	London	202,556	▼
21	▲1	Prince George Airport	Prince George	176,994	64.4% ▼
22	▲	Nanaimo Airport	Nanaimo	174,287	64.5%▼
23	▼3	Greater Moncton Roméo LeBlanc International Airport	Greater Moncton	173,404	74.3% ▼
24	▼3	Charlottetown Airport	Charlottetown	71,480	81.3% ▼

=== Canada's busiest airports by aircraft movements ===
Rank	Airport	Serves	Aircraft movements	Rank change	Annual change
1	Boundary Bay Airport	Greater Vancouver	185,431	4 ▲	
2	Toronto Pearson International Airport	Greater Toronto Area	175,060	1 ▼	
3	Vancouver International Airport	Metro Vancouver	156,640	1 ▼	
4	Abbotsford International Airport	Abbotsford	137,265	2 ▲	
5	Calgary/Springbank Airport	Calgary	128,764	2 ▲	
6	Calgary International Airport	Calgary	119,546	3 ▼	
7	Québec City Jean Lesage International Airport	Quebec City	117,390	2 ▲	
8	Region of Waterloo International Airport	Regional Municipality of Waterloo	107,251	4 ▲	
9	Pitt Meadows Airport	Pitt Meadows	101,443	2 ▲	
10	Montréal/Saint-Hubert Airport	Greater Montreal	100,797	2 ▼	
11	St. Andrews Airport	Winnipeg	99,976	4 ▲	
12	Montréal–Trudeau International Airport	Greater Montreal	97,385	8 ▼	
13	Chicoutimi/Saint-Honoré Aerodrome	Saint-Honoré	89,503	7 ▲	
14	Fredericton International Airport	Fredericton	86,800	3 ▲	
15	Greater Moncton Roméo LeBlanc International Airport	Moncton	85,581	1 ▲	
16	Oshawa Executive Airport	Oshawa	80,483		
17	Victoria International Airport	Victoria	80,121	2 ▲	
18	Winnipeg Richardson International Airport	Winnipeg	77,754	Steady	
19	Edmonton International Airport	Edmonton Metropolitan Region	70,183	4 ▼	
20	Billy Bishop Toronto City Airport	Toronto	69,180	7 ▼	
21	Thunder Bay International Airport	Thunder Bay	68,775		
22	Saskatoon John G. Diefenbaker International Airport	Saskatoon	65,257		
23	Kelowna International Airport	Kelowna	64,093		
24	Langley Regional Airport	Langley Township	61,354		
25	Edmonton/Villeneuve Airport	Edmonton	60,267		
26	London International Airport	London	59,170		
27	Montréal–Mirabel International Airport	Greater Montreal	56,877		
28	Ottawa Macdonald–Cartier International Airport	Ottawa	54,053	18 ▼	
29	Regina International Airport	Regina	39,495		
30	Sault Ste. Marie Airport	Sault Ste. Marie	35,309		
31	Halifax Stanfield International Airport	Halifax	35,207		

== 2019 ==
=== Canada's busiest airports by passenger traffic ===
Rank	Rank change	Airport	Serves	Total passengers	Annual change
1	Steady	Toronto Pearson International Airport	Greater Toronto Area	50,499,431	2.0% ▲
2	Steady	Vancouver International Airport	Metro Vancouver	26,379,870	1.7% ▲
3	Steady	Montréal–Trudeau International Airport	Greater Montreal	20,305,106	4.5% ▲
4	Steady	Calgary International Airport	Calgary Metropolitan Region	17,957,780	3.5% ▲
5	Steady	Edmonton International Airport	Edmonton Metropolitan Region	8,151,532	1.2% ▼
6	Steady	Ottawa Macdonald–Cartier International Airport	National Capital Region	5,106,487	0.1% ▼
7	Steady	Winnipeg Richardson International Airport	Winnipeg Capital Region	4,484,249	0.0%
8	Steady	Halifax Stanfield International Airport	Halifax	4,188,443	3.0% ▼
9	Steady	Billy Bishop Toronto City Airport	Toronto	2,774,000	1.2% ▼
10	Steady	Kelowna International Airport	Kelowna/Okanagan Valley	2,032,144	1.3% ▼
11	Steady	Victoria International Airport	Greater Victoria	1,924,385	6.1% ▼
12	Steady	Québec City Jean Lesage International Airport	Quebec City	1,789,005	0.8% ▲
13	Steady	Saskatoon John G. Diefenbaker International Airport	Saskatoon	1,490,000	1.9% ▼
14	Steady	St. John's International Airport	St. John's	1,483,660	3.9% ▼
15	Steady	Regina International Airport	Regina	1,179,485	4.75% ▼
16	Steady	Abbotsford International Airport	Abbotsford/Fraser Valley	1,008,116	19.7% ▲
17	Steady	John C. Munro Hamilton International Airport	Hamilton	955,373	32% ▲
18	Steady	Thunder Bay International Airport	Thunder Bay	832,570	4.2% ▼
19	▲2	London International Airport	London	683,155	27% ▲
20	▼1	Greater Moncton Roméo LeBlanc International Airport	Greater Moncton	674,406	1.0% ▼

=== Canada's 20 busiest airports by aircraft movements ===
Rank	Airport	Serves	Aircraft movements	Rank change	Annual change
1	Toronto Pearson International Airport	Greater Toronto Area	455,099	Steady	4.35% ▼
2	Vancouver International Airport	Metro Vancouver	332,214	Steady	2.13% ▲
3	Calgary International Airport	Calgary	238,843	Steady	2.13% ▼
4	Montréal–Trudeau International Airport	Greater Montreal	237,801	Steady	1.51% ▼
5	Boundary Bay Airport	Greater Vancouver	216,557	Steady	10.84% ▲
6	Abbotsford International Airport	Abbotsford	164,285	Steady	13.77% ▲
7	Calgary/Springbank Airport	Calgary	153,668	3 ▲	12.20% ▲
8	Montréal/Saint-Hubert Airport	Greater Montreal	145,482	4 ▲	12.68% ▲
9	Québec City Jean Lesage International Airport	Quebec City	144,931	Steady	5.62% ▲
10	Ottawa Macdonald–Cartier International Airport	Ottawa	144,755	2 ▼	3.05% ▼
11	Pitt Meadows Airport	Pitt Meadows	142,523	6 ▲	20.8% ▲
12	Region of Waterloo International Airport	Regional Municipality of Waterloo	140,703	2 ▲	18.7% ▲
13	Billy Bishop Toronto City Airport	Toronto	135,175	2 ▼	0.13% ▲
14	Edmonton International Airport	Edmonton Metropolitan Region	133,769	7 ▼	6.18% ▼
15	St. Andrews Airport	Winnipeg	132,423	1 ▲	12.22% ▲
16	Greater Moncton Roméo LeBlanc International Airport	Moncton	122,308	2 ▲	5.64% ▲
17	Fredericton International Airport	Fredericton	121,437	2 ▲	16.4% ▲
18	Winnipeg Richardson International Airport	Winnipeg	115,892	3 ▼	2.08% ▼
19	Victoria International Airport	Victoria	113,129	6 ▼	8.13% ▼
20	Chicoutimi/Saint-Honoré Aerodrome	Saint-Honoré	94,577	Steady	8.84% ▼

=== Canada's 20 busiest airports by domestic, transborder and international passenger traffic ===
Rank	Airport	Serves	Domestic	% of total	Trans border	% of total	International	% of total
1	Toronto Pearson International Airport	Greater Toronto Area	17,677,504	35.9%	13,624,310	27.7%	17,880,877	36.4%
2	Vancouver International Airport	Metro Vancouver	12,288,884	47.8%	6,296,488	24.5%	7,122,123	27.7%
3	Montréal–Pierre Elliott Trudeau International Airport	Greater Montreal	6,884,671	35.2%	4,441,908	22.7%	8,237,082	42.1%
4	Calgary International Airport	Calgary	11,853,828	68.9%	3,470,496	20.2%	1,872,320	10.9%
5	Edmonton International Airport	Edmonton Capital Region	6,503,827	82.5%	963,762	12.2%	414,132	5.3%
6	Ottawa Macdonald–Cartier International Airport	Ottawa	3,868,035	77.8%	680,688	17.6%	421,167	8.5%
7	Winnipeg Richardson International Airport	Winnipeg	3,608,739	84.4%	479,359	11.2%	185,795	4.4%
8	Halifax Stanfield International Airport	Halifax	3,471,941	84.1%	355,796	8.6%	300,506	7.3%
9	Billy Bishop Toronto City Airport	Toronto	n/a^{D}		n/a^{D}		0	0.0%
10	Kelowna International Airport	Kelowna	1,818,926	92.4%	99,846	5.1%	50,241	2.6%
11	Victoria International Airport	Victoria	1,594,847	86.4%	n/a^{D}		n/a^{D}	
12	Québec City Jean Lesage International Airport	Quebec City	1,164,377	67.6%	217,983	12.7%	339,163	29.1%
13	Saskatoon John G. Diefenbaker International Airport	Saskatoon	1,299,529	88.1%	n/a^{D}		n/a^{D}	
14	St. John's International Airport	St. John's	1,385,675	96.6%	n/a^{D}		n/a^{D}	
15	Regina International Airport	Regina	1,061,654	91.2%	n/a^{D}		n/a^{D}	
16	Thunder Bay International Airport	Thunder Bay	707,042	95.5%	n/a^{D}		n/a^{D}	
17	Abbotsford International Airport	Abbotsford/Fraser Valley	n/a^{D}		n/a^{D}		n/a^{D}	
18	John C. Munro Hamilton International Airport	Hamilton	n/a^{D}		n/a^{D}		n/a^{D}	
19	London International Airport	London	627,960	93.6%	n/a^{D}		n/a^{D}	
20	Greater Moncton International Airport	Moncton	608,982	92.6%	n/a^{D}		n/a^{D}	

== Notes ==
A.Statistics Canada figures.
B.Airport operating authority figures.
C.Estimated from graph.
D.Numbers are "suppressed to meet the confidentiality requirements of the Statistics Act".
E.Estimated figure.
