= Cégep de Chicoutimi =

Public college in Chicoutimi, Quebec

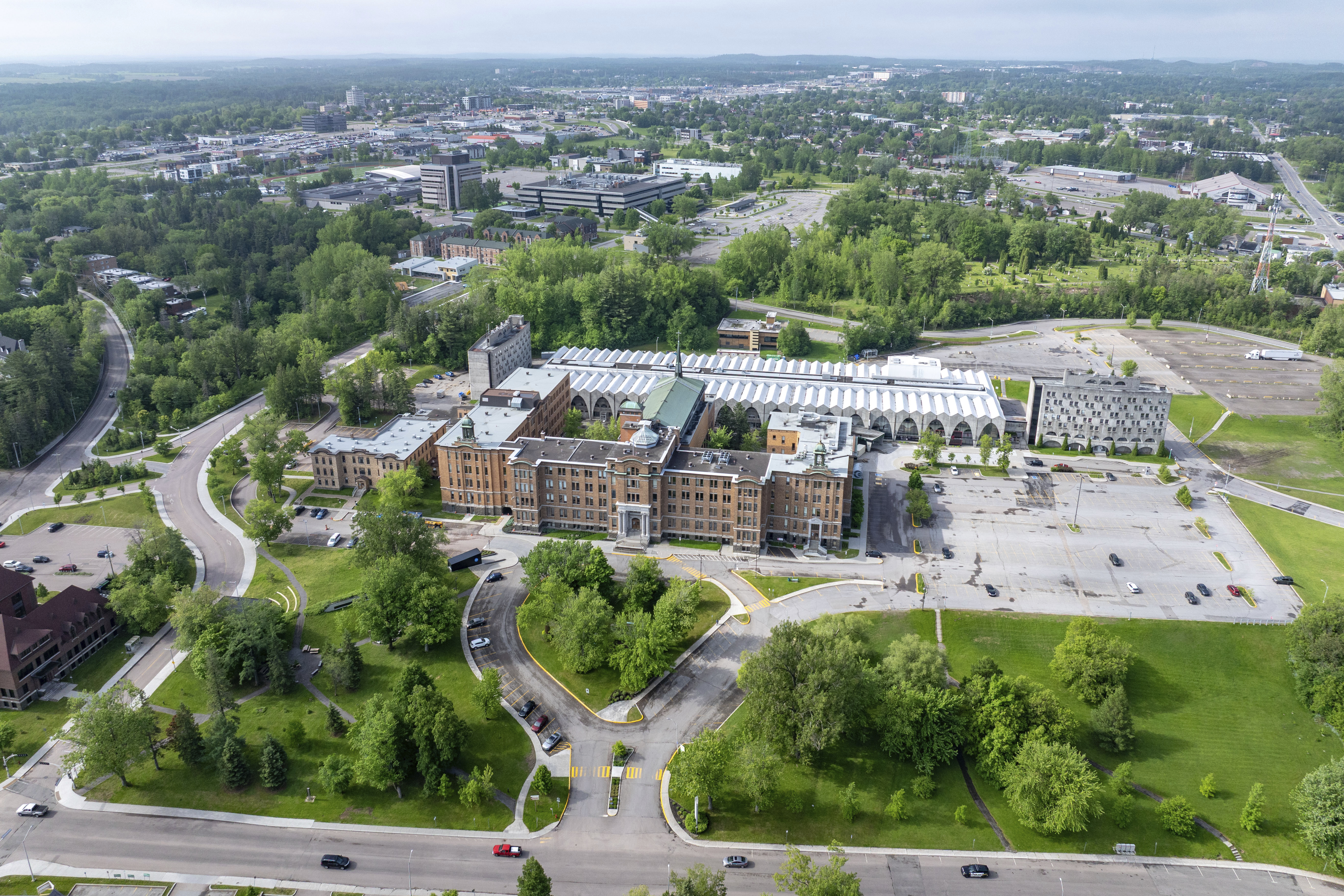
- Type: Public
- Established: 1967
- Students: 3,000
- Location: Saguenay, Quebec, Canada; 48.424249°N 71.051954°W
- Language: French
- Website: www.cegep-chicoutimi.qc.ca

The Cégep de Chicoutimi is a post-secondary institution in the province of Quebec, Canada. It is located in the Chicoutimi borough of the City of Saguenay. It is one of four CEGEPs in the Saguenay-Lac-Saint-Jean region.

The Cégep de Chicoutimi has approximately 3,000 students and 600 employees. In addition to providing educational training, it also serves as a social and cultural complex with community services such as a physical training centre.

== History ==
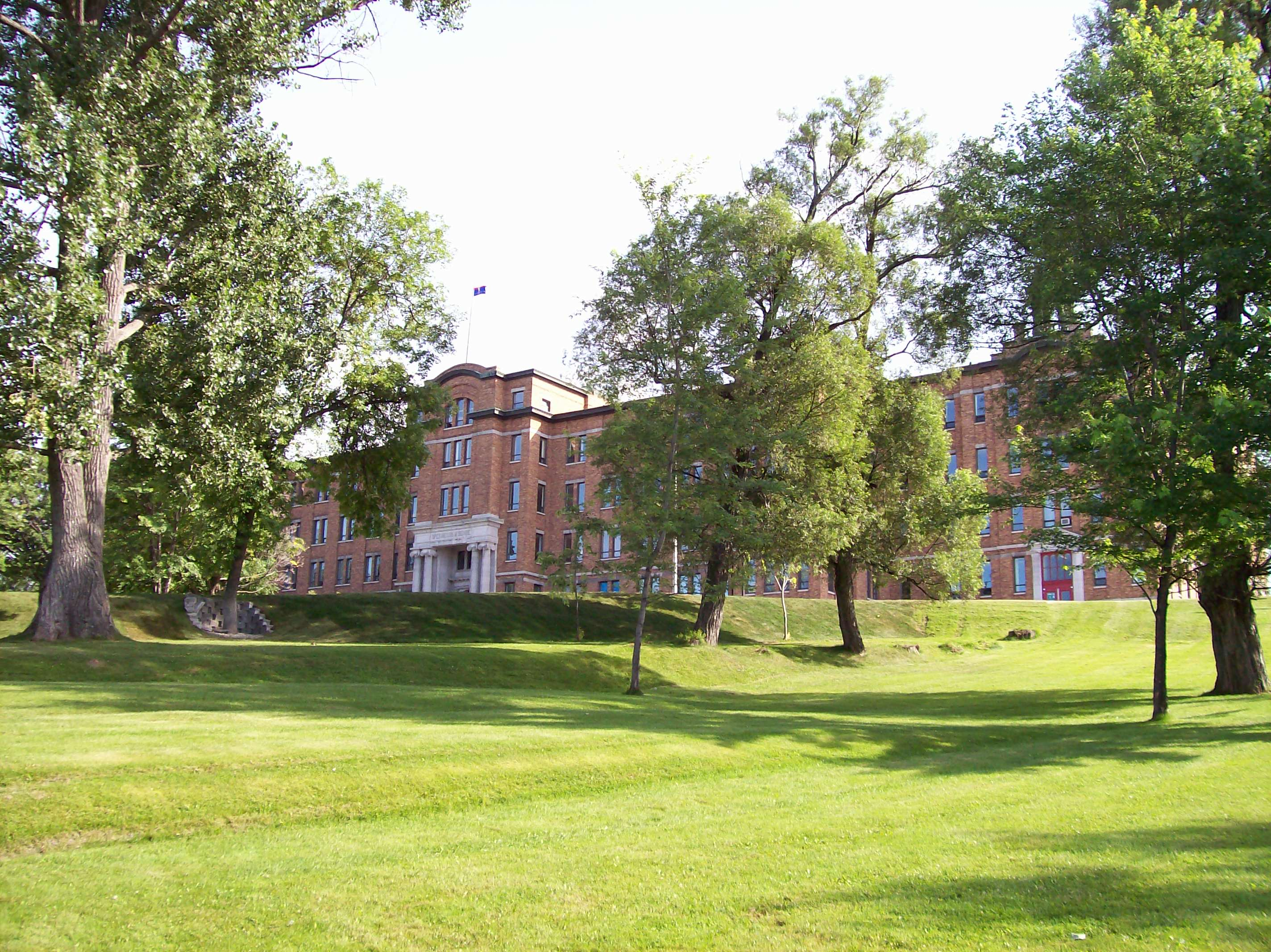
The former seminary, now wing F.

Founded in July 1967, while the CEGEP network was being established, the Cégep de Chicoutimi was formed through the merger of the Séminaire de Chicoutimi, the École des infirmières de l'Hôtel-Dieu Saint-Vallier, the Institut familial de Chicoutimi, the Institut de technologie de Chicoutimi and the École de Commerce de Chicoutimi. It was the first CEGEP in Quebec to obtain its letters patent.

Since 1996, the Cégep de Chicoutimi has been affiliated with the Centre d'Études de Forestville, which is located in the Haut-Côte-Nord region. The Cégep de Chicoutimi invested over $100, 000 on July 1, 2016, to update furnishings and IT equipment at the Centre d'Études de Forestville.

In 1997, the Cégep de Chicoutimi became affiliated with the Center for Geomatics of Quebec (French: Centre de géomatique du Québec) (CGQ), which offers Research and development, technical support and training services to businesses. The CGQ is recognized by Quebec's Ministry of Education and Higher Learning as a College Centre for the Transfer of Technologies (CCTT).

The Cégep de Chicoutimi has also been affiliated with the Quebec aeronautic training centre (French: Centre québécois de formation aéronautique) (CQFA) [the ] since 1968. The CQFA is located at the airport in the city of Saint-Honoré, Quebec. It offers a three-year aviation program in conjunction with the Cégep de Chicoutimi. During their first year, students are asked to choose among the three offered specializations: multi-engine airplane, helicopter and seaplane. The CQFA is the only public piloting training center in Quebec and the biggest in Canada. At the end of the three-year program, students obtain their professional piloting license in their chosen specialization along with a diplôme d’études collégiales (DEC).

On September 21, 2009, Quebec's Ministry of Economic Development, Innovation and Export Trade, together with Industry Canada, awarded the Cégep de Chicoutimi 5.7 million dollars. These funds were used to build new facilities for the Centre for Geomatics of Quebec and to renovate existing infrastructure. Construction on the CGQ building was completed in 2011. This building is LEED-certified and includes offices, laboratories, and conference rooms.

From 2001 to 2004, the Cégep de Chicoutimi offered a program in human resources training in Djibouti. Later, in 2010, the Cégep de Chicoutimi launched an electrical program in Senegal, with $300,000 in funding from the Government of Canada. These funds were made available through the Canadian International Development Agency's Skills for Employment Initiative.

=== Campus ===
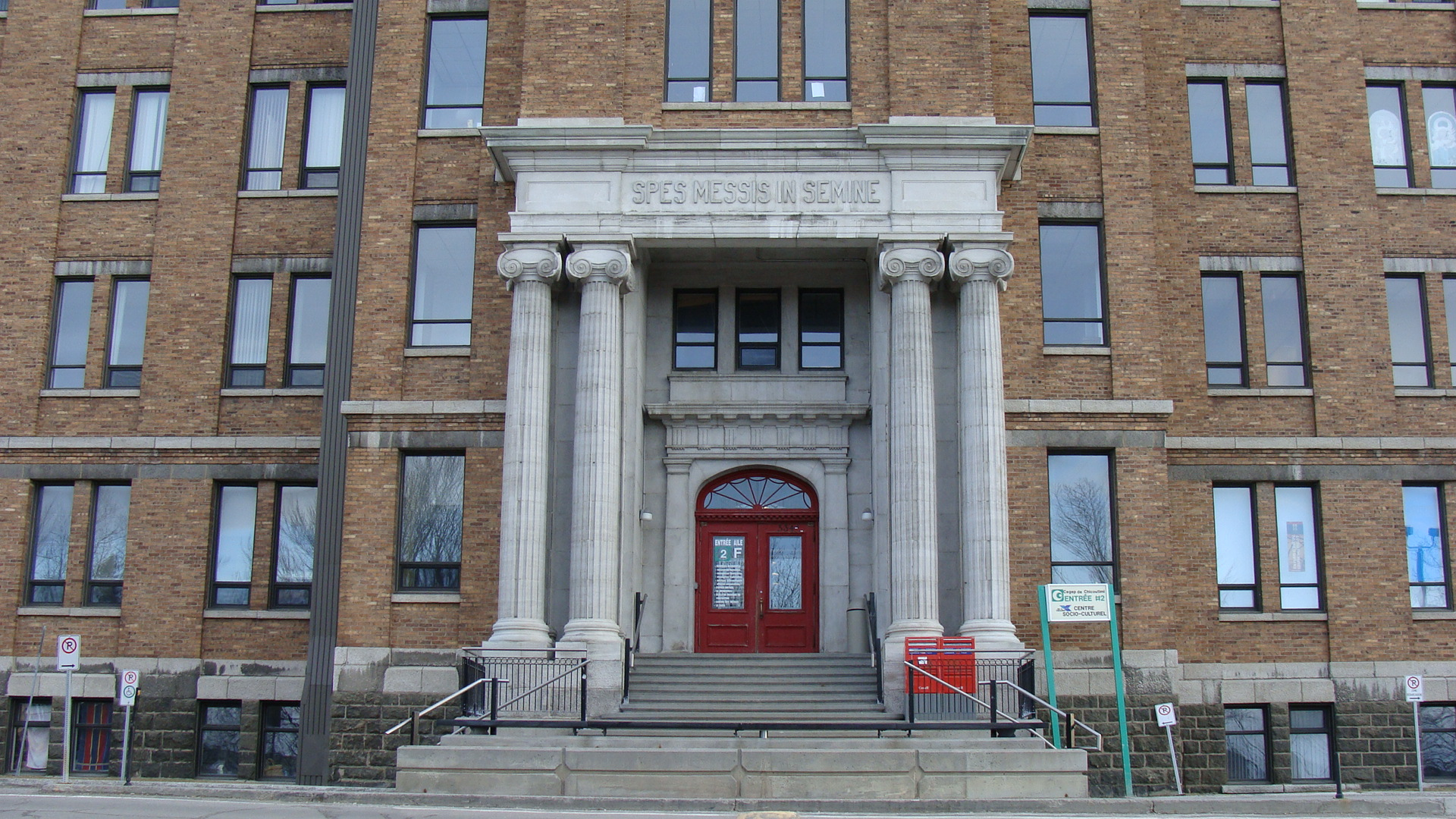
The main entrance to wing F. The Latin motto Spes messis in semine ("The hope of the harvest is in the seed") is engraved above the portico.

The Cégep de Chicoutimi's campus is composed of several wings: with the exception of wing G (the Centre for Geomatics of Quebec), all of these wings are connected to one another. In wing A are the offices for various student services, including financial aid and counselling, along with the psychology department and the pre-university programs. Wing B houses the library, IT support services, the English department, and the French writing centre.

Wing C consists of classrooms and laboratories for physics, health sciences, and the IT administration programs. BRICC, an architectural and renovations consultation service offered to the public by the architecture program, is also located in wing C. The dental hygiene program is located in wing E, while wing F contains the literature department and other classrooms, multipurpose rooms and auditoriums, as well as the art gallery Bang! Centre d'art actuel.

Wing H includes classrooms and laboratories for several departments: chemistry, biology, geography, physical education, and mathematics. Also located here are the cafeteria, student centre, COOPSCO student co-op, the student radio station, security and first aid office, photocopying services, and the Theatre Banque Nationale (formerly the Dufour Auditorium). Various athletic facilities, such as the swimming pool, gymnasium, and weight-training room, are also located in wing H.

Wing T is the Tremblay residence building, which also houses the social sciences department, and the philosophy and religious studies department. It is also where the offices of the teachers' union and the Quebec Student Sports Federation (French: Réseau du sport étudiant du Québec) are located. Wing L is the Lemieux residence building. The two residence buildings have a total of 185 rooms.

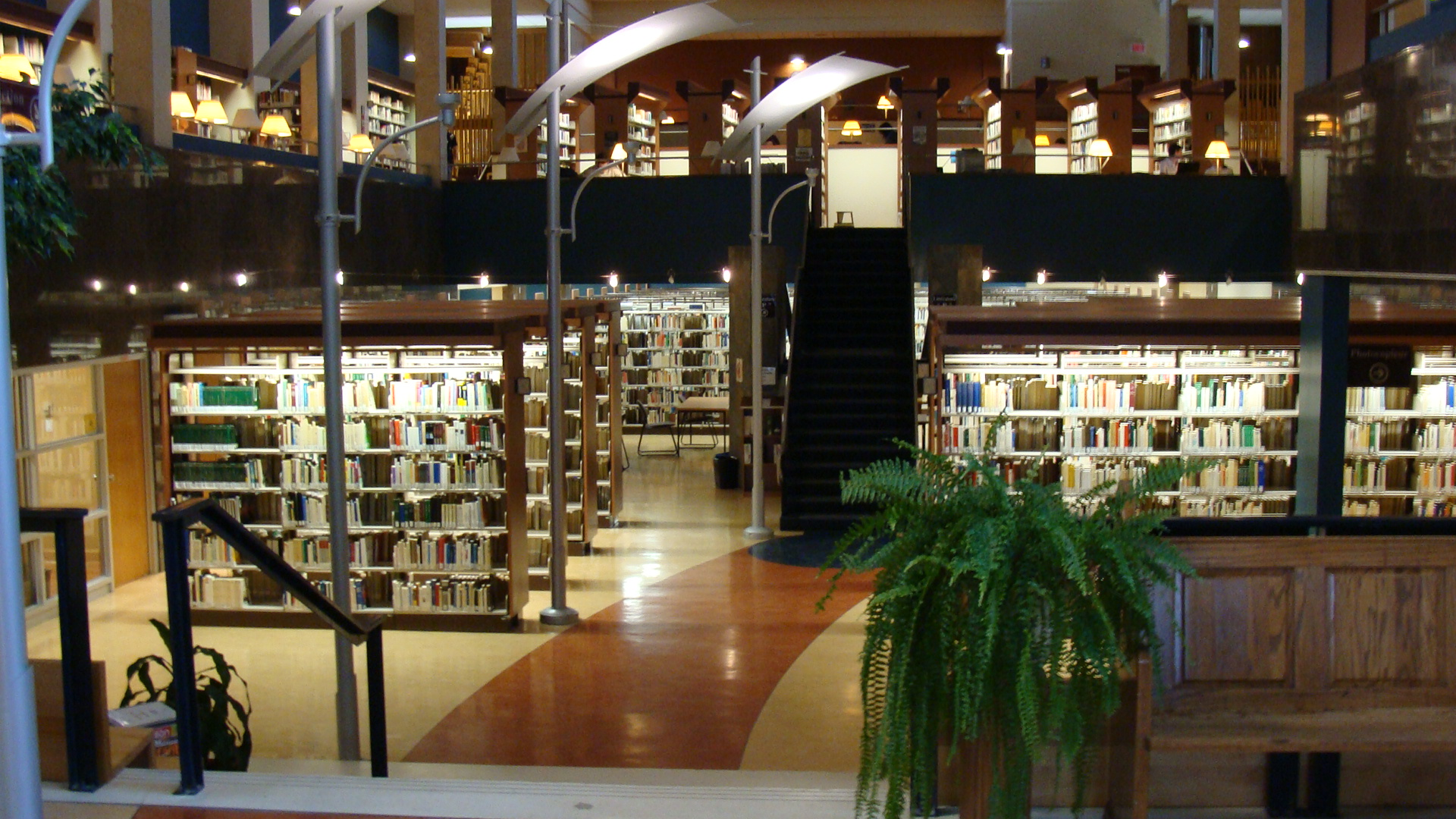
Library

== Programs of study ==
The Cégep de Chicoutimi offers approximately 20 pre-university and technical programs. It is the only public CEGEP in Quebec to offer an aviation program recognized by the Ministry of Education, Recreation and Sports. It does so via the Centre québécois de formation aéronautique (CQFA) [the Quebec aeronautic training centre], located in Saint-Honoré, Quebec.
