= Boundary Bay Airport =

Boundary Bay Airport Vancouver/Boundary Bay Airport
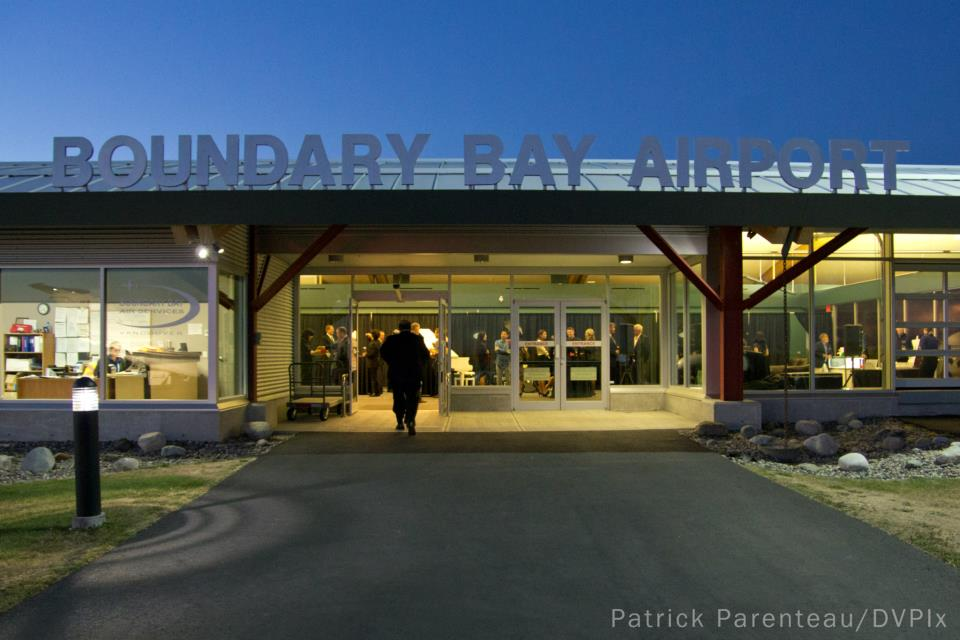
- IATA: YDT; ICAO: CZBB

Summary
- Airport type: Public
- Owner: Corporation of Delta
- Operator: Alpha Aviation Inc.
- Location: Delta, British Columbia
- Time zone: MST (UTC−07:00)
- Elevation AMSL: 6 ft (1.8 m)
- Coordinates: 49°04′24″N 123°00′30″W
- Website: www.czbb.com

Map
- Location in Vancouver CZBB (Canada)

Runways
Direction	Length		Surface
Direction	ft	m	Surface
07/25	6,015	1,833	Asphalt
13/31	5,605	1,708	Asphalt

Helipads
Number	Length		Surface
Number	ft	m	Surface
Pad 2	68 (dia)	21 (dia)	Concrete
Pad 3	68 (dia)	21 (dia)	Concrete
Pad 4	60 (dia)	18 (dia)	Concrete
Pad 5	65 (dia)	20 (dia)	Concrete
Pad 6	60 (dia)	18 (dia)	Concrete

Statistics (2021)
- Aircraft movements: 248,000
- Sources: Canada Flight Supplement and Transport Canada; Movements from Statistics Canada

Boundary Bay Airport or Vancouver/Boundary Bay Airport (IATA: YDT, ICAO: CZBB) is located beside Boundary Bay and 2.5 nautical miles (4.6 km; 2.9 mi) east of Ladner in Delta, British Columbia, Canada, 8.5 NM (15.7 km; 9.8 mi) south southeast of Vancouver and close to the Point Roberts-Boundary Bay border crossing. The airport, which opened on July 11, 1983, serves mostly general aviation and includes facilities for aircraft maintenance, flight training and parking. In 2020 and 2021, Boundary Bay airport was ranked as the busiest airport in Canada by aircraft movements.

The airport is classified as an airport of entry by Nav Canada and is staffed by the Canada Border Services Agency (CBSA). CBSA officers are available on call to handle entry for aircraft carrying no more than 15 passengers.

== History ==
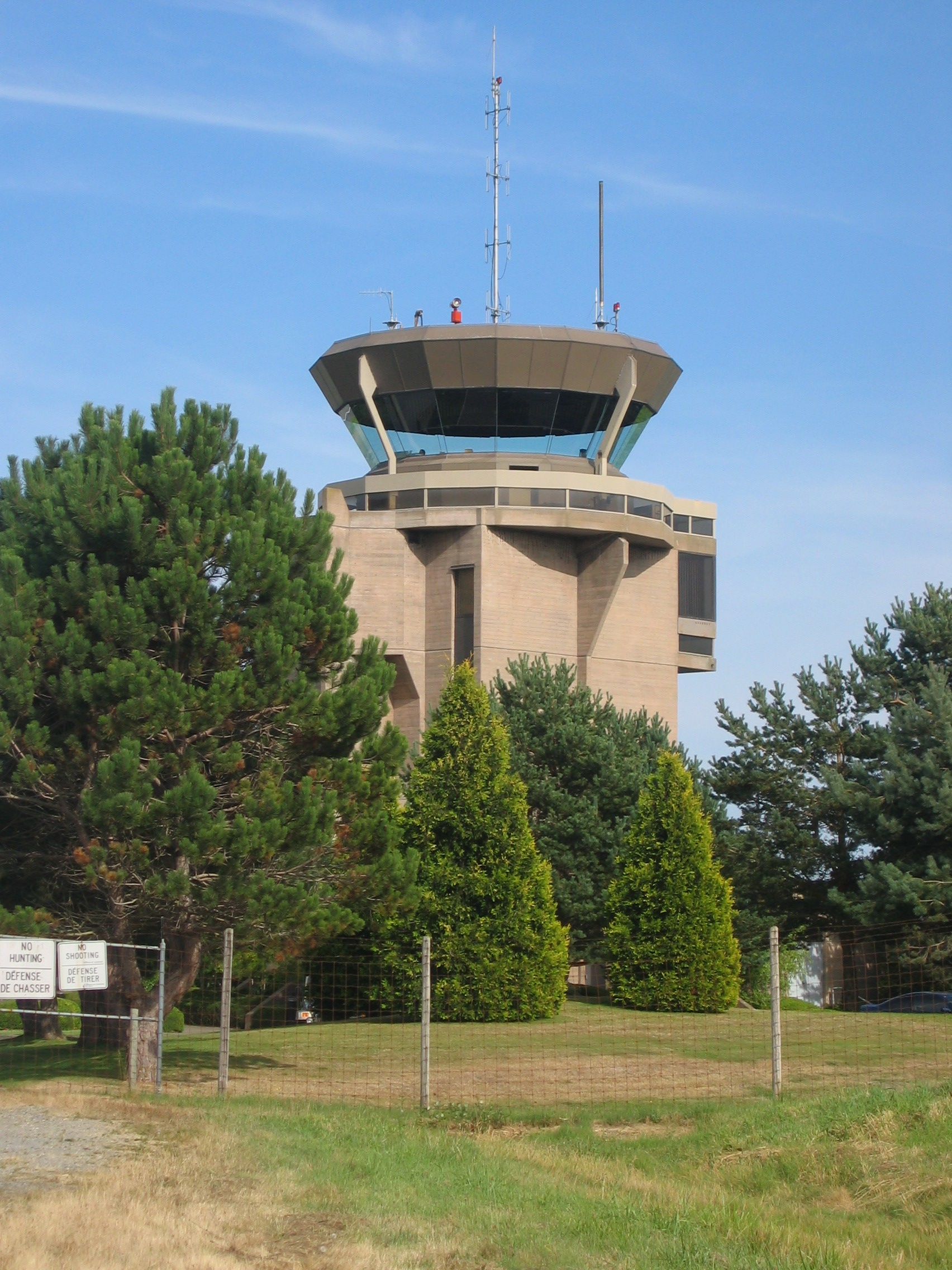
Control tower at Boundary Bay

=== World War II ===
The airfield was originally built in 1941 as Canadian Forces Station Ladner to teach Royal Canadian Air Force and Royal Air Force recruits to be pilots in the Second World War. Operational squadrons operated out of Boundary Bay to provide air defence support against a potential Japanese invasion until early 1944. During the war, more than 6,000 students and personnel passed through the station. After the war, the base was no longer required, and the airfield was decommissioned by the Royal Canadian Air Force in 1946 after it served as a demobilization centre for troops returning from the war.

In the late 1940s, the site was transferred to the Royal Canadian Corps of Signals and became a signals intelligence station under the name Vancouver Wireless Station. The station was responsible for monitoring Soviet Union military communications at the height of the Cold War and played an important role for gathering communications from the Soviet Union and its fleet. A 40-hectare residential community was developed that included amenities such as a grocery store, social club, gymnasium and a sports field. Remnants of this community are still present today as the North 40 Park Reserve, an off-leash dog park and walking trail.

When the armed forces was unified in 1968, the station's name changed to CFS Ladner. The station eventually closed in 1971 due to the installation of nearby power lines in Ladner that made gathering signals difficult.

Following the closure of CFS Ladner, the site was used by the community of Ladner for picnics, public fairs and auto racing.

=== Reactivation as an Airport ===
By the mid-1970s, when it became obvious that Vancouver International Airport could no longer sustain both general aviation and heavy commercial traffic, Transport Canada explored several options and determined that it was most economical to reactivate Boundary Bay as a reliever field to handle general aviation aircraft. The airport underwent restoration, and on July 11, 1983, two of the three runways were reopened as Boundary Bay Airport. A new control tower was built to the west of the field and air traffic services were provided. The remaining runway was made available for driver training and other events, until it became hangarage options for privately owned aircraft.

The field was initially owned and operated by Transport Canada until it was sold to the City of Delta for a nominal fee of $1. Operations and development of the airport was contracted out to a third-party, but the facilities degraded over time until the municipal government vacated its contract with the management company.

In December 2004, the City of Delta contracted Alpha Aviation to develop the airport. Boundary Bay Airport was acquired by Alpha Aviation under a lease with the City of Delta. Under the terms of the lease, driver training, autocross and drag racing were removed from the airport, allowing Alpha Aviation to focus on runway, facility and land-use improvements. In April 2008, Alpha Aviation established a fixed-base operation (FBO) and Alpha Executive Air began operating regularly scheduled flights twice daily between Boundary Bay Airport and Victoria International Airport on Vancouver Island, as well as chartered aircraft services. As of 2010, Alpha Executive Air ceased operations but the FBO is open serving business, corporate, and general aviation customers.

Investment by Alpha Aviation and significant grants from the British Columbia government enabled an extension of runway 07/25, improving usability of the runway for corporate jets, as well as other infrastructure improvements. The upgrades enables Boundary Bay Airport as an alternative landing destination to Vancouver International Airport.

Under Alpha Aviation, significant investments have been made to improve airport facilities and infrastructure, such as runway extensions to all runways, installation of PAPI lighting, construction of new fuel facilities, and the construction of multiple hangars including a 250,000 sq ft (23,000 m^{2}) maintenance hangar. The old maintenance hangar, the only remaining building from the war has been rehabilitated and declared a heritage site. In February 2010, and in time for the 2010 Winter Olympics, Alpha Aviation opened a new terminal building. This facility serves general aviation and private aircraft, with FBO services run by Alpha Aviation. The new facility will allow Boundary Bay Airport to accommodate regional airlines.

In 2011, the Corporation of Delta extended Alpha Aviation's lease until 2099.

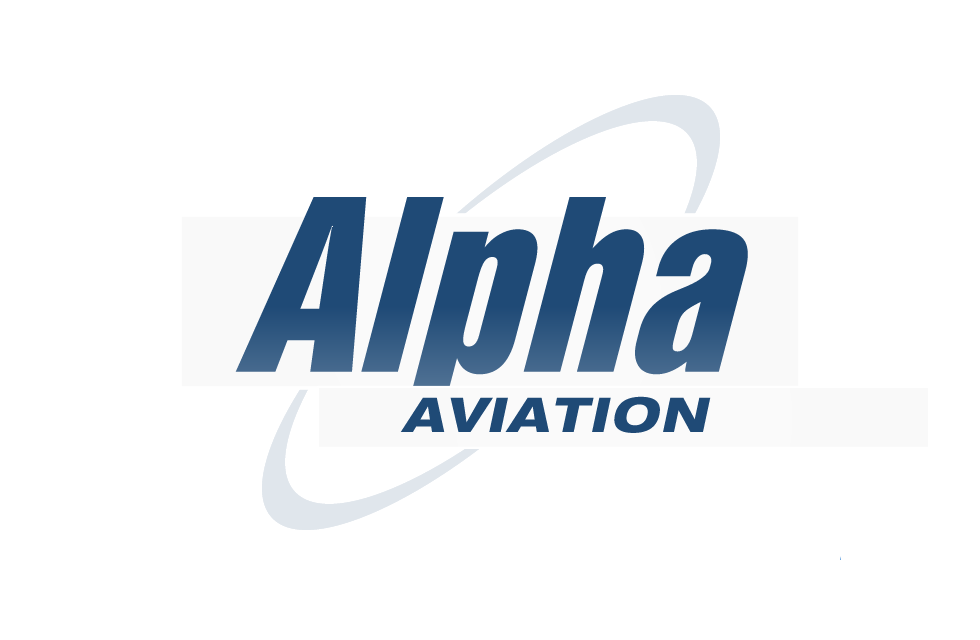
Alpha Aviation logo

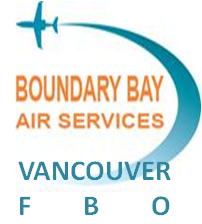
Boundary Bay Air Services logo

== Airlines and destinations ==
Until early 2023, Air West Charters and Oceanside Air provided on-demand air charter to destinations throughout British Columbia. Since then, there has been no hub-and-spoke operator based out of Boundary Bay. BC Air does provide services, but as a point-to-point operator.

Airlines	Destinations
BC Air	Charter: Abbotsford, Courtenay, Hope, Kamloops, Kelowna, Langley, Merritt, Nanaimo, Princeton, Port Alberni, Port Hardy, Powell River, Qualicum Beach, Rivers Inlet, Squamish, Stuart Island, Tofino, Vancouver, Victoria

== Fixed-base operator ==
As of 2011, only one FBO operates at Boundary Bay Airport:

- Boundary Bay Air Services

== Flight training ==
Five flight schools are based at the airport:

- International Flight Centre
- Insignia College
- Pacific Flying Club
- Pacific Professional Flight Centre
- Sea Land Air

== Fuel services ==
Fuel services at Boundary Bay Airport are run by Alpha Aviation. Fuels available:

- Avgas 100LL
- Jet A-1

Fuel system icing inhibitor and oil are also available.

== See also ==
- List of airports in the Lower Mainland
