= Region of Waterloo International Airport =

International airport serving the Regional Municipality of Waterloo

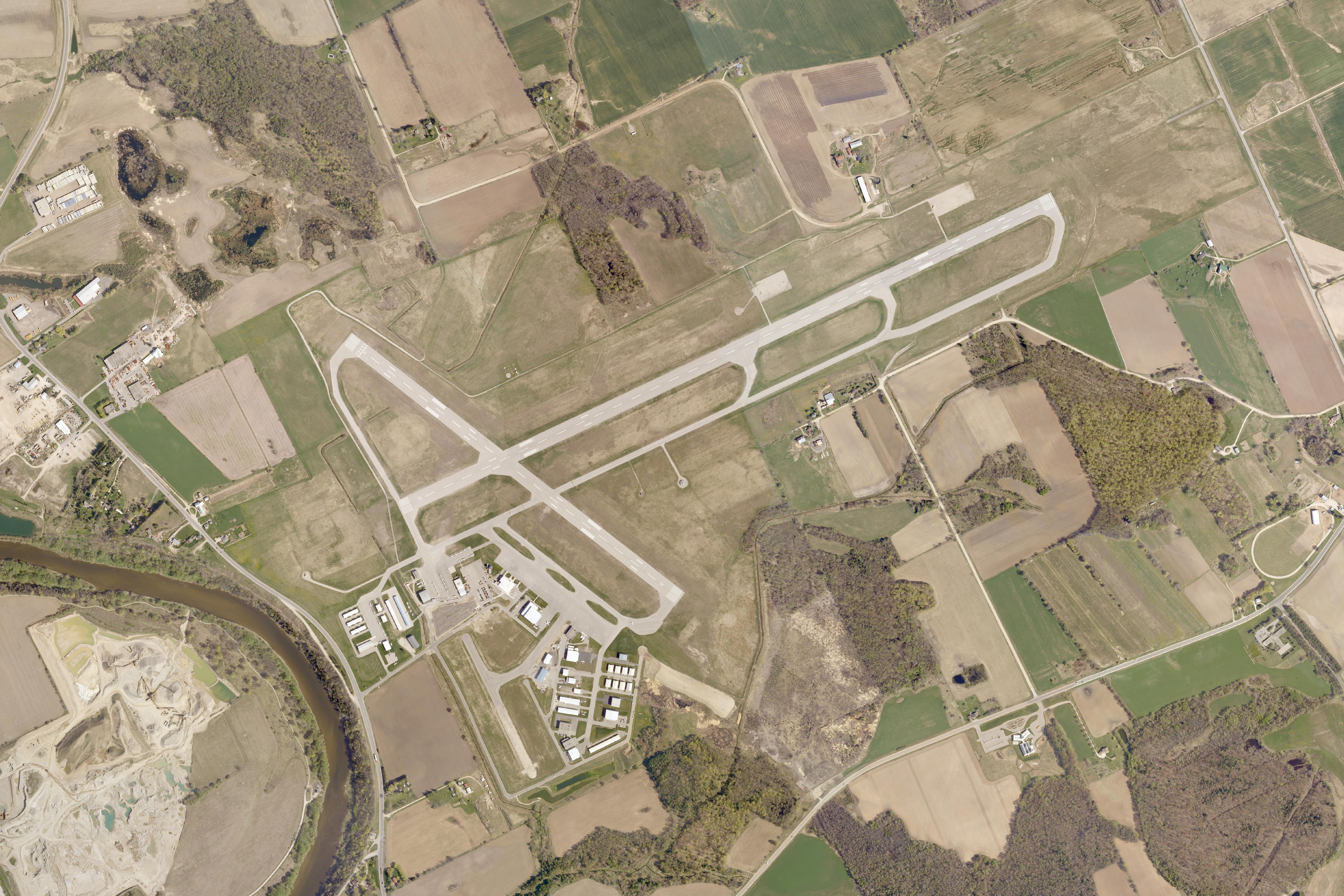
- IATA: YKF; ICAO: CYKF; WMO: 71368

Summary
- Airport type: Public
- Operator: Regional Municipality of Waterloo
- Serves: Tri-Cities, Ontario; Guelph, Ontario
- Location: Woolwich, Ontario
- Opened: 1930
- Focus city for: Flair Airlines; Pivot Airlines
- Time zone: EST (UTC−05:00)
  - Summer (DST): EDT (UTC−04:00)
- Elevation AMSL: 1,054 ft (321 m)
- Coordinates: 43°27′39″N 080°22′43″W
- Public transit access: Grand River Transit 78 79
- Website: www.waterlooairport.ca

Map
- Location in Ontario CYKF (Canada)

Runways
Direction	Length		Surface
Direction	ft	m	Surface
08/26	7,003	2,135	Asphalt
14/32	4,103	1,251	Asphalt

Statistics (2025)
- Aircraft Movements: 145,313
- Total Passengers: 426,500
- Sources: Canada Flight Supplement; Environment Canada; Aircraft movement and passenger statistics from Waterloo Airport

Region of Waterloo International Airport or Kitchener/Waterloo Airport (IATA: YKF, ICAO: CYKF) is an international airport serving the Regional Municipality of Waterloo in Woolwich, Ontario, Canada, west of Toronto. It has year round daily flights to Edmonton, Vancouver, Calgary, Orlando, Halifax, Fort Lauderdale and Kelowna through Flair Airlines and WestJet. It also has seasonal flights to Cancún through Sunwing Airlines and Flair Airlines. In 2022, the airport ranked seventh-busiest in Canada by total aircraft movements and twentieth-busiest by passenger traffic.

The airport is classified as an airport of entry by Nav Canada and is staffed by the Canada Border Services Agency (CBSA). CBSA officers at this airport can handle any general aviation aircraft up to 180 people with two hours prior notice.

The terminal building has an international/domestic lounge. There are two separate baggage carousels, one for domestic and the other international. There are four gates (one international, one domestic arrivals, two domestic departures) at this terminal to handle scheduled flights. There is a licensed sit-down eating area and a vending area for people travelling through the airport.

== History ==
The airport was previously named Waterloo Regional Airport, but it changed its name in March 2004 after Northwest Airlines announced that it would run daily flights to Detroit, Michigan.

Construction began on the Kitchener-Waterloo Municipal Airport, also known as Lexington Airport, in 1929, on the Heinrich farm on Lexington Road in Waterloo. The towns of Kitchener and Waterloo and the Ontario Equitable Life and Accident Insurance Company acquired the lands to build a land and water airport facility. Completed in 1930, the airfield was mainly used for flying instruction. The airport had two grass runways (1,800 ft [550 m] and 2,000 ft [610 m]) on 83 acres (34 ha) on the southeast side of Lexington Road.

Gilles Air Service began to operate from the airfield from 1930 to 1932 and was succeeded by Kitchener-Waterloo Flying Club from 1932 to 1951. During World War II, civilian aviation ceased at the airfield and it was used by the British Commonwealth Air Training Plan.

At the end of the war, there was a push for a larger and more appropriate place for private and commercial aviation in the area. In 1948, the Waterloo-Wellington Airport Commission acquired a larger site in the Breslau, Ontario, area and a new airfield opened there in 1950.

The original airport was sold in 1951 to A.B. Caya and re-developed into a mixed residential and commercial area. The entrance to the former airport is now Lexington Park at 291 Lexington Road.

The new K-W Municipal Airport became a general aviation facility in 1969. From 1951 to 1973, the Waterloo-Wellington Flying Club ran the airport and then sold it to Waterloo Region and the City of Guelph. It became a publicly owned airport and was renamed Waterloo Regional Airport. Today it operates 24 hours, seven days a week.

The airport's former name, Waterloo Regional Airport, is now used by Waterloo Regional Airport in Waterloo, Iowa.

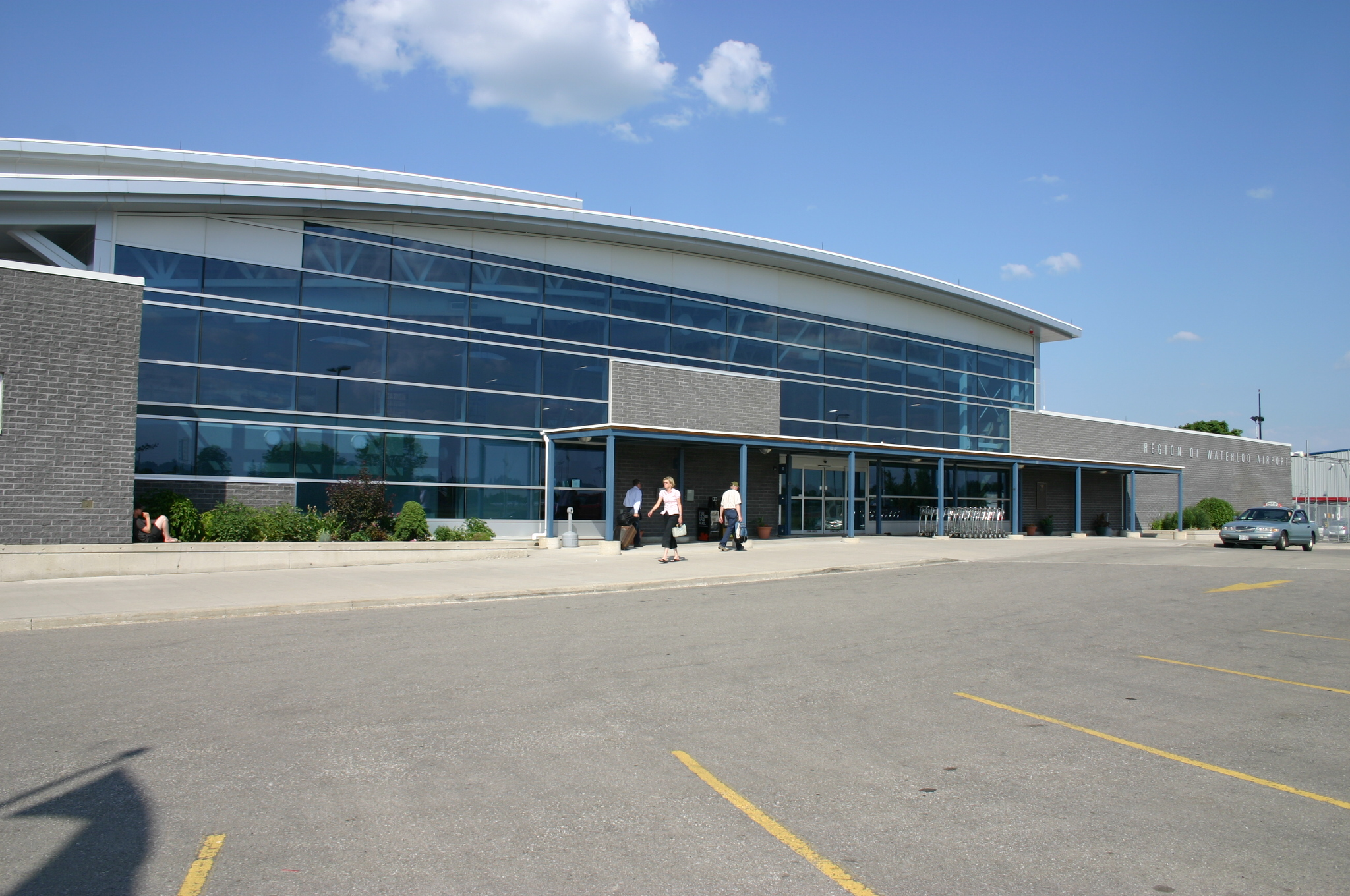
The terminal building

In November 2020, Waterloo was the busiest airport in Canada, owing to the continued operation of its flight-training businesses while much of Canadian aviation was shut down by the COVID-19 pandemic in Ontario.

=== Lexington Airport then and now ===
A historical plaque near the entrance of Lexington Park describes the runways.

=== Expansion ===
Waterloo underwent a major expansion in 2003. Starting in 2008, the airport started expanding again to accommodate larger aircraft on the aprons and taxiways; this includes widening the main apron 3, expanding apron 2 into apron 3, new widened taxiway alpha and Charlie taxiway off apron 2 to runway 08, and approach lighting on runway 26. In 2010, Taxiway Charlie was widened to prepare for a new development area called "LL4." A new general manager recruited from the Greater Toronto Airports Authority, Chris Wood, was appointed in September 2009.

Northwest Airlines affiliate Mesaba Airlines flew to Detroit until June 2009.

In late 2005, major vacation charters (primarily to the Caribbean) began to operate during their peak season, notably Sunwing Airlines to Cancún.

WestJet launched daily flights to Calgary on 14 May 2007. This was initially labelled a seasonal service, but on 27 June 2007, WestJet announced that the flights would continue year-round. WestJet also operated daily seasonal flights to Vancouver in the summer of 2010, but these did not continue in subsequent years.

Bearskin Airlines started daily non-stop flights to Ottawa on 1 October 2007, with onward connections to Northern Ontario, and added daily flights to Montreal beginning on 1 May 2011. The Montreal flights ended in September 2012, and on 25 March 2014, Bearskin announced that they would terminate all scheduled service from the airport effective 1 April 2014. They continued to operate charter flights at the airport.

On 13 December 2011, American Airlines announced new daily nonstop flights to Chicago beginning on 14 June 2012, the airport's first destination in the United States since 2009. The service was operated by Envoy under the American Eagle brand, using Embraer 145 jets. On 22 June 2016, American Airlines announced they would be suspending flights effective 5 October 2016.

In September 2013, Nolinor Aviation began three weekly and four every other week charter service from the airport to Mary River via Iqaluit with a Boeing 737-200 combi. This service was expected to bring $400,000 annually to the airport through landing and ramp fees with no additional costs to the region. Nolinor no longer makes regular flights out of the airport.

A new air traffic control tower commenced operations on 27 September 2017, replacing the original tower built in 1969. This tower is an additional 16 feet taller (80 feet) and 85 square feet bigger than the previous tower.

Low-cost carrier Flair Airlines began flying to six domestic destinations in May 2021. This was later expanded to 9 Canadian destinations plus 2 US and Cancún, Mexico - some of them seasonal.

In April 2021, Waterloo Regional Council approved $44 million to further the expansion of the airport. As part of this expansion, the airport will get increased baggage handling capacity and larger departure lounges. This was completed in 2023.

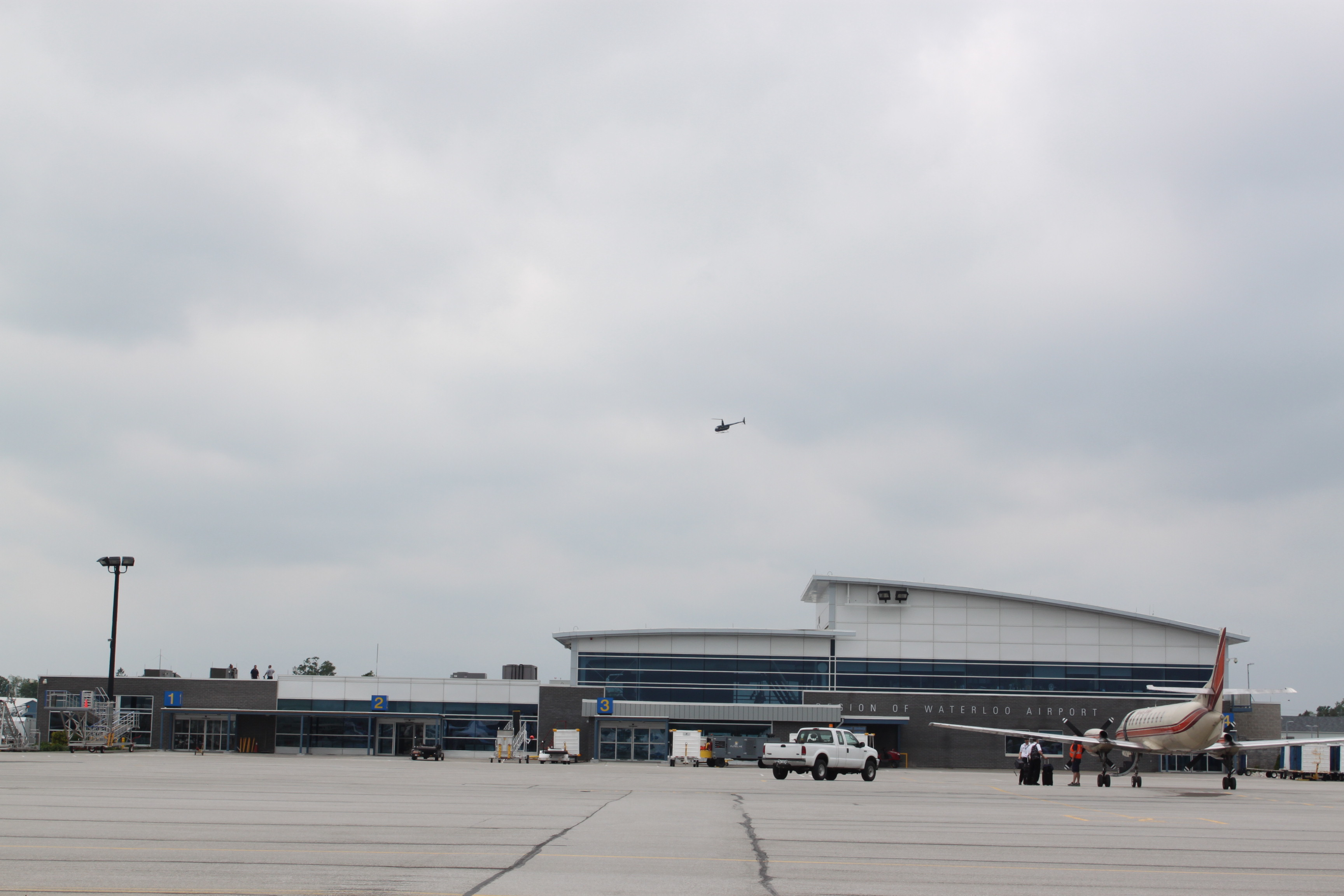
The Waterloo Terminal as seen from Taxiway Bravo

== Airlines and destinations ==
Airlines	Destinations
Flair Airlines	Calgary, Halifax, Seasonal: Edmonton
WestJet	Calgary; Seasonal: Cancún, Punta Cana

== Ground transportation ==
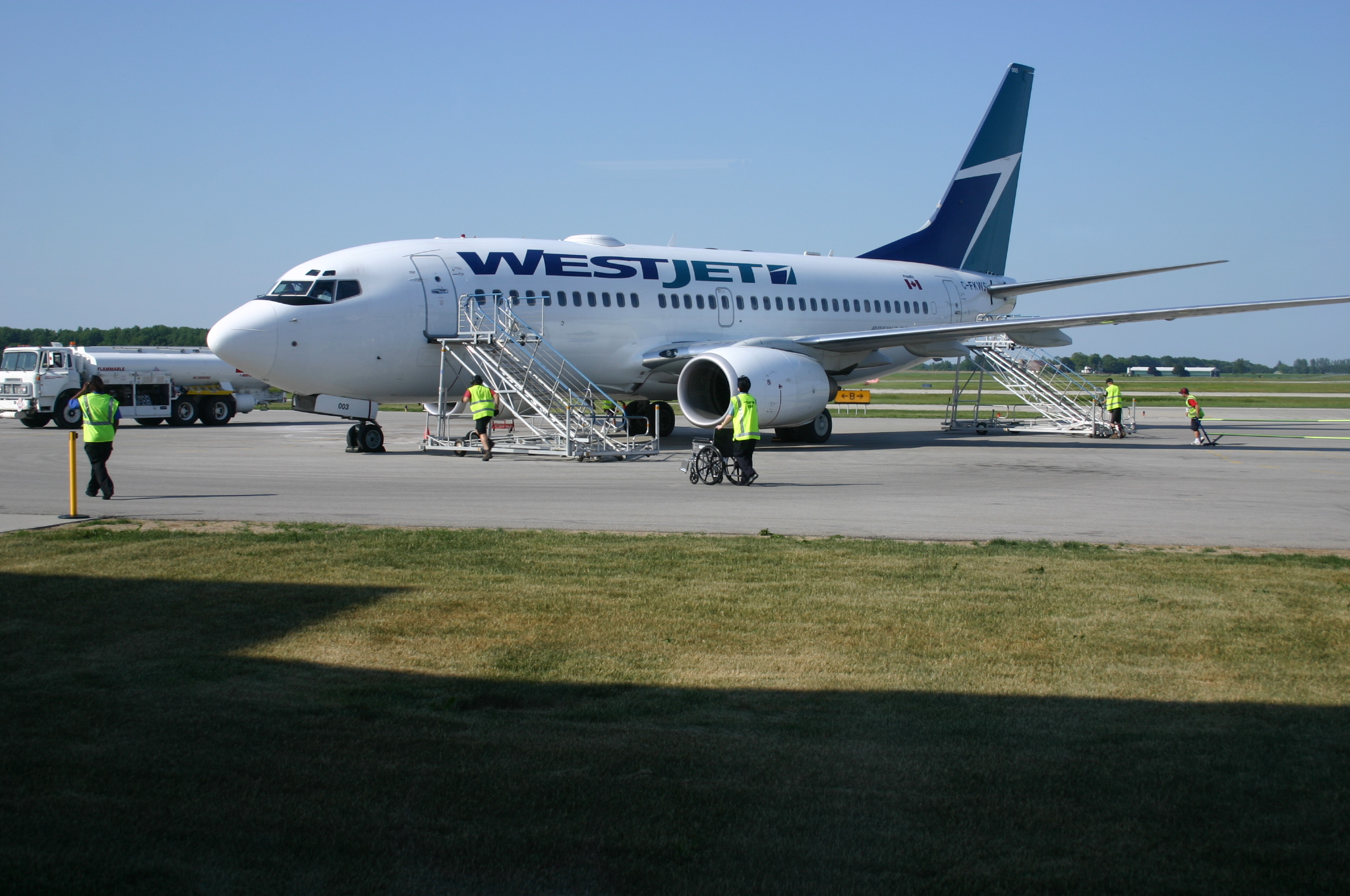
A WestJet 737-700 plane at YKF

Local taxis, limousines, and chartered buses provide ground transportation to and from the airport. Private cars park at three parking lots located at the airport. Parking pay stations are located at the main lot and in the terminal concourse area.

The main road to access the airport is Regional Road 17 or Fountain Street North. Fountain intersects with Highway 7 to the north (access to Waterloo and Guelph) or with Highway 401 to the south (access to London and Toronto). Connections to Kitchener became easier in 2013 with the extension of Fairway Road across the Grand River to Fountain Street.

On 11 July 2022, Grand River Transit, the public transit operator in the area, began operating a flexible bus route in Breslau, including the airport. It operates as an on-demand bus service operating weekdays between 6am and 10am, 2pm and 6pm, and 10:45pm and 11:45pm. The bus route offers connection to Route 204 iXpress Victoria and Route 34 Bingemans at Victoria Street and Lackner Boulevard. On 2 September 2024, Grand River Transit began operating Route 78 that runs between Sportsworld Station and the airport.

=== Airline coaches ===
Operator	Destinations
Air Canada (operated by Landline)	Toronto–Pearson

Air Canada operates "land-air" motorcoach connection services between Kitchener/Waterloo International Airport and Toronto Pearson International Airport, as they are deemed too close geographically for regularly scheduled flights to be operated economically. The service provides ticketed Air Canada and Star Alliance passengers with multiple daily non-stop ground connections between Kitchener/Waterloo Airport and Terminal 1 at Toronto Pearson.

== Tenants ==
- Aerotech Aviation – private aircraft maintenance
- Flightpath Charter Airways – charter and cargo operator
- AirSprint – private business jet operator
- Private Air – private business jet operator
- Nav Canada – air traffic control services
- Executive Aviation – ground handler for Westjet Airlines & Sunwing Airlines
- Flite Line Services – fixed-base operator, fuel, ground handling
- Kitchener Aero Avionics – manufacturer and maintenance of avionics equipment
- Rotor Services – helicopter maintenance, R22/R44 overhaul, leasing, pre-purchase inspections and flight training
- Tri-City Aero – maintenance and repair of small private aircraft
- Reliable Horse Power – custom aircraft engine overhauls and repairs
- Summit Fuel Services
- Chartright Air Group
- National Car Rental
- Avis Rent a Car System
- Hertz car rental
- Runways Café at WWFC – licensed restaurant
- Aviator Cafe (by Edelweiss) – licensed food concession in terminal boarding (departure) lounge & arrivals lounge
- Canada Border Services Agency
- Royal Canadian Air Cadet Youth Development Centre, 822 Tutor Squadron – air cadets
- Gyro Craft Aviation – gyroplane sales and rental

== Flight training schools ==
- Adler Aviation – training centre for small propeller aircraft
- Great Lakes Helicopter – small and medium utility helicopter training
- Gyro Ontario – Ontario's only gyroplane flight training facility, working out of Great Lakes Helicopter training facility
- Waterloo-Wellington Flight Centre (with links to Conestoga College and University of Waterloo)

== Maintenance and emergency services ==
The airport has service vehicles, including a dedicated snow plow, as well as their own fire suppression and rescue unit (two Oshkosh Striker 1500).

== Incidents and accidents ==
- On 25 November 2022, Flair Airlines Flight 501, a Boeing 737-800 from Vancouver to Kitchener/Waterloo carrying 134 passengers and 6 crew, overran runway 26 while landing. There were no injuries.
- On 11 March 2023, a Boeing 737 aircraft operated by Flair Airlines was seized as part of a payment dispute with a New York based aircraft lessor.
- In March 2025, 2 picketers were struck by vehicles in 2 separate incidents as a result of a CUPE strike.

== See also ==
- List of airports in Ontario
- List of airports in Canada
