= Canadian Forces Station Ladner =

Former military airfield in Delta, British Columbia

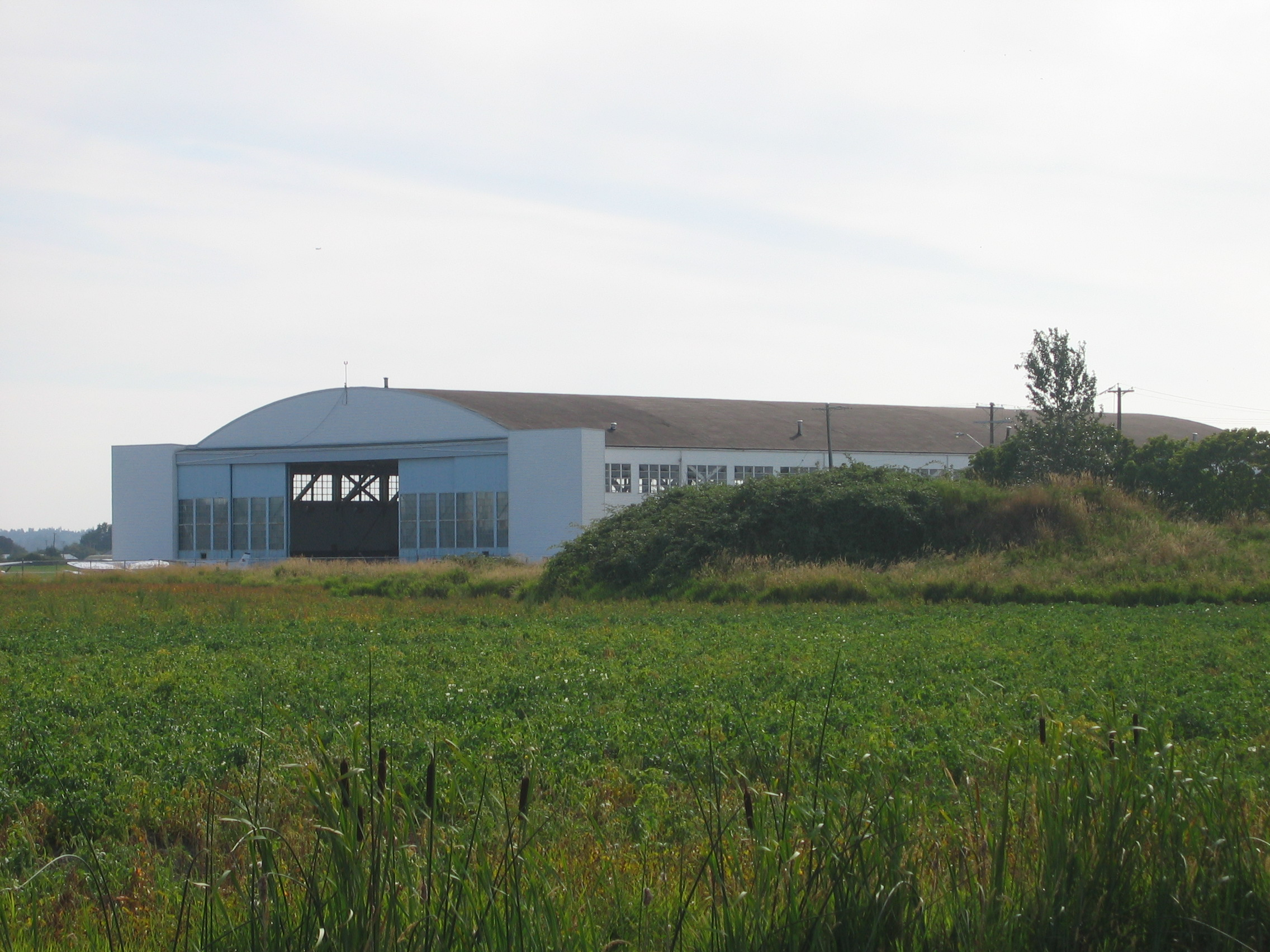
- The main hangar at Boundary Bay is the only original structure left from the RCAF station.
- IATA: none; ICAO: none

Summary
- Airport type: ~~Military~~
- Owner: ~~Canadian Forces Air Command~~
- Location: Delta, British Columbia
- Time zone: PST (UTC−08:00)
  - Summer (DST): PDT (UTC−07:00)
- Elevation AMSL: 6 ft (1.8 m)
- Coordinates: 49°04′26″N 123°00′27″W
- Website: www.CZBB.com

Map
- Location in British Columbia

Runways
Direction	Length		Surface
Direction	ft	m	Surface
~~07/25~~	~~5,606~~	~~1,709~~	~~Asphalt~~
~~12/30~~	~~3,755~~	~~1,145~~	~~Asphalt~~
- Sources: Canada Flight Supplement

Canadian Forces Station Ladner is a former military airfield and communications station located beside Boundary Bay and 2.5 nautical miles (4.6 km; 2.9 mi) east of Ladner in Delta, British Columbia, Canada, south of Vancouver and close to the U.S. border. After its closure it was reopened as Boundary Bay Airport.

== History ==
=== World War II (1940–1946) ===
After the British Commonwealth Air Training Plan came into effect in 1939, the Royal Canadian Air Force began looking for locations at which to train aircrew for the Second World War. Boundary Bay was one location that was selected, and in 1940, land from three farms was appropriated for an airport. Construction proceeded slowly as boggy areas had to be filled with hay and gravel, but gravel roads and runways were in place for the airfield's opening on 10 April 1941. No. 18 Elementary Flying Training School (No. 18 EFTS) was the first unit established at the newly created Royal Canadian Air Force Station Boundary Bay. Flying De Havilland Tiger Moth biplanes, No. 18 EFTS's training was provided by private civilian instructors. The aerodrome was officially opened on 2 July 1941. This school was sponsored by the Aero Club of B.C and named the Vancouver Air Training Co. Ltd. (VATC). On 25 May 1942, No. 18 EFTS was disbanded as a direct result of the attack on the American Naval station at Pearl Harbor. It was felt that the west coast was now vulnerable to attack by the Japanese and Boundary Bay was the most advantageous location for a fighter squadron to protect Vancouver and the surrounding coast. No. 18's personnel and equipment were transferred to Royal Air Force No. 33 RAF EFTS in RCAF Station Caron, where the civilian staff took over operations from RAF staff.

Between early 1942 and April 1944 three operational fighter squadrons rotated through Boundary Bay. No. 133 Squadron, equipped with Hawker Hurricanes was the first, while No. 14 and No. 132, both of which flew Curtiss Kittyhawks, were assigned later. On 1 April 1944 No. 5 Operational Training Unit, (OTU), was established at Boundary Bay. No. 5 OTU was created for the purpose of training Commonwealth crews to fly the American-built Consolidated Liberator. By 1944 the Royal Air Force had decided to increase bombing operations in southeast Asia and the Pacific and the bomber of choice was the B-24. Boundary Bay was chosen because of its close proximity to the mountains and ocean which, it was believed, helped to create similar flying conditions that would be found in the future theater of operations. In addition to the Liberator, the North American Mitchell was used as a stepping stone to the four-engined Liberators. Other aircraft used by the unit included the Bristol Bolingbroke for target-towing, the Curtiss Kittyhawk for fighter affiliation exercises and a Noorduyn Norseman as a utility aircraft. Shortly after the first course graduated, it was decided that the crews would require additional air gunners. Therefore, a satellite unit was needed to facilitate the additional staff. On 15 July 1944 No. 5 OTU Abbotsford Detachment was created and the Liberators moved to Abbotsford. Boundary Bay was now responsible for the initial training and the Liberator crews would graduate out of Abbotsford. After the war, the airport was no longer needed. No. 5 OTU left the airfield on 31 October 1945, and the RCAF decommissioned the station in 1946. RCAF Boundary Bay's last official function of the war was to act as a demobilization centre for the Royal Canadian Air Force.

==== Aerodrome information ====
In approximately 1942 the aerodrome was listed as RACF Aerodrome - Boundary Bay, British Columbia at 49°05′N 123°01′W with a Var. 24 degrees 20' E and elevation of 4.5 feet (1 m). The aerodrome was listed with three runways as follows:

Runway name	Length	Width	Surface
7/25	6,000 feet (1,829 m)	200 feet (61 m)	Hard surfaced
1/19	5,000 feet (1,524 m)	200 feet (61 m)	Hard surfaced
12/30	5,000 feet (1,524 m)	200 feet (61 m)	Hard surfaced

=== Postwar (1949–1971) ===
The site was left unused until it was transferred to Royal Canadian Corps of Signals in 1949. Re-established as the Vancouver Wireless Station call sign WVS, the site operated radio equipment for communication and gathering signals intelligence. The Vancouver Wireless Station had facilities much like other post-war bases, including singles quarters, 150 permanent married quarters, dining halls and messes, a Medical Inspection Room, administration building, gymnasium with a sport field with 2 ball diamonds and tennis courts, a chapel, woodworking and automotive shops, a grocery store (later CANEX), engineering and transport sections and a fire hall. Most of these facilities were located on a property directly north of the airfield.

When the Canadian Forces were unified in 1968, the site was renamed Canadian Forces Station Ladner. The downsizing associated with unification would soon hit CFS Ladner, and in 1971 it was permanently closed.

=== Rebirth (1971–present) ===
Following the closure of the base, the site was used by the community of Ladner for picnics, public fairs and auto racing. When it became apparent that Vancouver International Airport could no longer sustain general aviation and commercial traffic, Transport Canada proposed reactivating Boundary Bay for general aviation. The airport underwent restoration, and on 11 July 1983 two of the three runways were reopened as Boundary Bay Airport. The other runway and some ramp space was made available for driver training and other events.

The municipality of Delta maintains the area north of the airport as North 40 Park Reserve. The park features a walking trail, interpretive signs, and an off-leash dog area.
