= Chicoutimi/Saint-Honoré Airport =

Airport in Saint-Honoré, Canada

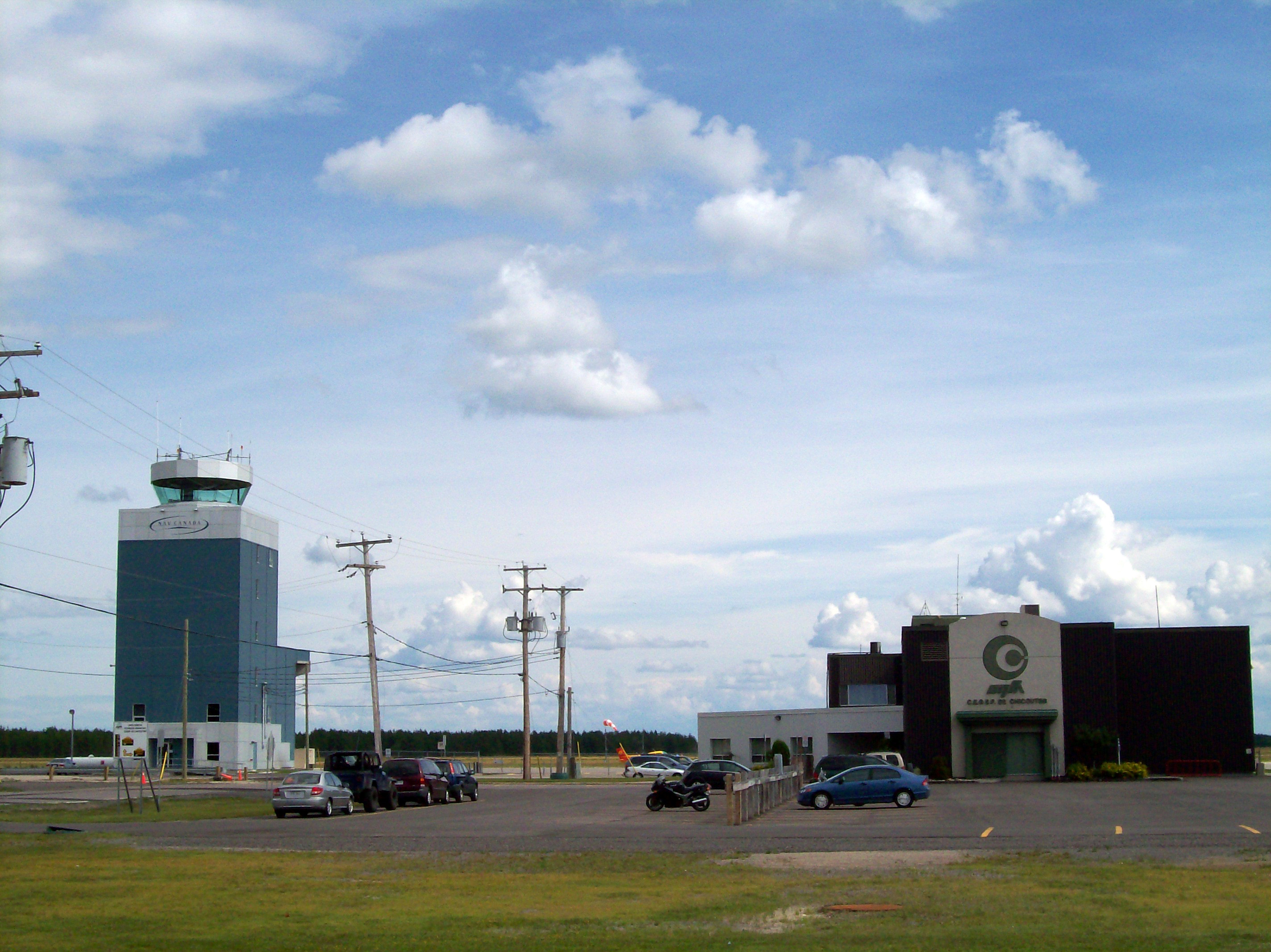
- NAV CANADA control tower at Saint-Honore
- IATA: none; ICAO: CYRC

Summary
- Airport type: Public
- Owner/Operator: Transports Québec
- Serves: Chicoutimi, Quebec
- Location: Saint-Honoré, Quebec
- Time zone: EST (UTC−05:00)
  - Summer (DST): EDT (UTC−04:00)
- Elevation AMSL: 544 ft / 166 m
- Coordinates: 48°31′15″N 071°03′02″W

Map
- Location in Quebec

Runways
Direction	Length		Surface
Direction	ft	m	Surface
06/24	3,735	1,138	Asphalt
12/30	6,085	1,855	Asphalt
18/36	3,597	1,096	Asphalt

Statistics (2017)
- Aircraft movements: 106,087
- Sources: Canada Flight Supplement; Movements from Statistics Canada

Chicoutimi/Saint-Honoré Airport (ICAO: CYRC) is located 1.5 nautical miles (2.8 km; 1.7 mi) east southeast of Saint-Honoré and approximately 5.6 nautical miles (10.4 km; 6.4 mi) from Chicoutimi in Quebec, Canada.

== History ==
The site, north of the Saguenay River, was selected by the Royal Canadian Air Force in the summer of 1941 and construction began shortly thereafter with the aerodrome opening in June 1942 as RCAF Station St-Honoré. It was operated as a sub-base to RCAF Station Bagotville and supported pilot training during the Second World War under the British Commonwealth Air Training Plan. It was closed on January 5, 1945 and was subsequently transferred to the local community after it ceased to have a military purpose. RCAF Station Bagotville was reactivated in 1951 as a training and operational base and continues to this day as CFB Bagotville.

=== Aerodrome ===
In approximately 1942 the aerodrome was listed at 48°31′N 71°03′W with a Var. 23 degrees E and elevation of 539 feet (164 m). All three runways were listed as "under construction" and detailed as follows:

Runway name	Length	Width	Surface
7/25	4,200 feet (1,280 m)	150 feet (46 m)	Asphalt
1/19	4,200 feet (1,280 m)	150 feet (46 m)	Asphalt
13/31	5,100 feet (1,554 m)	150 feet (46 m)	Asphalt
