= Langley Regional Airport =

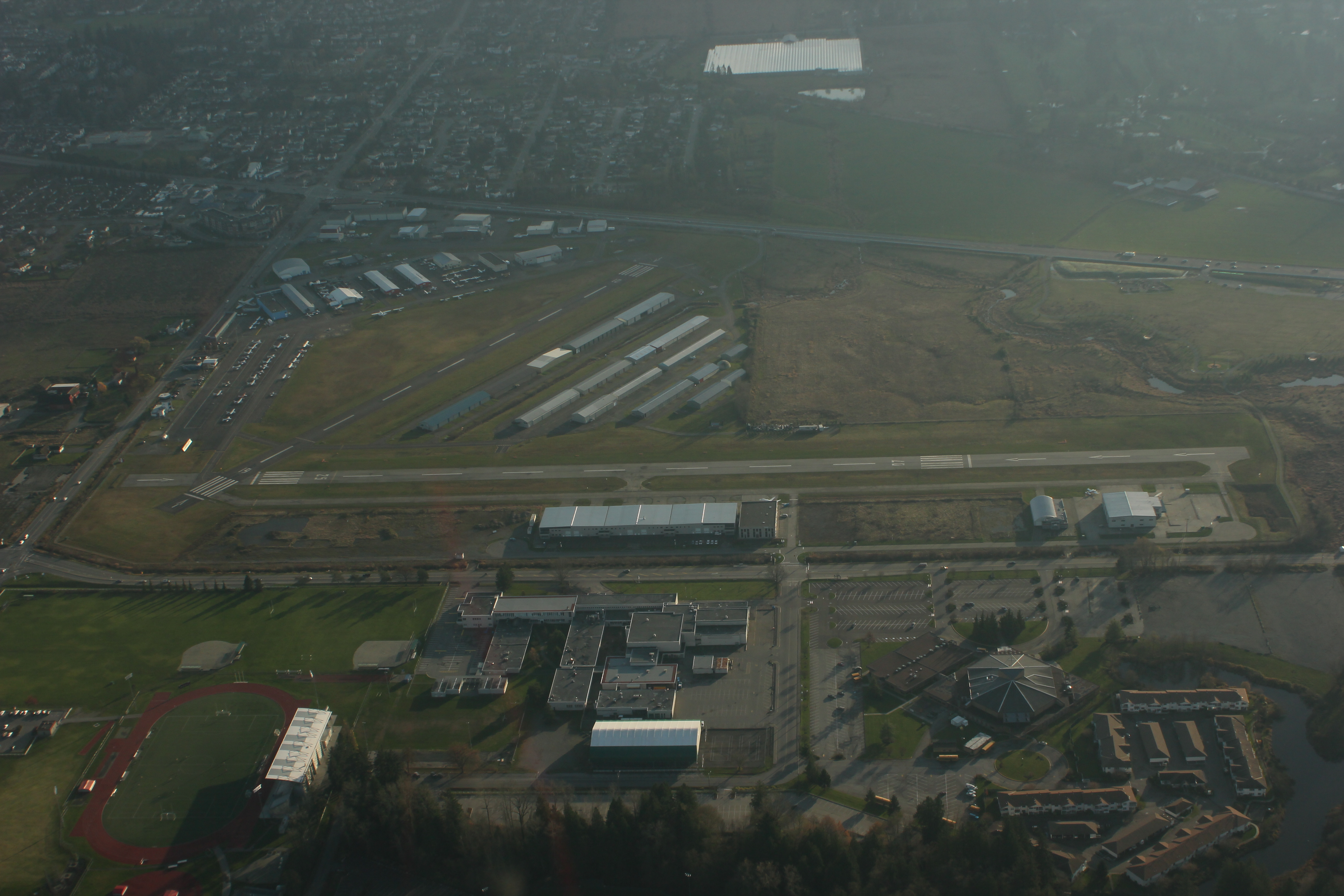
- Langley Airport as seen with its two paved runways
- IATA: YLY; ICAO: CYNJ

Summary
- Airport type: Public
- Operator: Township of Langley
- Serves: Langley Township
- Location: Langley, British Columbia
- Time zone: MST (UTC−07:00)
- Elevation AMSL: 34 ft / 10 m
- Coordinates: 49°06′11″N 122°37′36″W
- Website: www.tol.ca/en/ynj.aspx

Map
- Location in British Columbia CYNJ (Canada)

Runways
| Direction | Length | | Surface |
| Direction | ft | m | Surface |
|---|---|---|---|
| 01/19 | 2,100 | 640 | Asphalt |
| 07/25 | 2,743 | 836 | Asphalt |

Helipads
| Number | Length | | Surface |
| Number | ft | m | Surface |
|---|---|---|---|
| B | 110 dia | 34 dia | Asphalt |
| C | 85 dia | 26 dia | Asphalt |

Statistics (2010)
- Aircraft movements: 75,293
- Sources: Canada Flight Supplement; Movements from Statistics Canada

Langley Regional Airport (IATA: YLY, ICAO: CYNJ) is located in Langley Township, British Columbia, Canada. It serves mostly general aviation, and also provided scheduled passenger service to the Victoria Airport Water Aerodrome via seaplanes operated by Harbour Air before service was ended on May 20, 2011. Helicopter operations are a major part of Langley Airport's traffic; the airport has two helipads.

The airport offers fuel services and extensive hangar space, and hosts the Canadian Museum of Flight.

== General information ==
The airport has two asphalt runways, one 2,100 ft × 75 ft (640 m × 23 m) and the other 2,743 ft × 75 ft (836 m × 23 m). These relatively short runways make it a good airport for flight training purposes because a pilot who trains on short runways is likely to be more capable. There is also a public road near each end of the paved runway (01/19) resulting in relatively short "Takeoff Distance Available" (TODA).

Due to the proximity of residential areas, runway 19 has a departure noise-abatement procedure that requires a 30-degree turn, and runway 25 has a departure noise-abatement procedure that requires a 50-degree turn.

Langley radio frequencies are 119.00 for the control tower, 124.50 for Automatic Terminal Information Service (ATIS), and 121.90 for ground service.

The airport is home to 54 businesses, including many helicopter operators and fixed-wing and rotary-wing flight training units. Consequently the airport has a high volume of training traffic.

== History ==
In 1945, at the end of World War II, the township of Langley leased the former Royal Canadian Air Force airport from the federal government before purchasing the airport outright in 1967 for $24,300. Since then, the airport has been in continuous operation.

== See also ==
- List of airports in the Lower Mainland
