= Saint-Honoré, Quebec =

Saint-Honoré
- City
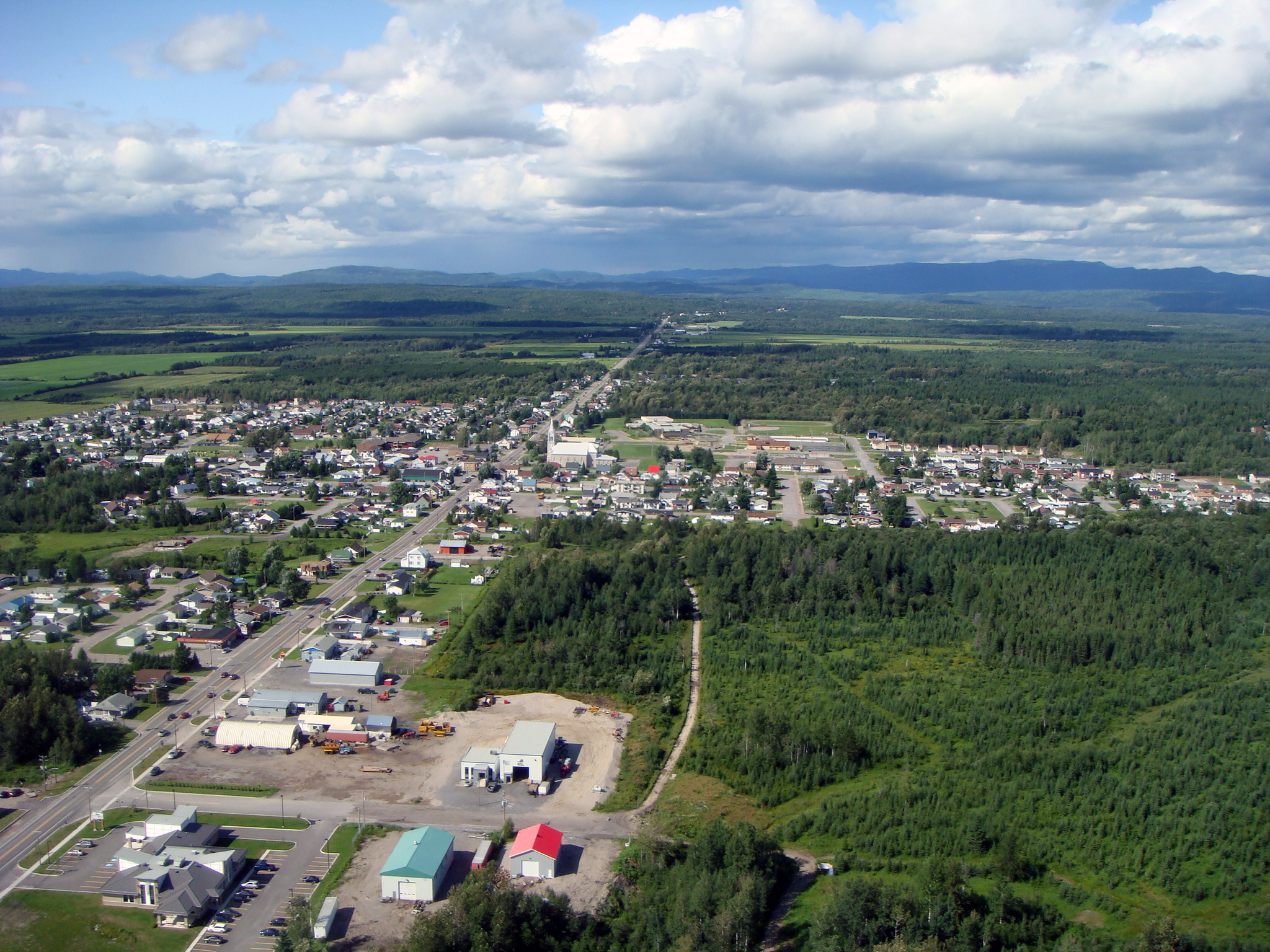
- Aerial view of Saint-Honoré

- Coat of arms

- Location in Saguenay–Lac-Saint-Jean Quebec.
- Coordinates: 48°32′N 71°05′W
- Country: Canada
- Province: Quebec
- Region: Saguenay–Lac-Saint-Jean
- RCM: Le Fjord-du-Saguenay
- Settled: 1863
- Constituted: December 16, 1972

Government
  - Mayor: Lucien Villeneuve
  - Federal riding: Chicoutimi—Le Fjord
  - Prov. riding: Dubuc

Area
  - Total: 190.90 km^{2} (73.71 sq mi)
  - Land: 189.38 km^{2} (73.12 sq mi)

Population (2021)
  - Total: 6,376
  - Density: 33.7/km^{2} (87/sq mi)
  - Pop (2016–21): ▲10.8%
  - Dwellings: 2,609
- Time zone: UTC−5 (EST)
  - Summer (DST): UTC−4 (EDT)
- Postal code(s): G0V 1L0
- Area codes: 418 and 581
- Website: www.ville.sthonore.qc.ca

Saint-Honoré (French pronunciation: [sɛ̃.t‿ɔnɔʁe]) is a city in Quebec, Canada. It is the seat of Le Fjord-du-Saguenay Regional County Municipality and its most populous municipality.

== Demographics ==
Historical Census Data - Saint-Honoré, Quebec
Year	Pop.	±%
1976	2,657	—
1981	3,362	+26.5%
1986	3,643	+8.4%
1991	3,789	+4.0%
1996	3,851	+1.6%
2001	4,742	+23.1%
2006	4,727	−0.3%
2011	5,257	+11.2%
2016	5,757	+9.5%
2021	6,376	+10.8%

In the 2021 census conducted by Statistics Canada, Saint-Honoré had a population of 6,376 living in 2,535 of its 2,609 total private dwellings, a change of 10.8% from its 2016 population of 5,757. With a land area of 189.38 km^{2} (73.12 sq mi), it had a population density of 33.7/km^{2} (87.2/sq mi) in 2021.

Canada census – Saint-Honoré, Quebec community profile

	2021	2016	2011
Population	6,376 (+10.8% from 2016)	5,757 (+9.5% from 2011)	5,257 (+11.2% from 2006)
Land area	189.38 km^{2} (73.12 sq mi)	189.54 km^{2} (73.18 sq mi)	189.14 km^{2} (73.03 sq mi)
Population density	33.7/km^{2} (87/sq mi)	30.4/km^{2} (79/sq mi)	27.8/km^{2} (72/sq mi)
Median age	38.4 (M: 38.8, F: 38.4)	37.4 (M: 37.5, F: 37.4)	37.9 (M: 38.1, F: 37.7)
Private dwellings	2,609 (total)	2,286 (total)	2,083 (total)
Median household income	$89,000	$70,380	$N/A

References: 2021 2016 2011

Canada Census Mother Tongue - Saint-Honoré, Quebec
Census	Total	French			English			French & English			Other		
Year	Responses	Count	Trend	Pop %	Count	Trend	Pop %	Count	Trend	Pop %	Count	Trend	Pop %
2021	6,365	6,295	▲10.4%	98.9%	35	▲75.0%	0.5%	25	▲150.0%	0.4%	15	0.0%	0.2%
2016	5,750	5,700	▲9.1%	99.1%	20	▲100.0%	0.3%	10	▲ n/a	0.2%	15	▲50.0%	0.3%
2011	5,245	5,225	▲12.9%	99.6%	10	0.0%	0.2%	0	0.0%	0.0%	10	▼80.0%	0.2%
2006	4,695	4,630	▲20.7%	98.6%	10	0.0%	0.2%	0	▼100.0%	0.0%	50	▲ n/a	1.1%
2001	3,840	3,835	n/a	99.9%	10	n/a	0.3%	10	n/a	0.3%	0	n/a	0.0%

== Economy ==
The economy of Saint-Honoré is mainly based on agriculture and mining. Niobec is one of the mines located in Saint-Honoré, it is also the only active niobium mine in North America.

== Education ==
Saint-Honoré has two primary schools (Jean Fortin primary school and La Source school) and a Cégep de Chicoutimi campus run by the CQFA, dedicated to teaching aviation. Due to the growing number of families in Saint-Honoré, the provincial government invested $7.1 million to expand the Jean Fortin school. The town also has a municipal library open part-time.
