= April 9 =

April 9 this year in various calendars
- Thursday, 9 April 2026
Akan	Kwayaw
Armenian	23 Ahekani 1475
Aztec	Tlaxochimaco 9, 12 Ōlīn
Babylonian	20 Adaru, 2336 SE
Balinese pawukon	Luang, Pepet, Beteng, Sri, Umanis, Was, Wraspati of Sinta, Ludra, Jangur, Duka
Bengali	26 Chaitro, BS 1432
Chinese	Yin Water Ox・Dipper Mansion; Fire Horse Year, Month 2, Day 22 (Qingming, 11 days until Guyu)
Common Era	9 April 2026 CE
Coptic	1 Parmouti, AM 1742
Egyptian	28 Mesori, 2774 NE
Ethiopian	1 Miyāzyā, 2018 Amätä Məhrät
French Republican	Décade II, Décadi de Germinal de l'Année 234 de la République
Gregorian	9 April, AD 2026
Hebrew	22 Nisan, AM 5786; Omer 7
Hindu	Pūrvāṣāḍha・Parigha; Solar: 27 Caitra, 1947 SE; Lunisolar: Saptamī, Kṛishna pakṣa of Caitra, 2083 VE; Rāudra・5126 KY・1,872,674
Icelandic	Fimmtudagur, 17 Einmánuður 2025
Islamic	21 Shawwal, AH 1447 (using tabular method)
ISO week date	2026-W15-4
Japanese	22 Kisaragi, Reiwa 8 (Seimei, 11 days until Kokuu)
Julian	27 March, AD 2026 (AM 7534)
Julian day	2461140
Korean	22 Tokkidal, 4359 DE
Maya	13.0.13.8.17; 10 Pop, 12 Caban
Roman	ante diem VI Kalendas Apriles, MMDCCLXXIX AUC
Solar Hijri	20 Farvardin, SH 1405
Tibetan	22 dbo, me pho rta 2153 or 1772 or 1000

<<	April					>>
Su	Mo	Tu	We	Th	Fr	Sa
			1	2	3	4
5	6	7	8	9	10	11
12	13	14	15	16	17	18
19	20	21	22	23	24	25
26	27	28	29	30
2026

April 9 in recent years
2026 (Thursday)
2025 (Wednesday)
2024 (Tuesday)
2023 (Sunday)
2022 (Saturday)
2021 (Friday)
2020 (Thursday)
2019 (Tuesday)
2018 (Monday)
2017 (Sunday)

April 9 is the 99th day of the year (100th in leap years) in the Gregorian calendar; 266 days remain until the end of the year.

== Events ==
=== Pre-1600 ===
- 193 – The distinguished soldier Septimius Severus is proclaimed emperor by the army in Illyricum.
- 475 – Byzantine Emperor Basiliscus issues a circular letter (Enkyklikon) to the bishops of his empire, supporting the Monophysite christological position.
- 537 – Siege of Rome: The Byzantine general Belisarius receives his promised reinforcements, 1,600 cavalry, mostly of Hunnic or Slavic origin and expert bowmen. Despite shortages, he starts raids against the Gothic camps and Vitiges but is forced into a stalemate.
- 1241 – Battle of Liegnitz: Mongol forces defeat the Polish and German armies.
- 1288 – Mongol invasions of Vietnam: Yuan forces are defeated by Trần forces in the Battle of Bach Dang in present-day northern Vietnam.
- 1387 – The Byzantine city of Thessalonike surrenders to the Ottomans, though rule reverts back to the Byzantines after the battle of Ankara.
- 1388 – Despite being outnumbered 16:1, forces of the Old Swiss Confederacy are victorious over the Archduchy of Austria in the Battle of Näfels.
- 1438 – The Council of Ferrara begins with its first session in presence of the Patriarch of Constantinople, representatives of the Patriarchal Sees of Antioch, Alexandria and Jerusalem and Pope Eugene IV presiding.
- 1454 – The Treaty of Lodi is signed, establishing a balance of power among northern Italian city-states for almost 50 years.
- 1511 – Resettled Shiite Muslims rise up in the Şahkulu rebellion under the leadership of Şahkulu against the Ottoman Empire.

=== 1601–1900 ===
- 1609 – Eighty Years' War: Spain and the Dutch Republic sign the Treaty of Antwerp to initiate twelve years of truce.
- 1609 – Philip III of Spain issues the decree of the "Expulsion of the Moriscos".
- 1682 – Robert Cavelier de La Salle discovers the mouth of the Mississippi River, claims it for France and names it Louisiana.
- 1784 – The Treaty of Paris, ratified by the United States Congress on January 14, 1784, is ratified by King George III of the Kingdom of Great Britain, ending the American Revolutionary War. Copies of the ratified documents are exchanged on May 12, 1784.
- 1860 – On his phonautograph machine, Édouard-Léon Scott de Martinville makes the first known recording of an audible human voice.
- 1865 – American Civil War: Robert E. Lee surrenders the Army of Northern Virginia (26,765 troops) to Ulysses S. Grant at Appomattox Court House, Virginia, effectively ending the war.

=== 1901–present ===
- 1909 – The U.S. Congress passes the Payne–Aldrich Tariff Act.
- 1917 – World War I: The Battle of Arras: The battle begins with Canadian Corps executing a massive assault on Vimy Ridge.
- 1918 – World War I: The Battle of the Lys: The Portuguese Expeditionary Corps is crushed by the German forces during what is called the Spring Offensive on the Belgian region of Flanders.
- 1937 – The Kamikaze arrives at Croydon Airport in London. It is the first Japanese-built aircraft to fly to Europe.
- 1939 – African-American singer Marian Anderson gives a concert at the Lincoln Memorial after being denied the use of Constitution Hall by the Daughters of the American Revolution.
- 1940 – World War II: Operation Weserübung: Germany invades Denmark and Norway.
- 1940 – Vidkun Quisling seizes power in Norway.
- 1942 – World War II: The Battle of Bataan ends and the Bataan Death March begins.
- 1942 – World War II: An Indian Ocean raid by Japan's 1st Air Fleet sinks the British aircraft carrier HMS Hermes and the Australian destroyer HMAS Vampire.
- 1945 – Dietrich Bonhoeffer, Lutheran pastor and anti-Nazi dissident, is executed by the Nazi regime.
- 1945 – World War II: The German heavy cruiser Admiral Scheer is sunk by the Royal Air Force.
- 1945 – World War II: The Battle of Königsberg, in East Prussia, ends.
- 1945 – The United States Atomic Energy Commission is formed.
- 1946 – About 500 postal workers in Tel Aviv and Jaffa went on strike.
- 1947 – The Glazier–Higgins–Woodward tornadoes kill 181 and injure 970 in Texas, Oklahoma, and Kansas.
- 1947 – The Journey of Reconciliation, the first interracial Freedom Ride begins through the upper South in violation of Jim Crow laws. The riders wanted enforcement of the United States Supreme Court's 1946 Irene Morgan decision that banned racial segregation in interstate travel.
- 1947 – United Nations Security Council Resolution 22 relating to Corfu Channel incident is adopted.
- 1948 – Jorge Eliécer Gaitán's assassination provokes a violent riot in Bogotá (the Bogotazo), and a further ten years of violence in Colombia.
- 1948 – Fighters from the Irgun and Lehi Zionist terror groups attacked Deir Yassin near Jerusalem, killing over 100 Palestinians.
- 1952 – Hugo Ballivián's government is overthrown by the Bolivian National Revolution, starting a period of agrarian reform, universal suffrage and the nationalization of tin mines
- 1952 – Japan Air Lines Flight 301 crashes into Mount Mihara, Izu Ōshima, Japan, killing 37.
- 1957 – The Suez Canal in Egypt is cleared and opens to shipping following the Suez Crisis.
- 1959 – Project Mercury: NASA announces the selection of the United States' first seven astronauts, whom the news media quickly dub the "Mercury Seven".
- 1960 – Dr. Hendrik Verwoerd, Prime Minister of South Africa and architect of apartheid, narrowly survives an assassination attempt by a white farmer, David Pratt in Johannesburg.
- 1967 – The first Boeing 737 (a 100 series) makes its maiden flight.
- 1969 – The first British-built Concorde 002 makes its maiden flight from Filton to RAF Fairford with Brian Trubshaw as the test pilot.
- 1980 – The Iraqi regime of Saddam Hussein kills philosopher Muhammad Baqir al-Sadr and his sister Bint al-Huda after three days of torture.
- 1981 – The U.S. Navy nuclear submarine USS George Washington accidentally collides with the Nissho Maru, a Japanese cargo ship, sinking it and killing two Japanese sailors.
- 1989 – Tbilisi massacre: An anti-Soviet peaceful demonstration and hunger strike in Tbilisi, demanding restoration of Georgian independence, is dispersed by the Soviet Army, resulting in 20 deaths and hundreds of injuries.
- 1990 – An IRA bombing in County Down, Northern Ireland, kills three members of the UDR.
- 1990 – The Sahtu Dene and Metis Comprehensive Land Claim Agreement is signed for 180,000 square kilometres (69,000 mi^{2}) in the Mackenzie Valley of the western Arctic.
- 1990 – An Embraer EMB 120 Brasilia collides in mid-air with a Cessna 172 over Gadsden, Alabama, killing both of the Cessna's occupants.
- 1991 – Georgia declares independence from the Soviet Union.
- 1992 – A U.S. Federal Court finds former Panamanian dictator Manuel Noriega guilty of drug and racketeering charges. He is sentenced to 30 years in prison.
- 1994 – Space Shuttle program: Space Shuttle Endeavour is launched on STS-59.
- 2003 – Iraq War: Baghdad falls to American forces.
- 2009 – In Tbilisi, Georgia, up to 60,000 people protest against the government of Mikheil Saakashvili.
- 2011 – Six people and the perpetrator are killed and 17 injured in a mass shooting at a shopping mall in Alphen aan den Rijn, Netherlands.
- 2013 – A 6.1–magnitude earthquake strikes Iran killing 32 people and injuring over 850 people.
- 2013 – At least 13 people are killed and another three injured after a man goes on a spree shooting in the Serbian village of Velika Ivanča.
- 2014 – A student stabs 20 people at Franklin Regional High School in Murrysville, Pennsylvania.
- 2017 – The Palm Sunday church bombings at Coptic churches in Tanta and Alexandria, Egypt, take place.
- 2020 – Soyuz MS-16 is launched from the Baikonur Cosmodrome, carrying the Expedition 62/63 crew to the International Space Station.
- 2021 – Burmese military and security forces commit the Bago massacre, during which at least 82 civilians are killed.
- 2021 – Soyuz MS-18 is launched from the Baikonur Cosmodrome, carrying three members of the Expedition 64 crew to the International Space Station.

== Births ==
=== Pre-1600 ===
- 1096 – Al-Muqtafi, caliph of the Abbasid Caliphate (died 1160)
- 1285 – Ayurbarwada Buyantu Khan, Emperor Renzong of Yuan (died 1320)
- 1458 – Camilla Battista da Varano, Italian saint (died 1524)
- 1498 – Jean, Cardinal of Lorraine (died 1550)
- 1586 – Julius Henry, Duke of Saxe-Lauenburg (died 1665)
- 1597 – John Davenport, English minister, co-founded the New Haven Colony (died 1670)
- 1598 – Johann Crüger, Sorbian-German composer and theorist (died 1662)

=== 1601–1900 ===
- 1624 – Henrik Rysensteen, Dutch military engineer (died 1679)
- 1627 – Johann Caspar Kerll, German organist and composer (died 1693)
- 1634 – Countess Albertine Agnes of Nassau (died 1696)
- 1648 – Henri de Massue, Earl of Galway, French soldier and diplomat (died 1720)
- 1649 – James Scott, 1st Duke of Monmouth, English general and politician, Lord Lieutenant of Staffordshire (died 1685)
- 1654 – Samuel Fritz, Czech Jesuit missionary to South America (died 1725?)
- 1680 – Philippe Néricault Destouches, French playwright (died 1754)
- 1686 – James Craggs the Younger, English politician, Secretary of State for the Southern Department (died 1721)
- 1691 – Johann Matthias Gesner, German scholar and academic (died 1761)
- 1717 – Georg Matthias Monn, Austrian organist, composer, and educator (died 1750)
- 1770 – Thomas Johann Seebeck, German physicist and academic (died 1831)
- 1773 – Étienne Aignan, French author and academic (died 1824)
- 1794 – Theobald Boehm, German flute player and composer (died 1881)
- 1794 – Søren Christian Sommerfelt, Norwegian priest and botanist (died 1838)
- 1802 – Elias Lönnrot, Finnish physician and philologist (died 1884)
- 1806 – Isambard Kingdom Brunel, English engineer, designed the Clifton Suspension Bridge (died 1859)
- 1807 – James Bannerman, Scottish theologian and academic (died 1868)
- 1821 – Charles Baudelaire, French poet and critic (died 1867)
- 1830 – Eadweard Muybridge, English photographer and cinematographer (died 1904)
- 1835 – Leopold II of Belgium (died 1909)
- 1835 – Somerset Lowry-Corry, 4th Earl Belmore (died 1913)
- 1846 – Paolo Tosti, Italian-English composer and educator (died 1916)
- 1848 – Ezequiél Moreno y Díaz, Spanish Augustinian Recollect priest and saint (died 1906)
- 1865 – Erich Ludendorff, German general and politician (died 1937)
- 1865 – Charles Proteus Steinmetz, Polish-American mathematician and engineer (died 1923)
- 1867 – Chris Watson, Chilean-Australian journalist and politician, 3rd Prime Minister of Australia (died 1941)
- 1867 – Charles Winckler, Danish tug of war competitor, discus thrower, and shot putter (died 1932)
- 1872 – Léon Blum, French lawyer and politician, Prime Minister of France (died 1950)
- 1875 – Jacques Futrelle, American journalist and author (died 1912)
- 1880 – Jan Letzel, Czech architect (died 1925)
- 1882 – Frederick Francis IV, Grand Duke of Mecklenburg-Schwerin (died 1946)
- 1882 – Otz Tollen, German actor (died 1965)
- 1883 – Frank King, American cartoonist (died 1969)
- 1887 – Konrad Tom, Polish actor, writer, singer, and director (died 1957)
- 1888 – Sol Hurok, Ukrainian-American talent manager (died 1974)
- 1893 – Charles E. Burchfield, American painter (died 1967)
- 1893 – Victor Gollancz, English publisher, founded Victor Gollancz Ltd (died 1967)
- 1893 – Rahul Sankrityayan, Indian linguist, author, and scholar (died 1963)
- 1895 – Mance Lipscomb, American singer-songwriter and guitarist (died 1976)
- 1895 – Michel Simon, Swiss-French actor (died 1975)
- 1897 – John B. Gambling, American radio host (died 1974)
- 1898 – Curly Lambeau, American football player and coach (died 1965)
- 1898 – Paul Robeson, American singer, actor, and activist (died 1976)
- 1900 – Allen Jenkins, American actor and singer (died 1974)

=== 1901–present ===
- 1901 – Jean Bruchési, Canadian historian and author (died 1979)
- 1901 – Paul Willis, American actor and director (died 1960)
- 1902 – Théodore Monod, French explorer and scholar (died 2000)
- 1903 – Ward Bond, American actor (died 1960)
- 1904 – Sharkey Bonano, American singer, trumpet player, and bandleader (died 1972)
- 1905 – J. William Fulbright, American lawyer and politician (died 1995)
- 1906 – Rafaela Aparicio, Spanish actress (died 1996)
- 1906 – Antal Doráti, Hungarian-American conductor and composer (died 1988)
- 1906 – Hugh Gaitskell, British politician and leader of the Labour Party (died 1963)
- 1906 – Victor Vasarely, Hungarian-French painter (died 1997)
- 1908 – Joseph Krumgold, American author and screenwriter (died 1980)
- 1908 – Paula Nenette Pepin, French composer, pianist and lyricist (died 1990)
- 1909 – Robert Helpmann, Australian dancer, actor, and choreographer (died 1986)
- 1910 – Abraham A. Ribicoff, American lawyer and politician, 4th United States Secretary of Health and Human Services (died 1998)
- 1912 – Lev Kopelev, Ukrainian-German author and academic (died 1997)
- 1915 – Daniel Johnson Sr., Canadian lawyer and politician, 20th Premier of Quebec (died 1968)
- 1916 – Julian Dash, American swing music jazz tenor saxophonist (died 1974)
- 1916 – Heinz Meyer, German Fallschirmjäger (paratrooper) during World War II (died 1987)
- 1916 – Bill Leonard, American journalist (died 1994)
- 1917 – Johannes Bobrowski, German songwriter and poet (died 1965)
- 1917 – Ronnie Burgess, Welsh international footballer and manager (died 2005)
- 1917 – Brad Dexter, American actor (died 2002)
- 1917 – Henry Hewes, American theater writer (died 2006)
- 1918 – Jørn Utzon, Danish architect, designed the Sydney Opera House (died 2008)
- 1919 – J. Presper Eckert, American engineer, invented the ENIAC (died 1995)
- 1921 – Jean-Marie Balestre, French businessman (died 2008)
- 1921 – Yitzhak Navon, Israeli politician (died 2015)
- 1921 – Frankie Thomas, American actor (died 2006)
- 1921 – Mary Jackson, African-American mathematician and aerospace engineer (died 2005)
- 1922 – Carl Amery, German author and activist (died 2005)
- 1923 – Leonard Levy, American historian and author (died 2006)
- 1924 – Arthur Shaw, English professional footballer (died 2015)
- 1925 – Virginia Gibson, American actress, singer, and dancer (died 2013)
- 1925 – Art Kane, American photographer (died 1995)
- 1926 – Gerry Fitt, Northern Irish soldier and politician; British life peer (died 2005)
- 1926 – Hugh Hefner, American publisher, founded Playboy Enterprises (died 2017)
- 1926 – Harris Wofford, American politician, author, and civil rights activist (died 2019)
- 1927 – Tiny Hill, New Zealand rugby player (died 2019)
- 1928 – Paul Arizin, American basketball player (died 2006)
- 1928 – Tom Lehrer, American singer-songwriter, pianist, and mathematician (died 2025)
- 1929 – Sharan Rani Backliwal, Indian sarod player and scholar (died 2008)
- 1929 – Fred Hollows, New Zealand-Australian ophthalmologist (died 1993)
- 1929 – Paule Marshall, American author and academic (died 2019)
- 1930 – Nathaniel Branden, Canadian-American psychotherapist and author (died 2014)
- 1930 – F. Albert Cotton, American chemist and academic (died 2007)
- 1930 – Jim Fowler, American zoologist and television host (died 2019)
- 1930 – Wallace McCain, Canadian businessman, founded McCain Foods (died 2011)
- 1931 – Richard Hatfield, Canadian lawyer and politician, 26th Premier of New Brunswick (died 1991)
- 1932 – Armin Jordan, Swiss conductor (died 2006)
- 1932 – Peter Moores, English businessman and philanthropist (died 2016)
- 1932 – Carl Perkins, American singer-songwriter and guitarist (died 1998)
- 1933 – Jean-Paul Belmondo, French actor and producer (died 2021)
- 1933 – René Burri, Swiss photographer and journalist (died 2014)
- 1933 – Fern Michaels, American author (died 2025)
- 1933 – Richard Rose, American political scientist and academic
- 1933 – Gian Maria Volonté, Italian actor (died 1994)
- 1934 – Bill Birch, New Zealand surveyor and politician, 38th New Zealand Minister of Finance
- 1934 – Tom Phillis, Australian motorcycle racer (died 1962)
- 1934 – Mariya Pisareva, Russian high jumper (died 2023)
- 1935 – Aulis Sallinen, Finnish composer and academic
- 1935 – Avery Schreiber, American actor and comedian (died 2002)
- 1936 – Jerzy Maksymiuk, Polish pianist, composer, and conductor
- 1936 – Drew Shafer, American LGBT rights activist from Missouri (died 1989)
- 1936 – Valerie Solanas, American radical feminist author, attempted murderer (died 1988)
- 1937 – Simon Brown, Baron Brown of Eaton-under-Heywood, English lieutenant, lawyer, and judge (died 2023)
- 1937 – Marty Krofft, Canadian screenwriter and producer (died 2023)
- 1937 – Valerie Singleton, English television and radio host
- 1938 – Viktor Chernomyrdin, Russian businessman and politician, 30th Prime Minister of Russia (died 2010)
- 1939 – Michael Learned, American actress
- 1939 – Margo Smith, American singer-songwriter (died 2024)
- 1940 – Hans-Joachim Reske, German sprinter
- 1940 – Jim Roberts, Canadian-American ice hockey player and coach (died 2015)
- 1941 – Kay Adams, American singer-songwriter
- 1941 – Hannah Gordon, Scottish actress
- 1942 – Brandon deWilde, American actor (died 1972)
- 1943 – Leila Khaled, Palestinian activist
- 1943 – Terry Knight, American singer-songwriter and producer (died 2004)
- 1943 – Clive Sullivan, Welsh rugby league player (died 1985)
- 1944 – Joe Brinkman, American baseball player and umpire
- 1944 – Heinz-Joachim Rothenburg, German shot putter
- 1945 – Steve Gadd, American drummer and percussionist
- 1946 – Nate Colbert, American baseball player (died 2023)
- 1946 – Alan Knott, English cricketer
- 1946 – Sara Parkin, Scottish activist and politician
- 1946 – David Webb, English footballer, coach, and manager
- 1947 – Giovanni Andrea Cornia, Italian economist and academic (died 2024)
- 1948 – Jaya Bachchan, Indian actress and politician
- 1948 – Tito Gómez, Puerto Rican salsa singer (died 2007)
- 1948 – Michel Parizeau, Canadian ice hockey player and coach
- 1948 – Patty Pravo, Italian singer
- 1949 – Tony Cragg, English sculptor
- 1952 – Robert Clark, American author
- 1952 – Bruce Robertson, New Zealand rugby player (died 2023)
- 1952 – Tania Tsanaklidou, Greek singer and actress
- 1953 – John Howard, English singer-songwriter and pianist
- 1953 – Hal Ketchum, American singer-songwriter and guitarist (died 2020)
- 1953 – Stephen Paddock, American mass murderer responsible for the 2017 Las Vegas shooting (died 2017)
- 1954 – Ken Kalfus, American journalist and author
- 1954 – Dennis Quaid, American actor
- 1954 – Iain Duncan Smith, British soldier and politician, Secretary of State for Work and Pensions
- 1955 – Yamina Benguigui, Algerian-French director and politician
- 1955 – Joolz Denby, English poet and author
- 1956 – Miguel Ángel Russo, Argentine footballer and coach (died 2025)
- 1956 – Nigel Shadbolt, English computer scientist and academic
- 1956 – Marina Zoueva, Russian ice dancer and coach
- 1956 – Nigel Slater, English food writer and author
- 1957 – Seve Ballesteros, Spanish golfer and architect (died 2011)
- 1957 – Martin Margiela, Belgian fashion designer
- 1957 – Jamie Redfern, English-born Australian television presenter and pop singer
- 1958 – Nadey Hakim, British-Lebanese surgeon and sculptor
- 1958 – Tony Sibson, English boxer
- 1959 – Bernard Jenkin, English businessman and politician, Shadow Secretary of State for Defence
- 1960 – Jaak Aab, Estonian educator and politician, Minister of Social Affairs of Estonia
- 1961 – Mark Kelly, Irish keyboard player
- 1961 – Kirk McCaskill, Canadian-American baseball and hockey player
- 1962 – John Eaves, American production designer and illustrator
- 1962 – Ihor Podolchak, Ukrainian director, producer, and screenwriter
- 1962 – Imran Sherwani, English field hockey player (died 2025)
- 1962 – Jeff Turner, American basketball player, coach, and sportscaster
- 1963 – Marc Jacobs, American-French fashion designer
- 1963 – Joe Scarborough, American journalist, lawyer, and politician
- 1964 – Rob Awalt, German-American football player
- 1964 – Juliet Cuthbert, Jamaican sprinter
- 1964 – Doug Ducey, American politician and businessman, 23rd Governor of Arizona
- 1964 – Peter Penashue, Canadian businessman and politician, 9th Canadian Minister of Intergovernmental Affairs
- 1964 – Margaret Peterson Haddix, American author
- 1964 – Rick Tocchet, Canadian-American ice hockey player and coach
- 1965 – Helen Alfredsson, Swedish golfer
- 1965 – Paulina Porizkova, Czech-born Swedish-American model and actress
- 1965 – Jeff Zucker, American businessman
- 1965 – Mark Pellegrino, American actor
- 1966 – John Hammond, English weather forecaster
- 1966 – Cynthia Nixon, American actress
- 1967 – Natascha Engel, German-English translator and politician
- 1967 – Sam Harris, American author, philosopher, and neuroscientist
- 1968 – Jay Chandrasekhar, American actor, comedian, writer and director
- 1969 – Barnaby Kay, English actor
- 1969 – Linda Kisabaka, German runner
- 1970 – Chorão, Brazilian singer-songwriter (died 2013)
- 1971 – Peter Canavan, Irish footballer and manager
- 1971 – Leo Fortune-West, English footballer and manager
- 1971 – Austin Peck, American actor
- 1971 – Jacques Villeneuve, Canadian race car driver
- 1972 – Bernard Ackah, German-Japanese martial artist and kick-boxer
- 1972 – Siiri Vallner, Estonian architect
- 1974 – Megan Connolly, Australian actress (died 2001)
- 1974 – Jenna Jameson, American actress and pornographic performer
- 1974 – Alexander Pichushkin, Russian serial killer
- 1975 – Robbie Fowler, English footballer and manager
- 1975 – David Gordon Green, American director and screenwriter
- 1976 – Kyle Peterson, American baseball player and sportscaster
- 1977 – Gerard Way, American singer-songwriter and comic book writer
- 1978 – Kousei Amano, Japanese actor
- 1978 – Jorge Andrade, Portuguese footballer
- 1978 – Rachel Stevens, English singer-songwriter, dancer, and actress
- 1979 – Jeff Reed, American football player
- 1979 – Keshia Knight Pulliam, American actress
- 1980 – Sarah Ayton, English sailor
- 1980 – Luciano Galletti, Argentinian footballer
- 1980 – Albert Hammond Jr., American singer-songwriter and guitarist
- 1981 – Milan Bartovič, Slovak ice hockey player
- 1981 – A. J. Ellis, American baseball player
- 1981 – Ireneusz Jeleń, Polish footballer
- 1981 – Dennis Sarfate, American baseball player
- 1981 – Eric Harris, American mass murderer, responsible for the Columbine High School massacre (died 1999)
- 1982 – Jay Baruchel, Canadian actor
- 1982 – Carlos Hernández, Costa Rican footballer
- 1982 – Kathleen Munroe, Canadian-American actress
- 1983 – Ryan Clark, Australian actor
- 1984 – Habiba Ghribi, Tunisian runner
- 1984 – Adam Loewen, Canadian baseball player
- 1984 – Óscar Razo, Mexican footballer
- 1985 – Antonio Nocerino, Italian footballer
- 1985 – David Robertson, American baseball player
- 1986 – Mike Hart, American football player
- 1986 – Leighton Meester, American actress
- 1987 – Kassim Abdallah, French-Comorian footballer
- 1987 – Graham Gano, American football player
- 1987 – Craig Mabbitt, American singer
- 1987 – Jesse McCartney, American singer-songwriter and actor
- 1987 – Jarrod Mullen, Australian rugby league player
- 1987 – Jazmine Sullivan, American singer-songwriter
- 1988 – Jeremy Metcalfe, English race car driver
- 1989 – Bianca Belair, American wrestler
- 1989 – Danielle Kahle, American figure skater
- 1990 – Kristen Stewart, American actress
- 1990 – Ryan Williams, American football player
- 1991 – Gai Assulin, Israeli footballer
- 1991 – Ryan Kelly, American basketball player
- 1991 – Mary Killman, American synchronized swimmer
- 1992 – Raheem Mostert, American football player
- 1993 – Alexandra Hunt, American politician
- 1994 – Bladee, Swedish rapper and singer
- 1994 – Joey Pollari, American actor
- 1995 – Domagoj Bošnjak, Croatian basketball player
- 1995 – Robert Bauer, German-Kazakhstani footballer
- 1995 – Demi Vermeulen, Dutch Paralympic equestrian
- 1996 – Jayden Brailey, Australian rugby league player
- 1996 – Giovani Lo Celso, Argentine footballer
- 1997 – Luis Arráez, Venezuelan baseball player
- 1998 – Elle Fanning, American actress
- 1999 – Stanley Nsoki, French footballer
- 1999 – Lil Nas X, American rapper
- 1999 – Rúben Vinagre, Portuguese footballer
- 2000 – Tiago Djaló, Portuguese footballer
- 2000 – Jackie Evancho, American singer
- 2001 – Nika Mühl, Croatian basketball player
- 2003 – Hwang Do-yun, South Korean footballer
- 2004 – TommyInnit, English YouTuber and streamer

== Deaths ==
=== Pre-1600 ===
- 585 BC – Jimmu, emperor of Japan (born 711 BC)
- 436 – Tan Daoji, Chinese general and politician
- 491 – Zeno, emperor of the Byzantine Empire (born 425)
- 682 – Maslama ibn Mukhallad al-Ansari, Egyptian politician, Governor of Egypt (born 616)
- 715 – Constantine, pope of the Catholic Church (born 664)
- 1024 – Benedict VIII, pope of the Catholic Church (born 980)
- 1137 – William X, duke of Aquitaine (born 1099)
- 1241 – Henry II, High Duke of Poland (born 1196)
- 1283 – Margaret of Scotland, queen of Norway (born 1261)
- 1327 – Walter Stewart, 6th High Steward of Scotland, Scottish nobleman (ca. 1296)
- 1483 – Edward IV, king of England (born 1442)
- 1484 – Edward of Middleheim, prince of Wales (born 1473)
- 1550 – Alqas Mirza, Safavid prince (born 1516)
- 1553 – François Rabelais, French monk and scholar (born 1494)
- 1557 – Mikael Agricola, Finnish priest and scholar (born 1510)
- 1561 – Jean Quintin, French priest, knight and writer (born 1500)

=== 1601–1900 ===
- 1626 – Francis Bacon, English jurist and politician, Attorney General for England and Wales (born 1561)
- 1654 – Matei Basarab, Romanian prince (born 1588)
- 1693 – Roger de Rabutin, Comte de Bussy, French author (born 1618)
- 1747 – Simon Fraser, 11th Lord Lovat, Scottish soldier and politician (born 1667)
- 1754 – Christian Wolff, German philosopher and academic (born 1679)
- 1761 – William Law, English priest and theologian (born 1686)
- 1768 – Sarah Fielding, English author (born 1710)
- 1804 – Jacques Necker, Swiss-French politician, Chief Minister to the French Monarch (born 1732)
- 1806 – William V, stadtholder of the Dutch Republic (born 1748)
- 1872 – Erastus Corning, American businessman and politician (born 1794)
- 1876 – Charles Goodyear, American lawyer, judge, and politician (born 1804)
- 1882 – Dante Gabriel Rossetti, English poet and painter (born 1828)
- 1889 – Michel Eugène Chevreul, French chemist and academic (born 1786)

=== 1901–present ===
- 1904 – Isabella II, Spanish queen (born 1830)
- 1909 – Helena Modjeska, Polish-American actress (born 1840)
- 1915 – Raymond Whittindale, English rugby player (born 1883)
- 1917 – James Hope Moulton, English philologist and scholar (born 1863)
- 1922 – Hans Fruhstorfer, German entomologist and explorer (born 1866)
- 1926 – Zip the Pinhead, American freak show performer (born 1857)
- 1936 – Ferdinand Tönnies, German sociologist and philosopher (born 1855)
- 1940 – Mrs Patrick Campbell, English actress (born 1865)
- 1944 – Yevgeniya Rudneva, Ukrainian lieutenant and pilot (born 1920)
- 1945 – Dietrich Bonhoeffer, German pastor and theologian (born 1906)
- 1945 – Wilhelm Canaris, German admiral (born 1887)
- 1945 – Johann Georg Elser, German carpenter (born 1903)
- 1945 – Hans Oster, German general (born 1887)
- 1945 – Karl Sack, German lawyer and jurist (born 1896)
- 1945 – Hans von Dohnányi, Austrian-German lawyer and jurist (born 1902)
- 1948 – George Carpenter, Australian 5th General of The Salvation Army (born 1872)
- 1948 – Jorge Eliécer Gaitán, Colombian lawyer and politician, 16th Colombian Minister of National Education (born 1903)
- 1951 – Vilhelm Bjerknes, Norwegian physicist and meteorologist (born 1862)
- 1953 – Eddie Cochems, American football player and coach (born 1877)
- 1953 – C. E. M. Joad, English philosopher and television host (born 1891)
- 1953 – Hans Reichenbach, German philosopher from the Vienna Circle (born 1891)
- 1959 – Frank Lloyd Wright, American architect, designed the Price Tower and Fallingwater (born 1867)
- 1961 – Zog I of Albania (born 1895)
- 1963 – Eddie Edwards, American trombonist (born 1891)
- 1963 – Xul Solar, Argentinian painter and sculptor (born 1887)
- 1970 – Gustaf Tenggren, Swedish-American illustrator and animator (born 1896)
- 1976 – Dagmar Nordstrom, American singer-songwriter and pianist (born 1903)
- 1976 – Phil Ochs, American singer-songwriter and guitarist (born 1940)
- 1976 – Renato Petronio, Italian rower (born 1891)
- 1978 – Clough Williams-Ellis, English-Welsh architect, designed Portmeirion (born 1883)
- 1980 – Muhammad Baqir al-Sadr, Iraqi cleric and philosopher (born 1935)
- 1982 – Wilfrid Pelletier, Canadian pianist, composer, and conductor (born 1896)
- 1988 – Brook Benton, American singer-songwriter and actor (born 1931)
- 1988 – Hans Berndt, German footballer (born 1913)
- 1988 – Dave Prater, American singer (born 1937)
- 1991 – Forrest Towns, American hurdler and coach (born 1914)
- 1993 – Joseph B. Soloveitchik, American rabbi and philosopher (born 1903)
- 1996 – Richard Condon, American author and publicist (born 1915)
- 1997 – Mae Boren Axton, American singer-songwriter (born 1914)
- 1997 – Helene Hanff, American author and screenwriter (born 1916)
- 1998 – Tom Cora, American cellist and composer (born 1953)
- 1999 – Ibrahim Baré Maïnassara, Nigerien general and politician, President of Niger (born 1949)
- 2000 – Tony Cliff, Trotskyist activist and founder of the Socialist Workers Party (born 1917)
- 2001 – Willie Stargell, American baseball player and coach (born 1940)
- 2002 – Pat Flaherty, American race car driver (born 1926)
- 2002 – Leopold Vietoris, Austrian soldier, mathematician, and academic (born 1891)
- 2003 – Jerry Bittle, American cartoonist (born 1949)
- 2006 – Billy Hitchcock, American baseball player, coach, manager (born 1916)
- 2006 – Vilgot Sjöman, Swedish director and screenwriter (born 1924)
- 2007 – Egon Bondy, Czech philosopher and poet (born 1930)
- 2007 – Dorrit Hoffleit, American astronomer and academic (born 1907)
- 2009 – Nick Adenhart, American baseball player (born 1986)
- 2010 – Zoltán Varga, Hungarian footballer and manager (born 1945)
- 2011 – Zakariya Rashid Hassan al-Ashiri, Bahraini journalist (born 1971)
- 2011 – Sidney Lumet, American director, producer, and screenwriter (born 1924)
- 2012 – Malcolm Thomas, Welsh rugby player and cricketer (born 1929)
- 2012 – Boris Parygin, Soviet philosopher, psychologist, and author (born 1930)
- 2013 – David Hayes, American sculptor and painter (born 1931)
- 2013 – Greg McCrary, American football player (born 1952)
- 2013 – Mordechai Mishani, Israeli lawyer and politician (born 1945)
- 2013 – McCandlish Phillips, American journalist and author (born 1927)
- 2013 – Paolo Soleri, Italian-American architect, designed the Cosanti (born 1919)
- 2014 – Gil Askey, American trumpet player, composer, and producer (born 1925)
- 2014 – Chris Banks, American football player (born 1973)
- 2014 – Rory Ellinger, American lawyer and politician (born 1941)
- 2014 – Norman Girvan, Jamaican economist, academic, and politician (born 1941)
- 2014 – Aelay Narendra, Indian politician (born 1946)
- 2014 – A. N. R. Robinson, Trinbagonian politician, 3rd President of Trinidad and Tobago (born 1926)
- 2014 – Svetlana Velmar-Janković, Serbian author (born 1933)
- 2015 – Paul Almond, Canadian-American director, producer, and screenwriter (born 1931)
- 2015 – Margaret Rule, British marine archaeologist (born 1928)
- 2015 – Nina Companeez, French director and screenwriter (born 1937)
- 2015 – Alexander Dalgarno, English physicist and academic (born 1928)
- 2015 – Ivan Doig, American journalist and author (born 1939)
- 2015 – Tsien Tsuen-hsuin, Chinese-American academic (born 1909)
- 2016 – Duane Clarridge, American spy (born 1932)
- 2016 – Will Smith, American football player (born 1981)
- 2017 – John Clarke, New Zealand-Australian comedian, writer, and satirist (born 1948)
- 2019 – Charles Van Doren, American writer and editor (born 1926)
- 2021 – Prince Philip, Duke of Edinburgh, Prince of the United Kingdom, Prince of Greece and Denmark, Consort of Queen Elizabeth II (born 1921)
- 2021 – DMX, American rapper and actor (born 1970)
- 2021 – Nikki Grahame, British reality-TV icon (born 1982)
- 2021 – Ian Gibson, British scientist and Labour Party politician (born 1938)
- 2021 – Ramsey Clark, American lawyer (born 1927)
- 2022 – Dwayne Haskins, American football player (born 1997)
- 2023 – Karl Berger, German-American jazz pianist (born 1935)
- 2025 – Ray Shero, American ice hockey player and executive (born 1962)

== Holidays and observances ==
- Christian feast day:
  - Acacius of Amida
  - Casilda of Toledo
  - Demetrius of Thessaloniki
  - Dietrich Bonhoeffer (Anglicanism, Lutheranism)
  - Gaucherius
  - Materiana
  - Blessed Thomas of Tolentino
  - Waltrude
  - April 9 (Eastern Orthodox liturgics)
- Baghdad Liberation Day (Iraqi Kurdistan)
- Constitution Day (Kosovo)
- Day of National Unity (Georgia)
- Day of Valor or Araw ng Kagitingan (Philippines)
- Feast of the Second Day of the Writing of the Book of the Law (Thelema)
- Martyr's Day (Tunisia)
- Mikael Agricola Day, also known as Day of the Finnish Language (Finland)
- National Former Prisoner of War Recognition Day (United States)
- Remembrance for Haakon Sigurdsson (The Troth)
- Vimy Ridge Day (Canada)
- Valour Day (CRPF)
