= Northwest Orient Airlines Flight 307 =

1950 aviation accident

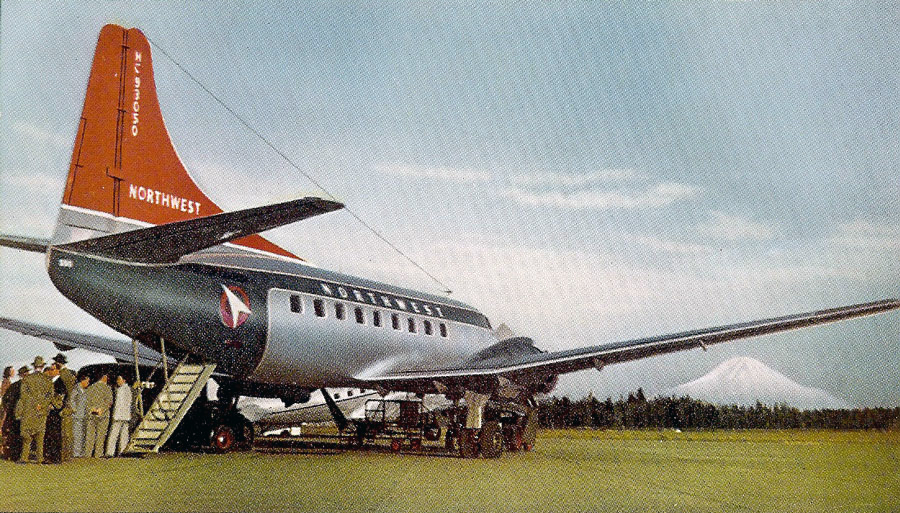
- The accident aircraft on a vintage Northwest Orient Airlines postcard

Accident
- Date: March 7, 1950
- Summary: Struck obstacle during landing approach, crashed into house
- Site: Lynnhurst, near Minneapolis-Saint Paul International Airport, Minneapolis, Minnesota, United States; 44°54′32.6916″N 93°17′39.2094″W
- Total fatalities: 15

Aircraft
- Aircraft type: Martin 2-0-2
- Operator: Northwest Orient Airlines
- Registration: N93050
- Flight origin: Washington National Airport, Washington, D.C.
- 1st stopover: Pittsburgh International Airport, Pittsburgh, Pennsylvania
- 2nd stopover: Cleveland International Airport, Cleveland, Ohio
- 3rd stopover: Detroit Metropolitan Airport, Detroit, Michigan
- 4th stopover: Dane County Regional Airport, Madison, Wisconsin
- Last stopover: Minneapolis-Saint Paul International Airport, Minneapolis, Minnesota
- Destination: Stevenson Field, Winnipeg, Manitoba, Canada
- Occupants: 13
- Passengers: 10
- Crew: 3
- Fatalities: 13
- Survivors: 0

Ground casualties
- Ground fatalities: 2
- Ground injuries: 3

Northwest Orient Airlines Flight 307 was a scheduled international flight with several domestic legs in the United States with the routing Washington, DC–Pittsburgh-Cleveland-Detroit–Madison–Rochester–Minneapolis-St. Paul–Winnipeg. On Tuesday, March 7, 1950, a Martin 2-0-2, registered N93050, was operating the flight when it collided with a flagpole at Fort Snelling National Cemetery on approach to Minneapolis-Saint Paul International Airport. During an attempt to make an emergency landing, a section of the left wing departed the aircraft, rendering it uncontrollable and causing it to crash into the Doughty family house in the Lynnhurst neighborhood of Minneapolis. All three crew members and ten passengers on board were killed, as were two children, Janet and Tom Doughty, and the family dog inside the house.

== Background ==
The aircraft was a Martin 2-0-2 twin-engined piston airliner designed to carry 42 passengers. It had been delivered new to Northwest Orient Airlines on May 6, 1948, as registration N93050. The aircraft had just received a 75-hour service check in Washington, D.C., prior to departure.

On that day, Flight 307 was crewed by Captain Donald B. Jones, co-pilot William Tracy McGinn, and stewardess Mary Kennedy. Captain Jones was employed by Northwest on April 8, 1940, starting as a first officer in November 1941, and becoming qualified for the captain position on February 1, 1943. He also served as a check pilot, giving trainings in Douglas DC-3s, DC-4s, and the Martin 2-0-2, with a total of 7,619 flight hours, 988 of which were in the Martin 2-0-2.

Co-pilot McGinn was hired by Northwest on July 19, 1943, as a first officer, but served in the armed forces from April 6, 1944, to May 23, 1946. After the war, he returned to Northwest and completed captain transition training, receiving an airline transport pilot rating in December 1949, three months before the accident. His total flight hours amounted to 2,432; again, 585 of which were in the Martin 2-0-2.

Both men had recently passed physical examination tests, and prior to departure from Washington, D.C., had a rest period of 21 hours and 52 minutes.

== Accident ==
Flight 307 took off from Washington, D.C., at 12:30 CST (18:30 UTC) on Tuesday, March 7, 1950, destined for Winnipeg, Manitoba, Canada, via Pittsburgh, Cleveland, Detroit, Madison, Rochester, and Minneapolis-Saint Paul. On board were 10 passengers and 1,799 lb (816 kg) of cargo.

The flight was delayed in Detroit by an hour and 23 minutes for a mandatory replacement of a ring seal in the hydraulic system, and departed for Madison with no issue. Upon arrival in Madison, the aircraft was serviced with 1,010 US gal (3,800 L; 840 imp gal) of fuel and 38 US gal (140 L; 32 imp gal) of oil. Shortly thereafter, Flight 307 departed for Minneapolis-Saint Paul International Airport, with a stop at Rochester being made optional, hinging upon weather conditions at the time of the flight's arrival. Indeed, when Flight 307 arrived over Rochester at 20:23 CST (02:23 UTC), it was unable to land due to light freezing rain, so the aircraft continued on toward the Twin Cities Airport in Minneapolis.

At 20:35 CST (02:35 UTC), Flight 307 reported over Stanton, Minnesota, the site of a radio beacon 30 mi (48 km) south of the Twin Cities airport, and six minutes later contacted Minneapolis Approach Control for landing clearance. The tower replied with weather conditions of a precipitation ceiling of 900 ft (270 m), variable visibility from 0.5 mi (0.80 km) to 0.75 mi (1.21 km), wind speeds from the north up to 27 mph (43 km/h) and gusts up to 40 mph (64 km/h). Additionally, the tower informed the flight of two previous electrical power failures at the airport within the past hour, and that if the flight received no further communication, they should assume that it had occurred again.

Flight 307 lined up to land on Runway 35 in the blinding snowstorm conditions. At 20:57 CST (02:57 UTC), the left wing hit a 70 ft (21 m) flagpole (44°51′56.6″N 93°13′20.2″W) about 4,180 ft (1,270 m) from the touchdown point and 650 ft (200 m) west of the approach centerline at the northern entrance of Fort Snelling National Cemetery. The impact sheared off the top of the flagpole and crippled the aircraft's left wing.

Captain Jones put the aircraft in a slight left turn that took it over the airport tower, and radioed in saying "I have got to get in." The tower gave Flight 307 clearance to land again, and Jones reported that he would climb to 2,400 ft (730 m) northwest of the airport.

Jones managed to pilot the stricken aircraft for about 3.8 mi (6.1 km), roughly following Minnehaha Creek. In the course of the climb, a 24.5 ft (7.5 m) section of the left wing detached and fell near the southern foot of the Washburn Park Water Tower in the Tangletown neighborhood (44°54′38″N 93°17′03.5″W). Due to asymmetric lift, the aircraft plummeted from an altitude of 300 ft (91 m). Jones had just enough time to inform the tower, "We are going in--we are going in."

The aircraft continued westerly for an additional 2,640 ft (800 m) before, at 21:02 CST (03:02 UTC), crashing almost vertically into the Doughty family house at 1116 Minnehaha Parkway West (44°54′32.69″N 93°17′39.21″W) in the Lynnhurst neighborhood of Minneapolis. The aircraft and house, plus two adjacent dwellings (1110 and 1120), were destroyed by fire, and two children, 10-year-old Janet Marie and 8-year-old Thomas Edwin "Tommy" Doughty, sleeping in their beds upstairs, were killed, along with the family dog.

Their 15-year-old sister, Diane (1934–2022), narrowly escaped with their parents; the three of them were in their living room watching a Minneapolis Lakers game, and they escaped by jumping out of a window into the front yard just before their house was consumed by the fire, suffering injuries from broken glass and burns. The family dog had jumped into Diane's lap just prior to the crash, and was unable to follow the three out of the house.

== Emergency response ==
Richfield police officer Floyd Roman was the first policeman on the scene, arriving seconds after the local fire department. Roman stated that as the inferno grew, "the plane from all the heat was melting down, and it disappeared entirely into the house."

Nearby, at the Boulevard Theater on South Lyndale Avenue, word had begun to spread that a possible plane crash had occurred. 17-year-old Dick Erdahl and two of his friends rushed to the site on foot, as emergency crews had to handle the fire as well as the diversion of traffic. Erdahl went home afterward, across Minnehaha Creek on Humboldt Avenue and later remarked, "I could see the fire from my bedroom window well into the night... If the plane had continued on its path another block or two, it could have landed on our house. That sticks in your mind."

== Probable cause ==
The probable cause of the crash was an attempt to complete an approach with a loss of visual reference to the ground. Additionally, another Northwest flight, operated by a much larger Boeing 377, had just taken off on Runway 35 prior to Flight 307's landing attempt. The 377 used full engine power to blow snow off of its wings, which may have contributed to the lack of visibility approaching the runway. This was not conclusively proven, however.

== Legacy ==
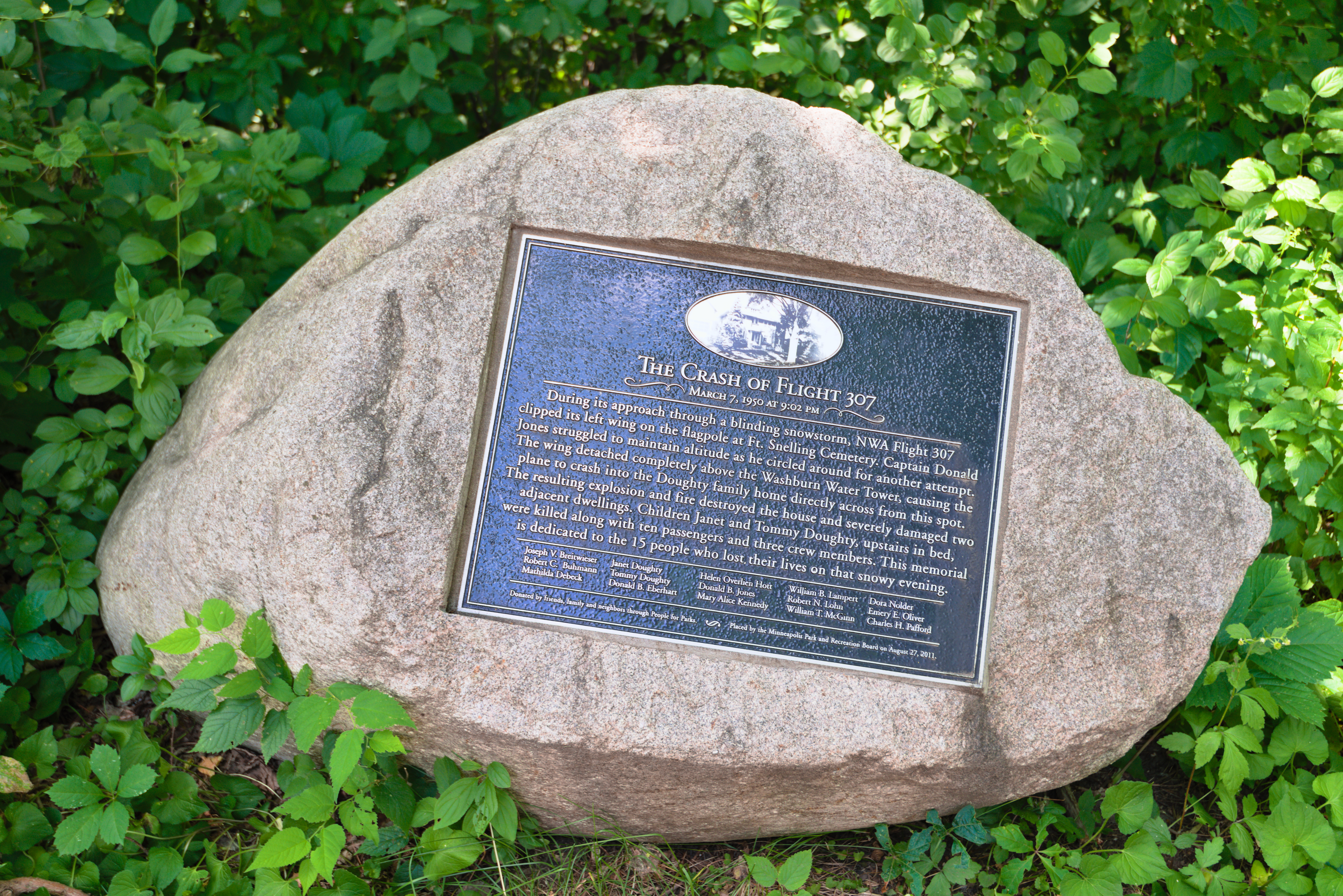
Memorial plaque

This would not be the only crash that Northwest saw in 1950; three and a half months later on June 23, Flight 2501 crashed into Lake Michigan with the loss of all 58 aboard, the deadliest commercial airliner accident in the country at the time, and as of 2026, neither wreckage nor remains of the occupants have been recovered.

This was also not the first time that a Northwest Martin 2-0-2 suffered an accident in the Minneapolis-Saint Paul metropolitan area; a little over a year and a half prior, on August 29, 1948, Flight 421, also flown by a 2-0-2, disintegrated in flight and crashed on approach to the Twin Cities Airport in Fountain City, Wisconsin, 4.1 mi (6.6 km) northwest of Winona, Minnesota. In total, between August 1948 and January 1951, five of Northwest's 25 Martin 2-0-2's suffered fatal accidents, with an overall death toll of 89. Subsequently, Northwest withdrew all 2-0-2s from service at midnight on March 17, 1951, ten days after the one-year-anniversary of the crash of Flight 307. The remaining twenty planes were sold or leased to local service airlines. Northwest never operated the Martin 2-0-2 again.

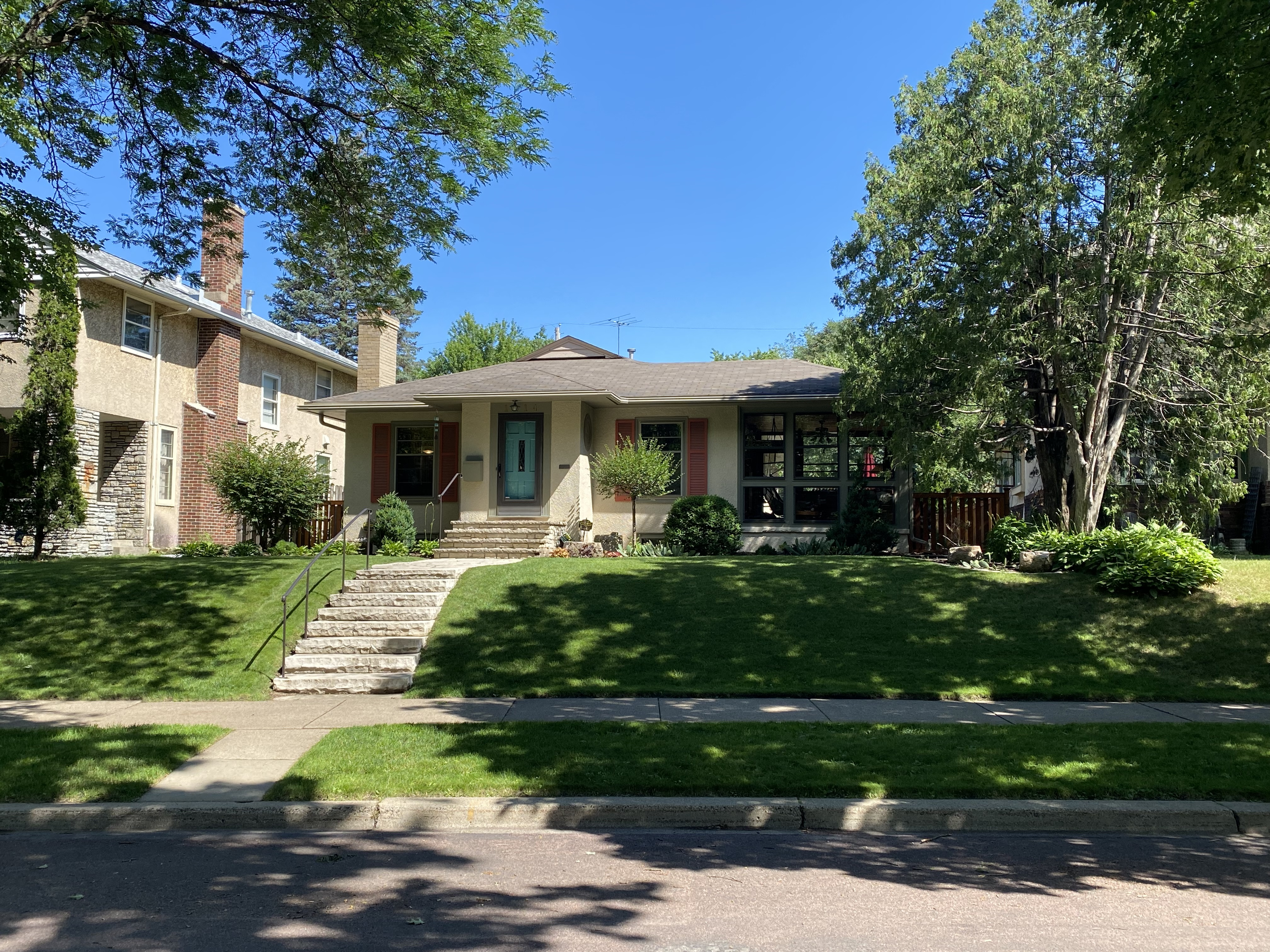
The crash site of Flight 307 in 2022

Former Minneapolis councilman Mark Kaplan, having moved to the Lynnhurst neighborhood and hearing of the tragedy through neighbors (many who were there that night), petitioned for a memorial for the victims of Flight 307, shortly after the dedication of a memorial to the victims of the 2007 collapse of the I-35W Mississippi River bridge. With help from surviving family members of the passengers and crew, he made a successful push for a memorial across the street from the site of the Doughty family home. Diane found the efforts to commemorate the tragedy were "wonderful". Raising $3,500 USD for a 2.5 t (5,500 lb) boulder and cast aluminum plaque, the memorial was formally dedicated on August 27, 2011, with Diane and surviving family members present. The address of the rebuilt house on the site of the Doughty family house was changed after the crash from 1116 to 1114 Minnehaha Parkway West.

As of 2026, the crash of Flight 307 is the most recent, and only, commercial aviation disaster within the Twin Cities limits.
