= Flight 512 =

Flight 512 may refer to:

- Transocean Air Lines Flight 512, crashed on 12 July 1953
- Eastern Air Lines Flight 512, crashed on 30 November 1962
- Air Lanka Flight 512, exploded on 3 May 1986
