= Flight 301 =

Flight 301 may refer to:

Listed chronologically

- Japan Air Lines Flight 301, crashed on 9 April 1952
- Canadian Pacific Air Lines Flight 301, crashed on 22 July 1962
- Turkish Airlines Flight 301, crashed on 26 January 1974
- Air India Flight 301, target of an attempted terrorist bombing on 23 June 1985
- CAAC Flight 301, crashed on 31 August 1988
- Palair Macedonian Airlines Flight 301, crashed on 5 March 1993
- Sakha Avia Flight 301, crashed on 26 August 1993
- Birgenair Flight 301, crashed on 6 February 1996
- Lloyd Aéreo Boliviano Flight 301, emergency landing on 1 February 2008
- Lao Airlines Flight 301, crashed on 16 October 2013
