= Transocean Air Lines Flight 942 =

1953 aviation accident

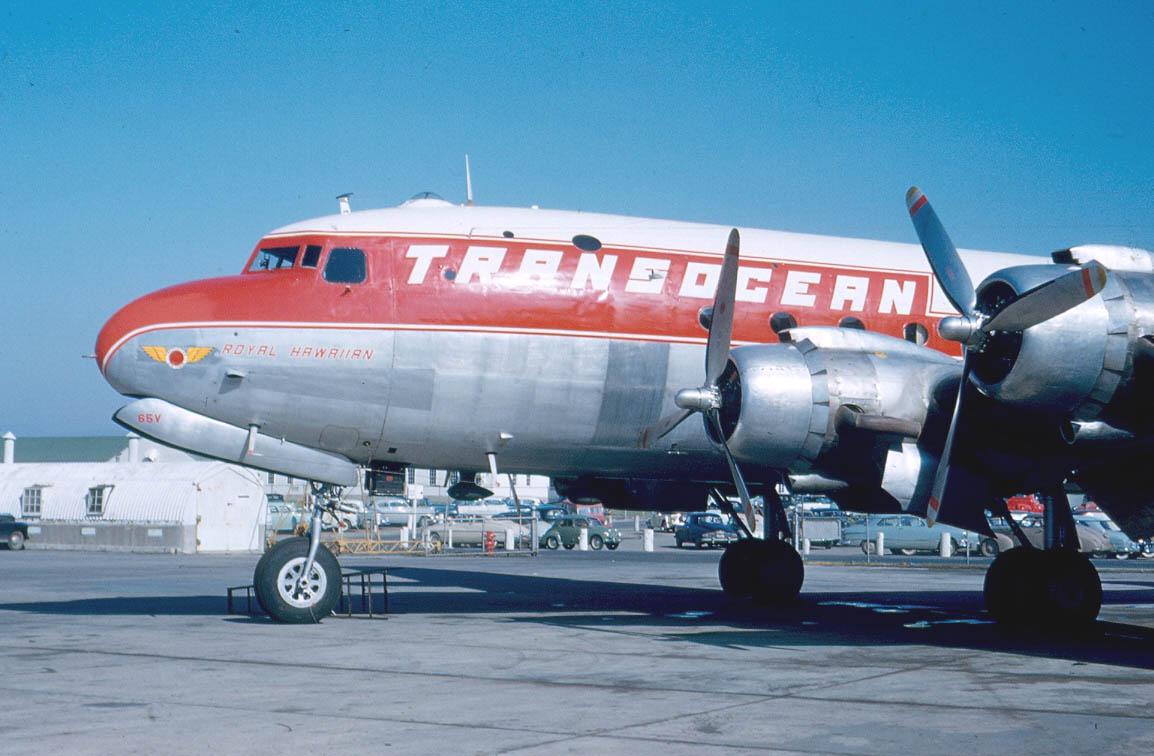
- A Transocean Air Lines Douglas DC-4, similar to the aircraft involved in the accident.

Accident
- Date: March 20, 1953
- Summary: Crashed due to loss of control
- Site: Oakland, California

Aircraft
- Aircraft type: Douglas DC-4
- Operator: Transocean Air Lines
- Registration: N88942
- Flight origin: Roswell, New Mexico
- Destination: Oakland, California
- Occupants: 35
- Passengers: 30
- Crew: 5
- Fatalities: 35
- Survivors: 0

Transocean Air Lines Flight 942 was a military charter flight operated by Transocean Air Lines. Soldiers commonly used Transocean aircraft for needed travel as they had a contract with the United States Department of Defense (DoD). The flight was chartered to transfer military personnel for a rotation from New Mexico to Guam. No weather problems were predicted, yet multiple weather systems were spotted in California. At 12:11 MST on March 20, 1953, the flight departed from Roswell, New Mexico, to Oakland, California. The flight was normal at first, but disappeared from radar at 18:36 PST. Two minutes later, the aircraft, a Douglas DC-4, crashed in a barley field in Oakland, California, killing all 35 occupants.

Rescue services attempted to transport the victims to hospitals, but delayed efforts due to poor road conditions in the area. Six survivors were rescued, but ultimately died at Fairmont Hospital. As there were no survivors, ambulances carried the bodies to the Parks Air Force Base for identification that continued beyond the clearing of the crash site. The Civil Aeronautics Board (CAB) commenced its investigation of the crash on March 21. Parts were arranged in a manner to replicate the aircraft. The investigation concluded that the probable crash reason was due to lack of control for unknown reasons; weather problems caused ice to form in the aircraft contributing to the crash.

== Background ==
The flight was chartered to transfer military personnel for a rotation under Transocean Air Lines' contract with the DoD, specifically the 509th Bombardment Wing, from Walker Air Force Base in New Mexico to the Andersen Air Force Base in Guam. Since aircraft used to fly personnel were unavailable, the wing chartered an aircraft to transport them. Transocean aircraft were commonly used by military teams. The 830th Bombardment Squadron was responsible for providing aircrew and aircraft, while other squadrons contributed to flight plans and passenger lists. The movement progressed until March 20, when more aircraft were planned to depart, including a C-97 and two DC-4s over the course of the day.

=== Aircraft, passengers, and crew ===
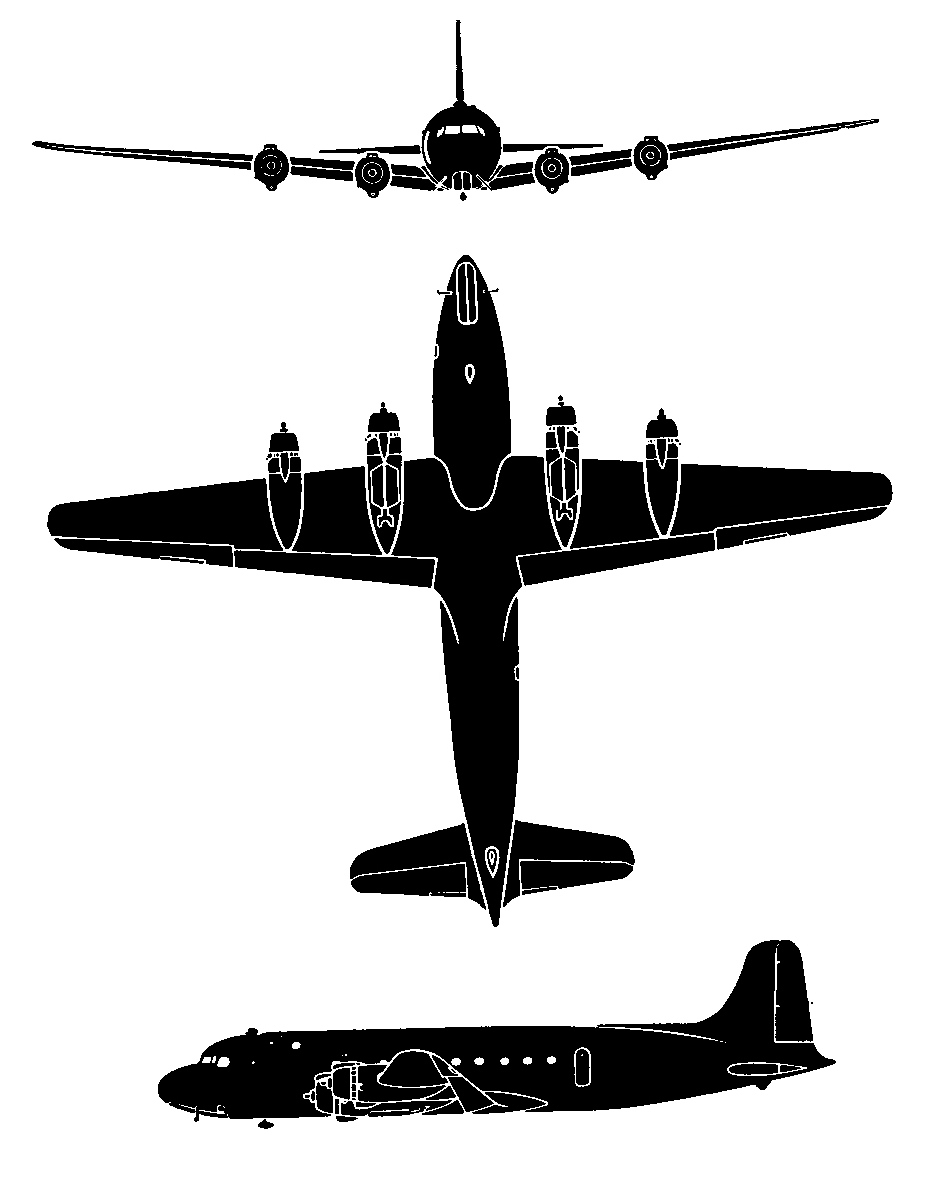
Douglas DC-4

The aircraft was a Douglas DC-4, with aircraft registration N88942; it had a total of 5,976 airframe hours. The aircraft was leased from the United States Air Force, operated by Transocean Air Lines through a contract with the Military Air Transport Service, and certificated by the Civil Aeronautics Authority (CAA). The aircraft was equipped with Pratt & Whitney R-2000-4 engines and Hamilton Standard propellers.

The flight carried 30 passengers, all soldiers, and five crew members, amounting to 35 occupants. The crew comprised Chief Pilot Harvey Rodgers, First Officer Frederick W. Patchett, Captain Herman E. Hum. Chief Rodgers had "considerable" flying experience according to the CAB; his associates added that he strictly adhered to airline regulations and recommended other crews do the same.

== Accident ==
Before departure, a Defense Visual Flight Rules plan was approved by the Air Route Traffic Control, indicating the flight should hover at an altitude of at least 500 feet (150 metres) in Red Airway 88 to Albuquerque, New Mexico; Green Airway 4 to Palmdale, California; Blue Airway 14 and Amber Airway 1 to Bakersfield, California; and Blue Airway 10 to Oakland, California. On the morning of the flight, a low-pressure center formed in southwestern Montana while a cold front was moving in an easterly direction at the southwestern portion of California. Other weather systems, including an occluded front, began moving to northwestern California. Although no severe weather was forecasted in the area near Oakland, the weather systems resulted in additional turbulence.

At 12:11 MST on March 20, 1953, the flight departed from Roswell, New Mexico, for Oakland, California. The trip was expected to take six hours and 35 minutes, with sufficient fuel for 10 hours. The weight of the aircraft at the time of takeoff was 63,817 pounds (28,947 kilograms), with an allowable gross weight of 73,000 lb (33,000 kg). After takeoff, the flight was routine. At 14:51 MST near Winslow, the aircraft changed to instrument flight rules. At 17:32 PST, the flight reported it was within the vicinity of Fresno, with an altitude of 8,000 feet (2,400 m). Subsequently, at 17:44 PST, still over Fresno, the flight reported to a local communications center it was at an altitude of 7,000 ft (2,100 m), descending from its previous altitude at 17:30 PST.

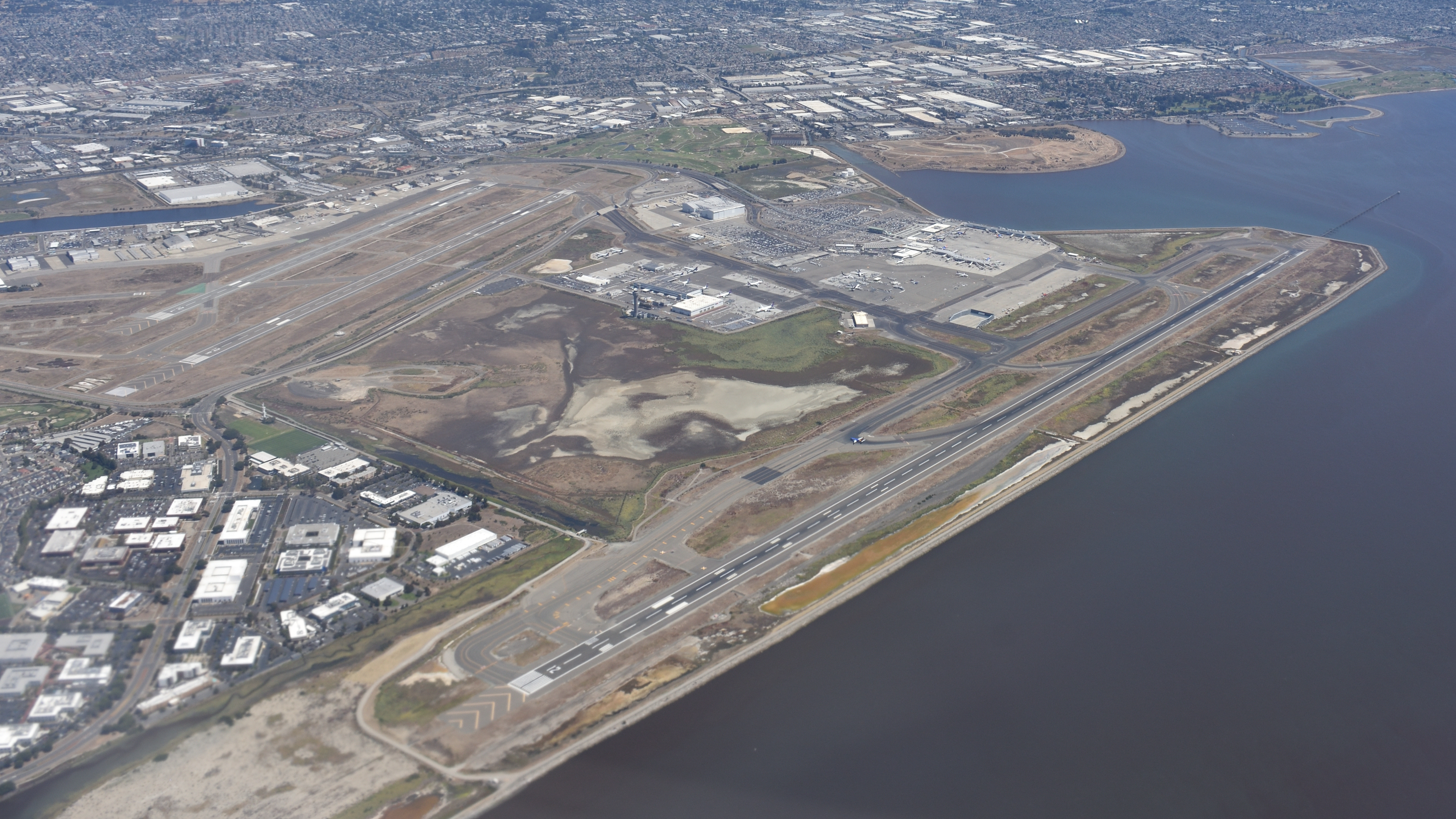
The Oakland San Francisco Bay Airport, where the aircraft was supposed to land.

Upon approaching Evergreen at 18:09 PST, the flight was told to maintain altitude at 8,000 ft (2,400 m) over Newark. The crew requested to descend to 7,000 ft (2,100 m) at 18:10 PST; the request was denied due to heavy air traffic at that altitude. The aircraft held its altitude for 11 minutes. Subsequently, the Oakland Approach Control cleared the flight for a straight-in range approach while descending in a holding pattern to cross the Newark compass locator at 3,500 ft (1,100 m). The approach control also told the flight crew to report descending each 1,000 ft (300 m). At 18:30 PST, the aircraft started descending and reached 3,500 ft (1,100 m) at 18:36 PST. This was the last known interaction with the aircraft before it crashed.

Two minutes later, at 18:38 PST, the aircraft was found to have crashed in a flat barley field 1.5 miles (2.4 kilometres) northeast of Alvarado. The Honolulu Star-Bulletin reported the aircraft crashed after being cleared for a landing at Oakland Airport. Eyewitnesses saw the aircraft crash into a hill in drizzling rain. Some witnesses saw ice chunks adhering to parts of the aircraft. The investigation showed it crashed on its right wingtip first, with a vertically inclined position. The aircraft flipped over multiple times and disintegrated. Debris was scattered over an 800 ft (240 m) long area and a 300 ft (91 m) wide area. The impact force as well as the resulting fire caused the aircraft to break into pieces; most were destroyed by the fire. Only two major parts of the aircraft remained: a part of the left wing that was found 634 ft (193 m) from the accident and a fuselage center section.

== Aftermath ==
The first civilians to come near the scene of the accident said they could see bodies in the rear of the aircraft. Rescue services subsequently went to the crash site. Personnel could see bodies burning within the partially intact fuselage. Rescuers sent victims to a nearby hospital, but poor roads in the area hampered efforts. Fire equipment was provided by two witnesses, helping in extinguishing the fire and rescuing six survivors. Mud blocked the ambulances, requiring tractors to free them. The victims were taken to Fairmont Hospital, where they were pronounced dead shortly after. Alameda County sheriffs and air police from Parks Air Force Base continued recovering bodies inside the aircraft while Transocean Air Lines President Orvis Nelson and Executive Vice President Sam Wilson stayed at the crash scene. Ambulances came from four East Bay hospitals. All 35 people on board died. As there were no survivors, ambulances carried the bodies to Parks Air Force Base for identification. Rumors spread that the aircraft was carrying "secret cargo", but these claims were denied by the United States Air Force. Responders continued identifying victims after the crash site was cleared, as newspapers around the country shared information about the accident. In New Mexico, funeral services were held for the fatalities. Since the men were not killed in battle, they were, in turn, not included in Korean War casualty lists.

== Investigation ==
On March 20, the CAB was notified of the incident. The investigation commenced on March 21 by Earle Mitchell, the head of the Oakland office of the CAB assisted by experts from Southern California. In a preliminary investigation, authorities disregarded the chance of the crash being caused by icing, reporting that the pilot had experience with de-icing problems. However, the United States Weather Bureau announced the freezing level was at 4,855 ft (1,480 m) less than half an hour after the crash. As the investigation continued, conflicting stories and accounts were told by representatives of Transocean Air Lines, aircraft operators, and the Oakland Approach Control. All accounts were studied. On April 16 and 17, a public hearing hosted by the board was held at Leamington Hotel, Oakland. Parts were examined by the CAB, with structural components sorted in a manner that reproduced the possible location the parts were placed in the aircraft. After careful consideration, no evidence of mechanical failure was found. The CAA said the pilot did not indicate trouble when he contacted Oakland San Francisco Bay Airport. Radio records showed no indications the pilot knew the aircraft was in danger.

The aircraft was not found to have struck any object. The right aileron's trim tab was placed in a neutral position, while the pilot's aileron trim tab was placed in an extreme down position. The left aileron separated into two sections. The vertical stabilizer was fine, yet the right and left stabilizers and the elevator and elevator surface were damaged. Both wing fillets and lower fuselage compartment doors were accounted for, indicating neither had not been opened. The wheel mechanism was found to be immovable; due to major damage to the aircraft, the investigation could not determine if the de-icing system was used during the flight. Analysis of the landing gear system showed it was retracted during impact. All carbon dioxide bottles were found unused. The four propellers from the engines were found on the ground. Analysis of the engines found they did not malfunction prior to impact.

The investigation reported numerous eyewitnesses first spotted the aircraft 1 mi (1.6 km) southwest of the crash site beneath the clouds with no unusual noises heard, such as a runway propeller or backfiring. Pilots flying near the crash site shortly before and after the incident reported mild turbulence and light icing. One pilot flying above Newark at 8,000 ft (2,400 m), 35 minutes before the accident, reported severe icing problems; the ice began to melt during the descent when the altitude was 4,500 ft (1,400 m). All CAA ground facilities were operating normally at the time of the incident. During the flight's peak altitude at 8,000 ft (2,400 m), no radio contact was made, indicating the crew had not encountered any problems. Ice accumulating in the aircraft was expected to melt at an altitude of 5,000 ft (1,500 m). The aircraft was not reported to have experienced any difficulties in the last radio contact at an altitude of 3,500 ft (1,100 m). Reports indicate the aircraft became uncontrollable after the last radio contact for unknown reasons. Two witnesses reported the aircraft banked sharply to the right before crashing.

The investigation finished with the findings that the airline, the aircraft, and the crew were properly certificated; numerous weather problems arose, including icing, which may have caused the aircraft to become uncontrollable; witnesses saw the aircraft strike the ground; no warnings were issued prior to impact; and all ground navigational facilities were operating normally, and no malfunction of the aircraft's control systems was found during the flight. The probable cause of the crash was loss of control for unknown reasons.

== See also ==
- United Air Lines Flight 615 - a similar flight which crashed at the same place two years prior
- Transocean Air Lines Flight 512 - another accident from Transocean Air Lines
