= Martin 2-0-2 =

Twin-piston-engine US piston airliner, 1946

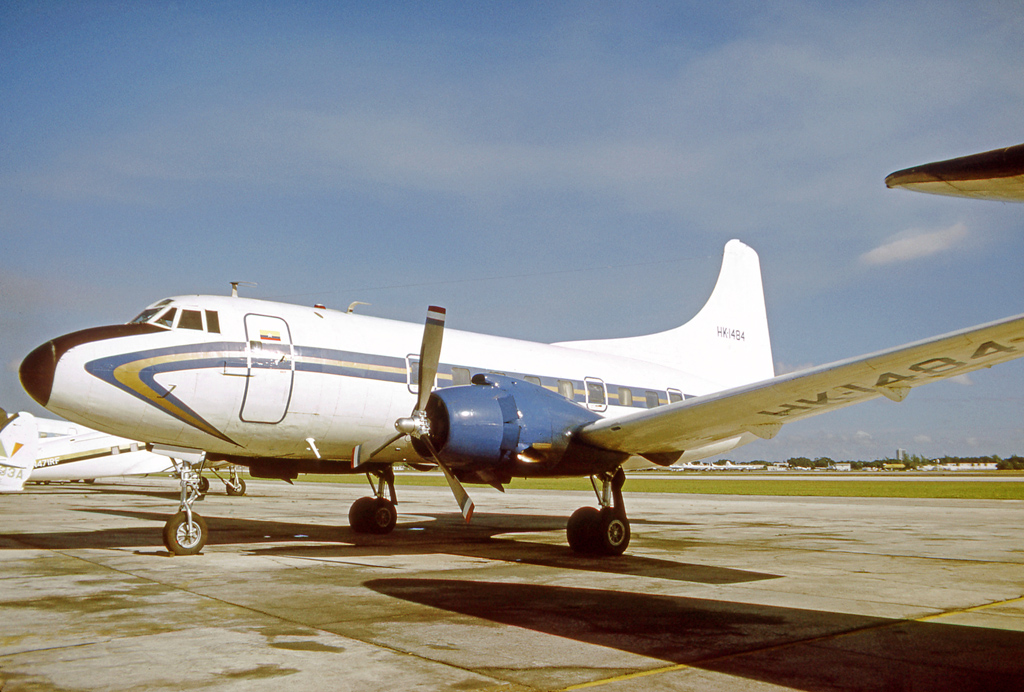
- Former Northwest Airlines Martin 2-0-2 of Aeroproveedora (Colombia) at Fort Lauderdale Florida in 1973

General information
- Type: Airliner
- Manufacturer: Glenn L. Martin Company
- Status: Retired
- Primary users: Northwest Orient Airlines LAN Chile; Trans World Airlines
- Number built: 47

History
- Manufactured: 1947-1948
- Introduction date: August, 1947
- First flight: 22 November 1946
- Retired: about 1975
- Developed into: Martin 4-0-4

The Martin 2-0-2 was a low-wing, all-metal, twin piston-engined American airliner designed and built by the Glenn L. Martin Company. Introduced in 1947, the 40 passenger unpressurized aircraft was powered by Pratt & Whitney R-2800 CA-18 Double Wasp 18-cylinder air-cooled radial engine, and cruised at 255 knots.

== Design and development ==
Glenn L. Martin, president of the company, intended that the Model 2-0-2 would be a replacement for the Douglas DC-3. It was also known as the "Martin Executive".

The first flight of the model was in November 1946. Full civilian certification was gained in August 1947, several months before competing aircraft types. The total production of 2-0-2s and 2-0-2As was 47 aircraft.

The aircraft was not pressurized, but was considered a long-range airliner. The fatal crash in 1948 of Northwest Airlines Flight 421 revealed a serious structural problem in the wings. Structural metal fatigue was the problem in a major wing spar. Aluminum alloy 7075-T6 was used, which is susceptible to stress-corrosion cracking and low toughness. The airliner was grounded and modifications were made. The wing components were redesigned and the engines replaced. The changed type was designated the Martin 2-0-2A.

== Operational history ==
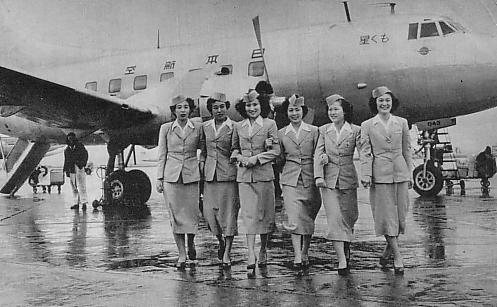
Japan Airlines Martin 2-0-2 "Mokusei" (1951)

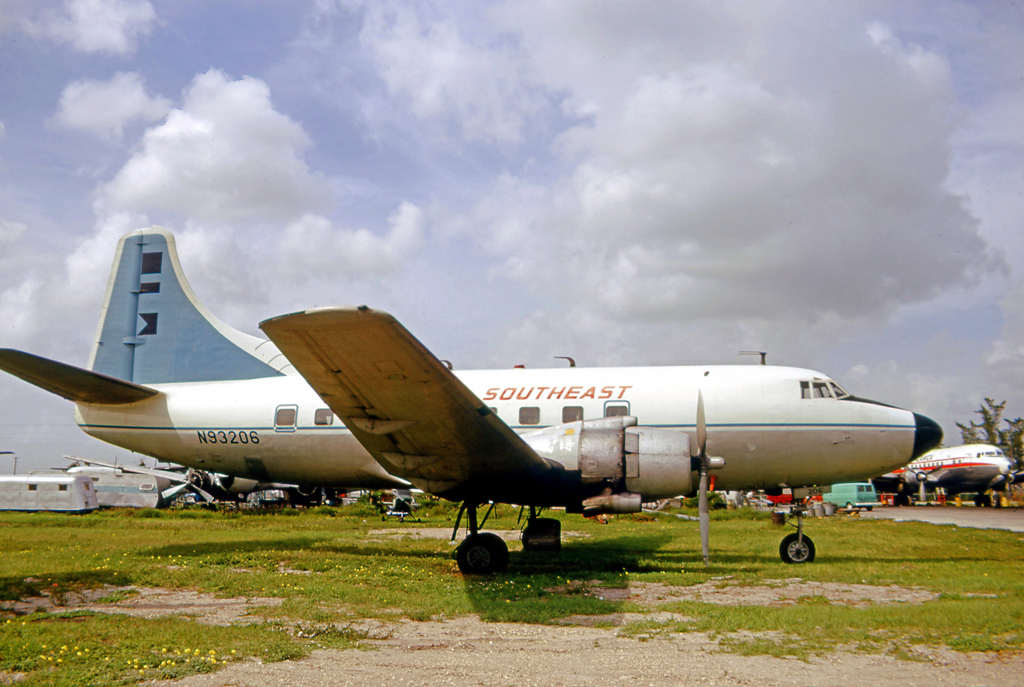
Former TWA Martin 2-0-2A of Southeast Airlines (Florida) at Miami in 1970

On November 13, 1945 Pennsylvania Central Airlines purchased a fleet of 35 Martin 2-0-2s from the Glenn Martin Company for $7,000,000. Two weeks later, Colonial Airlines announced that they would purchase 20 airplanes for $4,000,000, scheduled for delivery in 1947. Early in the next year, Martin announced that Pennsylvania Central Airlines had ordered 15 more 2-0-2s, bringing the total aircraft on order in early January 1947 to 137 aircraft, with a sales value of $27,000,000. Despite the announcement of these large orders, the contract terms allowed the airlines to cancel them without any penalty. The 2-0-2 was unpressurised, unlike the competing Convair 240. Therefore, as delays in production built up, all airlines except Northwest, TWA, LAN, and LAV cancelled their orders and only 31 2-0-2s and 12 2-0-2As were actually delivered to the airlines. The first scheduled flight was on Northwest between Minneapolis and Chicago on 13 October 1947.

The 2-0-2 was the first airplane subjected to the U.S. Civil Aeronautics Administration's then-new "Accelerated Service Test", introduced May 15, 1947. In this test, an airliner was to undergo a rigorous 150-hour test, attempting to squeeze one year's service into a week to 10 days of flying. The 2-0-2 made such a test visiting about 50 cities in seven days. At each city, comprehensive inspections were made of the aircraft systems to assess how wear or malfunction would occur.

TWA and Northwest Airlines, initial customers of the 2-0-2, eventually sold theirs to California Central Airlines and Pioneer Airlines. Later, Allegheny Airlines acquired many of the 2-0-2s as part of the company's expansion plans, beginning June 1, 1955. Eventually, they acquired a total of 18 aircraft.

Only one of this type of aircraft is known to survive, at the Aviation Hall of Fame and Museum of New Jersey.

This airliner was eventually developed into the pressurized, 3 foot longer, same powered, slightly slower Martin 4-0-4, which was more successful.

== Variants ==
The Martin Company designated the following quantities for the airlines (though not all were built), listed by Martin Model number:

2-0-2
twin engine prototype: 3, in 1946
2-0-2FL
twin engine commercial transport, Chile: 4, in 1947
2-0-2NW
twin engine commercial transport, Northwest Airlines: 25, in 1947
2-0-2LAV
twin engine commercial transport, Venezuela: 2, in 1947
2-0-2A
twin engine commercial transport, Trans World Airlines: 21, in 1947
2-0-2E
twin engine commercial transport, Eastern Airlines: 25, in 1947

== Operators ==
♠ original operators

Chile

- LAN Chile ♠ (four new delivered, 1947–1948)

Colombia

- Aeroproveedora

Japan

- Japan Air Lines (five leased from Transocean in 1951–1952)

Mexico

- Servicios Aéreos Baja

Panama

- RAPSA Panama

United States

- Admiral Airlines
- Allegheny Airlines (18, 1955–1966)
- California Central Airlines
- Martin Air Transport
- Modern Air Transport
- Northwest Orient Airlines ♠ (25 new delivered, 1947)
- Pacific Air Lines (seven, 1958–1964)
- Pioneer Air Lines (nine, 1952–1960)
- Southeast Airlines (Florida)
- Southwest Airways
- Trans World Airlines ♠ (12 new delivered, 1950)
- Transocean Air Lines (15, 1951–1952)

Venezuela

- Linea Aeropostal Venezolana ♠ (two new delivered, 1947)

== Accidents and incidents ==
The Martin 2-0-2 had 13 hull-loss accidents and incidents, of which nine were fatal accidents.

- 29 August 1948 – Northwest Airlines Flight 421 crashed after losing a wing near Winona, Minnesota, United States, with 37 fatalities.
- 7 March 1950 – Northwest Orient Airlines Flight 307 crashed after hitting a flag pole near Minneapolis-St. Paul, Minnesota, United States, with 15 fatalities including two on the ground.
- 13 October 1950 – A Northwest Orient 2-0-2 crashed on a training flight at Almelund, Minnesota, with six fatalities.
- 7 November 1950 – Northwest Orient Flight 115 crashed into a mountain near Butte, Montana, United States, with 21 fatalities.
- 16 January 1951 – Northwest Orient Flight 115 crashed with 10 fatalities near Reardan, Washington, United States, after a sudden unexplained loss of control during cruise.
- 5 November 1951 – Transocean Air Lines Flight 5763 crashed on approach to Tucumcari Municipal Airport near Tucumcari, New Mexico, United States, with one fatality.
- 9 April 1952 – The 2-0-2 Mokusei, leased from Northwest Orient Airlines and operating as Japan Air Lines Flight 301, crashed into Mount Mihara on Izu Ōshima in Japan with 37 fatalities.
- 12 January 1955 – Trans World Airlines Flight 694 was destroyed in a midair collision with a privately owned Douglas DC-3 near Covington, Kentucky, United States, killing all 13 people on the 2-0-2 and both on the DC-3.
- 14 November 1955 – An Allegheny Airlines 2-0-2's undercarriage collapsed while landing at Wilmington-New Castle Airport in New Castle County, Delaware, at the end of a training flight. The aircraft was damaged beyond repair.
- 30 December 1955 – A Southwest Airways 2-0-2 was destroyed in a hangar fire at San Francisco, California, United States.
- 21 August 1959 – A Pacific Air Lines 2-0-2A was damaged beyond repair after a ground incident with a Curtiss C-46 Commando at Burbank, California, United States.
- 1 December 1959 – Allegheny Airlines Flight 371 crashed into a mountain on approach to Williamsport, Pennsylvania, United States, with 25 fatalities.
- 2 November 1963 – An Allegheny Airlines 2-0-2 was damaged beyond repair at Newark, New Jersey, United States.

== Specifications (Martin 2-0-2) ==
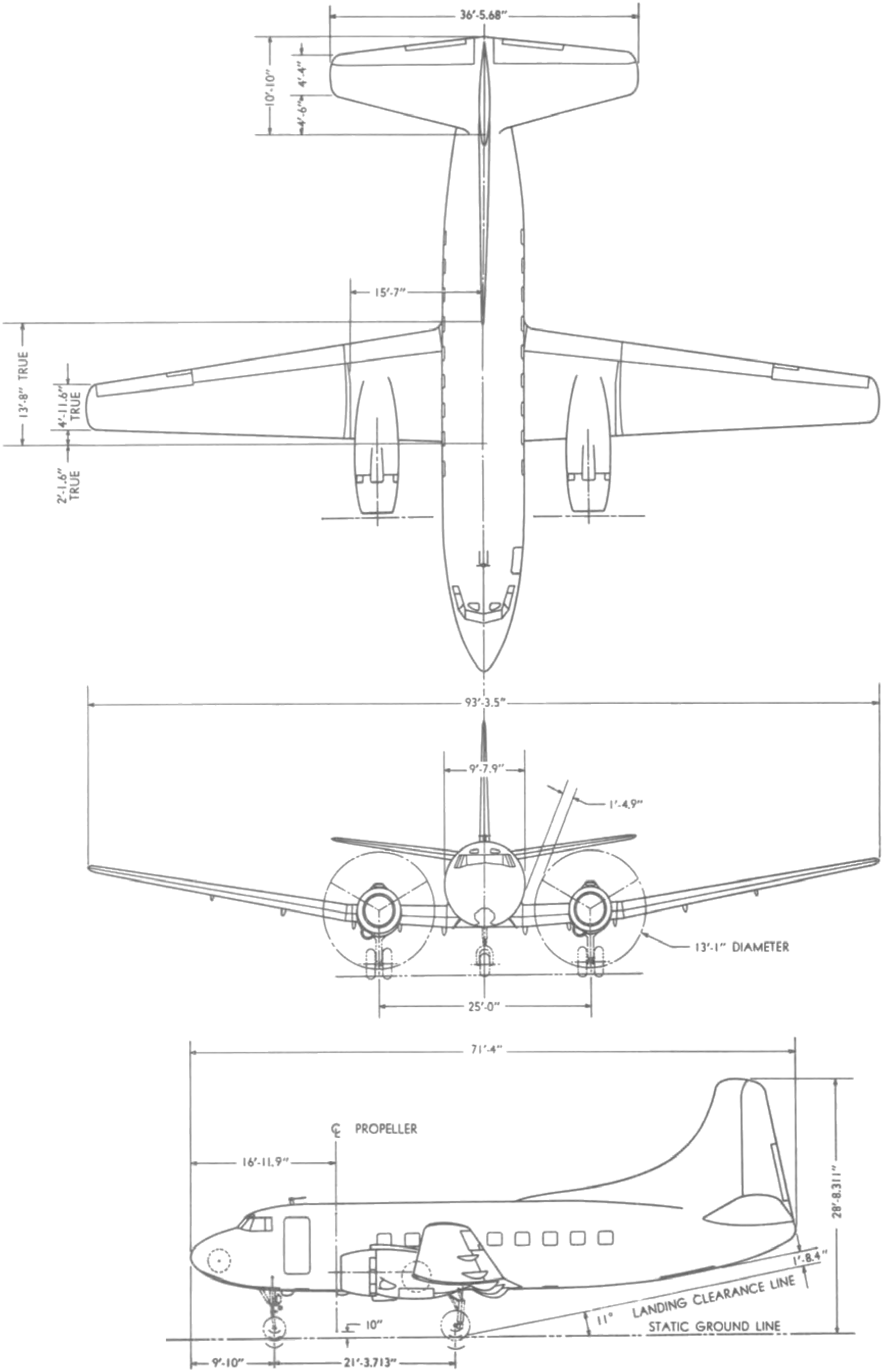
3-view silhouette drawing of the Martin 2-0-2NW

Data from Jane's All The World's Aircraft 1951–52

General characteristics

- Crew: 2
- Capacity:
  - 40 passengers or
  - 9,270 lb (4,200 kg) payload
- Length: 71 ft 4 in (21.74 m)
- Wingspan: 93 ft 3 in (28.42 m)
- Height: 28 ft 5 in (8.66 m)
- Wing area: 864 sq ft (80.3 m^{2})
- Empty weight: 25,086 lb (11,379 kg)
- Max takeoff weight: 39,900 lb (18,098 kg)
- Powerplant: 2 × Pratt & Whitney R-2800 CA-18 Double Wasp 18-cylinder air-cooled radial engine, 1,800 hp (1,300 kW) each (Normal power), 2,400 hp (1,800 kW) (take-off with water injection)
- Propellers: 3-bladed Hamilton Standard 2H17K3-48R, 13 ft 1 in (3.99 m) diameter

Performance

- Maximum speed: 311 mph (501 km/h, 270 kn) at 14,000 ft (4,300 m)
- Cruise speed: 293 mph (472 km/h, 255 kn) at 12,000 ft (3,700 m)
- Stall speed: 76 mph (122 km/h, 66 kn)
- Range: 635 mi (1,022 km, 552 nmi) 36 passengers, baggage and 1,000 lb (450 kg) cargo, reserves for 200 mi (170 nmi; 320 km) plus 45 minutes
- Service ceiling: 33,000 ft (10,000 m)
- Rate of climb: 2,200 ft/min (11 m/s)
- Take-off run to 50 ft (15 m): 1,565 ft (477 m)
- Landing run from 50 ft (15 m): 1,720 ft (520 m)

== See also ==
Related development

- Martin 4-0-4

Aircraft of comparable role, configuration, and era

- Convair CV-240
- Ilyushin Il-12

Related lists

- List of civil aircraft
