= Transocean Air Lines =

US supplemental air carrier, 1946–1960

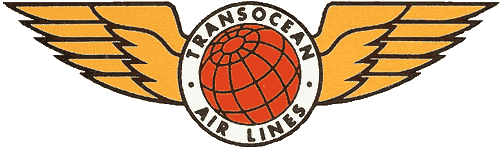

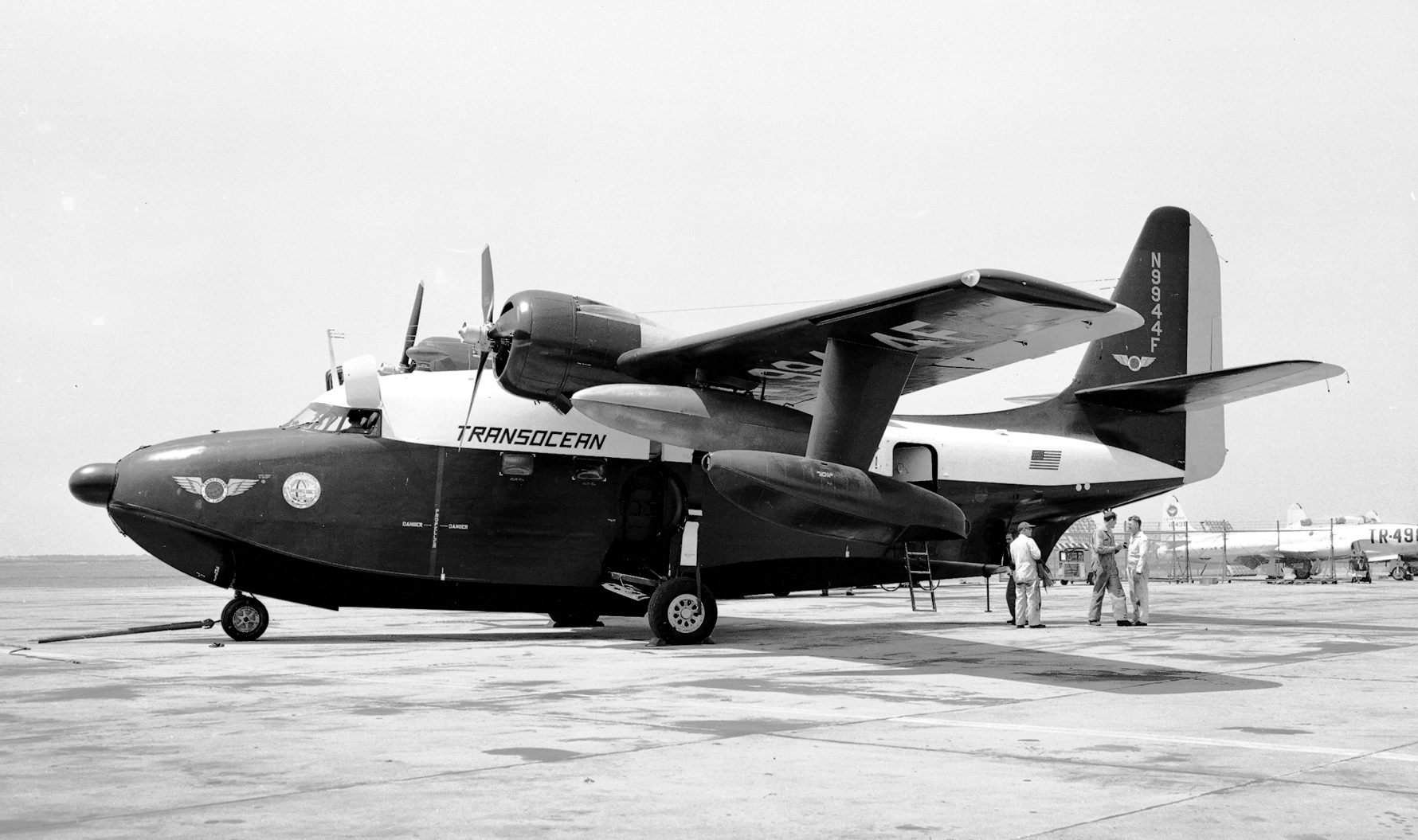
- SA-16 Albatross used for Trust Territory service, Oakland 1954
IATA	ICAO	Call sign
TL^{(1)}	TL^{(1)}	TALOA
- Founded: May 21, 1946 incorporated in California
- Commenced operations: March 18, 1946 as Orvis Nelson Air Transport
- Ceased operations: January 1960
- Operating bases: Oakland, California
- Parent company: The Transocean Corporation of California (1956–1960)
- Headquarters: Oakland, California; United States
- Founder: Orvis M. Nelson

Notes
- (1) IATA, ICAO codes were the same until the 1980s

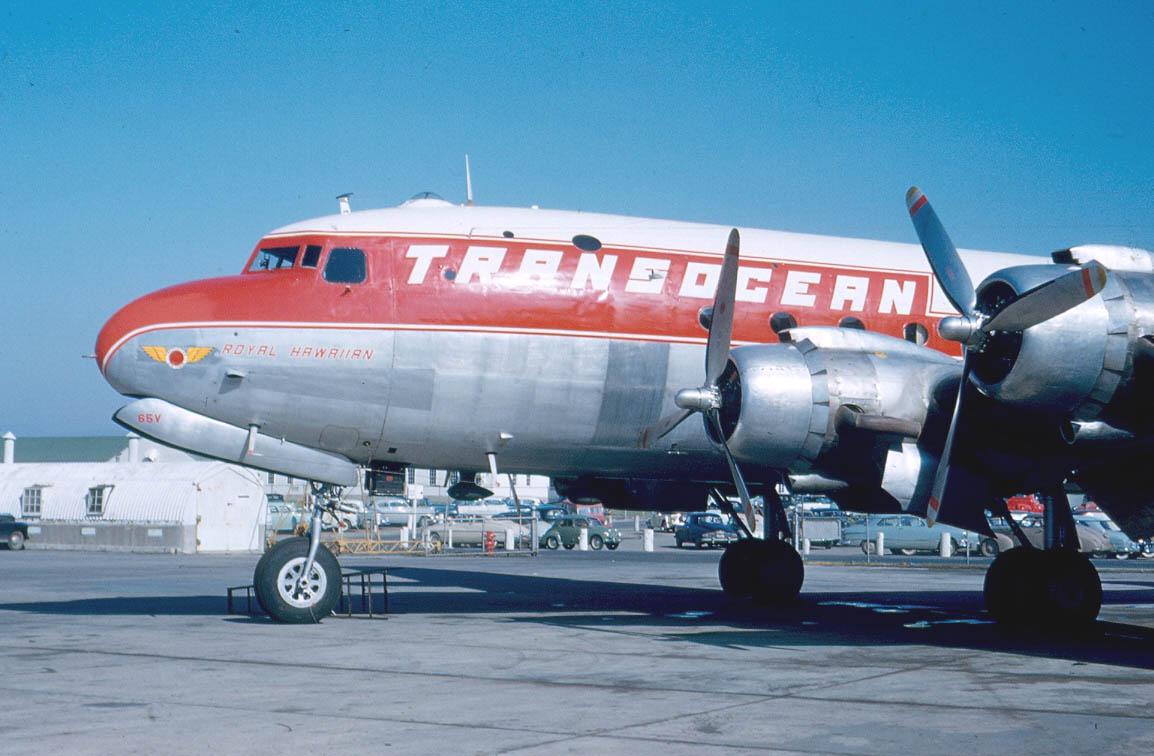
Transocean Douglas DC-4

Known for the first few months of its existence as Orvis Nelson Air Transport (or ONAT), Transocean Air Lines was a supplemental air carrier, a type of U.S. airline defined and regulated by the Civil Aeronautics Board (CAB), the now-defunct United States Government agency that, from 1938 to 1978, tightly regulated almost all U.S. commercial air transportation. During the time the airline operated, supplemental airlines were charter/scheduled hybrids, legally able to operate a limited amount of scheduled service, which Transocean did, especially towards the end of its existence. Transocean was based in Oakland, California. The airline was among the most operationally capable of the supplemental airlines, regularly operating many thousands of miles from the United States. At times it accounted for over 20% of the revenue of all supplemental air carriers, and it usually was the largest supplemental by revenue. However, Transocean fell on increasingly hard financial times during the 1950s and ceased operating in 1960.

== History ==
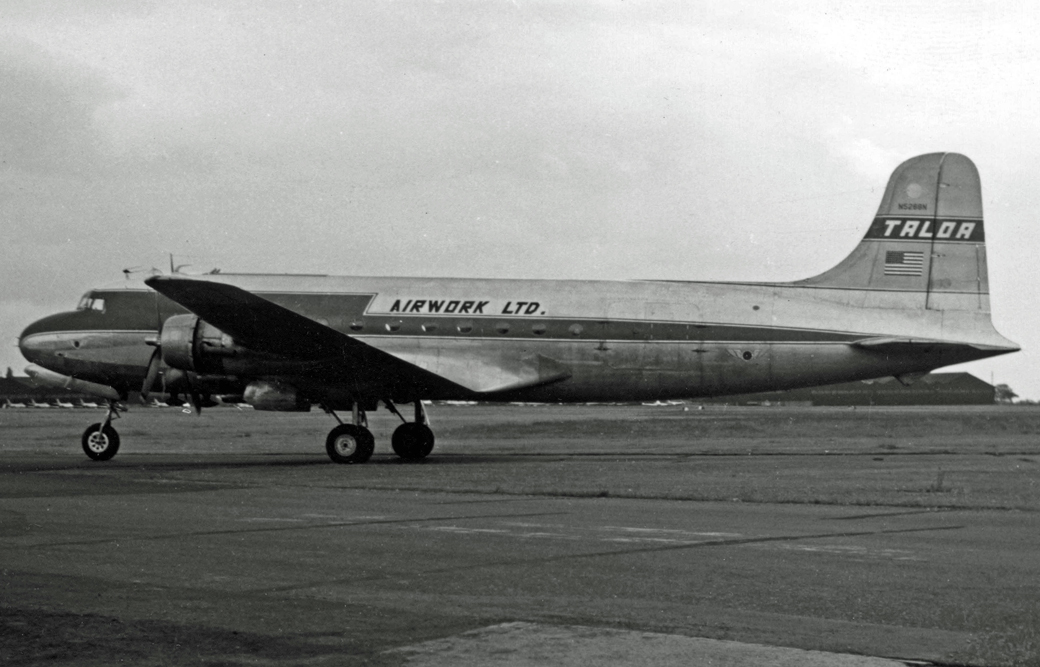
Douglas R5D-1 Skymaster subleased to a UK operator, 1955, Manchester

Transocean founder Orvis Marcus Nelson was an Air Transport Command (ATC) pilot during World War II. Upon the end of the war in August 1945, he was sent to Okinawa, where he and several other aviators attempted to organize a new Japanese domestic airline with assistance from United Air Lines. United president Pat Patterson was not interested in the proposal, but introduced Nelson to General Douglas MacArthur, who also rejected the proposal.

Nelson returned to the United States and flew for several months as a United pilot, but was recruited by United management to organize a new airline operation in March 1946. The new airline would fulfill an ATC contract to provide military airlift service between San Francisco and Honolulu using surplus C-54 aircraft. ONAT's first flight operated on March 18, and thereafter the airline carried many American soldiers and sailors home from the South Pacific theater.

Transocean Air Lines was incorporated in California on 21 May 1946. On 13 October 1955, the name of the corporation changed to The Transocean Corporation of California (TCC) and a separate Transocean Air Lines was incorporated. In 1956 the CAB approved the transfer of the operating authority to the new Transocean Air Lines and TCC became a holding company for the airline and its subsidiaries.

Later in 1946, TAL was contracted by Philippine Airlines to provide a transpacific DC-4 charter service between the United States and the Philippines, which was for a brief time in 1946 the only commercial flight operating between the United States and East Asia. The service was extended to Shanghai, Bangkok, and Karachi later that year.

Transocean provided personnel for Pak-Air, an airline in the newly formed country of Pakistan, from 1947 to 1949.

In 1948 Transocean began to operate twice weekly service between Caracas and Rome after making a deal with the Venezuelan government. By this time, it operated 16 maintenance bases in Europe and the Pacific region.

The Chinese Nationalist Air Force hired Transocean to ferry 157 Curtiss C-46 Commando transport aircraft from California to Shanghai in 1948. Transocean refitted each aircraft with additional fuel tanks to extend its range to 2,600 miles and flew the aircraft to China via Honolulu, Wake Island, Guam, and Okinawa.

The Civil Aeronautics Board charged Transocean with illegally transporting passengers overseas in 1948; Transocean argued that the CAB had no jurisdiction over charter flights, beginning a legal fight which continued into the 1950s. Thereafter, in 1949 and 1950, Transocean received special permission to conduct transatlantic charter flights.

In 1949, the airline was tapped by the Department of the Interior and United Nations to provide air service to the Trust Territory of the Pacific Islands from a base at Guam, using four SA-16 Albatross flying boats for this service. Pan American took over operation of the Trust Territory service upon TAL's bankruptcy.

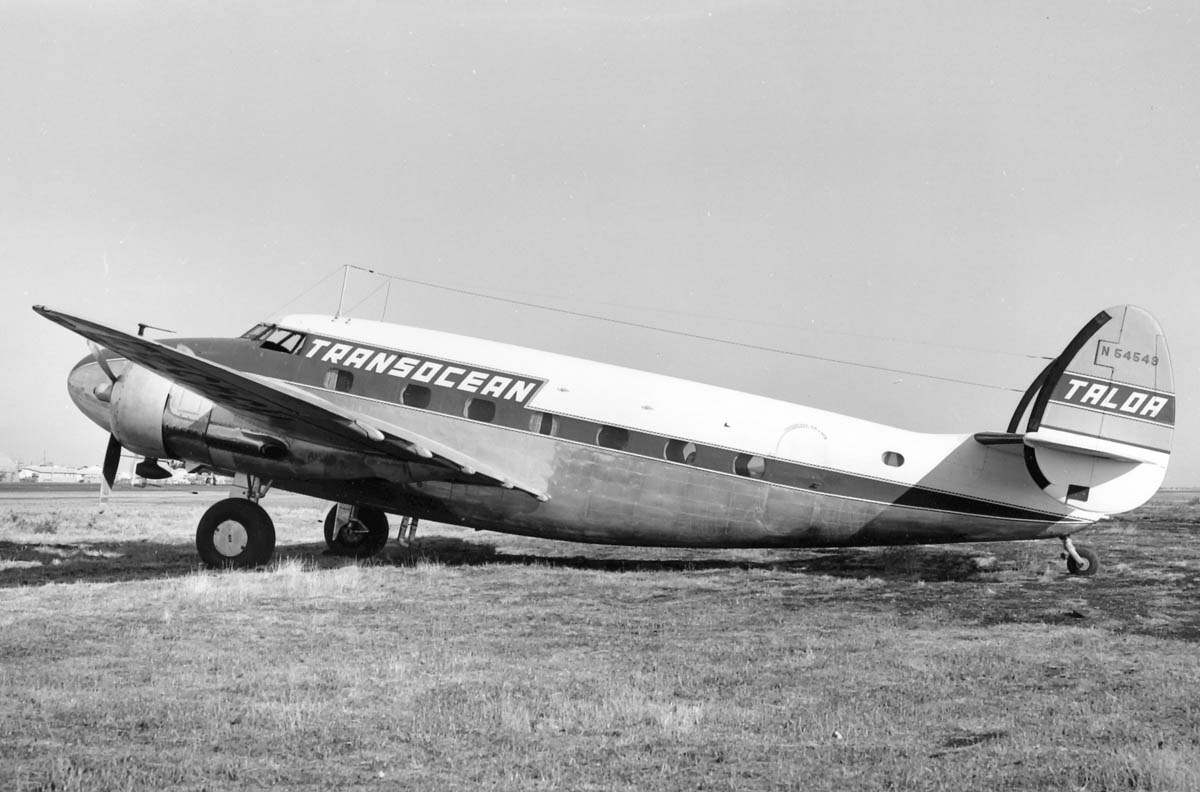
Lockheed Lodestar at Oakland 1952. Note "TALOA" on the tail.

Transocean assisted in the startup of Air Djibouti in 1949 and was thereafter involved in the startup of Air Jordan. It was one of the operating carriers of the Berlin Airlift (1948–1949) and provided around 10% of the U.S. military's airlift requirements for the Korean War (1950–1953).

Transocean provided the initial equipment and crews for Japan Airlines in 1951 (fulfilling a contract originally signed by Northwest Airlines), and in 1952 signed an agreement to provide crews, dispatchers, and instructors to train JAL's local personnel. Transocean also supplied mechanics and instructors to start up JAL's maintenance operation.

In 1952 Transocean entered into a wet lease agreement to operate cargo flights for Scandinavian Airlines.

In 1953 the government of Afghanistan hired Transocean to provide weekly Kabul-Kandahar-Jerusalem-Cairo air service.

Transocean Air Lines Financial Results, 1952 thru 1960(1) All supplemental air carriers
	1952	1953	1954	1955	1956	1957	1958	1959	1960
USD 000:									
Operating revenue	17,184	9,792	9,003	7,000	7,853	12,194	17,891	12,909	88
Profit (loss) before tax	4,345	(899)	(1,589)	(68)	(811)	(1,971)	(3,056)	(6,709)	(5,406)
% of operating revenue:									
Military charter		78.3	69.5	19.5	22.7	33.3	35.7	24.7	0.0
Civilian charter		6.5	6.7	10.5	7.7	0.9	7.3	18.5	0.0
Scheduled		11.9	22.3	37.4	29.5	34.5	33.7	53.2	90.9
Other	30.3	3.2	1.5	32.5	40.0	31.4	23.4	3.6	9.1
Operating revenue:									
% of industry^{(1)}	24.1	14.0	16.5	9.1	11.6	24.2	27.4	16.9	0.1
Industry^{(1)} rank	1	2	1	2	1	1	1	1	

=== Bankruptcy and legacy ===
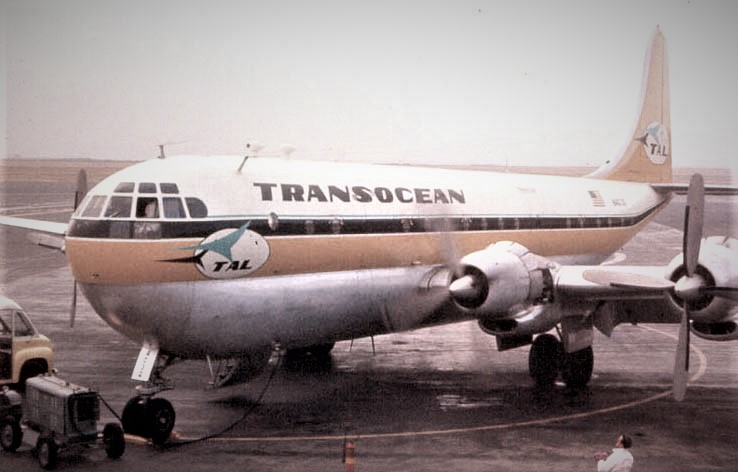
Transocean Boeing 377 Stratocruiser

In the 1950s, Transocean attempted to obtain certification to serve Asia through Hawaii and Guam, a market then mainly served by Pan Am and being contested by several other airlines. Transocean's request was denied by the Civil Aeronautics Board in 1955. Thereafter, the company attempted a reorganization with outside financing so that it could procure new aircraft, but by the time CAB approval was obtained in 1959, Transocean was already in dire financial straits.

Transocean stopped operating in January 1960. The airline entered bankruptcy later that year. Historians are divided as to the causes of its demise, with some citing government interference with its core business and others citing Nelson's reckless management practices.

United States Overseas Airlines, another supplemental air carrier, took over TAL's Pacific route to Okinawa.

As of 2010, a half-century after the airline's demise, nearly 200 of its former employees and their children and grandchildren were members of the Taloa Alumni Association. As of 2020, the Transocean group met for a reunion every year.

The aviator, author, sailor, and conservationist Ernest K. Gann (1910–1991) and the aviator Slonnie Sloniger (1896–1969) worked at Transocean.

== Destinations ==
According to its October 27, 1958 system timetable, Transocean was operating scheduled passenger service with Lockheed Constellation propliners on the following routes:

- Burbank (BUR) – Honolulu (HNL) – operated three days a week round trip
- Oakland (OAK) – Honolulu (HNL) – operated three days a week round trip
- Oakland (OAK) – Burbank (BUR) – Chicago Midway Airport (MDW) – New York Idlewild Airport (IDL, now JFK Airport) – Hartford (BDL) – operated twice a week round trip
- Oakland (OAK) – Honolulu (HNL) – Wake Island (AWK) – Guam (GUM) – Okinawa (OKA) – operated twice a week round trip

== Fleet ==
Aircraft operated by Transocean Air Lines Total: 146 aircraft, of which 68 were DC-4s. In addition, Taloa Academy of Aeronautics had a total of 56 single-engined trainers at its peak. Not all aircraft were used at the same time, see fleet history website

- 8 – Boeing 377 Stratocruiser from 1958–60
- 1 – Cessna 170
- 1 – Cessna 182
- 1 – Cessna T-50 from 1948
- 5 – Consolidated PBY Catalina from 1949–58
- 2 – Convair CV-340
- 16 – Curtis C-46 Commando
- 9 – Douglas DC-3
- 68 – Douglas DC-4 from 1946–60
- 1 – Douglas DC-6B
- 4 – Grumman G-44 Widgeon
- 1 – Lockheed Model 18 Lodestar
- 3 – Lockheed L-749A Constellation from 1958–59
- 2 – Lockheed L-1049G Super Constellation from 1958–59
- 13 – Martin 2-0-2
- 4 – Noorduyn Norseman from 1950–52
- 1 – Piper PA-18 Super Cub from 1950–52
- 1 – Stinson Reliant from 1950–52

As of 30 September 1953, the fleet comprised:

- 2 DC-3
- 6 DC-4
- 5 C-46

== Accidents and incidents ==
During almost 14 years of continuous airline activity Transocean's total casualties were 90 passengers and 16 crew.

- 15 August 1949: A Transocean Air Lines Douglas C-54A Skymaster (N79998) ditched 7 nautical miles (13 km; 8.1 mi) off Lurga Point, Ireland, due to fuel exhaustion after the pilot overflew Shannon Airport, where the plane was due to refuel, and attempted to return. All 58 passengers and crew evacuated the aircraft, but seven passengers and one crew member either drowned or died of exposure. The aircraft was flying from Rome to New York City.
- 5 November 1951: Transocean Air Lines Flight 5763, a Martin 2-0-2 (N93039), crashed in fog at Tucumcari Municipal Airport outside Tucumcari, New Mexico, killing one of the 29 people on board.
- 30 December 1951: Transocean Air Lines Flight 501, a Curtiss C-46 Commando (N68963), crashed near Fairbanks, Territory of Alaska, due to spatial disorientation caused by pilot error, killing all four passengers and crew on board. The wreckage was found on January 3, 1952.
- 20 March 1953: Transocean Air Lines Flight 942, a Douglas C-54G Skymaster (N88942, formerly the United States Army Air Forces 45-623), crashed in a field 12 miles (19 km) southwest of Alvarado, California, killing all 35 passengers and crew. The official cause was an unexplained loss of control, with investigators noting that icing might explain the loss of control.
- 12 July 1953: Transocean Air Lines Flight 512, a Douglas DC-6A (N90806), crashed in the Pacific Ocean 344 nautical miles (637 km; 396 mi) east of Wake Island, killing all 58 passengers and crew. No primary structure of the aircraft was recovered, so the accident investigation team was unable to determine a cause of the crash.

== In popular culture ==
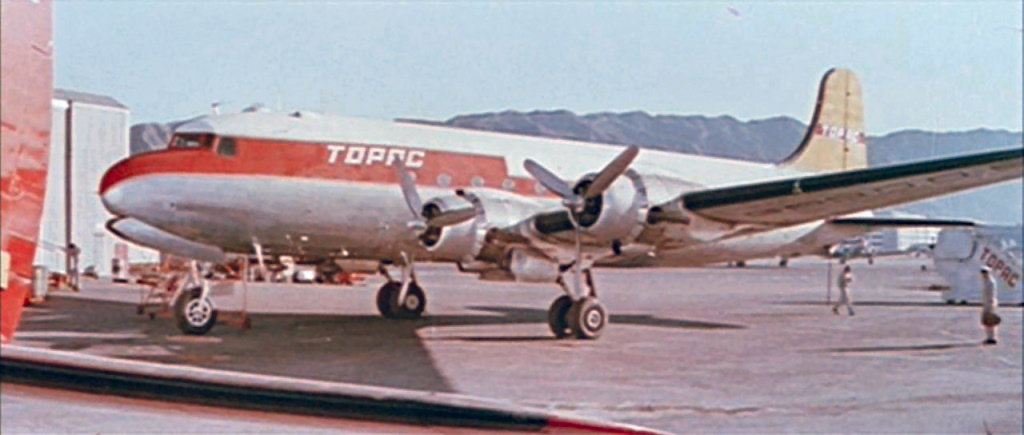
"TOPAC" DC-4 from The High and the Mighty

The 1954 film The High and the Mighty featured a thinly-disguised Transocean Douglas DC-4. The aircraft (N4665V) featured in the daylight flying sequences and the Honolulu "gate" sequence was a former C-54A-10-DC built as a military transport in 1942 at Long Beach, California, by Douglas Aircraft Company and named The African Queen. The exterior and flying sequences were filmed in November 1953. Ernest K. Gann wrote the original novel while he was flying DC-4s for Transocean over the Hawaii-California routes. The film's fictional airline's name "TOPAC" was painted over the Transocean's red, white and yellow color scheme for filming.

== See also ==
- Supplemental air carrier
- List of defunct airlines of the United States

== Bibliography ==
- Thruelsen R., Transocean-The story of an unusual airline, Henry Holt & Co., New York, 1953
- Davies R.E.G., Rebels and reformers of the airways, Airlife Publishing Ltd. & Smithsonian Institution Press, 1987
- Szura A., Folded wings-A history of Transocean Air Lines, Pictorial Histories Publishing Co., Missoula (Mont.), 1989
