= 1955 Cincinnati mid-air collision =

Fatal plane crash over northern Kentucky

Coordinates: 39°02′56″N 84°40′04″W

Accident
- Date: January 12, 1955
- Summary: Mid-air collision
- Site: Boone County, Kentucky
- Total fatalities: 15
- Total survivors: 0

First aircraft
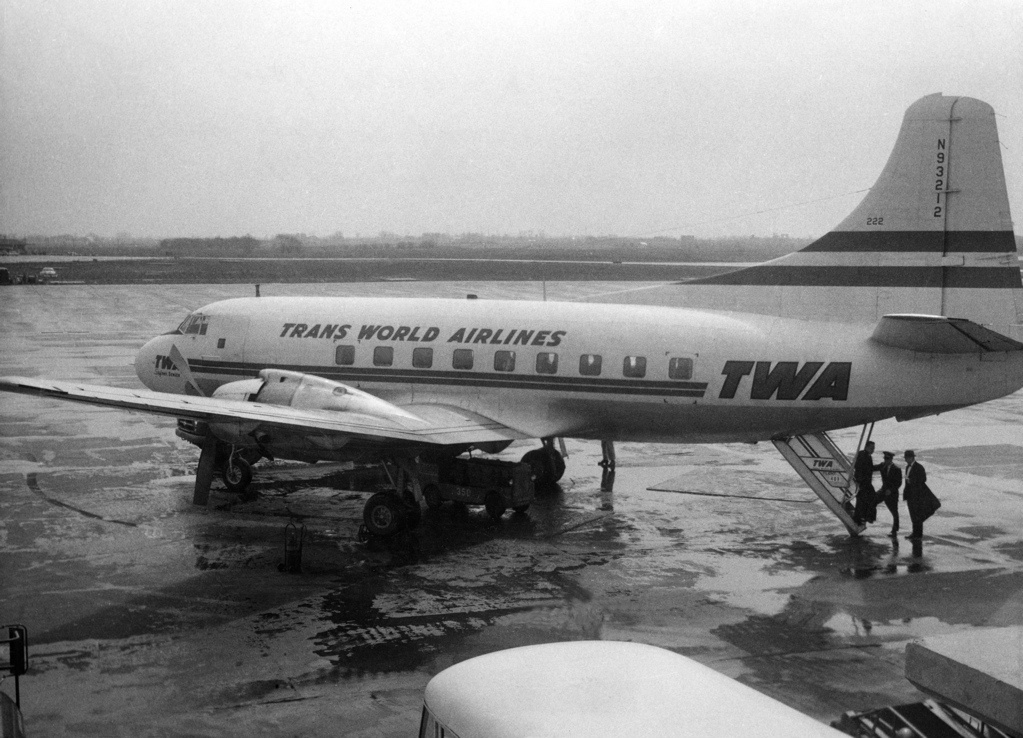
- A Trans World Airlines Martin 2-0-2 similar to the one involved in this accident
- Type: Martin 2-0-2A
- Operator: TWA
- Registration: N93211
- Flight origin: Boone County Airport
- Destination: Cleveland-Hopkins International Airport
- Occupants: 13
- Passengers: 10
- Crew: 3
- Fatalities: 13
- Survivors: 0

Second aircraft
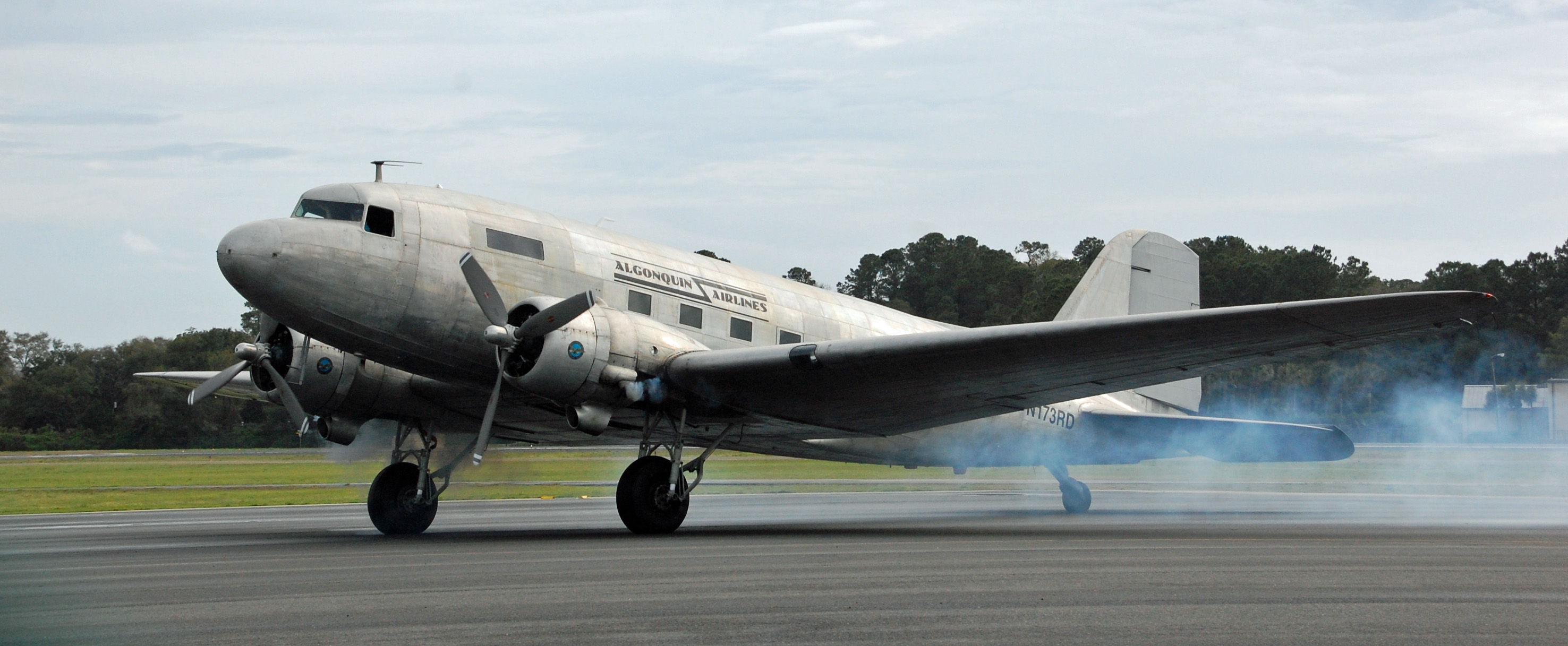
- A Douglas DC-3C similar to the accident aircraft
- Type: Douglas DC-3
- Operator: Castleton Inc.
- Registration: N999B
- Flight origin: Battle Creek
- Destination: Lexington, Kentucky
- Occupants: 2
- Passengers: 0
- Crew: 2
- Fatalities: 2
- Survivors: 0

The 1955 Cincinnati mid-air collision occurred on January 12, 1955, when Trans World Airlines Flight 694 Martin 2-0-2 on takeoff from Boone County Airport (now the Cincinnati/Northern Kentucky International Airport) collided in mid-air with a privately owned Douglas DC-3 that had entered the airport's control space without proper clearance. None of the occupants of either plane survived the collision.

== Aircraft and crews ==
The TWA plane, flown by Captain J. W. Quinn and co-pilot Robert K. Childress, with air hostess (flight attendant) Patricia Ann Stermer, was a regularly scheduled flight bound for Dayton, Ohio, en route to Cleveland. Ten passengers were aboard.

The DC-3 was piloted by Arthur "Slim" Werkhaven of Sturgis, Michigan, with co-pilot Edward Agner of Battle Creek, Michigan, and was being flown from Battle Creek en route to Lexington, Kentucky. They were to pick up Mr. and Mrs. Fredrick Van Lennep. Mrs. Van Lennep, the former Frances Dodge, was an officer of the firm that owned the plane and founded the Dodge Stables at Meadow Brook Farm, later moving Dodge Stables to Castleton Farm in Lexington. The plane would have carried the Van Lenneps to Delray Beach, Florida.

== Collision and crash ==
The Martin 2-0-2A had just taken off from the airport on Runway 22 and was climbing in a right turn through a cloud base at 700–900 ft when the collision occurred about 9:00 am. The DC-3 was en route from Michigan flying VFR heading roughly south towards Lexington. The right wing of Flight 694 struck the left wing of the DC-3, which caused the right wing of the Martin to separate and the DC-3 experienced fuselage, rudder, and fin damage. Following the collision, both aircraft crashed out of control, hitting the ground about two miles apart. The wreckage of one of the aircraft fell along Hebron-Limaburg Road, two miles northeast of Burlington, Kentucky. The crash had no survivors from either aircraft.

== Aftermath ==
The control tower, operated by the Civil Aeronautics Authority (CAA), reported that it had no record of a flight plan for either aircraft. A CAA spokesman said that radio messages from the TWA plane shortly after takeoff indicated the pilot was "alarmed and excited". The spokesman also said the pilot was cleared for takeoff and to make a right turn out.

TWA later filed a $2 million damage suit against the Castleton Corporation of Kentucky.

The probable cause was determined to be operating the DC-3 in a controlled zone with unknown traffic, i.e. no clearance received and no communication with the airport tower.

== See also ==
- Aviation safety
- List of accidents and incidents involving commercial aircraft
