= Robert Clark (author) =

American writer

- Born: April 9, 1952 (age 74); Saint Paul, Minnesota, U.S.
- Occupations: Novelist; writer
- Writing career
- Genre: Non-fiction

Robert Clark (born April 9, 1952) is an American novelist and writer of nonfiction. He has received the Edgar, James Beard and Julia Child awards, the Pacific Northwest Booksellers Award, and the Washington State Book Award as well as being a finalist for the Los Angeles Times Book Award and the IMPAC Dublin Award. He has also been a Guggenheim Fellow and his books have been TLS and New York Times Notable Books of the Year. A native of St. Paul, Minnesota, he lives in New York City.

== Works ==
=== Fiction ===
- In the Deep Midwinter (1998)
- Mr. White's Confession (1999)
- Love Among the Ruins (2002)
- Lives of the Artists (2005)

=== Nonfiction ===
- James Beard: A Biography (1993)
- River of the West: A Chronicle of the Columbia (1997)
- The Solace of Food: A Life of James Beard (1998)
- My Grandfather's House: A Genealogy of Doubt and Faith (2000)
- Dark Water: Flood and Redemption in the City of Masterpieces (2008)
- My Victorians: Lost in the Nineteenth Century (2019)
