= Japan Air Lines Flight 301 =

1952 aviation accident

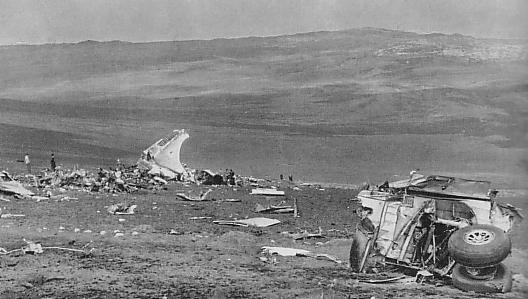
- The wreckage of Flight 301 at the crash site

Accident
- Date: 9 April 1952
- Summary: Controlled flight into terrain for unknown reasons
- Site: Mount Mihara, Izu Ōshima, Japan

Aircraft
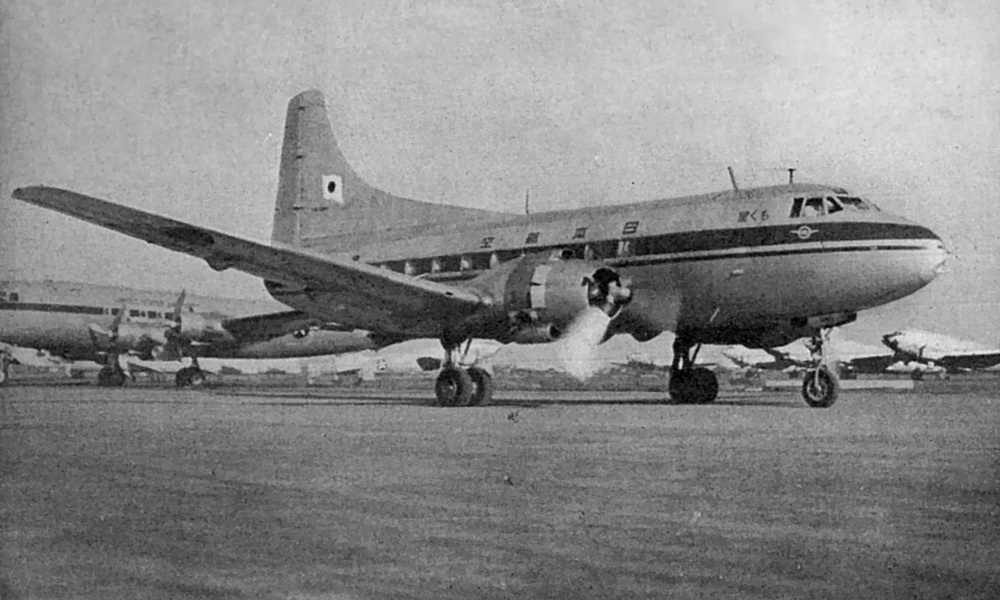
- N93043, the aircraft involved in the accident
- Aircraft type: Martin 2-0-2
- Aircraft name: Mokusei-go (Jupiter)
- Operator: Japan Air Lines
- Registration: N93043
- Flight origin: Tokyo-Haneda Airport, Japan
- Stopover: Itami Airport, Japan
- Destination: Fukuoka Airport, Japan
- Occupants: 37
- Passengers: 33
- Crew: 4
- Fatalities: 37
- Survivors: 0

The crash of Japan Air Lines Flight 301 was an accident involving a Martin 2-0-2 of the Japanese airline Japan Air Lines on Mount Mihara, Izu Ōshima, Japan on 9 April 1952, killing all 37 people on board.

== Accident ==
Flight 301 took off from Tokyo-Haneda Airport in Tokyo, Japan on the morning of April 9, 1952 on a scheduled flight to Fukuoka Airport in Fukuoka, Japan with a stopover in Itami Airport, Japan. The aircraft was carrying 4 crew members and 33 passengers. While flight 301 was cruising approximately 62 miles (100 km) south of Tokyo in marginal weather conditions, the aircraft crashed into the slope of Mount Mihara on Izu Ōshima at 8.07 am. The plane's wreckage was then discovered several hours after the crash, which revealed that none of the 37 people on board had survived.

== Aircraft ==
The Martin 2-0-2 involved, registered N93043 and named Mokusei-go (もく星号, Jupiter), was built in 1947 and was leased from Northwest Airlines to Japan Air Lines at the time of the crash.

== Aftermath ==
The aircraft was destroyed in the accident, while all 37 occupants of the flight were killed. An investigation of the accident by the Japanese government aircraft accident investigation committee was hampered by the occupation authorities due to their refusal to provide a tape recording of the conversations between the ATC at Haneda Airport and Flight 301. Alongside the fact that flight 301 was not equipped with either a cockpit voice recorder or a flight data recorder, the exact cause of the crash could not be determined. The committee proposed that the only evidence they had, which was that the aircraft had deviated from its original course, suggested that the cause of the accident was due to a navigational error by the pilots of flight 301.
