= Transocean Air Lines Flight 512 =

1953 aviation accident

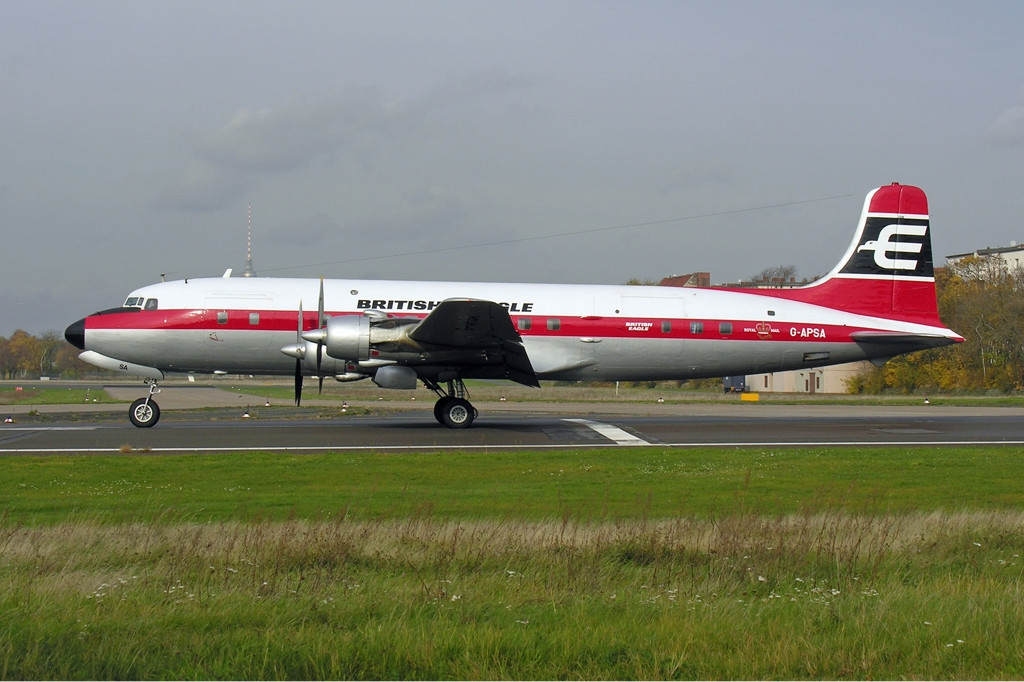
- A Douglas DC-6A, similar to the aircraft involved

Accident
- Date: July 12, 1953
- Summary: Undetermined (aircraft never recovered)
- Site: Approx. 630 kilometres (390 mi) east of Wake Island, Pacific Ocean

Aircraft
- Aircraft type: Douglas DC-6A
- Operator: Transocean Air Lines
- Registration: N90806
- Flight origin: Guam, United States Territory
- 1st stopover: Wake Island, United States Territory
- 2nd stopover: Honolulu, Hawaii, United States (Territory in 1953)
- Destination: Oakland, California, US
- Occupants: 58
- Passengers: 50
- Crew: 8
- Fatalities: 58
- Survivors: 0

On July 12, 1953, Transocean Air Lines Flight 512, a Douglas DC-6A operated by Transocean Air Lines from Guam to Oakland, California, crashed into the Pacific Ocean roughly 630 km (340 nmi) east of Wake Island while en route to Honolulu for a planned stopover. All 58 passengers and crew on board were killed.

== Crash ==
On July 12, Flight 512 was scheduled to fly from Guam to Oakland, California, stopping at Wake Island and Honolulu. The aircraft departed Guam at 00:04 GMT (Note: All times are displayed in the 24-hour clock format and are in Greenwich Mean Time) and arrived at Wake Island at 05:39 without incident. After boarding one additional passenger, Flight 512 departed at 06:58 for an estimated nine-hour flight. The aircraft radioed a 100-nautical-mile position report at 07:29, and another scheduled position report at 08:29 (19°48′N 171°48′E).

When Flight 512 missed its next scheduled position report, an alert was issued by Wake Island at 10:01. An incoming aircraft reported seeing a green flare en route from Honolulu at approximately 08:41. A preliminary accident notice was filed at 16:43. Within 24 hours, a complete listing of the aircraft's passenger and crew manifest was published in a California newspaper. The United States Navy dispatched 19 ships from Pearl Harbor, including the USS Epperson and USS Walker, along with 12 US Navy P2V Neptunes.

On July 13, 1953, at 06:08, the USNS Barrett reported debris and an empty inflated life raft from Flight 512 at 19°49′N 172°25′E. Additional search support was summoned to the area. At 20:44 the Barrett reported discovering bodies in the water at 19°55′N 172°18′E and eventually 14 bodies were recovered. Eleven additional bodies were spotted but could not be recovered due to rough seas and the presence of sharks. The search was ended at 00:00 on 15 July 1953.

== Investigation ==
=== Mechanical /structural failure ===
The fuselage was not recovered; therefore conclusions about mechanical or structural failure cannot be made. The aircraft had received regular maintenance and servicing, and there were no complaints of mechanical difficulty. Based on the recovered bodies and debris, there was no evidence of fire in flight and impact occurred with great force. Maintenance and inspection records were unremarkable. (Note: A wrongful death suit was brought in California by the estate of three of the deceased passengers. The Court of Appeals affirmed the lower court’s finding that the airline and aircraft manufacturer were not liable in the crash.)

=== Fuel loading ===
The Douglas DC-6A’s design provides for the storage of fuel in the wings of the aircraft. Precise sequences for fuel loading were established by the manufacturer so as not to exceed design limitations and place excess stress on the airframe. It was determined that the fuel was properly loaded in Guam.

=== Weather ===
Another commercial aircraft flying approximately 30 miles north of the scheduled route for Flight 512 reported “an extensive thunderstorm area accompanied by heavy turbulence was encountered.” The weather briefing provided to Flight 512 prior to departure did not indicate any significant turbulence.

=== Sabotage ===
Sabotage was considered and ruled out.

=== Probable cause ===
Given the lack of physical evidence, The Civil Aeronautics Safety Bureau was unable to determine probable cause.
