= Antilles Air Boats =

Commuter airline in the US Virgin Islands

- Founded: 1963
- Ceased operations: 1981
- Hubs: Christiansted Harbor Seaplane Base
- Headquarters: Saint Thomas; U.S. Virgin Islands
- Key people: Charles F. Blair Jr., Founder; Maureen O'Hara, CEO and president (1978–1979)

Antilles Air Boats was a commuter airline founded by aviation pioneer Charles F. Blair Jr. in 1963. It was based in the US Virgin Islands. Antilles Air Boats was the second airline Blair founded, after Associated Air Transport in 1947.

== History ==
Antilles Air Boats was founded in 1963, and provided transport between St Thomas and St Croix in the US Virgin Islands as well as San Juan, Puerto Rico. Antilles Air Boats built up its fleet until it operated 27 aircraft, all propeller driven float planes from World War II which were well suited to the short hops over water the airline specialized in. In 1974 the airline purchased two Sandringham flying boats from Ansett Flying Boat Services. In 1967 the airline also acquired the last Sikorsky VS-44 "Excambian" that they operated until it was damaged in 1969. Blair had operated the same aircraft at his first airline, Associated Air Transport.

On 2 September 1978 company president Charles F. Blair Jr was killed in a crash while piloting Antilles Air Boats Flight 941, the flight was carrying 10 passengers. His then-wife, actress Maureen O'Hara, took over management of the company for six months from 1978 to 1979, becoming the first woman to become president and CEO of United States-based airline.

On March 22 1977 American Airlines founded American Inter-Island Airlines and contracted Antilles Air Boats to pilot and operate their fleet of five Convair 440s. In 1981 this airline was sold to Air Resorts.

== Destinations ==
This is a list of Antilles Air Boats destinations throughout its existence:

- Fajardo
- Saint Croix
- Saint John
- Saint Thomas
- San Juan
- Tortola
- Peter Island

== Fleet ==
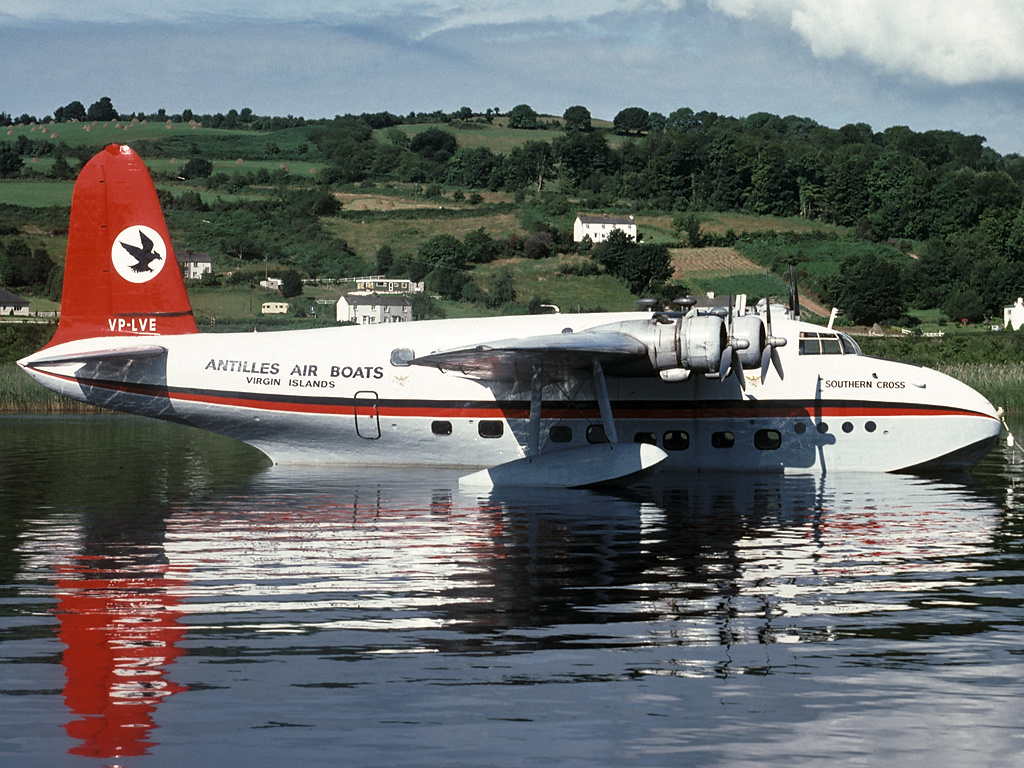
An Antilles Air Boats Short Sandringham on Lough Derg at Killalo

The fleet of Antilles Air Boats consisted of:

- Grumman G-21 Goose
- Grumman G-73 Mallard
- Short Sandringham
- Sikorsky VS-44
- Convair 440

== Accidents and incidents ==
- Nov 5, 1978: A Grumman G-21A Goose was damaged beyond repair when on a test flight on behalf of the FAA the aircraft encountered engine problems and the pilot decided to ditch the aircraft a few miles offshore.
- Sep 2, 1978: A Grumman Goose on a flight from Christiansted to Charlotte Amalie, experienced left engine failure, and the pilot, Charles F. Blair Jr. attempted to "fly the aircraft in ground effect [which was not an approved procedure] rather than attempt an open sea emergency landing..." crashing the aircraft and killing 4 including Blair.
- Jun 4, 1978: A Grumman Goose on a flight from Charlotte Amalie to Christiansted experienced engine failure in the left engine. The pilot ditched the aircraft that then struck rocks and came to rest on the shore. All 11 occupants escaped unharmed.
- Apr 5, 1978: A Grumman Goose crashed several minutes after takeoff from St. John when both engines shut down and the aircraft had to ditch in stormy conditions. All seven passengers were rescued, but both pilots were killed on impact.
- Feb 21, 1976: A Grumman Goose crashed on route to Christiansted from Charlotte Amalie, the right engine failed and the aircraft ditched with five passengers killed and the remainder rescued.
- Jun 18, 1971: A Grumman Goose experienced double engine failure while on route to Fajardo. The aircraft ditched leaving nine people injured and killing two.
- Nov 14, 1970: A Consolidated PBY-5A Catalina experienced mechanical failure while on approach to the Christiansted seaplane base. The plane diverted to Christiansted-Alexander Hamilton Airport where while landing the landing the gear collapsed. Neither pilot was injured.

== See also ==
- Charles F. Blair Jr.
- Associated Air Transport
- List of defunct airlines of the United States
