= United States Overseas Airlines =

US supplemental air carrier (1946–1964)

United States Overseas Airlines Atlantic Northern Airlines Ocean Air Tradeways
IATA	ICAO	Call sign
US^{(1)}	US^{(1)}	USOVER
- Founded: March 1946
- Commenced operations: November 1946
- Ceased operations: 24 September 1964
- Operating bases: Cape May County Airport; Oakland
- Fleet size: See Fleet
- Destinations: See Destinations
- Headquarters: Wildwood, New Jersey, United States
- Key people: Dr Ralph Cox, Jr.
- Employees: 500

Notes
- (1) IATA, ICAO codes were the same until the 1980s

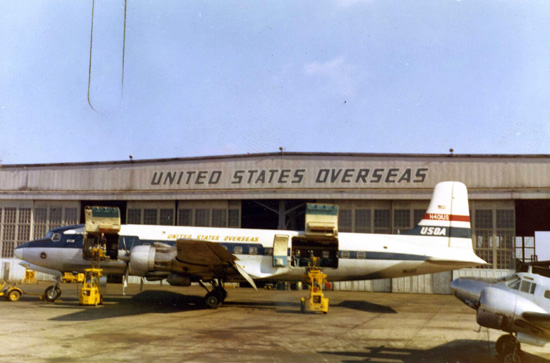
Douglas DC-6B

United States Overseas Airlines (USOA, originally Ocean Air Tradeways) was a supplemental air carrier founded and controlled by Dr. Ralph Cox Jr, a dentist turned aviator, based at Cape May County Airport in Wildwood, New Jersey, where it had a substantial operation. It was one of the larger and more capable of the supplemental airlines, also known as irregular air carriers, during a period where such airlines were not simply charter carriers but could also provide a limited amount of scheduled service.

USOA had an eventful existence. For instance, in 1948, under an earlier identity, Atlantic Northern Airlines, it transported weapons for the nascent state of Israel. A 1948 Central Intelligence Agency (CIA) report on Israeli arms acquisitions referred to the carrier as Ocean Trade Airways, a name subsequently found in a number of books and articles. Israel also briefly pressed the ANA aircraft into service to fly flag carrier El Al's first flight. In 1955, USOA rescued a Douglas DC-4 from a forced landing on frozen Hudson Bay, floating it out on pontoons over 30 miles of sea after the ice melted. A large part of USOA's business was flying military charters and operations grew to encompass scheduled flights across the Pacific to Okinawa. But in the early 1960s USOA fell into financial distress, ultimately being unable to pay employees, leading to its 1964 shuttering by the Civil Aeronautics Board (CAB), the defunct federal agency that, at the time, controlled almost all commercial air transportation in the United States.

Cox pursued USOA-related litigation for at least 14 years after the collapse of the carrier, almost as much time as the airline existed.

== History ==
=== Foundation ===
The airline originally flew as Ocean Air Tradeways (OAT), a dba for the aviation activities of Ralph Waldo Emerson Cox Jr, starting in March 1946. Cox received a dentist degree prior to World War II but became a Navy aviator during the war, after which he worked at American Overseas Airlines. Then based in Ronkonkoma, Long Island, OAT received its letter of registration (what such airlines had at the time in lieu of a certificate) from the CAB in 1947, at which time it had a single DC-4. Aviation pioneer Charles F. Blair Jr helped Cox to collect that war surplus aircraft from mostly-empty Bradley Field in Spring 1946, convert it to civilian configuration and fly its first commercial flight from New York City to Dhahran, Saudi Arabia on behalf of Aramco (including transporting Egyptian leader Mahmoud El Nokrashy Pasha to Cairo, Egypt) in November 1946. In 1947, Blair would borrow NC58021 to fly the first three trips for his own new irregular air carrier, Associated Air Transport.

=== Atlantic Northern Airlines and Israel ===
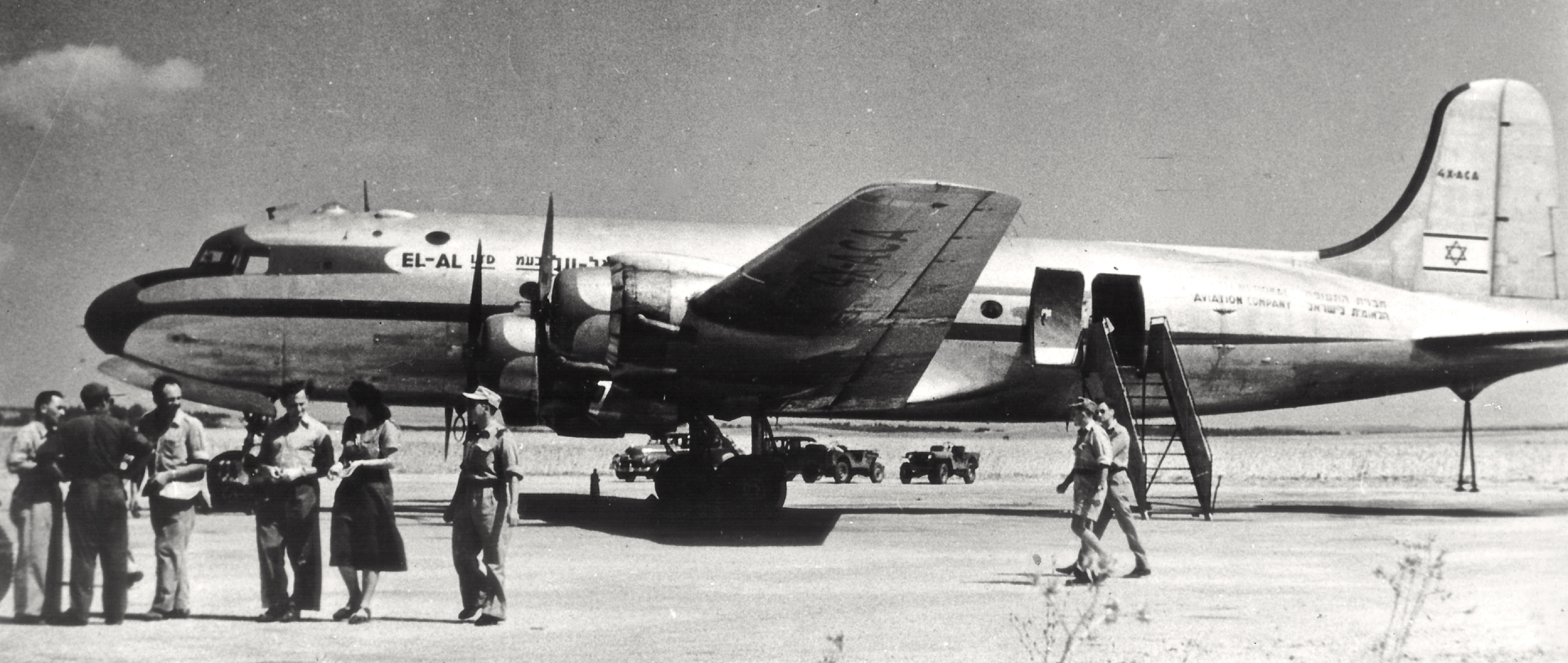
Ralph Cox's first DC-4, Ekron Airfield, Sep 1948, about the date of El Al's first flight

Atlantic Northern Airlines (ANA) was incorporated in Delaware in October 1947, and advertised headquarters both in New York City and in Maxton, North Carolina. In February 1948, ANA leased aircraft NC 58021 to the Jewish Agency for Israel (including providing crew), and flew arms from Europe to Israel in support of the 1948 Arab-Israeli War (Operation Balak). The lease was arranged by Al Schwimmer, an American engaged in smuggling aircraft to Israel in defiance of a US arms embargo; he would later go on to found what is today Israel Aerospace Industries. The contract was terminated at the end of the summer, but Israel kept the aircraft. Cox's efforts to recover the aircraft ended when the Israeli Air Force crashed it on a beach outside Tel Aviv on 2 January 1949. Cox signed a general release as part of compensation paid by an Israeli organization. But airline and aircraft lived on in a court case when ANA separately sued Schwimmer for rent allegedly due for the period the aircraft was in Israeli control. ANA lost Atlantic Northern Airlines, Inc. v. Schwimmer, but not before it went to the Supreme Court of New Jersey, which issued a decision widely cited as a precedent for the use of evidence in contracts. While in Israeli control, the aircraft was briefly given civil registration 4X-ACA to bring Israeli president Chaim Weizmann to Israel from Europe in September 1948, considered the first flight by airline El Al (see picture). In the summer of 1949, ANA advertised DC-3 service from New York City to Atlantic City and Cape May.

The activities of ANA for Israel attracted the attention of the CIA, which in a 1948 report on Israel's arms acquisition identified the carrier as "Ocean Trade Airways," (transposing "Air" and "Trade" in its name). This name is now widely found in books and articles, including some academic articles, and even historical fiction.

=== USOA ===
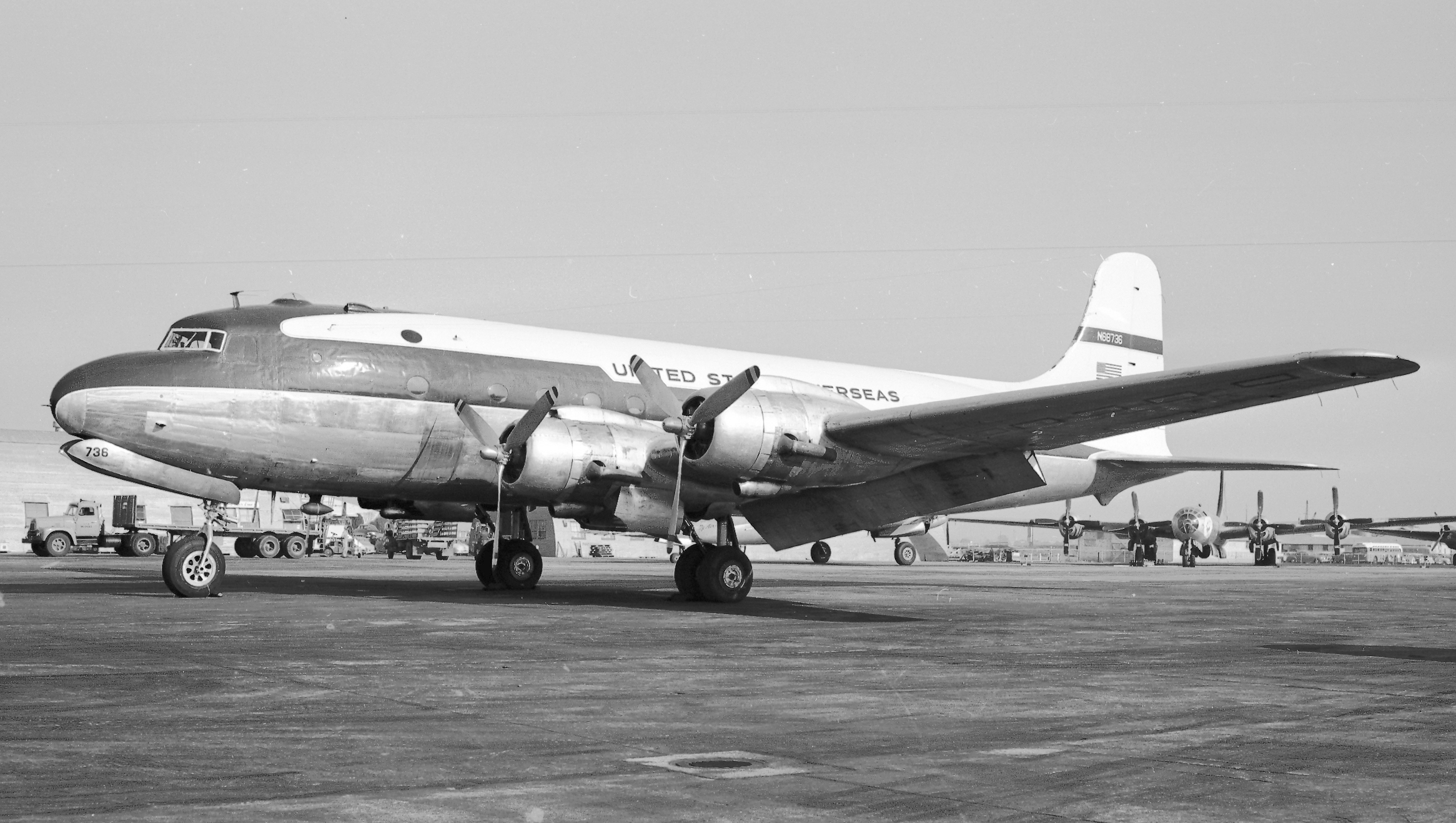
DC-4 at Oakland in 1952. Note B-29 bomber in the background

United States Overseas Airlines was incorporated in Delaware on 28 January 1949, but it was only in December 1950 that the letter of registration was transferred from OAT to USOA, making it an airline. By 1953, USOA had five DC-4 aircraft. USOA or its predecessor, OAT, participated in the Berlin Airlift, provided air transport in support of the Korean War, flew refugees from the Hungarian Revolution of 1956, what was then Belgian Congo, for the Military Air Transport Service and the Navy's domestic Quicktrans system. From the early 1950s until it started to collapse in the early 1960s, USOA was always one of the largest irregular/supplemental air carriers by revenue (see table below). In 1957, USOA was viewed as a perfectly acceptable choice but came second in the CAB case in which Trans Caribbean Airways (a smaller supplemental, but one with a better record of profitability and deeper presence in the Puerto Rico market) won a certificate to fly from New York to Puerto Rico and the Caribbean. Unfortunately for USOA, Trans Caribbean's certification turned out to be the only time the CAB ever elevated a supplemental to that status. In 1960, employment exceeded 500. As shown in the below table, peak revenue was 11.8 million dollars in 1959, equivalent to over $125 million in 2024 terms.

=== Hudson Bay and child abduction ===
In 1955, a USOA DC-4 on lease to another operator supporting construction of the Distant Early Warning Line (a Cold War radar net designed to detect Soviet bombers) in Canada's far north ran out of fuel and landed on frozen Hudson Bay. USOA collected the insurance, bought the salvage rights and rescued the aircraft. It dumped hay and sawdust around the aircraft to delay the ice melting beneath it and fastened pontoons underneath to float the aircraft once the ice did melt. USOA successfully towed the aircraft across 30 miles (48 km) of open water to Churchill, Manitoba, hauled it out, took the wings off and shipped it by rail. This gambit got wide play, featuring twice in Life magazine. See External links to see the original Life articles as well as a color video of parts of the saga. Including the cost of repairing the aircraft, however, USOA lost money.

(In a similar incident, in 1973 Alaska International Air successfully rebuilt a wrecked Lockheed L-100 Hercules on an iceberg in the Arctic Ocean.)

The mid-1950s also saw Dr Cox's marital issues intersect with USOA. In 1953, he abducted his child from his estranged wife in New York City. The child was found living in USOA's hangar at Cape May. Further, due to refusing to pay alimony, a judge awarded his wife control of the airline, which lasted six weeks until Cox could appeal. Over the next few years, Cox crossed state lines with the child twice more, moving her to Pennsylvania, and later to Mississippi, trying to find a judge to award him custody. USOA featured not only in press coverage but as a participant; for instance, the wife's divorce attorney attached a DC-4.

United States Overseas Airlines financial results, 1952–1963(1) Included in scheduled(2) All supplemental air carriers
	1952	1953	1954	1955	1956	1957	1958	1959	1960	1961	1962	1963
USD 000:												
Operating revenue	4,348	2,974	3,529	5,629	4,707	5,194	9,007	11,812	11,644	9,691	5,694	4,746
Profit (loss) before tax	717	(12)	(425)	112	(508)	324	(401)	(1,427)	151			
% of operating revenue:												
Military charter		73.9	81.3	72.4	77.7	58.2	61.8	39.4	55.2	59.3	11.6	4.6
Civilian charter		8.6	8.7	9.0	15.2	20.2	8.9	17.9	4.7	1.4	4.1	6.2
Scheduled		17.8	11.0	4.1	2.8	17.1	28.1	41.4	38.5	39.3	84.3	89.2
Other		-0.3	-1.0	14.6	4.3	4.5	1.1	1.3	1.6	^{(1)}	^{(1)}	^{(1)}
Operating revenue:												
% of industry^{(2)}	6.1	4.2	6.5	7.3	7.0	10.3	13.8	15.4	14.0			
Industry^{(2)} rank	3	5	3	4	4	3	2	2	3			

=== Collapse ===
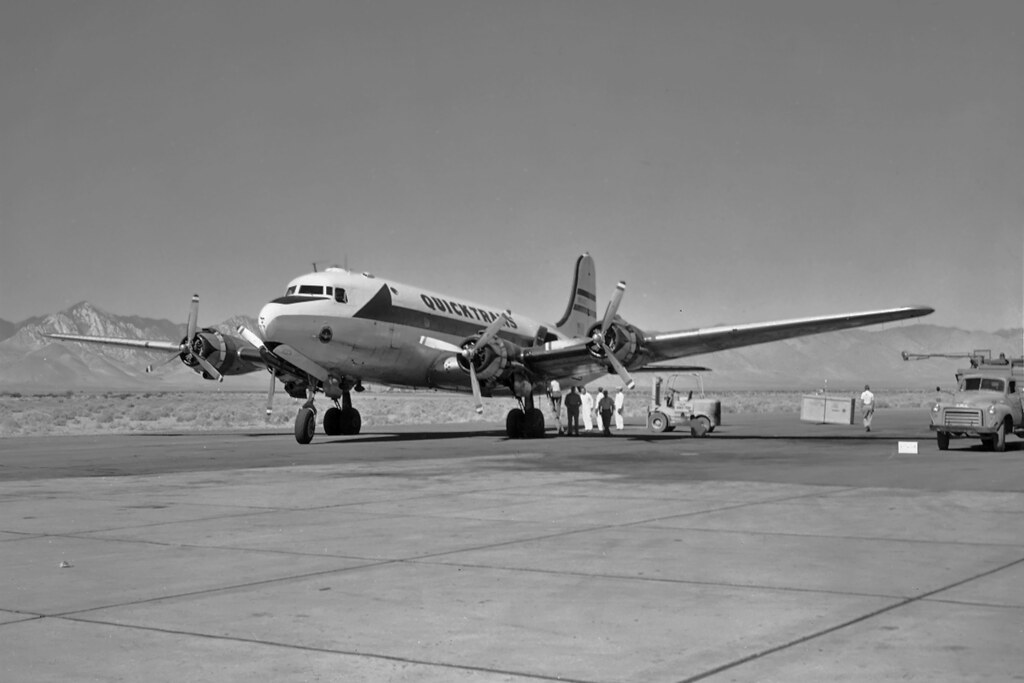
Quicktrans DC-4 China Lake 1959

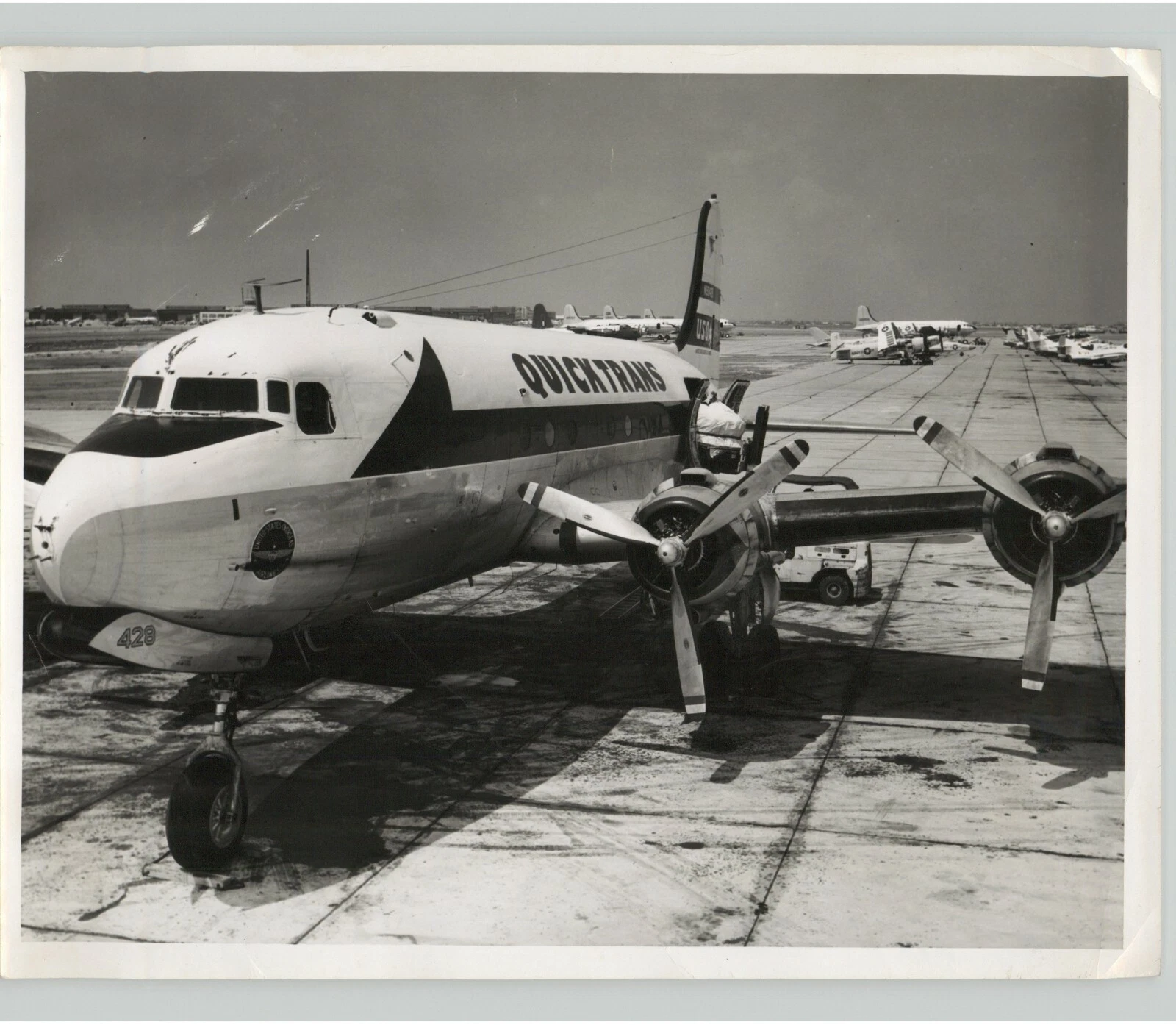
Quicktrans DC-4 Norfolk 1960

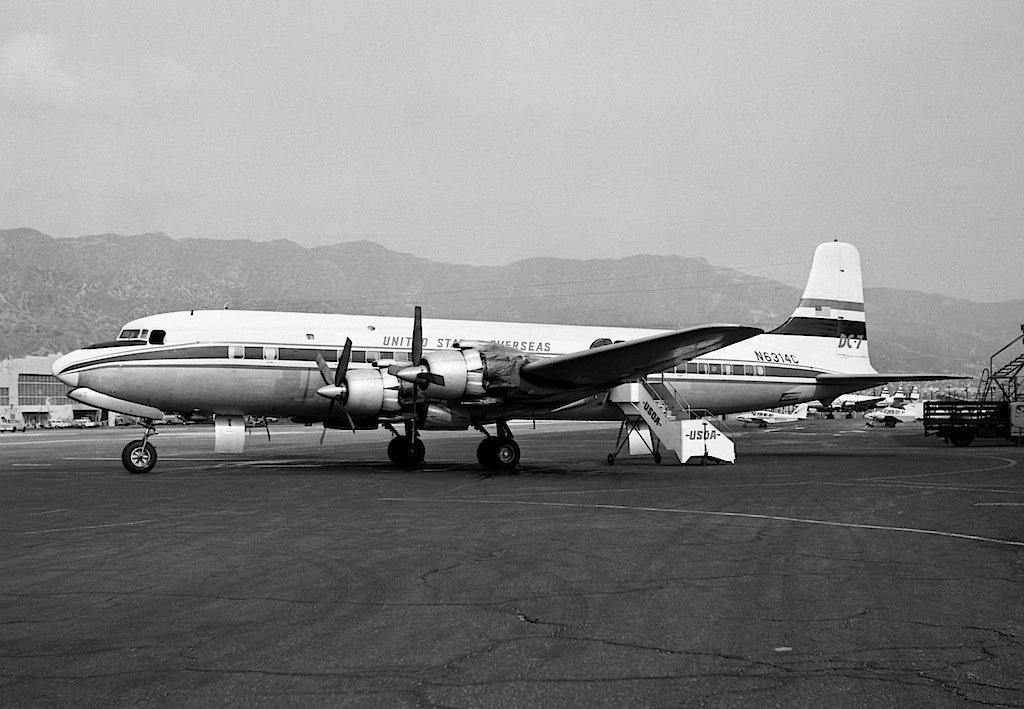
DC-7 at Burbank March 1964 in USOA's last year of operation

Relative to other supplementals, USOA was big, and had many capabilities (e.g. long-range aircraft that regularly flew across oceans; the airline also had its own airframe and engine maintenance facilities, not only in New Jersey but in Oakland), but it did not produce regular profits. USOA's financial record of the 1950s, even ignoring the large 1959 loss, was, on average, below breakeven. The January 1960 collapse of Transocean Air Lines, at one time the undisputed leader among the supplementals, did not help USOA, though it did pick up Transocean's western Pacific service that hopped from Honolulu to Wake Island to Guam to Okinawa, a low-cost alternative for American military and dependents in those parts. In 1962 the CAB noted with concern USOA's serious financial issues when certificating it on an interim basis as required by new legislation, and two of the five board members wrong a strong dissent about certificating USOA at all, based in part on poor finances. Other supplementals, such as AAXICO Airlines, produced regular profits, so USOA's issues were not a reflection of an industry-wide issue.

The situation became critical when in March 1962 USOA failed an inspection that eliminated its ability to carry military charters. This was in the wake of the 1961 Imperial Airlines Flight 201/8 crash that killed 74 soldiers, the accident report of which was damning of that supplemental carrier's competency, causing the military to inspect its airline contractors. Military charters accounted for 59% of 1961 USOA business (see table), so that was a substantial blow. USOA quickly corrected the issues and passed another inspection later in the year, but yearly contracts had already been awarded, and then USOA failed again in 1963. Ironically, in its entire history USOA never had a single passenger fatality, which set it apart from other supplementals, which, in general, had an accident rate far higher than the scheduled carriers. Note the qualification "passenger" in front of fatality. See Accidents below.

The second issue was that 39% of USOA's revenue in 1961 was from scheduled service. Such scheduled service was legally limited to 10 flights (each way) per week between any city pair. As the table above shows, that business became almost the entire of USOA's revenue in 1962 and 1963, the airline being unable to generate a significant civilian charter business. USOA tried pushing the envelope on this business to the point it was issued a cease-and-desist order by the CAB. Yet by the terms of the same 1962 legislation referenced above, supplementals (including USOA) were to lose access to that business in July 1964. The CAB did, in fact, give USOA some flexibility on this score after repeated entreaties and in recognition of its financial distress, allowing it to fly five flights per week on certain routes in 1963, while noting that the window for this business was closing. By 1964, USOA had resorted to raiding funds nominally held in trust for taxes and was failing to meet payroll or refund tickets as required. On 24 September 1964, the CAB suspended USOA's certificate for 30 days effective midnight on 25 September. An examiner recommended making it permanent after a hearing in mid-October. The airline was kept grounded while Cox appealed, and the full board ruled December 7 to revoke its certificate. The CAB noted that, just before it was shut down, USOA was achieving only a quarter of its civilian revenue projections and only one half of its military revenue projections. The CAB said USOA was "irredeemably financially unfit", its situation one of "almost complete financial collapse", its future in charter operations "verges on the hopeless."

== Legacy ==
=== Litigation ===
Dr Ralph Cox Jr. litigated the end of USOA to at least 1978 in well over a dozen major actions. His focus was asset-based lender Walter E. Heller and Company. Heller lent USOA $1.7 million in 1962, secured by USOA and related entities (all owned by Cox and his family) including a personal guarantee from Cox. USOA defaulted on the loan almost immediately, but Heller held off on foreclosing until 1965. Thereafter Cox was relentless in legal actions designed to frustrate Heller from recovery and sued Heller for hundreds of millions, alleging a grand conspiracy. Heller finally won a 1974 injunction preventing further litigation by Cox or any related party. The judge said in part, about Cox and his Heller-related legal actions:

I find, without reservation or equivocation, that Cox instituted each and every one of them in bad faith. He has added an unusual talent for lying to his contempt for the judicial process. His imagination in exploiting the courts as a means of harassing, intimidating and impeding Heller in the collection of its money is truly spectacular.

Despite the injunction, Cox funded further litigation (albeit without his overt participant as a plaintiff), which a California appeals court rejected in 1978.

In 1977, there were a dozen derelict USOA aircraft at Cape May County Airport being cut up for scrap.

=== Deregulation ===
In January 1979, following passage of the 1978 Airline Deregulation Act, the CAB awarded supplemental airlines World Airways and Capitol Air scheduled authority on the New York City/Washington DC to Los Angeles/San Francisco markets. Ralph Cox dba United States Overseas Airlines applied in the same proceeding, which the CAB denied on the basis that USOA made no attempt to show it was fit: no operating plan, no finance plan, nothing. However, the Board encouraged Cox (and several other supplemental veterans) to show they had the wherewithall to operate an airline. To which Cox, et al, said, among other things, that Capitol and World should be denied because they were CIA fronts. The Board said it looked at everything that had been submitted, even material previously excluded by the administrative law judge as irrelevant, and found "no substantial evidence to support the petitioners' strong-worded accusations."

== Fleet ==
As of October 1948, Atlantic Northern had two aircraft:

- 2 DC-4

As of its interim certification in 1962, USOA had 14 aircraft:

- 8 DC-4
- 6 DC-6

The company acquired DC-7s by 1964, as shown in the picture above and in a 1964 timetable.

== Destinations ==
From a 1961 USOA timetable:

- New York
- Chicago
- Detroit
- Guam
- Honolulu
- Las Vegas
- Los Angeles
- Miami
- New York
- Okinawa
- San Francisco
- Wake Island

== Accidents ==
- 13 May 1957: DC-4 N68736 was returning to Narsarsuaq Air Base in Greenland from a Distant Early Warning Line site in white-out conditions and hit the ice cap at 5,900 ft in an area where the chart indicated the altitude was 5,000 ft. Two crew died, the seriously injured first officer was rescued.
- 15 October 1959: C-54G N4000A on a US Navy Quicktrans domestic cargo flight departed Naval Air Station Jacksonville and reached 1,400 ft when engine 4 surged. The crew eventually requested a return to NAS Jacksonville, when engine 3 and then engine 2 surged. Aircraft descended rapidly, ditched in a small lake, but hit trees on the way down and a fire resulted. Crew was seriously injured but swam ashore, aircraft destroyed. Cause was crew confusion. Two different fuel tank configurations in the fleet resulted in crew mistakenly selecting near-empty gas tanks.

== See also ==
- Supplemental air carrier
- List of defunct airlines of the United States
