= Charles F. Blair Jr. =

United States aviator and military officer (1909–1978)

- Born: July 19, 1909; Buffalo, New York, U.S.
- Died: September 2, 1978 (aged 69); St. Thomas, Virgin Islands
- Burial place: Arlington National Cemetery
- Spouses: 4, including Janice Evelyn Davis (m. 1932, divorced) Mae E. Gallmoyer (m. 1953; div. 1965) Maureen O'Hara (m. 1968)
- Children: 4
- Military career
- Allegiance: United States of America
- Branch: United States Navy; United States Air Force
- Service years: 1932–1960
- Rank: Captain (USN); Brigadier general (USAF)
- Conflicts: World War II
- Awards: Harmon Trophy
- Other work: Pan American World Airways; Antilles Air Boats

Charles F. Blair Jr. (July 19, 1909 – September 2, 1978) was an American aviation pioneer who helped work out the routes and navigation techniques necessary for long-distance flights. He served as a reserve officer, early in his career for the United States Navy, reaching the rank of captain, and later for the United States Air Force, reaching the rank of brigadier general. He died in a transportation accident in the Caribbean while captaining a Grumman Goose seaplane for his airline, Antilles Air Boats.

== Life and career ==
Blair was born in Buffalo, New York. He learned to fly in San Diego and made his first solo flight at the age of 19. In 1931, he earned a Bachelor of Science degree in mechanical engineering from the University of Vermont, and the following year was commissioned an Ensign as a naval aviator and served in the Naval Reserve, attaining the rank of Lieutenant while serving a tour as a fighter pilot. He remained in the Naval Reserve in the prewar years while taking jobs as a pilot. He flew for Boeing Air Transport and stayed with Boeing for seven years. In 1940, Blair became a chief pilot at American Export Airlines, later renamed American Overseas Airlines (AOA), where he trained the pilots.

With the United States' entry into World War II, Blair was called into active duty and flew with the Naval Air Transport Service, reaching the rank of captain. He also did work with the Air Transport Command, as well as serving as a test pilot for Grumman Aircraft. With the Naval Transport Service he flew flying boats across the Atlantic to Foynes, Ireland. On one return trip, flying the Sikorsky VS-44, he passed up his refueling station on Newfoundland and continued on to New York. Arriving there after 25 hours and 45 minutes in the air, he was the first to carry passengers and mail on a non-stop flight across the Atlantic Ocean in a flying boat, long after a number of dirigibles. As a Grumman test pilot he worked on projects that became the Grumman F6F Hellcat, Grumman F7F Tigercat, Grumman F8F Bearcat and the Martin Mars flying boat.

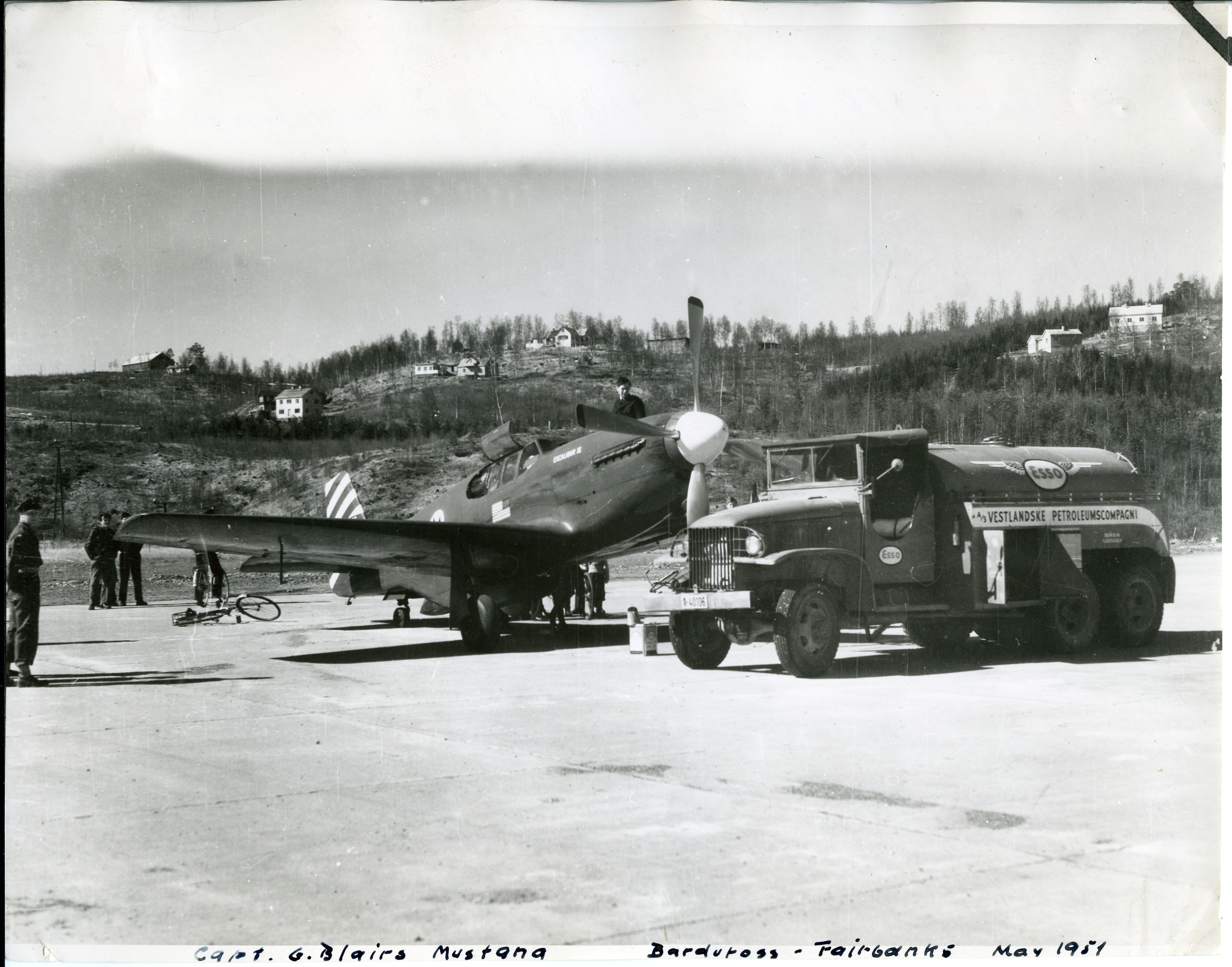
Cap. C. Blair's Mustang being refueled at Bardufoss Airport before taking off on the flight from Bardufoss to Fairbanks.

Following the war, Blair was placed in charge of flight testing the Lockheed Constellation and the Boeing Stratocruiser airliners for AOA, and he oversaw their introduction on the new transatlantic routes. While working for AOA he started his own small airline, Associated Air Transport (see Airlines below). In 1950 AOA merged with Pan American World Airways. Blair was hired on as a Chief Pilot at Pan Am.

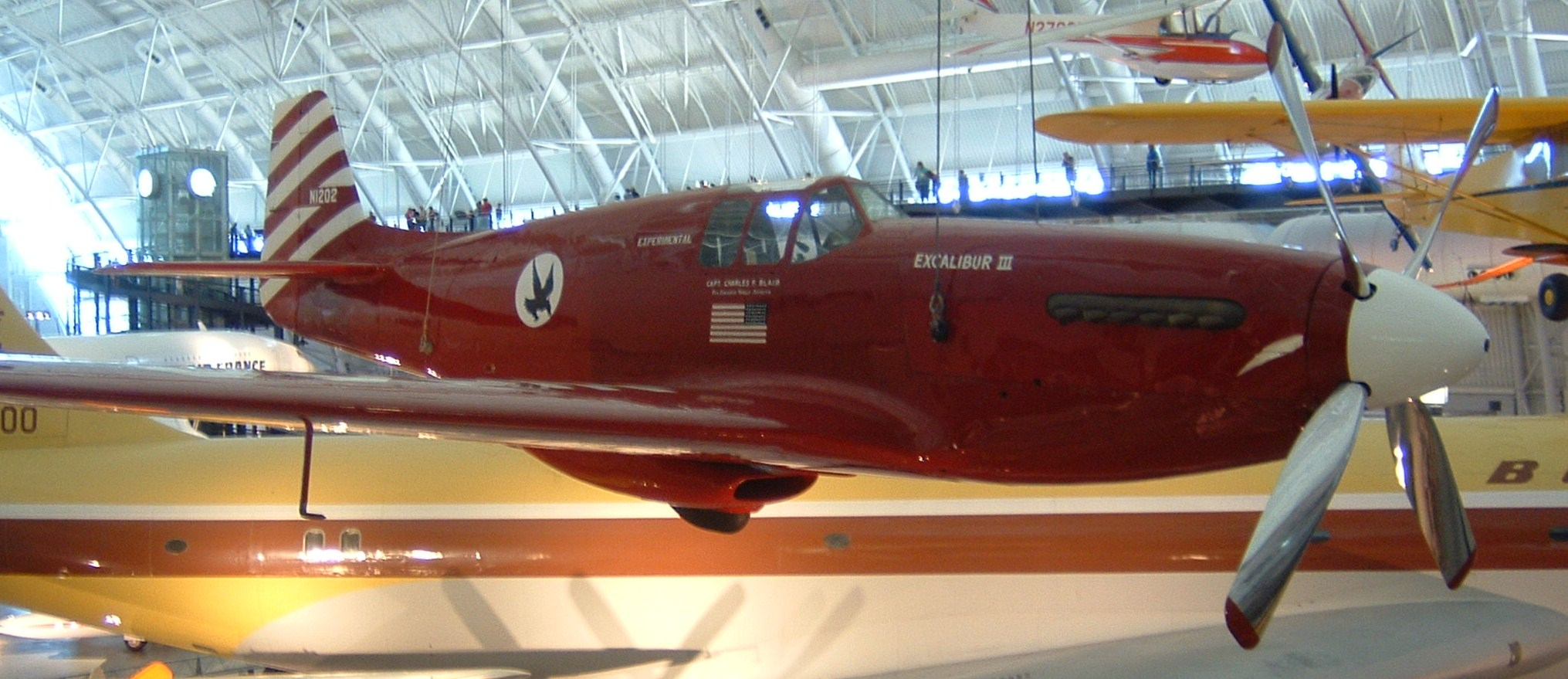
Charles Blair's Excalibur III on display at the Steven F. Udvar-Hazy Center (NASM)

In 1950 Pan American World Airways purchased a P-51 Mustang to allow Blair a chance to attempt a new long-distance record. A P-51C equipped with long-range internal fuel tanks, the aircraft had been flown by Paul Mantz, winning the transcontinental Bendix Trophy air races in 1946 and 1947, and finishing second in 1948 and third in 1949. Rechristening the plane "Stormy Petrel" and then "Excalibur III", Blair began setting records. On January 31, 1951, Blair flew nonstop from New York to London to test the jet stream, traveling 3,478 miles (5,597 km) at an average speed of 446 miles per hour (718 km/h) in seven hours and 48 minutes, setting a record for a piston engine plane. On May 29 of the same year he flew from Bardufoss, Norway, to Fairbanks, Alaska, flying 3260 nonstop miles across the North Pole. Captain Blair was awarded the Harmon Trophy from President Truman. That same year he was also awarded the Gold Medal of the Norwegian Aero Club. The Excalibur III is now on display at the Steven F. Udvar-Hazy Center.

Blair resigned his naval commission in 1952. Attracted by his pioneering work in long-range flights, the Air Force invited him to act as a consultant. In April 1953 he accepted a commission in the Air Force Reserve with the rank of colonel. For the next 15 years he split his time flying between Pan Am and the Air Force. In 1956 Blair led three F-84Fs in a flight across the Atlantic Ocean, using in-air refueling. In 1959 he was promoted to brigadier general. Two weeks after his promotion he led a flight of two F-100 Super Sabres in a nonstop flight from England to Alaska, routing the flight over the North Pole. Blair was awarded the Distinguished Flying Cross for this achievement.

Brigadier General Blair became a consultant to the National Aeronautics and Space Administration in 1962. In 1963 he founded Antilles Air Boats (see Airlines below), which absorbed his attention once he retired from Pan Am six years later. He co-wrote a novel with A.J Wallis in 1956, Thunder Above, which was filmed as Beyond the Curtain. In 1960 he published Red Ball in the Sky, an autobiography highlighting his adventures in flight (see Bibliography for a link). It was expanded and re-published min 1952, 1957, 1969 and in 1970.

== Airlines ==
Blair founded two airlines and helped a friend start a third.

=== United States Overseas Airlines ===
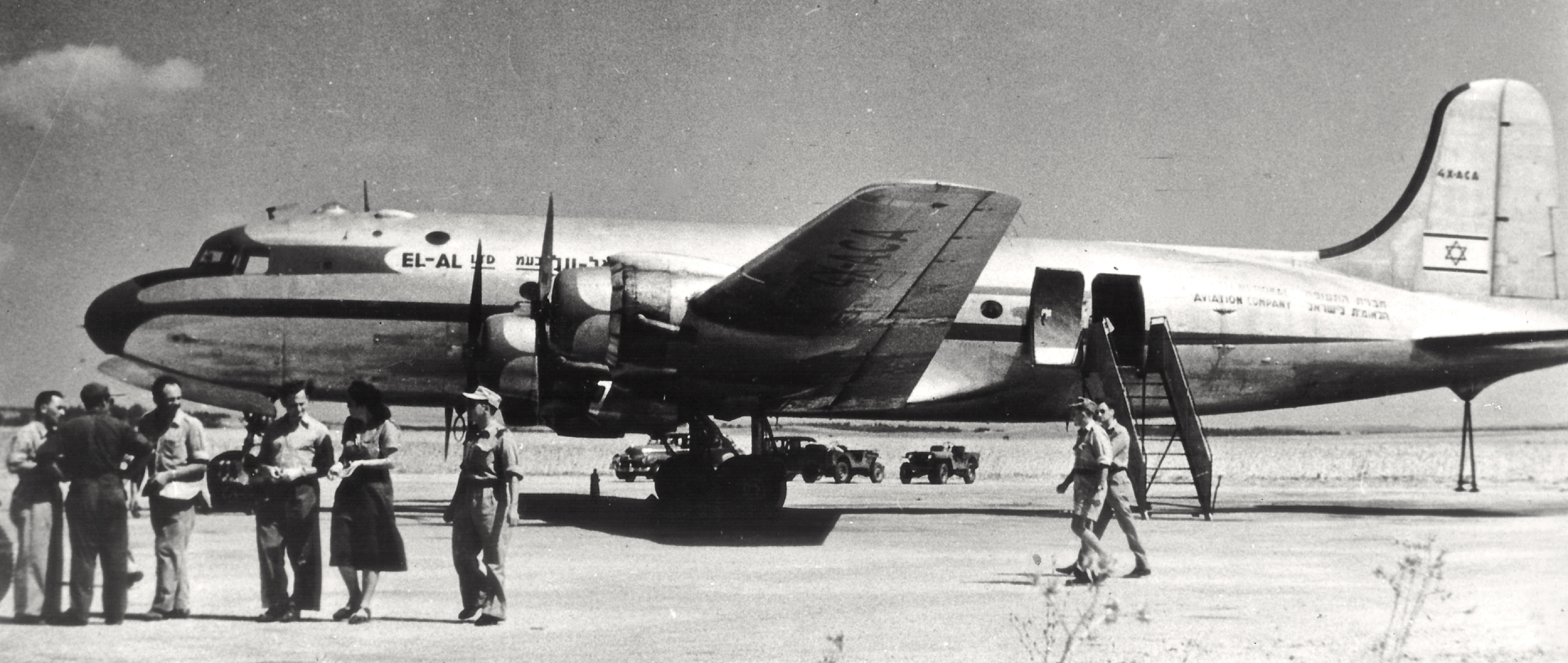
NC58021, with which Blair helped found United States Overseas Airlines (USOA), in 1948 when it operated El Al's first flight

In Spring 1946, Blair helped a friend, Dr. Ralph Cox, to collect a war surplus DC-4 from Bradley Field, to convert it to civilian configuration (registration NC58021) and later its first commercial flight from New York City to Dhahran, Saudi Arabia, on behalf of Aramco (including transporting Egyptian leader Mahmoud El Nokrashy Pasha to Cairo, Egypt) in November 1946. This was the genesis of United States Overseas Airlines, the airline that Cox ran through the 1960s.

=== Associated Air Transport ===
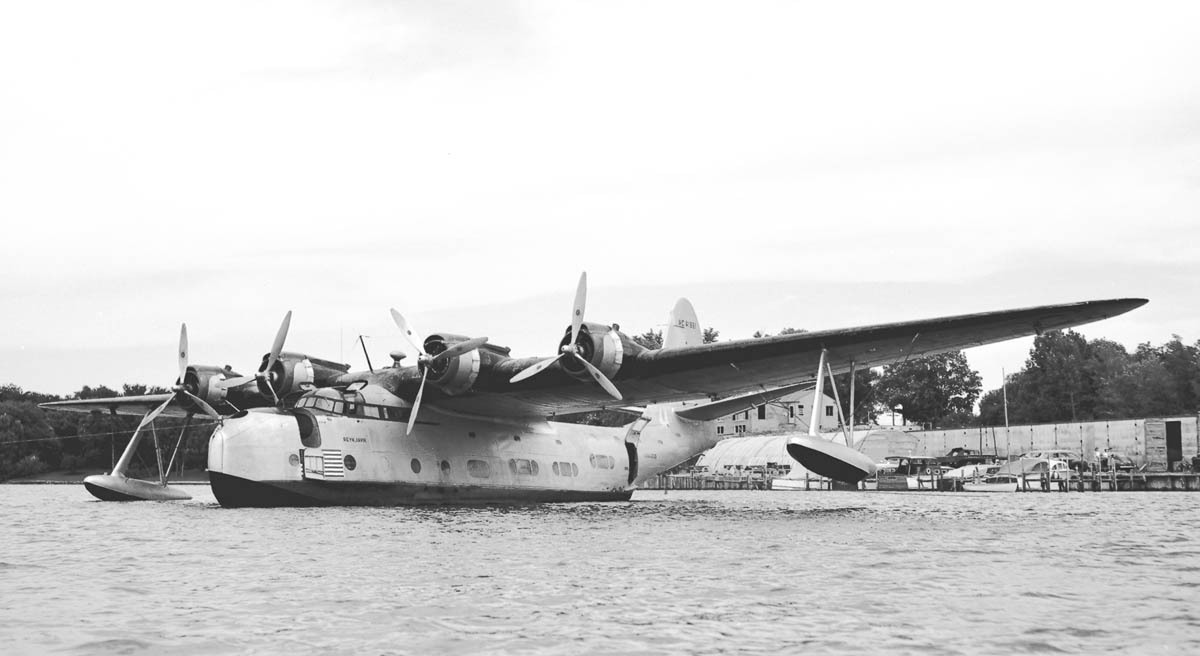
Associated Air Transport's first aircraft, Sikorsky VS-44 "Reykjavik"

In 1947, Blair contracted to fly 300 construction workers from Minneapolis to Keflavik, Iceland. Blair knew of the opportunity because he regularly visited Keflavik as a pilot for AOA. He called the new venture "Associated Air Transport" (AAT) because he saw it as auxiliary to his AOA job. Blair borrowed NC85021 for the first three trips. But NC85021 was busy so Blair leased a Sikorsky VS-44 flying boat which he named "Reykjavik" after the mission. Associated flew the aircraft from Lake Minnetonka near Minneapolis to Iceland via a refueling stop in Newfoundland.

Blair subsequently acquired a war surplus Curtiss C-46 for $5000 (about $75,000 in 2026 dollars) and spent $45,000 to convert it to civilian configuration (including an extra gas tank for longer range). Blair leased out the aircraft for a time before flying it directly as AAT. The New York City-based airline became an irregular air carrier and for two years Blair sent the aircraft wherever there was business, including transporting migrants from Puerto Rico to New York, freshly-killed beef to market in South America, and displaced people from Europe to Israel. He sold the C-46 in early 1950 and passed the airline to other owners, turning his attention to the P-51.

=== Antilles Air Boats ===
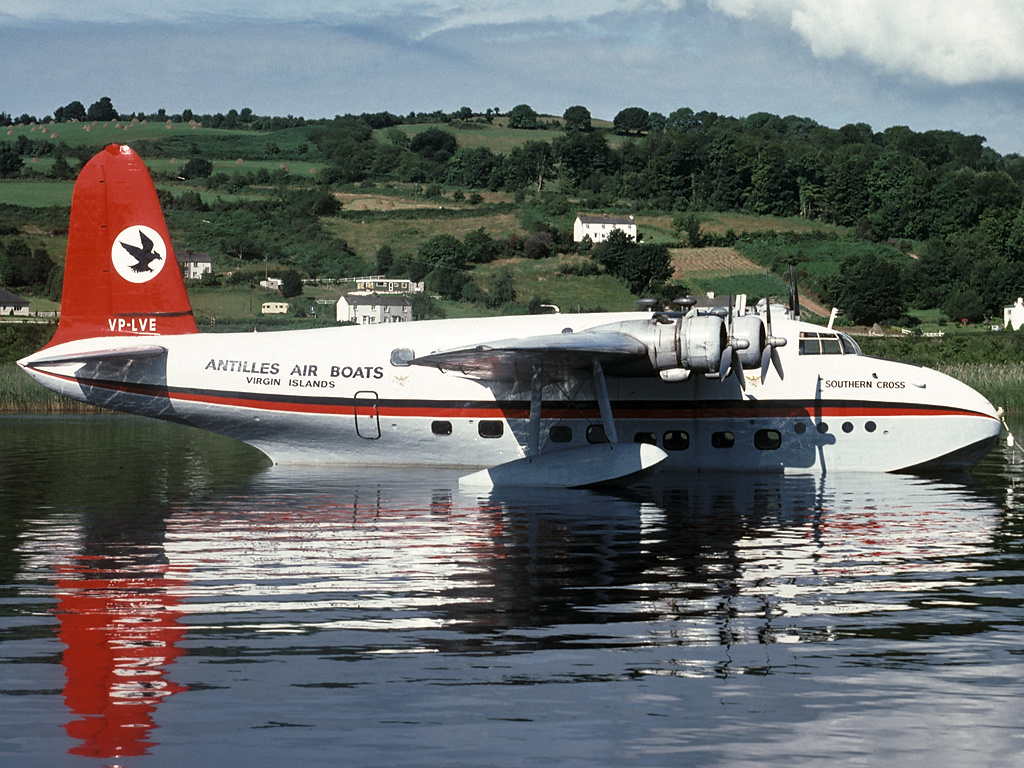
Antilles Air Boats Short Sandringham 1977

Blair started Antilles Air Boats in 1963, which provided transport between St Thomas and St Croix in the US Virgin Islands as well as San Juan, Puerto Rico. He slowly built Antilles Air Boats up until it operated 27 aircraft, all propeller-driven flying boats from the war years which were well suited to the short hops over water the airline specialized in. In 1974 Blair purchased two Sandringham flying boats from Ansett Airlines that had serviced the Sydney-to-Lord Howe Island route. In 1967 he also acquired the last Sikorsky VS-44 "Excambian" that Antilles operated until it was damaged in 1969. In 1976 the Blairs donated it to the National Naval Aviation Museum.

== Personal life ==
Blair was married 4 times.

After joining the U.S. Navy, then Ensign Blair married Janice Evelyn Davis in Wallingford, Vermont on September 6, 1932. They had two children. They would later divorce.

Blair's second marriage from 1953 to 1965 was to Mae E. Gallmoyer commonly known as Flip Blair who lived in Farmington, Connecticut. She was born in Topton, Pennsylvania, enrolled in active duty as a WAVE in the U.S. Navy during World War II and later served as a stewardess for Arabian American Oil Company, American Airlines, and Pan American World Airways. She was an extensive traveler visiting many countries throughout the world including China shortly after the country opened tourism to U.S. citizens. Later in her career she worked as a travel agent arranging trips for many prominent people and held positions at Lindblad Travel and Tauck Tours. The marriage produced two children.

On March 11, 1968, Charles Blair was married for the fourth time, to the actress Maureen O'Hara, whom he had first met on a flight to Ireland in 1947.

Blair's brother Robert Noel Blair was a painter and art teacher, in Buffalo, NY, noted for his Battle of the Bulge paintings, executed during combat.

== Death ==
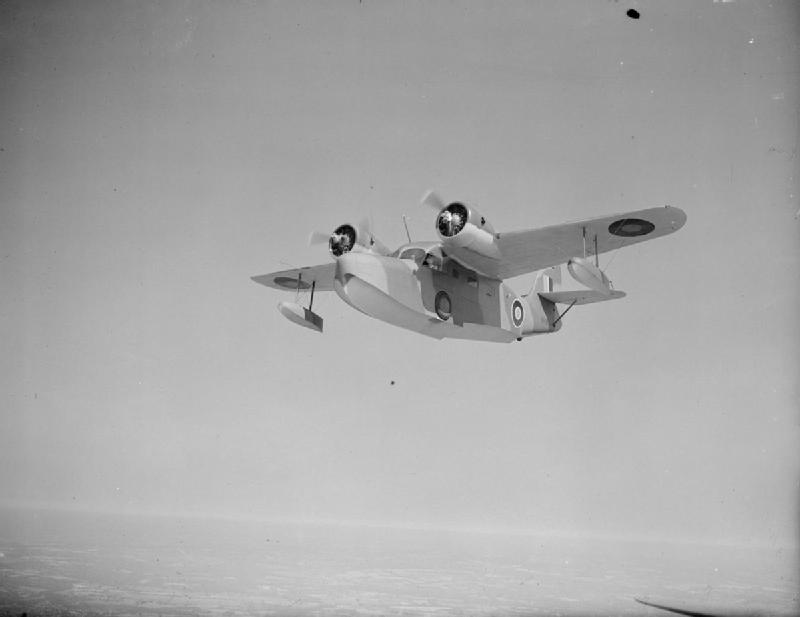
A Grumman G-21 similar to the one Blair was flying on the day of his accident

On September 2, 1978, Blair was piloting a Grumman G21 "Goose" on Antilles Air Boats Flight 941, a routine passenger flight traveling north from St. Croix to St. Thomas. The sole pilot, Blair was carrying 10 passengers, including a 13-year-old boy who was seated next to Blair in the co-pilot's seat. Near the end of the short flight the port engine suffered catastrophic failure. The piston of the No. 5 cylinder broke, causing the cylinder to break loose from its mounting. The cylinder struck the engine cowling, breaking it off its mountings on the port nacelle. Blair was 5 mi (8.0 km) out from St Thomas, flying at 1,700 feet. He immediately feathered his port propeller and shut down the engine, while adding power to the starboard in an attempt to maintain level flight. The plane should have been able to maintain its altitude on one engine, but in the event the aircraft began losing height. Blair notified the St. Thomas tower that he had lost an engine, and that he would need assistance. When the tower responded Blair said he would land in the protected waters of the West Gregerie Channel, and he requested a boat to pick up his passengers. Overhearing the calls, a second Antilles Air Boats aircraft that happened to be in the vicinity approached from above and gained visual contact. The sea was rough, with a 15- to 20-knot wind from the southeast generating whitecaps and swells of 5 to 6 feet.

Blair was unable to maintain level flight on the single functioning engine and was losing 300 to 400 feet of altitude a minute. There were two main reasons for this: the propeller mounted to the starboard engine had suffered from pitting and corrosion. The maintenance crew had resurfaced it to remove the defects, but the aerodynamic shape of the propeller had not been maintained. In addition, the separated cowling on the port side caused a marked increase in drag.

Though losing altitude, Blair believed he could still fly the plane. He anticipated gaining extra lift from the ground effect off the water once he got down on the deck. Among the pilots at Antilles Air Boats the broadly held belief was if they were limited to one engine they would not go down, as they could use ground effect to stay aloft. Their collective faith in this concept was documented in the company's papers. Though real, the added lift of ground effect is less robust if the surface is irregular.

Blair did not give emergency instructions to the passengers nor did he tell them to prepare for a water landing. It appeared he had rejected this idea and set his sights on getting the aircraft closer to shore. He never turned the plane into the wind. He never reduced power nor lowered flaps. The wind coming from the southeast provided a considerable tailwind to Blair's aircraft, increasing his speed relative to the surface of the water. Blair focused on keeping the aircraft in the air. It soon proved he was unable to do so. The plane contacted the chopped conditions of the ocean's surface at a high speed, with the starboard wing low. Bounding off the first contact, it traveled 3 or 4 plane lengths in the air and then came back down. When it did the float on the port wing buried itself in the water. The plane cartwheeled around it and into the ocean, breaking apart and settling upside down in the water. It sank in a matter of minutes. No one was killed from the impact of the crash, but Blair and three of his passengers drowned. The aircraft settled to the bottom in 85 ft (26 m) of water. Surviving passengers were soon picked up by local boats. One passenger suffered a compression fracture to his first lumbar vertebra. All the rest suffered minor cuts and bruises.

=== NTSB findings in the investigation of the accident ===
After its investigation, the NTSB concluded that pre-flight planning was improper because the maintenance release was falsified by a licensed mechanic. The mechanic had certified the aircraft as airworthy when, in fact, it was not. The plane was flown 22 hrs beyond the scheduled inspection time with the knowledge of certain key managers, supervisors, and licensed personnel.

The total times in the aircraft logbook had been falsified with the full knowledge of management, supervisors, and licensed personnel. Company policy and decisions were made by Blair, who violated or condoned violation of the regulations in the interest of company objectives.

The left engine failed when the No. 5 cylinder and piston separated from the engine, causing the engine cowl to separate. That engine was not airworthy because it had been in storage for 10 years before it was installed on the accident plane. The added drag caused by the loss of the cowling, combined with the decreased efficiency of the improperly maintained right propeller, combined with the over-weight condition of the aircraft—which resulted from a deficient FAA supplemental type certificate—made it impossible to maintain level single-engine flight.

"The probable cause of the accident was the inability of the aircraft to sustain single-engine flight and the captain's decision to attempt to fly the aircraft in ground effect [which was not an approved procedure] rather than attempt an open sea emergency landing."

"Contributing to the accident were the company's inadequate maintenance program, the management influence which resulted in the disregard of Federal Aviation Regulations and FAA-approved company maintenance policies, inadequate FAA surveillance of the airline, and deficient enforcement procedures."

"Contributing to the fatalities in this survivable accident was the captain's failure to brief passengers properly on emergency procedures."

After the engine failed, the captain did not warn or brief the passengers concerning life vests, emergency exits, or the developing situation. Consequently, no passengers made use of the life vests stored under each seat. Additionally, the captain failed to extend the flaps and failed to turn the plane into the wind. Those failures resulted in the plane impacting the ocean with almost twice the kinetic energy that would have been otherwise generated, causing the plane to break up and rapidly sink.

== Legacy ==
Blair flew flying boats into Foynes, Ireland from 1942 to 1945. Foynes' sheltered inlet made for a good operation area for flying boats, and it was the last port of call on Ireland's western shore. As a result, Foynes became one of the biggest civilian airports in Europe during World War II. Blair was the first pilot to make the transatlantic flight from the U.S. to Foynes carrying passengers and mail. On July 8, 1989, his widow, Maureen O'Hara, cut the opening ceremony ribbon for the Foynes Flying Boat and Maritime Museum. She also presided over the Grand Reopening and Expansion of the Flying Boats Museum in 2006. O'Hara had been asked to be the museum's patron. She accepted, and served in this capacity from its opening until her death in 2015.

O'Hara donated her late husband's flying boat (Sikorsky VS-44A) "The Queen of the Skies" to the National Museum of Naval Aviation and it was subsequently given on permanent loan to the New England Air Museum in Connecticut.

A reproduction of Blair's red P-51 used to be displayed on the roof of the Queen's Building at Heathrow airport.

Blair's Sandringham Flying boat VP-LVE "Southern Cross" has been the center piece of the Southampton Hall of Aviation since 1984. The plane has been restored to appear as it did for Ansett Flying Boat Services, with registration number VH-BRC and the name "Beachcomber".

The Seaplane terminal located at The Charlotte Amalie Harbor Seaplane Base was dedicated in his honor.

Blair and Maureen O'Hara are buried at Arlington National Cemetery in Arlington, Virginia.

== Bibliography ==
- Blair, Charles F. Jr (1969). Red Ball in the Sky. New York: Random House. ISBN 9780091039103.
- Wickstead, Maurice (2017). "A Sky Full of Frontiers: Charles F. Blair - A Life in Aviation". The Aviation Historian (20): 98–108. ISSN 2051-1930.
