= Associated Air Transport =

US supplemental air carrier (1947–1962)

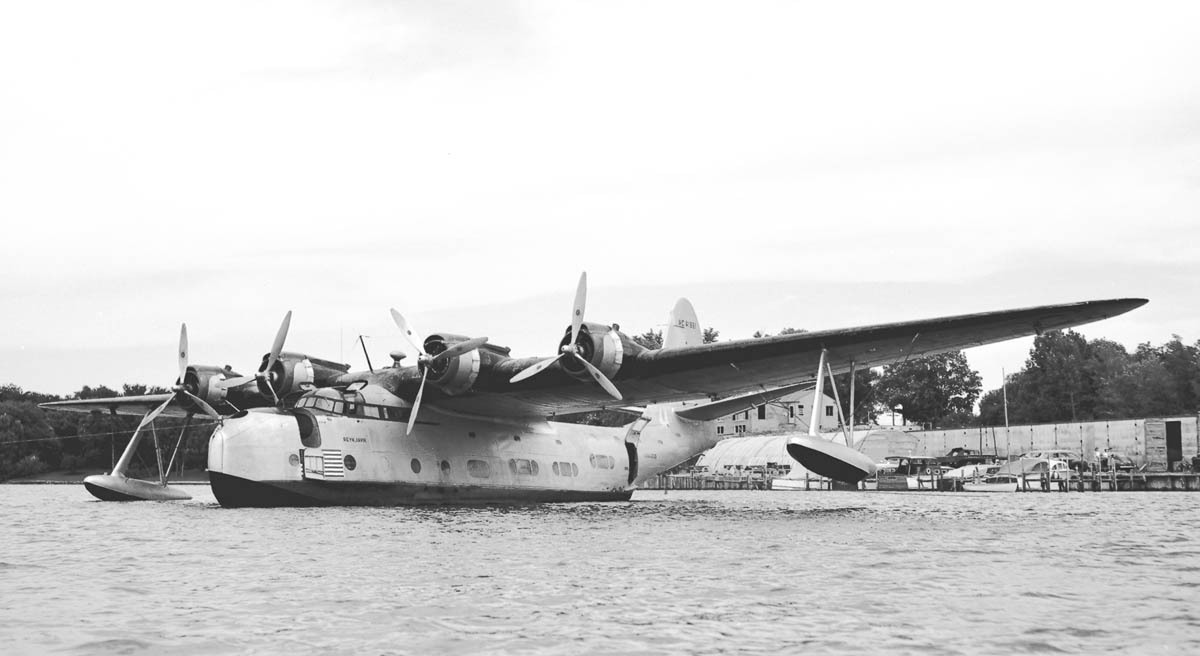
- AAT's first aircraft, VS-44 "Reykjavik," 1947, likely at Lake Minnetonka near Minneapolis
IATA	ICAO	Call sign
KS^{(1)}	KS^{(1)}	ASSOCIATED
- Founded: December 1946 incorporated in Delaware
- Commenced operations: 1947
- Ceased operations: October 23, 1962
- Fleet size: See Fleet
- Destinations: See Destinations
- Headquarters: New York, New York; San Antonio, Texas; Miami, Florida; United States
- Key people: Douglas T. Bell; John V. Weesner
- Founder: Charles F. Blair Jr.

Notes
- (1) IATA, ICAO codes were the same until the 1980s

Associated Air Transport (AAT) was an irregular air carrier (later known as a supplemental air carrier) founded by aviation pioneer Charles F. Blair Jr. in 1947 (Blair later founded a second airline, Antilles Air Boats). Blair is better known for record-setting flights in the decade or two after World War II, such as flying a North American P-51 (now displayed in the Smithsonian Institution) at high altitude in the jet stream nonstop from New York to London in January 1951, setting a speed record for reciprocating-engine propeller aircraft that still stands. AAT's first aircraft was a flying boat, (in this case a Sikorsky VS-44) one of only a few airlines founded after World War II with that distinction (another was World Airways).

The airline suffered a high profile fatal crash in 1953 under its third owner. Its fourth owner initially expanded it successfully in the late 1950s, before a change in strategy derailed financials. In late 1961, another supplemental carrier suffered a crash that killed many US soldiers, resulting in a government crackdown. AAT had several non-fatal crashes the prior few years, drawing attention. The government suspended AAT's operations in March 1962, briefly restored them under a fifth ownership group (that included a Hollywood actor), then pulled them for the last time in October.

See External links for photos of AAT aircraft and an AAT logo.

== History ==
=== Blair era ===
In 1947, Blair contracted to fly 300 construction workers from Minneapolis to Keflavik, Iceland. Blair knew of the opportunity because he regularly visited Keflavik as a pilot for American Overseas Airline (AOA). He called the new venture "Associated Air Transport" because he saw it as auxiliary to his AOA job. Blair first flew three trips with Douglas DC-4 registration number NC85021 belonging to Ocean Air Tradeways, (later known as United States Overseas Airlines), a war surplus aircraft he had helped convert to civilian configuration. But NC85021 was busy so Blair leased a Sikorsky VS-44 flying boat (a type he flew in World War II) which he named "Reykjavik" after the mission. Associated flew the aircraft from Lake Minnetonka near Minneapolis to Iceland via a refueling stop in Newfoundland.

Blair subsequently acquired a war surplus Curtiss C-46 for $5000 (about $75,000 in 2026 dollars) and spent $45,000 to convert it to civilian configuration (including an extra gas tank for longer range). Blair leased out the aircraft for a time before flying it directly as AAT. The New York City-based airline became an irregular air carrier and for two years Blair sent the aircraft wherever there was business, including transporting migrants from Puerto Rico to New York, freshly-killed beef to market in South America, and displaced people from Europe to Israel. He sold the C-46 in early 1950, turning his attention to the P-51.

Table 1: Associated Air Transport financial results, 1950–1962(1) Nine months ending September(2) All supplemental air carriers
	1950	1951	1952	1953	1954	1955	1956	1957	1958	1959	1960	1961	1962^{(1)}
Operating revenue:													
Military charter				367	222	73	0	319	502	812	645	163	0
Civilian charter				12	10	0	44	23	182	289	466	15	19
Scheduled				20	8	0	0	0	0	36	44	940	543
Other				0	0	8	20	13	6	15	4	2	5
Total	33	309	480	399	240	81	64	355	690	1,152	1,159	1,120	567
Op profit/(loss)	1	5	5	(8)	(3)	1	4	(19)	(2)	43	(40)	(131)	(170)
Net profit/(loss)	0	0	0	(5)	(8)	22	(22)	(19)	(4)	20	(81)	(144)	(108)
Operating revenue:													
% of industry^{(2)}	0.1	0.5	0.7	0.6	0.4	0.1	0.1	0.7	1.1	1.5	1.4	1.3	NA
Industry^{(2)} rank	50	20	38	37	32	40	41	20	15	8	15	19	NA

=== Weesner ===
As Table 1 indicates, AAT operated minimally in 1950, but new owners resuscitated it in 1951 and moved it to San Antonio, building it up to two C-46s before selling it at the end of 1952 to John V. Weesner. The CAB had just removed Weesner from Lake Central Airlines (LCA). LCA was a local service carrier, a form of regional airline that depended on government subsidies; Weesner-affiliated entities overcharged LCA, increasing its subsidy. Weesner's tenure at AAT started with a high profile crash that killed 37 soldiers on a military charter (see Accidents; External links has a picture of the sistership to the one that crashed, taken in the same month). Weesner got out of AAT in 1955 in favor of the propane gas business. AAT stopped operating in July and did not resume until September 1956 with a single C-46, under new ownership and management, the president and controlling interest being Douglas T. Bell, who had a prior career at other supplemental carriers. The CAB was in the midst of a large investigation of supplemental air carriers, as part of which it approved AAT's new owners/managers; a key CAB criterion was that Weesner have no further connection.

=== Bell and Imperial ===
Bell successfully expanded AAT from 1957 thru 1960, not just in the number of aircraft, but also capability. By 1959, AAT acquired three "Super 46" aircraft (one of several upgrade programs for the C-46 that became available in the mid-1950s that made the aircraft faster, safer and able to carry more weight). The airline also added Douglas DC-4s to its fleet and in 1961, a Lockheed L-749 Constellation (see Fleet). The airline also, for the first time, developed a significant civilian charter business (see Table 1). Through 1959, at least, this was done while the airline stayed broadly break-even. In 1961 AAT significantly increased its scheduled business while reducing military charters. This occurred against a backdrop of a military charter business that had become substantially unprofitable industry-wide in the late 1950s. AAT scheduled service included routes from northern cities like Chicago, Detroit and New York to southern points like Miami and San Juan. Table 1 shows the strategy shift was not financially successful.

In November 1961, Imperial Airlines, another supplemental air carrier, suffered a military charter crash, killing 74 servicemen, focusing official attention on such airlines. AAT had suffered three crashes in the past four years, attracting specific attention. Two of those crashes occurred while engaged in military charters. While no one died, in one case the conduct of the crew caused the CAB to revoke their licenses (see Accidents). In the third crash, the captain overseeing a training flight was AAT president Bell himself, who forgot to lower the landing gear, for which he was fined shortly before the Imperial crash. Shortly after the Imperial crash, AAT was suspended from military work and in March 1962, the Federal Aviation Agency (FAA) suspended the airline's operating license altogether. Bell disbanded the company.

However, a new group (including Hollywood actor Dale Robertson) bought the corporate shell (for $3,400, less than $40,000 in 2026 dollars), got the FAA to restore the operating license and AAT started flying again in August. But coincidentally, new legislation required the CAB to recertificate the economic authority of the supplementals that year. In October the CAB refused to recertificate AAT, noting it was essentially a new company. Further, AAT's business plan relied on once again flying for the military, the prospects for which were uncertain. The CAB shut AAT as of 23 October 1962, one of seven supplementals the CAB terminated in a similar fashion.

== Destinations ==
Scheduled service included:

- Chicago
- Detroit
- Miami
- New York
- San Juan

== Fleet ==
1947:

- 1 Sikorsky VS-44

Year-end 1949:

- 1 Curtiss C-46

Year-end 1952:

- 2 Curtiss C-46

15 December 1953:

- 1 Douglas DC-3
- 1 Curtiss C-46

1 January 1960:

- 4 passenger Curtiss C-46
- 3 cargo Curtiss C-46

Year-end 1960:

- 3 Curtiss C-46
- 2 Douglas DC-4

1961:

- AAT added a Lockheed L-749A Constellation to its fleet in 1961 in a 90-seat configuration.

== Accidents ==
- 7 January 1953 Curtiss C-46F N1648M flying military flight 1-6-6A crashed into mountains near Fish Haven, Idaho on a flight from Seattle to Cheyenne, Wyoming, killing all 37 passengers (soldiers returning home from Korea), along with the crew of three. The Civil Aeronautics Board determined probable cause was inadvertent entry into an area of icing and turbulence, leading to degradation of performance and inability to maintain altitude. The aircraft was supposed to be at 13,000 ft but crashed at 8,500 ft.
- 13 February 1960 Super 46 N46Q flying a military charter from Louisville, Kentucky to McGuire Air Force Base in New Jersey started experiencing heavy icing two hours before arriving at McGuire, but pressed on regardless. The aircraft, which had over six inches of ice on its windshield when it landed (the crew had to bust out the windows to see), stalled on arrival, crashing short of the runway. None of the 53 passengers and 4 crew on board were killed. The CAB revoked the commercial licenses of the pilots based on the reckless behavior of needlessly flying, for hours, into heavy icing.

== See also ==
- List of defunct airlines of the United States
- Charles F. Blair Jr.
- Antilles Air Boats
- United States Overseas Airlines
