= 1946 American Overseas Airlines Douglas DC-4 crash =

Aviation accident in Newfoundland

AOA Douglas C-54 Flagship New England
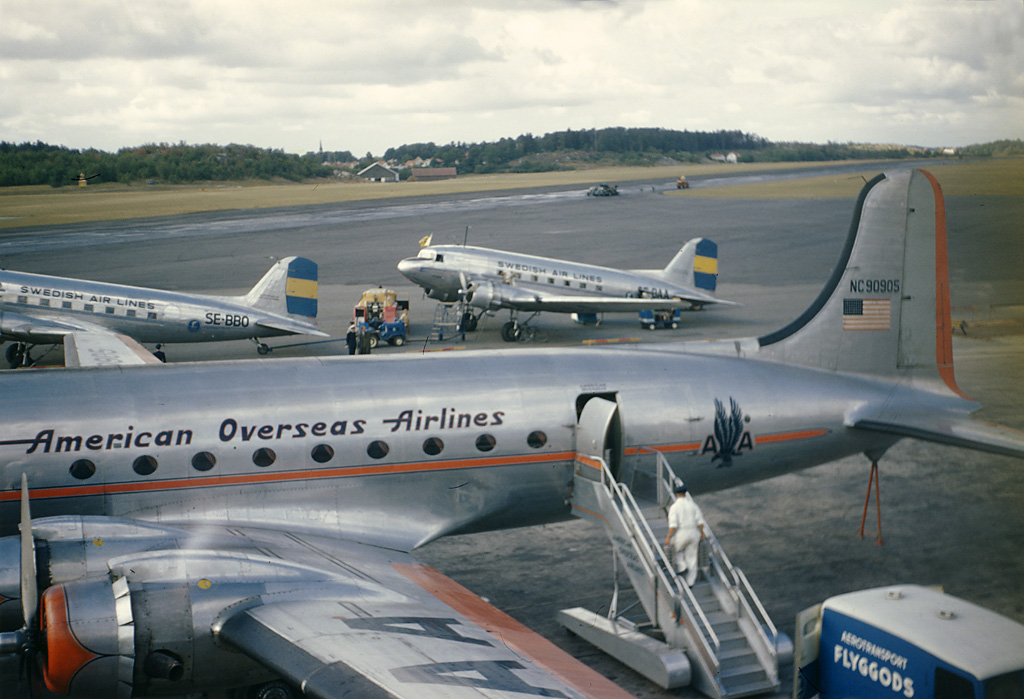
- NC90905, sister-ship to the accident aircraft involved

Accident
- Date: October 3, 1946
- Summary: Controlled flight into terrain (CFIT)
- Site: Near Stephenville, Newfoundland, Canada; 48°35′57.5664″N 58°23′52.3494″W

Aircraft
- Aircraft type: Douglas C-54E-5-DO
- Aircraft name: Flagship New England
- Operator: American Overseas Airlines
- Registration: N90904
- Flight origin: New York Municipal Airport-LaGuardia Field, New York City, United States
- Stopover: (Planned) Gander International Airport, Gander, Newfoundland
- 1st stopover: (Actual) Stephenville-Ernest Harmon AFB, Dominion of Newfoundland
- Last stopover: Shannon Airport, Shannon, County Clare, Ireland
- Destination: Berlin Tegel Airport, Berlin, Germany
- Occupants: 39
- Passengers: 31
- Crew: 8
- Fatalities: 39
- Survivors: 0

On October 3, 1946, an American Overseas Airlines (AOA) Douglas C-54 aircraft named Flagship New England crashed soon after take-off from Stephenville, Newfoundland, killing all 39 people on board. It was, at the time, the deadliest aircraft crash on Newfoundland soil.

== Aircraft and occupants ==
Flagship New England was a Douglas C-54E-5-DO military transport aircraft that had been converted to a Douglas DC-4 civilian airliner; and was registered N90904. It had first flown in 1945 and had logged a total of 3,731 flight hours during its career. On 24 October 1945, it was with Flagship New England that American Overseas Airlines (AOA) launched international flight services. On the accident flight, the aircraft carried thirty-one passengers and a crew of eight. Most of the passengers were wives and children of U.S. servicemen stationed in Allied-occupied Germany.

== Flight and accident ==
At 12:14 PM EST on 2 October, Flagship New England departed New York-LaGuardia Airport for a transatlantic commercial flight to Berlin, with stops in Gander, Newfoundland and Shannon, Ireland. However, poor weather conditions at Gander forced the flight crew to land at Ernest Harmon Air Force Base in Stephenville, Newfoundland instead. In order to let the crew rest, the flight stopped at Stephenville for the next twelve hours.

At 4:45 AM on 3 October, Flagship New England left the gate and was initially cleared to depart from runway 30; however, apparently unfavorable wind conditions prompted Stephenville Air Traffic Control to clear it for runway 07 instead. Overcast skies blocked out light from the moon and stars, rendering the terrain ahead unlit. Flights departing from runway 07 were supposed to make a right-hand turn immediately after take-off so as to avoid hilly terrain in line with the runway. However, the pilots of Flagship New England instead allowed the aircraft to continue going straight ahead after lifting off. At about 5:03 AM, some seven miles from the end of the runway, the aircraft hit a ridge at an elevation of about 1,160 feet and crashed, killing everyone on board.

=== Cause ===
The investigation into the accident indicated the pilots' failure to change course, which led the aircraft across terrain over which sufficient clearance could not be gained, led to the crash.
