= Robert Noel Blair =

American artist (1912–2003)

- Born: August 12, 1912; Buffalo, New York
- Died: June 15, 2003 (aged 90); Holland, New York
- Notable work: paintings of Western New York, Maine, Vermont, the American Southwest and the Battle of the Bulge
- Style: watercolor

Robert Noel Blair (August 12, 1912 – June 15, 2003) was an American painter and sculptor from the Western New York-Buffalo area.

== Art ==
Blair is known for his paintings of Western New York, Maine, Vermont, the American Southwest and the Battle of the Bulge.

Blair, a close contemporary of painter Charles Burchfield, was twice-endowed with a Guggenheim Fellowship, in 1946/1947 and 1951/1952. He was also awarded, amongst other prizes, ten Gold & Silver Medals at the Buffalo Society of Artists Annuals.

=== Notable exhibitions ===
Blair's watercolors have been exhibited widely in both in the United States and Europe and they have earned many prestigious awards. Blair was honored with over fifty one-man shows in his lifetime.

From 1934 to 1946 his work was exhibited at the Albany Institute of History & Art, Albany, New York, and, in 1937, his first one-man exhibition took place at the Bredemeier Gallery, Buffalo, New York. In 1939, his work was exhibited at the Brooklyn Museum, New York, and in 1940, at the Albright Art Gallery (prize), Buffalo, New York, and the Morton Gallery, New York. In 1942, a solo exhibitions were held at both the Albright Art Gallery and the Buffalo Museum of Science, Buffalo, New York. From 1942 to 1945 his work was exhibited at the Art Institute of Chicago, Illinois. In 1947, his art was exhibited at the Corcoran Gallery of Art, Washington, D.C., and in 1948, at the Art Institute of Chicago (Watowsky prize), IL and the Pennsylvania Academy of the Fine Arts, Philadelphia, Pennsylvania. In 1953, his work was exhibited at the Butler Institute of American Art, Youngstown, Ohio, and the Metropolitan Museum of Art Watercolor National (first watercolor prize), New York City. In 1966, his art was exhibited at the Buffalo State University (retrospective), Buffalo, New York, and from September 18 to October 15, 1966, a solo exhibition, "50 Year Retrospective" of paintings and drawings was held at Brian Art Galleries, Amherst, New York.

In 2005, an exhibition of his early work (1931–1949) was shown at the Eclectic Art and Objects Gallery, Pittsburgh, Pennsylvania. The exhibition of watercolors entitled Robert Noel Blair – A View from the Outside was made up of what Blair had considered to be his best and most important paintings which had been stored in his barn studio until his death in 2003.

From August to September, 2011, at the Hoyt Institute of Fine Arts, New Castle, Pennsylvania, fifty-two of Blair's works were shown in a solo exhibition, "Robert N. Blair: Paintings & Drawings", curated by artist, student and friend Wendy Warner.

In May 2012, the Benjaman Gallery held an exhibition of the Blair family's work including art and photographs by Robert Blair, Bruce Blair, David Blair, and Jeanette Blair. A tribute to Jeanette Blair, celebrating her own work as a watercolorist, was held at The Benjaman Gallery on June 1, 2012.

=== Museums and private collections ===
Today, his work is represented in many museums and private collections including the Metropolitan Museum of Art, the Butler Institute of American Art, the Munson-Williams-Proctor Institute of Utica, the Bryn Mawr Art Association, the Dubuque Art Association, Colgate University and the Franklin D. Roosevelt Collection of Marine Paintings. Buffalo State College's Burchfield-Penney Art Center maintains over 175 of Blair's paintings.

The Ford Motor Company owns ten of his paintings. Blair painted a large mural for the Bethlehem Steel Corporation in 1947.

=== Publications ===
Blair's work has been the subject of articles in Art News, Art Digest, Plein Air Magazine, and the New York Times as well as numerous art books.

Blair's art adorns pages in Captain and Mate, 1940; St. Lawrence Seaway, 1957; Ford Times Magazine, 1958–61; American Artist Magazine, 1966; and Jeannie's World, 1966.

== Education and teaching ==
Born in Buffalo, New York, Blair is the brother of aviation pioneer Charles F. Blair, Jr., husband of Hollywood actress Maureen O'Hara. Robert Blair decided to become an artist at age 15. He studied at the School of the Museum of Fine Arts in Boston, 1931–1934 after time with the Albright Art School in Buffalo.

Blair was the director of the Art Institute of Buffalo (1946–1949), where he taught art with his wife, Jeannette Blair. In 1955 he taught at the Albright Art School, Buffalo, New York, and from 1955 to 1971 he taught at the Buffalo State University, Buffalo, New York.

== World War II ==
Although a self-described pacifist, he joined the United States Army on February 14, 1942, at the Fort Niagara Youngstown Branch, 3rd Regiment in Fort McClellan. He was also a member of the 82nd Airborne Division in Berlin as a sergeant and 17th Airborne in Belgium and Germany. In recognition of his persistence (having previously been banned from art supplies) and his talent, a colonel appointed Blair a 'sergeant of secret documents', allowing him to sketch on the battlefield and safely store his work. This would become his plein air series on Battle of the Bulge.

Most of his World War II paintings were donated by Blair to the Burchfield Art Center, Buffalo, New York, (now the Burchfield-Penney Art Center) after a solo exhibition of these works in 1985 at the National Gallery of Art, Washington, D.C., and the Watercolor Society. Images of some of Blair's World War II paintings can be viewed online at the US Army Center of Military History, Battle of the Bulge, Artwork and Photography.

== Personal life ==
Blair married artist Jeanette Ann (née Kenney; born September 22, 1922) on August 8, 1943, in front of his "Sermon on the Mount" mural, one of a trio of murals he contributed to Anniston, AL, while stationed at nearby Fort McClellan, AL. The Blair's had three children: Jeanne Blair (1945-1965), David Blair (1948), and Bruce Blair (1951). Both sons are also artists.

After Blair's World War II army service, in 1946, the couple settled in Holland, New York, and supported themselves selling their own art and teaching art classes. On June 15, 2003, he died at his home in Holland, New York.
