= Air Resorts =

Regional American airline (1975–1990)

Air Resorts Airlines
IATA	ICAO	Call sign
UZ	ARZ	AIR RESORTS
- Founded: 1975; 51 years ago
- Ceased operations: 1990; 36 years ago
- Destinations: 9
- Headquarters: San Diego, California, U.S.
- Key people: Ted Valles (Founder)

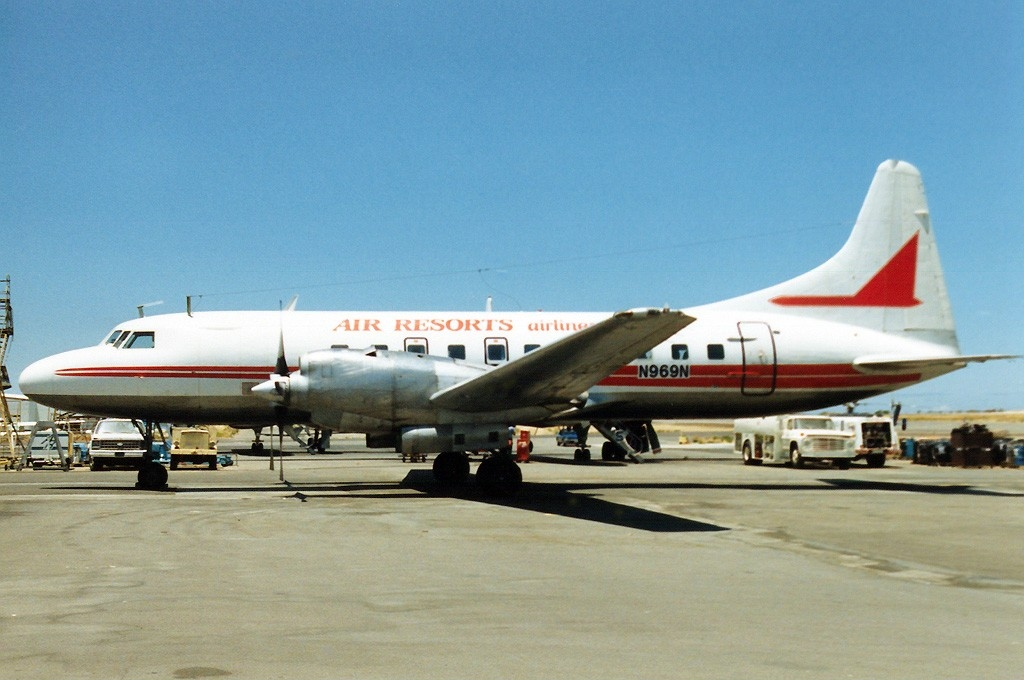
Convair 580 Carlsbad 1991

Air Resorts was a regional airline based in San Diego and Saint Thomas.

== History ==
Air Resorts was founded in 1978 by Ted Vallas as a flight training and air-taxi operator based out of Carlsbad-Palomar Airport in San Diego. By 1978 Air Resorts had acquired two Douglas DC-3s and one Convair 440 to serve San Clemente Island from San Diego on behalf of the US Navy. Seeking an opportunity to enter the scheduled airline market Air Resorts begin routes to San Diego to Burbank, and Los Angeles to both Santa Barbara and Oxnard. In 1982 Air Resorts purchased American Inter-Island Airways from American Airlines and began operations in the Virgin Islands. The airline had amassed a fleet of nine Convair 440s and two Convair 340s to operate their route network.

In December of 1984 a Convair 440 made an emergency landing due to a technical issue. The entire Air Resorts fleet was grounded voluntarily during the investigation and on December 21, 1984 the FAA suspended Air Resorts operating certificate due to alleged safety violations. In 1985 the airline had its operating certificate reinstated and the airline was allowed to operate again.

In the late 1980s the airline cancelled all scheduled services but charter service continued throughout the later 1980s and into the 1990s. In May 1990 the airline restarted scheduled services to between San Diego and Tucson with six flights a day. The airline then received permission to start services to Mexico and began to fly to San Felipe, La Paz and Loreto. In December 1990, Air Resorts was merged with Air LA and suspended passenger services and was absorbed into the new carrier.

== Destinations ==
Air Resorts maintained these scheduled routes throughout its existence:

=== United States ===
- San Diego
- Burbank
- Los Angeles
- Santa Barbara
- Oxnard
- Tucson

=== Mexico ===
- San Felipe
- La Paz
- Loreto

== Fleet ==
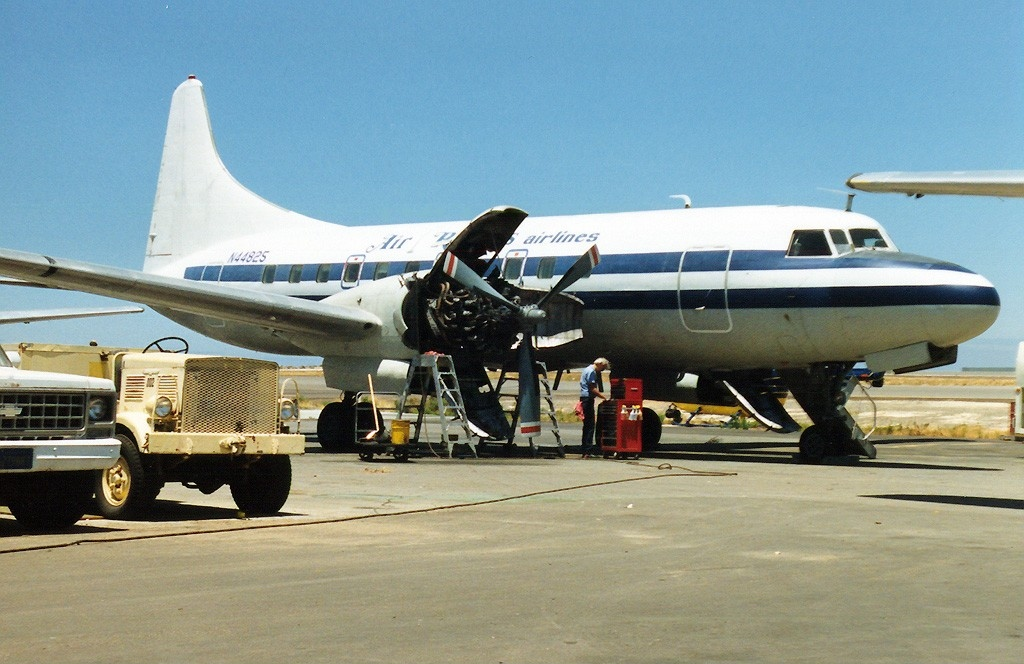
An Air Resorts Convair 440

Air Resorts fleet consisted of:

- Douglas DC-3
- Convair 440
- Convair 340

== See also ==
- List of defunct airlines of the United States
