= Beyond the Curtain =

1960 British film by Compton Bennett

- Directed by: Compton Bennett
- Written by: Compton Bennett; Charles F. Blair; John Cresswell
- Produced by: John Martin
- Starring: Richard Greene; Eva Bartok; Marius Goring; Lucie Mannheim
- Cinematography: Eric Cross
- Music by: Kenneth Pakeman
- Release date: April 1960
- Country: United Kingdom
- Language: English

Beyond the Curtain is a 1960 British drama film written and directed by Compton Bennett, and starring Richard Greene and Eva Bartok. It was written by Compton Bennett, and John Cresswell, based on the 1956 novel Thunder Above by Charles F. Blair and A. J. Wallis.

== Plot ==
A refugee from East Germany finds herself trapped in her home city of Dresden when a plane she is travelling on between Berlin and West Germany is forced down. She is used by the Stasi, who want her to help them to find her dissident brother.

== Cast ==
- Richard Greene as Captain Jim Kyle
- Eva Bartok as Karin von Seefeldt
- Marius Goring as Hans Körtner
- Lucie Mannheim as Frau von Seefeldt
- Andrée Melly as Linda
- George Mikell as Pieter von Seefeldt
- John Welsh as Turner
- Denis Shaw as Krumm
- Annette Carell as governor
- Gaylord Cavallaro as Twining
- Leonard Sachs as waiter
- Brian Wilde as Bill Seddon
- Steve Plytas as Zimmerman
- Guy Kingsley Poynter as Captain Law
- André Mikhelson as Russian Colonel

== Production ==
It was the first British feature film from producer John Martin, who had a strong record in documentaries. It was made in association with the companies of Sydney Box. Filming began in September 1959.

== Reception ==
=== Critical reception ===
Kinematograph Weekly wrote "The picture creates little emotional impact or excitement during the first half, but, although human interest remains flabby, its climax, staged among the rubble and ruins of the Reichschancellery, thrills."

The Monthly Film Bulletin wrote: "This inept melodrama creates little impact or excitement during the first half, and its later attempts at suspense belong to the early days of the serial. Human interest remains flabby throughout, Eva Bartok's strident and hysterical performance being just about what the woefully unconvincing script deserves, and only Eric Cross's photography, and a dash of surface action, rise above the generally tepid level."

Picture Show wrote: "The film's not too bad in places, the backgrounds look authentic enough but the whole thing could have been a lot more exciting if the direction and acting had been more imaginative.
