= Sikorsky VS-44 =

Flying boat family by Sikorsky

VS-44
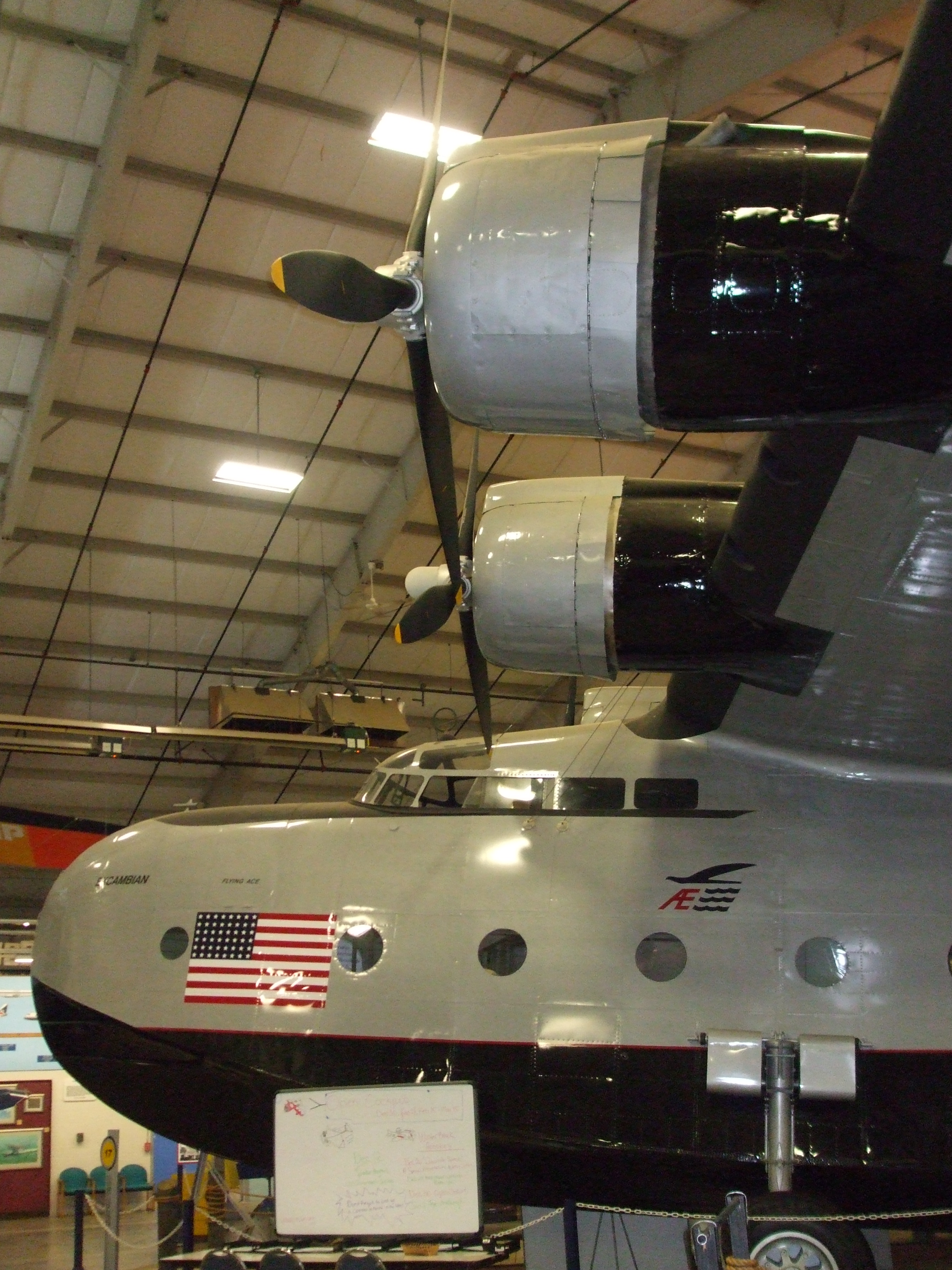
- Excambian

General information
- Type: Flying boat
- National origin: United States
- Manufacturer: Sikorsky Aircraft
- Designer: Igor Sikorsky
- Primary users: American Export Airlines Tampico Airlines; Avalon Air Transport; Antilles Air Boats
- Number built: 4, including 1 XPBS-1 prototype)

History
- Introduction date: 10 February 1942
- First flight: 13 August 1937
- Retired: 1968

The Sikorsky VS-44 is a large four-engined flying boat built in the United States in the early 1940s by Sikorsky Aircraft. Based on the XPBS-1 patrol bomber, the VS-44 was designed primarily for the transatlantic passenger market, with a capacity of 40+ passengers. One XPBS-1 patrol bomber prototype was built, along with three airliners named Excalibur, Excambian, and Exeter.

== Development ==
=== XPBS-1 patrol bomber ===
In March 1935, the United States Navy wanted new patrol bomber with increased performance and weapon load capability from their newly procured Consolidated YP3Y-1. A Prototype was ordered from Sikorsky in June 1935. As the XPBS-1 (Bureau Number 9995), it made its first flight on 9 September 1937, while the competing Consolidated XPB2Y-1 Coronado flew on 17 December of the same year.

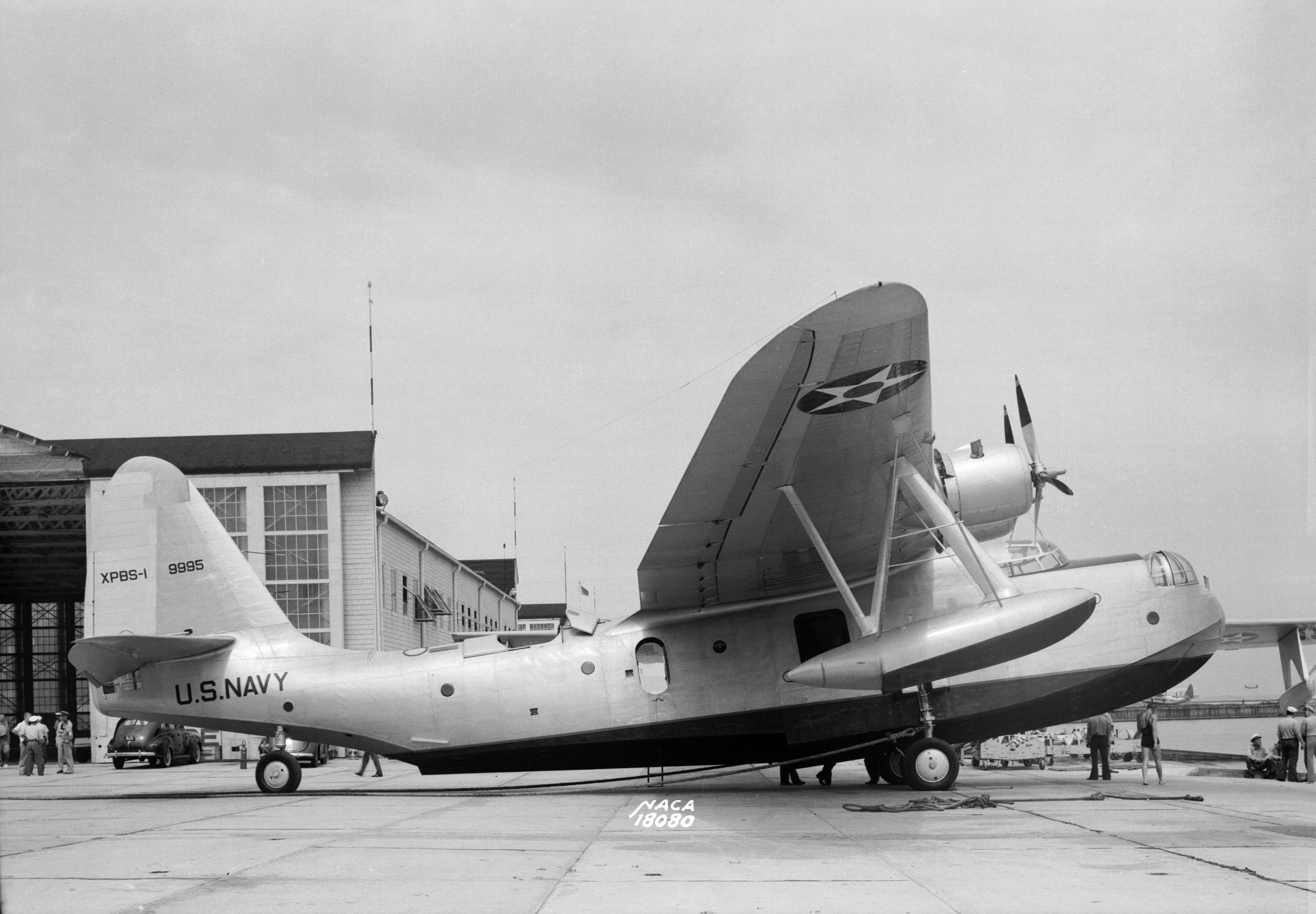
The XPBS-1 patrol bomber, BuNo 9995, circa 1938.

The XPBS-1 was evaluated by the National Advisory Committee for Aeronautics (NACA) in 1938, but the contract went to Consolidated. The XPBS-1 remained in naval service, operated by Patrol Wing Five at Norfolk, Virginia in 1939, then by Patrol Wing Two at Pearl Harbor, Hawaii, until being assigned to transport squadron VR-2 at Naval Air Station Alameda, in 1940. On 30 June 1942, the XPBS-1 hit a submerged log while landing at NAS Alameda. Among its passengers was CINCPAC Admiral Chester W. Nimitz who suffered minor injuries. One crew member died. The XPBS-1 sank and was lost.

=== VS-44 commercial flying boat ===
By 1940 Sikorsky had merged with Chance Vought under the umbrella of United Aircraft and hoped to regain the Pan Am Clipper routes once serviced by their S-42 with the new Vought-Sikorsky VS-44, based on the XPBS-1.

A monoplane seaplane with four twin-row Pratt & Whitney Twin Wasps rated at 1,200 hp (890 kW) each, the new aircraft was 80 ft (24 m) long and weighed 57,500 lb (26,100 kg) for takeoff. The Boeing 314 Clipper was larger and had more powerful engines, but the VS-44 had a longer full-payload range. The VS-44 won several world records after entering service, but lost out on a Pan Am contract, to the Boeing 314 Clipper. The VS-44's limited production would never recoup the development costs.

== Operational service ==
=== Commercial service ===
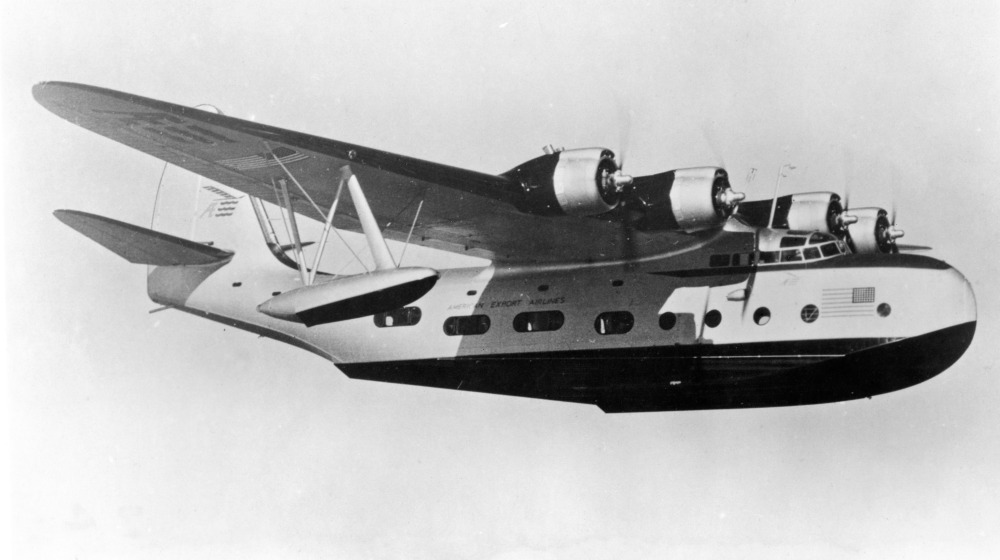
In American Export Airlines service

American Export Airlines (AEA) ordered three VS-44s, dubbed ‘Flying Aces’ and named Excalibur (NX41880 and then NC41880), Excambian (NC41881), and Exeter (NC41882) after the parent company's Four Aces passenger liners. AEA had grown out of the American Export Lines steamship line. The VS-44 offered full-length beds, dressing rooms, a full galley, snack bar, lounge and fully controlled ventilation, comparable to contemporary aircraft.

=== World War II ===
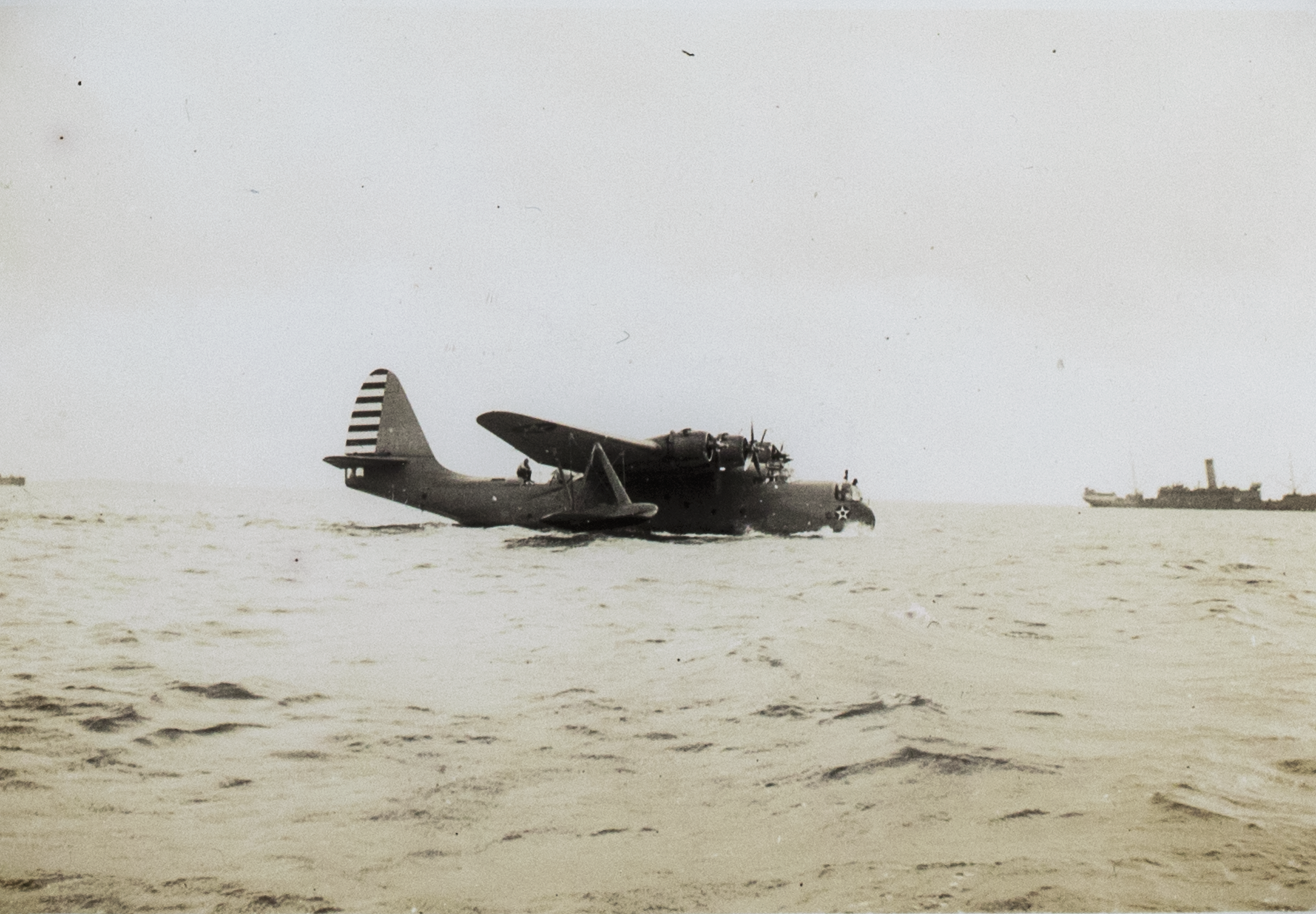
Sikorsky XPBS-1 at Darwin, Northern Territory, prior to the first Japanese attack on 19 February 1942. Visible behind is the Australian steamship S.S. Zealandia sunk during that first raid.

With the US entry into World War II, 200 of the nation's 360 airliners were requisitioned for military service. AEA's three VS-44s, now with the Navy designation JR2S-1, continued flying between New York and Foynes, Ireland, carrying passengers and freight. The first VS-44, Excalibur, crashed on takeoff in 1942 at Botwood, Newfoundland, killing 11 of 37 aboard. A proposed licensed version of the VS-44 to be built by Nash-Kelvinator, the JRK-1, was canceled due to the availability of other aircraft.

=== Postwar service ===
After the war, the two remaining VS-44s continued to fly for AEA, now renamed American Overseas Airlines (AOA) and operated by American Airlines.

In 1946, Exeter was sold to TACI of Montevideo, Uruguay, as CX-AIR. It crashed on August 15, 1947 while landing in the River Plate off Montevideo when (allegedly) returning from a smuggling flight to Paraguayan rebels. Four out of the five crew were killed, but both passengers survived.

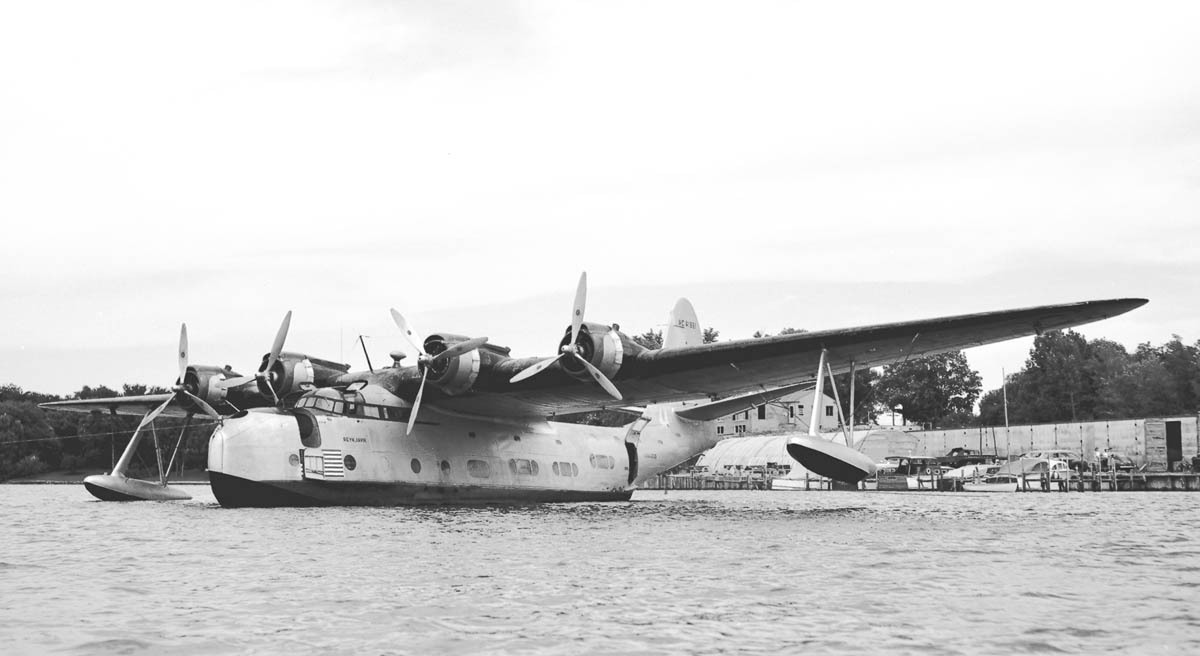
VS-44 "Reykjavik" of Associated Air Transport in 1947, likely at Lake Minnetonka

Excambian was the original aircraft of Associated Air Transport, the first airline founded by Charles F. Blair, who dubbed it Reykjavik, after the intended destination. It was used to fly construction workers from Minnesota to Iceland in 1947. Blair would later operate the same aircraft in his second airline 20 years later, as outlined below.

In 1949, AOA sold Excambian to Tampico Airlines. A short-lived effort to restore the only remaining VS-44 to run freight in the Amazon was unsuccessful, leaving the flying boat stranded in Ancon Harbor, Peru.

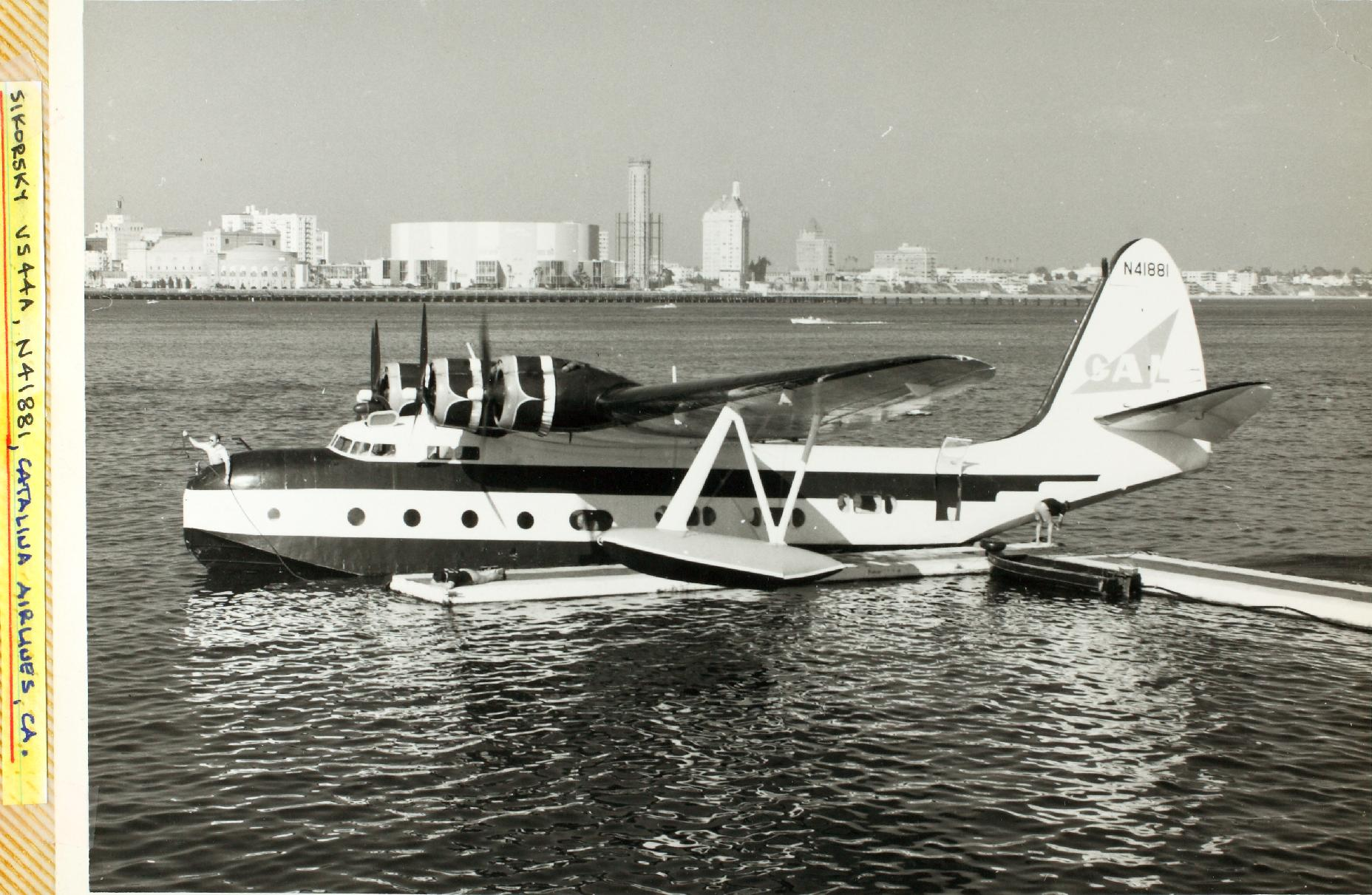
Excambian in Catalina Air Lines service, California

By the late 1950s, two Southern California businessmen had heard of the Excambian's plight and had her ferried to Long Beach, where restoration work began. Dick Probert and Walter von Kleinsmid of Avalon Air Transport, (AAT) thought the VS-44 would be perfect for the Catalina tourist trade. AAT named her Mother Goose, to complement the line's Grumman Goose amphibians, and plans were made for summer trips. In the winter, N41881 would undergo maintenance. Avalon Air Transport became Catalina Air Lines and continued to operate it until the late 1960s.

Excambian carried thousands of passengers for AAT until 1967 when it was sold again to Charles Blair, now of Antilles Air Boats. Blair, husband of actress Maureen O'Hara, acquired Excambian to ferry passengers among the Virgin Islands including service to the Charlotte Amalie Harbor Seaplane Base on St. Thomas and the Christiansted Harbor Seaplane Base on St. Croix. On January 3, 1969 she was extensively damaged by rocks while taxiing at Charlotte Amalie, US Virgin Islands. Damaged beyond economic repair, it was beached in March 1972 and converted into a hot dog stand.

== Restoration and display ==
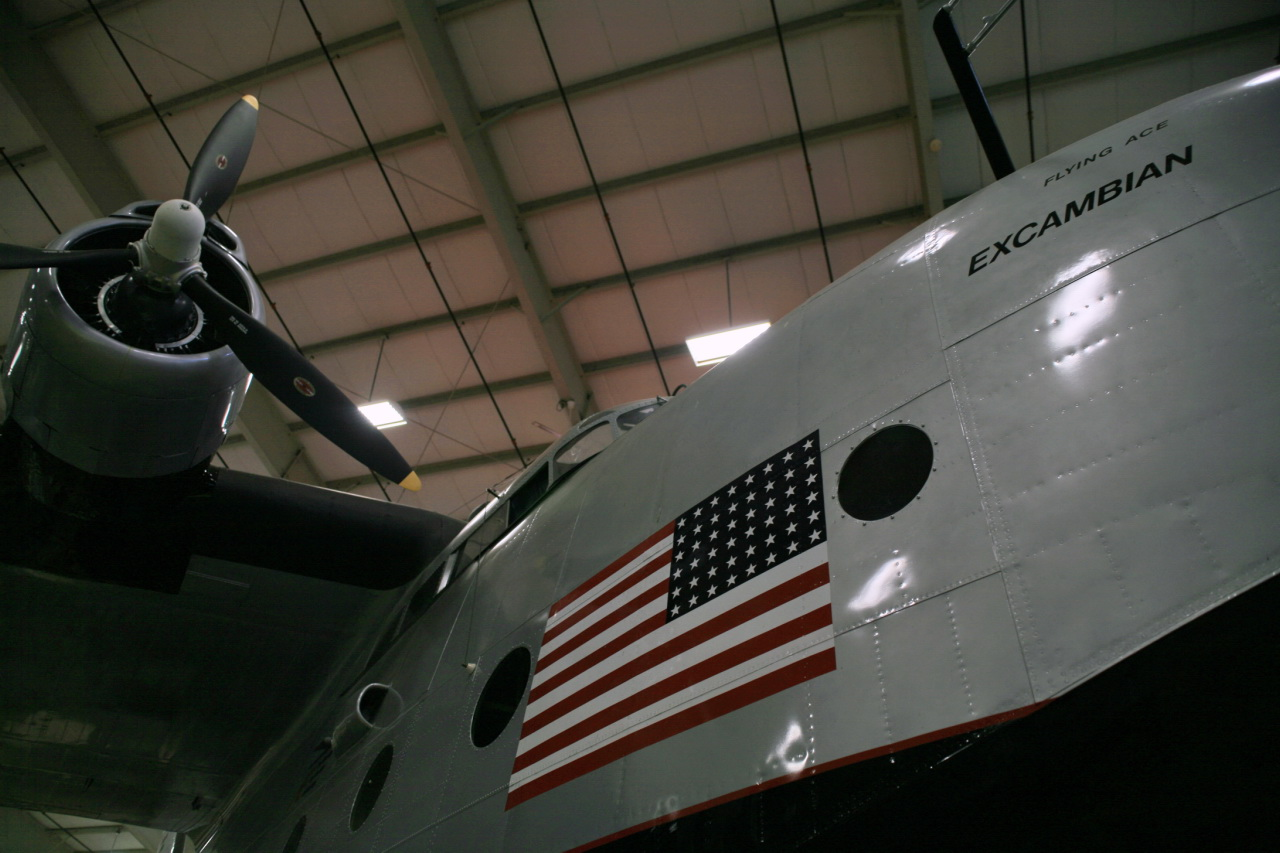
Sikorsky VS-44A Excambian

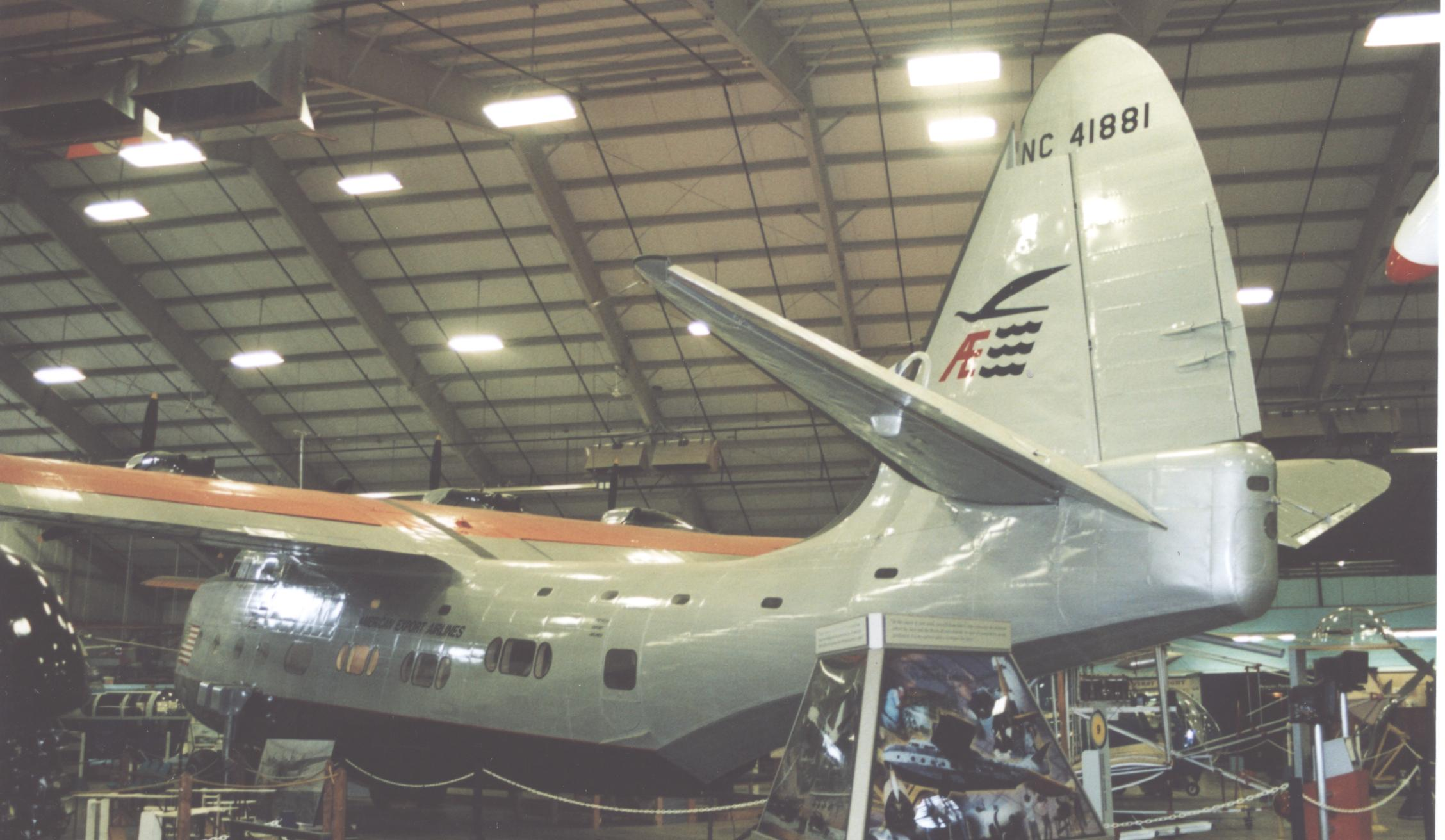
Sikorsky VS-44 NC41881 displayed at the New England Air Museum wearing American Export Airlines colors in June 2005

In 1976, Excambian was donated by Charles Blair, original Chief Pilot of the VS-44, to the National Naval Aviation Museum at NAS Pensacola, Florida. In 1983, the Navy transferred the aircraft on permanent loan to the New England Air Museum in Windsor Locks, Connecticut. The heavily corroded Flying Boat was then shipped by barge from the Gulf of Mexico to Bridgeport, Connecticut. Unloaded by crane, it was trucked a short distance to the Sikorsky Memorial Airport in Stratford, Connecticut. A temporary Nissen hut-style hangar was erected at the airport in front of hangars three and four for the project. This put the VS-44A less than 1000 feet away from the original hangar she was built in, across the street at the (then) Avco Lycoming Engine Plant.

In 1987 the restoration of the Excambian began, and it was decided to restore the rare flying boat to its post-World War II American Export Airlines livery. The restoration was conducted by a team of highly trained volunteers, many of them former Sikorsky workers who had originally built the VS-44As there 50 years ago. The combined support from Sikorsky and Avco Lycoming was crucial for the success of the restoration. On June 18, 1997, after ten years of restoration, the VS-44A was transferred to the New England Air Museum. It was there that the plane was assembled and painted.

In October 1998 a ceremony was held to dedicate the aircraft. The Excambian is the last remaining American-built commercial trans-ocean four-engine flying boat. After the project had been completed, the restoration team located in Stratford began looking at creating its own museum. With the assistance of local senator George "Doc" Gunther, the Connecticut Air & Space Center was founded in 1998. Today the museum is located in building 6, the former Chance Vought R&D Experimental hangar.

== Specifications (VS-44A) ==
Data from Aerofiles : Sikorsky, American flying boats and amphibious aircraft : an illustrated history

General characteristics

- Crew: 4-5
- Capacity: 24 to 47 passengers
- Length: 79 ft 3 in (24.16 m)
- Wingspan: 124 ft 0 in (37.80 m)
- Wing area: 1,670 sq ft (155 m^{2})
- Airfoil: root: NACA 23018; tip: NACA 23009
- Empty weight: 26,407 lb (11,978 kg)
- Gross weight: 48,540 lb (22,017 kg)
- Max takeoff weight: 57,500 lb (26,082 kg)
- Powerplant: 4 × Pratt & Whitney R-1830-S1C3-G 14-cylinder two-row air-cooled radial piston engines, 1,200 hp (890 kW) each
- Propellers: 3-bladed constant-speed propellers

Performance

- Maximum speed: 210 mph (340 km/h, 180 kn)
- Cruise speed: 175 mph (282 km/h, 152 kn)
- Range: 3,598 mi (5,790 km, 3,127 nmi)
- Service ceiling: 18,996 ft (5,790 m)
