= American Overseas Airlines =

US airline

IATA	ICAO	Call sign
-	-	AM OVER
- Founded: 1945; 81 years ago
- Ceased operations: 1950; 76 years ago merged into Pan American World Airways)
- Fleet size: 33 (2 SV-44, 1 DC-3, 2 C-47, 6 C-54, 7 DC-4, 7 L-049, 8 Boeing 377)
- Headquarters: New York City, New York, United States

American Export Airlines
IATA	ICAO	Call sign
-	-	AM EX
- Founded: 1937; 89 years ago
- Ceased operations: 1945; 81 years ago (merged into American Airlines and renamed American Overseas Airlines)
- Fleet size: 14 (1 PBY-4, 3 SV-44, 1 DC-3, 2 Douglas C-47 Skytrain, 7 Douglas C-54 Skymaster)
- Headquarters: New York City, New York, United States

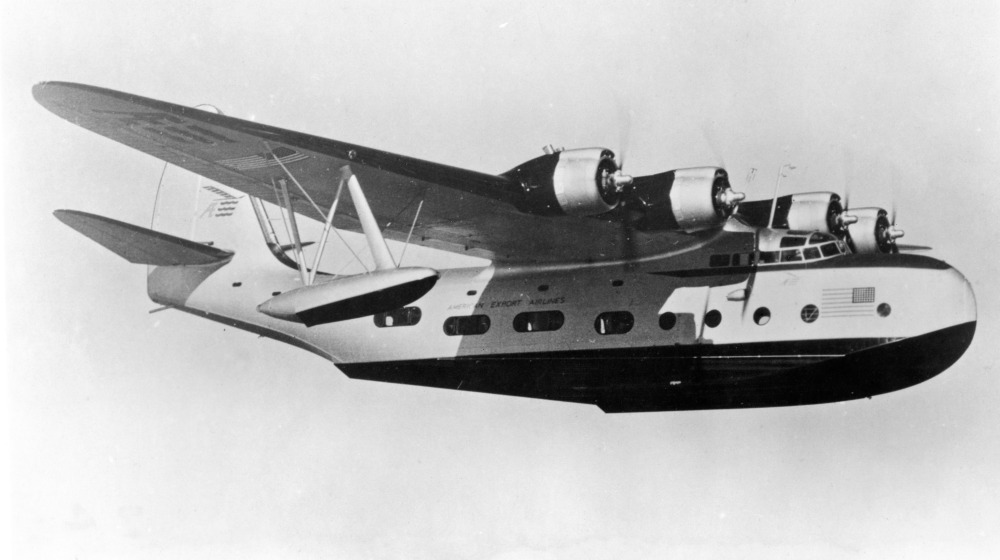
American Export Airlines Sikorsky VS-44

American Overseas Airlines (AOA) was an airline that operated between the United States and Europe between 1945 and 1950. It was headquartered in Midtown Manhattan, New York City.

== History ==
American Export Airlines (AEA), commonly known as Am Ex, was founded in April 1937 as a wholly owned subsidiary of the shipping company American Export Lines. Transatlantic surveys were done with a Consolidated PBY-4 flying boat and in 1939 AEA placed an order for three Vought-Sikorsky VS-44 flying boats, dubbed 'Flying Aces', named after the parent company's Four Aces. That same year, AEA made an application to the U.S. Civil Aeronautics Board (CAB) for routes across the Atlantic from the United States to the United Kingdom, France, and Portugal. On July 15, 1940, in spite of strong protests by Juan Trippe, the president of Pan American Airways (PAA), President Franklin D. Roosevelt gave his approval to AEA for a seven-year temporary certificate to serve Lisbon (Portugal) from New York City-La Guardia Flying Boat base. Later, services were also flown to Foynes (Ireland). These services ended in 1944 when AEA started operations on behalf of the U.S. Air Transport Command (ATC), using Douglas C-54 Skymasters mainly between the US and military bases in North Africa.

AEA could not begin its New York City (USA) – Foynes (Ireland) flying boat service before June 1942, due in part to vigorous objections from PAA.

=== Postwar operations ===
In 1945, AEA was awarded transatlantic rights, which covered destinations in Northern Europe with the requirement that the shipping company (American Export Lines) divest itself of control and turn the control over to another carrier, so that an airline was not controlled by a surface carrier. Consequently, enough stock was sold to American Airlines to give them control, but the chairman of the board of AEA, J. E. Slater, remained. American Airlines was interested in acquiring AEA since it wanted to break into the overseas market, dominated at that time by PAA. The US CAB approved the acquisition of AEA by American Airlines on July 5, 1945. The La Guardia – Botwood – Shannon route was initially operated by Vought-Sikorsky flying boats using the Marine Air Terminal at LaGuardia Airport. By 1948 the airline also served Prestwick, Amsterdam, Frankfurt, Berlin, Keflavik, Oslo, Copenhagen, Stockholm and Helsinki.

The AEA name was retained until November 1945 when AEA was renamed to American Overseas Airlines. The entity started operations with six C-54s at the end of AEA's ATC contract.

AOA launched international landplane flights on October 24, 1945, operating a Douglas DC-4, Flagship New England (N90904), on the route New York City to London via Boston, Gander (Newfoundland) and Shannon (Ireland).

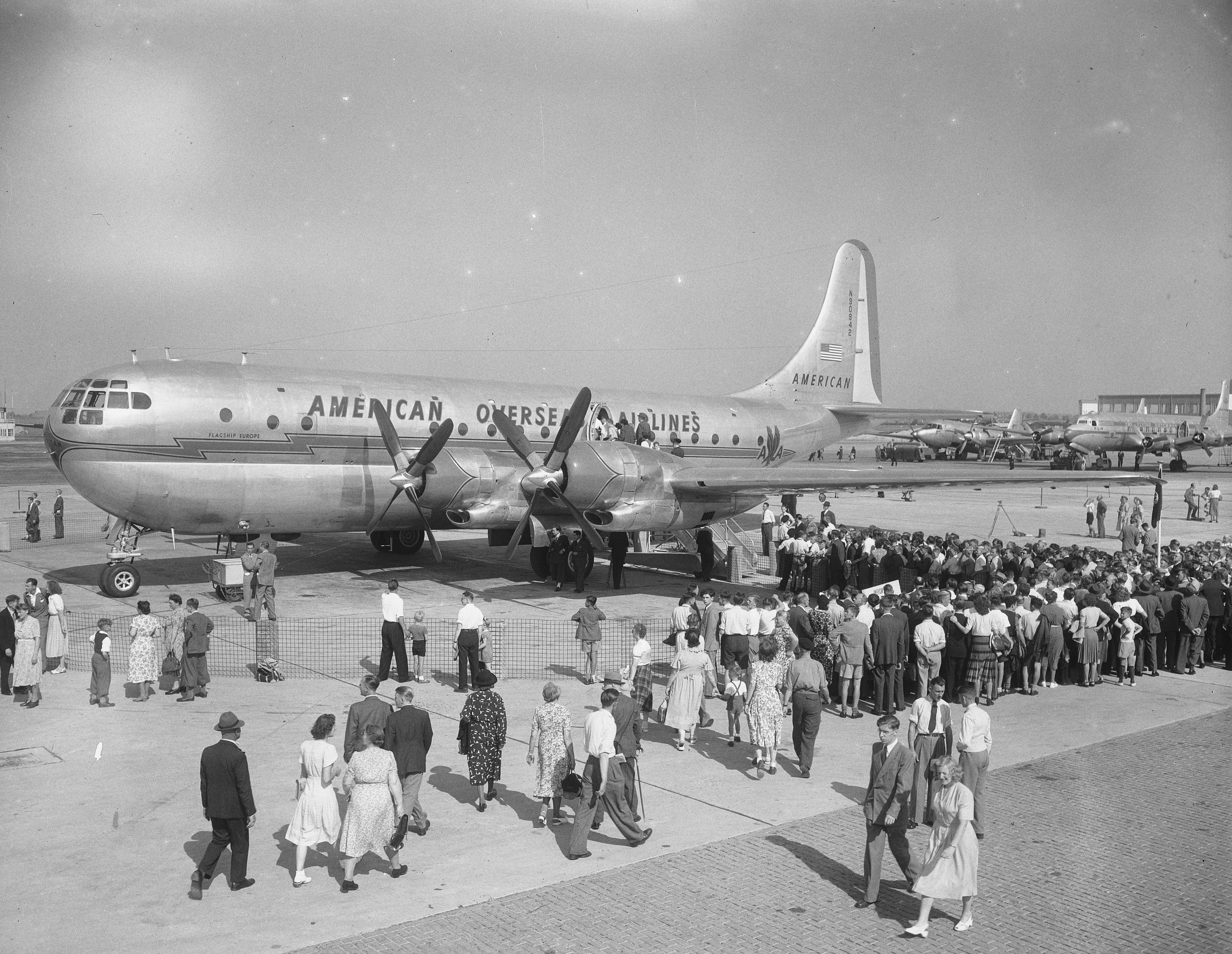
Boeing 377 Stratocruiser

The reliable but unpressurised DC-4s were replaced on the Atlantic routes by Lockheed L-049 Constellations from 23 June 1946. From summer 1949 the Constellations were supplemented and then largely replaced by Boeing 377 Stratocruisers, the first AOA service by the type being on 17 August that year to London Heathrow Airport.

AOA was acquired by PAA but on May 17, 1950, the US CAB ruled against this merger. President Harry S. Truman, however, overturned the CAB decision, and AOA was merged into what would become Pan American's Atlantic Division on September 25, 1950. This unit ultimately became part of Delta Air Lines, following Pan Am's bankruptcy in 1991.

== Destinations ==
According to the August 1, 1950, American Overseas Airlines system timetable, the carrier was serving the following destinations shortly before Pan American was allowed to acquire the airline:

- Amsterdam, Netherlands
- Berlin, Germany
- Boston, Massachusetts
- Copenhagen, Denmark
- Frankfurt, Germany
- Gander, Newfoundland, Canada
- Hamburg, Germany
- Helsinki, Finland
- Keflavik, Iceland
- London, England, United Kingdom
- New York City, New York
- Oslo, Norway
- Philadelphia, Pennsylvania
- Prestwick, Scotland, United Kingdom
- Shannon Airport, Ireland
- Stockholm, Sweden

The above referenced timetable states that the airline was operating Boeing 377 Stratocruiser, Douglas DC-3, Douglas DC-4 and Lockheed L-049 Constellation prop aircraft at this time, all of which AOA referred to as "flagships". The same AOA timetable also contains an American Airlines (AA) connecting service route map with domestic U.S flights as well as flights between the U.S. and Canada and Mexico operated by AA.

== Accidents and incidents ==
On June 18, 1942, an AEA Consolidated 16 Commodore (NC664M) sank into Takla Lake while being flown to Alaska. The flying boat had been contracted by the U.S. Military and was on a fuel stop in Takla Lake when the fuel spilt, causing a fire which sunk the plane. In 2010, plans were made to salvage the wreck and send it to San Diego Air & Space Museum.

On October 3, 1942, AEA's Excalibur (NC41880), a Vought-Sikorsky VS-44, crashed on take-off at Botwood (Newfoundland) when flaps were inadvertently extended to landing position, thus causing the aircraft to stall immediately after lift-off. In the crash, 5 out of crew of 11 and 6 out of 26 passengers perished.

On April 21, 1945, an AEA Douglas C-54 (41-107452) crashed at Kindley Field, Bermuda, after suffering engine failure on a cargo flight. It is unknown if there were any fatalities or injuries.

On October 3, 1946, AOA's Flagship New England (N90904) crashed into a steep ridge en route from Stephenville (Newfoundland) to Shannon (Ireland). This plane crash happened 7.1 miles past the departure runway. There were 8 crew and 31 passenger fatalities; no survivors. The crash investigators attributed the probable cause to "The action of the pilot in maintaining the direction of take-off toward higher terrain over which adequate clearance could not be gained."

On May 3, 1947, AOA's Flagship Denmark was damaged on the runway in Boston when the right wing struck the ground because the right landing gear was retracted while the plane was on the ground.

== Fleet ==
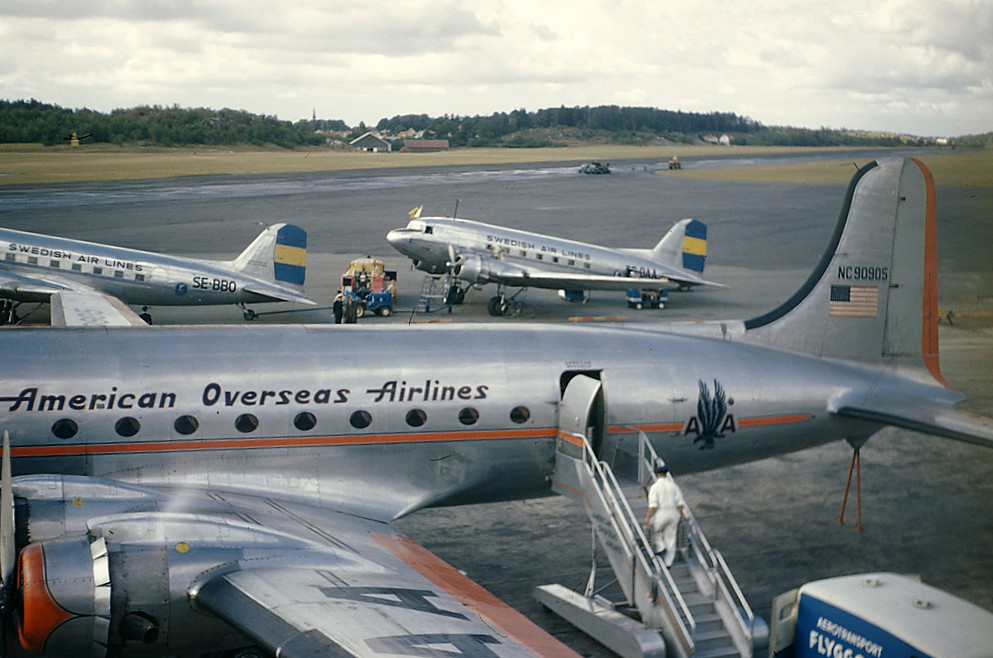
Douglas C-54 N90905 at Bromma Airport in Stockholm 1947.

=== As AEA ===
Consolidated PBY-4 28-4:

- Transatlantic (NC18997) SN/C-4

Douglas C-54 Skymaster:

- (42-107452)

Vought-Sikorsky VS-44:

- Excalibur (NX41880; later as NC41880)

=== As AEA and AOA ===
Vought-Sikorsky VS-44:

- Excambian (no NX; later as NC41881)
- Exeter (no NX; later as NC41882)

Douglas DC-3:

- Helsinki (N25686)

Douglas C-47 Skytrain:

- (N90907)
- Nairobi (N90908)

Douglas C-54 Skymaster:

- Flagship America (N90901); also named Stockholm
- Flagship Frankfurt (N90902)
- Flagship Oslo (N90903)
- Flagship New England (N90904)
- Flagship Glasgow (N90905); also named Berlin
- Flagship Copenhagen (N90906); also named Chicago

=== As AOA ===
Douglas DC-4 Skymaster:

- Flagship Keflavik (N90909)
- Flagship Shannon (N90910)
- Flagship Reykjavik (N90911)
- Flagship Washington (N90912); also named Prestwick
- Flagship Amsterdam (N90913)
- (no flagship name) (N90914)
- Flagship Gander (N90915)

Lockheed L-049 Constellation:

- Flagship Sweden (N90921); also named Stockholm
- Flagship Denmark (N90922); also named Copenhagen and Oslo
- Flagship Great Britain (N90923); also named Scotland and Oslo
- Flagship Holland (N90924); also named Amsterdam and Shannon
- Flagship America (N90925); also named Philadelphia and Copenhagen
- Flagship Éire (N90926); also named Amsterdam and Chicago
- Flagship Norway (N90927); also named Detroit and Glasgow

Boeing 377 Stratocruiser:

- Flagship Scandinavia (N90941); also named Flagship Europe and Flagship Great Britain
- Flagship Europe (N90942); also named Flagship Great Britain
- Flagship Holland (N90943); also named Flagship Europe
- Flagship Ireland (N90944)
- Flagship Norway (N90945)
- Flagship Sweden (N90946)
- Flagship Denmark (N90947)
- Flagship Scotland (N90948)

== See also ==
- List of defunct airlines of the United States
