= 1953 in aviation =

This is a list of aviation-related events from 1953:

== Events ==
- The first year in which the world's airlines carried more than 50 million people.
- Argentina initiates a study of the feasibility of converting either a cargo ship or a heavy cruiser into an aircraft carrier in an Argentine shipyard. Ultimately, no conversion takes place.
- During the Korean War, Communist aircraft attack the U.S. Navy rocket-equipped medium landing ship USS LSM(R)-409 off Korea, but do not damage her.
- Kuwait National Airways, the future Kuwait Airways, is founded. It will begin flight operations in March 1954.
- The Experimental Aircraft Association and annual EAA Convention and Fly-In were founded.
- Thanks to a decreasing interest in seaplanes and flying boats, flying operations cease at the Royal Air Force′s Marine Aircraft Experimental Establishment (MAEE), as does the organization's connection with the RAF. The MAEE will survive until March 1956, evaluating prototype marine craft and air-sea rescue apparati and associated equipment.

=== January ===
- January 1 – The United States Army formally deletes glider operations from its capabilities.
- January 2 – Mackey Air Transport (the future Mackey Airlines) makes its first flight, flying from Fort Lauderdale, Florida, to Palm Beach, Florida, and then on to Nassau in the Bahamas.
- January 5 – The British European Airways Vickers VC.1 Type 610 Viking 1B Lord St. Vincent crashes on approach to Nutts Corner in Northern Ireland, killing 27 of the 35 people on board.
- January 6 – The West German airline Luftag is founded. It will acquire the name and logo of the defunct airline Deutsche Luft Hansa in August 1954, rename itself Lufthansa, and begin flight operations in April 1955.
- January 7
  - A chartered Associated Air Transport Curtiss C-46F-1-CU Commando (registration N1648M) carrying military personnel from Seattle, Washington, to Fort Jackson, South Carolina, with a stop at Cheyenne, Wyoming, experiences atmospheric icing, snow, and turbulence, loses altitude involuntarily, strikes pine trees at an altitude of 8,545 feet (2,605 meters), and crashes west of Fish Haven, Idaho, prior to arriving at Cheyenne, killing all 40 people on board. A Civil Air Patrol pilot discovers the aircraft's wreckage on January 12.
  - Flying Tiger Line Flight 841 – a Douglas C-54B-10-DO Skymaster (registration N86574) on a ferry flight from San Francisco, California, to pick up military personnel in Seattle, Washington – strikes a high tree on a mountain ridge at an altitude of 1,620 feet (490 meters) while on approach to Boeing Field in Seattle and crashes into a canyon 1,500 feet (460 meters) below, killing all seven people on board.
- January 12 – While climbing away after takeoff from RAF Fayid in Egypt, a Royal Air Force Handley Page Hastings C.1 (registration TG602) loses its tail at an altitude of 2,000 feet (610 meters) and crashes west-southwest of RAF Shallufa, killing all nine people on board.
- January 15 – Two Royal Air Force planes, an Avro Lancaster maritime patrol aircraft of No. 38 Squadron and a Vickers Valetta transport aircraft, collide over the Strait of Sicily in heavy rain and poor visibility and crash. The accident kills all 19 people aboard the Valetta and the Lancaster's entire crew of seven.
- January 16 – A United States Air Force Douglas C-54D-5-DC Skymaster crashes in rocky terrain while on final approach to Ernest Harmon Air Force Base in Stephenville, Newfoundland and Labrador, killing 13 of the 14 people on board.
- January 26
  - A Linee Aeree Italiane Douglas C-47-DL Skytrain suffers the failure of its left wing due to overstressing and crashes in mountainous terrain near Sinnai, Sardinia, Italy, killing all 19 people on board.
  - The first meeting of the Experimental Aircraft Association takes place at Milwaukee, Wisconsin's Curtiss-Wright Field.
- January 31 – United States Air Force Captain Ben L. Fithian (pilot) and Lieutenant Sam R. Lyons score the first aerial victory in a Lockheed F-94 Starfire, shooting down a Lavochkin La-9 (NATO reporting name "Fritz") over Korea. It is the first of four kills by F-94s during the Korean War.

=== February ===
- Royal Navy Fleet Air Arm No. 705 Squadron Westland Dragonfly helicopters and other services rescue 600 people over a period of two weeks during severe flooding in the Netherlands. No. 705 Squadron loses one helicopter during the operations.
- No. 194 Squadron is commissioned as the Royal Air Force's first helicopter squadron.
- February 2 – A Skyways Limited Avro York with 39 people on board disappears over the North Atlantic Ocean during a flight from Lajes Field in the Azores to Gander, Newfoundland and Labrador. No trace of the airliner or its occupants ever is found.
- February 7 – A Union Aéromaritime de Transport Douglas C-54A-5-DC Skymaster (registration F-BFGR) crashes into a small wood on approach to Bordeaux–Mérignac Airport in Bordeaux, France, killing nine of the 21 people on board.
- February 9 – An Egyptian Air Force Curtiss C-46D Commando (registration 1001) carrying 35 people crashes in the desert 64 kilometers (40 miles) east of Cairo, Egypt, killing 30 of the people on board and injuring three of the five survivors.
- February 10 – A United States Air Force Fairchild C-119C-18-FA Flying Boxcar (registration 50–0127) crashes in a snowstorm on approach to Bitburg Air Base in West Germany, killing all five people on board.
- February 14 – National Airlines Flight 470, a Douglas DC-6 (registration N90893), crashes in the Gulf of Mexico 20 miles (32 kilometers) off Mobile Point, Alabama, after flying into a strong storm, killing all 46 people on board. Some wreckage and bodies are found the following day, but most of the wreckage will not be found until May 20.
- February 28 – The Soviet Union transfers 10 Tupolev Tu-4 (NATO reporting name "Bull") heavy bombers to the People's Republic of China.

=== March ===
- March 3 – The first fatal crash involving a passenger jetliner takes place when the pilot of the Canadian Pacific Air Lines De Havilland DH.106 Comet 1A Empress of Hawaii (registration CF-CUN) lifts its nose too high during its takeoff run at Karachi Airport in Karachi, Pakistan, for a ferry/positioning flight. The aircraft fails to become airborne and crashes into a dry riverbed, killing all 11 people on board.
- March 10 – Czechoslovak Mikoyan-Gurevich MiG-15s shoot down a United States Air Force F-84 Thunderjet in Czechoslovak airspace.
- March 12 – Soviet fighters shoot down a Royal Air Force Avro Lincoln over East Germany.
- March 14 – After its pilot descends in poor visibility to ascertain his position during a flight from Delhi, India, to Dacca, East Pakistan, an Orient Airways Convair CV-240-7 (registration AP-AEG) crashes into a mountain south of Kalahasahar, India, killing all 16 people on board.
- March 17 – An Aigle Azur Douglas C-47A Skytrain (registration F-BEFG) crashes on approach to Da Nang Airport in Da Nang, French Indochina, and catches fire, killing all eight people on board.
- March 18
  - An East German Junkers Ju 52/3m operated by the Kasernierte Volkspolizei crashes during its initial climb from Cottbus-Drewitz Airport in Drewitz, East Germany, killing all 11 people on board.
  - A United States Air Force Convair RB-36H Peacemaker on a 25-hour training mission strikes an 896-foot (273-meter) hill at an altitude of 800 feet (240 meters) near Burgoyne's Cove, inland from Nut Cove, Trinity Bay, Newfoundland, while flying in sleet, fog, freezing drizzle, and poor visibility at a ground speed of 202 knots (374 km/h; 232 mph). The B-36 crashes and bursts into flames, killing its entire crew of 23. Brigadier General Richard E. Ellsworth, the plane's copilot, is among the dead. A U.S. Air Force Boeing SB-29 Superfortress search and rescue plane sent out to assist in search efforts disappears and is presumed to have crashed as well.
- March 20 – Transocean Air Lines Flight 942, a Douglas C-54G-10-DO Skymaster (registration N88942) carrying military personnel from Walker Air Force Base in Roswell, New Mexico, to Oakland International Airport in Oakland, California, suddenly goes into a steep descent and crashes in a field 12 miles (19 km) southwest of Alvarado, California, killing all 35 people on board.
- March 23 – Czechoslovak airline captain Mira Slovak and a few co-conspirators hijack a Czech Airlines Douglas DC-3 commercial airliner with 24 passengers aboard during a domestic flight from Prague to Brno and flies it to West Germany, where United States Air Force F-84 Thunderjets escort it to a landing at Frankfurt-am-Main. He defects to the West; four of the passengers choose to remain in the West.
- March 27 – The Netherlands establishes the Royal Netherlands Air Force as an independent service.
- March 29 – The Central African Airways Vickers VC.1 Viking Shangani (registration VP-YEY) disintegrates in mid-air near Mkwaya, Tanganyika, after encountering a sudden strong gust of wind during a flight from Chileka Airport in Blantyre, Nyasaland, to Dar es Salaam International Airport in Dar es Salaam, Tanganyika, killing all 13 people aboard. Investigators blame corrosion of the aircraft's starboard boom for the disaster.

=== April ===
- April 1 – British European Airways and Air France introduce "Tourist Class" fares.
- April 3 – BOAC introduces a weekly service to Tokyo (Japan) by the de Havilland Comet 1 jet airliner.
- April 10 – During takeoff from Palisadoes Airport in Kingston, Jamaica, for the inaugural flight of Caribbean International Airways with the airline's owner, Owen Roberts, as its pilot, a Lockheed 18-56-23 Lodestar (registration VP-JBC) suffers the failure of an engine. It climbs to between 100 and 200 feet (30 and 61 meters), then enters a slight banking turn and crashes into the Caribbean Sea, killing 13 of the 14 people on board. Roberts is among the dead.
- April 14 – While on approach to Boeing Field in Seattle, Washington, a Miami Airlines Douglas DC-3C (registration N65743) strikes 150-to-200-foot- (46-to-61-meter-) tall trees at the 3,500-foot (1,100-meter) level of Cedar Mountain and crashes east of Selleck, Washington, killing seven of the 25 people on board.
- April 16 – An Aigle Azur Douglas C-47A-75-DL Skytrain (registration F-BESS) operating on a military charter flight to Nà Sản Airport in Sơn La, French Indochina, loses a wing shortly after takeoff from Gia Lam Airport in Hanoi, French Indochina, and crashes, killing all 30 people on board.
- April 17 – The United States Air Force establishes the Seventeenth Air Force, activating it for service in North Africa, Portugal, the Mediterranean, Austria, the Middle East, Pakistan, India, and Ceylon.
- April 20 – Western Air Lines Flight 636, a Douglas DC-6B (registration N91303) flying at night on the last leg of a flight from Los Angeles to San Francisco to Oakland, California, descends below the prescribed minimum altitude of 500 feet (150 meters) and crashes into San Francisco Bay, killing eight of the ten people on board.
- April 24 - Tragedy strikes the United States Air Force's Project Tip Tow – which tests the feasibility of strategic bombers carrying fighter aircraft attached to their wingtips to defend them against enemy interceptors – when an EF-84D Thunderjet flips over onto the wing of an ETB-29A Superfortress after attaching to its wingtip, causing the EF-84D, the ETB-29A, and another EF-84D attached to the ETB-29A's other wingtip to crash, killing everyone aboard all three aircraft.

=== May ===
- May 1 – Chicago and Southern Airlines merges into Delta Air Lines.
- May 2 – While climbing to its cruising altitude shortly after takeoff from Dum Dum Airport in Calcutta, India, for a flight to Safdarjung Airport in New Delhi, India, BOAC Flight 783 – a de Havilland DH.106 Comet 1 (registration G-ALYV) – suffers a severe structural failure and in-flight fire after entering a thunderstorm and crashes 32 kilometers (20 miles) northwest of Dum Dum Airport, killing all 43 people on board.
- May 7 – A Royal Air Force Vickers Valetta T.3 on routine navigation training flight crashes at sea 40 kilometers (25 miles) off the United Kingdom's Hartland Point, killing all 10 people on board.
- May 9 – An Air India Douglas C-47A-25-DK Skytrain (registration VT-AUD) overbanks during a steep right turn five minutes after takeoff from Palam Airport in New Delhi, India, and crashes, killing all 18 people on board.
- May 11 – INS Garuda opens, serving as the base for the Indian Naval Air Arm.
- May 12 – The second Bell X-2 research aircraft explodes over Lake Ontario while mated to its Boeing EB-50 Superfortress mothership, killing test pilot Jean "Skip" Ziegler and an EB-50 crewman and critically damaging the EB-50, which manages to land safely.
- May 13 – 59 U.S. Air Force F-84G Thunderjet fighter-bombers attack the Toksan dike in Korea.
- May 16 – 90 U.S. Air Force F-84 Thunderjets carry out a successful attack against Chusan, Korea.
- May 17 – After entering a thunderstorm while on approach to Greater Shreveport Municipal Airport in Shreveport, Louisiana, Delta Air Lines Flight 318 – a Douglas DC-3DST-318 (registration N28345) – is forced down to a very low altitude, where it strikes trees and crashes east of Marshall, Texas, killing 19 of the 20 people on board.
- May 18
  - On his last day of combat, U.S. Air Force Captain Joseph C. McConnell shoots down three MiG-15s (NATO reporting name "Fagot") during two sorties over Korea in the F-86F-1 Sabre Beauteous Butch II. He has shot down 16 aircraft, all MiG-15s, in his four months of combat, making him the top-scoring American fighter pilot of the Korean War and the first American triple jet ace. He remains the top-scoring American jet ace in history.
  - American Jacqueline Cochran becomes the first woman to break the sound barrier, reaching over 760 mph (1,220 km/h) in a series of steep dives in an F-86 Sabre over Edwards Air Force Base, California. She also sets a new women's international speed-over-distance record over a 100 km (62 mi) closed course, averaging 652 mph (1,049 km/h).
- May 19 – The U.S. Joint Chiefs of Staff recommend that United Nations air and naval operations expand into Manchuria and other parts of the People's Republic of China and include the use of nuclear weapons, if necessary, in order to force an end to the Korean War. The U.S. National Security Council approves the recommendation the following day.
- May 20 – Flying a North American F-86 Sabre, Jacqueline "Jackie" Cochran sets a women's world speed record.
- May 22 – A Resort Airlines Curtiss C-46F crashes near Des Moines, Iowa on a ferry flight from Cheyenne, Wyoming to Chicago after an aileron component detaches in a thunderstorm, killing both pilots.

=== June ===
- The U.S. Joint Intelligence Committee estimates that the Soviet Union could employ 12,000 tactical aircraft in support of Soviet Army ground forces if the Soviets began an offensive against the North Atlantic Treaty Organization (NATO) in Europe.
- Mackey Air Transport changes its name to Mackey Airlines.
- June 1 – The U.S. Air Force Thunderbirds are activated as the 3600th Air Demonstration Team at Luke Air Force Base, Arizona.
- June 2 – To ensure television viewers in Canada can see the Coronation of Queen Elizabeth II in London on the same day that it takes place, British Royal Air Force English Electric Canberras fly film of the ceremony across the Atlantic Ocean to be broadcast by the Canadian Broadcasting Corporation, the first non-stop flight between the United Kingdom and the Canadian mainland. At Goose Bay in Labrador the film is transferred to a Royal Canadian Air Force Avro Canada CF-100 Canuck jet fighter for the further trip to Montreal. In all, three such voyages are made as the ceremonies proceed.
- June 7 – Descending from 41,000 feet (12,000 m) over the Yalu River to attack what he thinks is a flight of four MiG-15s (NATO reporting name "Fagot"), U.S. Air Force pilot Ralph S. Parr, flying an F-86 Sabre, pursues them to 300 feet (91 m), then climbs to 4,000 feet (1,200 m) before realizing he is actually engaged with 16 MiG-15s. In the ensuing dogfight, he shoots down two and damages a third before withdrawing safely.
- June 11 – The second prototype of the Gloster Javelin crashes. Gloster test pilot Peter Godfrey Lawrence ejects at an altitude of about 400 feet (120 m) but is killed.
- June 14 – Lightning strikes Aeroflot Flight 229 – an Ilyushin Il-12 (registration CCCP-L1375) on a domestic flight in the Soviet Union – after it enters a sudden and severe thunderstorm. The aircraft enters an uncontrolled dive and loses its outer wing panels when the crew attempts to recover at an altitude of 300 meters (980 feet). The aircraft crashes nose first into a wooded hillside northeast of Zugdidi in the Georgian Soviet Socialist Republic and catches fire, killing all 18 people on board. The Georgian film actress Nato Vachnadze is among the dead.
- June 15
  - The British Royal Navy aircraft carriers HMS Eagle, HMS Illustrious, HMS Implacable, HMS Indefatigable, HMS Indomitable, HMS Perseus, and HMS Theseus, the Royal Canadian Navy aircraft carrier HMCS Magnificent, and the Royal Australian Navy aircraft carrier HMAS Sydney and 37 squadrons of Fleet Air Arm and Royal Naval Volunteer Reserve aircraft – including Fireflies, Sea Furies, Seafires, Attackers, Vampires, Skyraiders, Sea Hornets, Meteors, Avengers, Gannets, Wyverns, Sea Venoms, Sea Hawks, and Dragonflies – take part in the Coronation Review of the Fleet for Queen Elizabeth II. The ceremonies include a fly-past by 300 naval aircraft.
  - A LACSA Douglas C-47B-5-DK Skytrain (registration TI-1002) crashes into a mountainside in Costa Rica's San Ramon Mountains, killing nine of the 15 people on board.
  - A LAN Chile Lockheed 18-56-23 Lodestar (registration CC-CLD-0100) crashes near Chamonate Airport outside Copiapó, Chile, after an engine fire, killing all seven people on board.
- June 16
  - A United States Marine Corps AD-4 Skyraider scores the only documented air-to-air kill of the Korean War by a Skyraider, shooting down a Polikarpov Po-2 (NATO reporting name "Mule") biplane.
  - An Aigle Azur Douglas C-47A-65-DL Skytrain (registration F-BEST) on a domestic flight in French Indochina from Wattay Airport in Vientiane to Tân Sơn Nhất Airfield near Saigon catches fire in mid-air and crashes on Phou-Lassi Hill in what would later become Laos, killing all 34 people on board. The aircraft's wreckage is discovered on June 29.
- June 17 – A Panair do Brasil Lockheed L-049 Constellation (registration PP-PDA) crashes in a narrow valley on final approach to São Paulo–Congonhas Airport in São Paulo, Brazil, killing all 17 people on board.
- June 18
  - A United States Air Force Douglas C-124 Globemaster II crashes just after takeoff from Tachikawa Airfield near Tokyo, Japan, killing all 129 people on board. It is the deadliest air crash in history at the time and the first with a confirmed death toll exceeding 100. The toll surpasses a 1952 crash in Moses Lake, Washington, in the United States, also involving a U.S. Air Force Globemaster II.
  - René Fonck, the top-scoring Allied and second-highest-scoring ace overall of World War I with 75 kills, dies in Paris, France at the age of 59.
- June 23 – Lieutenant Commander George H. Whisler Jr., of U.S. Navy Air Transport Squadron 31 (VR-31), a ferry squadron, makes the first round-trip across the continental United States to be completed between sunrise and sunset. Departing Naval Air Station Norfolk, Virginia, in a Grumman F9F-6 Cougar at 05:18 local time, he makes stops at Naval Air Station Memphis, Tennessee, and Webb Air Force Base, Texas, before arriving at Naval Air Station North Island, California at 09:05 local time. At 09:55 local time, he takes off from North Island in a Douglas F3D-2 Skyknight, stops at Naval Air Station Dallas, Texas, to refuel, and lands at Naval Air Station Norfolk at 19:21 local time.
- June 26 – German-born American watchmaker Peter Gluckmann lands at Renfrew Airport outside Glasgow, Scotland, for a stopover during a solo flight he is making from San Mateo, California, to West Berlin. Departing San Mateo on June 6, he has made stops in the United States at Needles, California; Oklahoma City, Oklahoma; Decatur, Illinois; South Bend, Indiana; and Grand Rapids, Michigan; in Canada at London and Trenton, Ontario, Montreal and Mont Joli, Quebec, and Goose Bay, Newfoundland and Labrador; in Greenland at Bluie West One, where he waits for nine days for bad weather to clear; and at Reykjavík, Iceland, before arriving at Renfrew Airport. His plane — a Luscombe 8F with a 35-foot (10.7 m) wingspan and 90 hp (67 kW) engine — is the smallest and least powerful plane ever to make a transatlantic flight. He continues to London the next day, and in late June or early July flies on to West Berlin, the first civilian to fly in the West Berlin Air Corridors and the first private pilot to land at Berlin Tempelhof Airport since World War II. The press dubs him "The Flying Watchmaker."
- June 30
  - Attacked by ten MiGs, U.S. Air Force pilot Ralph S. Parr, flying an F-86 Sabre, shoots down two of them and drives the rest off despite being low on fuel, escorting the badly damaged F-86 of his wing commander to a safe landing at an air base near Seoul. He will receive the Distinguished Service Cross for the mission.
  - A SNCASO S.O. 4000 (prototype of the Sud Vautour fighter-bomber) becomes the first European aircraft to exceed the speed of sound in a shallow dive.

=== July ===
- Chilean President Carlos Ibáñez del Campo grants the Chilean Navy the authority to operate helicopters and transport aircraft. It is the first time that the navy has had administrative control over aircraft since 1930.
- The Moroccan airlines Compagnie Chérifienne de'l Air (Air Atlas) and Compagnie Chérifienne de Transports Aériens Air Maroc merge to form Royal Air Maroc—Compagnie Nationale de Transports Aériens, with a fleet of six Sud-Ouest Bretagnes, four Curtiss C-46 Commandos, five Douglas DC-3s, and two SNCASE Languedocs. The new airline will be renamed Royal Air Maroc in June 1957.
- July 1
  - The responsibility for air traffic control over West Germany is transferred from the Allies to West German authorities.
  - The Aero Vodochody company is formed in Czechoslovakia, carrying on the "Aero" name of Aero Tovarna.
- July 3 – The first tethered flight by the Rolls-Royce Thrust Measuring Rig VTOL aircraft takes place.
- July 8 – Sabena begins the first international helicopter services, linking Brussels (Belgium) with destinations in the Netherlands and France.
- July 10 – A Royal Norwegian Air Force F-84 Thunderjet and a United States Air Force C-47D Skytrain collide in mid-air near Stavanger Airport, Sola, in Stavanger, Norway, while the C-47D is on final approach to the airport. Both aircraft crash, killing the F-84 pilot and all 10 people aboard the C-47D.
- July 12 – During a charter flight from Wake Island Airfield on Wake Island to Honolulu International Airport in Honolulu, Territory of Hawaii, Transocean Air Lines Flight 512, the Douglas DC-6 The Royal Hawaiian (registration N90806), crashes at high speed into the Pacific Ocean 344 miles (554 km) east of Wake Island, killing all 58 people on board.
- Mid-July – At the request of Rear Admiral Joseph J. "Jocko" Clark, the commander of the U.S. Navy's aircraft carrier task force, Task Force 77, off Korea, atomic bombs are placed aboard Task Force 77 carriers as a "precautionary measure," in case they are needed if the Korean War expands into Manchuria.
- July 17
  - Lieutenant Guy P. Bordelon scores his fifth aerial victory, becoming the United States Navy's only ace of the Korean War. He had scored all five victories since June 29, using an F4U-5N Corsair night fighter to shoot down North Korean Polikarpov Po-2 (NATO reporting name "Mule") biplanes making night harassment raids.
  - A U.S. Navy Fairchild R4Q-2 Packet carrying Reserve Officers' Training Corps (ROTC) students from summer training in Corpus Christi, Texas, to Norfolk, Virginia, crashes into a wooded area during its initial climb after taking off following a refueling stop at Naval Air Station Whiting Field, Florida, killing 44 of the 46 people on board.
- July 23 – A U.S. Navy fleet-record 61,000th landing takes place aboard the aircraft carrier USS Boxer (CVA-21) off Korea.
- July 24–26 – Operating off the east coast of Korea, the U.S. Navy attack aircraft carriers USS Boxer, USS Lake Champlain (CVA-39), USS Philippine Sea (CVA-47), and USS Princeton (CVA-37), supporting United Nations ground forces, break records for the number of sorties flown with the highest sortie rates of the Korean War. They average 170 sorties per day, and Princeton aircraft fly 184 sorties on one day.
- July 26 – German-born American watchmaker Peter Gluckmann lands at San Francisco, California, completing a round-trip flight from California to West Berlin in a Luscombe 8F with a 35-foot (10.7 m) wingspan and 90 hp (67 kW) engine. During his return flight, he has made stops in West Germany at Frankfurt-am-Main; in the United Kingdom at London and Prestwick, Scotland; at Reykjavík, Iceland; in Greenland at Bluie West One; in Canada at Goose Bay, Newfoundland and Labrador, at Sept-Îles and Montreal, Quebec, and at Trenton, Ontario; and in the United States at Rochester, New York; Willoughby, Ohio; South Bend, Indiana; Decatur, Illinois; Cheyenne, Wyoming; Ogden, Utah; and Reno, Nevada. During his 50-day, approximately 14,000-mile (23,000 km) round trip, he has spent 188 hours in the air, crossed the Atlantic Ocean twice in the smallest and least powerful aircraft ever to make a transatlantic flight, and become the first civilian to fly in the West Berlin Air Corridors, the first private pilot to land at Berlin Tempelhof Airport since World War II, and the first pilot to make a round-trip crossing of the Atlantic in a light plane. The press dubs him "The Flying Watchmaker."
- July 27
  - Aircraft from the aircraft carriers of U.S. Navy Task Force 77 attack airfields in North Korea. Since July 1, U.S. Navy carrier aircraft have flown 6,423 sorties over Korea, and aircraft ordnance tonnage has doubled since May 1.
  - Hours before the armistice that ends the Korean War, U.S. Air Force pilot Ralph S. Parr, flying an F-86F Sabre, scores the final aerial victory of the war, shooting down in flames a Soviet Ilyushin Il-12 (NATO reporting name "Coach") cargo aircraft in restricted airspace over North Korea with one long burst of gunfire, killing all 21 people aboard the Il-12. It is his 10th victory, all of them scored during 30 missions flown in the last seven weeks of the war, tying him with five other pilots for total kills during the conflict. The Soviet Union claims the Il-12, which crashes 4 kilometers (2.5 miles) from Mao-erh-shan in the People's Republic of China, was a civilian aircraft carrying VIPs, but Parr claims it was marked with a military red star.
  - The Korean War ends. During the war, the United States has dropped 635,000 short tons (576.062 metric tons) of bombs – compared with 503,000 short tons (456,314 metric tons) throughout the entire Pacific Theater of Operations during World War II – as well as 32,557 short tons (29,535 metric tons) of napalm. The U.S. Navy has flown 276,000 combat sorties – only 7,000 fewer than it had in all of World War II – and dropped 177,000 short tons (160,573 metric tons) of bombs – 77,000 short tons (67,132 metric tons) more than it did during all of World War II. It has lost 1,248 aircraft, 564 of them (including 302 F4U Corsairs and 124 AD Skyraiders) to enemy action. Since mid-1951, the U.S. Navy and U.S. Marine Corps combined have lost 384 tactical aircraft to enemy ground fire, including 193 Corsairs and 102 Skyraiders. A typical U.S. Navy carrier air wing has lost 10 percent of its aircrew during its deployment to Korea. Aircraft of the British Royal Navy's Fleet Air Arm have flown over 20,000 carrier sorties during the war.
  - The Korean War ends with U.S. Air Force B-29 Superfortress gunners having shot down 27 enemy aircraft during the conflict. No bomber gunner will shoot down an enemy plane again until December 1972.
- July 28
  - Two B-47 Stratojet bombers of the U.S. Air Force's 305th Bombardment Wing set speed records, when one flies from RCAF Goose Bay, Labrador, to RAF Fairford, England, in 4 hours 14 minutes and the other flies from Limestone Air Force Base, Maine, to RAF Fairford in 4 hours 45 minutes.
  - Piloted by test pilot Bill Bridgeman, the Douglas X-3 Stiletto reaches the highest speed it ever achieves, attaining Mach 1.21 in a 30-degree dive from an altitude of 36,000 feet (11,000 meters).

=== August ===
- A Royal Air Force English Electric Canberra on an intelligence-gathering flight overflies the secret Kapustin Yar rocket test site in the Soviet Union.
- Using money-saving quick-turnaround aircraft ground handling techniques — including having its own pilots refuel its planes instead of paying airport personnel to do it, keeping one engine running while a purser quickly escorts passengers to and from the plane, and using an airstair (a door that doubles as a staircase for passengers) to avoid waiting for a ground crew to roll a wheeled staircase up to the plane — that cut ground time for its airliners to the point that its planes can discharge passengers, board passengers, and begin to taxi for takeoff only 90 seconds (7 1/2 minutes if refueling is necessary) after coming to a stop, Southwest Airways schedules a Douglas DC-3 to fly from San Francisco International Airport to Los Angeles International Airport in 3 hours and 45 minutes with eight stops.
- August 1 – Indian Airlines begins operations.
- August 20 – Using aerial refueling, 17 U.S. Air Force F-84G Thunderjets make the longest-ever nonstop flight by jet fighters, flying 4,485 miles (7,218 km) from the United States to the United Kingdom.

=== September ===
- September 1
  - After beginning its descent to Nice Airport in Nice, France, Air France Flight 178 – a Lockheed L-749A Constellation (registration F-BAZZ) – strays off course and crashes into the side of Mount Cimet in the Maritime Alps 80 kilometers (50 miles) northeast of Nice. All 42 people on board die, including French violinist Jacques Thibaud.
  - The United States Air Force conducts the world's first jet-to-jet aerial refueling when a KB-47 Stratojet tanker refuels a B-47 Stratojet bomber.
  - A Regina Cargo Airlines Douglas C-47K Skytrain (registration N19941) carrying military personnel on a charter flight from Fort Ord in Monterey, California, to McChord Air Force Base in Tacoma, Washington, crashes southeast of Vail, Washington, killing all 21 people on board.
- September 15 – West Germany establishes its Vorläufige Bundesstelle für Luftfahrtgerät und Flugunfalluntersuchung (Provisional Federal Office for Avionic Devices and Investigation of Aviation Accidents).
- September 16 – American Airlines Flight 723, a Convair CV-240-0, crashes in Colonie, New York, while on final approach in fog to land at Albany Airport, killing all 28 people on board.
- September 17 – Test pilot Scott Crossfield reaches Mach 1.85 at an altitude of 74,000 feet (23,000 m) in a Douglas Skyrocket.
- September 21 – North Korean pilot No Kum-Sok defects to South Korea, bringing his MiG-15 with him to Seoul and collecting a $US 100,000 reward.
- September 28 – Resort Airlines Flight 1081 – a Curtiss C-46F-1-CU Commando (registration N66534) – crashes on approach to Standiford Field in Louisville, Kentucky, and bursts into flames, killing 25 of the 41 people on board.

=== October ===
- October – Chapter One of the Milwaukee, Wisconsin-based Experimental Aircraft Association is formed in Riverside, California.
- October 3 – Flying a Douglas XF4D-1, U.S. Navy Lieutenant Commander James F. Verdin sets a world airspeed record over a 3 km (1.9 mi) course of 752.944 mph (1,211.746 km/h). It is the first time that a carrier-capable combat aircraft in its normal configuration sets a world speed record.
- October 10 – A British Royal Air Force English Electric Canberra wins the 1953 London to Christchurch air race, flying 11,792 miles (18,977 km) from the UK to New Zealand in 23 hours 50 minutes.
- October 14
  - A Sabena Convair CV-240-12 (registration OO-AWQ) loses engine power just after taking off from Frankfurt International Airport in Frankfurt, West Germany, and crashes, killing all 44 people on board.
  - Test pilot Scott Crossfield reaches Mach 1.96 (1,262 mph (2,031 km/h) – only 25 mph (40 km/h) below Mach 2 – in a Douglas Skyrocket.
- October 16 – Flying a Douglas XF4D-1, Robert Rahm sets a world air speed over distance record over a 100 km (62 mi) closed-circuit course of 728.11 mph (1,171.78 km/h) at Muroc Dry Lake, California.
- October 19 – During a domestic flight in Mexico from Aeropuerto del Norte outside Monterrey to the Nueva Ciudad Guerrero airstrip carrying officials and reporters to the inauguration of the Falcon Dam, a Pemex Douglas DC-3 (registration XC-PMX) crashes in a ravine near Mamulique, killing all 15 people on board.
- October 20 – A Transworld Airlines Lockheed Constellation makes the first non-stop scheduled passenger flight across the continental United States.
- October 28 – SABENA becomes the first airline to offer transatlantic service from the north of England when it inaugurates a Brussels-Manchester-New York City route with a flight by a Douglas DC-6B (registration OO-CTH).
- October 29
  - The British Commonwealth Pacific Airlines Douglas DC-6 Resolution, operating as Flight 304, crashes near Woodside, California, while on initial approach to San Francisco International Airport in San Mateo County, California, killing all 19 people on board. Among the dead is pianist William Kapell.
  - Flying a North American YF-100A Super Sabre, U.S. Air Force Lieutenant Colonel Frank K. "Speedy Pete" Everest sets a world speed record of 755.149 mph (1,215.295 km/h).
- October 30 – The United States National Security Council document NSC 162/2 is adopted. It states that the United States military posture must remain strong, "with emphasis on the capability of inflicting massive retaliatory damage by offensive striking power," and that "the United States will consider nuclear weapons to be as available for use as other munitions." The document brings the term "massive retaliation" into general use and inaugurates the "New Look" defense policy of President Dwight D. Eisenhower, which reduces American military spending and force levels and places a great reliance on strategic power, particularly on long-range nuclear bombers, to defend the United States and to deter foreign militaries from aggressive activities abroad.

=== November ===
- The United Kingdom's first operational atomic bomb, "Blue Danube," is delivered to the Bomber Command stockpile at RAF Wittering in eastern England, concluding the High Explosive Research project to develop it.
- November 3 – A Lloyd Aéreo Boliviano Douglas DC-3-314 (registration CP-600) crashes on the top of the Rodeo Pampa mountain range south of Tarabuco, Bolivia, killing all 28 people on board.
- November 12 – The LADE Junkers Ju 52/3msai Rio Negro (registration T-159) collides in mid-air with an Argentine Air Force de Havilland DH.104 Dove near Villa Mugueta, Argentina. The Dove crashes, killing all seven people on board. The Ju 52 pilot attempts an emergency landing but loses control just before touchdown and the Ju 52 also crashes, killing all 13 people on board.
- November 15 - The first air mail service to Death Valley National Monument begins, landing at Furnace Creek Airport (L06) outside Furnace Creek, California. It is part of airmail route AM-105.
- November 17 – Two United States Air Force Kaiser-Frazer C-119F Flying Boxcars collide in mid-air due to an engine failure while flying as part of a 12-plane formation dropping paratroopers over the Holland Drop Zone at Fort Bragg, North Carolina. One C-119F makes a successful emergency landing, but the other descends over the drop zone, striking a number of paratroopers and killing 10 of them before crashing, killing all five people aboard the plane.
- November 20 – Scott Crossfield flies the Douglas Skyrocket to Mach 2.005 at an altitude of 62,000 feet (19,000 meters) in a dive over Antelope Valley in California. It is the first manned flight to exceed Mach 2, and it sets a new world airspeed record of 1,291 mph (2,078 km/h) for manned flight.
- November 30 – Former Governor of Michigan Kim Sigler and all four of his passengers die when the Beechcraft Bonanza he is piloting crashes into a television broadcast tower near Augusta, Michigan, on a foggy night.

=== December ===
- Northwest Orient Airlines begins using Douglas DC-6Bs between the continental United States and Hawaii.
- December 2 – The Douglas X-3 Stiletto completes its 20th flight. The National Advisory Committee for Aeronautics (NACA) will turn it over to the United States Air Force for its next six flights, after which the Air Force will return it to NACA.
- December 4 – An Aviaco Bristol 170 Freighter 21 crashes into the side of a mountain peak obscured by rain near Guadarrama, Spain, 20 minutes prior to an anticipated landing at Barajas Airport in Madrid, killing 23 of the 33 people on board.
- December 11 – A Royal Air Force Avro Shackleton MR.2 crashes into the sea off Argyll, Scotland, during an antisubmarine warfare exercise, killing its entire crew of 10.
- December 12
  - An Indian Airlines Douglas C-47A-DK Skytrain experiences engine trouble just after takeoff from Sonegaon Airport in Nagpur, India. When the pilot attempts to return to the airport, he banks too steeply, and the aircraft loses height rapidly, crashes in a field, and burns, killing 13 of the 14 people on board.
  - Flying the Bell X-1A, Chuck Yeager reaches an altitude of 22,280 meters (73,100 feet), where he sets a new world speed record of Mach 2.44, equal to 2,608 km/h (1,621 mph) at that altitude, in level flight.
- December 19 –A Sabena Convair CV-240 (registration OO-AWO) strikes the ground 2.5 km (1.6 mi) short of the runway while on final approach to Kloten Airport in low visibility conditions. One passenger is killed, but the other 39 passengers and all three crew members survive.
- December 20 – Searching for the nine-man crew of a United States Navy Consolidated PB4Y-2 Privateer that had disappeared while tracking Typhoon Doris, a U.S. Navy Douglas R4D-8 Skytrain crashes into a volcanic crater on Agrihan in the Mariana Islands, killing its entire 10-man crew. Its wreckage will not be discovered until December 26.
- December 29 – A French Air Force Nord 2501 Noratlas disappears over the Pyrénées Mountains with the loss of all 10 people on board during a flight from French Algeria to Mont-De-Marsan Airport in France. A search party will discover its wreckage on Pic de Costabonne on January 5, 1954.

== First flights ==
=== January ===
- January 2 - Sud-Ouest Djinn
- January 3 - Cessna 310
- January 5 - Ambrosini Sagittario
- January 14 – Convair XF2Y-1, prototype of the Convair F2Y Sea Dart (inadvertent short flight during intended fast taxi run)
- January 27 - Hurel-Dubois HD.31
- January 29 - Morane-Saulnier MS.755 Fleuret

=== March ===
- March 2 - Sud-Ouest SO 9000 Trident
- March 4 - Bell HSL
- March 7 – Ilyushin Il-40 (NATO reporting name "Brawny")

=== April ===
- April 9 – Convair XF2Y-1, prototype of the Convair F2Y Sea Dart (official first flight)
- April 21 - Doman LZ-5

=== May ===
- May 9 - SNCASO Farfadet
- May 16 - Leduc O.21
- May 18 - Douglas DC-7
- May 25 - North American YF-100A, prototype of the North American F-100 Super Sabre, by George Welch

=== June ===
- June 10 - Potez 75
- June 14 - Blackburn Beverley
- June 15 – Farman F.520 Monitor III
- June 19 – Piaggio P.149

=== July ===
- July 3 – North American FJ-3 Fury
- July 20 – Martin B-57 Canberra

=== August ===
- Westland Whirlwind
- August 1 – SNCASE Baroudeur

=== September ===
- Lualdi-Tassotti ES 53
- Mooney M20
- September 3 - Pilatus P-3
- September 21 - DINFIA IA 35 Huanquero

=== October ===
- October 13 - North American X-10
- October 13 - Short Seamew
- October 24 - Convair YF-102, prototype of the F-102 Delta Dagger

=== December ===
- December 10 – Beech Super 18
- December 14 – Miles M.77 Sparrowjet
- December 23 – Lockheed XFV-1 (unplanned "jump" prior to first official flight)

== Entered service ==
- Late 1953 – McDonnell F3H Demon with the United States Navy

=== January ===
- January 13 – Vickers Viscount with British European Airways

=== May ===
- Westland Wyvern with 813 Naval Air Squadron, Fleet Air Arm, Royal Navy

=== November ===
- November 29 - Douglas DC-7 with American Airlines

== Retirements ==
- Douglas Skyrocket by the National Advisory Committee for Aeronautics.
- Henschel Hs 123 by the Spanish Air Force
- Lockheed R6V Constitution by the United States Navy
- Martin AM Mauler by the United States Naval Reserve
- North American F-82 Twin Mustang by the United States Air Force
- Saunders-Roe SR.45 Princess
