= Aer Lualdi =

Italian helicopter manufacturer (1953–1964)

Aer Lualdi & C SpA
- Industry: Aviation
- Founded: 1953; 73 years ago Rome, Italy
- Founder: Carlo Lualdi
- Defunct: 1964
- Products: Helicopter

Aer Lualdi & C SpA was an Italian helicopter manufacturer. The company produced several prototypes.

== History ==
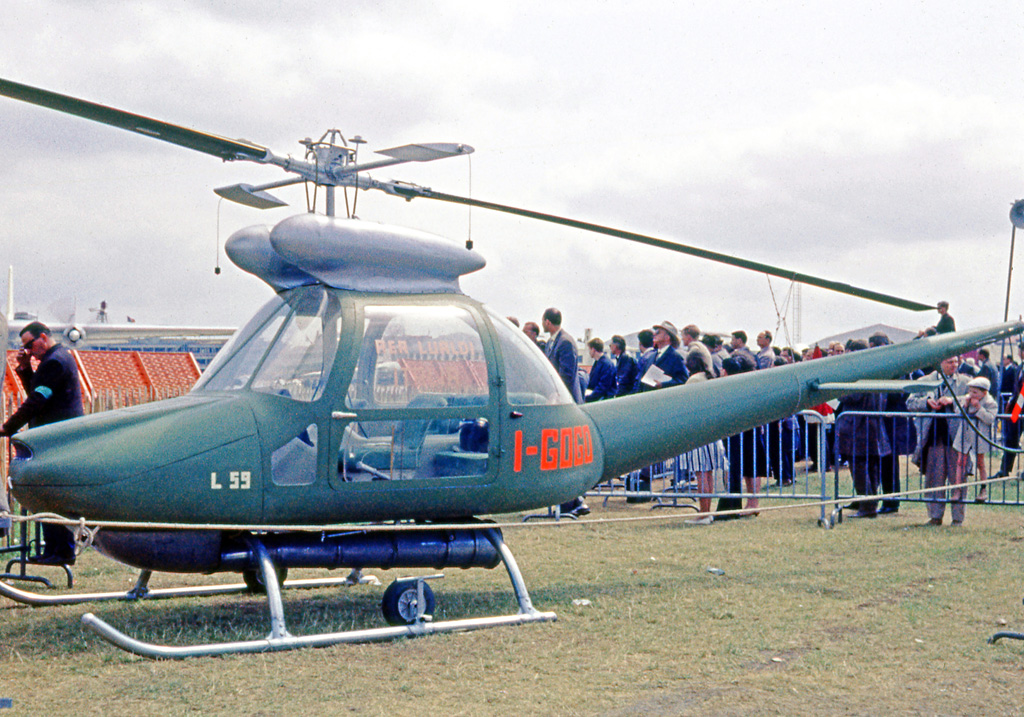
The L.59 prototype for civil and military testing, exhibited at the 1963 Paris Air Show.

Aer Lualdi was founded in Rome in 1953 by Carlo Lualdi, who had purchased a license to produce a Hiller-designed rotor system (the Hiller "Rotor-Matic") and thereby became the Italian agent for Hiller Helicopters.

Carlo Lualdi had previously used this rotor system in his experimental Lualdi-Tassotti ES 53, which featured a rotor design based on Hiller with a controllable transverse secondary rotor and first flew at Campoformido in 1953. With his new company Lualdi now built a succession of more powerful helicopters incorporating the Rotor-Matic system with a gyro stabilizer of his own design.

The first helicopter following the ES 53 was the L.55, an all-metal prototype which was followed by the L.57 and culminated in the four-seat L.59 which was selected for production by Macchi. One full prototype was built, and the commercial type certificate issued in August 1961.

Air Lualdi never went into full production and closed down in 1964, after the L.59 was cancelled.

== Aer Lualdi aircraft ==
- Aer Lualdi L.55
- Aer Lualdi L.57
- Aer Lualdi L.59
- Lualdi-Tassotti ES 53

== Literature ==
- R.Simpson "Airlife's Helicopter and Rotorcraft", 1998
