= Aer Lualdi L.57 =

Prototype Italian helicopter

L.57

General information
- Type: Single-seat light helicopter
- National origin: Italy
- Manufacturer: Aer Lualdi
- Designer: Carlo Lualdi and Sergio Tassotti
- Number built: 1

History
- Developed from: Aer Lualdi L.55
- Variant: Aer Lualdi L.59

The Aer Lualdi L.57 was a prototype Italian helicopter, a further refinement of Lualdi's ES 53 and L.55 designs.

The aircraft featured a larger main rotor than its predecessors, a fibreglass tail rotor, and an autopilot. The Aircraft could accommodate 4 people and was powered by a Lycoming-O360 A1A. Only one L.57 was ever built and the aircraft was never put into production.
