= Moore County Airport (North Carolina) =

- IATA: SOP; ICAO: KSOP; FAA LID: SOP

Summary
- Airport type: Public
- Owner: Moore County
- Operator: Moore County Airport Authority
- Location: Whispering Pines, North Carolina
- Elevation AMSL: 461 ft / 140.5 m
- Coordinates: 35°14′14″N 79°23′28″W
- Website: MooreCountyAirport.com

Map

Runways
Direction	Length		Surface
Direction	ft	m	Surface
5/23	6,502	1,982	Asphalt

Moore County Airport (IATA: SOP, ICAO: KSOP, FAA LID: SOP) is a public airport located 3 miles (5 km) north of Southern Pines and 5 miles northeast of Pinehurst, in Moore County, North Carolina, USA. The airport covers 500 acres (202 ha) and has one runway. The current runway is paved, 6,502 feet long and 150 feet wide. SOP is primarily used for general aviation.

US Airways Express carrier CCAir operated flights to Charlotte with various turboprop aircraft from 1991-2002. Service ended shortly after the September 11 attacks. Commercial service returned briefly with the arrival of Delta Air Lines in 2006. The airline operated seasonal CRJ flights to its Atlanta hub under the Delta Connection banner. The service ended in November 2007. West Coast airline JSX, started special single summer seasonal service in the summer of 2020 to the airport with a partnership with the nearby Pinehurst Golf Resort. These flights, marketed as "pop-up flights" originated at Dallas Love Field and Westchester County Airport and are targeted toward wealthy company executives going to golf for 3–4 days.

== History ==
The facility was founded in 1929 as Knollwood Airport by the Tufts family, who had previously established the Pinehurst Resort. It was taken over by Moore County in 1935. From 1942 to 1945 it was operated by the US Army Air Force as Knollwood Auxiliary Army Airfield. In 1945, it was purchased from the Army by Resort Airlines, which renamed it Pinehurst-Southern Pines Airport.

== Relationship with Whispering Pines ==
Most of the Moore County Airport property lies within the extraterritorial jurisdiction of Whispering Pines, NC, prompting debate over who had ultimate regulatory power over it — the village of Whispering Pines or the Moore County Airport Authority. Because of this, the Airport Authority and the Whispering Pines Village Council have butted heads on occasion.

The rift was exacerbated by the Airport Authority's $2 million proposal — that was approved by lawmakers — to build several large hangars using taxpayer funds to better serve its local customers. There was some concern within the village that the hangars would attract more aircraft and create additional noise. As a result, the Whispering Pines Village Council hinted at its desire to limit the airport's growth, which could stunt the economic growth of the Sandhills and stall job growth.

However, a recent court ruling said the village had no legal jurisdiction over the airport because it operates under an independent authority that was established in 1993. Whispering Pines decided not to appeal the ruling as a result.

== See also ==
- List of airports in North Carolina
