= Lualdi-Tassotti ES 53 =

1953 Italian experimental helicopter

ES 53

General information
- Type: Single-seat light helicopter
- National origin: Italy
- Manufacturer: Aer Lualdi
- Designer: Carlo Lualdi and Sergio Tassotti
- Number built: 1

History
- First flight: September 1953
- Variants: Aer Lualdi L.55

The Lualdi-Tassotti ES 53 was an Italian experimental helicopter designed by Carlo Lualdi around a Hiller-designed rotor system and a gyro stabiliser of his own design. It first flew at Campoformido in September 1953.

The helicopter was powered by a single 63.4 kW (85 hp) Continental C85 engine and proved so promising that Lualdi purchased a licence to produce the Hiller rotor system in Italy, and formed a new company, Aer Lualdi to develop and market his designs as the Aer Lualdi L.55.

== Specifications ==
Data from The Illustrated Encyclopedia of Helicopters

General characteristics

- Crew: 1
- Length: 6.55 m (21 ft 6 in)
- Height: 2.6 m (8 ft 6 in)
- Empty weight: 400 kg (882 lb)
- Gross weight: 850 kg (1,874 lb)
- Powerplant: 1 × Continental C85 4-cylinder air-cooled horizontally-opposed piston engine, 63 kW (85 hp)
- Main rotor diameter: 2 × 7.32 m (24 ft 0 in)

Performance

- Maximum speed: 110 km/h (68 mph, 59 kn)
- Range: 250 km (160 mi, 130 nmi)
- Service ceiling: 2,000 m (6,600 ft)
