= Quicktrans =

US military virtual cargo airline (1950–1994)

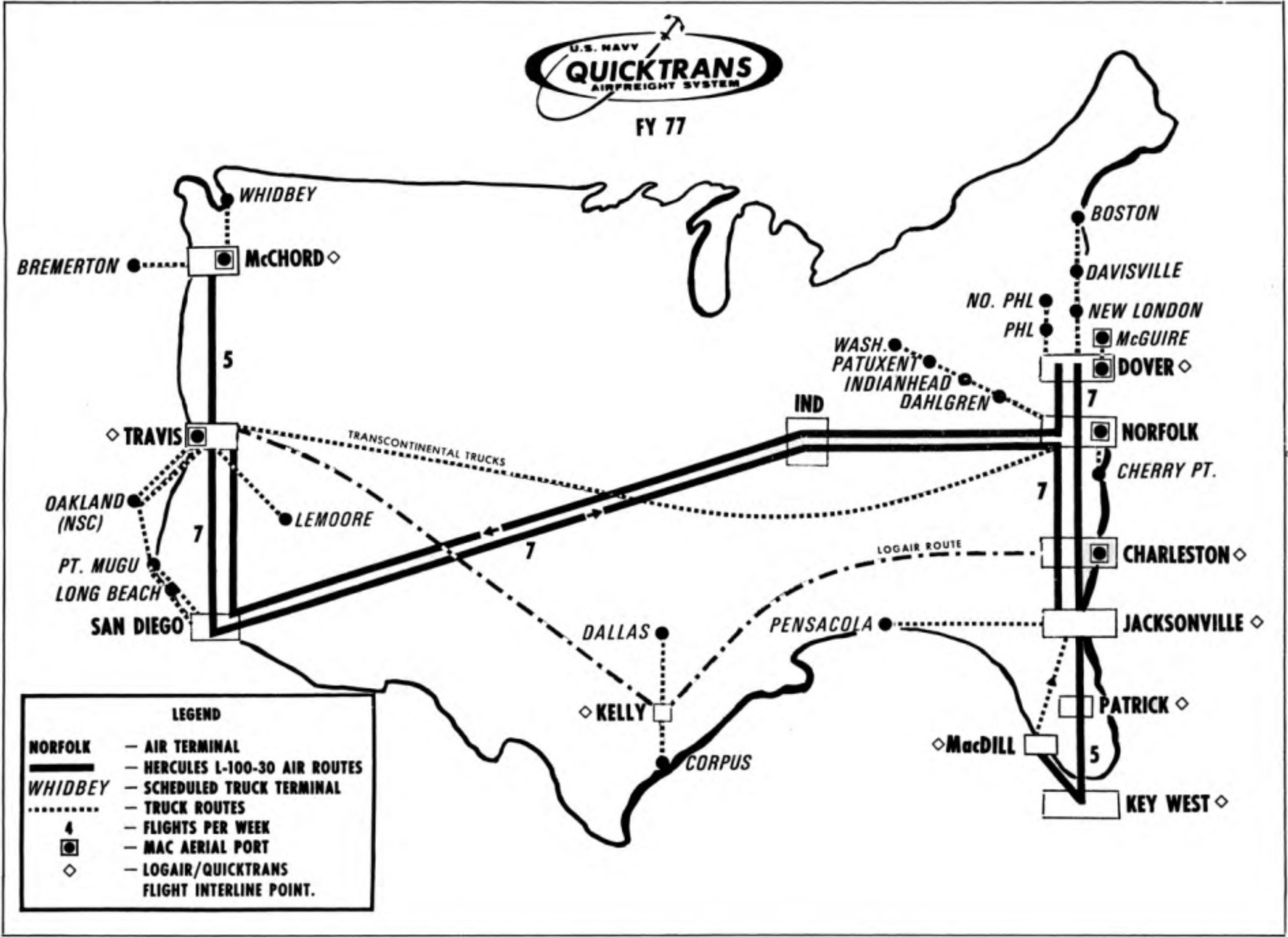
- Fiscal year 1977 system map. Note the logo.
- Commenced operations: July 5, 1950
- Ceased operations: September 30, 1994
- Fleet size: see Fleet below
- Destinations: see Destinations below
- Parent company: United States Navy
- Headquarters: Norfolk Naval Air Station

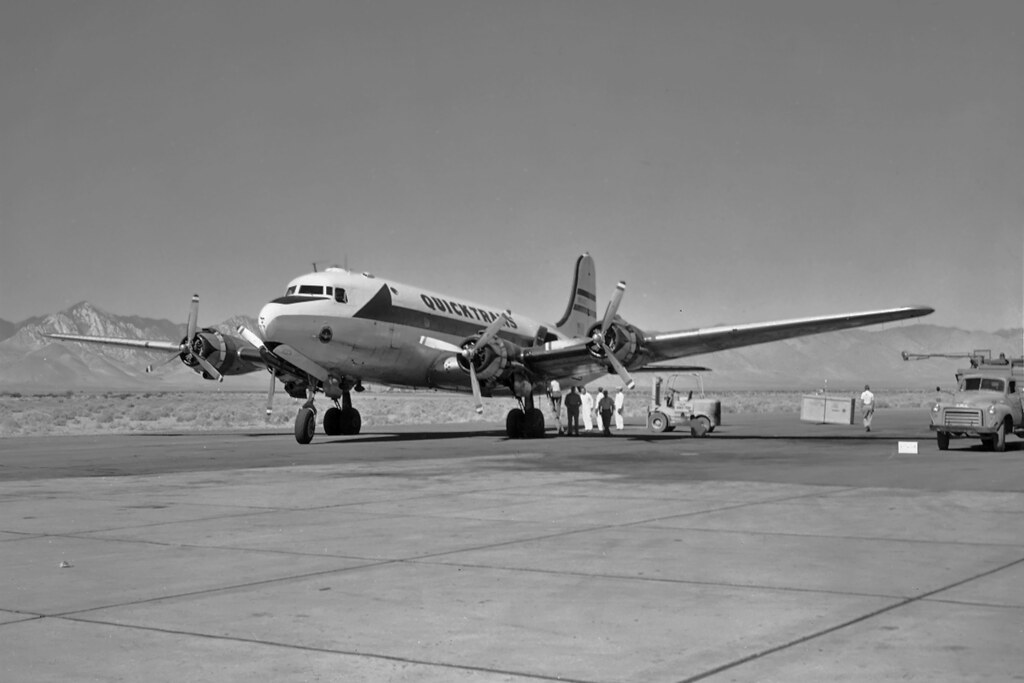
United States Overseas Airlines DC-4 China Lake 1959

Quicktrans (1950–1994) was a domestic United States Navy air freight virtual airline, initially overseen by the Navy's Bureau of Supplies and Accounts (aka BuSandA), linking major Navy facilities. Apart from providing the Navy with fast, low-cost transport, Quicktrans was an early experiment that showed efficient air cargo was possible, and an important source of freight business for early US air carriers. The Air Force operated the similar Logair, inspired in part by Quicktrans. Quicktrans was not, however, identical to the larger Logair. For instance, unlike Logair, Quicktrans usually relied on a single air vendor, eventually added trucks, becoming multimodal, and came to use the Lockheed L-100 Hercules as a sole aircraft type. Quicktrans outlasted Logair, but was also ultimately a victim of post-Cold War rationalization and the availability of commercial networks like Federal Express.

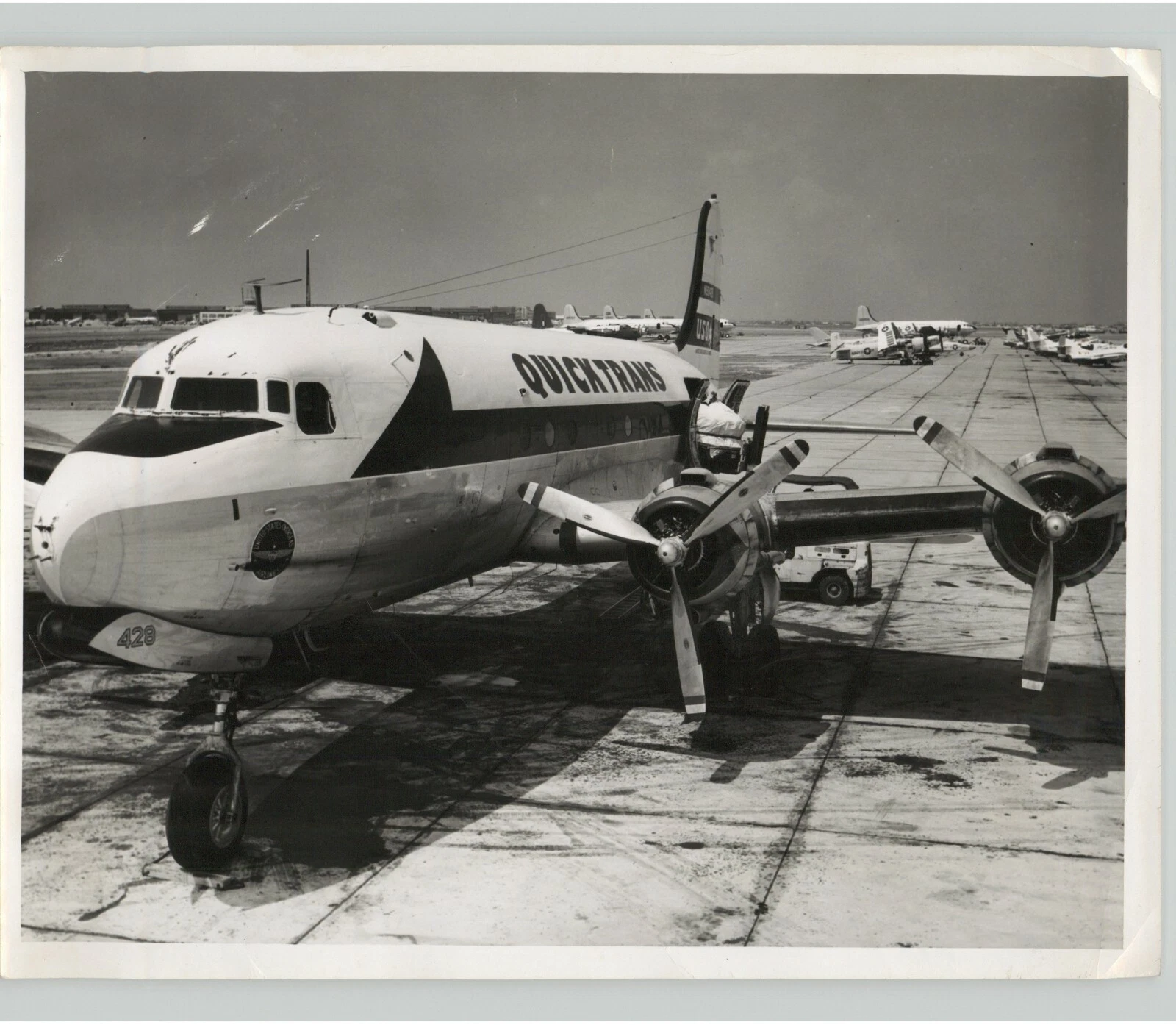
United States Overseas Airlines DC-4 Norfolk 1960

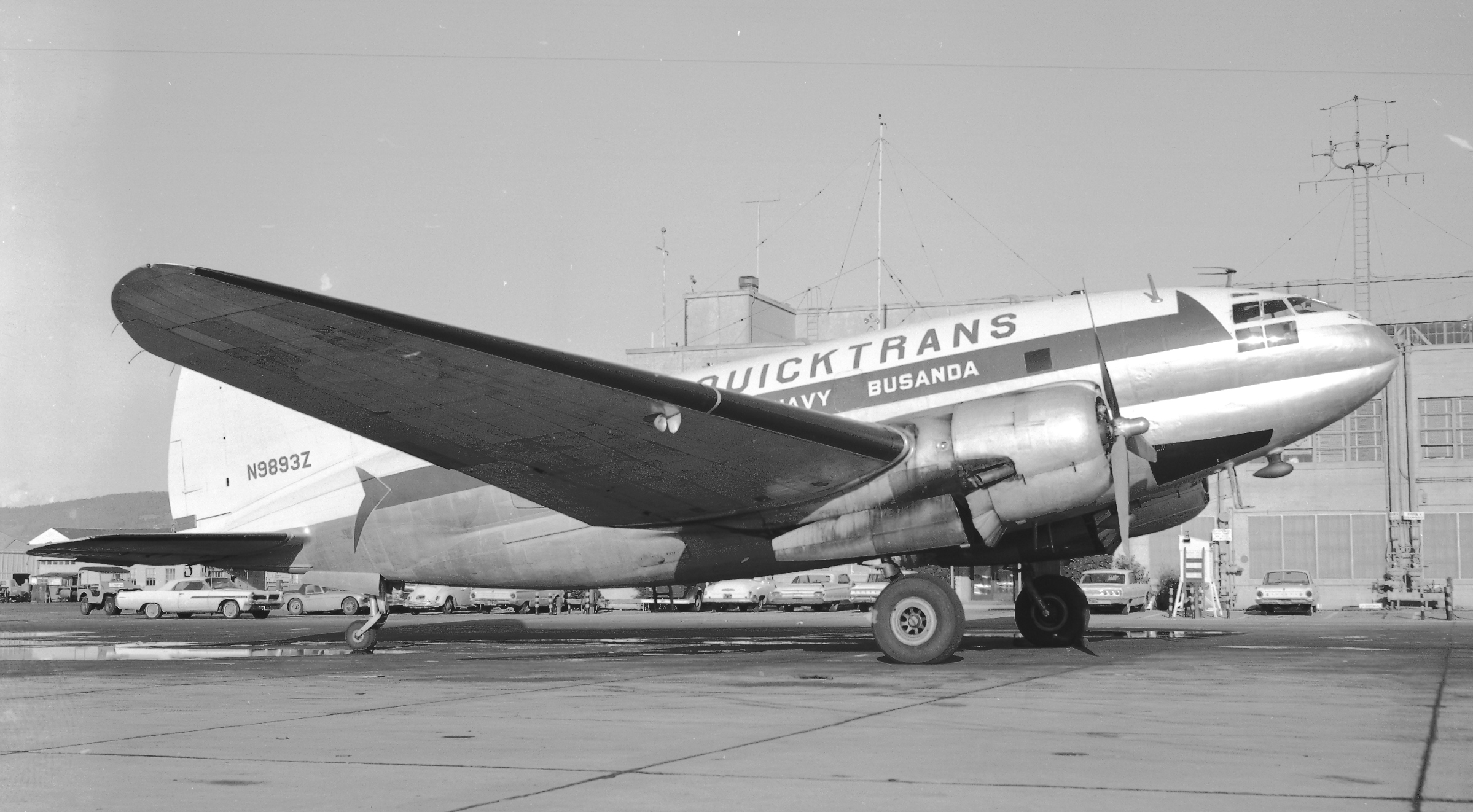
Capitol Airways C-46 Oakland 1965. BuSandA was the Navy office that originally oversaw Quicktrans. Slick Airways was the prime contractor at the time, Capitol was under subcontract, see text. See External links for a photo of this livery in color

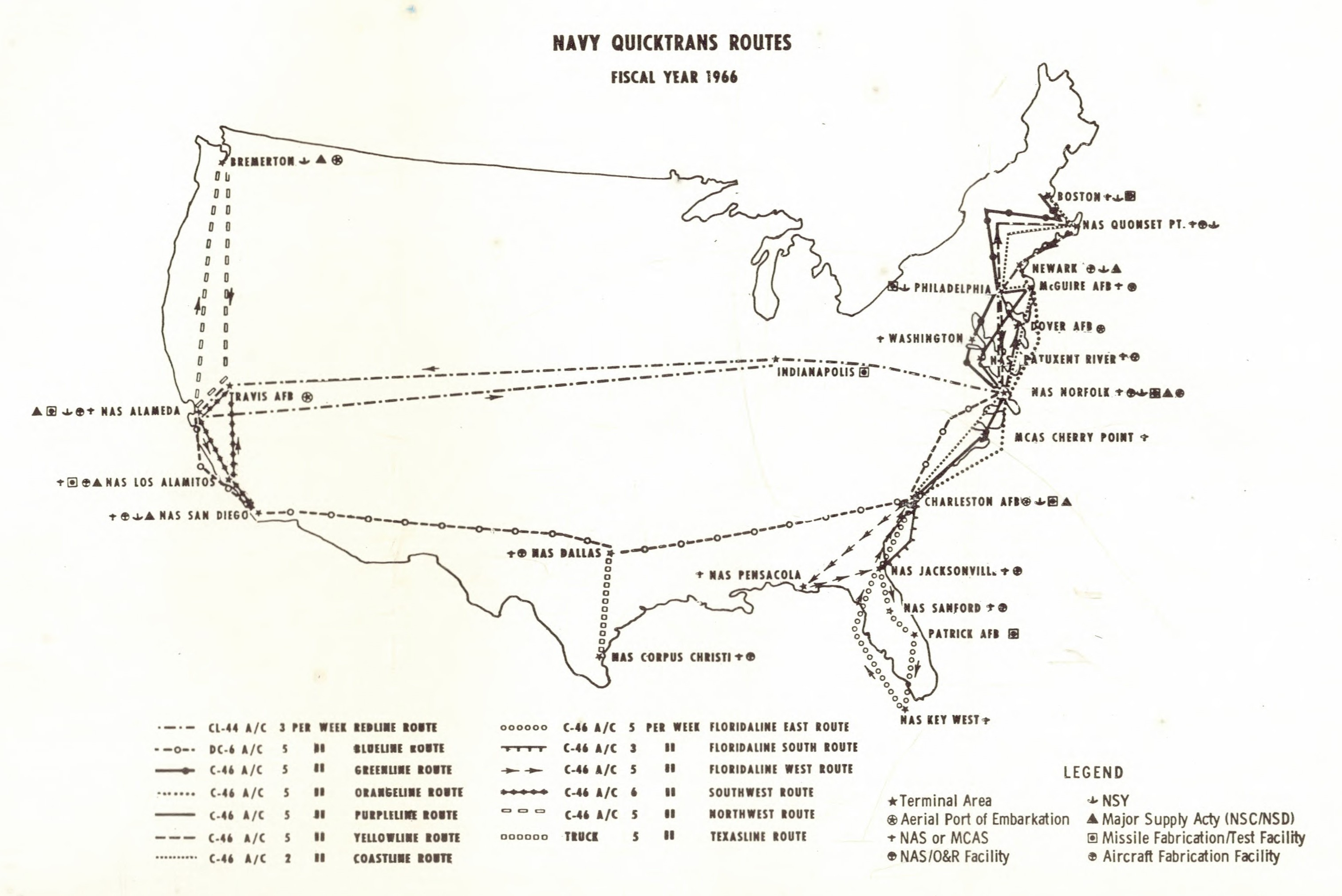
System map as of FY1966. Note the large number of C-46 routes and the east coast shorthaul routes

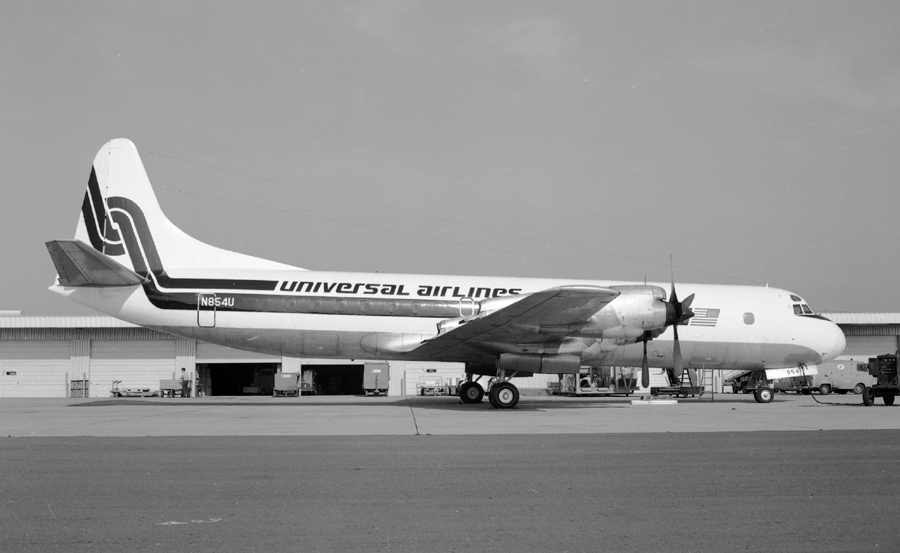
L-188CF Electra Oakland 1971. Universal introduced these to Quicktrans in 1968 (FY1969), after Congress mandated turbine aircraft

== History ==
=== Startup ===
Quicktrans inaugurated 5 July 1950. Driven by a need to speed 96,000 pounds of ammunition across country for the Korean War, BuSandA contracted Slick Airways, an early scheduled cargo airline, to move it in what it called "Operation Quicktrans." That worked well, so it became a long-term agreement with Slick flying daily transcontinental flights with Curtiss C-46s, cutting time of delivery of urgent items from five to eight days down to one or two. The service realized very high efficiency due to highly utilized aircraft almost 100% full, this in turn attributed to having the aircraft under Navy control. Cost per pound was competitive with or better than commercial trucks or Railway Express.

Quicktrans remained a C-46 program through FY1955 (Federal fiscal years ended June until 1977, and September thereafter), contracting a second year with Slick, then FY1953 and FY1954 with Flying Tiger Line then a year with Resort Airlines. Quicktrans then transitioned to Douglas DC-4s, first with California Eastern Airways for FY1956 and FY1957, then a year with Transocean Air Lines, followed by FY1959 thru FY1961 with United States Overseas Airlines. In FY1957, Logair transported 126.6 million ton-miles, about 7 times the 17.7 million ton-miles of Quicktrans. As nearby photos show, in the early years, aircraft flew in Quicktrans livery. In FY1960, Logair had 50 C-46s and 18 DC-4s against just eight DC-4s for Quicktrans. As well as being generally single-carrier (as opposed to Logair's multiple vendors) another difference between the two systems was that Quicktrans carriers provided ground-handling, whereas the Air Force provided it for the Logair system.

=== 1960s ===
Slick retained the Quicktrans contract for FY1962 through FY1965, the rest of the decade the contractor was Universal Airlines (known as Zantop Air Transport through calendar 1966) with FY1966 a rare instance of a split Quicktrans contract: most went to Zantop, but part went to Flying Tiger.

During the 1960s, Slick at different times flew the Lockheed L-1049H and Douglas DC-6A for Quicktrans, as well as the DC-4. Slick subcontracted C-46 work to Capitol Airways (see nearby photo). Slick experimented splitting L-1049H capacity between commercial and Quicktrans use, the Super Constellation being too large for Quicktrans alone. In FY1966, Flying Tiger flew the Canadair CL-44 for Quicktrans (visible on the FY1966 map shown nearby), while Zantop flew DC-6s and C-46s. At the time, neither airline flew the types the other used for Quicktrans. However, the FY1966 map shows the prevalence of C-46s even 21 years after the end of World War II, flying ten out of 12 routes, including a network of east coast short routes. Congress wanted the C-46 gone and the military saw it as dangerous and obsolete, but Zantop retired its DC-4s, forcing the Navy back to C-46s.

In the late 1960s, Congress insisted Quicktrans and Logair transition to turbine equipment.

Universal's response was to introduce Lockheed L-188 Electras to Quicktrans in FY1969. By the late 1960s, ground handling ("terminal services") split into a separate contract. In FY1968, this went to a Universal subsidiary, Universal Aircraft Services, and in FY1969 to an Overseas National Airways (ONA) subsidiary, Automated Terminal Services (ATS). These were significant operations. In 1970, ATS had 400 employees. And in 1966, the Naval Supply Systems Command (NAVSUP) replaced BuSandA. The NAVSUP office overseeing Quicktrans was the Material Transportation Office (NAVMTO) based in Norfolk. Over the course of the 1960s, Quicktrans markings disappeared, as photos show. The decade started with full Quicktrans liveries. It ended with no markings. In an intermediate stage, in 1965, at least two Flying Tiger CL-44s had discreet Quicktrans markings on an otherwise a standard livery (see External links for a photo of N1002T, N449T had the same marking in 1965).

=== 1970s and beyond: intermodal, interlining and single-bidder Hercules ===
In 1970, ONA brought DC-9-30CF jets to Quicktrans. The 1970s saw three significant evolutions:

- Growth of trucks in Quicktrans, running coast-to-coast and regional, as shown on FY1977 Quicktrans map. The transcontinental truck lines grew into Consolidated Truck Service, or Contruck, running between Norfolk, North Island, San Diego and Travis AFB with an average transit time of four days. The largest regional truck service was the Northeast Dedicated Truck Service. As of 1993, these totalled $4.7 million in annual spend.
- The FY1977 map also shows close integration with Logair and the Military Airlift Command (MAC; the sole source for overseas airlift) at gateways such as Charleston AFB and Travis AFB. Some Navy points, like Corpus Christi, were reached via interlining with the Logair network. By contrast, in 1973, Corpus Christi was reached through a Quicktrans route.
- Lockheed L-100-30 Hercules as sole aircraft type. The Navy decided it wanted a type that could work seamlessly with the military's own fleet and which could carry oversize items like helicopter blades and periscopes. So it specified certain abilities (e.g. able to carry eight full or 16 half military 463L pallets, 46,000lb load capability and to ability to load/unload from an end). Only the L-100-30 met those requirements. The FY1977 map was an early version of a Hercules-only system. In FY1973 Quicktrans still operated Electras along with Hercules.

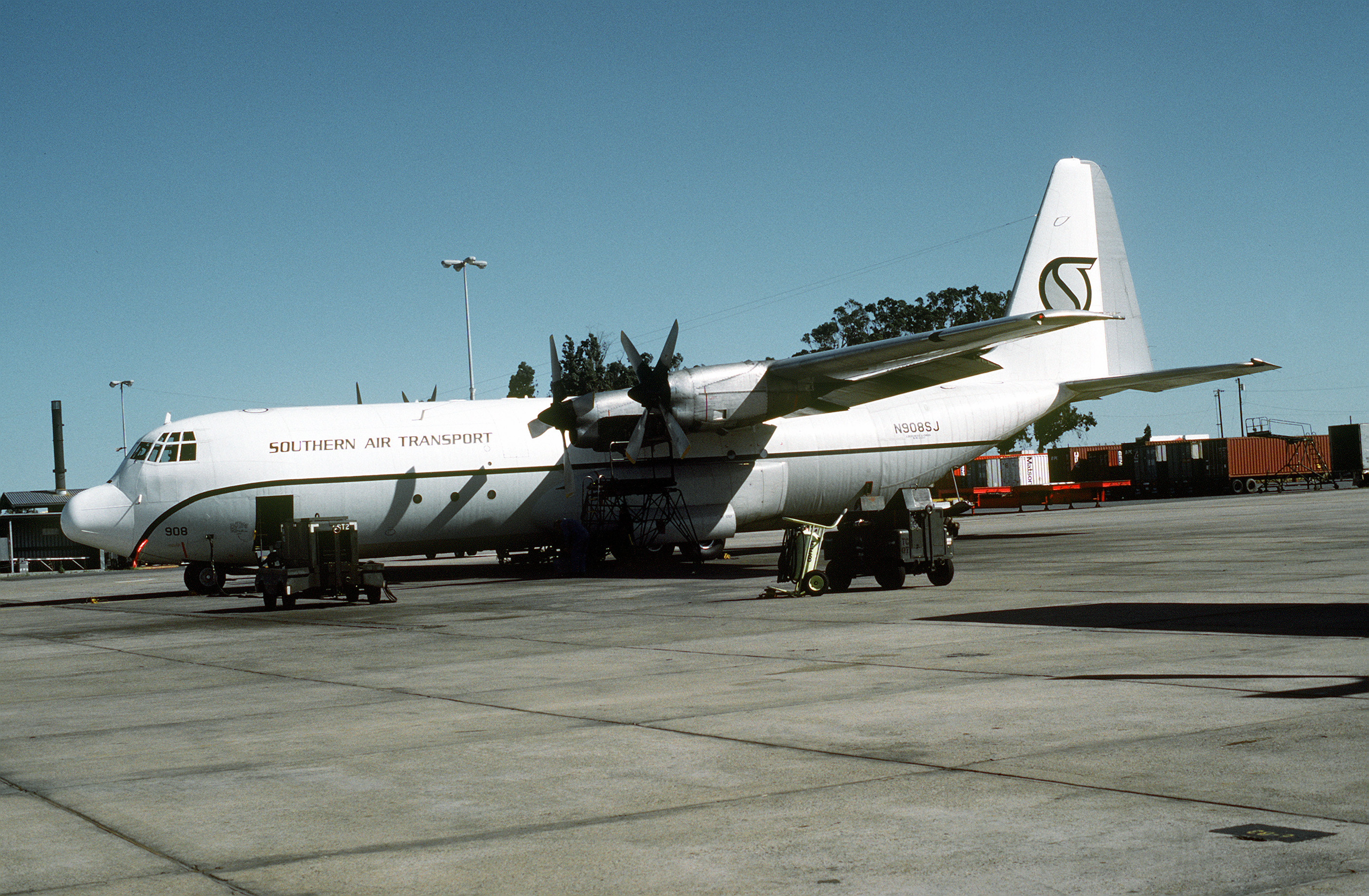
Southern Air Transport (SAT) L-100-30 at Travis AFB in 1993, after the 1992 end of Logair but before the 1994 end of Quicktrans. SAT was a monopoly supplier of L-100-30s to Quicktrans 1986–1994

The L-100-30 mandate meant the Navy faced a sole bidder. The Civil Aeronautics Board (CAB), the (now defunct) Federal agency that, at the time, tightly regulated most commercial air transport, acknowledged the L-100-30 monopoly in 1977 (and the resulting increase in prices), when it certificated Southern Air Transport to create an L-100-30 competitor, a CAB certificate being required to bid on Quicktrans. The sole certificated L-100-30 provider was Trans International Airlines (TIA) (which inherited the Hercules in a 1976 merger with Saturn Airways). But SAT didn't become a Quicktrans operator until 1986, when TIA's parent company liquidated TIA (by then called Transamerica Airlines) in a corporate restructuring. SAT acquired TIA's L-100-30 fleet and thus the L-100-30 Quicktrans monopoly.

There was one other US L-100-30 operator, Alaska International Air (AIA). But AIA obtained a certificate only after 1979 airline deregulation, and by then its owner was focused on passengers. After failing to buy a couple of passenger airlines, its owner turned AIA into MarkAir in 1984, primarily a passenger airline. MarkAir flew a few L-100-30s until 1992, eventually selling them to SAT.

However, MarkAir's L-100-30 fleet was too small to compete for Quicktrans. A 1986 study noted the same Quicktrans L-100-30 monopoly issue.

=== End ===
After the Cold War, logistics were centralized across all US armed services under the Defense Logistics Agency. The DLA now controlled inventory and distribution at Naval Supply Centers, which accounted for 50% of Quicktrans movements by weight and the DLA was under no obligation to keep using Quicktrans. The DLA had its own preferred solutions, which included Federal Express and UPS. Quicktrans came to an end in September 1994.

== Carriers ==
- California Eastern
- Flying Tiger
- Overseas National
- Resort
- Saturn
- Slick
- Southern Air Transport
- TIA (Transamerica)
- Transocean
- US Overseas
- Universal
- Zantop Air Transport

== Fleet ==
Fiscal Year 1955:

- 5 Curtiss C-46

Fiscal Year 1960:

- 8 Douglas DC-4

Fiscal Year 1968:

- 12 Douglas DC-7BF

Other aircraft known to fly for Quicktrans:

- Canadair CL-44D
- Douglas DC-6A
- Douglas DC-9-30CF
- Lockheed L-188CF Electra
- Lockheed L-100-30 Hercules

== Destinations ==
1951—Cargo stops:

- Newark
- Philadelphia
- Washington, DC
- Norfolk
- San Diego
- Burbank
- San Francisco

Refueling stops:

- Chicago
- Kansas City
- Amarillo, Texas
- Phoenix

== See also ==
- Logair
