= Aer Lualdi L.59 =

Italian helicopter

L.59
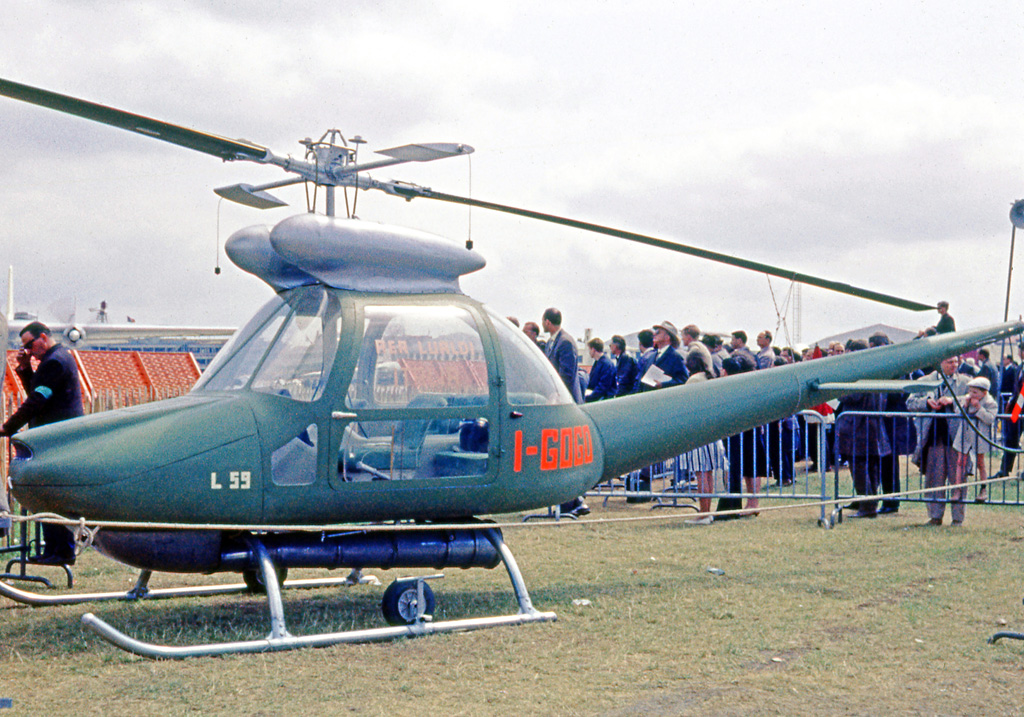
- The prototype Lualdi L.59 exhibited at the 1963 Paris Air Show

General information
- Type: Light general-purpose helicopter
- Manufacturer: Aer Lualdi
- Number built: 2

History
- First flight: 1960

The Aer Lualdi L.59 was an Italian helicopter that failed to reach quantity production.

== Design ==
The L.59 was the culmination of work done by Carlo Lualdi throughout the 1950s, and was an enlarged version of his earlier two-seat designs. The L.59 featured four seats accommodated in an extensively glazed cabin. Of conventional pod-and-boom design with skid landing gear, the aircraft had the slightly unusual feature of having its engine mounted in the nose, turning the main rotor by a long driveshaft that reached through the cabin.

== Production and operation ==
Lualdi was able to interest Macchi in the design and two Macchi-built prototypes began flight tests in 1960. Civil certification was achieved in August the following year. Although faultless, the performance of the L.59 was not comparable with that of other helicopters on the market at the time. Macchi planned an initial production batch of 50 machines, but only a single example was sold - one of the prototypes was purchased by the Italian Army for evaluation purposes. No order resulted. The prototype was exhibited at the 1963 Paris Air Show, but again, no orders were obtained for the type.

== Surviving aircraft ==
An Aer Lualdi L.59 wearing the Italian military serial MM576 is preserved in the Centro Polifunziale Ferruccio Lamborghini at Dosso near Ferrara.

== Specifications (L.59) ==
Data from Jane's All The World's Aircraft 1961–62

General characteristics

- Crew: 1
- Capacity: 3 passengers
- Length: 9.08 m (29 ft 9 in)
- Height: 3.00 m (9 ft 10 in)
- Empty weight: 740 kg (1,631 lb)
- Gross weight: 1,200 kg (2,646 lb)
- Powerplant: 1 × Continental IO-470-D air-cooled flat-six, 190 kW (260 hp)
- Main rotor diameter: 10.60 m (34 ft 9 in)
- Main rotor area: 88.2 m^{2} (949 sq ft)

Performance

- Maximum speed: 160 km/h (99 mph, 86 kn)
- Cruise speed: 139 km/h (86 mph, 75 kn)
- Endurance: 3.5 hr
- Service ceiling: 5,900 m (19,400 ft)
- Rate of climb: 4.2 m/s (820 ft/min)
