= Ralph Parr =

American double-flying ace of the Korean War

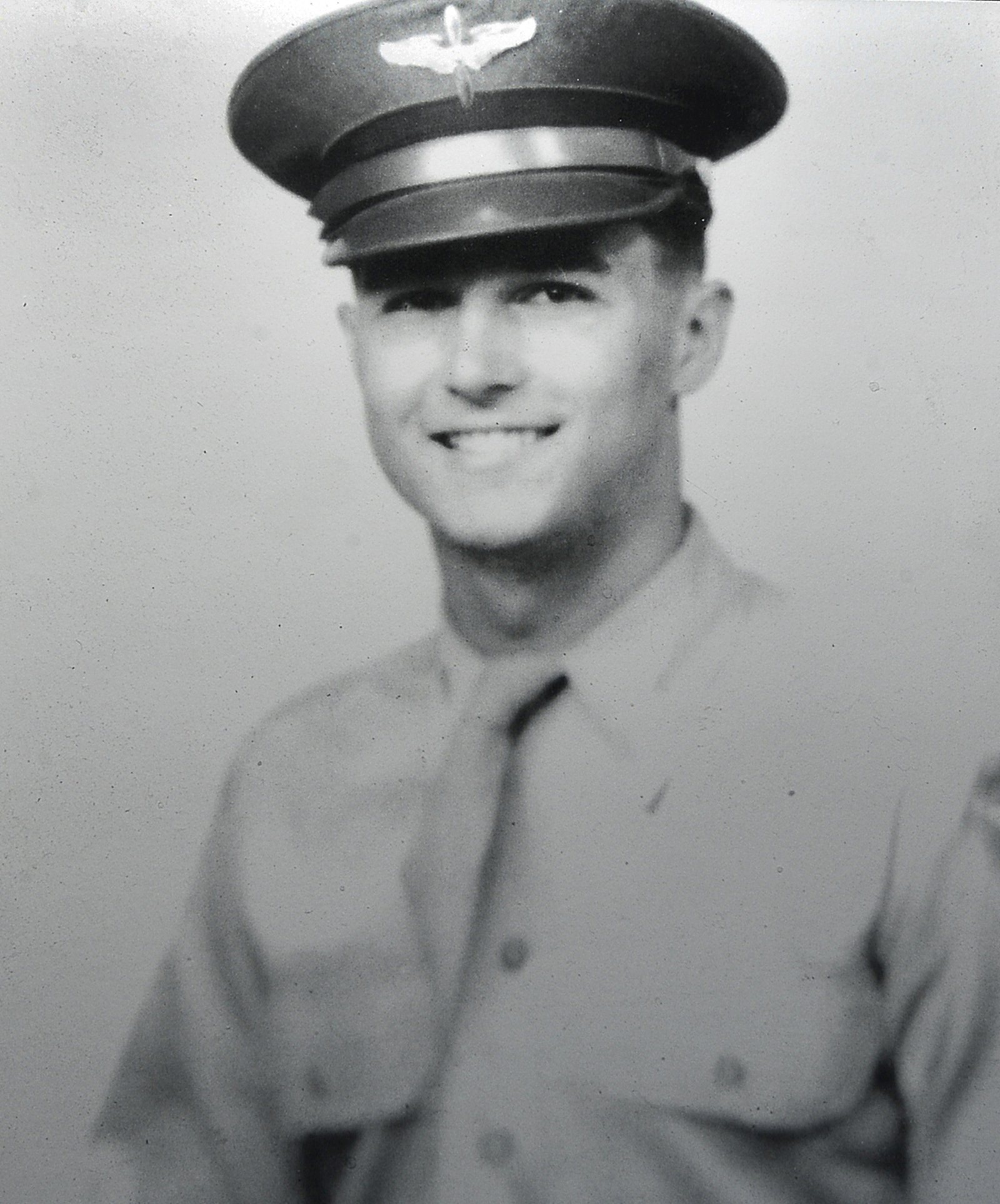
- Born: July 1, 1924; Portsmouth, Virginia, U.S.
- Died: December 7, 2012 (aged 88); New Braunfels, Texas, U.S.
- Burial place: Fort Sam Houston National Cemetery in San Antonio, Texas, U.S.
- Military career
- Allegiance: United States
- Branch: United States Army Air Forces; United States Air Force
- Service years: 1942–1976
- Rank: Colonel
- Units: 49th Fighter Group; 49th Fighter Bomber Wing; 4th Fighter Interceptor Wing; 12th Tactical Fighter Wing
- Commands: 4456th Combat Crew Training Squadron; 4455th Combat Crew Training Squadron; 12th Tactical Fighter Wing
- Conflicts: World War II; Korean War; Vietnam War; Battle of Khe Sanh
- Awards: Air Force Cross; Distinguished Service Cross; Silver Star; Legion of Merit (3); Distinguished Flying Cross (10); Bronze Star Medal; Meritorious Service Medal; Air Medal (41)

Colonel Ralph Sherman Parr, Jr. (July 1, 1924 – December 7, 2012) was an American double-flying ace of the Korean War. He was credited with a total of ten downed enemy aircraft. He also flew in World War II and the Vietnam War, and is the only person to have been awarded both the United States Army Distinguished Service Cross and the corresponding decoration used by the United States Air Force once it became an independent branch of service, the Air Force Cross.

== Early life ==
Parr was born in Portsmouth, Virginia, on July 1, 1924. His father, Ralph Sherman Parr, graduated from the United States Naval Academy in 1912 and became a naval aviator and squadron commander. On Parr's fifth birthday, his father took him flying, and his interest in flying grew from there. One of his brothers, Warren Sherman Parr, became a rear admiral in the United States Navy.

== Military career ==
=== World War II ===
Parr joined the Army Reserve as an enlisted man on November 4, 1942, and began aviation cadet training on February 2, 1943. A year later, on February 8, 1944, he graduated at Maxwell Field, Alabama, receiving both his wings and a second lieutenant's commission in the Army Air Forces. He spent the next seven months teaching other pilots at Blytheville, Arkansas, and in October 1944 he began converting to the P-38 Lightning, a course he completed in April 1945. After a few months of P-38 flying in California, he was posted in August 1945 to the 7th Fighter Squadron of the 49th Fighter Group. Based on Okinawa and later in Japan, he flew the P-38 and afterwards the P-51 Mustang with the squadron until July 1946. Other accounts say that he flew P-38s with the squadron in the Philippines in the last weeks of the war. On September 3, 1946, he left full-time service for the Air Force Reserve.

Parr returned to full-time service on February 9, 1948. For the next two and a half years, he flew with the 60th Fighter Squadron, first at Walker Air Force Base in New Mexico and later at Otis Air Force Base in Massachusetts, moving from the P-51 to the F-84 Thunderjet.

=== Korean War ===
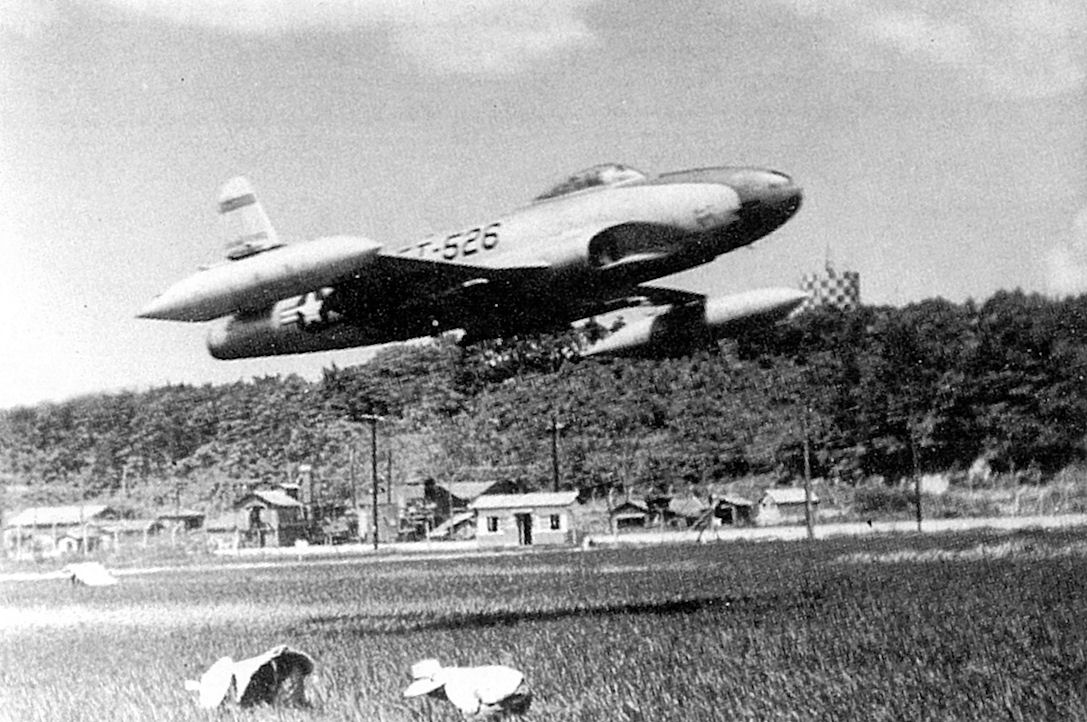
An F-80 Shooting Star of the 7th Fighter Squadron in Japan in August 1950

Parr volunteered for combat when the Korean War began in 1950. He began the war flying F-80 Shooting Stars with the 7th Fighter-Bomber Squadron of the 49th Fighter-Bomber Group at Furumaki Air Base in Japan, and he went with the squadron to Korea, where he stayed until May 1951. He flew 165 close-support and interdiction missions in the F-80. Back in the United States, he converted to the F-86 Sabre, flying it briefly in the summer of 1951 with the 116th Fighter-Interceptor Squadron at Geiger Field, Washington, and then for almost two years with the 94th Fighter-Interceptor Squadron at George Air Force Base, California. At George, he spent about a year developing tactics for fighting the MiG-15.

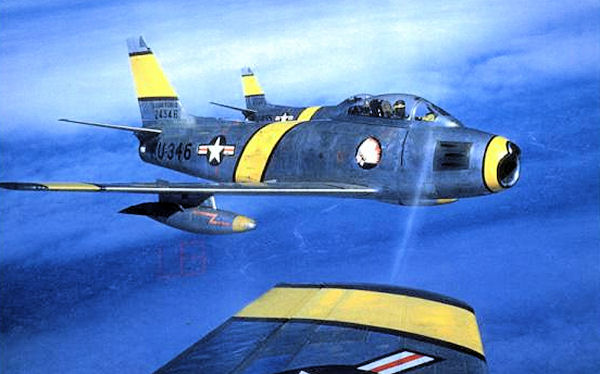
F-86 Sabre of the 335th Fighter Squadron over Korea

Parr went back to Korea in May 1953, now a captain, to join the 335th Fighter-Interceptor Squadron of the 4th Fighter-Interceptor Wing. He flew 47 missions in about seven weeks at the end of the war. As a newcomer to the squadron, he first flew as a wingman. On June 7, 1953, on his sixth sortie in the Sabre, he shot down two MiG-15s while flying as wingman to Second Lieutenant Al Cox. He also severely damaged a third MiG, although his gunsight was not working. He scored his third victory on June 10, and a double victory on June 18 made him an ace. On June 30, Parr and his wingman were attacked by ten MiG-15s. He shot down two of them, and he was maneuvering for a third when his wing commander, Colonel James K. Johnson, called for help. Johnson's Sabre had flamed out after it ingested debris from a MiG that he had shot down, and several MiGs were attacking him. Although he was low on fuel, Parr drove off the attackers, gave Johnson time to restart his engine and escorted him back to base. He received the Distinguished Service Cross for this action. He also received the Silver Star during his second tour. On July 12, he shot down a MiG from a four-aircraft formation for his ninth victory.

On July 27, 1953, the day the armistice was to take effect, Parr led one of three F-86F flights escorting a Marine photo-reconnaissance aircraft near the Yalu River. He spotted a transport aircraft flying close to the river, and he made two more passes to identify it. After checking that he was south of the Yalu, he shot it down, and his wingman, First Lieutenant Edwin J. Scarff, confirmed its markings. It was Parr's tenth victory and the last aerial victory of the Korean War. He later said of the transport, "I knew where it was and what it was. The only thing I didn't know was why it was there." The Far East Air Forces' intelligence summary for July 1953 noted that it was also the first Il-12 to be shot down in Korea.

According to Air Force Magazine, the Soviet Union claimed that the aircraft was a civilian airliner and that it had been shot down about 200 miles (320 km) to the north, over Manchuria, but an investigation found that its route from Port Arthur to Vladivostok crossed the Yalu where Parr had seen it. According to Soviet records cited by Moskovskij Komsomolets in 2023, the aircraft came down near the village of Maoershan in Jilin province, about 110 kilometres (68 mi) beyond the Yalu, and all 20 or 21 people aboard were killed, including its crew and officers, sergeants and doctors from the Soviet naval base at Port Arthur. The Soviet Union protested to the United States and sought nearly $2 million in compensation, but the United States rejected the claim and said that the aircraft had been shot down over Korea. Two days later, Soviet fighters shot down an American RB-50 reconnaissance aircraft near Vladivostok. According to the newspaper, attempts to pursue the Il-12 case through the International Court of Justice came to nothing.

=== Between the wars ===
Parr stayed in Korea after the armistice, flying with the 334th Fighter-Interceptor Squadron until February 1954. He then spent more than four years in air defense, flying the F-86D Sabre interceptor with the 4750th Air Defense Group at Vincent Air Force Base, Arizona, until July 1958. Staff work followed, first in operations at the 73rd Air Defense Division at Tyndall Air Force Base, Florida, and then, for three years from October 1959, with the Military Assistance Advisory Group in the Netherlands.

In September 1962, Parr arrived at MacDill Air Force Base, Florida, where he worked in operations at the headquarters of the 836th Air Division and then at the 4453rd Combat Crew Training Squadron. He was among the first instructors on the F-4 Phantom II. In January 1964, he took over the 4456th Combat Crew Training Squadron at MacDill, which he led until July. Moving to Davis–Monthan Air Force Base, Arizona, in August 1964, he was operations officer of the 4454th Combat Crew Training Squadron for several months, and in January 1965 he took command of the 4455th, a post he held until August 1966. He spent the following year as a student at the Air War College at Maxwell Air Force Base.

=== Vietnam War ===
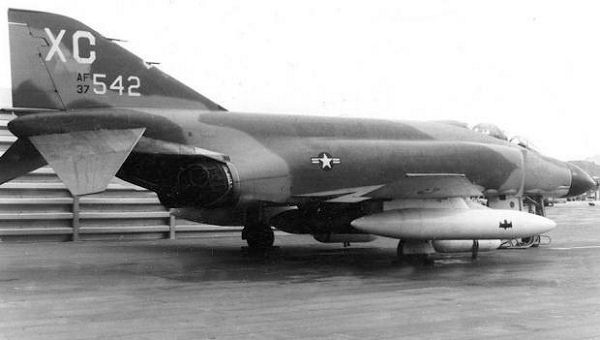
An F-4 Phantom of the 12th Tactical Fighter Wing at Cam Ranh Air Base in South Vietnam

Parr arrived at Cam Ranh Air Base in South Vietnam in September 1967 as deputy commander for operations of the 12th Tactical Fighter Wing, a post he held for almost a year, and he flew 226 combat missions in the F-4 on that tour. On March 16, 1968, during the siege of Khe Sanh, he and his weapon systems officer, Captain Thomas McManus, were flying one of two F-4s escorting C-130 transports that were resupplying the Marines. A forward air controller diverted them to two mortar positions within 70 metres (230 ft) of friendly forces, which they could attack only with napalm and only from one direction. Parr destroyed both positions in two low-level runs, but on the second run six heavy anti-aircraft weapons opened fire and severely damaged his aircraft.

Parr kept attacking until he had used all his ordnance, making two napalm runs and four cannon passes on the same restricted approach. He destroyed five of the guns and silenced the sixth, and the runway was then clear for the C-130s to leave. His F-4C was hit 27 times. The Marines described his bravery and skill as "the pinnacle of aerial professionalism". He received the Air Force Cross for the mission. According to The Washington Post, the Marine command at Khe Sanh nominated him for the Medal of Honor.

Between his two Vietnam tours, Parr worked on the staff of the Military Personnel Group at Randolph Air Force Base, Texas, from October 1968. In March 1970, he rejoined the 12th Tactical Fighter Wing at Phù Cát Air Base as its vice commander, and in October 1970 he took command of the wing, which he led until April 1971. He flew 201 more combat missions on his second tour. A member of his maintenance crew later recalled that he refused to remove three bright stripes from his aircraft, although they made him a visible target, because he wanted his pilots to know where he was.

=== Later career ===
Parr then spent 16 months on the headquarters staff of United States Air Forces in Europe at Lindsey Air Station in West Germany. In August 1972, he went to Iran, where he was chief of staff of the Military Assistance Advisory Group until January 1974. His last post, which he took up in January 1974, was director of operations at the Tactical Air Warfare Center at Eglin Air Force Base, Florida. A back injury, suffered when he climbed onto the roof of his home at Eglin to check it for hurricane damage, ended his career, and he was medically retired on October 17, 1976. He retired with more than 6,000 flying hours and more than 60 decorations.

== Later life ==
In 2001, Parr took part in a meeting with former Soviet pilots who had fought in the Korean War, and he said, "Pilots of both sides respect each other very much. There is no hostility between them." The Gathering of Eagles program honored him in 1988 and 2004. In retirement, he took part in nearly every major event of the 12th Flying Training Wing at Randolph Air Force Base. On December 5, 2008, the base's officers' club was renamed the Parr Club in his honor. A bronze bust of him stands in the club's lobby, and a chapter of the Red River Valley Fighter Pilots Association bears his name.

== Personal life and death ==
Parr was married to Margaret Parr, and he had three stepchildren and 12 grandchildren. He died on December 7, 2012, at the age of 88, at an assisted living facility in New Braunfels, Texas, after recently undergoing treatment for cancer. Nearly 300 people attended his memorial service at the Randolph theater on December 17, which included a missing man formation flyover by T-38 aircraft. He was buried at Fort Sam Houston National Cemetery in San Antonio.

== Awards and decorations ==
His personal awards are:

US Air Force Command Pilot Badge
| Air Force Cross | | Distinguished Service Cross |
| Silver Star | Legion of Merit w/ 2 bronze oak leaf clusters | Distinguished Flying Cross w/ Valor device, 1 silver and 2 bronze oak leaf clusters |
| Distinguished Flying Cross w/ 1 bronze oak leaf cluster (second ribbon required for accouterment spacing) | Bronze Star | Meritorious Service Medal |
| Air Medal w/ 4 silver oak leaf clusters | Air Medal w/ 3 silver and 1 bronze oak leaf clusters (second ribbon required for accouterment spacing) | Air Medal w/ 2 bronze oak leaf clusters (third ribbon required for accouterment spacing) |
| Air Force Commendation Medal | Army Commendation Medal | Air Force Presidential Unit Citation w/ 3 bronze oak leaf clusters |
| Air Force Outstanding Unit Award w/ Valor device, 1 silver and 1 bronze oak leaf clusters | Air Force Organizational Excellence Award; 1 bronze oak leaf cluster | Combat Readiness Medal |
| Army Good Conduct Medal | American Campaign Medal | Asiatic-Pacific Campaign Medal w/ 4 bronze campaign stars |
| World War II Victory Medal | Army of Occupation Medal w/ 'Japan' clasp | National Defense Service Medal w/ 1 bronze service star |
| Korean Service Medal w/ Arrowhead device, 1 silver and 1 bronze campaign stars | Armed Forces Expeditionary Medal w/ 1 bronze service star | Vietnam Service Medal w/ 1 silver and 1 bronze campaign stars |
| Air Force Longevity Service Award w/ 1 silver and 1 bronze oak leaf clusters | Armed Forces Reserve Medal | Small Arms Expert Marksmanship Ribbon |
| Philippine Liberation Medal w/ 2 bronze service stars | Philippine Independence Medal | Vietnam Gallantry Cross w/ Bronze Star |
| Vietnam Armed Forces Honor Medal; 1st Class | Republic of Korea Presidential Unit Citation | Republic of Vietnam Gallantry Cross |
| United Nations Korea Medal | Vietnam Campaign Medal | Korean War Service Medal |

=== Air Force Cross citation ===

Parr, Ralph Sherman
Colonel, U.S. Air Force
12th Tactical Fighter Wing, Cam Ranh Bay Air Base, Vietnam
Date of Action: March 16, 1968

Citation:

The President of the United States of America, authorized by Title 10, Section 8742, United States Code, takes pleasure in presenting the Air Force Cross to Colonel Ralph Sherman Par, United States Air Force, for extraordinary heroism in military operations against an opposing force as an F-4C Phantom Aircraft Commander and Commanding Officer of the 12th Tactical Fighter Wing, Cam Ranh Bay Air Base, Vietnam, in action near Khe Sanh, Republic of Vietnam, on 16 March 1968. On that date, Colonel Parr participated in a flight providing cover for cargo aircraft. Upon arrival over the target, the forward air controller advised the flight that the airfield was under heavy attack by hostile mortar positions, which were located a few feet below a ridge line. Although the target area was covered with dense smoke and haze, Colonel Parr successfully destroyed one mortar position on his first pass, as six well-camouflaged heavy automatic weapons opened fire on him. Although sustaining severe damage to his aircraft, he pressed his second attack and destroyed another mortar position. Again, completely disregarding his personal safety and the withering hostile gun fire, Colonel Parr succeeded in destroying six heavy caliber automatic weapons positions. In between passes, his accurate and timely directions to his wingman effectively insured the accuracy of ordnance delivery in close proximity to the friendly forces. Only after delivering all of his ordnance at point-blank range in eight consecutive passes did Colonel Parr terminate his attack. By destroying these strategically located weapons, he not only impaired the hostile force's capability to impede the resupply of Khe Sanh, but also reduced further losses to friendly cargo aircraft and crews. Through his superb airmanship, aggressiveness, and extraordinary heroism, Colonel Parr reflected the highest credit upon himself and the United States Air Force.

=== Distinguished Service Cross citation ===
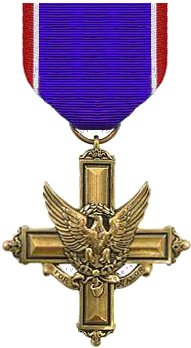

Parr, Ralph Sherman
Captain, U.S. Air Force
334th Fighter Interceptor Squadron, 4th Fighter Interceptor Wing, 5th Air Force
Date of Action: June 30, 1953

Citation:

"The President of the United States of America, under the provisions of the Act of Congress approved July 9, 1918, takes in presenting the Distinguished Service Cross (Air Force) to Captain Ralph Sherman Parr, United States Air Force, for extraordinary heroism in connection with military operations against an armed enemy of the United Nations while serving as Pilot of an F-86 type aircraft of the 334th Fighter-Interceptor Squadron, 4th Fighter-Interceptor Wing, Fifth Air Force, in action against enemy forces in the Republic of Korea on 30 June 1953. On that date, while leading a formation of two F-86 type aircraft on a combat air patrol deep in enemy territory, Captain Parr was attacked by a formation of ten enemy MIGs. Exhibiting superb airmanship and extraordinary gallantry, Captain Parr positioned himself on the attackers. Despite the imminent threat from the hail of cannon fire from behind, Captain Parr selected his target, and with a long burst from his guns, destroyed one of the enemy MIGs. Against superior numbers of enemy aircraft, Captain Parr, although under a continual hail of enemy cannon fire, and with complete disregard for his personal safety, again valiantly counter-attacked another of the threatening aircraft. Utilizing extraordinary flying skill, Captain Parr tenaciously followed the enemy through a series of violent, evasive maneuvers until he gained the advantage and scored multiple hits on the MiG, causing it to burst into flame. While turning to move to surprise another of the enemy aircraft, Captain Parr broke off his attack to answer a call of distress from a friendly aircraft. Although dangerously low on fuel, Captain Parr, at great risk to his life, provided aggressive and determined protection for the distressed friendly aircraft, escorting it safely back to base. Captain Parr's keen flying skill in turning the tide of battle despite overwhelming odds and his high personal courage in protecting a fellow pilot evidenced conspicuous gallantry in action, and reflected great credit upon himself, the Far East Air Forces and the United States Air Force."

== See also ==
- List of Korean War flying aces
