= Resort Airlines Flight 1081 =

1953 aviation accident

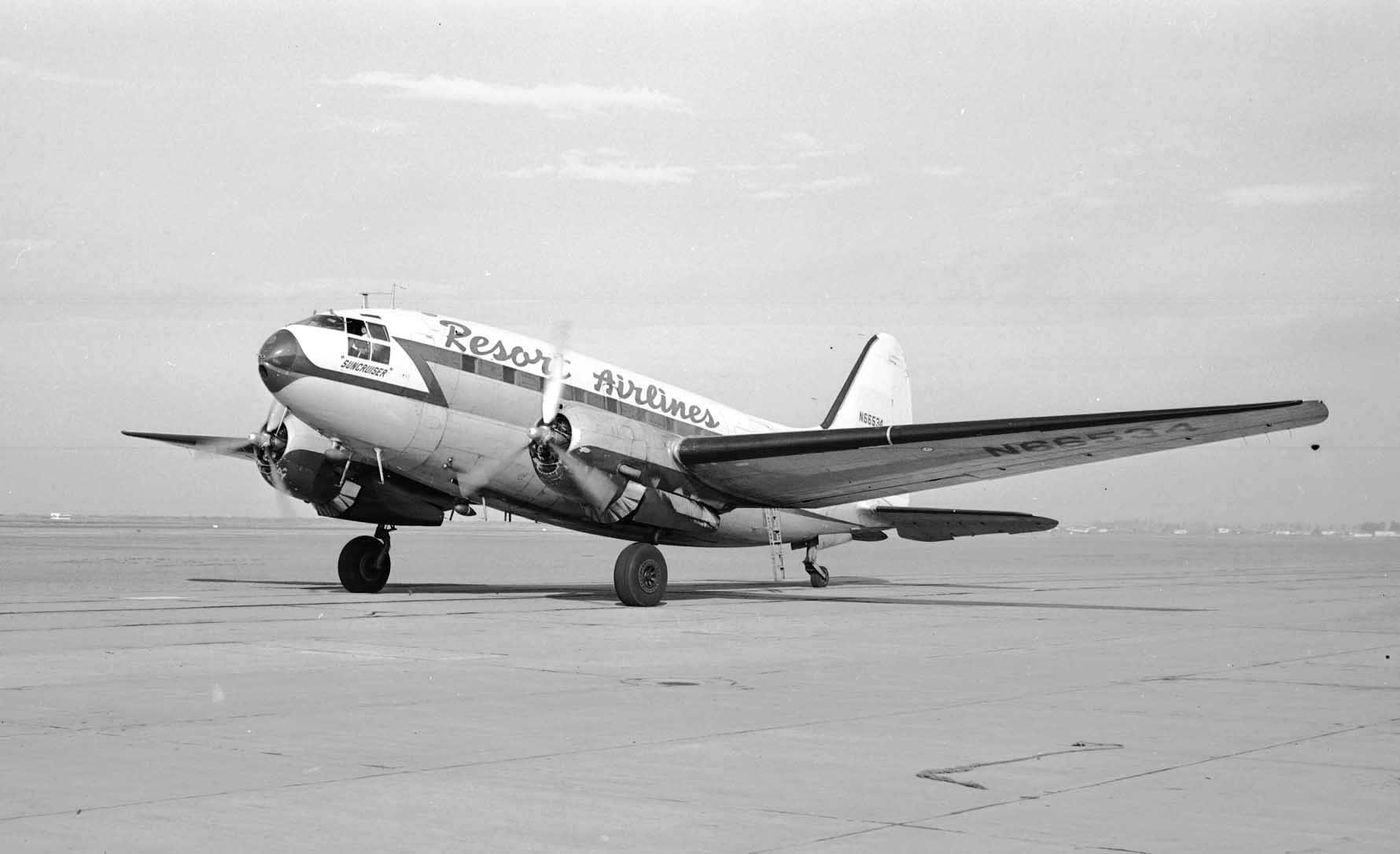
- N66534, the aircraft involved in the accident, photographed in 1952

Accident
- Date: September 28, 1953
- Summary: Structural failure of left elevator causing loss of control
- Site: Louisville-Standiford Field, Louisville, Kentucky, United States

Aircraft
- Aircraft type: Curtiss C-46F-1-CU Commando
- Operator: Resort Airlines
- Registration: N66534
- Flight origin: North Philadelphia Airport, Pennsylvania
- Destination: Louisville-Standiford Field, Kentucky
- Occupants: 41
- Passengers: 38
- Crew: 3
- Fatalities: 25
- Survivors: 16

Resort Airlines Flight 1081 was a charter flight operated by Resort Airlines that crashed during landing at Louisville-Standiford Field, Kentucky, on September 28, 1953. The Curtiss C-46F-1-CU Commando, registration N66534, was operating from North Philadelphia Airport to Louisville when it stalled during approach and struck the ground. Of the 41 passengers and crew on board, 25 were killed.

== Aircraft ==
The aircraft was a Curtiss C-46 F-1-CU Commando, manufacturer serial number 22384, built in 1945 and registered N66534. It was powered by Pratt & Whitney R-2800-75 engines. At the time of the accident, the aircraft had accumulated 6,952 total airframe hours.

== Passengers and crew ==
The flight carried 38 passengers and three crew members, totaling 41 occupants. The plane was carrying American soldiers arriving from Korea.

There were 25 fatalities, including all three crew members and 16 passengers were seriously injured.

The crew consisted of Captain W. E. Moller, First Officer J. D. Pickel, and Stewardess D. J. Bush.

== Accident ==
At 16:18 on September 28, 1953, the aircraft crashed during landing at its destination, Standiford Airport, Louisville, Kentucky. The flight had departed North Philadelphia Airport at 13:03 on a Visual Flight Rules flight plan. The trip between North Philadelphia and Louisville was normal and in good weather.

As the aircraft approached Runway 24, it ballooned slightly during the flare-out. Power was applied and the aircraft entered a steep climb. The angle of attack continued to increase until the aircraft stalled at an altitude of about 300 feet. The aircraft then struck the ground nose-first and on the left wing. The fuselage burst open upon impact. The plane caught fire.

Witnesses observed that a portion of the left elevator was hanging down during the climb. The aircraft continued in a steep climbing left turn until it stalled and fell to the ground. There was no organized evacuation due to the severity of the impact and damage. Emergency equipment transported survivors to nearby hospitals.

Initial reports reported 21 to 22 deaths, including the pilot and co-pilot, with the other 21 people being injured. A day after the disaster the death toll was 23 people, with still eight seriously injured in hospital.

Ultimately according to the official numbers, sixteen passengers were injured and 25 occupants, including all three crew members, were killed. The aircraft was destroyed.

== Investigation ==
The accident was investigated by the Civil Aeronautics Board (CAB). Examination of the wreckage showed that the No. 1 hinge bolt in the left elevator had worked free from the hinge fitting, leaving the outboard third of the elevator unsupported. The bolt was found to be a nonapproved type and showed severe wear. Laboratory examination revealed that bushings in the hinge bracket did not meet required specifications.

The Board determined that the probable cause of the accident was structural failure of the left elevator in flight, causing loss of control. The structural failure was brought about by the left outboard hinge bolt backing out of the assembly. The underlying cause was improper maintenance, including installation of hinge bolts and bearings not meeting specifications and inadequate inspection which failed to detect the condition.
