= Aer Lualdi L.55 =

L.55

General information
- Type: Light helicopter
- National origin: Italy
- Manufacturer: Aer Lualdi
- Designer: Carlo Lualdi
- Number built: 1

The Aer Lualdi L.55 was a prototype Italian helicopter, a development of the Lualdi-Tassotti ES 53 featuring a far more powerful 134 kW (180 hp) Lycoming O-360. While the ES 53 had been purely experimental, the L.55 was Lualdi's first step towards a marketable aircraft.

== Specifications (L.55) ==
Data from Jane's All the World's Aircraft 1958-59

General characteristics

- Crew: 1
- Capacity: 3 pax
- Length: 11 m (36 ft 1 in)
- Height: 2.9 m (9 ft 6 in)
- Empty weight: 600 kg (1,323 lb)
- Gross weight: 1,000 kg (2,205 lb)
- Fuel capacity: 140 L (37.0 US gal; 30.8 imp gal) with provision for a 27 L (7.1 US gal; 5.9 imp gal) auxiliary
- Powerplant: 1 × Lycoming O-360 4-cylinder air-cooled horizontally-opposed piston engine, 130 kW (180 hp) with cooling fan
- Main rotor diameter: 10 m (32 ft 10 in)
- Main rotor area: 355.4 m^{2} (3,825 sq ft)
- Blade section: - root: NACA 0015; tip: NACA 0012

Performance

- Maximum speed: 155 km/h (96 mph, 84 kn)
- Cruise speed: 129 km/h (80 mph, 70 kn) at 75% power
- Range: 350 km (220 mi, 190 nmi)
- Endurance: 3 hours
- Service ceiling: 4,000 m (13,000 ft) absolute
- Hover ceiling IGE: 2,800 m (9,186 ft)
- Rate of climb: 5 m/s (980 ft/min) at sea level
- Disk loading: 9.75 kg/m^{2} (2.00 lb/sq ft)
