= Resort Airlines =

Unusual US scheduled airline 1945–1960

IATA	ICAO	Call sign
RA^{(1)}	RA^{(1)}	—
- Founded: 11 September 1945 incorporated in North Carolina
- Commenced operations: 1945
- Ceased operations: 30 June 1960
- Operating bases: Pinehurst, North Carolina; New York, New York; Miami, Florida
- Fleet size: See Fleet
- Destinations: See Destinations
- Parent company: Fiduciary Counsel, Inc. from 1950
- Headquarters: Pinehurst, North Carolina; Miami, Florida; Washington, DC; United States
- Key people: Clinton Davidson
- Founder: Lewis C. Burwell, Jr.

Notes
- (1) IATA, ICAO codes were the same until the 1980s

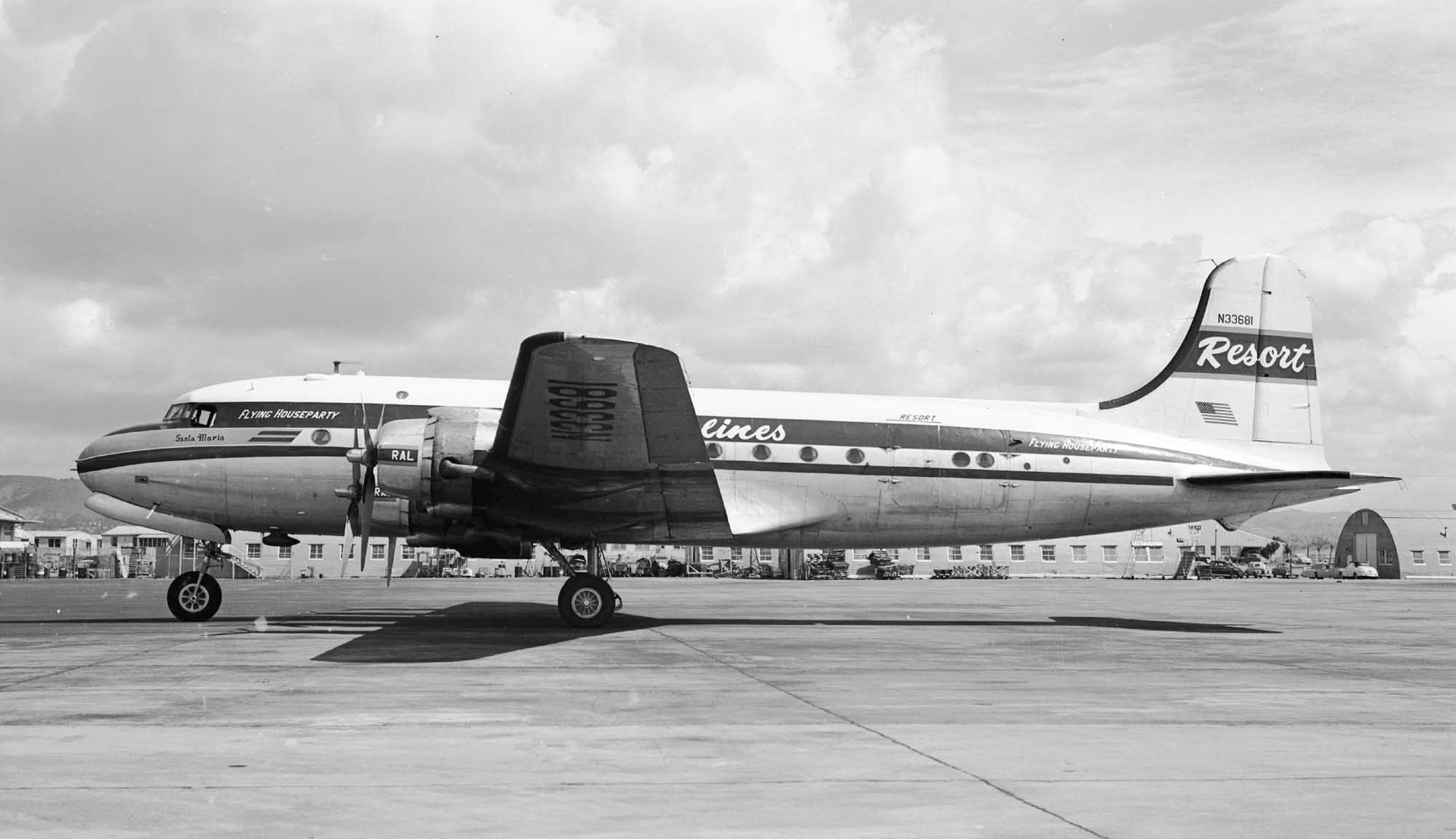
DC-4 at Oakland 1954. Note "Flying Houseparty" behind cockpit

Resort Airlines was an unusual United States scheduled international airline certificated in 1949 by the Civil Aeronautics Board (CAB), the now-defunct Federal agency that, at the time, tightly regulated almost all commercial air transport in the United States. Resort's scheduled authority was restricted to offering all-expenses paid escorted tours to nearby foreign destinations (e.g. the Caribbean), known as sky cruises. Resort could offer conventional charter service but no other scheduled service. The market for sky cruises was limited and quite unprofitable, so the vast majority of Resort's business was charters, and for several years, only charters. At the time, the US did not have pure charter carriers, but rather supplemental air carriers (known, until 1955, as irregular air carriers), which at the time had a limited ability to offer scheduled service. Since Resort was functionally a pure charter carrier, it had in some ways the most restrictive certificate in the US airline industry. The airline ceased operations in 1960 at which time it tried selling its certificate to Trans Caribbean Airways. But in 1961 the CAB rejected the deal and revoked the moribund carrier's certificate.

Resort is sometimes referred to as supplemental or irregular air carrier. It was briefly an irregular air carrier before CAB certification, but from 1949 onward the CAB regulated it as a scheduled carrier, albeit an unusual one. The term "supplemental" came into existence in 1955, Resort was thus never a supplemental.

== History ==
=== Early years ===
Resort was incorporated 11 September 1945 by Lewis C. Burwell Jr., a former U.S. Army Air Force Lieutenant Colonel, as a North Carolina corporation headquartered in Pinehurst originally focused on owning airports. By November, Resort had purchased Knollwood Army Airfield in Pinehurst, renaming it Pinehurst-Southern Pines Airport. By December, Resort was offering flights on light aircraft to the public. By June 1946 Resort was offering service from New York to Miami but also experimenting with sky cruises. For instance, it offered a 16-day tour across the United States and back from New York City, all expenses paid, including 12 stops, for $785 (over $12,500 in 2024 dollars) on a 20-seat Douglas DC-3.

By November 1946 Resort had applied to the CAB for authority to offer such sky cruises from Northern US cities to the Caribbean and Latin America. While the CAB deliberated, Resort continued to offer sky cruises under a CAB exemption. The CAB rejected the application, but since it involved foreign travel, under the law at the time, the US president had the final say and President Harry S. Truman liked the idea, seeing it as a good for US foreign policy. He overruled the CAB and Resort's application was approved in June 1949 to offer sky cruises to points in Canada, the Caribbean, Central and northern South America and Mexico for a five-year term. However, the CAB had the last word on a parallel application to offer sky cruises domestically, and rejected it. The scheduled certificate superseded Resort's "letter of registration", received from the CAB in 1947, what CAB provided irregular air carriers in lieu of a certificate.

=== Scheduled airline ===
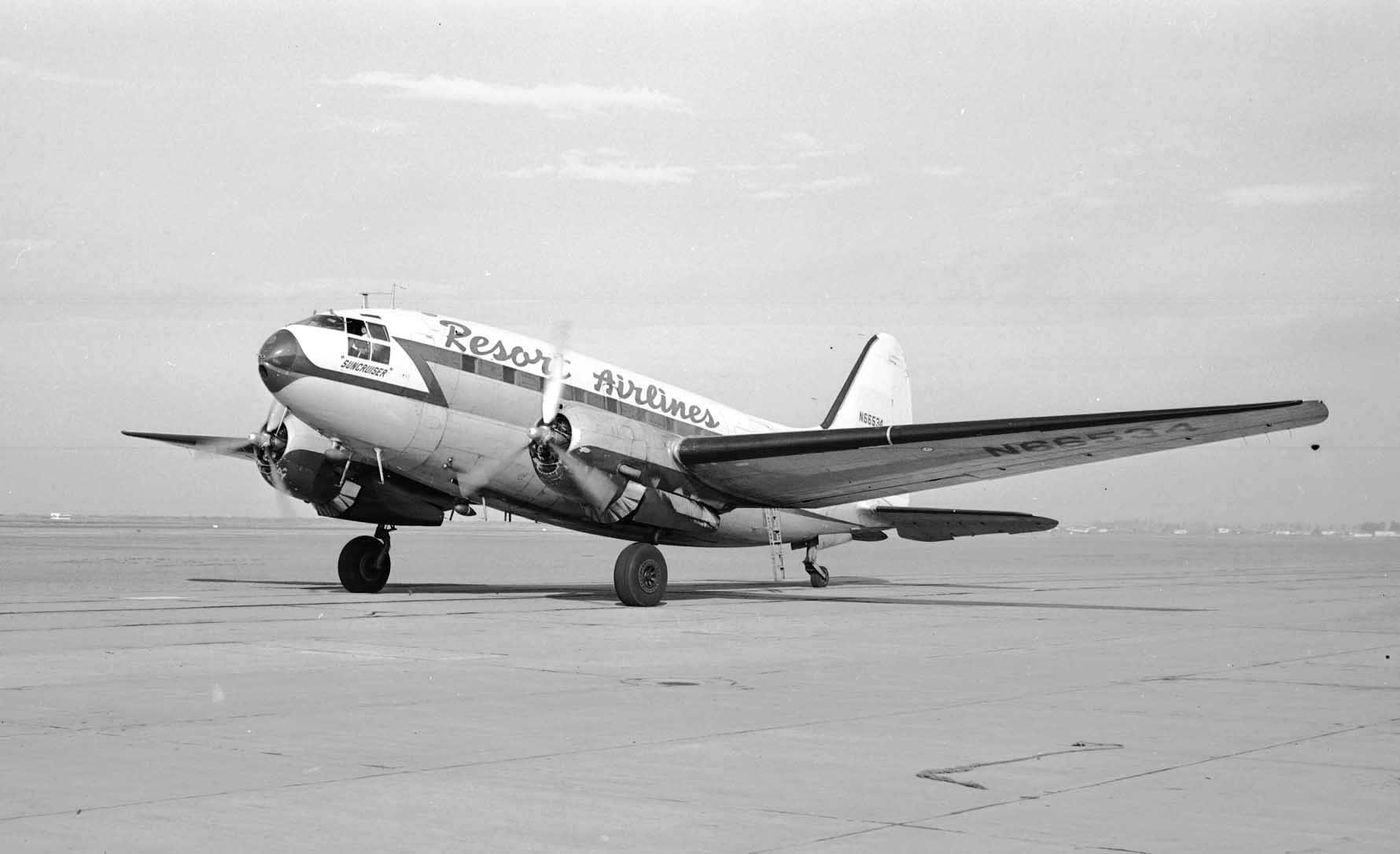
C-46 at Oakland July 1952. This aircraft, N66534, crashed 14 months later at Louisville, Kentucky with the deaths of 25 on board. See Accidents

Resort received its scheduled certificate in August 1949, but sky cruising did not start until 1951. In September 1950, ownership and management changed, with the company becoming controlled by Fiduciary Counsel, Inc., a fund manager controlled by Clinton Davidson. In 1951 the CAB launched an investigation into Resort's activities. Competitors challenged whether Resort could offer charters and any other kind of scheduled service. The answer, handed down in 1952, was yes to charters, no to scheduled service outside of sky cruising. At the time, irregular carriers (Resort's status before it was certificated) had substantial flexibility to offer charters and a certain, ill-defined amount of "individually ticketed" (i.e. scheduled) service, so long as it was "irregular" (standardized to 10 flights per month in any city pair in 1955). Resort lost this flexibility by becoming a scheduled carrier. On the operational side, the CAB (and its operational alter-ego, the Civil Aeronautics Administration, predecessor to the Federal Aviation Administration) allowed Resort to continue to follow operational regulations that applied to irregular (and later supplemental) carriers rather than those that the scheduled carriers needed to follow.

==== Flying houseparty ====
Meanwhile, sky cruising, under a scheduled certificate, was deeply unprofitable. Resort calculated that from 1951 through September 1955, it had total sky cruise-related revenue of $0.95 million, on which it had an operating loss of $1.68 million, or an operating margin of -176%. Some of the issues included obtaining foreign operating rights. Just because the CAB gave Resort the right to fly didn't mean the foreign governments would. Resort went through several management changes and in 1954 changed its operating base from New York to Miami (through which all flights transited), flew all sky cruise business with four-engine aircraft (see Fleet) and recommitted to the sky cruise business. 1954 results were the worst yet and Resort ended sky cruising in August 1955. Nonetheless, Resort requested renewal of its certificate, which the CAB granted for another five years in April 1957, including reducing the required number of overseas stops to permit shorter trips.

Resort billed its tours as a "flying houseparty" (see picture, above). Passengers were introduced to each other at the start, a guide accompanied them taking care of all details, everything (all meals, entertainment, excursions) included in the price other than laundry and personal shopping. A typical tour was two weeks, but could be as short as three days or as long as three weeks. The guide stayed with the party, the plane moved on, with another plane arriving later to pick up passengers to the next stop. External links has a video of a Resort Airlines travelogue of the concept from 1952.

Resort Airlines financial results, 1951–1960
USD 000	1951	1952	1953	1954	1955	1956	1957	1958	1959	1960
Scheduled revenue	32	167	301	321	84	0	0	0	27	0
Charter and other rev	4,306	3,271	3,392	3,230	4,733	5,868	7,577	6,342	5,629	2,464
Total op revenue	4,338	3,438	3,693	3,550	4,817	5,868	7,577	6,342	5,656	2,464
Op profit (loss)	597	(583)	(1,090)	(1,277)	(805)	578	823	739	330	4
Op margin (%)	13.8	-17.0	-29.5	-36.0	-16.7	9.9	10.9	11.7	5.8	0.2

==== Successful charter business ====
For its entire time as a scheduled carrier, charters were by far the bulk, and in later years, often the sole source of Resort's revenue. In the early years, charters comprised military passenger and migrant farm labor movements from the Caribbean to the US Midwest. In 1954, Resort obtained both a portion of the Navy's Quicktrans domestic cargo program (for which it flew five C-46s) and a portion of the Air Force's Quicktrans equivalent, the Logair domestic cargo program, for which it flew DC-4s. Resort would remain a Logair contractor until 1960. For instance, in 1956 Resort obtained the largest portion of the Logair contract, worth $5 million for the government's fiscal year, flying eight DC-4 freighters (the other three contractors splitting 33 C-46s between them). As the financial record shows, Resort was, in fact, successful in the charter business in its later years. In 1958, Resort referred to itself as the country's largest contract carrier of military air freight.

=== Demise ===
Resort petitioned the CAB for a suspension of service in June 1960, stating that Cuba (now post-Cuban Revolution), Jamaica and the Bahamas were refusing it landing rights. The CAB noted the tiny amount of scheduled service since the 1957 certificate renewal raised questions about the viability of Resort's certificate and ordered it to resume scheduled service within 90 days or risk losing certification. Suspension coincided with:

- Resort's loss of the Logair contract, which Aviation Week noted would result in a "drastic revenue cutback" and
- An agreement by Trans Caribbean Airways (TCA) to purchase Resort's certificate for stock valued at about $175,000 (over $1.8 million in 2024 dollars). The CAB noted no physical assets were to be transferred, nor liabilities, nor even the Resort name, but simply Resort's legal authorities.

Under the terms of its 1957 certificate renewal, Resort was required to start scheduled service again within a year. It failed to do that, got a one-year extension from the CAB, tried "token" sky cruise service in 1959 transporting a total of 159 passengers, then operated under a series of temporary extensions with the CAB until the suspension discussed above. The CAB noted that since June 30, 1960 Resort's main source of revenue was leasing three DC-4s to World Airways, one of the 1960 Logair winners, with a dozen or two people at the office "keeping house."

TCA proposed running Resort business on TCA's DC-6 aircraft, with a divider between people on tour and those flying conventionally. Resort had always maintained that it was generating new business, not diverting passengers from scheduled carriers. The CAB saw TCA's proposal as undercutting this rationale, but also possibly advantaging TCA in terms of its ability to leverage the Resort certificate authority to expand TCA's conventional business. Further, the CAB noted Resort had a good balance sheet and its refusal to continue the scheduled business reflected a fundamental lack of faith in the business model. On 31 August 1961 the CAB rejected the merger and revoked Resort's certificate, which became effective 10 October 1961. However, Resort reported no transportation revenue after 30 June 1960, the day its Logair contract ended (the US govt fiscal year then ending June 30), allowing the inference that Resort's last day of operations was 30 June 1960.

== Legacy ==
Resort is sometimes referred to as a supplemental air carrier or similar in historical material, including in some of high quality such as the Ed Coates historic aircraft photo collection, Yesterday's Airlines and the World Airline Historical Society. However, Resort Airlines was a scheduled carrier for all but four years of its existence. Further, since the CAB only coined the term "supplemental" in 1955, Resort was never a supplemental.

== Fleet ==
November 1946:

- 4 Douglas DC-3
- 2 Douglas DC-4

May 1953:

- 14 Curtiss C-46

March 1959:

- 9 Douglas DC-4

At one time, Resort also controlled two Lockheed L-1049H Super Constellations, but it's not clear how often the airline operated them. In 1957 the CAB approved a lease to Hughes Tool Company (then parent of Trans World Airlines) for these aircraft. See External links for photos of these aircraft in Resort livery.

== Destinations ==
As of June 1953, the following were tour originating points:

- Chicago, Illinois
- Cleveland, Ohio
- Detroit, Michigan
- Miami, Florida
- New York City
- Philadelphia, Pennsylvania
- Pittsburgh, Pennsylvania
- Washington, DC

The following were tour destinations:

- Guatemala City, Guatemala
- Havana, Cuba
- Merida, Mexico
- Montego Bay, Jamaica
- Nassau, Bahamas
- Port Au Prince, Haiti

== Accidents ==
- 22 May 1953: A Curtiss C-46F (N1669M) flying a ferry flight between Cheyenne, Wyoming and Chicago was flying through a thunderstorm when a component of the right wing aileron tab motor detached, causing detachment of the right aileron, lack of control and detachment of the right wing. The two pilots died.
- 28 September 1953: Flight 1081, operated by a Curtiss C-46F (N66534), experienced a left elevator failure on landing at Louisville on a military charter flight from North Philadelphia causing the aircraft to veer out of control and stall from several hundred feet. It was found that the left elevator hinge bolts and other hardware were unapproved. Further, there was no paperwork evidencing the left elevator at the last maintenance. The cause of the accident was improper maintenance and inspection. The three crew (including two pilots and one flight attendant) died, as well as 22 passengers. Another 16 passengers were seriously injured.

== See also ==
- Logair
- Quicktrans
- List of defunct airlines of the United States
