= Campoformido =

Campoformido Cjampfuarmit (Friulian)
- Comune
- Comune di Campoformido
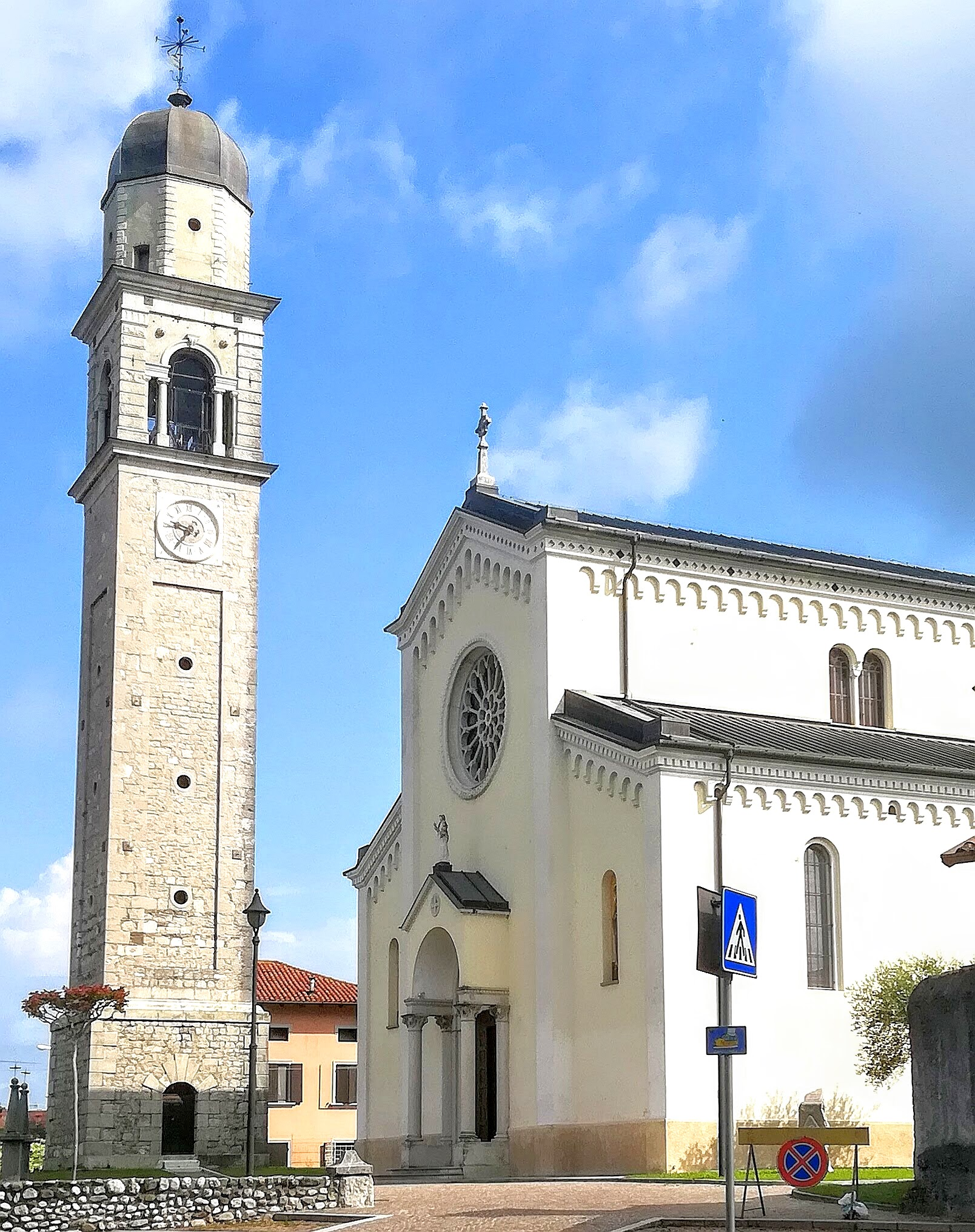
- Church of Santa Maria della Purificazione in Campoformido

- Location within Italy Location within Friuli-Venezia Giulia
- Coordinates: 46°1′N 13°10′E
- Country: Italy
- Region: Friuli-Venezia Giulia
- Province: Udine (UD)
- Frazioni: Basaldella, Bressa, Villa Primavera

Government
  - Mayor: Erika Furlani

Area
  - Total: 21.98 km^{2} (8.49 sq mi)
- Elevation: 78 m (256 ft)

Population (31 December 2019)
  - Total: 7,743
  - Density: 352.3/km^{2} (912.4/sq mi)
- Demonym: Compoformidesi
- Time zone: UTC+1 (CET)
  - Summer (DST): UTC+2 (CEST)
- Postal code: 33030
- Dialing code: 0432
- Website: Official website

Campoformido (Italian: [ˌkampoˈfɔrmido]; archaically Campoformio; Friulian: Cjampfuarmit) is a town and comune (municipality) in the Regional decentralization entity of Udine in Friuli-Venezia Giulia, northeastern Italy, with a population of 7,743 (December 2019). It is notable for the 1797 Treaty of Campo Formio.

== History ==
Campoformido is a village not far from Udine. It is known for the 1797 Treaty of Campo Formio signed between Napoleonic France and Austria, in which Napoleon ceded Veneto to Austria in exchange for Lombardy. The treaty enacted the dissolution of the Republic of Venice.

The treaty was signed by General Bonaparte and four representatives of the Habsburgs at the house of Bertrando Del Torre, a merchant, located in what is now the Trattato (Treaty) square. The house is open to visitors. To commemorate the event, two monuments, one placed outside the house and one inside, remained covered with lime for a long time after the fall of Napoleon. There is also, in the same square, a copy of the Statue of Peace; the original was brought to Udine and is located in Piazza della Libertà.
