= Aviación del Litoral Fluvial Argentino =

The airline Aviación del Litoral Fluvial Argentino or A.L.F.A. was a joint venture established on May 16, 1946, by the Argentine government, through national decree 13.532, and the merger of "Corporación Sudamericana de Servicios Aéreos S.A." (CSSA) and "Compañía Argentina de Aeronavegación Dodero S.A." (CAAD). The airline flew to the Argentine coast, as well as reaching Asunción, Paraguay and Montevideo, operating with Short Sandringham and Sunderland flying boats. In May 1949 it merged with other companies existing at the time, FAMA, ZONDA, and Aeroposta, to create Aerolíneas Argentinas.

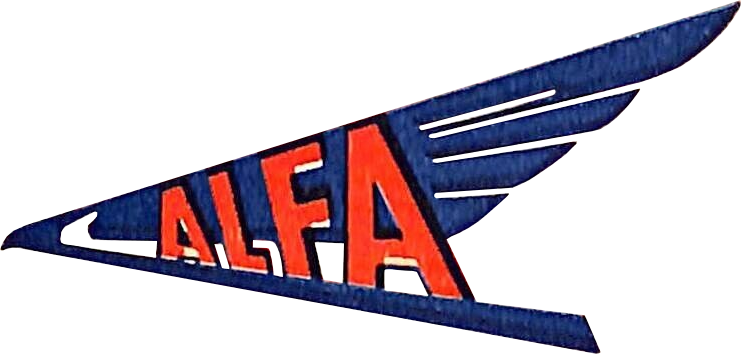
Logo

== Background ==
The routes operated by ALFA had previously been flown by the following companies:

- "Compañía Franco Argentina de Transportes Aéreos", formed as a result of the French Aviation Mission headed by the commander Precardin and Almandos Almonacid during November 1919 and February 1920 establishing the first public air service between Buenos Aires and Montevideo for experimental purposes and then discontinued .
- "River Plate Aviation Co." which began operations on May 23, 1920, from an aerodrome located in what is now the Hippodrome of San Isidro.
- "Compañía Rioplatense de Aviación SA", (Rioplatense Aviation Company SA), born on September 21, 1921, by the merger of the two prior-operating companies, inaugurating the first regular air transport between Buenos Aires, Argentina and Montevideo.
- "Aeroposta Argentina S.A." Incorporated on September 5, 1927, Aeroposta began its regular services on January 1, 1929, from the aerodrome at General Pacheco, Buenos Aires to Asunción, Paraguay via Monte Caseros, Corrientes, with two Laté 25 aircraft, piloted by Paul French and Argentinians Pedro Vachet Ficarelli and Leonardo Selvetti.
- "NYRBA Line", controlled by the U.S. company "Trimotor Safety Air-ways" started its flights to Montevideo in 1929, connecting New York to Rio de Janeiro and Buenos Aires, later taken over by Pan American Airways, in 1930.
- "Pan American World Airways", since 1938 operated the route Buenos Aires, Monte Caseros, Asunción (Paraguay), until their license to operate domestic flights in Argentina was revoked in 1946.
- "Syndicato Cóndor" (Condor Syndicate), a subsidiary of Deutsche Luft Hansa based in Brazil, in 1934 began flights between Argentina and Germany, with stops in Montevideo (Uruguay) and Rio de Janeiro (Brazil), until in 1943 the airline changed its name to Cruzeiro do Sul.
- "Compañía Aeronáutica Uruguaya S.A." (CAUSA) began services between Buenos Aires and Montevideo on March 12, 1938, with two Junkers Ju 52 trimotors equipped with floats.
- "Corporación Sudamericana de Servicios Aéreos", (South American Air Service Corporation), formed with Italian capital, began operations in mid-1938, bound for Montevideo (Uruguay) and in 1939 to Asunción (Paraguay) with intermediate stops in Rosario, Santa Fe, Barranqueras and Formosa.
- "Sociedad Argentina de Navegación Aérea" (SANA). (Argentina Air Navigation Society). Founded in August 1939, the airline began service between the port of Buenos Aires and Colonia in Uruguay, to connect from there, via a bus service to Montevideo.
- "Línea Aérea Nordeste" (LANE). (North East Airline). In 1943 began operating services covering Monte Caseros (Corrientes), Resistencia (Chaco), and Puerto Iguazú (Misiones), the company, along with "LASO" would form LADE.

== History ==
From October 1945 and the possibility of being part of a joint venture with the National State, the shipping company Compania Argentina Dodero Navigacion [1] presents a major project for the exploitation of commercial air routes on the rivers Paraná and Uruguay, and international flights from other regions to Uruguay, Paraguay, Brazil, Europe and the U.S..

This company had already expressed this intention to buy a Consolidated 16 Commodore seaplanes, registration LV-AAL, which had belonged to the Sociedad Argentina de Navigation (SANA), when it ceased operations in late 1943.

Compañía Argentina de Navegación Dodero SA (Argentine Navigation Company Dodero SA) established its administrative, commercial and operational and gave the necessary personnel to operate it. For the provision of international services was the Compania Argentina de Navigation Dodero SA. [2]

With the idea that if the flight equipment acquired by the National Government would grant the appropriate permissions, five Short Sandringham in the United Kingdom and United States based on the company "South American Trading Corporation, which eventually acquired and transferred to ALFA four Douglas DC-3s, six UC-64A Norseman and two Beech C-45 Expeditors.

In parallel, the Corporación Sudamericana de Servicios Aéreos (South American Air Service Corporation), which also sought to become a joint venture with the National, the company operated in conjunction Uruguayan CAUSA were acquired in a simultaneous operation with two Short Sunderland in the UK, accounting for the first LV-ASA registered. Both companies made intensive efforts to obtain necessary approvals to operate, eventually the February 22, 1946, the Corporation Sudamericana SA Air Services and the Department of Aeronautics signed the charter of a joint enterprise.

The Navigation Company Dodero Argentina SA, which had already received part of the flight equipment was purchased and performing the necessary infrastructure to operate them, decide to buy the controlling stake in South American Air Service Corporation SA and the establishment of the joint enterprise by this company and the State on 17 April 1946. A month later, on May 16, 1946, saw the first commercial service of the Corporation Sudamericana SA Service seaplanes using the new arrivals in the UK.

Finally, on May 8, 1946, is granted the charter of the Joint Aviation Society Litoral Fluvial Argentino, which is approved by Decree 13.532/46 PEN No 16 May.

The state was represented by National Aeronautics Secretary Brigadier General Staff of the Hill while the underwriters of the shares of private capital to the company's worth mentioning Argentina Dodero Navigation SA, Dodero Navigation Company Argentina SA (in formation) and Rear Admiral Mark A. Zar. Zar.

For the formation of the new company, Corporate Air Service Sudamericana SA should provide MK3 Sunderland LV-AAS "Rio de la Plata" and three Macchi MC-94 registration: LV-ADF LV-LV-AAE and AAF, while that the Navigation Company Argentina SA provide the Sandringham Dodero MK2 "Argentina" (LV-AAO) and "Uruguay" (LV-AAP), two Beechcraft C-45 Expediter, two Douglas DC-3 and six Noorduyn Norseman. El Consolidated 16-1 Commodore LV-AAL no fue acceptado en principio por el Gobierno Nacional, sin embargo, el 23 de diciembre de 1947 es acquirido por ALFA. The Consolidated Commodore 16-1 LV-ALA was not accepted in principle by the Government, however, the December 23, 1947, is acquired by ALFA.

The Sandringham registered, LV-AAR and LV-ACT were flying in FAMA until they were incorporated into the ALFA 30.12.1947 and 26.12.1947 respectively, while the LV-AAQ was incorporated on 2 / 1 / 1948. The operation of the routes was in charge of the Air Service Corporation Sudamericana SA until January 8, 1947, when it finally assumes ALFA operation thereof. That day, three Sandringham departed from the Basin F with different destinations: the LV-AAO, piloted by Andrew Bazzari departed for Inns and scale in Concord, but soon after takeoff had to make a forced landing on water by an engine failure and was towed back to port Bs. As by General Maritime Prefecture. Departed bound for Asunción newcomer UK LV-ACT and bound for Montevideo would the LV-AAP.

The first DC-3 were transferred to the registered ALFA-LV and LV-ABE ABH while ownership of the registered LV-LV-ABT ABU and was retained in 1947 by the Navigation Company Dodero Argentina SA, which were leased to ALFA. None of these aircraft became formally integrate fleet Aerolíneas Argentinas, but were sold to Brazil in 1949.

Contrary to some records specified in the fleet, the Douglas DC-3 LV-ABG was never registered in Argentina and was finally registered ZS-BWZ, 28 November 1947, the name of Suidas International in South Africa.

On January 22, 1947, are recorded in the name of ALFA's UC-64A Norseman registration: LV-AAT, LV-AAU, LV-AAV, LV-AAW, LV-AAX, AAY and LV-LV-AFR enrolled was recorded on 24 March. Also on 22 January of that year were transferred in the name of ALFA, two Beechcraft C-45 Expediter registration: LV-AAZ and LV-ABD.

In March 1948 the Sunderland LV-ASA was sold to CAUSA and named "San Martín", received Uruguayan registration CX-AKF.

ALFA inaugurates nonstop route to Asunción on May 9, 1947.

On July 29, 1948, accident was the only record of the Company, from Rosario and fending ALFA flight 343, the LV-AAP rammed a dredger during the landing on water, and sank with the loss of four crew members and twelve passengers.

On December 24, 1948, a fire in the hangar of Puerto Nuevo which had belonged to South American Air Service Corporation SA in Buenos Aires, are destroyed in the same three Macchi MC-94s, registration: LV-AAF, LV-AAD and AAE, who had never flown for ALFA, which were stored while formalizing wholesale Paraguay. Also destroyed was the Commodore 16 LV-AAL, which had not returned to fly since it was sold by the Air Navigation Sociedad Argentina in 1943.

On 3 May 1949 and by Decree 10 479, the National Government will implement together with firms Aeroposta Argentina, ZONDA and FAMA, giving rise to ARGENTINAS AIRLINES COMPANY STATE 7 December 1950.

== See also ==
- List of defunct airlines of South America
