= Christiansted Harbor Seaplane Base =

Christiansted Harbor Seaplane Base St. Croix Seaplane Base
- IATA: SSB; ICAO: none; FAA LID: VI32

Summary
- Airport type: Private
- Owner: Virgin Islands Port Authority
- Location: Christiansted, St. Croix, U.S. Virgin Islands
- Elevation AMSL: 0 ft (0 m)
- Coordinates: 17°44′50″N 64°42′18″W

Map
- Location in the Saint Croix SSB (the U.S. Virgin Islands)

Runways
Direction	Length		Surface
Direction	ft	m	Surface
E/W	7,000	2,134	Water

Statistics (2005)
- Enplanements: 68,386
- Source: Federal Aviation Administration

Christiansted Harbor Seaplane Base (IATA: SSB, FAA LID: VI32), also known as St. Croix Seaplane Base, is located in the harbor by Christiansted, Saint Croix, U.S. Virgin Islands. This is the location of the Svend Aage Ovesen Seaplane Terminal This private-use airport is owned by the Virgin Islands Port Authority. The sea base is home to Seaborne Airlines U.S. Virgin Islands, the only multi-engine sea plane airline operating in the United States.

As per Federal Aviation Administration records, this seaplane base had 72,632 passenger boardings (enplanements) in calendar year 2004 and 68,386 enplanements in 2005.

== Facilities ==
Christiansted Harbor Seaplane Base has one seaplane landing area:

- Runway E/W: 7,000 ft × 600 ft (2,134 m × 183 m), surface: Water

== Airlines and destinations ==
Airlines	Destinations
Seaborne Airlines	St. Thomas–Harbor

Historically, Virgin Islands Seaplane Shuttle operated scheduled passenger service during the 1980s from the Charlotte Amalie seaplane base with Grumman Mallard aircraft. These Grumman amphibious aircraft were powered either by piston engines or by turboprop engines via a powerplant conversion program. During the 1970s, Antilles Air Boats operated several different types of seaplanes in scheduled passenger service from the harbor as well including the Consolidated PBY Catalina (Super Catalina version), Grumman Goose, Short Sandringham (S-25) and Vought Sikorsky VS-44, and Grumman Mallard.

Both Antilles Airboats and The Virgin Islands Seaplane Shuttle flew to St. Thomas, San Juan, and St. John, with Antilles Airboats serving Fajardo. Today, Seaborne Airlines U.S. Virgin Islands operates De Havilland Twin Otter DHC-6-300s on floats for daily airline service to St Thomas.
