= Seaborne Airlines =

Airline headquartered in San Juan, Puerto Rico

| IATA | ICAO | Call sign |
|---|---|---|
| BB | SBS | SEABORNE |
- Founded: 1992
- Commenced operations: 1992
- AOC #: S9BA675J
- Hubs: Charles F. Blair Seaplane Terminal • Svend Aage Ovesen JR. Seaplane Terminal, USVI
- Fleet size: 1
- Destinations: 2
- Headquarters: San Juan, Puerto Rico
- Key people: Darrell Richardson-CEO & President
- Employees: 100
- Website: seaborneairlines.com

Seaborne Virgin Island Inc, operating as Seaborne Airlines, is a FAR Part 121 airline headquartered in San Juan, Puerto Rico. It operates a seaplane shuttle service between St. Croix and St. Thomas. Originally headquartered on St. Croix in the US Virgin Islands, the company relocated to Puerto Rico in 2014.

Since April 2018, the airline had been owned by its parent company Silver Airways. On June 11, 2025, Silver Airways ceased all operations and sold all their assets. Seaborne stated that they will continue flying despite the liquidation of their parent company. Seaborne's operations are now centrally operated from Christiansted Harbor Seaplane Base on St. Croix with daily flights to St Thomas on De Havilland DHC-6-300 aircraft.

== History ==
Seaborne Airlines was established in St. Croix, US Virgin Islands by founders Ken Dole and Charles Slagle in 1992. The airline initially operated seaplane sightseeing tours with De Havilland Canada DHC-6 Twin Otters, prior to obtaining its FAR Part 135 status and beginning scheduled passenger service in 1994. The airline later obtained its FAR Part 121 status on March 20, 1997. In 2000, the airline was purchased by a new group of investors who began the push from a pure seaplane business to include land-based flights. In 2001, the airline began seaplane service to San Juan, Puerto Rico, serving Fernando Luis Ribas Dominicci Airport, also known as Isla Grande Airport. In late 2008, the airline launched land-based air services to San Juan from both St. Thomas and St. Croix, under the "Seaborne Airshuttle" brand name.

On March 1, 2010, Seaborne Airlines announced Vieques, Puerto Rico as a new destination, with flights to Antonio Rivera Rodríguez Airport from both San Juan and St. Croix for launch on March 18. On December 15, 2010, the airline announced new services to San Juan's Luis Muñoz Marín International Airport from St. Croix, St. Thomas, and Vieques, for launch on January 12, 2011. On October 8, 2012, the airline announced new services to Tortola and Virgin Gorda on the British Virgin Islands, serving Terrance B. Lettsome and Virgin Gorda Airports with flights beginning on December 8. On April 1, 2013, Seaborne Airlines launched its first services with its new Saab 340B aircraft following FAA certification of the type in March. The Saab 340B was also launched alongside a new route to Portsmouth, Dominica, serving Melville Hall Airport (later renamed to Douglas–Charles Airport).

Starting in 2013, Seaborne Airlines began partnering with other airlines through interline and codeshare agreements, with American Airlines as its first partner with interlining agreements on February 14, 2013, followed by codeshare agreements on June 24, 2013. As part of the partnership, the schedules of Seaborne's new services from San Juan to both Pointe-à-Pitre and Fort-de-France in the French Caribbean (announced on March 25, 2013, before launch on June 1, 2013, following a two-month delay in the start of service) were subsequently timed accordingly in the interest of convenient connections with American's San Juan flights. JetBlue became Seaborne's second airline partner, with an interlining agreement established between the two airlines in November 2013, later developing into a codeshare agreement in May 2015.

On October 23, 2013, Seaborne Airlines announced its first destination in the Dominican Republic, with service to La Romana International Airport beginning on December 12, 2013. On November 7, 2013, the airline announced new routes to Saint Kitts and Nevis, with service to both Robert L. Bradshaw and Vance W. Amory International Airports starting on January 15, 2014. On December 18, 2013, Seaborne Airlines announced it was relocating its headquarters from Christiansted, St. Croix to San Juan, the move of which was completed by March 2014. On January 27, 2014, the airline announced service to Santiago de los Caballeros and Punta Cana in the Dominican Republic, with flights to Santiago's Cibao International Airport starting on March 15, 2014, and flights to Punta Cana International Airport starting on February 14, 2014. The airline also launched flights from San Juan to Sint Maarten with flights to Princess Juliana International Airport on March 3, 2014, as well as flights to Santo Domingo with flights to Las Américas International Airport on April 17, 2014.

On March 10, 2014, Delta Air Lines became Seaborne's third airline partner through the establishment of an interline agreement, which later became a codeshare agreement in September 2016. On September 30, 2014, United Airlines joined as Seaborne's fourth airline partner with its own interlining agreement. On March 5, 2015, Seaborne announced Air Europa as its fifth airline partner, with the two airlines codesharing on Seaborne's flights from San Juan and Air Europa's flights from Adolfo Suárez Madrid–Barajas Airport to Santo Domingo's Las Américas International Airport, effective from March 29, 2015, although the codeshare agreement ended at a later date.

On February 18, 2015, Seaborne Airlines announced new services to Anguilla with flights to Clayton J. Lloyd International Airport, starting on April 30, 2015. On September 1, 2015, the airline announced new services to Antigua with flights V. C. Bird International Airport beginning on December 13, 2015. On June 14, 2017, following the year-long suspension of its Antigua services, the airline announced the resumption of services to Antigua for July 21, 2017. On March 8, 2017, Vieques Air Link became an airline partner of Seaborne with a codeshare agreement between the two airlines.

On January 8, 2018, Seaborne Airlines announced its restructuring plan under the Chapter 11 Bankruptcy Code following the 2017 Atlantic hurricane season, specifically Hurricane Irma and Hurricane Maria. The airline announced the acquirement of a $4.2 Million credit facility and entered a purchase agreement with Silver Airways, which was subject to the Court's approval and potential overbids. On March 28, 2018, it was announced that Seaborne was bought by Silver Airways, with the acquisition completed on April 22, 2018.

On August 28, 2019, it was announced that reservations for travel on Seaborne Airlines flights would be booked through the Silver Airways website, with Seaborne's reservation system integrated with Silver's on September 1, 2019.

On December 30, 2024, Seaborne's parent Silver Airways filed for Chapter 11 bankruptcy protection. The company continues operations throughout the procedure with plans to exit bankruptcy by the first quarter of 2025.

On June 11, 2025, it was reported that Silver Airways would cease all operations effective immediately and sell all their assets. Despite this, Seaborne Airlines continued to operate independently, with regular flights continuing operation. On July 29, 2025, Silver Airways converted its Chapter 11 case to a Chapter 7 bankruptcy liquidation.

== Corporate affairs ==
The airline is headquartered in the CAF2 building on the grounds of Luis Muñoz Marín International Airport in Carolina, Puerto Rico.

Prior to Seaborne's acquisition by Silver Airways in 2018, Seaborne's president and chief executive officer (CEO) was Gary Foss. Following the acquisition, Steve Rossum, the CEO of Silver Airways, took over as CEO of the combined company. Mr Rossum appointed Thomas Hanley as the executive director of Seaborne in 2023 with designs of restoring Seaborne services, destinations, and expansion. Today, Seaborne provides the Virgin Islands' only seaplane airline service between St Thomas and St Croix daily, with new destinations in 2024.

== Destinations ==
As of August 2020, Seaborne Airlines operates or has previously operated to the following listed destinations. The list does not include destinations served only by its parent company Silver Airways, with which the two airlines share operations based at Luis Muñoz Marín International Airport.

| Country or territory | City or island | Airport or seaplane base | Notes | Ref. |
|---|---|---|---|---|
| Anguilla | The Valley | Clayton J. Lloyd International Airport | | |
| Antigua and Barbuda | St. John's | V. C. Bird International Airport | | |
| British Virgin Islands | Tortola | Road Town Seaplane Base | Terminated | |
| British Virgin Islands | Tortola | Terrance B. Lettsome International Airport | | |
| British Virgin Islands | Virgin Gorda | Virgin Gorda Airport | Terminated | |
| Dominica | Marigot | Douglas–Charles Airport | | |
| Dominican Republic | La Romana | La Romana International Airport | Terminated | |
| Dominican Republic | Punta Cana | Punta Cana International Airport | Terminated | |
| Dominican Republic | Santiago de los Caballeros | Cibao International Airport | | |
| Dominican Republic | Santo Domingo | Las Américas International Airport | Terminated | |
| Guadeloupe | Pointe-à-Pitre | Pointe-à-Pitre International Airport | Terminated | |
| Martinique | Fort-de-France | Martinique Aimé Césaire International Airport | Terminated | |
| Puerto Rico | San Juan | Fernando Luis Ribas Dominicci Airport | Terminated | |
| Puerto Rico | San Juan | Luis Muñoz Marín International Airport | Hub | |
| Puerto Rico | San Juan | San Juan Seaplane Base | Terminated | |
| Puerto Rico | Vieques | Antonio Rivera Rodríguez Airport | Terminated | |
| Saint Kitts and Nevis | Basseterre | Robert L. Bradshaw International Airport | | |
| Saint Kitts and Nevis | Nevis | Vance W. Amory International Airport | | |
| Sint Maarten | Philipsburg | Princess Juliana International Airport | | |
| United States Virgin Islands | St. Croix | Christiansted Harbor Seaplane Base | | |
| United States Virgin Islands | St. Croix | Henry E. Rohlsen International Airport | | |
| United States Virgin Islands | St. Thomas | Charlotte Amalie Harbor Seaplane Base | | |
| United States Virgin Islands | St. Thomas | Cyril E. King International Airport | | |

=== Interline agreements ===
The airline has interlining agreements with the following airlines:

- United Airlines
- Hahn Air

=== Codeshare agreements ===
The airline has codeshare agreements with the following airlines:

- American Airlines
- Delta Air Lines
- JetBlue
- Vieques Air Link

== Fleet ==
=== Current fleet ===
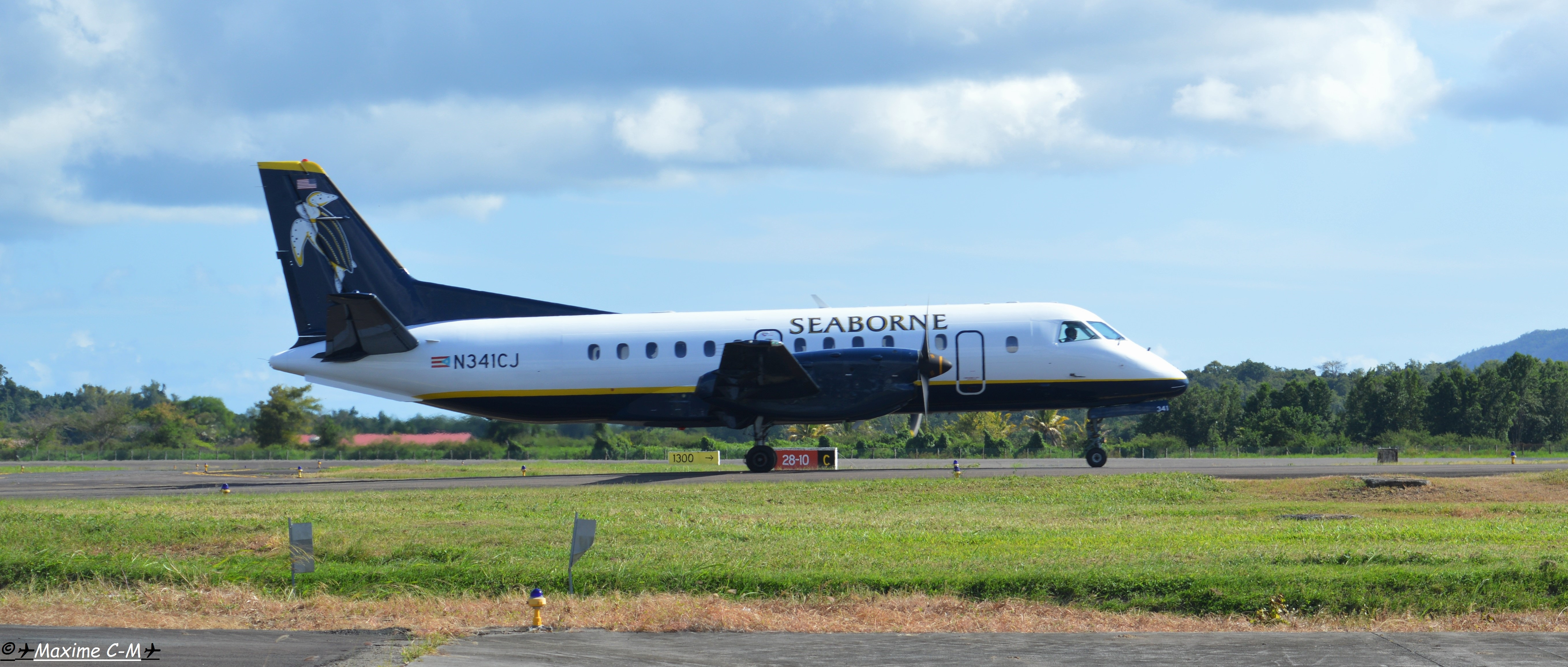
A Seaborne Airlines Saab 340

As of August 2025, Seaborne Airlines operates the following aircraft:

Seaborne Airlines fleet
| Aircraft | In service | Orders | Passengers | Notes |
|---|---|---|---|---|
| De Havilland Canada DHC-6 Twin Otter | 1 | — | 15 | Operates seaplane services. |
| Total | 1 | | | |

=== Fleet development ===
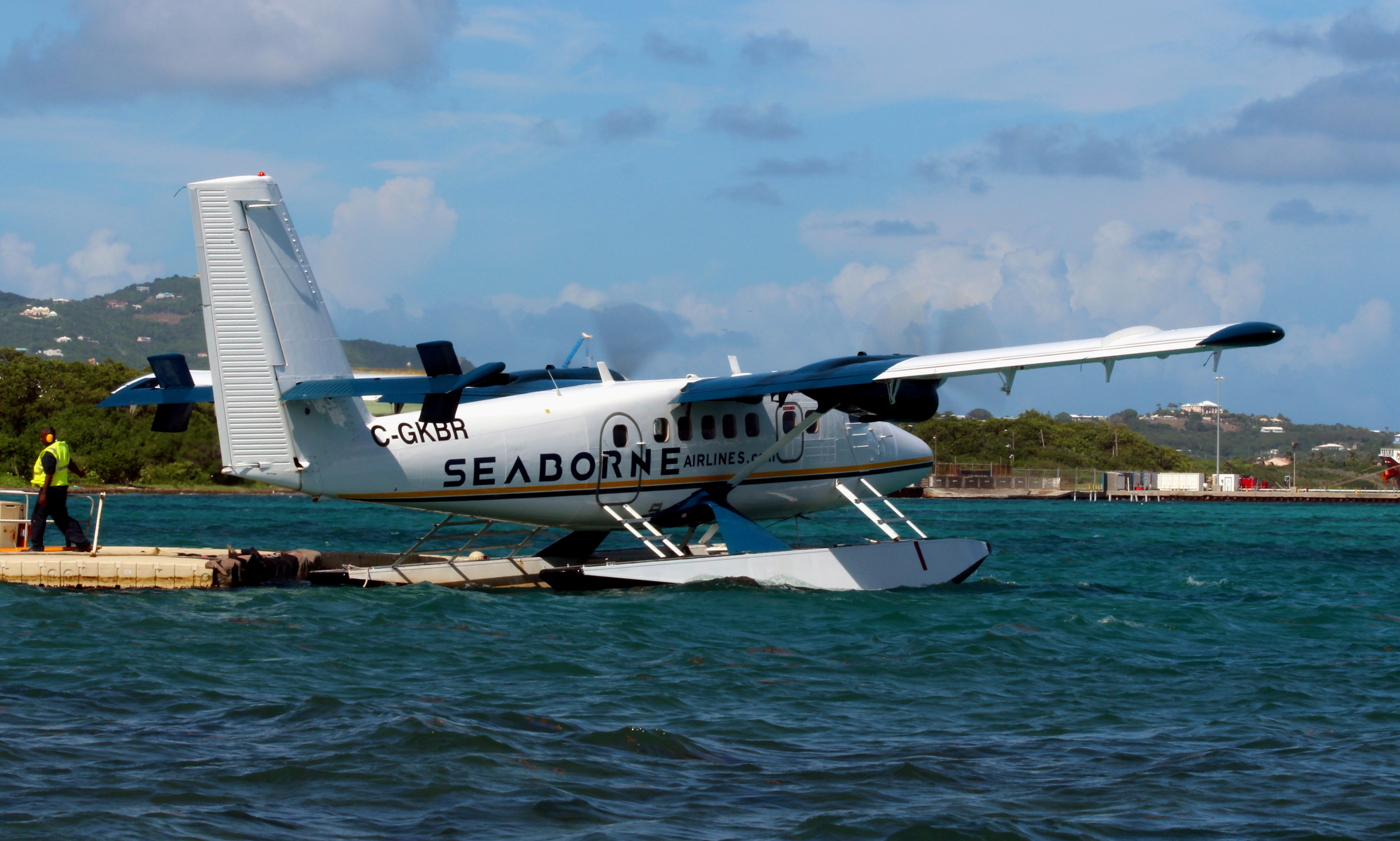
A Seaborne Airlines de Havilland Canada DHC-6 Twin Otter at Christiansted Harbor Seaplane Base on St. Croix

Seaborne Airlines' De Havilland Canada DHC-6 Twin Otters, leased from Kenn Borek Air, are equipped with Wipline 13000 floats. The Twin Otters provide near hourly service between seaplane bases at Chistiansted Harbor in St. Croix and Charlotte Amalie Harbor in St. Thomas.

Saab 340 aircraft began scheduled operations with the airline in April 2013, and served all land-based destinations and airports. Each aircraft had a different marine animal painted on the tailfin, consisting of a dolphin, lobster, manta ray, marlin, octopus, seahorse, sea turtle, or shark. Of the eight Saab 340s, six originally flew for American Eagle, while two were originally from Formosa Airlines. Prior to Seaborne's acquisition of its Saab 340s, the Twin Otters were used for both land and water operations.

=== Former fleet ===
The airline previously operated the following aircraft:

- 1 further De Havilland Canada DHC-6 Twin Otter
