= Compañía Aeronáutica Uruguaya =

CAUSA Compañía Aeronáutica Uruguaya S.A.
- Founded: December 29, 1936
- Commenced operations: March 12, 1938
- Ceased operations: 1967
- Hubs: Carrasco International Airport
- Headquarters: Carrasco, Montevideo, Uruguay

Compañía Aeronáutica Uruguaya S.A. (CAUSA) was a private airline company in Uruguay, which operated between 1938 and 1967.

== History ==
Logo used in the 1950s.

Compañía Aeronáutica Uruguaya SA (The Uruguay Aeronautics Company Ltd.) was founded on December 29, 1936, by the Uruguayan banker Luis J. Supervielle and Colonel Tydeo Larre Borges. The airline intended to concentrate its operations on the busy and financially lucrative Montevideo-Buenos Aires route.

Operations began on March 12, 1938, with two Junkers Ju 52s carrying seventeen passengers and configured as floatplanes. The Junkers 52s were well-built, new, strong, dependable, aircraft and a good economic choice for CAUSA. At the same time the Junkers 52 was used as the main airliner by Deutsche Lufthansa and as transports (and sometimes as bombers) by the Luftwaffe. The Junkers airplanes acquired by CAUSA were the CX-ABA(C/N 5877) baptized "El Uruguayo" and the CX-ABB(C/N 5886) "El Argentino".

CAUSA's entry to the airline market at that time put it in competition with the Argentine airline corporation, Sudamericana de Servicios Aéreos (South-American Air Services), which also connected the ports of the two capitals. By January 1940, a route to the holiday resort of Punta del Este was added. In 1943 another new route was opened between Buenos Aires and Colonia, only 35 miles across the Rio de la Plata. In Colonia, a bus service ran to CAUSA's main offices at Montevideo. These three routes were the only ones operated by the airline in its nearly 30 years of service.

At the end of World War II, CAUSA began competing with the Argentine airline A.L.F.A., precursor of the future Aerolíneas Argentinas, and purchased two modified Short Sunderland flying boats. After reaping success, the company decided to buy a third flying boat. This one was delivered in 1946. The Short Sunderlands were the CX-AFA(C/N SH.5C) "General Artigas", the CX-AKF(C/N SH.6C) ex-"Corporación Sudamericana de Servicios Aéreos" and the CX-AKR(C/N SH 60C) "Capitán Boiso Lanza".

== Short Sunderland CX-AKR "Capitán Boiso Lanza" (1946) ==
By 1950, with the continuing success of the flying boat services, two Short Sandringham 7s were purchased and added to the fleet: the CX-ANA(C/N SH.59C)ex BOAC and the CX-ANI(C/N SH.58C) also an ex BOAC airplane. The flying boats remained in service until 1963. Two of the flying boats were written-off after accidents (the Short Sandringham CX-ANA on October 22, 1955, and the Short Sunderland CX-AFA on September 11, 1956) and retired from service. By 1961, flying boats were declining as passenger's choice of preference. The service was finally suspended as of May 1962.

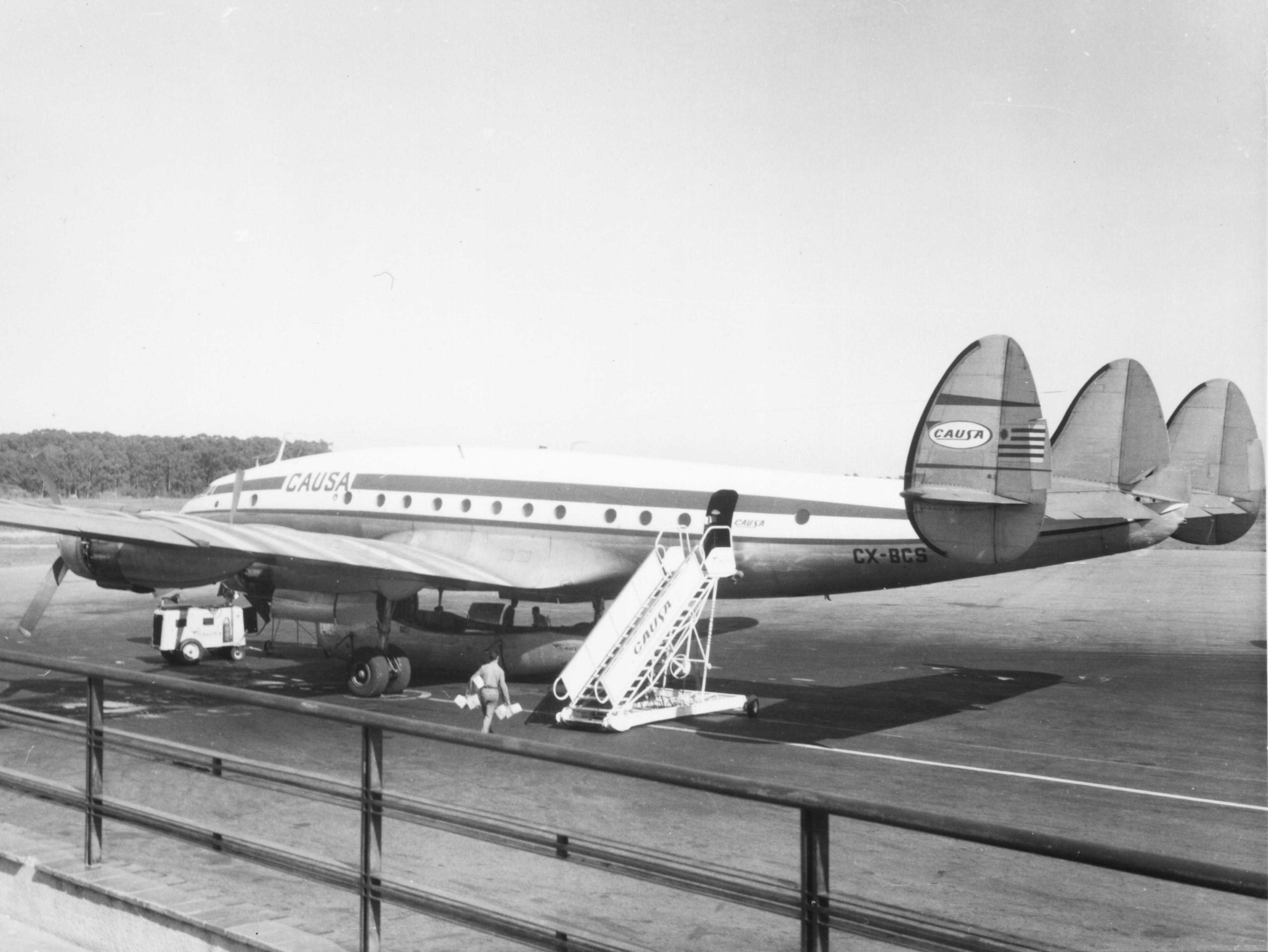
Lockheed L-749A Constellation CX-BCS(ex KLM PH-TFD "Arnhem") at Carrasco Airport, Montevideo in 1965.

The airline decided to revise its strategy and purchased four Curtiss C-46 landplanes to supplement the shortage. The airplanes acquired in 1961 were the C-46F CX-AYR c/n 22403, C-46A CX-AZS c/n 30393 ex-Real Aerovías Brasil, C-46F CX-BAH c/n 22531 and the C-46F CX-BAM c/n 22392. The C-46 service was very short and by 1964 all four airplanes were sold to ARCO Aerolíneas Colonia S.A. It was then decided to use more capable types and in 1962 a purchase contract was signed with KLM for three Lockheed Constellations model L-749A.

Two of the Constellations were delivered in 1962 and the third arrived in 1963. These fine looking airplanes with a beautiful shape were familiar and appreciated sights on its daily arrivals at the airports in Buenos Aires Aeroparque or Montevideo Carrasco. The Constellations of CAUSA were the CX-BBM (C/N 2881) ex PH-TFG, CX-BBN (C/N 2641) ex PH-TFE and the CX-BCS (C/N 2640) ex PH-TFD. Another Lockhheed L1049H was leased in June 1966. The Constellations remained in service until the demise of the airline by May 1967. In the end, the airline announced its intention to operate a Montevideo to São Paulo route and a Montevideo to Miami route, but these routes never materialized.

== Fleet ==
1938

CX-ABA Junkers Ju 52/3m c/n 5877 "El Uruguayo" (The Uruguayan) (hydroplane)

CX-ABB Junkers Ju 52/3m c/n 5886 "El Argentino" (The Argentinean)(hydroplane)

1946

CX-AFA Short Sunderland c/n SH.5C "General Artigas" ex-R.A.F. w/o 11 September 1956

CX-AKF Short Sunderland c/n SH.6C ex-A.L.F.A.-Corporación Sudamericana de Servicios Aéreos (South American Corporation of Air Services)

CX-AKR Short Sunderland c/n SH 60C "Capitán Boiso Lanza" (Captain Boiso Lanza) ex-R.A.F.

1950

CX-ANA Short Sandringham 7 c/n SH.59C ex- B.O.A.C. w/o 22 October 1955

CX-ANI Short Sandringham 7 c/n SH.58C ex- B.O.A.C.

1961

CX-AYR Curtiss C-46F c/n 22403

CX-AZS Curtiss C-46A c/n 30393, ex-Real Aerovías Brasil (ex-Real Brazil Airways)

CX-BAH Curtiss C-46F c/n 22531

CX-BAM Curtiss C-46F c/n 22392

1963

CX-BBM Lockheed L-749A-79-3 c/n 2661 ex KLM PH-TFG "Friesland"

CX-BBN Lockheed L-749A-79-33 c/n 2641 ex KLM PH-TFE "Utrecht"

CX-BCS Lockheed L-749A-79-33 c/n 2640 ex KLM PH-TFD "Arnhem"

1966

CX-BEM Lockheed L-1049H c/n 4818 ex N101R (leased)
