= Short Sandringham =

Flying boat airliner

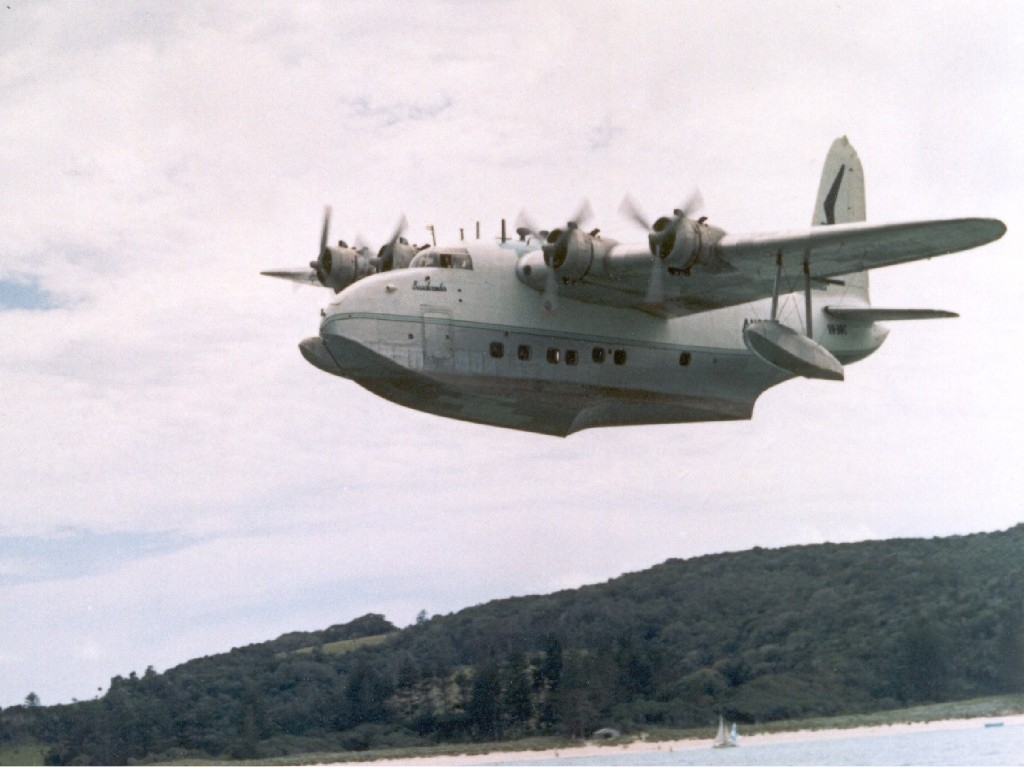
- Ansett Sandringham taking off from Lord Howe Island in the early 1960s

General information
- Type: Civil flying boat
- Manufacturer: Short Brothers
- Status: Out of production, out of service
- Primary users: British Overseas Airways Corporation (BOAC) Qantas; TEAL; Ansett Flying Boat Services

History
- Introduction date: 1943
- First flight: January 1943
- Retired: 1974 (Ansett Flying Boat Services)
- Developed from: Short Sunderland

The Short S.25 Sandringham is a British civilian flying boat designed and originally produced by Short Brothers. They were produced as conversions of the widely used Short Sunderland, a military flying boat that was commonly used as a maritime patrol aircraft.

Prior to the Sandringham, numerous Sunderlands which had been built for the Royal Air Force (RAF) had been converted to a civilian configuration as early as 1942 to fulfil a requirement of the British Overseas Airways Corporation (BOAC) for additional long range airliners. This need led to the development of the Short Hythe, which was a somewhat austere conversion due to its development taking place amid the Second World War. Around the conclusion to the conflict, Shorts was keen to produce a more refined and capable conversion of the Sunderland; the first prototype of which, performed its maiden flight during November 1945, became known as the Sandringham I.

The BOAC quickly sought to procure the Sandringham for its fleet, the demand for which led to production of the Sandringham II along with multiple further improved versions. Being operated initially alongside the Hythes, the more comfortable conditions onboard the Sandringhams led to them being given greater priority for usage and routing alike. Various other operators also procured the type, including TEAL, Qantas and Ansett. The Sandringham soon became outclassed by land-based airliners, including the arrival of faster jetliners, thus their operations curtailed substantially during the late 1950s. The final scheduled service performed by the type was ended during the 1970s. A total of three Sandringhams are believed to have survived to the present day in preservation.

== Design and development ==
=== Background ===
At the height of the Second World War, it was recognised that the UK's flagship airline, the British Overseas Airways Corporation (BOAC), required new aircraft in its inventory. It was promptly recognised that, as the Short Sunderland military flying boats operated by the Royal Air Force (RAF) bore considerable similarities to the Short Empire, a civilian flying boat, there were few challenges posed by converting excess Sunderlands for civil purposes if deemed necessary. Accordingly, during December 1942, work started on six Sunderland IIIs from Short's Rochester works, stripping them of their armaments and military fittings, being instead refitted for airline purposes, having austere bench-type seats installed within the cabin along with civil markings and registrations across their exteriors. On 26 December 1942, the first of the conversions performed its maiden flight. After being delivered to BOAC, these flying boats were quickly used on the airline's Poole-West Africa service, transporting both passengers and air mail alike.

The initial batch having been determined to be satisfactory, a further six Sunderlands were converted for similar purposes in 1943, along with a further batch of 12 during the following year. Following the end of the Second World War, BOAC opted to convert its Sunderlands to a less-austere standard, making them more suitable for peace-time operations; they became known as the Short Hythe. Specific changes including the replacement of the somewhat primitive bench seats with individual seats, initially permitting up to sixteen passengers to be accommodated on one deck in the initial H.1 configuration. Improved models, such as the H.2 variant, featured the addition of a promenade deck, while the H.3 configuration, featured an additional eight seats. Up to 6,500 pounds (2,900 kg) of mail could also be carried. Engines were standardised as the Bristol Pegasus 38.

=== Post-war conversions ===
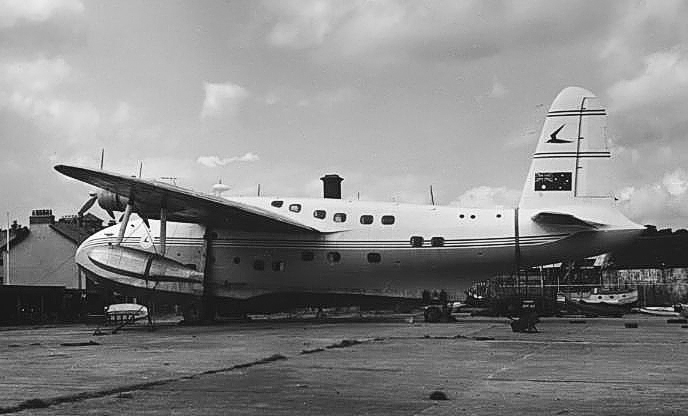
Short Sandringham 7 VH-APG at Cowes in 1954

Even prior to the end of the conflict, it had been identified that, while the converted Sunderlands had proved to be successful, there were areas for improvement. Specifically, the temporary and somewhat basic fairings implemented to cover turret positions could be replaced by more sophisticated low-drag counterparts to improve aerodynamic efficiency. Deciding to proceed with this work, in November 1945, Shorts thus flew a refined conversion of BOAC's Sunderlands from their Rochester works. The conversions commenced with removal of their armaments and military fittings, removal of the bow and stern sections and then removal of the paint down to the bare metal before the extent of the corrosion was assessed and treated before reskinning of a considerable amount of the below waterline structure to restore its watertightness. Along with the revised low-drag fairings that were installed on both the nose and tail, a refurbished interior was installed. This flying boat was referred to as the Sandringham; it subsequently became known as the Sandringham 1 to distinguish it from the more advanced conversions which had interiors customized to each customer, which followed it.

During January 1946, a certificate of airworthiness was issued for the Sandringham I, it entered service with BOAC in June of that year after completing operational trials with RAF Transport Command. Around this time, BOAC opted to have all of its Sunderlands refurbished to a standard akin to contemporary airliners. Shorts had envisioned BOAC issuing a prompt order for Sandringhams, but the first order for the type came from the Argentine airline Compañía Argentina de Aeronavegación Dodero instead. The airline had been keen to procure Sunderlands for its South American intercity routes, and had been impressed by information provided by Shorts on the Sandringham conversion. Ordered in two batches, one for short-haul routes and the other for longer distances, the first Sandringham II was launched to great ceremony at Belfast on 17 November 1945.

There were several differences between the Sandringham I and the following production flying boats. While the first prototype had retained the Pegasus engines, common to both the Sunderland III and Hythe, later models of the Sandringham, which were converted by Short and Harland Ltd at Belfast Harbour, were based on the later Sunderland V, which were instead powered by Pratt & Whitney "Twin Wasp" engines. Every Sandringham was converted from surplus Sunderlands that had been formerly operated by RAF Coastal Command.

During 1963, an additional conversion of a former Royal New Zealand Air Force Sunderland V was carried out by Ansett to a similar standard to the Sandringham. This aircraft, named Islander, was fitted with a 43-seat interior. Its conversion had been necessitated following the loss of an earlier Sandringham due to a cyclone that had torn it from its moorings.

== Operational history ==
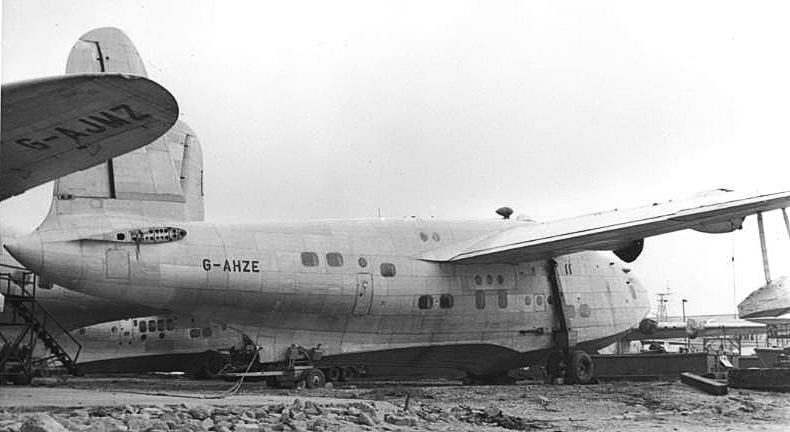
Short Sandringham 5 G-AHZE of BOAC at Hamworthy Quay, Poole, Dorset in September 1954

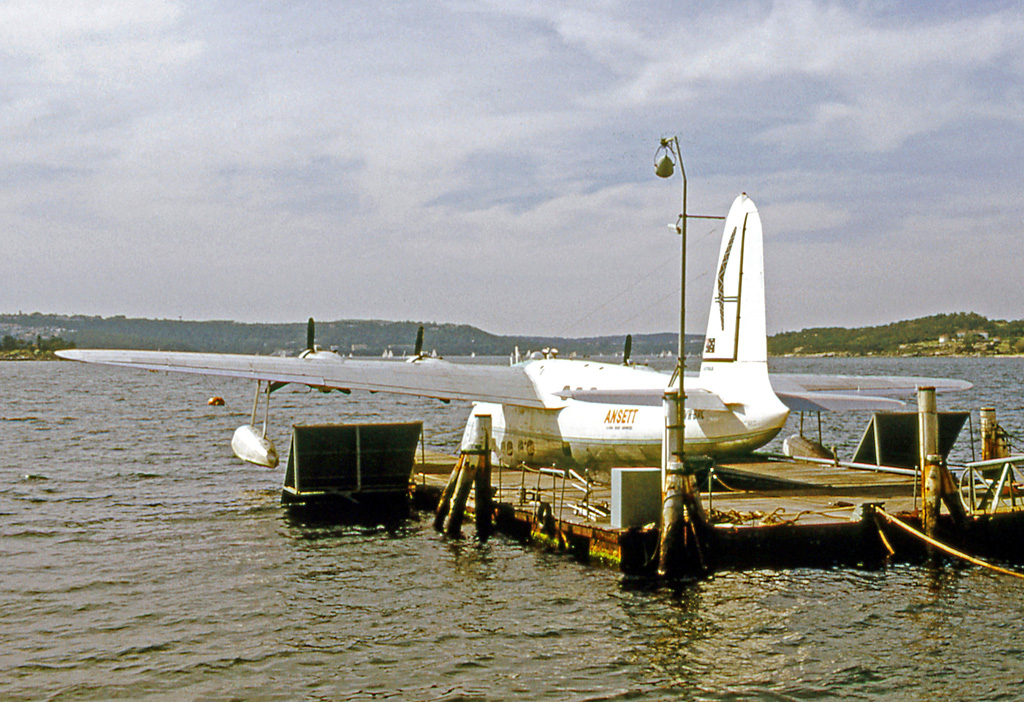
Ansett Sandringham at Rose Bay Sydney in 1970

The converted Sunderlands commenced operations with BOAC on its route between Poole Harbour, Dorset and Lagos, Nigeria in March 1943. Following a proving flight to British India, the Sunderlands were transferred in October 1943 to flights between Poole and Karachi, via Gibraltar and Cairo. As Egypt was under military control, the aircraft were given military serial numbers and operated as part of RAF Transport Command. The service was extended to Calcutta in May 1944, while VE-Day, the end of the war in Europe, allowed the aircraft to revert to BOAC control. They continued on the India route, which was extended again to Rangoon in Burma following VJ-Day.

During 1946, BOAC's fleet of Hythes commenced long distance flights to Australia; on 12 May 1946, the Poole–Sydney route, which were operated in conjunction with the Australian airline Qantas, commenced. In August of that year, BOAC's Hythes were also deployed on services to Hong Kong on what was known as the Dragon route.

It was in 1946 that the initial production models of the Sandringham proved themselves to be capable performers in the South American market. Multiple airlines in Argentina, as well as the Uruguayan airline CAUSA, became early operators of the type. Aerolíneas Argentinas would operate Sandringhams in a passenger role up until 1962, after which they saw use as freighters up until the late 1960s.

In 1946, BOAC recognised that its existing fleet of flying boats was insufficient to perform all of the routes it envisioned, thus the airline placed its first order for the Sandringham. During the following year, the Sandringham 5 was introduced into service with BOAC, which referred to it as the "Plymouth class" and operated it mainly the company's Far East routes from Southampton via Alexandria to Hong Kong and Tokyo. The type quickly proved to be both reliable and popular with the travelling public, leading to BOAC ordering the improved Sandringham 6, which it called the Bermuda Class, in 1948. However, these operations were quickly overshadowed by other developments, with BOAC choosing to replace its flying boats on several routes with land-based Lockheed Constellation airliners during 1949.

The New Zealand-based airline TEAL was another early operator of the Sandringham, using it primarily on the Auckland to Sydney route as well as flights to various Pacific Islands. The airline opted to discontinue Sandringham operations on 19 December 1949, selling its fleet onto other airlines. In 1950, Qantas introduced the first of five aircraft which flew from the Rose Bay flying boat base on Sydney Harbour to destinations in New Caledonia, New Hebrides, Fiji, New Guinea and Lord Howe Island; two of these were purchased from TEAL and the other three were purchased from BOAC. Qantas kept its Sandringhams in regular service through to 1955.

The Sandringham was used by Ansett Flying Boat Services on the Sydney (Rose Bay) to Lord Howe Island scheduled service until 1974. One of Ansett's Sandringhams was converted from a S-25 Sunderland previously owned by the Royal New Zealand Air Force. The Sandringham was also operated by the Norwegian airline DNL – Norwegian Airlines between 1946 and 1952 on the domestic service from Oslo to Tromsø. This small fleet was specially equipped for flying in cold conditions, although services had to be halted during the winter regardless; they also featured the same air-to-surface-vessel radar sets as fitted to the wartime Sunderland V for navigation purposes, helping the crew avoid mountainsides and safely operate from the fjords.

In October 1954, Captain Sir Gordon Taylor flew his newly acquired Sandringham 7 from the UK to Australia to begin a series of flying boat cruises of the south Pacific. The aircraft later passed to Réseau Aérien Interinsulaire in Tahiti and is presently stored at the Musée de l'Air et de l'Espace at Paris Le Bourget.

One of the last operators of the Sandringham was Antilles Air Boats in the Virgin Islands of the Caribbean which flew the aircraft in scheduled passenger service into the 1970s with flights from the Charlotte Amalie Harbor Seaplane Base on Saint Thomas and the Christiansted Harbor Seaplane Base on Saint Croix among other destinations.

== Variants ==
Hythe
Modification of Sunderland III for BOAC, with seats for 16–24 passengers. 23 converted.
Sandringham 1
Full civil conversion of Sunderland 3 for BOAC, accommodating 24 day or 16 sleeper passengers, and powered by four 1,030 hp (768 kW) Bristol Pegasus 38 engines. One converted.
Sandringham 2
Civil conversion of Sunderland 5 for Argentine airline Dodero, accommodating 45 day passengers. Powered by four R-1830-92 engines, three conversions.
Sandringham 3
Conversion of Sunderland 5 with dining room and galley on upper deck and seats for 21 on lower deck. Two converted.
Sandringham 4
Four converted for TEAL of New Zealand (Tasman class). These had Pratt & Whitney R-1830-92C Twin Wasp engines. The aircraft had two decks and could accommodate a total of 30 passengers. The upper deck had the flight deck forward of the wing spar, to the rear of which was the pantry (with a dumbwaiter to the lower deck), the crew's quarters, then a 10 seat passenger cabin from which a staircase led down to the lower deck which had seating for 20 passengers. Two were sold to Qantas and operated by them between 1950 and 1955, with the remaining two sold to Ansett.
Sandringham 5
Nine converted for BOAC (Plymouth class), accommodating 22 day or 16 sleeper passengers. Three of these were sold to Qantas which operated them between 1951 and 1955.
Sandringham 6
Radar equipped aircraft for Norwegian airline DNL. 37 passengers. Five converted.
Sandringham 7
Thirty seat aircraft for BOAC (Bermuda class). Three converted.
Islander
An additional civil conversion by Ansett officially described as a Sunderland Mark V (Modified).

== Operators ==
Argentina

- Aerolíneas Argentinas
- Sociedad Mixta Aviación del Litoral Fluvial Argentino (ALFA)
- Cooperativa Asociación Argentina de Aeronavegantes
- Compañía Argentina de Aeronavegación Dodero

Australia

- Ansett
- Barrier Reef Airways
- QANTAS

France

- Reseau Aerien Interinsulaire (RAI) and successor Air Polynesie (now Air Tahiti) in French Polynesia

New Zealand

- TEAL

Norway

- Det Norske Luftfartselskap

United Kingdom

- BOAC

Uruguay

- Compañía Aeronáutica Uruguaya S.A. (CAUSA)

United States

- Antilles Air Boats

== Surviving aircraft ==
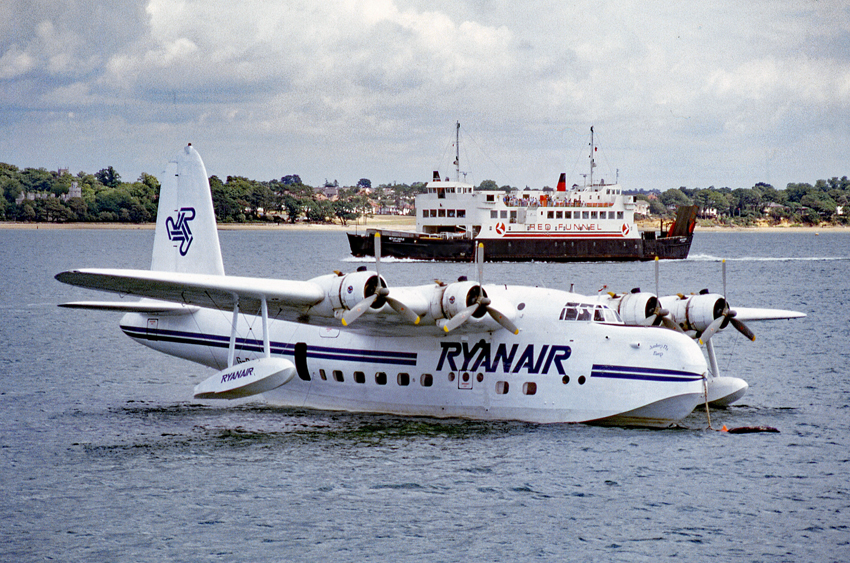
Spirit of Foynes moored off Hythe Pier, Southampton Water (1989). In Ryanair colours, painted for a proposed sponsor deal with the Foynes Flying Boat Museum that did not come to fruition.

- Ex-Ansett Sandringham (RAF Serial ML814 Short Sunderland MR5) c/n SH.974b. To RNZAF No.5 Squadron 1953 Fiji and became NZ4108. Hobsonville, New Zealand 1956–1963. Sold 1963 to Airlines of New South Wales. Converted to passenger configuration and registered VH-BRF and named Islander. To Antilles Air Boats, Virgin Island as N158J in 1974. To Edward Hulton in the UK in 1979 as G-BJHS Spirit of Foynes. Storm damaged and repaired. Sold to Kermit Weeks in 1992 and re-registered N158J. On display at the Fantasy of Flight museum in Polk City, Florida, USA with Kermit Weeks and registered as N814ML on 16 September 1993.

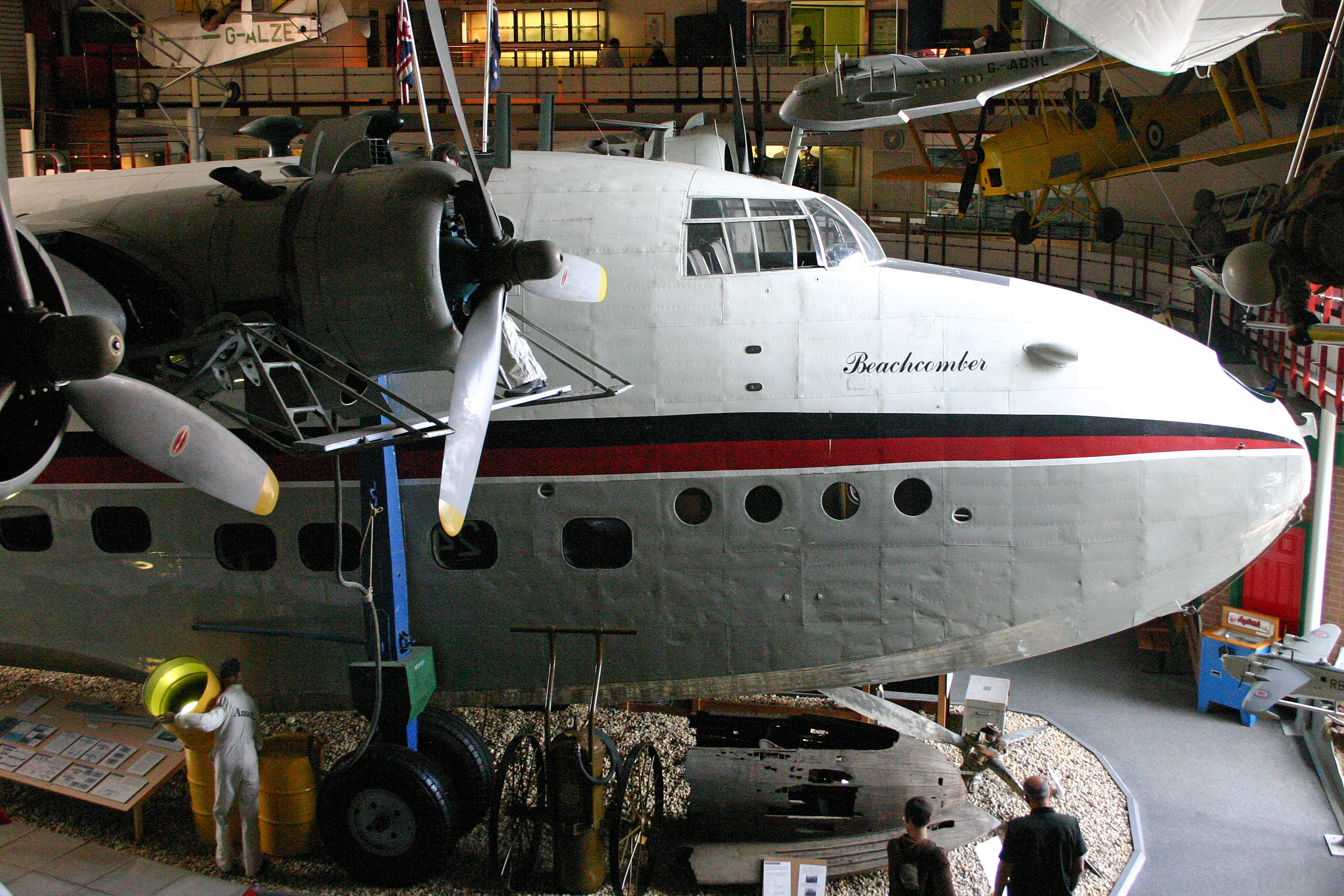
Sandringham JM715 (VH-BRC), Solent Sky museum, Southampton, England, (2011)

- Ex-Ansett Sandringham (RAF Serial JM715 Short Sunderland Mk III). After sale by RAF to Shorts on 30 April 1947, it was converted to civilian configuration at Short's Belfast factory. The aircraft was allocated the conversion number SH.55C and registered by TEAL as ZK-AMH and named Auckland. it was delivered from Southampton to Waitemata Harbour, Auckland on 29 October 1947 and was soon in service on the 1,300-mile Sydney–Auckland route. In May 1950, ZK-AMH, was sold to Barrier Reef Airlines of Australia who it renamed it Coral Clipper with the registration VH-BRC. Barrier Reef Airlines were subsequently taken over by the major Australian airline Ansett in 1952 and became Ansett Flying Boat Services and operated out of Rose Bay, Sydney, Australia until 1974 with the name Beachcomber. In that year the flying boat was acquired by Antilles Air Boats who in 1980 renamed her Southern Cross. By the time the company went out of business in 1978 the flying boat was in very poor condition. In 1981 the aircraft was purchased for the National Aeronautical Collection by the Science Museum and is now on display with the name Beachcomber at Solent Sky museum in Southampton, Hampshire, United Kingdom.

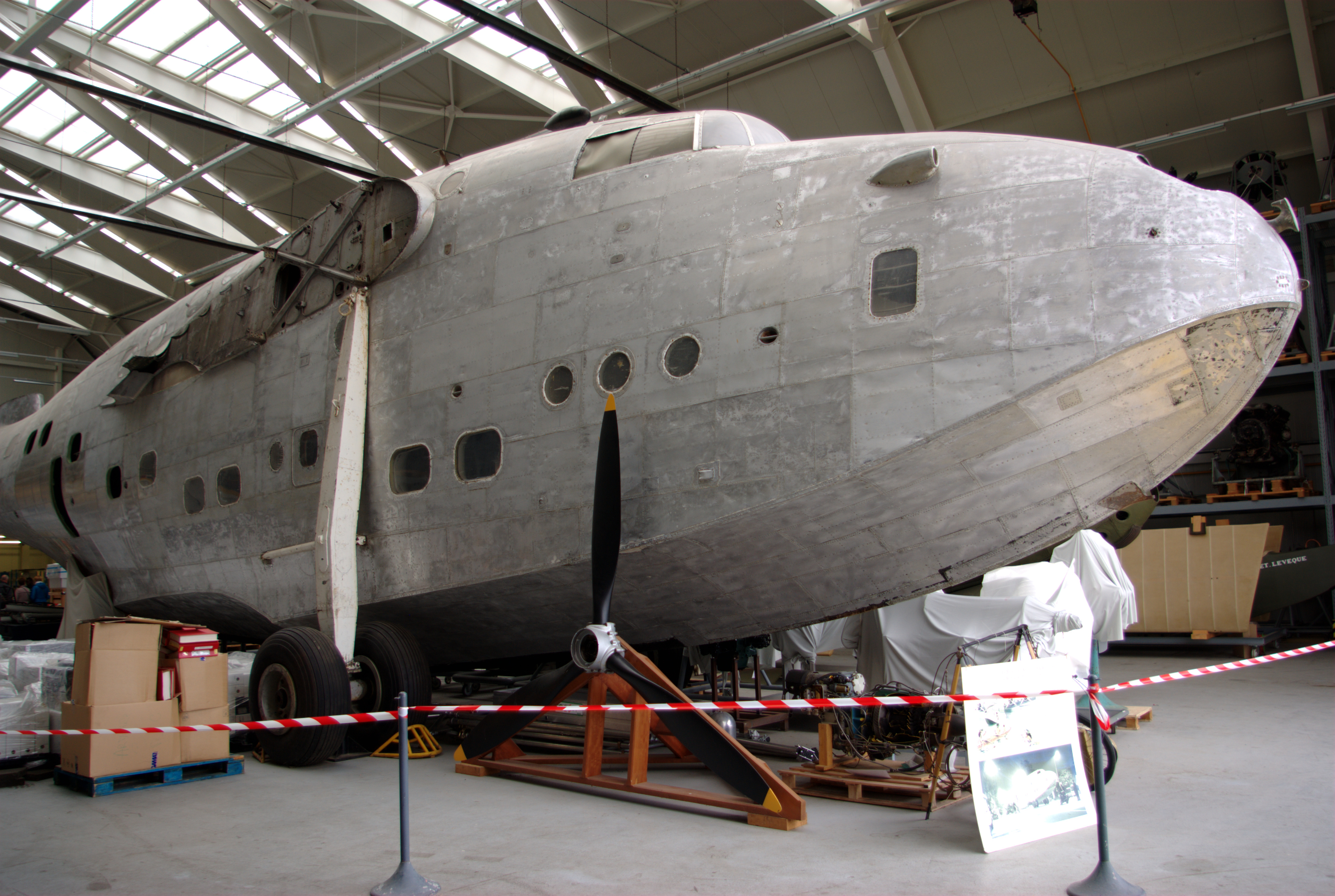
Short S.25 Sandringham Mk7 Bermuda F-OBIP at the Musée de l'Air et de l'Espace (2015)

- Short S-25 Sandringham 7 Bermuda Class. c/n SH-57C. Built as a (RAF Serial JM719 Short Sunderland Mk III). Converted to Short S-25 Sandringham 7 Bermuda Class 1947 for BOAC British Register as G-AKCO St. George. Sold to Sir Patrick Gordon Taylor 1954. Registered VH-APG Frigate Bird III. Sold to Reseau Aerian Interinsulaire 1958. Registered F-OBIP. Final Flight 1970 Papeete, Tahiti. Initially donated to Queensland Air Museum 1975. Relocation proved cost prohibitive. Acquired by Musée de l'Air et de l'Espace at Le Bourget Airport, 1977. Transported by French military to Paris in 1979 and placed on display, but was severely damaged during a storm on 8 February 1984. Under restoration since 2008, and as of January 2018 not currently viewable by the public.

== Specifications (Sandringham 5) ==
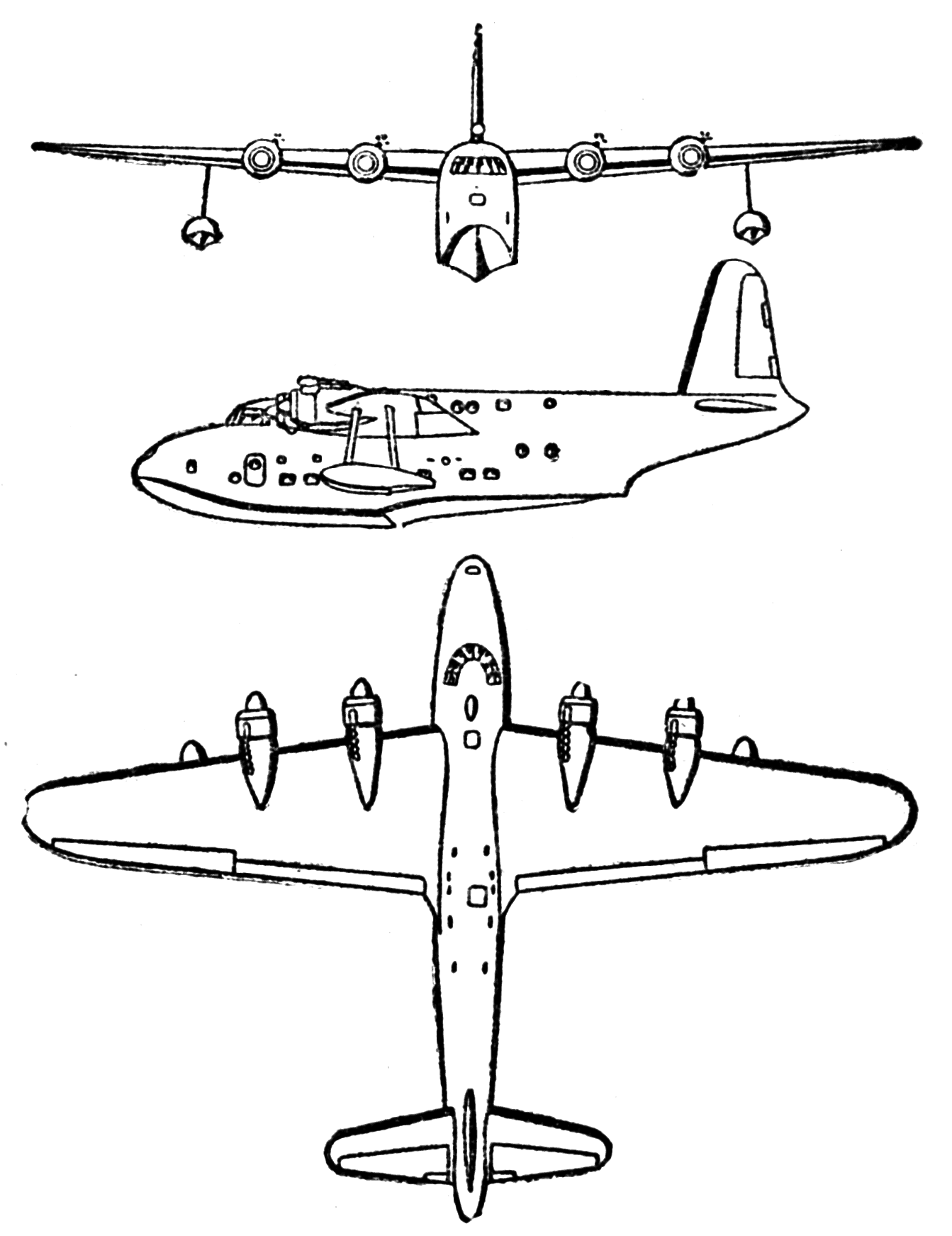
Short Sandringham 3-view drawing from Les Ailes March 29, 1947

Data from British Civil Aircraft 1919–1972

General characteristics

- Crew: 5
- Capacity: 22 day passengers or 16 sleeper passengers
- Length: 86 ft 3 in (26.29 m)
- Wingspan: 112 ft 9.5 in (34.379 m)
- Height: 22 ft 10.5 in (6.972 m)
- Wing area: 1,687 sq ft (156.7 m^{2})
- Airfoil: Göttingen 436 modified
- Empty weight: 39,498 lb (17,916 kg)
- Gross weight: 60,000 lb (27,216 kg)
- Fuel capacity: 2,032 imp gal (2,440 US gal; 9,238 L)
- Powerplant: 4 × Pratt & Whitney R-1830-92D Twin Wasp / -90B 14-cylinder air-cooled radial piston engines, 1,200 hp (890 kW) each
- Propellers: 4-bladed Hamilton Standard Hydromatic, 12 ft 1 in (3.68 m) diameter constant-speed propellers

Performance

- Maximum speed: 206 mph (332 km/h, 179 kn)
- Cruise speed: 176 mph (283 km/h, 153 kn)
- Range: 2,440 mi (3,930 km, 2,120 nmi)
- Service ceiling: 17,900 ft (5,500 m)
- Rate of climb: 840 ft/min (4.3 m/s)
- Wing loading: 35.6 lb/sq ft (174 kg/m^{2})
- Power/mass: 0.08 hp/lb (0.13 kW/kg)

== See also ==
- RAF Gatow

Aircraft of comparable role, configuration, and era

- Short S.26

Related lists

- List of aircraft of the Royal Air Force
