= Charlotte Amalie Harbor Seaplane Base =

Charlotte Amalie Harbor Seaplane Base St. Thomas Seaplane Base
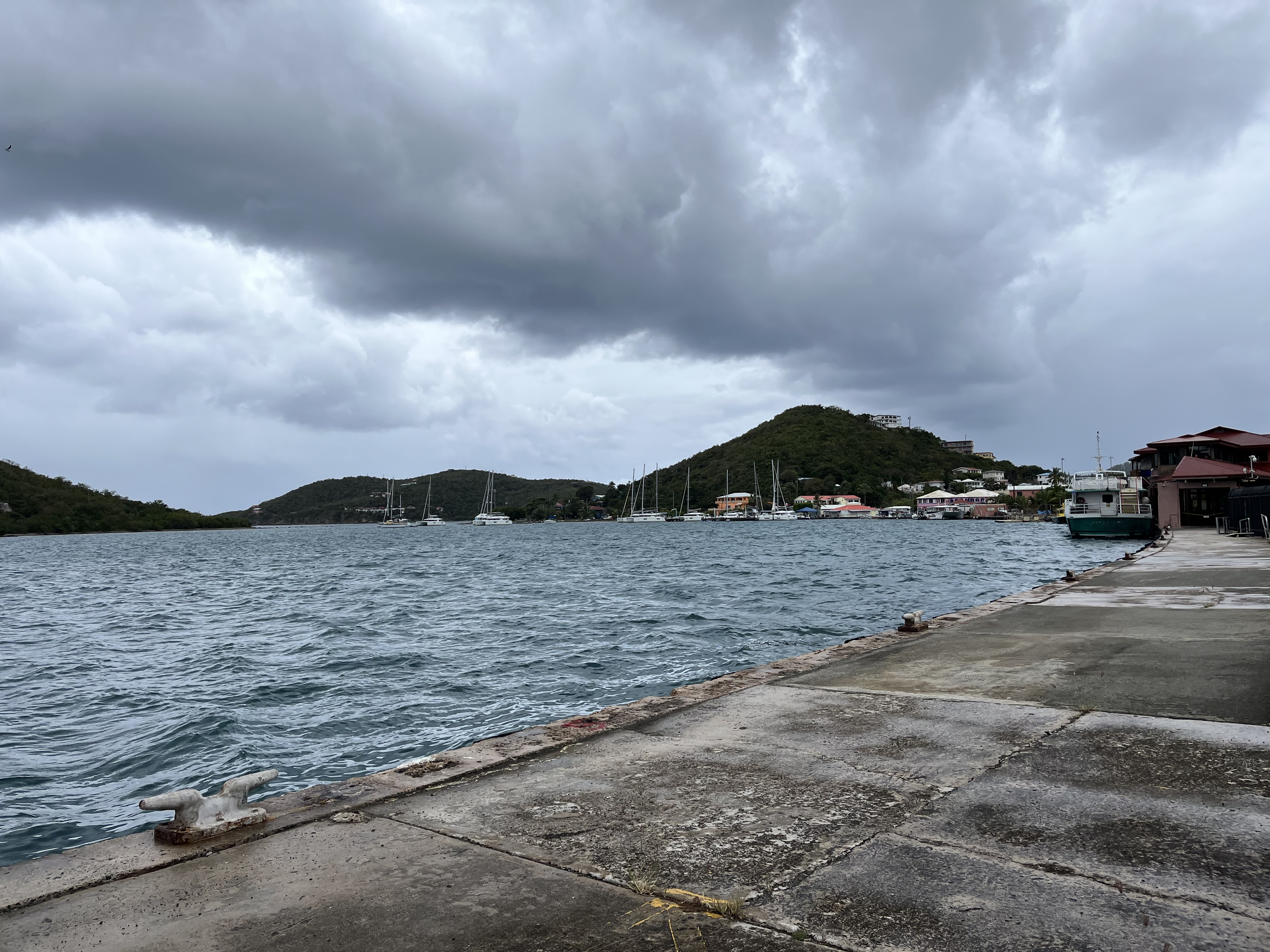
- IATA: SPB; ICAO: none; FAA LID: VI22

Summary
- Airport type: Private
- Owner: Virgin Islands Port Authority
- Location: Charlotte Amalie, St. Thomas, U.S. Virgin Islands
- Elevation AMSL: 0 ft (0 m)
- Coordinates: 18°20′19″N 064°56′27″W

Map
- Location in the Virgin Islands

Runways
| Direction | Length | | Surface |
| Direction | ft | m | Surface |
|---|---|---|---|
| E/W | 10,000 | 3,048 | Water |
| N/S | 4,000 | 1,219 | Water |

Statistics (2005)
- Enplanements: 71,555
- Source: Federal Aviation Administration

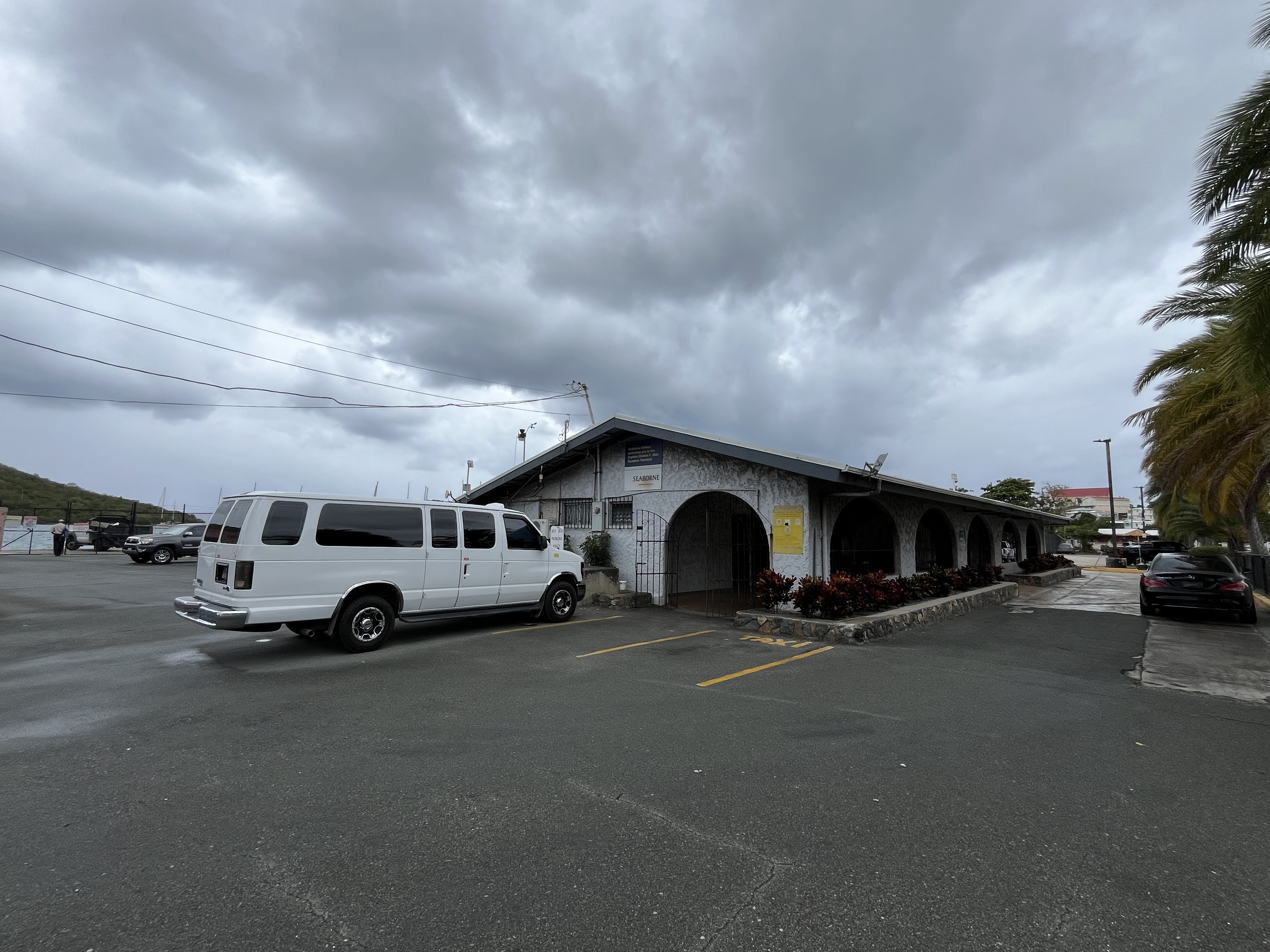
The terminal

Charlotte Amalie Harbor Seaplane Base (IATA: SPB, FAA LID: VI22), also known as St. Thomas Seaplane Base, is located in the harbor by Charlotte Amalie, Saint Thomas, U.S. Virgin Islands. This private-use airport is owned by the Virgin Islands Port Authority.

As per Federal Aviation Administration records, this seaplane base had 76,820 passenger boardings (enplanements) in calendar year 2004 and 71,555 enplanements in 2005.

== Facilities ==
Charlotte Amalie Harbor Seaplane Base covers an area of 3 acres (12,000 m^{2}) and has two seaplane landing areas:

- Runway E/W: 10,000 ft × 4,000 ft (3,048 m × 1,219 m), surface: water
- Runway N/S: 4,000 ft × 4,000 ft (1,219 m × 1,219 m), surface: water

=== Historical air service ===
Historically, Virgin Islands Seaplane Shuttle operated scheduled passenger service during the 1980s from the Charlotte Amalie seaplane base with Grumman Mallard aircraft. These Grumman amphibious aircraft were powered either by piston engines or by turboprop engines via a powerplant conversion program. During the 1970s, Antilles Air Boats operated several different types of seaplanes in scheduled passenger service from the harbor as well including the Consolidated PBY Catalina (Super Catalina version), Grumman Goose, Grumman Mallard, Short Sandringham S-25 and Vought Sikorsky VS-44.

== Renaming the seaplane terminal ==
The terminal was named the Charles F. Blair, Jr. terminal in honor of Charles F. Blair, Jr., an aviation pioneer and the founder of the seaplane airline, Antilles Air Boats.
