= Georges P. Vanier Secondary School =

Coordinates: 49°42′35.28″N 124°59′56.12″W

Georges P. Vanier Secondary

Location
- 4830 Headquarters Road; Courtenay, British Columbia, V9N 5N5; Canada

Information
- School type: Public, high school
- School board: School District 71 Comox Valley
- School number: 7171040
- Principal: Karma Taiji
- Grades: 8-12
- Website: gpvanier.ca

Georges P. Vanier Secondary School is a high school in Courtenay, British Columbia, Canada. The school was named after Georges P. Vanier, one of Canada's most popular Governors General.

== History ==
The school opened in January 1968, completing a move of students from the old Courtenay Senior High School. Vanier was built to have a capacity of 1200 students. The school population grew to more than 1700 in the early 2000s, with the addition of 36 portable classrooms. This led to the opening of Mark R. Isfeld Senior Secondary School, which became the third district secondary school in the early 2000s.

Vanier has primarily been the regional secondary school in the Comox Valley School District, serving students from Hornby and Denman Islands, the City of Courtenay, and the communities of Dove Creek, Merville, Black Creek, Saratoga and Miracle Beach communities up to the Oyster River, which separates the Comox Valley School District from the Campbell River district.

In 2016, the school started a $33.8 million upgrade.

== Facilities ==
The school facility has a natural setting on 96 acres (390,000 m^{2}) located next to the Comox Valley Sports Centre, community track and playing fields. The grounds include three playing fields and access to a community all-weather field and a community daycare primarily built for teen mothers. The school includes the Vanier Studio Theatre, a full teaching cafeteria, and a large technology education wing that includes shops for house construction, auto mechanics, small engines, metalworking, electronics/robotics, woodwork and drafting.

== International exchange ==
Vanier has established links with four sister schools, one in Italy, one in Wales and two in Japan.

== Athletics ==
Georges P. Vanier Secondary competes in Zone E (Vancouver Island) of BC School Sports. The sports teams are:

=== Fall ===
- Volleyball (Boys and Girls)
- Cross Country
- Swimming
- Soccer (Senior Boys)

=== Winter ===
- Basketball (Boys and Girls)
- Gymnastics
- Wrestling
- Ski and Snowboarding

=== Spring ===
- Track and Field
- Mountain Biking
- Soccer (Senior Girls)
- Rugby (Boys and Girls)
- Golf
- Ultimate Frisbee

The school won the BC provincial championships in senior girls' rugby in 2018-2019.

== National Championships ==
- Robotics, 2004, 2010
- Robotics World Championships, 2010
- Improv, 2009, 2010
- Improv, Destination Imagination Global Championships, 2018

== Notable alumni ==
- Kim Cattrall, actress
- Colin Hansen, BC finance minister
- Barry Pepper, actor
- Simon Nessman, model
- Cameron Levins, Olympian
- Geoff Kabush, Olympian
