= Mount Geoffrey Escarpment Provincial Park =

Provincial park in British Columbia, Canada

- IUCN category III (natural monument or feature)
- Location within British Columbia Location within Comox Valley Regional District
- Interactive map of Mount Geoffrey Escarpment Provincial Park
- Location: Hornby Island, British Columbia, Canada
- Nearest city: Courtenay
- Coordinates: 49°30′25″N 124°41′4″W
- Area: 187 hectares (460 acres)
- Established: May 17, 2004
- Governing body: BC Parks
- Website: BC Parks Mount Geoffrey

Mount Geoffrey Escarpment Provincial Park is a Class-A provincial park in British Columbia, Canada, located on the southwest coast of Hornby Island. It covers an area of 187 hectares (460 acres), stretching from the Shingle Spit ferry landing in the west to Ford Cove in the east.

There are facilities for hiking, mountain biking, canoeing, fishing, sightseeing, open water swimming, and horseback riding.

== See also ==
- Helliwell Provincial Park
- Mount Geoffrey Regional Nature Park
- Tribune Bay Provincial Park
