= Mark Isfeld =

Canadian Army soldier

Mark Robert Isfeld
- Born: August 14, 1962; Zweibrücken, West Germany
- Died: 21 June 1994 (aged 31); Kakma, Republic of Croatia
- Burial place: Little Mountain Royal Canadian Legion Cemetery, Chilliwack, British Columbia, Canada
- Military career
- Allegiance: Canada
- Branch: Canadian Army
- Service years: 1986–1994
- Rank: Master Corporal
- Nickname: Izzy
- Service number: A71248738
- Unit: 1st Combat Engineer Regiment
- Conflicts: Gulf War (UNIKOM) Yugoslav Wars (UNPROFOR)
- Awards: Canadian Peacekeeping Service Medal; United Nations Iraq-Kuwait Observer Mission Medal; United Nations Protection Force Medal; Dag Hammarskjöld Medal

Master Corporal Mark Robert Isfeld (August 14, 1962 – June 21, 1994) was a Canadian soldier and United Nations peacekeeper who served in UNIKOM and UNPROFOR as a combat engineer. He was killed by a landmine while on tour in Croatia. He is best known for handing out small knitted dolls, known as "Izzy Dolls", to children in need while on duty.

== Early life ==
Isfeld was born in Zweibrücken, West Germany, to Brian and Carol Isfeld. He graduated from the School of Military Engineering in Chilliwack, BC. He joined the Canadian Armed Forces on May 22, 1986.

== Military career ==
Isfeld first served in UNIKOM from April to October 1991. He then served in UNPROFOR from October 1992 to April 1993. During this tour, Isfeld had noticed a doll lying on a pile of rubble. He took a picture of the doll and sent it to his mother, who began to crochet small woolen dolls for Isfeld to distribute to the local children. These dolls were nicknamed "Izzy Dolls" by his unit. He then served in UNPROFOR again, from April to June 1994. It was on this tour that he was killed while disarming a landmine, in the village of Kakma.

== Legacy ==
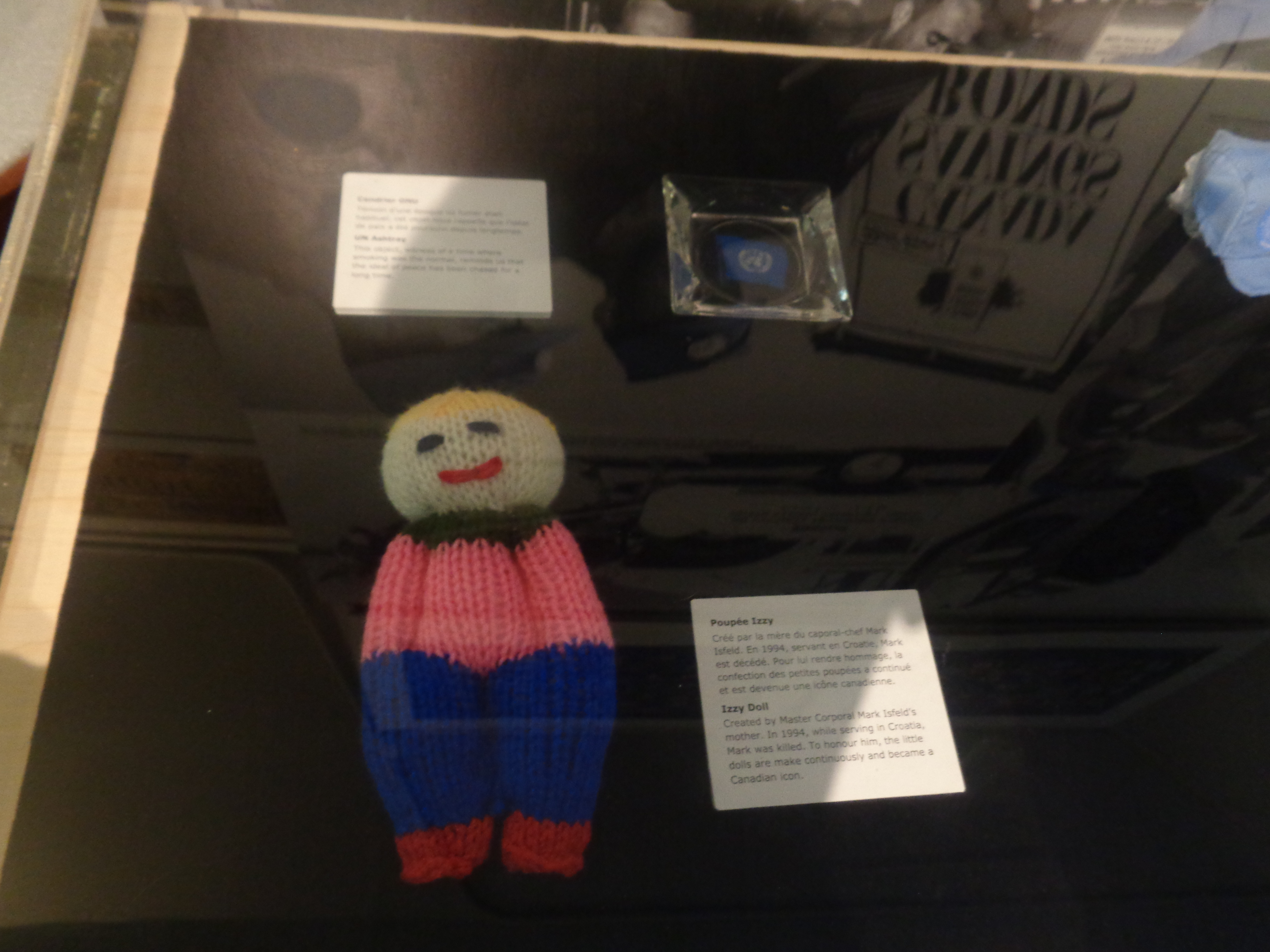
An "Izzy Doll" in the Canadian Forces Logistics Museum in Montreal.

After Isfeld's death, his mother continued to send Izzy Dolls to the Canadian Armed Forces for distribution to children in conflict zones. Friends and relatives of Carol Isfeld began to contribute Izzy Dolls as well. The pattern for the Izzy Doll was published online, so that anyone could make and send them. Various charities and organizations began to handle distribution, such as ICROSS, Health Partners International of Canada, and the Canadian Military Engineers Association. After Carol and Brian Isfeld's death, the Isfeld family agreed to let Shirley O'Connell coordinate distribution. As of November 2024, Lise Galuga is the Executive Director of the Izzy Doll Initiative and works on behalf of the Isfeld family to keep Mark's memorial project strong. To date, over 2 million Izzy Dolls have been given out in Mark's name around the world.

Courtenay Junior Middle School in Courtenay, B.C. was renamed Mark R. Isfeld Senior Secondary School in October 2001.

A statue of Isfeld stands in Peacekeeper Park, located in Calgary, Alberta.
