= School District 71 Comox Valley =

School district in British Columbia, Canada

School District 71 Comox Valley Comox Valley Schools

Address
- 2488 Idiens Way Comox, Courtenay, Cumberland, Comox Valley Areas A, B and C; Denman Island, Hornby Island Courtenay, British Columbia, V9N 7G5; Canada

District information
- Established: July 30, 1870
- Superintendent: Jeremy Morrow
- Schools: 23
- Budget: CA$130 million

Students and staff
- Students: 8600
- Faculty: 1600

Other information
- Website: www.sd71.bc.ca

School District 71 Comox Valley is a school district on Vancouver Island in British Columbia, Canada. This includes the communities of Courtenay, Comox and Cumberland as well as the surrounding rural areas and the adjacent islands of Denman and Hornby.

== History ==
The Comox Valley has a rich history of settlement, industrial development, and community growth. School District 71 developed alongside this local history, operating schools to meet the needs of the Comox Valley community since the late nineteenth century.

The Comox School District was formed on July 30, 1870 while the area was still part of the Colony of Vancouver Island. This new school district provided the legal foundation for the Comox North School which was the Comox Valley's first official public school. Over the next decades, settlement in the region continued to expand and a number of new schools were established.

School District 71 was formally created in 1946 and currently spans from Miracle Beach in the north to Denman and Hornby Islands in the south. Until 1946, individual schools in British Columbia operated with their own set of trustees and governance structures under the provincial government. A number of local school districts existed in the area that School District 71 now covers.

The school district now operates a number of schools with a variety of programs including French Immersion, trades and career training, Montessori, distributed learning, and Indigenous education programs.

== Elected Board of Education (2018-2022) ==
The school board is composed of seven trustees representing the urban and rural areas of the school district. They are elected officials.

- Sheila McDonnell, Board Chair, Area A (Baynes Sound, Hornby & Denman Islands)
- Michelle Waite, Vice Chair, Area B (Lazo North)
- Tonia Frawley, Town of Comox
- Janice Caton, City of Courtenay
- Kat Hawksby, City of Courtenay
- Sarah Jane Howe, Village of Cumberland
- Cristi May Sacht, Area C (Puntledge - Black Creek)

== Grade Structure (2018-2019) ==
- Elementary Schools (15):
  - K-5 (2)
  - K-6 (1)
  - K-7 (11)
  - K-9 (1)
- Middle School (1):
  - 6-9
- Secondary Schools (3):
  - 7-12 (1)
  - 8-12 (2)
- Alternate Schools (2):
  - 7-12 (1) - Glacier View Secondary Centre/Sandwick Technical School
  - 10-12 (1) - Nala'atsi Alternate School
- Distributed Learning (1):
  - K-12 (1) - North island Distance Education

== Current schools ==
A list of school sites currently operating in the Comox Valley.
School	Opened	Location	Grades	History and Programs
Airport Elementary School	1954	Lazo	K-7	Opened in 1954 as Comox Airport School to accommodate children at CFB Comox. Additions were built in 1956 adding a gymnasium and classrooms. Additional classrooms and a library were added in 1959. More classrooms were added in 1971. The school property was owned and maintained by the Department of National Defense while instruction was provided by School District 71. Airport Elementary School continues to serve the community of CFB Comox and Lazo and is now fully maintained and staffed by School District 71.
Arden Elementary School	1962	Courtenay	K-5	Opened in 1962 to serve the families of the Arden area where development and settlement were rapidly increasing.
Aspen Park Elementary School	2009	Comox	K-7	Formerly Aspen Park Middle School. Renamed as part of district restructuring and the phasing out of middle schools. (See Aspen Park Middle School)
Brooklyn Elementary School (Lazo Campus)	2012	Comox	K-7	Opened in 1962 at the Noel Avenue campus. Completed a move to the former Cape Lazo Middle School campus in 2012 where it operates as an elementary school. (See Brooklyn Elementary School - Noel Campus)
Courtenay Elementary School	1960	Courtenay	K-5	Opened in 1953 as Courtenay West School to replace Courtenay Central School. Operated as Courtenay West School for a brief period while Courtenay Central School was still in operation. When the Courtenay Central School was closed and the land sold, the funds from the sale were used to expand the Courtenay West School. The school was renamed Courtenay Elementary School and continues to operate in the same location on McPhee Avenue. It recently underwent significant seismic upgrades. (See Courtenay School, Courtenay Central School, and Courtenay West School)
Cumberland Community School Campus	2013	Cumberland	K-9	The Cumberland Community School operates out of the Cumberland Junior School (Beaufort Building) and Cumberland Elementary School (Salish Building). The School District acquired the former Cumberland Medical Clinic on Ulverston Avenue to be used as a learning centre and library space for both schools (Perseverance Building). All three buildings make up the Cumberland Community School Campus which began operating as one school in 2013. The Cumberland Community Schools Society also operates out of the campus which provides community guidance and leadership. In 2019, the school district noted a significant increase in enrollment in the school which had previously been low. They projected that by 2021 the school would be at or exceeding capacity.
Denman Island Community School	1878	Denman Island	K-7	Opened by the settlers of Denman Island in 1878 as a single-room school a few hundred meters east of the current fire department land on Denman Road. In 1896, a second school was built on the site to replace the first. A bigger school was built in 1912 on the adjoining plot of land to accommodate a growing population on the island. This 1912 building stands today. Denman Island School opened in a new facility on Northwest Road across from the intersection of Kirk Road. The school now operates as Denman Island Community School with the Denman Island Community Education Society providing community guidance and leadership.
École Puntledge Park Elementary School	1964	Courtenay	K-7	Opened in 1964 as a four-room school to serve the growing population in North-West Courtenay. The school continued to grow and additions were completed in the following years. The school now houses French Immersion programs for elementary students.
École Robb Road Elementary	1953	Comox	K-7	Built in 1953 as a two-room school annex housing students from Comox Elementary. Robb road junior Secondary was built in 1957 next to the annex. Additions in 1959, 1969, and 1972 saw the addition of shops, home economics spaces, and activity rooms. More classrooms, science labs, and a band room were added in 1973. Significant seismic upgrades were completed at the school between 2006 and 2008. The School now houses an elementary French Immersion program.
Georges P. Vanier Secondary School	1968	Courtenay	8-12	The school opened in January 1968, completing a move of students from the old Courtenay Senior High School. Vanier was built to have a capacity of 1200 students. The school population grew to more than 1700 in the early 2000s, with the addition of 36 portable classrooms. Mark R. Isfeld Secondary was opened at the former Courtenay Junior Middle School to alleviate overcrowding at Georges P. Vanier Secondary School in 2001. Extensive renovations and seismic upgrades were completed at the school in 2018.
Glacier View Secondary Centre		Courtenay	8-12	
Highland Secondary School	1978	Comox	8-12	Built to accommodate 700 students at the secondary level as the Comox peninsula grew in population.
Hornby Island Community School		Hornby Island	K-7	Operates as a community school. Suffered a devastating fire on August 26, 2018. Students are hosted in local community spaces until repairs are completed. A new, 85-seat school is expected to be complete by the Fall of 2022.
Huband Park Elementary School		Courtenay	K-7	
Lake Trail Middle School	1955	Courtenay	6-9	Built in 1955 as a two- story, eight-room elementary school to serve the growing population in the Lake Trail area. In 1957 the school was renamed Lake Trail Junior Secondary School to serve an aging school population in the area. A gym and additional classroom space were added in 1999. Seismic upgrades, a significant redesign, and a large addition were approved and started in the summer of 2019. The school continues to operate as a middle school with a vibrant community.
Mark R. Isfeld Secondary School	2001	Courtenay	7-12	Opened in 1991 as Courtenay Junior Middle School. Converted to a Secondary School in 2001 to alleviate crowding at G.P. Vanier Secondary and was renamed as Mark R. Isfeld Secondary School.
Miracle Beach Elementary School	1983	Black Creek	K-7	
Nala`atsi Alternate School (Secondary)		Courtenay	10-12	
Navigate - NIDES (North Island Distance Education School)	1989	Grantham	K-12	Opened in 1989, NIDES offers blended learning options for students across Central and Northern Vancouver Island. They operate satellite schools in Nanaimo and Qualicum Beach, Independent Learning Centres in all three Comox Valley high schools, and the ENTER labs at Aspen Park Elementary and Highland Secondary. They offer K-9 blended programs, high school courses, adult education, Aboriginal, and special education programming. In addition, they offer a large selection of international language programs. While the school operates satellite campuses in other Vancouver Island districts, all of their administrative, teaching, and support staff are employees of School District 71. The school's main campus is their Tsolum Campus, located in the former Tsolum Elementary School facility.
Queneesh Elementary School	2008	Courtenay	K-7	Opened as Courtenay Middle School. Renamed Queneesh Elementary School in September 2008 as part of district restructuring and the phasing out of middle schools.
Royston Elementary School	1916	Royston	K-6	
Sandwick Technical School (Sandwick School/Puntledge School)	1892	Courtenay	7-12	Opened to serve the farmers of the Sandwick area along the Tsolum River as Puntledge School. The school was located on land donated by William Harmston at the corner of Rennison Road and Headquarters Road. While the school was known as Puntledge School by the provincial government, local families knew the school as Sandwick School. The name was officially changed in 1906 to reflect the local identity. A second building was built in 1912 on the site next to the original building. The original building was then sold and moved to local family lot. A more recent building sits next to that school building which still stands. The School District now operates trades training programs in both of the buildings at the site as a division of Glacier View Secondary Centre.
Valley View Elementary School		Courtenay	K-7	

== Former Schools ==
A list of schools opened, operated, and now closed in the Comox Valley.
School	Opened	Closed	Location	Grades	History
Aspen Park Middle School	2000	2009	Comox	7-9	Built in 2000. Closed as a middle school as part of district restructuring and the phasing out of middle schools in 2009. Opened as Aspen Park Elementary School. (See Aspen Park Elementary School)
Bevan School	1913	1957	Bevan		Was located in the former Bevan mining settlement where the Wellington No. 7 Mine operated. Opened as a two-room school in 1913 to serve the mine families of Bevan near the Puntledge River. The school operated in conjunction with the Puntledge Townsite School for a number of years. The mine closed in 1921 but the school continued to operate until 1946. The school was closed briefly between 1946 and 1948. However, it reopened and continued until its final closure and demolition in 1957.
Black Creek School (Oyster River School)	1924		Black Creek		Opened in Oyster River in 1924 as Oyster River School to serve the logging community of the Comox Logging and Railway Company. The single-room school was located near Catherwood Road and the Island Highway. The school was moved to a location on the Oyster River in 1929 as the logging operation moved slightly. As of 1934, Mennonite children from Black Creek to the south were attending the school by bus. The logging operations ceased and the school was moved using horses to a location north of Ployart Road in Black Creek where additional space was added. By 1950, the school was in need of repair and was closed for a short time before reopening again. The school was renamed in 1950 to become Black Creek School. The most recent building opened in 1958 and was located on Ployart Road less than a half mile from the previous site. The school grew over the next decades and saw the addition of permanent and portable classrooms. The school is now closed.
Brooklyn Elementary School (Noel Campus)	1962	2011	Comox	K-4	Opened to alleviate overcrowding at Comox Elementary. Additions were made in 1966 and 1967. Portable classrooms were added in 1977 to ease overcrowding until major renovations could be completed. Brooklyn Elementary completed a move to the former Cape Lazo Middle School campus in 2012. The Noel Avenue site was sold in 2014 to Phil & Jennie Gaglardi Academy which was previously known as Comox Valley Christian School (2008-2012) and Gateway Academy (2012-2014).
Cape Lazo Middle School	2000	2009	Comox	K-7	Closed as a middle school in 2009 as part of district restructuring and the phasing out of middle schools. Leased to various private school programs and used by Brooklyn Elementary School intermediate students until 2011. Brooklyn Elementary School officially moved all programs to the Lazo Campus from its Noel Avenue campus to form the current Brooklyn Elementary School in 2012. (See Brooklyn Elementary School)
Comox Elementary (Comox Consolidated School)	1913	2008	Comox	K-7	Opened in 1913 to replace Comox South School. Briefly renamed Comox Consolidated School between 1927 and 1930 with the closure of the schools at Lazo and Nob Hill. In 1930, the Comox High School building was opened on the property and the elementary school was once again called Comox Elementary School. Comox Elementary School continued until it was closed in 2008 as part of district catchment restructuring. The land and building were subsequently leased to Comox Valley Christian School in 2009. The building and land are now used by School District 71 for operations purposes. Four classrooms are also leased to the Dream Canada International Korean ESL program.
Comox High School	1930	1952	Comox		Built in 1930 on the property of the Comox Consolidated School (See Comox Elementary School). The school grounds housed the Comox Elementary School and new Comox High School. The high school closed in 1952 and students were bused to Courtenay. Comox Elementary School remained at the site.
Comox North School (Mission Hill School)	1873	1896	Courtenay		Built and opened in 1873 on donated Mission Hill church property. The school served students from Little River, Lazo, Comox Bay, and the banks of the Courtenay and Tsolum rivers. It closed in 1896 as enrollment dropped and students were transferred to Comox South School and Sandwick School. The building was demolished and the materials recycled to construct a barn on Mission Hill.
Comox South School	1884	1913	Comox		Opened to serve children from the Comox peninsula and Little River area as the trek to Comox North School was long and difficult given local seasonal weather. The school was a single-room school house located one mile north of Comox Road on Anderton Road. The first decade of the twentieth century saw fluctuations in enrollment as Lazo School and Nob Hill School were opened to accommodate growing populations in the Little River, Lazo, and Nob Hill areas. The school closed in 1913 with the opening of Comox Elementary School.
Courtenay Junior Middle School	1991	2001	Courtenay	7-9	Built and opened in 1991 as a junior middle school. Converted to a Secondary School in 2001 a to alleviate overcrowding at Highland Secondary and G.P. Vanier Secondary. Renamed Mark R. Isfeld Secondary School. (See Mark. R. Isfeld Secondary School)
Courtenay Central School	1921	1960	Courtenay		Opened as Courtenay Central School in 1921 to replace the old Courtenay School. The school was located on England Avenue near 6th Street, across from the current Provincial Courthouse. The school was slightly damaged by an earthquake on June 23, 1946. Courtenay West School (now Courtenay Elementary) opened in 1953 and the two overlapped in their operation for a few years. Courtenay Central was demolished in June 1960 and the land was sold to build a grocery store. The funds were used to upgrade Courtenay West School. (See Courtenay West School)
Courtenay High School	1915	1968	Courtenay		Opened in the basement of the Presbyterian Church briefly before moving to the Builders Supply on 5th Street at England Avenue. Between 1921 and 1927, the school had been moved to the upstairs of Courtenay Central School. In 1927, Courtenay High School opened on Harmston Avenue at 6th Street next to the current School Board offices. Over the next decades, the school facilities and population grew substantially, filling the property. G.P. Vanier Secondary opened in 1968 and a number of students were transferred from Courtenay High. The school was then referred to as Courtenay Junior-Senior High and then Courtenay Junior Secondary. (See Georges P. Vanier Secondary School and Courtenay Junior Secondary School)
Courtenay Junior Secondary School	1968		Courtenay		Operated in the Courtenay High School building after senior students were transferred to Georges P. Vanier Secondary. The school continued to operate and flourish for the next few decades.
Courtenay Middle School	2000	2008	Courtenay	7-9	Closed as a middle school and renamed Queneesh Elementary School in September 2008 as part of district restructuring and the phasing out of middle schools. (See Queneesh Elementary School)
Courtenay School	1885	1921	Courtenay		Opened on land donated by Joseph McPhee near Cliffe Avenue and 6th Street. Classes were held in the Agricultural Hall, where the current Courtenay Recreation Lewis Centre stands, while the school was built. In 1908, staff and students moved to a two-room schoolhouse that was built where the Courtenay Central School later stood as of 1921. (See Courtenay Central School)
Courtenay West School	1953	1960	Courtenay		Overcrowding at Courtenay Central School caused the construction and opening of Courtenay West School in 1953 on McPhee Avenue where Courtenay Elementary School still operates. The Courtenay Central School closed around 1960 and the land was sold which funded additions to the Courtenay West School. The Closure of Courtenay Central School caused the Courtenay West School to be renamed Courtenay Elementary School. (See Courtenay Central School and Courtenay Elementary School)
Cumberland Elementary School	1973	2013	Cumberland	K-6	Opened in 1973 when the Cumberland School (Union Mine School) closed. The school eventually merged with Cumberland Junior School due to its dwindling student body. Although, population increases were projected and the decision was made to merge and form the Cumberland Community School in 2013. (See Cumberland Community School)
Cumberland High School	1902	1964	Cumberland		Originally held in what is now the community hall. The school moved into the Cumberland School (Union Mine School) in 1906 until a new school could be built in an adjacent lot in 1912. The School eventually became Cumberland Junior Secondary School. In 1964, the school was transferred to the new Cumberland Junior Secondary School. (See Cumberland Junior School)
Cumberland Junior School	1964	2013	Cumberland	7-9	Opened in 1963 when the Cumberland High School closed. The school continued as a Junior Secondary school and Junior School until it was merged with Cumberland Elementary School due to a dwindling student body. Although, population increases were projected and the decision was made to merge and form the Cumberland Community School in 2013. (See Cumberland Community School)
Cumberland School (Union Mine School)	1889	1973	Cumberland		Opened due to a rapid increase in Cumberland's population. Was located in the Camp area of West Cumberland. A "Cottage School" was also located at First Street and Dunsmuir Avenue for use by the school. The school grew over time and in 1898, land at the corner of First Street and Dunsmuir Avenue was cleared for a new school. In 1900, the new site opened and was renamed Cumberland School. The Cottage School was also in use at this time. Cumberland High School was moved to the top floor in 1906 (See Cumberland High School). The population of the school dropped between 1942 and 1947 with the internment of Japanese Canadians. By 1950, the old building was showing its age and a replacement was badly needed. It wasn't until 1964 that the Cumberland Junior School was constructed to for high school students. The elementary students remained until 1973 when Cumberland Elementary School was opened. (See Cumberland Elementary School and Cumberland Junior School)
Dove Creek School	1924	1964	Dove Creek		Opened in 1924 following the fire at Isaac Parkin's Nikrap School. The single-room school house was located at the Junction of the Comox Logging Railroad and Dove Creek Road. After consolidation at Tsolum in 1926, only elementary classes were held at Dove Creek School. Classes ended in 1964 and students were transferred to Tsolum.
Grantham School	1894	1927	Grantham		Opened prior to 1894 to serve the farmers of the Grantham area north of Courtenay. The school was located on property donated by Tom Beech near the Island Highway and Lever Road. Grantham School operated as a separate school until 1927 when Tsolum Consolidated Superior School was opened immediately across the highway.
Fanny Bay	1908	1968	Fanny Bay		Opened in 1908 to serve the growing population of Fanny Bay. The school was a single-room school on the north side of Coal Creek. A new school building was opened in 1913 about a quarter mile north of the old school. The school continued to grow with Japanese settlers attending the school. The school had a major fire in February 1957 and had to be rebuilt. Students attended Union Bay until a new school was completed late 1957. The local mill closed and in 1968, the school did too. The building was moved to Glacier View Elementary to house a kindergarten class and the remaining students were transferred to Union Bay School.
Glacier View Elementary School	1959	2008	Courtenay	K-6	Opened in as a three-room school in 1959 to serve a growing population at the base of what is now the Ryan Road hill. Additions were completed over the following decades to alleviate crowding. 1973 and 1974 saw a program for new Canadians held at the school. Glacier View Elementary School closed in 2008 as part of district restructuring. Students and staff moved to Queneesh Elementary School. The school was converted into the current 7–12 Glacier View Secondary Centre offering alternate programs. (See Glacier View Secondary Centre)
Headquarters School	1912	1958	Headquarters		Was located in the Headquarters logging town of the Comox Logging and Railway Company along the Tsolum River. The school closed in 1958 when logging operations moved to Courtenay.
Lazo School	1903	1930	Lazo		Opened to serve the farmers of the Little River and Lazo areas. The school was located near the current entrance to CFB Comox. The senior class began attending the Comox Consolidated School in 1927 and the remaining students were moved to Comox Consolidated School in 1930.
McGuigan School	1920	1942	Black Creek		Opened to serve the families of the Comox Logging and Railway Company at Old Camp III. The school was named after Superintendent of Logging, McGuigan. Old Camp III and the school burnt in 1922 but were rebuilt on Endall Road near Northy Lake as New Camp III. Another fire in 1936 which started near Campbell River caused the lumber stocks in the area to drop. The Company ceased operation in the area causing the school to close in 1942.
Merville School	1919	1940	Merville		Opened to serve the Merville community which was settled by veterans and farmers on land previously owned by the Comox Logging and Railway Company. The Prince of Whales visited the school for its opening on September 26, 1919. The Prince was to open the school with a silver key that had been accidental been locked inside the building. The key was retrieved and the ceremony took place. The Prince also planted acacia trees on either side of the school's driveway. The School closed in 1927 and students transferred to Tsolum Consolidated Superior School. However, crowding at Tsolum caused one room in Merville to be reopened in 1932. The school site officially closed in 1940.
Minto School	1902	1953	Minto		Opened as a result of increased farm settlement in the Minto area between Royston and Cumberland. The school site was located on the south-west corner of Ibbotson and Minto Roads. Minto School had doubled in size by 1913 and continued to grow as Japanese families came to work at the Royston lumber mill into the 1930s. The removal of Japanese settlers in 1942 during the second world war prompted the school's closure between 1944 and 1949. Minto School reopened briefly between 1949 and 1953. The school site was sold in 1957. The school had also served as a community centre, night school, and Sunday school.
Nikrap School	1910	1923	Dove Creek		Opened on the land of Isaac Parkin, a farmer in Dove Creek, to provide education services to his family and community. The school was located at the logging settlement, Camp 7. The school was named by reversing the spelling of Parkin's name. However, the school went inactive between 1911 and 1921 after logging families moved out of the area. However, soldiers and their families settled the area again and the school was reopened for one year in 1921. The Nikrap School burnt on December 22, 1923 following a Christmas party. A temporary school was established until the Dove Creek School could open in 1924.
Nob Hill School	1912	1927	Comox		Opened to serve the settlers in the Nob Hill area of Comox. The single-room school was located near Lazo Road in the area above Goose Spit known as Nob Hill. The school operated for roughly fifteen years until students were transferred to Comox Consolidated School.
Puntledge Townsite School	1919	1947	Puntledge Townsite		Built by the Canadian Collieries Dunsmuir Ltd. for the proposed No. 8 Mine (Puntledge Townsite). However, the mine never reached production and the school didn't open until 1919 when other industrial activity brought families to the area. The school operated in conjunction with the Bevan School. The Puntledge Townsite School closed in 1947. (See Bevan School)
Tsolum Elementary School (Tsolum Consolidated Superior School)	1927	2006	Grantham	K-6	Opened in 1927 to consolidate the Dove Creek, Sandwick, Grantham, Merville, and Headquarters schools and provide those students with secondary level education without traveling far from home. Tsolum has a rich history as it grew over the following decades. Eventually, Tsolum School was renamed Tsolum Elementary School and ceased to offer programs for junior, middle, and secondary students. The school closed in 2006 and the site was converted for use by the current K–12 Navigate - NIDES (North Island Distance Education School). Students were redirected to Airport Elementary, Huband Park Elementary, and Miracle Beach Elementary. The Merville centennial was held in 2019 and the search old school bell was initiated. It has yet to be found. (See North Island Distance Education School)
Union Bay Elementary School (Union Wharf School)	1897	2006	Union Bay	K-6	Opened to serve the growing Union Bay area in 1897. The school began as a small building and grew to its current size by the 1950s. The school closed due to dwindling number of students in 2006. Remaining students and faculty merged into Royston Elementary School. The school building and site are maintained by School District 71 but do not operate any educational programs.
Village Park Elementary	1968	2008	Comox	K-6	Opened in 1968. The school was an open-area complex with six classrooms. Additions were built in 1970 and 1978. Closed in 2008 as part of district catchment restructuring. Land sold to SD93 for construction of new École au Coeur-de-l'ile.

== Surplus Property ==
Surplus property listed in the Long range Facilities Plan, 2018-2027.
Property	Location	Notes
Atlas Road Site	Comox	5 acre property reserved for future development.
Comox Elementary Site	Comox	School closed and four classrooms leased to Dream Canada International Korean ESL program.
Harmston Park	Courtenay	In the process of disposal.
Sandwick Technical School	Courtenay	Part of Glacier View Secondary Centre.
Union Bay School Site	Union Bay	School closed and no tenants.

== See also ==
- List of school districts in British Columbia
