= Pearl Lake (Vancouver Island) =

- Location within Vancouver Island
- Location: Vancouver Island, British Columbia
- Coordinates: 49°42′00″N 125°29′00″W
- Lake type: Natural lake
- Basin countries: Canada

Pearl Lake is a lake located on Vancouver Island is an expansion of Oyster River near head and east of Buttle Lake.

== See also ==
- List of lakes of British Columbia
