= Kitty Coleman Provincial Park =

Provincial park in British Columbia, Canada

Kitty Coleman Beach Provincial Park
- IUCN category II (national park)
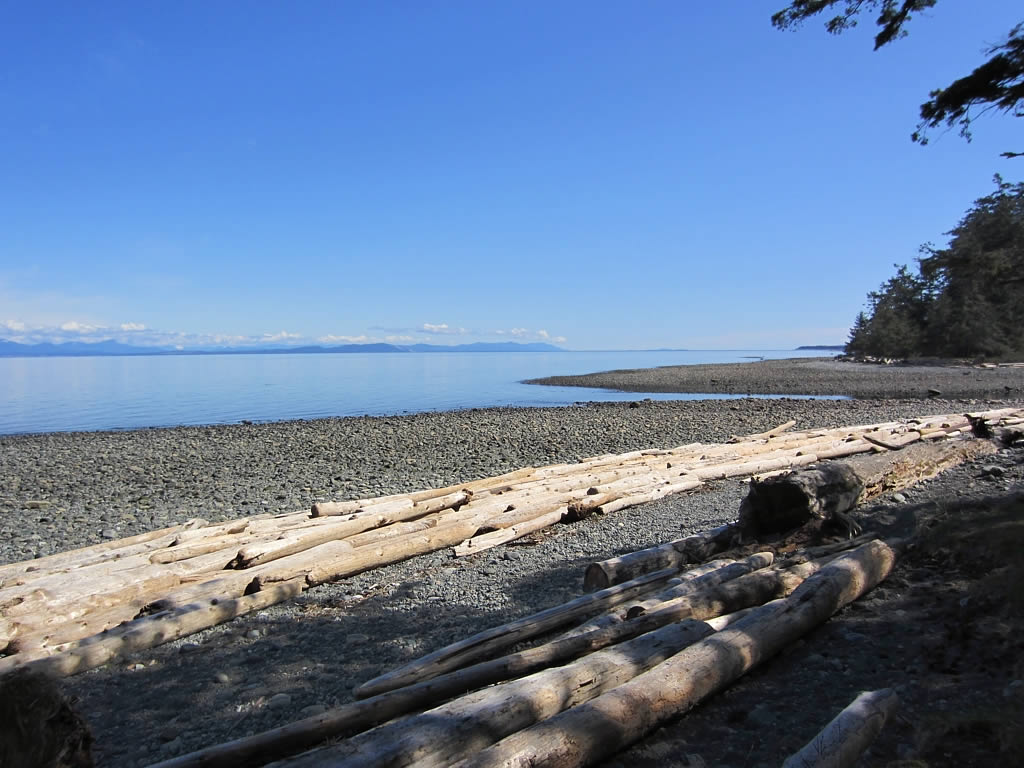
- Strait of Georgia at Kitty Coleman Beach Provincial Park

- Location within British Columbia Location within Comox Valley Regional District
- Interactive map of Kitty Coleman Beach Provincial Park
- Location: Comox Valley, British Columbia, Canada
- Nearest city: Courtenay
- Coordinates: 49°47′20″N 124°59′46″W
- Area: 10 ha (25 acres)
- Designation: Class C Provincial Park
- Established: November 14, 1944
- Governing body: BC Parks
- Website: Kitty Coleman Beach Provincial Park

Kitty Coleman Provincial Park, also known as Kitty Coleman Beach Provincial Park, is a Class C provincial park located in British Columbia, Canada. It is located on Vancouver Island, in the Comox Valley, south of the mouth of the Oyster River just northeast of Courtenay.

Unlike most provincial parks, it is a Class 'C' provincial park, meaning it is run by a local community board. The beach is directly across from the sites and provides views of Powell River and the surrounding beaches across the water. There are only pit toilets available, and no hook-up or sani-station for motorhomes. It is approximately 0.1 km^{2} in area.

== History ==
The park was established on November 14, 1944 and was named after Kitty Coleman, a local First Nation member who left her tribe early to marry a white man.

== Flora and fauna ==
There are very tall Douglas Fir trees in the southern area. Wild onions also grow in the park.
