= Norm Lake =

- Location within Vancouver Island
- Location: Vancouver Island, British Columbia
- Coordinates: 49°43′00″N 125°27′00″W
- Lake type: Natural lake
- Basin countries: Canada

Norm Lake is a lake located on Vancouver Island and is an expansion of upper Oyster River, west of Courtenay.

== See also ==
- List of lakes of British Columbia
