= Mount Geoffrey Regional Nature Park =

Protected area in British Columbia, Canada

- IUCN category II (national park)
- Interactive map of Mount Geoffrey Regional Nature Park
- Location: Hornby Island, British Columbia, Canada
- Nearest city: Courtenay
- Coordinates: 49°31′6″N 124°41′3″W
- Area: 303 hectares (750 acres)
- Governing body: Comox Valley Regional District

Mount Geoffrey Regional Nature Park is regional park in British Columbia, Canada, located on Hornby Island. It covers an area of 303 hectares (750 acres), including the 330-metre (1,080 ft) summit of Mount Geoffrey, the highest point on the island.

There are facilities for hiking, mountain biking, and horseback riding.

== See also ==
- Mount Geoffrey Escarpment Provincial Park
- Tribune Bay Provincial Park
