= Fillongley Provincial Park =

Provincial park in British Columbia, Canada

- IUCN category II (national park)
- Location within British Columbia Location within Comox Valley Regional District
- Interactive map of Fillongley Provincial Park
- Location: Denman Island, British Columbia, Canada
- Coordinates: 49°32′38″N 124°45′45″W
- Area: 26 ha (64 acres)
- Established: January 19, 1954
- Governing body: BC Parks

Fillongley Provincial Park is a provincial park in British Columbia, Canada, located on the east side of Denman Island, southeast of Courtenay, British Columbia, and facing Georgia Strait.
