= Sid Williams Theatre =

Performance theatre in British Columbia, Canada

Coordinates: 49.69194°N 124.99727°W

The Sid Williams Theatre is a performance theatre in the Comox Valley, Canada. It is in downtown Courtenay, British Columbia. The theatre was first called 'The Gaiety Theatre' in the 1920s. It was then called 'The Bickle Theatre' in the 1930s. It was originally opened as a movie theatre. The stage of the Bickle Theatre was used for plays and musical events before it became an auction house. In 1998, the theatre closed for extensive renovations and earthquake upgrading. The current technical director is Patrick Emery; he has won numerous lighting design awards for his work with the Courtenay Little Theatre. The Sid Williams Theatre created The Blue Circle Series in 2019, a series of online and live concerts spanning from September to early June annually, showcasing professional talent from all over Canada. Blue is the colour of inspiration. The circle celebrates inclusion. It represents the infinite nature of energy. It symbolizes the cycles of time, and the movements of seasons. The circle is sacred to many cultures, and beckons the viewer to be drawn in, like a spotlight on stage.
