= Highland Secondary School (Comox, British Columbia) =

Highland Secondary

Location
- 750 Pritchard Rd; Comox, British Columbia, V9M 3S8; Canada; 49.6890°N 124.9157°W

Information
- School type: Public, high school
- Founded: 1978
- School board: School District 71 Comox Valley
- School number: 7171041
- Principal: Laura Roberts
- Vice-Principals: Wayne Kuhnert; Dave Miller
- Grades: 8-12
- Enrollment: 733 (2024)
- Language: English and French
- Colours: Gold, Blue
- Team name: Raiders
- Website: highlandsecondary.ca
- Last updated: December 20, 2024

Highland Secondary School is a secondary school located in Comox, British Columbia, Canada in School District 71. The school opened in 1978 and educates approximately 730 students annually in grades 8–12. The school's sports teams all go by the name of the Highland Raiders.

Students are separated into two school houses, which are colour-coded as gold and blue respectively. Each house has their own advisory system made up of groups whose names correspond to their colour and number (G-15, B-6, etc.). Students attend their Advisory Groups ("AG") on an at-need basis, such as prior to assemblies or certain events. Prior to the 2025-2026 academic year, AG would meet for 10 minutes a day, Monday through Thursday, after first block class.

== Notable alumni ==
- Pamela Anderson, actress
- Cassie Sharpe, athlete
- Jody Wilson-Raybould, politician
- Conner Molander, musician
- Dylan Phillips, musician
