= Mark R. Isfeld Senior Secondary School =

Mark R. Isfeld Senior Secondary

Location
- 1551 Lerwick Rd; Courtenay, British Columbia, V9N 9B5; Canada; 49°42′11″N 124°57′31″W

Information
- School type: Public, high school
- School board: School District 71 Comox Valley
- School number: 7171054
- Principal: Sean Lamoureux
- Grades: 8-12
- Language: English and French
- Colours: Blue and White
- Mascot: Spirit Bear
- Team name: Ice
- Website: www3.sd71.bc.ca/School/isfeldschool/Pages/default.aspx

Mark R. Isfeld Senior Secondary is a public high school in Courtenay, British Columbia, part of School District 71 Comox Valley.

== History ==
The school opened as Courtenay Junior Middle School in 1995, but was renamed in October 2001 in honor of Master Corporal Mark Robert Isfeld, a Canadian soldier killed in Croatia in 1994 while serving as peacekeeper. Isfeld was known for distributing small knitted dolls made by his mother to children he met during his tours of duty. It also became a high school, serving years 9 to 12. In the late 2000s this changed to 8–12 and an existing French immersion program moved to the school.

== Athletics ==
Mark R. Isfeld Senior Secondary competes in Zone E (Vancouver Island) of BC School Sports. The sports teams are:

=== Autumn ===
- Aquatics
- Field Hockey (girls' teams)
- Soccer (boys' teams)
- Volleyball (girls' and boys' teams)
- Cross Country Running

=== Winter ===
- Basketball (girls' and boys' teams)
- Ski & Snowboard Team
- Wrestling

The school won the BC provincial championships in girls' and combined snowboarding in 2009–10.

=== Spring ===
- Badminton
- Golf
- Rugby
- Soccer (girls' teams)
- Track and Field
- Ultimate Frisbee
- Mountain Bike Team

== Notable alumni ==
- Spencer O'Brien - Olympic/X Games Snowboarder
- Taylor Green - Former Milwaukee Brewers (Major League Baseball) player and scout
