= Royston, British Columbia =

Royston
- Location of Royston in British Columbia Royston (British Columbia)
- Coordinates: 49°38′45.2″N 124°56′46.9″W
- Country: Canada
- Province: British Columbia
- Regional District: Comox Valley
- Founded: 1890

Area
  - Total: 4.57 km^{2} (1.76 sq mi)

Population (2011)
  - Total: 1,562
  - Density: 342/km^{2} (885/sq mi)
- Time zone: UTC−07:00 (PT)
- Postal code: V0R 2V0
- Area codes: +250, +778

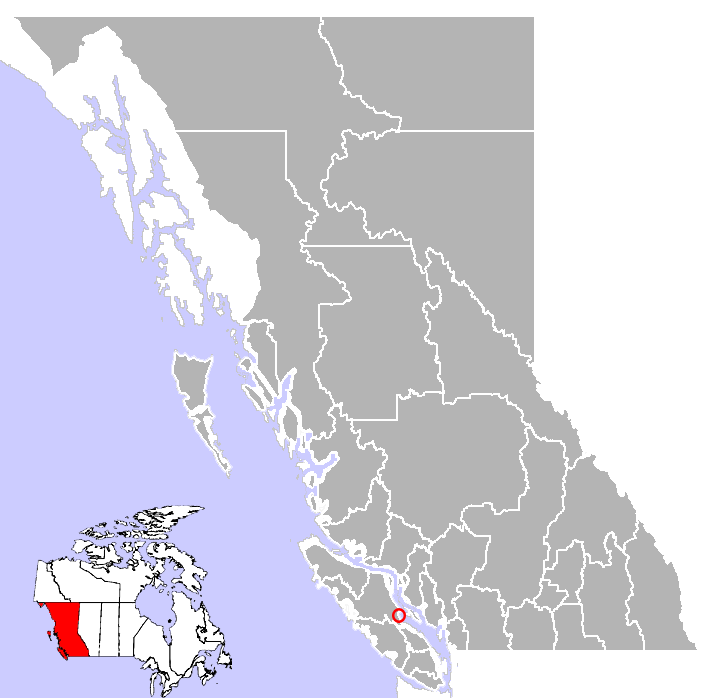
Location of Royston, British Columbia

Royston is an unincorporated community that is part of the greater Comox Valley region, 100 km northwest of Nanaimo on Vancouver Island, in British Columbia, Canada. With a population of just over 1,500, it is next to the Trent River, across the harbour from Comox, and lies on the southeast municipal boundary of Courtenay.

== History ==
Royston was the major port for the Comox Valley logging industry throughout the 20th century. Logs were shipped here by rail, boomed in the harbour, then towed across to the B.C. Mainland to be made into lumber.

William Roy and his family settled the area in 1890, collaborating with a real estate promoter named Frederick Warren to lay out a townsite that they named Royston. The settlement could have been named as "Roy's Town" but could also have been named after Warren's home town of Royston in Hertfordshire - or both.

Early settler William Roy was one of the first to clear land in Royston. Originally from Scotland, William came from Westville, Nova Scotia arriving in the Comox district in 1890. Although he was bound for Cumberland, on the ship that brought him up from Nanaimo he met James Dunsmuir. Dunsmuir owned large tracts of land and invited Roy to look around for an area he might like to buy. Roy decided on beach property that would now straddle both sides of Royston Road on the east side of the Island Highway and north of the Trent River. Roy with a real estate promoter named Frederick Warren created village lots in 1910. By 1912 Royston had 30 settlers. A rail line between Royston and Cumberland provided easy daily travel between the two settlements from 1914 to 1930. This service lead several Cumberland residents to build summer homes at Royston and Gartley beach on the south side of the Trent River.

Squatters moved into the area between Gartley beach and Millard Creek (now part of Courtenay) during the hard times of the 1912-1914 Cumberland mine workers strike.

Royston Imperial Pavilion was built in 1918 and covered in 1925. There was one single and four double tennis courts on the Royston waterfront that hosted numerous community events. As the orchestra warmed up for a summer evening dance in 1940 an electrical fire broke out bringing the pavilion to the ground in minutes, never to be replaced.

The Royston Community Club purchased the machine shop at the corner of the Island Highway and Royston Road in 1952 for a community hall. The building is now nearly 100 years old having been constructed in 1925.

Waterfront Oil Tanks & Wharf Shell and Imperial Oil took over the government wharf in 1940. The Royston wharf handled a heavy tonnage in oil products through the years. Initially barrels of oil were rolled to shore on the wharf. Fuel was later pumped from barges to tanks on the Royston waterfront. Oil tanks were located on the northwest corner of Royston Road and Marine Drive from 1916 until 1997. The wharf head was 12m x 30m (40 x 100 ft) with an approach that was just 1.1 m (3.6 ft) wide but 400 m (1,320 ft) long. The viewing stand at the end of Royston Road is built with timbers and decking from the wharf which was removed in 2003.
