= Taylor Green =

Canadian baseball player (born 1986)

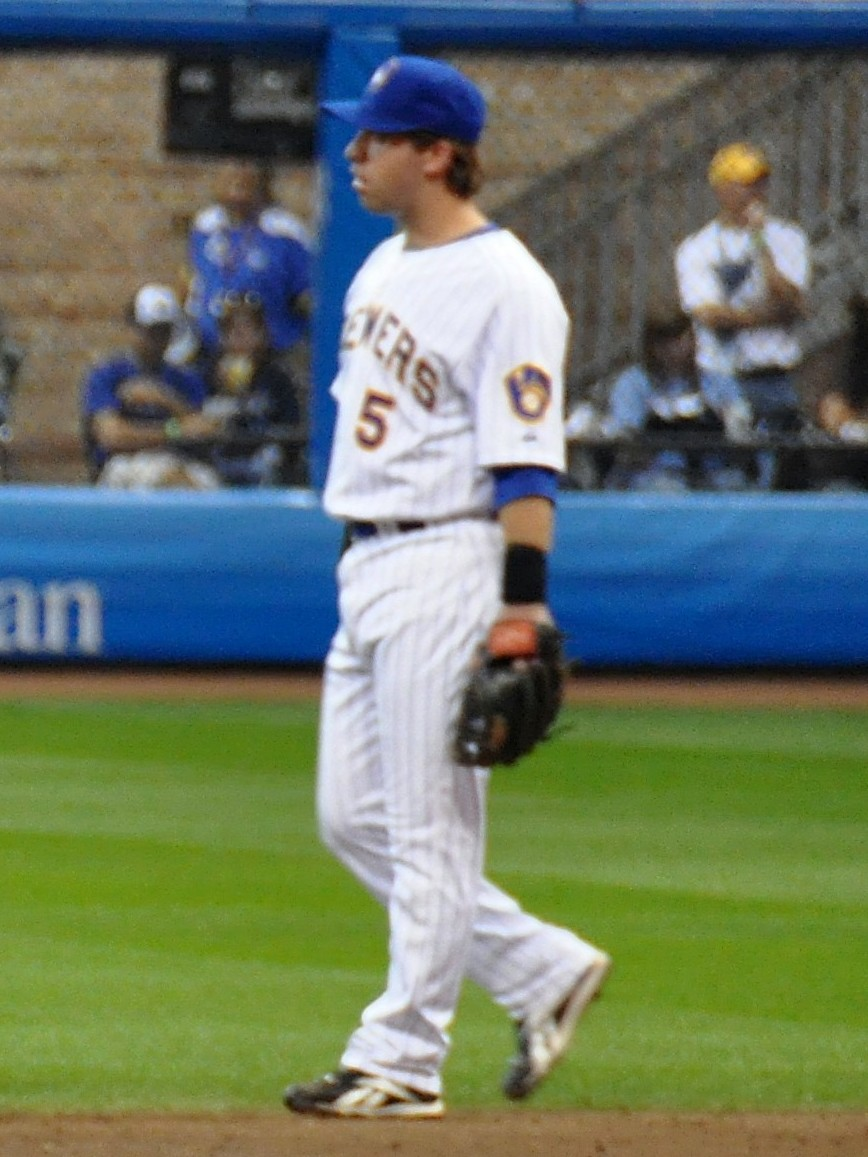
- Green with the Milwaukee Brewers in 2011
- Infielder
- Born: November 2, 1986 (age 40); Comox, British Columbia, Canada
- Batted: Left Threw: Right

MLB debut
- August 31, 2011, for the Milwaukee Brewers

Last MLB appearance
- October 3, 2012, for the Milwaukee Brewers

MLB statistics
- Batting average: .207
- Home runs: 3
- Runs batted in: 15
- Stats at Baseball Reference

Teams
- Milwaukee Brewers (2011–2012)

Taylor William Andrew Green (born November 2, 1986) is a Canadian former professional baseball infielder. He played in Major League Baseball (MLB) for the Milwaukee Brewers. After retiring, Green became a scout for the Brewers and is currently their Director of International Scouting and Player Personnel

== Amateur career ==
Green attended Mark R. Isfeld Senior Secondary School in Courtenay, British Columbia, and played high school baseball for the Parksville Royals of the British Columbia Premier Baseball League. He went on to play two years of collegiate baseball at Cypress College, where he was named a First Team Orange Empire Conference All-Star and Junior College 1st Team All-American.

== Professional career ==
Green was drafted by the Milwaukee Brewers in the 25th round (745th pick) of the 2005 Major League Baseball draft. He made his professional debut playing for the rookie-level Helena Brewers in 2006. Green was promoted to the Single-A West Virginia Power in 2007. That season, in which he had a .327 batting average, 14 home runs, and 86 RBI, Green was named the Brewers Organizational Player of the Year. He also made the mid and post-season South Atlantic League All-Star teams. Baseball America selected him as a "Low Class A Third Base All-Star".

After the 2007 season, Green was named to Team Canada's Baseball World Cup team which participated in the 2007 World Cup in Taipei, Taiwan, after which the team qualified for a spot in the 2008 Summer Olympics, although Green did not make the team. In 2008, Green played for the High-A Brevard County Manatees. He was selected for the mid and post-season Florida State League (FSL) All-Star teams, and finished second in the FSL Home Run Derby.

Green split the 2009 season between the Single-A Wisconsin Timber Rattlers and the Double-A Huntsville Stars. His entire 2010 season was played with Huntsville.

Green began the 2011 season with Huntsville, but was promoted to the Triple-A Nashville Sounds after three games at Double-A. He was later called up to the major leagues for the first time late in the season. Green made his MLB debut on August 31 as a pinch hitter, singling in his first at-bat for his first MLB career hit. In 37 at-bats, He batted .270.

Green competed for a roster spot with Brooks Conrad and Zelous Wheeler in spring training in 2012. He earned a spot on the 40-man roster, however was optioned to Triple-A Nashville before being recalled in May and hitting his first major league home run off Carlos Mármol in a win against the Chicago Cubs on June 6, 2012, then was later optioned back to Nashville, but recalled in September.

In April 2013, Green underwent left hip surgery and missed all of the 2013 season. He was outrighted off the Brewers roster on October 4, 2013, but rejoined the organization and played in the minors in 2014 (Huntsville and Nashville) and 2015 (Double-A Biloxi Shuckers).

Green retired as a player and became a Milwaukee scout on February 26, 2016.
