= Helliwell Provincial Park =

Provincial park in British Columbia, Canada

- IUCN category II (national park)
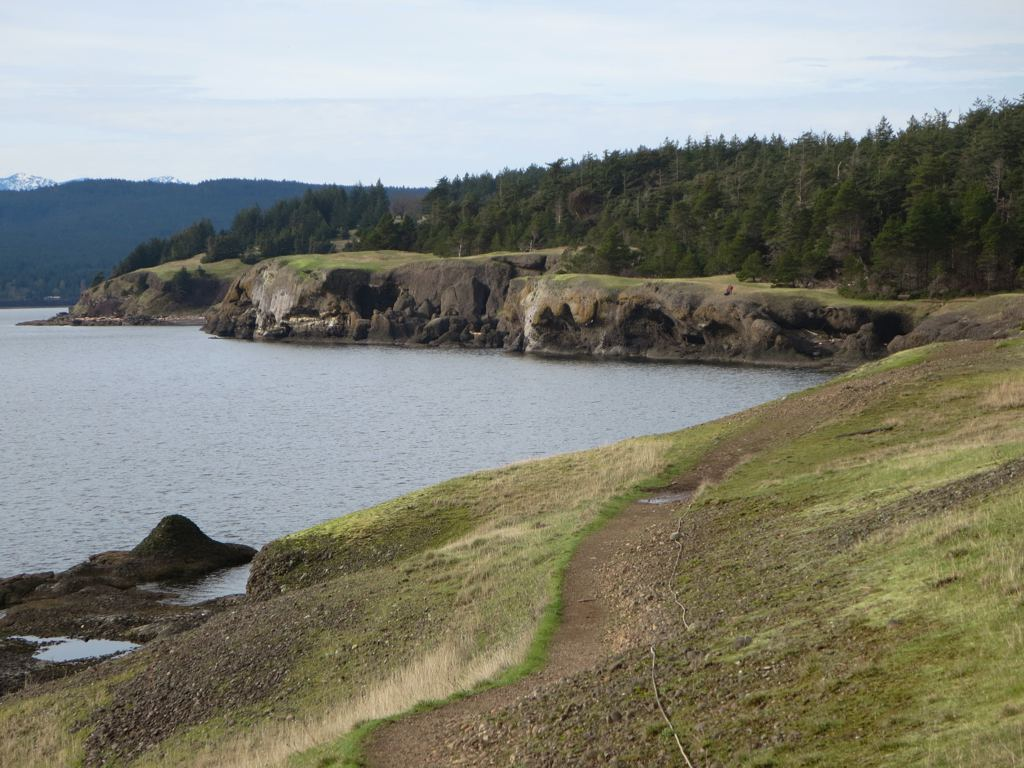
- The cliffs of Helliwell Provincial Park

- Location within British Columbia Location within Comox Valley Regional District
- Interactive map of Helliwell Provincial Park
- Location: Hornby Island, British Columbia, Canada
- Nearest city: Courtenay
- Coordinates: 49°31′00″N 124°36′20″W
- Area: 2,872 hectares (7,100 acres)
- Established: September 16, 1966
- Governing body: BC Parks
- Website: bcparks.ca/helliwell-park/

Helliwell Provincial Park is a provincial park in British Columbia, Canada located on a headland at the northeast end of Hornby Island.

The land, formerly a farm belonging to the Acton family, was donated by Mr. J. L. Helliwell. The park was established by Order in Council 2681 on September 16, 1966 and expanded several times thereafter. Its 2,872 hectares (7,100 acres) now include Flora Islet and part of Lambert Channel.

There are facilities for hiking, canoeing, picnicking, sightseeing, and scuba diving. Restroom facilities consist of four pit toilets.

The park has large old-growth Douglas-fir trees and rare Garry oak ecosystems. A trail loops around the bluffs that overlook the Strait of Georgia and links-up with Tribune Bay. The Garry oak meadow ecosystem is one of the many microclimates located within British Columbia and is considered an endangered habitat.

The cliffs in the southern part of the park form a unique microclimate that local community groups are attempting to protect. These cliffs are also nesting areas for the pelagic cormorant.

== See also ==
- Tribune Bay Provincial Park
