= Courtenay, British Columbia =

City in British Columbia, Canada

Courtenay
- City
- City of Courtenay
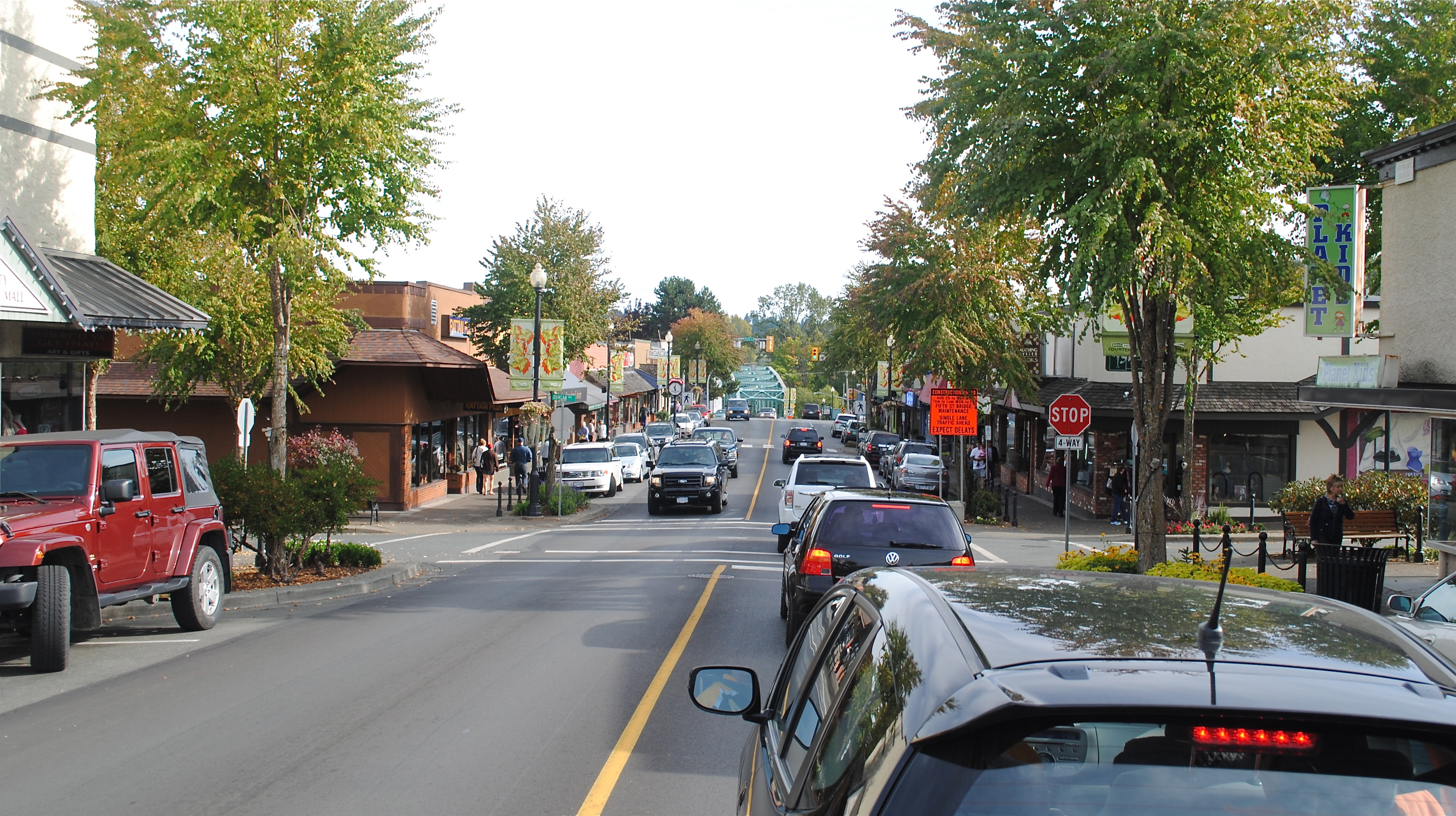
- Downtown Courtenay

- Location within Vancouver Island Location within British Columbia
- Coordinates: 49°41′22″N 124°59′45″W
- Country: Canada
- Province: British Columbia
- Region: Mid-Island
- Regional District: Comox Valley
- Incorporated: 1969

Government
  - Mayor: Bob Wells

Area
  - Land: 32.41 km^{2} (12.51 sq mi)
  - Metro: 596.00 km^{2} (230.12 sq mi)
- Elevation: 13 m (43 ft)

Population (2021)
  - City: 28,420
  - Density: 876.9/km^{2} (2,271/sq mi)
  - Metro: 63,220
  - Metro density: 90.9/km^{2} (235/sq mi)
- Time zone: UTC−07:00 (PT)
- Forward sortation area: V9J, V9N
- Area codes: 250, 778, 236, 672
- Website: www.courtenay.ca

Courtenay (/ˈkɔːrtni/ KORT-nee) is a city of 28,420 on the east coast of Vancouver Island, in the Canadian province of British Columbia. It is the largest community and only city in the area commonly known as the Comox Valley. Courtenay is the seat of the Comox Valley Regional District; this district replaced the Comox-Strathcona Regional District. Courtenay is 4 kilometres (2.5 mi) west of the town of Comox, 7 km (4.3 mi) northeast of the village of Cumberland, 5 kilometres (3.1 mi) northwest of the unincorporated settlement of Royston, and 108 kilometres (67 mi) northwest of Nanaimo.

It was named after the nearby river, Courtenay River, which in turn had been named after Rear-Admiral Courtenay.

Courtenay and nearby Comox are served by the coast-spanning Island Highway, the Island Rail Corridor, and a local airport in Comox.

== History ==
=== Early history ===
Archaeological evidence suggests there was an active Coast Salish fishing settlement on the shores of the Courtenay River Estuary for at least 4,000 years. Due to its gentle climate, fertile soil and abundant sea life, the Coast Salish residents called the area kw'umuxws (Li'kwala for plentiful), which was eventually anglicized to Komoux and then to Comox.

At the time of first contact with Europeans, the Pentlatch Nation, who spoke the Pentlatch language of the Coast Salish family, occupied the shores of present-day Comox Bay. (The last speaker of the Island Comox dialect died in 1995.) Another Island Comox speaking Nation, the K'ómoks, occupied settlements further north along the east coast of Vancouver Island, in the area of present-day Campbell River, including Quadra Island and several other Gulf islands.

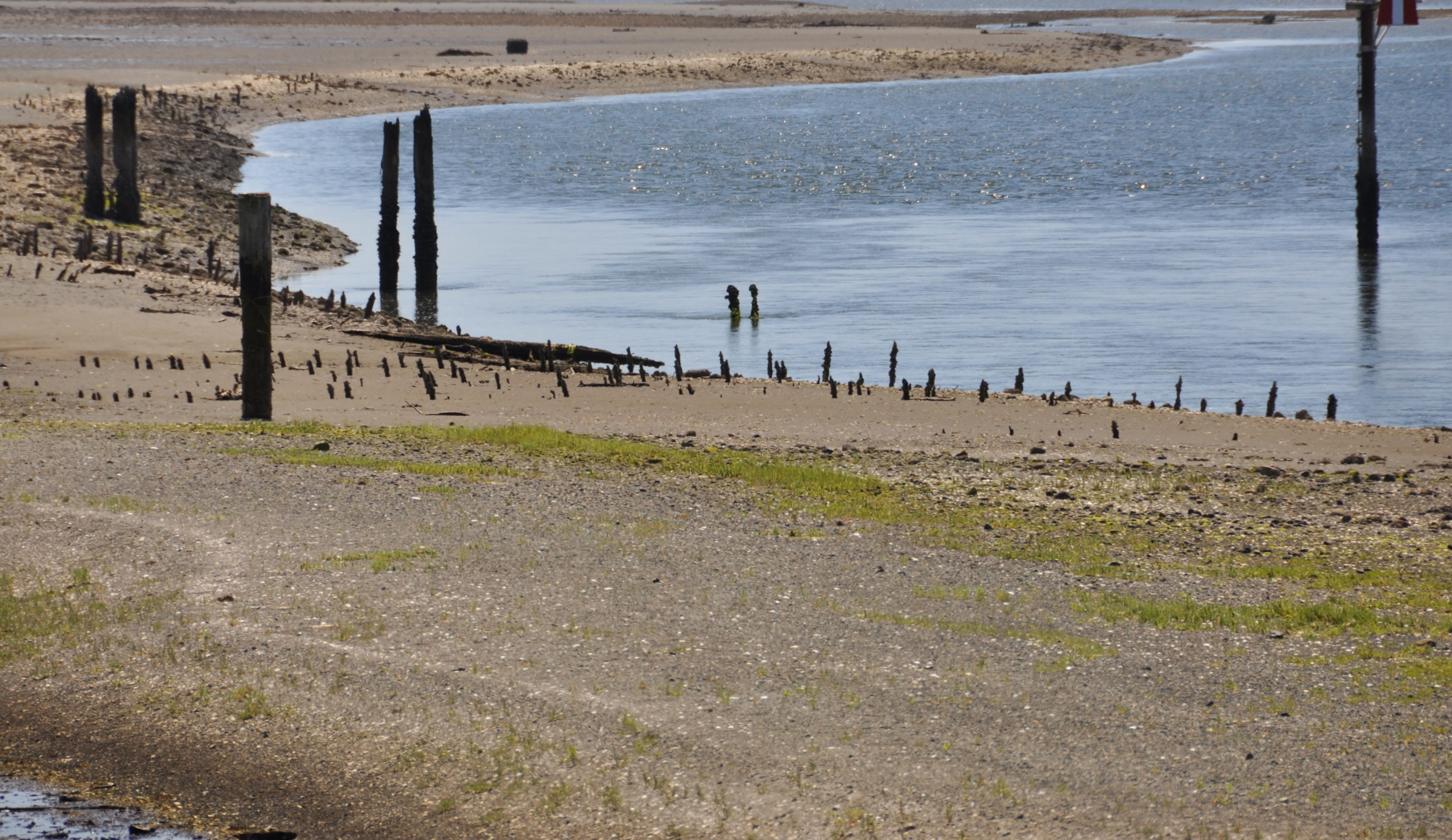
Low tide exposes thousands of small stakes once used by Coast Salish First Nations for fishing weirs.

Along the tidal flats of the estuary, the Pentlatch set out elaborate fishing weirs—nets tied to wooden stakes that would be covered at high tide but uncovered at low tide, allowing trapped fish to be removed. These wooden stakes can still be seen at low tide — local archaeologist Nancy Greene has estimated that up to 200,000 wooden stakes remain in the mud flats. Several of these wooden stakes were carbon dated, revealing the oldest to be made from a hemlock tree c.750 CE, while the youngest dated from around 1830. Some scientists estimate that the weirs could have supported a population of several thousand people. The Pentlatch also harvested the abundant shellfish in Comox Bay.

By the 19th century, the K'ómoks had been driven out of their lands near Campbell River by the Lekwiltok, a particularly fierce group of Kwakwaka'wakw. The K'ómoks migrated south to the shores of the Courtenay River estuary, where they allied with the resident Pentlatch against their common enemy. In 1862, a major smallpox epidemic swept across Vancouver Island, killing an estimated 30% of First Nations people. A census of First Nations in the Comox Valley taken in 1876 revealed that the local First Nations population had dwindled to only 88 K'ómoks and 21 Pentlatch.

European settlers began to arrive in the area in 1872, and by 1876, the K'ómoks and Pentledge had been moved onto two reservations: Comox Indian Reserve No. 1 adjacent to the village of Comox, and Pentledge Indian Reserve No. 2 at the confluence of the Puntledge and Tsolum rivers adjacent to the village of Courtenay.

=== Early European explorers ===
In 1579, Francis Drake, on his circumnavigation of the globe in the Golden Hind, found a good port somewhere along the northwest coast of North America and stayed for several months while restocking supplies and trading with the inhabitants of the area. He named the region Nova Albion, Latin for "New Britain". Drake's detailed logs — and the exact location of Nova Albion — were later lost in a 17th-century fire, but some historians believe Drake made a landing in the Courtenay River estuary.

In 1791, a Spanish expedition led by Dionisio Alcalá Galiano and Cayetano Valdés y Flores produced a crude chart of the Strait of Georgia and possibly visited Comox Bay. Captain George Vancouver arrived the following year, tasked by the British government with charting the northwest coast of North America. Vancouver, in concert with the Spanish expedition, entered the Courtenay River estuary between the present-day locations of Courtenay and Comox and charted the shoreline of the estuary.

=== Early settlers ===
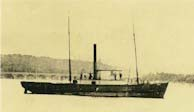
HMS Grappler, shown here in later service as a packet steamer, brought the first settlers to the Comox Valley in 1862.

By the middle of the 19th century, European and American settlements had sprung up in the Vancouver area and on southern Vancouver Island. In 1837, the Hudson Bay Company steamship Beaver began to search the south and east coasts of Vancouver Island for suitable locations for new trading posts, and subsequently set up a post overlooking the Courtenay River estuary, calling it "Komoux".

HMS Constance, commanded by Captain Courtenay, was a frequent visitor to the area. In 1848, the river flowing through the Koumax valley was informally named the Courtenay River by the sailors of HMS Constance after their captain. In 1857, Captain George Richards of HMS Plumper was tasked with undertaking a complete survey of the coastline of Vancouver Island, and was given authority to name local landmarks. When he arrived in the area, he confirmed the name of the river as the Courtenay.

In 1853 Sir James Douglas, governor of Vancouver Island, took a journey up the coast of Vancouver Island aboard SS Beaver, and recognized the area's agricultural potential. In 1861, Lieutenant Richard Mayne of the Royal Navy visited the area and wrote of the rich agricultural prospects of the area, saying it had taken him a day and a half to walk over the land "through which a plough might be driven from end to end". That same year Governor Douglas issued a land and settlement proclamation for the Koumox Valley, intending to divert new settlers away from the Victoria area as well as from the newly discovered Cariboo gold fields. He offered land in the valley for $1 per acre and free transportation to the area.

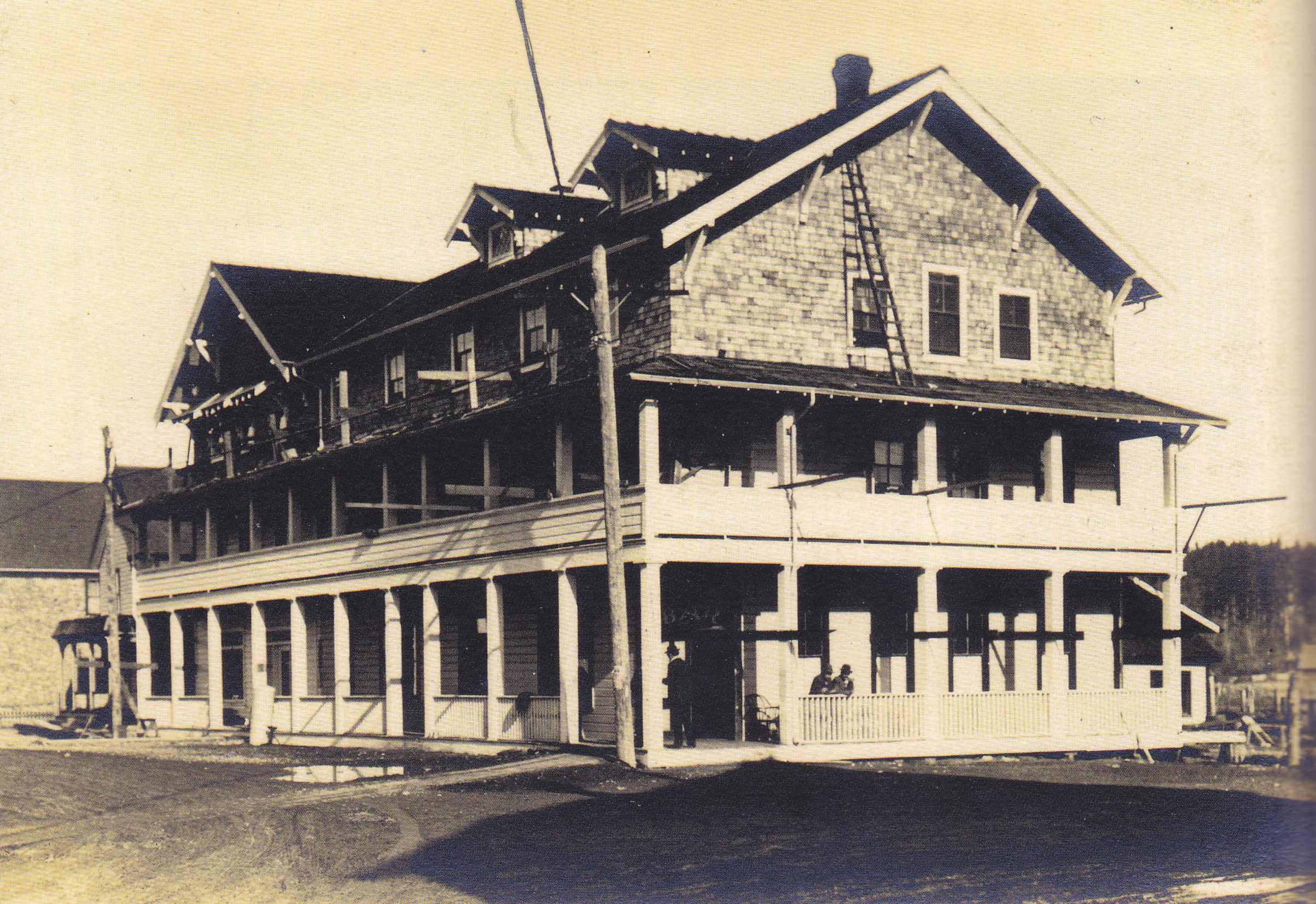
The Courtenay Hotel c. 1880, centre of the old townsite on the east side of the Courtenay River, and regularly flooded by king tides and spring run-off

Although some unofficial settlers had arrived in previous years, the first government-approved settlers arrived in 1862 aboard HMS Grappler. The majority of the settlers staked out farm lots on the flat and fertile "prairies" on the east side of the river, and a small village sprung up on the east bank of the river to supply their needs. The Courtenay Hotel, also known as Courtenay House, became the focal point of a village that included a general store, a small bank, a barber, and livery barns. However, it was not an ideal location, since the river regularly burst its banks due to king tides or spring run-off, flooding the entire village.

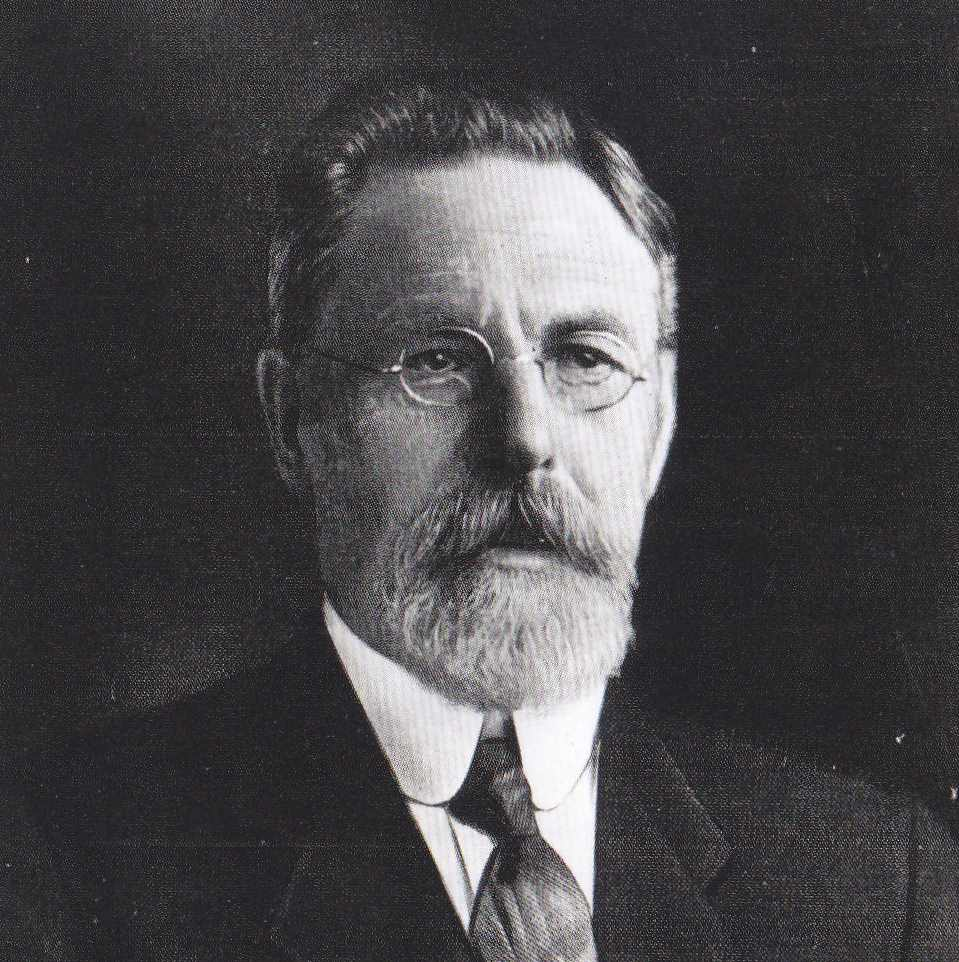
Joseph McPhee

In 1864, Robert Brown, leading the Vancouver Island Exploring Expedition, discovered coal deposits in the Comox Valley, but these went unexploited for two decades. In 1874, a new settler to the area, Joseph McPhee, won the contract to build a bridge that connected the regularly flooded flats on the east side of the river to higher ground on the west side of the river. When the bridge was finished, McPhee and business partner Reginald Pidcock bought up 10 acres (4.0 ha) of land on the western side of the river immediately adjacent to the new bridge. McPhee built a store beside the bridge, while Pidcock built the Courtenay River's first commercial enterprise, a saw mill.

In 1888 Robert Dunsmuir established a mine in nearby Union, later renamed Cumberland, which brought an influx of settlers, and Chinese and Japanese immigrants. McPhee and Pidcock recognized the economic potential of a townsite on the western bank of the river, which would be closer to the mines. They hired a surveyor, George Drabble, to survey and subdivide their land into town lots, which they quickly sold to businessmen and homeowners. The townsite on the much drier west side of the river, called for a time "New Courtenay", quickly developed. Many of the stores and businesses centred on what was originally called Union Street (now 5th Street), which ascended from McPhee's bridge.

=== Early 20th century ===
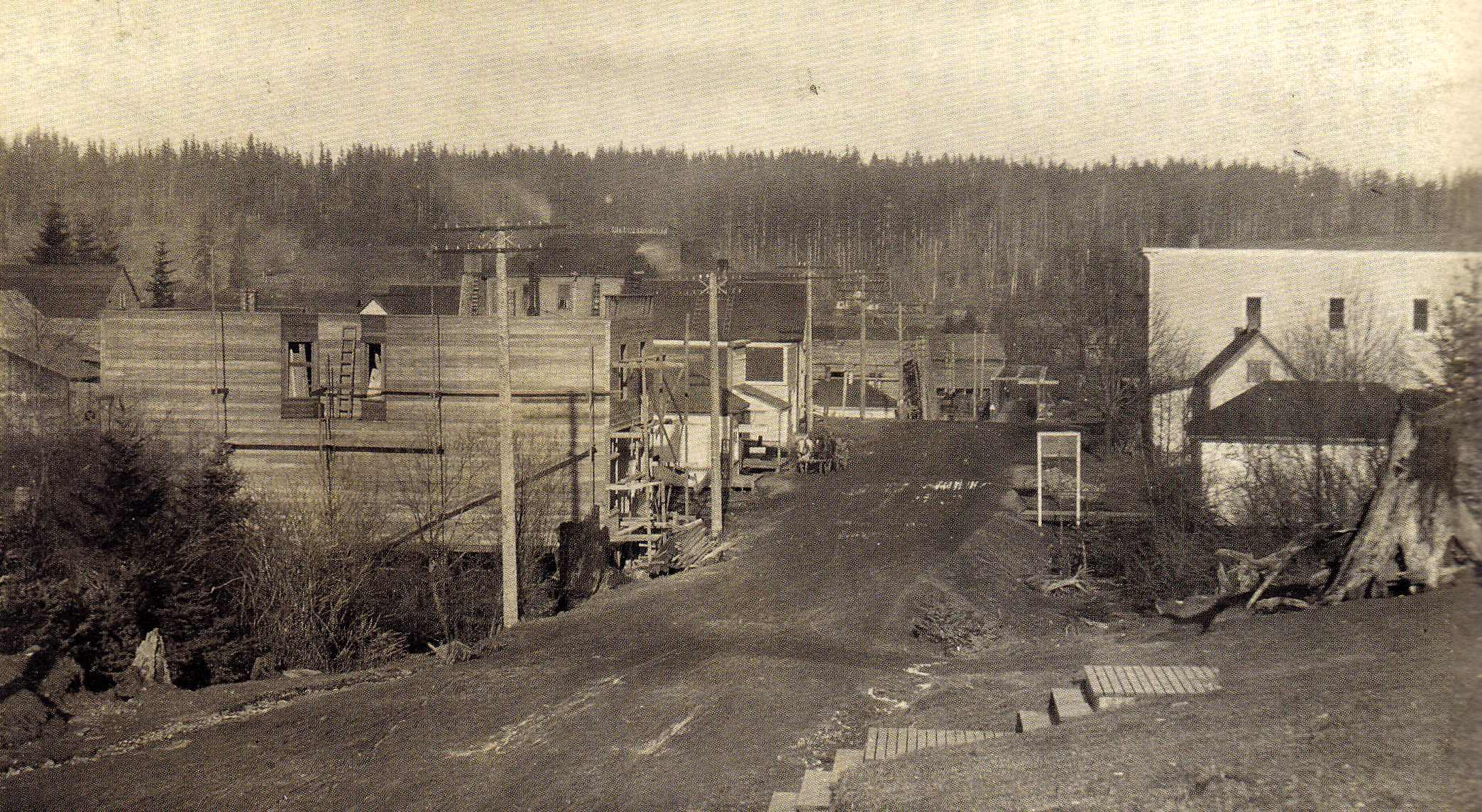
Fifth Street c. 1900, looking east down to the bridge

The Comox Co-operative Creamery opened in 1901, encouraging the development of dairy farms in the fertile valley. Courtenay had no connecting roads to the rest of the Island; news and mail were provided by packet steamers. But in 1905, Joseph McPhee brought telephone service to his store, providing the isolated community with immediate contact to the outside world. A connecting road to Nanaimo and Victoria was finally built in 1910, and the E&N Railway arrived in 1914, bringing an end to the packet steamer era.

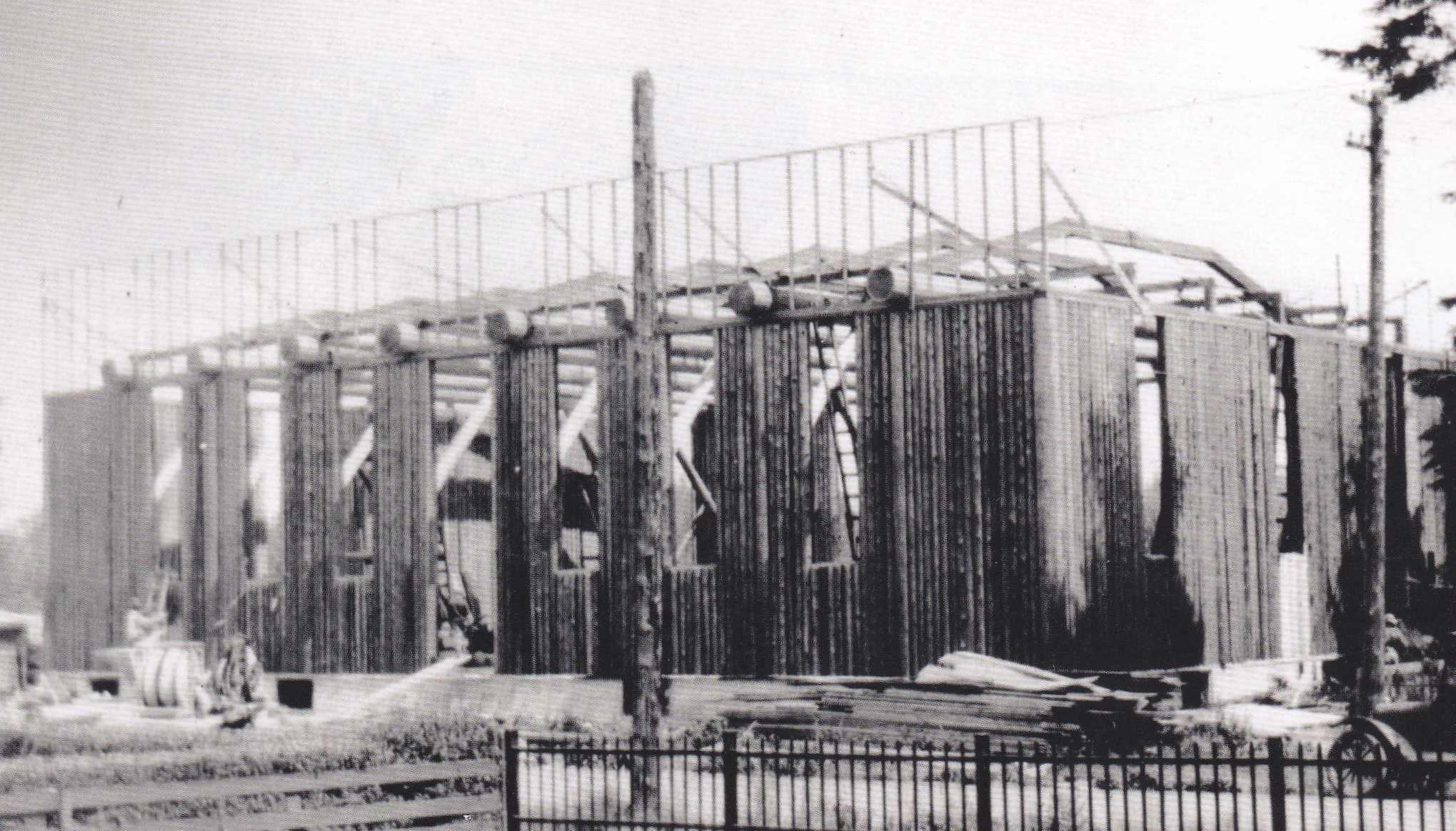
The Native Sons Hall under construction

Electricity arrived in the area in 1914, provided by Courtenay Electric Light Heat and Power However, some citizens, led by Joseph McPhee, believed that electricity should be provided by a publicly owned company, and Courtenay was incorporated as a town on 1 January 1915 to facilitate this. In order to make a publicly owned company a reality, McPhee ran for the office of mayor, but lost by a mere five votes to rival Dan McPatrick, who favoured a private electrical company. However, a majority of the alderman elected to council were allies of McPhee, and in December 1916, the new town purchased Courtenay Electric Light Heat and Power, making it a public utility.

On 12 July 1915, a large fire ripped through 5th Street destroying much of the south side of the downtown. After much of the street was rebuilt, another fire hit the south side of 5th Street, again destroying many of the stores. In both cases, due to the lack of a water system, the citizens were only able to fight the fires with a bucket brigade. Joseph McPhee led the call for a water system, which was installed by October 1921.

In 1921, a new chapter of the Native Sons of Canada was formed in Courtenay, with Joseph McPhee as president. They decided to build a hall, and a large log structure was completed in 1928, the largest freespan log building in Canada.

In 1923, a steel bridge at the 5th Street river crossing replaced McPhee's fifty-year-old wooden structure. The town's population experienced steady growth in the years between the First and Second World Wars, increasing from 600 people in 1914 to 1700 in 1941. By 1951, the population had grown to 2500, and Courtenay was designated a city in 1953. In 1960, the 5th Street bridge built in 1923 was replaced with the current steel structure. Concrete sidewalks and a sewer system were installed in 1962.

In 1975, the construction of Driftwood Mall and the opening of a second river crossing, the 17th Street lift bridge, refocused the business district from 5th Street to Cliffe Avenue.

=== Earthquake of 1946 ===
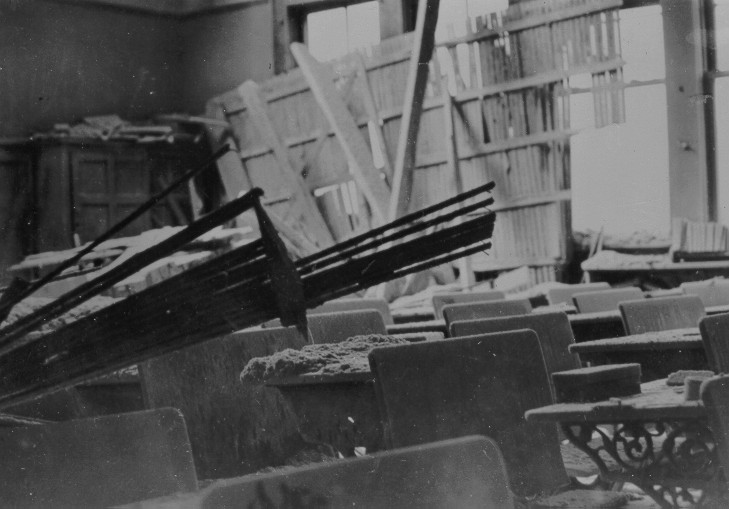
Damage to Courtenay West elementary school from 1946 Earthquake

On 14 June 1946, a 7.3 magnitude earthquake struck just west of Courtenay, with the epicentre located at Forbidden Plateau. The earthquake was felt as far north as Prince Rupert and as far south as Portland, Oregon. Many of the town's chimneys were destroyed, and there was significant damage to the post office and what is now Courtenay Elementary School. This was the largest earthquake to hit Vancouver Island, and the largest onshore earthquake in Canada on record. There were only two reported deaths: one Seattle man died of a heart attack and another drowned when his boat capsized due to a resulting wave.

== Geography ==
According to Statistics Canada, the city has a total land area of 26.68 km^{2} (10.30 sq mi). The city is located on the British Columbia Coast and sits on the Strait of Georgia.

=== Climate ===
The climate in Courtenay is classified, according to the Köppen climate classification, as an Oceanic climate (Cfb) / Mediterranean climate (Csb).

Approximately 13% of the average rainfall amount that falls in November falls in July. The city experiences annual precipitation of about 35% of that which falls in Tofino on the west side of the island only 89 km (55 mi) away.

Climate data is from Comox Airport, located approximately 7.5 km (4.7 mi) east north east of Courtenay.

Climate data for Comox (Comox Airport) WMO ID: 71893; coordinates 49°43′N 124°54′W; elevation: 25.6 m (84 ft); 1991–2020 normals, extremes 1991–present
Month	Jan	Feb	Mar	Apr	May	Jun	Jul	Aug	Sep	Oct	Nov	Dec	Year
Record high humidex	16.2	15.8	19.6	26.2	31.6	37.3	40.4	40.3	33.7	26.0	20.9	17.7	40.4
Record high °C (°F)	16.7 (62.1)	16.3 (61.3)	19.6 (67.3)	26.8 (80.2)	31.7 (89.1)	38 (100)	35.2 (95.4)	33.6 (92.5)	31.7 (89.1)	22.9 (73.2)	17.8 (64.0)	17.4 (63.3)	35.2 (95.4)
Mean daily maximum °C (°F)	6.3 (43.3)	7.2 (45.0)	9.5 (49.1)	12.9 (55.2)	17.2 (63.0)	19.9 (67.8)	23.1 (73.6)	23.0 (73.4)	19.1 (66.4)	12.9 (55.2)	8.7 (47.7)	6.2 (43.2)	13.8 (56.8)
Daily mean °C (°F)	3.9 (39.0)	4.2 (39.6)	6.1 (43.0)	9.0 (48.2)	12.9 (55.2)	15.7 (60.3)	18.5 (65.3)	18.3 (64.9)	14.8 (58.6)	9.6 (49.3)	5.9 (42.6)	3.7 (38.7)	10.2 (50.4)
Mean daily minimum °C (°F)	1.5 (34.7)	1.2 (34.2)	2.6 (36.7)	5.0 (41.0)	8.6 (47.5)	11.5 (52.7)	13.7 (56.7)	13.5 (56.3)	10.5 (50.9)	6.3 (43.3)	3.1 (37.6)	1.3 (34.3)	6.6 (43.9)
Record low °C (°F)	−21.1 (−6.0)	−16.1 (3.0)	−13.9 (7.0)	−4.4 (24.1)	−2.8 (27.0)	0.5 (32.9)	5.0 (41.0)	3.3 (37.9)	−1.7 (28.9)	−4.8 (23.4)	−13.3 (8.1)	−15.0 (5.0)	−21.1 (−6.0)
Record low wind chill	−18.6	−21.6	−16.1	−5.9	−2.0	0.0	0.0	0.0	−2.7	−9.8	−20.3	−25.0	−25.0
Average precipitation mm (inches)	177.4 (6.98)	111.6 (4.39)	107.5 (4.23)	64.1 (2.52)	40.3 (1.59)	41.8 (1.65)	23.8 (0.94)	31.2 (1.23)	46.7 (1.84)	125.4 (4.94)	188.8 (7.43)	193.6 (7.62)	1,152.2 (45.36)
Average rainfall mm (inches)	165.1 (6.50)	102.6 (4.04)	98.4 (3.87)	64.1 (2.52)	40.3 (1.59)	41.8 (1.65)	23.8 (0.94)	31.2 (1.23)	46.7 (1.84)	125.3 (4.93)	183.5 (7.22)	177.3 (6.98)	1,099.9 (43.30)
Average snowfall cm (inches)	12.4 (4.9)	9.0 (3.5)	6.8 (2.7)	0.0 (0.0)	0.0 (0.0)	0.0 (0.0)	0.0 (0.0)	0.0 (0.0)	0.0 (0.0)	0.1 (0.0)	5.5 (2.2)	16.9 (6.7)	50.8 (20.0)
Average precipitation days (≥ 0.2 mm)	19.9	16.2	16.9	13.9	11.6	11.2	7.1	7.0	9.8	17.1	19.7	21.2	171.6
Average rainy days (≥ 0.2 mm)	18.9	15.0	16.3	13.9	11.6	11.2	7.1	7.0	9.8	17.0	19.4	20.2	167.5
Average snowy days (≥ 0.2 cm)	2.4	2.3	1.6	0.07	0.0	0.0	0.0	0.0	0.0	0.10	0.83	2.7	10.0
Average relative humidity (%) (at 1500 LST)	83.8	76.5	70.4	63.8	61.5	60.2	57.3	57.6	62.8	75.8	81.3	83.4	69.5
Mean monthly sunshine hours	57.8	87.6	125.2	182.5	230.7	230.1	300.0	268.8	226.9	116.3	57.6	41.4	1,925.8
Percentage possible sunshine	21.6	30.7	34.0	44.3	48.5	47.4	61.1	60.1	59.8	34.7	21.0	16.3	40.0
Source: Environment and Climate Change Canada (sun 1981–2010)

== Demographics ==
In the 2021 Canadian census conducted by Statistics Canada, Courtenay had a population of 28,420 living in 12,992 of its 13,414 total private dwellings, a change of 10.8% from its 2016 population of 25,639. With a land area of 32.42 km^{2} (12.52 sq mi), it had a population density of 876.6/km^{2} (2,270.4/sq mi) in 2021.

As per the 2006 census, there were 9,750 households, out of which 19.08% were couples with children, 31.74% were couples without children, 31.54% were single person and 17.64% were other. The average household size was 2.2. The same census indicated that in the city, the population was spread out, with 23.15% under the age of 20, 5.81% from 20 to 24, 24.27% from 25 to 44, 28.37% from 45 to 64, and 18.37% who were 65 years of age or older. The median age was 43 years compared to 40.8 for BC as a whole. For every 100 females there were 89.7 males and for every 100 females age 20 and over, there were 86.6 males. For every 100 males there were 111.5 females and for every 100 males age 20 and over, there were 115.5 females.

According to the 2006 census, there were 17,135 people in the city with an income, with a median total income of $22,662. Of this income, earnings were 64.7%, government transfers were 16.5%, and other income was 18.8%. There were 11,585 people with earnings and the average overall earnings were $20,529, with an average among full-year full-time earnings of $36,960.

Also as of 2006, it was the 61st largest metropolitan area (which includes Comox and Comox Valley B) and the 69th largest urban area.

=== Ethnicity ===
Panethnic groups in the City of Courtenay (2001−2021)
Panethnic group	2021		2016		2011		2006		2001	
Panethnic group	Pop.	%	Pop.	%	Pop.	%	Pop.	%	Pop.	%
European (Note: Statistic includes all persons that did not make up part of a visible minority or an indigenous identity.)	23,390	84.09%	21,500	85.98%	21,120	89.57%	19,665	90.27%	16,320	89.89%
Indigenous	2,110	7.59%	1,770	7.08%	1,210	5.13%	1,115	5.12%	725	3.99%
Southeast Asian (Note: Statistic includes total responses of "Filipino" and "Southeast Asian" under visible minority section on census.)	685	2.46%	400	1.6%	375	1.59%	135	0.62%	325	1.79%
East Asian (Note: Statistic includes total responses of "Chinese", "Korean", and "Japanese" under visible minority section on census.)	635	2.28%	705	2.82%	545	2.31%	405	1.86%	540	2.97%
South Asian	445	1.6%	290	1.16%	80	0.34%	110	0.5%	30	0.17%
African	230	0.83%	200	0.8%	80	0.34%	105	0.48%	85	0.47%
Latin American	115	0.41%	40	0.16%	70	0.3%	70	0.32%	80	0.44%
Middle Eastern (Note: Statistic includes total responses of "West Asian" and "Arab" under visible minority section on census.)	95	0.34%	15	0.06%	25	0.11%	0	0%	0	0%
Other/multiracial (Note: Statistic includes total responses of "Visible minority, n.i.e." and "Multiple visible minorities" under visible minority section on census.)	115	0.41%	80	0.32%	65	0.28%	10	0.05%	45	0.25%
Total responses	27,815	97.87%	25,005	97.68%	23,580	97.85%	21,785	99.29%	18,155	99.19%
Total population	28,420	100%	25,599	100%	24,099	100%	21,940	100%	18,304	100%
Note: Totals greater than 100% due to multiple origin responses.

=== Religion ===
According to the 2021 census, religious groups in Courtenay included:

- Irreligion (16,985 persons or 61.1%)
- Christianity (9,735 persons or 35.0%)
- Sikhism (170 persons or 0.6%)
- Islam (140 persons or 0.5%)
- Buddhism (125 persons or 0.4%)
- Hinduism (120 persons or 0.4%)
- Judaism (55 persons or 0.2%)
- Indigenous Spirituality (40 persons or 0.1%)

== Economy ==
From its inception, Courtenay's economy relied heavily on the extraction of natural resources, like coal, logging, fishing, and agriculture. Over the years as this natural resource extraction decreased, Courtenay has focused its economic growth on supplying services to the large retiree community and the military families at CFB Comox, which is the largest employer in the Comox Valley, supplying approximately 1,400 jobs. Tourism has also been steadily increasing and has now become a vital part of the Comox Valley economy. St. Joseph's General Hospital, Mount Washington home of the Critically Endangered Vancouver Island marmot, Crown Isle Golf Course, Kingfisher Resort and Spa and the Best Western Westerly Hotel, and the Air Force base at Comox are in the top 15 employers in the Comox Valley, providing 1,200 jobs.

Approximately $573.8 million is spent in the retail industry in the Comox Valley, with half of the sales coming from supermarkets, gas stations, and car sales. The average household income is $59,136, which is 16% less than the BC average and 18% lower than the Canadian average. In Courtenay, 60% of the income sources is employment, 19% from pensions, and 6% from investments.

== Arts and culture ==
Every summer, usually in July, the largest music festival, the Island Music Fest on Vancouver Island takes place in the Comox Valley. Performers and audience members gather for three days of camping and an eclectic mix of music. There are several other festivals in the area and they include the North Island Festival of Performing Arts, Fiddlefest, Comox Valley Highland Games and the Comox Valley Piano Society puts on performances at the Stan Hagen Theatre.

The city is home to the Comox Valley Youth Music Centre, originally the Courtenay Youth Music Camp, a two-week-long annual summer school, which has increased to a six-week program. Notable people involved with the centre include Harry Freedman who taught there 1971–1982, Gilles Bellemare (composition), Diana Krall (piano), Nancy Argenta (voice), Ingrid Jensen (trumpet) and Renee Rosnes (piano).

The Sid Williams Theatre, located in downtown Courtenay, is the major performance theatre in the Comox Valley. Other theatres include the Stan Hagen Theatre.

Performing theatre groups include the Rainbow Youth Theatre and the Courtenay Little Theatre.

The Vancouver Island Regional Library has a branch in downtown Courtenay. The Courtenay branch offers many services such as free Wi-Fi for library members, computer access, and printing and photocopying stations.

== Attractions ==
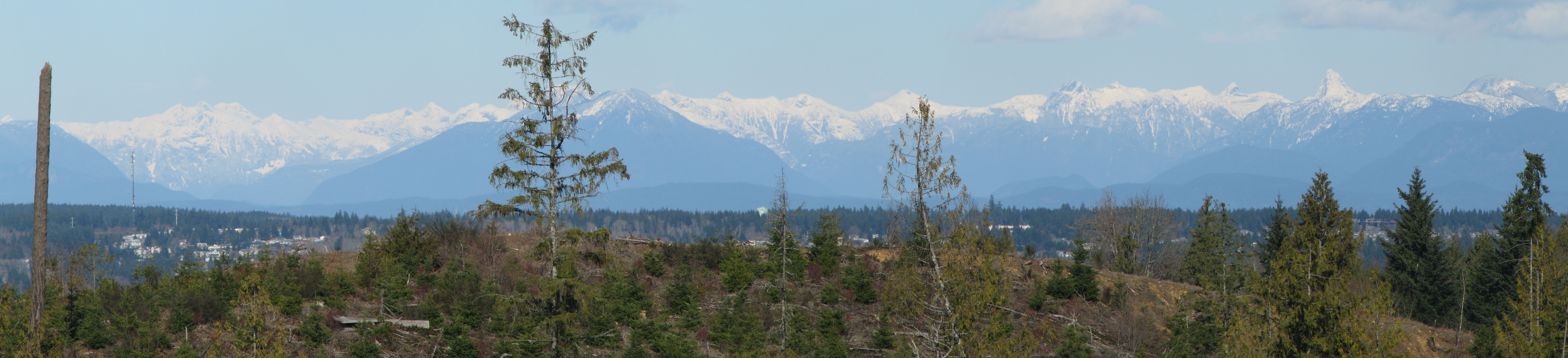
View of mainland British Columbia coastal mountains from Courtenay on Vancouver Island

=== Paleontology ===
Courtenay has established itself as a hot spot for paleontology discoveries. Professional and amateur paleontologists have been discovering fossils of pre-historic sea life in Courtenay, and the Comox Valley is considered to be the first stop on the Great Canadian Fossil Trail. Millions of years ago Vancouver Island was submerged under a warm salt-water sea. This habitat provided an excellent home to pre-historic marine life. After the Cretaceous–Paleogene extinction event, that caused the extinction of dinosaurs, Vancouver Island began to be shaped by volcanic activity, tectonic plate movement, and glacial ice movements. This activity and glacial erosion along the Puntledge and Trent rivers have revealed some of that 80-million-year-old sea floor. This access to the ancient sea bed has provided the opportunity for many great marine dinosaur discoveries, like the Elasmosaur and the Mosasaur.

The first major paleontological discovery in Courtenay occurred in 1988 when resident Mike Trask and his daughter discovered the first fossil of an 80-million-year-old Elasmosaur on the banks of the Puntledge River. Over the next few months, the excavation, led by Dr. Roif Ludvigson, revealed a near complete skeleton. The skull and other key bones for identifying the species were in poor condition, and it is still unknown as to what species or genus this Elasmosaur belonged. The original bones and a replica model are on display at the Courtenay & District Museum and Paleontology Center.

In 1991, during a field trip, Dr. Joe Zanbilowicz discovered a fossilized bone along the Puntledge River and a few more vertebrae were excavated that day. During the summers of 1997 and 1998, excavation led by Dr. Dirk Meckert revealed a near complete Mosasaur skeleton. After analysis of the skeleton began, paleontologists Dr. Meckter and Dr. Betsy Nicholls, realized this 80-million year old skeleton was a new kind of Mosasaur that had not yet been discovered. They named this new species of Mosasaur, Kourisodon Puntledgensis, for its unique two extra rows of razor-like teeth and its discovery location.

After these two large discoveries, there are still many species of animals being discovered, such as desmatochelys (sea turtles), Nanaimoteuthis jeletzkyi (vampire squids), and multiple species of octopods.

=== Museums and art galleries ===
The HMCS Alberni Museum and Memorial (HAMM) is located in the heart of downtown Courtenay at the Courtenay Mall. HAMM features the memorial to the men of HMCS Alberni and U-480, as well as exhibits from the Great War to the present day of the Canadian Forces. Periodic guest exhibits are featured such as "War Brides: One Way Passage", "Anne Frank: A History For Today" and "One War; Two Victories" (an exhibit honouring the Chinese Canadian veterans of World War II, many of whom were born and raised in nearby Cumberland. HAMM is a founding member of CVMA (Comox Valley Museum Association). It is open year-round.

The Courtenay and District Museum and Palaeontology Centre offers fossil tours of local rivers and historical exhibits. It is open year-round.

The Comox Air Force Museum and Heritage Airpark is located at the main gate of CFB Comox and has exhibitions from the First World War onwards and is open year-round. The Heritage Airpark is home to several aircraft and is open from May to September.

Located in Cumberland is the Cumberland Museum & Archives. The museum, which is open year-round, depicts the history of coal mining in the area.

A 10-minute drive away is the Comox Archives and Museum on Comox Avenue. It explores the history of Port Augusta and a century of military presence on Goose Spit, and houses the archives from early settlers and the famous wharf in Comox where the 102nd Battalion headed off to World War I.

Just north of the city is the Nim-Nim Interpretive Centre. Situated on the Puntledge RV Campground, the site was the original home of the Pentlatch People, it is named for Chief Joe Nim-Nim. The centre highlights the achievements of the First Nations people of the area.

There are several art galleries in the city. The I-Hos Gallery is run by the K'ómoks First Nation and displays modern and traditional BC coastal First Nations art. The Comox Valley Community Arts Council helps to support the Comox Valley Art Gallery and the Muir Gallery.

=== Provincial parks ===
There are several Provincial Parks in the area: Kin Beach Provincial Park offers a large day-use area with picnic facilities and a playground, as well as a campground.

- Mitlenatch Island Nature Provincial Park, about 29.8 km (18.5 mi) away, is on Mitlenatch Island, a small islet in the northern Strait of Georgia.
- Kitty Coleman Provincial Park, about 10.7 km (6.6 mi) away, is south of the mouth of the Oyster River just northeast of Courtenay.
- Mount Geoffrey Regional Nature Park, about 29 km (18 mi) away, is on Hornby Island.
- Tribune Bay Provincial Park, about 30.7 km (19.1 mi) away, is on Hornby Island.
- Fillongley Provincial Park, about 23 km (14 mi) away, is on the east side of Denman Island, southeast of Courtenay.
- Helliwell Provincial Park, about 33.5 km (20.8 mi) away, is on the southeast end of Hornby Island.
- Strathcona Provincial Park, about 32 km (20 mi) away via the road to Mount Washington Ski Area

=== Other attractions ===
Woodhus Slough is a noted nature area especially for bird watching. Walking trails include Nymph Falls Regional Park, Seal Bay Regional Nature Park and the Courtenay Riverway Heritage Walk.

The Kitty Coleman Woodland Gardens is a woodland garden that was developed by hand. Bryan Zimmerman spent more than two years clearing the brush on his 24-acre (9.7 ha) lot and using a wheelbarrow to make the paths.

Community parks include the Simms Millennium Park and Lewis Park. Owned by the city the Simms Millennium Park is a 9-acre (3.6 ha) park that was used during the Second World War as a training area for the D-Day landings.

Mount Washington Alpine Resort is the largest commercial ski area on Vancouver Island. Each winter season many flock there to enjoy the seasonal sports such as skiing, snowboarding, cross-country skiing, snow tubing, snow shoeing, sledding and more, as well summer attractions such as mountain bike riding and hiking. The resort has a lot of on-mountain accommodation in the Alpine Village.

== Sports ==
The Comox Valley Glacier Kings play junior hockey in the Vancouver Island Junior Hockey League in the Comox Valley Sports Centre. They won the 1993-94 VIJHL League Season Championship and the 1994-95 VIJHL Playoffs. In 2009-10 they were the North Division Playoff Champions.

In 2009 the World U-17 Hockey Challenge played several games at the Comox Valley Sports Centre.

== Government ==
The city of Courtenay is governed by a mayor and six-member council. As of 2018 the mayor is Bob Wells.

Courtenay federal election results
Year	Liberal		Conservative		New Democratic		Green	
2021	13%	1,886	33%	4,677	43%	6,119	5%	725
2019	12%	1,913	34%	5,226	41%	6,315	12%	1,856

Courtenay provincial election results
Year	New Democratic		Liberal		Green	
2020	54%	7,136	28%	3,720	18%	2,446
2017	39%	5,059	36%	4,588	17%	2,196

Provincially, Ronna Leonard of the BC NDP is the Member of the Legislative Assembly for the Courtenay-Comox Riding electoral district. Prior MLAs include Stan Hagen and Evelyn Gillespie.

The city is part of the Courtenay—Alberni federal electoral district and is represented by Gord Johns of the New Democratic Party of Canada. Prior to that the city was in the electoral districts of Comox–Alberni and then Vancouver Island North.

Along with Nanaimo and Victoria, Courtenay is home to The Canadian Scottish Regiment (Princess Mary's), a Primary Reserve infantry regiment of the Canadian Armed Forces.

== Infrastructure ==
=== Transportation ===
==== Transit ====
Courtenay is served by the Comox Valley Transit System, which is managed and run by the BC Transit Authority. The cost is shared between the Comox Valley Regional District and BC Transit. Although it has only 13 bus routes, it provides quick and inexpensive transportation throughout the Comox Valley. From the main bus stop, located on Cliffe Avenue in downtown Courtenay, there are buses that go to Cumberland, Royston, as far south as Deep Bay, where a connection to the Nanaimo Regional Transit System is offered; and as far as Oyster River, where a connection to the Campbell River Transit System is offered. BC Transit also operates a handyDART transportation service, for people who have a disability or require extra assistance. In November 2007 as part of a pilot program, the Comox Valley buses were equipped with free wireless Internet access for passengers.

==== Ferry service ====
Within the Comox Valley BC Ferries has two terminals, one in Little River, Comox, and the other south of Courtenay in Buckley Bay. The port in Little River provides service for ferry travel between Powell River and Vancouver Island, while the Buckley Bay ferry terminal provides a route between Vancouver Island and Denman Island.

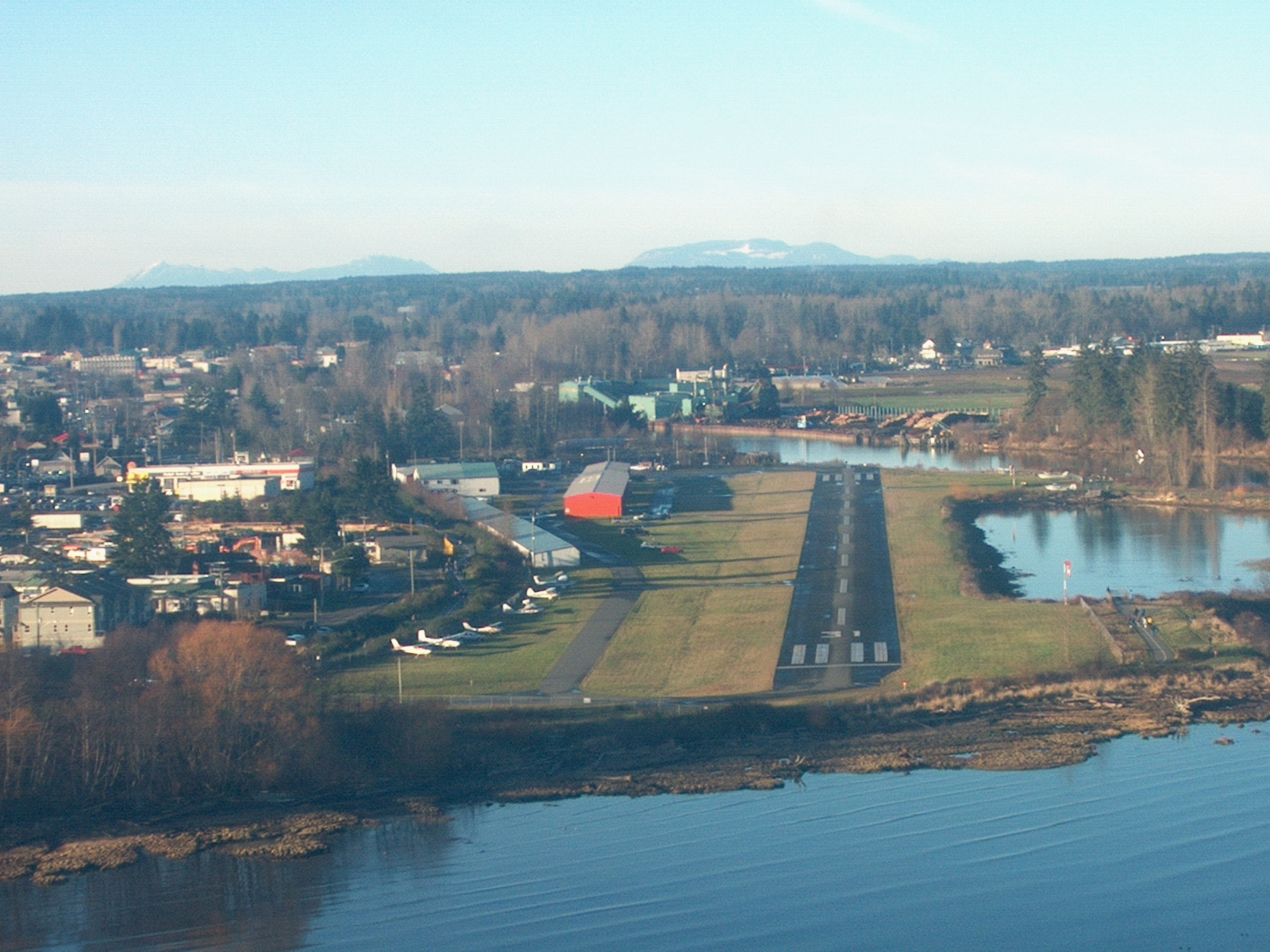
Landing at Courtenay Airpark

==== Airports ====
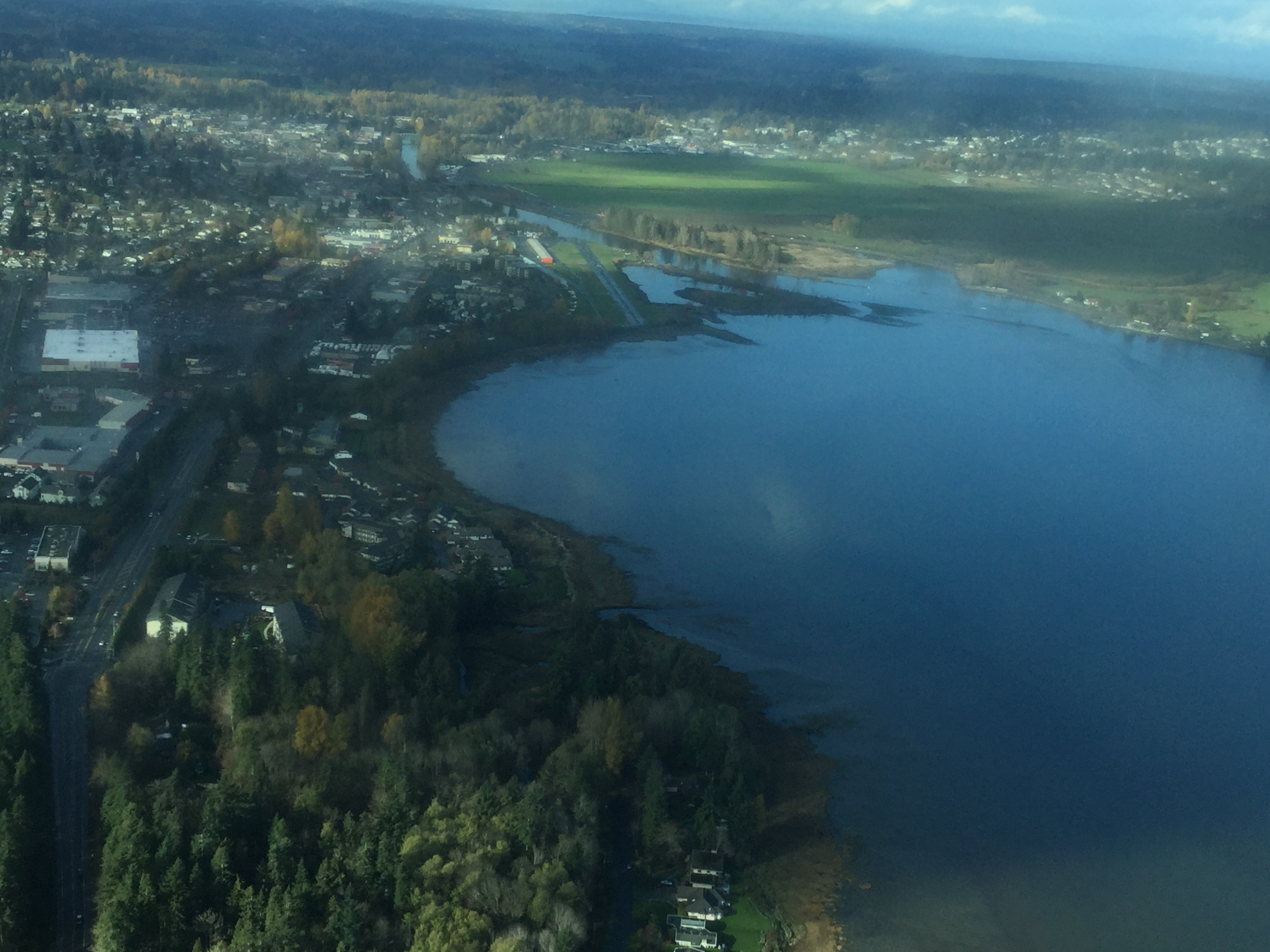
Courtenay, 31 October 2015, seen from a Cessna

There are four airports in the Courtenay area:

- Comox Valley Airport (CFB Comox), which in addition to use by Armed Forces aircraft, is used by WestJet, Central Mountain Air, and Pacific Coastal Airlines.
- Courtenay Airpark, a small airport in downtown Courtenay owned by the City of Courtenay and operated by Courtenay Airpark Association that provides hangar space for recreational fliers and aerial tours of the Comox Valley.
- Courtenay Airpark Water Aerodrome, also owned by the City of Courtenay and operated by The Courtenay Airpark Association, has daily flights operated by West Coast Air.
- Courtenay (Smit Field) Airport is a small privately owned airport.

==== Rail service ====
Via Rail used to operate the Victoria – Courtenay train on track owned by the Island Rail Corridor and former E&N Railway. The terminus, Courtenay railway station is at the former Canadian Pacific Railway station that was designated a Heritage Railway Station in 1993.

==== Highways ====
Highway 19A, the Island Highway, runs through Courtenay

=== Health care ===
Courtenay and surrounding communities are served by Island Health, the public health authority for Vancouver Island. The primary hospital in the region is the North Island Hospital, Comox Valley, which includes an emergency department, an intensive care unit, and a wellness centre. Prior to 2017, St. Joseph's General Hospital in Comox was the primary hospital for the Comox Valley and surrounding communities. Non-emergency medical care is available at the Comox Valley Urgent and Primary Care Centre.

=== Emergency services ===
Courtenay contracts out its police services to the Royal Canadian Mounted Police. Their main detachment is located in East Courtenay along Ryan Road. This detachment provides policing services to the entire Comox Valley. Courtenay also has an active branch of Crime Stoppers to help provide the Comox Valley information about recent crimes and a way to provide anonymous tips.

Fire services are provided by the Courtenay Fire Department, and it is one of the five volunteer fire departments that operate in the Comox Valley. The Courtenay Fire Department has 42 career and paid-on-call firefighters that provide fire suppression, auto extrication, fire safety education, and the issue of fire permits.

Courtenay ambulance services are provided by British Columbia Ambulance Service.

== Education ==
Within the City of Courtenay, there are numerous public schools operated by School District 71 Comox Valley, including:

=== Elementary schools ===
- Arden Elementary (Grades K-5)
- Courtenay Elementary (Grades K-5)
- École Puntledge Park Elementary (Grades K-7)
- Huband Park Elementary (Grades K-7)
- Queneesh Elementary (Grades K-7)
- Valley View Elementary (Grades K-7)

=== Secondary and Middle Schools ===
- Georges P. Vanier Secondary (Grades 8-12)
- Glacier View Secondary (Grades 7-12)
- Lake Trail Community School (Grades 6-9)
- Mark R. Isfeld Secondary (Grades 8-12)
- Nala’atsi Alternate School (Grades 9-12)

=== Post-secondary ===
Courtenay is home to the Comox Valley campus of North Island College. The campus has a cafeteria, bookstore, library, student housing, and the Stan Hagen Theatre, a venue for community events. The Comox Valley Campus offers certificate, associate degree, and bachelor's degree programs as well as a trades training centre.

== Media ==
There is one newspaper in the city, the Comox Valley Record. There are two radio stations, CKLR-FM and CFCP-FM.

== Notable persons ==
- Fraser Cain, publisher of Universe Today and co-host of Astronomy Cast
- Kim Cattrall, actress, lived in the city until she was 11 and then at 16, returned to finish high school
- Byron Dafoe, NHL goalie
- Brendan Fletcher, actor, attended Lake Trail Secondary School
- Taylor Green, baseball player, attended Mark R. Isfeld High School in and played high school baseball for the Parksville Royals of the British Columbia Premier Baseball League
- Nicole Havrda, racing driver
- Olaf Kölzig, National Hockey League goalie
- Cameron Levins, Olympian
- Brett McLean, NHL forward
- Henry McQuillan, Progressive Conservative party member of the House of Commons of Canada
- Sue Medley, rock musician
- Simon Nessman, model
- Sarah Neufeld, musician, member of Arcade Fire and The Luyas
- Spencer O'Brien, Olympic snowboarder
- Lily Hoy Price, started writing after taking a creative-writing workshop at North Island College at the age of 70
- Brian Howes, musician and producer

== See also ==
- List of francophone communities in British Columbia
- List of newspapers in Canada
