= Tribune Bay Provincial Park =

Provincial park in British Columbia, Canada

- IUCN category II (national park)
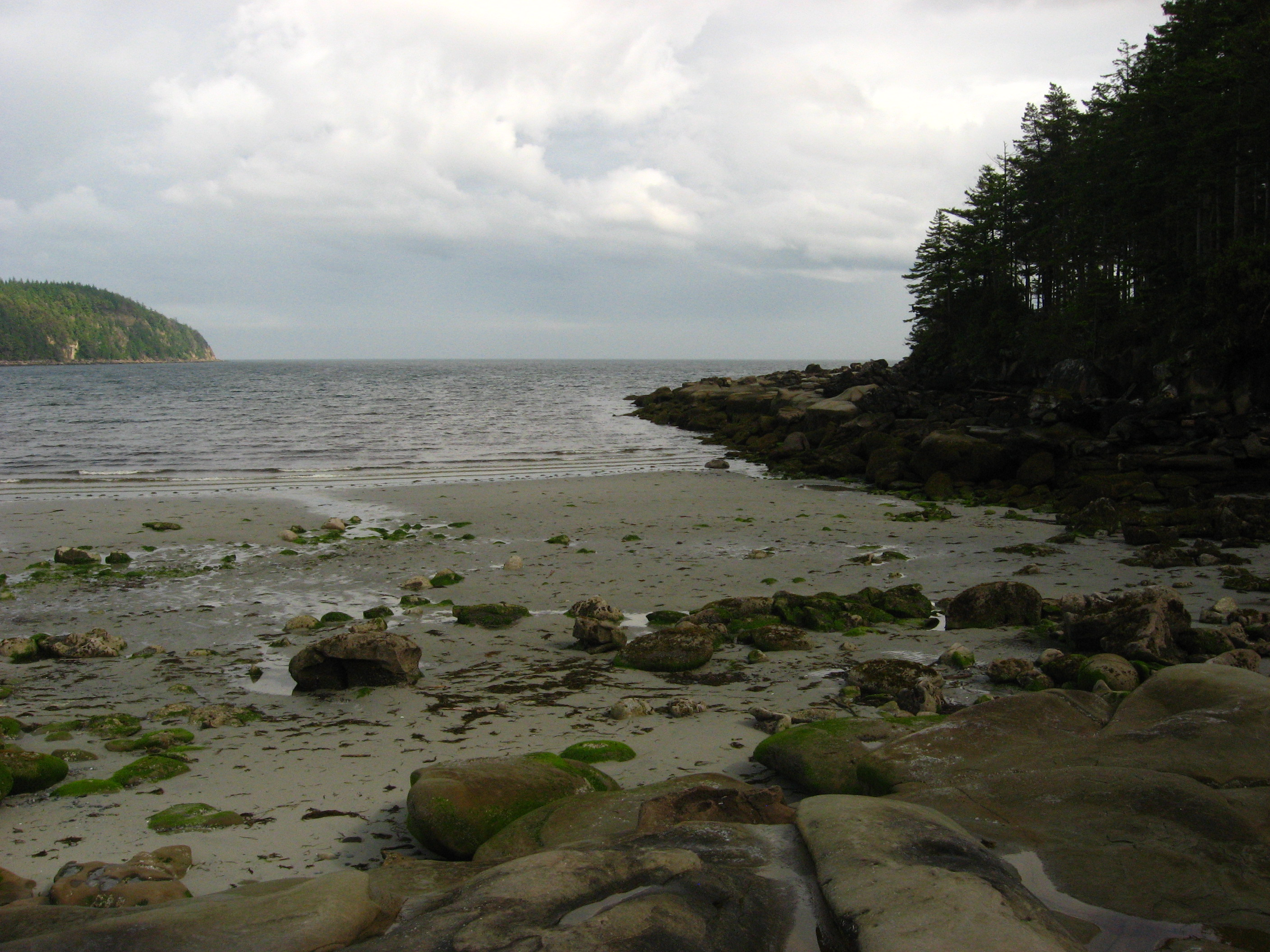
- Tribune Bay

- Location within British Columbia Location within Comox Valley Regional District
- Interactive map of Tribune Bay Provincial Park
- Location: Hornby Island, British Columbia, Canada
- Nearest city: Courtenay
- Coordinates: 49°31′46″N 124°38′31″W
- Area: 96 hectares (240 acres)
- Established: November 2, 1978
- Visitors: 80,000 (in 1987)
- Governing body: BC Parks
- Website: bcparks.ca/tribune-bay-park/

Tribune Bay Provincial Park is a provincial park located on Hornby Island in British Columbia, Canada. It features a broad, crescent-shaped beach of white sand, Tribune Bay (a shallow, warm-water bay), and spring wildflowers. There are opportunities for canoeing, fishing, hiking, tennis, picnicking and open water swimming. Six pit toilets are provided. The park is sometimes referred to as "Little Hawaii", and the bay is considered one of the warmer spots to swim in during the summer.

The bay (and hence the park) was named after HMS Tribune, a ship stationed in British Columbia in 1859–1860 and 1864.

== Facilities ==
Along with the pit toilets, there is a front-country camping area with 75 lots. There are also camping sites with electricity, some cabins, and a playground. Reservations for the camping lots are strongly suggested throughout the season.

The day-use area of the park is slightly larger, and has a tennis court, picnic shelters, and outhouses.

== See also ==
- Helliwell Provincial Park
