= BC School Sports =

Sports governing body in British Columbia, Canada

BC School Sports is the governing body for secondary school sports in the province of British Columbia, Canada. It was originally organized in 1965 as the British Columbia Federation of School Athletic Associations (BCFSAA) by a group of interested teachers and administrators. A Constitution was adopted in 1966. Jim Stewart of Coquitlam was the first President. Stewart was elected to the BC School Sports Honour Roll in 1993. Operational support was received from the provincial government (but Provincial support was withdrawn in 2009). During a special general meeting in October 2009, the membership voted to increase fees up to 75% to offset the cost of the provincial government's elimination of funding.

== History ==
The association opened an office in January 1970, with Executive Secretary Don Steen as the first employee. The name was changed to BC School Sports in 1980-81.

The following individuals have been Presidents of the Association:

- 1968-70 James Stewart (Coquitlam)
- 1970-71 Ed Carlin (White Rock)
- 1971-72 Dan Doyle (Coquitlam)
- 1972-73 Neal Henderson (Victoria)
- 1973-74 Court Brousson (Victoria)
- 1974-75 Jack Armour (Vancouver)
- 1975-76 David Lynn (Williams Lake)
- 1976-78 Ray Towers (Coquitlam)
- 1978-79 Bob Stebbings (Delta)
- 1979-80 Rick Mark (Victoria)
- 1980-81 Terry Cotton (Ladysmith)
- 1981-82 Barry Wright (Westbank)
- 1982-84 Bob Price (Chemainus)
- 1984-85 Keith Lanphear (Cassiar)
- 1985-86 Bob Jackson (Richmond)
- 1986-87 Marty Cross (Prince George)
- 1987-88 Bob Ferguson (Creston)
- 1988-90 Collin York (Surrey)
- 1990-91 Dave Derpak (Nakusp)
- 1991-92 Ken Bartel (Kelowna)
- 1992-93 Jill Philipchuk (Vancouver)
- 1993-95 Dave Bingham (Winfield)
- 1995-96 Bob Lindsay (Kelowna)
- 1996-99 Jo Ann Ward (Coquitlam)
- 1999-03 Jeanine Stannard (Victoria)
- 2003-05 Brian Lynch (West Vancouver)
- 2005-06 Philip Cizmic (Campbell River)
- 2006-12 Raj Puri (Surrey)
- 2012-16 Deb Whitten (Victoria)
- 2016- Mike Allina (Vancouver)
