= Hornby Island =

Island and commumity in British Columbia, Canada

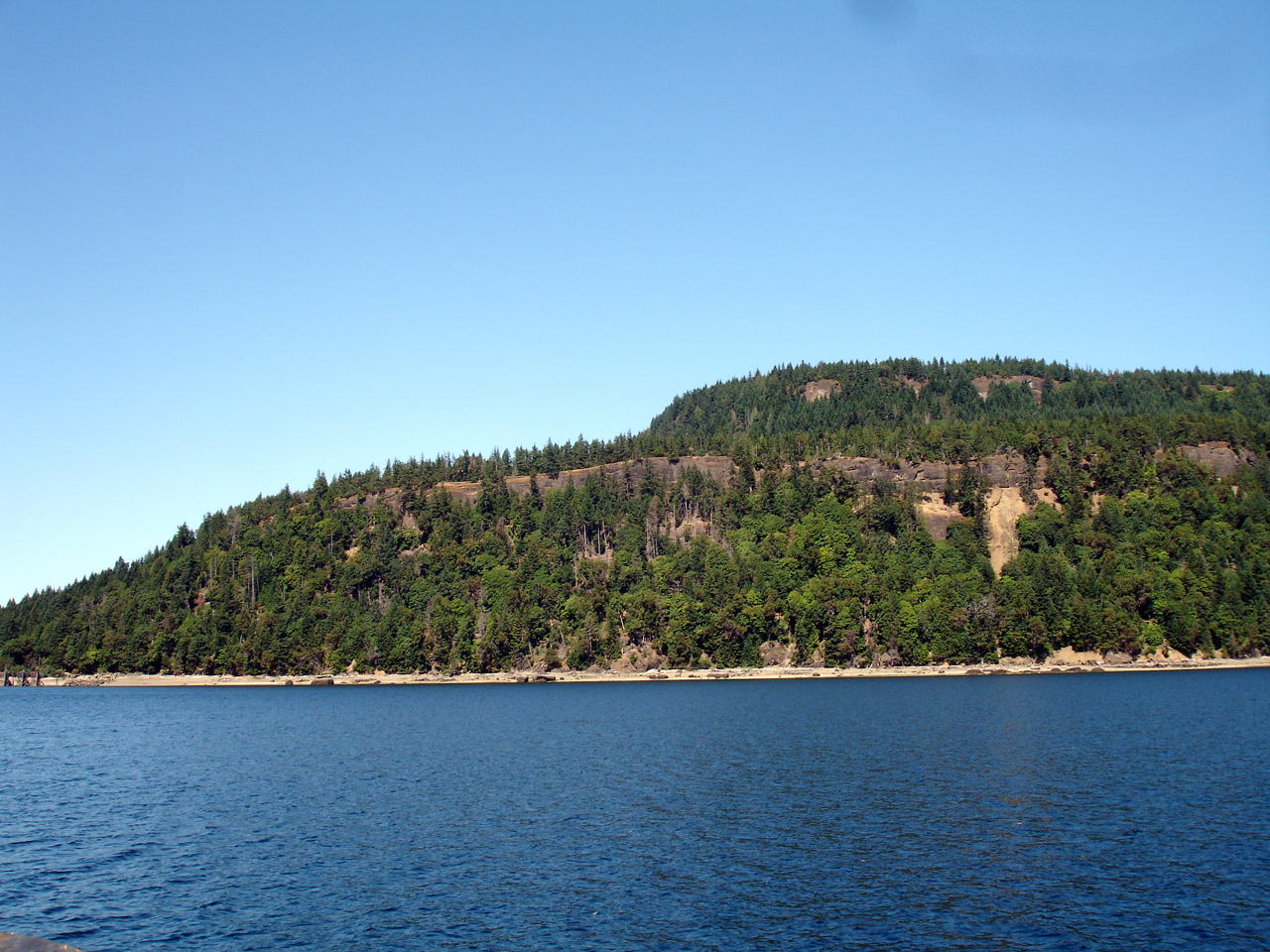
- Hornby Island as seen from the Hornby-Denman ferry

- Location in British Columbia Location in Comox Valley Regional District

Geography
- Location: Salish Sea
- Coordinates: 49°31′10″N 124°40′0″W
- Archipelago: Gulf Islands
- Area: 29.96 km^{2} (11.57 sq mi)

Administration
- Canada
- Province: British Columbia
- Regional district: Comox Valley

Demographics
- Population: 1,225 (2021)
- Pop. density: 40.9/km^{2} (105.9/sq mi)

Hornby Island of British Columbia, Canada, is one of the two northernmost Gulf Islands, the other being Denman Island. It is located near Vancouver Island's Comox Valley.

There is a small community of 1,225 residents (as of the 2021 census) on the island. It is home to many artists, retired professionals, small business owners, remote workers, and young families. During the summer months, the island's population quadruples in size. The shoulder seasons are a preferred time for hiking, mountain biking, marine activities, weddings, and retreats. Most people reach the island by ferries from Buckley Bay, Vancouver Island. A growing number of private boats also visit through mooring at the Ford Cove Marina or anchoring at Tribune Bay. The closest airport is Comox Valley Airport in Comox, which provides regional, national, and international service.

Parks and amenities on Hornby include Tribune Bay Provincial Park, Helliwell Provincial Park, Ford's Cove, and Whaling Station Bay. The island is also a popular mountain biking destination, with a variety of designated trails in Mount Geoffrey Regional Nature Park, Mount Geoffrey Escarpment Provincial Park, and on Crown Land. The total land area is 29.92 square kilometres (11.55 sq mi), of which 40% is parkland.

== Island geology and history ==
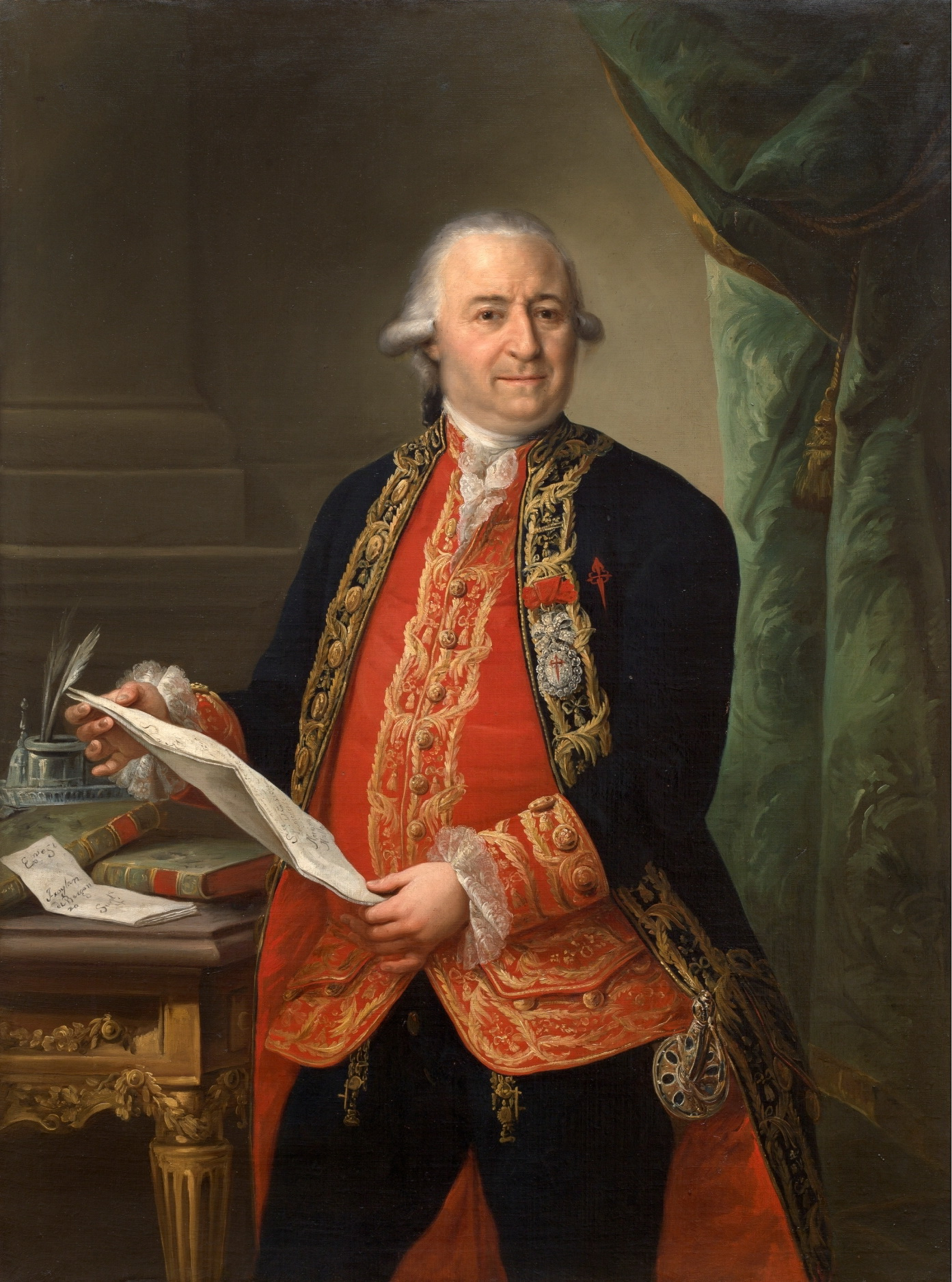
Pedro López de Lerena, Count of Lerena

The island is geographically distinctive as it was formed by post-glacial rebound with the retreat of the last ice age. Before the arrival of European settlers, the island was inhabited by the Pentlatch, a Coast Salish First Nations band who called the Island Ja-dai-aich, meaning The Outer Island. The island was found and named Isla de Lerena during the 1791 voyage of the Spanish ship Santa Saturnina, under Juan Carrasco and José María Narváez. The name honours the Spanish Finance Minister, Don Pedro López de Lerena, Count of Lerena, who supported the movement of Spanish Ships over there. In 1850 the British renamed it after Rear Admiral Phipps Hornby, then Commander of the Pacific Station.

== Vegetation and soils ==
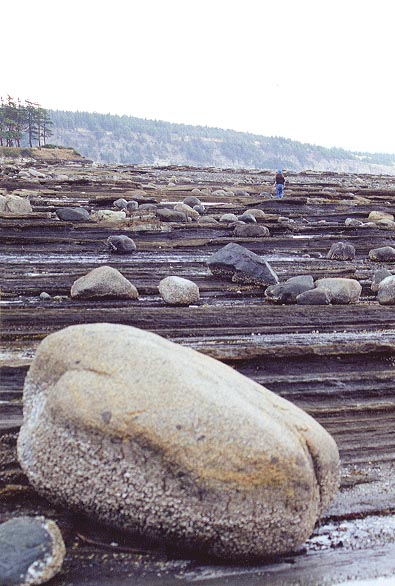
A rocky beach on Hornby Island

Hornby Island is mostly covered by mixed forest dominated by Douglas-fir. Western red cedar, western hemlock, grand fir and lodgepole pine are the other large conifers present. The smaller Pacific yew is scattered in the understorey. The arbutus, a broadleaf evergreen species, is plentiful. Broadleaf deciduous trees include bigleaf maple, red alder, black cottonwood, Pacific flowering dogwood, cascara and several species of willow. Populations of Garry oak occur on the southern end of the island and at Helliwell Provincial Park. Only about 260 acres (1.1 km^{2}) of undisturbed stands for older forest have been identified on Hornby Island, which amount to roughly 3.5% of the island's area. There are roughly 1,330 acres (540 ha) of older second-growth stands on the island, which amount to 19% of the island.

The island's soils have developed from marine deposits of variable texture, except for the higher elevations and steeper slopes where weathered clastic sedimentary rock provides the parent material. Most of Hornby's soils are sandy or gravelly, but some deep black loams occur in the northwestern part and many of the sands at the southern end have loam-textured topsoils. Podzols are common and the bleached sand grains associated with their eluvial (A_{2}, Ae or E) horizons lend a salt-and-pepper appearance to many forest trails. In most cases, though, the E is not very thick and may be discontinuous. On this account, the soils were mostly classified as Brown Podzolic in a soil survey published in 1959. All of the island's soils are strongly acidic in their natural state except for those which have developed on shoreline shell middens.

== Fossils ==
The Late Cretaceous Northumberland Formation is exposed in the northern and western part of the island. Fossil collectors have found ammonite and baculite fossils at Boulder Point on Hornby Island. A species of saurodontid fish (previously considered a pterosaur) called Gwawinapterus was identified based on a fossil found on a beach on Hornby Island. An actual azhdarchoid pterosaur was later identified from the formation, as well as Maaqwi, an early aquatic bird. An incredibly diverse shark community is recorded in shark teeth fossils from the area.
