= Oyster River, British Columbia =

Community in British Columbia, Canada

Oyster River
- Location of Oyster River in British Columbia Oyster River (British Columbia) Oyster River (Canada)
- Coordinates: 49°52′22″N 125°07′48″W
- Country: Canada
- Province: British Columbia

Oyster River is a small community on Vancouver Island, British Columbia, located between Campbell River (12 km (7.5 mi) to the north) and Black Creek (3 km (1.9 mi) to the south) mainly along or close to Highway 19A. Located just north of the estuary of the Oyster River, it is home to around 1,500 people and a very small commercial sector.

== Location ==
Oyster River is named after the river that draws its southerly border with Black Creek, a community which is part of the Comox Valley Regional District. Three northbound bridges cross the river and signify the entrance into both Oyster River and the exit from Comox Valley Regional District. Between Oyster River's northerly boundary and the Campbell River city limits lies another small community called Stories Beach. Oyster River and Stories Beach collectively make up Strathcona Regional District 'Area D', an area which is independent of the Municipality of Campbell River, but which collaborates with the municipality frequently to provide residents with basic services.

== Businesses and commerce ==
Small campgrounds and resorts dominate the small community's economy with some notable ones being Salmon Point Resort and Pacific Playgrounds (technically located in Black Creek, but on the banks of the Oyster River.) The only major business in the area is a small grocery store, Discovery Foods. It is owned and operated by three local families and it provides part-time and full-time employment for many local residents of both Black Creek and Oyster River. In the same complex as Discovery Foods, a restaurant, a liquor store, and a medical clinic have been set up.

== Notable features ==
The Oyster River itself is a popular swimming and fishing spot all throughout the summer months. There is access at Highway 19, 19a, 19b (old bridge), York Road. The Oyster River estuary, as well as the entire oceanfront of the community, are home to a large run of pink salmon that return every year.

== Climate ==
Oyster River has a warm-summer Mediterranean Climate because both July and August has less than 40 mm of rain.

Climate data for Oyster River UBC (1981–2010)
Month	Jan	Feb	Mar	Apr	May	Jun	Jul	Aug	Sep	Oct	Nov	Dec	Year
Record high °C (°F)	15.6 (60.1)	17.0 (62.6)	19.0 (66.2)	28.5 (83.3)	30.5 (86.9)	33.5 (92.3)	34.5 (94.1)	34.5 (94.1)	30.0 (86.0)	23.0 (73.4)	17.2 (63.0)	20.0 (68.0)	34.5 (94.1)
Mean daily maximum °C (°F)	6.2 (43.2)	7.4 (45.3)	9.8 (49.6)	13.2 (55.8)	17.1 (62.8)	20.2 (68.4)	22.6 (72.7)	22.5 (72.5)	18.9 (66.0)	12.8 (55.0)	8.3 (46.9)	5.8 (42.4)	13.7 (56.7)
Daily mean °C (°F)	3.3 (37.9)	3.8 (38.8)	5.6 (42.1)	8.3 (46.9)	12.0 (53.6)	15.1 (59.2)	17.3 (63.1)	17.2 (63.0)	13.6 (56.5)	8.9 (48.0)	5.2 (41.4)	3.2 (37.8)	9.5 (49.1)
Mean daily minimum °C (°F)	0.3 (32.5)	0.1 (32.2)	1.5 (34.7)	3.4 (38.1)	6.9 (44.4)	9.8 (49.6)	11.7 (53.1)	11.7 (53.1)	8.2 (46.8)	5.0 (41.0)	2.0 (35.6)	0.5 (32.9)	5.1 (41.2)
Record low °C (°F)	−16.7 (1.9)	−13.0 (8.6)	−8.0 (17.6)	−3.3 (26.1)	−2.5 (27.5)	1.7 (35.1)	4.4 (39.9)	3.9 (39.0)	−1.1 (30.0)	−6.0 (21.2)	−15.0 (5.0)	−16.1 (3.0)	−16.7 (1.9)
Average precipitation mm (inches)	196.9 (7.75)	151.9 (5.98)	143.9 (5.67)	87.2 (3.43)	64.6 (2.54)	54.7 (2.15)	36.4 (1.43)	39.0 (1.54)	48.9 (1.93)	153.8 (6.06)	232.6 (9.16)	224.5 (8.84)	1,434.5 (56.48)
Average rainfall mm (inches)	182.0 (7.17)	144.2 (5.68)	139.3 (5.48)	87.2 (3.43)	64.6 (2.54)	54.7 (2.15)	36.4 (1.43)	39.0 (1.54)	48.9 (1.93)	152.9 (6.02)	228.4 (8.99)	215.9 (8.50)	1,393.5 (54.86)
Average snowfall cm (inches)	14.9 (5.9)	7.8 (3.1)	4.6 (1.8)	0.0 (0.0)	0.0 (0.0)	0.0 (0.0)	0.0 (0.0)	0.0 (0.0)	0.0 (0.0)	0.9 (0.4)	4.1 (1.6)	8.6 (3.4)	40.9 (16.1)
Average precipitation days (≥ 0.2 mm)	19.5	15.9	18.5	15.8	14.3	12.9	9.0	8.6	9.1	18.0	20.0	18.9	180.4
Average rainy days (≥ 0.2 mm)	18.2	15.2	18.1	15.8	14.3	12.9	9.0	8.6	9.1	17.9	19.5	18.0	176.6
Average snowy days (≥ 0.2 cm)	2.3	1.5	1.0	0.0	0.0	0.0	0.0	0.0	0.0	0.1	1.0	1.4	7.4
Source: Environment Canada

== See also ==
- Norm Lake
