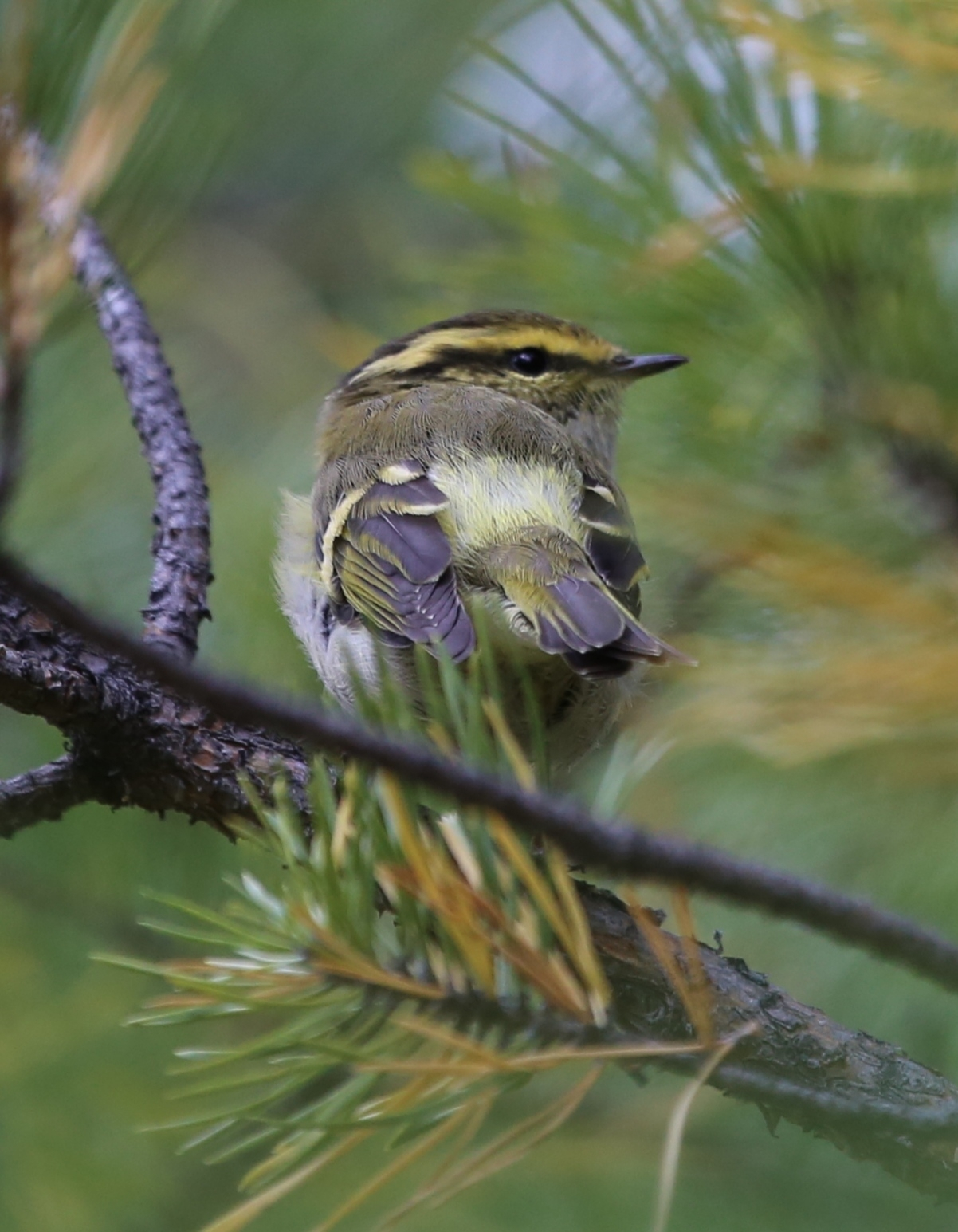
- With the pale yellow rump visible. Buryatia, Russia.

Conservation status
- Least Concern (IUCN 3.1)

Scientific classification
- Kingdom: Animalia
- Phylum: Chordata
- Class: Aves
- Order: Passeriformes
- Family: Phylloscopidae
- Genus: Phylloscopus
- Species: P. proregulus

Binomial name
- Phylloscopus proregulus (Pallas, 1811)
- Range of P. proregulus Breeding Non-breeding

= Pallas's leaf warbler =

Species of migratory passerine bird

Pallas's leaf warbler (Phylloscopus proregulus) or Pallas's warbler is a bird that breeds in mountain forests from southern Siberia east to northern Mongolia and northeast China. It is named after the German zoologist Peter Simon Pallas, who first formally described it. This leaf warbler is strongly migratory, wintering mainly in south China and adjacent areas of southeast Asia, although in recent decades increasing numbers have been found in Europe in autumn.

Pallas's leaf warbler is one of the smallest Palearctic warblers, with a relatively large head and short tail. It has greenish upperparts and white underparts, a lemon-yellow rump, and yellow double wingbars, supercilia and central crown stripe. It is similar in appearance to several other Asian warblers, including some that were formerly considered to be subspecies of it, although its distinctive vocalisations aid identification.

The female builds a cup nest in a tree or bush, and incubates the four to six eggs, which hatch after 12–13 days. The chicks are fed mainly by the female and fledge when they are 12–14 days old; both parents then bring food for about a week. Pallas's leaf warbler is insectivorous, feeding on the adults, larvae and pupae of small insects and spiders. Birds forage in bushes and trees, picking items from leaves or catching prey in short flights or while hovering. The Pallas's leaf warbler has a large range, and its numbers are believed to be stable. It therefore is evaluated as of "least concern" by the International Union for Conservation of Nature (IUCN).

== Taxonomy ==
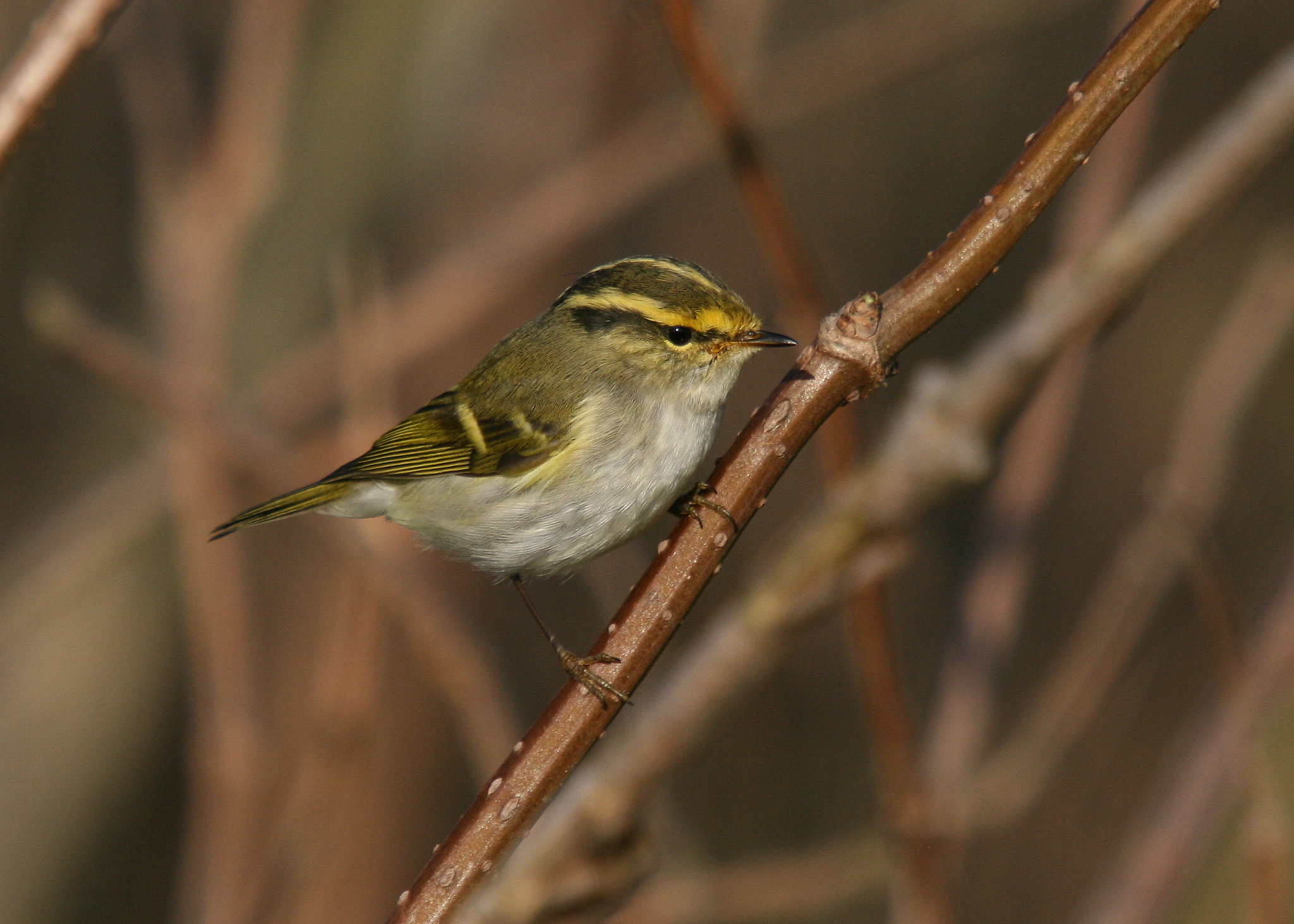
Pallas's leaf warbler on Heligoland, Germany

The English name of Pallas's leaf warbler commemorates the German zoologist Peter Simon Pallas, who found it on the Ingoda River in Siberia in May 1772. (Note: Pallas led a scientific expedition to Siberia, sponsored by Catherine the Great, between 1768 and 1774.) He named the new species as Motacilla proregulus when he finally published his findings in 1811. The current genus name Phylloscopus is from Ancient Greek phullon, "leaf", and skopos, "seeker" (from skopeo, "to watch"). The specific proregulus is from Greek pro, "close to", and the name regulus, referring to the similar-looking goldcrest, Regulus regulus.

The genus Phylloscopus, first described by German zoologist Friedrich Boie in 1826, comprises about 50 species of small insectivorous Old World woodland warblers that are either greenish or brown above and yellowish, white or buff below. The genus was formerly part of the Old World warbler family Sylvidae, but has now been split off as a separate family, the Phylloscopidae.

Within the genus, Pallas's leaf warbler is one of a group of similar tiny Asiatic species characterised by a yellow rump, a strong supercilium (stripe over the eye), double wing bars and a stripe on the crown of the head, once separated as the genus Abrornis but currently retained in Phylloscopus.

Pallas's leaf warbler was itself formerly treated as a complex of several subspecies, with the nominate subspecies P. p. proregulus breeding in northern Asia, and other subspecies breeding much further south at high altitudes in the mountains from the western Himalayas east to western China (Yunnan and north to Gansu and Hebei). Although field naturalists, such as Gilbert White in the 18th century and William Edwin Brooks in the 19th, had noted the importance of calls in separating often very similar-looking leaf warblers, for many years their views were not always accepted by the ornithological establishment. More recently, vocalisations have become increasingly important in taxonomy. In the case of the former subspecies of Pallas's leaf warbler, even though they differ only slightly in plumage, the southern forms are very distinctive vocally. Their songs and calls differ from those of the nominate race, and DNA analysis from 2006 has confirmed these forms to be sufficiently distinct that they are now treated as separate species, leaving Pallas's leaf warbler as a monotypic taxon. The split species are:

- Lemon-rumped warbler Phylloscopus chloronotus. Himalayas, wintering at lower altitudes. Two subspecies, P. c. chloronotus and P. c. simlaensis.
- Sichuan leaf warbler Phylloscopus forresti. South-central China (Sichuan, northern Yunnan), wintering south to Indochina; monotypic.
- Gansu leaf warbler Phylloscopus kansuensis. Central western China (Gansu), winter range not yet known; monotypic.
- Chinese leaf warbler Phylloscopus yunnanensis (synonym P. sichuanensis). North-central China, wintering southwest China, Indochina; monotypic.

The breeding ranges of the Gansu leaf warbler and the Chinese leaf warbler overlap in southern Gansu, but the species are separated ecologically: the Gansu leaf warbler is found in taller forest habitats and the Chinese leaf warbler uses lower, often scrubby habitats. "Lemon-rumped warbler" was sometimes used as synonym for Pallas's leaf warbler before the species' split. Pallas's leaf warbler appears to have diverged from the Chinese leaf warbler 4.1–5.5 million years ago, and from its other former subspecies about 1.7–3.2 million years ago.

== Description ==
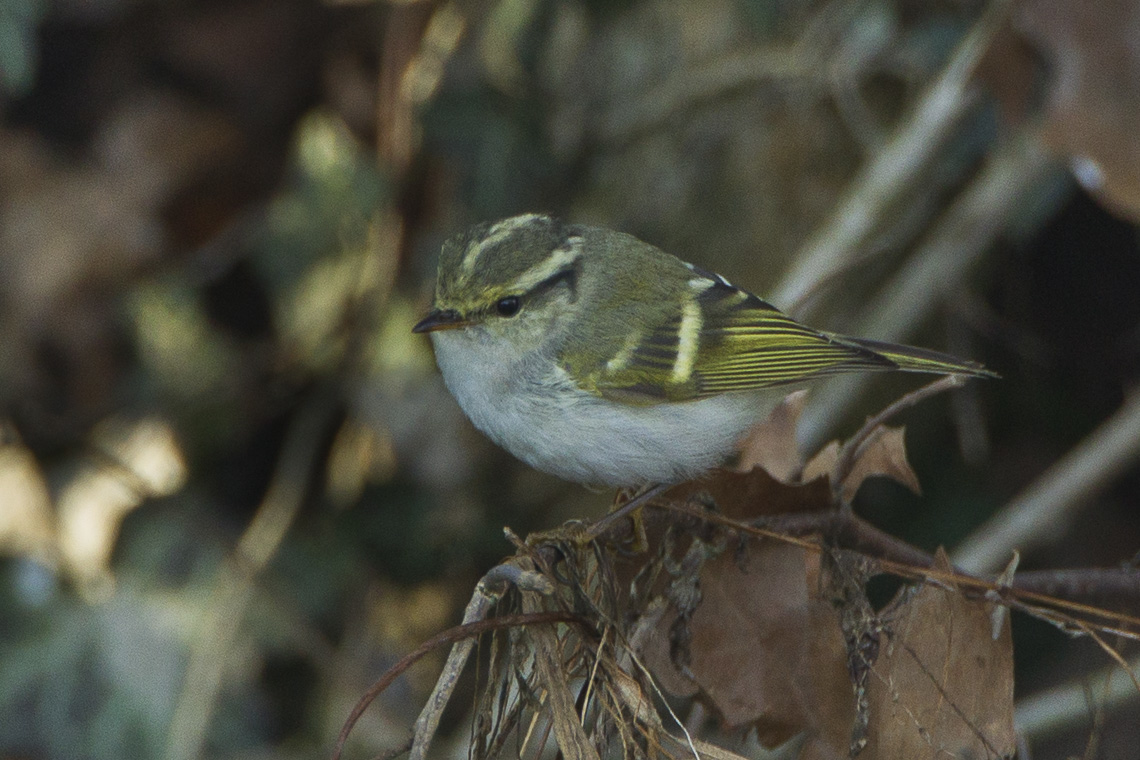
Showing head stripes. Wintering bird at Treviso, Italy.

Pallas's leaf warbler is one of the smallest warblers, with a large head and short tail. At 9–10 centimetres (3.5–3.9 in) long and 4–7 grams (0.14–0.25 oz) in weight, it is slightly smaller than a yellow-browed warbler and barely any larger than a goldcrest. It has greenish upperparts and white underparts, but is very striking, with prominent pale yellow double wingbars on the wing covert feathers, bold yellow supercilia and central crown stripe, and a lemon-yellow rump. The bill is blackish-brown with a yellowish tinge to the cutting edges and the base of the lower mandible, the iris is brown, and the legs are brown with a green or greyish tinge. Although the yellow rump is obvious when a bird is low in vegetation or hovering, it can otherwise be hard to see.

In Asia, Pallas's leaf warbler can be distinguished from its former subspecies by its yellower head stripes, wingbars and throat as well as its different vocalisations. Other yellow-rumped Asiatic warblers resemble Pallas's; buff-barred and Brooks's leaf warblers are larger, duller green above and less strongly marked, and their wing bars are buff and white respectively, not yellow. Ashy-throated warbler has grey head markings, face and throat, and pale yellow underparts.

The sexes of Pallas's leaf warbler have similar plumage, but non-breeding birds are somewhat brighter green above and have broad, bright fringes to their flight feathers. Juveniles are like the adults, but have a brown tinge to the upperparts, greyish-white underparts and a duller supercilium. Adults have a complete post-breeding moult in August or September before migrating south. Juveniles and pre-breeding adults have a partial moult in March or April, replacing all the body plumage and some tail feathers.

The song of Pallas's leaf warbler is delivered from a concealed perch near the top of a tall tree. It is strong and prolonged, with a medley of whistles, tirrit-tirrt-tirrit-terchee-choo-choo-chee-chee-chee or similar, with some phrases reminiscent of a canary, and interspersed trills. It lasts 2–4 seconds and may be heard in the winter quarters as well as from breeding birds. The call is a short, soft dju-ee. In contrast, the former subspecies have quite different songs, with sustained rattles for several seconds, or sometimes minutes. Their calls are typically sharp and monosyllabic.

== Distribution and habitat ==
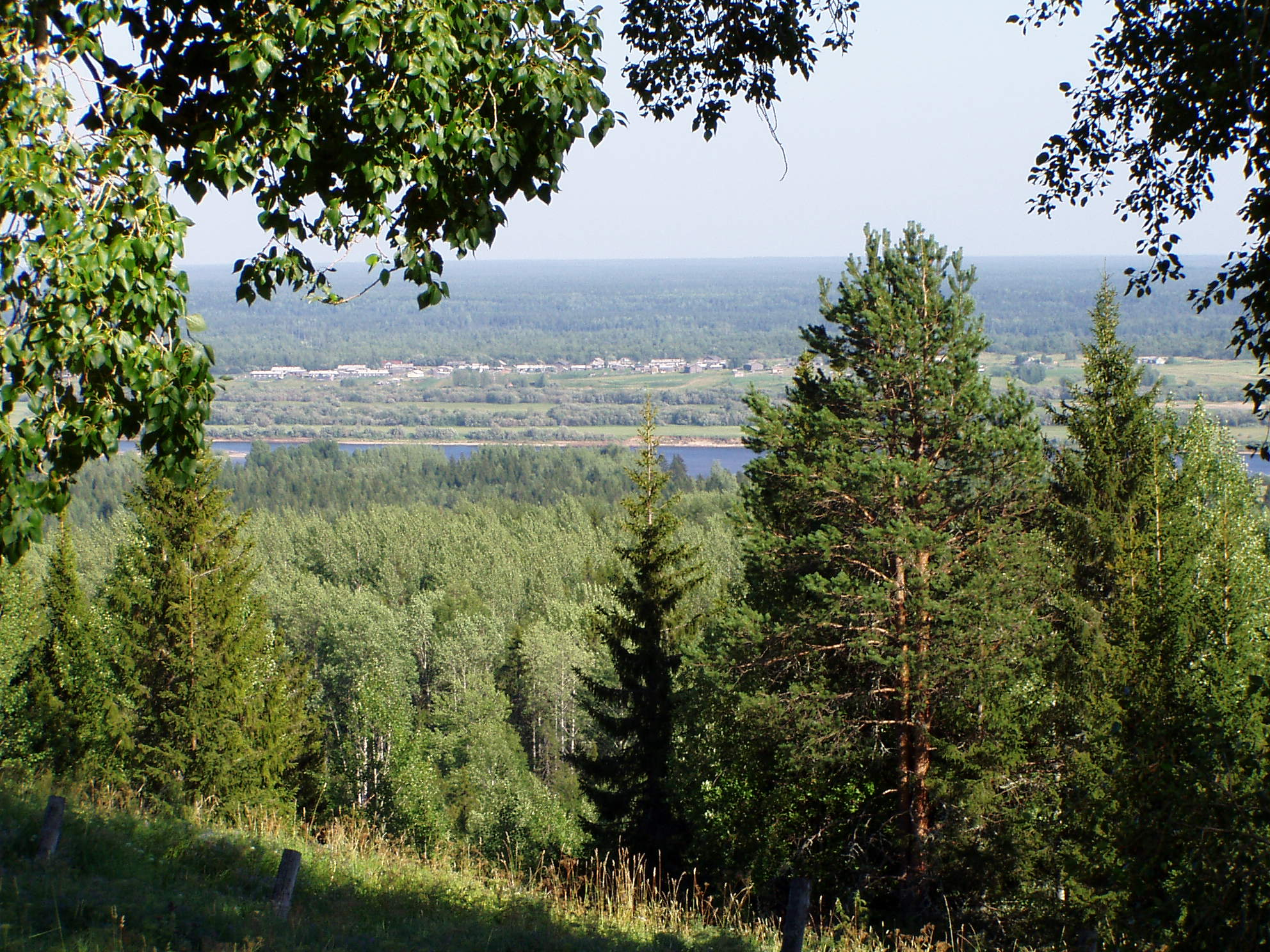
Siberian taiga woodland

Pallas's leaf warbler breeds in Siberia from the Altai Mountains east to the Sea of Okhotsk, northern Mongolia, northeast China and possibly North Korea. It is strongly migratory and winters mainly in subtropical south China, northern Thailand and elsewhere in northeastern Indochina. It is rare but annual in Japan.

Pallas's leaf warbler breeds in coniferous taiga forests including fir, spruce, pine and larch, or in mixed forest with willow, alder, and a high percentage of conifers. In southern and far-eastern Russia, it breeds from sea level up to 1,500–1,700 metres (4,900–5,600 ft). In winter, it uses a wider range of habitats, including broadleaf forest and scrub as well as conifers, and can be found in river valleys down to sea level.

=== Other movements ===
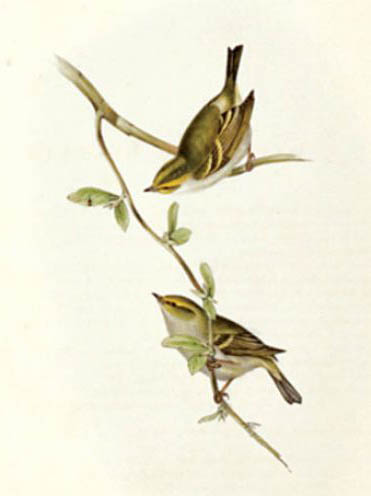
From John Gould's 1837 illustration of "Dalmatian Regulus" (Note: Gould did the preliminary sketch, and his wife Elizabeth completed the detailed final painting.)

Pallas's leaf warbler now occurs regularly in Europe in autumn. The first known European record was shot in 1829 in Dalmatia, now Croatia, but John Gould, who formally described it, did not realise the species had already been discovered in Asia, and named it as the "Dalmatian Regulus" Regulus modestus. The German ornithologist Heinrich Gätke, who moved to the then-British island of Heligoland in 1837 and stayed there for some fifty years, subsequently showed that several Asiatic species, including an occasional Pallas's leaf warbler, were regularly found there in autumn.

In the far west of Europe, the UK's first Pallas's leaf warbler was shot in 1896, although it was not until 1951 that the second was found. Thereafter, this species became increasingly common, ceasing to be a national rarity at the end of 1990. In 2003, for example, 313 were recorded in Britain. Pallas's leaf warbler also occurs at least annually in Sweden, Finland and Denmark.

Most Pallas's leaf warblers found in Europe are first-year birds, and several reasons for the large increase in numbers in autumn have been proposed. In the past, these warblers were widely considered to be vagrants or reverse migrants, but were more recently thought to be undertaking a regular migration, taking advantage of the mild oceanic climate on the western fringes of Europe for overwintering. A flaw in that theory is that many birds should winter in Spain, particularly in the northwest, but Pallas's leaf warbler is rare in that country and tends to occur in the east. Spanish ornithologist Eduardo de Juana has therefore proposed that once the warblers reach northwest Europe, they then reorientate to a south easterly direction.

Outside Europe, Pallas's leaf warbler has been recorded as a vagrant in north Africa (Tunisia and Morocco), western Asia (Israel, Turkey and Iran), central Asia (Uzbekistan and Tajikistan), southeast Asia (Bangladesh and Taiwan), and Alaska.

== Behaviour ==
Pallas's leaf warbler is not wary but its unobtrusive arboreal lifestyle makes it difficult to observe, particularly in thick foliage. It is constantly in motion, and often hovers briefly like a goldcrest, although more frequently, and may sometimes hang upside-down.

=== Breeding ===
Nesting is from June to July, with eggs laid from mid-June. The nest is built by the female in a conifer, usually next to the trunk at 0.5–10 metres (1.6–32.8 ft) above ground, sometimes in a bush. It is a round or elliptical cup made from twigs, leaves and other vegetation and lined with finer material including feathers, hair or fine grasses. Four to six blue-grey flecked white eggs are laid and incubated by the female. They hatch after 12–13 days, with the chicks fledging when 12–14 days old. They are fed mainly by the female while in the nest, but by both parents for about a week after fledging. In the south of the range, a pair may sometimes raise a second brood. The breeding territory in central Siberia is usually 3–5 hectares (7.4–12.4 acres), infrequently as much as 10 hectares (25 acres).

Pallas's leaf warbler, as with other members of its genus, is a host of the oriental cuckoo, a brood parasite. The cuckoo's egg is similar in appearance, though larger, to those of the host species.

=== Feeding ===
Like its relatives, Pallas's leaf warbler is insectivorous, feeding on the adults, larvae and pupae of small insects including flies, moths and aphids; spiders are also taken. Birds forage in bushes and trees, picking items from leaves or catching prey in short flights or while hovering. When not breeding, they may join mixed-species foraging flocks together with tits, goldcrests and other warblers. In Asia, accompanying species may also include white-eyes, minivets and babblers.

== Status ==
The Pallas's leaf warbler has a large range, and although global population trends have not been quantified, numbers are believed to be stable. This species does not approach the thresholds for the population decline criterion of the IUCN Red List (that is, declining more than 30 percent in ten years or three generations). For these reasons, it is evaluated as of "least concern" by the IUCN.

Pallas's leaf warbler is widespread, common and locally abundant in Russia and northeast China. Breeding densities of up to 35–50 pairs/km^{2} (90–130 pairs/mi^{2}) have been recorded in southeast Russia, with only slightly lower figures in Siberia. It is locally common in parts of its wintering grounds in southeast Asia.

== Cited texts ==
- Baker, Kevin (1997). Warblers of Europe, Asia and North Africa (Helm Identification Guides). London: Helm. ISBN 978-0-7136-3971-1.
