= Reverse migration =

Reverse migration may refer to:

- Reverse migration (birds), a phenomenon in bird migration
- Reverse migration (immunology), the phenomena during inflammation resolution
- Return migration, the returning of migrants to their place of origin
- Repatriation, return of a person to their country of origin
- Remigration, far-right concept of forced mass deportations/ethnic cleaning of people of non-European descent
