= William E. Brooks =

William E. Brooks may refer to:

- William Edwin Brooks (1828–1899), Irish civil engineer and ornithologist
- Bucky Brooks (William Eldridge Brooks, Jr., born 1971), American sportswriter
