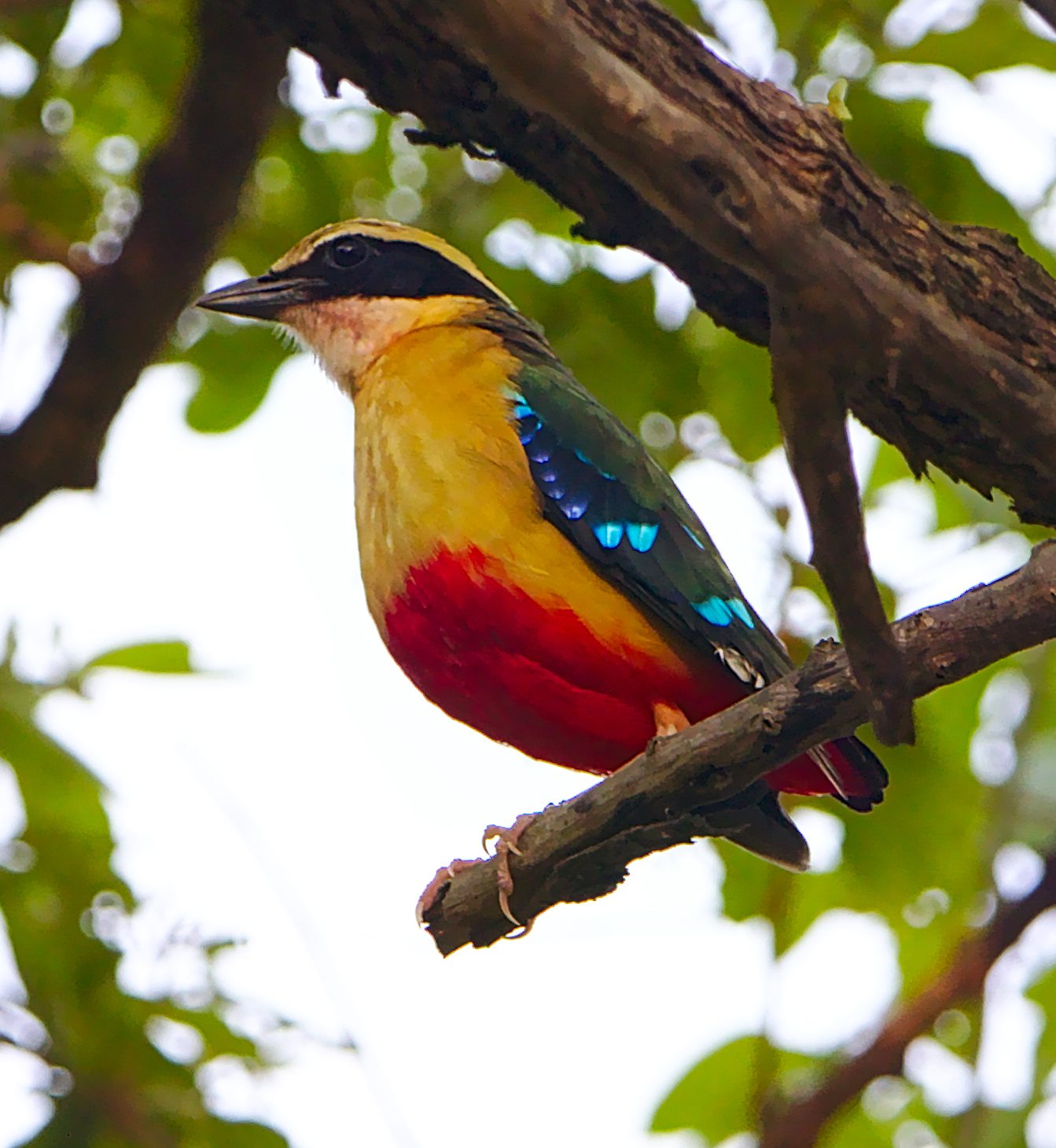
- P. a. longipennis in Zimbabwe

Conservation status
- Least Concern (IUCN 3.1)

Scientific classification
- Kingdom: Animalia
- Phylum: Chordata
- Class: Aves
- Order: Passeriformes
- Family: Pittidae
- Genus: Pitta
- Species: P. angolensis

Binomial name
- Pitta angolensis Vieillot, 1816
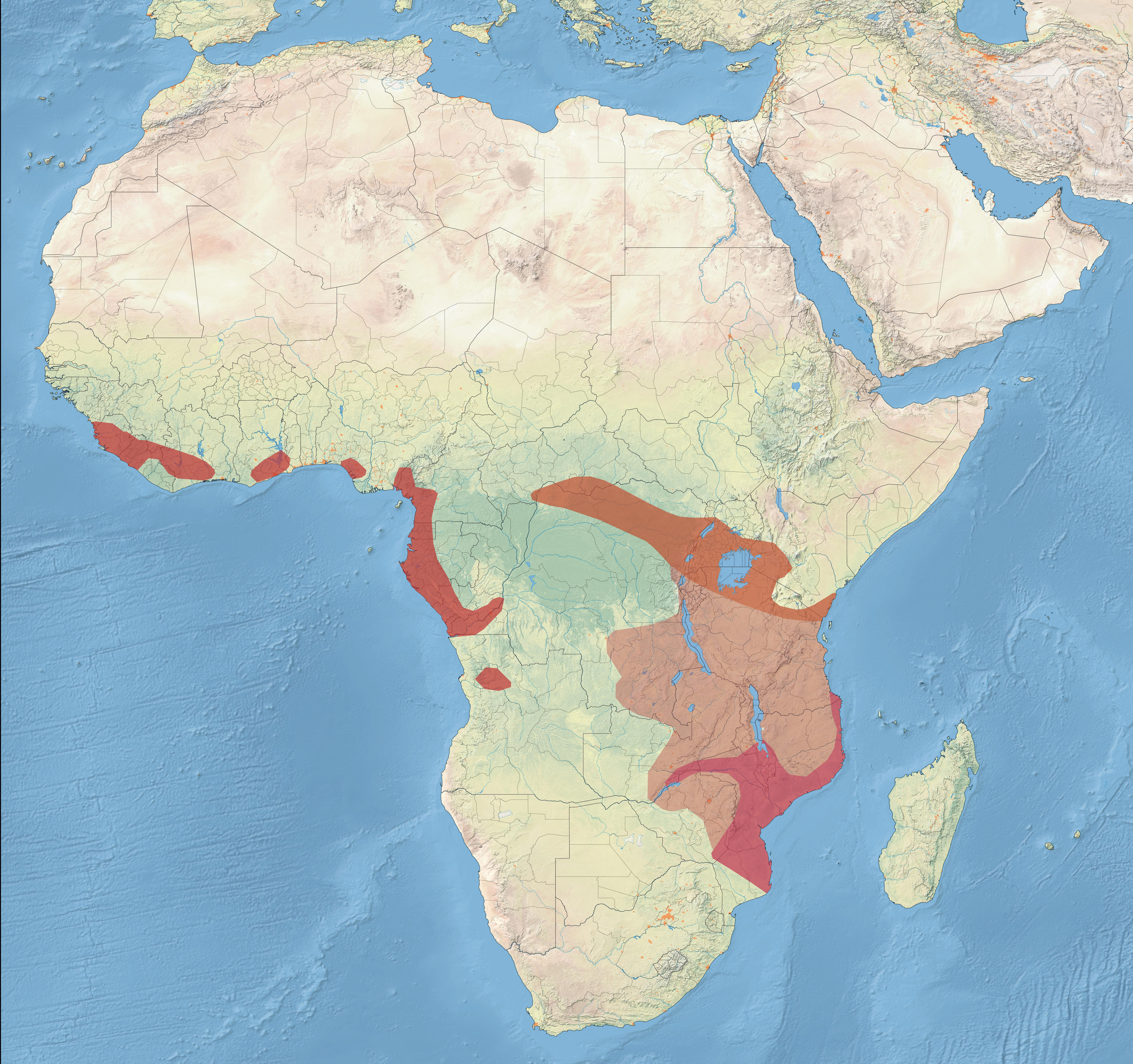
- Range Resident (western races only) Overwintering visitor Passage migrant Breeding visitor

= African pitta =

Species of bird

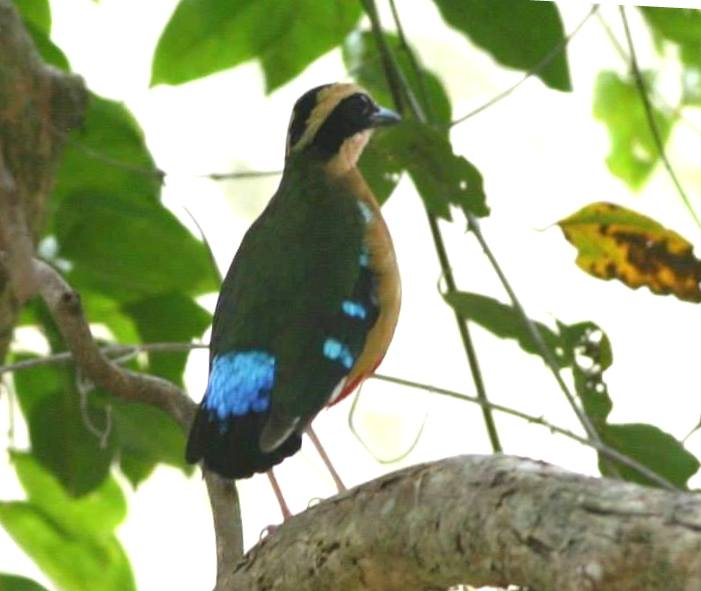

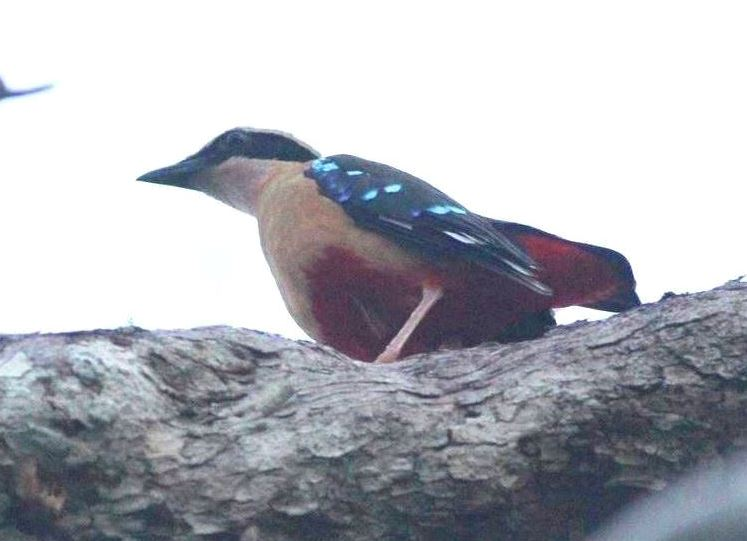
Breeding birds in central Mozambique

The African pitta (Pitta angolensis) is an Afrotropical bird of the family Pittidae. It is a locally common to uncommon species, resident and migratory in the west, and an intra-African migrant between equatorial and southeastern Africa. They are elusive and hard to observe despite their brightly coloured plumage, and their loud, explosive calls are infrequently heard. The plump, somewhat thrush-like birds forage on leaf litter under the canopy of riparian or coastal forest and thickets, or in climax miombo forest. They spend much time during mornings and at dusk scratching in leaf litter or around termitaria, or may stand motionless for long periods. Following rains breeding birds call and display from the mid-canopy.

== Taxonomy ==
The African pitta was described by the French ornithologist Louis Pierre Vieillot in 1816 and given the binomial name Pitta angolensis. Vieillot had introduced the genus Pitta in another book published in the same year.

Three subspecies are recognised:

- P. a. pulih Fraser, 1843 – Sierra Leone to west Cameroon
- P. a. angolensis Vieillot, 1816 – southwest Cameroon to northwest Angola
- P. a. longipennis Reichenow, 1901 – southeast Democratic Republic of the Congo to southwest Tanzania and south to northeast South Africa. Migrates outside the breeding season to Central African Republic, north D.R. Congo and south Kenya.

The closely related green-breasted pitta (Pitta reichenowi) replaces the African pitta in the interior of Africa's tropical rainforests. Together the two species form part of a wide-ranging Old World superspecies, which in relatively recent times colonised Africa from the east.

It has been suggested that the races pulih and angolensis may be conspecific with the green-breasted pitta. The migratory race longipennis may also be a separate species.

== Description ==
The sexes are alike. The crown, face, and ear coverts are solid black, and the throat is pale salmon pink. The broad eyebrow is buff to brownish buff. The flanks, breast, and side of the neck are a mustard yellow, washed olive on the upper breast. Some western birds have the breast very greenish. The wing coverts are deep green and tipped turquoise blue, or black and tipped turquoise and royal blue. The mantle and back are green, and the rump and upper tail coverts pale turquoise blue. The wings are rounded, and the primaries are black with pale and white tips. The bases of the central primaries form a white square, conspicuous in flight or display. The belly and undertail coverts are crimson red, and the legs are pink. Immature birds have a duller plumage with a buffy-pink vent and fawn-coloured throat.

== Distribution and habitat ==
The African pitta is a migratory species to southeastern Africa and the Congo Basin. Its breeding habitat in southeastern Africa is deciduous, lowland riparian forest or thicket with intermittent dense understorey and small sub-canopy glades. On migration however, they may sojourn at any areas of bush or woodland. Fallen dead trees and open branches are favoured perches when performing their peculiar bouncing display. They are more numerous in undisturbed vegetation, and the opening up of the riparian woodland by elephants may reduce their habitat.

=== Migration ===
The race P. a. longipennis spends the austral winter in the western Ugandan forests as far north as Budongo, and coastal Kenya as far north as Gedi ruins. A bird found at Minziro Forest in northwestern Tanzania was in heavy moult, suggestive that the area is on the southeastern fringe of the non-breeding range.

They arrive in southern Africa from late October, though mainly in November and early December. They seldom breed north of the Rukwa Valley and Rufiji River in Tanzania, and no further south than central Mozambique. They depart again in February, though occasionally as late as April. Ringing studies in the Pugu hills and Mufindi have confirmed the timing of northwestward migration. Exhausted and perished birds are regularly found during migration, especially November to December and April to June. Southward migrating birds sometimes overshoot when they follow moist tropical fronts (at night), which may account for their vagrancy in the north-eastern Transvaal and the Zimbabwean plateau. Some reverse migration has been noted after the breeding season.

== Behaviour ==
=== Habits and foraging ===
The African pitta moves about by quick hops. It forages singly on leaf litter, where it scratches to uncover insects and mollusks. It may flit the tail as it walks, and run or jump to a low branch when alarmed, or fly to a high branch where it hides by crouching. It has a fast and direct flight.

It has various call notes, including a querulous scolding skeeow, noted by Moreau, a short, deep trill followed by a wing-clap, and a sproo note, accompanied by a small jump. A croaking call may be heard during migration, and a guttural alarm note has been recorded.

=== Breeding ===
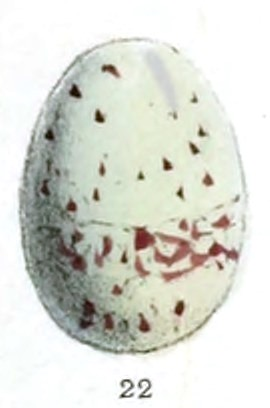
Egg

They are probably monogamous, and display for a few weeks after arrival. Displaying birds utter a far-carrying and explosive quoip as they leap from a lateral branch in mid-canopy. At the same time the wings are opened to reveal the white bases to the primary feathers. Pairs may be spaced 150 meters from one another.

The bulky, untidy nest is a dome-shape structure composed of small sticks, grass and dry leaves. The inside is lined with finer twigs, tendrils and some dry leaves. It is placed 2 to 4 metres (6.6 to 13.1 ft) above ground in the fork of a sapling, or in the thorny and leafy branches of Acacia, Ziziphus, Ximenia or Dichrostachys. A projecting lip beside the side entrance is used as a landing platform. Egg-laying takes place from November to December in southeastern Africa, and the birds fall silent once incubation starts. Three to four eggs are laid. They are white or cream in colour, and flecked with grey undermarkings and liver-red to blackish-brown markings near the thicker end. They measure 28 by 23.5 mm (1.10 by 0.93 in). The nestlings are altricial and nidicolous.

== Status ==
A decline has been noted in the coastal forests of Kenya after 1983. Concern has been expressed about lighted buildings in coastal Tanzania, which might pose a collision risk, as the birds are nocturnal migrants. Breeding habitat in the Zambezi valley has been impacted by elephants and agricultural expansion. Habitat loss and fragmentation is ongoing.

== Monograph ==
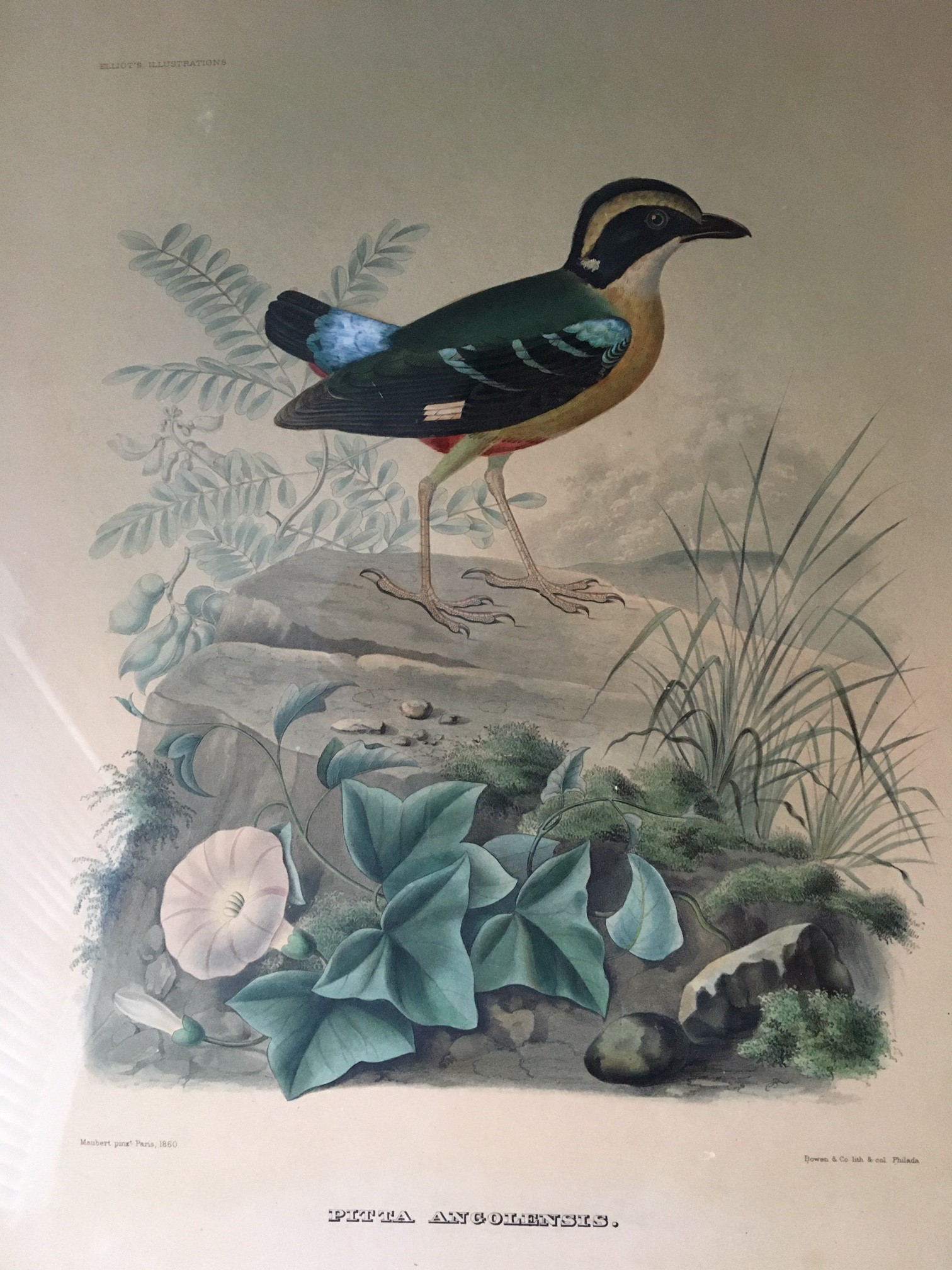
Pitta Angolensis by Daniel Giraud Elliot in 1893

In 1893, Daniel Giraud Elliot, an American zoologist, published a monograph of the Pitta angolensis.
