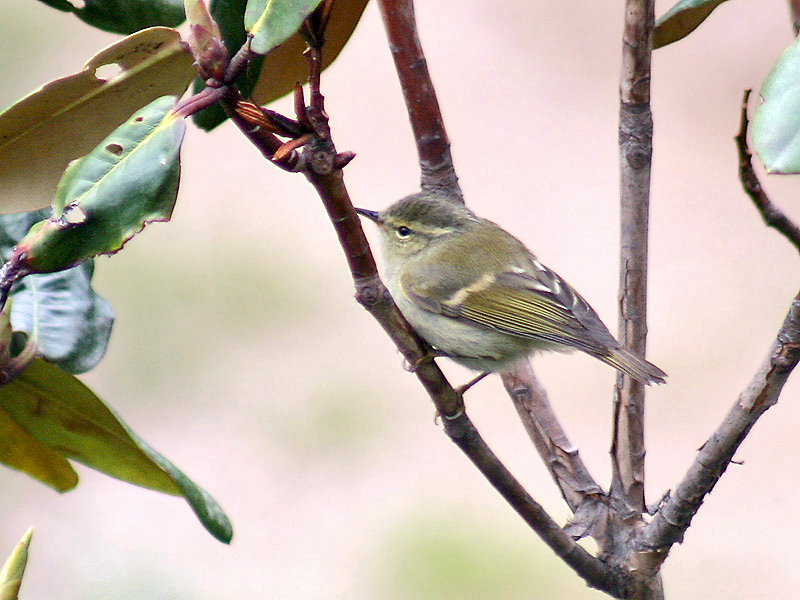
- At 10,000 feet (3,000 m) ASL in Kullu district, Himachal Pradesh, India

Conservation status
- Least Concern (IUCN 3.1)

Scientific classification
- Kingdom: Animalia
- Phylum: Chordata
- Class: Aves
- Order: Passeriformes
- Family: Phylloscopidae
- Genus: Phylloscopus
- Species: P. humei

Binomial name
- Phylloscopus humei (Brooks, 1878)

Subspecies
- Phylloscopus humei humei (Brooks, 1878); Phylloscopus humei mandellii (but see text)
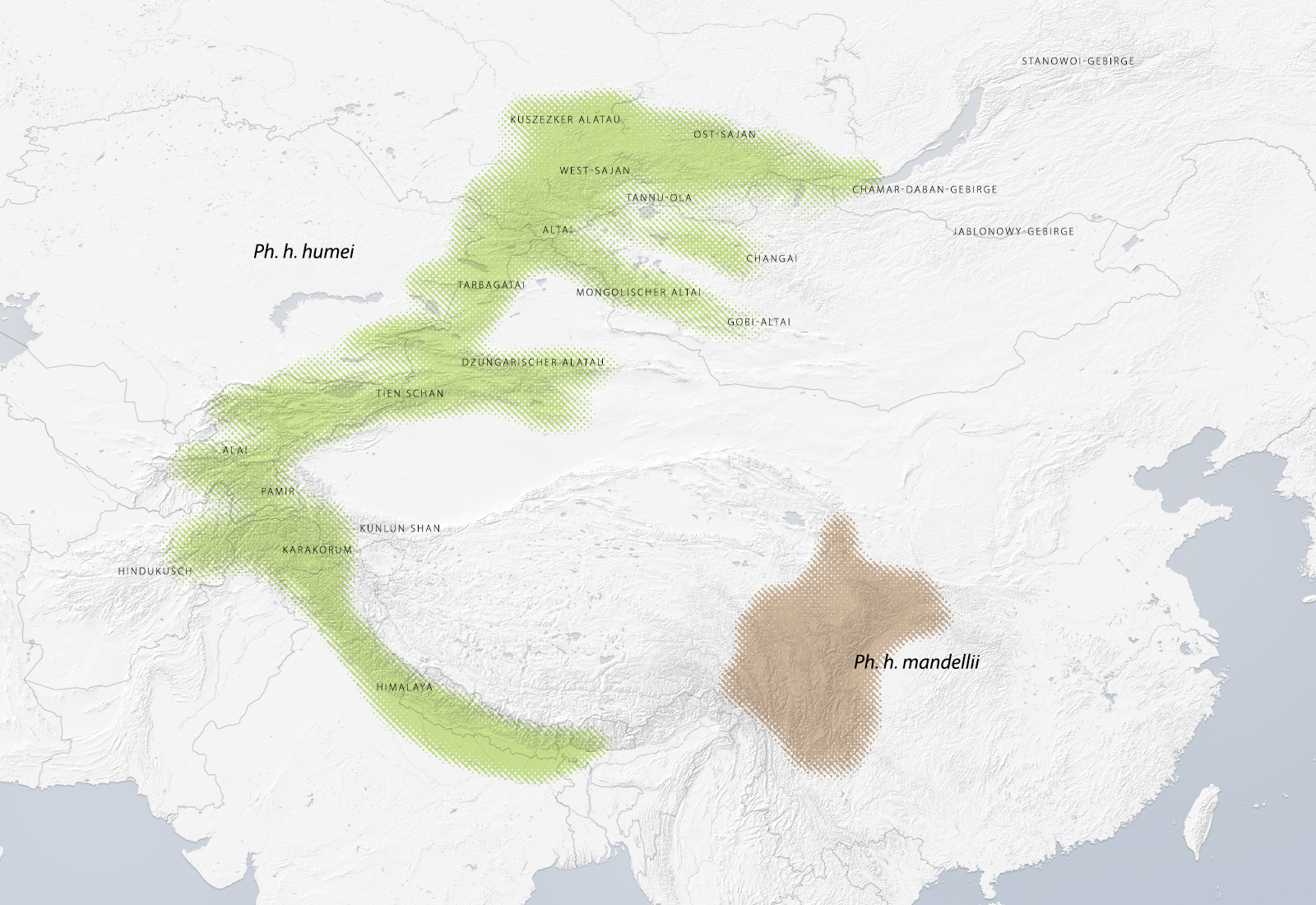
- Range of P. humei

Synonyms
- Phylloscopus inornatus humei (Brooks, 1878); Phylloscopus inornatus mandellii (but see text); Phylloscopus mandellii (but see text)

= Hume's leaf warbler =

Species of bird

Hume's leaf warbler or Hume's warbler (Phylloscopus humei) is a small leaf warbler which breeds in the mountains of inner Asia. This warbler is migratory and winters mainly in India.

The English name and the specific humei commemorate Allan Octavian Hume, a British civil servant and ornithologist based in India. The genus name Phylloscopus is from Ancient Greek phullon, "leaf", and skopos, "seeker" (from skopeo, "to watch"). Like most similar songbirds, it was formerly included in the "Old World warbler" assemblage.

== Description ==
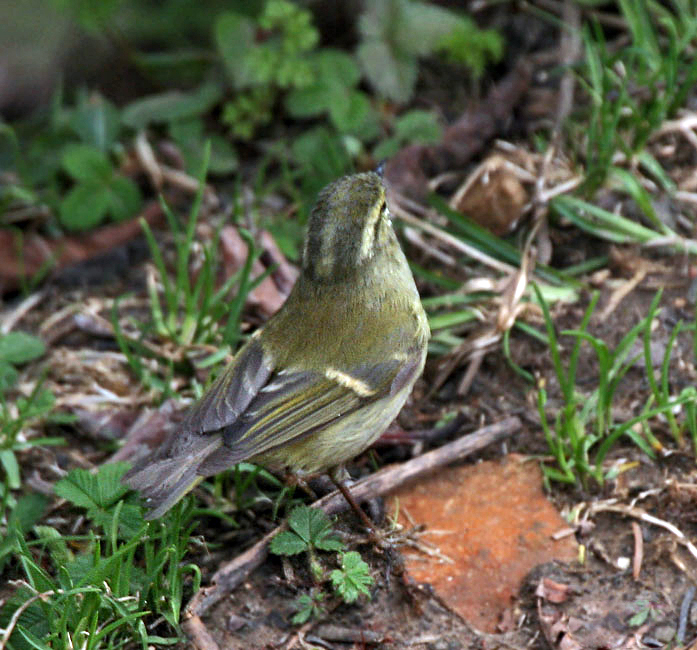
At Biskeri Thatch 11,000 feet (3,400 m) ASL in Kullu district, Himachal Pradesh, India

Hume's leaf warbler is one of the smallest "Old World warblers". Like most other leaf warblers, it has greenish upperparts and off-white underparts. With its long supercilium, crown stripe and yellow-margined tertial remiges, it is very similar to the yellow-browed warbler (P. inornatus). However, it has only one prominent light wing bar, just a faint vestige of the second shorter wing bar, and overall duller colours. It also has a dark lower mandible and legs.

Its song is buzzing and high-pitched. The best distinction from the yellow-browed warbler is the more disyllabic call. While the eastern and western Hume's leaf warblers already show noticeable differences in mtDNA sequence and calls, their songs do not differ; they are reproductively isolated only by allopatry and not usually considered separate species.

== Ecology and evolution ==
This is a common bird of mountain woodlands at altitudes of up to 3,500 m ASL. It occurs from the Hindu Kush and Karakoram east and north to the Tien Shan in China and the Altay Mountains in Mongolia. The completely allopatric subspecies mandellii (Mandell's leaf warbler or eastern Hume's warbler) – sometimes separated as a full species, in which case the nominate subspecies is called western Hume's warbler – occurs on the eastern Tibetan Plateau. Both populations migrate over the Himalayas to winter in India and adjacent regions. The species has also been recorded in the Kutch region.

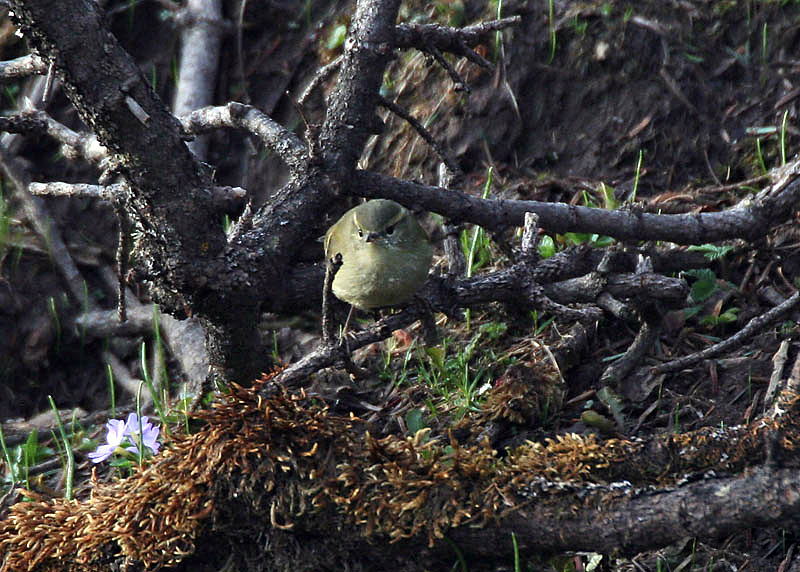
Foraging in the understory in Kullu district, Himachal Pradesh, India

Particularly on autumn migration, this tiny warbler is prone to vagrancy as far as western Europe, despite a 3,000 km distance from its breeding grounds. It is a rare vagrant in late autumn and winter in Great Britain. Non-breeding adults may stray around a lot in summer, when Mandell's leaf warblers are fairly common summer visitors to subtropical and temperate montane humid forests of Bhutan, around 2,000-3,500 m ASL and dominated by Bhutan fir (Abies densa) or by Himalayan hemlock (Tsuga dumosa) and rhododendrons, though the subspecies is not a regular breeder in that country.

This bird is not shy, although its arboreal lifestyle and cryptic colours make it difficult to observe. It is constantly in motion. Like most "Old World warblers", this small passerine is insectivorous. The nest is built on the ground.

A common species in most of its wide range, Hume's leaf-warbler is not considered threatened by the IUCN.

It was recently split from the yellow-browed warbler (Phylloscopus inornatus), based on differences in morphology, bioacoustics, and molecular characters. The western Hume's leaf warbler's range overlaps with that of the yellow-browed warbler in the western Sayan Mountains, but the species apparently do not hybridise. The divergence between the two species has been tentatively estimated at 2.5 million years ago (mya), and that between P. h. humei and P. h. mandelli at about 1 mya.
