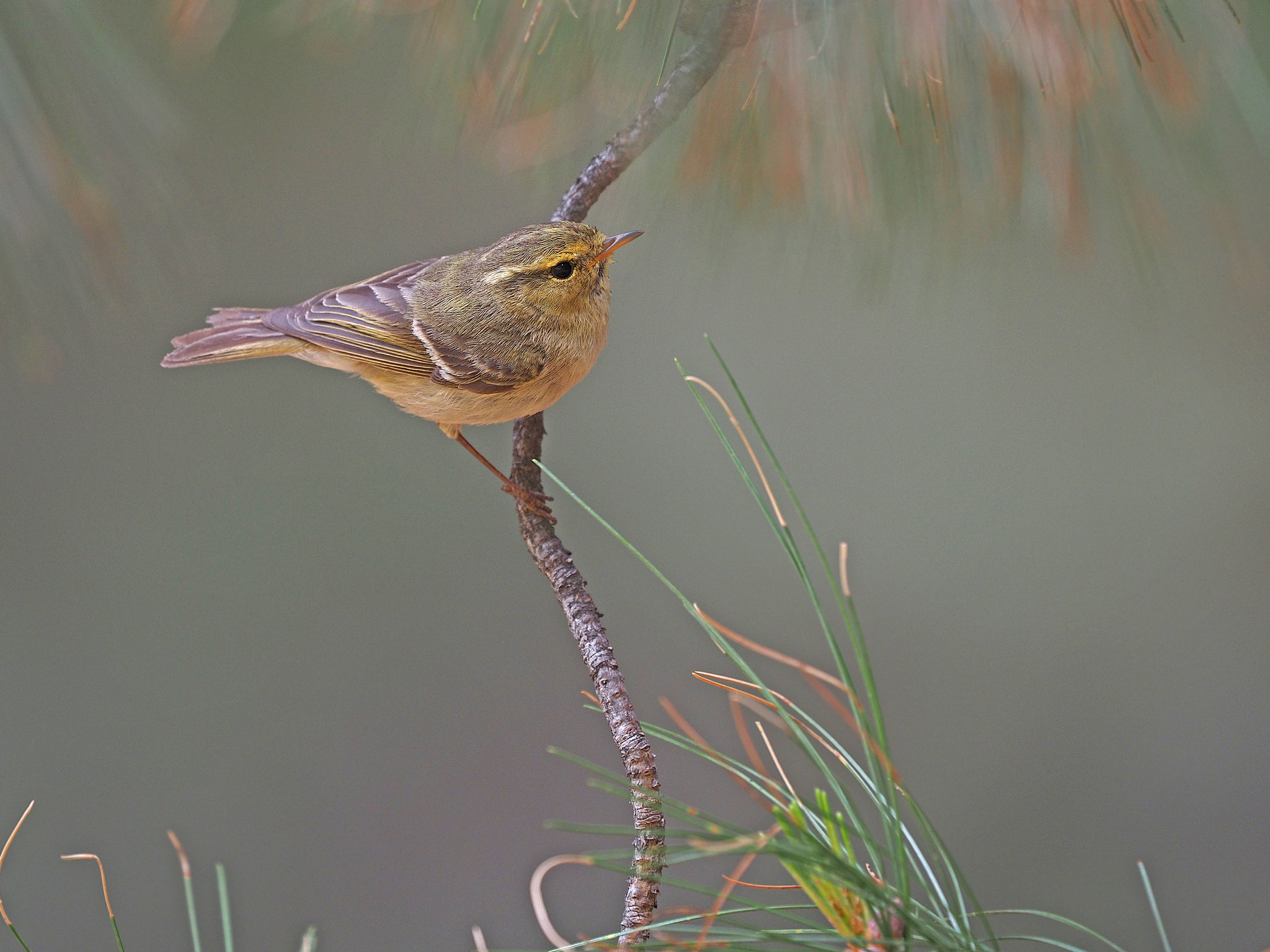

Conservation status
- Least Concern (IUCN 3.1)

Scientific classification
- Kingdom: Animalia
- Phylum: Chordata
- Class: Aves
- Order: Passeriformes
- Family: Phylloscopidae
- Genus: Phylloscopus
- Species: P. subviridis

Binomial name
- Phylloscopus subviridis (Brooks, 1872)

= Brooks's leaf warbler =

Species of bird

Brooks's leaf warbler (Phylloscopus subviridis) is a species of Old World warbler in the family Phylloscopidae.

== Distribution and habitat ==
It is found in Afghanistan, India, Kazakhstan, Pakistan, Russia, and Turkmenistan, but has been recorded only in northwestern India and Pakistan in present times. Its natural habitats are boreal forests and temperate forests.

== History ==
The Brooks's leaf warbler was described by ornithologist William Edwin Brooks, father of the Canadian bird illustrator Allan Brooks.
