= Drift migration =

Drift migration is the phenomenon in which migrating birds are blown off course by the winds while they are in flight. It is more likely to happen to birds heading south in autumn because the large numbers of inexperienced young birds are less able to compensate than the adults heading north in spring.

Drift is assisted by disorientating conditions such as mist or drizzle, and can result in large numbers of birds arriving together in an area in which they are not normally seen. In the UK this is called a fall, while in the U.S. it is known as a fallout, though in the latter case, it need not involve vagrant birds.

An example would be an east wind in September blowing Scandinavian migrants such as bluethroats, wrynecks, and the continental race of robin onto the east coast of England and Scotland, leading to temporary concentrations of these species at headlands like Spurn.

== See also ==
- Reverse migration (birds)
