= Vagrancy (biology) =

Phenomenon where an animal appears outside its normal range

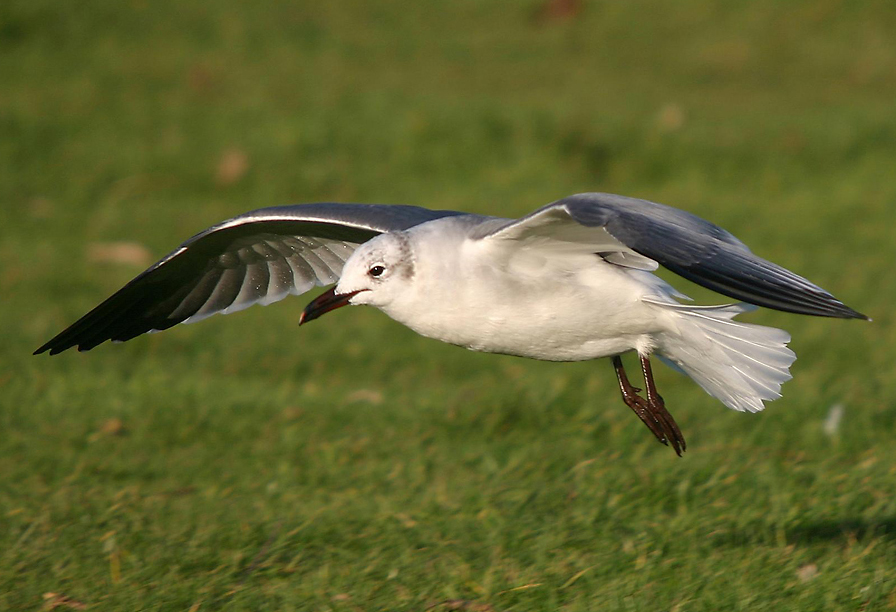
Laughing gull, a species of the Americas, photographed in Wales.

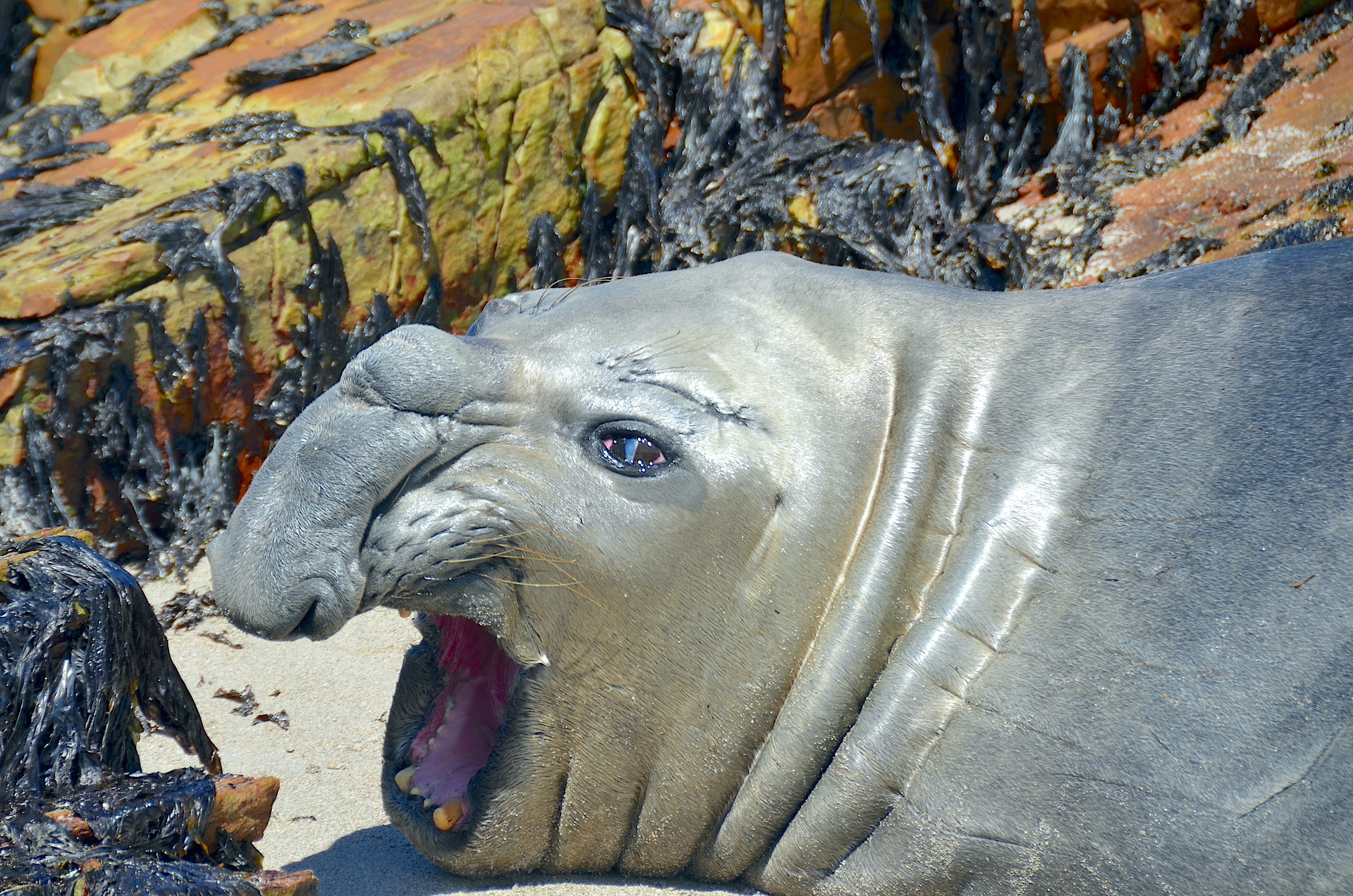
Southern elephant seal, a species of earless seals, photographed in South Africa.

Vagrancy is a phenomenon in biology whereby an individual animal (usually a bird) appears well outside its normal range; such an animal is a vagrant. The term accidental is sometimes also used. There are a number of poorly understood factors which might cause an animal to become a vagrant, including internal causes such as navigation errors (endogenous vagrancy) and external causes such as severe weather (exogenous vagrancy). Vagrancy events may lead to colonisation and eventually to speciation.

== Birds ==
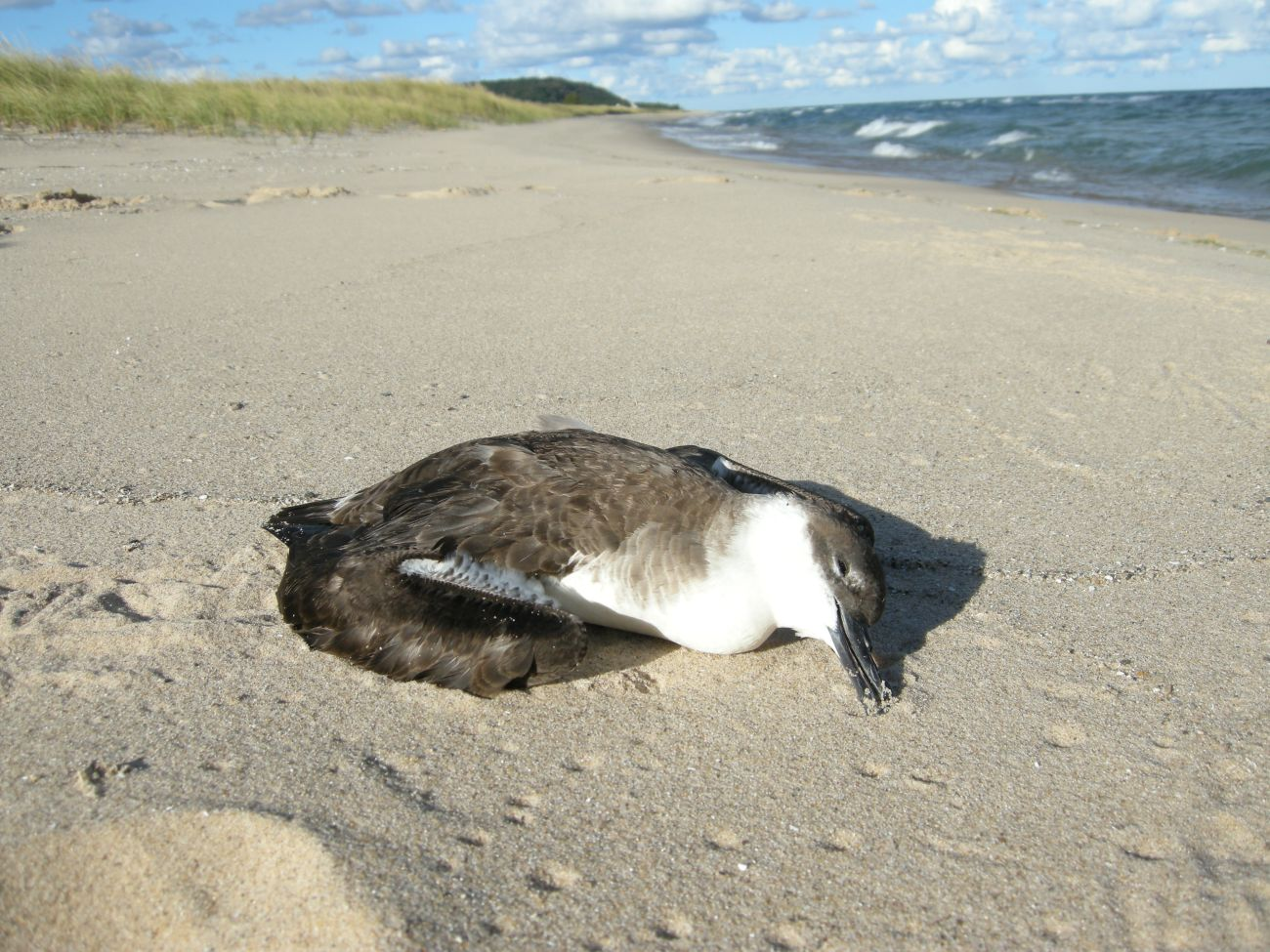
Vagrant birds in unfamiliar habitats may end up dying from stress or a lack of food, as happened to this great shearwater that was found at Sleeping Bear Dunes National Lakeshore on Lake Michigan

In the Northern Hemisphere, birds (often inexperienced younger adults) of many species are known to continue past their normal breeding range during their spring migration and end up in areas further north (such birds are termed spring overshoots).

In autumn, some young birds, instead of heading to their usual wintering grounds, take "incorrect" courses and migrate through areas which are not on their normal migration path. For example, Siberian passerines which normally winter in Southeast Asia are commonly found in Northwest Europe, e.g. Arctic warblers in Britain. This is reverse migration, where the birds migrate in the opposite direction to that expected (say, flying north-west instead of south-east). The causes of this are unknown, but genetic mutation or other anomaly relating to the bird's magnetic sensibilities is suspected.

Other birds are sent off course by storms and high winds, such as some North American birds blown across the Atlantic Ocean to Europe. Birds can also be blown out to sea, become physically exhausted, land on a ship and end up being carried to the ship's destination.

While many vagrant birds do not survive, if sufficient numbers wander to a new area they can establish new populations. Once a new population is established, a sustained lack of gene flow may result in speciation. Many isolated oceanic islands are home to species that are descended from landbirds blown out to sea, Hawaiian honeycreepers and Darwin's finches being prominent examples.

The appearance of vagrant birds can attract significant attention from birders, and some hobbyists will travel great distances to observe them. The identification and tracking of vagrant birds by amateur birders is a form of citizen science that can be of great value for scientific research.

== Insects ==
Vagrancy in insects is recorded from many groups—it is particularly well-studied in butterflies and moths, and dragonflies. Vagrancy appears to be highly correlated with migration in certain species of butterfly and dragonfly. In butterfly host-plant sampling, higher frequencies of vagrancy were documented in shrub- and forb-feeding larvae compared to grass-feeding larvae. Vagrant individuals in the Tramea genus of dragonflies migrate as well, and may be prone to vagrancy due to elongated hindwings equipped for long, gliding flights. Individuals from a North American dragonfly species, Anax junius, have been reported anomalously in Europe during autumn months when strong westerly winds can redirect migration routes.

== Mammals ==
In mammals, vagrancy has been recorded for bats, pinnipeds (seals), beluga whales, manatees, cougars, and more. Migrating bats may be blown off course during unfavorable winds or extreme weather events. Nomadic Antarctic and sub-Antarctic seal species have been observed in temperate islands in the South Atlantic Ocean. Leopard Seals which breed on Antarctic ice banks have been seen as far north as Gough Island (40°20′S 10°00′W) and Tristan da Cunha (37°05′S 12°17′W). Male beluga whales, which breed in the Arctic circle, may turn up as vagrant groups in sub-Arctic waters, with one sole vagrant reported further south off the shore of Baja California, Mexico. Manatee vagrants from small, localized Puerto Rican populations have been observed on several occasions in the U.S. Virgin Islands. Manatees are known to travel long distances to repeat locations, suggesting preference for particular foraging sites. Rarer examples come from individuals traveling from Florida to the northeastern United States. One manatee, named "Chessie," made repeated northward journeys for several summers, possibly indicating destination-directed vagrancy. More examples of transoceanic vagrancy have occurred in small-bodied mammals. At least one instance of mole, shrew, monkey, civet, lemur, and rat vagrants have been demonstrated relocating to new continents via vegetation mats or uprooted tree rafts. Relocation this way, while rare, is possible when individuals lower metabolic activity, allowing them to survive harsh maritime conditions with little food or water.

== Reptiles ==
Vagrancy has been recorded for sea turtles, snakes (e.g. Pelamis platura) and crocodilians, and probably also occurs in lizards. It therefore seems to be a fairly widespread phenomenon in reptiles. Saltwater crocodiles are especially prone to vagrancy, with individuals occasionally being recorded in odd places including Fiji, Iwo Jima, and even the Sea of Japan.

== Plants ==
The term vagrant is also used of plants (e.g. Gleason and Cronquist, 1991), to refer to a plant that is growing far away from its species' usual range (especially north of its range) with the connotation of being a temporary population. In the context of lichens, a vagrant form or species occurs unattached to a substrate ("loose"), not necessarily outside its range.

Another definition (de Lange & Molloy, 1995) defined vagrant species in New Zealand flora – although could also be applied for any given region. Their definition was, "taxa whose presence within the New Zealand botanical region is naturally transitory ... those which have failed to establish themselves significantly beyond their point of introduction through reproductive failure or for quite specific ecological reasons.". One example was the presence of Atriplex cinerea in New Zealand.
