= Reverse migration (immunology) =

Within molecular and cell biology, reverse migration is the phenomenon in which some neutrophils migrate away from the inflammation site, against the chemokine gradient, during inflammation resolution. The activation of in vivo inflammatory pathways (such as hypoxia-inducible factor, HIF), alters this behavior of reverse migration. The introduction of HIF and other related inflammatory pathways can alter the usual behavior and pattern of neutrophil migration, allowing these neutrophils to move away from the injury site rather than toward it. Several studies in the last few years have shown that reverse migration of neutrophils can play a dual role in the immune system response. On one hand, reverse migration can help in the resolution of inflammation by removing neutrophils once they have played their role at the site of injury. On the other hand, neutrophils re-entering the bloodstream can further contribute to the spread of a systemic infection. Therefore, it is essential to understand the regulation of reverse migration to treat a wide variety of inflammation-driven diseases including sepsis. However, the mechanisms that regulate the complex process of reverse migration remain poorly understood for the most part.

== Role of reverse migration in sepsis ==
Sepsis is a life-threatening organ dysfunction caused by failure for the host immune system to respond adequately to infection. Sepsis can result from the spread of any type of infection, but the majority of cases of septic shock are the result of hospital-acquired gram-negative bacilli or gram-positive cocci infections. Sepsis shock occurs more often in patients who are immunocompromised and in patients that have chronic or debilitating diseases.

During the progression of sepsis, polymorphonuclear neutrophils (PMNs) are the most abundantly recruited innate immune cells at the site of infection, playing a critical role in the healing process. PMNs exhibit reverse migration as sepsis progresses as they migrate away from the injury site back into the vasculature, the arrangement of blood vessels around the site, following initial PMN infiltration. The role of reverse migration in the immune response requires further investigation, but the current thinking is that reverse migration can play a role in both a protective response and also a tissue-damaging event. A better understanding of the role of reverse migration in sepsis can provide a critical branching point in the development of therapeutic approaches to sepsis.

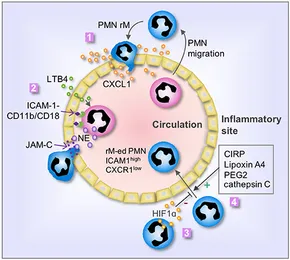
Mechanisms of PMN rM

Current knowledge on the mechanisms of PMN reverse migration (rM)

The mechanisms that regulate polymorphonuclear neutrophil (PMN) migration from inflammatory sites are still not entirely or well understood. Several factors that contribute to PMN forward migration, such as chemotaxis, chemotactic attractants and repellents, chemokine receptors, interactions with endothelial cells, and changes in PMN behavior, are however thought to play integral roles in controlling PMN reverse migration (rM).

== Polymorphonuclear neutrophil (PMN) response ==
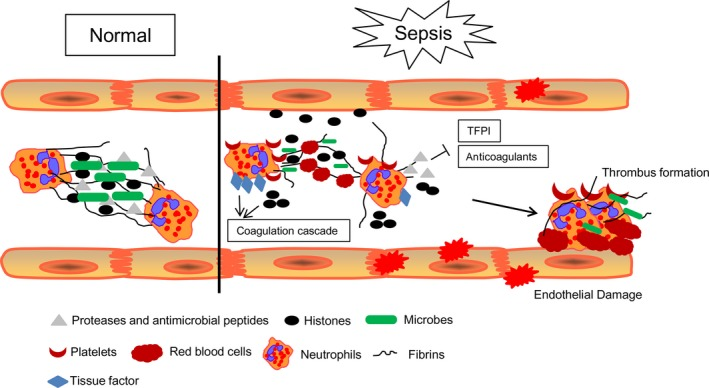
Neutrophil extracellular traps (NETs) in Sepsis

In a typical infection response, polymorphonuclear neutrophils (PMNs) exhibit antimicrobial activity to clear pathogens from a site of inflammation through degranulation, phagocytosis, and the release of cytokines. Another process recently found to play a critical role in coagulation and neutrophil immune response is the formation of neutrophil extracellular traps (NETs). NETs are networks composed of chromatin fibres and with granules associated with antimicrobial peptides and enzymes, which assist in the capture and removal of invading microbial pathogens. Once the antimicrobial functions of PMNs are carried out, it is essential to clear PMNs to restore homeostasis. Previously, PMN clearance was thought to occur through apoptosis or necrosis, followed by phagocytosis by macrophages. However, recent findings in imaging technology have revealed that PMNs can also migrate back into circulation, providing an alternative mechanism for removal of PMNs from the site of inflammation.

== Mechanisms of neutrophil motility ==
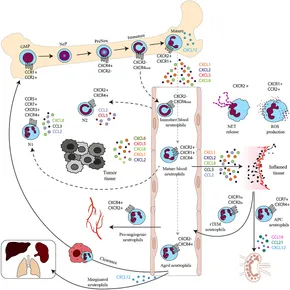
Chemokines and chemokine receptors in the neutrophil life cycle.

Neutrophils are highly motile immune cells that play a crucial role in the body’s defense against infection and injury. They exhibit two distinct types of movement: chemokinesis, in which they migrate randomly in response to environmental cues, and chemotaxis, which is a more directed, regulated movement toward a specific location in response to chemical signals. During an inflammation event or injury, a variety of chemical signals, including chemokines and cytokines, orchestrate the movement of neutrophils to and from the injury site. Once neutrophils exit the bloodstream through transendothelial migration, they encounter several chemoattractants that help direct them toward the injured tissue. Once they have arrived at the site of inflammation, neutrophils perform several immune functions to eliminate pathogens and clear any possible debris. However, the effective resolution of inflammation depends not only on the neutrophils' ability to reach the site of injury but also on their timely removal from the site after their immune functions are completed. This removal can occur through programmed cell death (apoptosis) or reverse migration, where neutrophils return to the bloodstream and circulation. Consequently, any impairment in neutrophils' ability to interpret and respond to chemoattractants and complex signaling cues can lead to immune dysfunction or contribute to chronic inflammatory diseases.

== Reverse migration of PMNs as a novel drug target ==
A major goal in immunology is to identify molecular targets involved in the body's response to wound-induced inflammation, which may include the process of reverse migration and the neutrophils involved. The introduction of necrosis or apoptosis-inducing drugs may cause an overall response of increased inflammation, even though they would aid in the clearance of neutrophils. Thus, there is heightened interest in targeting reverse migration of PMNs for the development of anti-inflammatory therapies. Several clinical trials are currently in place aiming to specifically target neutrophil migration signals. One current phase II trial involves the drug Reparixin, which has the potential to combat ischaemia–reperfusion injury and inflammation after on-pump coronary artery bypass graft surgery. Since this initial study in 2015, Reparixin has also been investigated as a treatment for patients with severe cases of COVID-19 related pneumonia. Innovative approaches to inflammation and infection such as the study of potential therapeutic compounds like Reparixin have the potential to provide unprecedented treatments for traditionally life-threatening infections.
