= Allan Brooks =

Canadian ornithologist and bird artist

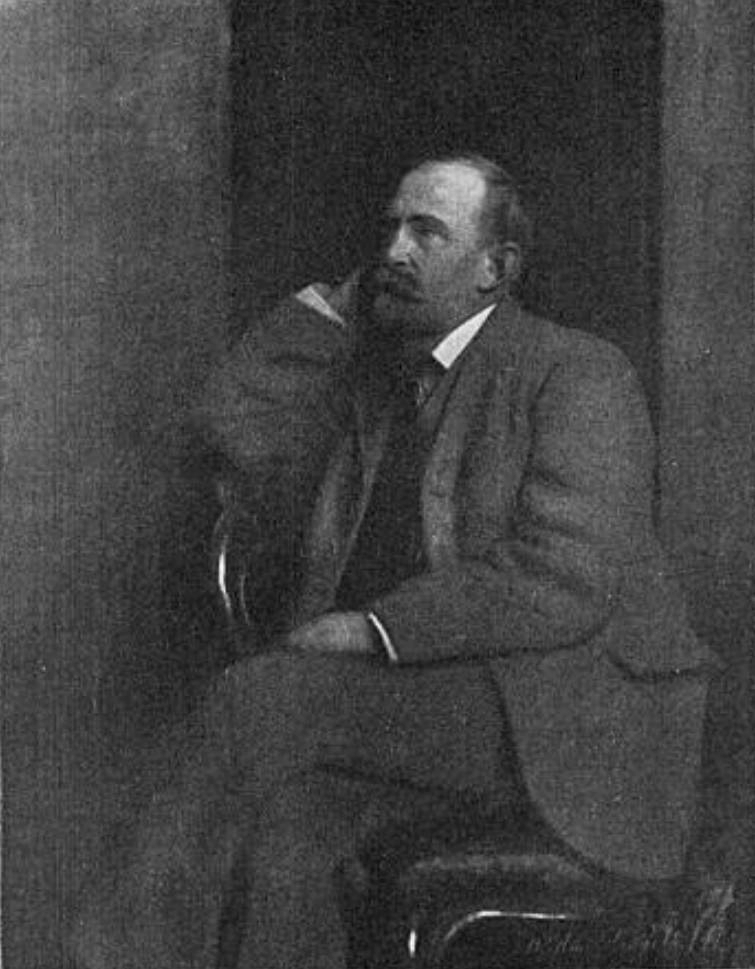
Photograph (1913)

Allan Cyril Brooks (February 15, 1869 Etawah – January 3, 1946) was an ornithologist and bird artist who lived in Canada. His father William Edwin Brooks had been a keen ornithologist in India but growing up in a farming household in Canada made his entry into the career of bird art much more difficult than for his contemporary Louis Agassiz Fuertes in the United States of America. His painting style was more impressionist with a greater emphasis on the habitat than on fine details of plumage. After Fuertes' death in a road accident, he was commissioned to complete the plates for Birds of Massachusetts.

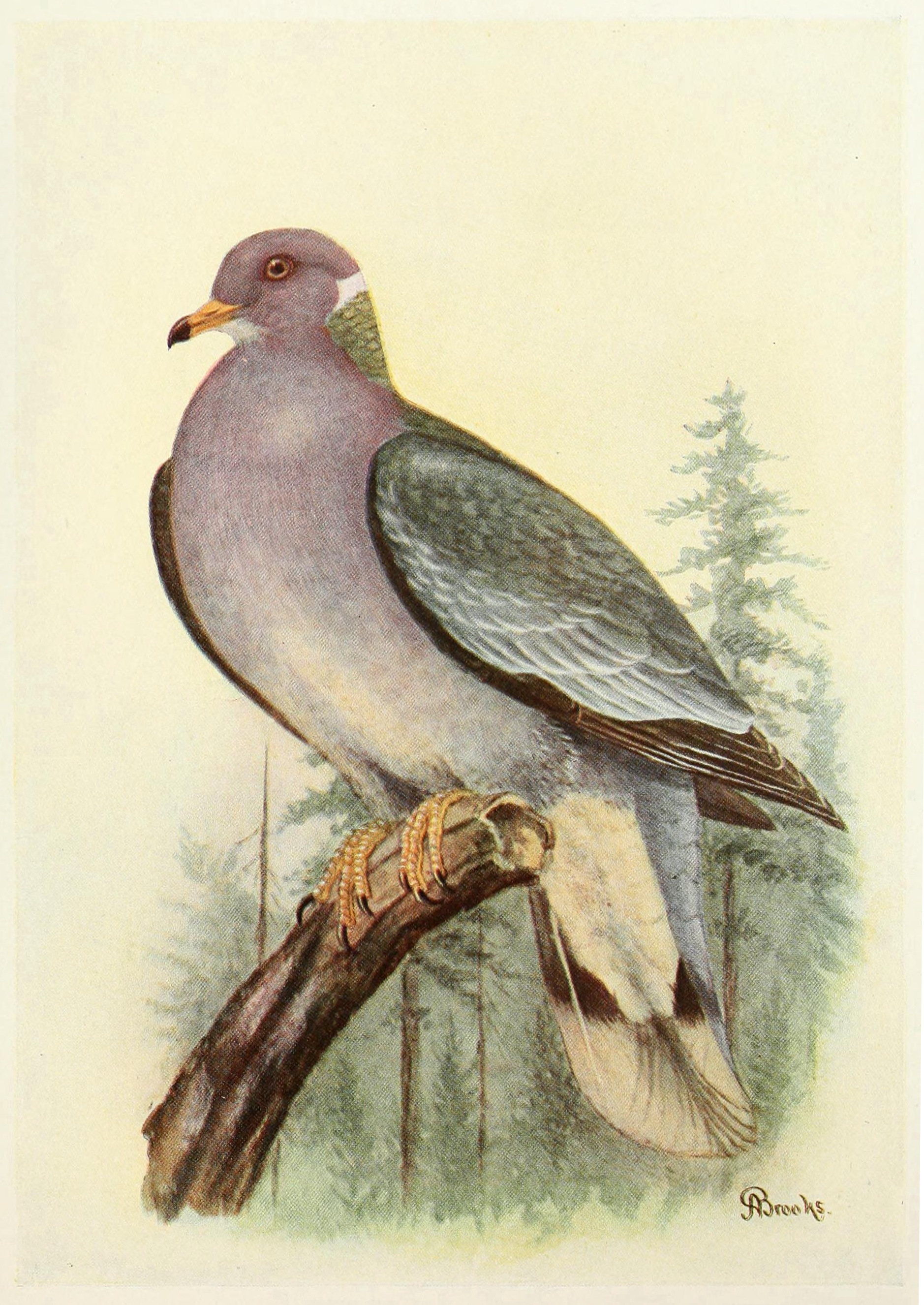
Illustration of a band-tailed pigeon

== Life and career ==
Allan was born in Etawah in India, where his father, W. E. Brooks, worked in the railways while also studying the birds of India, particularly the leaf-warblers. His father named him after his close friend and ornithological associate in India, Allan Octavian Hume. Allan went to school in England (1873–1881) and studied the bird life of the Northumberland moors. Thanks to his father's connections, he interacted with Henry Seebohm and learnt egg-collection and butterfly collection from the taxidermist John Hancock. He later studied the birds of Ontario where his father William Edwin Brooks had settled to a farming life.

In Canada, he met Thomas McIlwraith in 1885 and learnt specimen collecting and skinning techniques from him. In 1887, the family moved to Chilliwack, British Columbia. Robert Ridgway, the American ornithologist helped him identify birds early in Brooks' life and had shown appreciation for his art work. Brooks began his career as a specimen collector and game hunter, providing specimens to the Victoria Memorial Museum and a few private collectors. Towards the end of the 1890s Brooks contributed pictures for George Oliver Shields' Recreation magazine. Unlike wildlife artists in the United States of America during the same period, he did not find easy ways to support his interest in art. William Brewster wrote to him in 1895 that he could help him make the art work paying if Brooks could work harder. He then made some watercolours for Brewster, earning about three or four dollars for each illustration.

Brooks later began to contribute illustrations to periodicals such as Recreation and St. Nicholas Magazine. His first big commission was for a book by William Leon Dawson. Dawson had sought the work of Louis Agassiz Fuertes but found him too expensive. He subsequently found more work and became a distinguished bird artist, going on to illustrate Percy A. Taverner's Birds of Western Canada (1926) and Birds of Canada (1934). Brooks' style was more impressionistic, giving more emphasis to the background and artistry. Others artists like Fuertes tended to give more care to the detail in the foreground subject.

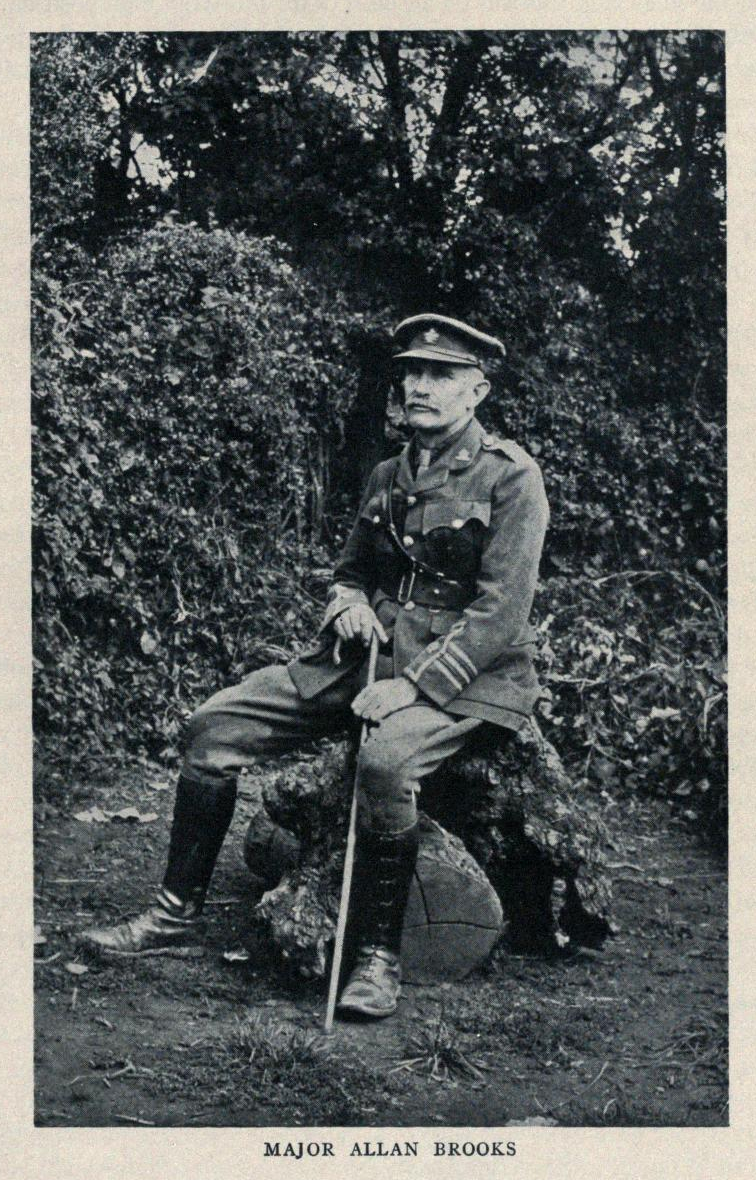
Major Brooks in 1917

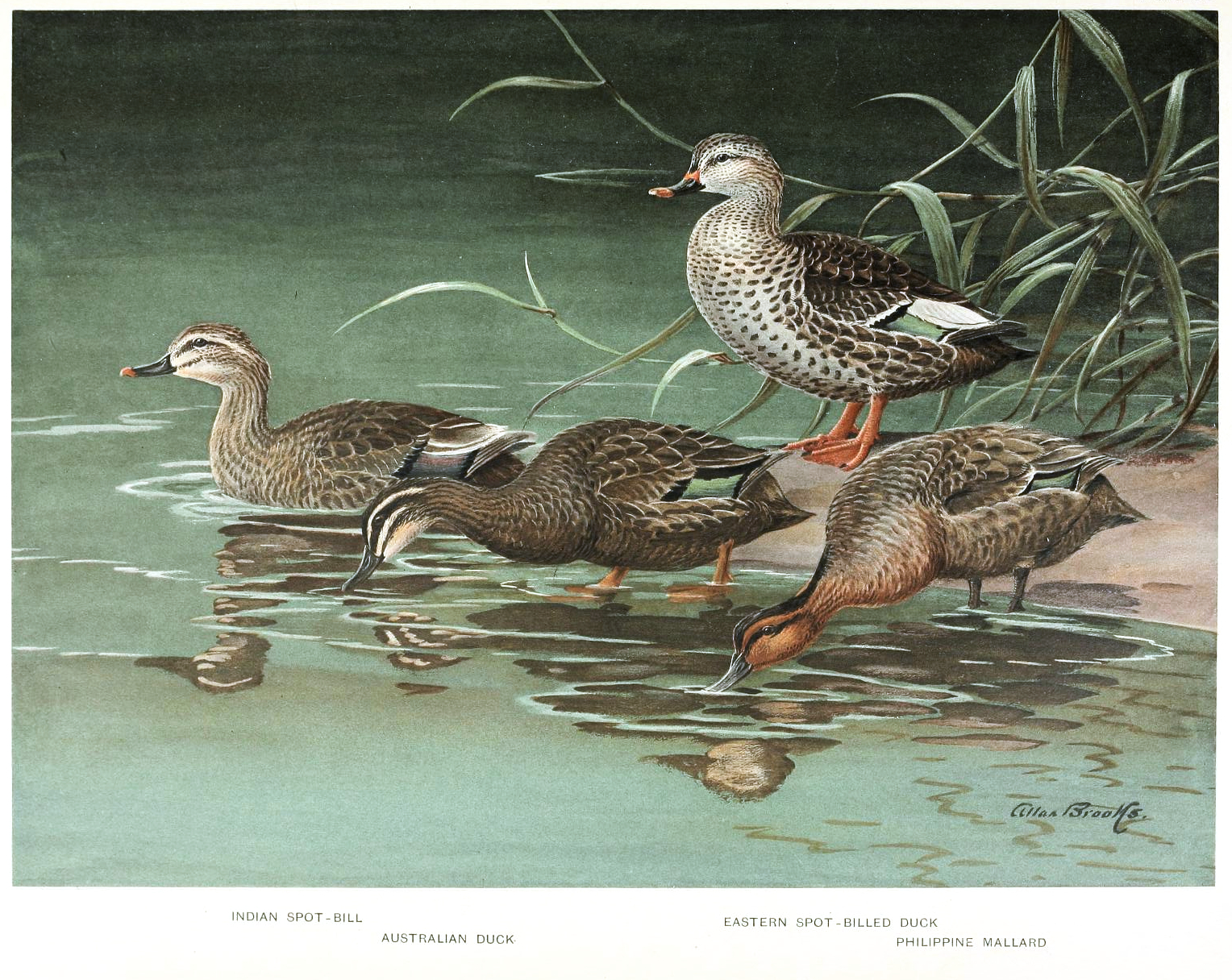
Painting from A natural history of the ducks. Volume II (1923)

He was also recruited during World War I for his skills as a sharp-shooter and served with the 7th Canadian Infantry Battalion and later was a chief instructor training snipers. He was awarded with a Distinguished Service Order.

For conspicuous gallantry in the operations of 2nd and 3rd September in front of Arras. As brigade observing officer he showed great daring and initiative, pushing forward at all times with the most advanced troops under the heaviest fire. Taking a wire with him, he kept brigade headquarters well informed of the situation, and enabled the commander to make decisions that saved many lives. When the enemy were retiring he pushed forward over 500 yards in front of the infantry and telephoned back information from a long distance in front of our advance. During the two days he personally killed twenty of the enemy by sniping shots.

During the Second World War, he also contributed his paintings to the Red Cross. While posted in Flanders, he reported on the birds of a war-zone. He noted that rats and pigs tended to become numerous. He also recorded the predation of bird's eggs by slugs, a phenomenon that was studied in greater detail only in 2017. In 1921, part of his home was burned down. In this fire, he lost many of his old notes and books including a series on Indian birds that he had since the age of 3. In 1926 he married Marjorie and in 1927 he moved to Brownsville, Texas from where he worked on illustrations for volume 3 of "Birds of Massachusetts", a work that had been interrupted by the death of Louis Fuertes.
