= Reverse migration (birds) =

Phenomenon in bird migration

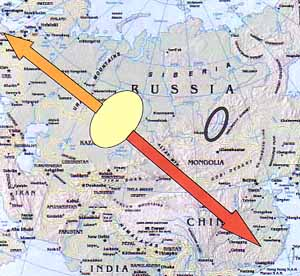
Reverse migration

Reverse migration, also called reverse misorientation, is a phenomenon whereby a bird migrates in the opposite direction to that typical of its species during the spring or autumn. For example, if a bird breeding in central Asia reverses its normal southeasterly migration, as shown by the orange arrow, it will end up in Western Europe instead of South East Asia. This mechanism may lead to birds such as Pallas's leaf warblers turning up thousands of kilometres from where they should be. Keith Vinicombe suggested that birds from east of Lake Baikal in Siberia (circled) could not occur in western Europe because their migration routes were too north–south.

Many birds that detour from their regular migration patterns find themselves in adverse wintering circumstances, so a considerable number may not survive. However, there is compelling evidence that a tiny percentage adapt and survive in their unusual wintering locations. In subsequent winters, they may re-orient themselves, eventually making their way back to more favorable environments. Some individuals may even return to the same region in consecutive years, demonstrating migratory birds' adaptability and tenacity.

== Reverse migration as genetic or learned behaviour ==
Some large birds, such as swans, learn migration routes from their parents. However, in most small species, such as passerines, the route is genetically programmed, and young birds navigate innately to their wintering area.

As migration is most often genetically programmed before birth, there can be rare variations and defects that change the migration programming. These variations will account for some but not all reverse migration cases. Birds that have changed their migration path, if they survive, may breed with others who also follow this different migration route. Their offspring and subsequent generations may now follow the new, genetically programmed migration route.

Genetic variations may be triggered by a range of factors, including mutations in the genes responsible for the sensing of environmental cues such as photoperiod (day length) or geomagnetic fields, which birds use for navigation. Other factors, such as changes in habitat availability, food sources, or climate conditions, may also contribute to changes in migration patterns. These genetic and environmental influences can lead to the rare but intriguing phenomenon.

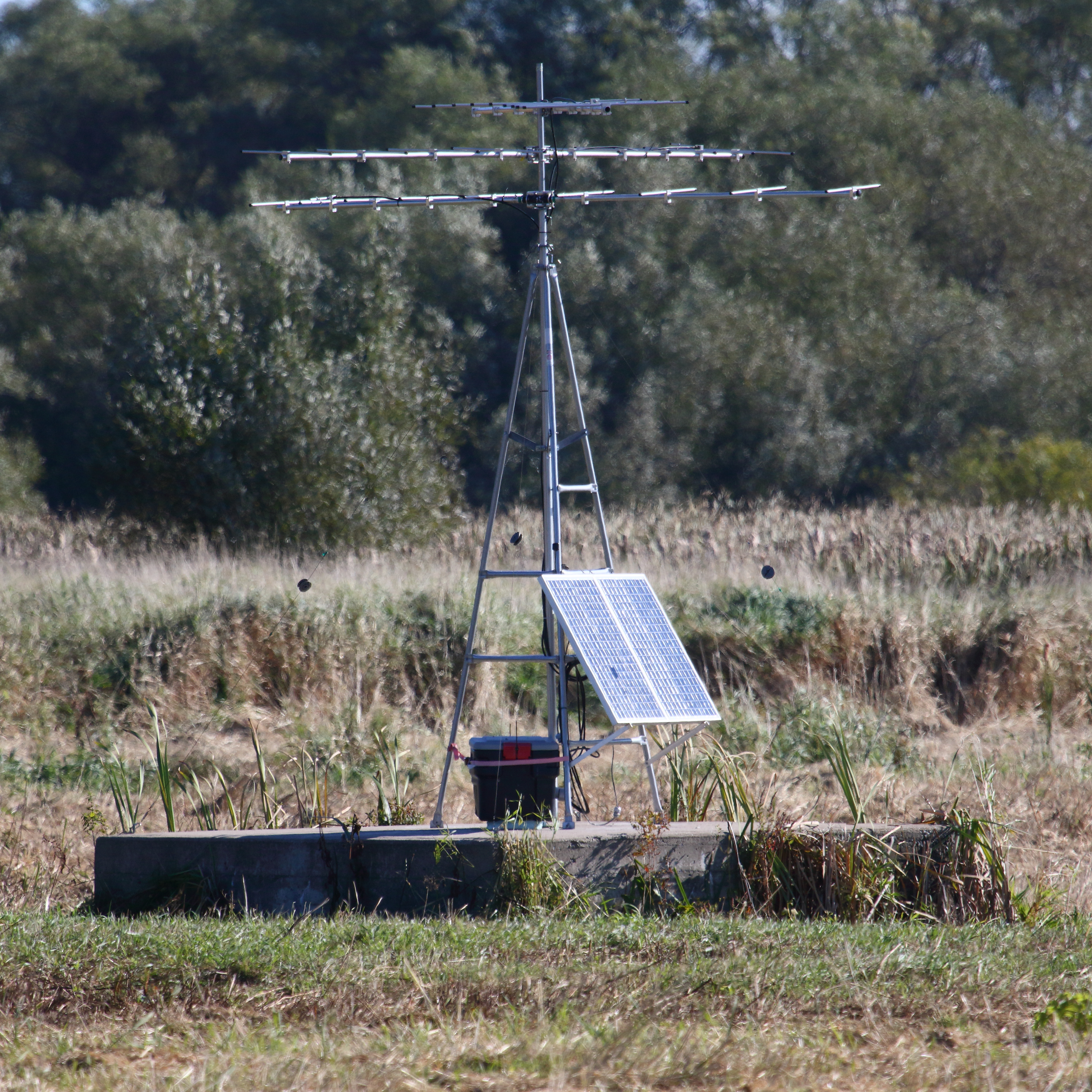
A station like this can be used to track transmitters on birds.

== Methods of tracking migration ==
=== Tracking radar ===
A single bird can be tracked using a manually operated tracking radar to understand the target's position and trajectory and to predict where it will arrive. As the bird flaps its wings, the echo can be recorded and compared to patterns to understand flight patterns and changes in flight patterns. Tracking radar was primarily used to monitor specific individuals during nocturnal migration. Many bird species, particularly songbirds, engage in nocturnal migratory flights, which have historically been difficult to trace. Manual tracking radar allows monitoring and recording of the flight patterns of these birds at night, when they are most active.

This technology has transformed the study of bird migration, providing scientists with a better knowledge of the routes, rest stops, and habits of many bird species on their lengthy treks. It has also enabled the detection of certain movement pathways and patterns that would have gone undiscovered otherwise. Manual monitoring radar data not only enhances our understanding of bird behavior, but it also plays an important role in avian conservation efforts and the protection of critical stopover sites along migration routes.

=== Radio telemetry ===
A miniature transmitter is attached to the subject animal and emits a very high frequency signal (30–300 MHz) that can be picked up by one or more receivers. For studying the movement of birds around Falsterbo bird observatory, a migration hotspot south-west of Sweden, three receivers were used to triangulate and track the birds.

The combination of small transmitters and triangulation via many receivers has transformed the area of avian studies, allowing scientists to unearth minute data about bird behavior, navigation, and habitat utilization. This knowledge, in turn, helps to conserve and safeguard critical bird stopping locations and migratory corridors.

=== Ringing ===
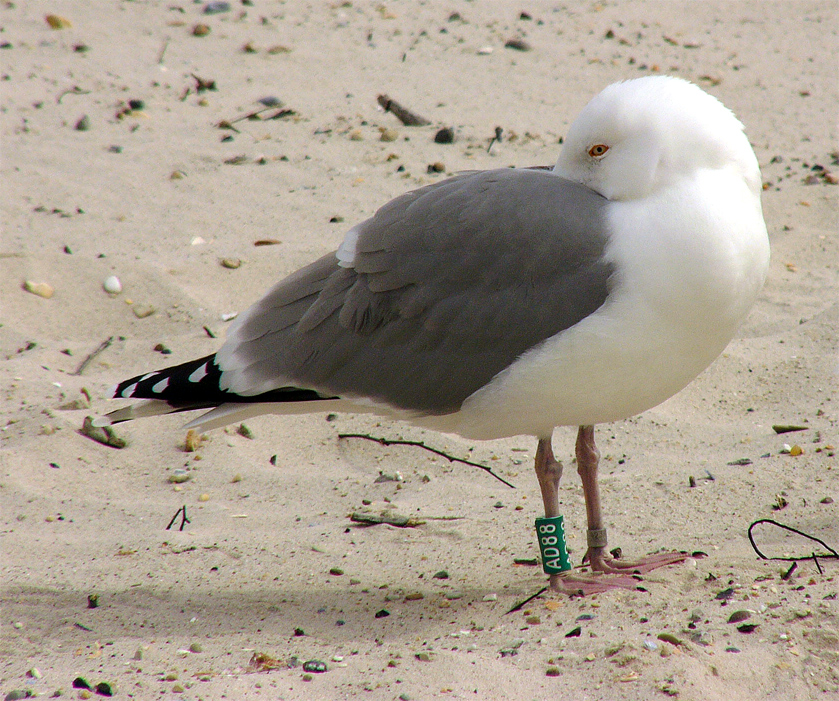
A band around the leg of the bird is used during ringing for identification purposes.

Bird ringers attach a permanent lightweight metal band with an identification number to the bird's foot in a way that does not impair movement. This identification number is reported by people who find or catch the bird, providing movement and history information that can indicate how old the bird is and where it has been. Birds are usually caught in mist nets to be measured and banded.

Additionally, bird banding provides critical information about the migration patterns of birds. When a banded bird is encountered in a location far from where it was initially banded, it indicates long-distance movements and migration routes. This data is essential for conservation efforts, as it helps identify stopover locations and key habitats that are crucial for the survival of migratory birds.

== Patterns in reverse migration ==
=== Opposite direction or random directions? ===
Reverse migration is widespread around the world and occurs for many species that migrate both by night and day. This irregular migration direction is most often approximately opposite to what is typical, rather than in a random direction. It occurs not only in species migrating to tropical areas in winter, but also in temperate-zone migrants, short irruptive food migrants, and in both short-distance and long-distance migrants.

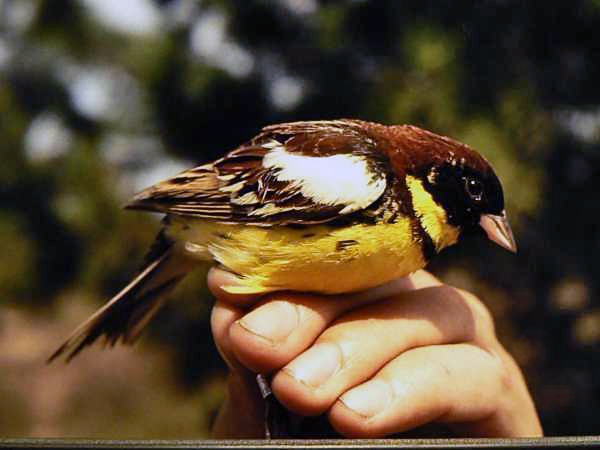
A yellow-breasted bunting, considered less likely to be a pseudo-vagrancy migrant

However, an article in British Birds by James Gilroy and Alexander Lees notes that while misorientation primarily occurs in the approximately opposite direction, it can also occur in random directions. These random directions could be partly the result of genetic variations or abnormalities. Birds that adopt and continue to migrate in this atypical direction have been called pseudo-vagrancy migrators. Some species are more prone to pseudo-vagrancy migration: yellow-breasted bunting, for example, is considered to be less prone to pseudo-vagrancy than, say, yellow-browed warbler.

=== Solitary reverse migration during the night ===
A study carried out in Falsterbo, Sweden, concluded that solitary birds migrating during the night were more likely to reverse migrate west (when east is the regular migratory path), rather than to the north in birds that normally migrate south. By only examining species that migrate solitarily during the night, they eliminated the possibly of group migration, where birds could be influenced by the behaviour of others.

=== Reverse migration due to inadequate fat stores ===
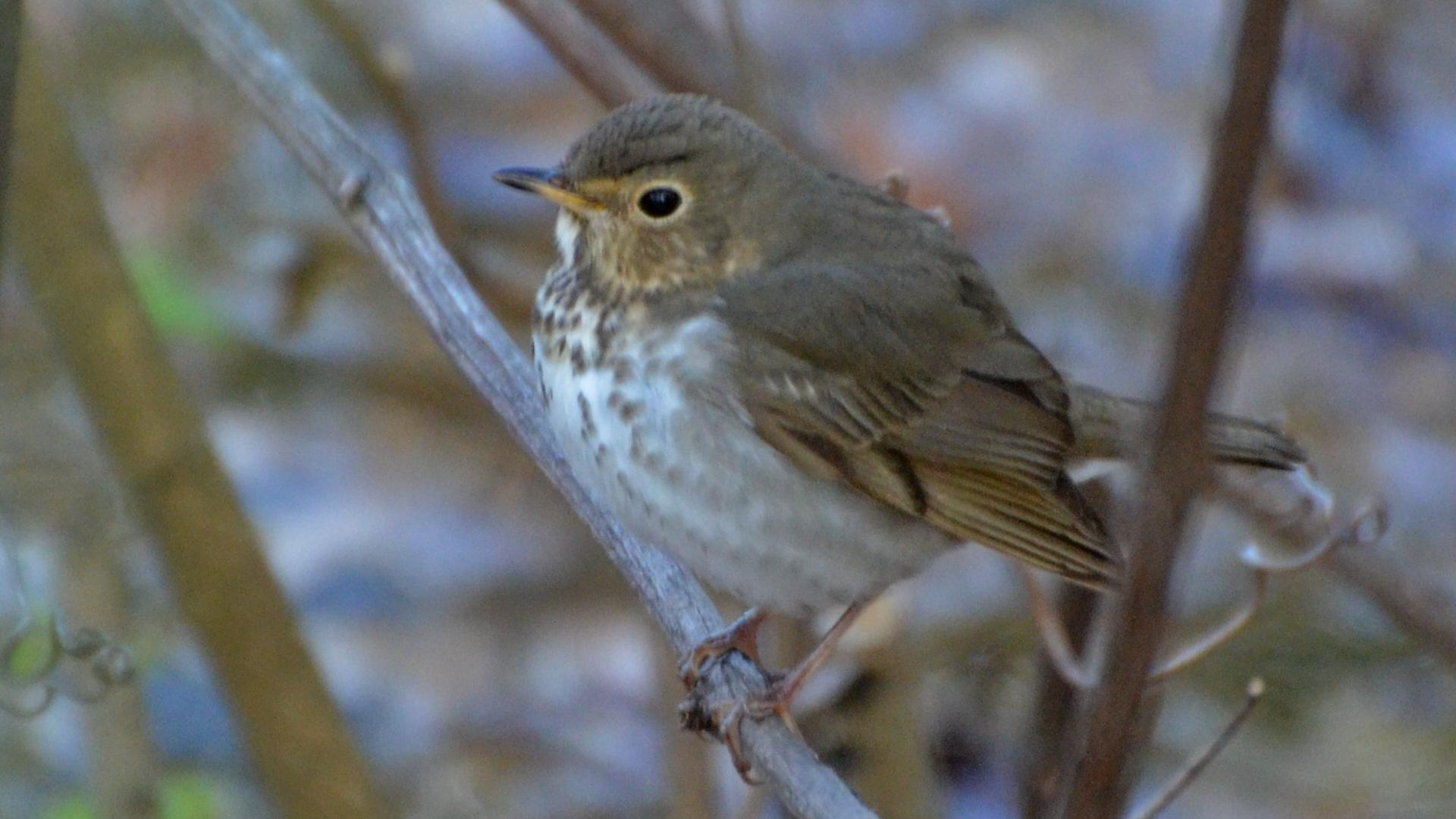
Swainson's thrush

Reverse migration is more likely to occur in individuals with relatively low fat stores. Thrushes migrating southwards were radio-tracked to examine when and why some individuals, during a stopover along the northern coast of Mexico, would not continue south but fly inland northerly. Birds that changed their normal migration were almost all found to be lean and low on fat stores. This may indicate that the normal stopover location had inadequate resources for the birds to build up fat reserves, so leaner birds may have moved inland and northwards in search of more food.

A study of red knots noted that reverse migration of 200 km has been frequently documented over the last 10 years. This study found no significant difference in body mass, fat stores or sex for these reverse migrating birds, but found that they had significantly lower hematocrit (the percentage of red blood cells). It has been observed that birds increase their hematocrit before consuming large amounts of food for fat stores, which could explain why these birds chose to travel 200 km in reverse to access high-quality softshell prey to supply fat and increase their hematocrit before long migrations.

=== Reverse migration to avoid flying over large expanses of water ===
Reverse migration is occasionally observed in Door County, Wisconsin. When broad-winged hawks traveling north reach the tip of the Door Peninsula and the islands beyond, the long stretches of water sometimes unnerve them. Instead of crossing over to the Garden Peninsula, they turn around and fly back down the peninsula.

== See also ==
- Drift migration
