= William Edwin Brooks =

Irish civil engineer and ornithologist

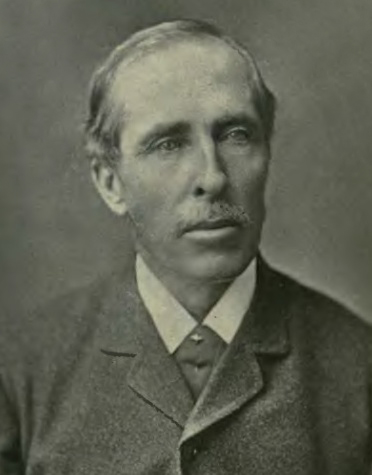
- Brooks in 1890

William Edwin Brooks (30 July 1828 near Dublin, Ireland – 18 January 1899 in Mount Forest, Ontario) was a civil engineer in India and an ornithologist. He later settled in Canada where his son Allan Cyril Brooks also became an ornithologist and bird artist of repute. Brooks was a pioneer of identifying species by their calls and he described several new species, particularly warblers in collaboration with Allan Octavian Hume. Brooks's leaf warbler is named after him.

== Life and work ==
Brooks was born in Ireland although his parents were from Northumberland. His father was a noted engineer William Alexander Brooks (25 March 1802 – 26 January 1877) who had worked on the Panama Canal with Ferdinand de Lesseps during which project he died at Paya near the Isthmus of Darien. His mother was Mary Eliza née Beale. Brooks was interested in birds from a young age and was a friend of Albany and John Hancock. A bird specimen in the Hancock museum was collected by Brooks in 1854. William Edwin Brooks went to India in 1856 as a civil engineer with the railways and stayed on until 1881 and was posted in Etawah from 1868 to 1880. His wife Mary Jane Renwick (married at Calcutta, 1859) from Newcastle upon Tyne was frail and suffered from poor health in India. It was hoped that she would recover her health with a move to Canada but she died shortly after the family (including three sons and two daughters) reached Quebec. The family initially settled in Ontario, Canada. Brooks was an honorary member of the British Ornithological Union. He corresponded with Alfred Russel Wallace, Thomas C. Jerdon and Robert Christopher Tytler. His vast collection of bird specimens is at the British Museum and during his career in India, he corresponded actively with other ornithologists in the region, notably Allan Octavian Hume. He also corresponded with ornithologists in Britain, including Henry Eeles Dresser, and sent many specimens to Dresser to distribute and trade with other ornithologists on his behalf. Brooks had always hoped that one of his children would take to natural history. His third son Allan Brooks, named after Hume, was sent to study in England and during his stay in Northumberland he trained under his father's close friend, John Hancock. Allan became an ornithologist and artist of repute in Canada. In 1887, Brooks moved his family from Milton, Ontario, to a new farm at Chilliwack, British Columbia. In 1891, he sold the Chilliwack property to return to Ontario where he bought a farm in Mount Forest.

Brooks was admired by later workers for his careful observations and notes on the vocalizations of warblers. He was among the first to suggest that each species of warbler had a distinctive call. Phylloscopus subviridis, first described by Brooks (in the genus Reguloides) is referred to as Brooks' leaf warbler. Brooks was a devout Christian and an anti-evolutionist unlike his son Allan.

== Publications ==
- 1871 Notes on the ornithology of Cashmir. Proc. Asiatic Soc. Bengal 1871, 78-86, 209–210.
- 1871 Description of a new species of (Abrornis). Proc. Asiatic Soc. Bengal 1871, 248–249.
- 1872 The swans of India. Proc. Asiatic Soc. Bengal 187(2):63–64.
- 1872 On a new Indian (Sylvia). Proc. Asiatic Soc. Bengal 1872, 66.
- 1872 On a new species of (Reguloides). Proc. Asiatic Soc. Bengal 1872, 148–150.
- 1872 On the Imperial Eagles of India. Proc. Zool. Soc. London 1872, 502–504.
- 1872 On a new species of (Phylloscopus). Ibis, 3 2, 22–23.
- 1872 On the breeding of (Reguloides superciliosus, Reguloides proregulus, Reguloides occipitalis) and (Phylloscopus tytleri). Ibis, 3 2, 24–31.
- 1873 Notes on the ornithology of Cashmir. Jour. Asiatic Soc. Bengal 41(2), 73–86.
- 1873 On two undescribed Cashmir birds. Jour. Asiatic Soc. Bengal 41, 327–329.
- 1873 On an undescribed species of (Lophophanes). Jour. Asiatic Soc. Bengal 42(2):57.
- 1873 Notes upon some of the Indian and European Eagles. No. II. Stray Feathers. 1(5):325–331.
- 1873 Notes on some of the Indian Pipits. Stray Feathers. 1(5):358–360.
- 1873 Notes on the Skylarks of India. Stray Feathers. 1(6):484–487.
- 1873 Notes upon some of the Indian and European Eagles. Stray Feathers. 1(2,3&4):290–294.
- 1873 Notes upon some of the Indian and European Eagles, No. III. Stray Feathers. 1(6):463–464.
- 1873 Notes on (Aquila naevioides, A. fulvescens) and (A. vindhiana). Proc. Asiatic Soc. Bengal Nov, 173–174.
- 1873 Notes on the Certhiinae of India. Jour. Asiatic Soc. Bengal 42(2):255–257.
- 1874 Some ornithological notes and corrections. Jour. Asiatic Soc. Bengal 42(2):239–253.
- 1874 Notes on the (Certhiinae) of India. Jour. Asiatic Soc. Bengal 42(2):255–257.
- 1874 To the Editor. Stray Feathers. 2(6):533.
- 1875 Notes upon a collection of birds made between Mussoori and Gangaotri in May 1874. Stray Feathers. 3(1,2&3):224–257.
- 1875 On (Curruca affinis) and (Curruca garrula). Stray Feathers. 3(4):272–273.
- 1875 Additional notes on birds collected between Mussoori and Gangaotri in May 1874. Stray Feathers. 3(4), 275–278.
- 1875 Notes on a new (Dumeticola), and on (Tribura luteoventris), Hodgson, and (Dumeticola affinis), Hodgson. Stray Feathers. 3(4), 284–287.
- 1875 On (Drymoipus inornatus), Sykes, and (Drymoipus longicaudatus), Tickell. Stray Feathers. 3(4), 295–296.
- 1875 Notes on "The Spotted Eagle," (Aquila naevia). Stray Feathers. 3(4), 304–313.
- 1875 On an apparently unnamed species of (Phoenicopterus). Proc. Asiatic Soc. Bengal January, 17–18.
- 1876 Ornithological notes and corrections. Stray Feathers. 4(4,5&6), 268–278.
- 1876 Letters to the Editor. Stray Feathers. 4(1,2&3), 229–230.
- 1877 Observations on (Falco hendersoni), Hume. Stray Feathers. 5(1), 48–50.
- 1877 Ornithological notes. Stray Feathers. 5(5&6), 469–472.
- 1877 A few observations on some species of (Anthus) and (Budytes). Ibis, 4 1(2), 206–209.
- 1878 On an overlooked species of (Reguloides). Stray Feathers. 7(1–2), 128–136.
- 1878 Observations on (Motacilla alba), Linn., and other Wagtails. Stray Feathers. 7(1–2), 136–142.
- 1878 Further notes on (Reguloides superciliosus) and (Reguloides humei). Stray Feathers. 7(3,4&5), 236–238.
- 1878 Letters to the Editor. Stray Feathers. 7(3,4&5), 468.
- 1879 Further observations on (Reguloides superciliosus) and (Reguloides humii), also on (Reguloides subviridis) and (Calliope yeatmani), Tristram. Stray Feathers. 7(6), 475–478.
- 1879 A few notes on (Phylloscopus plumbeitarsus), Swinhoe, and (Phylloscopus viridanus), Blyth. Stray Feathers. 7(6), 508–510.
- 1879 Note on (Horornis fulviventer), Hodgson. Stray Feathers. 8(2–5), 379–380.
- 1879 Further observations on (Phylloscopus viridanus) & (plumbeitarsus), also on (Reguloides humii). Stray Feathers. 8(2–5), 385.
- 1879 Description of another new (Reguloides). Stray Feathers. 8(2–5), 389–393.
- 1879 Ornithological observations in Sikhim, the Punjab, and Sind. Stray Feathers. 8(6), 464–489.
- 1880 A few remarks on (Schoenicola platyura). Stray Feathers. 9(1,2&3), 209–212.
- with Oates, Eugene W 1880): On a new species of (Tribura) (Dumeticola). Stray Feathers. 9(1,2&3), 220–224.
- 1880 Additional note on (Alseonax cinereo-alba) or (latirostris) and (Alseonax terricolor). Stray Feathers. 9(1,2&3), 225–226.
- 1880 Note on (Tribura mandellii). Stray Feathers. 9(4), 240–241.
- 1880 On an undescribed species of (Phylloscopus). Stray Feathers. 9(4), 272–273.
- 1881 (Dumeticola brunneipectus), Blyth. Stray Feathers. 9(5&6), 445.
- 1881 Letters to the Editor. Stray Feathers. 10(1,2&3), 169–171.
- 1892 A few remarks on Mr. Oates's "Birds of British India". Ibis, 6 4(13), 59–62.
- 1894 A few observations on some species of Phylloscopus. Ibis 6(22), 261–268.

== Sources ==
- Brooks, Marjorie (1938). "Allan Brooks: A Biography". The Condor. 40 (1): 12–17. doi:10.2307/1363833. JSTOR 1363833.
- Laing, Hamilton M. (1947). "Allan Brooks 1896–1946". The Auk. 64 (3): 430–444. doi:10.2307/4080389. JSTOR 4080389.
