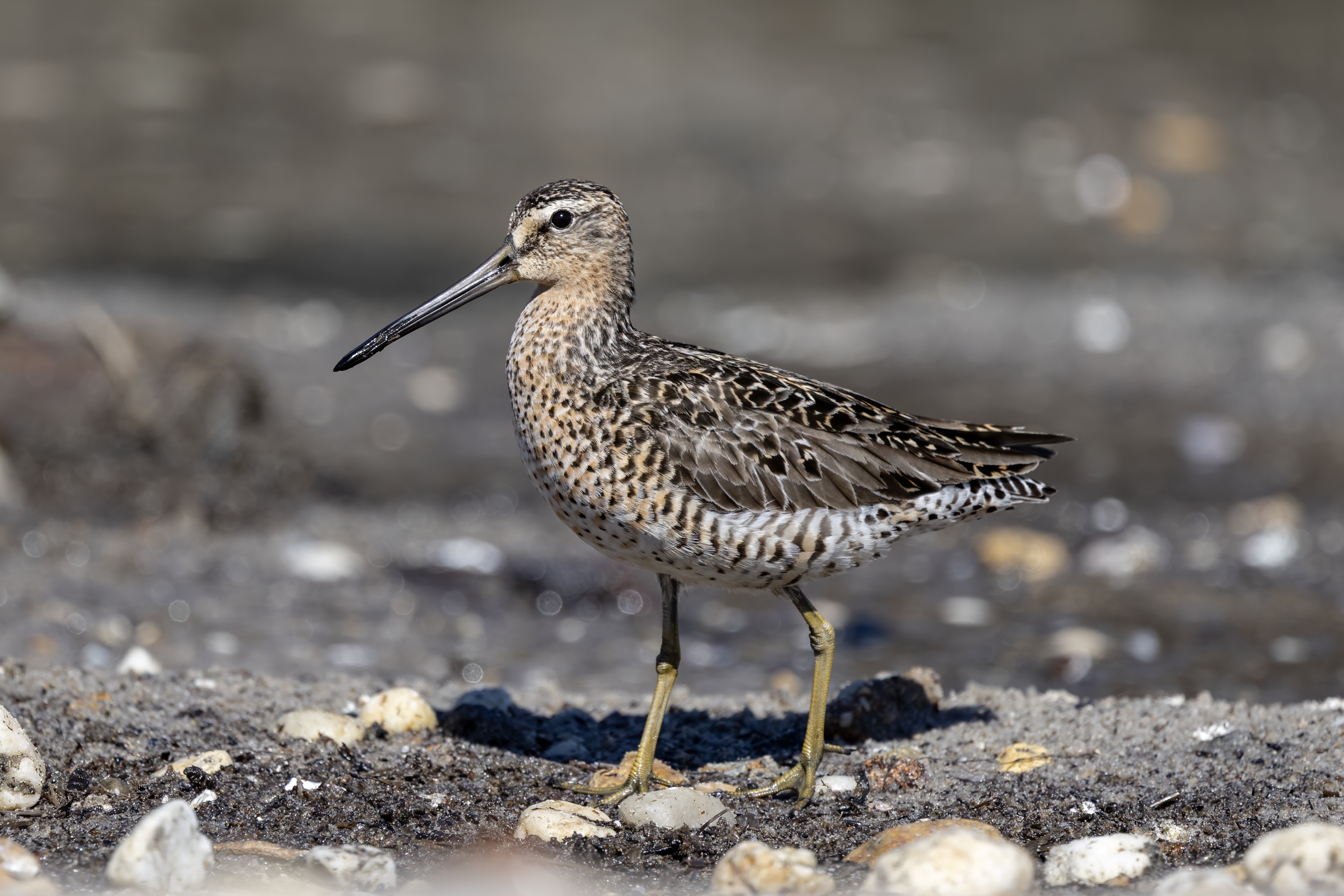
- A short-billed dowtcher (Limnodromus griseus griseus) in breeding plumage
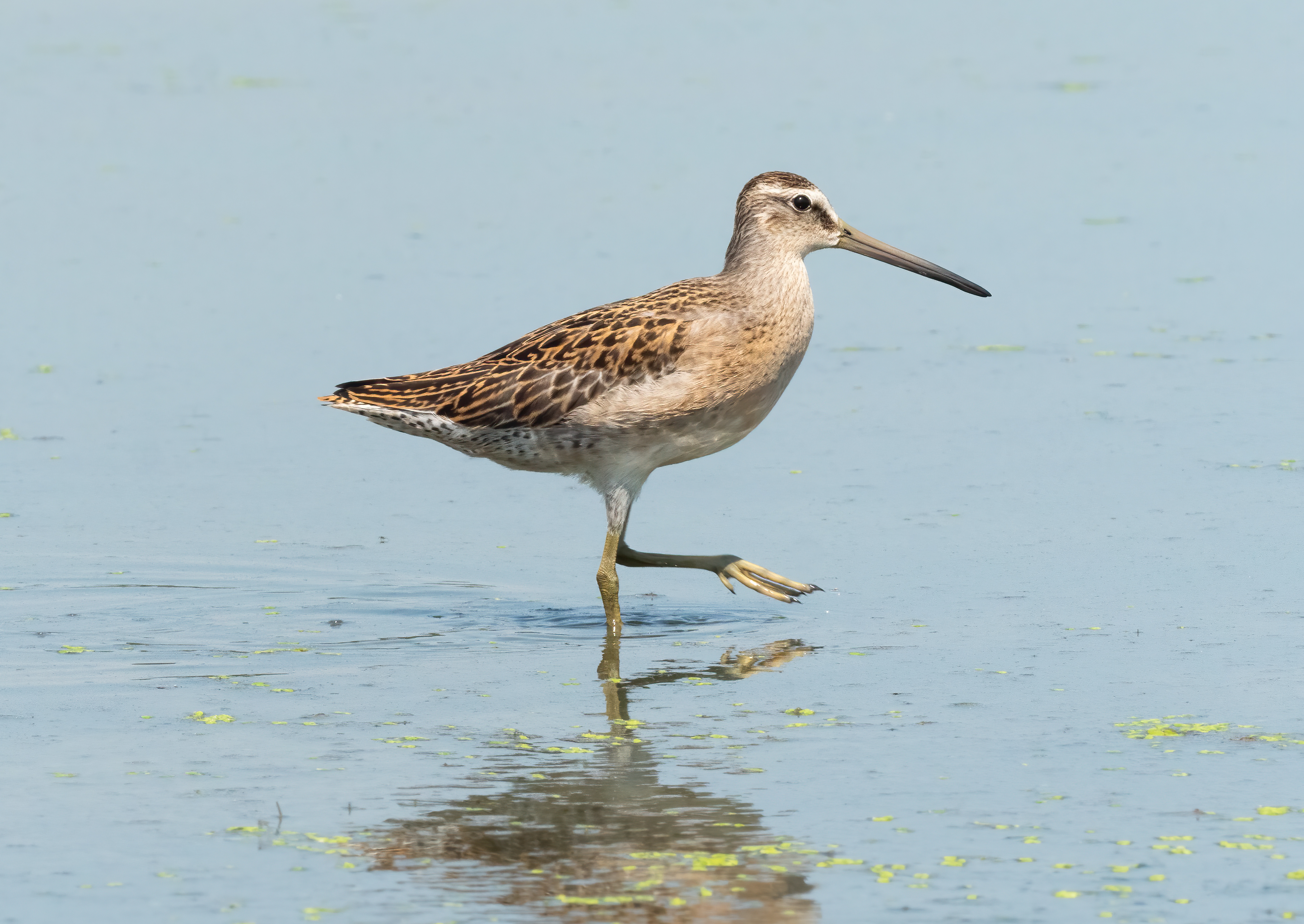

Conservation status
- Vulnerable (IUCN 3.1)

Scientific classification
- Kingdom: Animalia
- Phylum: Chordata
- Class: Aves
- Order: Charadriiformes
- Family: Scolopacidae
- Genus: Limnodromus
- Species: L. griseus

Binomial name
- Limnodromus griseus (Gmelin, JF, 1789)
- Breeding Migration Nonbreeding

Synonyms
- Scolopax grisea Gmelin, 1789

= Short-billed dowitcher =

Species of bird

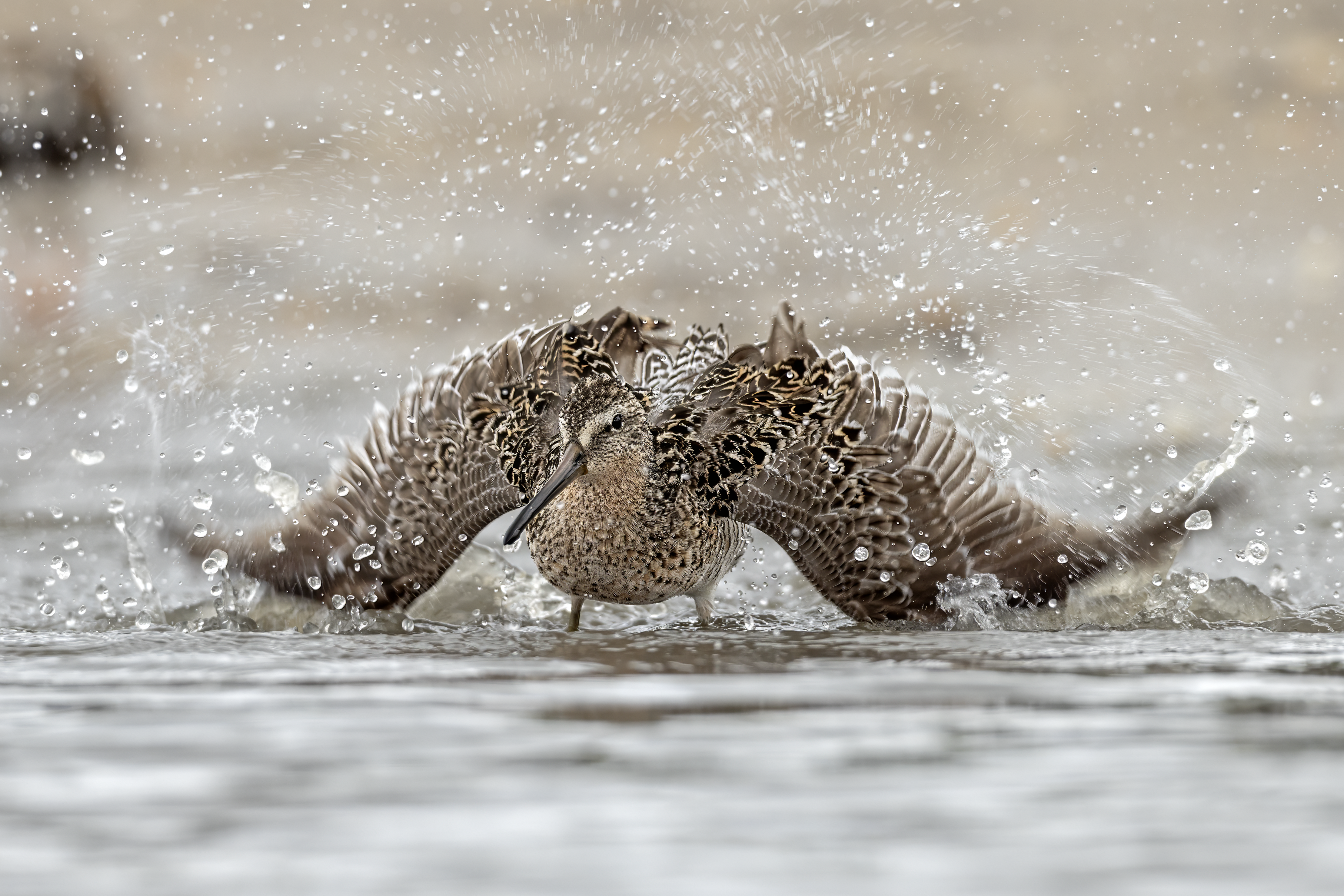
A short-billed dowitcher bathing in the Delaware Bay.

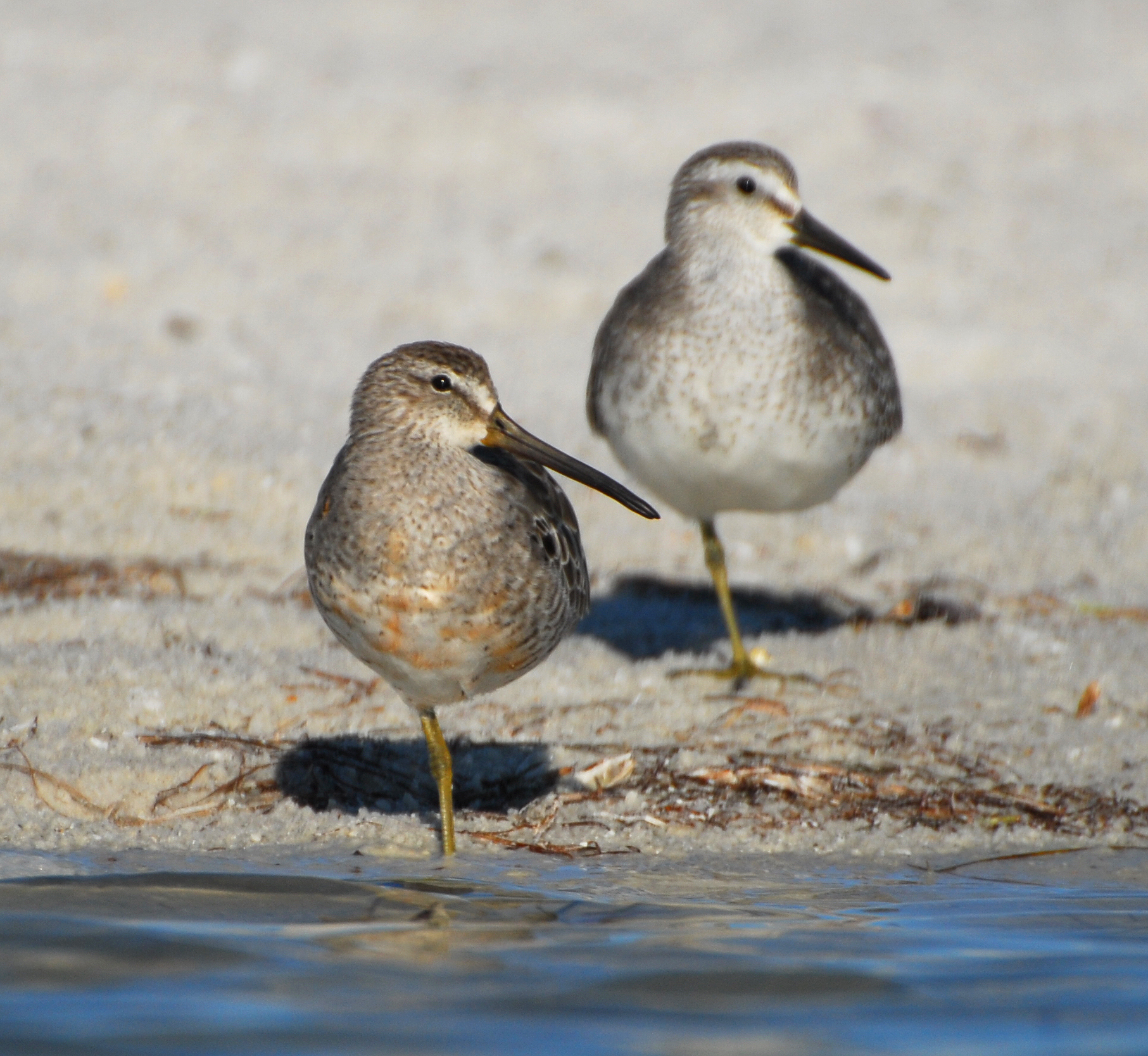
Adult in foreground, red knot in background

The short-billed dowitcher (Limnodromus griseus), like its congener, the long-billed dowitcher, is a medium-sized, stocky, long-billed shorebird in the family Scolopacidae.

It is an inhabitant of North America, Central America, the Caribbean, and northern South America. It is strongly migratory; it completely vacates its breeding areas during the snow-bound months. This species favors a variety of habitats, including tundra in the north to ponds and mudflats in the south. It feeds on invertebrates often by rapidly probing its bill into mud in a sewing machine fashion. It and the very similar long-billed dowitcher were considered one species until 1950. Field identification of the two American Limnodromus remains difficult today. Distinguishing wintering or juvenile short-billed dowitchers from the long-billed species is very difficult and, even given examination of their subtlety different body shapes, cannot always be isolated to a particular species. They differ most substantially in vocalizations. The names of American dowitchers are misleading, as there is much overlap in their bill lengths. Only a small percentage can be identified by this character alone.

== Taxonomy ==
The short-billed dowitcher was formally described in 1789 by the German naturalist Johann Friedrich Gmelin in his revised and expanded edition of Carl Linnaeus's Systema Naturae. He placed it in the genus Scolopax and coined the binomial name Scolopax grisea. Gmelin based his description on the "brown snipe" from the coast of New York, described in 1785 by the English ornithologist John Latham and the Welsh naturalist Thomas Pennant. The short-billed dowitcher is now placed in the genus Limnodromus, that was introduced in 1833 by Prince Maximilian of Wied-Neuwied. The genus name combines the Ancient Greek limnē, meaning "marsh," with -dromos, meaning "-racer" or "-runner." The specific griseus is Medieval Latin, meaning "grey." The English name "dowitcher" is from Iroquois and was first recorded in 1841.

Three subspecies are recognised:

- Limnodromus griseus caurinus Pitelka, 1950 – Breeds: Gulf of Alaska and inland central-south Alaska, southwest Yukon and montane northwest British Columbia (northwest Canada). Winters: central USA to Peru
- Limnodromus griseus hendersoni Rowan, 1932 – Breeds: central-north Alberta to west Manitoba (central Canada). Winters: southeast USA to Panama
- Limnodromus griseus griseus (Gmelin, JF, 1789) – Breeds: southwest Hudson Bay and James Bay to west Labrador (central-east Canada). Winters: South USA to Brazil

== Description ==
Adults' bodies are dark brown on top and reddish underneath. The tail has a black-and-white barred pattern, and the legs are yellowish.

The three subspecies have slight variations in appearance:

- Limnodromus griseus griseus has a white belly and barred flanks.
- Limnodromus griseus hendersoni has a reddish belly and spotted flanks.
- Limnodromus griseus caurinus has a white belly, heavily barred flanks, and a densely spotted breast.

None of these combines the reddish belly and barred flanks of the breeding plumage of the long-billed dowitcher. The winter plumage is largely grey. This bird can range from 23 to 32 cm (9.1 to 12.6 in) in length, 46 to 56 cm (18 to 22 in) in wingspan and 73–155 g (2.6–5.5 oz) in body mass.

The call of this bird is more mellow than that of the long-billed dowitcher, and is useful in identification, particularly of the difficult adult plumages.

== Distribution and habitat ==
The breeding habitat of the short-billed dowitcher includes bogs, tidal marshes, mudflats or forest clearings south of the tree line in northern North America. L. g. griseus breeds in northern Quebec; L. g. hendersoni breeds in north central Canada; L. g. caurinus breeds in southern Alaska and southern Yukon.

The birds migrate to the southern United States and as far south as Brazil. This bird is more likely to be seen near ocean coasts during migration than the long-billed dowitcher. This species occurs in western Europe only as a scarce vagrant.

== Behavior and ecology ==
=== Breeding ===
These birds nest on the ground, usually near water. Their nests are shallow depressions in clumps of grass or moss lined with fine grasses, twigs and leaves. They lay four, sometimes three, olive-buff to brown eggs. Incubation lasts for 21 days and is done by both sexes.

The downy juvenile birds leave the nest soon after hatching. Parental roles are not well known, but it is believed that the female departs and leaves the male to tend the chicks, which find all their food.

=== Food and feeding ===
These birds forage by probing in shallow water or on wet mud. They mainly eat insects, mollusks, crustaceans, and marine worms, but they also eat some plant material.
