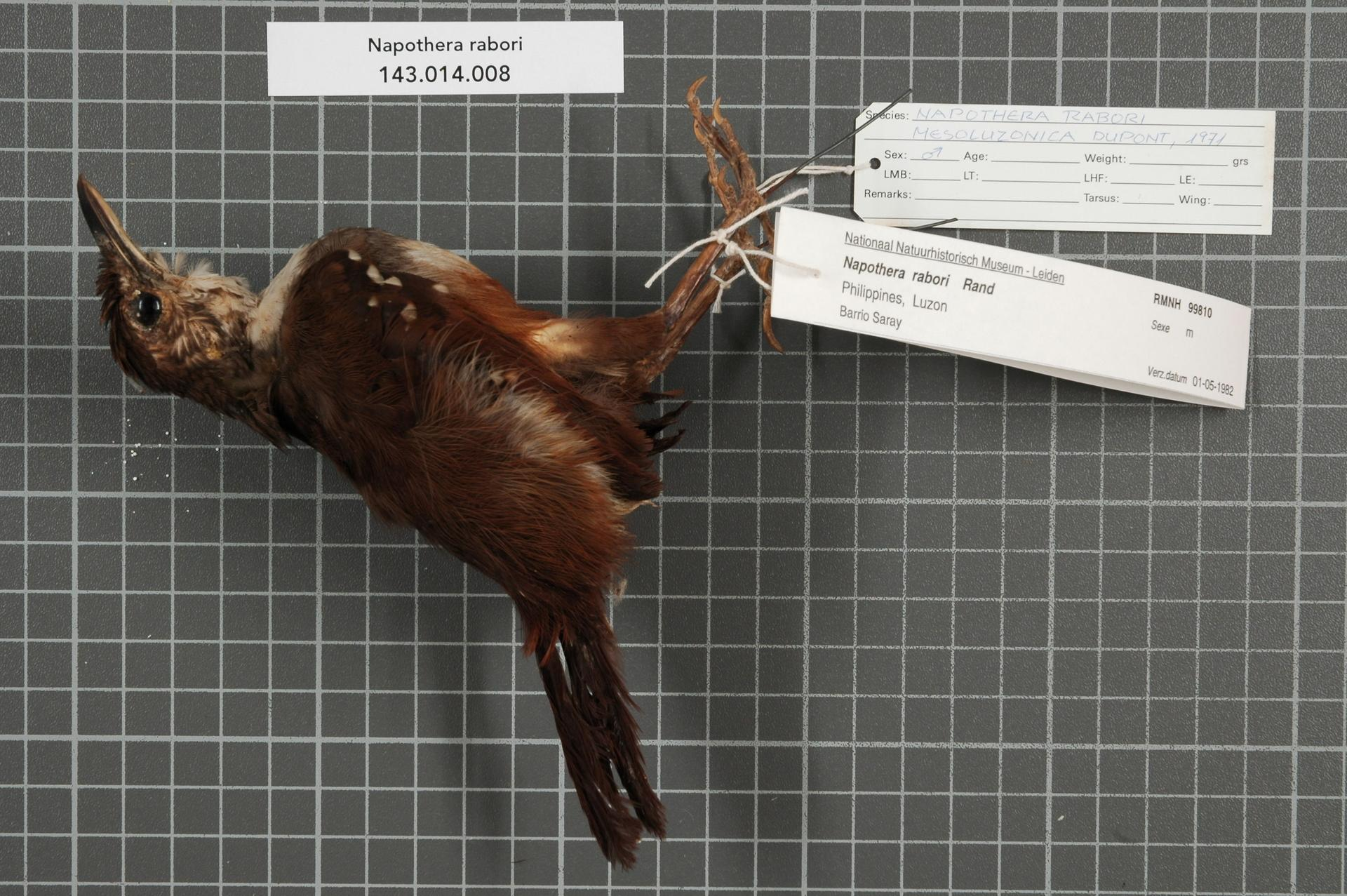
- Museum specimen

Conservation status
- Near Threatened (IUCN 3.1)

Scientific classification
- Kingdom: Animalia
- Phylum: Chordata
- Class: Aves
- Order: Passeriformes
- Family: Locustellidae
- Genus: Robsonius
- Species: R. rabori

Binomial name
- Robsonius rabori (Rand, 1960)
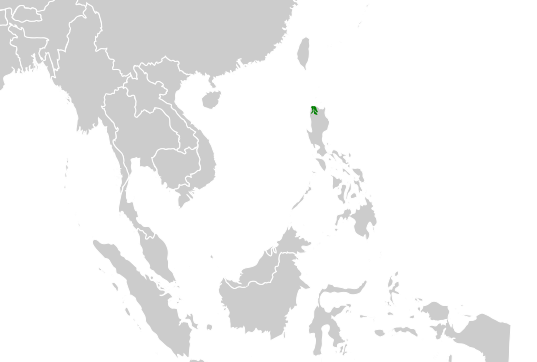

Synonyms
- Napothera rabori

= Cordillera ground warbler =

Species of bird

The Cordillera ground warbler (Robsonius rabori), also known as Rabor's wren-babbler or the Luzon wren-babbler, is a species of bird currently placed in the family Locustellidae. It is endemic to the Philippines, where it is found in northwest Luzon in the foothills of the Cordillera Mountain Range.s natural habitat is tropical moist lowland forests. It was formerly conspecific and forms a species complex with the Bicol ground warbler and Sierra Madre ground warbler, which are some of most elusive birds in the country due to their extremely shy nature. Among these three elusive species, the Cordillera ground warbler is the rarest and most threatened. It has only been photographed once in the wild. It is threatened by habitat loss.

== Description and taxonomy ==
The Cordillera ground warbler has a length of 20–22 cm (7.9–8.7 in). It has rather notable long legs and a long bill and feet. Its feathers are tipped dusky brown and it has a rusty-chestnut head with a thin whitish eye-ring with a small area of bare gray skin behind the eye. Its throat is white with black tips on the sides. The breast is a medium neutral gray with a distinct grayish triangular pattern, with feather shafts slightly paler, and a white belly. It also has chestnut to dark brown wings with each feather tucked in so that they appear mostly chestnut when folded. It has brown upperparts with two dotted white wingbars. The bird sings very high-pitched songs with the sound of tseeee sip tseeee!, which often last between approximately 1.6 and 2.2 seconds.

It is differentiated from the Bicol ground warbler and Sierra Madre ground warbler by the grayish triangular markings on its belly.

The Cordillera ground warbler was described by the Canadian zoologist Austin L. Rand in 1960 and given the binomial name Napothera rabori. The specific epithet was chosen to honour Dioscoro S. Rabor who had collected the type specimen on the Philippine island of Luzon.

Ground warblers were first discovered in 1959 by an expedition team headed by Dioscoro S. Rabor. They conducted walking surveys of 2,000 meters each and recorded all of the bird calls they observed. There were initially two varieties discovered, now called the Cordillera ground warbler (Robsonius rabori) and the Bicol ground warbler (Robsonius sorsogonensis). The latter was first observed in 1961. The physical distinctions between them are mainly different coloration and geographic range. Originally, they had been classified as a member of the genus Nathopera because it was believed they were closely related to southeast Asian Napothera babblers. They were later lumped into the same species, but afterwards morphological evidence, behavioral observations, and the phylogeny of these birds led to their reclassification into a different genus, Robsonius, within the family Timaliidae. In 2013, a new species was discovered: the Sierra Madre ground warbler (Robsonius thompsoni). There are two other subspecies of the ground warbler: mesoluzonica and another from the Camarines Sur.

== Behaviour and ecology ==
=== Food and feeding ===
The diet of the Cordillera ground warbler is primarily invertebrates; it has been sighted scouring forest floors for prey hidden under leaves.

=== Breeding ===
Very little is known about its breeding habits. Its nest has yet to be described. A juvenile was collected in May.

== Habitat and conservation status ==
They are found in northwest Luzon in the Cordillera Mountain Range. It is found in lowland moist dipterocarp forest, in primary forest, secondary forest and forest edge up to 500 m. It is typically found on the forest floor among limestone outcrops, bamboo and mossy rocks.

IUCN previously assessed this bird as vulnerable with the population being estimated at 2,500 to 9,999 mature individuals but this was updated to Near-threatened.This downlisting does not mean that this species is increasing but rather reflects data that this species may occurs in higher densities than originally believed. Among the three Robsonius ground-warblers, the Cordilera ground-warbler is the most threatened owing to having the smallest range. This species' main threat is habitat loss due to wholesale clearance of forest habitats as a result of logging, agricultural conversion and mining activities occurring within the range.

This species is found in only one protected area the Kalbario–Patapat Natural Park. The entire Apayao province is listed as a UNESCO Biosphere Reserves of Southeast Asia. However, continued habitat loss and deforestation continues even in protected areas.

Proposals to monitor the species further have been made, and to obtain information about how it can further be protected; however, no other efforts have occurred. Conservation actions proposed include assessing the population size and establishing a monitoring programme to quantify trends; establishing its ability to persist in degraded habitats; identifying and assessing threats; and ensuring that Kalbario–Patapat Natural Park is more effectively protected.
