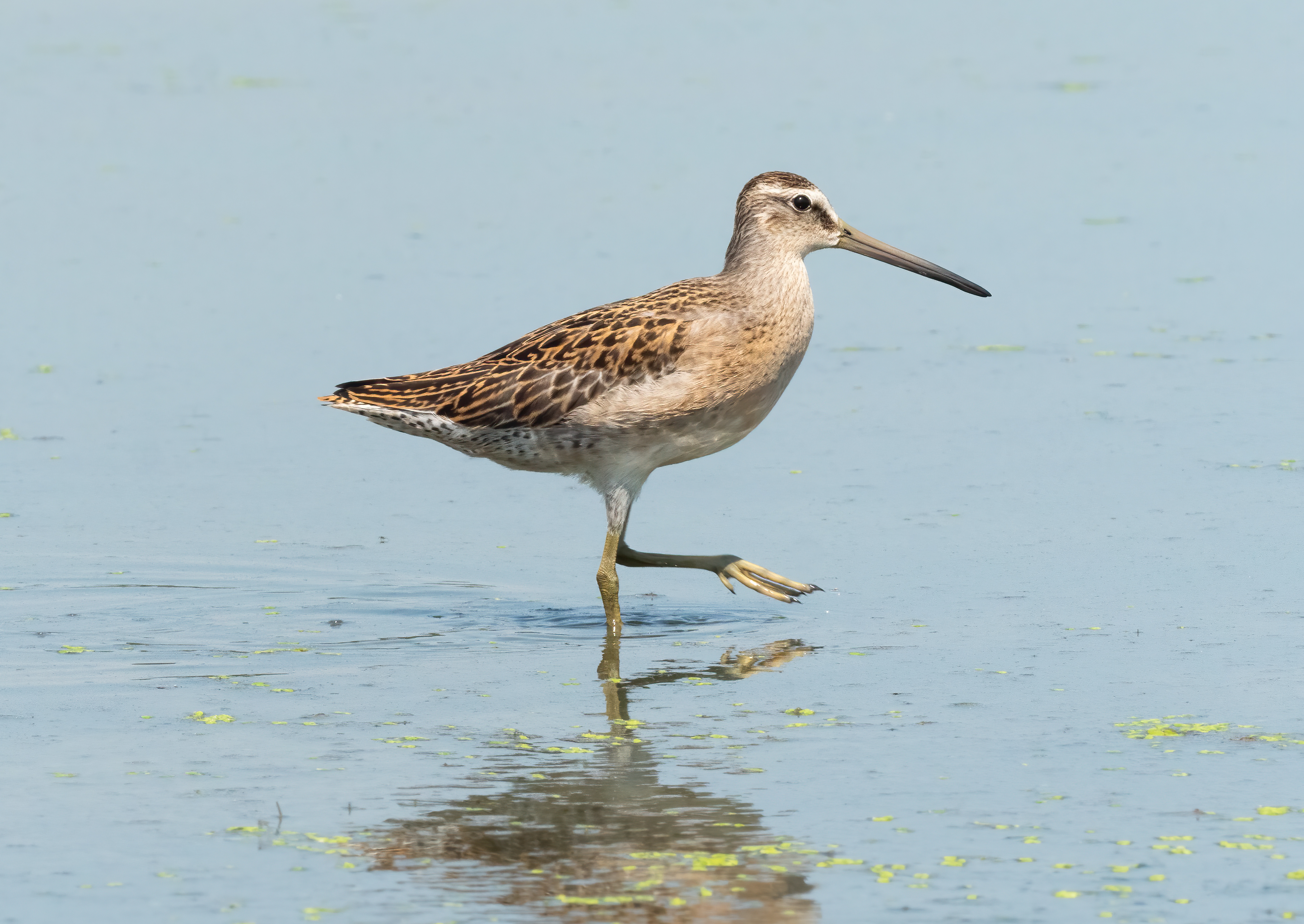
- Short-billed dowitcher (Limnodromus griseus)

Scientific classification
- Kingdom: Animalia
- Phylum: Chordata
- Class: Aves
- Order: Charadriiformes
- Family: Scolopacidae
- Subfamily: Scolopacinae
- Genus: Limnodromus; Wied-Neuwied, 1833

Type species
- Scolopax noveboracensis = Scolopax grisea Gmelin. JF, 1789

= Dowitcher =

Genus of birds

The three dowitchers are medium-sized long-billed wading birds in the genus Limnodromus. The English name "dowitcher" is from Iroquois, recorded in English by the 1830s.

They resemble godwits in body and bill shape, and the reddish underparts in summer, but are much shorter legged, more like snipes, to which they are more closely related. All three are strongly migratory.

The two North American species are difficult to separate in most plumages, and were considered a single species for many years. The Asian bird is rare and not well known.

== Taxonomy ==
The genus Limnodromus was introduced in 1833 by the German naturalist Prince Maximilian of Wied-Neuwied to accommodate a single species, the short-billed dowitcher. The name combines the Ancient Greek limnē meaning "marsh" with -dromos meaning "-racer" or "-runner".

The dowitcher species are:

Genus Limnodromus – Wied-Neuwied, 1833 – three species
Common name	Scientific name and subspecies	Range	Size and ecology	IUCN status and estimated population
Short-billed dowitcher	Limnodromus griseus (Gmelin, JF, 1789) Three subspecies: L. g. caurinus Pitelka, 1950; L. g. hendersoni Rowan, 1932; L. g. griseus (Gmelin, JF, 1789)	North America, Central America, the Caribbean, and northern South America	Size: Habitat: Diet:	VU
Long-billed dowitcher	Limnodromus scolopaceus (Say, 1822)	North America	Size: Habitat: Diet:	NT
Asian dowitcher	Limnodromus semipalmatus (Blyth, 1848)	Siberia and Manchuria.	Size: Habitat: Diet:	NT
