= Angola greenbul =

Conservation status
- Least Concern (IUCN 3.1)

Scientific classification
- Kingdom: Animalia
- Phylum: Chordata
- Class: Aves
- Order: Passeriformes
- Family: Pycnonotidae
- Genus: Phyllastrephus
- Species: P. viridiceps

Binomial name
- Phyllastrephus viridiceps Rand, 1955

Species of songbird

The Angola greenbul (Phyllastrephus viridiceps) is a species of passerine bird in the bulbul family, Pycnonotidae. It is found in northwest Angola. Its natural habitats are subtropical or tropical moist lowland forests and subtropical or tropical moist montane forests. It was formerly considered to be a subspecies of the white-throated greenbul.

== Taxonomy ==
The Angola greenbul was formally described in 1955 by the Canadian zoologist Austin L. Rand based on specimens collected near the town of Cambeta in northern Angola. He considered it to be a subspecies of the white-throated greenbul and coined the trinomial name Phyllastrephus albigularis viridiceps. It is now considered as a separate species based on differences in vocalization and morphology. The genus name combines Ancient Greek φυλλον/phullon meaning "leaf" with στρεφω/strephō meaning "to toss" or "to turn". The specific epithet viridiceps combines Latin viridis meaning "green" with -ceps meaning "-crowned".
