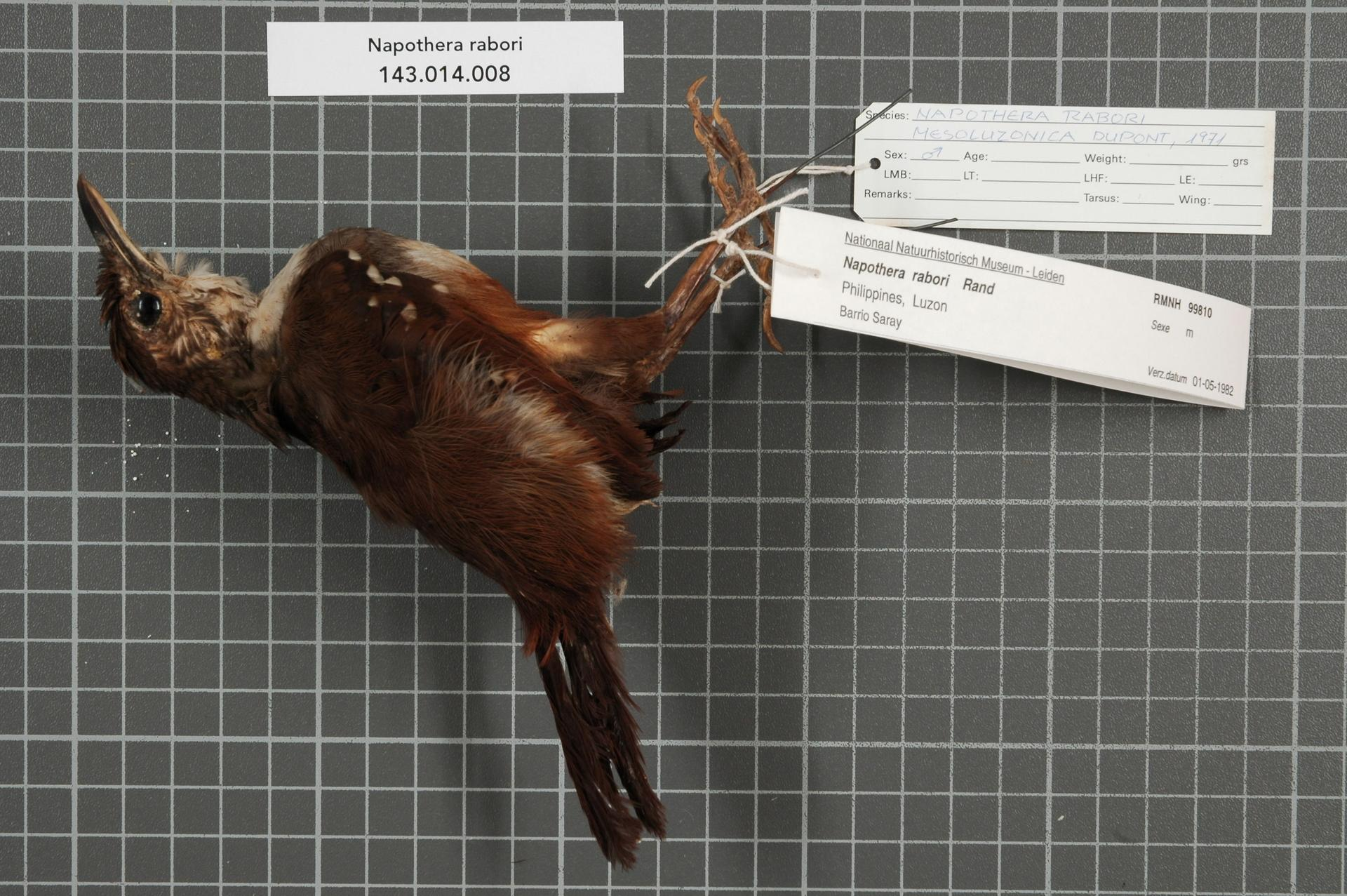

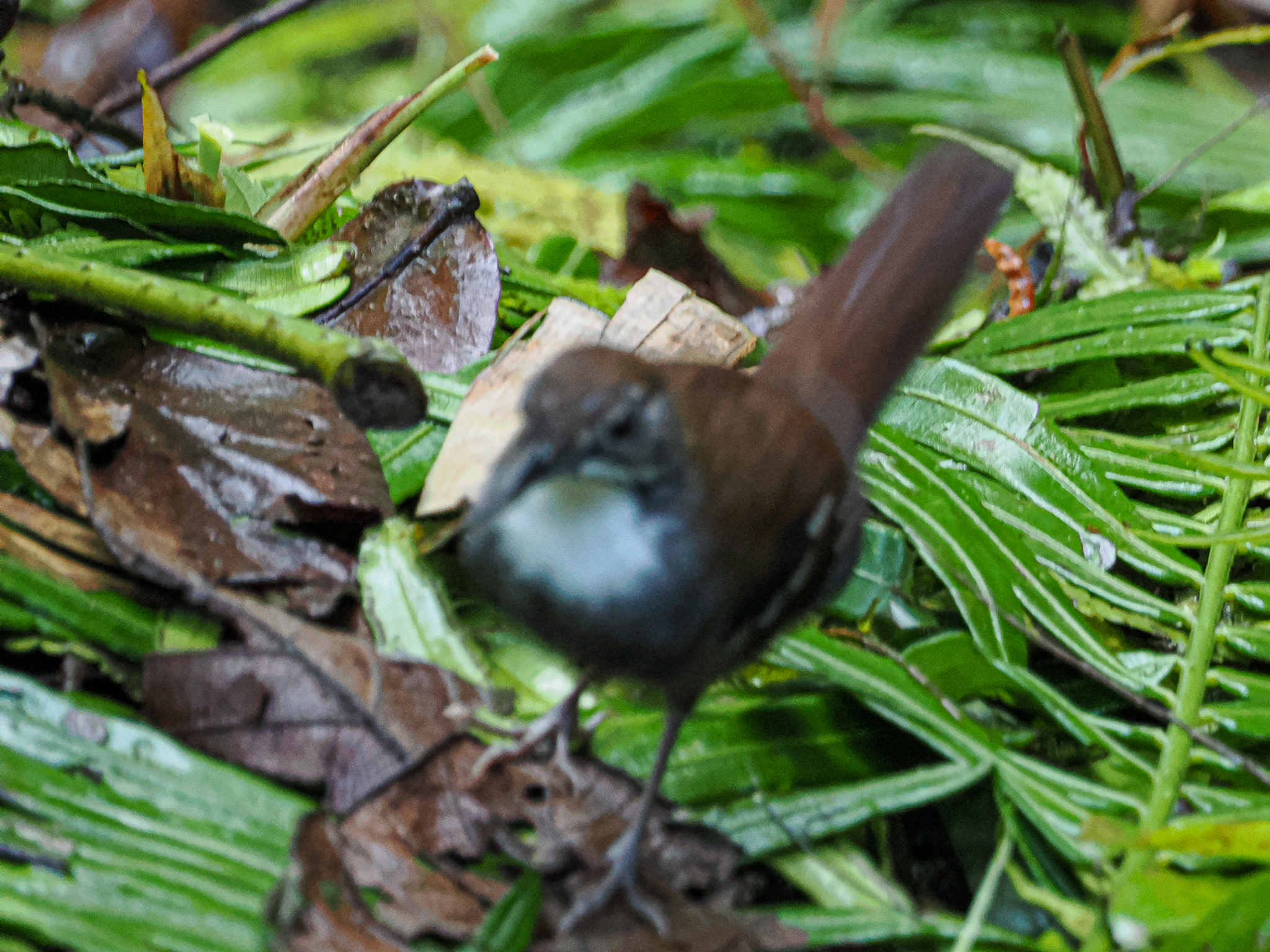

Conservation status
- Near Threatened (IUCN 3.1)

Scientific classification
- Kingdom: Animalia
- Phylum: Chordata
- Class: Aves
- Order: Passeriformes
- Family: Locustellidae
- Genus: Robsonius
- Species: R. sorsogonensis

Binomial name
- Robsonius sorsogonensis (Rand & Rabor, 1967)
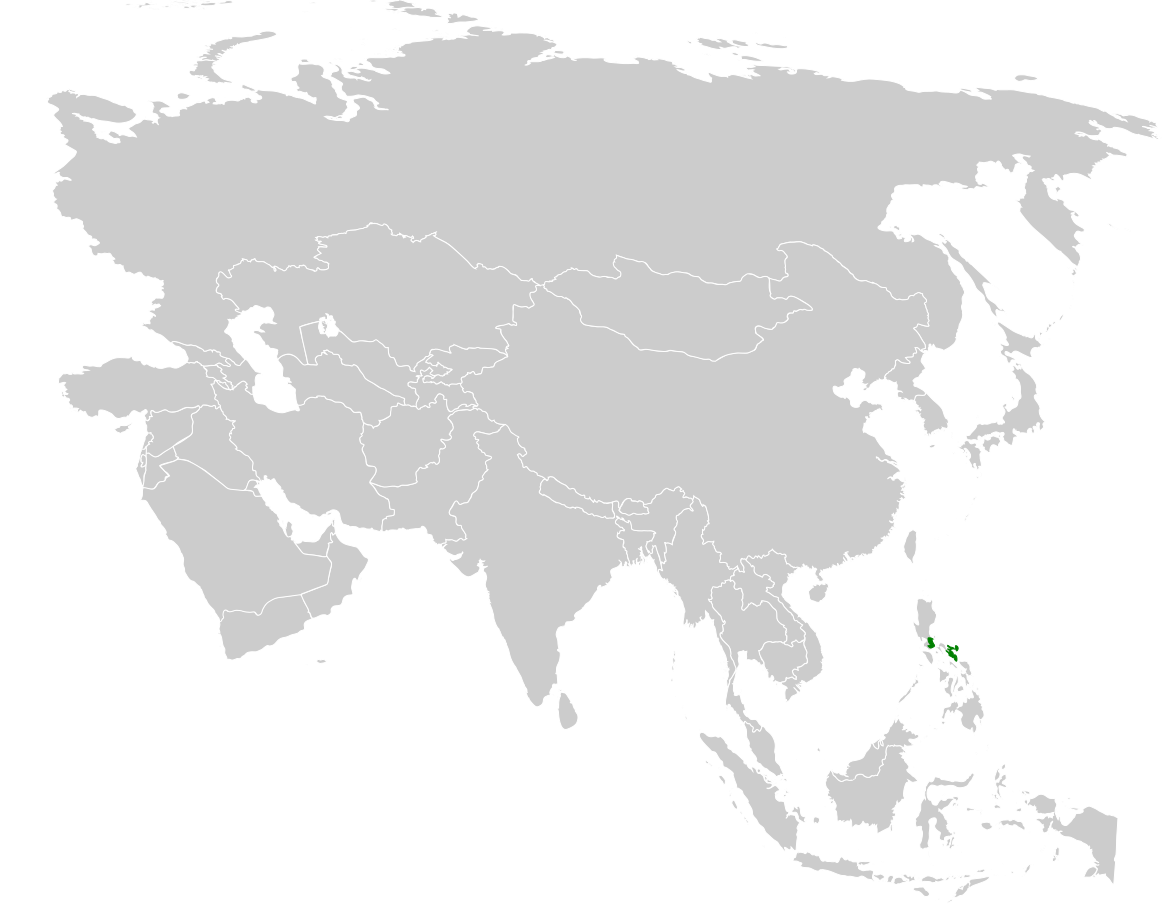

Synonyms
- Napothera sorsogonensis

= Bicol ground warbler =

Species of bird

The Bicol ground warbler (Robsonius sorsogonensis) is a species of passerine bird in the family Locustellidae. It is native to southern Luzon and Catanduanes in the Philippines. It was formerly conspecific and forms a species complex with the Cordillera ground warbler and Sierra Madre ground warbler, which are some of most elusive birds in the country due to their extremely shy nature. Its natural habitat is tropical moist lowland forest. It is threatened by habitat loss.

== Description and taxonomy ==
The Bicol ground warbler is described as a stout bird with long legs and large feet. It has a gray band across the chest and a white throat. Its song is high pitched and is noted for its ventriloquial nature which makes it extremely difficult to pin point which direction they are singing from.

The three species of ground warblers are similar in size, shape and in the coloration of their juvenile plumage, but they differ from one another in their adult plumage coloration.It is differentiated from the Cordillera ground warbler and Sierra Madre ground warbler by its more brownish gray rathern than rusty brown plummage, a white throat and a gray breastband without scaling.

The Bicol ground warbler was described by the ornithologists Austin L. Rand and Dioscoro S. Rabor in 1967 and given the binomial name Napothera sorsogonensis where it was conspecific with the Cordillera ground warbler and Sierra Madre ground warbler. The specific epithet is from the name of the province Sorsogon in the Bicol Region of the Philippines where the species was first discovered. It was initially believed to belong to the Old World babblers family Timaliidae and given the English name "grey-banded babbler" but this was changed to "Bicol ground warbler" when its taxonomic position was better understood. It is now placed in the genus Robsonius that was introduced by the English ornithologist Nigel J. Collar in 2006.

== Behaviour and ecology ==
=== Food and feeding ===
Based on the stomach contents of a collected specimen, the diet of the Bicol ground warbler is primarily invertebrates; it has been sighted scouring forest floors for prey hidden under leaves. While foraging it is known to cock its tail anywhere from 30 to 60 degrees.

There is a feeding station in Real, Quezon wherein an individual eats superworms.

=== Breeding ===
Very little is known about its breeding habits. It breeds from February to August with a fledgling observed in late February. Nest is a large dome with a front entrance slightly above the ground. Clutch size is 2 white eggs with red speckles.

== Habitat and conservation status ==
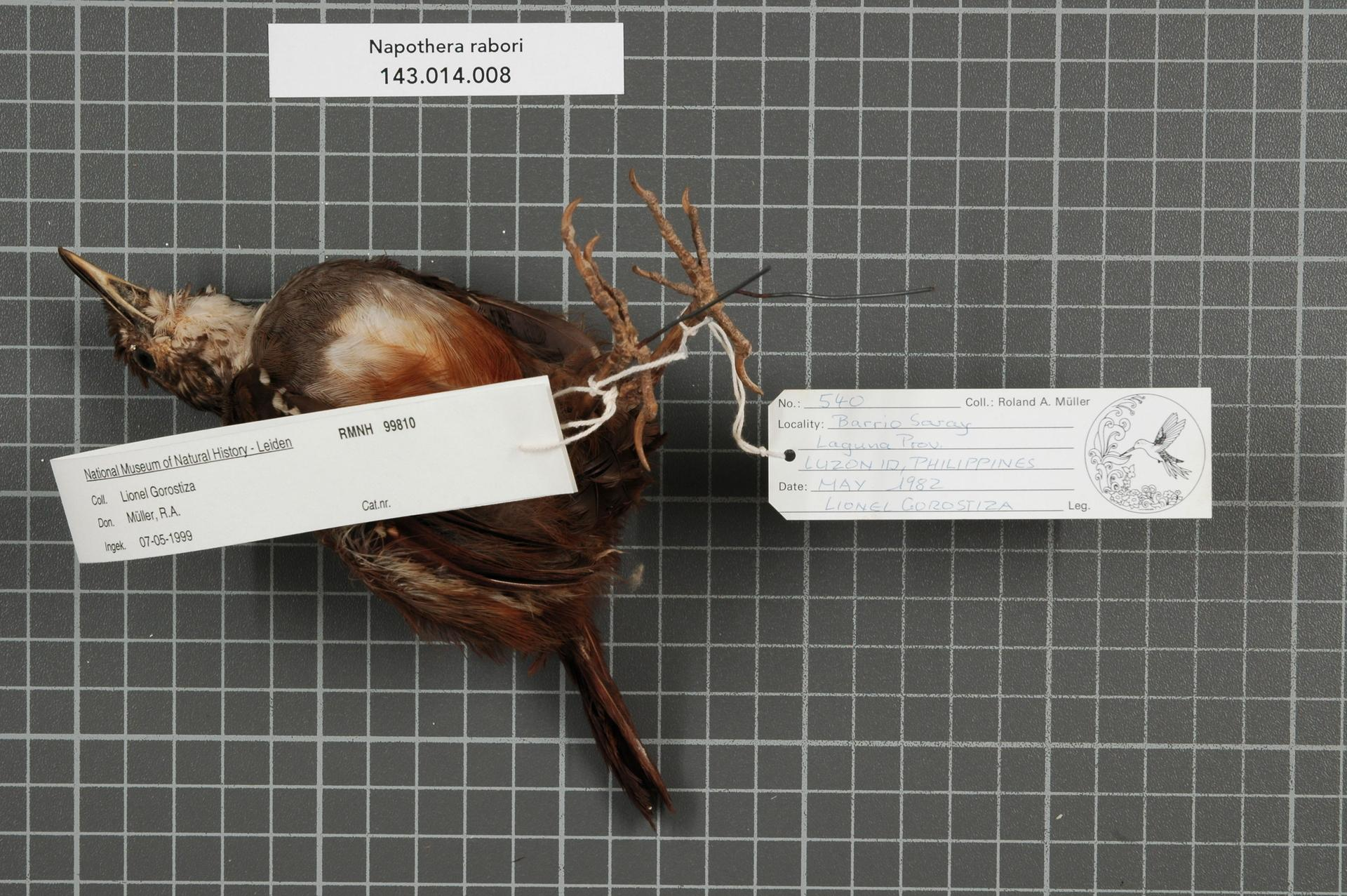
A bottom view of a stuffed specimen in the Naturalis Biodiversity Center

It is found in lowland moist dipterocarp forest in primary forest, secondary forest and forest edge up to 1,000 m. It is typically found among limestone outcrops, bamboo and mossy rocks.

IUCN has assessed this bird as near threatened. The population size has not been quantified, but it is plausible that the species numbers less than 10,000 mature individuals. This species' main threat is habitat loss with wholesale clearance of forest habitats as a result of logging, agricultural conversion and mining activities occurring within the range.

It is found in two protected areas in Quezon Protected Landscape and Mount Isarog National Park; however, like most areas in the Philippines protection is lax.

Conservation actions proposed include assessing the population size and establishing a monitoring programme to quantify trends; establishing its ability to persist in degraded habitats; identifying and assessing threats; and ensuring that the Quezon Protected Landscape and Mount Isarog National Park are more effectively protected.
