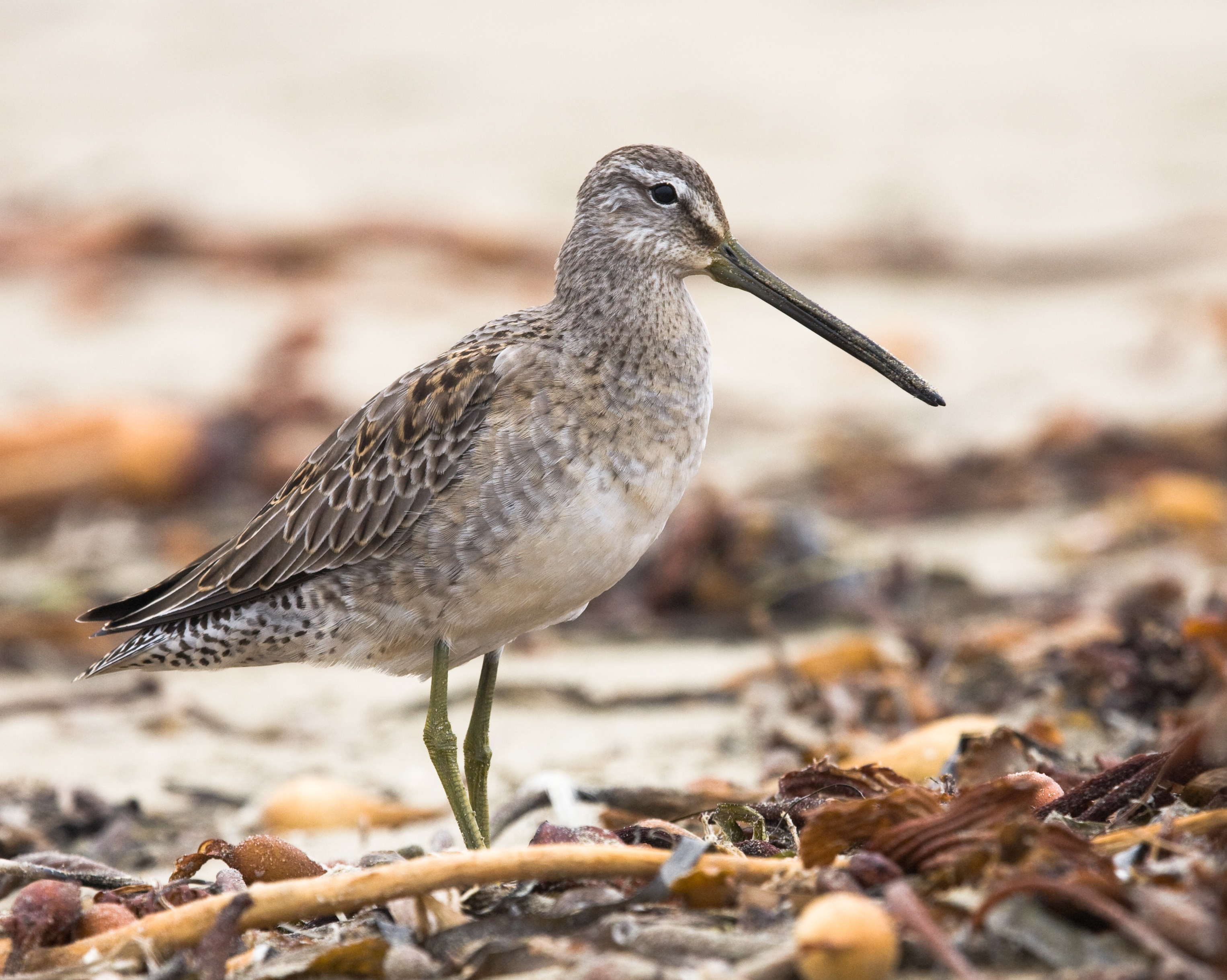
- Non-breeding adult
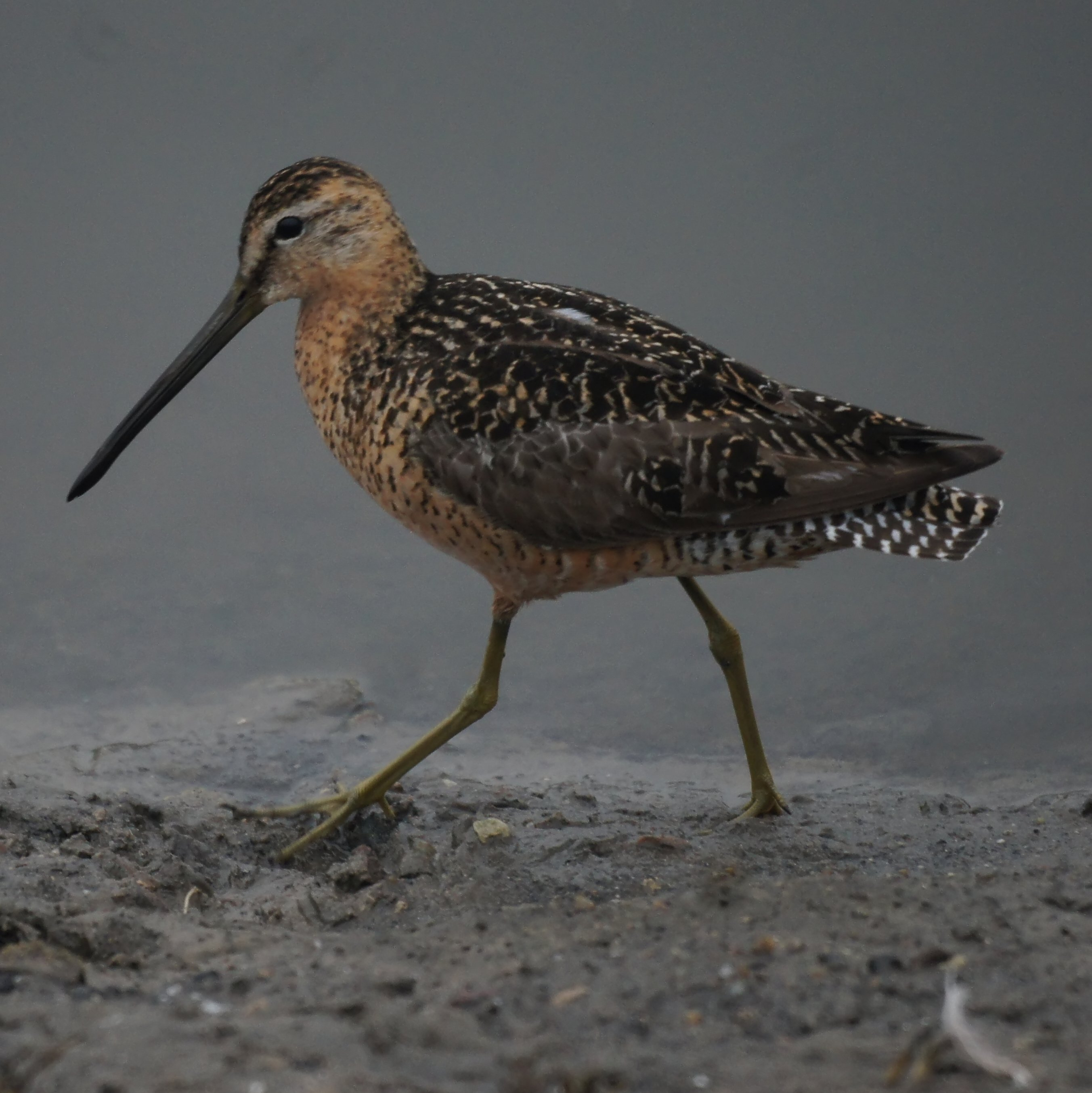
- Breeding adult

Conservation status
- Near Threatened (IUCN 3.1)

Scientific classification
- Kingdom: Animalia
- Phylum: Chordata
- Class: Aves
- Order: Charadriiformes
- Family: Scolopacidae
- Genus: Limnodromus
- Species: L. scolopaceus

Binomial name
- Limnodromus scolopaceus (Say, 1822)
- Breeding range (orange), migration range (yellow), nonbreeding range (blue)

Synonyms
- Limosa scolopacea Say, 1823

= Long-billed dowitcher =

Species of bird

The long-billed dowitcher (Limnodromus scolopaceus) is a medium-sized shorebird with a relatively long bill belonging to the sandpiper family, Scolopacidae. In breeding plumage, adults are characterized by a rufous head and underparts with a darker mottled back and a large white upper rump only seen in flight. They feed in various freshwater habitats with their bill underwater in a "sewing machine" motion and have a mating display where males chase females in flight. The genus, Limnodromus is Ancient Greek from limne, "marsh" and dromos, "racer". The specific scolopaceus is Neo-Latin for "snipe-like", from Latin scolopax, scolopacis, a snipe or woodcock. The English name is from Iroquois and was first recorded in 1841.

The long-billed dowitcher is similar in appearance to the short-billed dowitcher and was only recognized as a separate species in 1950. Between the two, the best distinguishing field mark is their flight call, especially in winter, when the two species' plumage can be nearly identical. However, the two species differ ecologically in their habitat preferences and breeding locations. Long-billed dowitchers generally prefer freshwater habitats, and breed in northern Alaska and Siberia; their short-billed counterparts favor saltwater habitats and breed farther east, from southern Alaska across Canada to the maritime provinces.

== Taxonomy ==
The long-billed dowitcher is a bird in the order Charadriiformes, which includes shorebirds, gulls, and alcids. It is part of the Scolopacidae family, and it belongs to the Scolopacinae subfamily along with snipes and woodcocks. Its genus Limnodromus includes only two other species; the short-billed dowitcher and the Asian dowitcher.

The long-billed dowitcher was first described by Thomas Say in 1823 under the name Limnodromus scolopacea. The taxonomy of the long-billed and short-billed dowitcher has presented difficulties in part due to the variability of the short-billed dowitcher.

For around 100 years the long-billed dowitcher and short-billed dowitcher were recognized as two distinct species. By 1927 the long-billed dowitcher was made a sub-species of the short-billed dowitcher, as the western form, due to bird observations which were similar to both species linking the two geographically. It was not until Frank Pitelka published his monograph, in 1950, that the two dowitcher species were once again accepted as being two distinct species. Further research has shown that the two species are estimated to have diverged genetically more than four million years ago.

== Description ==
The long-billed dowitcher is a medium-sized, stocky sandpiper with a bill about twice the length of its head. In all plumages, the long-billed dowitcher has a whitish supercilium and dark loral stripe that continuous past the eye. The tail is barred black and white with the black being almost twice the width of the white and a large distinctive white rump which extends up to the middle of its back.

Long-billed dowitcher are in breeding plumage from approximately May to late August or early September. In breeding plumage, adults are characterized by a dark crown on top of their head and a rufous neck, chest, and belly underneath with black bars on their breast and white barring on flanks when plumage is fresh. The older the feathers get the less the black bars may appear leaving the breast dark redish. The crown and the back are a mix of brown, black and buff markings. Wings and upper-back are mottled with black, buff, and white markings looking overall dark brown.

When in the winter plumage the long-billed dowitcher is very difficult to distinguish in the field from the short-billed dowitcher. In non-breeding plumage, adults are drab grey, with darker upperparts and breast contrasting with paler white belly. The gray of the breast also gradually lightens as it reaches the chin.

The juvenile plumage of the long-billed dowitcher is similar to that of the breeding adult except for being paler. Juvenile long-billed dowitcher can be distinguished from the short-billed dowitcher by the differences in the tertiary feathers. On the long-billed dowitcher these feathers are dark gray with narrow buff edges with internal markings so dull they seem to lack them altogether. In juvenile birds the upper parts are fringed chestnut rather than buffy brown and their uniformly gray breast is slightly demarcated from the pale rufous lower belly and breasts.

The bill of the long-billed dowitcher ranges from 62 mm to 72 mm with males having bill lengths near the smaller scale reflecting their smaller body size. Bills are typically very straight and black becoming yellowish olive-green near the base and legs are also yellowish. Sexes are almost identical, with females being generally heavier and having longer wings and bill.

Measurements:

- Length: 11.4 inches (29 cm)
- Weight: 3.1–4.6 ounces (88–130 g)
- Wingspan: 18.5–19.3 inches (47–49 cm)

== Habitat and distribution ==
=== Breeding ===
In North America, the long-billed dowitcher breeds mainly throughout western and northern Alaska along the coast from Hooper Bay to w. Mackenzie and south to the foothills of Brooks Range. In this range, while nesting it greatly prefers wet, grass or sedge freshwater meadows but it is also sometimes confined to marshes and will move to lakes, ponds, or estuaries to forage after nesting. In eastern Siberia it breeds from the lower Yana River to Chukotka Peninsula and Anadyr Lowlands with an apparent westward expansion in Russia, also commonly nesting along Bering Sea and inland along rivers draining into the East Arctic Sea of Siberia.

=== Non-breeding ===
During the non-breeding season, its range has been difficult to determine due to its similarity to Short-billed dowitchers in winter plumage, especially in areas where both species overlap in which case most birds are identified as "dowitchers". Along the Pacific coast however, it winters in various locations from south-western British Columbia to Baja California, also moving inland to Arizona, New Mexico, Texas, and south to Mexico. Along the Atlantic coast, it winters from North Carolina to Florida, also moving west along the Gulf Coast to Mississippi, Louisiana, and Texas. In the winter, this bird can be found in a much larger variety of habitats ranging from mudflats, flooded wetlands, wet meadows and fields to various lakes and marshes preferring water less than three inches deep. In general, long-billed dowitchers seem to prefer fresh over salt water and muddy over sandy habitats in comparison to short-billed dowitchers.

=== Migration ===
The long-billed dowitcher will migrate later in the fall than the short-billed dowitcher and earlier in the spring. The spring migrations occurs from February to May with birds moving up along the Pacific coast and interior. The long-billed dowitcher will also migrate through the Great Plains on the western side with a vast majority moving through Alberta.

The fall migrations generally occurs from July to October with the adult long-billed dowitcher beginning to migrate south in July while juveniles begin migrating through September to October. From their breeding grounds the long-billed dowitcher will either migrate south along the Pacific Coast, across the Canadian Prairies and down the Great Basin or through Ontario towards Florida.

== Behaviour ==
=== Diet and foraging ===
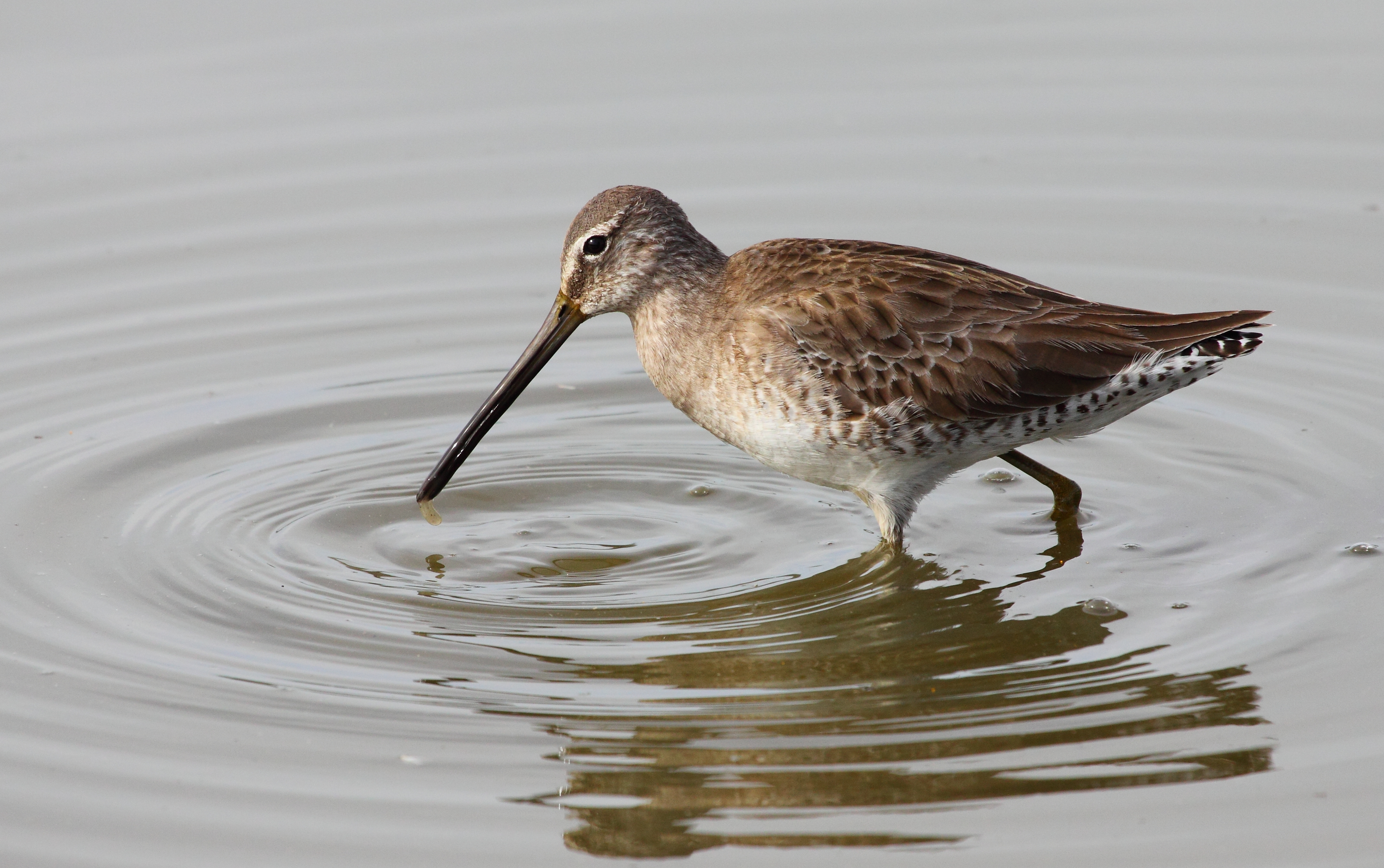
Foraging long-billed dowitcher

Long-billed dowitchers forage by jabbing or probing with a characteristic "sewing machine" motion in shallow water or on wet mud, often with their heads underwater and using tactile receptors on the tip of their bill to locate prey by touch. The long-billed dowitcher, during breeding, consumes large quantities of chironomidae larva and larva of other insects with occasional plant matter and seeds. During migration and in their wintering region, the long-billed dowitcher consumes a far greater range of food types. Dowitchers eat everything from polychaetes to insect larva to crustaceans to mollusks. Also, having night vision, they are known to forage at night during migration.

=== Vocalization ===
The long-billed dowitcher's main call, mostly heard in flight but also while on ground, is a high, sharp keek sometimes repeated as an accelerating quick double or triple note series. Its second, less common call is a tu given 1-8 times. Its song is described as pee-witch-er, and its alarm call is an explosive KEEK. The long-billed dowitcher is a more vocal shorebird often making a keek or tu call, heard when in feeding flocks unlike the short-billed dowitcher which are generally silent on the ground.

=== Reproduction ===
Male long-billed dowitcher will court females by first singing to them and then compete with other males by pursuing the female in flight, displaying an aerial show of speed and agility. After mating, they are known to sing while hovering 15 feet in the air above their territories. Pairs are generally monogamous for a breeding season, but do not retain the same mate for multiple years. Long-billed dowitchers nest in wet areas of tall grasses in the troughs of raised mounds and ridges. The nest is a simple depression in the ground usually lined with grass and leaves.

The long-billed dowitcher lays an average four eggs per brood. The eggs are oval to pear shaped and range from being a buff olive to a greenish or blueish glaucous. The eggs are also heavily splotched with varying shades of brown near the base of the large end with the underlying marks being dark gray. Incubation of the eggs is approximately twenty days in which both sexes participate. Long-billed dowitcher chicks are precocial and downy being able to feed themselves within a few hours of hatching; the male parent looks after the chicks until they have fledged.
