= Louise de Kiriline Lawrence =

Swedish scientist

- Born: Louise Flach; January 30, 1894; Svensksund, Vikbolandet, Sweden
- Died: April 27, 1992 (aged 98); North Bay, Ontario

Louise de Kiriline Lawrence (née Flach; January 30, 1894 – April 27, 1992) was a naturalist, author, and nurse. She was a frequent contributor to the National Audubon Society magazine Audubon.

== Early life ==
Louise de Kiriline Lawrence was born Louise Flach on January 30, 1894, in Svensksund, Vikbolandet, Sweden, to Hillevid Neergaard and Sixten Flach. Her father Sixten was a trained naturalist. He helped to establish the bird sanctuary on Stora Karlsö, an island west of Gotland. Louise's early life was one of wealth and social connections. Her godmother and namesake was Princess Louise of Denmark. At the age of 18, she was presented at court to Gustav V of Sweden.

Visitors to the Flach estate included well-known Swedish naturalists, among them Bruno Liljefors.

== Career ==
De Kiriline Lawrence trained as a nurse and was employed by the Danish Red Cross during World War I. One of her patients in a Denmark camp hospital was a Russian officer, Lt. Gleb Nikoleyevich Kirilin; they married in 1918. He returned to Russia to fight with the White Army in the Russian Civil War, and she followed him there in 1919. After several weeks, the married couple was captured by the Red Army and separated. Louise, after her release, visited Gleb in Moscow. In June 1919, Gleb and other officers were transferred and Louise lost contact with him. Gleb Kirilin disappeared in Siberia where, according to accounts, he was executed. Keeping up hope that Gleb would be found, Louise worked as a nurse in Russia for several years while she searched for him, including work with European Student Relief.

In 1927 de Kiriline Lawrence emigrated to Canada and continued to work as a nurse, joining the outpost service of the Canadian Red Cross Society. Stationed in rural northern Ontario, she became well known as the nurse to the Dionne quintuplets during the first year of their lives. For her work with the quints, she received a King George V Silver Jubilee Medal.

She retired from nursing in 1935, and lived in a cabin in Northern Ontario. She met Leonard Lawrence, a carpenter, and married him in 1939. By this time she had begun a new career as an ornithologist and nature writer. Percy A. Taverner encouraged her to band birds; Doris Huestis Speirs and Margaret Morse Nice also served as mentors to de Kiriline Lawrence. From 1948, she conducted a 15-year correspondence with Alexander Skutch, with whom she shared interests in natural history, field observation, and writing accessible to the general public. W. Earl Godfrey of the National Museum of Canada was also an early mentor. The pair corresponded from 1947 until at least 1959, exchanging information, observations, and specimens. Godfrey acknowledged de Kiriline Lawrence's contributions in his field guide, The Birds of Canada (1966). She is recognized for her study of the red-eyed vireo, which identified the songbird as capable of producing 22,197 distinct calls in a single day. She published nearly twenty scientific papers in The Auk, The Wilson Bulletin, and The Canadian Field-Naturalist and more than 40 articles for Audubon and other popular magazines. De Kiriline Lawrence carried out the majority of her scientific work on her property, located outside of North Bay, Ontario.

Working from the most northerly bird banding station in Ontario, de Kiriline Lawrence made significant contributions to the knowledge of the northern limits of many North American species, chief among them red crossbill, Loxia curvirostra. Her observations and collecting constitute the earliest nest records for this species, as well as an early record of the L. c. bendirei subspecies for Ontario.

== Later life and death ==
Louise de Kiriline Lawrence died on April 27, 1992, in North Bay, Ontario.

== Legacy and recognition ==
In 1954, de Kiriline Lawrence became the first Canadian woman to be named an Elective Member of the American Ornithologists' Union. She received an honorary LL.D. from Laurentian University in 1970. In 2014, the Nipissing Naturalists Club established an annual Louise de Kiriline Lawrence Nature Festival. In 2016, the Club, in partnership with Ontario Heritage Trust, placed a plaque in honor of Louise de Kiriline Lawrence, in Nipissing District. Laurentian University awards five yearly scholarships named for de Kiriline Lawrence.

== Works ==
- de Kiriline, Louise (1936). The Quintuplets' First Year: The Survival of the Five Famous Dionne Babies and Its Significance for All Mothers. Toronto: Macmillan Canada.
- de Kiriline Lawrence, Louise (1945). The Loghouse Nest. Toronto: S.J.R. Saunders Canada. Illustrated by Thoreau MacDonald. Reissued by Natural Heritage Books, 1988, OCLC 304458363.
- de Kiriline Lawrence, Louise (1949). "The Red Crossbill at Pimisi Bay, Ontario". The Canadian Field-Naturalist. 63 (4): 147–160. doi:10.5962/p.341149.
- de Kiriline Lawrence, Louise (1967). "A Comparative Life-History Study of Four Species of Woodpeckers". Ornithological Monographs. 5 (5): 1–156. doi:10.2307/40166747. JSTOR 40166747.
- de Kiriline Lawrence, Louise (April–June 1953). "Nesting Life and Behavior of the Red-eyed Vireo". The Canadian Field-Naturalist. 67 (2): 47–77. doi:10.5962/p.341479.
- de Kiriline Lawrence, Louise (1968). The Lovely and the Wild. New York: McGraw-Hill. Illustrated by Glen Loates. Reissued by McGraw-Hill Ryerson, 1968 and by Natural Heritage Books, 1987, OCLC 281599036.
- de Kiriline Lawrence, Louise (1976). Mar: A Glimpse into the Natural Life of a Bird. Toronto: Clarke, Irwin Canada. Reissued by Natural Heritage Books, 1986, OCLC 15877408.
- de Kiriline Lawrence, Louise (1977). Another Winter, Another Spring: A Love Remembered. New York: McGraw-Hill. Published in Toronto by McGraw-Hill Ryerson, 1977. Reissued by Natural Heritage Books, 1987, OCLC 304481154.
- de Kiriline Lawrence, Louise (1980). To Whom the Wilderness Speaks. Toronto: McGraw-Hill Ryerson. Illustrated by Aletha Karstad. Reissued by Natural Heritage Books, 1989, OCLC 304458509.

== Awards ==
- The Burroughs Medal, 1969, for The Lovely and the Wild
- The Sir Charles G. D. Roberts Special Award, 1969, for The Lovely and the Wild
- Francis H. Kortright Outdoor Writing Award, 1980, for To Whom the Wilderness Speaks
- Doris Huestis Speirs Award, for outstanding lifetime contributions to Canadian ornithology, from the Society of Canadian Ornithologists, 1991

== See also ==
=== Archives ===
There is a Louise de Kiriline Lawrence fonds at Library and Archives Canada. The archival reference number is R4063.

== Bibliography ==
- Ainley, Marianne Gosztonyi (October 1992). "In Memoriam, Louise de Kiriline Lawrence, 1894-1992". The Auk. 109 (4): 909–910. doi:10.2307/4088171. JSTOR 4088171.
- Greer, Kirsten; Bols, Sonje (2016). "'She of the Loghouse Nest': Gendering Historical Ecological Reconstructions in Northern Ontario". Historical Geography. 44: 45–67.
- Simonds, Merilyn (2022). Woman, Watching: Louise de Kiriline Lawrence and the Songbirds of Pimisi Bay. Toronto, ON: ECW Press. ISBN 978-1-77041-659-8.
