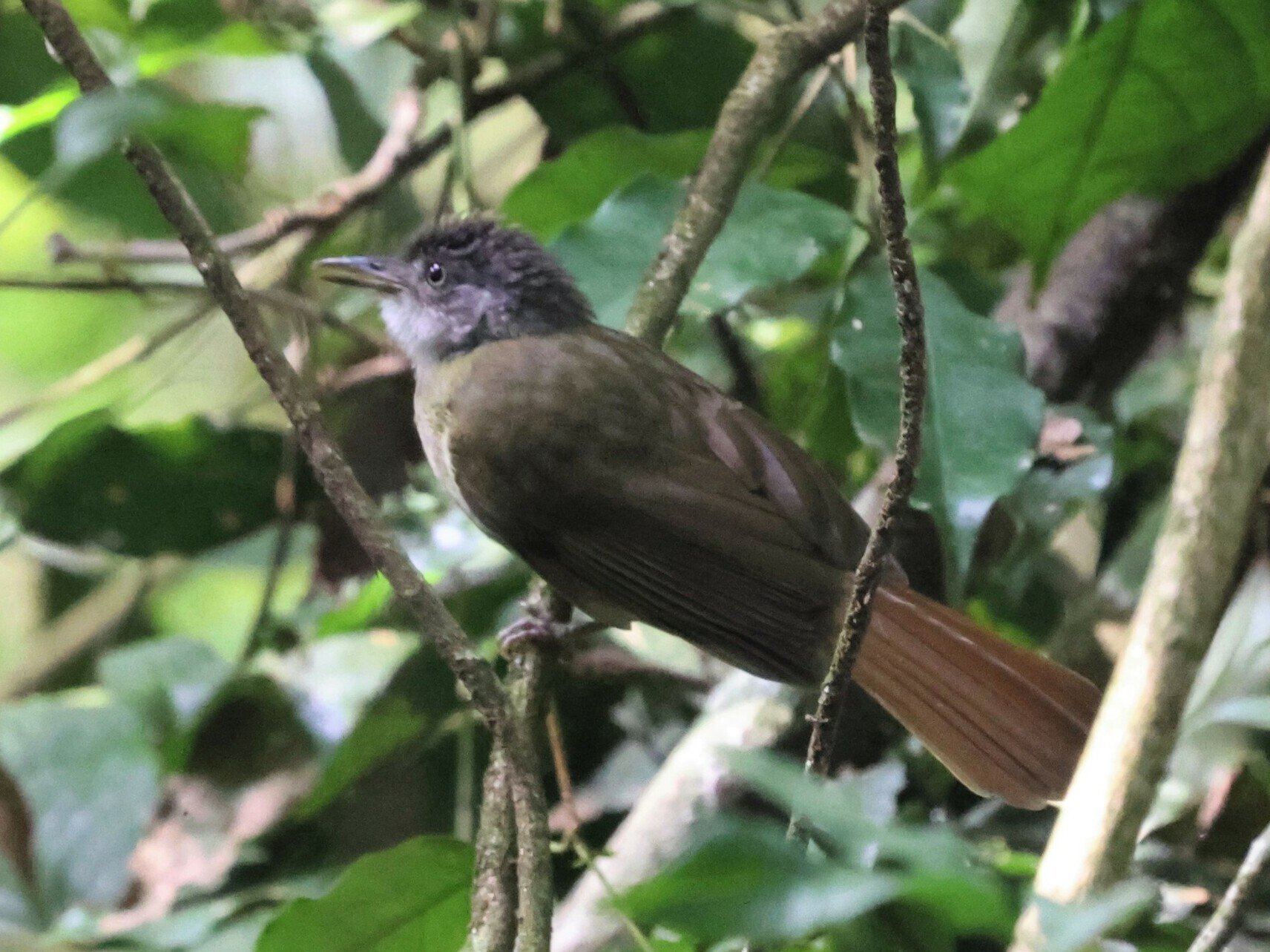

Conservation status
- Least Concern (IUCN 3.1)

Scientific classification
- Kingdom: Animalia
- Phylum: Chordata
- Class: Aves
- Order: Passeriformes
- Family: Pycnonotidae
- Genus: Phyllastrephus
- Species: P. albigularis

Binomial name
- Phyllastrephus albigularis (Sharpe, 1882)
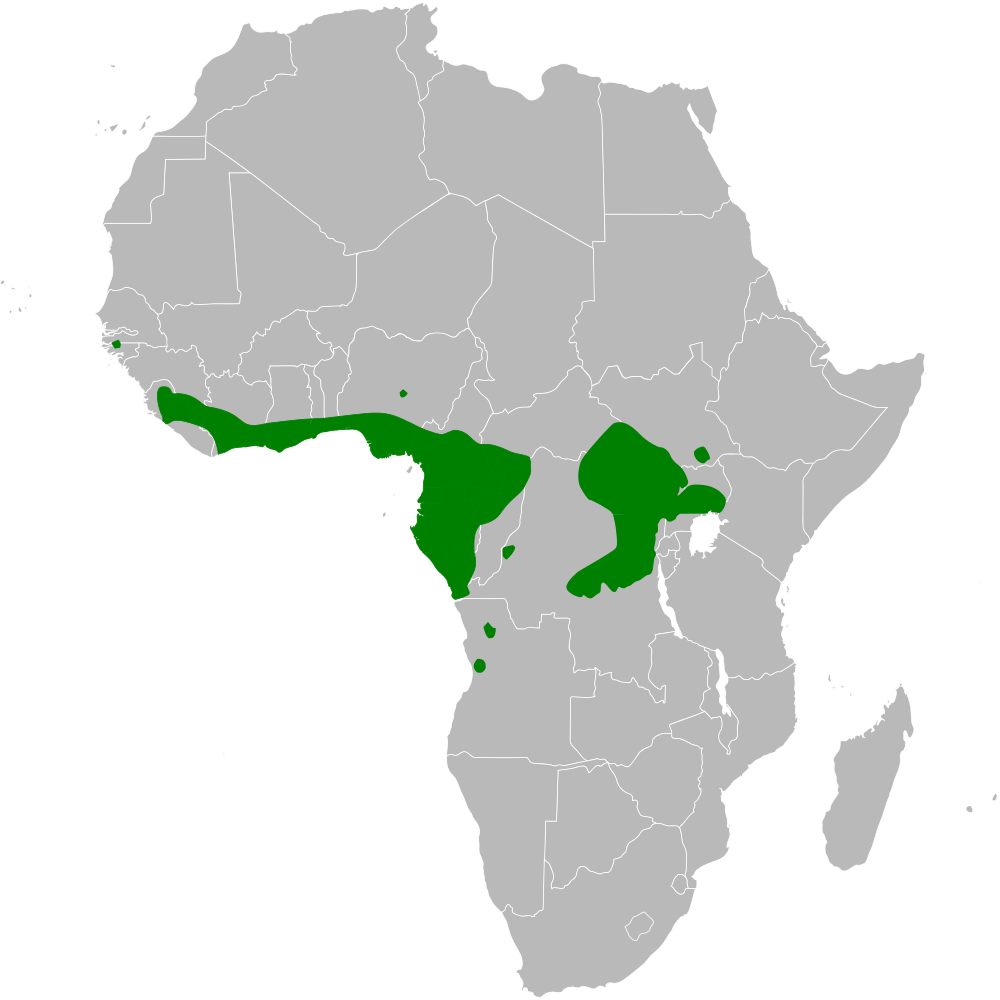

Synonyms
- Xenocichla albigularis

= White-throated greenbul =

Species of songbird

The white-throated greenbul (Phyllastrephus albigularis) or white-throated bulbul, is a species of passerine bird in the bulbul family, Pycnonotidae. It is widespread across the African tropical rainforest. It was formerly considered to be conspecific with the Angola greenbul.

== Taxonomy ==
The white-throated greenbul was formally described and illustrated in 1882 by the English ornithologist Richard Bowdler Sharpe based on a specimen collected in the Fantee region of central Ghana. He coined the binomial name Xenocichla albigularis. It is now one of 21 species placed in the genus Phyllastrephus that was introduced in 1832 by the English naturalist William Swainson. The genus name combines Ancient Greek φυλλον/phullon meaning "leaf" with στρεφω/strephō meaning "to toss" or "to turn". The specific epithet albigularis combines Latin albus meaning "white" with Modern Latin gularis meaning "throated". The Angola greenbul was formally considered to be a subspecies. The white-throated greenbul is now monophyletic: no subspecies are recognised.
