= Elsie Cassels =

Scottish-born naturalist and conservationist (1864–1938)

- Born: Elsie McAlister; February 1864; St. Mary's Loch, Scotland
- Died: 12 November 1938 (aged 74); Red Deer, Alberta, Canada
- Occupations: Naturalist; ornithologist; scientist; conservationist
- Organization: First woman to be Vice-President of a Canadian naturalist society

Elsie Cassels (February 1864 — 12 November 1938) was a Scottish-born naturalist and the first woman to become Vice-President of a Canadian naturalist society. Cassels lived in Red Deer, Alberta, and became a recognised authority across Canada on migratory birds who exchanged information (from detailed observations from 1920 to 1935), with the leading (male) ornithologists of her day, 'her keen enthusiasm stimulated a wide interest in ornithology'. Cassels objected to game hunting for pleasure as a conservationist before this was a common approach to wildlife, and helped found a bird sanctuary and in 1924 one of the first Canadian wildlife refuges at Gaetz Lakes, Alberta.

== Biography ==
Elsie McAlister was born in February 1864 near St. Mary's Loch south of Edinburgh to father, Free Church teacher, Archibald McAlister, and mother Janet Reid. Elsie had three brothers and two sisters and the family lived with another family of four lodgers in Megget; two of her brothers, John and Charles worked in the insurance business, and may have introduced Elsie to the man she later married. In 1899, Elsie married William Cassels, born in Yorkshire, England to Scottish parents, his father Andrew Cassels, vicar of Batley, was known to the Brontë family. William was educated privately at the Edinburgh Academy, when his mother was widowed. The Cassels was an 'irregular' marriage performed by a lodger at the Free Church School House. The couple were from different religious backgrounds with William brought up in the Church of England, and Elsie from the Free Church of Scotland.

The Cassels emigrated to Canada where they were homesteaders (a community where prairie women did physical tasks and frequently undertook traditional male roles on the homestead farms). Their first home was at Wavy Lake, Alberta before moving to a farm at Springvale, then moving into Red Deer.

Journalists wrote in the Red Deer Advocate when William Cassels died in 1941, and his estate was estimated at $90,000 noting 'plenty of money, but Elsie had never been allowed to spend any of it', and among the ornithology community where Cassels was respected, her husband, William was known for his frugality.

Cassels life was based in a log cabin and she developed local nature trails, she identified birdsongs and was a self-taught violinist, called 'a woman of charm and culture' in her obituary. Cassels was childless at a time when that was seen as a stigma. In 1935, Cassels was described in the Calgary Herald, as knowing her birds 'as mothers know their children. Cassels will remain forever young, for she lives in a world of nature and nature never grows old'.

== Ornithology ==
Cassels was among the volunteer ornithologists whose field research made them 'outstanding individuals..who spent entire lifetimes learning about [Alberta] province's flora and fauna and sharing that knowledge with others.' Cassels was a speaker and writer on subjects such as local and migratory birds, botany, and other wildlife.

Cassels became the first female Vice-President of Alberta National History Society.

Cassels was self-educated from her own observations and over a period of fifty years keeping diaries on migratory birds enjoyed correspondence with national institutes and engagement with key Canadian ornithological contacts such as Percy A. Taverner of the Victoria National Museum, Ottawa and William Rowan of University of Alberta, Edmonton, who was a lifelong friend, and whom Cassels helped establish the Gaetz Lakes Sanctuary.

Cassels studies of the habitat and behaviour of birds of prey around her in the prairie were thoroughly documented and quoted in anthologies for her studies of both the barred owl and the gyrfalcon. Her spotting the gyrfalcon, the first record of this species in Alberta, killed in a homestead for attacking turkeys in a domestic setting in 1920, was referred to her own 1922 work and even remarked upon in 1961.

When Cassels became Vice President of the Alberta Natural History Society in 1917, she was not only the first female in that role, but the first woman to hold office in any Canadian natural history association. Cassels held this post up to 1922, and debated with fellow naturalist, the president Dr. Henry George and supported The Canadian Field-Naturalist. Cassels' time with Charles Snell, next president was congenial.

Cassels helped practical developments like purple martin colonies at Sylvan Lake, although attempts were made to have the Red Deer River Canyon designated as a provincial park in 1906, this was not supported. Cassels's leadership and role as game officer for the Canada Bird Protection Society at Gaetz Lakes, formerly known as the Red Deer Bird Sanctuary, allowed it to eventually be designated as a Dominion Wildlife Refuge in 1924, but required constant vigilance.

Cassels wrote eloquently about her love of nature, refusing to clear a wasps nest, studying its construction and respecting all living things. Cassels observations were like this in Red Deer Advocate, 15 July 1921:

'I know of no prettier sight than a flock of Redwings flying back and forth over their nesting grounds, in the morning sunlight, trilling their lovely call note, and spreading their scarlet wings to show the gorgeous scarlet and cream-edged shoulder patch as they hover over the nest.'

in 1925, William Rowan visited the Cassels' Sylvan Lake home, Ark, and discussed ornithology, went canoeing on the lake and rambling. He sent also sent his research and draft articles for Cassels' scrutiny on different species.

== Death and legacy ==
Cassels died of a stroke on 12 November 1938, at the Red Deer Municipal Hospital. At her death, her husband destroyed all her field notebooks and diaries. Cassels had taken part in an amateur comic play called 'Lady Jane' created with Cassels as 'bird woman' the main character by Margaret Yule of Saanichton, British Columbia, it is not known if it was performed again however.

Cassels' work is still cited in modern publications such as Bibliography of Alberta Naturalists, from her notes in The Canadian Field-Naturalist, which in her obituary, said that by ' her keen enthusiasm, she stimulated a wide interest in the study of ornithology.
