= James Henry Fleming =

Canadian ornithologist

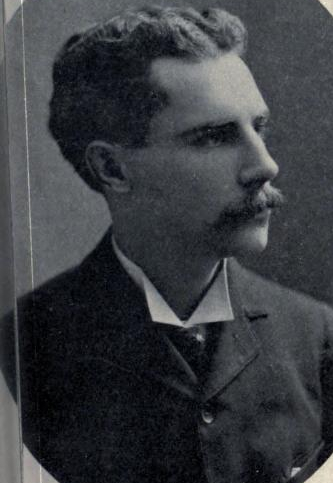
Portrait from Bird Lore (1903)

James Henry Fleming (July 5, 1872, in Toronto – June 27, 1940) was a Canadian ornithologist. Born in a wealthy family he pursued natural history, putting together collections and an extensive library. He served as a curator of the Canada Institute's museum from 1895 to 1897. Fleming also sold specimens across the world to other collectors including Walter Rothschild. He served as an honorary curator of birds at the Royal Ontario Museum from 1927 and bequeathed his personal collections to the museum.

== Life and work ==
Fleming, known at home as Harry, was born in Toronto to seed merchant James and his second wife Mary Elizabeth Wade. His father was Scottish, and sixty years old when his son was born. James grew up in Toronto and spent time in the gardens belonging to his father along with his Newfoundland dog Wallace and became interested in birds at the age of 12. He collected insects at an early age and his earliest bird memories included observing purple martins nesting in birdhouses in the gardens. A visit to the British Museum of Natural History with his father in 1886 influenced the young Harry. Fleming's father ran the horticulture business very successfully and he was a prominent citizen with honorary roles as justice of the peace and alderman. He died in 1887 leaving the family estate of more than $200000 with the land passing on to Harry upon turning twenty five. Fleming went to school at the Toronto Model School followed by Upper Canada College (graduated 1889). He became an associate member of the Royal Canadian Institute at 16. Among his mentors was the Toronto naturalist and dentist William Brodie (1831-1909). He briefly went to study at the Royal School of Mines in London but gave up and returned in 1891, pursuing his ornithological interests. He moved to a new home on Rusholme Road and began to accumulate a library and a collection of birds eggs and skins. On 6th June 1892 he shot a passenger pigeon nearby, the only record of the bird in Toronto. He visited the Caribbean in 1892-93 and contracted malaria. In 1893 he exhibited his bird taxidermy at the Columbian exposition in Chicago. The next year he partnered with a local taxidermist to establish a naturalist specimen business. In 1895 he visited the British Museum and met many of the leading naturalists and ornithologists including Ernst Hartert and Lionel Walter Rothschild. Fleming later sold specimens to Rothschild. In 1916, he became a fellow of the American Ornithologists' Union (AOU), and by 21 was an associate member. He eventually became its president, holding the post from 1932 to 1935.

Fleming was a member of numerous ornithological organizations. In 1905 he was the sole Canadian ornithologist at the London Ornithological Congress. Along with Percy Algernon Taverner and William Edwin Saunders he founded the Great Lakes Ornithological Club in 1906. The organization pioneered bird banding in Canada. The National Museum of Canada made him honorary curator of ornithology in 1913. He was elected British Empire Member of the British Ornithological Union; Corresponding Member of the Zoological Society of London; and Membre d'Honneur Étranger of the Société Ornithologique et Mammalogique de France. He was an honorary member of the Brodie Club, Toronto; an Honorary Member of the Toronto Ornithological Club; Honorary Vice-President of the Toronto Field Naturalists' Club; and in 1927, he was made Honorary Curator of the Royal Ontario Museum of Zoology. Over his life he amassed a vast collection of specimens, numbering over 32,267 skins, and a large ornithological library considered to be one of the largest and most representative private collections at the time. This research collection went to the Royal Ontario Museum upon his death.

Fleming married Christine Mackay Keefer in 1897 and they had a son and a daughter. She died in 1903 and in 1908 he married Caroline Toovey who died just weeks before his own death. The inscription on his gravestone described him as "Ornithologist".
