= Robsonius =

Scientific classification
- Kingdom: Animalia
- Phylum: Chordata
- Class: Aves
- Order: Passeriformes
- Family: Locustellidae
- Genus: Robsonius; Collar, 2006

Type species
- Napothera rabori Rand, 1960

Genus of birds

Robsonius is a genus of passerine birds in the family Locustellidae endemic to the Philippines. The genus was introduced by the English ornithologist Nigel J. Collar in 2006 with the Cordillera ground warbler (Robsonius rabori) as the type species. The name was chosen to honour the British ornithologist Craig R. Robson.

The genus contains the following three species:

Image	Common name	Scientific name	Distribution
	Cordillera ground warbler	Robsonius rabori	Endemic to the Philippines, found in northwest Luzon in the foothills of the Cordillera Mountain Range.
	Sierra Madre ground warbler	Robsonius thompsoni	Endemic to the island of Luzon in the Philippines, found in the northeastern and eastern foothills of the Sierra Madre.
	Bicol ground warbler	Robsonius sorsogonensis	Native to southern Luzon and Catanduanes in the Philippines.
