= Sierra Madre ground warbler =

Conservation status
- Least Concern (IUCN 3.1)

Scientific classification
- Kingdom: Animalia
- Phylum: Chordata
- Class: Aves
- Order: Passeriformes
- Family: Locustellidae
- Genus: Robsonius
- Species: R. thompsoni

Binomial name
- Robsonius thompsoni Hosner, Boggess, Alviola, Sánchez-González, LA, Oliveros, Urriza & Moyle, 2013
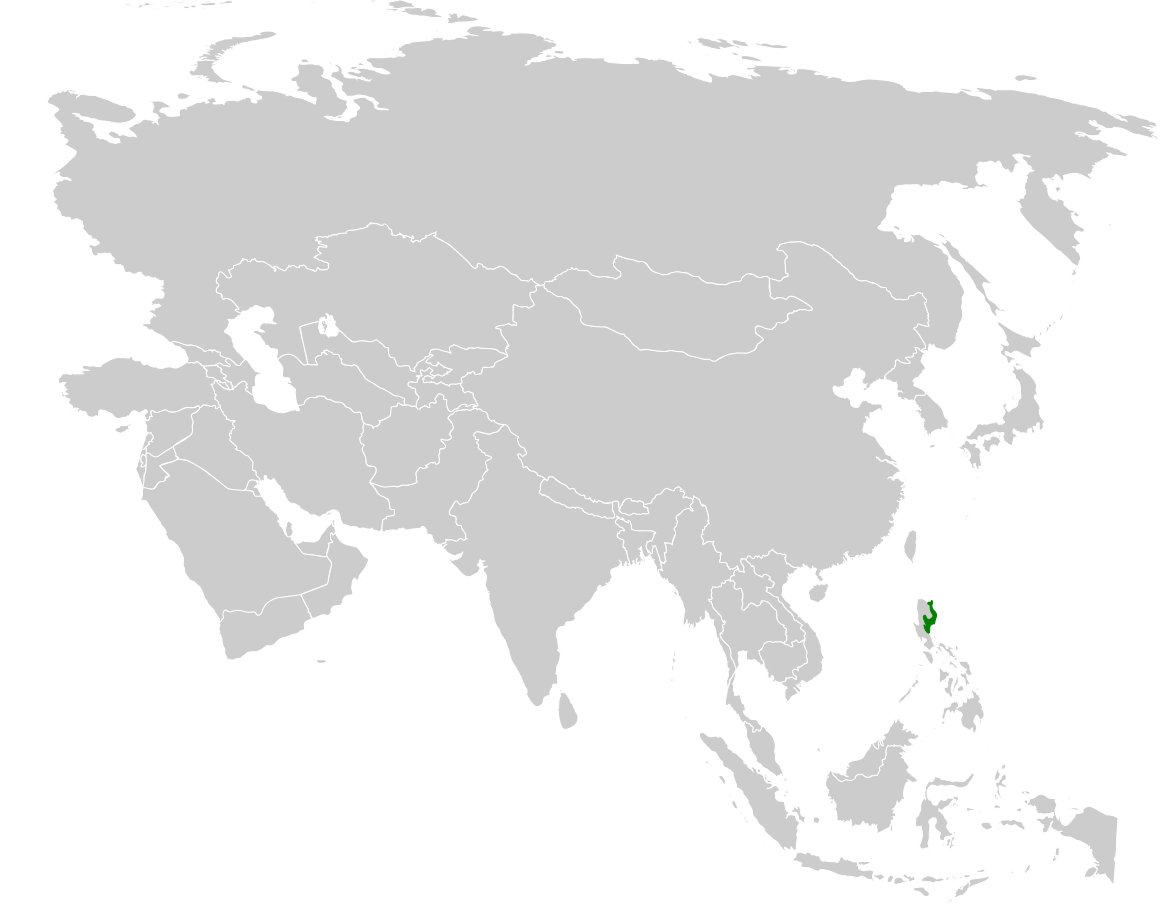

Species of bird

The Sierra Madre ground warbler (Robsonius thompsoni) is a species of passerine bird in the family Locustellidae. It is endemic to the island of Luzon in the Philippines, where it is found in the northeastern and eastern foothills of the Sierra Madre. Its habitat is in tropical moist lowland and the lower reaches of tropical montane forest. It was formerly conspecific and forms a species complex with the Cordillera ground warbler and Bicol ground warbler, which are some of most elusive birds in the country due to their extremely shy nature. While not officially threatened, its population is said to be declining due to habitat destruction through deforestation.

== Description and taxonomy ==
The vocalizations of the Sierra Madre ground warbler are extremely high-pitched. It is difficult to locate the source of the sound in the forest, as they always sound like they are far away even when they are in close proximity.

The three species of ground warblers are similar in size, shape and in the coloration of their juvenile plumage, but they differ from one another in their adult plumage coloration. Due to these close similarities and general lack of information and specimens, these three species were conspecific until scientists conducted molecular studies that proved their validity as separate species. It is differentiated from the Cordillera ground warbler and Bicol ground warbler by its ashy gray chest and the spotted markings on its chin and neck.

The species was first described by the ornithologists Peter Hosner and his colleagues in 2013 and given the binomial name Robsonius thompsoni. The specific epithet was chosen to honour the ornithologist Max C. Thompson. This species is placed in the genus Robsonius that was introduced by the English ornithologist Nigel J. Collar in 2006.

== Behaviour and ecology ==
The Sierra Madre ground warbler is a rotund ground-walking songbird with strong legs and weak wings.

=== Food and feeding ===
Based on the stomach contents of a collected specimen, the diet of the Sierra Madre ground warbler is primarily invertebrates, being seen scouring forest floors for prey hidden under leaves. While foraging it is known to cock its tail anywhere from 30 to 60 degrees.

=== Breeding ===
Very little is known about its breeding habits. It breeds from February to August. Its nest is a large dome with a front entrance slightly above the ground. The clutch size is 2, while the eggs are white with red speckles.

== Habitat and conservation status ==
It is found in lowland moist and low montane dipterocarp forest in primary forest, secondary forest and forest edge up to 1,300 m. It is typically found on the forest floor among limestone outcrops, bamboo and mossy rocks.

The IUCN has assessed this bird as a Least-concern species. The global population size has not been quantified, although it has been described as uncommon. However, it may be more common than suggested by field observations, owing to its secretive habits. Among the other Robsonius ground-warbles, the Sierra Madre ground warbler has the largest range.

Despite not being threatened, the Sierra Madre mountain range has experienced large amounts of deforestation that continues at present and thus results in a declining population. This species' main threat is habitat loss due to wholesale clearance of forest habitats as a result of logging, agricultural conversion and mining activities occurring within the range.

It is found in two protected areas in the Northern Sierra Madre Natural Park and the Aurora Memorial National Park; however, like most areas in the Philippines protection is lax.

Conservation actions proposed include assessing the population size and establishing a monitoring programme to quantify trends; establishing its ability to persist in degraded habitats; identifying and assessing threats; and ensuring that the Northern Sierra Madre Natural Park and the Aurora Memorial National Park are more effectively protected.
