= William Brodie (naturalist) =

Canadian dentist, naturalist and entomologist (1813–1909)

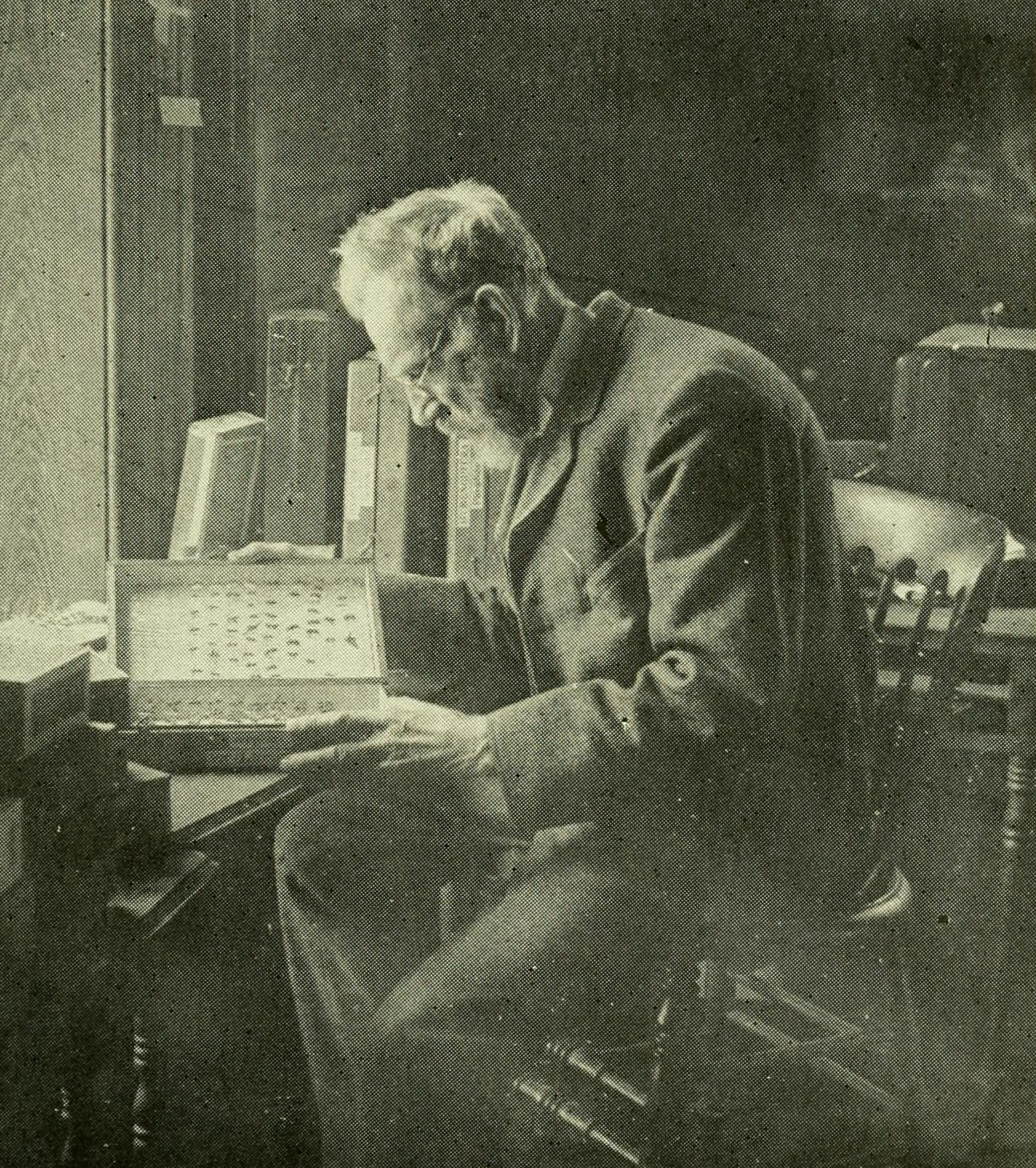
Photograph from the Annual report of the Entomological Society of Ontario, 1909

William Brodie (1831 – 6 August 1909) was a Toronto dentist, pioneering Canadian naturalist, and entomologist. Brodie influenced many naturalists in North America and was involved in establishing the Toronto Entomological Society in 1877 which became in 1878 the Natural History Society of Toronto. In 1885 it became part of the Canadian Institute. He was especially known for his study of plant galls of which he made a large reference collection and described several gall-making insect species. The Brodie Club was established in his memory in 1921.

== Life and work ==
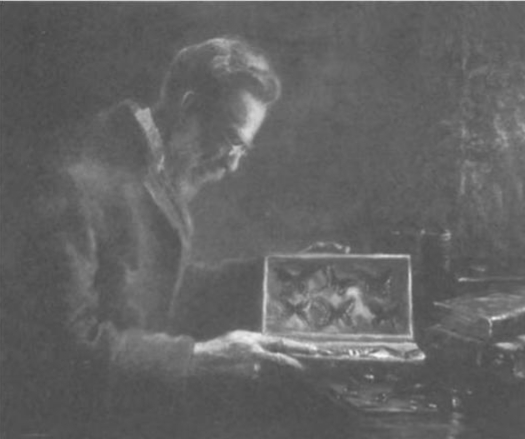
Portrait of Dr. Brodie by Owen Staples (1866-1949) in 1914 for the Royal Ontario Museum

Brodie was born in Peterhead, Scotland to George and Jean Milne. He was baptized on July 9, 1831. The family moved to Canada when he was four and settled in a farm near Gormley in Whitchurch Township. Brodie grew up with an interest in the natural world nurtured by his mother and went to local schools before teaching in Whitchurch and Markham. One of the earliest students of the Dental College in Toronto, he qualified as a dentist in 1870 after passing the exams of the Royal College of Dental Surgeons and practiced in Markham before moving to Toronto. He was among the first in Toronto to adopt the use of chloroform anesthesia in his practice. He spent his free time collecting and studying insects and natural history. He was known for his scientific approach to observing and deducing facts from nature although he was sceptical of Darwin's idea of natural selection which he considered as a "tautology". He was noted for his story-telling and infectious enthusiasm influencing several naturalists including Ernest Thompson Seton, Francis J.A. Morris (1869-1949), Alice Hollingworth, the artist Tom Thomson (who was the son of a cousin), James Alexander Munro, and James Henry Fleming. He found the entomological society of Ontario to be a "mere" social club and began a Toronto Entomological Society in 1877 which he renamed as the Natural History Society of Toronto in 1878. The organization merged with the Canadian Institute in 1885.

Brodie married Jane Anna McPherson of Whitby and they had a son and six daughters. Their son, William Brodie junior known as "Sweet William", who was also a keen naturalist became a close friend of E. T. Seton. He died in a canoe accident on the Assiniboine River in 1883. Brodie was a Presbyterian and a follower of the liberal party. He served as the first president of the Toronto Reform Association. Brodie's collections of 18,000 plant galls was sold to the Smithsonian Institution in 1903. It also included specimens of the insects that were reared from the galls. The collection occupied 22 drawers and had a number referring to field notes (which, until 1922, was thought to be lost but was found and borrowed from his daughter Jessie Brodie to copy data on the locality and emergence dates). Some of the other material went to the Provincial Museum in Ontario for a token price of $1000. The museum appointed him as a provincial biologist and curator. He supported biological control of pests and was against the use of toxic chemicals. He worked there, advising farmers on pests until his death from pneumonia. Francis J. A. Morris, classics master at Trinity College, wrote a poem titled "A Master Mind" in his memory.
