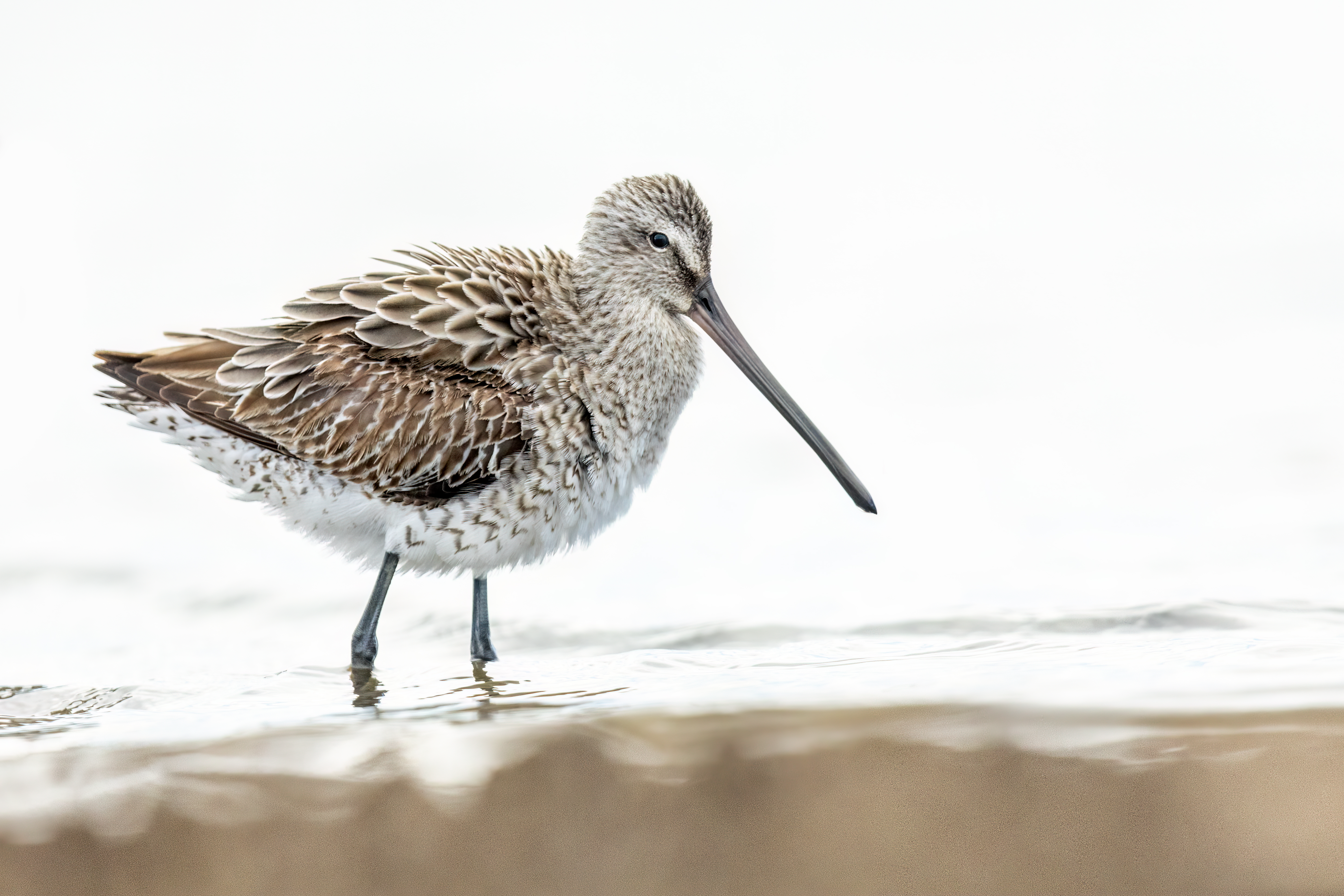
- in winter plumage

Conservation status
- Near Threatened (IUCN 3.1)

Scientific classification
- Kingdom: Animalia
- Phylum: Chordata
- Class: Aves
- Order: Charadriiformes
- Family: Scolopacidae
- Genus: Limnodromus
- Species: L. semipalmatus

Binomial name
- Limnodromus semipalmatus (Blyth, 1848)

Synonyms
- Macrorhamphus semipalmatus Blyth, 1848

= Asian dowitcher =

Species of bird

Video at Manly Marina, South East Queensland

The Asian dowitcher (Limnodromus semipalmatus) is a medium-large wader in the Scolopacidae family of sandpipers.

== Description ==
Adults have dark legs and a long, straight dark bill, somewhat shorter than that of the long-billed dowitcher. The body is brown on top and reddish underneath in breeding plumage. The tail has a black and white barred pattern. The winter plumage is largely grey.

Their breeding habitat is grassy wetlands in inland Siberia and Manchuria. They migrate to southeast Asia as far south as northern Australia, although both the breeding and wintering areas are poorly known. This bird is always found on coasts during migration and wintering.

These birds forage by probing in shallow water or on wet mud. They mainly eat insects, molluscs, crustaceans, and marine worms, but also eat some plant material.

== Similar species ==
This bird can be confused for its confamilial bar-tailed godwit, but can be distinguished by its smaller size, yelping call, and "sewing machine" feeding action typical of dowitchers.
