= Percy A. Taverner =

Canadian architect and ornithologist

Percy Algernon Taverner (June 10, 1875 – May 9, 1947) was a Canadian ornithologist and architect.

== Early life ==
He was born Percy Algernon Fowler in Guelph, Ontario in 1875. When his parents separated and his mother remarried, he took on his new parent's surname, Tavernier, which he later changed to Taverner.

== Career ==
Taverner, a self-taught naturalist, was the first ornithologist at the National Museum of Canada, now the Canadian Museum of Nature, from 1912 to 1942. Taverner was in correspondence with Alberta's first female naturalist and 'keen observer' of birdlife Elsie Cassels. Taverner was one of a handful of federal bureaucrats who convinced the Canadian Government to sign the 1916 Canada-U.S. Migratory Birds Convention. He helped establish Point Pelee National Park and a number of bird sanctuaries across Canada, including Bonaventure Island. As an architect, Taverner designed in Chicago, Detroit and Ottawa, including homes on Rosedale Avenue and Leonard Avenue in Ottawa.

A pillar of the Ottawa naturalist community, he was president of the Ottawa Field Naturalists’ Club in the 1930s and was substantially responsible for the survival of this organization and its journal, The Canadian Field-Naturalist, which he founded.

Taverner was a mentor to Louise de Kiriline Lawrence in her career as an ornithologist, encouraging her work as a bird bander.

He died in Ottawa in 1947 and is buried in Beechwood Cemetery. Taverner is the subject of a biography titled "A Life With Birds: Percy A. Taverner, Canadian Ornithologist".

== Honours ==
The Taverner Cup, a 24-hour competitive birdathon held in eastern Ontario and western Quebec, is named after him. The timberline sparrow (Spizella breweri taverneri), considered to be a subspecies of Brewer's sparrow, and a subspecies of Canada goose (Branta canadensis taverneri) carry the last part in his honour.He named the Fleming's grouse (Dendragapus obscurus flemingi) after Canadian ornithologist James Henry Fleming.

In 2015, in recognition of his contributions, the City of Ottawa named a new park at 130 Woodbine Place “Percy Taverner Park.”

== Partial works ==
- Birds of Eastern Canada (1919)
- Birds of Western Canada (1926)
- Birds of Canada (1934)

== Archives ==
There is a Percy A. Taverner fonds at the Canadian Museum of Nature Library and Archives.
