= William Rowan (biologist) =

Canadian biologist and ornithologist

FRSC William Rowan
- Born: July 29, 1891; Basel, Switzerland
- Died: June 30, 1957 (aged 65); Edmonton, Canada
- Education: Bedford School
- Alma mater: University College London
- Scientific career
- Fields: Biology; ornithology

William Rowan FRSC (1891–1957), was a Canadian biologist and ornithologist best known as a founder of photobiology for establishing the link between the length of daylight and bird migration. Rowan was recognized for his findings with the Flavelle Medal in 1946. In 1993, Marianne Gosztonyi Ainley wrote Restless Energy: A Biography of William Rowan, 1891–1957 detailing his life.

== Biography ==
William Rowan was born in Basel, Switzerland on 29 July 1891. In 1908, he emigrated to Canada and spent three years working as a ranch hand, sketching and photographing wildlife in his spare time, before returning to England and enrolling at University College London.

In 1914, Rowan's studies were briefly interrupted by the outbreak of the First World War.He briefly joined the London Scottish Rifles, but saw no active service and was discharged on medical grounds in 1915. He graduated in 1917 and after further study gained an MSc in 1919. After a brief spell as a school teacher in England, he was appointed as a lecturer in Zoology at the University of Manitoba in 1919, where he was a founder member of the Natural History Society of Manitoba. He moved to Edmonton in 1920 to found the department of Zoology at the University of Alberta, heading the department until his retirement in 1956.

In addition to being a renowned biologist, Rowan was also known for his love of the arts. He was a self-taught pianist. In addition, he was skilled in the visual arts, especially sculpting, pencil sketching, and photography. His photographic works were featured at the Royal Photographic Society in London.

Rowan died in Edmonton on 30 June 1957.

== Bird Migration Experiment ==
In 1924, Rowan began experimenting with the effects of daylight on bird migration. It was generally thought that migration was probably initiated by variations in temperature or barometric pressure. He trapped a number of dark-eyed juncos, which he kept caged, and lengthened the hours of daylight to which they were exposed. This produced spring behaviour in the birds during the middle of winter. This work earned Rowan a doctorate from University College London, but a direct link to migration remained to be established: the seasonally disturbed birds appeared ready to fly northwards in spite of the fact that it was still winter; however, it remained to be established where they went after their release.

Rowan then carried out the now-legendary experiment that established his reputation. In the autumn of 1931, 500 crows were confined in cages on the south bank of the North Saskatchewan River. The crows were divided into two equally sized groups: an experimental group subjected to artificial light that gradually shortened their nights; and a control group, which experienced natural seasonal reductions in daylight hours.

Rowan released the crows in November, after their tails were dyed yellow for purposes of identification. Their release was accompanied by a radio and press campaign offering rewards for every yellow-tailed crow caught or shot. As a result, Rowan was able to account for more than half of the birds. More crows from the control group were accounted for, as they tended either to remain near to the site of their release or to fly south; those from the experimental group behaved as they would in spring, flying north.

This identification of the cause of migratory behaviour provided Rowan with international standing as a scientist. Rowan had a long standing correspondence on observations with Elsie Cassels, one of the first female ornithologists in Canada, whose advice and observations he respected.

== Accomplishments ==
- Recipient of Flavelle Medal (1946)
- Fellow of the Royal Society of Canada (1934)
- Fellow of the Zoological Society of London
- Fellow of the American Ornithologists Union (1950)
- Member of British Ornithological Union

== Publications ==
- On Photoperiodism, Reproductive Periodicity, and the Animal Migrations of Birds and Certain Fishes (1926)
- Riddle of Migration (1931)
