= Austin L. Rand =

Canadian zoologist (1905–1982)

- Born: 16 December 1905; Kentville, Nova Scotia
- Died: 6 November 1982 (aged 76); Avon Park, Florida
- Education: Acadia University, Cornell University
- Known for: Many books, from The distribution and habits of Madagascar birds (1936) to Birds of North America (1971)
- Children: Austin Stanley Rand (son)
- Scientific career
- Fields: Zoology, especially ornithology
- Institutions: National Museum of Canada, now the Canadian Museum of Nature
- Author abbrev. (zoology): Rand

Austin Loomer Rand (16 December 1905 – 6 November 1982) was a Canadian zoologist.

He was born in Kentville, Nova Scotia in 1905 and grew up in nearby Wolfville, where he was mentored by the noted local ornithologist Robie W. Tufts. He received a Bachelor of Science from Acadia University, an institution which also awarded him an honorary DSc degree in 1961.

In 1929, while still a graduate student at Cornell University, he travelled on an expedition to Madagascar as collector of birds. Rand published the results as his thesis for his PhD It was on this expedition that he met Richard Archbold, zoologist and philanthropist, with whom he became a lifelong friend. Archbold subsequently financed and led a series of biological expeditions to New Guinea in the 1930s in which Rand participated and co-led. In 1941 he assisted Archbold in the establishment of the Archbold Biological Station at Lake Placid, Florida, a place he retired to.

In 1942, Rand became assistant zoologist at the National Museum of Canada, now the Canadian Museum of Nature, where he worked with ornithologist Percy A. Taverner and mammalogist Rudolph Martin Anderson. From 1947 to 1955, he was curator of birds at the Field Museum in Chicago and was chief Curator of Zoology there from 1955 to 1970.

He was a frequent contributor to The Auk, the ornithological journal of the American Ornithologists' Union, an organisation of which he was elected a Fellow as well as serving as its President in 1962–1964.

In 1996 he was commemorated in the name of one of the research buildings at the Archbold Biological Station.

Austin L. Rand was father of the noted tropical herpetologist Austin Stanley Rand of the Smithsonian.

== Publications ==
As well as numerous articles and scientific papers, major reports and books authored or coauthored by Rand include:

- 1936. The distribution and habits of Madagascar birds. (Bulletin of the American Museum of Natural History).
- 1937. Results of the Archbold expeditions No.14: The birds of the 1933–1934 Papuan expedition. (Bulletin of the American Museum of Natural History. Coauthored with Ernst Mayr).
- 1942. Results of the Archbold Expeditions. Birds of the 1936–1937 New Guinea Expedition. (Bulletin of the American Museum of Natural History).
- 1955. Stray feathers from a bird man's desk. Fascinating and unusual sidelights on the lives of birds.
- 1956. American Water and Game Birds.
- 1960. Birds of the Philippine Islands: Siquijor, Mount Malidang, Bohol, and Samar. (Fieldiana. Coauthored with D.S. Rabor).
- 1961. A Midwestern Almanac, Pageant of the Seasons. (Coauthored with his wife Rheua M. Rand).
- 1962. Birds in Summer.
- 1967. Ornithology: an Introduction.
- 1967. Handbook of New Guinea Birds. (Coauthored with E. Thomas Gilliard).
- 1971. Birds of North America.
