= Richard E. Prince =

Canadian sculptor (born 1949)

- Born: Richard Edmund Prince; April 6, 1949 (age 77); Comox, British Columbia, Canada
- Education: University of British Columbia (B. A)
- Years active: 1973–present

Richard Edmund Prince (born April 6, 1949) is a Canadian sculptor and teacher.

== Biography ==
Prince was born on April 6, 1949 in Comox, British Columbia, but he lived in Vancouver growing up. He graduated from the University of British Columbia with a Bachelor of Arts in 1971, and began teaching sculpture in 1973. He also began sculpting at that time. Prince's art has been displayed in art galleries such as the Vancouver Art Gallery in 1972. Prince currently teaches as a professor in sculpting.
