= Turenne (disambiguation) =

Turenne (1611–1675) was the French military leader Henri de la Tour d'Auvergne, Vicomte de Turenne.

Turenne also may refer to:

- Turenne, Corrèze, French town
  - Château de Turenne, French castle
  - Viscounty of Turenne, French noble title
- Turenne, former name of Sabra, Algeria
- Turenne (name), surname
