= Turenne (name) =

Turenne is both a surname, and the seat of various titles of nobility, which therefore end with "de Turenne".

Those bearing the surname or such a title include:

- Marie (or Marguerite) de Turenne, a.k.a. Maria de Ventadorn (fl. c. 1200), French poet and collector
- Claudine de la Tour-Turenne (1520–1591), French Countess
- Henri de La Tour d'Auvergne, Duke of Bouillon (1555–1623), French military leader and politician
- Henri de la Tour d'Auvergne, Vicomte de Turenne (1611–1675), French military leader
- Armand de Turenne (1891–1980), French air soldier
- Henri de Turenne (1921–2016), French writer
- Louis Turenne (1933–2006), Canadian actor
- Darcy Turenne (born 1984), Canadian bicyclist
- Woodny Turenne (born 1987), American football player

== See also ==
- Raoul of Turenne (fl. 840 to 866), French religious leader
- Viscounts of Turenne and princes of Sedan in junior line of House of La Tour d'Auvergne
