= Mount Washington Alpine Resort =

Ski hill in British Columbia, Canada

- Interactive map of Mount Washington Alpine Resort
- Location: Vancouver Island, Canada
- Nearest city: Courtenay, Comox
- Coordinates: 49°44′18″N 125°17′55″W
- Opened: 1979
- Vertical: 507 metres (1,663 ft)
- Top elevation: 1,590 m (5,216 ft)
- Base elevation: 1,083 m (3,558 ft)
- Trails: 82
- Longest run: Linton's Loop
- Lift system: 5 chair lifts 5 magic carpets
- Terrain parks: 2
- Snowfall: avg. 9 m (29.5276 ft)/year
- Website: www.mountwashington.ca

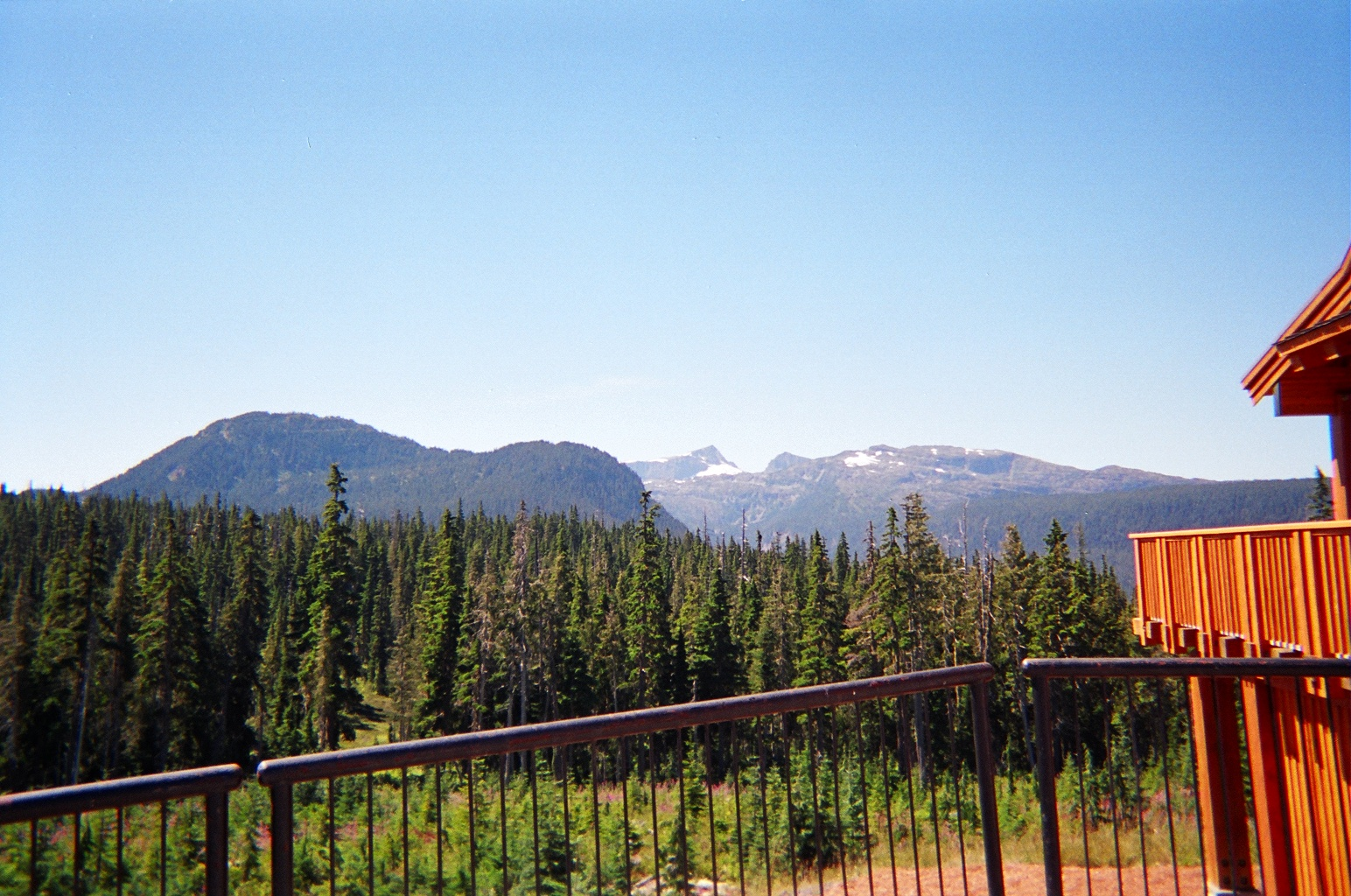
View from Mount Washington Nordic Lodge

Mount Washington Alpine Resort is a year-round recreation destination located on Vancouver Island, British Columbia, Canada.

== History ==
Mt. Washington Alpine Resort was established in 1979 by Henry Norie and Alex Linton, two Campbell River businessmen. The idea originated in 1975 when Linton was impressed by Mt. Washington's height and snowpack. Together with Norie, they surveyed the mountain. After 16 months, they acquired the land from Crown Zellerbach, a forestry company, and enlisted Ecosign, a mountain resort planning company, to develop the resort. Construction commenced in 1977, making Mt. Washington one of the first master-planned resorts in British Columbia, similar to Whistler Blackcomb.

In 1989, George Stuart and a group of shareholders purchased the founders' interests and invested in upgrades for the resort, including lifts, terrain, base area buildings, and infrastructure. In 2015, Stuart's group sold the resort and a significant portion of the developable land near the base area to a Canadian subsidiary of Pacific Group Resorts, Inc.

== Transportation ==
- The resort is located at #1 Strathcona Parkway, Mt. Washington, BC, approximately a 15-minute drive from the Inland Island Highway, British Columbia Highway 19. Various bus services connect to Courtenay, and during the winter season, the resort operates a ski bus shuttle service with stops in Courtenay.
- BC Ferries offers daily ferry connections from Vancouver to Nanaimo, as well as from Powell River to Comox.
- The Comox Valley Airport (YQQ) and Campbell River Airport (YBL) on Vancouver Island are the closest to Mt. Washington, approximately a 40-minute drive from either.
