= Andrew Hallam =

Canadian personal finance author

- Writing career
- Notable works: Millionaire Teacher, Balance
- Website: andrewhallam.com

Andrew Hallam is a personal finance author and speaker from Canada. He was formerly a middle school teacher in Comox, British Columbia.

Hallam's book Millionaire Teacher (Wiley 2011, 2017) is about becoming a millionaire on a teacher's salary. He also wrote The Global Expatriate’s Guide To Investing (Wiley 2014) and Millionaire Expat (Wiley 2018).
