= Hamilton Mack Laing =

Canadian naturalist and ornithologist

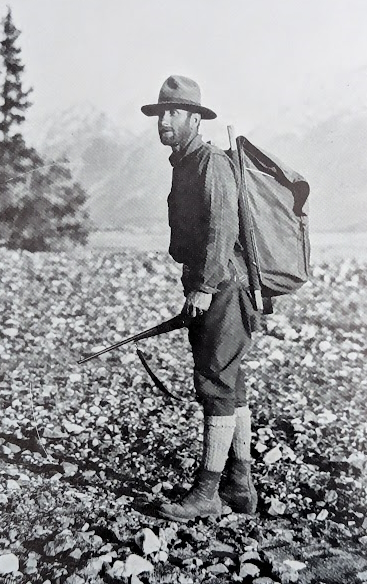
- Beside the Chitina River during the Mount Logan Expedition, May 1925
- Born: February 6, 1883; Hensall, Ontario, Canada
- Died: February 15, 1982 (aged 99); Comox, British Columbia, Canada
- Other name: Mack Laing
- Occupations: Naturalist, ornithologist, author
- Notable work: Out with the Birds; Allan Brooks: Artist Naturalist; Riding the Continent

David Hamilton Mack Laing (6 Feb 1883 – 15 Feb 1982), known for most of his life as "Mack Laing", was a naturalist, writer, ornithologist, artist, photographer, taxidermist and hunter who greatly increased the knowledge of Western Canadian flora and fauna in the early years of the twentieth century. He was a prolific writer about nature; about 900 of his stories appeared in popular magazines of the time. Many of his mounted bird and animal skins, collected during scientific expeditions, are in the collections of museums and universities around the world.

== Early life and education ==
Laing's parents, William Oswald Laing and Rachel Melvina Mack, met in Ontario and wed in 1874, then moved west to the pioneer township of Clearsprings, Manitoba (near Steinbach) to clear bushland and start a farm. When Rachel became pregnant in 1882, they temporarily returned to Hensall, Ontario to be with her parents. That is where Hamilton Mack Laing was born in February 1883. Shortly after his birth, his parents moved back to Clearsprings, and Laing was raised on their farm.

Early in life, Laing showed a strong interest in birds. He also displayed talent in sketching and painting. The young boy was given the responsibility of trapping "bad" animals, pests and predators that threatened the farm's domestic stock. By age 10, Laing was bartering mink and weasel pelts at the local general store for school supplies. At age 11, Laing was shown how to shoot a rifle and added crows, hawks and other carnivorous birds to his list of "bad" animals.

After graduating from a local middle school, Laing moved to Winnipeg at the age of 15 to attend Winnipeg Collegiate Institute. Upon graduating in 1900, Laing took four months to earn a teacher's diploma.

== Teacher and principal ==
Laing taught in various small schools for four years. During this time, Laing began to keep a daily diary of the wildlife he saw, particularly birds, a habit he would keep for the rest of his life. He also took a correspondence course in story writing, and wrote his first published story, "The End of the Trail", which appeared in My Tribune Sunday Magazine on 24 March 1907. This was the first of over 900 stories that would be published over the next seventy years.

Laing became an art teacher for a year before becoming a high school principal in 1908, a post he would hold for 3 years. The Boy Scout movement arrived in Canada in 1908, and Laing started one of the first troops in Canada. His future as an educator seemed assured. But Laing nurtured a secret dream to become a writer-naturalist.

== Traveller, artist and writer ==
Before colour photography, naturalists were expected to paint accurate pictures of birds. At the end of the 1911 school year, at the age of 28, Laing abruptly resigned his post as principal and moved to Brooklyn, New York to enrol as an art student at the Pratt Institute. He also learned photography, and started to use his photographs to illustrate the nature stories he was selling to large circulation magazines.

While still studying art, Laing published his first book in 1913, Out with the Birds, describing the birds of Manitoba. The book was well received, and prominent scientific journal The Auk commented, "Laing seems not only to know his birds but to know how to tell us about them, and as we turn the pages of his book we share with him the enthusiasm of the nature lover and the excitement of the bird photographer."

Upon graduating from Pratt in the spring of 1914, Laing used the money he had earned from his published stories to buy himself a 1914 Harley-Davidson motorcycle. Assuming he was going to resume his teaching career again, Laing spent the summer of 1914 riding his motorcycle from Brooklyn to Winnipeg, where he applied to be an art teacher. However, a global war had broken out in Europe that had swept up Canada, and no teachers were being hired. Laing travelled back to New York by train, where he settled down for the winter to write more of his popular nature stories.

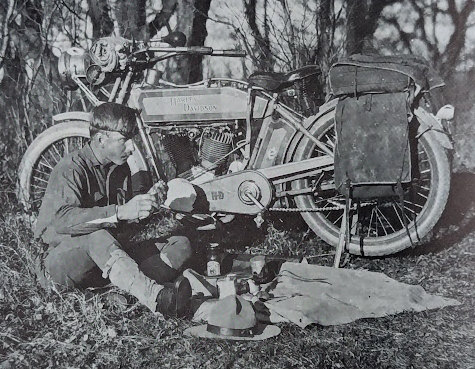
On the road with "Barking Betsy", 1915

While in New York, he met Francis Harper, who had just returned from an ornithological expedition to Lake Athabasca in northern Canada, and was organizing a return expedition that he hoped would be sponsored by the Smithsonian Institution. Harper was an admirer of Laing's stories and asked Laing to be a part of his expedition. However, Harper was having trouble with funding, and when the project seemed to be indefinitely stalled, Laing bought another Harley-Davidson motorcycle, which he nicknamed "Barking Betsy". Laing rode "Barking Betsy" back to Winnipeg in the summer of 1915. With his younger brother Jim outfitted on Laing's older motorcycle, the two rode from Winnipeg to San Francisco, a feat of endurance given the lack of paved roads at the time. Laing's parents, William and Rachel, had retired first to Winnipeg and then to Portland, Oregon. Laing and his brother decided to visit them and rode north to Portland.

When Laing arrived at his parents' home, the first person he met was 19-year-old Ethel May Hart, who was baby-sitting his sister's children. Laing moved into a room in his parents' house, and took up writing full-time, submitting his stories to popular magazines of the time such as Recreation, Outdoor Life, Canadian Magazine, Sunset: The Pacific Monthly, Tall Timber, Country Life in America, St. Nicholas Magazine, and Scientific American. Laing also wrote a book about his adventures riding across North America on "Barking Betsy", and titled his manuscript The Transcontinentalist. However, he did not submit it for publication.

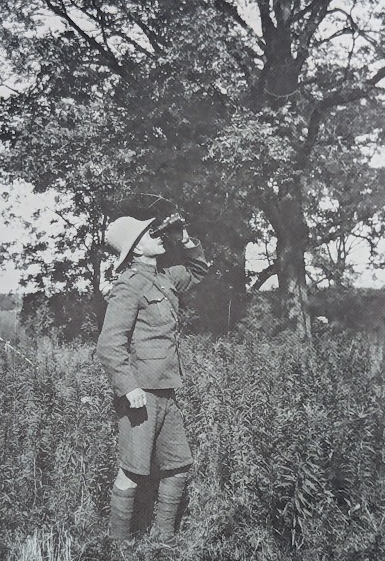
Laing in uniform of RFC instructor near his Beamsville observation tower, 1918

The United States entered World War I in 1917. Laing decided to enlist, but rather than joining an American unit, he travelled back east to sign up with the British Royal Flying Corps, which maintained an enlistment centre in New York City. Laing was transferred to Toronto for flight training, but at age 34, was considered too old for combat operations. Instead, after his training, Laing was transferred to the flight school at Beamsville, Ontario as a machine gun instructor. This involved standing in an observation tower for many hours as his students flew above him, and Laing spent time between student flights observing birds around him. During this time, Laing also met prominent ornithologists in the Toronto area, including Hoyes Lloyd (who would go on to become the president of the American Ornithologists' Union), James Henry Fleming (also to become president of the AOU), and Percy Taverner, who had just succeeded in convincing the Canadian Government to sign the 1916 Canada-U.S. Migratory Bird Convention. Fleming introduced him to a contact at The Globe, and from 1918 to 1924, Laing's articles appeared regularly in the Toronto newspaper, and through syndication, across Canada. Laing's first scientific paper, "Lake Shore Bird Migration at Beamsville, Ontario", appeared in The Canadian Field-Naturalist in February 1920.

== Collector and naturalist ==
After the war, Laing returned to his parents' Portland house and planned to return to writing full-time. But during the second decade of the 20th century, there was an enormous demand by museums and universities for specimens of birds, and Laing, who was a crack shot, started to fill orders for specific birds found around Portland.

In 1920, Francis Harper's long-delayed expedition to Lake Athabasca via canoe finally came together. Laing served as Harper's assistant, cataloguing over 500 birds and plants, and taking many photographs of wildlife. However, Harper had a major rift with the U.S. Biological Survey, sponsors of the expedition, and the official report of the expedition was never published.

Laing gathered some of his short stories into a book, which was published in 1921 as Wildfowling Tales, from the Great Ducking Resorts of the Continent. That summer, Laing returned to the field as an assistant to Percy Taverner on an expedition to Cypress Lake, Saskatchewan.

In May 1922, Laing accompanied a one-month field expedition sponsored by the Victoria Memorial Museum to the South Okanagan Valley. There he met Allan Brooks, at the time the foremost bird illustrator in North America, and the two became close friends. At the end of the expedition, Brooks insisted that Laing come with him to his home in Comox, British Columbia, telling Laing that the small fishing village was "a very birdy place" and Laing "wouldn't find a better spot in which to work on his coastal [bird] collection." When Laing arrived, he found himself so enamoured with the area that he bought a forested 5-acre (2-hectare) oceanfront lot divided by a meadering stream called Brooklyn Creek.

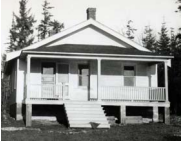
Baybrook, 1924

Laing ordered a house kit from Aladdin Readi-Cut Houses and started to clear part of his property for the house. During 1923, he refused all collecting work as he completed the house, which he called Baybrook, and built a bridge across Brooklyn Creek.

In 1924, the British aviator Archibald Stuart-MacLaren was attempting the first aerial circumnavigation of the globe. The Canadian government agreed to send a cache of fuel to Tokyo on HMCS Thiepval, and Laing was hired to be the naturalist on board as the ship travelled up the coasts of Canada, Alaska, and Russia before arriving in Japan. Laing wrote an official report of his observations of wildflife for the National Museum of Canada.

=== Mount Logan Expedition ===
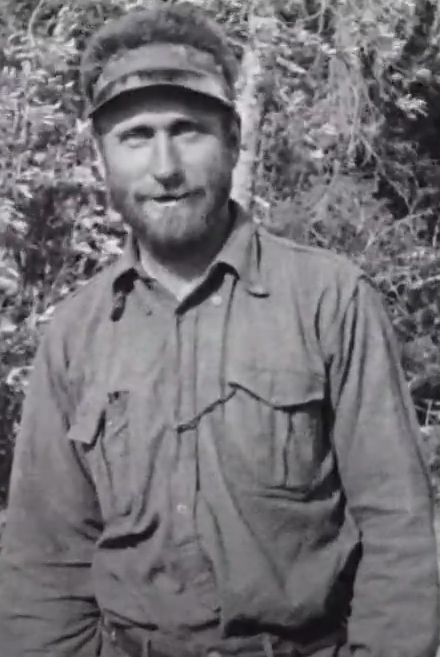
Member of the Mount Logan Expedition (Still frame from the documentary "The Conquest of Mount Logan")

For the summer of 1925, Laing had originally expected to go on an expedition to Alberta. But the Canadian geologist Arthur Philemon Coleman had proposed to the Alpine Club of Canada that an expedition be sent to climb Mount Logan, the highest peak in Canada, and the National Museum of Canada had recommended that Laing accompany the expedition. As Arthur Oliver Wheeler, president of the Alpine Club of Canada, explained to him, Laing would not only be the expedition's naturalist, but also one of two photographer/cinematographers, since plans were being made to produce a documentary movie about the expedition. Laing wouldn't be expected to climb the mountain. Instead, he would stay at a camp below the treeline and collect specimens of birds, mammals and plants for the National Museum of Canada while the climbers were summiting the mountain. After learning this, Laing described himself as "the tail of the kite."

Laing's first step was to travel to Seattle in April 1925, where the expedition was being outfitted, to learn how use a motion picture camera. On 2 May 1925 the expedition left Seattle by ship and sailed to Cordova, Alaska, where they took a train to Chitina and then to McCarthy, Alaska. During this time, Laing took several opportunities to shoot film of the various stages of travel. The expedition then transferred their equipment to pack animals and walked up the Chitina River Valley to a place called Lubrick's Camp, where Laing would be based. Laing accompanied the climbers to the end of the trail, again shooting some film of them. On May 18 the climbers departed for the mountain, and Laing headed back to Lubrick's Camp. For the next seven weeks, Laing was on his own as he collected and preserved specimens and made observations about the behaviour of wildlife in the area.

On July 6 the climbers arrived back in camp, having summited Mount Logan on June 25. Several climbers had suffered severely frostbitten feet, so the expedition decided to raft down the Chitina River to McCarthy rather than walk. Laing, who again was being left behind, shot film of the rafts floating away. After their departure, Laing was on his own for another six weeks. On August 15, a pack train arrived to take expedition equipment and Laing's specimens to McCarthy. Laing had collected 245 plants, 203 bird skins and 61 mammal skins, which took three horses to pack out. When his specimens arrived at the National Museum of Canada, one of the plants, a subspecies of Antennaria rosea (rosy pussytoes) was discovered to be previously undocumented, and was named Antennaria laingii in honour of Laing's discovery.

A 43-minute silent documentary about the expedition, The Conquest of Mount Logan, was produced, and 500–600 feet of Laing's filming as well as several of his photographs of wildlife were featured in the movie.

== Marriage and nut farming ==
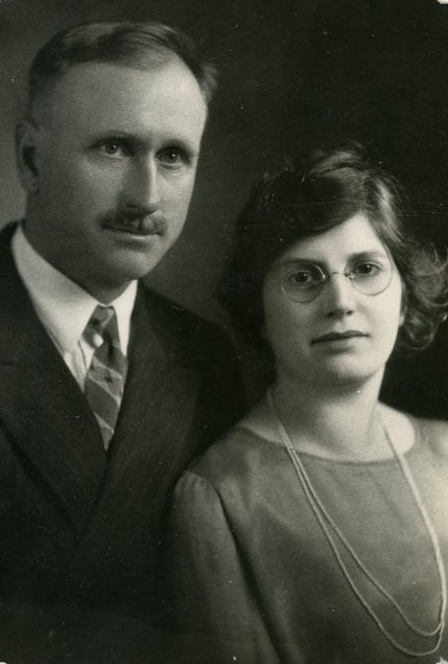
Wedding photo of Mack and Ethel, 1927

Over the preceding decade, Laing had stayed in correspondence with Ethel May Hart, the young woman he had met in Portland. In addition to their romantic interest in each other, the two both enjoyed hunting, fishing, and camping. In 1927, the two were wed in Portland and Ethel moved to Laing's house, Baybrook. As friend Percy Taverner wrote in a letter to Laing, " A typing, bird-skinning, camping and good cooking wife is a pearl without price — are there any more at home like her? I am interested."

For a few more years after he married, Laing spent his summers on scientific expeditions in British Columbia, but in 1930, he decided to settle down, and became a guide-naturalist working in Jasper and Banff. However, his guide contract unexpectedly was not renewed in 1931 due to the Great Depression. Laing stayed in Comox, and he and Ethel instead bought more property and planted six acres (2.4 hectares) with nut and fruit trees, which included walnut, pecan, filbert, hazelnut, apple and plum trees, as well as extensive fruit and vegetable gardens. This proved to be profitable, and Laing supplemented their income with freelance bird collecting.

Although Laing went on several more scientific expeditions — to Cape Scott, British Columbia in 1935, and on faunal surveys of the British Columbia coast in the summers of 1936–1939 — in 1940, at the age of 57, he decided to retire from collecting.

== Later life and death ==
Laing and Ethel enjoyed working on their Baybrook farm together but in 1944, Ethel unexpectedly died of cancer. Laing tried to carry on but found it difficult to run the nut farm on his own. In 1949, Laing sold the ten acres (4.0 hectares) containing Baybrook and the nut farm, and at the age of 67, he built himself another house on the remaining five acres (2.0 hectares) of his property, naming it Shakesides.

Allan Brooks, the wildlife artist, had died in 1946, and Laing spent several years collating Brooks's papers and writing a biography. However, he could not find a publisher for the book.

Although Laing would become a strong supporter for environmentalism, especially the issue of spills and discharges into the waters around Comox and their effect on the local seabird population, Laing found himself increasingly disagreeing with a new generation of conservationists. Laing had been brought up to believe that songbirds and waterfowl needed human protection from predators, which was at odds with the more modern doctrine that nature should be allowed to come to an equilibrium between predators and prey without intervention from humans.

In 1971, at age 87, Laing received a certificate sent jointly from John Robert Nicholson, the Lieutenant-Governor of British Columbia, and W.A.C. Bennett, provincial premier, naming him as a "British Columbia Centennial Pioneer", and extending thanks to Laing for his "contributions to Canada and British Columbia."

In 1980, Laing was the recipient of the Cliff Shaw Memorial Award from the Saskatchewan Natural History Society (now Nature Saskatchewan) for his contributions to the understanding of the province's flora and fauna.

In 1979, when Laing was 96, his biography of Allan Brooks titled Allan Brooks: Artist Naturalist was finally published by the British Columbia Provincial Museum.

Laing died shortly after his 99th birthday.

== Legacy ==
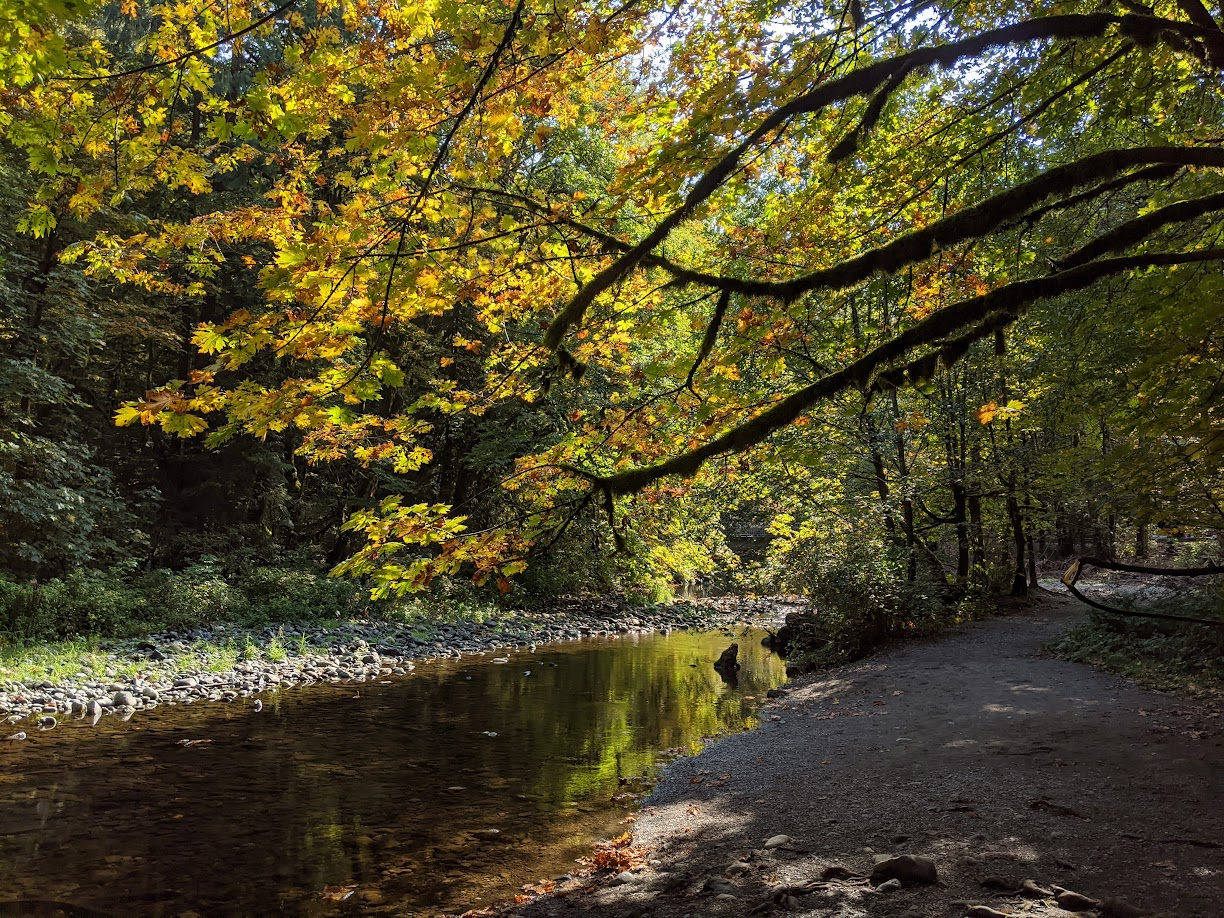
Brooklyn Creek flows beside trail in Mack Laing Nature Park

During his life, Laing collected 10,000 birds, mammals and plants, which are now owned by museums and universities around the world. He published two dozen scientific papers for major ornithological journals and wrote over 900 popular articles that appeared in newspapers and popular large circulation magazines. Two birds, two mammals and one plant were named for him, including telnatodytes palustris laingi (a subspecies of long-billed wren discovered on the 1920 scientific expedition to Lake Athabaska); Laing's white-footed mouse; perognathus laingi (a subspecies of anarchist mountain pocket mouse); and Antennaria laingii (a subspecies of rosy pussytoes discovered during the 1925 Mount Logan expedition).

Laing left his personal collection of 2500 stuffed birds to the Royal Museum of British Columbia, his papers and art to the local museum, and his property, his house Shakesides, and a sum of money in trust to the town of Comox.

Laing's manuscript about his ride across North America in 1914 was discovered among his papers after his death, and was published by Ronsdale Press in 2019 as Riding the Continent.

=== Shakesides controversy ===
In his later years, Laing had negotiated an agreement with the town of Comox to accept his land and buildings in trust for the public to enjoy, as long as the land was kept in a natural state and Shakesides turned into a natural history museum. Laing also left $45,000 in trust to the town to be used to set up the museum.

Although the town turned Laing's property into the Mack Laing Nature Park, the house was not converted into a museum, but instead was rented to various tenants for the next 32 years. After the last tenant left in 2014, the town did not do any upkeep on Shakesides, and vandalism left it in a precarious state, with a leaking roof and board-up windows. In 2021, the town council proposed to demolish Shakesides rather than convert it to a museum, and instead replace it with a nature viewing platform. The town was taken to the BC Supreme Court by the province's Attorney General because this was not part of the original trust provisions. The town asked the court for a variance to Mack Laing's will to allow them to do this. A local group opposed the town's plan, saying despite having trust funds to spend on maintenance, that 40 years of neglect by the town is what had brought the house to its perilous state. In April 2023, Madam Justice J.A. Power agreed that the town had not fulfilled the terms of Laing's will, but given the state of the house and the cost to restore it, she allowed the town's plan to replace the house with a viewing platform as long as the platform was built before Shakesides was demolished.
