= Lazo Marsh-North East Comox Wildlife Management Area =

Canadian wildlife management area

- IUCN category IV (habitat/species management area)
- Location within British Columbia Location within Canada
- Location: Comox Valley, British Columbia, Canada
- Nearest city: Comox
- Coordinates: 49°41′05″N 124°53′28″W
- Area: 159 hectares (1.59 km^{2})
- Elevation: 2–12 meters (6.6–39.4 ft)
- Established: 6 April 2001; 25 years ago
- Governing body: FLNRORD
- Website: Lazo Marsh-North East Comox Wildlife Management Area

Lazo Marsh-North East Comox Wildlife Management Area is a wildlife management area on the eastern coast of Vancouver Island, British Columbia, Canada. It was established by the British Columbia Ministry of Forests, Lands, Natural Resource Operations and Rural Development (FLNRORD) on 6 April 2001 to preserve local species. The marshlands is owned jointly by the K'omoxs First Nation, the towns' municipality, and the Comox Valley Regional District, and lays within both the traditional territories of the K'omoks people and the Pacific Temperate Rain Forest.

The Marsh is home to many species of fish, birds, flora and fauna; some endemic, some native to the area (both residential and migratory), and others invasive. The marsh has a long history of mixed uses and protections that have culminated into its present form and use.

== Geography ==
Located within the traditional territory of the K'omoks people, the Lazo Marsh-NE Management Area sits approximately 1.86 miles (3 km) East of the town of Comox and sits on a peninsula overlooking the Strait of Georgia. The marsh area varies in elevation from 2–12 meters above sea level. It is 159 hectares in size and is connected to the Comox North East Woods.

The marsh and greater Comox area are described as having a Marine West Coast, Warm Summer Climate (Cfb), having cool summers, mild winters and high humidity, with a relatively narrow temperature range.

The conservation lands on which the marsh sits are also under the District of Campbell River, as per the Natural Resource Regions and Districts of British Columbia.

== Environment ==
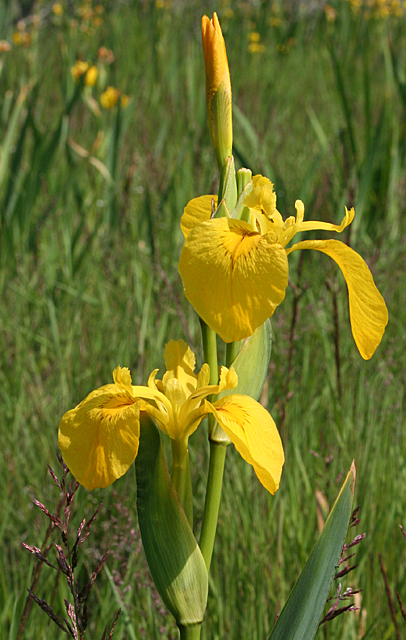
Yellow flagged iris (an invasive species found in the Lazo Marsh)

=== Ecosystems ===
The Lazo Marsh-North East Comox Conservation Area, is a part of a large conversation area which includes the neighboring Lazo Marsh, Comox North East Woods, and a sanctuary. The area(s) are connected through a series of trail networks for people to hike, bike, and enjoy.

The Marsh and surrounding (greater) area lay within the Coastal Western Hemlock Very Dry Maritime zone (CWHxm1) just North of the Coastal Douglas Fir Moist Maritime zone (CDFmm). These zones in turn as both part of the greater Pacific Temperate Rainforest. The surrounding area is made up of several rare ecosystems including wetland and riparian, as well as woodland and coastal bluffs.

The wetland ecosystem of which the conservation area is a part of has seen a roughly 30% reduction since 1992. Today the marsh land undergoes periodic (man-made) scarification by bulldozer(s) in order to aid in creating more open water for birds and other lifeforms.

=== Wildlife ===
The marsh has been a well established year-round home for a large variety of birds for some time, as well as home to several fish species, including coho salmon fry and several trout species. Some rare birds have been found at this site, such as the Red-flanked bluetail, which has only ever been spotted in Canada one other time as of 2016. One species of raptor that can be found in the marsh area is the Northern Pygmy Owl or Vancouver Island Pygmy-Owl (Glaucidium Gnoma Swarthi), which is endemic to the area.

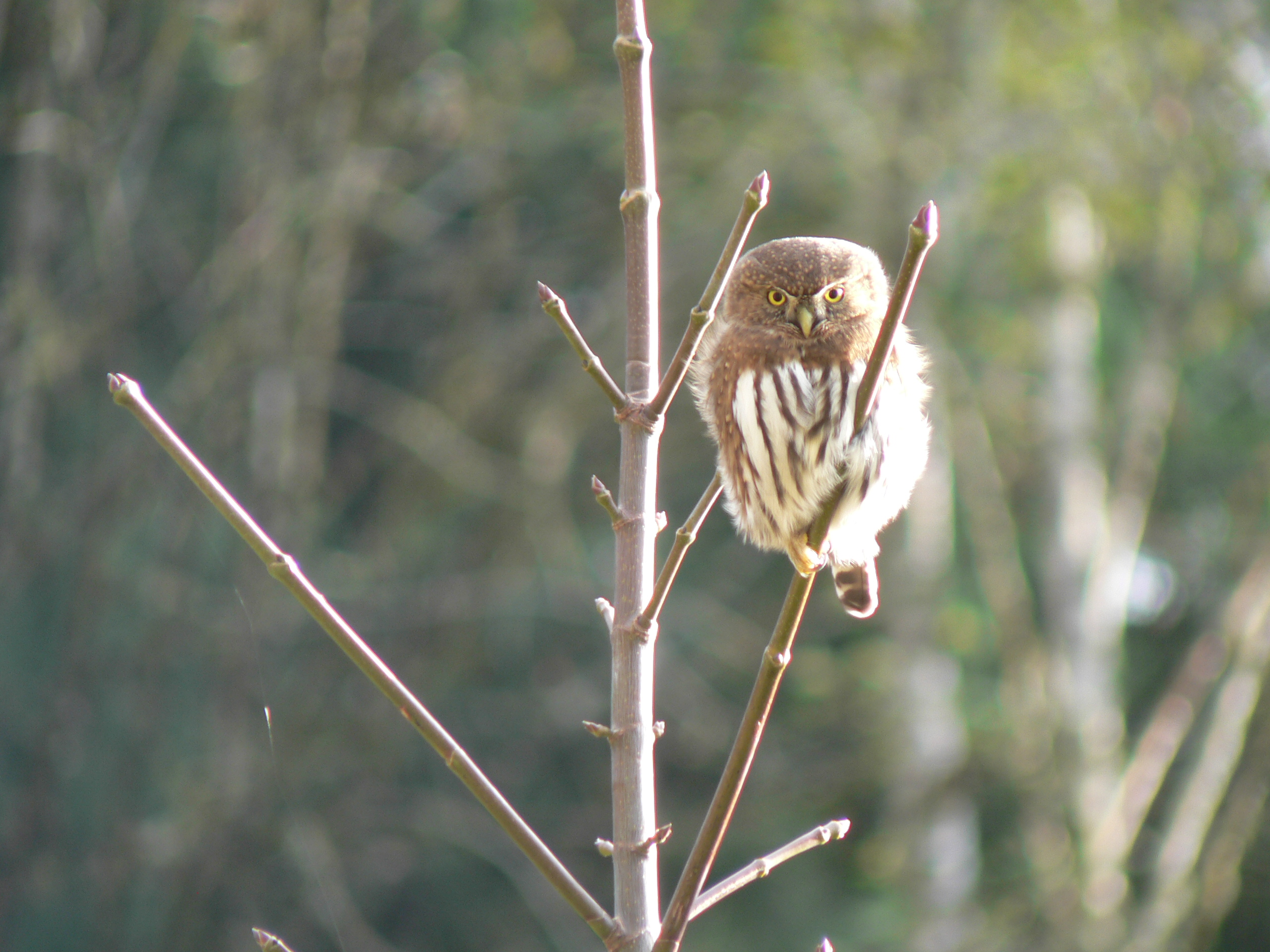
Northern pygmy owl perched on a tree branch

The marsh area is plagued by an invasion of yellow flag iris', which has proven resistant to mitigation efforts. The Iris pseudacorus is able to rapidly spread out and colonize new areas, in part thanks to the buoyancy of its seeds. This coupled, with the vast interconnected root systems that individual plants share, make it particularly difficult to exterminate and put server pressures on native species. Early detection and eradication is a key component to minimizing environmental damages and disturbances.

== History ==
The area surrounding the marsh and greater Comox valley has been inhabited since the last ice age, with European contact occurring in the 1700s. The marsh was briefly known as the Radford's Swamp, and today, the K'omoks First Nation engages in various ecological protect and restoration projects, including the sharing of land and caring for the Lazo Marsh. Much of the area was home to a vast amount of both resident and migratory bird species, however during the 1930s and 1940s the area was drained to make room for potato farming, until beaver damning interfered. The area was also briefly used by the neighbouring municipality as a dumping ground, and then later bought and established as a bird sanctuary.

In 1994 a public hearing was held in response to development proposals, where locals opposed the idea and the area as a whole as designated as Crown Forest. Eventually, in 2001 the Lazo March- North East Comox Wildlife Management Area was established.The view on this now-protected land wasn't always that of appreciation. Old scrap metal and car parts littered among the forest and marsh lands shows the view that this land was once thought of as a dump. Nowadays the trails and natural beauty of the landscape is a source of enjoyment and recreation for residents and visitors to the area. In 2022, the Friends of Comox-Lazo Forest Reserve society dissolved. A group originally formed in 1996 to advise and oversee protection of the marsh.
