= Comox, British Columbia =

Comox
- Town
- Town of Comox
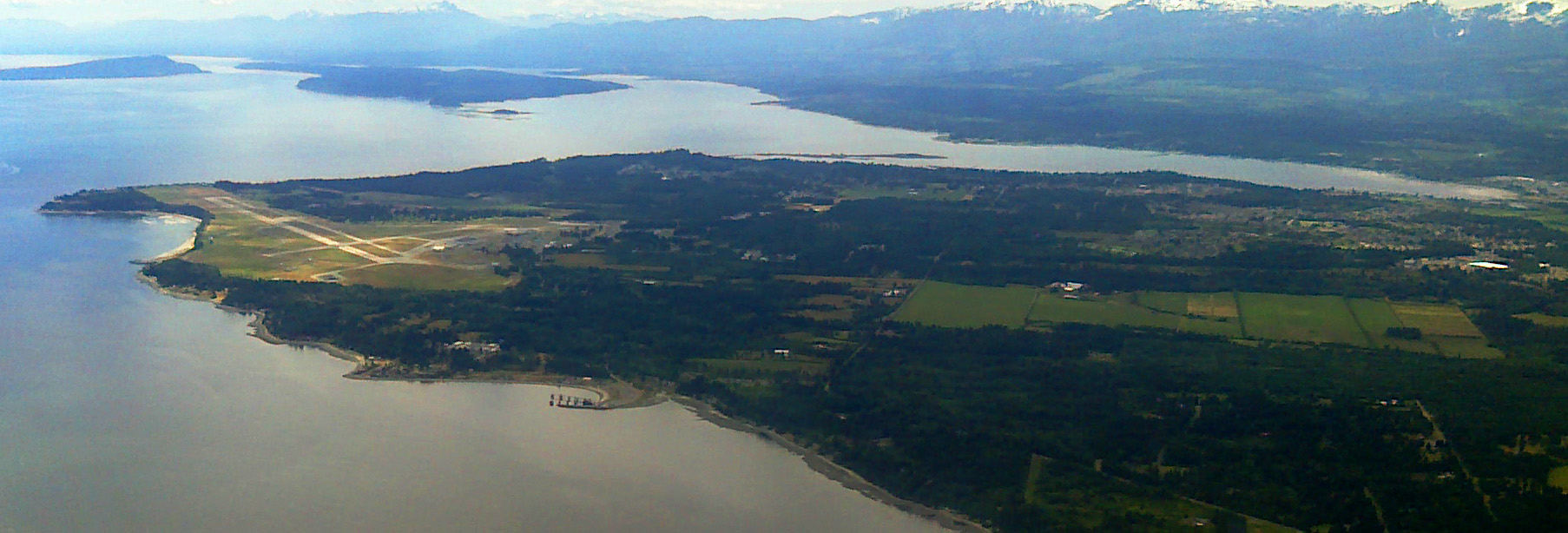
- Aerial view of Comox in 2011

- Flag Coat of arms

- Location of Comox in Vancouver Island, Canada
- Coordinates: 49°40′22″N 124°55′40″W
- Country: Canada
- Province: British Columbia
- Region: Mid-Island
- Regional district: Comox Valley
- Incorporated: 1953

Government
  - Mayor: Nicole Minions

Area (2021)
  - Total: 16.87 km^{2} (6.51 sq mi)
- Elevation: 84 m (276 ft)

Population (2021)
  - Total: 14,806
  - Density: 877.7/km^{2} (2,273/sq mi)
- Time zone: UTC−07:00 (PT)
- Forward sortation area: V9M
- Area codes: 250, 778, 236
- Website: www.comox.ca

Comox (English: /ˈkoʊmɒks/) is a town on the southern coast of the Comox Peninsula in the Strait of Georgia on the eastern coast of Vancouver Island, British Columbia. Thousands of years ago, the warm dry summers, mild winters, fertile soil, and abundant sea life attracted First Nations, who called the area kw'umuxws (Kwakʼwala, the adopted language of the Kʼómoks, for plentiful).

When the area was opened for settlement in the mid-19th century, it quickly attracted farmers, a lumber industry and a fishing industry. For over fifty years, the village remained isolated from the outside world other than by ship until roads and a railway were built into the area during the First World War. The installation of an air force base near the village during the Second World War brought new prosperity to the area, and in recent years, Comox attracts tourists for its fishing; local wildlife; year-round golf; and proximity to the Mount Washington ski area, the Forbidden Plateau, and Strathcona Provincial Park. The town is also home to a Royal Canadian Air Force base CFB Comox, an airport for military and commercial airline use and the Sea Cadet training facility HMCS Quadra. The mild climate has attracted many retirees to the area in the 21st century, which has resulted in a high rate of growth and a sharp increase in the median age of residents.

The town of Comox is in the Comox Valley. Other communities in the Comox Valley include Courtenay, Cumberland, and the unincorporated hamlets of Royston, Union Bay, Fanny Bay, Black Creek and Merville. The nearby Comox Glacier is visible from many parts of the town and is the area's signature landmark. It is close (17 km [11 mi]) to Denman Island in the Strait of Georgia.

== History ==
=== Before arrival of Europeans ===
Archaeological evidence suggests there was an active Coast Salish fishing settlement at Comox for at least 4,000 years. Due to its gentle climate, fertile soil and abundant sea life, the Laich-kwil-tach conquerors of the area, and of the Kʼómoks, called the area kw'umuxws (Li'kwala for plentiful), which was eventually anglicized to Komoux and then to Comox.

At the time of first contact with Europeans, the Pentlatch Nation, who spoke the Island Comox dialect of the Comox Coast Salish language, occupied the shores of present-day Comox Bay (The last speaker of the Island Comox dialect died in 1995). Another Island Comox speaking Nation, the Kʼómoks, occupied settlements further north along the east coast of Vancouver Island, in the area of present-day Campbell River, including Quadra Island and several other Gulf Islands.

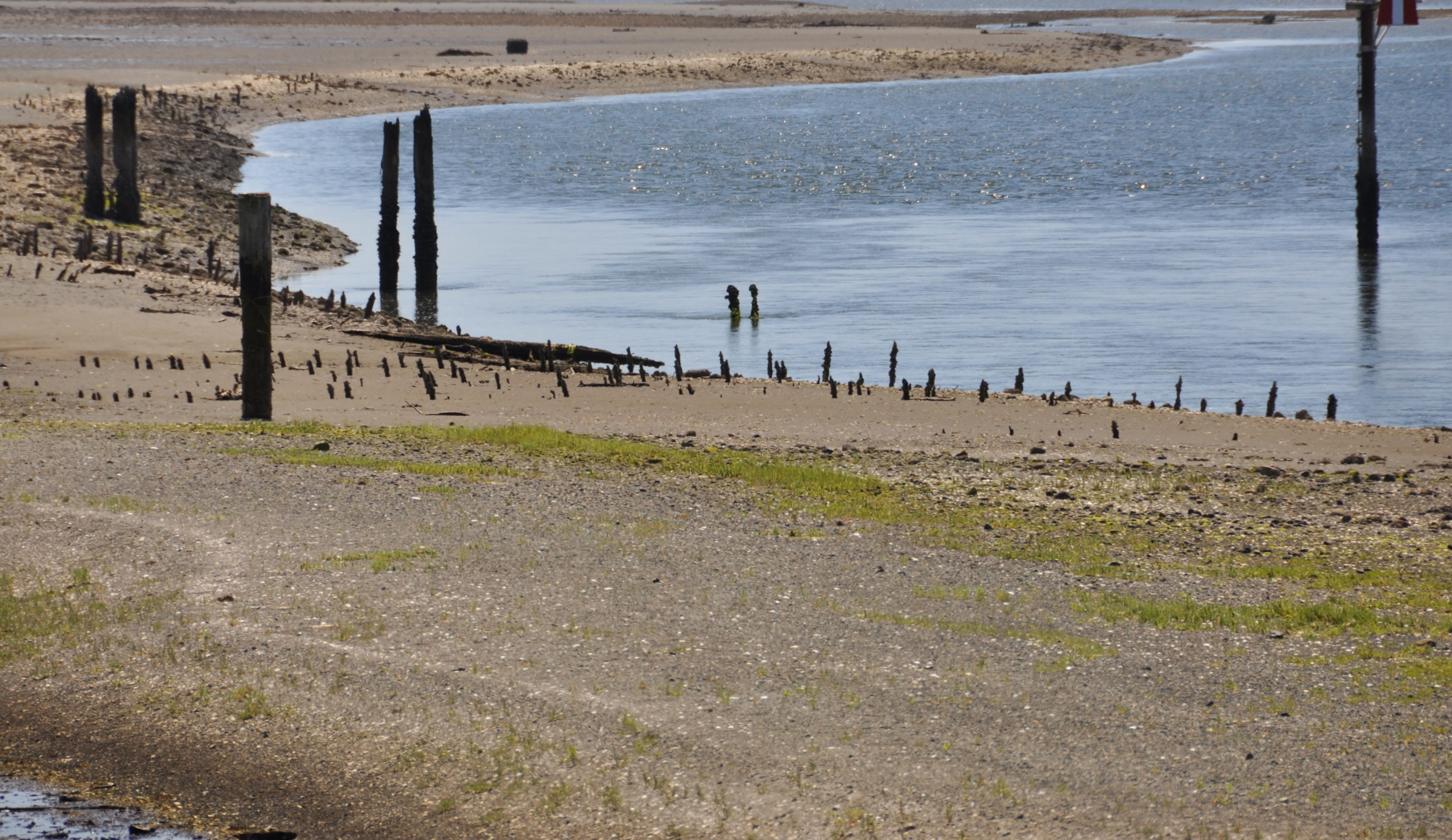
Low tide exposes thousands of small stakes once used by Coast Salish First Nations for fishing weirs.

At the fishing village located at present-day Comox, the Pentlatch set out elaborate fishing weirs—nets on tidal flats tied to wooden stakes that would be covered at high tide but uncovered at low tide, allowing trapped fish to be removed. These wooden stakes can still be seen at low tide—local archaeologist Nancy Greene has estimated that up to 200,000 wooden stakes remain in the mud flats. Several of these wooden stakes were carbon dated, revealing the oldest to be made from a hemlock tree c.750 CE, while the youngest dated from around 1830. Some scientists estimate that the weirs could have supported a population of several thousand people. The Pentlatch also harvested the abundant shellfish in Comox Bay. Centuries of discarded shells resulted in a deep strata of shell fragments along the shoreline of present-day Comox now known as the Great Comox Midden.

By the 19th century, the Kʼómoks had been driven out of their lands by a particularly fierce group of Kwakwakaʼwakw, the Laich-kwil-tach, who raided other villages to capture slaves. The Kʼómoks migrated south to present-day Comox, where they allied with the resident Pentlatch against their common enemy. In 1862, a smallpox epidemic swept across Vancouver Island, killing an estimated 30% of First Nations people. A census of First Nations in the Comox Valley taken in 1876 revealed that the local First Nations population had dwindled to only 88 Kʼómoks and 21 Pentlatch.

=== Early European explorers ===
In 1579, Francis Drake, on his circumnavigation of the globe in the Golden Hind, found a good port somewhere along the northwest coast of North America and stayed for several months while restocking supplies and trading with the inhabitants of the area. He named the region New Albion—Latin for "New Britain". Drake's detailed logs—and the exact location of Nova Albion— were later lost in a 17th-century fire, but some historians believe Drake made a landing at Comox.

In 1791, a Spanish expedition led by Dionisio Alcalá Galiano and Cayetano Valdés y Flores produced a crude chart of the Strait of Georgia and possibly visited Comox. Captain George Vancouver arrived the following year, tasked by the British government with charting the northwest coast of North America. Vancouver, in concert with the Spanish expedition, entered the Courtenay River estuary between the present-day locations of Courtenay and Comox and charted the shoreline of Comox.

=== Nineteenth century: settlement ===
By the middle of the 19th century, European and American settlements had sprung up in the Vancouver area and on southern Vancouver Island. In 1837, the Hudson's Bay Company steamship Beaver began to search the south and east coasts of Vancouver Island for suitable locations for new trading posts, and subsequently set up a post in the area, calling it "Komoux".

HMS Constance, commanded by Captain Courtenay, was a frequent visitor to the area, and was one of the first ships to use Augusta Bay and a long sandy hook-shaped spit (now "the Goose Spit") for gunnery practice. In 1848, the river flowing through the Koumax valley was informally named the Courtenay River by British sailors after their captain. In 1857, Captain George Richards of HMS Plumper was tasked with undertaking a complete survey of the coastline of Vancouver Island, and was given authority to name local landmarks. When he arrived in the area, he confirmed the name as the Courtenay River.

In 1853 Sir James Douglas, then governor of Vancouver Island, took a journey up the coast of Vancouver Island aboard SS Beaver, and recognized the area's agricultural potential. In 1861, Lieutenant Richard Mayne of the Royal Navy visited the area and wrote of the rich agricultural prospects of the area, saying it had taken him a day and a half to walk on the land "through which a plough might be driven from end to end". That same year Governor Douglas issued a land and settlement proclamation for the Koumox Valley, intending to divert new settlers away from the Victoria area as well as from the newly discovered Cariboo gold fields. He offered land in the valley for $1 per acre and free transportation to the area.

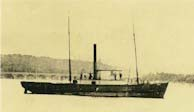
HMS Grappler, shown here in later service as a packet steamer. brought the first settlers to the Comox Valley in 1862

Although some unofficial settlers had arrived in previous years, the first government-approved settlers arrived in 1862 aboard HMS Grappler. Scottish immigrant James Robb, age 44, and his son William realized that the shoreline along the former Kʼómoks fishing village and the Great Comox Midden was sheltered from the prevailing south east winds by the sandy hook of the Goose Spit, and would be the only place between the Courtenay River and the Spit suitable for landing supplies. Rather than claiming lots on the relatively flat and untreed "prairies" along the east side of the Courtenay River like the other settlers, Robb and his son preempted 106 ha (262 acres) of steep and heavily forested land along the shore of the bay, with the idea of clearing the land, building a dock and then selling town lots for the village that would inevitably spring up at the site.

Two years later, Frederick Whymper, a member of the Vancouver Island Exploring Expedition, visited Robb's land, and wrote, "Here Mr. Robb with laudable faith in the country has preempted land though the site is principally bush: when he could have got good prairie land as he came among the first two years ago."

By this time, as Robb had foreseen, supplies for the settlers had to be landed on his property, which became known as "The Landing", or formally "Port Augusta", named by the settlers after a member of the British royal family. James Robb by this time had also set up a prosperous farm, although he and his son spent a lot of time clearing land of timber in the hopes of selling it by the lot.

The Hudson's Bay Company and the British Admiralty promised the settlers that there would be regular mail service to the area via steamship, and Governor Douglas committed to building a road from Nanaimo. However, it quickly became clear that a wagon road would be too expensive; a bridle path with some bridges was built instead. Flooding and tree falls made maintenance of this path impractical, and the trail was soon abandoned. Supplies and mail continued to arrive by ship, but service was irregular, and delivery was measured in months rather than weeks.

A narrow trail was soon built to connect The Landing with the nearby settlers on the Courtenay River, and by 1860, this had been widened enough that an ox cart could pass.

In 1864, seams of high quality coal were discovered in nearby foothills, but it would be two decades before mining would begin.

In 1865, Reverend J. Cave Brown Cave, an Anglican missionary, complained to a local magistrate that a group of Eucletaw (Laich-kwil-tach) from Cape Mudge had moved to the area and were camped on a Kʼómoks potato patch; Cave demanded that they be removed from the area, due to alleged thefts of potatoes and friction with the Kʼómoks people. James Robb, who did not get along with Cave, disagreed. The argument grew so vociferous that a small British naval squadron—HMS Sutlej, HMS Elias and HMS Sparrowhawk—under the command of Rear-Admiral John Kingcome was dispatched to the area to sort out the problem. The rear-admiral listened to all sides of the argument, then commended Cave for his letter, advised that Robb's conduct should be investigated, and returned the Eucletaw to Cape Mudge.

By 1876, the Kʼómoks and Pentledge had been moved onto two reservations: Comox Indian Reserve No. 1 adjacent to the village of Comox, and Pentledge Indian Reserve No. 2 at the confluence of the Puntledge and Tsolum rivers adjacent to the village of Courtenay. A third area of four to five hectares (ten to twelve acres), Graveyard Indian Reserve #3 on the Goose Spit, was also allocated in recognition of the historic burial grounds there.

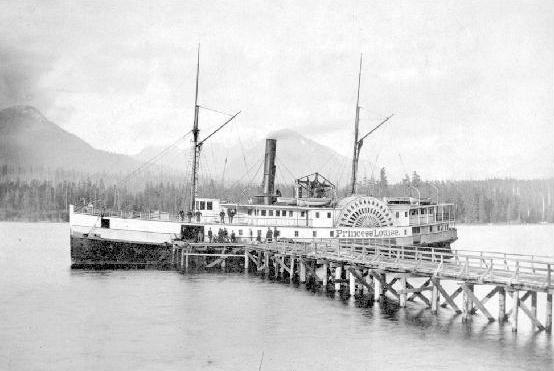
Before railways and highways reached Comox, mail and supplies were provided by steamboats, such as the sidewheel Princess Louise, shown at the end of the Comox Wharf on August 20, 1879

The old Hudson's Bay post had been built up on a hill overlooking the bay. In 1868, Adam Grant Horne, the manager of the Hudson's Bay Company post, recommended that a lot be purchased from James Robb close to where a wharf would likely be built, but he was ignored by his superiors. Six years later, the provincial government provided a grant of $3,337 to build a wharf at The Landing, consisting of a pier 315 m (1,033 ft) long with a 15 m (49 ft) wharf head. This allowed passengers and supplies to be offloaded directly from large ships without the need for smaller boats of shallow draught. An Italian immigrant named Joseph Rodello shrewdly bought from James Robb the two lots on the shore immediately to either side of the wharf, and quickly built a store beside the end of the wharf so that his supplies arriving by packet steamer would not have to be dragged up the hill into town.

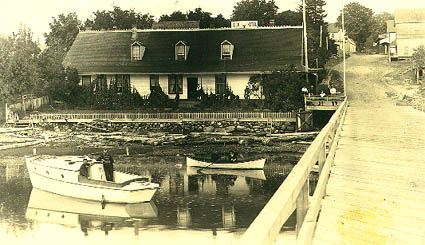
The Elk Hotel, built at the foot of the Comox wharf by Joseph Rodello in 1877. The photographer was standing on the pier facing the shore and Wharf Road.

By 1871, the census counted 102 inhabitants in the area of The Landing, mostly single men, an indication that a true village had not yet developed. In 1876, the Royal Navy, desiring a permanent presence in the area, built a naval base on the Goose Spit despite the presence of the Kʼómoks burial grounds. The following year, Joseph Rodello expanded his business presence by building the Elk Hotel on the opposite side of the road from his store, thus owning the first two businesses that visitors encountered as they stepped off the wharf. The first school was built on Anderton Road in 1877. It was a one-room school for grades 1 to 8

As the Hudson's Bay factor Adam Grant Horne had predicted a decade earlier, his trading post was too far away from the wharf to be profitable, and in 1878, it was closed. That same year, John Fitzpatrick bought a lot from James Robb and built the Lorne Hotel, named after the Marquis of Lorne, then Governor General of Canada. Robb also managed to sell a few other lots, notably for a butcher shop and the local courthouse and jail. In 1880, Rodello's store beside the wharf burned to the ground, but he rebuilt, and the new store was reopened in 1882. In 1886, St. John the Baptist Catholic Church was built, but had to be rebuilt two years later when trees uprooted by a violent storm landed on it.

In 1884, the provincial government passed the Land Act, which abolished the onerous requirement for settlers to improve the land that they had purchased. Land became more valuable, and the asking price for James Robb's town lots rose to $300.

In 1888, mines opened at the nearby village of Cumberland to harvest the rich seams of coal. When executive of the mines sought to buy up James Robb's Landing in order to make it a railhead for coal from the mines, they balked when he insisted his farm was worth $80,000. Instead, they built a wharf on the other side of Augusta Bay at the village of Union Bay. The influx of miners and shipping largely bypassed Port Augusta.

In 1889, James Robb died, his ambitious vision unrealized. After years of back-breaking labour clearing land for town lots, Robb and his son had only sold a few lots in Port Augusta at the time of his death, mainly for businesses located on the road leading up the hill from the wharf. By coincidence, Joseph Rodello, buyer of the first two town lots from Robb, and in later years "a thorn in Robb's side", also died at the same time. Rivals in life, both men shared a combined obituary in the local newspaper.

In 1891, the Comox and South Comox subdistricts had a population of 688. That same year, the Comox District Free Press—affectionately known as "the Yellow Paper"—began publishing.

In 1893, the provincial government, without consulting the local residents, abruptly changed the name of the village, the valley and the bay from Augusta to Comox. Two years later, a telegraph office opened in the renamed village, providing an instantaneous link to the outside world.

In 1898, J.B. Holmes built the Port Augusta Hotel, which would also act as a store and even a church in the coming years.

=== Twentieth century ===
In the early years of the 20th century, technology began to arrive in the Comox Valley, starting in 1910 with telephone service. The same year, the Comox Logging and Railway Company was incorporated, and started moving steam-powered equipment to the area to exploit the stands of old growth Douglas fir lying between Comox and Campbell River. With sole access to these forests, the company quickly became the largest logging concern on Coastal British Columbia. Eventually the company had 450 employees who used six huge steam-powered logging machines, a dozen locomotives, and hundreds of miles of train track to move billions of board feet of logs down to the coast, where the timber was boomed and towed to the largest sawmilling operation in the British Empire at New Westminster. Also in 1910, the road from Nanaimo promised almost 60 years before was finally built, linking the Comox Valley to southern Vancouver Island. The first automobile owned by Walter Scott came to Comox in 1910 but at that time most of the roads were a hazard to navigate and most were primitive horse and buggy trails. Electricity arrived in nearby Courtenay in 1913 courtesy of a hydroelectric dam on the Puntledge River, but service was not extended to Comox until 1920. In 1914 the E&N Railway arrived in nearby Courtenay, and daily mail service to and from the outside world, now delivered by rail rather than ship, became quick and reliable. The influx of loggers and the attendant injuries clearly required a hospital, and in 1914, four nursing sisters from the order of St. Joseph in Toronto arrived to staff the new St. Joseph's Hospital, originally a re-purposed house with room for only ten patients, although it expanded rapidly in the following years.

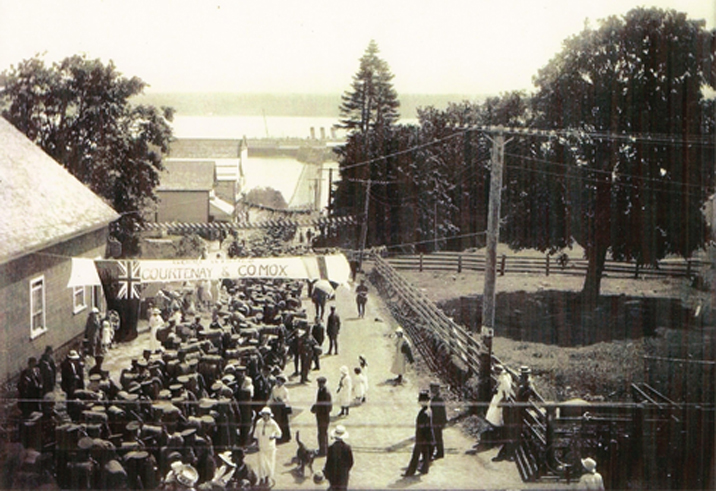
On June 10, 1916, soldiers of the 102nd Regiment march down Wharf Road to embark on SS Princess Charlotte

With the advent of the First World War I in 1914, many local men wished to join the Canadian Expeditionary Force but had to travel out of the Valley in order to enlist. In response, the local 102nd Battalion was formed on November 5, 1915, drawing recruits from across northern British Columbia and eventually reaching a total strength of 3,863. Their training camp was at the Goose Spit, and through one of the coldest and snowiest winters in memory, shelter and clothing proved to be totally inadequate. Ironically, these trials better prepared the soldiers for the ordeals of trench warfare. On June 10, 1916, the men embarked on SS Princess Charlotte for their long journey to Europe. Ten days later in Halifax, they were transferred to RMS Empress of Britain for the voyage to England. They arrived in France on August 12, in time to participate in the closing days of the 1916 Somme campaign. From that time, they were involved in every major action by the Canadian Corps, resulting in a 62% casualty rate. Soldiers of the battalion were Mentioned in Dispatches twenty-six times, and were awarded one Victoria Cross, five Distinguished Service Medals, and two hundred and twenty-seven Military Crosses or Military Medals.

During the Great War, prohibition in Canada closed down the Lorne and Elk Hotels. Following the repeal of prohibition in British Columbia in 1921, both hotels were quickly reopened. That same year William Robb died, still the owner of unsold lots of as-yet undeveloped land, as the population of the tiny village still hovered around 200. A newcomer to the area, Sidney "Dusty" d'Esterre, had already bought up Joseph Rodello's old Elk Hotel, and he now put together a consortium of local businessmen to buy up Robb's property. Some was set aside for a new golf course, of which d'Esterre was a director, while the rest was sold off in lots.

D'Esterre was born in 1884 in Bermuda and had family ties to the de Beers diamond and gold mines in South Africa. He became a local man of mystery—rumour had it that he had been a friend of the Crown Prince. Whenever ships of the Royal Navy visited the area, they always lowered their flags as they passed his house, a mark of respect accorded to him because—according to local rumour—d'Esterre had been involved in secret service activities during the Great War. D'Esterre sought to bring tourists to the area by advertising in Vancouver and Victoria newspapers, extolling the local abundance of "Tyee"—chinook salmon weighing more than 13.5 kg (30 lb)—and Comox quickly attracted affluent anglers and tourists. The Comox Golf Company was formed in 1922 and d'Esterre had an idea that began tourism in the area. He advertised Comox area tennis courts, golf, boating, swimming, hunting and fishing as well as a new dining room and electric lights which had the effect of adding Comox as a holiday destination spot.

However, while Courtenay and Cumberland were booming with economic activity, Comox remained a sleepy village visited by rich tourists drawn by the sport fishing, golf and the newly opened ski resorts on Forbidden Plateau. The population of the village actually decreased in the years between the First and Second World Wars.

In 1922, ornithologist and naturalist Hamilton Mack Laing moved to Comox, having been encouraged to visit by his friend Allan Brooks. Laing, who counted ornithologists Percy A. Taverner and Allan Brooks among his friends, would become an influential voice in the nascent conservation movement over the next 50 years, with hundreds of articles published in almost every birding and nature magazine in North America. He purchased land along the shoreline of Comox Bay, built a house he called Baybrook, and established a 900-tree nut farm. When his wife died in 1946, he sold Baybrook and had a second house built, which he called Shakesides.

In 1924, the army abandoned its base on the Goose Spit at the request of the Royal Navy, which wanted to resume using it as a base. A new Comox school was built in 1927 to replace the one on Anderton Road, and the Little River and Knob Hill schools. The Comox 9 hole Golf Course opened as a private course in 1928 and later as a public course in 1934, a course which continues in use to this day.

In 1929, R.J. ("Bob") Filberg, manager and superintendent of the giant Comox Logging and Railway Company, and his wife Florence commissioned master builder William Haggarty to build a rustic summer lodge on top of a part of the Great Comox Midden on the shores of Comox Bay. The resulting structure incorporated local stone and timber, as well as a native petroglyph and British naval cannonballs. Although the lodge was intended only as a summer residence, the Filbergs were so entranced by it that they made it their full-time residence in 1935, and continued to add outbuildings and gardens on the grounds.

In 1931, "C" Company of the Canadian Scottish Regiment was formed and based in Comox. With the start of the Second World War in 1939, "C" Company was sent to England. After four years of training, they took part in the Canadian D-Day assault on Juno Beach, and ended the day more than 10 km (6.2 mi) inland, the furthest advance of any Allied unit.

In 1940, the Royal Navy built a training facility on the Goose Spit and called it HMCS Naden (III).

In 1941, Highway 1, built over the original road from Nanaimo, became the first provincial highway into the Comox Valley. Although only a rough gravel road that meandered along the coast, it was an improvement over the previous road, and also connected Comox with Campbell River to the north.

In 1942, following the attack on Pearl Harbor, the Royal Air Force (RAF) sought to set up a base on Vancouver Island from which air patrols could guard against Japanese incursions. Due to its many days of good flying conditions year round, Comox was chosen as the site, and RAF Station Comox was quickly built. The following year, the Royal Canadian Air Force (RCAF) took over operations, and in addition to patrols over the Pacific, also used the base to train transport aircraft crews flying the Douglas Dakota.

Following the end of the Second World War, the base was mothballed, and Comox returned to its former state as a small fishing village, with a population of less than 1,000. However, in 1952, due to Cold War tensions, the base was re-activated and has been in continuous operation since then as CFB Comox (YQQ). The airfield was extended to 10,000 ft (3,000 m) and an extensive modernization program began in 1954. A civilian terminal was added to the airfield in 1956 run by Transport Canada until 1996 when the management of the civilian terminal was taken over by the Comox Valley Airport Commission, a management arrangement that continues today. The Comox Valley Airport continues to be a joint use military-civilian airfield with scheduled passenger airline flights primarily to Vancouver, Calgary and Edmonton as well as to other regional destinations in British Columbia.

In 1952, Highway 1 was rebuilt and paved, becoming Highway 19. Steam-powered logging equipment was phased out in the 1950s, replaced by new gas- and diesel-powered machines, but in the 1960s, all the accessible first growth forests had been logged out.

In 1954, HMCS Naden (III) was converted to a cadet training base and was renamed HMCS Quadra in 1956.

By 1967, the influx of military personnel had driven the town population up to 2,500, aided by the fact that some air force personnel assigned to the base chose to return to the area permanently following retirement. However, in the 1970s, the provincial government declared most of the valley to be an agricultural land reserve, slowing the burgeoning development in the village to a crawl. In 1972, the old Elk Hotel at the foot of Wharf Road, now used as a dance hall, was destroyed by fire. Shortly afterwards, James Robb's 90-year-old pier at the end of Wharf Road was demolished, and landfill was used to create a sheltering seawall for fishing vessels, as well as a marina for recreational craft. In 1977, former lumber giant Bob Filberg died and bequeathed his lodge to the Vancouver Foundation. When local residents discovered that the lodge was slated to be demolished and its grounds turned into a housing development, arrangements were made with the Comox town council to turn the lodge and grounds into a public park known as the Filberg Heritage Lodge and Park.

In 1979, the first ski runs on Mount Washington Alpine Resort were built, bringing in new tourists. However, in 1982, the local economy suffered when 409 Squadron was transferred to CFB Cold Lake in Alberta, resulting in sizeable transfer of personnel and their families, and a resultant loss of service industry jobs. This, coupled with the recession of the 1980s, resulted in a decrease in land values as families moved out of the town. The number of homes sold annually dropped from 420 to 150.

In 1983, naturalist Hamilton Mack Laing died, and left his house Shakesides and his undeveloped land along the shore of Comox Bay to the town on the condition that the land be left in its natural state. The result was the Mack Laing Nature Park, with a trail that runs from the last untouched section of the Great Comox Midden up through 3 ha (7.4 acres) of second-growth forest.

In 1991, the local economy was given a boost when 414 Composite Squadron was assigned to CFB Comox. Retirees from other walks of life also began to move to Comox. Although farming was on the wane in the Valley, property values began to rise as land in the town was developed for the new residents.

In 1987 the Comox Valley Record started publishing in competition with the Comox District Free Press. Two years later the Free Press was purchased by the Thomson Corporation, and when employees went on strike in 1994, the new owners closed the paper down rather than accede to their demands. Many of the laid-off employees founded the Comox Valley Echo the following year.

In 1994, Queen Elizabeth II briefly toured the town during her visit to Canada.

=== Twenty-first century ===
By the turn of the 21st century, although Comox Valley contained half of the agricultural land on Vancouver Island, jobs were moving away from other resource-based industries such as fishing and logging. The largest employers were now CFB 19 Wing Comox, the local school board, Mount Washington Alpine Resort and St. Joseph Hospital. Daily commercial jet service helped expand tourism and business opportunities in the town, and Comox's population, which had remained stagnant since the 1970s, increased by 6.5% from 2001 to 2006. Many of the newcomers were retirees, raising the town's median age from 42.1 to 46.2 in only 5 years.

In 2011, the 133-year-old Lorne Hotel, still an ongoing commercial enterprise and the oldest free-standing licensed hotel in British Columbia, was destroyed by fire.

== Demographics ==
In the 2021 Canadian census conducted by Statistics Canada, Comox had a population of 14,806 living in 6,442 of its 6,672 total private dwellings, a change of 5.5% from its 2016 population of 14,028. With a land area of 16.87 km^{2} (6.51 sq mi), it had a population density of 877.7/km^{2} (2,273.1/sq mi) in 2021.

According to the federal 2021 census, the median age in 2016 was 52.5 years old with 49.6 for men and 55.2 for women. Median after-tax household income (2020) was $74,500.

=== Ethnicity ===
Panethnic groups in the Town of Comox (2001−2021)
Panethnic group	2021		2016		2011		2006		2001	
Panethnic group	Pop.	%	Pop.	%	Pop.	%	Pop.	%	Pop.	%
European (Note: Statistic includes all persons that did not make up part of a visible minority or an indigenous identity.)	12,645	88.24%	12,410	90.55%	12,520	94.24%	11,275	93.88%	10,470	95.05%
Indigenous	980	6.84%	780	5.69%	450	3.39%	360	3%	360	3.27%
East Asian (Note: Statistic includes total responses of "Chinese", "Korean", and "Japanese" under visible minority section on census.)	210	1.47%	220	1.61%	100	0.75%	75	0.62%	80	0.73%
Southeast Asian (Note: Statistic includes total responses of "Filipino" and "Southeast Asian" under visible minority section on census.)	160	1.12%	75	0.55%	55	0.41%	35	0.29%	40	0.36%
South Asian	100	0.7%	60	0.44%	30	0.23%	10	0.08%	20	0.18%
African	100	0.7%	60	0.44%	100	0.75%	215	1.79%	30	0.27%
Latin American	30	0.21%	50	0.36%	25	0.19%	30	0.25%	10	0.09%
Middle Eastern (Note: Statistic includes total responses of "West Asian" and "Arab" under visible minority section on census.)	0	0%	20	0.15%	0	0%	20	0.17%	10	0.09%
Other/multiracial (Note: Statistic includes total responses of "Visible minority, n.i.e." and "Multiple visible minorities" under visible minority section on census.)	105	0.73%	35	0.26%	0	0%	10	0.08%	10	0.09%
Total responses	14,330	96.79%	13,705	97.7%	13,285	97.49%	12,010	98.96%	11,015	96.7%
Total population	14,806	100%	14,028	100%	13,627	100%	12,136	100%	11,391	100%
Note: Totals greater than 100% due to multiple origin responses.

=== Language ===
As of 2016, 12,440 gave English as their "mother tongue", followed by French, at 480.

=== Religion ===
According to the 2021 census, religious groups in Comox included:

- Irreligion (8,415 persons or 58.7%)
- Christianity (5,540 persons or 38.7%)
- Buddhism (70 persons or 0.5%)
- Judaism (40 persons or 0.3%)
- Sikhism (35 persons or 0.2%)
- Hinduism (25 persons or 0.2%)
- Islam (10 persons or 0.1%)
- Other (205 persons or 1.4%)

== Climate ==
Comox has a warm-summer mediterranean climate (Köppen Csb). Due to its position on a small peninsula surrounded by the waters of the Strait of Georgia, Comox Bay and the Courtenay River estuary, Comox enjoys temperate weather year-round: summer temperatures average 22 °C (72 °F) and rarely reach 30 °C (86 °F), while winter temperatures rarely fall below freezing. Although annual precipitation averages 1,179 mm (46.4 in), almost 80% of this falls between October and March, mainly as rain rather than snow. The result is dry, sunny summers, and mild, wet winters.

The all time heat record for Comox is 38.0 °C (100.4 °F) which was set on June 27, 2021, at the Comox weather station.

Climate data for Comox (Comox Airport) WMO ID: 71893; coordinates 49°43′N 124°54′W; elevation: 25.6 m (84 ft); 1991–2020 normals, extremes 1991–present
Month	Jan	Feb	Mar	Apr	May	Jun	Jul	Aug	Sep	Oct	Nov	Dec	Year
Record high humidex	16.2	15.8	19.6	26.2	31.6	37.3	40.4	40.3	33.7	26.0	20.9	17.7	40.4
Record high °C (°F)	16.7 (62.1)	16.3 (61.3)	19.6 (67.3)	26.8 (80.2)	31.7 (89.1)	38 (100)	35.2 (95.4)	33.6 (92.5)	31.7 (89.1)	22.9 (73.2)	17.8 (64.0)	17.4 (63.3)	35.2 (95.4)
Mean daily maximum °C (°F)	6.3 (43.3)	7.2 (45.0)	9.5 (49.1)	12.9 (55.2)	17.2 (63.0)	19.9 (67.8)	23.1 (73.6)	23.0 (73.4)	19.1 (66.4)	12.9 (55.2)	8.7 (47.7)	6.2 (43.2)	13.8 (56.8)
Daily mean °C (°F)	3.9 (39.0)	4.2 (39.6)	6.1 (43.0)	9.0 (48.2)	12.9 (55.2)	15.7 (60.3)	18.5 (65.3)	18.3 (64.9)	14.8 (58.6)	9.6 (49.3)	5.9 (42.6)	3.7 (38.7)	10.2 (50.4)
Mean daily minimum °C (°F)	1.5 (34.7)	1.2 (34.2)	2.6 (36.7)	5.0 (41.0)	8.6 (47.5)	11.5 (52.7)	13.7 (56.7)	13.5 (56.3)	10.5 (50.9)	6.3 (43.3)	3.1 (37.6)	1.3 (34.3)	6.6 (43.9)
Record low °C (°F)	−21.1 (−6.0)	−16.1 (3.0)	−13.9 (7.0)	−4.4 (24.1)	−2.8 (27.0)	0.5 (32.9)	5.0 (41.0)	3.3 (37.9)	−1.7 (28.9)	−4.8 (23.4)	−13.3 (8.1)	−15.0 (5.0)	−21.1 (−6.0)
Record low wind chill	−18.6	−21.6	−16.1	−5.9	−2.0	0.0	0.0	0.0	−2.7	−9.8	−20.3	−25.0	−25.0
Average precipitation mm (inches)	177.4 (6.98)	111.6 (4.39)	107.5 (4.23)	64.1 (2.52)	40.3 (1.59)	41.8 (1.65)	23.8 (0.94)	31.2 (1.23)	46.7 (1.84)	125.4 (4.94)	188.8 (7.43)	193.6 (7.62)	1,152.2 (45.36)
Average rainfall mm (inches)	165.1 (6.50)	102.6 (4.04)	98.4 (3.87)	64.1 (2.52)	40.3 (1.59)	41.8 (1.65)	23.8 (0.94)	31.2 (1.23)	46.7 (1.84)	125.3 (4.93)	183.5 (7.22)	177.3 (6.98)	1,099.9 (43.30)
Average snowfall cm (inches)	12.4 (4.9)	9.0 (3.5)	6.8 (2.7)	0.0 (0.0)	0.0 (0.0)	0.0 (0.0)	0.0 (0.0)	0.0 (0.0)	0.0 (0.0)	0.1 (0.0)	5.5 (2.2)	16.9 (6.7)	50.8 (20.0)
Average precipitation days (≥ 0.2 mm)	19.9	16.2	16.9	13.9	11.6	11.2	7.1	7.0	9.8	17.1	19.7	21.2	171.6
Average rainy days (≥ 0.2 mm)	18.9	15.0	16.3	13.9	11.6	11.2	7.1	7.0	9.8	17.0	19.4	20.2	167.5
Average snowy days (≥ 0.2 cm)	2.4	2.3	1.6	0.07	0.0	0.0	0.0	0.0	0.0	0.10	0.83	2.7	10.0
Average relative humidity (%) (at 1500 LST)	83.8	76.5	70.4	63.8	61.5	60.2	57.3	57.6	62.8	75.8	81.3	83.4	69.5
Mean monthly sunshine hours	57.8	87.6	125.2	182.5	230.7	230.1	300.0	268.8	226.9	116.3	57.6	41.4	1,925.8
Percentage possible sunshine	21.6	30.7	34.0	44.3	48.5	47.4	61.1	60.1	59.8	34.7	21.0	16.3	40.0
Source: Environment and Climate Change Canada (sun 1981–2010)

== Local attractions ==
The Filberg Festival, named for the park in which it is held, is an arts and crafts fair that takes place each summer on the BC Day long weekend. On the same weekend, Comox also holds "Nautical Days" in Comox Marina Park, featuring an arts and crafts festival, a parade, a classic car show, the "Build, Bail and Sail" amateur boat-building competition and live music.

Comox is host to two of the nine local museums in the Comox Valley. Comox Museum and Archives offers a glimpse into the history of the town of Comox. The Comox Air Force Museum commemorates the role and history of 19 Wing, and documents significant achievements in coastal military aviation history.

The Comox North-East Woods is a conservation area home to numerous walking and biking trails. It also includes the Lazo Marsh- North East Comox Wildlife Management Area.

Goose Spit Park is a sand spit formed by the Willemar Bluffs, which, along with Gartley Point enclose the Comox Harbour. The park features a diverse shoreline of both rocky and sandy beaches, offering views to the east and west. It is a popular destination for outdoor recreation, including paddle boarding, kayaking, and kiteboarding.

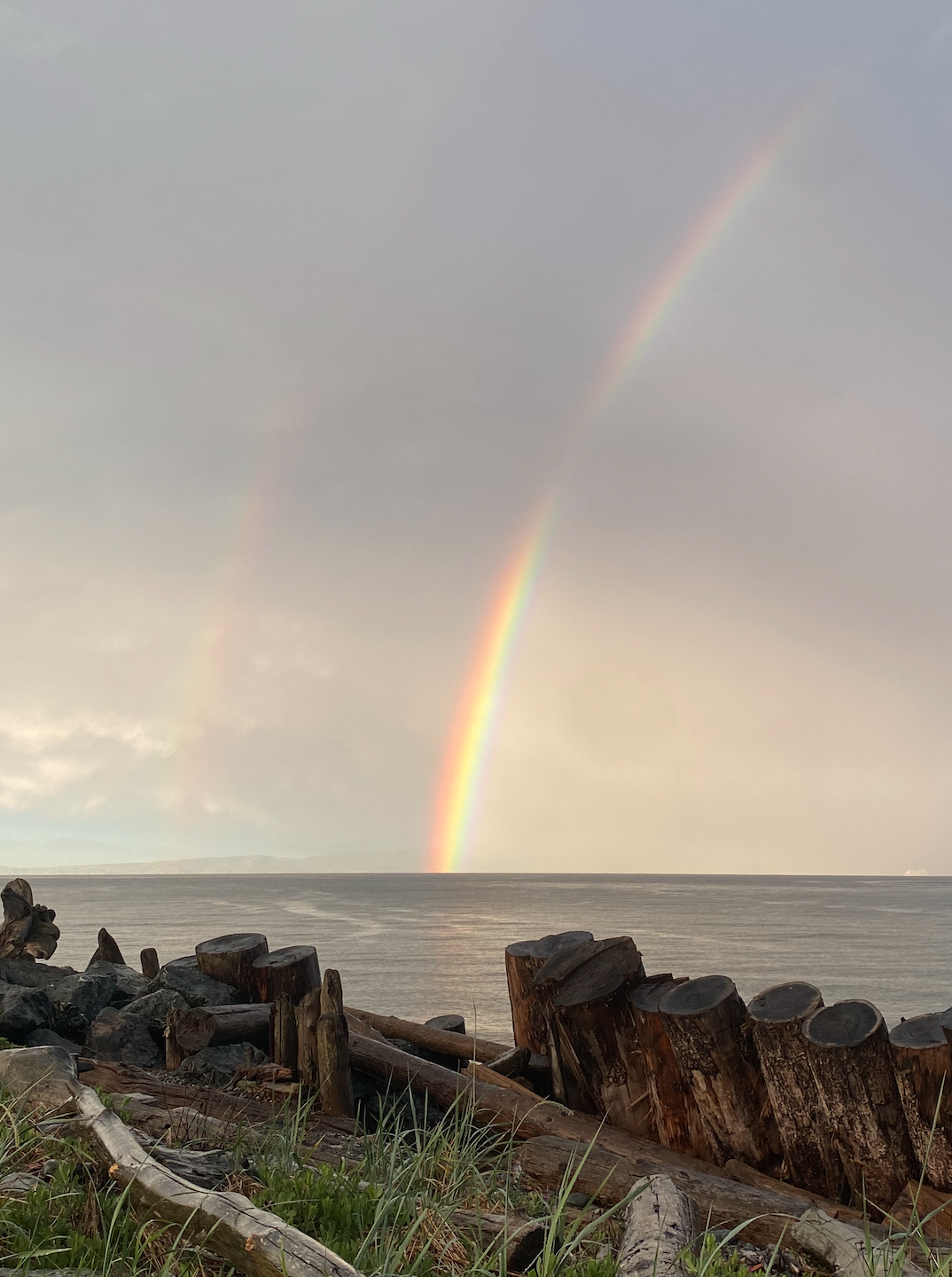
East Facing View from Goose Spit Park

== Health care ==
St. Joseph General Hospital (SJGH) was founded by four nuns from the Sisters of St. Joseph of Toronto in 1913, to provide the needed health care to the settlers of the Comox Valley and its active logging industry. Initially housed in a converted house with room for only 10 patients, it grew to 235 beds, 110 for acute care and 125 for complex care.

In 2017 the new north island hospital opened in Courtenay and subsequently St Joseph's hospital ceased to be an acute care facility. It still provides laboratory services and also houses "The Views", residential care and services to members of the community who can no longer live alone independently. The Views at St. Joseph's is owned and operated by the Providence Residential & Community Care (PRCC) Services Society. It is accountable to – and works in partnership with – our residents, patients, and their families, the Vancouver Island Health Authority, The B.C. Ministry of Health and the taxpayers of B.C. The Views at St. Joseph's operates under a Master Agreement between the Province of British Columbia and the Denominational Health Association. The agreement recognizes the rights of owners of denominational care facilities to own, manage and operate their respective facilities and carry out their respective religious missions. It obligates the owners to meet provincial standards and national accreditation for health care.

== Education ==
The School District 71 Comox Valley operates public schools in Comox.

Elementary schools:

- Airport Elementary
- Aspen Park Elementary
- Brooklyn Elementary
- École Au Coeur de l'île (Francophone school)
- École Robb Road Elementary (French immersion)

Secondary schools:

- Highland Secondary School

(Some Comox students attend Mark R. Isfeld Senior Secondary School or Georges P. Vanier Secondary School in Courtenay)

Comox is also home to the private Christian school (K–12), the Phil and Jennie Gaglardi Academy.

The Conseil scolaire francophone de la Colombie-Britannique operates one Francophone primary and secondary school, École Au-coeur-de-l'île.

=== Post-secondary education ===
- North Island College
- Excel Career College
- North Island Distance Education Society
- Sprott Shaw College

== Media ==
=== Print ===
- Comox Valley Record
- Island Word
- CFB Comox Totem Times

=== Radio ===
- CKLR-FM – 97.3 MHz
- CFCP-FM – 98.9 MHz

=== Television ===
- Shaw TV – Cable 4

== Notable people ==
These people either grew up in, or spent a significant portion of their life, in Comox:

- Pamela Anderson, actress, Baywatch
- Carle Brenneman, Olympic snowboarder
- Brett Cairns, Air Force Major General
- Byron Dafoe, National Hockey League (NHL) hockey player
- Taylor Green, infielder, Milwaukee Brewers
- Andrew Hallam, Best selling finance author
- Thomas Herschmiller, rower, 2004 Athens Olympics silver medallist
- Adin Hill, NHL goaltender
- John Stephen Hill, playwright, Steve Hill, When I'm 64
- Brett McLean, NHL hockey player
- Gig Morton, actor, Mr. Young
- Alice Munro, Nobel Prize-winning author
- Cam Neely, NHL hockey player
- Matt O'Donnell, offensive lineman for the Edmonton Elks
- Jonathon Power, squash player
- Cassie Sharpe, Olympic skier
- Roy Sharplin, Olympic whitewater slalom canoer
- Emily St. John Mandel, novelist and essayist
- Darcy Turenne, freeride cyclist
- Ty Wishart, NHL hockey player

== Freedom of the Town ==
The following people and military units have received the Freedom of the Town of Comox.

=== Individuals ===
- Wing commander James Francis "Stocky" Edwards CM DFC DFM CD: June 2007.
- John Marinus: August 16, 2017.
- Russ Arnott: October 5, 2022.

=== Military units ===
- HMCS Quadra
- 19 Wing Comox

== See also ==
- List of francophone communities in British Columbia
