= Darcy Turenne =

Canadian cyclist and filmmaker

Darcy Turenne (born March 22, 1984) is a professional freeride mountain bike athlete and filmmaker from Canada.

== Career ==
In 2004, she began working part-time in television on Vancouver Island, and in 2007 she became the full-time host for "Ride Guide" television, broadcast on the Outdoor Life Network in Canada, and around the world on the Extreme Sports Channel. She has also been featured as a model and feature athlete in Oakley's "Uniquely" ad campaign. While doing her master's degree, she made her first documentary film about Indonesian female action sport athletes—The Eighth Parallel—which was featured in many film festivals around the world. Since then, she has directed many commercial shorts, art, and travel films.

Darcy Turenne has been featured in many mountain bike magazines, and has also gained a lot of mainstream media attention from articles and photos in Men's Journal and Rolling Stone magazine.

She has worked intensively with Norco and its engineering team to assist in designing the women's specific freeride bike the "Vixa" as well as the women's specific "Forma" series. She also appears on the September 2009 cover of Bike Magazine, as well as many other mountain bike magazine covers around the world.

== Education ==
Darcy Turenne graduated 2002 from Highland Secondary, in Comox BC - a small town on Vancouver Island, Canada. She has a BA in Geography and Environmental Studies from the University of Victoria where she graduated in 2007. She also holds an MA in Professional Communications program with an emphasis on International and Intercultural communication from Royal Roads University.
