= Bill Reid =

Haida carver (1920–1998)

- Born: William Ronald Reid Jr. 12 January 1920; Victoria, British Columbia, Canada
- Died: 13 March 1998 (aged 78); Vancouver, British Columbia, Canada
- Occupations: sculptor, activist, environmentalist
- Works: The Spirit of Haida Gwaii; Chief of the Undersea World; The Raven and the First Men
- Awards: Order of British Columbia

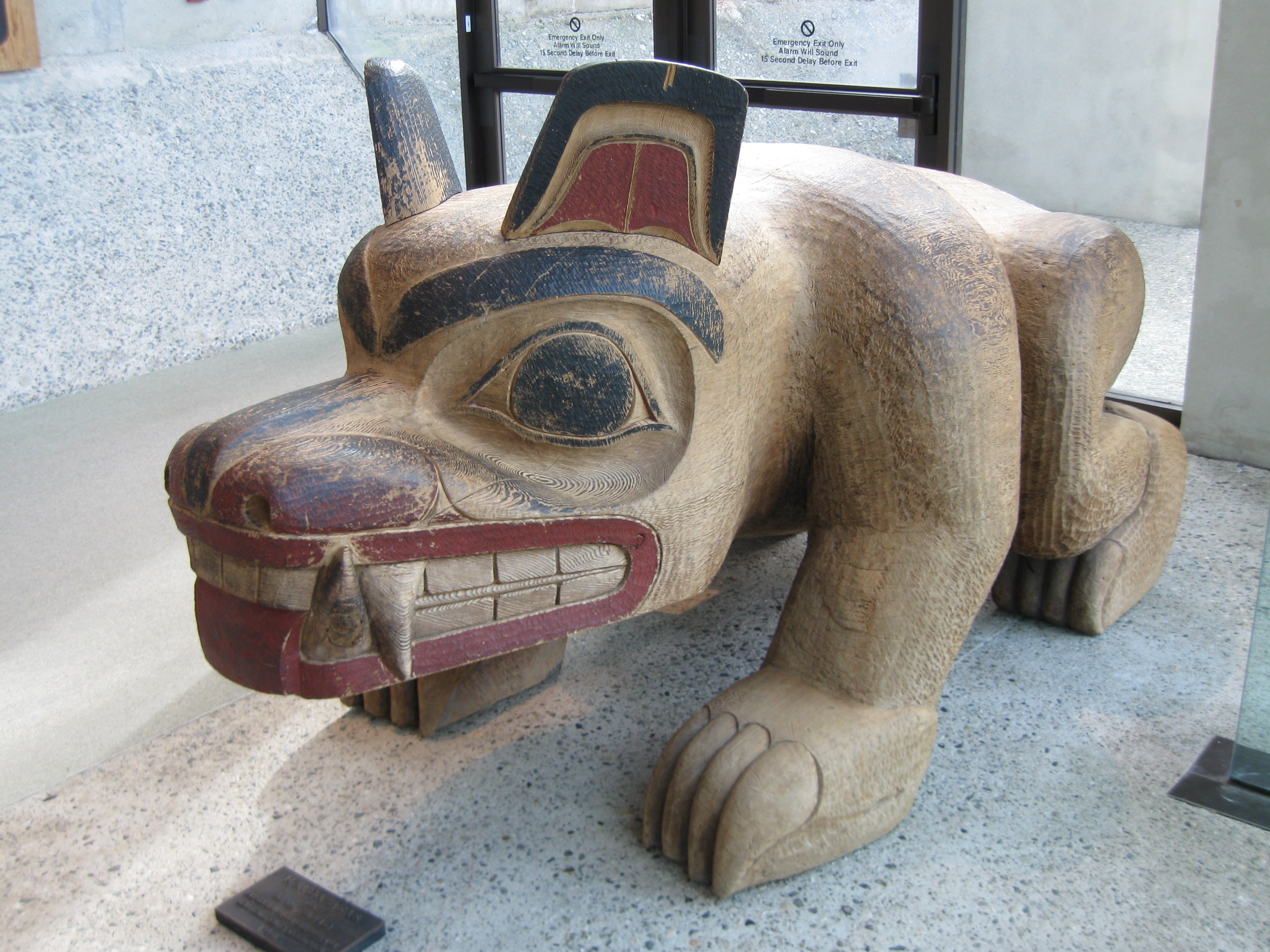
Bear Sculpture (1963). Cedar and paint

William Ronald Reid Jr. (12 January 1920 – 13 March 1998) also known as Iljuwas, was a Haida artist whose works include jewelry, sculpture, screen-printing, and paintings. Producing over one thousand original works during his fifty-year career, Reid is regarded as one of the most significant Northwest Coast artists of the late twentieth century. The Bill Reid Gallery of Northwest Coast Art celebrates his legacy through the curation of contemporary Indigenous art.

Reid was a matrilineal descendant of K'aadaas Gaa K'iigawaay, who belong to Ḵayx̱al, the Raven matrilineages of the Haida Nation. This matrilineage traces its origins to T'aanuu Llnagaay. His names are Iljuuwas (Princely One), Kihlguulins (One Who Speaks Well), and Yaahl SG̱waansing (Solitary Raven).

Some of his major works were featured on the Canadian $20 banknote of the Canadian Journey series (2004–2012).

== Biography ==
=== Early years ===
William Ronald Reid Jr., was born 12 January 1920 in Victoria, British Columbia. His father was William Ronald Reid Sr., an American of Scottish-German descent. His mother, Sophie Gladstone, was Haida, from the Raven/Wolf Clan of T'anuu (Haida: Kaadaas gaah Kiiguwaay). Gladstone, born in the Haida village of Skidegate, attended residential school in Sardis, British Columbia, and consequently did not pass on her Haida heritage to her son. Reconnecting with his Haida heritage became a driving force behind Reid's life and art.

When Reid was in his early twenties, he visited his ancestral home of Skidegate for the first time since he was an infant. He desired to connect with his relatives and his Indigenous identity, later commenting that "in turning to his ancestors, in reclaiming his heritage for himself, he was . . . looking for an identity which he had not found in modern western society." In Skidegate Reid spent time with his maternal grandfather, Charles Gladstone, a traditional Haida silversmith. Gladstone first taught Reid about Haida art, and through him, Bill inherited his tools from his great-great-uncle Charles Edenshaw, a renowned chief and artist who died the year Reid was born.

In 1944, Reid married his first wife, Mabel van Boyen. In 1948, the couple moved to Toronto, where Reid further developed his keen interest in Haida art while working as a radio announcer for CBC Radio and studying jewelry making at the Ryerson Institute of Technology. During his spare time, he made regular trips to the Royal Ontario Museum and admired the carved Haida pole installed in the main stairwell, which originated from his grandmother's village of T'aanuu. Upon completing his studies, Reid made his first Haida-inspired piece of jewelry, a bracelet resembling the ones he saw his maternal aunt wear when he was a child.

In 1951, Reid returned to Vancouver, where he eventually established a studio on Granville Island. He became greatly interested in the works of his great-great uncle Edenshaw, working to understand the symbolism of his work, much of which had been lost along with many Haida traditions. During this time Reid also worked on salvaging artifacts, including many intricately carved totem poles, which were then moldering in abandoned village sites. He assisted in the partial reconstruction of a Haida village in the University of British Columbia Museum of Anthropology (MOA). In 1986, Reid's work was featured in an exhibit at the MOA, "Beyond the Essential Form" curated by William McClennan. The exhibit catalog was later published by the University of British Columbia Press as Bill Reid: Beyond the Essential Form by Karen Duffek, Curator: Contemporary Visual Arts & Pacific Northwest.

Working in the traditional forms and modern media (usually gold, silver and argillite), Reid began by making jewellery. He gradually explored larger sculptures in bronze, red cedar and Nootka Cypress (yellow cedar), usually portraying figures, animals, and scenes from Haida mythology. He intended to express his ancestors' visual traditions into a contemporary form.

=== Major works and awards ===
Reid's most popular works are three large bronze sculptures. Two depict a canoe filled with human and animal figures: one black, The Spirit of Haida Gwaii, is at the Canadian Embassy, Washington, D.C., in the United States; and one green, The Jade Canoe, is at Vancouver International Airport, in British Columbia. The third sculpture, Chief of the Undersea World, depicts a breaching orca and is installed at the Vancouver Aquarium. Plaster casts of these sculptures are held by the Canadian Museum of History in Gatineau, Canada.

His 1965 painting Smallpox is exhibited at the Canadian Museum of History. Reid's Raven and the First Men carving based on the Haida legend was unveiled at the University of British Columbia Museum of Anthropology (MOA) in April 1986.

In 1975, a dialog between Reid and art historian, Bill Holm in conjunction with a Northwest Coast Indian art exhibition, organized by the Institute for the Arts, Rice University, Houston was published as Form and Freedom: A Dialogue on Northwest Coast Indian Art.

== Legacy and honours ==
Reid received many honours in his life, including honorary degrees from the University of British Columbia, the University of Toronto, the University of Victoria, the University of Western Ontario, York University, and Trent University. He received the National Aboriginal Achievement Award for Lifetime Achievement in 1994, and was made a member of the Order of British Columbia and an Officer of France's Order of Arts and Letters. He was made a member of the Royal Canadian Academy of Arts.

On 30 April 1996 Canada Post issued 'The Spirit of Haida Gwaii, 1986–1991, Bill Reid' in the Masterpieces of Canadian art series. The stamp was designed by Pierre-Yves Pelletier based on the sculpture The Spirit of Haida Gwaii (1991) by William Ronald Reid in the Canadian Embassy, Washington, United States. The 90¢ stamps are perforated 12.5 x 13 and were printed by Ashton-Potter Limited.

Two of his sculptures, The Raven and the First Men and Spirit of Haida Gwaii, are prominently featured on the $20 note in the Bank of Canada's new Canadian Journey (2004) issue, paired with a quotation from author Gabrielle Roy.

He was the subject of Alanis Obomsawin's 2022 documentary film Bill Reid Remembers.

=== Later years ===
Reid participated in the Haida-led blockades of logging roads that helped save the rain forests of Gwaii Haanas (South Moresby). He stopped work on the sculpture in Washington during this period to protest the destruction of the forests of Haida Gwaii, then known as the Queen Charlotte Islands. In 1981, he married Martine de Widerspach-Thor (Mormanne), a French anthropologist.

Reid died on 13 March 1998, of Parkinson's disease, in Vancouver. In July 1998 friends and relatives paddled Lootaas, a large cedar canoe carved by Reid for Expo 86, on a two-day journey along the Pacific coast to bring his ashes to Tanu Island in Haida Gwaii, the site of his mother's village of New Clew.

== Gallery ==
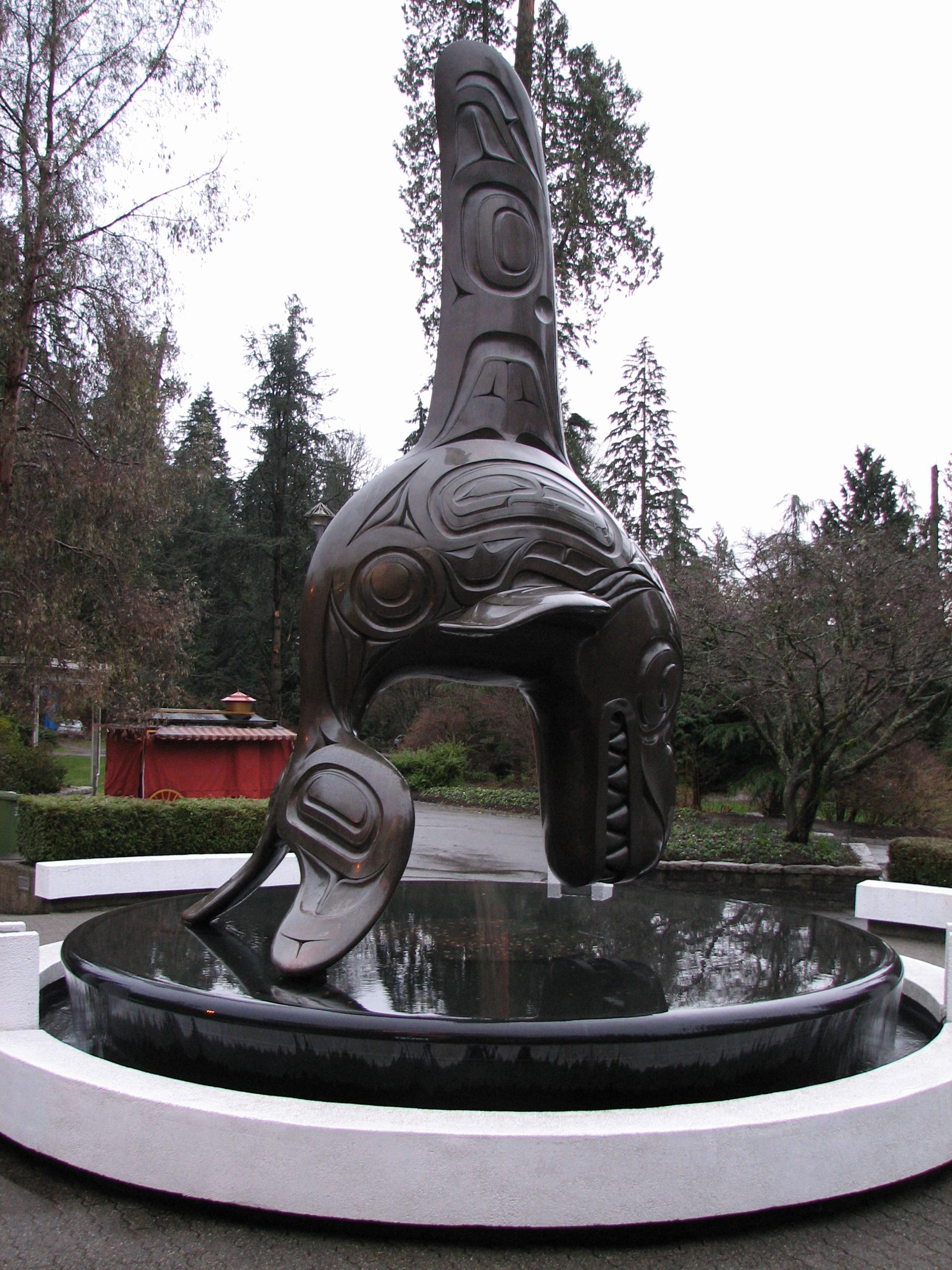
Chief of the Undersea World, Vancouver Aquarium

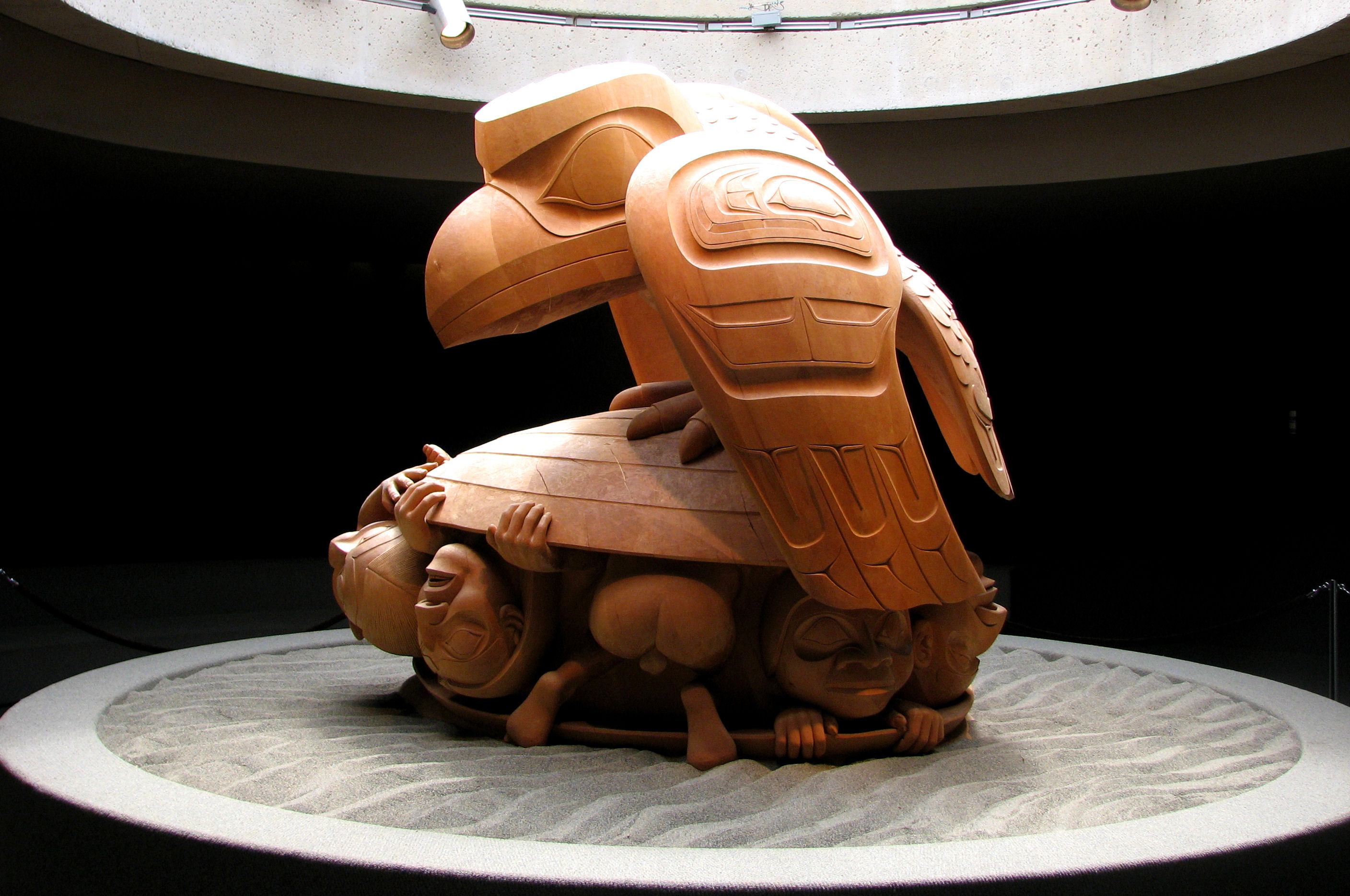
The Raven and the First Men, UBC Museum of Anthropology. It depicts part of a Haida creation myth. The Raven represents the Trickster figure common to many mythologies.

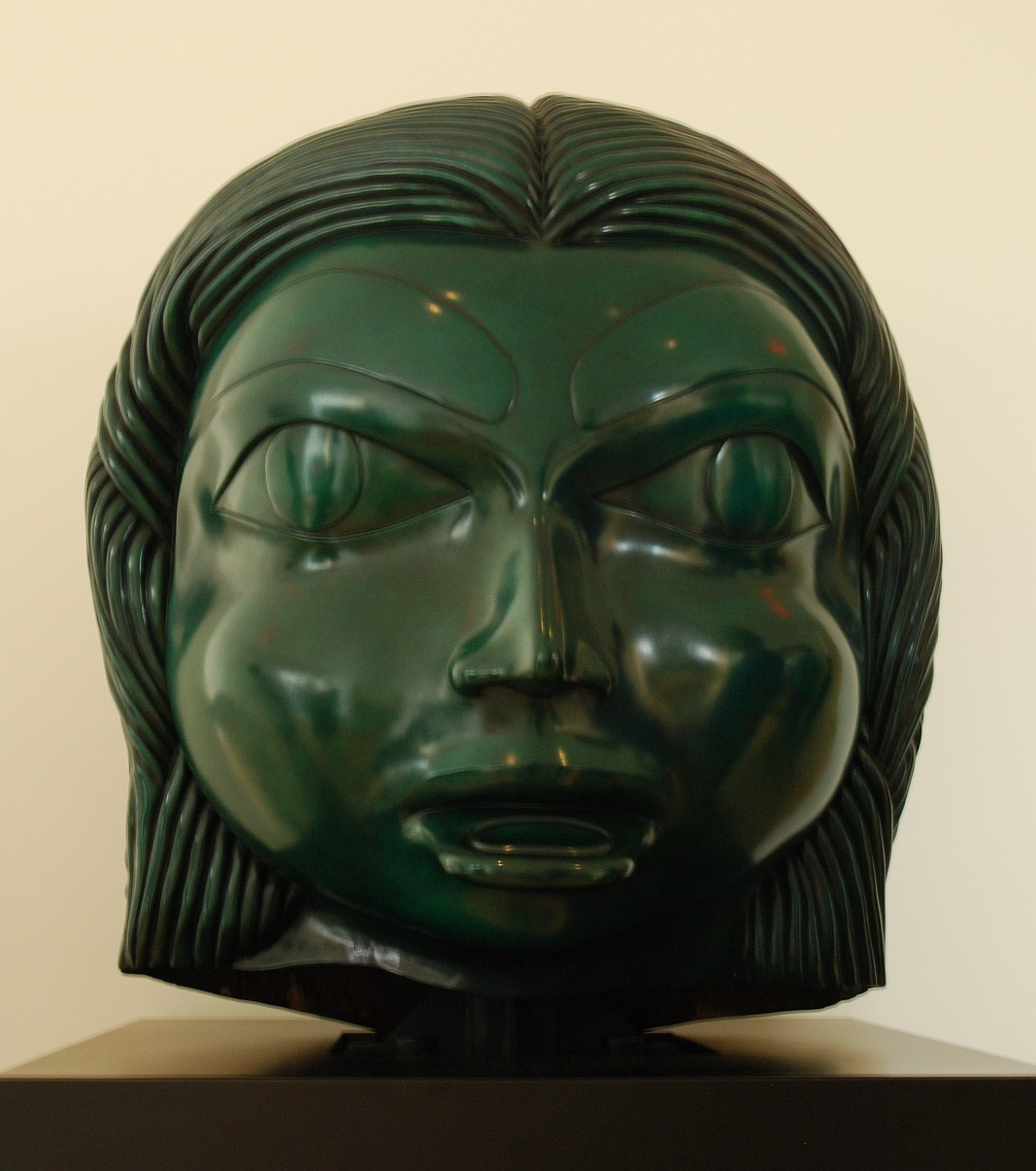
Bear Mother, Delegation of the Ismaili Imamat, Ottawa, Ontario

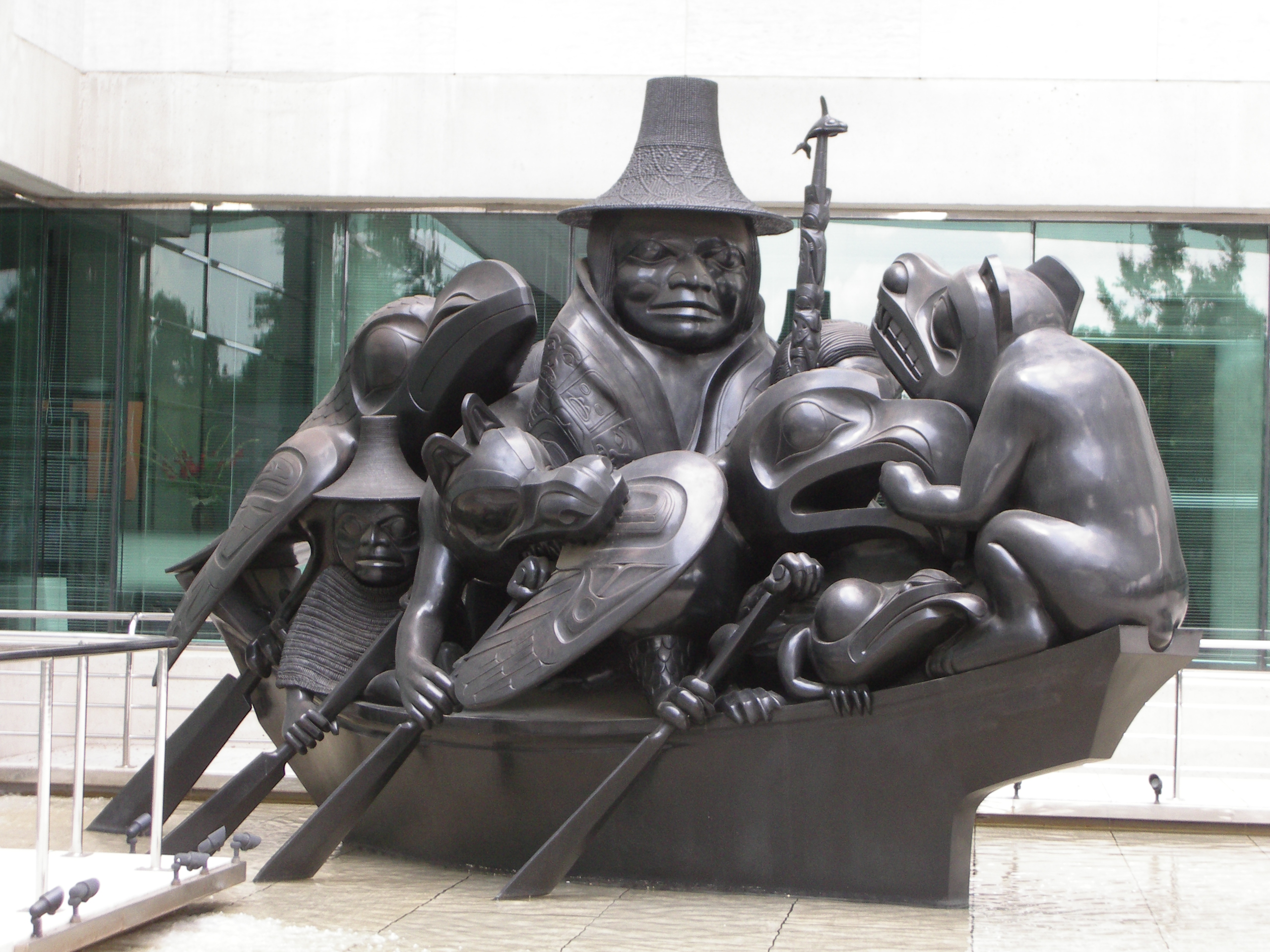
The Spirit of Haida Gwaii (The Black Canoe), Canadian Embassy, Washington, D.C., USA

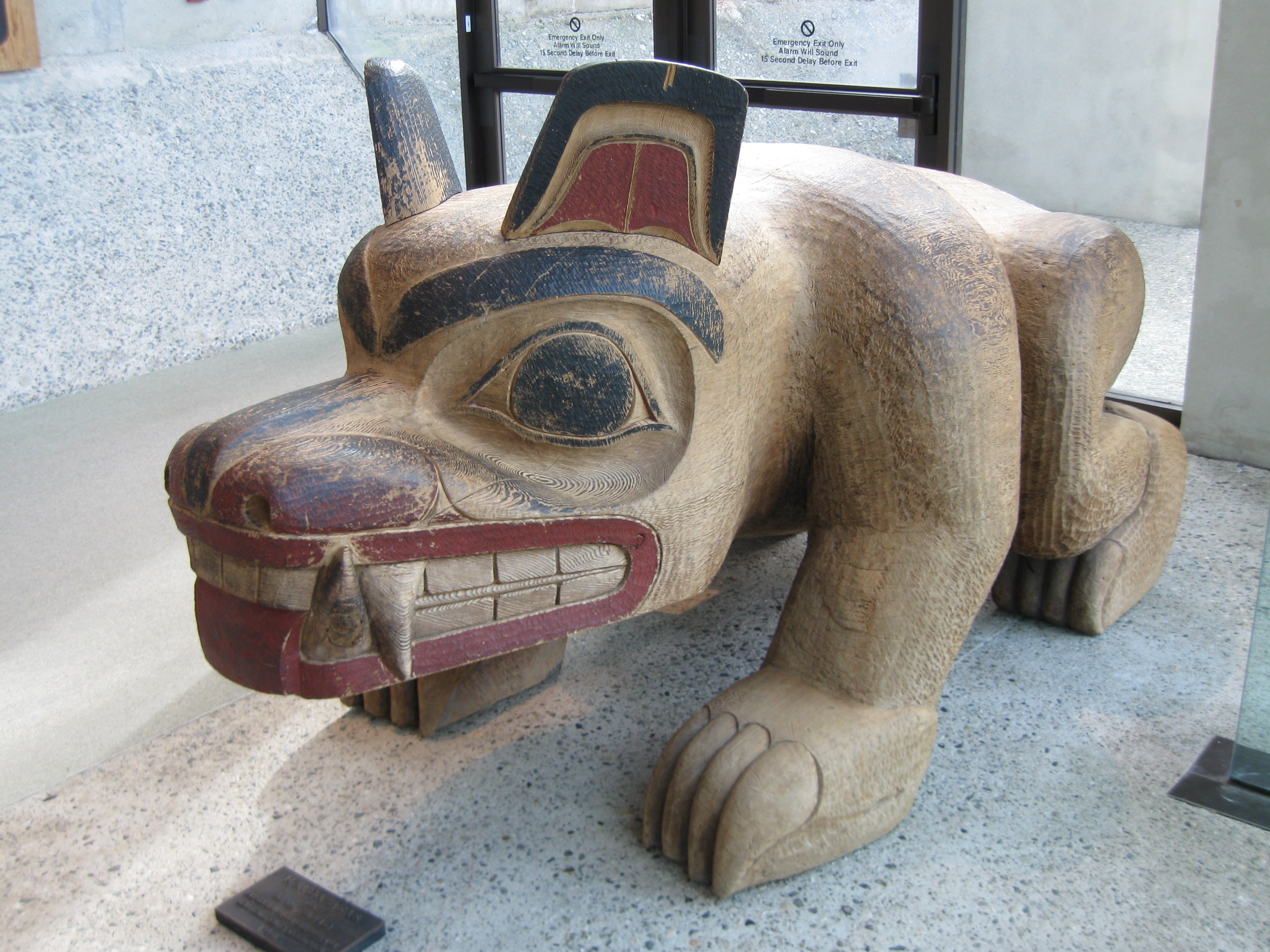
Bear, UBC Museum of Anthropology

== See also ==
- Notable Aboriginal people of Canada
- List of indigenous artists of the Americas
