= 1977 Governor General's Awards =

Canadian literary award

Each winner of the 1977 Governor General's Awards for Literary Merit was selected by a panel of judges administered by the Canada Council for the Arts.

== Winners ==
=== English Language ===
- Fiction: Timothy Findley, The Wars.
- Poetry or Drama: D. G. Jones, Under the Thunder the Flowers Light Up the Earth.
- Non-Fiction: Frank Scott, Essays on the Constitution.

=== French Language ===
- Fiction: Gabrielle Roy, Ces enfants de ma vie
- Poetry or Drama: Michel Garneau, Les célébrations and Adidou Adidouce.
- Non-Fiction: Denis Monière, Le développement des idéologies au Québec des origines à nos jours.
