= Walter J. Phillips =

English-born Canadian painter and printmaker

Walter Joseph Phillips
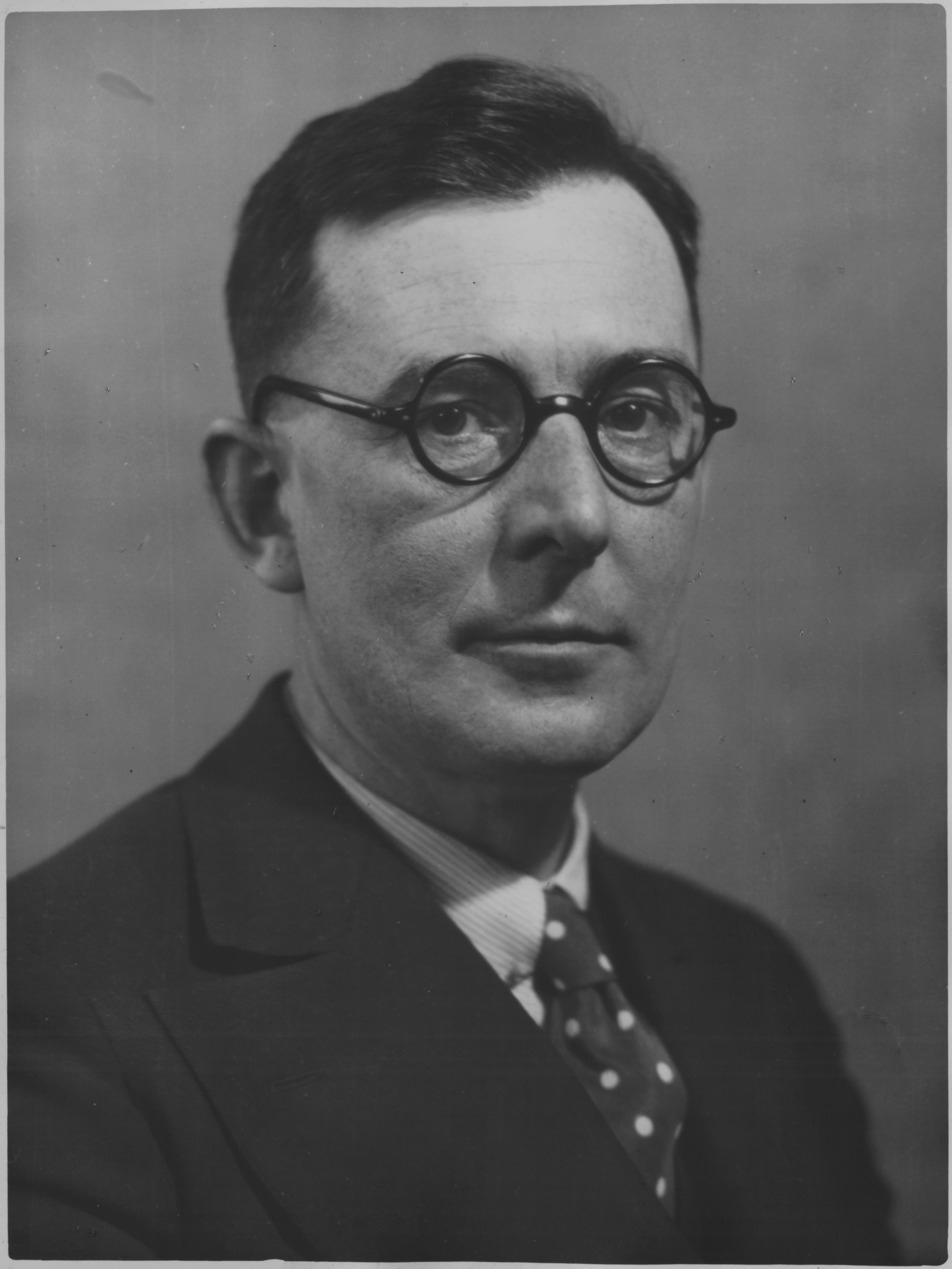
- Phillips in 1930
- Born: October 25, 1884; Barton-upon-Humber, Lincolnshire, England
- Died: July 5, 1963 (aged 78); Victoria, British Columbia, Canada
- Education: Birmingham School of Art (1899–1902) with Edward R. Taylor
- Known for: painter woodcutter, printmaker; teacher, especially at the Banff School of Fine Art (1940–59)

Walter Joseph Phillips RCA (October 25, 1884 – July 5, 1963) was an English-born Canadian painter and printmaker. He is credited with popularizing the colour woodcut in the style of the Japanese, in Canada.

== Life ==
Phillips was born in Barton-upon-Humber, Lincolnshire, England. As a youth, he studied at the Birmingham School of Art. After studying abroad in South Africa and Paris, he worked as a commercial artist in England. In June 1913 he moved to Winnipeg, Manitoba, where he lived for more than 28 years. He first traveled to British Columbia in 1927. Phillips died in Victoria, British Columbia, in 1963.

== Career ==
Phillips is famous for his woodcuts and watercolour sketches. His artistic career spanned from the 1900s through the 1940s, during which time his work was exhibited throughout North America and Great Britain. Common subjects for Phillips included the lakes of Manitoba—York Boat on Lake Winnipeg (1930) is a well-known print—the prairies, and in his later years, the Rocky Mountains, where his ashes were scattered.

In 1940 he was asked to become a resident artist at the Banff Centre, then known as the Banff School of Fine Arts, where he played an important role in the development of their visual arts program. Its Walter Phillips Gallery, which focuses on contemporary art, is named after him. The Glenbow Museum in Calgary, Alberta holds an extensive collection of Phillips works and a research archive.

In 1933, he was made a member of the Royal Canadian Academy of Arts. He was a member of the Canadian Painters Etchers Society; the Manitoba Society of Artists; the Society of Gravers-Painters in Colour, London, England; and the Society of Print Makers of California.

== Recognition ==
On 17 February 1997 Canada Post issued 'York Boat on Lake Winnipeg, 1930, Walter J. Phillips' in the Masterpieces of Canadian art series. The stamp was designed by Pierre-Yves Pelletier based on a woodcut "York Boat on Lake Winnipeg" (1930) by Walter Joseph Phillips in the National Gallery of Canada. The 90¢ stamps were printed by Ashton-Potter Limited.

An exhibition of Phillips’ woodcuts was held at the McMichael Gallery in 2020.

== Record Sale Prices ==
On May 26, 2010, Phillips' print "Summer Idyll" reached US$30,109 at auction by Heffel Fine Art. In Heffel spring sale 2026, lot 101, Karlukwees, BC, colour woodcut on paper, 1929, 10 1/4 x 12 1/2 in, 26 x 31.8 cm, Estimate: $25,000 - $35,000 CAD sold for $67,250 (including buyer's premium).
