= Maison Gabrielle-Roy =

Coordinates: 49.8900°N 97.1115°W

La Maison Gabrielle Roy
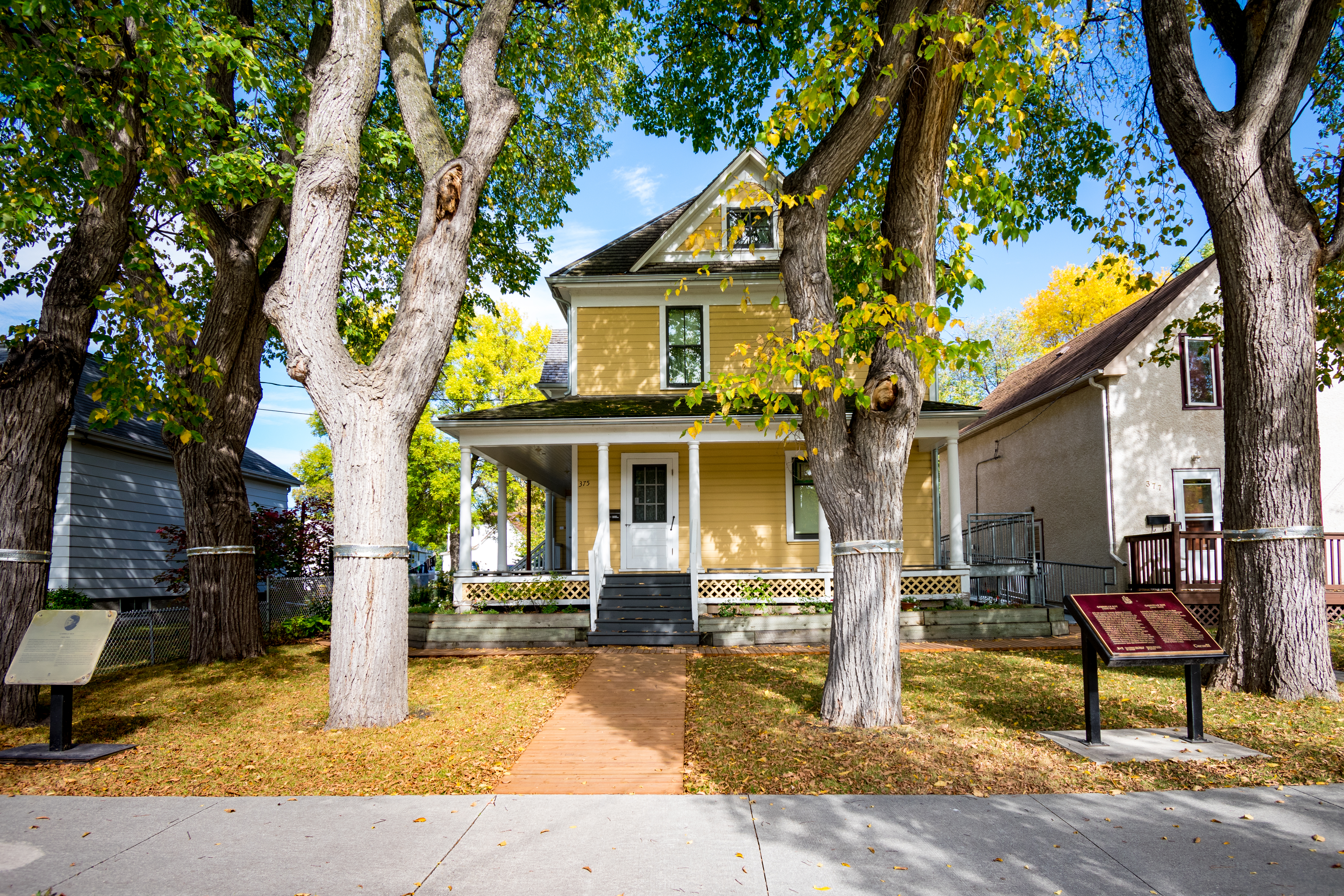
- Established: 2003
- Location: 375, rue Deschambault; St. Boniface, Manitoba; R2H 3B4
- Type: historical house museum
- Public transit access: 10 St. Boniface - Provencher
- Website: La Maison Gabrielle Roy

National Historic Site of Canada
- Official name: Maison Gabrielle-Roy National Historic Site of Canada
- Designated: 2008

Provincial Heritage Site
- Official name: Gabrielle Roy House
- Designation: Provincial Heritage Site
- Recognized: January 31, 2001
- CRHP listing: January 31, 2008
- Recognition authority: Province of Manitoba
- ID: 8694

Municipally Designated Site
- Official name: Maison Roy
- Designation: Winnipeg Landmark Heritage Structure
- Recognized: June 7, 1982
- CRHP listing: January 31, 2008
- Recognition authority: City of Winnipeg
- ID: 8698

The Maison Gabrielle Roy (or Maison Roy)—translated in English as the House of Gabrielle Roy (or Roy House)—is a museum in the former home of writer Gabrielle Roy. The house is located in the Saint Boniface area of Winnipeg, Manitoba, Canada. The objective of the museum is to disseminate the works of Roy and to preserve a piece of heritage for Canadian history.

From 1909 to 1937, Roy lived in the heart of Saint Boniface. The house was restored and opened to the public in 2003. The site was designated a National Historic Site of Canada in 2008.

The Museum is open year round and offers services in English or French. It is affiliated with: CMA, CHIN, and Virtual Museum of Canada.

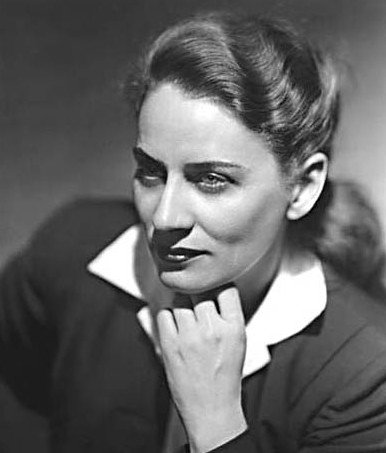
Gabrielle Roy 1945
