= The Raven and the First Men =

1978-80 sculpture by Bill Reid

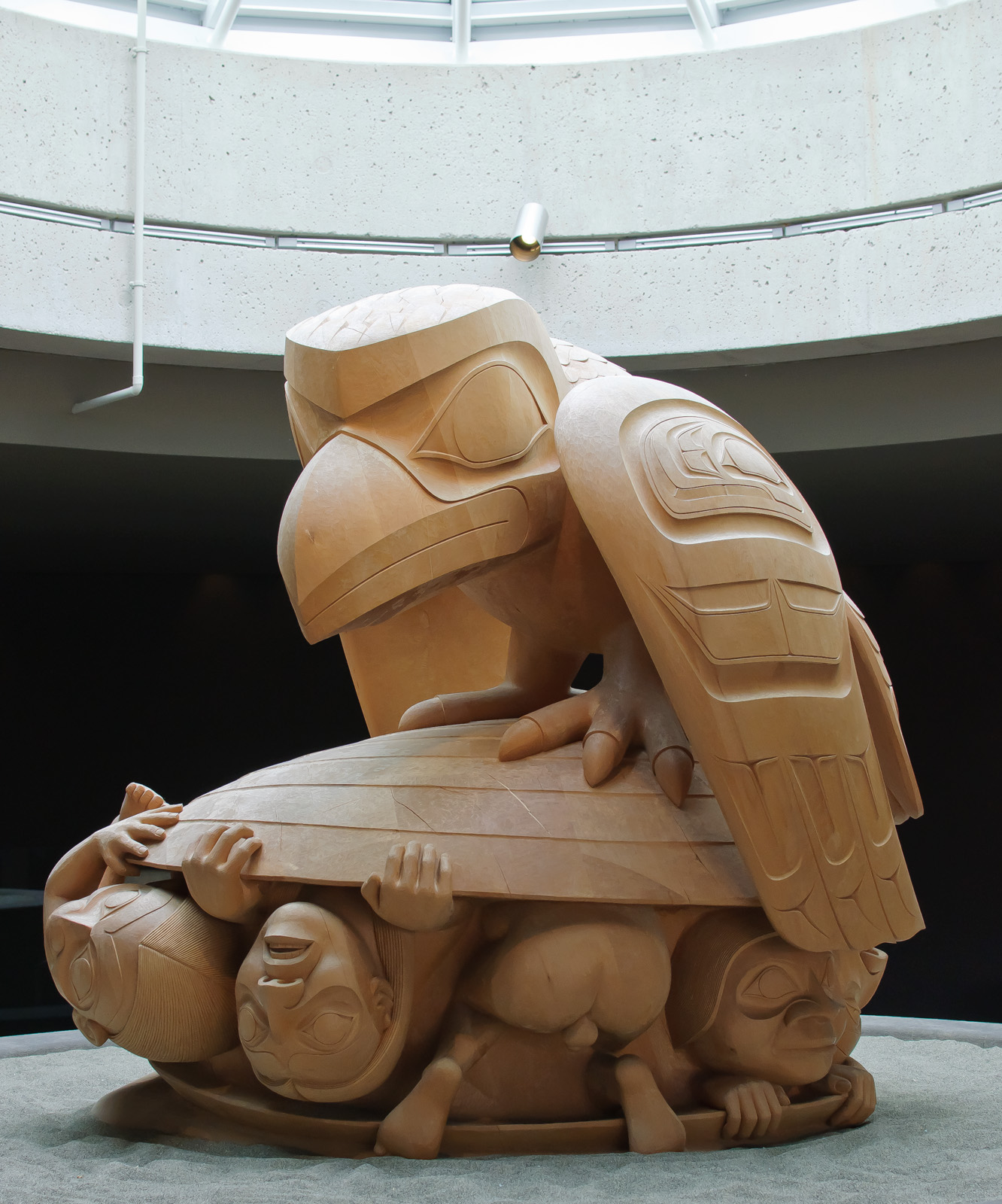
- Artist: Bill Reid
- Year: 1978
- Type: Laminated yellow cedar
- Dimensions: 1.88 m × 1.92 m (74 in × 76 in)
- Location: Museum of Anthropology at UBC, Vancouver; 49.269366°N 123.259596°W

The Raven and the First Men is a sculpture by Haida artist Bill Reid. It depicts the Haida creation myth. It was carved from a single block of laminated yellow cedar, beginning in the fall of 1978, and took two years to complete, with work completing on April 1, 1980. Raven and the First Men is depicted on the reverse of the former Canadian twenty dollar bill of the Canadian Journey series.

== Background ==
Raven and the First Men depicts the creation myth of the Haida people. According to the myth, the Raven, the Haida Trickster, wound up on Haida Gwaii's Rose Spit Beach. He was alerted by some sounds to a large clamshell that had little creatures dwelling inside, reluctant to emerge from their shell. With some coaxing from Raven using his beak, and their curiosity about the outside world, the beings emerged from the clamshell to become the first Haida people.

Raven came to realize that the beings that emerged were only men. He grew bored of seeing them play and exploring the world. Raven attempted to find women for the men within the clam. Finding a chiton, he opened one up and found little women living within them. He brought the women to the men, and enjoyed watching them and their behavior. They began to elope and move across to the other parts of the island. Raven never grew bored again with the humans and their families around.

== Creation ==
While living in Montreal, Reid began the sculpture with a miniature carving made of boxwood. The piece was inspired by the works of Haida artist Charles Edenshaw. The piece was entitled The Raven Discovering Mankind in a Clamshell, and was carved in 1970. Businessman Walter Koerner noticed the miniature and commissioned Reid to create a larger version for the Museum of Anthropology at the University of British Columbia. Reid travelled from Montreal to Vancouver in 1972 to start the commission. Another scale version of the sculpture made in onyx exists and both carvings are held in the Bill Reid Gallery of Northwest Coast Art. A miniature cast in gold was later auctioned off in 2005 for over $100,000.

Work proved difficult, as a singular block of red cedar log was difficult to find without imperfection. 2.1 meter blocks were difficult to find because of the presence of rot and defects. A donation by Rayonier Canada of multiple yellow cedar beams which were laminated together with the assistance of Koppers International became the final medium for the sculpture.

Carving began in the fall of 1978, the initial roughing of the shape was done with the assistance of Gidansda Guujaaw and George A. Norris. The men within the clamshell were carved by George Rammell and the final tool finishing being done by Reg Davidson and Jim Hart.

== Reception ==
Charles, Prince of Wales unveiled the Raven and the First Men on April 1, 1980. The sculpture was celebrated by the Haida people and their guests on June 5, 1980.

It has since become a popular attraction to the visitors of the museum. Raven and the First Men was featured on the Canadian twenty-dollar bill in the Canadian Journey series of bills from 2004 to 2011. Reception has been positive, with one critic remarking that Reid combines European sculpture tradition with native Haida art.

Many experience delight while others are awed by the hovering supernatural Raven. Their responses affirm the power of Northwest Coast art to touch the emotions of people from different cultures.

— Karen Duffek, Bill Reid: Beyond the Essential Form (1986)

== Gallery ==
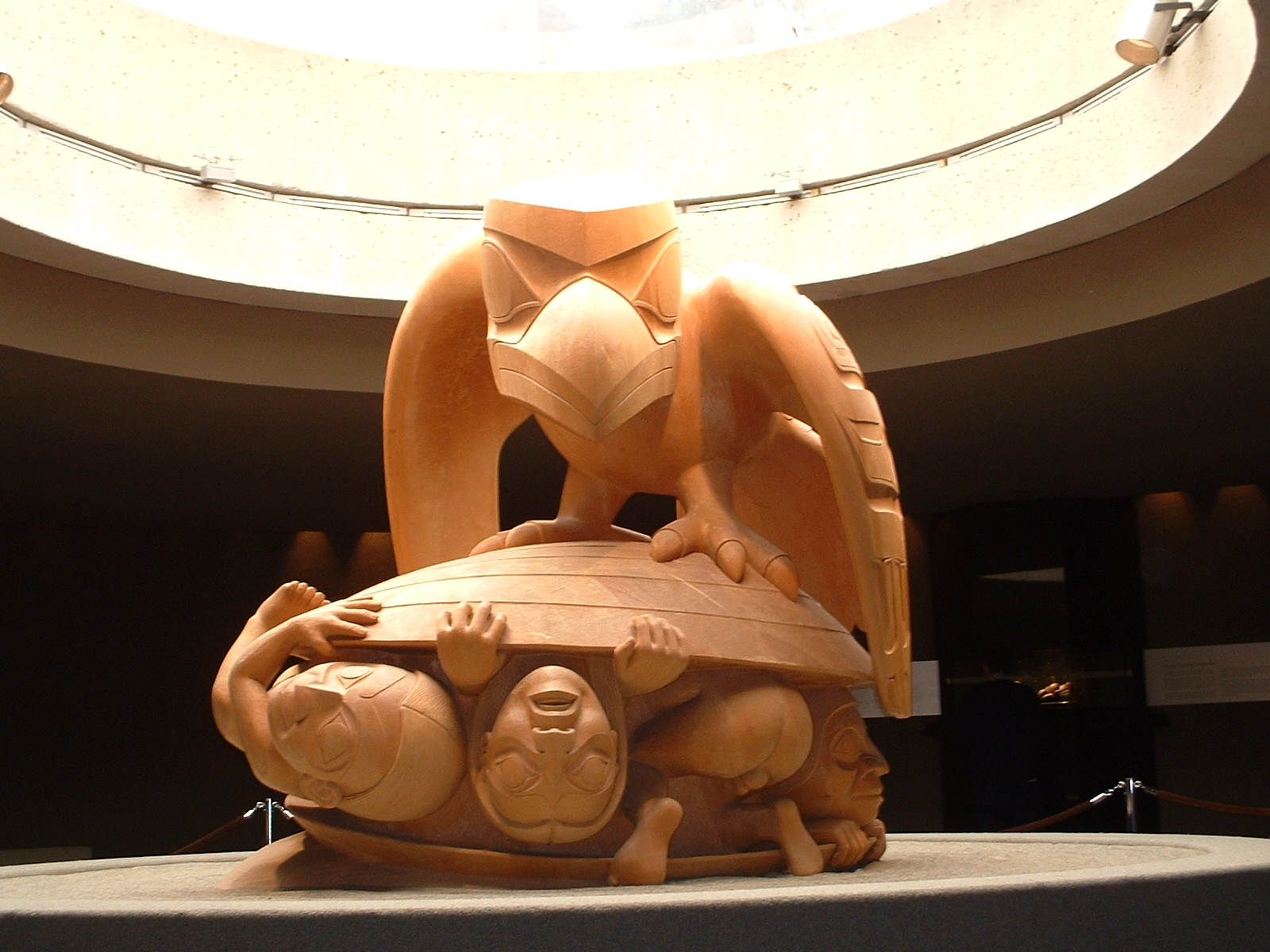
Front view

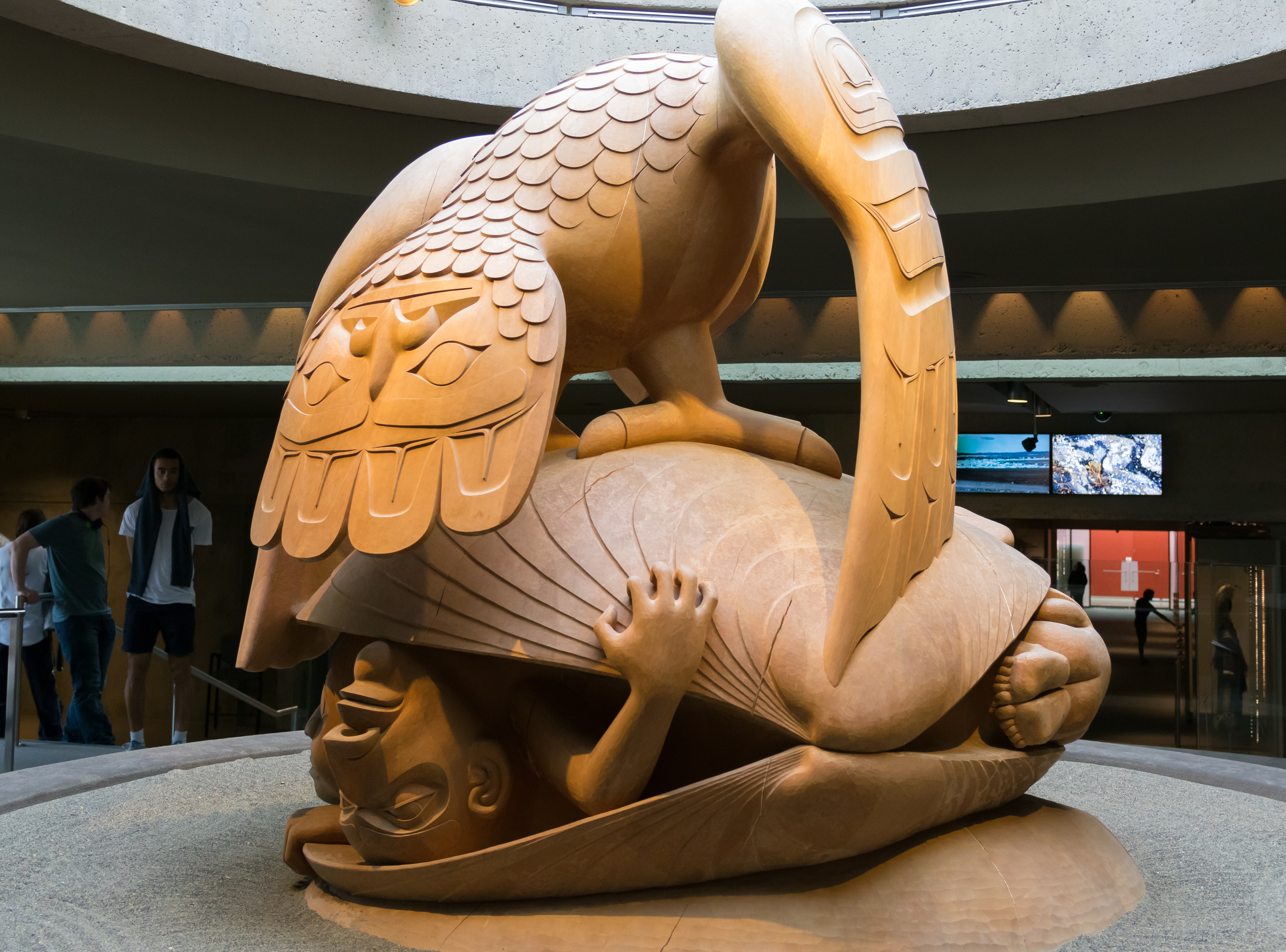
Back view

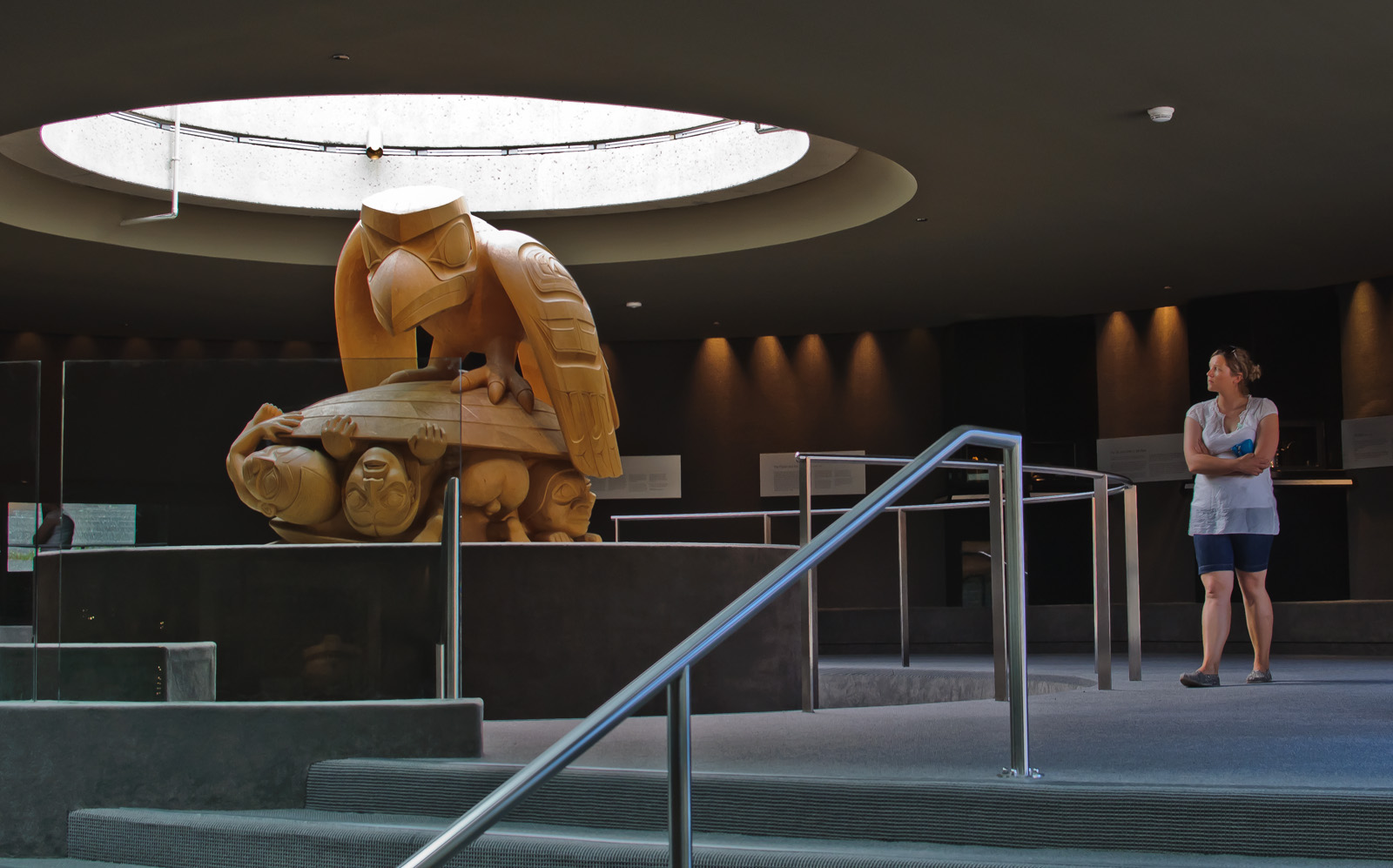
Within the rotunda of the Museum of Anthropology
