= Spirit of Haida Gwaii =

Sculpture by Bill Reid

Spirit of Haida Gwaii: The Black Canoe
- outside the Canadian Embassy in Washington, D.C. Photo: Bengt Oberger
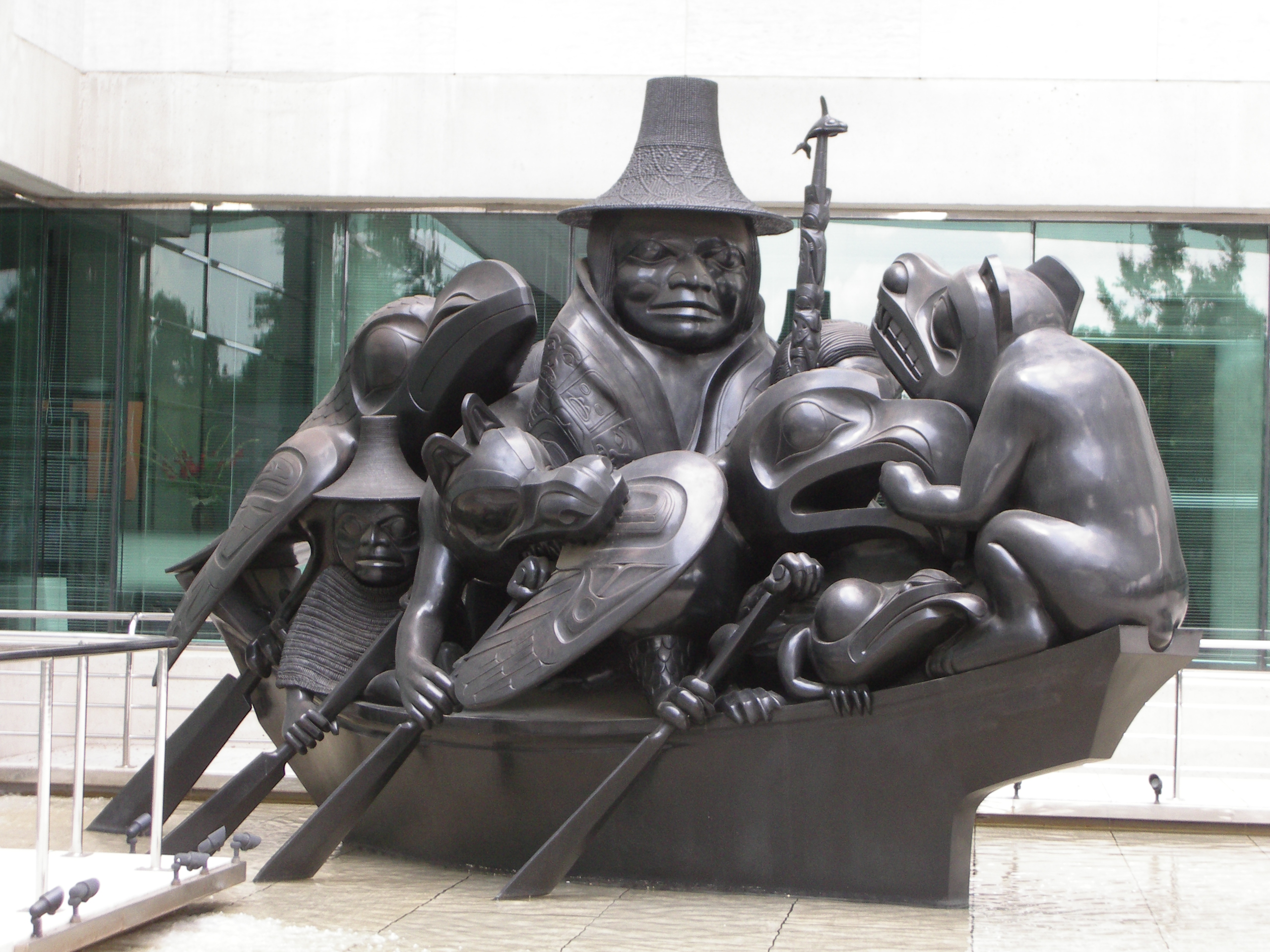
- Artist: Bill Reid
- Year: 1986
- Type: Bronze, plaster
- Dimensions: 3.89 m × 3.48 m × 6.05 m (12 ft 9 in × 11 ft 5 in × 19 ft 10 in)
- Location: Canadian Museum of History, Washington, D.C. and Vancouver; 38.893056°N 77.018333°W

Spirit of Haida Gwaii is a sculpture by British Columbia Haida artist Bill Reid (1920–1998). There are three versions of it: the black canoe, the jade canoe, and a full-sized plaster original. The black canoe features on Canadian $20 bills of the Canadian Journey series issued between 2004 and 2012.

== Background ==
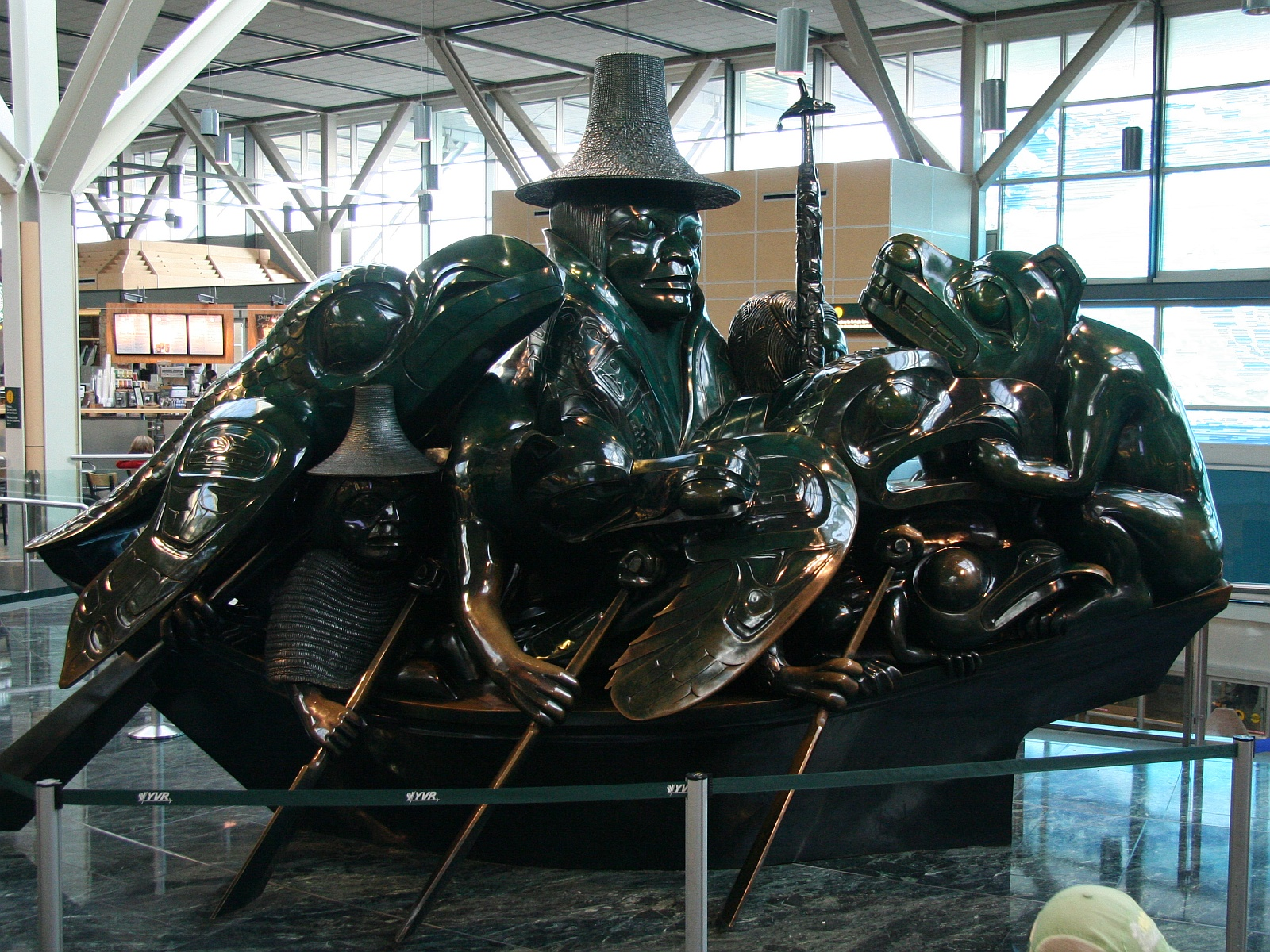
Spirit of Haida Gwaii: The Jade Canoe, inside Vancouver International Airport

The sculpture was originally created in 1986 as a 1/6-scale clay model, enlarged in 1988, to full-size clay. In 1991, the model was cast in bronze. This first bronze casting was entitled Spirit of Haida Gwaii: The Black Canoe and is now displayed outside the Canadian Embassy in Washington, D.C. The second bronze casting, entitled Spirit of Haida Gwaii: The Jade Canoe, was first displayed at the Canadian Museum of History in 1994. Finally, in 1996, the Jade Canoe (as it is generally called) was moved to the International Terminal at Vancouver International Airport.

The original plaster pattern for the sculpture is on display in the main hall of the Canadian Museum of History.

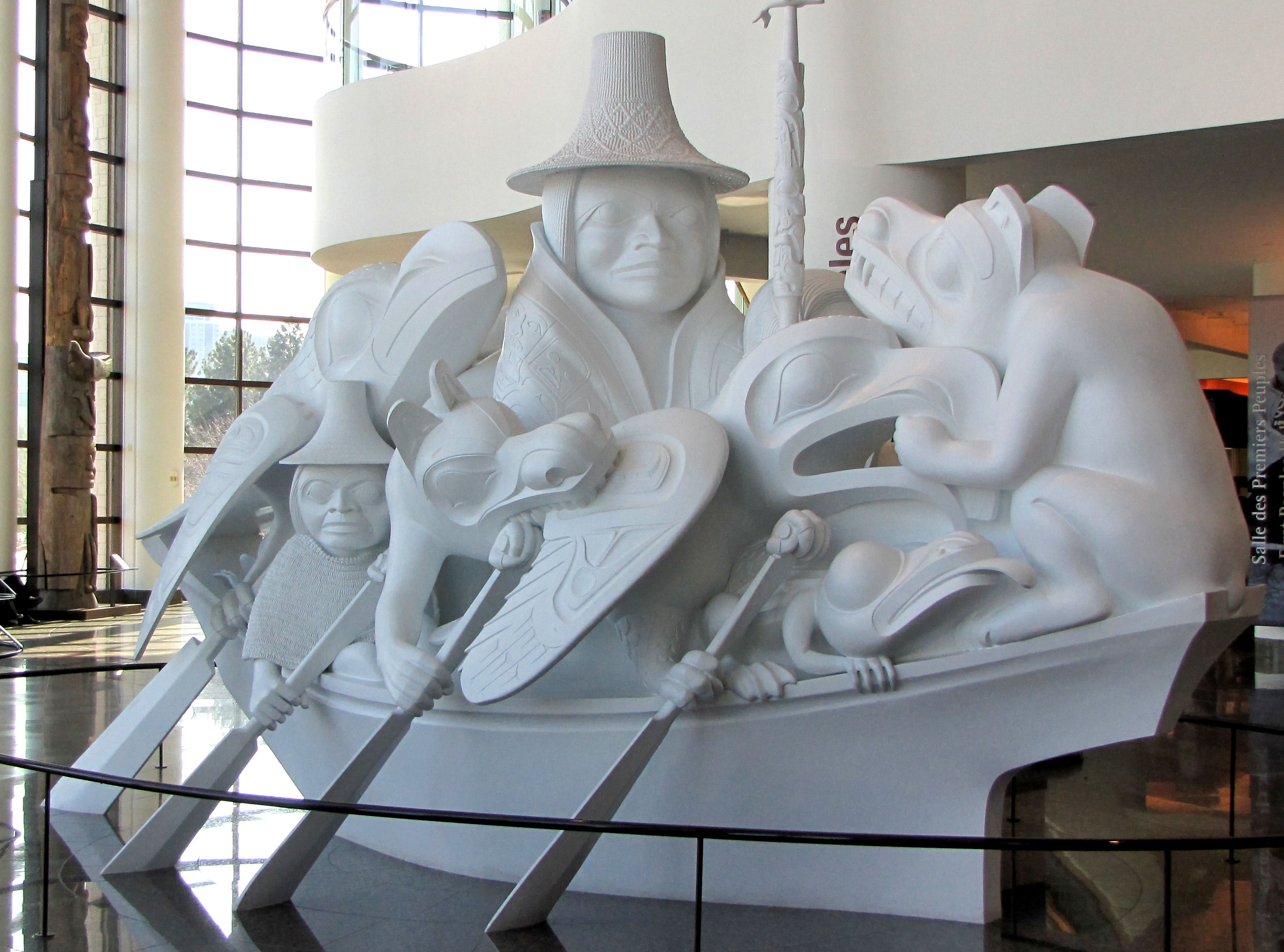
Full-sized plaster original at Canadian Museum of History

On 30 April 1996 Canada Post issued The Spirit of Haida Gwaii, 1986–1991, Bill Reid in the Masterpieces of Canadian art series. The stamp was designed by Pierre-Yves Pelletier based on a sculpture Spirit of Haida Gwaii (1991) by Bill Reid in the Canadian Embassy, Washington, United States. The 90¢ stamps are perforated 12.5 mm × 13 mm and were printed by Ashton-Potter Limited.

An image of the sculpture features prominently on the reverse of the 2004 edition of the Canadian twenty-dollar bill. These bills are no longer issued; a new design entered use in 2012.

== Sculpture ==
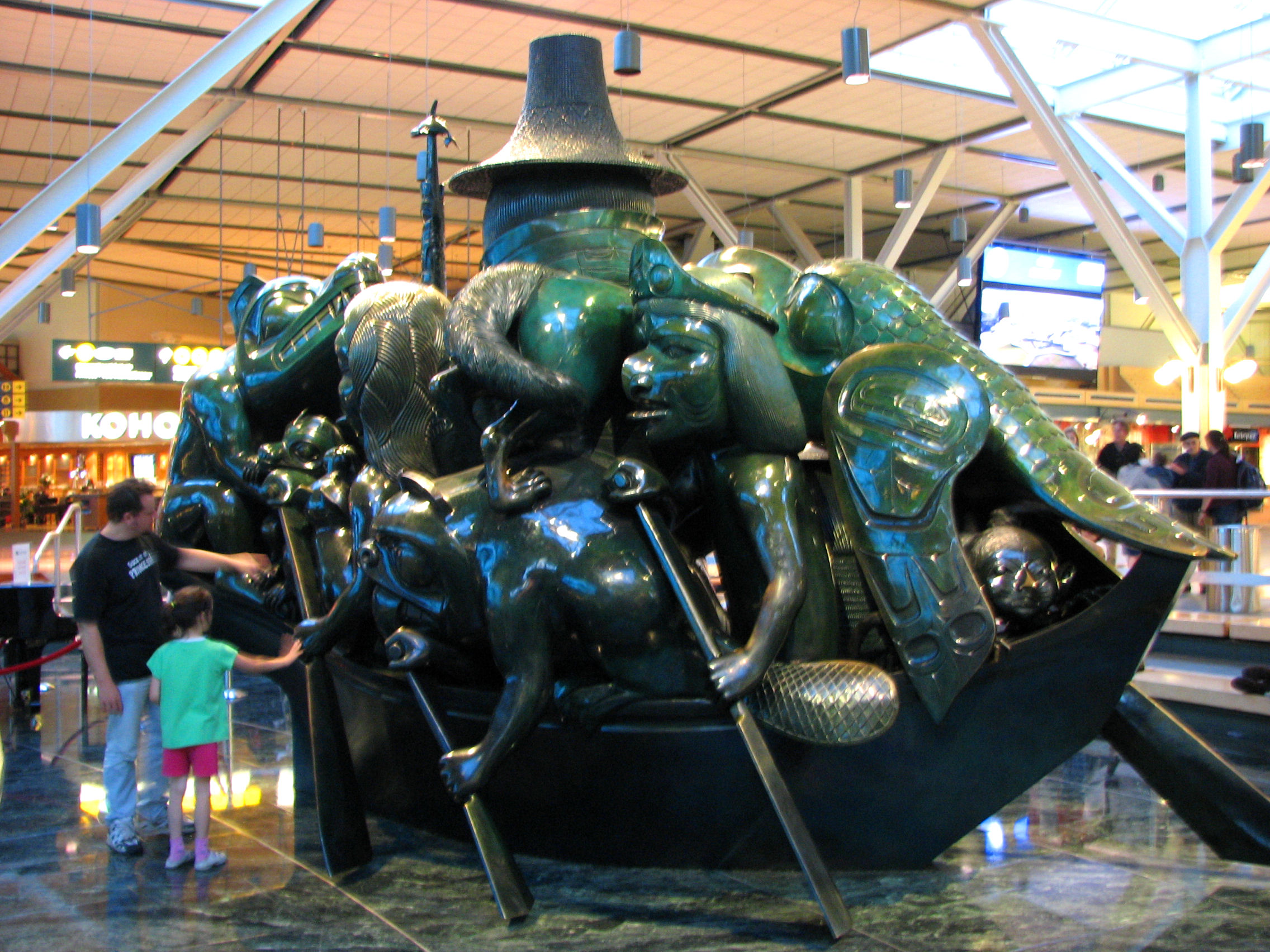
Port side of The Jade Canoe

Spirit of Haida Gwaii is intended to represent the Aboriginal heritage of Haida Gwaii, formerly called the Queen Charlotte Islands. In green-coloured bronze on the Vancouver version and black-coloured on the Washington version, it shows a traditional Haida cedar dugout canoe which totals six metres in length. The canoe carries the following passengers: Raven, the traditional trickster of Haida mythology, holding the steering oar; Mouse Woman, crouched under Raven's tail; Grizzly Bear, sitting at the bow and staring toward Raven; Bear Mother, Grizzly's human wife; their cubs, Good Bear (ears pointed forward) and Bad Bear (ears pointed back); Beaver, Raven's uncle; Dogfish Woman; Eagle; Frog; Wolf, claws imbedded in Beaver's back and teeth in Eagle's wing; a small human paddler in Haida garb known as the Ancient Reluctant Conscript; and, at the sculpture's focal point, the human Shaman (or Kilstlaai in Haida), who wears the Haida cloak and woven spruce root hat and holds a tall staff carved with images of Seabear, Raven, and Killer Whale.

Consistent with Haida tradition, the significance of the passengers is highly symbolic. The variety and interdependence of the canoe's occupants represents the natural environment on which the ancient Haida relied for their very survival: the passengers are diverse, and not always in harmony, yet they must depend on one another to live. The fact that the cunning trickster, Raven, holds the steering oar is likely symbolic of nature's unpredictability. The sculpture is 6 metres (20 ft) long, not quite 4 metres (13 ft) from the base to the top of the Shaman's staff, and weighs nearly 5,000 kilograms (11,000 lb).
