= Matthew Josephson =

American historian and biographer (1899–1978)

- Born: February 15, 1899; Brooklyn, New York
- Died: March 13, 1978 (aged 79); Santa Cruz, California
- Education: Columbia University (BA)
- Occupations: Historian, biographer, journalist
- Known for: The Robber Barons (1934)
- Spouse: Hannah Josephson

Matthew Josephson (February 15, 1899 – March 13, 1978) was an American historian, biographer and journalist. He authored works on French novelists of the 19th century, and on U.S. political and economic history of the 19th and early 20th centuries. He popularized the term "robber baron" in his best-selling 1934 book The Robber Barons about the first American tycoons.

== Biography ==
He was born in Brooklyn, New York on February 15, 1899, to Jewish immigrant parents Julius and Sarah (née Kasindorf) Josephson. His father was from Iasi, Romania and his mother from Rostov-na-Donu, Russia. Julius Josephson was a successful printer who became a bank vice president before his death in 1925.

Matthew graduated from Columbia University in 1920 and married Hannah Geffen. They lived in Europe in the 1920s. His wife, librarian of the American Academy of Arts and Letters and an author in her own right, worked closely with her husband on various projects throughout their careers. In 1945, she and Malcolm Cowley edited Aragon, Poet of the Resistance. Matthew and Hannah Josephson collaborated on Al Smith: Hero of the Cities (1969). They had two sons, Eric and Carl.

In the 1920s, Josephson immersed himself in literature and the arts. He became "an advocate of Dada and art for art's sake". He published a collection of experimental poetry, Galimathias (1923). He edited Broom: An International Magazine of the Arts (1922–1924), and later contributed to the transition literary journal. He wrote his first biography of a novelist, Zola and His Time, in 1928. The biography was credited with providing source material for the Oscar-winning film, The Life of Emile Zola (1937).

The onset of the Great Depression changed Josephson's focus from literature to politics and history. He edited The New Republic from 1931 to 1932. He had articles appear in The Nation, The New Yorker, and The Saturday Evening Post. He published a biography of Jean-Jacques Rousseau in 1932. Influenced by economic historian Charles A. Beard, Josephson wrote his most successful book, The Robber Barons (1934), which he dedicated to Charles and Mary Beard. The book quickly made the best-seller list and secured Josephson's national reputation. He followed it with more full-length works of a political nature including The Politicos in 1938, in which Josephson served—along with writers such as Edmund Wilson, Theodore Dreiser, and Malcolm Cowley—as a spokesman for left-leaning intellectuals who were dissatisfied with the social and political status quo.

Josephson wrote two memoirs, Life Among the Surrealists (1962) and Infidel in the Temple (1967). He died on March 13, 1978, at the Community Hospital in Santa Cruz, California.

== Legacy ==
Josephson's papers are kept at the Beinecke Rare Book and Manuscript Library in the Yale Collection of American Literature.

== Bibliography ==
- Galimathias (1923)
- Zola and His Time (1928, biography)
- Portrait of the Artist as American (1930)
- Jean-Jacques Rousseau (1932, biography)
- Nazi Culture: The Brown Darkness Over Germany (1933)
- The Robber Barons: The Great American Capitalists (1934)
- The Politicos, 1865–1896 (1938, nonfiction)
- The President Makers: The Culture of Politics and Leadership in an Age of Enlightenment, 1896–1919 (1940, nonfiction)
- Victor Hugo: A Realistic Biography of the Great Romantic (1942, biography)
- Empire of the Air: Juan Trippe and the Struggle for World Airways (1943)
- Stendhal: or The Pursuit of Happiness (1946, biography)
- Sidney Hillman: Statesman of American Labor (1952, biography)
- Union House, Union Bar: The History of the Hotel & Restaurant Employees and Bartenders International Union, AFL-CIO (1956, nonfiction)
- Edison (1959, biography)
- Life Among the Surrealists (1962, memoir)
- Infidel in the Temple: A Memoir of the 1930s (1967, memoir)
- Al Smith: Hero of the Cities; a Political Portrait Drawing on the Papers of Frances Perkins (1969, co-written with Hannah Josephson)
- The Money Lords: The Great Finance Capitalists, 1925–1950 (1972, nonfiction)
