= Street of Riches =

Novel by the Canadian author Gabrielle Roy

First edition

Street of Riches (fr. Rue Deschambault) is a novel by the Canadian author Gabrielle Roy. It was originally published in French as Rue Deschambault by Beauchemin in 1955. An English translation by Harry L. Binsse, Street of Riches, was published by McClelland and Stewart in 1957.

Largely autobiographical, it traces the growth and development of a young girl into an accomplished writer. Like much of Roy's fiction, it includes a very autobiographical style and weaves vignettes into a tapestry of the specific time and place. The book covers themes including the social divide between the French Canadian and English Canadian communities in what were the twin cities of St. Boniface and Winnipeg, Manitoba, European immigration to the Canadian prairies, family dynamics and racial integration.

According to literary criticism, the novel is part of the realistic movement.
