= Children of My Heart =

1977 novel by Gabrielle Roy

- First edition (publ. McClelland and Stewart)
- Author: Gabrielle Roy
- Original title: Ces enfants de ma vie
- Language: French
- Set in: 1930s
- Publisher: McClelland & Stewart
- Publication date: 1977
- Publication place: Canada

Children of My Heart is a novel by Gabrielle Roy, published in 1983. The novel, Roy's last published work of fiction, was originally published in French as Ces enfants de ma vie.

The novel's protagonist is "Gabrielle Roy", a young teacher in a 1930s Prairie town. Based on Roy's own experiences as a teacher, the novel focuses on Gabrielle Roy's relationship with her students and Mederic.

== Awards and nominations ==
The novel won the 1977 Governor General's Award for French language fiction. Its English translation was selected for inclusion in the 2007 edition of Canada Reads, where it was championed by journalist Denise Bombardier. It was, however, the first book voted out of the competition by the panelists.

== Adaptations ==
The novel was adapted into a television film in 2000. Directed by Keith Ross Leckie, the film starred Geneviève Désilets, Geneviève Bujold and Michael Moriarty.
