= Embassy of Canada, Washington, D.C. =

Canada's main diplomatic mission to the United States

Embassy of Canada in Washington, D.C.
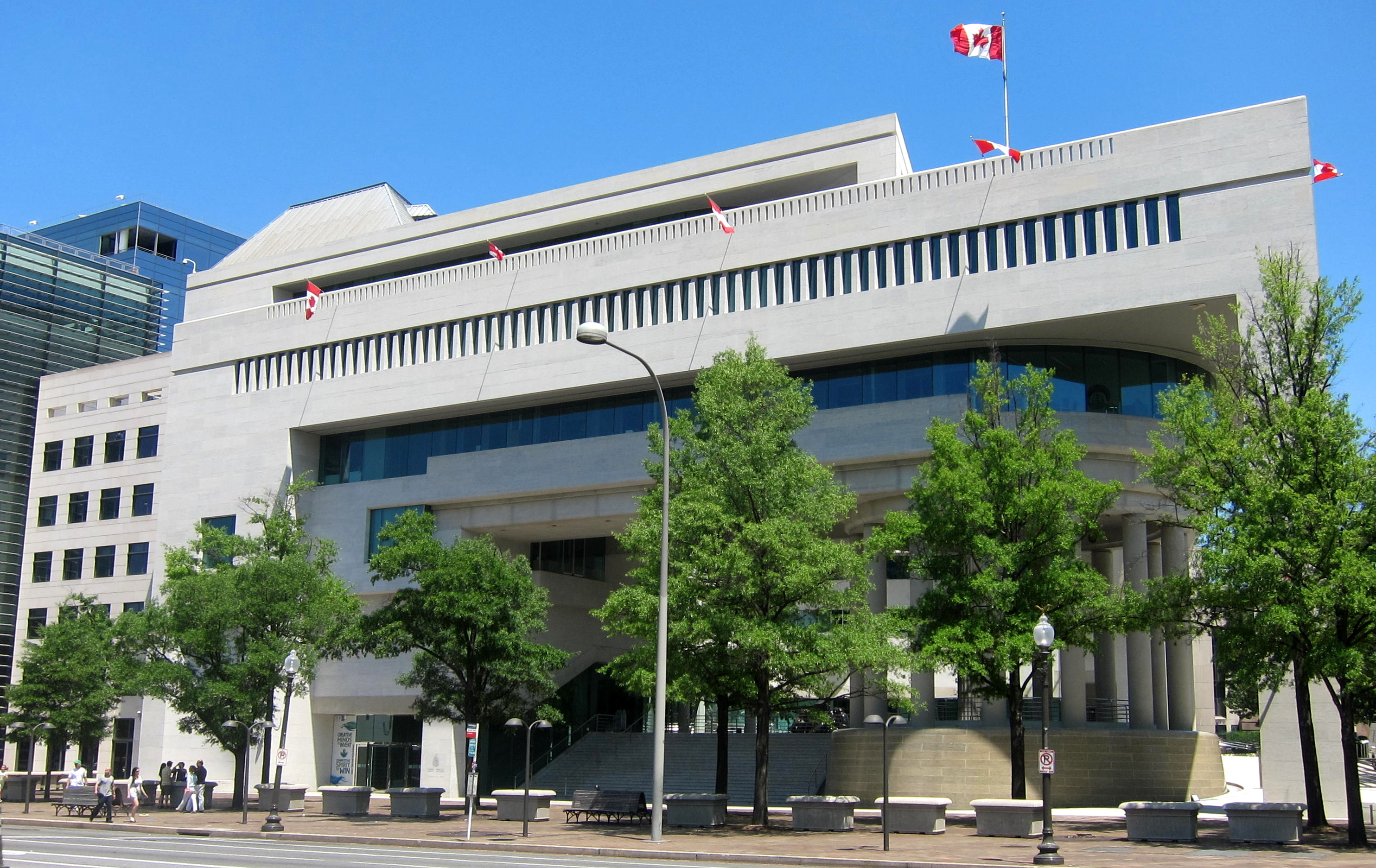
- The Embassy of Canada in Washington, D.C.
- Location: Washington, D.C. 20001
- Address: 501 Pennsylvania Avenue NW, Washington, D.C., U.S.
- Coordinates: 38°53′35″N 77°1′6″W
- Inaugurated: May 3, 1989
- Ambassador: Mark Wiseman
- Website: www.international.gc.ca/country-pays/us-eu/washington.aspx

The Embassy of Canada in Washington, D.C. (French: Ambassade du Canada à Washington, D.C.) is Canada's main diplomatic mission to the United States. The embassy building designed by Arthur Erickson and opened in 1989 is located at 501 Pennsylvania Avenue Northwest, Washington, D.C., between the United States Capitol and the White House, just north of the National Gallery of Art. In addition to its diplomatic role, the embassy provides consular services for Delaware, Washington, D.C., Maryland, Virginia, and West Virginia. It also hosts a Trade Commissioner Service office responsible for the states of Maryland, Washington, D.C., Virginia, and West Virginia.

== History ==
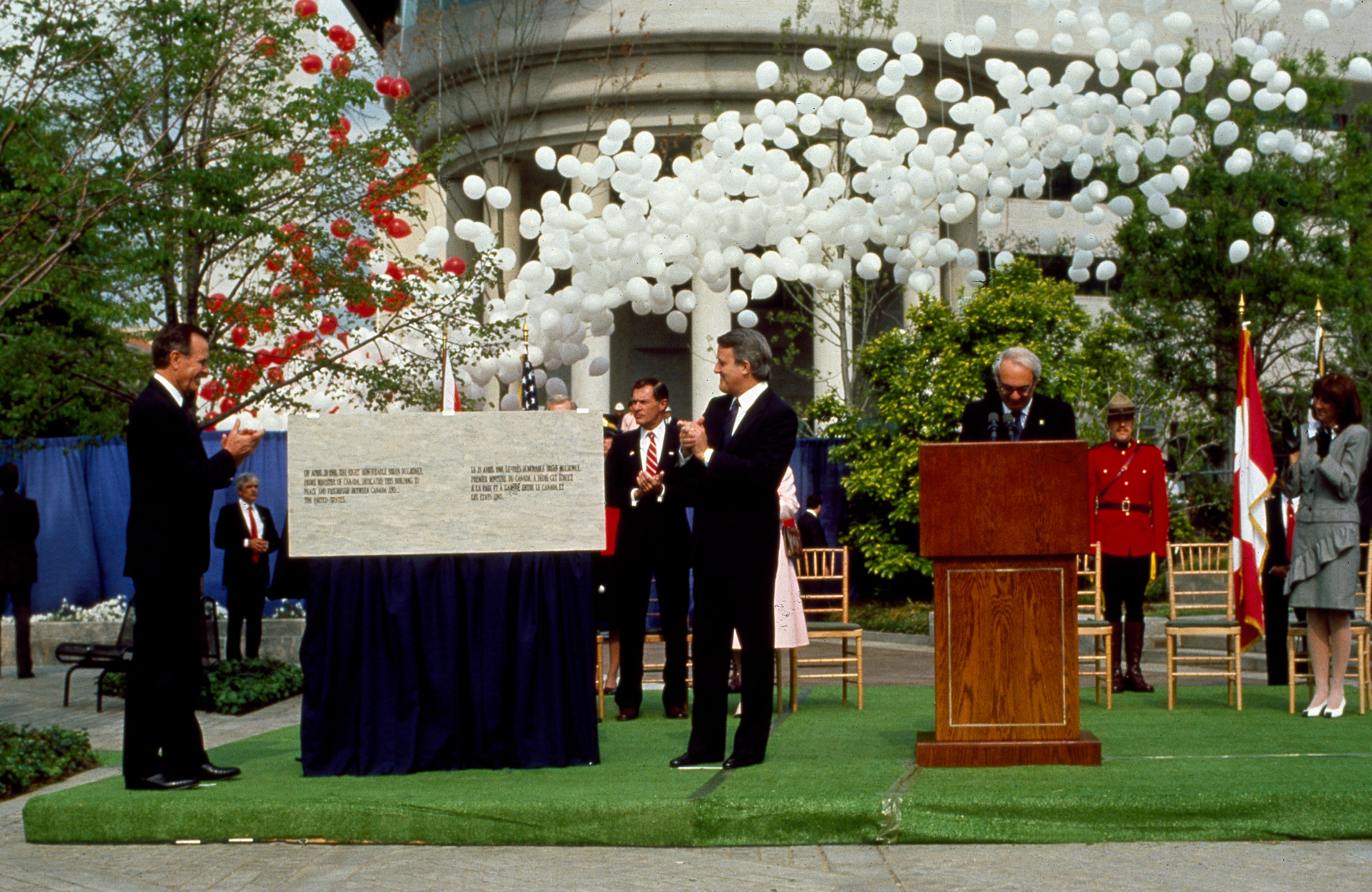
Prime Minister Brian Mulroney with President George H.W. Bush during the 1989 opening ceremony of the Canadian Embassy in Washington, D.C

The Embassy of Canada was originally located at 1746 Massachusetts Avenue NW on Embassy Row, in a house that had been purchased in 1927 from the widow of Clarence Moore, a financier who died in the sinking of the RMS Titanic. The location subsequently became the Embassy of Uzbekistan.

By 1969, the chancery had spread across three buildings and could not accommodate additional staff. At the same time, the federally chartered Pennsylvania Avenue Development Corporation was looking to revitalize the avenue. In 1978, the Canadian government purchased a vacant lot on Pennsylvania Avenue NW for $5 million. The site had been a Ford dealership (built in 1916 by Irwin and Leighton as Ford Service Building) and a public library. The six floor building was demolished before it was purchased by the Government of Canada.

The embassy building was officially opened by Prime Minister Brian Mulroney on May 3, 1989. The building houses approximately 265 Canadian diplomatic and locally engaged staff. The embassy houses representatives from two provinces (Ontario and Alberta) and 13 Canadian federal government agencies, including Foreign Affairs, International Trade and Development Canada, Industry Canada, Transport Canada, Public Works and Government Services Canada, the Department of National Defence, the Permanent Mission of Canada to the Organization of American States, the Royal Canadian Mounted Police, amongst others. Additionally, the Government of Quebec's Ministry of International Relations and La Francophonie has operated a bureau in Washington since 1978; it is located near McPherson Square.

Canada has the embassy closest to the Capitol Building and is the only country to have its embassy along the presidential inaugural route between the Capitol Building and the White House.

The Embassy of Canada hosts numerous events throughout the year for visiting ministers as well as for a wide range of diplomatic, military, and public functions.

== Architecture ==
The Pennsylvania Avenue NW building was designed by British Columbia's Arthur Erickson, one of Canada's most decorated architects. Erickson tried to evoke a sense of Canada in the architecture of the building, using long horizontals, wide open spaces and water features. The large airy courtyard includes the sculpture Spirit of Haida Gwaii by Bill Reid, featured on Canada's twenty-dollar bill from 2004 to 2012, which sits in a pool of water representative of Canada's ocean limits.

The "Rotunda of the Provinces" on the courtyard's southeast corner has a domed roof that is supported by 12 pillars, each featuring one of the crests of the ten provinces and two territories in existence at the time of the embassy's construction. The seal above the rotunda's entranceway represents the territory of Nunavut, which was established in April 1999. The rotunda is also an echo chamber; noise is reflected and focused back, though this magnified volume is only appreciated by the person at the rotunda's centre. Surrounding the rotunda is a waterfall, incorporated by the architect to represent Niagara Falls, the most famous site along the Canada–U.S. border.

In the words of former U.S. Secretary of State James Baker, "I think just as diplomats represent their country, people and interest to the world, so too an embassy chancery displays its country's face to the world…This bold and dramatic building, the new Chancery of Canada does that. Monumental in its appearance, it also I think conveys the warmth and the openness of the people of Canada. Your new home here in the centre of our new capital [is] along an avenue which is steeped in the history of American democracy between the White House and the Congress."

== Artwork ==
The Embassy of Canada has four collections on display: the Foreign Affairs Fine Art Collection (a permanent collection at the embassy), the Canada Council Art Bank, the Imperial Oil collection and the Scotiabank Corporate Art collection. The embassy also currently has several arctic-themed works that are on loan from TD Bank, in honour of Canada's 2013–2015 chairship of the Arctic Council. The Foreign Affairs Fine Art Collection contains Canadian art for use in Embassies and Official Residences abroad. By displaying Canadian art in this manner, the collection assists in the promotion of Canadian culture abroad.

The Canada Council Art Bank is a collection of Canadian art that is loaned to Canadian government departments, agencies and private sector corporations.

Imperial Oil has lent the embassy 10 works from their corporate collection, providing a regional perspective of Canadian art. Of particular note are the works "Heart of the Forest" by Emily Carr and the Group of Seven's, A.J. Casson's piece "Morning near Whitefish Falls."

The Scotiabank Corporate art collection is one of the leading corporate art collections in Canada, consisting of significant works of art by renowned Canadian contemporary artists. This includes photography by Edward Burtynsky and Geoffrey James and a silkscreen on paper by Christopher Pratt.

The embassy also has a small gallery set just off of the main foyer that showcases Canadian artists or Canada-themed exhibits. In September 2014, the gallery hosted a special exhibit honouring the embassy's 25th anniversary.

== Ambassador ==
Financier Mark Wiseman was appointed Canada's Ambassador to the United States in December 2025, taking office in February 2026.

== Consulates general ==
The ambassador is also ultimately responsible for the 12 regional consulates:

1. Consulate General of Canada in Atlanta, serving the states of Georgia, Alabama, Mississippi, North Carolina, South Carolina, and Tennessee
2. Consulate General of Canada in Boston, serving the states of Maine, Massachusetts, New Hampshire, Vermont, and Rhode Island, and the French overseas collectivity of Saint Pierre and Miquelon
3. Consulate General of Canada in Chicago, serving the states of Illinois, Wisconsin, and Missouri, and the northwestern portions of Indiana in metropolitan Chicago, the portions of Kansas in metropolitan Kansas City, and the portions of Iowa in the Quad Cities area
4. Consulate General of Canada in Dallas, serving the states of Arkansas, Louisiana, New Mexico, Oklahoma, and Texas
5. Consulate General of Canada in Denver, serving the states of Colorado, Montana, Wyoming, and Utah, and all of Kansas outside metropolitan Kansas City
6. Consulate General of Canada in Detroit, serving the states of Michigan, Ohio, and Kentucky, and all of Indiana outside metropolitan Chicago
7. Consulate General of Canada in Los Angeles, serving Southern California, Clark County/Las Vegas in Nevada, and the state of Arizona
8. Consulate General of Canada in Miami, serving the U.S. state of Florida and the U.S. territories of Puerto Rico and the U.S. Virgin Islands
9. Consulate General of Canada in Minneapolis, serving the states of Minnesota, Nebraska, North Dakota, South Dakota, and the portions of Iowa outside the Quad Cities area
10. Consulate General of Canada in New York City, serving the states of New York, Connecticut, Delaware, New Jersey, and Pennsylvania, and the British overseas territory of Bermuda
11. Consulate General of Canada in San Francisco/Silicon Valley, serving Northern California, the state of Hawaii, and all of the state of Nevada except Clark County/Las Vegas
12. Consulate General of Canada in Seattle, serving the states of Washington, Alaska, Idaho, and Oregon

== Trade offices ==
1. Canadian Consulate in Houston
2. Palo Alto
3. San Diego

== Gallery ==
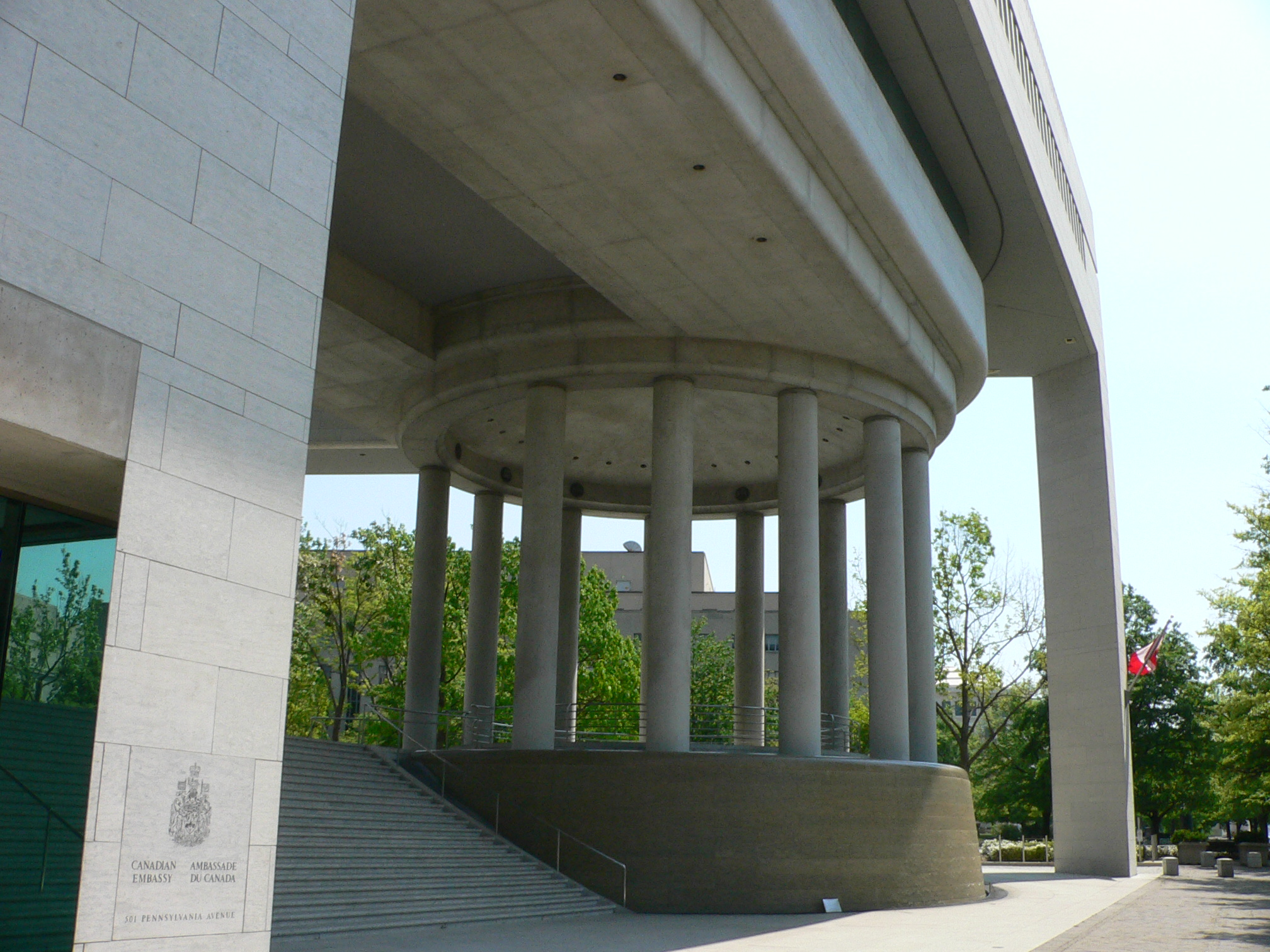
Rotunda of the Provinces

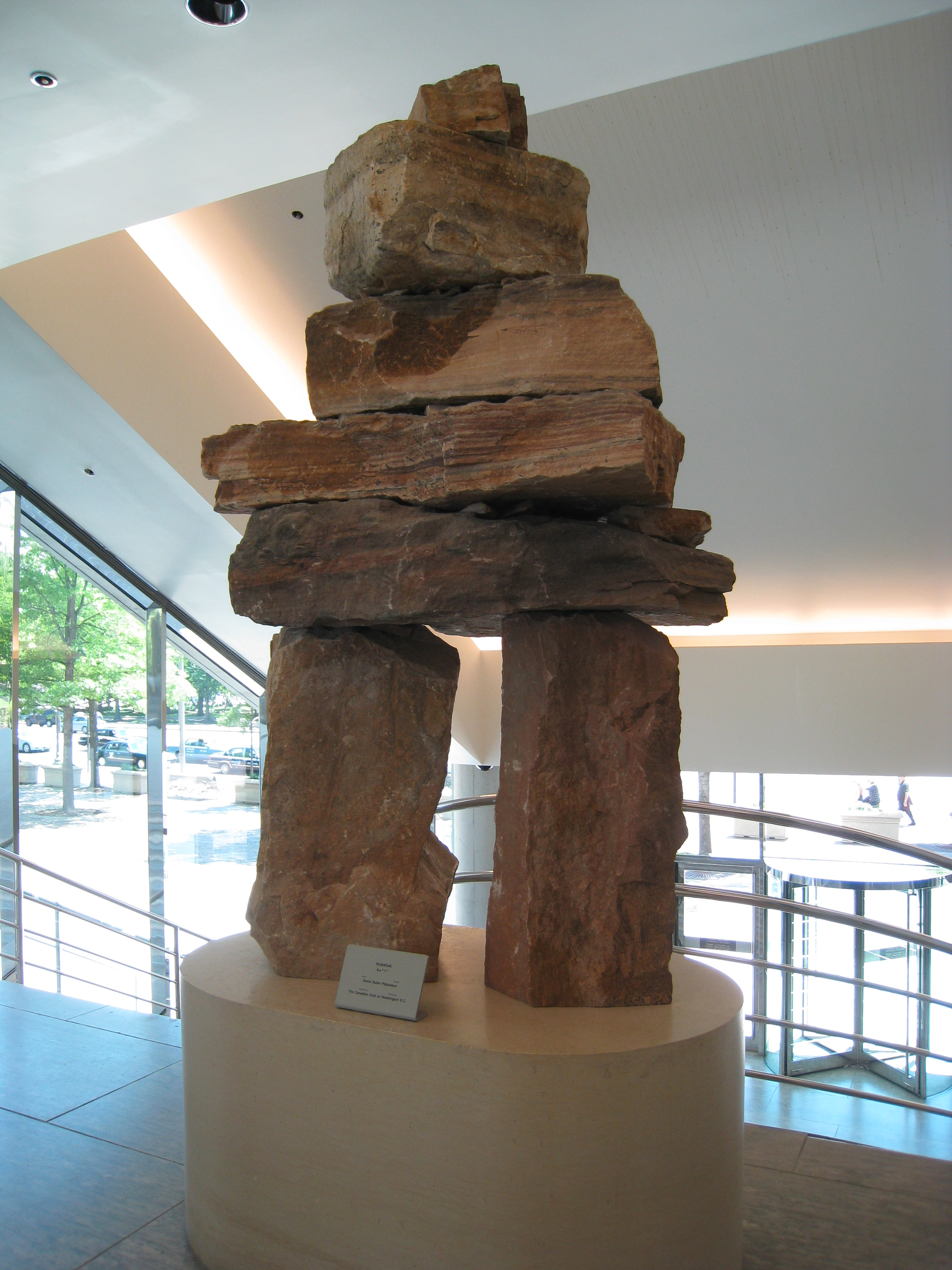
Inukshuk sculpture by David Ruben Piqtoukun in the lobby

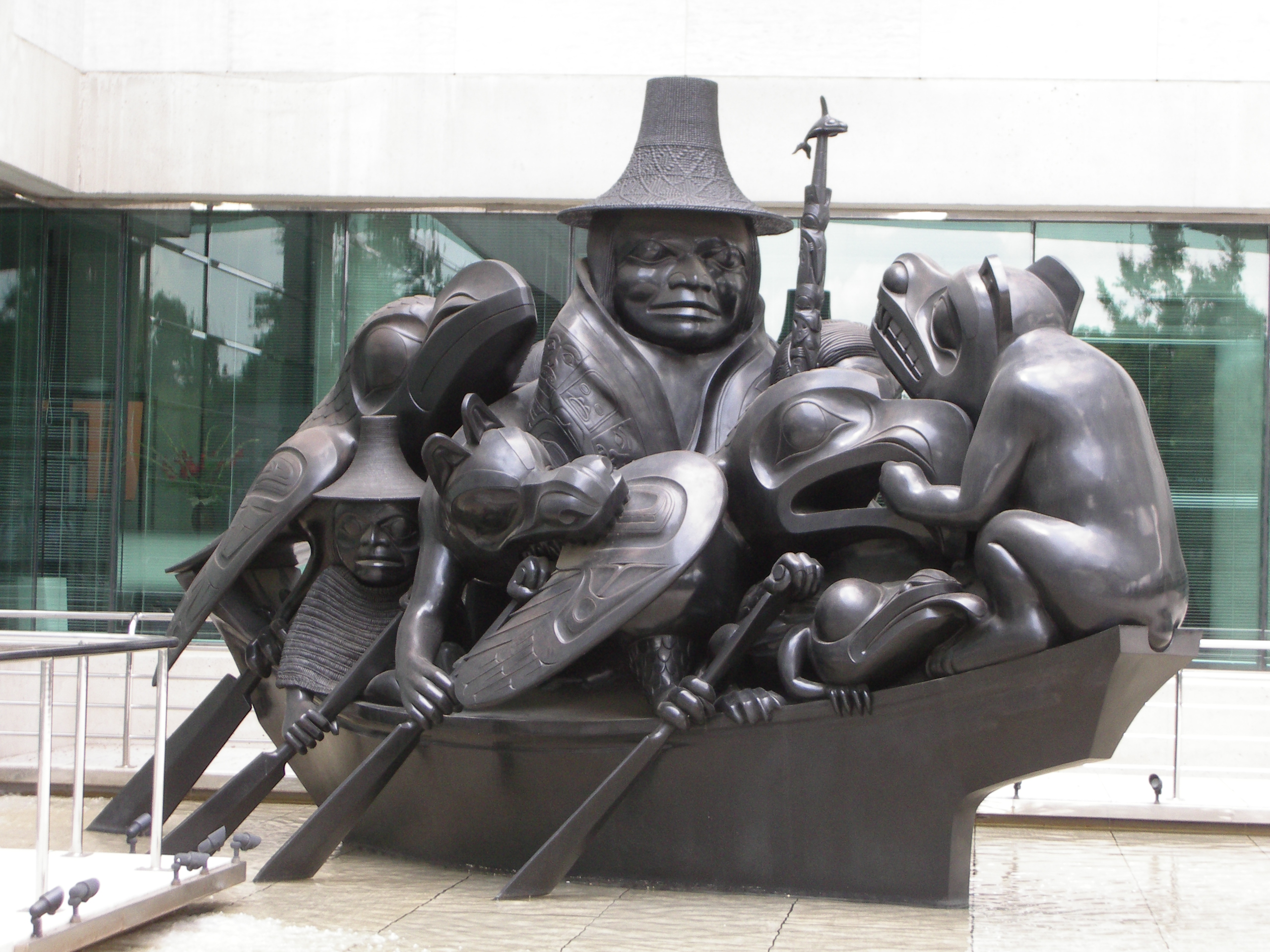
Spirit of Haida Gwaii

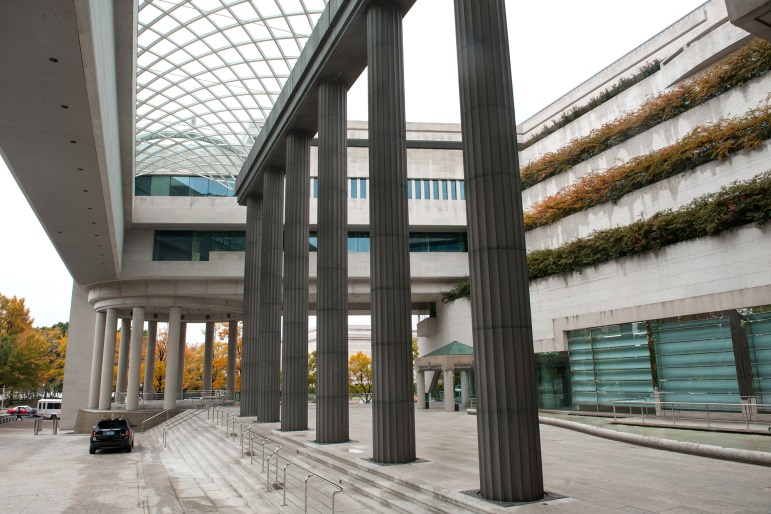
Embassy courtyard, looking toward the Rotunda of the Provinces

== See also ==
- Canada–United States relations
- Embassy of the United States, Ottawa
- List of ambassadors of Canada to the United States
- Architecture of Washington, D.C.
