= Canadian twenty-dollar note =

Current denomination of Canadian currency

Twenty dollars
- Country: Canada
- Value: 20 Canadian dollars
- Width: 152.4 mm
- Height: 69.85 mm
- Weight: 0.934 g
- Security features: Holographic stripe, watermark, EURion constellation, tactile marks, registration device, raised printing, UV printing
- Material used: Polymer

Obverse
- Design: Charles III (since 2026); Elizabeth II (1935–1937; 1954–2025); George VI (1937–1954)

Reverse
- Design: Canadian National Vimy Memorial

The Canadian twenty-dollar note is one of the most common banknotes of the Canadian dollar; it is the primary banknote dispensed from Canadian automated teller machines (ATMs). The newest version, the Frontier Series polymer note, was released to the general public on November 7, 2012, replacing the banknote from the Canadian Journey Series.

== Frontier series ==
The Frontier series $20 banknote was first issued on November 7, 2012. It is a polymer-based note featuring Queen Elizabeth II on the face and the Vimy Ridge memorial on the back. The window displays the Peace Tower.

On January 18, 2013, a Canadian botanist complained that a foreign maple leaf was used as the emblem on the polymer notes instead of the sugar maple that the country has on its national flag, along with the $50 and $100 notes.

After the death of Elizabeth II, the banknotes with her image continue to be legal tender. Despite initial speculation that Elizabeth's successor, Charles III, might not appear in future designs, it was confirmed on the day of Charles' coronation, May 6, 2023, that the King would replace his mother on future $20 banknotes. On September 3, 2026, the Bank of Canada unveiled the design for the new $20 notes, featuring a portrait of Charles III. The new $20 banknotes will gradually enter circulation in late February 2027.

== History ==
The Canadian $20 bill is one of the denominations of Canadian currency. The first $20 bill was issued in 1935, and features a portrait of Princess Elizabeth on the front and an agricultural allegory on the back, featuring a kneeling male exhibiting the produce of the field to a female agricultural figure.

All Canadian banknotes underwent a major redesign in 1991, partially to incorporate some of the latest anti-forgery methods. Notes continue to be improved, with another design revealed on August 25, 2004, and placed into circulation on September 29, 2004. Notes were printed on paper composed of pure cotton at two Ottawa companies contracted for the purpose: the Canadian Bank Note Company and BA International Inc., a part of the Giesecke & Devrient GmbH group of companies.

Each note in the 1991 series is sprinkled with special green ink dots, called planchettes, that glow when exposed to ultraviolet light. The ink can be scraped off, so worn notes tend to have fewer, if any, glowing dots. These were replaced with more permanent ultraviolet-detected threads in the 2004-series notes, as well as an ink imprint of the coat of arms.

=== Canadian Journey Series ===
Introduced in 2004 and circulated until its replacement in 2012, the Canadian Journey Series 20-dollar note is predominantly green. The face features a portrait of Elizabeth II, Queen of Canada, the royal arms of Canada, and a picture of the Centre Block of the Parliament buildings. Security features visible from the face include a holographic stripe along the left side, depicting the number 20 alternated with maple leaves; a watermark of the Queen's portrait; and a broken-up number 20, which resolves itself when backlit. The back depicts artworks by Bill Reid, notably his sculptures The Raven and the First Men and Spirit of Haida Gwaii; it also has a quotation from Gabrielle Roy. The back also has a visible security feature: an interleaved metallic strip, reading 20 CAN repeatedly along its length. Yellow dots representing the EURion constellation can be found on both sides (and on all 2001 series notes). As well as textured printing, the 2004 design incorporates a special tactile feature similar to Braille dots for the blind indicating the denomination. The 2004 $20 note was awarded Bank Note of the Year by the International Bank Note Society in 2005.

As with all modern Canadian banknotes, all text is in both English and French.

== Twenty-dollar view ==
The view of Moraine Lake in Banff National Park from the top of the moraine rockpile is one of the most photographed locations in all of Canada. That view of the mountains behind the lake in Valley of the Ten Peaks is known as the "twenty-dollar view", as Moraine Lake is featured on the backs of the 1969 and 1979 issues of the Canadian $20 note.

Series	Main colour	Obverse	Reverse	Series year	Issued	Withdrawn	Notes
1935 series	Rose pink	Princess Elizabeth	Agriculture allegory	1935	11 March 1935		
1937 series	Olive green	George VI	Fertility allegory	1937	19 July 1937		
Canadian Landscape	Olive green	Elizabeth II	Winter landscape, Laurentian Mountains, Quebec	1954	9 September 1954		
Scenes of Canada	Green	Elizabeth II	Moraine Lake and the Canadian Rockies, Alberta	1969	22 June 1970	18 December 1978	
Scenes of Canada	Green	Elizabeth II	Moraine Lake and the Canadian Rockies, Alberta	1979	18 December 1978	29 June 1993	
Birds of Canada	Green	Elizabeth II	Common loon	1991	29 June 1993	29 September 2004	
Canadian Journey	Green	Elizabeth II	Artwork of Bill Reid, and an excerpt from Gabrielle Roy's novel The Hidden Mountain	2004	29 September 2004	7 November 2012	
Frontier	Green	Elizabeth II	Canadian National Vimy Memorial and poppies	2012	7 November 2012		
Frontier	Green	Elizabeth II	Canadian National Vimy Memorial and poppies	2015	9 September 2015		2015 commemorative version
