= The Tin Flute =

1945 novel by Gabrielle Roy

- First English-language edition
- Author: Gabrielle Roy
- Original title: Bonheur d'occasion
- Language: French
- Publication date: 1945
- Publication place: Canada
- English publication date: 1947 (Reynal & Hitchcock)
- Media type: Print (novel)
- ISBN: 978-0-7710-9860-4
- OCLC: 20541923

The Tin Flute (original French title Bonheur d'occasion, literally "secondhand happiness") is the first novel by Canadian author Gabrielle Roy and a classic of Canadian fiction. Imbued with Roy's brand of compassion and understanding, this story focuses on a family in the Saint-Henri slums of Montreal, its struggles to overcome poverty and ignorance, and its search for love.

A story of familial tenderness, sacrifice, and survival during World War II, The Tin Flute won both the Governor General's Award and the Prix Femina of France. The novel was made into a critically acclaimed motion picture in 1983. It was originally published in French as Bonheur d'occasion (literally, "secondhand happiness"), which represents the character's sense of rebound love in the novel.

Bonheur d'occasion gave a starkly realistic portrait of the lives of people in Saint-Henri, a working-class neighbourhood of Montreal. The novel caused many Quebecers to take a hard look at themselves and is regarded as the novel that helped lay the foundation for Quebec's Quiet Revolution of the 1960s. The original French version won Roy the prestigious Prix Femina in 1947. Published in English as The Tin Flute in 1947, the book also won the 1947 Governor General's Award for fiction as well as the Royal Society of Canada's Lorne Pierce Medal. Distributed in the United States, where it sold more than three-quarters of a million copies, the Literary Guild of America made The Tin Flute a featured book of the month in 1947. The book garnered so much attention that Roy returned to Manitoba to escape the publicity.

There are two French versions of Bonheur d'occasion. The first was published in 1945 by Société des Éditions Pascal in two volumes. This version was translated in 1947 by Hannah Josephson, who removed several short passages from the English version. In 1965, Librairie Beauchemin published an abridged French version eliminating a number of passages. This second version was translated by Alan Brown in 1980. As a result, there has never been an unabridged version of The Tin Flute published in English.

== Synopsis ==
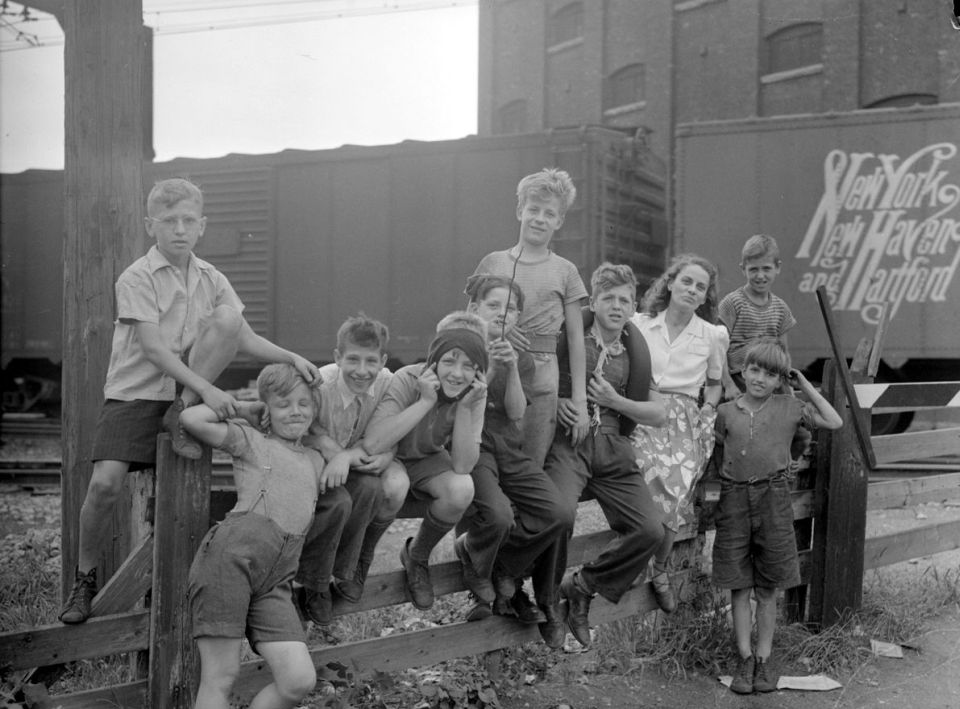
Gabrielle Roy in 1945 with boys from Saint-Henri, the working-class neighbourhood of Montreal where The Tin Flute takes place.

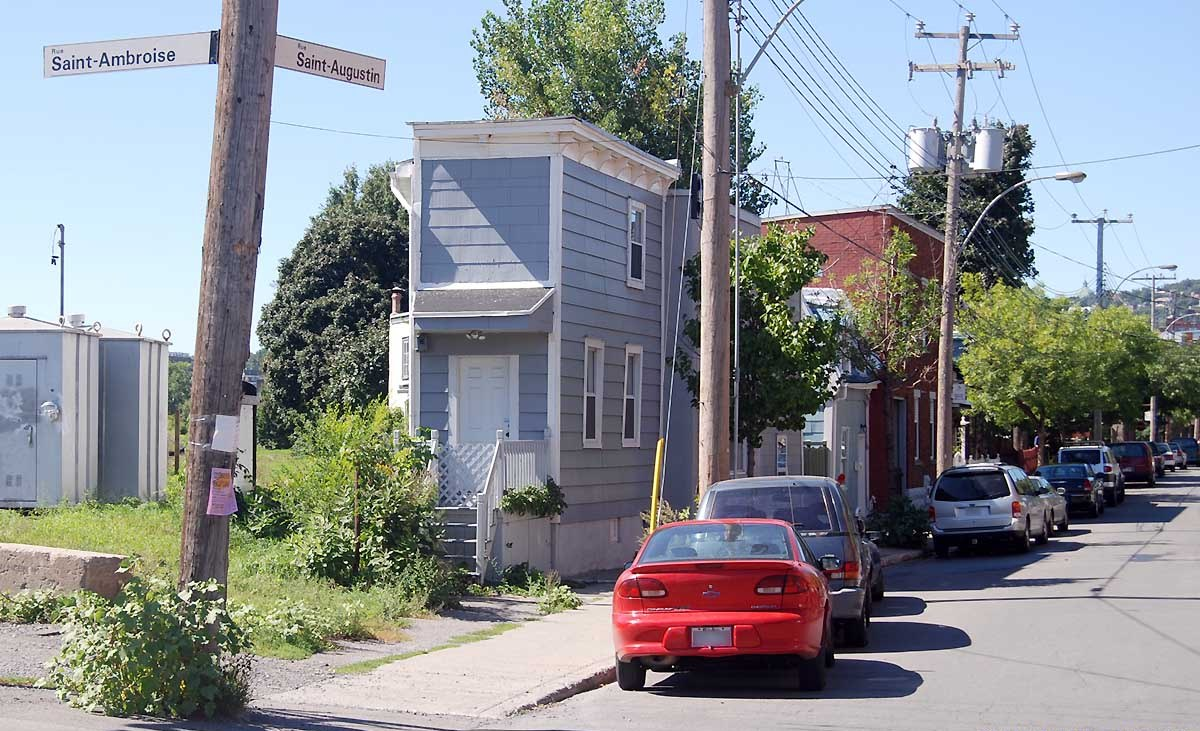
The wedge house of the novel

The story takes place in Montreal, principally in the poor neighbourhood of Saint-Henri, between February 1940 and May 1940, during the Second World War, when Quebec is still suffering from the Great Depression. Florentine Lacasse, a nineteen year-old waitress at the "Five and Ten" restaurant, financially supports her large family. Her mother, Rose-Anna, stays home to take care of her eleven children while Florentine's father, Azarius, struggles to maintain a job due to his perpetual unhappiness. Florentine dreams of a better life and falls in love with Jean Lévesque, an ambitious and well-off machinist-electrician. Wanting to satisfy his withered ego, Jean agrees to date Florentine. Quickly tiring of the relationship, he introduces her to a friend, Emmanuel Létourneau, who is a soldier on leave. Emmanuel falls in love with Florentine. Despite this, Florentine's attraction towards Jean will have important consequences in her life; the more obsessive her feelings for Jean become, the more vulnerable she is. The turning point of the novel is Jean's sexual assault of Florentine, after which she becomes pregnant with Jean's child. In order for her to avoid the trope of the "fallen woman," she keeps the pregnancy a secret and marries Emmanuel, as he promises to support her.

== Impact ==
The Tin Flute was declared a historical event in Quebecois heritage by the Ministry of Culture and Communications (Quebec) in August 2017. Culture minister Luc Fortin argued that Roy's novel marks a break in Quebecois literature from a tradition of working-class novels and literature celebrating rural life and the "beginning of a protest literature that emerges in a period of profound social transformations"

== Themes ==
=== Dispossession ===
The novel details the loss of many things in the lives of several characters. For Rose-Anna, it is the loss of her children: Eugene to the army, Florentine to marriage, and Daniel to death. For Azarius, it is the loss of his vocation and subsequently his identity as a "man".

=== Solitude ===
Despite being about a family, the novel demonstrates the solitude of the various characters. For Rose-Anna, that is best seen at the end of the novel, when she gives birth practically alone. She feels completely alone and even Azarius is not there when she calls for him.

=== Feminine condition ===
The condition of the woman is treated throughout the novel both on the individual level (in the lives of Rose-Anna and her daughter, Florentine) and universally when Rose-Anna identifies with women across the world who are affected by the senselessness of war. Feminist undertones can be found in the way Roy describes Rose-Anna's role in the family. Rose-Anna is, in some ways, a victim of circumstance with a husband who has no work, poverty that causes her to go searching for new lodging every spring, and her Catholic faith that does not allow her to use birth control and results in many pregnancies which take their toll on her both physically and emotionally.

=== Futility of war ===
Roy shows many opinions on the war by various characters, but there is a strong sense of war being senseless. Emmanuel is one character (along with Rose-Anna) who questions the meaning and motive behind going to war. He struggles with his own motivations and concludes that the purpose for going to war must be to end it one day. Another perspective on the conflict is embodied by both Azarius and Eugene; these two characters use enlistment as a method of escape from their poverty-stricken lives. Eugene sacrifices his security for a modicum of (mainly financial) independence from his family, whereas Azarius enlists as a last-ditch attempt to better his family's lives. In both cases, the characters enlisting are not doing so out of honor or virtue, but rather a misguided attempt to escape the economic conditions of their home.

== Characters ==
- Florentine Lacasse: A young waitress at the Five and Ten restaurant, she finds her current life to be one of drudgery and longs to find something better. She supports her parents and siblings financially.
- Azarius Lacasse: Florentine's father, a carpenter by trade who has fallen on hard times because of the depressed economy and is now working as a taxi driver to get by.
- Rose-Anna Lacasse: Florentine's mother, a central character in the novel who often takes on the role of the head of the family when Azarius fails to provide leadership.
- Jean Lévesque: An arrogant and ambitious machinist-electrician who believes himself to be better than others in Saint-Henri and is very concerned with reaching a higher status and social class.
- Emmanuel Létourneau: A friend of Jean Lévesque and a soldier who meets and falls in love with Florentine.
- Emma Philibert: Nicknamed "Fat Emma" or "Ma Philibert", the jovial owner of a combination restaurant and store
- Sam Latour: The owner of The Two Records restaurant/store, loves to discuss current affairs
- Eugene Lacasse: Florentine's brother, who joined the army
- Jenny: Daniel's nurse, an English woman

== Release details ==
- Bonheur d'occasion, Boréal Compact, Éditions du Boréal, 1993. ISBN 2-89052-575-9
- The Tin Flute, translated by Hannah Josephson (Reynal & Hitchcock, 1947; New Canadian Library, 1959)
- The Tin Flute, translated by Alan Brown (New Canadian Library, 1989). ISBN 0-7710-9860-X
