= Hannah Josephson =

American historian

- Born: June 6, 1900; New York City
- Died: October 29, 1976 (aged 76); New Milford, Connecticut
- Education: Hunter College; Columbia Graduate School of Journalism
- Occupations: Historian, journalist, and librarian
- Spouse: Matthew Josephson
- Awards: Van Wyck Brooks Award

Hannah Josephson, née Geffen (June 6, 1900 – October 29, 1976), was an American historian of the United States as well as a journalist and librarian.

== Life and work ==
Hannah Josephson was born in New York City, on June 6, 1900. She studied at Hunter College from 1916 to 1918 and at Columbia Graduate School of Journalism in 1918–19. She married the writer, Matthew Josephson, on May 6, 1920, and began working as a journalist. In 1949 Josephson became librarian, editor of publications, publicity director, and director of manuscript exhibition for the American Academy of Arts and Letters until her retirement in 1965. She died on October 29, 1976, in New Milford, Connecticut.

== Activities ==
Together with Malcolm Cowley, she published Aragon: Poet of the Resistance in 1945. Four years later, Josephson published The Golden Threads, a book on women who worked in the textile mills of Massachusetts between 1822 and 1850. With her husband she wrote Al Smith, Hero of the Cities: A Political Portrait Drawing on the Papers of Frances Perkins in 1969 for which they were awarded the Van Wyck Brooks Award of the University of Bridgeport. Her last book was Jeanette Rankin: First Lady in Congress in 1974. Josephson also translated several books including Louis Aragon’s The Century Was Young in 1941, Philippe Soupault’s Age of Assassins five years later, and Gabrielle Roy’s The Tin Flute in 1948.

Agnes Whitfield, York University, leads a SSHRC funded project on Josephson, the American translator of Bonheur d’occasion.
