= Gabrielle Roy =

Canadian author (1909–1983)

Gabrielle Roy CC
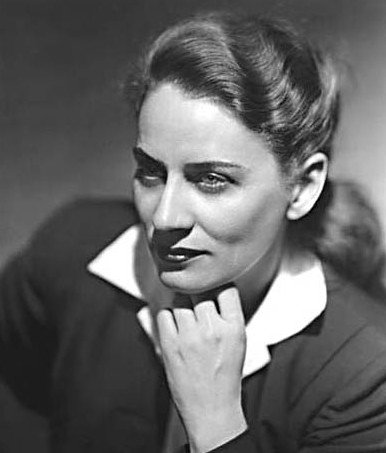
- Roy in 1945
- Born: March 22, 1909; Saint Boniface, Manitoba, Canada
- Died: July 13, 1983 (aged 74); Quebec City, Quebec, Canada
- Resting place: Parc commémoratif La Souvenance, Sainte-Foy, Quebec
- Occupations: Writer, teacher
- Spouse: Marcel Carbotte (m. 1947; died 1983)
- Writing career
- Language: French
- Genres: Fiction; Memoir; Children's literature
- Notable works: The Tin Flute; Street of Riches; Children of My Heart; The Fragile Lights of Earth
- Notable awards: Prix Femina (1947); Governor General's Award (1947, 1957, 1977); Lorne Pierce Medal (1948); Prix David (1971); Molson Prize (1978)

Gabrielle Roy (French pronunciation: [ɡabʁijɛl ʁwa]; March 22, 1909 – July 13, 1983) was a Canadian author from St. Boniface, Manitoba. She became one of the major voices in French-language literature in Canada, known for her portrayals of working-class life in Manitoba and Quebec and for her clear, straightforward prose. Her first novel, Bonheur d’occasion (The Tin Flute), brought her national and international recognition, including major literary awards in both Canada and France. She went on to publish fiction, memoir, and children’s literature, and her work remains central to the development of modern Canadian writing in French. She was designated a National Historic Person by the Government of Canada in 2009.

== Early life ==
Gabrielle Roy was born on 22 March 1909 in the largely French-speaking community of Saint-Boniface, Manitoba, now part of Winnipeg. Roy, baptized Marie-Rose-Emma-Gabrielle, was the youngest of eleven children born to Léon Roy and Mélina Landry.

Roy grew up on rue Deschambault in Saint-Boniface. Her childhood home and the surrounding neighbourhood that would later inspire one of her most famous works.

She began school at the Académie Saint-Joseph in 1915 and reportedly began writing at an early age. Run by the Sisters of the Holy Names of Jesus and Mary, the school officially taught in English, however, the sisters nevertheless made room for French and Catholic religious instruction. Roy was reported to be a strong student and won a variety of medals and school prizes.

== Career ==
After graduation in 1928, she entered a one-year teacher-training program at the Provincial Normal School in Winnipeg. By the following spring, she was gaining classroom experience as a substitute teacher in Marchand, Manitoba and received her teaching certificate on 27 June 1929. In 1930, Roy began teaching a first-year class at the Institut Collégial Provencher, a boys' school in Saint-Boniface. She taught there for seven years.

With her savings she was able to spend some time in Europe, but was forced to return to Canada in 1939 at the outbreak of World War II. She returned with some of her works near completion, but settled in Quebec to earn a living as a sketch artist while continuing to write.

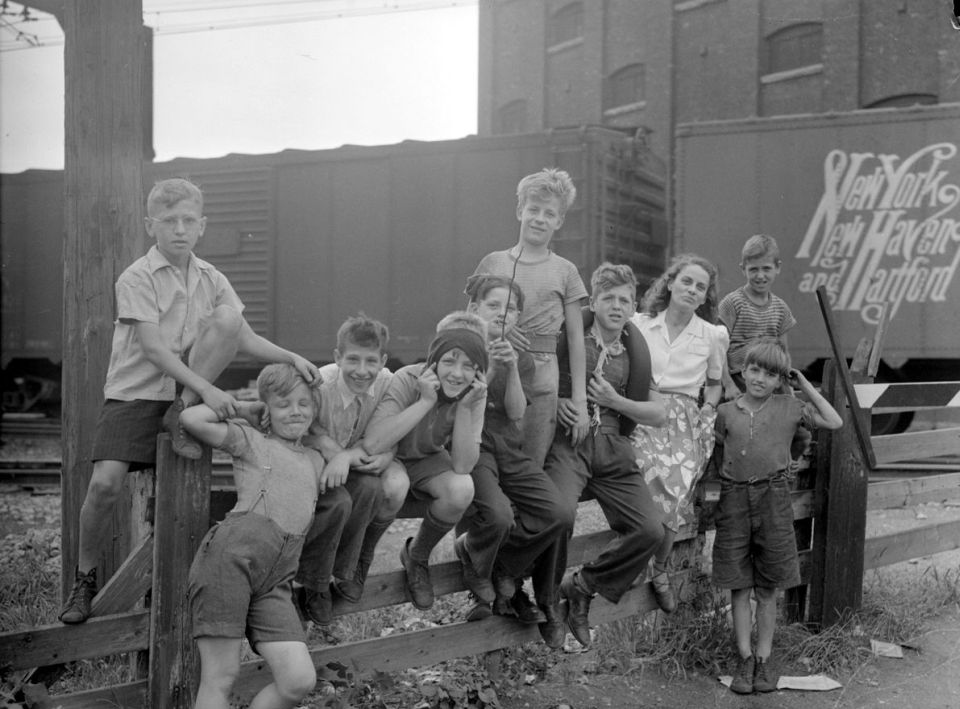
Gabrielle Roy in 1945 with children from Saint-Henri, the working-class neighbourhood of Montreal.

Her first novel, Bonheur d'occasion (1945), gave a starkly realistic portrait of the lives of people in Saint-Henri, a working-class neighbourhood of Montreal. The novel caused many Quebeckers to take a hard look at themselves, and is regarded as the novel that helped lay the foundation for Quebec's Quiet Revolution of the 1960s. The original French version won her the prestigious Prix Femina in 1947. Published in English as The Tin Flute (1947), the book won the 1947 Governor General's Award for fiction as well as the Royal Society of Canada's Lorne Pierce Medal. Distributed in the United States, where it sold more than three-quarters of a million copies, the Literary Guild of America made The Tin Flute a feature book of the month in 1947. The book garnered so much attention that Roy returned to Manitoba to escape the publicity.

There are two French versions of Bonheur d'occasion. The first was published in 1945 by Société des Éditions Pascal in two volumes. This version was translated in 1947 by Hannah Josephson, who removed several short passages from the English version. In 1965, Librairie Beauchemin published an abridged French version eliminating a number of passages. This second version was translated by Alan Brown in 1980. As a result, there has never been an unabridged version of The Tin Flute published in English.

Where Nests the Water Hen, Gabrielle Roy's second novel, is a sensitive and sympathetic tale that captures both the innocence and the vitality of a sparsely populated frontier.

Another of her novels brought additional critical acclaim. Alexandre Chenevert (1954), is a dark and emotional story that is ranked as one of the most significant works of psychological realism in the history of Canadian literature.

She is considered by many to be one of the most important Francophone writers in Canadian history and one of the most influential Canadian authors. In 1963, she was on a panel that gave the Montreal World's Fair, Expo 67, its theme: Terre des hommes or in English Man and His World. It was her suggestion to use Antoine de Saint-Exupéry's 1939 book title as the organizing theme. In 2016, Margaret Atwood, who had read her books as a teenager, wrote an essay about her career, and noted that her works were still more relevant than ever.

Her autobiography, La Détresse et l'enchantement, was published posthumously and translated in 1984 by Patricia Claxton, a prominent Quebec translator who is considered the primary translator of Gabrielle Roy's works from French to English. Her translation of Gabrielle Roy's autobiography, translated into English as Enchantment and Sorrow was awarded the Governor General's Award in 1987. The autobiography covers the years from Gabrielle Roy's childhood in Manitoba to the time when she settled in Quebec.

The movie Tramp at the Door, based on Roy's short story and released in 1985, was dedicated to her memory.

== Marriage ==
In 1947, the 38-year-old Roy married St-Boniface physician Marcel Carbotte after a three-month courtship. The couple spent the next three years in France, where Carbotte pursued studies in further medical studies in gynecology and Roy worked on La Petite Poule d’Eau (Where Nests the Water Hen). They returned to Canada in 1950, later moving to Quebec City in 1952.

== Works ==
The following is a selection of Roy's works. Dates refer to the first publication in French. English titles are followed by the original French titles.

=== Fiction and literary sketches ===
- 1945 – The Tin Flute (Bonheur d'occasion).
- 1950 – Where Nests the Water Hen (La Petite Poule d'Eau).
- 1954 – The Cashier (Alexandre Chenevert).
- 1955 – Street of Riches (Rue Deschambault).
- 1961 – The Hidden Mountain (La Montagne secrète).
- 1966 – The Road Past Altamont (La Route d'Altamont), translated into English by Joyce Marshall.
- 1970 – Windflower (La Rivière sans repos), translated into English by Joyce Marshall.
- 1972 – Enchanted Summer (Cet été qui chantait), translated into English by Joyce Marshall.
- 1975 – Garden in the Wind (Un jardin au bout du monde).
- 1977 – Children of My Heart (Ces enfants de ma vie).

=== Children's books ===
- 1976 – My Cow Bossie (Ma vache Bossie).
- 1979 – Cliptail (Courte-Queue).
- 1986 – The Tortoiseshell and the Pekinese (L'Espagnole et la Pékinoise), published posthumously.

=== Non-fiction ===
- 1978 – The Fragile Lights of Earth (Fragiles lumières de la terre), a collection of journalism and essays.
- 1984 – Enchantment and Sorrow (La Détresse et l'enchantement), an autobiography published posthumously.

== Awards and honours ==
=== Literary awards ===
- 1946 – Medal of the Académie canadienne-française, now the Académie des lettres du Québec.
- 1947 – Prix Femina for Bonheur d'occasion (The Tin Flute).
- 1947 – Governor General's Award for English-language fiction for The Tin Flute.
- 1948 – Lorne Pierce Medal from the Royal Society of Canada.
- 1956 – Prix Duvernay for her body of work.
- 1957 – Governor General's Award for English-language fiction for Street of Riches.
- 1971 – Prix David from the Government of Quebec for her body of work.
- 1977 – Governor General's Award for French-language fiction for Ces enfants de ma vie (Children of My Heart).
- 1978 – Molson Prize for her body of work.
- 1979 – Canada Council Children's Literature Prize for the French-language text of Courte-Queue (Cliptail).

=== National honours ===
- 1967 – Appointed a Companion of the Order of Canada.
- 2009 – Recognized by the Government of Canada as a National Historic Person.

=== Other recognition ===
- 1947 – The Literary Guild of America chose The Tin Flute as a book of the month.
- 2004 – Canada's new $20 banknote, part of the Canadian Journey Series, featured a passage from The Hidden Mountain in French and English.
- 2007 – Children of My Heart was selected for CBC's Canada Reads.

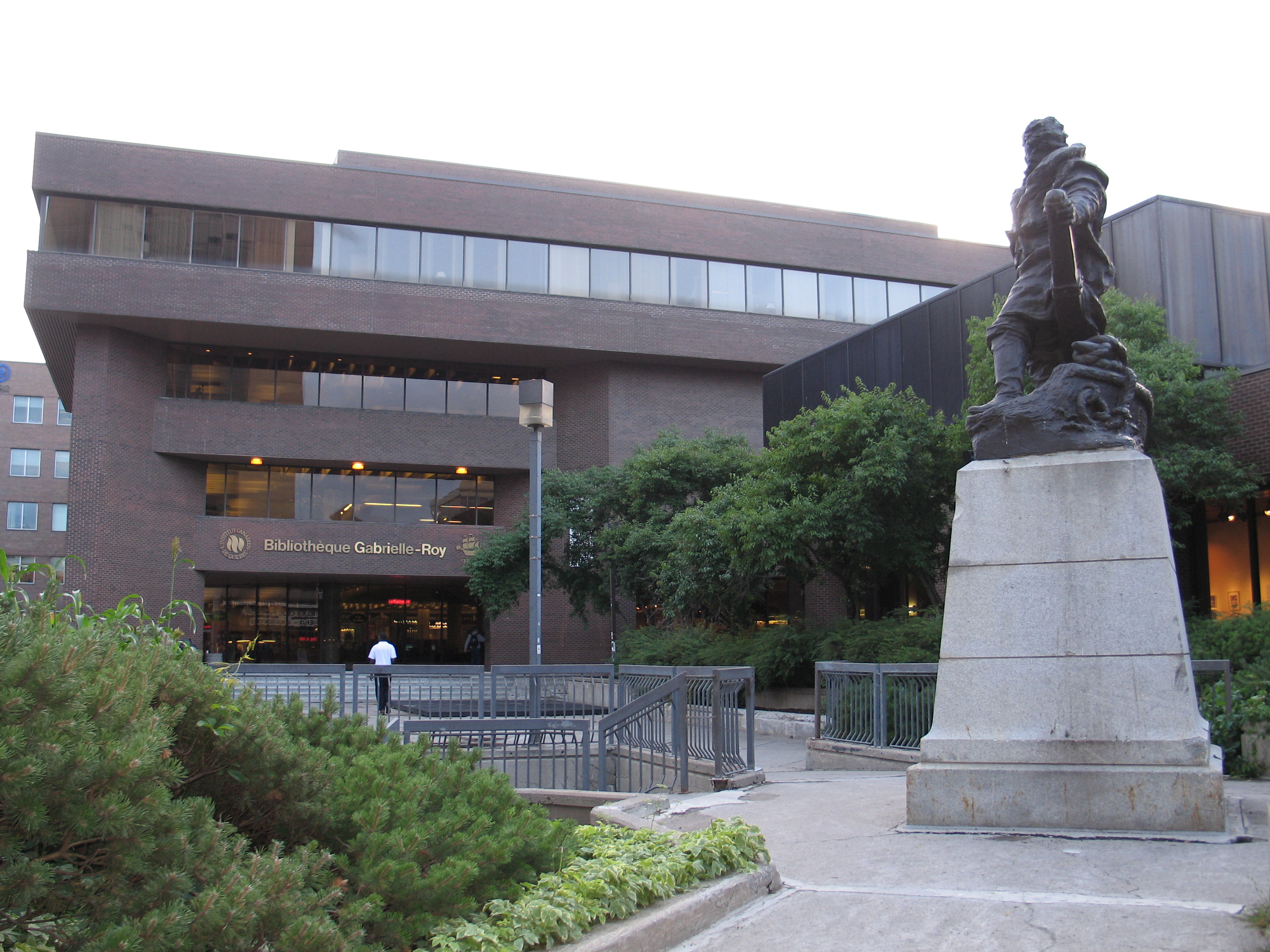
The central branch of the public library system of Quebec City, the Bibliothèque Gabrielle Roy

=== Places and institutions named in her honour ===
==== Schools ====
- École/Collège régional Gabrielle-Roy, an elementary and high school in Île-des-Chênes, Manitoba.
- École élémentaire publique Gabrielle-Roy, an elementary school in Gloucester, Ontario.
- École Gabrielle Roy, a school for Grades 7 and 8 in Châteauguay, Quebec.
- École Gabrielle-Roy, an elementary and high school in Surrey, British Columbia.
- École publique Gabrielle-Roy, a kindergarten to Grade 12 school in Edmonton, Alberta.
- École publique Gabrielle Roy, an elementary school in Toronto, Ontario.

==== College campuses ====
- Gabrielle-Roy, the main campus of CEGEP de l'Outaouais, a public college in Quebec.

==== Libraries ====
- Bibliothèque Gabrielle-Roy, the central branch of Quebec City's public library system.

== Death and legacy ==
Roy died of a heart attack on July 13, 1983, at the Hôtel-Dieu de Québec hospital in Quebec City. She was 74. Her will left her estate to her husband and to organizations that helped children.

About 600 people attended her funeral at Saint-Dominique Church in Quebec City. Auxiliary bishop Marc Leclerc led the service. Those attending included Quebec cultural affairs minister Clément Richard, Senate speaker Jean Marchand, and writers Roger Lemelin, Alain Stanké and Simonne Monet-Chartrand. She was cremated, and her ashes were laid to rest at what is now Parc commémoratif La Souvenance in Sainte-Foy.

Her childhood home at 375 Deschambault Street in Saint-Boniface, Winnipeg, is now a museum, La Maison Gabrielle Roy, and a National Historic Site. Roy was designated a National Historic Person in 2009. A plaque at the house recognizes her storytelling, clear prose and portrayals of the immigrant experience and Manitoba's Francophone community.

The National Library of Canada, now part of Library and Archives Canada, acquired her manuscripts in 1982 and additional materials in 1986. The collection includes drafts of her writing, personal and business correspondence, publishing contracts and financial records.

== See also ==
- La Maison Gabrielle Roy (or "The House of Gabrielle Roy") is a museum in the childhood home of Gabrielle Roy (in St. Boniface / Winnipeg, Manitoba, Canada).
