= Alain Stanké =

Canadian journalist (born 1934)

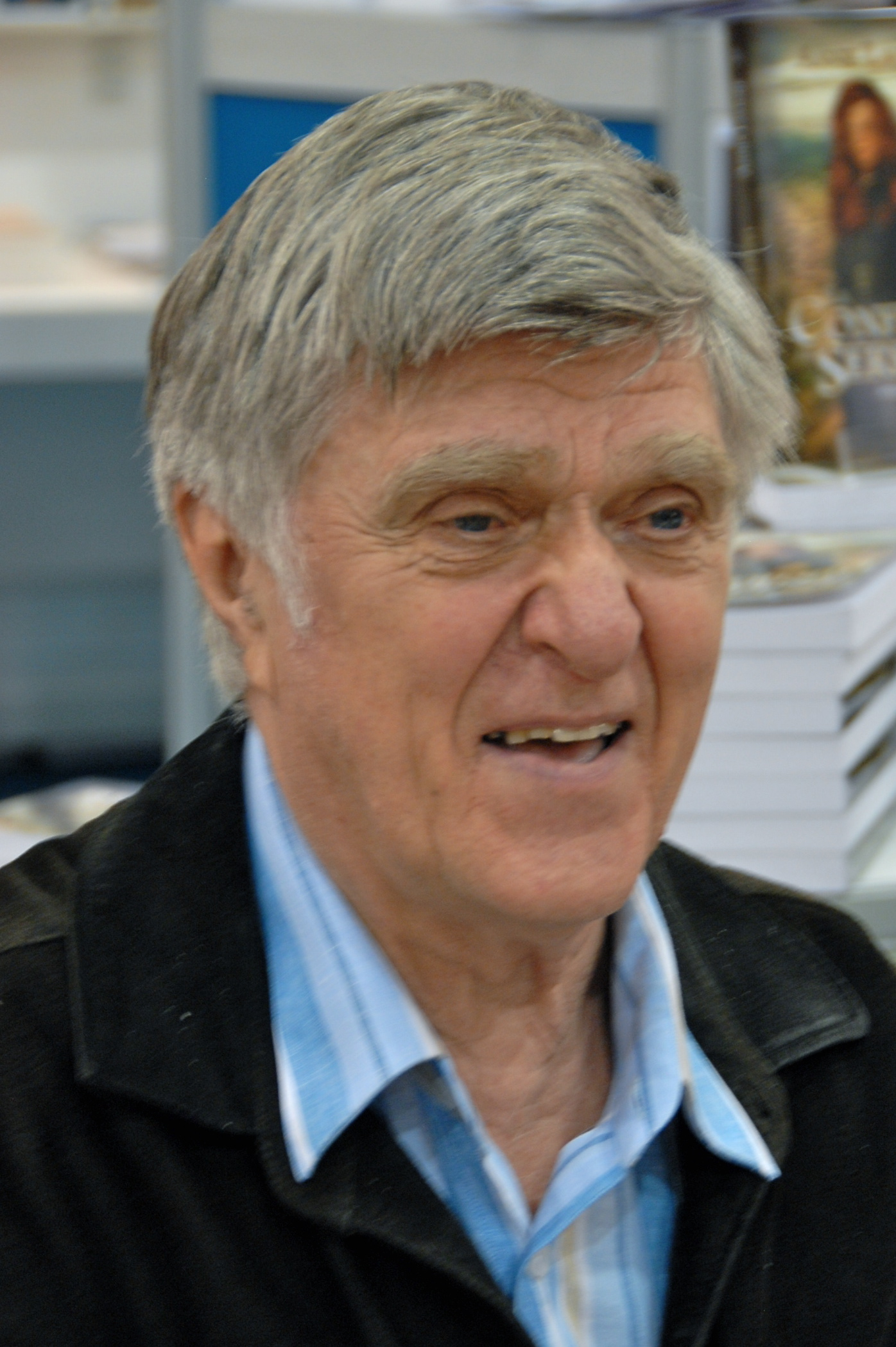
- Born: Aloyzas-Vytas Stankevicius; June 11, 1934 (age 91); Kaunas, Lithuania
- Awards: Order of Canada; National Order of Quebec

Alain Stanké (né Aloyzas-Vytas Stankevicius), CM CQ (born June 11, 1934) is a Canadian francophone television and radio host and commentator, writer, editor, producer, interviewer and journalist. Born in Kaunas (Lithuania), he immigrated to Montreal in 1951.

== Honours ==
In 1998, he was made a Member of the Order of Canada in recognition for being a "multi-talented individual, who has both entertained and challenged us throughout his career". In 2003, he was made a Knight of the National Order of Quebec.
