= Pierre-Yves Pelletier =

Canadian graphic designer

Pierre-Yves Pelletier is a graphic designer, who has designed 110 stamps for Canada Post. Pierre-Yves Pelletier is half French Canadian. He lives in Belœil, Quebec.

He was Director of Publications for the Organizing Committee of the XXI Olympic Games in Montréal in 1976.

In 1999, he received the Prix Louis-Philippe Beaudoin award.
