= Hlk'yah G̱awG̱a =

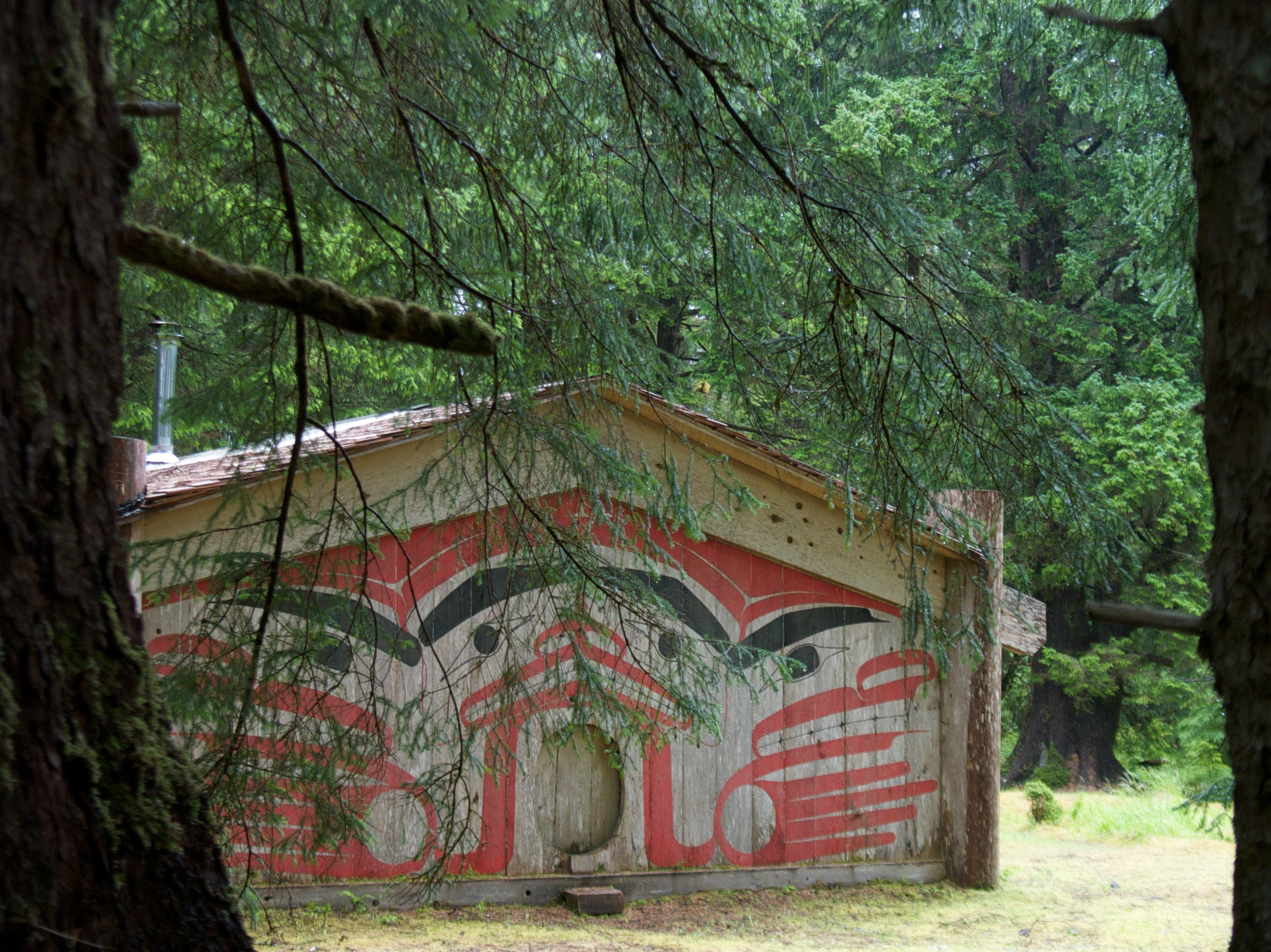
Looking Around and Blinking House at Hlk'yah Gawga (Windy Bay)

Hlk'yah G̱awG̱a, also known as Windy Bay, is located on Athlii Gwaii (Lyell Island) in southern Haida Gwaii, British Columbia. The site was historically the location of a Haida village named Hlk'yah Llnagaay, meaning Peregrine Falcon Town in English. In the 1980s, Hlk'yah G̱awG̱a was the focus of a series of lawsuits and protests opposing clearcut logging on the island. These demonstrations were the impetus for the signing of the Gwaii Haanas Agreement of 1993 and the creation of the Gwaii Haanas National Park Reserve, National Marine Conservation Area Reserve, and Haida Heritage Site.

To commemorate the 20th anniversary of the Gwaii Haanas Agreement, the Legacy Pole was raised at Hlk'yah G̱awG̱a in the summer of 2013. The pole was carved by Jaalen Edenshaw, of the Ts'aahl Clan.

== History ==
Hlk'yah G̱awG̱a was once the site of Hlk'yah Llnagaay, a Haida village and later a seasonal site for summer activities. The large and plentiful cedar trees surrounding the village provided the Haida who lived there with many medicinal, cultural, and utilitarian materials. Today, many of these culturally modified trees can be seen at Hlk'yah G̱awG̱a. The village was situated on a river, which provided fish and water fowl for sustenance and remains culturally significant to the Haida today.

In 1987, a longhouse named Looking Around and Blinking House was built at Hlk'yah G̱awG̱a. Designed by Haida carver and activist Guujaaw and painted by Haida artist Robert Davidson, the longhouse provided a gathering place for Haida protesters who were forming road blockades in an attempt to stop logging on the island.

== Logging protests ==
In 1974, logging company ITT-Rayonier delivered a project proposal to the Ministry of Forests which included a 5-year logging plan in the southern archipelago of Haida Gwaii. The proposal was met with swift opposition by the Haida, initiated in large part by Guujaaw, and non-Haida living on Haida Gwaii. The logging proposal, which was originally set for parts of the South Moresby Area including Burnaby Island, was stopped and the government of British Columbia offered the use of Ahtlii Gwaii instead. Over the next several years, the Haida created several petitions, committees, and partnerships in an attempt to stop the logging on Athlii Gwaii.

In 1985, after repeated attempts to stop logging proved unsuccessful, the Council of the Haida Nation decided to take direct action by forming a blockade on Athlii Gwaii. The blockades and protests continued for over a year, and resulted in the arrest by the Royal Canadian Mounted Police of 72 Haida.

=== Media and protest attention ===
The campaign to protect Lyell Island from logging received international media attention with the support of individuals like David Suzuki and his show The Nature of Things, that featured Hlk'yah G̱awG̱a on national television in January 1982. In 1986, a cross-country media campaign began in which the South Moresby Caravan travelled from St. John's Newfoundland to Vancouver, with public stops, concerts, and fundraising events along the way.

During the protests, the Loo Taas, a canoe carved by Haida artist and carver Bill Reid of the Kaadaas gaah Kiiguwaay clan was paddled 600 miles from Vancouver to Skidegate. The journey garnered national media attention on not only the journey itself but also the blockades on Athlii Gwaii.

=== Aftermath ===
As a result of pressure stemming from the media's coverage of the logging protests on Athlii Gwaii, Canada and the Province of British Columbia’s governments entered into negotiations with the Council of the Haida Nation in 1987. In 1988, the South Moresby Agreement was signed, designating Gwaii Haanas as a national park reserve. In 1993, the Gwaii Haanas Agreement was signed by the Council of the Haida Nation and the Government of Canada. This agreement acknowledged the two governments' differing viewpoints regarding ownership of the lands constituting Gwaii Haanas, yet found common ground in the desire of both parties to protect and care for it. As a result, the two governments agreed to co-manage the land of the Gwaii Haanas National Park Reserve and Haida Heritage Site, and committed to creating a marine agreement in the future. In 2009, the Kunst’aa Guu–Kunst’aayah Reconciliation Protocol was formed, which outlined Haida and Crown land titles, and in 2010 the Gwaii Haanas Marine Agreement was ratified to protect the marine ecosystem of southern Haida Gwaii.

Of those who were arrested during the blockades, 10 were convicted of mischief according to Section 387 of the Canadian Criminal Code. However, none served any jail time.

== Legacy pole ==
In celebration of the 20th anniversary of the Gwaii Haanas Agreement, the Gwaii Haanas Legacy Pole, carved by Jaalen Edenshaw of the Ts'aahl Clan, was raised at Hlk'yah G̱awG̱a on August 15, 2013. Over 400 people participated in the ceremony, and another 400 bore witness via livestream from Skidegate. It was the first raising of a monumental Haida pole in Gwaii Haanas in over 130 years.

The symbols represented in the Legacy Pole highlight different elements of the Gwaii Haanas agreement. Following from the base to the top, the symbols are as follows:

- Grizzly bear and sculpin: the grizzly bear honours oral histories and archeological evidence of their presence on Haida Gwaii, and the sculpin represents the sea.
- "5 Good People Standing Together": these honour those who protected Athlii Gwaii against logging and those who worked to protect Gwaii Haanas as a whole.
- Raven: one of the two Haida moieties. Eagle, the second moiety, appears at the top of the pole.
- Sacred One Standing and Moving: the Supernatural being who holds up Haida Gwaii, and he causes earthquakes when he moves.
- Wasco: a Supernatural sea-wolf.
- Dog, marten, and visitor: the dog is an allusion to a recent archeological find of domesticated dog bones dating back over 14,000 years, evidence that human beings have lived in Haida Gwaii for as long. The marten runs up the pole and creates the sound that comes before a large earthquake, and the visitor represents those who come to visit Gwaii Haanas.
- Three watchmen: Traditionally, these figures were carved to protect against attacks by watching up and down the coast and out to sea. In 1985, the title was used by groups of Haida travelling to old village sites to protect them from logging. Today, the symbol was adopted by the Haida Gwaii Watchmen Program, a Haida-led group of guardians who spend their summers on the village sites of Gwaii Haanas to ensure that visitors leave no traces of their passing.
- Eagle: the second of the two Haida moieties, the Eagle symbolizes the sky.

The presence of the Eagle at the top of the pole and the sculpin at its bottom represent the fact that Gwaii Haanas is protected from the ocean floor to the mountaintops.
