= Hotspring Island =

Coordinates: 52°35′00″N 131°26′00″W

Hotspring Island, originally named in English as Volcanic Island and known in the Haida language as G̱andll K'in Gwaayaay ("Hot-Water-Island"), is a small island near the southeast coast of Lyell Island in the Haida Gwaii archipelago of the North Coast of British Columbia, Canada. The island's names derive from a hot spring located on its southwestern end, the temperature of which has been measured at 72 °C (162 °F). The island is part of Gwaii Haanas National Park Reserve and Haida Heritage Site and is supervised by the Haida Gwaii Watchmen.

== History ==
There had once been a Haida village on the island, but little is known of it. Fur trade captain Joseph Ingraham noted steam from the springs when he sailed in the area in 1791 and named it "Smokey Bay". Chief Klue of Tanu escorted a James Poole to the site in 1863 and extolled the value of the "miracle waters" in spite of fears by other Haida of "the Island of Fire". The name "Hotspring Island" was conferred by George M. Dawson when he went ashore there in 1878.

Due to a 7.8 magnitude earthquake on October 27, 2012, the hot spring stopped flowing and was dry as of November 2012. Some experts, including UBC seismologist Michael Bostock, suggested in 2012 that the hot spring may resume flowing sometime in the future, which it did in 2015.

== Facilities ==
Access to the site is by permit only, usually as part of a tour. Haida Watchmen are posted at the site, as at other locations in the archipelago. There is a bathhouse with a metal tub, fed by the springs, in which visitors are asked to clean themselves before entering the pools proper.
