= Lyell Island =

Island in British Columbia, Canada

Lyell
Haida: Athili Gwaii
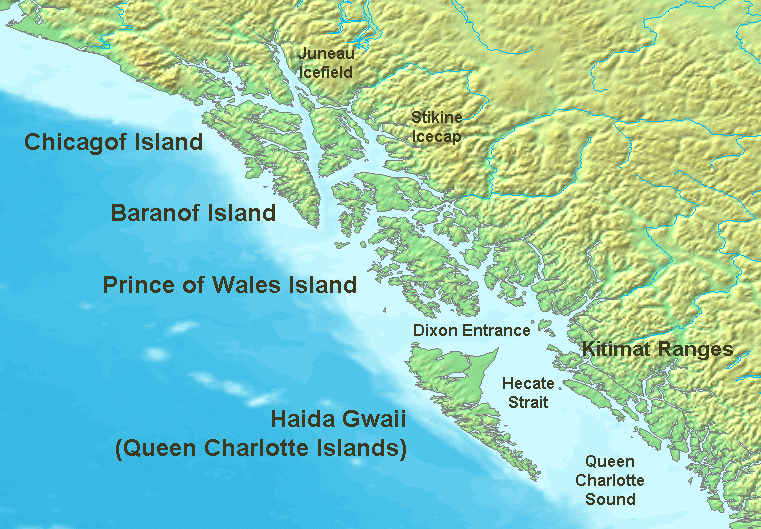
- The northern Pacific Northwest Coast, showing the position of the archipelago in relation to other islands in the region. The southern half of Prince of Wales Island is Kaigani Haida territory, but is not commonly included in the term Haida Gwaii.

Geography
- Location: Coast of British Columbia
- Coordinates: 52°40′00″N 131°30′00″W
- Archipelago: Queen Charlotte Islands
- Area: 176 km^{2} (68 sq mi)

Administration
- Canada

Lyell Island, known also in the Haida language as Athlii Gwaii, is a large island in the Haida Gwaii archipelago on the North Coast of British Columbia, Canada. It is located on the east side of Moresby Island, just south of Laskeek Bay. The island is a part of the Gwaii Haanas National Park Reserve and Haida Heritage Site.

Lyell Island was the focus of anti-logging demonstrations that led to establishment of Gwaii Haanas park in 1993. 72 Haida citizens were arrested by the RCMP and charged with Contempt of Court. Also arrested on Lyell Island was a Canadian MP, Svend Robinson. The protests started October 24, 1985, and continued for three months and eventually led to the process which culminated in the creation of Gwaii Haanas.

== See also ==
- Council of the Haida Nation
- Dené–Yeniseian languages
- Guujaaw
- Haida Gwaii: On the Edge of the World
- Haida language
- Hlk'yah G̱awG̱a (Windy Bay)
- Indigenous peoples of Siberia
- Lohafex
- Moresby Camp
- List of islands of British Columbia, Canada
- List of islands of British Columbia
- The Stand (2024 film)
- Haida Gwaii
