= Gidansda Guujaaw =

Haida president, activist and woodcarver

7th President of the Haida Nation
- In office January 20, 1999 – November 16, 2012
- Vice President: Harold Yeltatzie
- Preceded by: Ron Brown Jr
- Succeeded by: Kil tlaats 'gaa (Peter Lantin)
- In office January 20, 1999 – January 20, 2003
- Vice President: Arnie Bellis
- In office January 20, 2004 – January 20, 2010
- Vice President: Xiihliikingang (April Churchill)
- In office January 20, 2011 – January 20, 2012

Personal details
- Born: Gidansda Giindajin Haawasti Guujaaw; January 1, 1953 (age 73) Massett, Haida Gwaii
- Relations: Gwaai Edenshaw (son)

Gidansda Giindajin Haawasti Guujaaw, also known as Gary Edenshaw, (born 1953), is a Haida environmental and political activist and leader, singer, dancer and artist. He is a hereditary chief of the Haida Nation of Haida Gwaii, in British Columbia, Canada, and was president of the Council of the Haida Nation for four terms, from 1999 to 2012. He is a special advisor to the Coastal First Nations. He has been called a "Haida icon" and "the Heartbeat of the Haida Nation".

== Family ==
Guujaaw is a Haida matrilineally descended from Gakyaals Kiiqawaay, a family of the Raven moiety from the village of Skedans (Ḵ'uuna). He inherited the name Gidansda from his potlatch in 2017, the title of Gakyaals Kiiqawaay hereditary leader. The family's alternate name, "Skedans", is an anglicized mispronunciation of the family's hereditary leader's title. Guujaaw was born in Masset, named G̱aaw in Haida, in the northern part of Haida Gwaii. His father, Chiits Gitnaii, is matrilineally descended from the Eagle moiety from the Yakoun River. Guujaaw means drum; this was a name given to him at a potlatch. Guujaaw learnt traditional dance, oral stories and canoeing from his great-grandmother and other Haida elders.

== Activism, craft and leadership ==
From the 1970s, Guujaaw worked to protect Gwaii Haanas from logging activity. He was one of the leaders of the fight for the protection of Gwaii Haanas National Park Reserve and Haida Heritage Site (South Moresby) and took part in the blockades of logging operations at Lyell Island in the mid-1980s. He has supported protection of the black bears of Haida Gwaii. He influenced David Suzuki, who said "Guujaaw changed the way I viewed the world and sent me on a radically different course of environmentalism".

Guujaaw participated in the revival of Haida songs and dances and traditional arts such as the building of canoes, longhouses and coppers. He was an assistant to Haida wood carver Bill Reid. He has made totem poles; one was commissioned by the Canadian government in 1997 as a gift to Indonesia. A drum he made is in the Haida Gwaii Museum.

Guujaaw was one of the founders of the Council of the Haida Nation in 1974. He became president of the council in 1999. The council filed one of the first Aboriginal Title Cases, and has moved Canadian Aboriginal law through the "Haida Taku" Case. He has written for the council's publication, Haida Laas. In June 2006, he was presented with the Buffett Award for Indigenous Leadership in recognition of his work for the political, cultural and environmental advancement of the Haida nation. The same month he and a group of others from Haida participated in the First International Forum of United Indigenous Peoples, held in Pau, France.

In December 2012, Guujaaw announced that he would not run again as president of the Council of the Haida Nation. He stayed on the council as the Skidegate representative. He is a special advisor to the Coastal First Nations.

== Media appearances ==
Guujaaw has appeared on Sesame Street with Haida child dancers, on the Canadian Broadcasting Corporation programme On The Road Again in 1991, and in a BBC documentary, Islands of the People, in 1986.

== Personal life ==
Guujaaw is married to Jenny Nelson, and they have children. His son Gwaai Edenshaw is an artist and film director, and co-director of the first Haida-language feature-length film Edge of the Knife (SG̲aawaay Ḵʹuuna).
