= Haida Gwaii Watchmen =

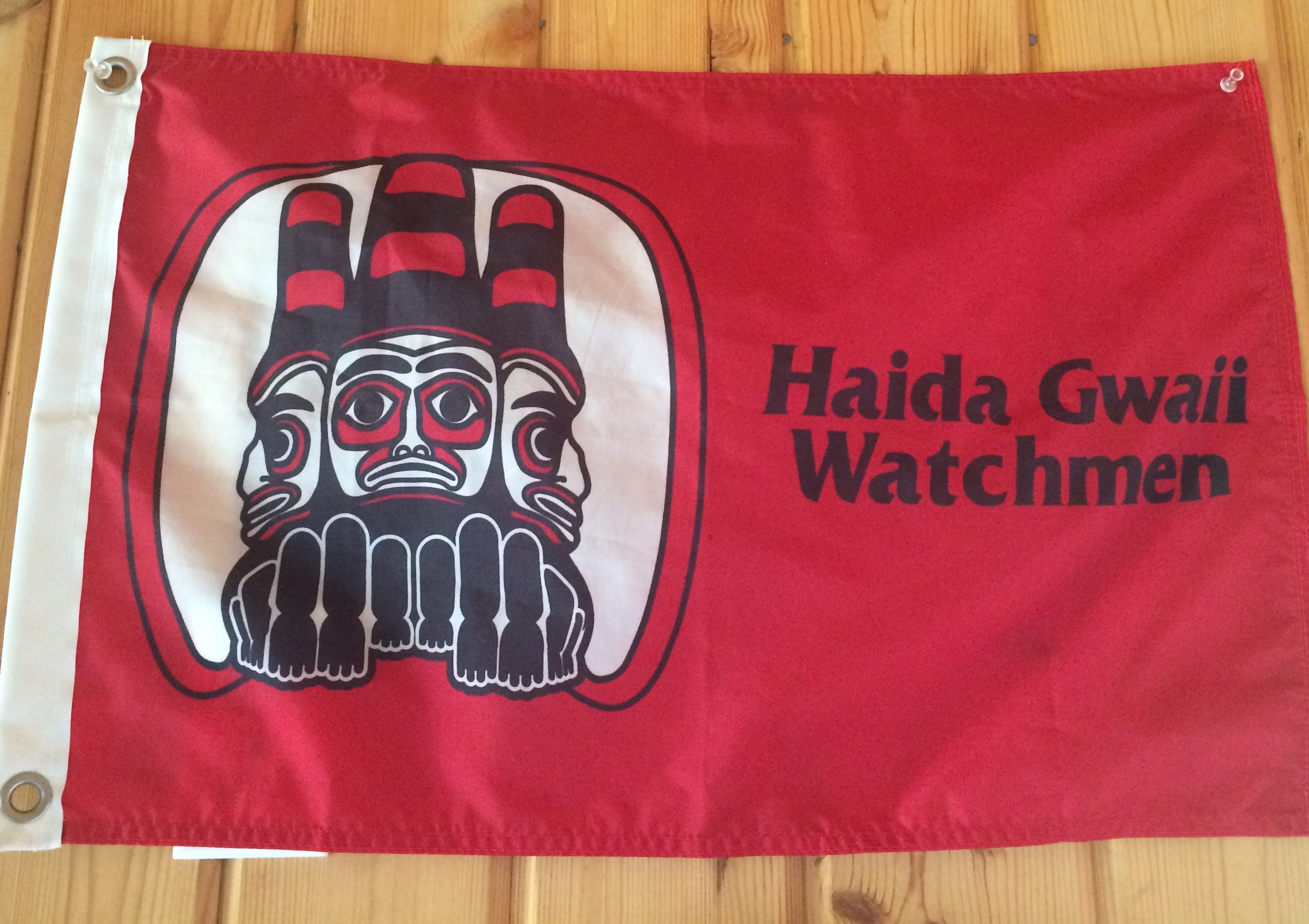
Haida Gwaii Watchmen Logo

The Haida Gwaii Watchmen Program encourages young Haida to work alongside elders to protect and teach visitors about Gwaii Haanas National Park Reserve and Haida Heritage Site. The program is co-managed by the Council of the Haida Nation and Parks Canada. The Watchmen ensure that Haida cultural, historical, and natural tourism stays in the hands of the Haida people. The program consists of 2-4 Watchmen who live and work as guardians, watching over each site in Gwaii Haanas. Three human figure with traditional Haida hats represent the Haida Watchmen.

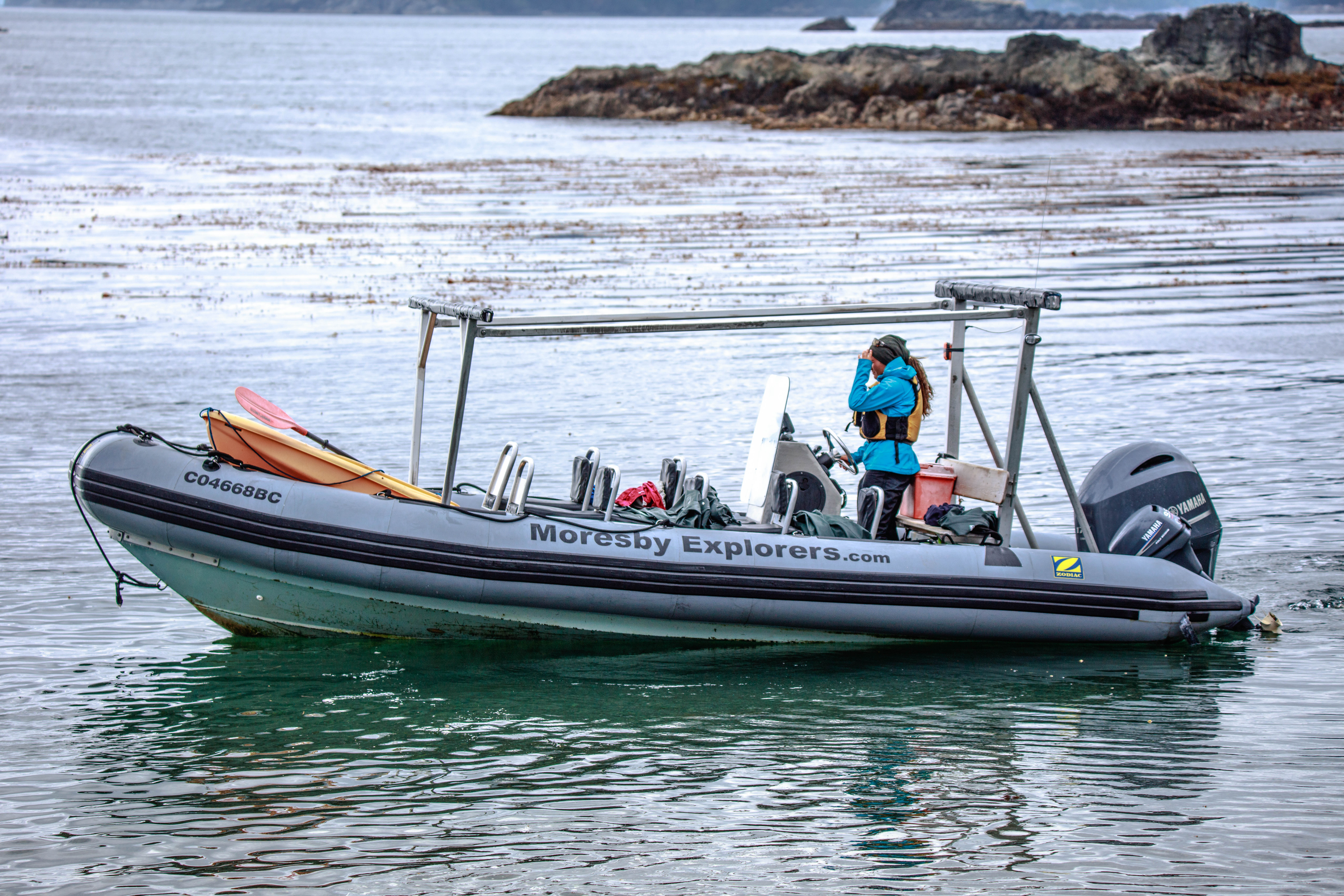

== History ==
The Haida people have been living in Haida Gwaii for at least 14000 years and the Watchmen have been around for just as long. Historically, the job of a Watchman was to be positioned at important locations throughout the community to watch out for incoming enemies by land or sea. They are represented typically by 3 heads atop of a totem pole to protect the land, sea, and sky.

In 1973, a Haida named Captain Gold (Richard Wilson) paddled his canoe 250 km to SGang Gwaay where he went to honour his ancestors. At this time, the site was often looted for artifacts and the lands disrespected by logging companies. Upon realizing how important protecting these lands would be, he founded the first modern iteration of the Watchmen program, starting with a hand-built cabin which Gold constructed himself in 1980. The Skidegate Band Council officially created the program in 1981 and included Captain Gold and other members who volunteered their time camping at the various sites that needed protecting. From 1981 to 1990, the program was run solely on a volunteer basis by the Skidegate Band Council and the Watchmen themselves were made up of council members and Elders. In 1990, Parks Canada officially begun funding and co-managing the Watchmen.

Started by Gold, Haida would be employed from Skidegate and Masset in order to be trained for shrub and tree removal.

== Modern program ==
Since the early 1990s, 2-4 Watchmen have been hired each summer to live at each of the sites, where they stay up to four months, acting as stewards of the historic sites and provide historical knowledge and tourist information to visitors. Multiple generations will work in the program, which allows traditional knowledge and history to be passed from Elder to younger Haida members in order to maintain their culture and way of life. During the winter months, the cabins at each site will remain unlocked in case there is an urgent need to access them.

The logo for the Watchmen Program was created by Bill Reid to replicate the original totem pole symbol.

=== Conservation Efforts ===
Working within the National Park Reserve and surrounding sites, the Watchmen's main job is to minimize the environmental impact tourism has on the environment. As the Watchmen totem pole symbolism promotes, the modern-day Watchmen ensure that the land, sea, and coastlines are protected and respected at all times. Some conservation and restoration activities performed by the Watchmen include:

- Site Cleaning
- Debris Burning
- Trail Maintenance
- Camp Maintenance
- Conducting Boat Counts
- Creel Monitoring

=== Traditional Knowledge Sharing ===
Part of the draw of the Watchmen program is that it allows Haida people to be in control of sharing their culture and traditional ways with visitors to the sites.

== Reserve sites ==
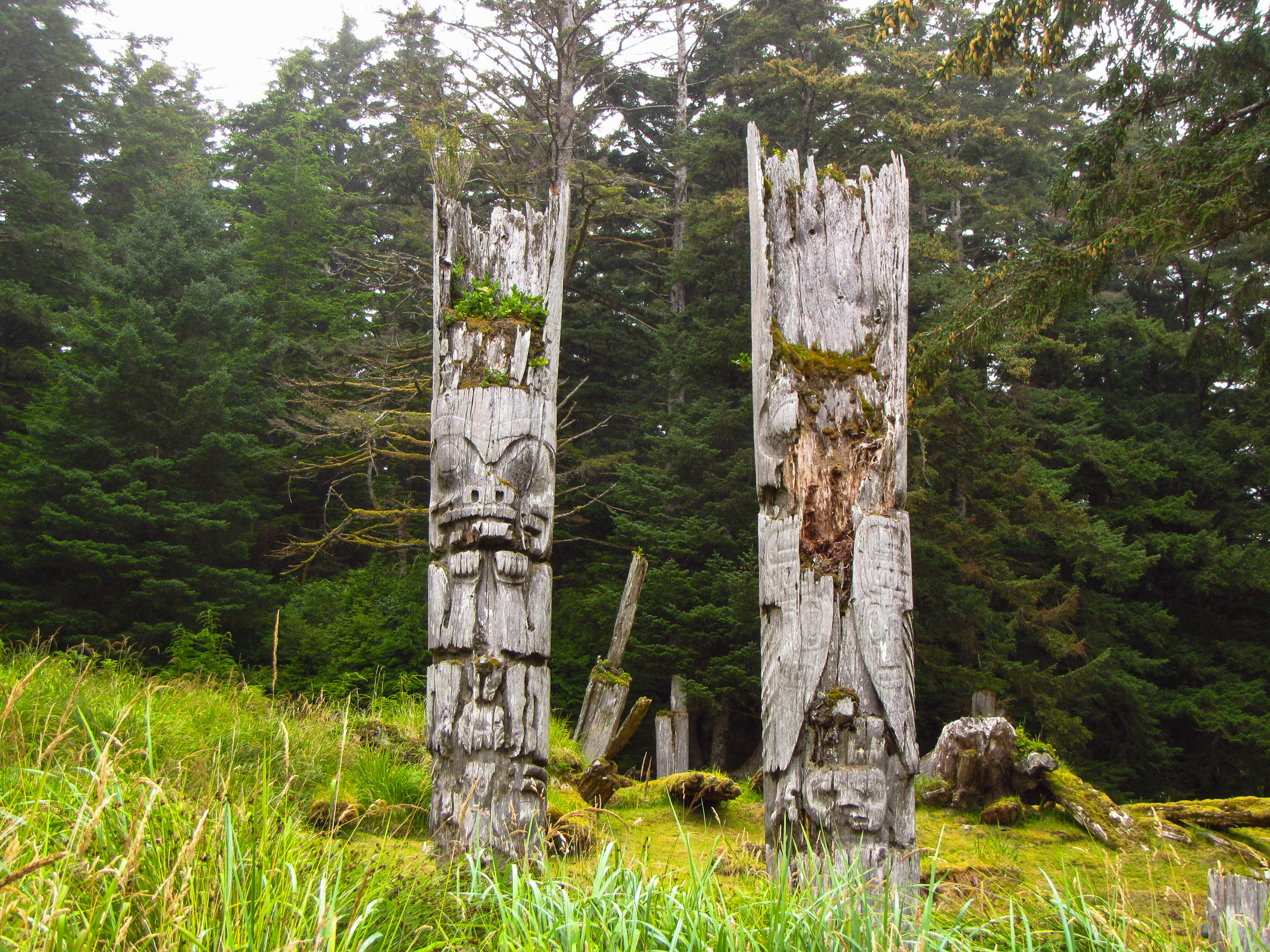
Sgang Gwaii Totem Pole Ruins

In 1993, the Government of Canada and the Council of the Haida Nation signed the Gwaii Haanas Agreement, establishing co-management of Gwaii Haanas National Park Reserve and Heritage Site .

=== Watchmen Sites ===
There are currently 5 Watchmen Sites on Haida Gwaii. They include:

==== Hlk’yah Gaw Ga (Windy Bay) ====
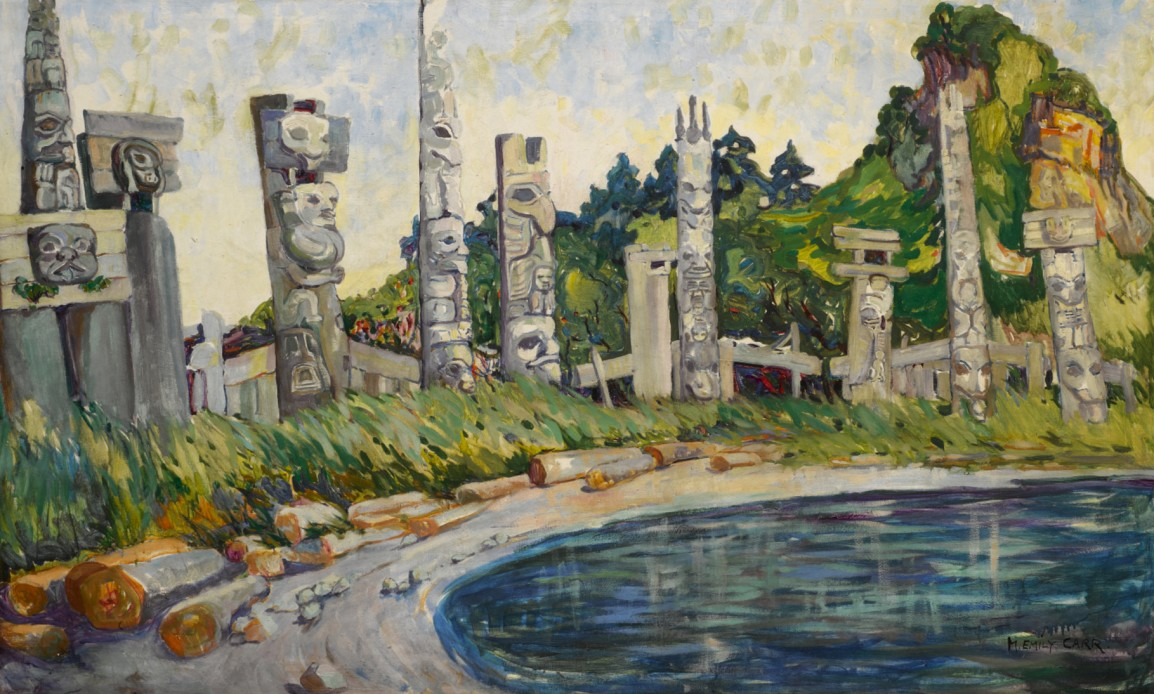
Skedans in 1912, painted by Emily Carr

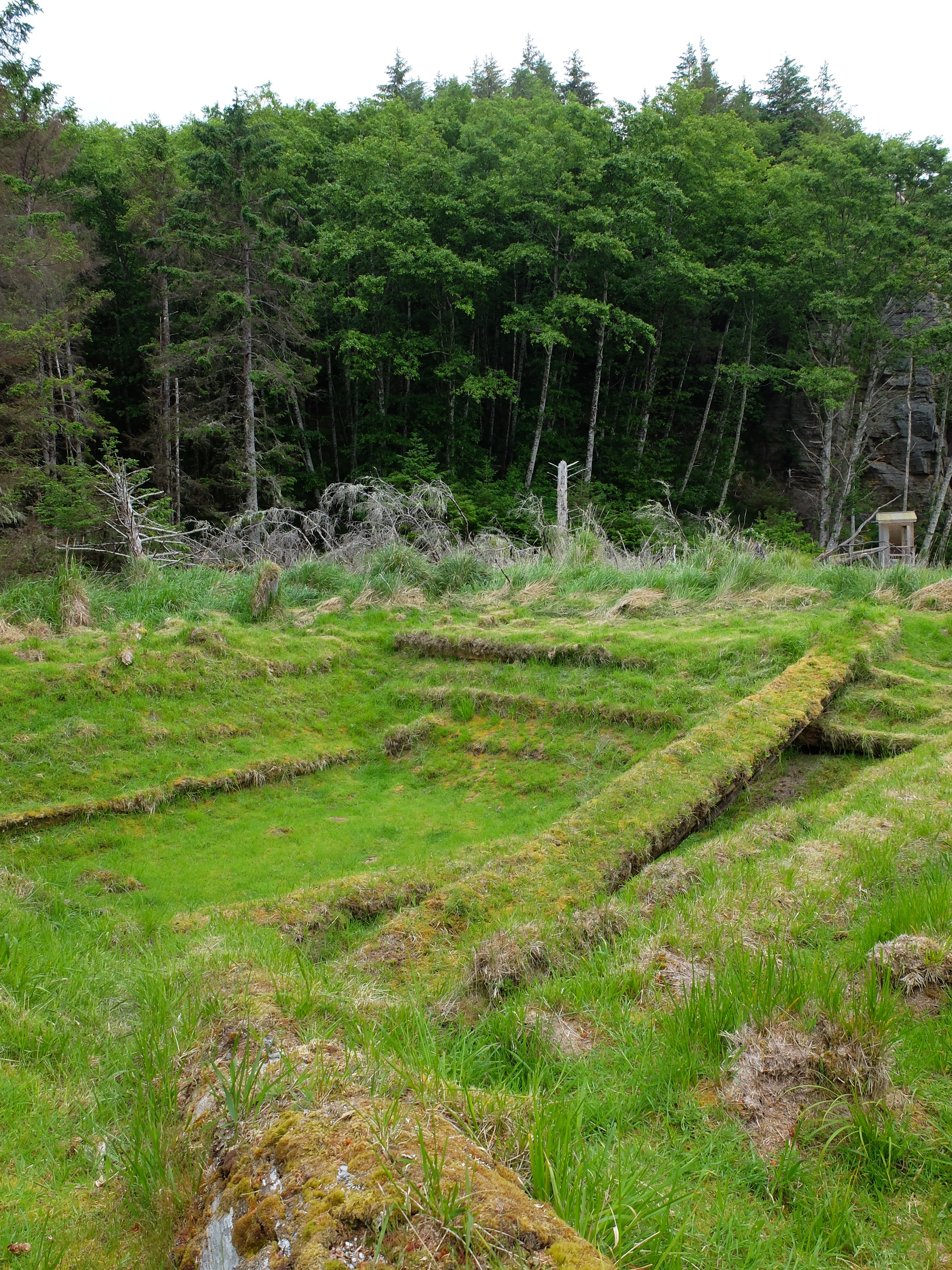
Longhouse ruins in Skedans

=== World Heritage Site Status ===
In 1980, Parks Canada's Special Advisor, Peter Bennett visited the site and decided to nominate Gwaii Hanaas as a World Heritage Site. In 1981, the park received official status as a World Heritage Site, where SGang Gwaay being the first living cultural site. Gwaii Hanaas National Park Reserve and Haida Heritage Site were officially established in 1993 by the Council of the Haida Nation and Parks Canada.
