= Burnaby Island =

Island in Canada

Burnaby
- Interactive map of Burnaby

Geography
- Location: North Coast of British Columbia
- Coordinates: 52°23′00″N 131°19′00″W
- Archipelago: Haida Gwaii

Administration
- Canada

Burnaby Island is an island in Haida Gwaii off the north coast of British Columbia, Canada, located off the southeast coast of Moresby Island. It is part of the Gwaii Haanas National Park Reserve and Haida Heritage Site.

The island was named in 1862 for Robert Burnaby, also the namesake of Burnaby Lake and the City of Burnaby.

== See also ==
- List of islands of British Columbia
