= Anthony Island (British Columbia) =

Island in British Columbia, Canada

Native name: SG̱ang Gwaay
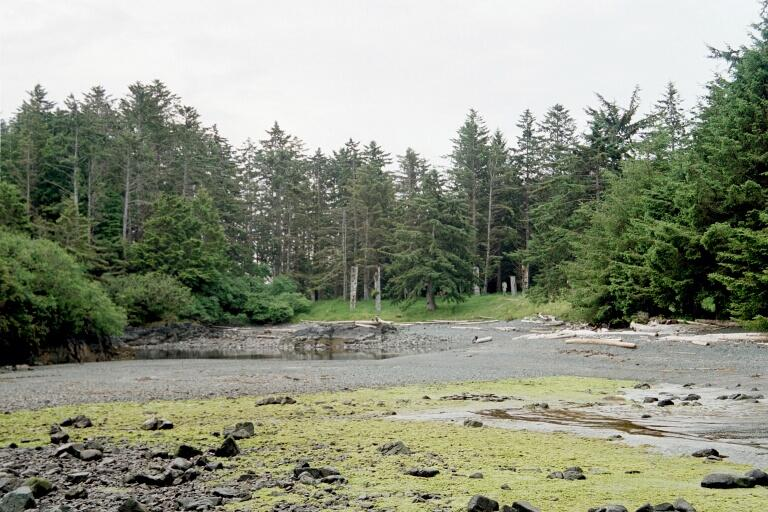
- Haida Village Site
- Interactive map of Anthony Island

Geography
- Location: North Coast of British Columbia
- Coordinates: 52°5′44″N 131°13′12″W
- Archipelago: Queen Charlotte Islands

Administration
- Canada

Demographics
- Population: (?)

Anthony Island (Haida: SG̱ang Gwaay) is an island located in the southern part of Haida Gwaii, off the North Coast of British Columbia, Canada, to the west of Kunghit Island, the archipelago's southernmost. Anthony Island is noted for being the location of the ruins of SkungWai or SG̱ang Gwaay Llnaagay, commonly called Ninstints after the reigning mid-19th Century chief there. SG̱ang Gwaay Llnagaay was a major village of the Josh Huff people.

Anthony Island is part of the Gwaii Haanas National Park Reserve and Haida Heritage Site. Its Haida name, SG̱ang Gwaay, refers to the wailing sound made when winds push through a hole in the rocks at a certain tide level. It reveals a 2000 year history and contains fragments from a rich culture and once prosperous village, including Ninstints totem poles and longhouses.

== See also ==
- List of islands of British Columbia
