= Moresby Camp =

Settlement in Haida Gwaii, British Columbia, Canada

Coordinates: 53°03′00″N 132°03′00″W

Location of Moresby Camp in British Columbia

Moresby Camp is a settlement on Moresby Island in the Haida Gwaii archipelago in British Columbia.

== Climate ==
Climate data for Pallant Creek/Moresby Camp
Month	Jan	Feb	Mar	Apr	May	Jun	Jul	Aug	Sep	Oct	Nov	Dec	Year
Record high °C (°F)	16.0 (60.8)	16.0 (60.8)	16.5 (61.7)	22.5 (72.5)	27.5 (81.5)	30.5 (86.9)	31.5 (88.7)	33.0 (91.4)	28.5 (83.3)	22.0 (71.6)	15.5 (59.9)	14.0 (57.2)	33.0 (91.4)
Mean daily maximum °C (°F)	5.4 (41.7)	6.5 (43.7)	8.2 (46.8)	10.5 (50.9)	14.4 (57.9)	16.7 (62.1)	19.2 (66.6)	20.0 (68.0)	17.3 (63.1)	12.0 (53.6)	7.3 (45.1)	5.1 (41.2)	11.9 (53.4)
Daily mean °C (°F)	2.8 (37.0)	3.4 (38.1)	4.6 (40.3)	6.3 (43.3)	9.5 (49.1)	12.1 (53.8)	14.4 (57.9)	15.0 (59.0)	12.8 (55.0)	8.7 (47.7)	4.6 (40.3)	2.8 (37.0)	8.1 (46.5)
Mean daily minimum °C (°F)	0.2 (32.4)	0.2 (32.4)	0.9 (33.6)	2.1 (35.8)	4.6 (40.3)	7.4 (45.3)	9.6 (49.3)	10.0 (50.0)	8.2 (46.8)	5.2 (41.4)	1.9 (35.4)	0.5 (32.9)	4.2 (39.6)
Record low °C (°F)	−13.5 (7.7)	−14.0 (6.8)	−7.0 (19.4)	−3.5 (25.7)	−2.5 (27.5)	1.5 (34.7)	2.0 (35.6)	3.5 (38.3)	0.0 (32.0)	−7.0 (19.4)	−15.5 (4.1)	−13.5 (7.7)	−15.5 (4.1)
Average precipitation mm (inches)	458.4 (18.05)	309.3 (12.18)	272.0 (10.71)	254.5 (10.02)	134.2 (5.28)	103.1 (4.06)	60.7 (2.39)	107.5 (4.23)	224.0 (8.82)	474.1 (18.67)	493.4 (19.43)	444.7 (17.51)	3,335.9 (131.35)
Average rainfall mm (inches)	436.2 (17.17)	290.2 (11.43)	263.2 (10.36)	251.2 (9.89)	134.1 (5.28)	103.1 (4.06)	60.7 (2.39)	107.5 (4.23)	224.0 (8.82)	473.2 (18.63)	484.9 (19.09)	429.5 (16.91)	3,257.8 (128.26)
Average snowfall cm (inches)	22.2 (8.7)	19.1 (7.5)	8.8 (3.5)	3.0 (1.2)	0.1 (0.0)	0 (0)	0 (0)	0 (0)	0 (0)	0.9 (0.4)	8.5 (3.3)	15.2 (6.0)	77.8 (30.6)
Average precipitation days (≥ 0.2 mm)	23.8	19.1	22.7	21.7	17.6	15.9	14.7	14.9	18.2	25.2	24.5	24.1	242.4
Average rainy days (≥ 0.2 mm)	21.6	16.8	22.0	21.6	17.6	15.9	14.7	14.9	18.2	25.2	23.8	22.1	234.4
Average snowy days (≥ 0.2 cm)	4.6	3.6	2.8	1.4	0.11	0	0	0	0	0.53	2.7	4.3	20.04
Source: Canadian Climate Normals
