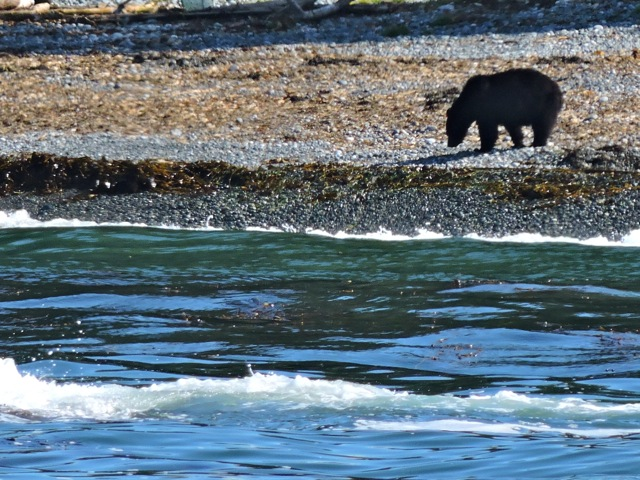
- A black bear in Clayoquot Sound.

Scientific classification
- Kingdom: Animalia
- Phylum: Chordata
- Class: Mammalia
- Order: Carnivora
- Family: Ursidae
- Genus: Ursus
- Species: U. americanus
- Subspecies: U. a. carlottae

Trinomial name
- Ursus americanus carlottae Osgood, 1901
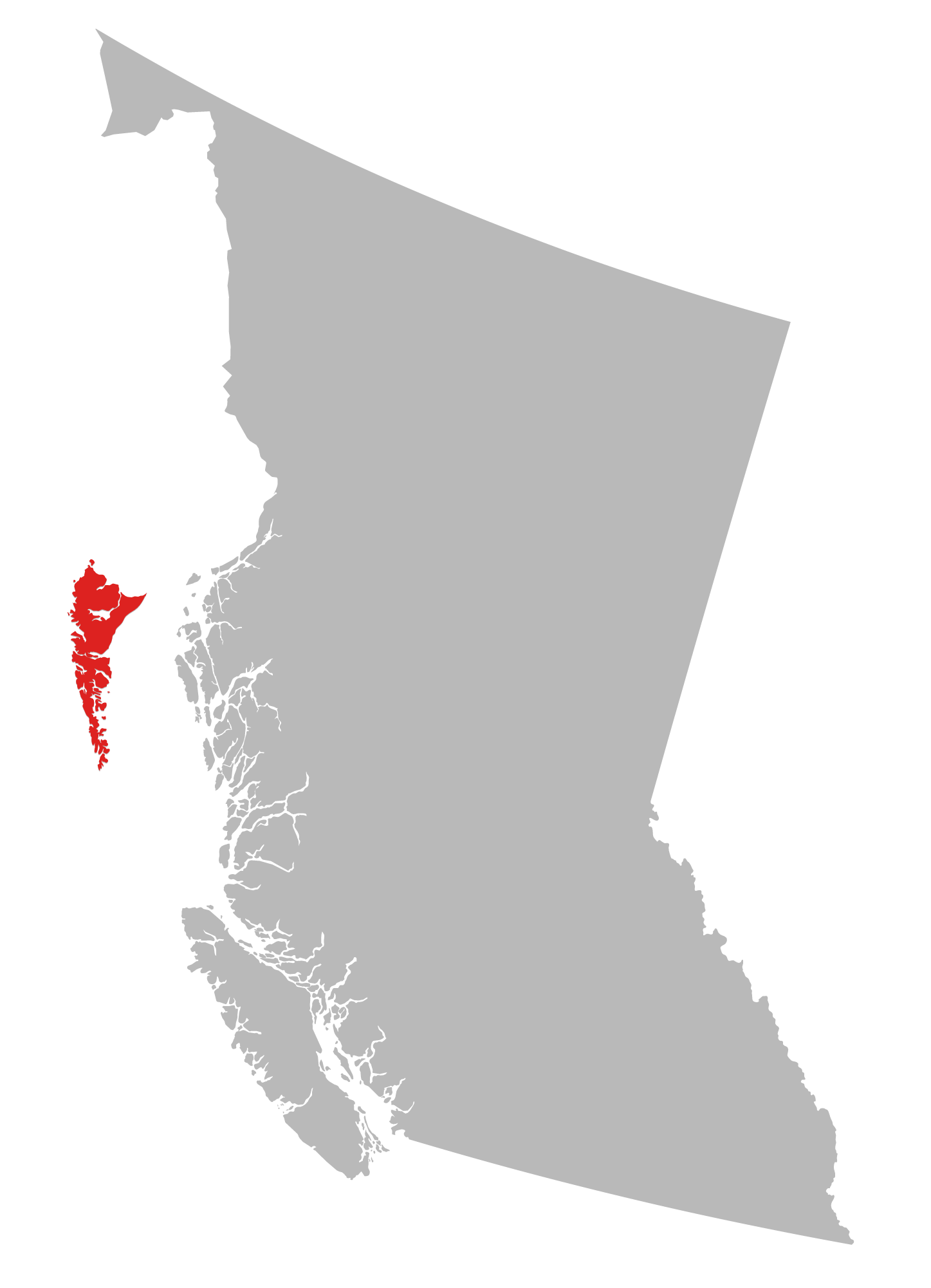

= Ursus americanus carlottae =

Subspecies of carnivore

Ursus americanus carlottae, the Haida Gwaii black bear or Queen Charlotte Islands black bear, is a morphologically distinct subspecies of the American black bear.

== Description ==
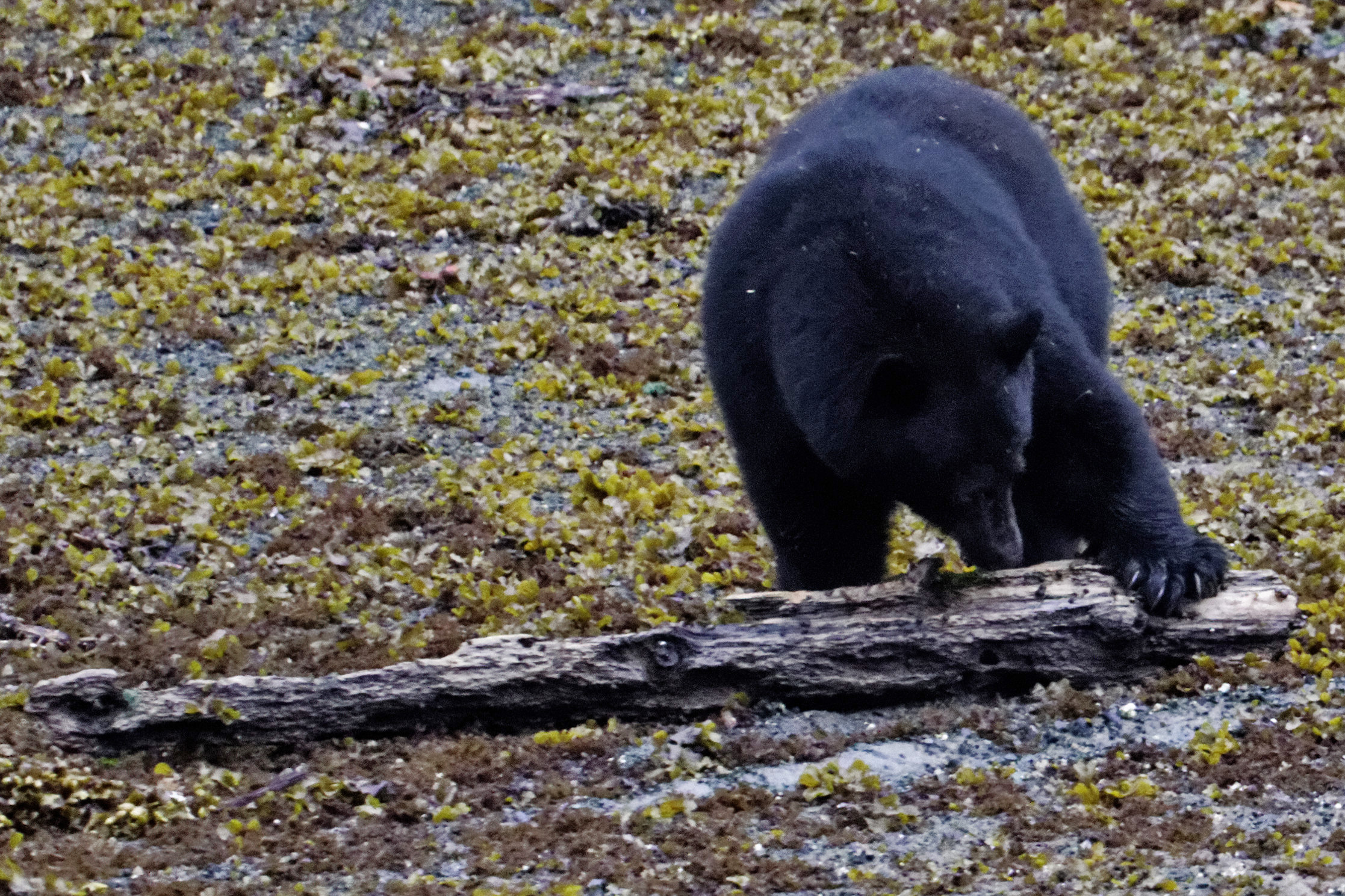
A black bear foraging on the shoreline in Hidden Cove, northern Vancouver Island.

=== Appearance ===
Haida Gwaii black bears are the largest subspecies of American black bear, not only within British Columbia but across North America.

Unlike their mainland counterparts, who come in a variety of colour phases, Haida Gwaii black bears have only ever been reported as having entirely black fur.

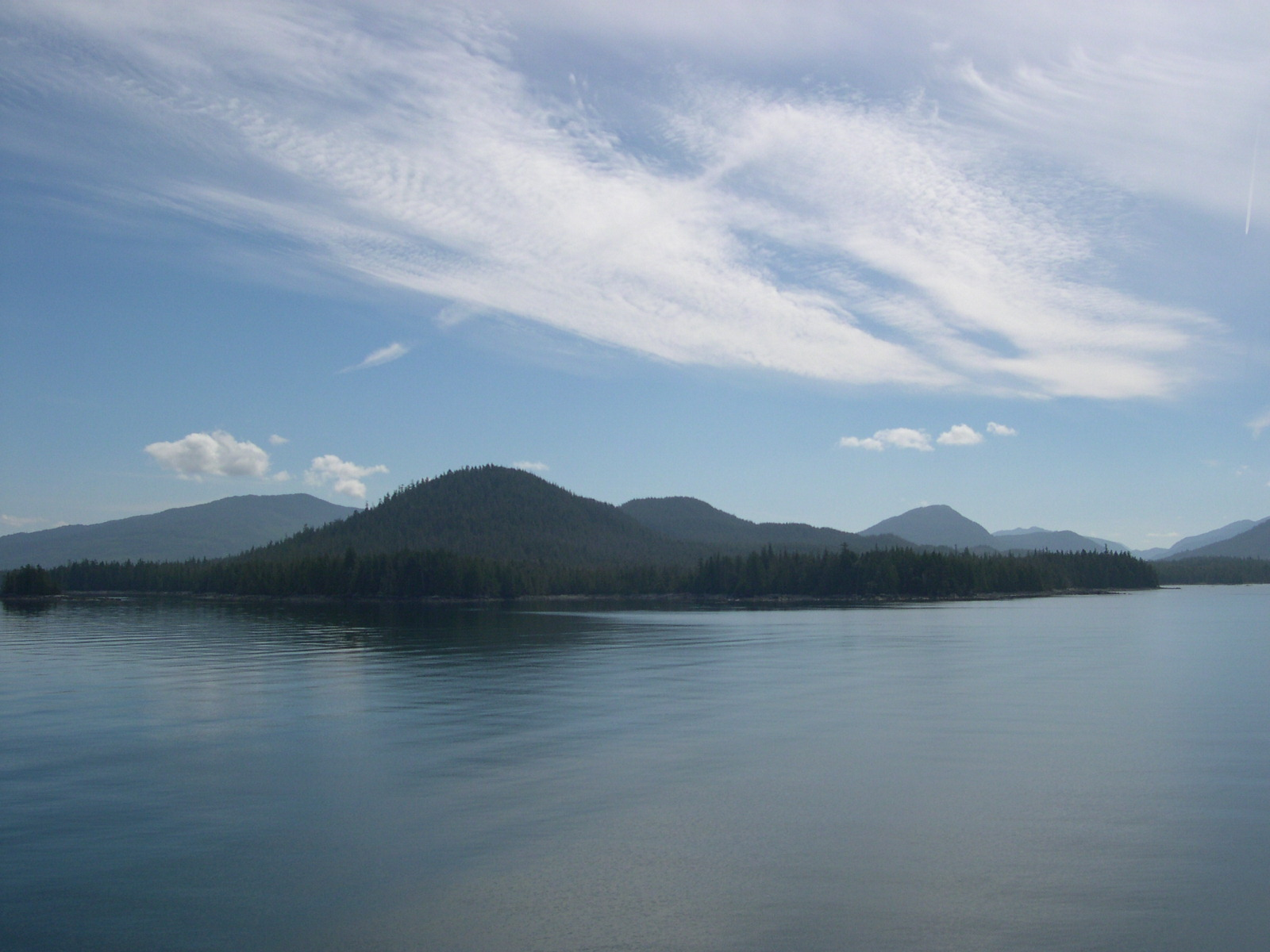
Part of the Haida Gwaii archipelago, as seen from Hecate Strait.

=== Ecology ===
Haida Gwaii black bears are the largest land mammal native to the archipelago, filling the role of top land predator in the area's ecosystem.

Like other black bear subspecies, the bears of Haida Gwaii are omnivorous, often being observed foraging within intertidal zones. To better deal with the tough shells of shellfish such as crabs and mussels, some of their common food sources, the bears developed larger skulls and molars. Within the more inland portions of the islands, Haida Gwaii black bears will feed on vegetation such as ferns, nettles, horsetails and berries.

The bears are considered a keystone species because of their transportation of salmon remains into the surrounding forests while feeding.

Hibernation occurs during the winter, with female bears usually giving birth to between one and three cubs in January, whilst still hibernating. Cubs will stay with their mothers for around a year and a half, before moving off to independence.

=== Cultural significance ===
Haida Gwaii black bears are known as "taan" in the Haida language and feature prominently in Haida mythology.

=== Conservation ===
Although the exact population of Haida Gwaii black bears is not known, over 900 of the bears have been killed by hunters since the late 1970s.

In 1995, The Council of the Haida Nation passed a resolution to halt the recreational hunting of bears within the archipelago, stating that the killing was wasteful and went against Haida ethics. In 2005, both the council and the government of British Columbia agreed the hunt should end. Despite this, hunting of Haida Gwaii black bears continues, albeit under a limited entry form where just four individual bears are allowed to be harvested per year.
