= Haida Gwaii =

Archipelago in British Columbia, Canada

Nickname: "Queen Charlottes" "The Charlottes"
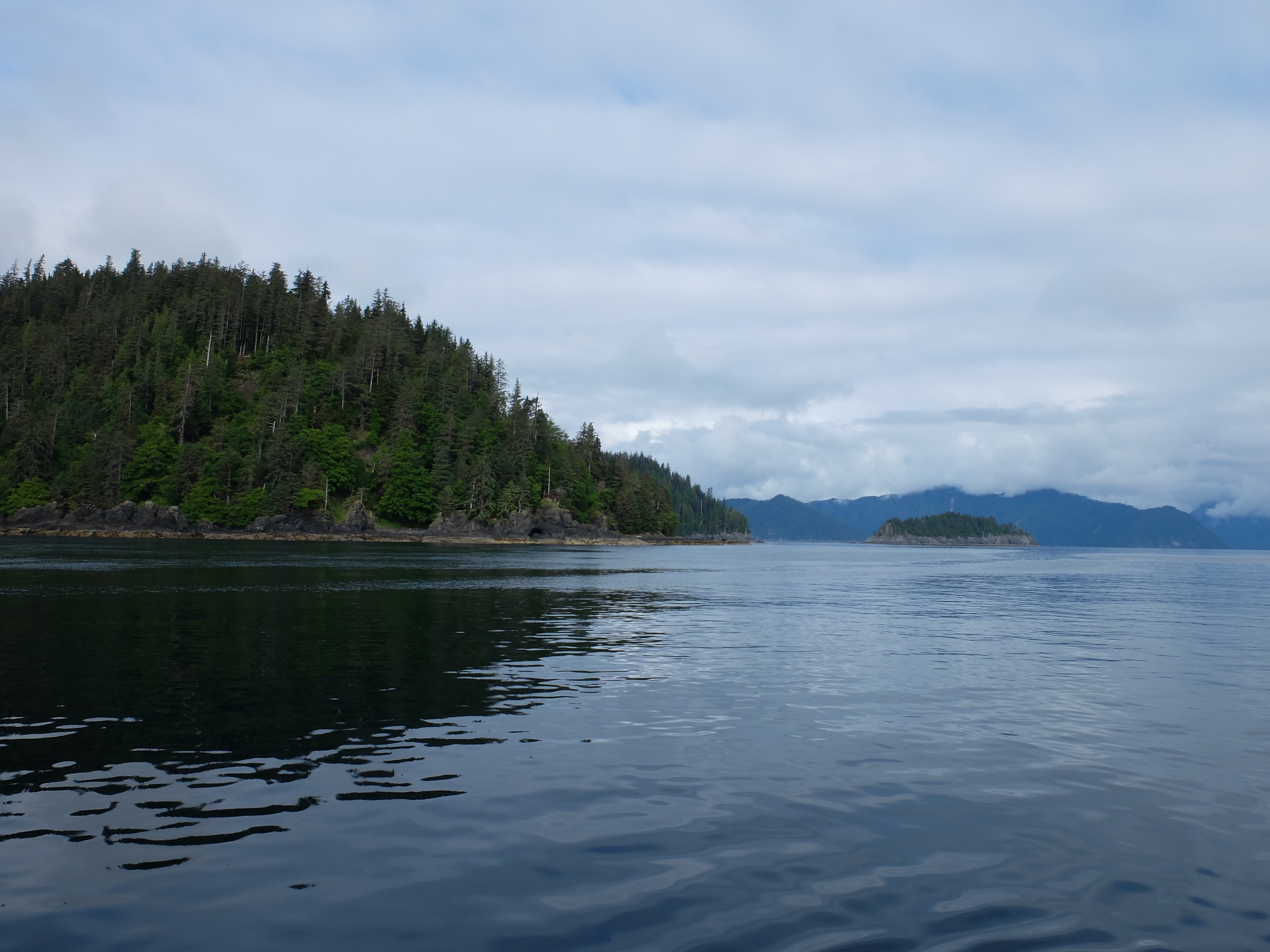
- Gwaii Haanas National Park Reserve

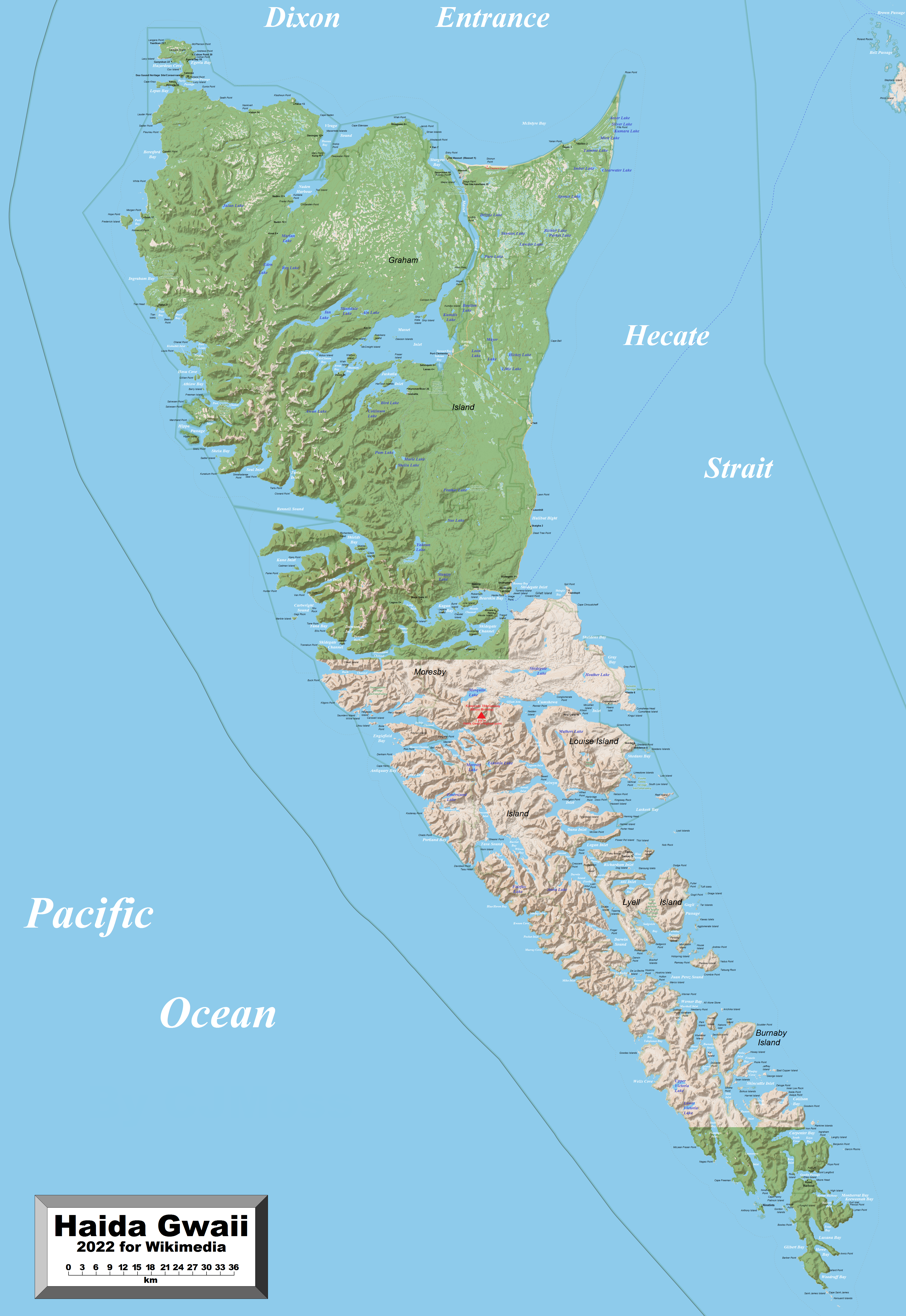
- Map of Haida Gwaii

- Haida Gwaii in British Columbia

Geography
- Location: Pacific Ocean
- Coordinates: 53°N 132°W
- Total islands: c. 150
- Major islands: Graham Island; Moresby Island
- Area: 10,180 km^{2} (3,930 sq mi)
- Highest elevation: 1,164 m (3819 ft)
- Highest point: Mount Moresby
- Canada
- Province: British Columbia
- Largest settlement: Village of Daajing Giids (pop. 964)

Demographics
- Population: 4,526 (2021)
- Pop. density: 0.445/km^{2} (1.153/sq mi)

Additional information
- Time zone: Pacific

Haida Gwaii (/ˈhaɪdə ˈɡwaɪ/; Haida: X̱aaydag̱a Gwaay.yaay / X̱aayda gwaay, literally "Islands of the Haida people"), previously known as the Queen Charlotte Islands, is an archipelago located between 55–125 km (34–78 mi) off the northern Pacific coast in the Canadian province of British Columbia. The islands are separated from the mainland to the east by the shallow Hecate Strait. Queen Charlotte Sound lies to the south, with Vancouver Island beyond. To the north, the disputed Dixon Entrance separates Haida Gwaii from the Alexander Archipelago in the U.S. state of Alaska.

Haida Gwaii consists of two main islands: Graham Island (Kiis Gwaay) in the north and Moresby Island (Haida: T'aawxii X̱aaydag̱a Gwaay.yaay linag̱waay, lit. 'south people island half', or Gwaay Haanas "Islands of Beauty") in the south, along with approximately 400 smaller islands with a total landmass of 10,180 km^{2} (3,931 sq mi). Other major islands include Anthony Island (Sg̱ang Gwaay), Burnaby Island (Sg̱aay Kun Gwaay.yaay), Langara Island (Kiis Gwaay), Lyell Island (Athlii Gwaii), Louise Island, (Ḵ'uuna Gwaay), Alder Island and Kunghit Island (G̱angx̱id Gwaay).

On June 3, 2010, the Haida Gwaii Reconciliation Act formally renamed the archipelago to Haida Gwaii as part of the Kunst'aa guu – Kunst'aayah Reconciliation Protocol between British Columbia and the Haida people. The previous official name was given to the archipelago by British explorer George Dixon in 1787 after Queen Charlotte of Mecklenburg-Strelitz and the islands are known colloquially as "the Charlottes".

The islands, upon which people have lived for 13,000 years, form the heartland of the Haida Nation. Members of the Haida Nation currently make up approximately half of the islands' population. The Council of the Haida Nation (CHN, X̱aaydag̱a Waadlux̱an Naay) was established in 1974 to "strive for full independence, sovereignty and self-sufficiency of the Haida Nation". As recently as 2015, the Haida Nation hosted First Nations delegations such as the potlatch and subsequent treaty signing between the Haida and Heiltsuk Nation. A small number of Kaigani Haida also live on the traditionally Tlingit Prince of Wales Island in Alaska. In a deal negotiated between the government and the Haida nation over the preceding decades, British Columbia in 2024 transferred the title over more than 200 islands off Canada's west coast to the Haida people, recognizing the nation's aboriginal land title throughout Haida Gwaii.

Some of the islands are protected under federal legislation as the Gwaii Haanas National Park Reserve and Haida Heritage Site, which includes the southernmost part of Moresby Island and several adjoining islands and islets. Coastal temperate rain forest at the shore, the preserve also includes the San Cristoval Mountains, so named by the first European explorer, Juan José Pérez Hernández, and the oldest surviving European place name on the BC coast. Facilities are minimal, and access is via boat or seaplane. Also protected, but under provincial jurisdiction, are several provincial parks, the largest of which is Naikoon Provincial Park on northeastern Graham Island. The islands are home to an abundance of wildlife, including many endemic subspecies.

== Transportation ==
There is no public transportation on Haida Gwaii. Taxis and car rentals are available, and shuttles can be arranged.

The primary transportation links between the Islands and mainland British Columbia are through the Sandspit Airport, the Masset Airport and the BC Ferries terminal at Skidegate.

The westernmost leg of Highway 16, a section of the greater Yellowhead Highway, connects Masset and Skidegate on Graham Island, and Skidegate with Prince Rupert on the mainland via regular BC Ferries service by the MV Northern Adventure. Reservations are strongly recommended for the ferry.

There is also regular BC Ferries service between Skidegate and Alliford Bay on Moresby Island. Floatplane services connect to facilities such as the Alliford Bay Water Aerodrome and Masset Water Aerodrome.

There are 120 km (75 mi) of highway on Graham Island. On Moresby, only 20 km (12 mi) of paved road line the coast.

== Economy ==
The economy is mixed, including art and natural resources, primarily logging and commercial fishing. Furthermore, service industries and government jobs provide about one-third of the jobs, and tourism has become a more prominent part of the economy in recent years, especially for fishing and tour guides, cycling, camping, and adventure tourism. Indigenous culture tourism has been enhanced with the establishment of the Haida Heritage Centre at Kaay Ilnygaay.

== Education ==
Public education is provided through School District 50 Haida Gwaii, which operates elementary and secondary schools in Masset, Port Clements, Daajing Giids, Sandspit, and Skidegate. The Old Masset Village Council operates Chief Matthews School, a K/4 through grade 5 (and grade 6 as of the 2023-24 school year) school. Higher education programs are offered at the Haida Heritage Centre in partnership with the University of Northern British Columbia, and with the Haida Gwaii Higher Education Society.

== Health care ==
Publicly funded health services are provided by Northern Health, the regional health authority responsible for the northern half of the province.

Haida Gwaii is served by two hospitals: The Northern Haida Gwaii Hospital and Health Centre opened in 2008, and serves the northern communities of Masset, Old Massett, Port Clements and Tow Hill. The Haida Gwaii Hospital and Health Centre (Haida: Xaayda Gwaay Ngaaysdll Naay) which first opened to patients in November 2016, is located in Daajing Giids and serves patients in the southern communities of Daajing Giids, Skidegate, Sandspit and Tlell.

Haida Gwaii has four British Columbia Ambulance stations. They are staffed by approximately 36 casual emergency medical responders (EMR), and one part-time community paramedic based in Masset.

== Population ==
At the time of European contact in 1774, the population was roughly 30,000 people, residing in several towns and including slave populations drawn from other clans of Haida as well as from other nations. It is estimated that ninety percent of the population died during the 1800s from smallpox alone; other diseases arrived as well, including typhoid, measles, and syphilis, affecting many more inhabitants. The 1862 Pacific Northwest smallpox epidemic alone killed over 70% of the Haida people.

By 1915, only 600 people remained. Towns were abandoned as people left their homes for the towns of Skidegate and Masset, for cannery towns on the mainland, or for Vancouver Island. Today, around 4,500 people live on the islands. About 70% of the Indigenous people (Haida) live in two communities at Skidegate and Old Massett, with a population of about 700 each. In total, the Haida make up 45% of the population of the islands.

Anthony Island and the Ninstints Haida village site were made a UNESCO World Heritage Site in 2006; in the decision, the decline in population wrought by disease was referenced when citing the "vanished civilization" of the Haida.

== History ==
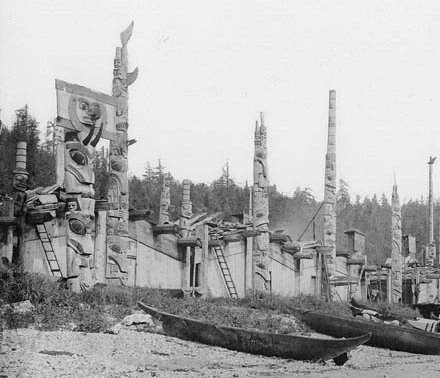
Houses and totem poles, Skidegate, 26 July 1878

Haida Gwaii is considered by archaeologists as an option for a Pacific coastal route taken by the first humans migrating to the Americas from the Bering Strait. At this time, Haida Gwaii was likely not an island; instead, it was connected to Vancouver Island and the mainland via the now-submerged continental shelf.

It is unclear how people arrived on Haida Gwaii; however, archaeological sites have established human habitation on the islands as far back as 13,000 years ago. Populations that formerly inhabited Beringia expanded into northern North America after the Last Glacial Maximum, and gave rise to Eskimo-Aleuts and Na-Dené Indians.

Although unsubstantiated, an oral tradition told by the Haida Chief, Albert Edward Edenshaw, says that the Haida came from northern Alaska and travelled to Haida Gwaii in search of new territory.

Underwater archaeologists from the University of Victoria are seeking to confirm that stone structures discovered in 2014 on the seabed of Hecate Strait may date back 13,700 or more years ago and be the earliest known signs of human habitation in Canada. Coastal sites of this era are now deep underwater.

=== Pre-colonial era ===
The coastal migration hypothesis of the settlement of the Americas suggests that the first North Americans may have been here (when?) as the oldest human remains known from Alaska or Canada are from On Your Knees Cave. Anthropologists have found striking parallels between the myths, rituals, and dwelling types of the Koryaks—inhabitants of the Kamchatka Peninsula—and those of the native peoples of the Pacific Northwest Coast. At this time the island was twice as large as today. There is strong genetic evidence for these early people having an origin there. The Koryaks were a matrilineal seafaring people hunting whales and other marine mammals. Kujkynnjaku, the Raven, is their primary deity. Most of the Raven myths are similar to those of the Koryak.

The group of people inhabiting these Islands developed a culture made rich by the abundance of the land and sea. These people became the Haida. The Haida are a linguistically-distinct group, and they have a complex class and rank system consisting of two main clans, the Eagles and Ravens. Links and diversity within the Haida Nation were gained through a cross lineal marriage system between the clans. This system was also important for the transfer of wealth within the Nation, with each clan reliant on the other for the building of longhouses, the carving of totem poles and other items of cultural importance.

Noted seafarers, the Haida occupied more than 100 villages throughout the Islands. The Haida were skilled traders, with established trade links with their neighbouring First Nations on the mainland to California. The Haida people regularly took slaves from their wars with other peoples around them.

=== Colonial era ===
The archipelago was first sighted by Europeans in 1774 by Juan Pérez, at Langara Island, in 1778 by James Cook and in 1786 by Lapérouse. In 1794, the Haida captured and sank two American maritime fur trade vessels seeking to acquire sea otter pelts, Ino, under captain Simon Metcalfe, which was captured in Houston Stewart Channel near Ninstints, and Resolution, captured near Cumshewa Inlet. In both cases only one crewmember survived. In 1851, the Haida captured the Georgiana, a ship carrying gold prospectors, and held its crew for ransom for nearly two months.

The islands played an important role during the maritime fur trade era of the late 18th and early 19th centuries. During most of that era the trade in the islands was dominated by Americans. The Oregon Treaty of 1846 put an end to American claims to the islands. Following the discovery of gold in the 1850s the British made efforts to exclude whatever American territorial claims might remain.

The Colony of the Queen Charlotte Islands was a British colony created by the Colonial Office in response to the increase in American marine trading activity resulting from the gold rush on Moresby Island in 1851. No separate administration or capital for the colony was ever established, as its only officer or appointee was James Douglas, who was simultaneously Governor of Vancouver Island. In essence, the colony was merged with the Vancouver Island colony for administrative purposes from the 1850s to 1866 when the Colony of Vancouver Island was merged with the mainland, which until that point was the separate Colony of British Columbia.

=== 21st century ===
In July 2012, entrepreneur Russ George dispersed 100 short tons (91 t) of iron sulphate dust into the Pacific Ocean several hundred miles west of the islands of Haida Gwaii. The Old Massett Village Council was persuaded to finance this geoengineering experiment as a "salmon enhancement project" with $1 million in village funds. The concept was that the formerly iron-deficient waters would produce more phytoplankton that would in turn produce more salmon. George hoped to finance the project by using the carbon sequestration effects of the new plankton as marketable carbon offsets. The project has been plagued by charges of unscientific procedures and recklessness. George contended that 100 tons of iron is negligible compared to what naturally enters the ocean.

Lawyers, environmentalists, and civil society groups are calling the dumping a "blatant violation" of two international moratoriums. George said that the Old Massett Village Council and its lawyers approved the effort and at least seven Canadian agencies were aware of it. In May 2013, the Haida Salmon Restoration Corporation removed George as a director of the company and ended his employment. The 2013 salmon runs increased from 50 million to 226 million fish, but research conducted on 13 major iron-fertilization experiments in the open ocean since 1990 concludes that the method is unproven, and with respect to the Haida Gwaii project, "scientists have seen no evidence that the experiment worked".

In a deal negotiated between the government and the Haida nation over the preceding decades, British Columbia in 2024 transferred the title over more than 200 islands off Canada's west coast to the Haida people, recognizing the nation's aboriginal land title throughout Haida Gwaii. The "Rising Tide" Haida Title Lands Agreement was the first of its kind in Canada. On 17 February 2025, Prime Minister Justin Trudeau and Haida Nation President Gaagwiis Jason Alsop signed the agreement at a public ceremony at Skidegate.

== Naming ==
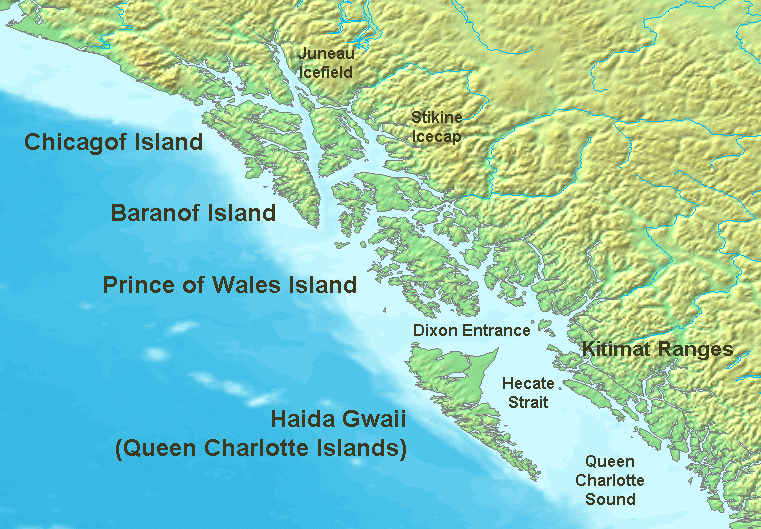
The northern Pacific Northwest Coast, showing the position of the archipelago in relation to other islands in the region. The southern half of Prince of Wales Island is Kaigani Haida territory, but is not included in the term Haida Gwaii.

In 1787 Captain George Dixon surveyed the islands. He named the islands the Queen Charlotte Islands after his ship, the Queen Charlotte, which was named after Charlotte of Mecklenburg-Strelitz, wife of King George III of the United Kingdom.

Another name, "Washington's Isles," was commonly used by American traders, who frequented the islands in the days of the marine fur trade and considered the islands part of the US-claimed Oregon Country. Following the 1846 Oregon Treaty, which established the current international borders and made the islands definitively part of the British empire, the "Queen Charlotte Islands" name became official.

On December 11, 2009, the British Columbia government announced that legislation would be introduced in mid-2010 to officially rename the Queen Charlotte Islands to the new name "Haida Gwaii". The legislation received royal assent on June 3, 2010, formalizing the name change. At an official Giving Back the Name ceremony, the name, written on a piece of paper and placed in a bentwood box, was handed to the premier of British Columbia. This name change is officially recognized by all levels of Canadian governments, and also by the United States' National Geospatial-Intelligence Agency name database. The name Haida Gwaii is a modern coinage and was created in the early 1980s as an alternative to the colonial-era name "Queen Charlotte Islands", to recognize the history of the Haida people. Haida Gwaii means "islands of the people", while Haida on its own means not only "us" but also "people".

Still in use is the older name Xaadala Gwayee or, in alternative orthography, Xhaaidlagha Gwaayaai, meaning "islands at the boundary of the world". Xhaaydla ("worlds") refers here to the sea and sky.

== Environment ==
Haida Gwaii forests
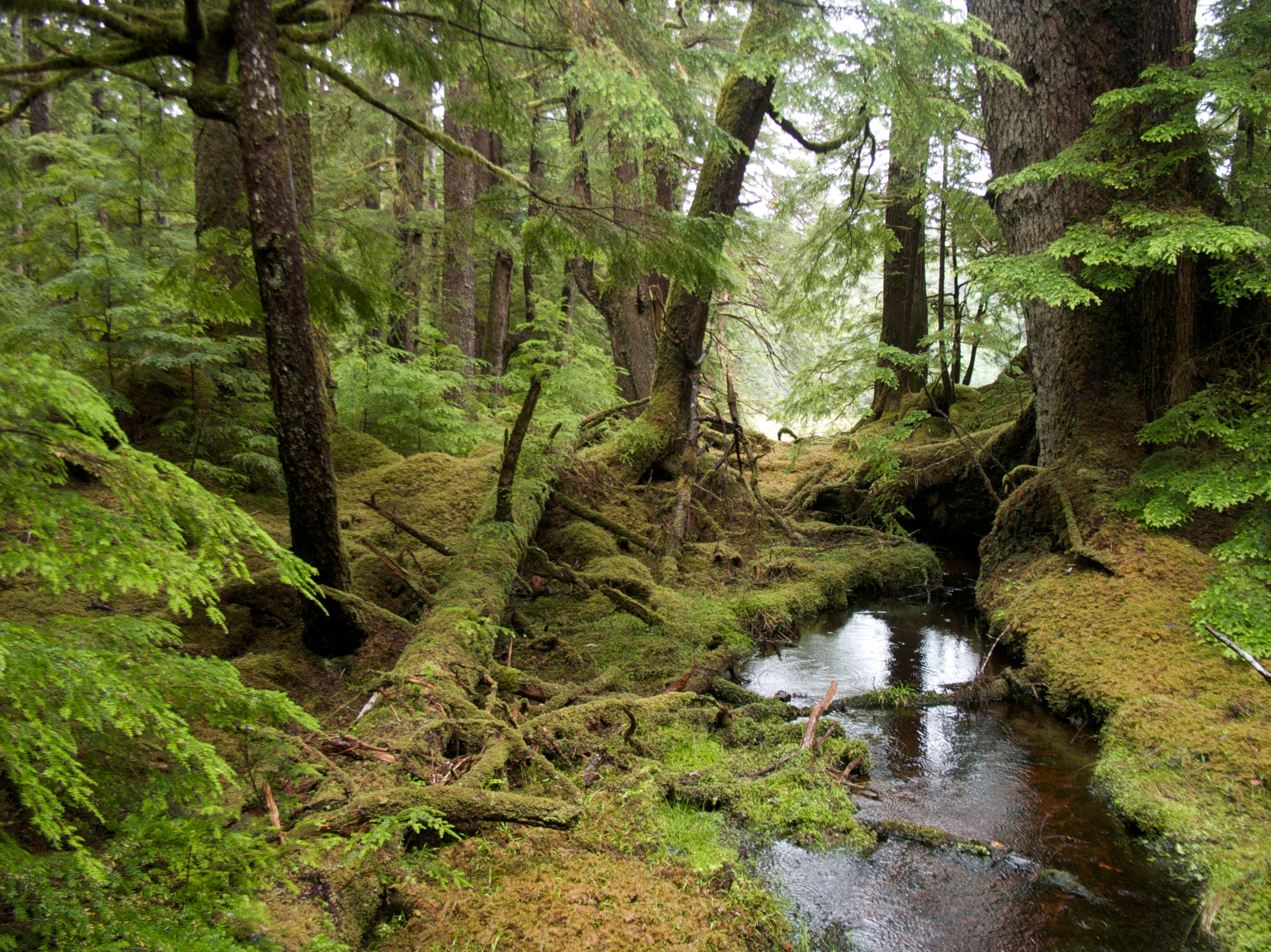
- Western hemlock forest on Moresby Island

- Haida Gwaii forests ecoregion in Canada

Ecology
- Realm: Nearctic
- Biome: Temperate coniferous forest
- Borders: British Columbia mainland coastal forests; Northern Pacific coastal forests
- Bird species: 143
- Mammal species: 3

Geography
- Area: 10,101 km^{2} (3,900 mi^{2})
- Country: Canada
- Province: British Columbia
- Climate type: Oceanic (Cfb)

Conservation
- Conservation status: Vulnerable
- Habitat loss: 0%
- Protected: 20.7%

Research by Simon Fraser University concludes that Haida Gwaii around 55,000 BCE was likely covered with tundra and low meadows that were populated by grazing mammals, including caribou and mammoths. Although no mammoth or mastodon fossils were found, the research discovered dung-eating fungi underground in ancient peat by the Cape Ball site in Naikoon Provincial Park on Graham Island. The tundra-like landscape then evolved to a mix of alpine forest and meadows.

The last Pleistocene glaciation receded from the archipelago about 16,000 BCE, about 2,000 years earlier than the rest of the British Columbia Coast's ice age. That, and its subsequent isolation from the mainland, encouraged Haida indigenous and environmental activists in the 1970s to use the term "Galápagos of the North", a unique biocultural zone with many endemic plants and animals. The climate of this temperate north hemisphere forested region, like that of much of the British Columbia and Alaskan coast in the area, is moderated by the North Pacific Current, with heavy rainfall and relatively mild temperatures throughout the year.

The islands are home to the Taan Forest, with a wide variety of large trees, including the Sitka spruce, western red cedar, yellow cedar (Nootka cypress), shore pine, western hemlock, mountain hemlock, western yew and red alder. The Flora of the Queen Charlotte Islands describes plants from the islands.

Soils are variable. Peat is common in poorly drained flats and even on sloping ground in the wetter areas. Where drainage is good, the mature soils are podzols that have classic development (well defined eluvial horizon, Ae under Canadian classification) in undisturbed areas. A history of disturbance, as from logging or windthrow, sees the Ae mixed with other horizons and only patchily visible. Kiidk'yaas (Golden Spruce), a naturally occurring genetic-variant yellow-colour Sitka spruce tree, was near the Yakoun River, the largest on Graham Island. It was a popular tourist attraction until it was illegally cut down in 1997 as a protest against the industrial logging practices.

=== Fauna ===
As an island, Haida Gwaii is home to a large number of subspecies that have evolved independently of the mainland. The Latin name of these subspecies are often appended carlottae. This includes a type of black bear (Ursus americanus carlottae), which is larger than its mainland cousin, and the smallest subspecies of ermine, the Haida ermine (Mustela haidarum haidarum). The Haida Gwaii pine marten, known in Haida as K'uuxuu, is also larger than its mainland cousin and feeds primarily on seafood. One species of bird, the Haida Gwaii Northern Saw-whet Owl, has subspecific status and may also be a species; it has darker plumage than other Saw-whets.

The island used to be home to Dawson's caribou, until their extinction from overhunting and competition from introduced black-tailed deer in the early 20th century.

Black-tailed deer, elk, beaver, muskrat, two species of squirrel, two species of rats, and raccoon are introduced species of mammals that have become abundant, imparting many ecological changes to the ecosystem.

Rabbits briefly proliferated, after the release of domesticated stock, though were quickly culled by local hunters. Milk cows (primarily shorthorn stock) were introduced to the archipelago by the Hudson’s Bay Company to bolster food supplies for coal miners. After the failure of this industry on Haida Gwaii, the cows were turned loose to roam the swamps, beaches and strawberry fields. These cows quickly reverted to a wild state, and still are a common sight on remote areas of northern Graham Island, having blended with jersey and hereford herds released from later agricultural failures. They are known to eat eelgrass.

From the spring of 1996 until November 30, 1997, a popular attraction for tourists to the islands was a male albino white raven. He lived around Port Clements and would commonly be seen taking food handouts from locals and visitors alike. He died after making contact with an electrical transformer. The white raven was preserved by former Port Clements residents, taxidermists Roger Britten Sr. and Jr., and is on display in the Port Clements Historical Society's museum.

== Climate ==
The climate is oceanic (Cfb), except near the summit of Mount Moresby where the climate is subpolar oceanic (Cfc). It is very similar to the climate of the west coast of Scotland in terms of average temperatures and total year-round precipitation, but the latitude is lower than the west coast of Scotland; it is 52° 39', the same as southern Ireland.

In the relatively shielded areas around Tlell and Sandspit annual rainfall averages from 1,200 millimetres (47 in) to 1,400 millimetres (55 in). Average monthly precipitation is markedly concentrated from October to January, with December the wettest month, averaging about 198 millimetres (7.8 in), most of which is rain, though snow is possible. May through July represent a markedly drier season; July, the driest month, averages about 46.4 millimetres (1.83 in) of rain.

Snowfall is generally moderate, averaging from 10 centimetres (4 in) to 70 centimetres (28 in), though at northerly Langara Island, it averages around 100 centimetres (40 in).

Precipitation is typically extremely frequent (especially from autumn to mid-winter), occurring on around two-thirds of all days even in relatively shielded areas, and direct sunlight is scarce, averaging around 3 to 4 hours per day.

Climate data for Sandspit Airport
| Month | Jan | Feb | Mar | Apr | May | Jun | Jul | Aug | Sep | Oct | Nov | Dec | Year |
|---|---|---|---|---|---|---|---|---|---|---|---|---|---|
| Record high humidex | 13.9 | 13.5 | 13.5 | 17.9 | 23.2 | 28.5 | 30.9 | 30.3 | 27.4 | 24.5 | 17.9 | 15.0 | 30.9 |
| Record high °C (°F) | 12.4 (54.3) | 13.4 (56.1) | 13.9 (57.0) | 18.9 (66.0) | 21.7 (71.1) | 26.7 (80.1) | 27.8 (82.0) | 26.7 (80.1) | 24.1 (75.4) | 20.6 (69.1) | 16.3 (61.3) | 13.4 (56.1) | 27.8 (82.0) |
| Mean daily maximum °C (°F) | 6.4 (43.5) | 6.7 (44.1) | 7.8 (46.0) | 9.7 (49.5) | 12.3 (54.1) | 15.0 (59.0) | 17.3 (63.1) | 18.1 (64.6) | 16.1 (61.0) | 12.2 (54.0) | 8.4 (47.1) | 6.7 (44.1) | 11.4 (52.5) |
| Daily mean °C (°F) | 4.0 (39.2) | 4.1 (39.4) | 4.9 (40.8) | 6.6 (43.9) | 9.4 (48.9) | 12.2 (54.0) | 14.5 (58.1) | 15.2 (59.4) | 13.2 (55.8) | 9.4 (48.9) | 5.7 (42.3) | 4.2 (39.6) | 8.6 (47.5) |
| Mean daily minimum °C (°F) | 1.6 (34.9) | 1.5 (34.7) | 1.9 (35.4) | 3.4 (38.1) | 6.4 (43.5) | 9.3 (48.7) | 11.6 (52.9) | 12.2 (54.0) | 10.2 (50.4) | 6.6 (43.9) | 3.0 (37.4) | 1.7 (35.1) | 5.8 (42.4) |
| Record low °C (°F) | −13.9 (7.0) | −12.3 (9.9) | −12.2 (10.0) | −5.1 (22.8) | −1.1 (30.0) | 2.2 (36.0) | 5.0 (41.0) | 1.9 (35.4) | −0.6 (30.9) | −3.1 (26.4) | −15.5 (4.1) | −12.8 (9.0) | −15.5 (4.1) |
| Record low wind chill | −22.9 | −24.1 | −22.9 | −10.8 | −3.4 | 0.0 | 0.0 | 0.0 | 0.0 | −10.7 | −26.0 | −20.8 | −26.0 |
| Average precipitation mm (inches) | 190.7 (7.51) | 130.8 (5.15) | 116.8 (4.60) | 97.7 (3.85) | 66.4 (2.61) | 51.7 (2.04) | 48.1 (1.89) | 62.2 (2.45) | 83.5 (3.29) | 169.5 (6.67) | 193.8 (7.63) | 196.2 (7.72) | 1,407.5 (55.41) |
| Average rainfall mm (inches) | 178.4 (7.02) | 120.8 (4.76) | 112.0 (4.41) | 96.6 (3.80) | 66.4 (2.61) | 51.7 (2.04) | 48.2 (1.90) | 62.3 (2.45) | 83.5 (3.29) | 169.5 (6.67) | 191.8 (7.55) | 190.0 (7.48) | 1,371.2 (53.98) |
| Average snowfall cm (inches) | 12.7 (5.0) | 9.9 (3.9) | 5.2 (2.0) | 1.0 (0.4) | 0.0 (0.0) | 0.0 (0.0) | 0.0 (0.0) | 0.0 (0.0) | 0.0 (0.0) | 0.0 (0.0) | 3.0 (1.2) | 6.0 (2.4) | 37.9 (14.9) |
| Average precipitation days (≥ 0.2 mm) | 23.3 | 19.2 | 21.5 | 19.9 | 17.7 | 15.8 | 14.9 | 14.8 | 17.3 | 22.8 | 24.0 | 23.8 | 234.9 |
| Average rainy days (≥ 0.2 mm) | 21.8 | 17.8 | 20.9 | 19.8 | 17.7 | 15.8 | 14.9 | 14.9 | 17.3 | 22.8 | 23.3 | 22.7 | 229.7 |
| Average snowy days (≥ 0.2 cm) | 3.6 | 2.8 | 2.2 | 0.9 | 0.0 | 0.0 | 0.0 | 0.0 | 0.0 | 0.0 | 1.5 | 2.0 | 13.0 |
| Average relative humidity (%) | 84.4 | 80.1 | 77.1 | 76.4 | 76.0 | 77.1 | 76.1 | 76.1 | 76.3 | 78.5 | 81.6 | 84.6 | 78.7 |
| Mean monthly sunshine hours | 41.9 | 77.2 | 115.9 | 157.7 | 194.0 | 183.8 | 195.9 | 187.7 | 137.9 | 98.0 | 58.4 | 44.8 | 1,493.1 |
| Percentage possible sunshine | 16.6 | 28.0 | 31.6 | 37.7 | 39.5 | 36.3 | 38.5 | 41.0 | 36.1 | 29.8 | 22.3 | 18.9 | 31.4 |
Source: 1981 to 2010 Canadian Climate Normals

== Geology ==
The islands are located along the Queen Charlotte Fault, an active transform fault that produces significant earthquakes every 3–30 years. This is the result of the converging of the Pacific and North American Plates along the archipelago's west coast. Major earthquakes have occurred in the Haida Gwaii in 1949 and 2012. Though the region is prone to fair geological activity, there is little infrastructure set up to gather accurate information to warn locals of possible threats. Many residents, notably from First Nations communities, have been critical of the fact that they must rely on information coming from neighbouring American states, such as Washington or Alaska, and from the USGS (United States Geological Survey). Regardless of the inconsistencies, Environment Canada does regularly do field tests across the Pacific coast of British Columbia relating to this matter.

The Cascadia subduction zone does pose some additional earthquake risks, but, most importantly, the subduction zone poses direct tsunami risks to the coastal settlements on the western side of the islands.

== Culture ==
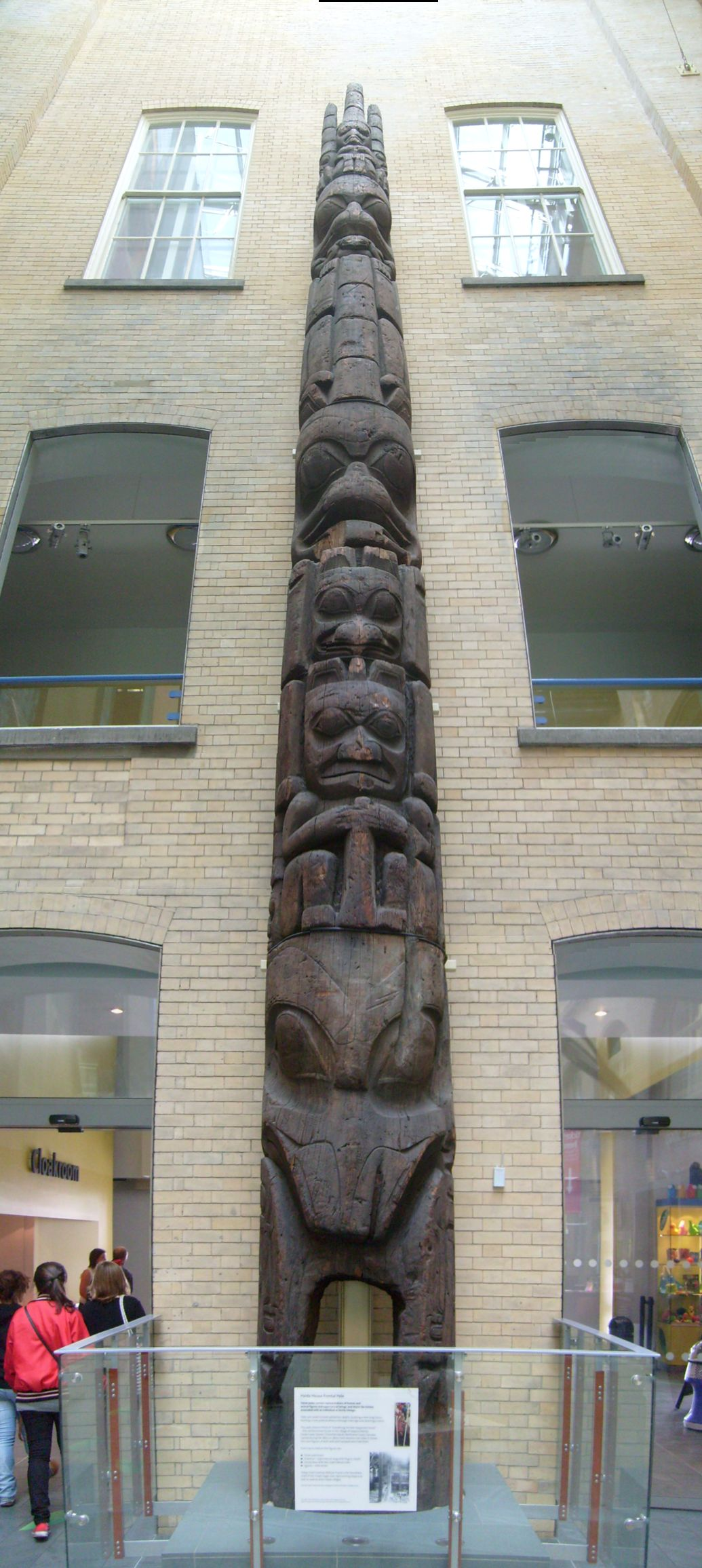
Totem pole

=== Visual arts ===
The artwork known as Spirit of Haida Gwaii, by Bill Reid, is featured on the reverse of Canadian $20 bills produced between 2004 and 2011. It depicts a Haida chief in a canoe, accompanied by the mythic messengers Raven, Frog and Eagle (the first casting of this sculpture, Spirit of Haida Gwaii: The Black Canoe, is on display in the atrium of the Canadian Embassy in Washington DC, the other, Spirit of Haida Gwaii: the Jade Canoe, is on display in Vancouver Airport). Haida art is also frequently seen on large monumental-sized cedar totem poles and dugout canoes, hand-crafted gold and silver jewellery, and even as cartoons in the form of Haida manga.

=== Repatriation of cultural belongings ===
The Haida have been engaged in an ongoing repatriation effort, bringing belongings/remains back to their ancestral homelands since the 1990s. Much of this battle is influenced by the number of remains taken from the island, due to Haida remains being popular among collectors in the late 19th century.

Repatriation to the Haida is more than a return of belongings/ remains, but a shared healing and grieving process that integrates aspects of Haida culture, ceremony, language, and song. Repatriation refers to the return of ancestors' spirits to their homelands to rest. In Haida practices, the ancestors must be cared for, so much effort goes into preparing and following protocols to bring them home. Though there are no traditional protocols for repatriation, as this was not historically necessary, much work was done with elders and community members to determine culturally appropriate ways to bring home remains and belongings. The community decided it would be important to include the making and preparation of traditional bentwood boxes, woven cedar, and button blankets to wrap the ancestors. Alongside this ceremony was held at both the Museum, where remains were collected, and in the Haida's home territory to lay the ancestors to rest.

A noteworthy repatriation happened in the early 2000s, when the Haida Repatriation Committee supported the repatriation of about 150 remains and other belongings from the Field Museum in Chicago. This was an important event in the Haida Nation and has left its mark on their cultural resurgence and community healing. During the ceremony for this specific repatriation, the community also recognized many of the babies born this year, highlighting the return of ancestors and the continued generations and resiliency of the Haida.

The Buxton Museum and Art Gallery in England repatriated items in its collection to the Haida people. The Museum returned the items as part of its initiative to return Native American and First Nation artefacts.

=== Haida language ===
The Haida language was proposed for classification as part of the Na-Dene family of languages on the basis of a few similarities with Athabaskan–Eyak–Tlingit. Many linguists, however, consider the evidence insufficient and continue to regard Haida as a language isolate. All 50 remaining speakers of Haida are over 70 years old. Telus Communications and Gwaii Trust recently completed a project to bring broadband internet to the island via a 150 km (93 mi) microwave relay. This enables interactive research to be carried out on the more than 80 CDs of language, story and spoken history of the people.

== See also ==
- Council of the Haida Nation
- Dené–Yeniseian languages
- Guujaaw
- Haida Gwaii: On the Edge of the World
- Haida language
- Hlk'yah G̱awG̱a (Windy Bay)
- Indigenous peoples of Siberia
- Lohafex
- Lyell Island
- Moresby Camp
- List of islands of British Columbia
- The Stand (2024 film)

== Bibliography ==
- Trigger, Bruce G.; Washburn, Wilcomb E.; Adams, Richard E. W.; MacLeod, Murdo J.; Salomon, Frank; Schwartz, Stuart B. (1996). The Cambridge History of the Native Peoples of the Americas: North America. Cambridge University Press. ISBN 9780521573931. - Total pages: 500
- Kennedy, Dorothy; Bouchard, Randy; Gessler, Trisha (2010). "Haida". The Canadian Encyclopedia.
