= Gwaii Haanas National Park Reserve and Haida Heritage Site =

National park reserve and heritage site in British Columbia, Canada

- Réserve de parc national, réserve d'aire marine nationale de conservation et site du patrimoine haïda Gwaii Haanas
- IUCN category II (national park)
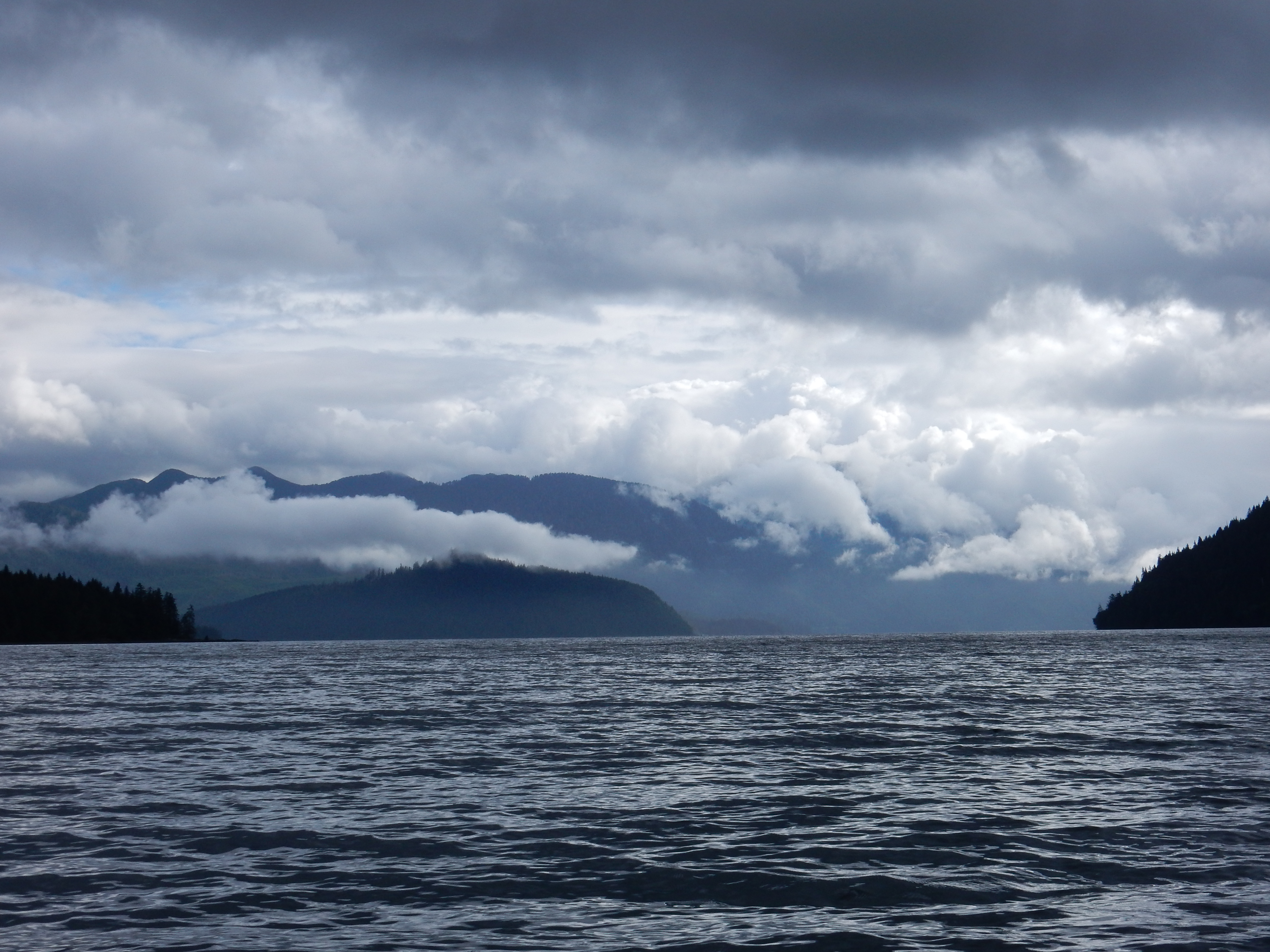

- Location within British Columbia Location within Canada
- Interactive map of Gwaii Haanas National Park Reserve and Haida Heritage Site
- Location: Haida Gwaii, British Columbia, Canada
- Nearest city: Sandspit
- Coordinates: 52°23′21″N 131°28′16″W
- Area: 1,470 km^{2} (570 sq mi)
- Established: 1988
- Governing body: Gwaii Haanas Archipelago Management Board
- Website: parks.canada.ca/pn-np/bc/gwaiihaanas

Gwaii Haanas National Park Reserve, National Marine Conservation Area, and Haida Heritage Site, usually referred to simply as Gwaii Haanas (/ˌɡwaɪ ˈhɑːnəs/), is located in southernmost Haida Gwaii (formerly known as Queen Charlotte Islands), 130 kilometres (81 miles) off the mainland of British Columbia, Canada. Gwaii Haanas protects an archipelago of 138 islands, the largest being Moresby Island and the southernmost being Kunghit Island. "Gwaii Haanas" means "Islands of Beauty" in X̱aayda kíl, a southern dialect of the Haida language.

The Haida Heritage Site is regarded as being within the modern concept of a territory of the Haida people, who claim to descend from ancestors that lived in the islands now known as Haida Gwaii across the last 8,000 to 14,000 years. Ḵ'aygang.nga (the Haida canon of oral histories) say Haida lived in Gwaii Haanas when the first trees arrived at Xaagyah Gwaay.yaay (Bolkus Islands) as glaciers retreated. Pollen samples indicate trees first arrived 14,500 years ago.

Numerous films have covered Gwaii Haanas, including the 2011 short National Parks Project, directed by Scott Smith and scored by Sarah Harmer, Jim Guthrie and Bry Webb.

== History ==
=== Establishing Gwaii Haanas ===
From the 1970s through the early 1980s, plans to expand logging to Burnaby Island led to controversy, and the first concerted efforts to protect Gwaii Haanas. The "South Moresby Wilderness Proposal" was drawn up in an effort to stem natural resource exploitation.

To prevent logging, the Haida Nation designated the "Haida Heritage Site" in 1985, encompassing roughly the southern third of the archipelago. Importantly, the Heritage site included a swath of land and sea, both terrestrial and marine areas. However, logging continued, amidst legal and political battles. In 1987, logging ended when the governments of Canada and British Columbia signed the South Moresby Memorandum of Understanding.

This accord led to the South Moresby Agreement a year later, which created South Moresby National Park Reserve. It was not a full national park; it was an area reserved to become a national park, because there were outstanding claims to land ownership among federal and tribal governments. But the measure safeguarded the area, and permitted shared stewardship. It would be managed as if it were a national park, pending land claims.

=== Cooperative management ===
In 1993, the Government of Canada and the Council of the Haida Nation signed the Gwaii Haanas Agreement, which changed the name of the national park reserve to a native name. This Agreement expresses respect for both Canadian and Haida designations and interests, and includes a mutual commitment to the protection of Gwaii Haanas. Because the park reserve and the Haida Heritage Site nearly coincide (on land), its official name reflected both designations: Gwaii Haanas National Park Reserve and Haida Heritage Site.

Based on the Agreement, Gwaii Haanas is cooperatively managed by the Archipelago Management Board (AMB), which is made up of an equal number of representatives from the Council of Haida Nation and the Government of Canada. The AMB is responsible for all aspects of planning, operation, and management of Gwaii Haanas.

== Gwaii Haanas National Marine Conservation Area Reserve ==
For the Haida, the marine and terrestrial environments are inseparable. The boundary between earth and ocean exists only on a map. Such is not the case with the park reserve. While the heritage site includes both land and sea, the national park reserve overlaps with only the terrestrial portion of the site. The Gwaii Haanas Agreement provided for native–federal negotiations on managing the marine portion of the site, which eventually bore fruit in 2010 when an enveloping protected area was created. Like the national park reserve it surrounds, the marine reserve is reserved for future designation to full park system status, pending sea claim settlements.

Meantime, the Gwaii Haanas NMCAR will balance protecting marine ecosystems, while also allowing ecolgocially sustainable use. This includes traditional harvesting, recreational and commercial fishing.

The appearance of "Haida Heritage Site" in both the names of the national park reserve and the marine reserve is a duplication of name, but not of reference. As part of the national park reserve name, it refers to the terrestrial portion of the site. As part of the marine reserve name, it refers to the marine portion of the site. Still, there are areas of the heritage site—both land and sea—which are outside both federal reserves. These are all in the northernmost parts of the site.

Gwaii Haanas National Marine Conservation Area Reserve, which covers 3,400 square kilometres, is "a primary feeding habitat" of the humpback whale (North Pacific population) protected by Canada's Species at Risk Act (SARA).

With the NMCAR established, nearly 5,000 square kilometres of Gwaii Haanas are protected. This is one of the only places in the world where a representative area is protected from mountain top to ocean depth.

=== Gwaii Haanas Crest ===

The AMB's crest, crafted by local Haida artist Giitsxaa, was created to represent the unique joint management relationship. The AMB chose the sea otter and the sea urchin because of the creatures' significance in the history and tradition of the protected area, and because of their ecological significance.

Populations of sea urchin, a kelp-grazing species, were once kept in check by sea otters, ensuring an abundance of kelp and species that depend upon kelp communities. With the extirpation of sea otters during the Maritime Fur Trade, the natural balance between species in the community was disturbed. As a result, the sea urchin population has increased dramatically over time and the health of kelp forests is threatened. The loss of the sea otter is a powerful reminder of the vulnerability of individual species and entire ecosystems.

== World Heritage and National Historic Site Haida Village ==
SG̱ang Gwaay Llnaagay
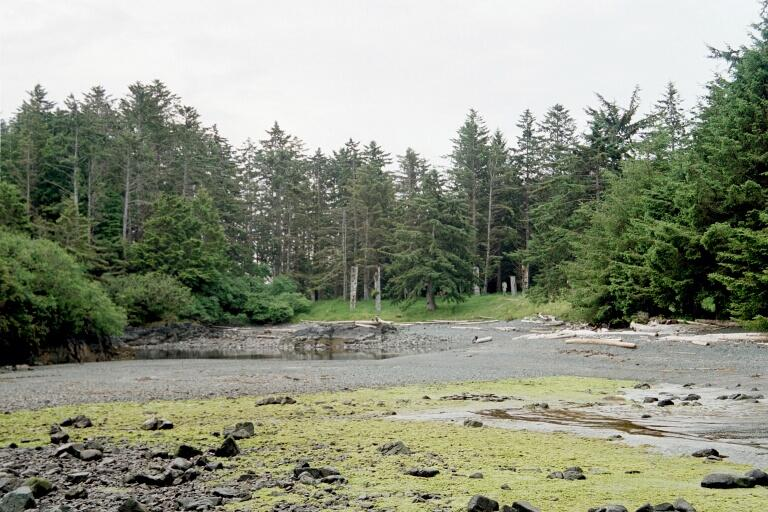
- A former Haida village at the site
- Interactive map of SG̱ang Gwaay Llnaagay

UNESCO World Heritage Site
- Type: Cultural
- Criteria: iii
- Designated: 1981 (5th session)
- Reference no.: 157
- Region: Europe and North America

National Historic Site of Canada
- Official name: Nan Sdins National Historic Site of Canada
- Designated: 1981

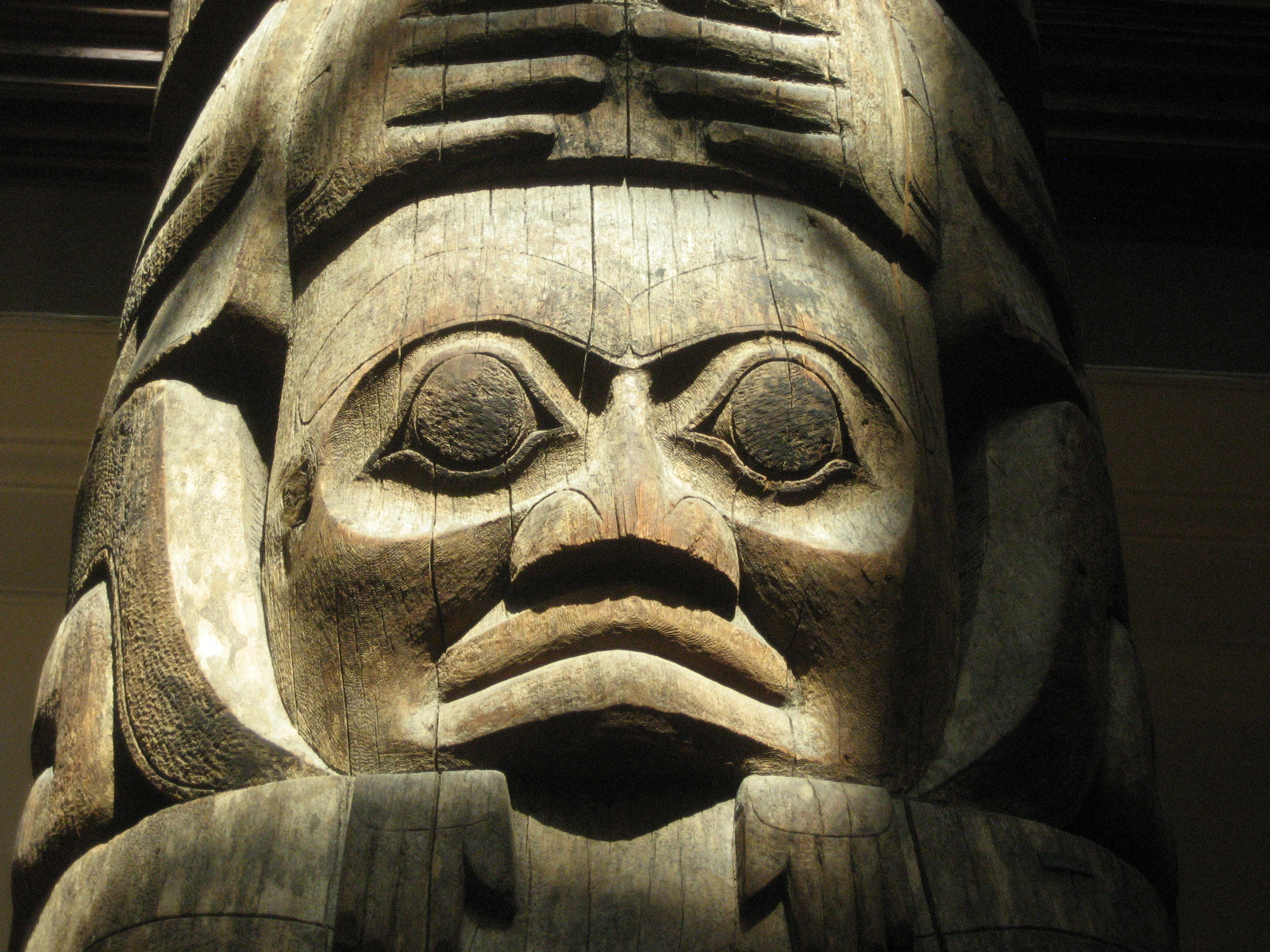
Detail of Haida totem pole from Tanu, Haida Gwaii (Museum of Archaeology and Anthropology, University of Cambridge)

Ninstints (Nan Sdins) or SG̱ang Gwaay Llnaagay on Anthony Island, located in the southernmost part of Gwaii Haanas, just west of Kunghit Island, was declared a UNESCO World Heritage Site and a National Historic site of Canada in 1981. The remains of a Haida village on the eastern side of the island — SG̱ang Gwaay Llnaagay — represent an outstanding example of a traditional Northwest Coast First Nations village site, complete with standing totem poles and the remains of cedar longhouses.

Haida people have a continuing presence at SG̱ang Gwaay and four other village sites between May and September as part of the Haida Gwaii Watchmen Program. Between two and four Watchmen live at each site serving as guardians to protect the natural and cultural heritage of these sites.

Other historical villages within the boundaries of Gwaii Haanas included Cumshewa, Clew (Tanu) and Djí-gua.

=== Potential expansion ===
In 2004, Parks Canada, on behalf of the Government of Canada, added the entirety of Gwaii Haanas to its tentative list of potential future World Heritage Sites, pending approval by UNESCO.

== Ecology ==
=== Terrain and climate ===
The landscapes of Gwaii Haanas vary from deep fjords to rugged mountains, salmon spawning streams to sub-alpine tundra. Close to 90% of Gwaii Haanas is forested, with 9% alpine and sub-alpine tundra. The remaining 1% is made up of lakes and wetlands.

As water drains from the highest mountains - including the rugged San Christoval Range with peaks over 1,100 metres (3,609 feet) - it helps fill over 40 freshwater lakes. In turn, this water drains through more than 100 salmon spawning streams. The reserve also includes Hotspring Island, also called G̱andll K'in Gwaayaay in the Haida language, an island with a hot spring.

A small off-the-grid community, located in Rose Harbour, Kunghit Island, is on the only private piece of land in the Southern Gwaii Haanas area. The community's economy is mostly based on small-scale ecotourism, where it is possible to find accommodation, meals, guides and sea kayaking. The Rose Harbour property was an important whaling station off the North Coast of British Columbia until the 1940s.

=== Flora ===
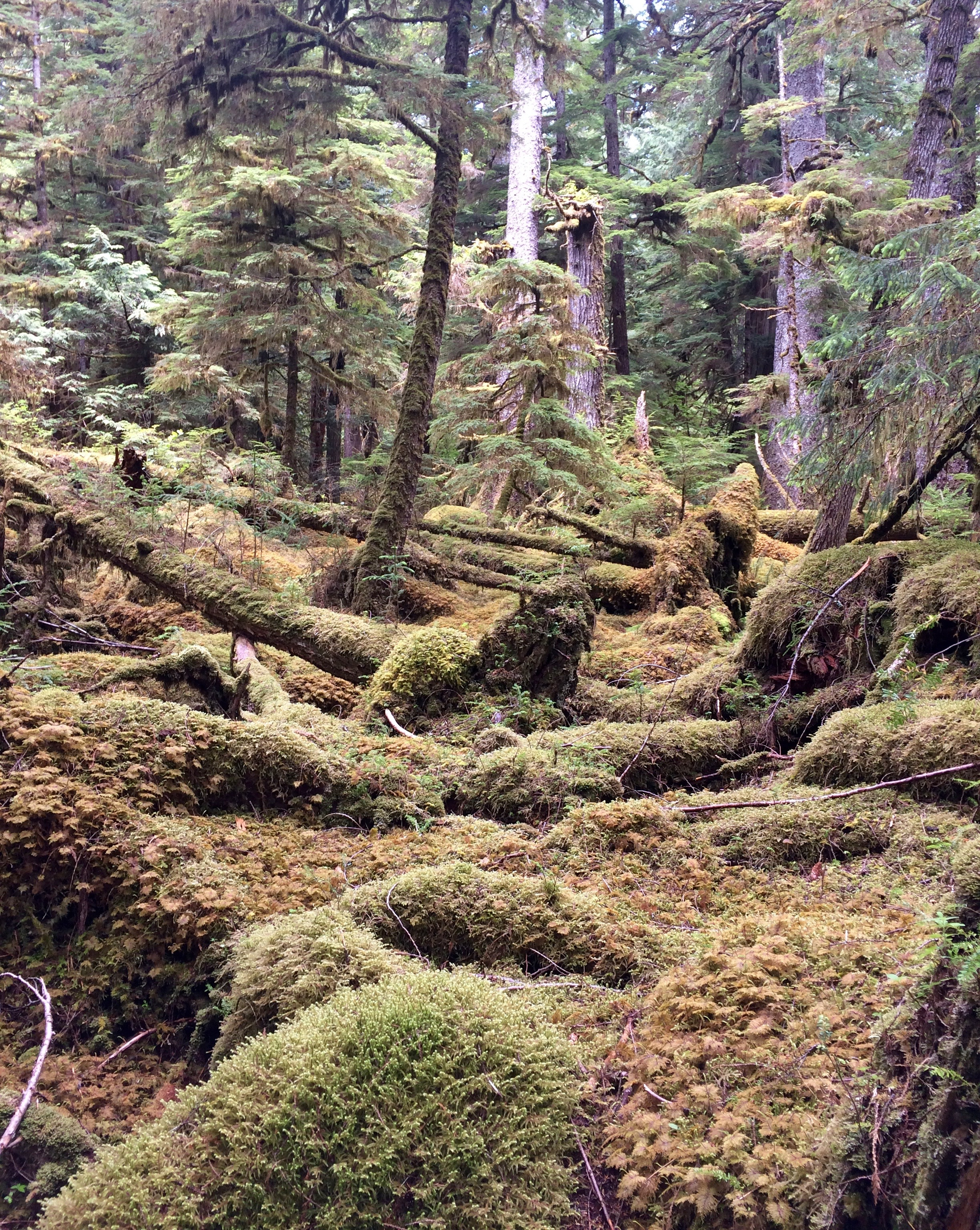
Moss covering forest floor

The west coast of Gwaii Haanas can receive over 4,000 millimetres (157.5 inches) of rain annually. Extreme exposure to wind and rain makes the forests on the west coast boggy and stunted, and tree species are dominated by western red cedar and hemlock. Forests of the leeward (eastern) side of Gwaii Haanas are classic coastal temperate rainforest. Dominant overstory species include large western hemlock, Sitka spruce and western red cedar trees.

=== Fauna ===
Distinct island flora and fauna have evolved over thousands of years. Species here often differ from those found on the mainland. Many common continental species are not found on the islands, or have evolved into unique subspecies such as the Haida Gwaii black bear which is larger than its mainland cousin. Other species have been introduced relatively recently, such as the Sitka deer, ermine, raccoon, squirrel and beaver. Introduced species now exist in large numbers, much to the detriment of native plants and animals.

An estimated 750,000 seabirds nest along the shoreline of Gwaii Haanas from May through August. Many are burrow-nesters, such as the rhinoceros auklet, ancient murrelet and tufted puffin. Bald eagles are a common sight and nest in trees along the coastline. Because the islands are situated along the Pacific Flyway, dozens of species of migrating birds stop here in spring and fall.

== Access ==
Gwaii Haanas has been recognized for its pristine environment and sustainable management practices. It is a very remote location, accessible by sea kayak, boat, or chartered floatplane only. An orientation is mandatory for all visitors before entry.

== Gallery ==
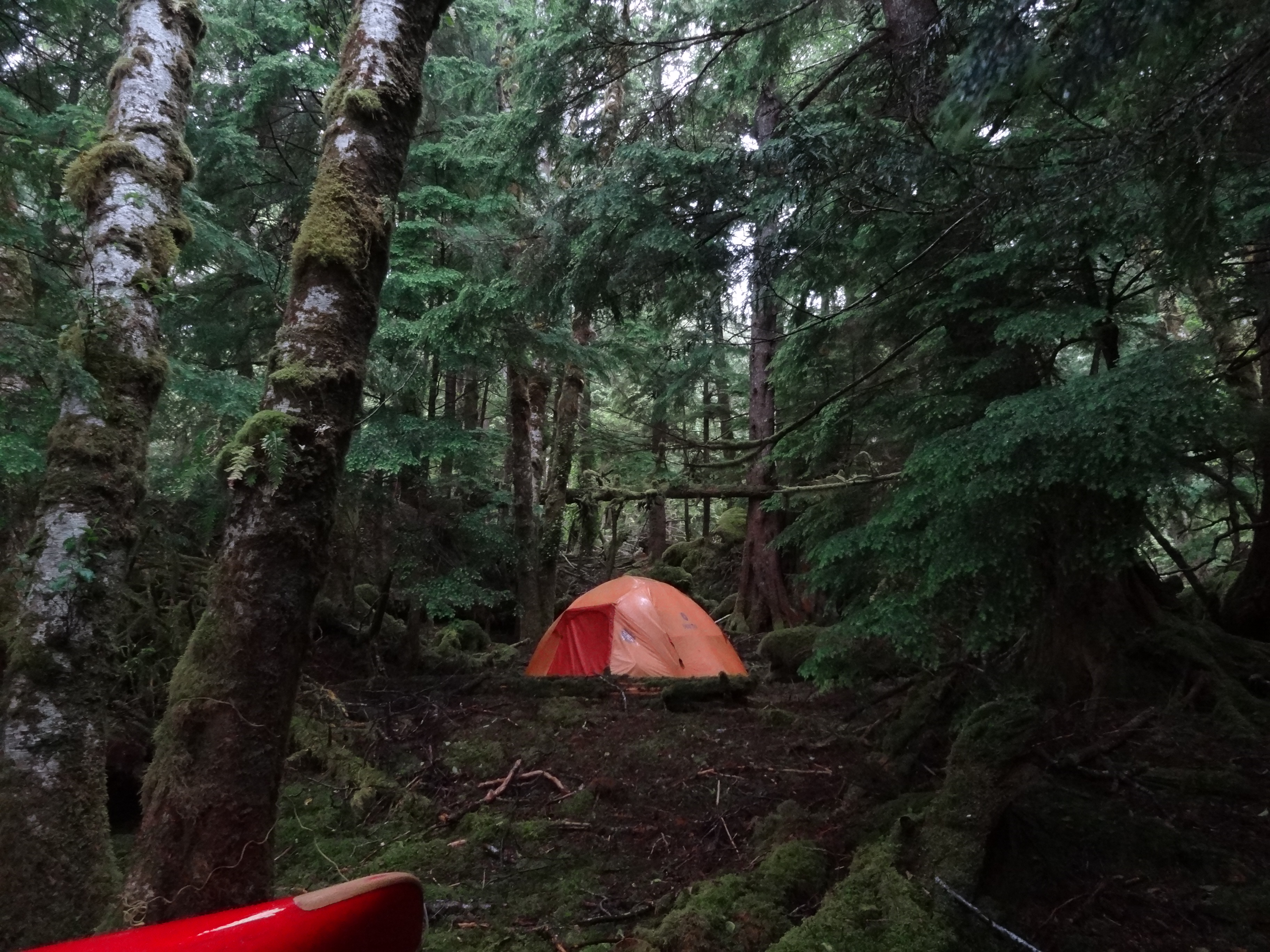
A tent in the forest

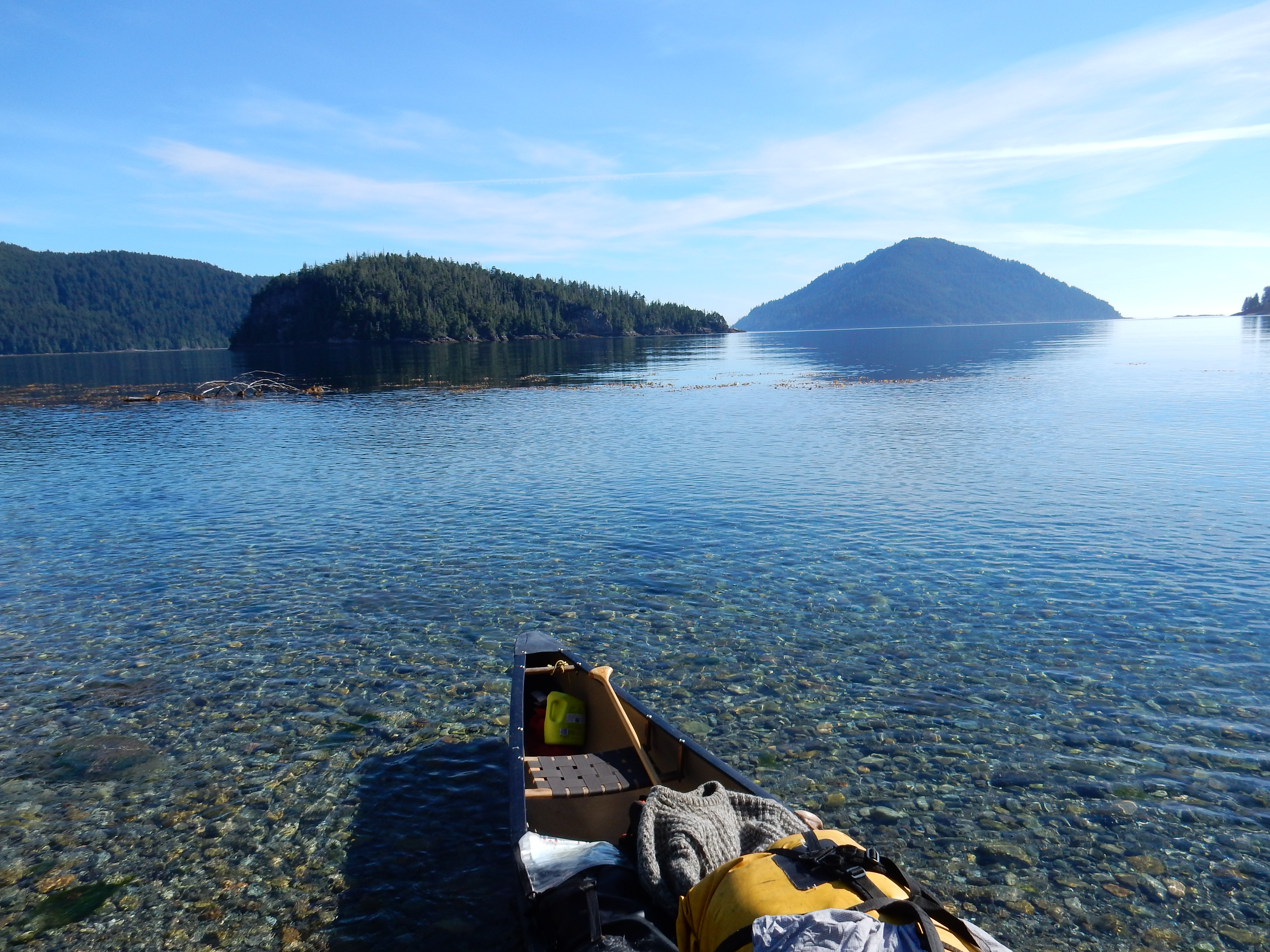
A loaded canoe

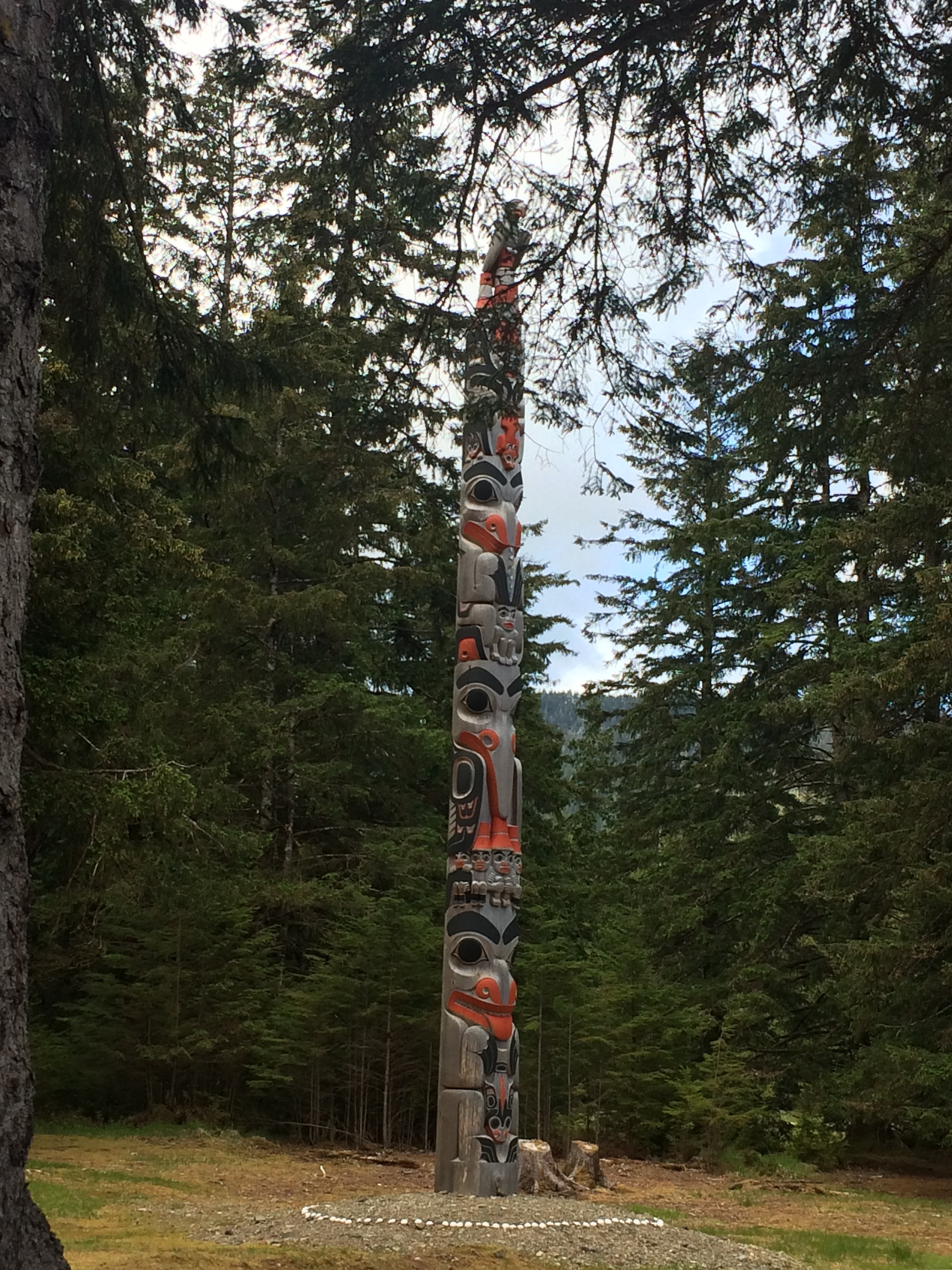
Totem pole

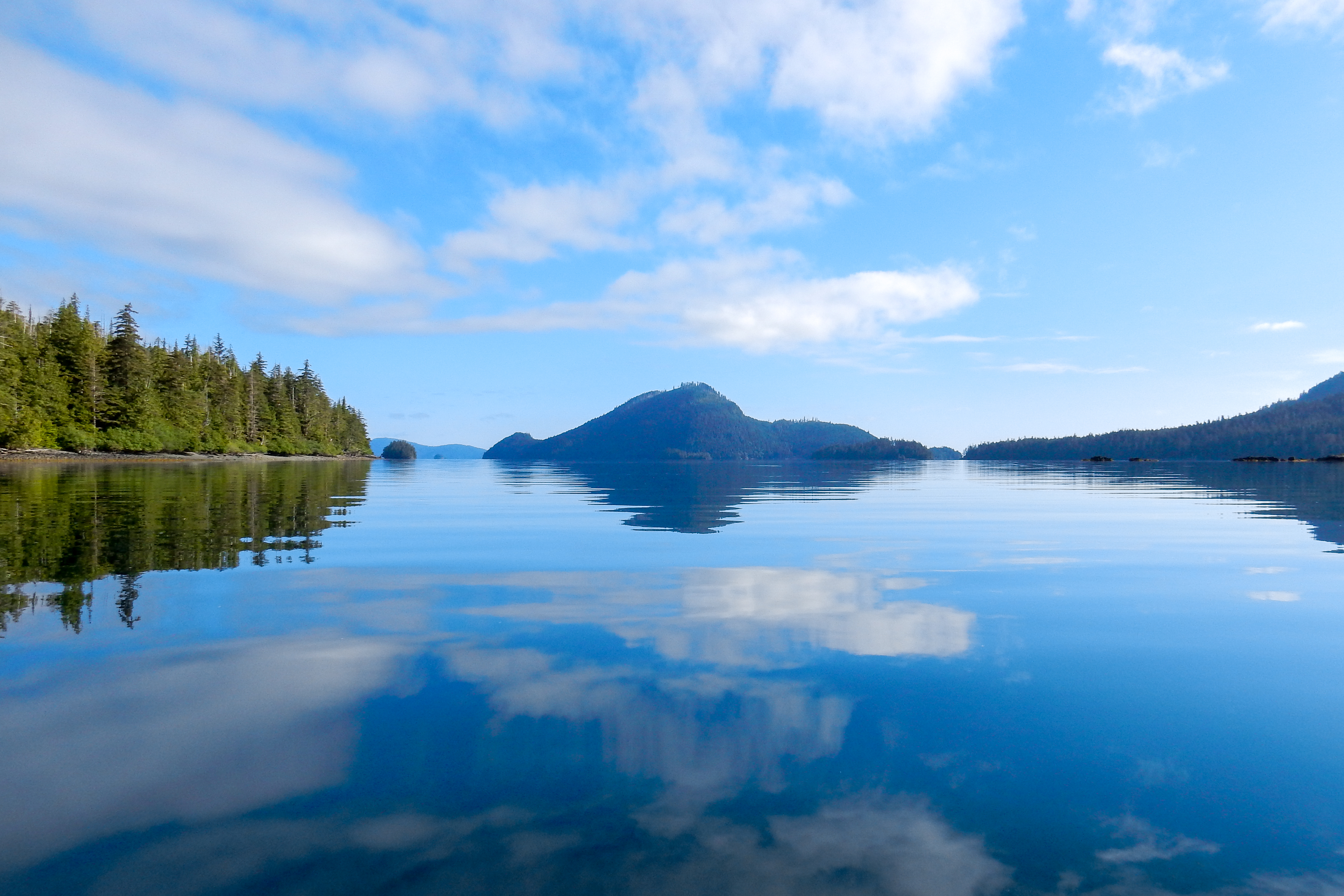
A view from the water

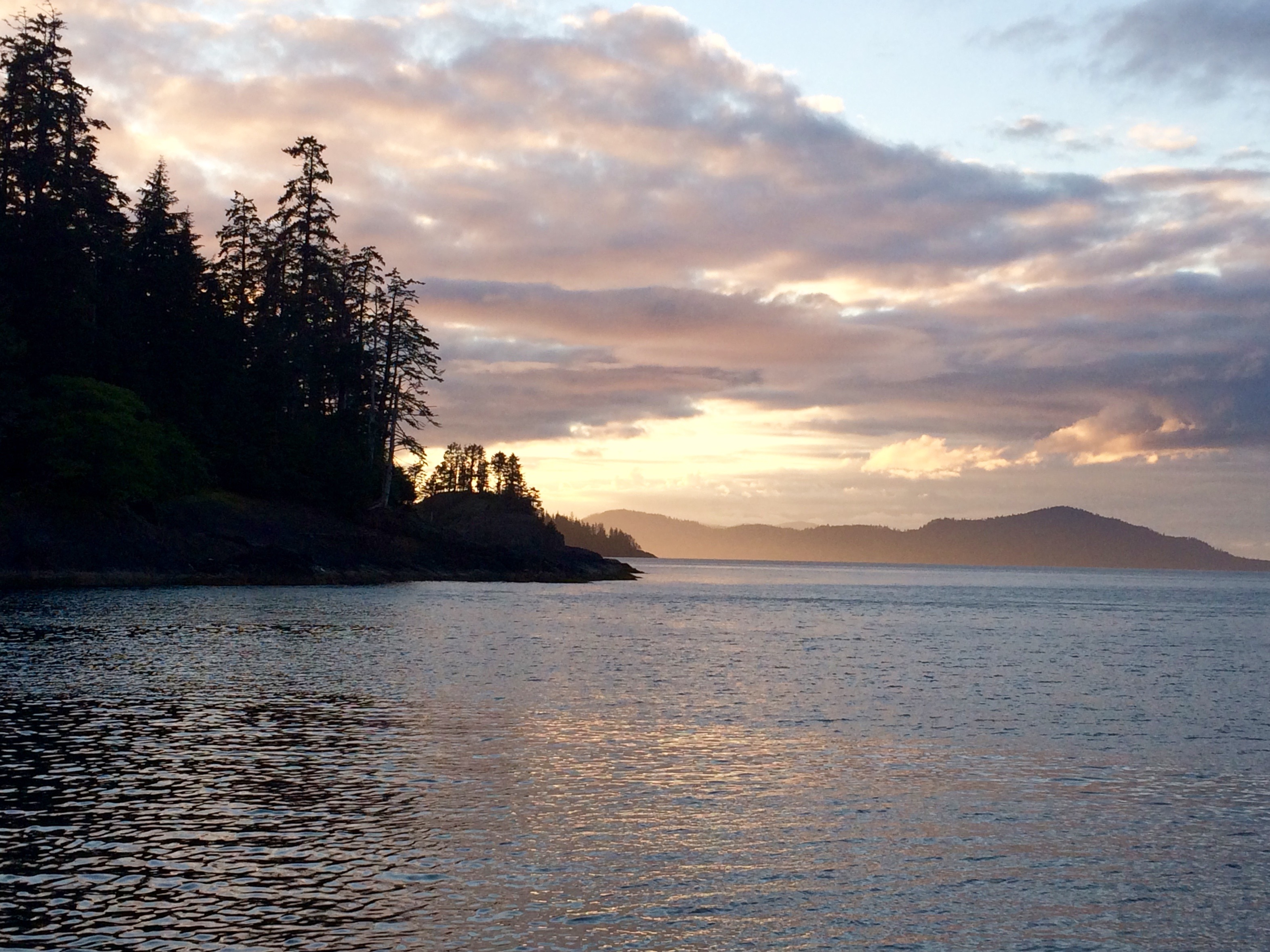
Sunset coastal view

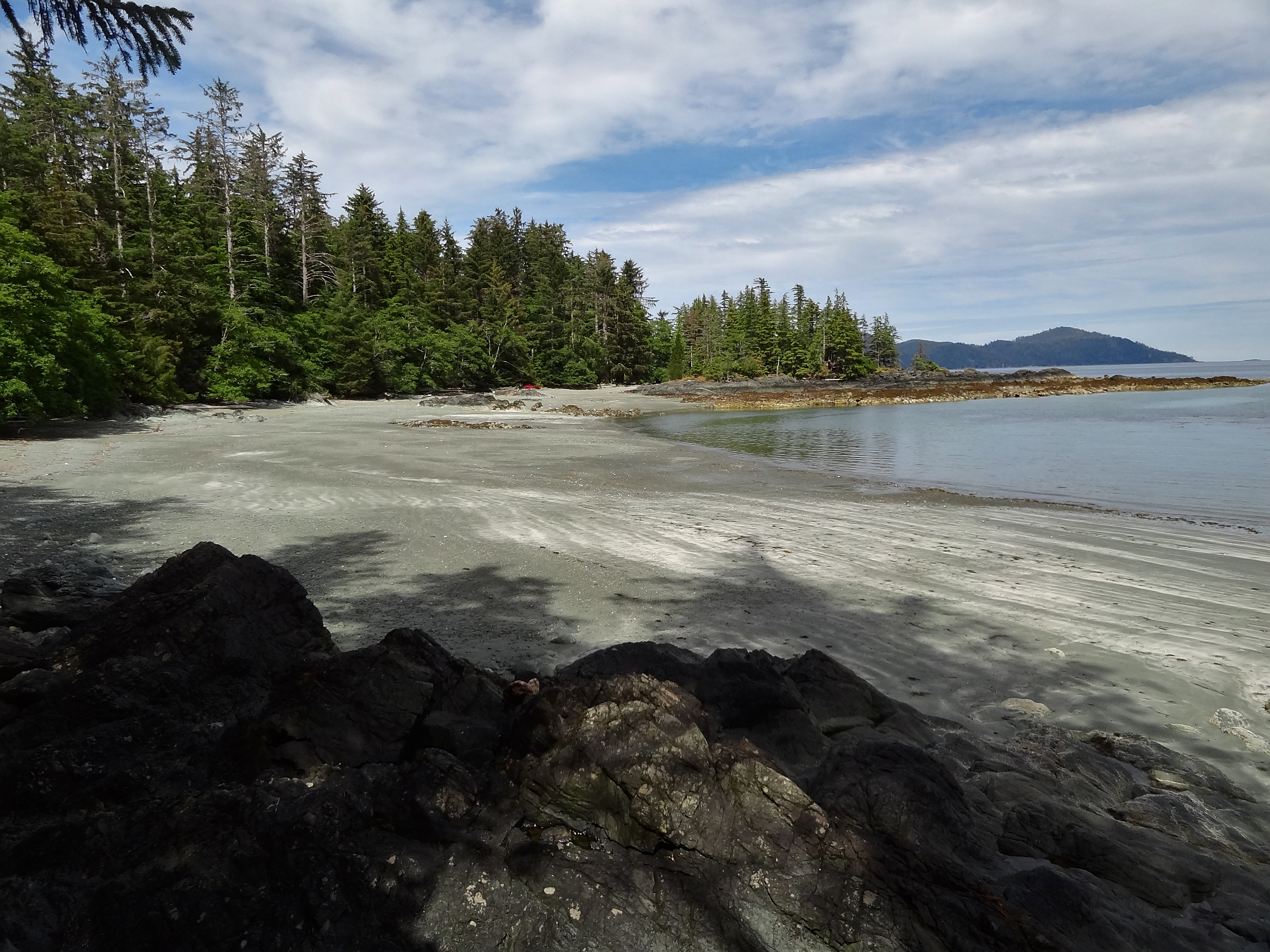
Sandy beach

== See also ==
- List of National Parks of Canada
- National Parks of Canada

== Affiliations ==
The museum is affiliated with: CMA, CHIN, and Virtual Museum of Canada.
