= List of accidents and incidents involving the Douglas DC-4 =

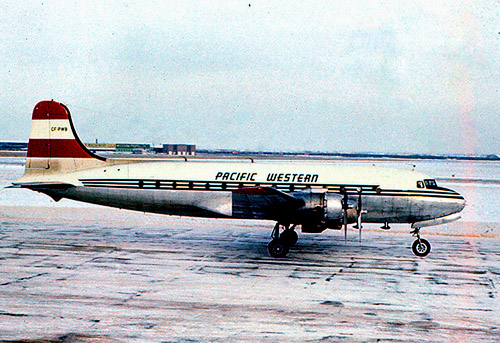
Douglas DC-4 of Pacific Western Airlines in 1959

The Douglas DC-4 is a piston-engine airliner and transport aircraft built by the Douglas Aircraft Company from 1942 to 1947. The type was originally designed as a commercial airliner, but until the end of World War II, all were built as military transports. After the war, many of these military aircraft were converted into commercial transports. Including military versions, more than 1200 DC-4s were built; a few are still flying today.

The DC-4 was known as the C-54 Skymaster in United States Army and Air Force service. In United States Navy service prior to 1962 it was known as the R5D; that year all U.S. Navy variants were also designated as the C-54.

== Notable civil accidents and incidents ==
=== 1940s ===
15 January 1943
US Army Air Force C-54 41-32939 crashed 25 mi ENE of Paramaribo, Suriname en route to North Africa from the United States after an unexplained midair breakup, killing all 35 on board, including Eric Knight, author of the novel Lassie Come-Home. The aircraft was operated by TWA on behalf of the USAAF's Air Transport Command. Two other C-54s flying before and after the crashed C-54 noticed anti-aircraft fire from what looked like an enemy submarine.

9 July 1943
US Army Air Force C-54 41-37271 was performing a flight over Wright Patterson Air Base when USAAF Lockheed C-40A 38-546 struck the wing of the C-54; the C-40 entered a spin and crashed near the runway; the C-54 stayed airborne for 500–750 feet before it also crashed, allowing two passengers (of five people on board) to bail out of the C-54; five on board the C-40 died.

26 January 1944
US Army Air Force C-54A 41-37292 crashed on takeoff from Accra Airport, killing at least 23.

25 March 1944
US Army Air Force C-54A 41-37274 was mistaken for an enemy aircraft and shot down by a Royal Navy Grumman F4F fighter pilot; it crashed in the Atlantic Ocean off the Azores, killing all six on board. The C-54 overflew an Allied convoy at 5,000 ft (1,500 m) and was misidentified as a German Focke-Wulf Fw 200.

20 June 1944
TWA Flight 277, a C-54A, struck the side of Fort Mountain after the pilot became disoriented in bad weather, killing all seven on board. The aircraft was operated by TWA on behalf of the USAAF's Air Transport Command.

26 July 1944
US Army Air Force C-54A 42-107470 disappeared in the Atlantic Ocean off Greenland with 26 on board; the aircraft was never found.

28 August 1944
US Army Air Force C-54A 42-72171 crashed in a residential area near Prestwick Airport while attempting to land, killing all 20 on board and five on the ground. The aircraft was too low during final approach.

4 September 1944
US Navy R5D-2 90385 ditched in San Francisco Bay, killing one of five on board.

7 September 1944
US Army Air Force C-54A 42-72211 crashed near Presque Isle Army Air Base while on a training flight due to a possible maintenance error, killing the three crew.

9 November 1944
US Army Air Force C-54A 42-107438 crashed in Marathon Bay shortly after takeoff from Florida Keys Airport, killing the four crew.

11 November 1944
US Army Air Force C-54A 42-72252 crashed 50 mi off Oahu, killing all 17 on board.

12 November 1944
US Army Air Force C-54A 42-107427 struck a mountain near Cape St. George, Canada, killing nine of 18 on board.

17 March 1945
US Army Air Force C-54B 42-72418 crashed somewhere in the China Burma India Theater, killing at least four crew. The wreckage was never found.

19 March 1945
US Army Air Force C-54A 42-72264 crashed 4 mi off Rock Harbor, Florida while on a training flight, killing the five crew; the wreckage was found the next day in 19 feet of water.

1 April 1945
US Army Air Force C-54A 42-72244 was written off at an unknown location.
22 April 1944
US Army Air Force C-54A-DO 41-37304 flipped at landing in RAF Masirah, killing 37 out of the 40.
5 May 1945
US Army Air Force C-54E 44-9043 crashed in mountainous terrain on Manus Island due to possible pilot error, killing all 21 on board.

24 May 1945
US Army Air Force C-54B 42-72385 was destroyed on the ground at Yontan Airfield during a Japanese attack.

18 June 1945
US Army Force C-54B 42-72372 was being ferried from Casablanca to Karachi when it crashed 75 mi (121 km) southeast of Biskra due to severe turbulence, killing the four crew.

3 July 1945
US Army Air Force C-54D 42-72680 struck a hillside near Vila do Porto, Azores and broke up, killing the four crew.

4 July 1945
US Army Air Force C-54B 42-72310 disappeared near Kunming, China.

20 July 1945
US Army Air Force C-54E 44-9026 crashed near New Castle Army Air Base while performing an instrument approach, killing the four crew; the cause was never determined.

11 September 1945
US Army Air Force C-54G 45-526 crashed near Linan, China, killing at least four.

30 September 1945
US Navy R5D-1 39180 struck the top of Mount Tenjo, Guam and crashed in a gorge, killing seven.

3 November 1945
US Army Air Force C-54G 45-528 operating Flight USAF28A struck a mountain near Chukha, Bhutan due to pilot error, killing all 44 on board. The accident remains the deadliest in Bhutan.

25 May 1946
US Army Air Force C-54G 45-489 disappeared over the Pacific some 480 km (298 mi) east of Guam during a flight from Kwajalein to Guam with five on board. A Boeing B-17G (44-83783) was sent to find the missing C-54, but it also disappeared.

29 May 1946
A United Air Lines C-54A (NC30065) crashed near Chicago due to excessive descent during a training flight; all four crew survived, but the aircraft was written off.

1 June 1946
US Army Air Force C-54E 44-9078 crashed off Amalfi, Italy due to a cockpit fire and loss of control, killing 30 of 38 on board. The cause of the fire was not determined, but a short circuit was blamed.

9 June 1946
US Army Air Force C-54D 43-17231 crashed on Taboga Island, Panama due to a navigation error, killing all 23 on board. The pilot had mistaken Otoque Island for Taboga Island and began descending. When the pilot radioed ATC that he was 5 miles south of Albrook Field and on approach, he thought the aircraft was past Taboga when in fact it was over Taboga.

11 July 1946
Pacific Overseas Airlines-operated Air Transport Command Douglas C-54 43-17229 was 15 minutes outbound from Harmon Field on Guam enroute to Atsugi Airfield in Japan when the propeller from one engine detached, taking out a propeller in another engine. The aircraft landed on the ocean about 24 miles from Harmon. The crew of seven was rescued.

18 September 1946
A Sabena DC-4-1009 (OO-CBG) crashed on approach to Gander, Newfoundland on a flight from Brussels to New York City via Shannon and Gander. Twenty-seven were killed out of 44 aboard. The crash and the subsequent search and rescue operation are documented in the book "Charlie Baker George" by Frank F. Tibbo.

3 October 1946
An American Overseas Airlines C-54E (N90904, named Flagship New England) crashed into a hill after taking off in darkness from Stephenville-Harmon Field in Newfoundland on a flight to Shannon, Ireland. The 31 passengers and eight crew aboard were killed.

8 October 1946
United Air Lines Flight 28, a DC-4 (NC30051, named Mainliner Lake Michigan) crashed near Cheyenne, Wyoming after a loss of altitude while making a turn to land, killing two of 41 on board.

11 January 1947
A Far East Air Transport C-54A (PI-C100) ditched in the Pacific 81 mi off Laoag, Philippines due to an engine fire, killing seven of 42 on board.

20 January 1947
A US Navy R5D struck an embankment and crashed on landing at Oakland NAS in fog during a radar-guided approach, killing one of 21 on board. The aircraft was too low during the approach. The accident was the first after 76000 safe landings using GCA guidance.

6 February 1947
An Aerovias Cubanas Internacionales C-54B (NC44567, named Ruta de Colon) crashed in the Gredos Mountains, Spain, killing all 11 on board.

15 February 1947
An Avianca DC-4 (C-114) crashed into Mount Tablazo, Colombia on a domestic Colombian flight from Barranquilla to Bogotá. All 53 aboard were killed.

29 May 1947
United Airlines Flight 521 crashed after overrunning the runway during an aborted takeoff from New York City's LaGuardia Airport on a flight to Cleveland, Ohio. Forty-one passengers and two crew died out of the 44 passengers and four crew on board.

29 May 1947
US Army Air Force C-54D 42-72553 crashed on approach to Atsugi NAS, killing all 41 on board.

30 May 1947
Eastern Air Lines Flight 605, a C-54B, dived into the ground near Bainbridge, Maryland, during a flight from Newark to Miami. The 49 passengers and four crew were killed. At the time this was the deadliest airliner crash in United States history. The cause of the dive was never determined. According to pilot and author Ernest Gann, the cause was the result of unporting, a balance destruction of the elevators by aerodynamic force. A plane flown by Civil Aeronautics Board personnel was behind Flight 605 and witnessed the entire dive.

13 June 1947
Pennsylvania Central Airlines Flight 410 struck a ridge near Charles Town, West Virginia, during a flight from Pittsburgh to Washington, D.C. The 47 passengers and three crew were killed.

3 July 1947
US Army Air Force C-54G 45-519 flying from Bermuda crashed in the Atlantic 294 mi off Florida after a loss of control caused by turbulence from a storm, killing the six crew.

21 July 1947
Argentine Air Force C-54A T-44 failed to gain altitude and crashed on takeoff from El Palomar, killing 14 of 19 on board; three on the ground also died when the aircraft ran through a crowd of spectators.

23 July 1947
Two Seaboard & Western Airlines C-54D's (N91077 and N91086) burned out in a hangar fire at St. Joseph Airport, Missouri.

19 September 1947
USAF C-54D 42-72554 crashed off Puerto San Juan, Peru following an apparent engine fire, killing all 14 on board.

26 October 1947
Pan American World Airways Flight 923, a DC-4, struck Tamgas Mountain, Alaska while operating a Seattle-Annette Island-Juneau passenger service, killing all 18 on board; the cause was never determined.

26 October 1947
AB Aerotransport Flight 1629, a DC-4-1009 (SE-BBG, named Sunnan), crashed into Mount Hymettus, Greece while on approach to Athens on a flight from Istanbul, Turkey. All 44 aboard were killed. The crew may have been unaware of their exact position at the time of the crash and were unable to see the mountain due to poor visibility in low clouds.

30 November 1947
Alaska Airlines Flight 009, a C-54A (NC91009), overran the runway on landing at Seattle/Tacoma International Airport, killing eight of 28 on board and one person on the ground.

10 December 1947
USAF C-54D 42-72572 crashed and burned shortly after takeoff from Goose Bay Airport, killing 23 of 29 on board. Falling snow was blamed.

10 March 1948
Delta Air Lines Flight 705, a DC-4 (NC37478), crashed on climbout from Chicago Municipal Airport following an unexplained loss of control, killing 12 of 13 on board.

12 March 1948
Northwest Airlines Flight 4422 crashed into Mount Sanford, Alaska, while on a flight from Anchorage, Alaska to New York City. All 24 passengers and six crew aboard died; the wreckage was located in 1999.

25 March 1948
Two USAF C-54s were damaged beyond repair by a tornado at Tinker Air Force Base.

10 April 1948
An Air France DC-4-1009 (F-BBDC) crashed on takeoff from Kano International Airport due to a maintenance error, killing one of five crew. The nosewheel had not been locked for takeoff.

12 May 1948
A Sabena DC-4-1009 (OO-CBE) crashed near Magazini in the Belgian Congo in severe weather during a flight from Léopoldville (now Kinshasa) to Libenge; of the 32 on board, only one survived. The aircraft may have flown into a tornado.

13 May 1948
USAF C-54G 45-0538 crashed near Easthampton, Massachusetts while flying on instruments in a rainstorm, killing all three on board.

18 October 1948
USAF C-54D 42-72688 struck trees in the Taunus Mountains and crashed some 20 km (12 mi) north of Frankfurt, killing the three crew. The aircraft was part of the Berlin Airlift and was returning empty from Berlin.

27 October 1948
Northwest Airlines Flight 6427, a C-54A (NC88785), crashed 34 mi north of Edmonton, Alberta, Canada due to pilot error, killing two of the five crew on board. The aircraft was operating a Minneapolis-Edmonton-Anchorage-Tokyo cargo service.

5 December 1948
USAF C-54D 42-72698 crashed shortly after takeoff from Fassberg Air Base, killing the three crew. The aircraft was part of the Berlin Airlift.

5 December 1948
USAF C-54D 42-72686 ditched in the Pacific Ocean 1,930 km (1,199 mi) southwest of Hawaii, killing four of 37 on board; the survivors were rescued 40 hours later. The aircraft was part of a flight of five carrying Air Force personnel from Okinawa to Spokane.

11 December 1948
During the Berlin Airlift, US Navy R5D-3 56502 crashed in the Taunus Mountains near Königstein im Taunus while returning from Berlin, killing one of six crew.

21 December 1948
A China National Aviation Corporation C-54B (N8342C) crashed into Basalt Island, Hong Kong on a flight from Shanghai to Hong Kong. All 35 aboard were killed, including Quentin Roosevelt II, serving as the Director of the China National Aviation Corporation.

7 January 1949
US Army Air Force C-54G 45-543 crashed near Garstang, United Kingdom due to radio compass problems leading to a navigation error, killing all six on board.

12 January 1949
During the Berlin Airlift, USAF C-54D 42-72629 crashed on approach to Frankfurt Rhein-Main Air Base in a snowstorm, killing the three crew.

18 January 1949
During the Berlin Airlift, USAF C-54G 45-563 crashed and burned 10 km (6 mi) east of Fassberg, killing the pilot.

4 February 1949
A Skyways C-54A (G-AJPL) crashed near Castel Benito Airport after the port engines failed for reasons unknown, killing one of 53 on board.

4 March 1949
During the Berlin Airlift, USAF C-54E 44-9086 crashed near Bad Langensalza, Germany due to an in-flight fire caused by an oil leak, killing the pilot.

12 July 1949
During the Berlin Airlift, USAF C-54D 42-72476, of 317th TCW/40th TCS, crashed 19 km (12 mi) west of Rathenow, Germany following problems with both right side engines, killing the three crew. The aircraft was loaded with 10 tons of coal.

15 August 1949
A Transocean Air Lines C-54A (N79998) ditched 9 mi off Lurga Point, Ireland due to fuel exhaustion caused by pilot error; all 58 on board were able to escape, but eight drowned or died of exposure.

12 September 1949
During the Berlin Airlift, USAF C-54D 42-72476 crashed 12 mi west of Rathenow, Germany after two engines failed, killing the three crew.

27 September 1949
A FAMA C-54A (LV-ABI) crashed near Castilla, Argentina following an in-flight fire, killing five of 27 on board. The aircraft was returning from a mercy mission to help victims of an earthquake in Ecuador.

1 November 1949
Eastern Air Lines Flight 537 was struck and cut in half by Bolivian Air Force Lockheed P-38 Lightning NX26927 while approaching Washington National Airport, falling into and around the Potomac River, killing all 51 passengers and the four crew on board the C-54; the P-38 pilot was seriously injured, but survived. This succeeded Eastern's Flight 605 as the deadliest airliner incident in U.S. history.

22 November 1949
USAF C-54D 42-72474 disappeared on a flight from Tacoma to Portland with six on board; the aircraft was found crashed eight days later on Mount St. Helens.

28 November 1949
An Air France C-54A (F-BELO) crashed while on approach to Bron Airport en route from Paris after it struck a tree on a small hill, killing five of 38 on board.

30 December 1949
A Bharat Airways C-54A (VT-CYK) force-landed at Comilla, Bangladesh following an apparent cargo fire; all three crew survived, but villagers had surrounded the aircraft and seven of them died when the aircraft caught fire and the fuel tanks exploded. The radio-operator was badly burned in the crash and died in a London hospital on 19 April 1950.

=== 1950s ===
22 January 1950
An Air France DC-4-1009 (F-BBDB) burned out in a hangar during maintenance at Orly Airport. During work on an engine, an electric lamp fell in a recovery tub of oil and fuel and the lamp glass broke, igniting the oil-fuel mixture. Flames reached the left wing before the fire was extinguished. Some parts and the tail went to the Centre d'Instruction de Vilgénis (CIV) while the nose section was used to repair a C-54 (F-BBDD) involved in a 1952 accident.

26 January 1950
USMC C-54D 42-72469 disappeared en route from Anchorage, Alaska to Great Falls, Montana with 44 on board.

9 February 1950
USAF C-54E 44-9091 crashed near Raynesford, Montana, killing all three on board.

21 April 1950
USAF C-54D 42-72704 struck Mount Hirugatake due to a navigation error, killing all 35 on board. En route to Tachikawa, the pilot radioed that he was over the O-Shima radio range station when in fact he was actually some 40 km (25 mi) southwest of O-Shima. The aircraft descended over mountainous terrain and later struck the mountain.

1950 Air France multiple Douglas DC-4 accidents
On 12 June, an Air France DC-4 (F-BBDF, Ciel de Picardie) on a flight from Saigon to Paris crashed in the Arabian Sea while on approach to Bahrain Airport, killing 46 of 52 on board. Two days later, on 14 June, another Air France DC-4 (F-BBDM, Ciel de Gascogne) also crashed in the Arabian Sea while on approach to Bahrain Airport, killing 40 of 53 on board. This aircraft was operating on the same flight route as F-BBDF. A 1950 investigation blamed the crashes on pilot error, but after the wreckage of F-BBDM was found on the seabed in 1994, it was determined that severe weather, specifically microbursts, brought down both DC-4s.

23 June 1950
Northwest Orient Airlines Flight 2501 disappeared over Lake Michigan en route from New York City to Seattle. Light debris, upholstery and human body fragments were found floating in the lake, but the airframe and identifiable remains of the 55 passengers and three crew have never been located, and the cause of the accident is still unknown.

26 June 1950
An Australian National Airways DC-4-1009 departed Perth and crashed 19 minutes later near York, Western Australia. A total of 28 occupants were killed in the impact and one passenger survived the crash. The survivor died five days later in a Perth hospital. The aircraft suffered a total loss of engine power on at least one occasion, followed by rapid loss of height until it struck the ground. The aircraft was registered VH-ANA and named Amana.

30 June 1950
USAF C-54G 45-518 struck a 2000 foot hill 5 mi (8 km) northwest of Busan, South Korea, killing all 23 on board.

29 July 1950
USAF C-54D 42-72700 struck Mount La Perouse, Alaska (156 km (97 mi) west of Juneau), killing all six on board.

6 September 1950
USAF C-54D 42-72583 crashed shortly after takeoff from Itami Airport, killing all 11 on board, including three INS journalists.

19 September 1950
USN R5D-3 56496 crashed in the sea shortly after takeoff from Kwajalein NAS en route to Tokyo, killing all 26 on board, including 11 nurses.

26 September 1950
USAF C-54B 42-72457 crashed in the sea just after takeoff from Ashiya Air Base, Japan, killing 23 of 51 on board. The aircraft was part of the Allied airlift carrying troops and supplies to Korea.

13 November 1950
A C-54B operated by Curtiss Reid Flying Services crashed into Tête de l'Obiou during a flight from Rome to Paris. The 51 passengers and 7 crew aboard were all killed.

8 December 1950
A Transports Aériens Intercontinentaux C-54A, (F-BELB) crashed after takeoff on a flight from Bangui, Ubangi-Shari (now the Central African Republic), to Dar es Salaam, Tanganyika (now Tanzania). 46 of the 56 aboard were killed.

14 January 1951
National Airlines Flight 83, a DC-4-1009 (N74685) ran off the runway on landing at Philadelphia International Airport due to pilot error, killing seven of 28 on board.

31 January 1951
Portuguese Air Force C-54D 282 crashed in the Atlantic Ocean while on approach to Lajes AFB, Azores, killing all 14 on board.

3 February 1951
An Air France DC-4-1009 (F-BBDO, named Ciel de Savoie) struck Cameroon Mountain after the crew intentionally deviated from the flight path, killing all 29 on board.

11 March 1951
A Pacific Overseas Airlines R5D-1 (HS-POS, named City of Ayudhya) crashed in the hills on Hong Kong Island while en route to Bangkok, killing all 24 on board.

25 April 1951
Cubana de Aviación Flight 493, traveling from Miami, Florida to Havana, Cuba, collided in midair off Key West, Florida, with U.S. Navy Beechcraft SNB-1 Kansan 39939 on an instrument training flight. All 43 in both aircraft (34 passengers and five crew on the Cubana flight and four in the Beechcraft) were killed.

30 May 1951
US Navy R5D-3 56513 struck a mountain at the southern end of Pusan West Air Base (also known as K-1 Airfield), South Korea, killing the five crew.

13 July 1951
A Siamese Airways C-54B (HS-POA, named City of Bangkok) crashed on takeoff from Bangkok International Airport due to overloading; there were no casualties, but the aircraft was written off.

21 July 1951
Canadian Pacific Air Lines Flight 3505, a C-54A, disappeared (probably while flying over Alaska) on a flight from Vancouver, British Columbia, Canada to Anchorage, Alaska. No trace of the aircraft or of its 31 passengers and six crew has ever been found. The cause of the accident remains undetermined.

17 November 1951
An Overseas National Airways C-54D (N79992) collided in midair with a California Eastern DC-4 (N4002B) over Oakland Range, California, killing the three crew on board N79992; N4002B landed safely at San Francisco Airport.

24 November 1951
An El Al Douglas DC-4 (4X-ADN) struck trees and crashed on approach to Kloten Airport while flying too low, killing six of seven crew on board.

19 January 1952
Northwest Orient Airlines Flight 324, a C-54E (N45342) on its way from Anchorage, Alaska, to Tacoma, Washington, attempted a precautionary landing at Sandspit, British Columbia, due to a failed engine. The landing was aborted and the aircraft crashed into the sea. Thirty-six out of 43 aboard died.

26 March 1952
Braniff International Airways Flight 65, a C-54A (N65143) overran the runway and crashed at Hugoton Airport following an unexplained engine fire; all 49 on board survived, but the aircraft was written off.

7 April 1952
USAF C-54D 43-17210 was being ferried from Great Falls to Oakland when it crashed and burned on a mountain near Jefferson City, Montana while flying through snow, killing the three crew.

11 April 1952
Pan Am Flight 526A suffered engine failure and was forced to ditch in the Atlantic 11 miles (18 km) north of San Juan, Puerto Rico; 52 of 69 on board died.

29 April 1952
An Air France Douglas C-54A (F-BELI) operating a scheduled service from Frankfurt Rhein-Main Airport to Berlin Tempelhof Airport came under sustained attack from two Soviet MiG-15 fighters while passing through one of the Allied air corridors over East Germany. Although the attack had severely damaged the plane, necessitating the shutdown of engines number three and four, the pilot in command of the aircraft managed to carry out a safe emergency landing at Tempelhof Airport. A subsequent inspection of the aircraft's damage revealed that it had been hit by 89 shots fired from the Soviet MiGs. There were no fatalities among the 17 occupants (six crew, 11 passengers) despite the severity of the attack. The Soviet military authorities defended this attack on an unarmed civilian aircraft by claiming the Air France plane was outside the air corridor at the time of attack.

11 November 1952
A UAT C-54B (F-BFVO) crashed near Fort Lamy Airport, Chad, killing fie of six on board.

28 November 1952
USAF C-54G 45-494 struck trees and crashed during an aborted approach to McChord AFB at night in thick fog, killing 37 of 39 on board.

6 December 1952
A Cubana de Aviación DC-4 crashed after takeoff on a flight from Bermuda to Havana. 37 were killed out of the 41 on board (33 passengers and 8 crew).

7 January 1953
Flying Tiger Line Flight 841 (a C-54B, N86574) struck the base of Squak Mountain, Washington after the flight deviated from approach procedure, killing all seven on board.

16 January 1953
USAF C-54D 42-72558 crashed in rocky train while on final approach to Harmon AFB, Canada, killing 13 of 14 on board.

7 February 1953
A UAT C-54A (F-BFGR) crashed on approach to Bordeaux due to pilot error and possible crew fatigue, killing nine of 21 on board.

20 March 1953
Transocean Air Lines Flight 942 (a C-54G, N88942) lost control for reasons unknown and crashed while on approach during a flight from Roswell, New Mexico, to Oakland, California. All 35 on board were killed.

4 April 1954
An Autrex C-54A (F-BFGQ) struck a tree while on approach to Gia Lam Airport and crashed in the Red River, killing the four crew.

23 July 1954
A Cathay Pacific Airways C-54A Skymaster civilian airliner, registration VR-HEU, en route from Bangkok to Hong Kong was shot down by two Chinese Communist La-9 fighters off the coast of Hainan Island, killing 10 of 18 on board.

4 September 1954
USN R5D-3 56520 crashed in Chesapeake Bay shortly after takeoff from Norfolk NAS, killing all seven on board.

6 March 1955
USAF C-54D 43-17208 struck the side of a mountain 20 mi (32 km) northwest of Taitung, Taiwan, killing all 14 on board.

3 June 1955
A UAT C-54A (F-BFVT) overturned on landing and crashed at Fort Lamy Airport (now N'Djamena Airport), killing the three crew.

24 September 1955
Flying Tiger Line Flight 7413-23, a C-54A (N90433), ditched in the Pacific Ocean 1,600 km (994 mi) west off Honolulu following triple engine failure caused by fuel exhaustion, killing three of the five crew on board.

2 October 1955
A Faucett Peru C-54A (OB-PAZ-228) crashed in mountainous terrain near Vińac, Peru while attempting an emergency landing following an engine fire, killing 21 of 35 on board.

6 October 1955
United Airlines Flight 409 crashed into Medicine Bow Peak during a flight from Denver, Colorado to Salt Lake City, Utah. All 63 passengers and three crew aboard died. At the time, this was the deadliest airline crash in U.S. commercial aviation history.

17 November 1955
Peninsular Air Transport Flight 17K, a C-54 (N88852), crashed on climbout from Boeing Field due to propeller problems caused by maintenance errors, killing 28 of 74 on board.

17 November 1955
USAF MC-54M 44-9068 struck Mount Charleston, Nevada en route to Area 51 due to a navigation error, killing all 14 on board. The aircraft was used to fly scientific and technical personnel from the Lockheed Skunk Works to Area 51 for work on the U-2. To maintain secrecy, the C-54 was not in contact with ATC. The pilot attempted a new route that would cut the flight by 10 minutes, but the aircraft was blown off course by a storm front and got lost in clouds. The pilots made an error in the assumed position of the aircraft to the Spring Mountain range and the aircraft struck the mountain.

11 December 1955
USAF C-54M 44-9094 struck a mountain near Ketama, Morocco, killing all eight on board.

17 February 1956
USN R5D-2 39116 struck Sunol Ridge (near Niles, California) due to crew errors, killing all 40 on board.

15 November 1956
A Guest Aerovias Mexico C-54A (XA-HEG) crashed near Puerto Somoza, Nicaragua while attempting a belly landing following an unexplained in-flight fire, killing all 25 on board.

22 January 1957
USN R5D-3 50869 crashed in poor weather southeast of Ypsilanti, Michigan on approach to Willow Run Airport. The pilots had announced their intention to descend to 800 feet and divert to Naval Air Station Grosse Ile if the runway was not in sight. The aircraft struck the ground as a result of frozen moisture in the pitot drain, which caused an incorrect altimeter reading, killing one of seven on board.

2 March 1957
Alaska Airlines Flight 100, a C-54B (N90449), struck hilly terrain near Blyn, Washington en route to Seattle from Fairbanks due to pilot and navigation errors, killing all five on board.

13 May 1957
United States Overseas Airlines Flight 736, a C-54A (N68736), crashed on the ice cap 111 km (69 mi) northwest of Narsarsuaq, Greenland, killing two of the three crew; the co-pilot survived and was rescued 12 hours later.

11 August 1957
Maritime Central Airways Flight 315, a DC-4, lost control in severe weather and crashed near Issoudun, Quebec while on a flight from London to Toronto via Keflavík, Iceland, and Montreal. All 79 people aboard were killed.

2 November 1957
An Air France C-54 (F-BHKY) burned out at Toulouse; no casualties.

2 November 1957
A Real Aerovias (Brazil) DC-4, registration PP-AXS, S/N 7467, former United States Army Air Force 42-107448, ditched at Praia da Baleia (Sao Sebastiao SP vicinity) following an uncontrolled fire and detachment of #2 engine, while en route from São Paulo to Rio de Janeiro, leg of flight from Buenos Aires to Miami. All 30 passengers and 8 crew survived.

3 November 1957
A Karl Herfurtner Düsseldorf C-54A (D-ALAF) was being ferried from Düsseldorf to New York via Reykjavik when it crashed shortly after takeoff from Düsseldorf Airport, killing six of 10 on board and one person on the ground. The pilot was planning to test another pilot on the flight and was practicing a two-engine takeoff when the aircraft crashed. The pilot was also reported to have often brought about dangerous situations in flight, ostensibly to conduct emergency drills. This entailed flying the aircraft with one engine out, frequently during takeoff and while carrying passengers.

8 December 1957
Aerolíneas Argentinas Flight 670, a DC-4 (LV-AHZ), broke up in severe weather and crashed near Bolívar, Argentina while on a domestic flight from Buenos Aires to San Carlos de Bariloche. All 61 aboard were killed.

1 February 1958
A Lóide Aéreo Nacional Douglas DC-4 registration PP-LEM operating the night flight 730 to Fortaleza, experienced a failure of engine no. 4 during takeoff from Rio de Janeiro-Santos Dumont. The takeoff was aborted and 100 m before the end of the runway, a tire from the landing gear burst, causing the aircraft to run off the side of the runway and burst into flames. Of the 72 passengers and crew aboard, five died.

11 August 1958
A Lóide Aéreo Nacional Douglas DC-4 (PP-LEQ) crashed in Maraso Bay off Carnapijo Island, Pará while on a night time visual approach to Belém-Val de Cans. Of the 11 passengers and crew aboard, 1 passenger survived. The cause of the crash was never determined.

22 December 1958
A USAF C-54 disappeared on a flight from Elmendorf AFB to Shemya AFB with 15 on board. The aircraft was found a few days later on an avalanche on Mount Iliamna, but the victims were never recovered.

15 January 1959
A USAF C-54 struck a wooded hillside in fog near Bradley Field, Connecticut due to compass failure; of the three crew, only the pilot survived.

23 June 1959
Avianca Flight 667, a Douglas DC-4 (HK-135), struck the side of Cerro Baco, killing all 14 on board. The aircraft had deviated from the fight route possibly due to a navigation error or instrument failure.

12 September 1959
A Pam Am DC-4 (N88900, named Clipper Fearless) struck a mountain near Tegucigalpa, Honduras following an unexplained course change, killing the three crew.

24 September 1959
Reeve Aleutian Airways Flight 3, a C-54B (N63396) crashed on Great Sitkin Island, Alaska after the pilot failed to maintain VFR while in descent, killing all 16 on board.

4 November 1959
Wheeler Airlines Flight 1658, a C-54A (CF-ILI) broke up in midair and crashed near St. Cleophas, Canada following an unexplained engine fire and resultant wing separation, killing the five crew.

21 November 1959
Ariana Afghan Airlines Flight 202 crashed on climbout from Beirut International Airport on a flight from Beirut, Lebanon to Kabul, Afghanistan due to a navigation error and possible engine fire, killing 24 of 27 aboard (23 passengers and five crew).

=== 1960s ===
5 February 1960
A Lloyd Aéreo Boliviano DC-4 (registration CP-609) crashed after takeoff on a domestic Bolivian flight from Cochabamba to La Paz following an engine explosion; all 59 on board died. The aircraft was overloaded and one of the engines could not handle the excess weight of the aircraft.

14 April 1960
Royal Thai Air Force DC-4-1009 42919 struck the side of Wuzhi Mountain near Taipei, killing all 18 on board, including the RTAF chief and other officials.

22 April 1960
A Sobelair C-54A (OO-SBL) struck Pic de Bogoro while descending to Bunia, DR Congo, killing all 35 on board. The pilot began descending while the cloud base was too low.

15 May 1960
A Balair DC-4-1009 (HB-ILA) was being ferried from Jeddah to Dakar when it crashed in the Djebel Marr Mountains (near Tora-Tonga, Sudan) due to a navigation error, killing the 12 crew.

22 September 1960
USMC R5D-3 56541 crashed in the Pacific Ocean 290 km (180 mi) southeast of Okinawa following an in-flight fire and explosion, killing all 29 on board. En route to Luzon, the crew radioed that the number three engine had caught fire and that they were diverting to Okinawa. The engine fire was extinguished, but a tire was still burning. This fire later spread to the fuel tank and the aircraft exploded.

28 October 1960
Northwest Orient Airlines Flight 104, a C-54A (N48762), lost control and crashed 32 km (20 mi) west of Missoula, Montana due to pilot error, killing all 12 on board. The pilot was flying VFR in IMC.

24 May 1961
Trans Australia Airlines Flight 1902, a Douglas DC-4-1009 (VH-TAA) crashed on Bulwer Island (near Eagle Farm Airport), killing both pilots. The captain suffered a heart attack and attempted to leave his seat, but collapsed on the engine control console, throttling back all four engines to idle. The co-pilot was unable to move the throttle levers and the aircraft crashed.

13 June 1961
An Air Cameroun DC-4 (TJ-ABC) crashed at Douala Airport during a training flight, killing all six on board. The aircraft had been flying too low.

17 June 1961
A Continentale Deutsche Reederei C-54B (D-ABEB) crashed short of the runway at Kano International Airport due to pilot error and pilot fatigue, killing one of seven on board.

4 August 1961
An Iranian Airways DC-4 (EP-ADK) was attacked by an unidentified aircraft after flying over Russian territory, damaging the number one engine nacelle and wing structure. The engine later caught fire and was shut down. The number four engine was also shut down due to low fuel. The aircraft made a wheels-up forced landing on the coast of the Caspian Sea near Rudsar. Despite the attack, all three crew survived. Faulty navigation was blamed.

15 September 1961
An Air Katanga DC-4-1009 (OO-ADN) was destroyed on the ground at Elizabethville Airport by a bomb dropped from Katangese Air Force Fouga Magister 93; no casualties.

16 September 1961
A Starways C-54C (G-APIN) was destroyed on the ground at Kamina Airport by a Katangese Air Force Fouga Magister; no casualties.

3 May 1962
An Indian Airlines C-54A (VT-CZT) burned out in a hangar fire at Dum Dum Airport.

30 June 1962
South African Airways DC-4-1009 ZS-BMH named "Lebombo" (The last DC-4 built) miraculously survived a midair collision with SAAF NA Harvard (Texan) 7464 whilst on approach to Durban airport. More than half the tailplane and rudder were sliced off by the impact. The DC-4 made a safe landing with its 5 crew and 54 passengers. The two crew of the Harvard successfully bailed out. ZS-BMH was repaired and returned to service, serving later with the SAAF as 6904 from 1966 to 1993.

9 July 1962
Trans Mediterranean Airways Flight 104, a DC-4-1009 (OD-AEC), crashed off Papola Casale Airport due to loss of engine power and crew fatigue, killing the six crew.

16 November 1962
Colombian Air Force C-54D FAC-693 struck Cerro Guayatama (near Suárez, Tolima) during a training flight, killing the five crew.

16 November 1962
Argentine Air Force C-54A TC-46, crashed with Gaital hill near Valle de Anton, Panama, in a night flight from Managua, Nicaragua. The 9 crew member were killed.

22 November 1962
Portuguese Air Force C-54D 7502 crashed after takeoff on São Tomé airport and exploded on a coconut grove, killing 22 of the 37 passengers and crew on board. The aircraft was possibly overloaded.

22 January 1963
Portuguese Air Force C-54E 6601 ditched off Las Palmas; the aircraft and 11 occupants were found the next morning, but three on board were never found.

3 April 1963
Argentine Navy C-54A 0290/CTA-2 was destroyed on the ground at Punta Indio Naval Base during an Argentine Air Force attack.

5 May 1963
A Paraense Transportes Aéreos DC-4 (PP-BTR) was struck in the wingtip by a Varig DC-6B (PP-YSI) at Congonhas Airport, suffering severe damage.

24 October 1963
A Danish Government C-54A (TF-IST) burned out in a hangar fire at Narsarsuaq Airport along with Danish Air Force Catalinas L-862 and L-864. The C-54 was leased from Icelandair.

12 December 1963
A Trans Mediterranean Airways C-54A (OD-AEB) crashed in the Koh-i-Safid Mountains (93 km (58 mi) west of Ghazni, Afghanistan due to a navigation error, killing the three crew; wreckage was found on 16 August 1964. The crew had incorrectly estimated wind speed and direction and this blew the aircraft off course by 42 miles.

6 February 1964
USN C-54Q 56522 crashed and burned in wooden terrain near Calverton, New York; killing six of eight on board.

10 March 1964
Slick Airways Flight 12, a DC-4 (N384), crashed while on approach to Boston Logan International Airport, killing all 3 occupants. Ice accumulation on the horizontal stabilizer caused the aircraft to pitch down and lose control.

28 March 1964
A Facilities Management Corp. C-54A (N4726V) disappeared over the Pacific (about 1120 km west of San Francisco – last reported position: 29.33°N 135.00°W) on an executive passenger flight from Honolulu International Airport, Hawaii to Los Angeles International Airport, California. The pilot reported a fire in engine number two, which might make it necessary to ditch. Nothing more was heard from the aircraft, nor was any trace of it found despite an extensive search. Three crew and 6 passengers died in the accident.

8 May 1964
Argentine Air Force C-54A TC-47 crashed into a sand dune in poor visibility 12 miles north from Lima, Peru, on a non program international flight from Buenos Aires, Argentina to Lima. killing 46 of 49 aboard (42 passengers and 7 crew).
29 June 1964
USAF HC-54D 42-72590 collided in mid-air with USAF HC-97G 52-2773 off Bermuda while training pararescue crews for the Gemini program, killing all 17 on board both aircraft.

1 June 1964
USN R5D-2 50867 burned out while parked at Twin Cities NARTU.

30 June 1964
A Zantop Air Transport C-54A (N188S) burned out at an unknown location.

29 November 1964
An Air Congo DC-4 (OO-DEP) lost control and crashed on takeoff from N'djili Airport after a fuel drum hit the right stabilizer and causing it to partially fail, killing six of 14 on board.

11 June 1965
An Air Algérie C-54A (7T-VAC) was written off at Dar el Beida Airport.

4 August 1965
A Rutas Internacionales Peruanes SA (RIPSA) C-54D (OB-R-769) crashed shortly after takeoff following an engine failure and fire, killing all seven on board. Faulty maintenance was blamed.

3 November 1965
Argentine Air Force C-54G TC-48 disappeared in the Costa Rican jungle or Caribbean Sea with 68 on board. En route from Howard Air Force Base to El Salvador International Airport. 25 lifebuoys, personal belongings and some wreckage were found in Bocas del Toro Archipelago, but the airplane or bodies were never found.

14 January 1966
Avianca Flight 03, a C-54B (HK-730), crashed on takeoff on a domestic Colombian flight from Cartagena to Bogotá. 56 out of 64 aboard died.

21 January 1967
Air Ferry Flight 200, a C-54A (G-ASOG) crashed short of the runway at Frankfurt Airport, killing both pilots. The altimeters had been set incorrectly and indicated 200 feet higher than the actual altitude.

10 March 1967
USAF C-54D 42-72561 suffered a ground accident at Tachikawa, Japan.

11 April 1967
An Air Algérie DC-4 (7T-VAU) struck the side of a mountain near Tamanrasset Airport while flying too low, killing 35 of 39 on board.

3 June 1967
An Air Ferry C-54A (G-APYK) crashed into Mont Canigou on a flight from Manston Airport, England to Perpignan, France. All 88 aboard were killed, the greatest fatalities of any DC-4 crash.

19 July 1967
An Air Madagascar DC-4-1009 (5R-MAD) stalled and crashed shortly after takeoff from Ivato Airport following an unexplained engine explosion, killing 42 of 77 on board.

8 December 1967
A Faucett C-54A (OB-R-148) struck a mountain in the Cordillera de Carpish, killing all 72 on board.

10 January 1968
C54 Navy/Marine variant crash impact on east side of Mount Tobin, Nevada. 19 persons killed, cause was reported by pilot prior to impact as losing altitude due to heavy icing on wings, impact occurred near peak of 9778 feet

22 May 1968
USAF VC-54G 45-585 crashed short of the runway at Hanscom AFB, killing one of four on board.

18 August 1968
A Rutas Internacionales Peruanes SA (RIPSA) C-54D (OB-R-849) was written off at an unknown location.

28 September 1968
A Pan African Airlines C-54B (N90427) struck trees and crashed while on approach to Port Harcourt Airport, killing all 57 on board and one person on the ground. The plane also carried munitions, causing explosions and a massive fire.

28 December 1968
A Trans Mediterranean Airways C-54B (OD-ADI) was destroyed while parked at Beirut International Airport during an Israeli attack. The attack was in retaliation for a terrorist attack on a Boeing aircraft in Athens.

9 March 1969
A Continental Air Transport DC-4 (N3821) disappeared on a cargo flight over the North Atlantic from Halifax International Airport to Santa Maria Airport (Azores); three crew were lost in the accident.

1 May 1969
An Air Vietnam C-54B (registration F-BELL) burned out on the ground at Saigon Airport.

24 May 1969
A Pan African Airlines DC-4 (N9982H) was destroyed on the ground at Benin City Airport by a Biafran MFI-9B attack.

July 1969
An Air Fret C-54A (F-OCNU) as destroyed on the round at Uli Airstrip. The aircraft was part of the Biafran airlift, an international humanitarian effort to transport food and medicine to Biafra during the 1967-1970 secession war from Nigeria.

20 September 1969
An Air Vietnam C-54D (registration XV-NUG) crashed near Da Nang Airport after it was struck by a USAF F-4 Phantom, killing 74 of 75 on board and two farm workers on the ground.

13 October 1969
USAF C-54D 42-72611 crashed in Alaska en route from Anchorage to King Salmon, killing all four on board. Wreckage was found in 1972.

10 November 1969
A Pan African Airlines DC-4-1009 (N480G) was destroyed on the ground at Port Harcourt Airport by a Malmö MFI-9.

=== 1970s ===
19 December 1971
An Aero Palas C-54A (LV-JPG) struck Cerro Huayca, Peru, killing all six on board.

11 February 1972
A Royal Air Lao C-54A (XW-TDE) disappeared on a flight from Saigon to Vientiane via Savannakhet with 23 on board; the aircraft was probably shot down.

24 September 1972
An Air Vietnam C-54 D (XV-NUH) crashed in a marsh near Ben Cat, Vietnam (23 miles from Saigon), killing 10 of 13 on board.

19 March 1973
An Air Vietnam Douglas C-54D (XV-NUI) crashed on approach to Buon Me Thuot, Vietnam following an unexplained mid-air explosion, killing all 58 on board. A bomb was not ruled out.

27 December 1973
An Avianca C-54 (HK-1027) burned out at Cartagena Airport following a fuel tank explosion near engine four.

10 January 1974
TAM-52 a DC-4 operated by Transporte Aéreo Militar (the civil air service of the Bolivian Air Force) crashed into Mount Mik'aya on a non-scheduled passenger flight from Santa Rosa de Yacuma Airport to El Alto International Airport, La Paz, killing all 24 people on board. The wreckage was found in 2000.

18 January 1974
A non scheduled Bush Aviation Douglas DC-4 flight crashed in San Cristobal de las Casas, Mexico killing all ten on board, 3 crew and 7 passengers.

20 February 1974
An Air Vietnam C-54A (XV-NUM) was hijacked by a man demanding to be taken to Dong Hoi, North Vietnam. The pilot informed the hijacker the plane needed to stop at Dong Ha to refuel, but the pilot landed at Hue, South Vietnam instead. Realizing that he had been tricked, the hijacker detonated explosives, killing three passengers. A 2 m × 3 m (6.6 ft × 9.8 ft) hole was blown in the side of the aircraft and three windows were broken.

4 April 1974
A Wenela Air Services DC-4 (A2-ZER) crashed near Francistown Airport following loss of power from all four engines due to contaminated fuel, killing 78 of 84 on board. The aircraft had been refueled with avgas contaminated with jet fuel.

15 July 1974
A China Airlines C-54A (B-1811) was written off at Battambang Airport. The aircraft was leased from Air Cambodge.

24 July 1974
An Aeronorte Colombia DC-4 (HK-728) struck a mountain near El Libano, Colombia, killing the three crew.

28 November 1974
A China Airlines C-54B (B-1801) was shot down near An Loc, Vietnam during a flight from Phnom Penh to Hong Kong, killing the three crew.

29 November 1974
Honduras Air Force C-54D FAH-799 crashed near Cerro de la Muerte, killing the four crew. Wreckage was found on 16 May 1975.

12 March 1975
An Air Vietnam Douglas C-54D (XV-NUJ) crashed 25 km (16 mi) southwest of Pleiku, Vietnam, killing all 26 on board. Wreckage not examined due to hostilities in area. The aircraft was probably shot down.

10 April 1975
A Royal Air Lao C-54A (XW-PKH) was destroyed on the ground at Pochentong Airport during a Khmer Rouge attack.

30 June 1975
A Taxi Aereo El Venado DC-4 (HK-1309) crashed in the foothills of the Cordillera, killing the three crew.

15 January 1976
A Taxi Aereo El Venado C-54A (HK-172) struck a mountain 30 km (19 mi) east of Chipaque, Colombia, killing all 13 on board.

24 March 1976
Three Royal Air Lao aircraft, two C-54s and a R5D-1, were written off in a storm at Wattay Airport.

9 August 1976
Spanish Air Force C-54E T.4-11 crashed and burned in a hilly wooden area at Vejer de la Frontera, killing all 12 on board.

30 December 1976
A Faucett Douglas C-54A (OB-R-247) struck Mount Cerro Pintado 7 minutes after takeoff from Trujillo, killing all 24 on board.

22 March 1977
DC-4 lands at Hanover VA Municipal Airport, gets stuck in mud -7,000 lbs marijuana found on board

26 November 1977
An African Lux C-54B (9Q-CAM) was shot down over Tete Province, Mozambique during a flight from Rhodesia to Zaire; both pilots survived.

30 January 1978
Chad Air Force DC-4-1009 TT-NAA was struck by a SA-7 missile en route from N'Djamena to Faya, hitting the left wing and starting a fire in engine two. The propeller separated, followed by the engine. The fire spread to the wing while the crew began descending. A forced landing was performed in the desert 55 km (34 mi) west of Faya-Largeau.

28 June 1978
Vietnam Civil Aviation Flight 501 was hijacked by eight people who were equipped with a Makarov pistol, knives and a grenade. The hijackers had a gunfight with crew members and security guards. One was killed by grenade, three jumped out from the aircraft and were killed. Four others were captured by the police after landing.

17 October 1978
A C-54 crashed at Hacienda del Cesar at Valledupar, Colombia while carrying marijuana, killing the three crew.

16 December 1978
A C-54 crashed and burned in Cesar Department, Colombia while attempting to land at a hacienda, killing the pilot, who was found burned in the wreckage. The aircraft was carrying marijuana.

19 November 1979
A Tiburon Aircraft Inc RC-54V (N8060C) struck trees on approach and crashed near McCormick, South Carolina, killing both pilots. The aircraft was carrying 15,000 lb (6,804 kg) of marijuana.

18 December 1979
A SATENA C-54D (FAC-1106) crashed into Mount Cerro Toledo at 3,400 m (11,155 ft), killing all 21 on board.

=== 1980s ===
24 November 1980
South African Air Force DC-4-1009 6903 (ex South African Airways ZS-BMG) burned out at Rand Airport whilst being serviced.

2 December 1980
US Forest Service C-54Q N96449, "T1", was taking photographs of a second C-54 airtanker (N406WA, "T2") when it struck the right wing flap of T2. The fin and rudder of T1 were sheared off, the top rear portion of T1s fuselage was compressed by the retardant tanks of T2 and the number two propeller severed T1s fuselage about 10 feet in front of the horizontal stabilizer. The tail section separated and T1 crashed out of control, killing both pilots while T2 was able to land safely. T1's tail section was found 2.5 miles from the main wreckage. The aircraft were too close together.

28 March 1981
A Caribbean Air Cargo C-54B (N98AS) ditched off St. Croix after a loss of control following an engine fire, killing one of two crew.

14 July 1981
An Aero Union SC-54G (N3373F) crashed near Kenai Airport after a portion of a wing separated following an engine failure and fire, killing all three on board.

21 January 1982
French Navy C-54E 49148 struck Mt. Kokoréta at 1,002 m (3,287 ft) during a training flight, killing the seven crew.

8 June 1983
A Frigorifico Reyes VC-54Q (CP-1404) crashed on landing at Trinidad Airport after diverting from Palmira, killing five.

13 January 1984
A North East Bolivian Airways EC-54U (CP-1090)ran off the runway on landing at J Wilsterman Airport while returning due to engine failure, killing one of three crew.

24 March 1984
A Frigorifico Reyes C-54S (CP-1206) crashed shortly after takeoff from Rurrenabaque due to engine problems, killing all five on board.

19 June 1986
A L.A. Suramericanas C-54D (HK-1808) crashed near La Macarena Airport while attempting to return following engine failure, killing the three crew.

23 August 1988
A Kinair Cargo DC-4 Swingtail (9Q-CBK) crashed near Kinshasa, killing the five crew.

=== 1990s ===
21 June 1995
An Aero Union C-54G (registration N4989P, "Tanker 19") collided in midair with a US Forest Service Beechcraft 58P Baron (N156Z, "Lead 56") near Ramona, California, killing all three on both aircraft and destroying two structures and two cars on the ground.

14 August 1996
An Air North DC-4 (former C-54, registration C-FGNI, named Yukon Trader) crashed into the Iskut River near Bronson Creek, British Columbia, Canada due to loss of control caused by an engine fire and resultant separation; all three crew were able to escape the aircraft, but the pilot was reported missing and probably drowned.

=== 2020s ===
23 April 2024

An Alaska Air Fuel C-54D (registration N3054V) crashed into the Tanana River, shortly after taking off from Fairbanks International Airport, killing both pilots. The pilots had reported loss of power in one engine and an onboard fire shortly after takeoff. NTSB investigation identified an unrepaired fuel leak within the wing space and an improperly installed B nut in the propeller feathering system spraying engine oil onto the exhaust system as the source of the explosion - however, due to extensive damage to the recovered engine, they could not identify the reason for the stated loss of power.
