= Flight 324 =

Flight 324 may refer to:

Listed chronologically

- Northwest Orient Airlines Flight 324, crashed on 19 January 1952
- Avient Aviation Flight 324, crashed during its takeoff roll on 28 November 2009
- Air Serbia Flight 324, suffered a runway excursion on 18 February 2024
