= 1965 Argentine Air Force C-54 disappearance =

Argentine military flight that disappeared on 3 November 1965

Argentine Air Force TC-48 Flight
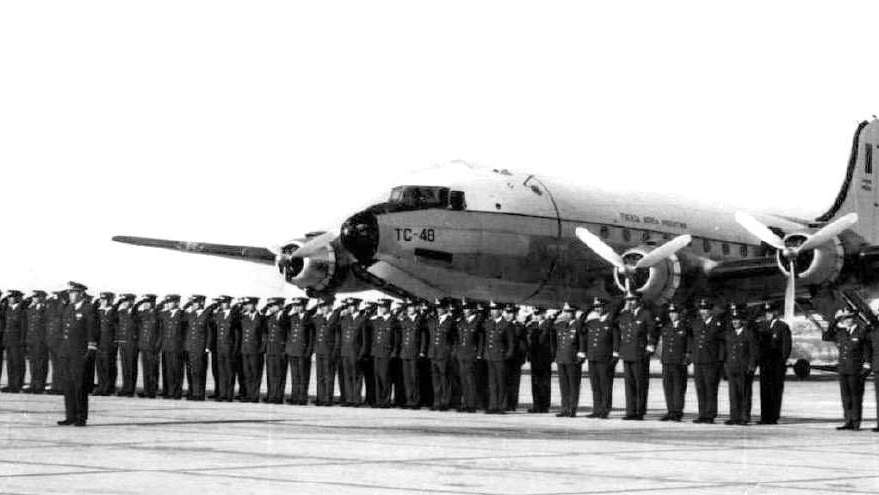
- The missing aircraft, Douglas C-54G Skymaster with cadets before departure of the initial training flight on 31 October 1965

Disappearance
- Date: 3 November 1965
- Summary: Engine fire
- Site: Northwest Cordillera de Talamanca (presumed), Southeast Golfo de los Mosquitos and Northeast Braulio Carrillo National Park

Aircraft
- Aircraft type: Douglas C-54G Skymaster
- Operator: Argentine Air Force
- Call sign: TC48
- Registration: TC-48
- Flight origin: El Palomar Airport
- Stopover: Cerro Moreno Base
- 1st stopover: Las Palmas Air Base
- 2nd stopover: Guayaquil
- Last stopover: Howard Air Force Base, Panama Canal Zone
- Destination: El Salvador International Airport
- Occupants: 68
- Passengers: 59
- Crew: 9
- Fatalities: 68 (presumed)
- Survivors: 0 (presumed)

1965 Argentine Air Force C-54 disappearance (also known as TC-48 Flight or The Cadets Flight) refers to the disappearance of an Argentine Air Force Douglas C-54 Skymaster carrying cadet graduates from the Military Aviation School that disappeared between Howard Air Force Base in Panama and El Salvador International Airport on 3 November 1965. The last contact with the aircraft was 30 or 40 minutes after take-off, when the pilot reported a fire in one of the engines and notified the control tower of San José International Airport in Costa Rica that they intended to divert there. The aircraft never arrived and all passengers and crew are missing, presumed dead. The disappearance is considered the greatest mystery of Argentine aviation.

== Flight ==
The C-54 took off from El Palomar on October 31, 1965 to the Military Aviation School. The crew consisted of 9 members; 5 officers and 54 cadets, thus totaling 68 occupants. The training flight would take them to San Francisco. During the trip, a second Douglas DC-4 was used, the TC-43 that carried the rest of the promotion. Both aircraft departed the following day, and flew to the Cerro Moreno base in Chile where, after a technical stopover, the flight continued to the Las Palmas base in Lima, Peru. There they spent the night and incorporated two cadets from the Peruvian Air Force, which were distributed in both planes. On November 2 they flew to Panama with a technical stopover in Guayaquil (Ecuador); and the next day, they had to complete the journey between the Howard Air Force Base and San Salvador International Airport (El Salvador).

== Aircraft ==
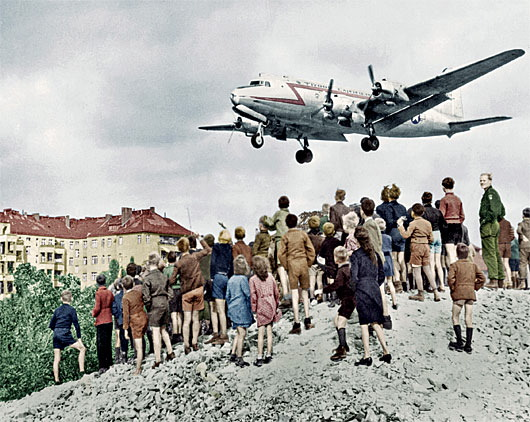
Berliners watching a C-54 land at Berlin Tempelhof Airport, 1948

The aircraft involved was a Douglas C-54G transport aircraft of the Argentine Air Force, with serial number TC-48 (msn 35983). It was first flown in 1945. It was assigned to the 1st Air Brigade based in El Palomar and immediately began to be used for relocation flights of military personnel, officials and relatives.

== Accident ==
At about 05:49, the aircraft took off from Howard Air Force Base on the Pacific side of the Panama Canal Zone with a second Douglas DC-4. The two aircraft would fly together to San Salvador International Airport, keeping sporadic radio contact for the duration of the flight.

The last two transmissions from the aircraft were at 06:27 when the DC-4 reported to Panama tower confirming that it had reached position "Mike-5" without incident at an altitude of 6500 and was heading for San Salvador. The "Mike-5" position is a navigational point close to Escudo de Veraguas island on the Panamanian Caribbean Mosquitoes Gulf of the Bocas del Toro Province. The weather conditions for this first part of the route were not the best, the forecast indicated severe turbulence, heavy rain, and visibility from very limited to zero.

At 06:36 the pilot of the C-54 reported a fire in engine 3, and engine 4 had stopped working. The crew reported that it would attempt to land or ditch the aircraft in the water. The broadcast was picked up by Tegucigalpa ATC and a Lacsa cargo plane pilot. The cargo plane pilot recommended landing at Limón International Airport or El Coco International Airport, now called Juan Santamaría International Airport, but the aircraft never arrived.

After that time, a large number of conflicting reports began to emerge, such as a third broadcast from the flight at 07:05 that said that the aircraft was flying over Bocas del Toro, heading towards Puerto Limón, where firefighters and ambulances were being mobilized while waiting for the aircraft.

=== Reported sightings ===
In 2008, Teletica journalist Gerardo Zamora interviewed several witnesses that stated the aircraft entered Costa Rican territory by Sixaola, and was also seen on Valle La Estrella, and a last witness stated that survivors were seen near Telire, all communities close to the Talamanca Range.

== Passengers and crew ==
The aircraft was carrying nine Argentine crew members. Of the 59 passengers, 53 were Argentine cadets, five Argentine military officers and one Peruvian cadet.

=== Search ===
Initial searches for survivors were made by the United States Navy until November 17, 1965 when attempts ceased. Relatives rejected the official version and continued to demand the search for the plane in the Costa Rican jungle, convinced that the aircraft could well be in some inaccessible place and not on the seabed. The suspicions were strengthened when it became known that some of the personal belongings of the missing passengers that had been supposedly recovered, had actually been transported by passengers on the other plane. In addition, at that point, it had been revealed that the aircraft was not in perfect mechanical condition and that it had been flying overweight. Relatives travelled to Central America to continue the search on their own. Groups of relatives of the cadets and officers repeatedly entered the Costa Rican jungle and made contact with the natives who lived around the Cordillera de Talamanca, looking for any clue that would allow them to find the whereabouts of their loved ones. However, they would inevitably return empty-handed.

A total of 23 expeditions were made to the Talamanca in the Costa Rica jungle, using more than 50 flights in planes and helicopters. The search was halted in 1967. According to the Civil Aviation of Costa Rica and to the relatives, the aircraft is somewhere in the jungle. In 2015 the Argentine Air Forces carried out four search missions called Esperanza, both by land and by sea, which ended without results.

== Investigation ==
After the disappearance, an investigation carried out by the United States concluded that the aircraft crashed in the sea between Panama and Costa Rica, 30 km from the coast. A de-classified video of a United States Navy (USN) helicopter marking the location of life vests and objects in the sea was later shown to family members. Argentine Air Force authorities accepted the conclusions reached by the US experts.

== In popular culture ==
=== Books ===
The book TC-48, the cadets plane, by Ricardo Becerra, a former Army lieutenant and brother of cadet Héctor, mentions thirteen witnesses who saw him fly low in the jungle.

=== Documentary ===
In December 2018 the documentary film The Last Search was released in Córdoba, Argentina in local movie theaters, in which Cecilia Viberti, pilot Esteban Viberti's daughter, describes the searches made in Talamanca, Costa Rica and shares her thoughts about whether the aircraft is located in Costa Rica.

== See also ==
- Malaysia Airlines Flight 370
- List of missing aircraft
- List of accidents and incidents involving military aircraft (1960–1974)
- List of accidents and incidents involving the Douglas DC-4
- List of aircraft of the Argentine Air Force
