= Sandspit Airport =

K'il Kun Xidgwangs Daanaay Sandspit Airport
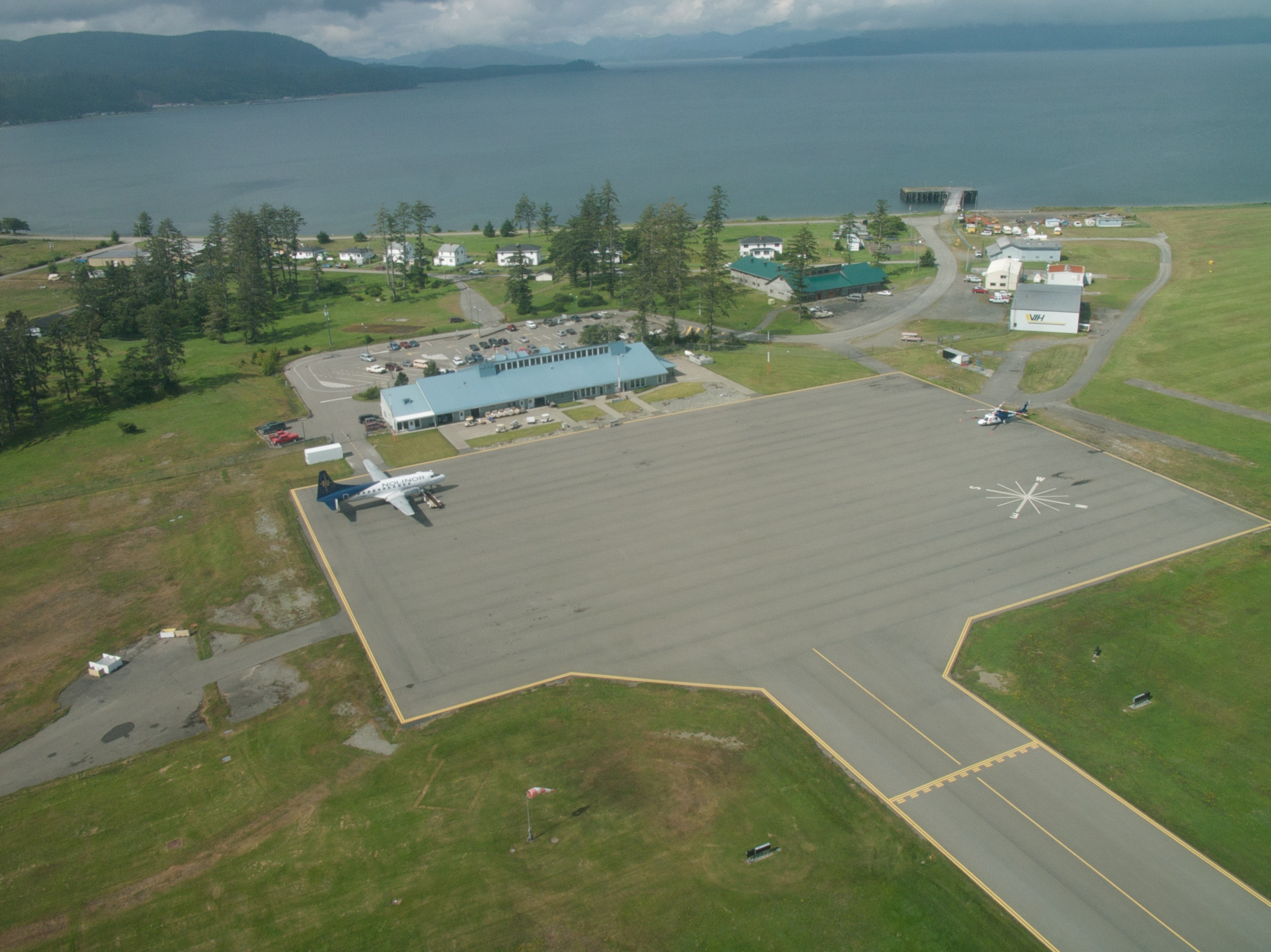
- IATA: YZP; ICAO: CYZP; WMO: 71111

Summary
- Airport type: Public
- Operator: Transport Canada
- Serves: Haida Gwaii
- Location: Sandspit, British Columbia
- Time zone: MST (UTC−07:00)
- Elevation AMSL: 21 ft / 6 m
- Coordinates: 53°15′15″N 131°48′50″W

Map
- Location in British Columbia

Runways
Direction	Length		Surface
Direction	ft	m	Surface
12/30	5,112	1,558	Asphalt

Statistics (2014)
- Aircraft movements: 4,419
- Source: Canada Flight Supplement; Environment Canada; Movements from Statistics Canada

K'il Kun Xidgwangs Daanaay (IATA: YZP, ICAO: CYZP), formerly known as Sandspit Airport, is located 1.5 nautical miles (2.8 km; 1.7 mi) northeast of Sandspit, British Columbia, Canada.

== Douglas DC-4 crash ==
On January 19, 1952, a Douglas DC-4 on Northwest Orient Airlines Flight 324 attempted to land at Sandspit Airport due to a failed engine. Although the plane touched down on the runway, it lifted off again before coming to a halt. Unable to regain its lost speed and altitude, the aircraft hit the water about 4,500 feet (1,400 m) from the end of the runway. 36 of the 43 passengers and crew aboard died due to hypothermia or drowning.

== Renaming ==
On March 27, 2024, the Council of the Haida Nation and Transport Canada announced in a press release that Sandspit Airport had been renamed K'il Kun Xidgwangs Daanaay.

== Airlines and destinations ==
Airlines	Destinations
Air Canada Express	Vancouver

== See also ==
- Alliford Bay Water Aerodrome
- List of accidents and incidents involving the Douglas DC-4
