= Northwest Orient Airlines Flight 324 =

January 1952 plane crash near Sandspit, British Columbia, Canada

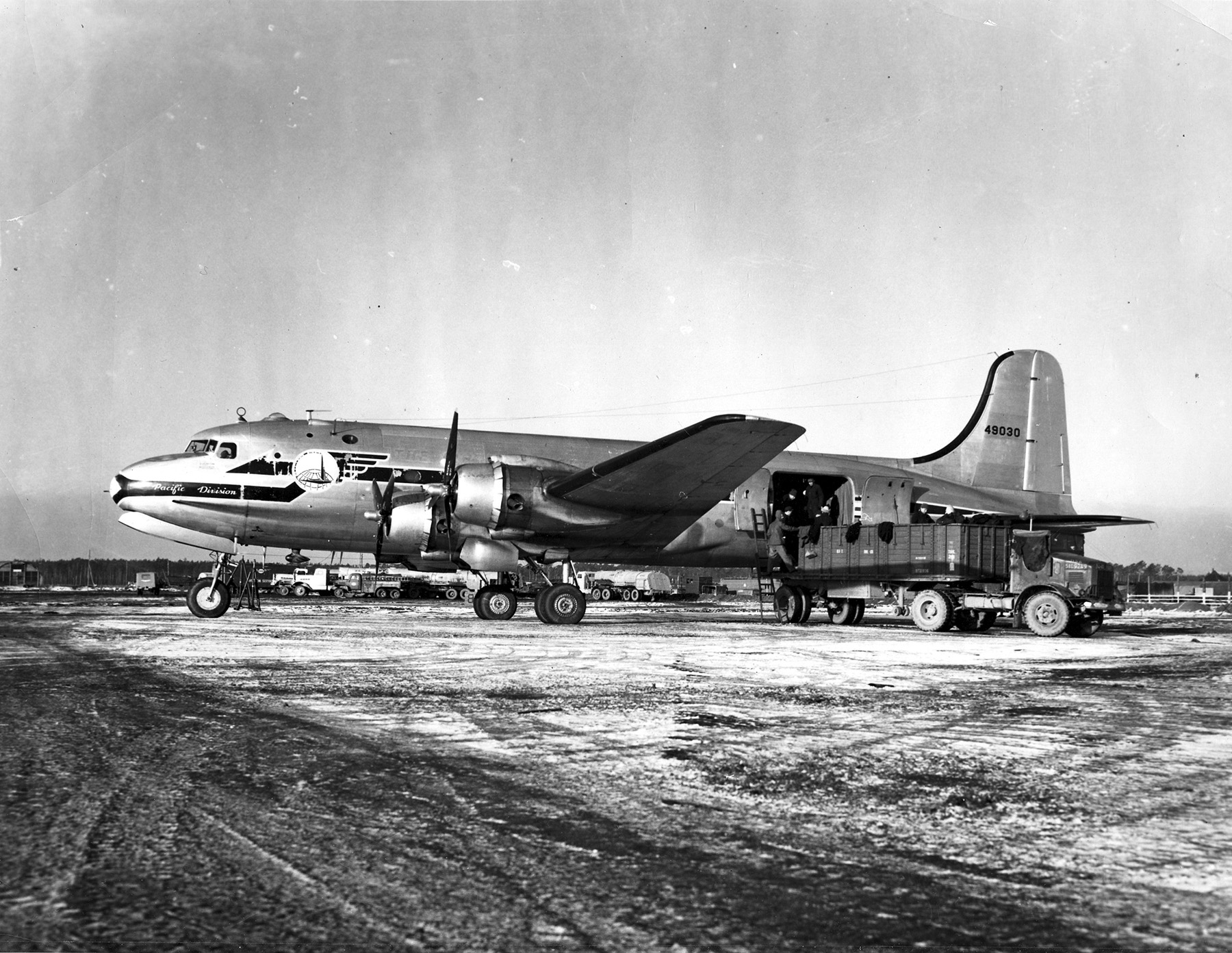
- An identical C-54

Accident
- Date: January 19, 1952
- Summary: Controlled flight into terrain due to mechanical failure in poor weather
- Site: Hecate Strait, 0.8 miles ESE of Sandspit Airport, Sandspit, British Columbia, Canada 53°15′15″N 131°48′50″W

Aircraft
- Aircraft type: Douglas DC-4 (Douglas C-54 Skymaster)
- Operator: Northwest Orient Airlines
- Registration: N45342
- Flight origin: Haneda Airport, Ōta, Tokyo, Japan
- 1st stopover: Eareckson Air Station, Shemya, Alaska, United States
- 2nd stopover: Elmendorf Air Force Base, Anchorage, Alaska, United States
- Destination: McChord Air Force Base, Lakewood, Washington, United States
- Occupants: 43
- Passengers: 40
- Crew: 3
- Fatalities: 36
- Survivors: 7

Northwest Orient Airlines Flight 324 was a military charter flight from Haneda Airport to McChord Air Force Base. On the morning of January 19, 1952, the flight crashed into Hecate Strait in British Columbia, Canada, while making an emergency landing at Sandspit Airport. All three crew members and 33 of the 40 passengers were killed, making the flight the third-deadliest aviation accident in Canada at the time.

== Background ==
=== Aircraft ===
The aircraft involved in the crash was a Douglas C-54E, serial number 27279, and was being leased to Northwest Orient Airlines by Trans World Airlines (TWA). Its first flight was in 1945, and at the time of the accident, it had 18,859 flight hours. The plane was fitted with four Pratt & Whitney R-2000 Twin Wasp engines. It passed a No. 2 check in Seattle, Washington on January 15, 1952.

=== Flight crew ===
Captain John J. Pfaffinger (age 38) had been employed by Northwest Airlines since August 4, 1942. He had 8,557 flight hours, 1,762 of which were on the DC-4.

First officer Kenneth H. Kuhn (age 32) had been employed by Northwest Airlines since September 13, 1945. He had 4,197 flight hours, 1,698 of which were on the DC-4.

There was one flight attendant on board, Jane Cheadle, who had been employed at Northwest Airlines since April 1, 1950. All flight crew members had passed physical examinations and were properly certified for the flight.

== Accident ==
The flight originated in Tokyo and was headed to McChord Air Force Base with stops in Shemya and Anchorage. In Shemya, there was a crew change and a magneto was replaced in the No. 1 engine. In Anchorage, the accident crew boarded for the last leg of the flight. Prior to departing Anchorage, weather on the flight path was forecasted to be overcast with snow/rain showers. Occasional light aircraft icing and turbulence were forecast as well.

The plane departed Elmendorf Air Force Base in Anchorage at 9:11 p.m. on January 18. The plane climbed to its 10,000 ft cruising altitude, and at 10:14 pm, shortly after passing Middleton Island, the pilots requested to descend to 8,000 ft, which the plane reached at 10:22 pm.

The flight was uneventful until the plane was over Sitka, Alaska. At 12:03 a.m. on the morning of January 19, the pilots reported a failure of engine No. 1. At 12:29 am, the pilots ascribed the engine trouble to a "broken" oil cooler and asked for weather forecasts at nearby airports in Annette, Sandspit, and Port Hardy. Weather at Annette was below minima, so the crew decided to make an emergency landing at Sandspit. The pilots gave an estimated time of arrival as 1:28 a.m. and proceeded to Sandspit on three engines.

During the landing at Sandspit, the plane touched down 1/3 down the runway. After a short time on the ground, engine power was re-applied at the midpoint of the runway and the plane took off again. It cleared a fence of driftwood at the end of the runway. The radio operator in Sandspit heard shouting and concluded the plane had crashed into Hecate Straight off the end of the runway. Search and rescue services could not find the wreckage in the limited visibility. An hour and a half after the crash, seven people were rescued from the freezing waters of the strait. It is thought that no one died in the initial crash, and that all who perished drowned or froze to death in the cold temperatures.

== Investigation ==
Since the accident occurred on Canadian soil, the Canadian government led the investigation and invited the Civil Aeronautics Board (predecessor of the National Transportation Safety Board) to send an observer. The CAB conducted its own investigation alongside the Canadian government. One of the survivors was First Lieutenant Donald E. Baker, a United States Air Force navigator. Lt. Baker was present inside the cockpit until the start of the final approach into Sandspit.

Lt. Baker advised that near Sitka, the pilots noted a rapid loss of oil pressure in engine No. 1. The engine was shut down and clearance was given to proceed to Sandspit. At the time of the engine failure, Annette Island Airport was closer and equipped with better facilities, but was unavailable due to poor weather conditions.

After the No. 1 engine failed, some ice formed on the forward cockpit window. The pilots flew up to 9,000 ft from 8,000 ft to avoid further ice accretion. According to Lt. Baker, the plane performed well on three engines and there were no handling difficulties.

There was light turbulence during the descent, although to Lt. Baker the approach seemed normal. The final approach was a bit high and the touchdown had little flare-out. After power was applied for the go-around, Lt. Baker felt vibrations that he associated with an impending stall. The plane impacted the water twice. The deceleration was considered rapid but not violent.

Ditching had not been anticipated and passengers had not been instructed to prepare for an abnormal landing. All or nearly all passengers evacuated the aircraft through the left cabin emergency exit, the main cabin door, and the astrodome. None of the life rafts were successfully launched. All passengers had been given emergency pamphlets upon departure from Tokyo describing life raft operations.

On June 9, 1952, divers visited the wreckage during an unusually low tide. The plane was nearly disintegrated due to tide action and corrosion. The nose gear had washed up on the beach shortly after the accident. Normally, the nose gear retracts before the main landing gear on the DC-4, but in the event of a malfunction, it can retract only partially.

Northwest Airlines noted many instances when a DC-4's nose gear failed to fully retract. All the malfunctions occurred during cold weather and during crosswind takeoffs which require nose wheel steering (as do three-engine takeoffs, like the accident aircraft's).

Maintenance records revealed that certain component parts of the No. 1 engine had exceeded their 1,500 hours between overhauls. The engine in question had been in operation for an excess of 225 hours past its overhaul due date. This oversight was due to a clerical error at Northwest Airlines.

== Findings ==
"On the basis of all available evidence, the Board finds that:

1. The company, the aircraft (with the exception of certain components of No. 1 engine), and the crew were properly certified.

2. The No. 1 engine suffered an oil loss, which necessitated shutting down the engine and feathering the propeller.

3. In accordance with company operating procedures, the captain elected to land at the first available airport, rather than continue to destination on three engines.

4. The landing at Sandspit was aborted and a go-around was started.

5. When last observed by a ground witness, the aircraft was in a shallow left bank at low altitude.

6. During the attempted climbout, the aircraft settled into the water, bounced, and came to rest 26 degrees to the left and approximately 4,500 feet from the end of the runway.

7. While all or nearly all of the passengers evacuated the aircraft with no known serious injuries, drownings and exposure accounted for 36 fatalities due to near freezing air and water temperature.

8. No steps were taken to prepare passengers for a crash landing or possible ditching.

9. Emergency lighting in the cabin was not utilized, nor were any effective measures taken to use life rafts stowed at the rear of the cabin."

== Probable cause ==
The Civil Aeronautics Board determined that "the probable cause of this accident was a nose gear retraction difficulty in connection with an icing condition or a power loss, which made the aircraft incapable of maintaining flight."

== See also ==
- List of accidents and incidents involving the Douglas DC-4
