= Pan Am Flight 923 =

1947 aviation accident

Coordinates: 55.064°N 131.391°W

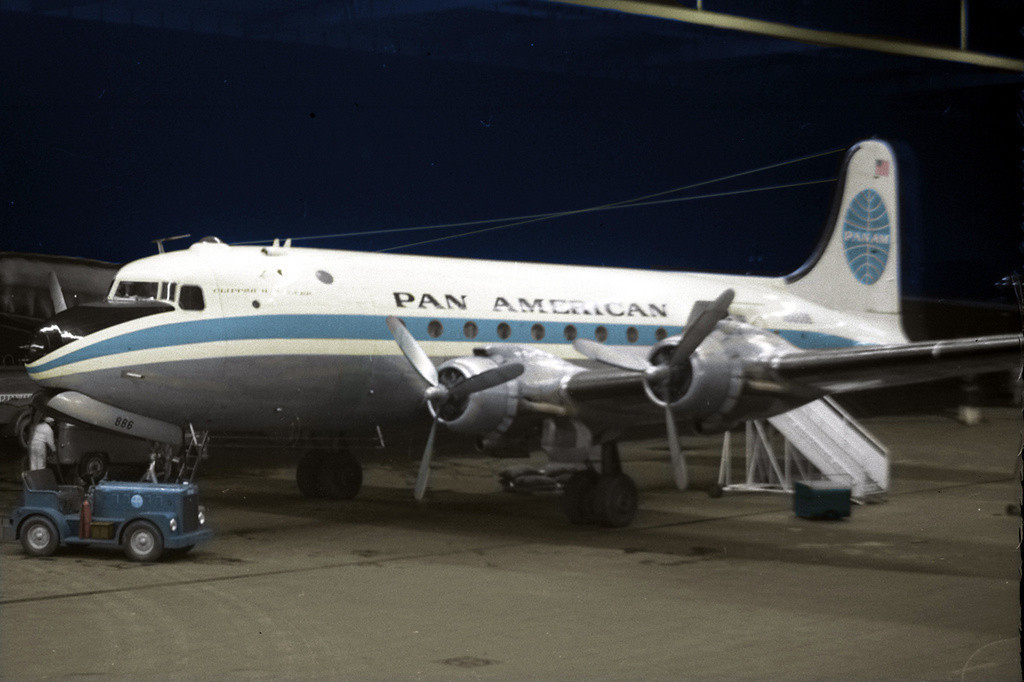
- A Pan American DC-4 similar to the one in Flight 923.

Accident
- Date: October 26, 1947
- Summary: CFIT for reasons unknown, possible Stall
- Site: Annette Island, Alaska, United States

Aircraft
- Aircraft type: Douglas DC-4
- Aircraft name: Clipper Talisman II
- Operator: Pan American World Airways
- Call sign: CLIPPER 923
- Registration: NC88920
- Flight origin: Seattle, Washington
- Stopover: Annette Island Airport, Alaska
- Destination: Juneau, Alaska
- Occupants: 18
- Passengers: 13
- Crew: 5
- Fatalities: 18
- Survivors: 0

Pan Am Flight 923 was a Douglas DC-4 operating from Seattle, Washington to Juneau, Alaska, which crashed into Tamgas Mountain on Annette Island, Alaska, on October 26, 1947. All 18 passengers and crew on board were killed.

The crash was the worst in Alaskan commercial aviation at the time, as well as the first crash of a Pan Am four-engine aircraft. An investigation by the Civil Aeronautics Board (CAB, the precursor to the NTSB) was unable to determine probable cause and it remains unknown to this day.

== Flight history ==
Flight 923 was a regularly scheduled Pan American Airways flight between Seattle and Juneau, with a scheduled stopover at Annette Island Airport. The aircraft left Seattle at 10:30 A.M. on October 26, 1947. It was scheduled to arrive in Juneau around 3:00 P.M. that same day.

There were five Pan Am crew members aboard: three cockpit crew and two pursers. The pilot was Captain Alf N. Monsen, a veteran pilot with 13,565 hours of flying time. His copilot was First Officer Laurence A. Foster, another captain who was serving as copilot and first officer due to personnel reductions at Pan Am. The flight engineer was C. L. Dunwoody.

The aircraft for the flight was a Douglas DC-4, a four-engine propliner, registration NC88920, and had been in service since 1944, accumulating 4,146 hours of flying time. Maintenance records obtained by the CAB after the crash indicated that the airplane was in good working condition, with no reported mechanical failures or issues.

The aircraft departed Seattle on schedule at 10:30 A.M.. There were 13 passengers aboard, along with 822 pounds (373 kg) of cargo and 2,500 US gallons (9,500 L) of fuel. The aircraft was well within weight and load limits, and was only carrying a quarter of its usual capacity of 44 passengers. Prior to departure, Captain Monsen received a weather report from Pan American's meteorologist, which indicated that a cold front would be passing through Annette Island prior to the flight's arrival.

The first leg of the journey was uneventful, up until the aircraft reached the radio range station near the Annette airport. The radio range station was located 1.5 miles (2.4 km) northwest of the airport. Air Traffic Control cleared the flight to pass over the range station at 7,000 feet and then to proceed with a normal landing. Captain Monsen acknowledged the clearance at 1:38 PM and reported his position over the range station at 7,000 feet.

Five minutes later, at 1:43, the Captain radioed Annette control tower and aborted his approach. He reported extreme turbulence at lower elevations, and indicated that he would instead continue to Juneau without landing at Annette. This was the last radio contact made with the aircraft. After Captain Monsen had radioed his intent to Juneau, the control tower radioed an acknowledgement and asked for Flight 923's altitude. When the control tower was unable to reestablish radio communications, the station issued an alert that Flight 923 had gone missing. The alert was issued at 2:01 P.M..

== Search and recovery ==
Initial search and rescue operations were hampered by severe weather and the arrival of the cold front forecasted by the Pan Am meteorologist. Further complicating search efforts was the fact that the DC-4 was carrying enough fuel for it to return to Seattle. One newspaper reported Pan American officials as stating that the aircraft was carrying enough fuel to continue flying until 8:40 P.M. Initial search operations were undertaken by the United States Coast Guard as well as the Army Air Force's Alaska command. The army sent B-17s and a C-47 to aid in the search. However snow, fog, heavy winds of 45 to 50 miles per hour (72 to 80 km/h), and severe icing conditions around the airport limited the abilities of searchers and completely hid the crash scene from view.

Search teams from the Coast Guard located the scene of the crash at 8:45 A.M. (PST) on October 31, five days after the plane had disappeared. The wreckage lay on the north face of Tamgas mountain, a 3,591-foot (1,095 m) peak approximately 6 miles (9.7 km) east of the Annette Island air field. The DC-4 had flown into the mountain approximately 200 feet (61 m) below the summit. Initial reports indicated that the tail section of the plane was clearly visible on the mountain side.

The CAB team sent on site to investigate, determined that the wreckage was buried under significant snowfall on a part of the mountain that was difficult to access by foot. The CAB determined that they would be unable to continue with the investigation until the snow melted. Instead, the Coast Guard members and CAB employees retrieved the bodies of the victims from the scene, a process which took several days due to ongoing foul weather.

== Investigation ==
Pan Am Flight 923 was the first crash of a Pan American four-engined aircraft. At the time of the crash, it was also the deadliest crash in Alaskan commercial aviation. It was the 31st worst accident at the time, in terms of loss of life, and remains the 195th worst accident as of November 2013.

The Civil Aeronautics Board began its investigation at 2:30 P.M. on October 26, 1947, less than an hour after the last known communication with Flight 923. Once the wreckage was located, investigators flew a seaplane to a lake near the foot of Tamgas mountain and accompanied Coast Guard members up to the crash site. The wreckage of the plane was scattered over an area of 20,000 square feet (1,900 m^{2}) at a position 196 feet (60 m) below the summit of the mountain. When investigators reached the scene, it was snowing heavily and it was determined that the investigation could not continue until the snow had melted in the summer thaw. The investigation therefore resumed in late August 1948, the time of maximum thaw on the mountain.

Investigators were able to gather little from the wreckage, most of which was severely damaged by the crash and the subsequent flash fire. The only instrument with readable settings which could be salvaged was the fluxgate compass, which was used to confirm the aircraft's heading. Propeller marks on the cliff face also confirmed the aircraft's heading and indicated that the aircraft was pitched nose upwards as it tried to climb. The propellers themselves were broken in such a fashion to indicate that they were functioning normally at impact. It was impossible to determine, however, the aircraft's speed at the time of the crash due to a lack of surviving instruments. Investigators were also able to determine that all of the damage to the plane was incurred during or after the crash; there was no indication of a midair mechanical failure.

=== Incorrect charts ===
Initial newspaper reports indicated that the height of Tamgas Mountain was misrepresented on aviation charts. These charts indicated that the mountain was 3,610 feet (1,100 m) tall. Reporters who toured the crash site from aircraft reported that the mountain was in fact significantly taller, and estimated the true height of the peak to be between 4,000 and 4,100 feet (1,200 and 1,200 m) tall. The position of the aircraft, and its bearing to the south when the pilot had declared his intention to divert to Juneau in the north, led to speculation that the pilot had attempted to return to Seattle and had crashed into the mountain due to faulty charts.

According to the CAB investigation report, both the Pan Am aviation charts as well as the standard United States Coast and Geodetic Survey charts indicated the height of Tamgas mountain as 3,610 feet (1,100 m). Following the crash, the exact height of the mountain was recalculated and new charts were issued with the corrected height of the mountain: 3,595 feet (1,096 m). As the actual height of the mountain was in fact 14 feet (4.3 m) lower than the height indicated on the charts, the discrepancy in elevation was not considered to be a contributing factor in the crash.

=== Foul weather ===
The weather report issued to Captain Morsen prior to the flight indicated weather conditions that were significantly different from those he actually encountered when approaching Annette Island. The Pan American Airways meteorologist had forecast that the cold front would reach Annette Island prior to the flight's arrival, and that conditions would be light rain, gusty, and overcast. This forecast actually contradicted what the US and Canadian Weather Bureaus were forecasting at the time. Pan American's meteorologist revised his forecast at 12:39 PM, but there was no indication that Flight 923 received the information. The updated forecast called for the cold front to reach Annette Island at 4:00 PM PST, but still made no mention of turbulence.

The CAB, upon reviewing available weather data, determined that the Pan Am meteorologist should have been able to predict, with some amount of certainty, that there would be severe turbulence at lower altitude and high winds. This data would have been available for the meteorologist to make such a prediction prior to or shortly after Flight 923's departure from Seattle. Such a forecast would have warned the crew of the weather conditions they encountered when they decided to abort their landing at Annette Island airport.

23 minutes prior to Flight 923's aborted landing at Annette Island, an Army Air Force pilot flying from Tacoma, Washington, landed at Annette Island airport. He reported to investigators that he encountered heavy turbulence at lower altitude that grew more severe as he descended from 6,000 to 450 feet (1,830 to 140 m). Three hours after Flight 923's disappearance, another passenger aircraft landed at Annette Field, this one from Whitehorse, Canada.

The pilot reported icing between 9,000 and 7,000 feet (2,700 and 2,100 m) and turbulence below 6,000 feet (1,800 m) that was so severe it nearly tumbled the gyro flight instruments. Six hours after Flight 923's disappearance, the Army Air Force pilot attempted to depart Annette Island, but encountered icing so severe he was forced to return to the air field.

Investigators were able to conclude that there was significant foul weather and severe turbulence in the area at the time Flight 923 was attempting to land at Annette Island. Furthermore, the incorrect weather report by the Pan Am meteorologist left the pilot unaware of the turbulence and high winds he would encounter on approach. The CAB postulated that severe turbulence or severe icing may have caused the pilot to lose control of the aircraft. However this could not be declared the definitive cause of the accident due to insufficient evidence.

=== Probable cause ===
Given the lack of communication, witnesses, and evidence, the Civil Aeronautics Board was unable to determine a probable cause for the crash of Flight 923. While the investigation was able to determine a number of factors which may have contributed to the crash, there did not exist enough evidence to determine a definitive cause. To that end, the official statement of probable cause in the Accident Investigation Report reads:

The board finds that there is not sufficient evidence to determine the probable cause of this accident.

— Civil Aeronautics Board, Accident Investigation Report, Docket #SA-155, File #1-0099-47. Released March 21, 1949.

== See also ==
- List of accidents and incidents involving the Douglas DC-4
