= Alliford Bay =

Bay in British Columbia

Alliford Bay, British Columbia Kwuna
- Village
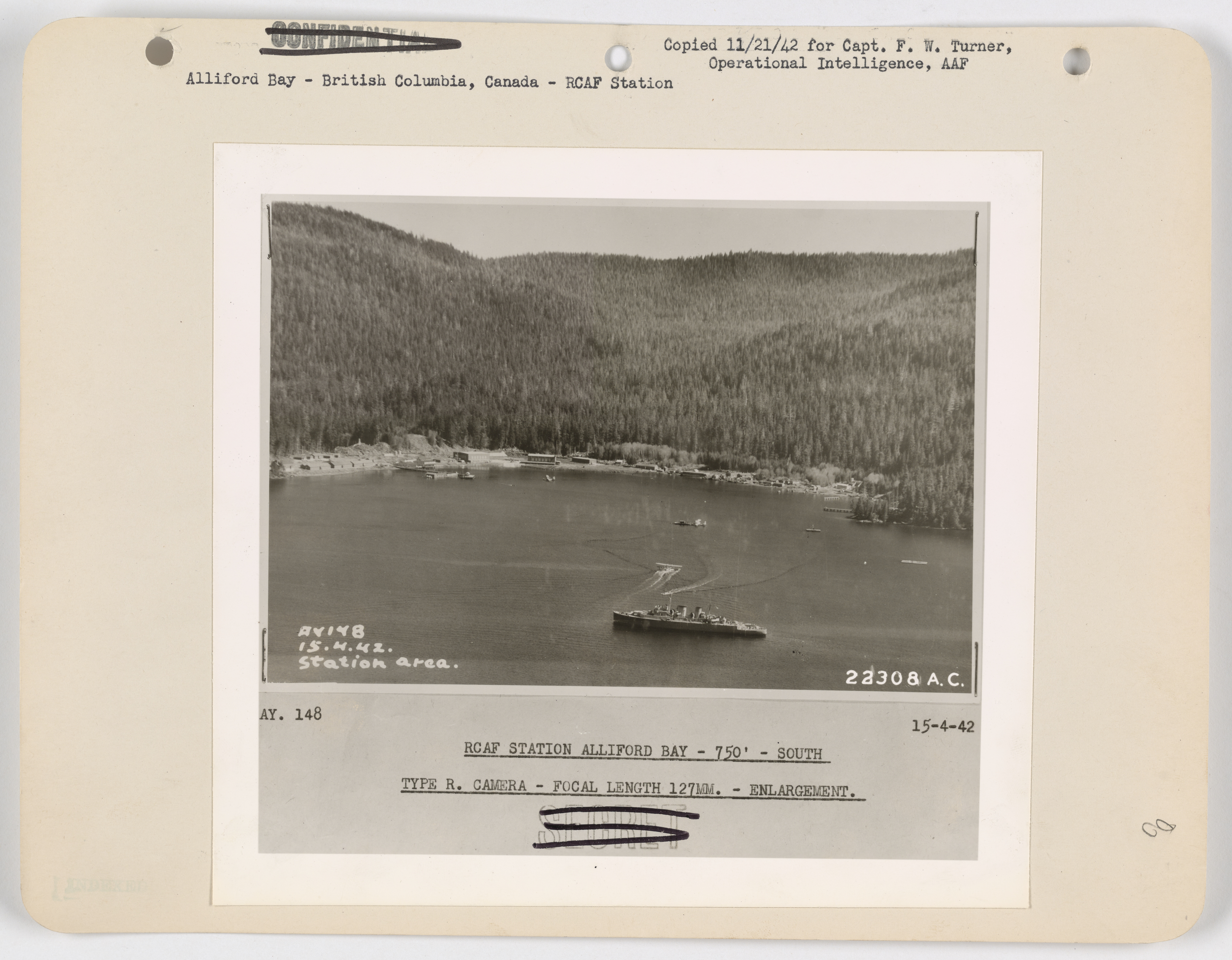
- Alliford Bay RCAF base

- Location within British Columbia Location within Canada
- Country: Canada
- Province: British Columbia

Alliford Bay is a bay, and was the location of a town, on Moresby Island on Haida Gwaii. It is 15 kilometers west of Sandspit and is now a terminus for BC Ferries and North Pacific Seaplanes.

During the Second World War, the Royal Canadian Air Force flew the PBY-5 Catalina in and out of the air force base located at Alliford Bay. From 1941 to 1943, the RCAF placed its High Frequency Directing capabilities at the disposal of the Royal Canadian Navy. The station played a role in the RCN's radio intelligence operations against the Japanese. It was shut down in 1945.

Today all that is left of the base is a red cedar mill and a dry land sort. Several inhabited homes are still at Alliford Bay.

== Gallery ==
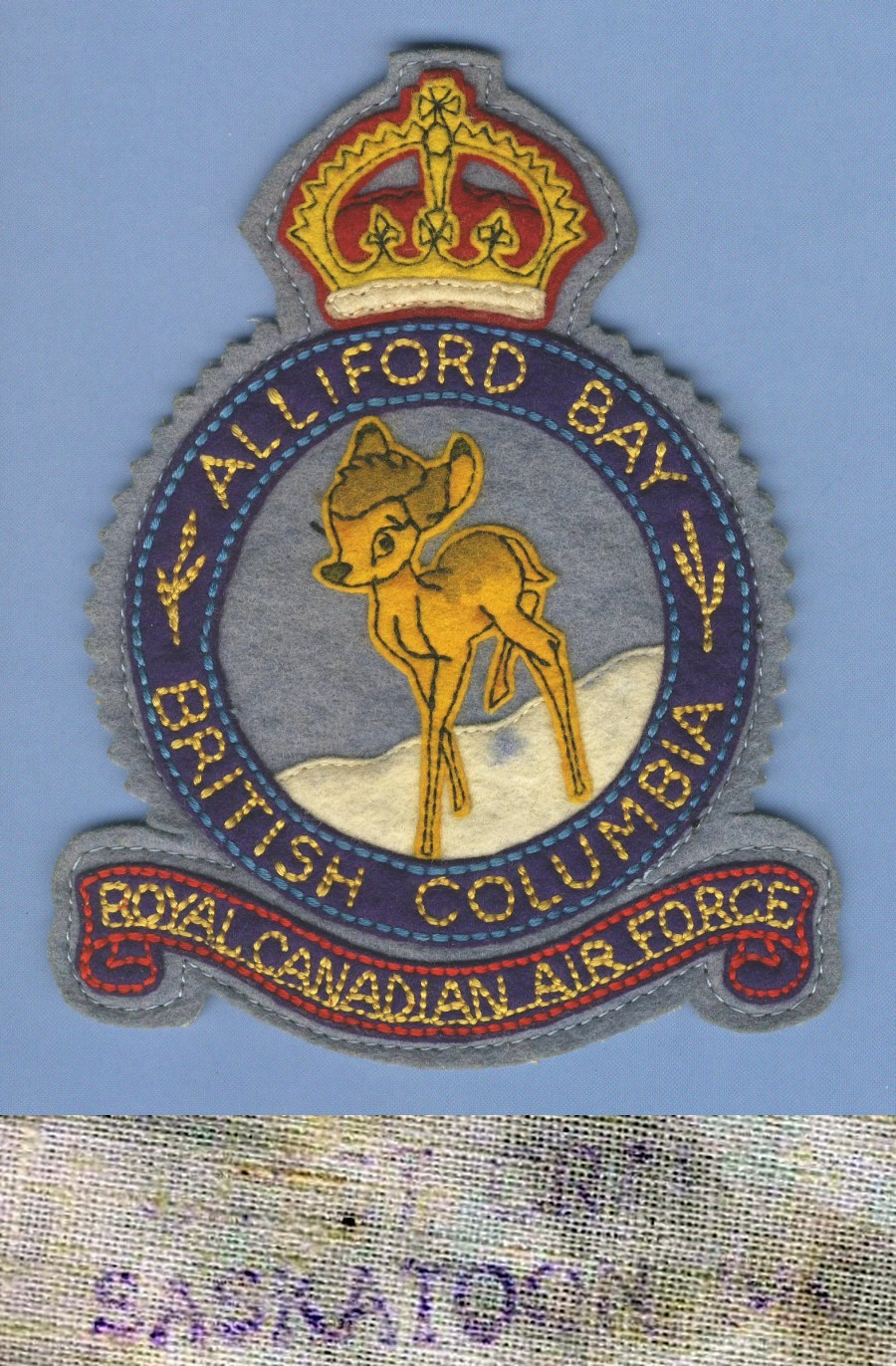
A World War II jacket patch for Alliford Bay, British Columbia

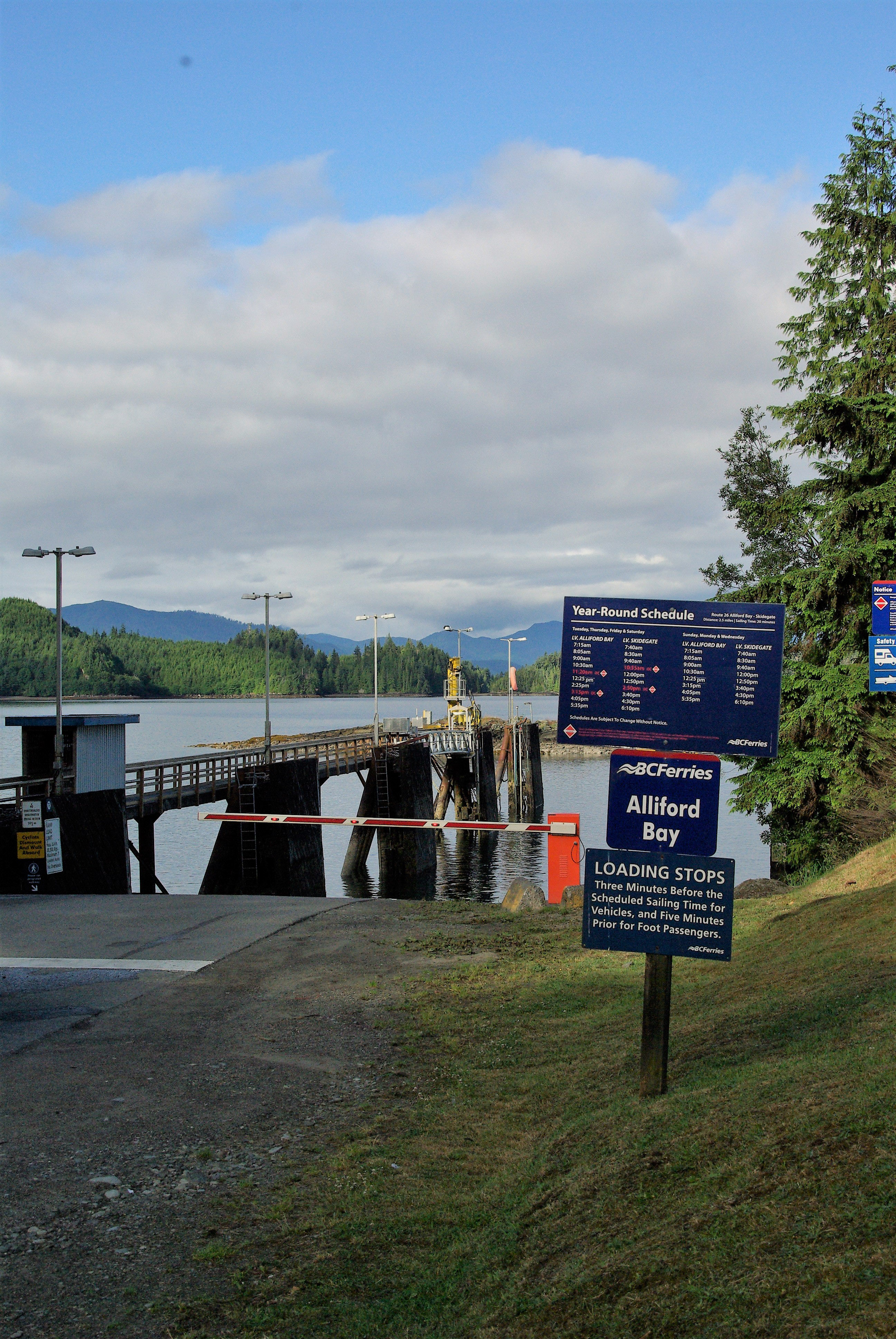
Alliford Bay ferry terminal, Sandspit
