= 1950 Douglas C-54D disappearance =

Aircraft disappearance

1950 Douglas C-54D-1-DC disappearance
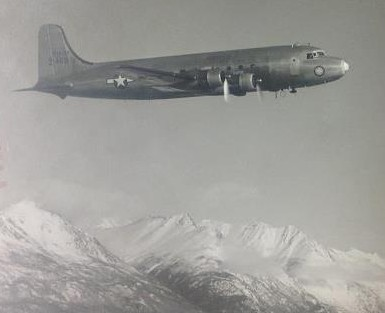
- 42-72469, the aircraft involved, seen in 1946

Incident
- Date: 26 January 1950
- Summary: Disappearance
- Site: Yukon, Canada; in vicinity of Snag

Aircraft
- Aircraft type: Douglas C-54 Skymaster
- Operator: United States Air Force
- Registration: 42-72469
- Flight origin: Elmendorf Air Force Base (EDF) (EDF/PAED), Anchorage, Alaska, USA
- Destination: Great Falls Air Force Base (GFA) (GFA/KGFA), Montana, USA
- Occupants: 44
- Passengers: 36
- Crew: 8
- Missing: 44
- Survivors: 0

On 26 January 1950, the Douglas C-54 Skymaster serial number 42-72469 disappeared en route from Alaska to Montana, with 44 people aboard. The aircraft made its last radio contact two hours into its eight-hour flight. Despite one of the largest rescue efforts carried out by a joint effort between Canadian and US military forces, as of 2026, no trace of the aircraft has been found.

== Flight ==
The aircraft was part of the First Strategic Support Squadron, Strategic Air Command, out of Biggs AFB, Texas. In addition to its eight-man crew, it was carrying 36 passengers, including two civilians: a woman and her infant son. An earlier attempt to depart had been made, but due to trouble with one of its four engines, it was delayed several hours. The flight was from Anchorage, Alaska, to Great Falls, Montana. Two hours after its eventual departure, the flight marked its first scheduled check-in over Snag, Yukon, where the pilot reported that the plane was on schedule with no issues to report except for ice on the wings. However, the flight never checked in with its second destination, Aishihik, Yukon, and was never heard from again.

== Search ==
Location map

After the plane failed to arrive in Montana, a search-and-rescue effort launched, combining as many as 85 American and Canadian planes, in addition to 7,000 personnel, searching 350,000 square miles (910,000 km^{2}) of the Pacific Northwest. The search was aided by the fact that soldiers and equipment had already been ferried north for the upcoming Exercise Sweetbriar, a joint Canada–U.S. war games scenario.

The operation confounded searchers, giving many false positive reports of smoke signals and garbled radio communications. Search efforts were hindered by the lack of pilot training in search-and-rescue tactics; defined search patterns were not used, for example.

Three planes crashed during the search mission; although all crew survived, the incidents reflected the dangers of the Yukon terrain:

- On 30 January, a C-47, Air Force serial number 45-1015 from the 57th Fighter Wing, that had been participating in the search, stalled and crashed in the McClintoc mountains near Whitehorse. Its crew members were injured, but there were no fatalities. The pilot walked 13 km to the Alaska Highway and flagged down a truck to call in support for his 5–8 crewmates.
- On 7 February, a C-47D, 45-1037, from Eielson Air Force Base employed on the search by the 5010th Wing, crashed on a mountain slope south of Aishihik Lake. There were ten crew members on board, but there were no fatalities.
- On 16 February, a Royal Canadian Air Force C-47, KJ-936, crashed near Snag. Again, its four crew members sustained only light injuries. Later its wreckage would be temporarily mistaken for the missing C-54.

On 2 February it was reported that two planes and two radio stations in the Yukon area had heard unintelligible radio signals, including some near the plane's failed second check-in town of Aishihik, but attempts to acquire a source were fruitless. Likewise, an isolated settler had reported seeing a large plane over his cabin at Beaver Lake in the interior of British Columbia located 500 miles (800 km) south of the Yukon boundary-250 miles (400 km) northeast of Vancouver and 200 miles (320 km) west of the Alaska Highway air route.

The operation was indefinitely suspended on 14 February, as the search planes were sent to the Gulf of Alaska to search for a missing B-36 bomber which had been carrying a Mark 4 nuclear bomb, though this bomb did not have a radioactive core. (The B-36 wreckage was subsequently located.)

== Aftermath ==
On 20 February 1950, the search was officially cancelled and notifications were sent to next of kin informing them that the passengers were presumed dead.

In 2012, the descendants of the missing servicemen started a petition to the Federal government, through the We the People petition system, seeking to resurrect the search for their families' remains.

In 2020, Andrew Gregg was named as the director of an upcoming documentary about the search for the aircraft, Skymaster Down. The documentary was aired in Canada on 16 January 2022, on the CBC's Documentary Channel.

In 2022, after the documentary's release, a group in Whitehorse, consisting of a geologist, a historian and a glaciologist, among others, formed to conduct a renewed search for the missing aircraft, using drones to explore inaccessible locations.

== See also ==
- List of missing aircraft
- List of accidents and incidents involving the Douglas DC-4
