= 1960 Cochabamba Douglas DC-4 crash =

Aircraft accident in Bolivia

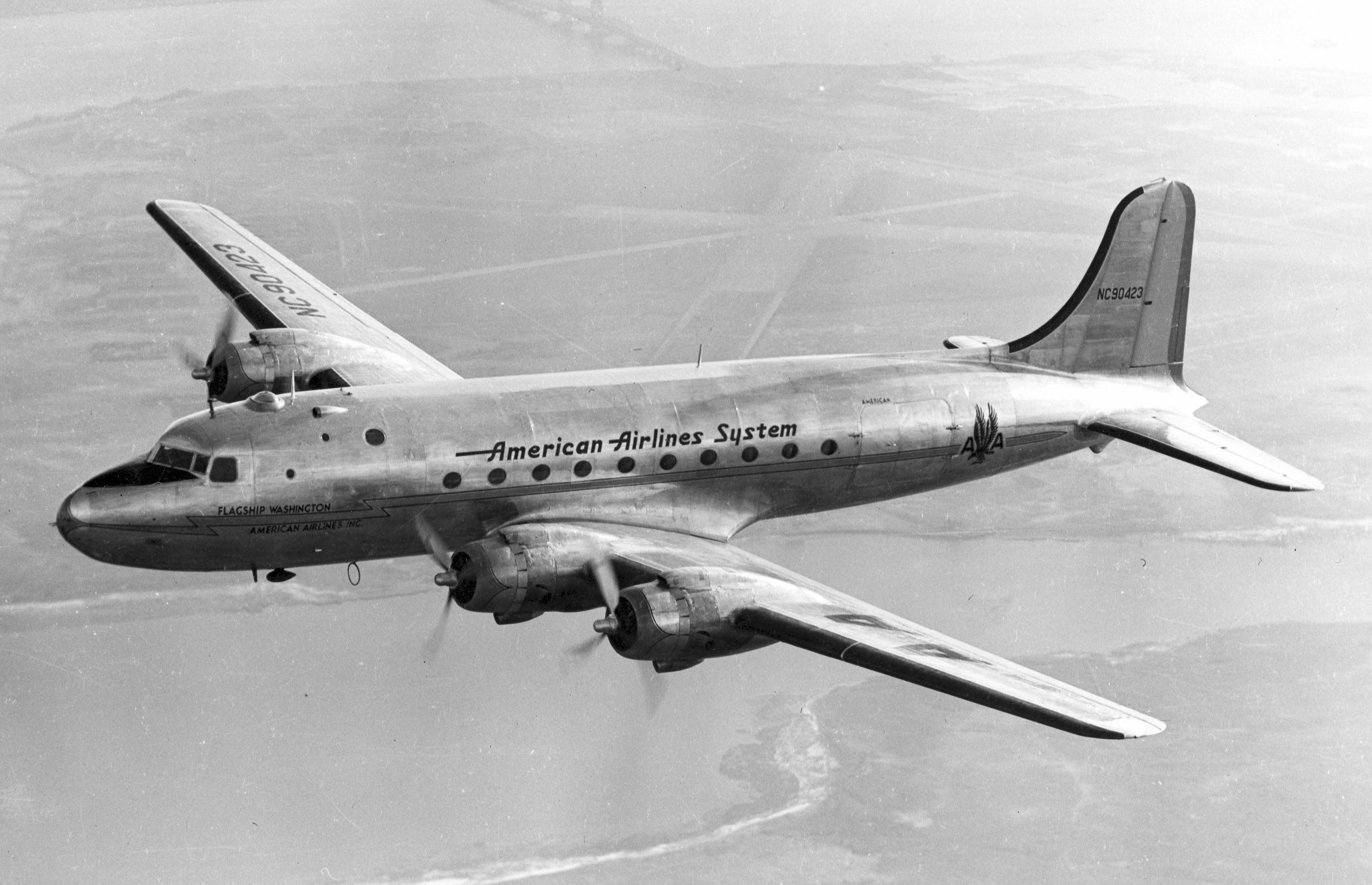
- A Douglas DC-4, similar to the accident aircraft

Accident
- Date: 5 February 1960
- Summary: Crashed shortly after take-off
- Site: Near Cochabamba, Bolivia

Aircraft
- Aircraft type: Douglas DC-4
- Operator: Lloyd Aéreo Boliviano
- Registration: CP-609
- Flight origin: Jorge Wilstermann International Airport, Cochabamba, Bolivia
- Destination: El Alto Airport, La Paz, Bolivia
- Occupants: 59
- Passengers: 55
- Crew: 4
- Fatalities: 59
- Survivors: 0

On 5 February 1960, a Douglas DC-4 passenger aircraft of Lloyd Aéreo Boliviano on a domestic flight from Cochabamba to La Paz, Bolivia, crashed shortly after take-off. All 59 people on board were killed.

== Incident ==
Five minutes after taking off from Cochabamba's Jorge Wilstermann Airport, one of the plane's four engines reportedly caught fire. The aircraft subsequently crashed into a lagoon in the Andes, some 20 miles from the city of Cochabamba. It was the worst aviation accident in Bolivia's history at the time. The pilot, 30-year-old Joaquin Lobos, was one of the airline's most experienced aviators, especially over the mountains of Bolivia.

== Passengers ==
Out of the 59 onboard, one child survived the initial crash, but died due to their injuries while being taken to a hospital by rescuers. Among the passengers were four families.

== Aftermath ==
The airline canceled all flights the day of the crash for mourning. The accident was blamed on a technical defect.
