= Golfo de los Mosquitos =

Gulf on the north coast of Panama

- Mosquito Gulf
- Location within Panama
- Coordinates: 8.85500°N 81.36500°W
- Type: Gulf

Golfo de los Mosquitos, also called Mosquito Gulf, is a gulf of the Caribbean Sea on the north coast of Panama, extending from the Valiente Peninsula in Bocas del Toro Province, past the north coast of Veraguas to the Colón Province.

Historically this term included the Mosquito Coast which is further north in Nicaragua and Honduras, but in modern usage it refers only to the gulf off the coast of the Panamanian provinces of Bocas del Toro, Veraguas and Colón.

The Isla Escudo de Veraguas is the primary island in the gulf.

The Golfo de los Mosquitos forests are the largest block of lowland forest on the Caribbean slope between Bocas del Toro and the San Blas Islands. The area is home to the entire population of the Geminis' dart frog and was identified as a Key Biodiversity Area in 2003. It is threatened by development for cattle and subsistence agriculture, as well as the discovery of a nearby copper deposit.

== See also ==
- 2023 Panamanian protests
