= 1967 Air Algérie DC-4 crash =

Aviation incident in Algeria

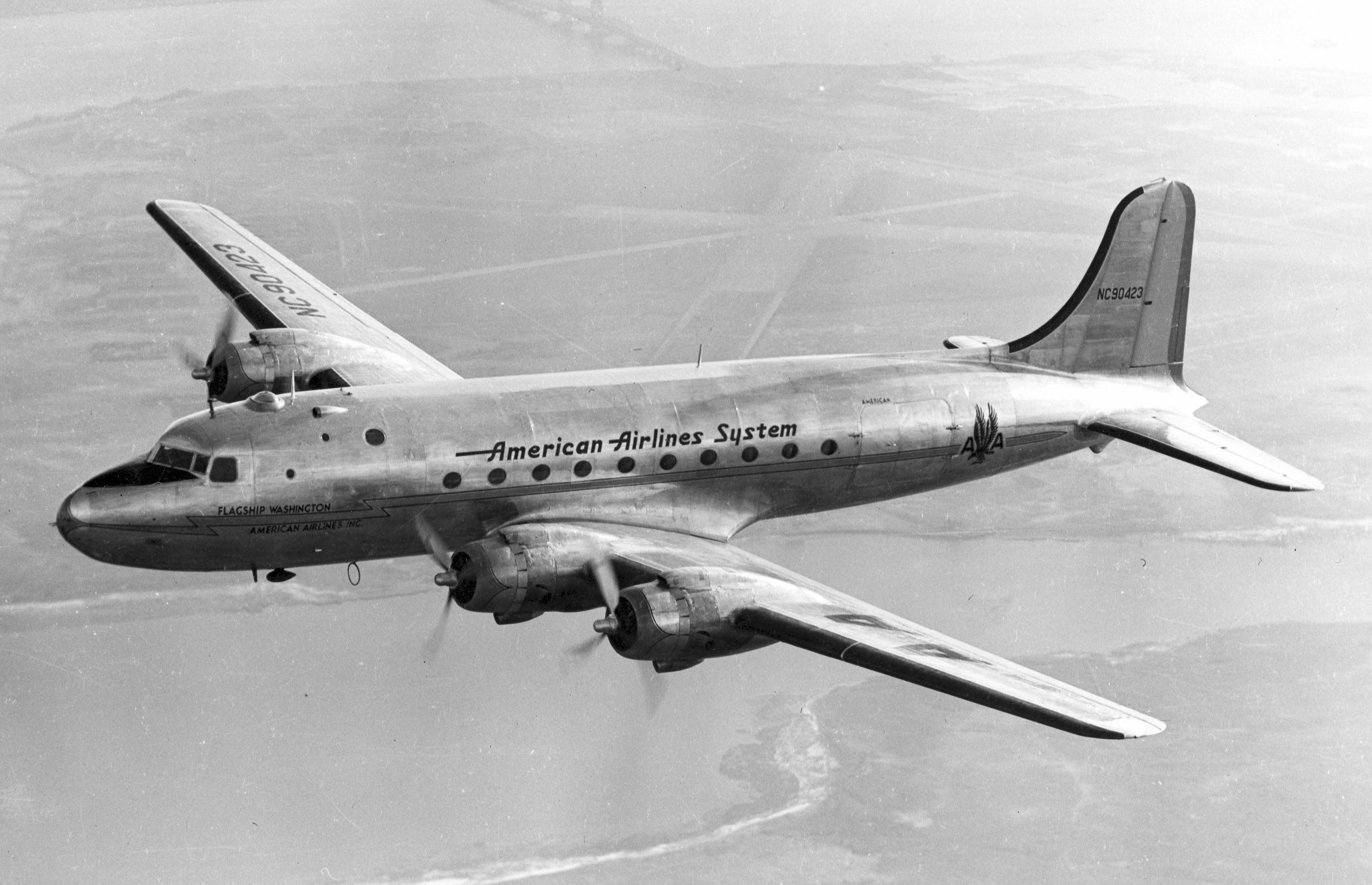
- A Douglas DC-4, similar to the accident aircraft

Accident
- Date: 11 April 1967
- Summary: Controlled flight into terrain
- Site: Tamanrasset, Algeria

Aircraft
- Aircraft type: Douglas DC-4
- Operator: Air Algérie
- Registration: 7T-VAU
- Flight origin: Algiers-Dar el Beida Airport, Algiers, Algeria
- 1st stopover: Ghardaïa Airport, Ghardaïa, Algeria
- 2nd stopover: Oued Irara–Krim Belkacem Airport, Hassi Messaoud, Algeria
- 3rd stopover: In Amenas Airport, In Amenas, Algeria
- Last stopover: Djanet Inedbirene Airport, Djanet, Algeria
- Destination: Tamanrasset Airport, Tamanrasset, Algeria
- Occupants: 39
- Passengers: 33
- Crew: 6
- Fatalities: 35
- Injuries: 4
- Survivors: 4

On 11 April 1967, a DC-4 was flying a domestic flight from Algiers to Tamanrasset with stops in Ghardaïa, Hassi Messaoud, In Amenas and Djanet, all in Algeria. When the aircraft was on approach to Tamanrasset, it descended too low and struck a mountain, killing all but 4 of the 39 people on board.

== Aircraft ==
7T-VAU was a Douglas DC-4 that first flew in 1943. It was powered by 4 piston engines.

== Flight ==
On the night approach to Tamanrasset the plane descended too low and struck a mountainside, 300 meters below the summit. The impact forces and the ensuing fire killed 35 of the 39 people on board and severely injured the 4 survivors (2 Algerians, 2 Swiss).
