= Sandspit, British Columbia =

Community in British Columbia, Canada

Sandspit K'il Kun
- Unincorporated community
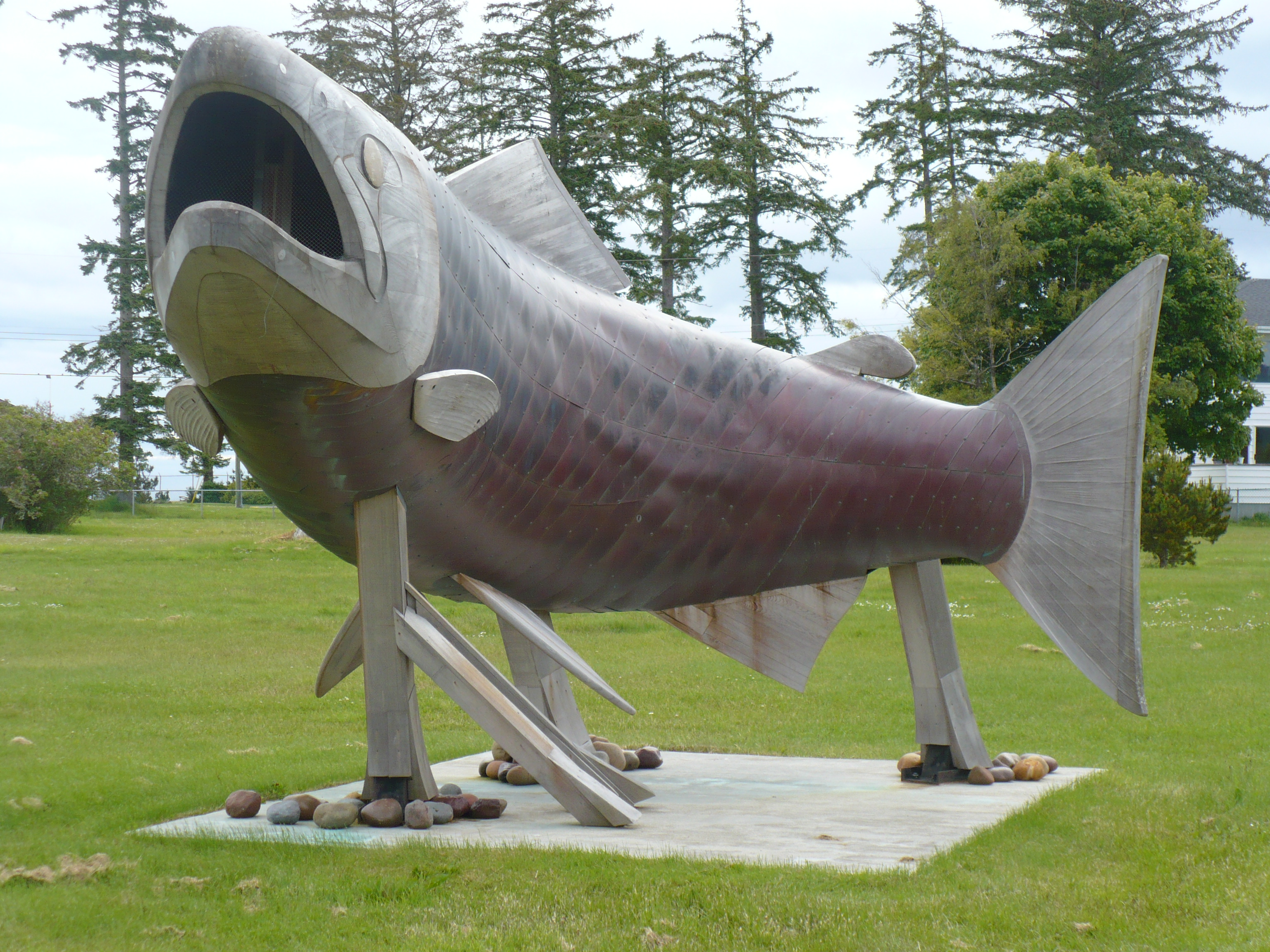
- The "Spirit of Sandspit"

- Location of Sandspit Sandspit (Canada) Sandspit (North America)
- Coordinates: 53°15′N 131°49′W
- Country: Canada
- Province: British Columbia
- Region: Haida Gwaii
- Regional district: North Coast

Area (2021)
  - Land: 5.85 km^{2} (2.26 sq mi)
- Elevation: 6 m (20 ft)

Population (2021)
  - Total: 310
  - Density: 53/km^{2} (140/sq mi)
- Time zone: UTC−07:00 (MST)
- Forward sortation area: V0T
- Area codes: 250, 778, 236

Sandspit (Haida: K'il Kun) is the largest community on Moresby Island, in Haida Gwaii off the Pacific coast of British Columbia, Canada. The only town on Moresby Island, Sandspit has accommodations, a campground, supermarket and 85-berth harbour serving visitors to Gwaii Haanas National Park Reserve and Haida Heritage Site.

The unincorporated community had a population of 310 as of the 2021 census, up from 296 at the 2016 census. The community is served by Sandspit Airport with daily flights to and from Vancouver, as well as multiple ferry voyages from Alliford Bay to Skidegate Landing on Graham Island.

Near the airport is the "Spirit of Sandspit", a copper and cedar sculpture of a salmon by island artist Lon Sharp, which dominates the main road. Sandspit is also home to the Open Ocean totem pole by Jesse Jones, Jimmy Jones and Jason Goetzinger.

The Circle Tour leaves and returns to Sandspit on an active gravel logging road past Skidegate Lake, Copper River, Gray Bay beach, and Copper Bay, where Haida people, continuing tradition, fish for sockeye salmon and hang the fish out to dry in May and early June to preserve it.

== Climate ==
Sandspit experiences an oceanic (Köppen Cfb) with a rainy season in the colder months, typical for the Pacific Northwest. It is very warm for its high latitude in North America, and its annual average temperature is the same as Port Hardy, which is located almost 3 degrees further south.

Climate data for Sandspit (Sandspit Airport) Climate ID: 1057050; coordinates 53°15′14″N 131°48′47″W; elevation: 6.4 m (21 ft); 1991–2020 normals, extremes 1945−present (Note: Composite station metadata: Sandspit Airport AUTO; Climate ID: 1057051; WMO ID: 71101; coordinates 53°14′58″N 131°48′47″W; 6.5 m (21 ft): Sandspit; Climate ID: 1057052; WMO ID: 71111; coordinates 53°15′15″N 131°48′50″W; 6.4 m (21 ft): Sandspit AWOS; Climate ID: 1057055; coordinates 53°15′15″N 131°48′50″W; 6.4 m (21 ft))
Month	Jan	Feb	Mar	Apr	May	Jun	Jul	Aug	Sep	Oct	Nov	Dec	Year
Record high humidex	14.3	13.3	13.8	15.4	23.0	27.1	30.8	30.2	26.4	22.0	17.6	16.6	30.8
Record high °C (°F)	13.3 (55.9)	13.4 (56.1)	14.1 (57.4)	18.9 (66.0)	21.7 (71.1)	26.7 (80.1)	27.8 (82.0)	26.7 (80.1)	24.1 (75.4)	20.6 (69.1)	16.3 (61.3)	13.4 (56.1)	27.8 (82.0)
Mean daily maximum °C (°F)	6.5 (43.7)	6.6 (43.9)	7.4 (45.3)	9.7 (49.5)	12.5 (54.5)	15.0 (59.0)	17.4 (63.3)	18.2 (64.8)	16.1 (61.0)	12.3 (54.1)	8.7 (47.7)	6.7 (44.1)	11.4 (52.5)
Daily mean °C (°F)	4.1 (39.4)	4.2 (39.6)	4.5 (40.1)	6.7 (44.1)	9.7 (49.5)	12.3 (54.1)	14.7 (58.5)	15.3 (59.5)	13.2 (55.8)	9.5 (49.1)	6.1 (43.0)	4.3 (39.7)	8.7 (47.7)
Mean daily minimum °C (°F)	1.8 (35.2)	1.7 (35.1)	1.6 (34.9)	3.7 (38.7)	6.8 (44.2)	9.5 (49.1)	11.9 (53.4)	12.4 (54.3)	10.3 (50.5)	6.7 (44.1)	3.5 (38.3)	1.8 (35.2)	6.0 (42.8)
Record low °C (°F)	−13.9 (7.0)	−12.3 (9.9)	−12.2 (10.0)	−5.1 (22.8)	−1.1 (30.0)	2.2 (36.0)	5.0 (41.0)	1.9 (35.4)	−0.6 (30.9)	−3.1 (26.4)	−15.5 (4.1)	−12.8 (9.0)	−15.5 (4.1)
Record low wind chill	−22.9	−24.1	−22.9	−10.8	−3.4	0.0	0.0	0.0	0.0	−10.7	−26.0	−20.8	−26.0
Average precipitation mm (inches)	166.9 (6.57)	118.1 (4.65)	118.1 (4.65)	94.2 (3.71)	54.2 (2.13)	49.3 (1.94)	48.6 (1.91)	57.6 (2.27)	78.3 (3.08)	164.2 (6.46)	175.3 (6.90)	197.2 (7.76)	1,322.1 (52.05)
Average rainfall mm (inches)	157.9 (6.22)	120.9 (4.76)	116.5 (4.59)	93.0 (3.66)	57.6 (2.27)	48.3 (1.90)	48.0 (1.89)	60.1 (2.37)	78.9 (3.11)	166.7 (6.56)	180.8 (7.12)	193.4 (7.61)	1,322.1 (52.05)
Average snowfall cm (inches)	12.0 (4.7)	3.5 (1.4)	6.5 (2.6)	0.4 (0.2)	0.0 (0.0)	0.0 (0.0)	0.0 (0.0)	0.0 (0.0)	0.0 (0.0)	0.0 (0.0)	1.6 (0.6)	5.0 (2.0)	28.9 (11.4)
Average precipitation days (≥ 0.2 mm)	22.2	18.7	22.1	20.7	16.0	14.8	15.1	13.9	17.2	22.3	23.3	25.1	231.3
Average rainy days (≥ 0.2 mm)	21.1	17.8	21.1	20.2	16.2	14.8	15.0	14.4	17.3	22.6	23.2	24.0	227.6
Average snowy days (≥ 0.2 cm)	2.6	1.6	2.1	0.45	0.0	0.0	0.0	0.0	0.0	0.0	0.87	1.6	9.1
Average relative humidity (%) (at 1500 LST)	84.8	79.1	75.9	76.2	75.4	76.9	76.6	76.5	77.4	79.1	82.2	84.6	78.7
Average dew point °C (°F)	0.6 (33.1)	1.8 (35.2)	1.7 (35.1)	3.6 (38.5)	6.2 (43.2)	8.8 (47.8)	11.1 (52.0)	11.9 (53.4)	10.5 (50.9)	7.2 (45.0)	3.9 (39.0)	1.9 (35.4)	5.8 (42.4)
Mean monthly sunshine hours	48.6	78.1	118.1	154.6	199.1	176.8	186.6	186.8	141.8	97.9	63	47	1,498.1
Percentage possible sunshine	19.3	28.2	32.2	36.9	40.5	34.9	36.7	40.8	37.1	29.7	24.1	19.9	31.7
Source: Environment and Climate Change Canada (sunshine 1971–2000) (dew point at 1300 LST, 1951–1980)

== Demographics ==
In the 2021 Canadian census conducted by Statistics Canada, Sandspit had a population of 310 living in 156 of its 243 total private dwellings, a change of 4.7% from its 2016 population of 296. With a land area of 5.85 km^{2} (2.26 sq mi), it had a population density of 53.0/km^{2} (137.2/sq mi) in 2021.
