= List of WestJet destinations =

The following is a list of destinations currently served by WestJet and WestJet Encore.

== WestJet destinations ==
Country	City	Airport	Notes	Refs
Antigua and Barbuda	St. John's	V. C. Bird International Airport		
Aruba	Oranjestad	Queen Beatrix International Airport		
Bahamas	Freeport	Grand Bahama International Airport		
Bahamas	Nassau	Lynden Pindling International Airport		
Barbados	Bridgetown	Grantley Adams International Airport		
Belize	Belize City	Philip S. W. Goldson International Airport	Seasonal	
Bonaire	Kralendijk	Flamingo International Airport	Seasonal	
Brazil	São Paulo	São Paulo/Guarulhos International Airport	Begins November 8, 2026	
Canada (Alberta)	Calgary	Calgary International Airport	Hub	
Canada (Alberta)	Edmonton	Edmonton International Airport	Focus city	
Canada (British Columbia)	Abbotsford	Abbotsford International Airport		
Canada (British Columbia)	Comox	Comox Valley Airport		
Canada (British Columbia)	Kelowna	Kelowna International Airport		
Canada (British Columbia)	Vancouver	Vancouver International Airport	Focus city	
Canada (British Columbia)	Victoria	Victoria International Airport		
Canada (Manitoba)	Winnipeg	Winnipeg James Armstrong Richardson International Airport	Focus city	
Canada (New Brunswick)	Fredericton	Fredericton International Airport	Seasonal	
Canada (New Brunswick)	Moncton	Greater Moncton Roméo LeBlanc International Airport		
Canada (Newfoundland and Labrador)	Deer Lake/ Corner Brook	Deer Lake Regional Airport	Seasonal	
Canada (Newfoundland and Labrador)	St. John's	St. John's International Airport		
Canada (Nova Scotia)	Halifax	Halifax Stanfield International Airport		
Canada (Nova Scotia)	Cape Breton Regional Municipality	Sydney/J.A. Douglas McCurdy Airport	Seasonal	
Canada (Ontario)	Hamilton	John C. Munro Hamilton International Airport		
Canada (Ontario)	Kitchener/Waterloo	Region of Waterloo International Airport		
Canada (Ontario)	London	London International Airport		
Canada (Ontario)	North Bay	North Bay/Jack Garland Airport	Seasonal	
Canada (Ontario)	Ottawa	Ottawa Macdonald–Cartier International Airport		
Canada (Ontario)	Sault Ste. Marie	Sault Ste. Marie Airport	Seasonal	
Canada (Ontario)	Sudbury	Sudbury Airport	Seasonal	
Canada (Ontario)	Thunder Bay	Thunder Bay International Airport	Seasonal	
Canada (Ontario)	Toronto	Toronto Pearson International Airport	Focus city	
Canada (Ontario)	Windsor	Windsor Airport	Seasonal	
Canada (Prince Edward Island)	Charlottetown	Charlottetown Airport	Seasonal	
Canada (Quebec)	Bagotville	Saguenay-Bagotville Airport	Seasonal	
Canada (Quebec)	Montreal	Montréal–Trudeau International Airport		
Canada (Quebec)	Quebec City	Québec City Jean Lesage International Airport	Seasonal	
Canada (Saskatchewan)	Regina	Regina International Airport		
Canada (Saskatchewan)	Saskatoon	Saskatoon John G. Diefenbaker International Airport		
Canada (Yukon)	Whitehorse	Erik Nielsen Whitehorse International Airport	Seasonal	
Cayman Islands	George Town	Owen Roberts International Airport		
Colombia	San Andrés Island	Gustavo Rojas Pinilla International Airport		
Costa Rica	Liberia	Guanacaste Airport		
Curaçao	Willemstad	Hato International Airport		
Dominican Republic	Puerto Plata	Gregorio Luperón International Airport		
Dominican Republic	Punta Cana	Punta Cana International Airport		
Dominican Republic	Samana	Samaná El Catey International Airport		
France	Paris	Charles de Gaulle Airport		
Grenada	St. George's	Maurice Bishop International Airport	Seasonal	
Honduras	Roatán	Juan Manuel Gálvez International Airport	Seasonal	
Iceland	Reykjavík	Keflavík International Airport	Seasonal	
Ireland	Dublin	Dublin Airport	Seasonal	
Italy	Rome	Leonardo da Vinci–Fiumicino Airport	Seasonal	
Jamaica	Kingston	Norman Manley International Airport		
Jamaica	Montego Bay	Sangster International Airport		
Japan	Tokyo	Narita International Airport		
Mexico	Cancún	Cancún International Airport		
Mexico	Cozumel	Cozumel International Airport	Seasonal	
Mexico	Guadalajara	Guadalajara International Airport		
Mexico	Huatulco	Bahías de Huatulco International Airport	Seasonal	
Mexico	Ixtapa/Zihuatanejo	Ixtapa-Zihuatanejo International Airport	Seasonal	
Mexico	Loreto	Loreto International Airport	Seasonal	
Mexico	Manzanillo	Playa de Oro International Airport	Seasonal	
Mexico	Mazatlán	Mazatlán International Airport	Seasonal	
Mexico	Mérida	Mérida International Airport	Seasonal	
Mexico	Mexico City	Mexico City International Airport		
Mexico	Puerto Escondido	Puerto Escondido International Airport		
Mexico	Puerto Vallarta	Licenciado Gustavo Díaz Ordaz International Airport		
Mexico	San José del Cabo	Los Cabos International Airport		
Mexico	Tepic	Tepic International Airport		
Mexico	Tulum	Tulum International Airport	Seasonal	
Netherlands	Amsterdam	Amsterdam Airport Schiphol	Seasonal	
Nicaragua	Managua	Augusto C. Sandino International Airport		
Panama	Panama City	Tocumen International Airport		
Panama	Río Hato	Scarlett Martínez International Airport		
Portugal	Lisbon	Lisbon Airport	Seasonal	
Portugal	Ponta Delgada	John Paul II Ponta Delgada Airport	Seasonal	
Puerto Rico	San Juan	Luis Muñoz Marín International Airport	Seasonal	
Saint Lucia	Vieux Fort	Hewanorra International Airport		
Saint Maarten	Philipsburg	Princess Juliana International Airport		
South Korea	Seoul	Incheon International Airport	Seasonal	
Spain	Barcelona	Josep Tarradellas Barcelona–El Prat Airport	Seasonal	
Turks and Caicos Islands	Providenciales	Providenciales International Airport	Seasonal	
United Kingdom	Cardiff	Cardiff Airport	Seasonal	
United Kingdom	Edinburgh	Edinburgh Airport	Seasonal	
United Kingdom	London	Gatwick Airport	Seasonal	
United Kingdom	London	Heathrow Airport		
United States	Anchorage	Ted Stevens Anchorage International Airport	Seasonal	
United States	Austin	Austin–Bergstrom International Airport	Seasonal	
United States	Atlanta	Hartsfield–Jackson Atlanta International Airport		
United States	Boston	Logan International Airport	Seasonal	
United States	Chicago	O'Hare International Airport	Seasonal	
United States	Denver	Denver International Airport	Seasonal	
United States	Detroit	Detroit Metropolitan Wayne County Airport	Seasonal	
United States	Fort Lauderdale	Fort Lauderdale–Hollywood International Airport		
United States	Fort Myers	Southwest Florida International Airport		
United States	Honolulu	Daniel K. Inouye International Airport		
United States	Houston	George Bush Intercontinental Airport		
United States	Kahului/Maui	Kahului Airport		
United States	Kailua-Kona	Kona International Airport	Seasonal	
United States	Las Vegas	Harry Reid International Airport		
United States	Lihue	Lihue Airport	Seasonal	
United States	Los Angeles	Los Angeles International Airport		
United States	Minneapolis	Minneapolis–Saint Paul International Airport		
United States	Nashville	Nashville International Airport	Seasonal	
United States	New York City	John F. Kennedy International Airport		
United States	Orange County/Santa Ana	John Wayne Airport		
United States	Orlando	Orlando International Airport		
United States	Palm Springs	Palm Springs International Airport		
United States	Phoenix	Phoenix Sky Harbor International Airport		
United States	Salt Lake City	Salt Lake City International Airport	Seasonal	
United States	San Diego	San Diego International Airport		
United States	San Francisco	San Francisco International Airport		
United States	Seattle	Seattle-Tacoma International Airport	Seasonal	
United States	Tampa	Tampa International Airport		
United States	Washington, D.C.	Dulles International Airport	Seasonal	

== WestJet Encore destinations ==
Country	City	Airport	Notes	Refs
Canada (Alberta)	Calgary	Calgary International Airport	Hub	
Canada (Alberta)	Edmonton	Edmonton International Airport	Focus city	
Canada (Alberta)	Fort McMurray	Fort McMurray Airport		
Canada (Alberta)	Grande Prairie	Grande Prairie Airport		
Canada (British Columbia)	Abbotsford	Abbotsford International Airport		
Canada (British Columbia)	Campbell River	Campbell River Airport	Seasonal	
Canada (British Columbia)	Comox	Comox Valley Airport		
Canada (British Columbia)	Cranbrook	Cranbrook/Canadian Rockies International Airport		
Canada (British Columbia)	Fort St. John	Fort St. John Airport		
Canada (British Columbia)	Kamloops	Kamloops Airport		
Canada (British Columbia)	Kelowna	Kelowna International Airport		
Canada (British Columbia)	Nanaimo	Nanaimo Airport		
Canada (British Columbia)	Penticton	Penticton Regional Airport		
Canada (British Columbia)	Prince George	Prince George Airport		
Canada (British Columbia)	Terrace	Northwest Regional Airport		
Canada (British Columbia)	Vancouver	Vancouver International Airport	Focus city	
Canada (British Columbia)	Victoria	Victoria International Airport		
Canada (Manitoba)	Brandon	Brandon Municipal Airport		
Canada (Manitoba)	Winnipeg	Winnipeg James Armstrong Richardson International Airport	Focus city	
Canada (Northwest Territories)	Yellowknife	Yellowknife Airport		
Canada (Ontario)	Thunder Bay	Thunder Bay International Airport		
Canada (Saskatchewan)	Regina	Regina International Airport		
Canada (Saskatchewan)	Saskatoon	Saskatoon John G. Diefenbaker International Airport		
United States	Minneapolis	Minneapolis–Saint Paul International Airport		
United States	Portland, OR	Portland International Airport	Seasonal	
United States	Seattle	Seattle–Tacoma International Airport	Seasonal	

== Terminated destinations ==
Country	City	Airport	Notes	Refs
Bermuda	Hamilton	L.F. Wade International Airport	Terminated	
Canada (Alberta)	Lethbridge	Lethbridge Airport	Terminated	
Canada (Alberta)	Medicine Hat	Medicine Hat Airport	Terminated	
Canada (Alberta/Saskatchewan)	Lloydminster	Lloydminster Airport	Terminated	
Canada (British Columbia)	Dawson Creek	Dawson Creek Airport	Terminated	
Canada (Manitoba)	Thompson	Thompson Airport	Terminated	
Canada (New Brunswick)	Saint John	Saint John Airport	Terminated	
Canada (Newfoundland and Labrador)	Gander	Gander International Airport	Terminated	
Costa Rica	San José	Juan Santamaría International Airport	Terminated	
Cuba	Cayo Coco	Jardines del Rey Airport	Terminated	
Cuba	Cayo Largo	Vilo Acuña Airport	Terminated	
Cuba	Cayo Santa Maria	Abel Santamaría Airport	Terminated	
Cuba	Cienfuegos	Jaime González Airport	Terminated	
Cuba	Havana	José Martí International Airport	Terminated	
Cuba	Holguín	Frank País Airport	Terminated	
Cuba	Santa Clara	Abel Santamaría Airport	Terminated	
Cuba	Varadero	Juan Gualberto Gómez Airport	Terminated	
Denmark	Copenhagen	Copenhagen Airport	Terminated	
Dominican Republic	La Romana	La Romana International Airport	Terminated	
Spain	Madrid	Madrid–Barajas Airport	Terminated	
Trinidad and Tobago	Port of Spain	Piarco International Airport	Terminated	
United Kingdom	Glasgow	Glasgow Airport	Terminated	
United States	Atlantic City	Atlantic City International Airport	Terminated	
United States	Dallas	Dallas Fort Worth International Airport	Terminated	
United States	Mesa	Phoenix–Mesa Gateway Airport	Terminated	
United States	Miami	Miami International Airport	Terminated	
United States	Myrtle Beach	Myrtle Beach International Airport	Terminated	
United States	New York City	LaGuardia Airport	Terminated	
United States	New Orleans	Louis Armstrong New Orleans International Airport	Terminated	
United States	Newark	Newark Liberty International Airport	Terminated	
United States	Raleigh/Durham	Raleigh-Durham International Airport	Terminated	
United States	Sarasota	Sarasota–Bradenton International Airport	Terminated	
United States	West Palm Beach	Palm Beach International Airport	Terminated	
