= WestJet Link =

Regional airline of Canada (2017–2024)

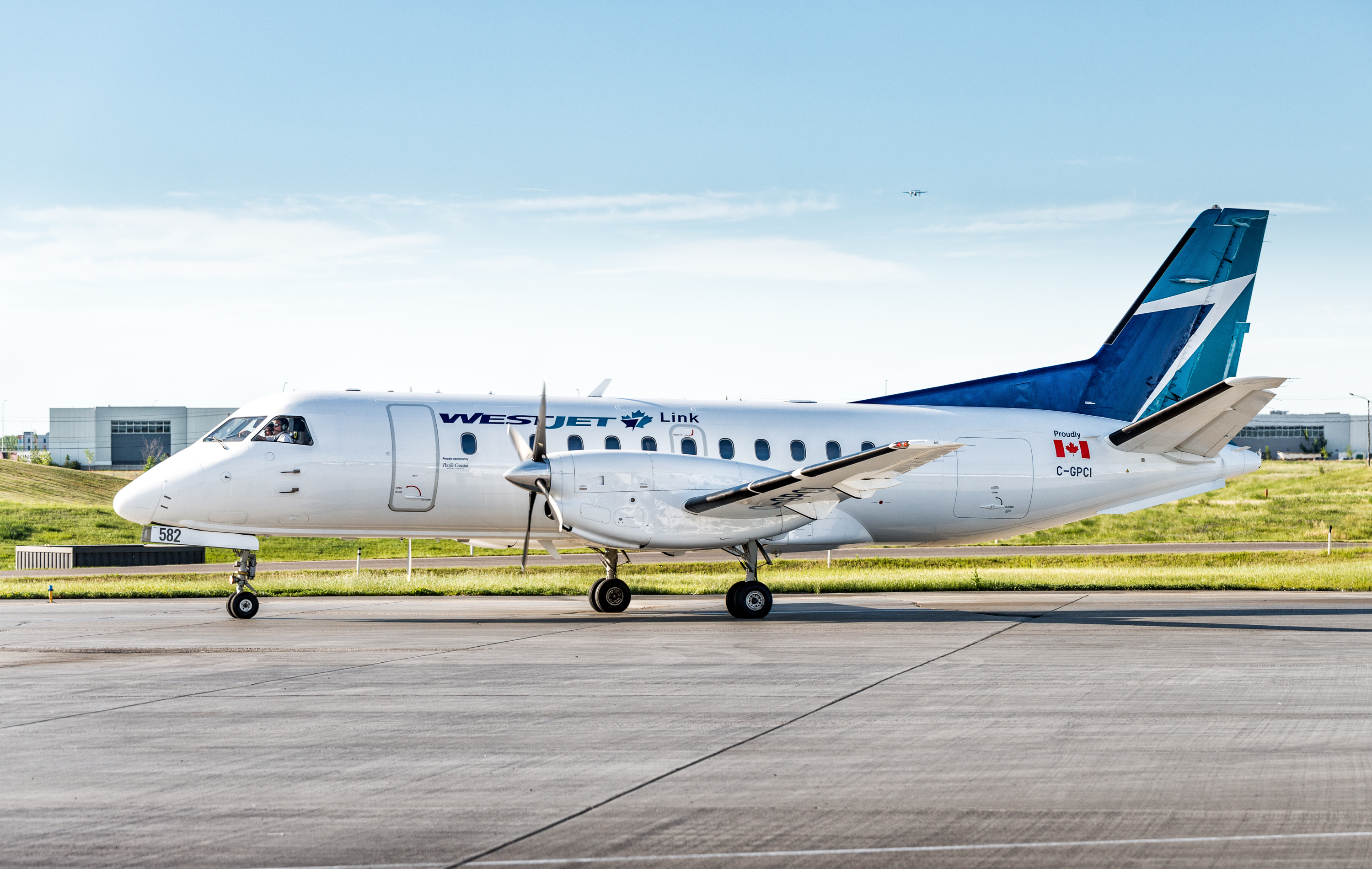
- WestJet Link Saab 340B in 2018
IATA	ICAO	Call sign
8P	PCO	PASCO
- Founded: November 24, 2017
- Commenced operations: June 21, 2018
- Ceased operations: October 26, 2024
- Hubs: Calgary; Vancouver
- Frequent-flyer program: WestJet Rewards
- Fleet size: 5
- Destinations: 8
- Parent company: WestJet
- Headquarters: Calgary, Alberta, Canada
- Website: www.westjet.com

WestJet Link was a brand name under which Pacific Coastal Airlines operated feeder flights for WestJet.

== History ==
Service was originally planned to commence on March 7, 2018, but was delayed until June 21, 2018. The brand was created to primarily connect smaller cities in western Canada with WestJet's domestic hubs at Calgary International Airport and Vancouver International Airport and stimulate air travel in smaller markets. On May 13, 2024, WestJet announced that the brand would cease all operations on October 26, 2024, with all operations transferred back to the WestJet Encore brand.

== Destinations ==
WestJet Link connected the WestJet mainline service with nine destinations in British Columbia and Alberta. All flights operated into or out of Calgary International Airport or Vancouver International Airport.

Province	City	Airport	Notes	Refs
Alberta	Calgary	Calgary International Airport	Hub	
Alberta	Lethbridge	Lethbridge Airport		
Alberta	Medicine Hat	Medicine Hat Airport		
Alberta/Saskatchewan	Lloydminster	Lloydminster Airport	Terminated	
British Columbia	Cranbrook	Cranbrook/Canadian Rockies International Airport		
British Columbia	Comox	Comox Valley Airport		
British Columbia	Kamloops	Kamloops Airport		
British Columbia	Nanaimo	Nanaimo Airport		
British Columbia	Vancouver	Vancouver International Airport	Hub	

== Operators and fleet ==
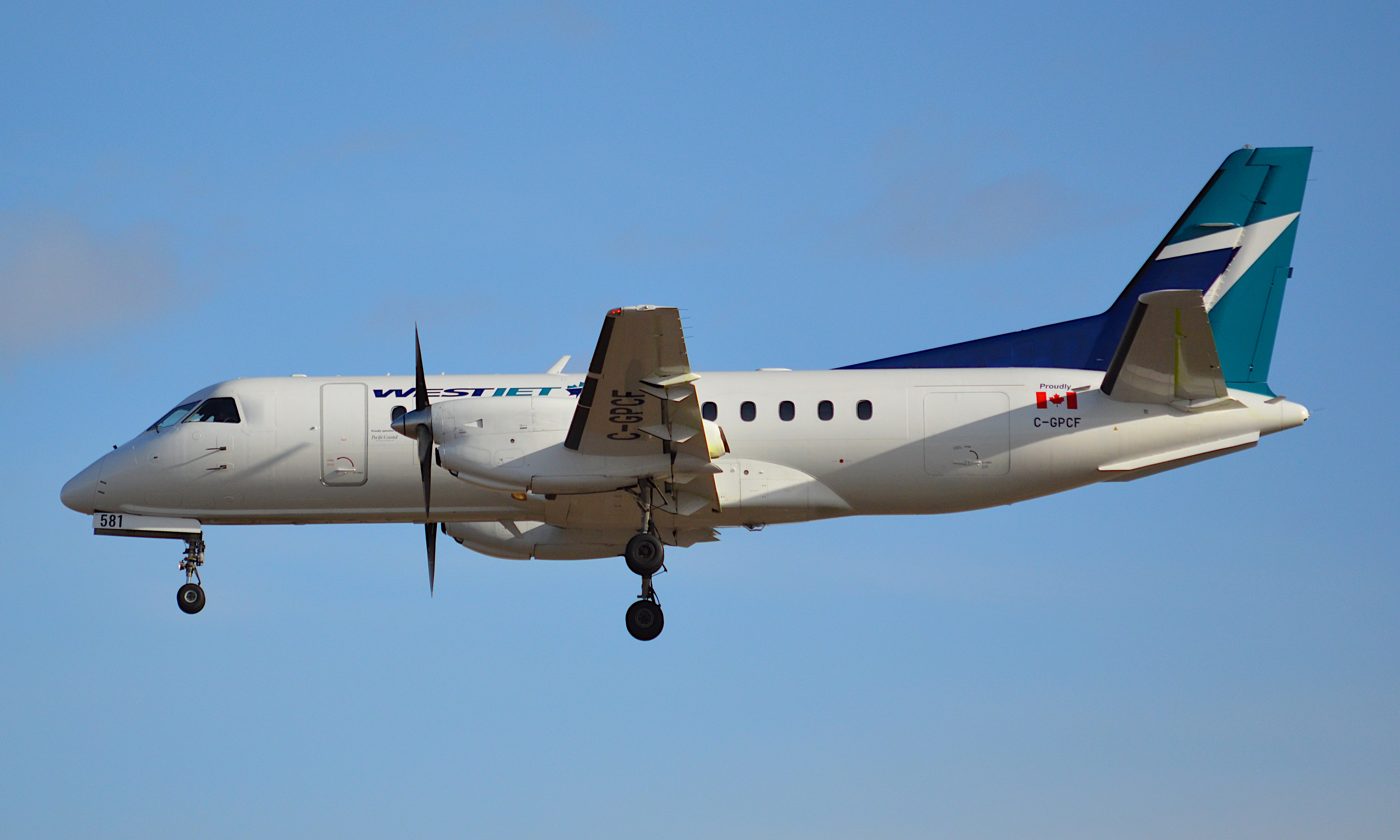
A former WestJet Link Saab 340 operated by Pacific Coastal Airlines in 2018

All WestJet Link flights were operated by Pacific Coastal using its fleet of 34-seat Saab 340 aircraft. Only the first two WestJet Link aircraft display the word 'Link' on the livery, the rest used the standard WestJet colours. As of October 2024, Pacific Coastal Airlines had 5 Saab 340s painted and operating for WestJet Link.

WestJet Link fleet
Airline	IATA service	ICAO code	Callsign	Aircraft	In service	Passengers
Pacific Coastal Airlines	8P	PCO	PASCO	Saab 340	5	34
Total					5	

== See also ==
- List of WestJet destinations
- WestJet Encore
