= Pacific Coastal Airlines =

Canadian regional airline servicing British Columbia

Pacific Coastal Airlines Ltd.

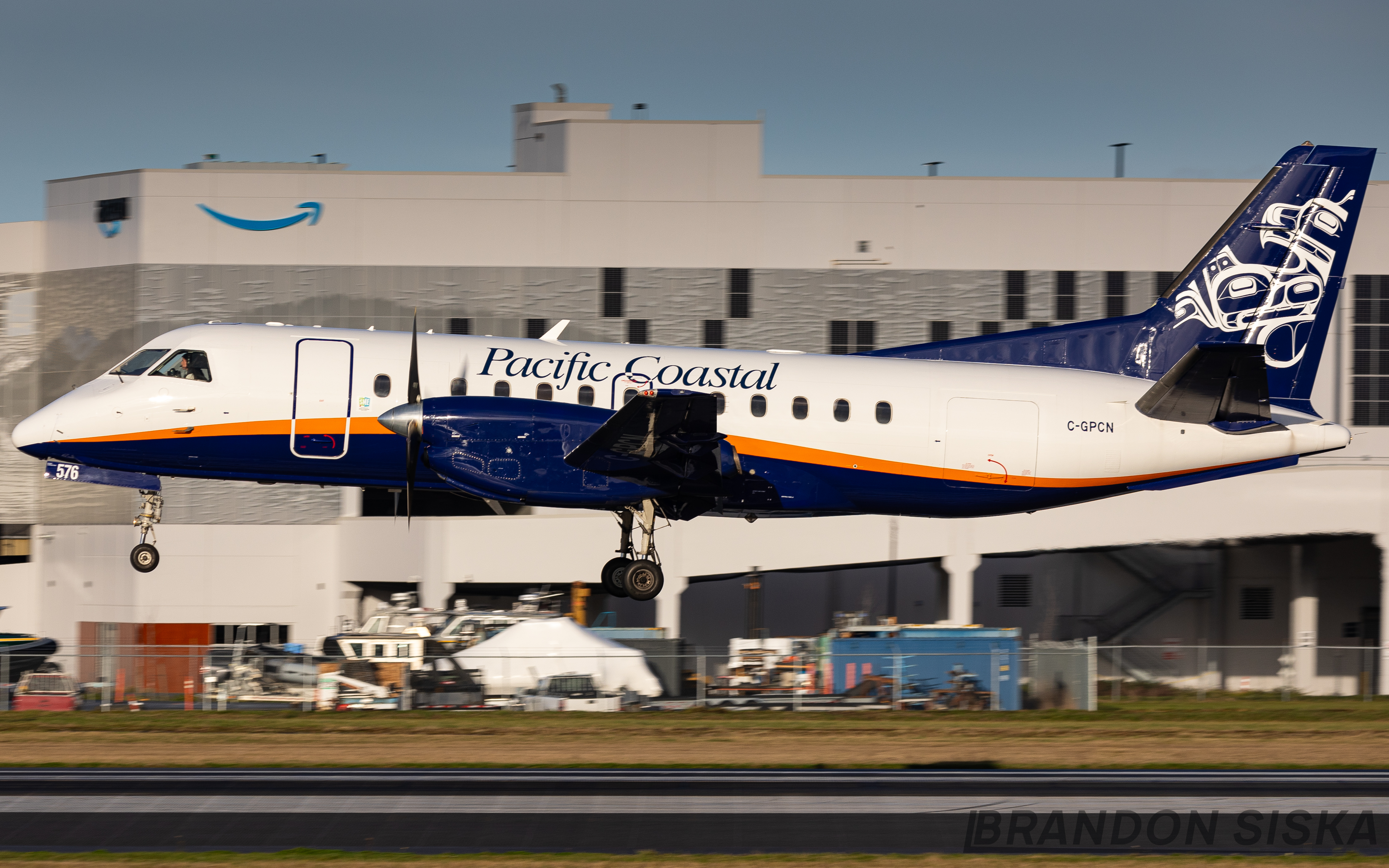
- Pacific Coastal Airlines Saab 340
| IATA | ICAO | Call sign |
|---|---|---|
| 8P | PCO | PASCO |
- Founded: 1987; 39 years ago
- AOC #: Pacific Coastal 2870, Wilderness 18449
- Hubs: Vancouver International Airport
- Fleet size: 28
- Destinations: 19
- Headquarters: 4980 Cowley Crescent, Sea Island, Richmond, British Columbia
- Key people: Smith family
- Website: www.pacificcoastal.com www.wildernessseaplanes.com

Pacific Coastal Airlines is a Canadian regional airline that operates scheduled, charter and cargo services to destinations in British Columbia. Its head office is located in the South Terminal of Vancouver International Airport in Richmond, British Columbia. Its main base is Vancouver International Airport.

== History ==
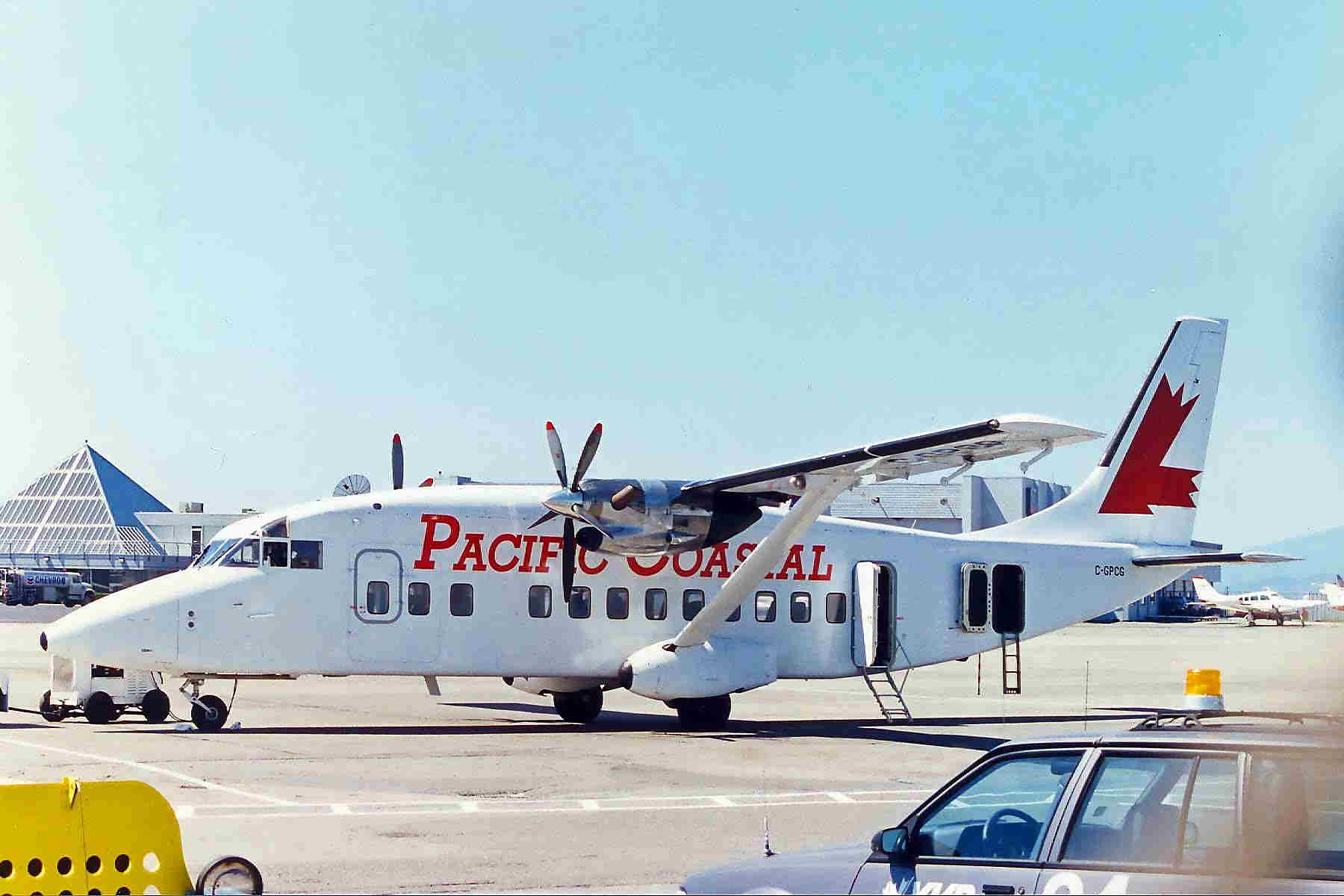
Shorts SH.360 in the very first livery

The original Pacific Coastal Airlines was established in 1956 as Cassidair Services, operating from its base at the airport in Cassidy, now Nanaimo Airport, south of Nanaimo. In early 1980, the airline was acquired by Jim Pattison Industries and absorbed into Airwest Airlines, also recently acquired by Pattison. At the time of the acquisition, Pacific Coastal was operating on the Nanaimo-Vancouver, Victoria–Nanaimo–Comox–Campbell River–Port Hardy, and Nanaimo-Qualicum Beach–Port Alberni routes. On November 1, 1980, Airwest and several other local airlines recently acquired by Pattison were merged into Air BC.

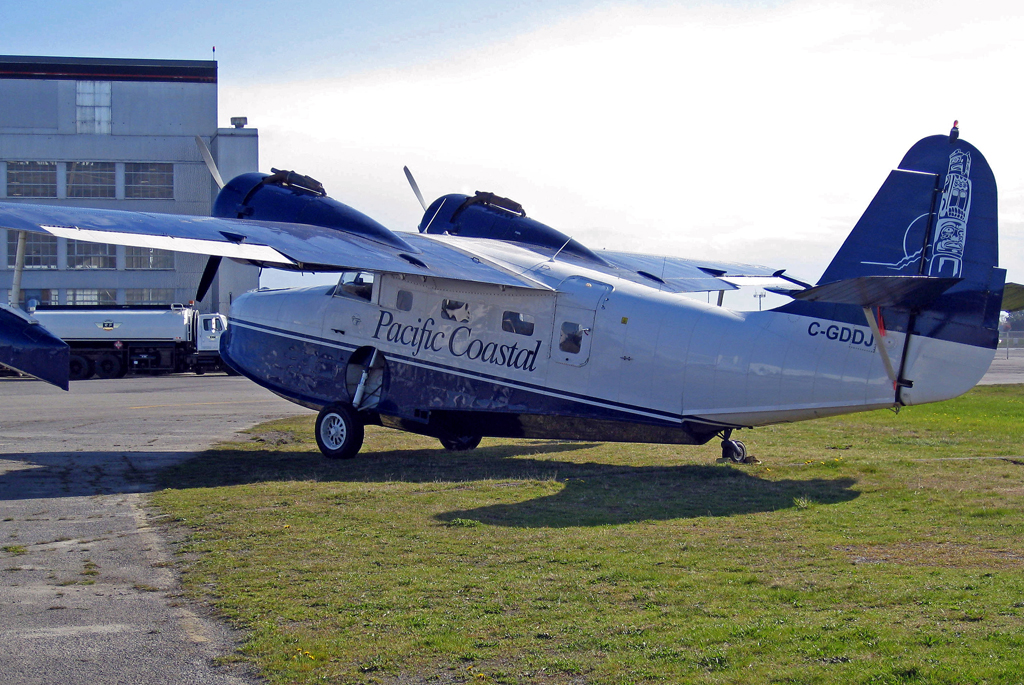
Grumman G-21 Goose of Pacific Coastal Airlines at Vancouver International Airport in 2008; it was later operated by Wilderness Seaplanes.

The current Pacific Coastal Airlines was established in 1987 by the merger of Powell Air and the Port Hardy division of Air BC. It acquired the shares and assets of Wilderness Seaplanes on April 1, 1998.

A new airline division, Wilderness Seaplanes, which started service on May 5, 2016, was established to take over the Pacific Coastal Airlines Seaplane Division and is based at Port Hardy and Bella Bella.

On November 24, 2017, WestJet and Pacific Coastal announced a capacity purchase agreement for Pacific Coastal to operate Saab 340 aircraft under the WestJet Link brand commencing in June 2018. These aircraft were based at the WestJet hub at Calgary International Airport and served destinations such as Lethbridge and Lloydminster with aircraft also being based at Vancouver International Airport with service to Cranbrook and Comox. On May 13, 2024, WestJet announced that its aircraft capacity purchase agreement with Pacific Coastal was completed, and would not be renewed. Consequently, the airline announced that WestJet Link would be shut down on October 26 of that year and all operations would be transferred to WestJet Encore by no later than the following day.

== Destinations in British Columbia ==
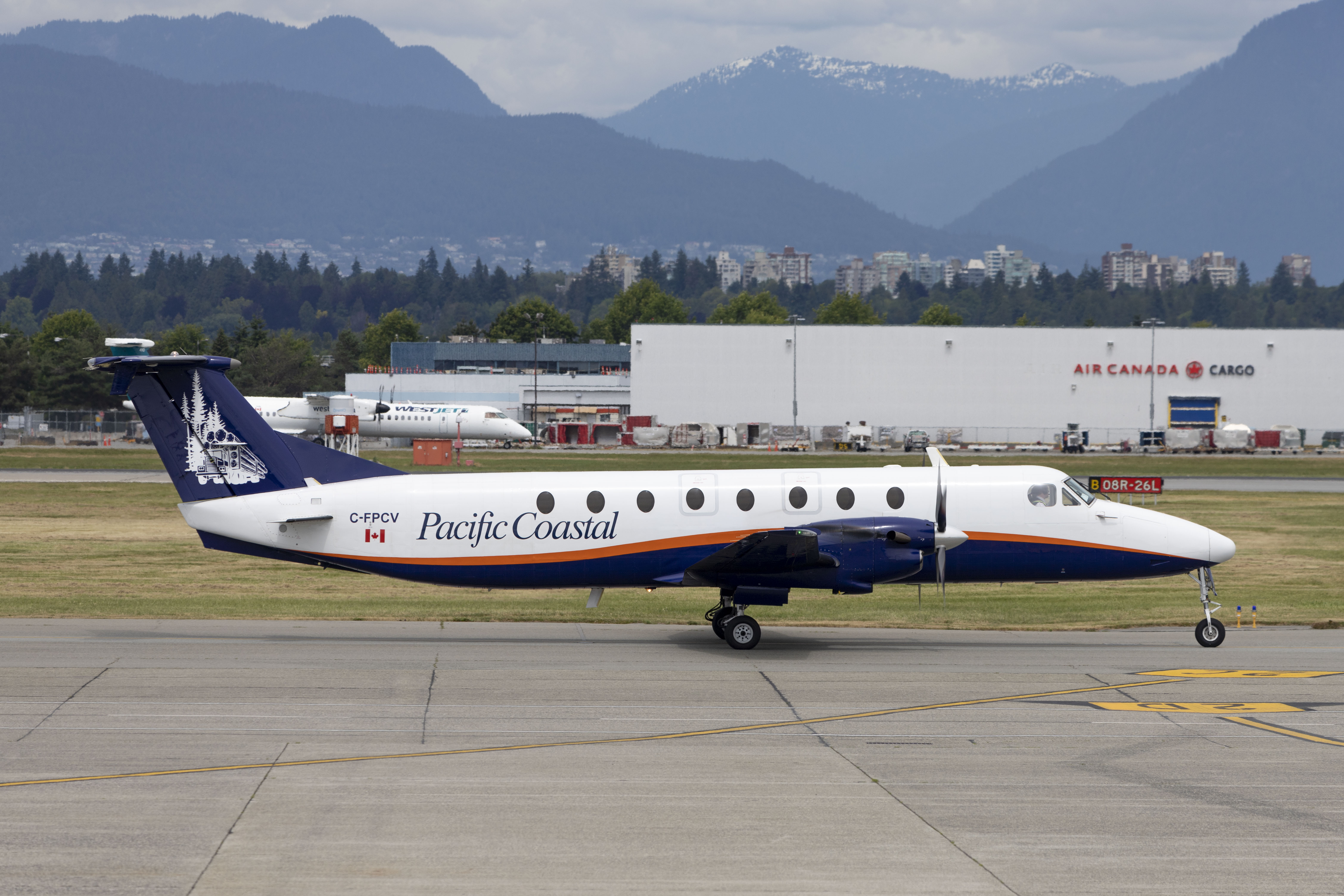
Beechcraft 1900C

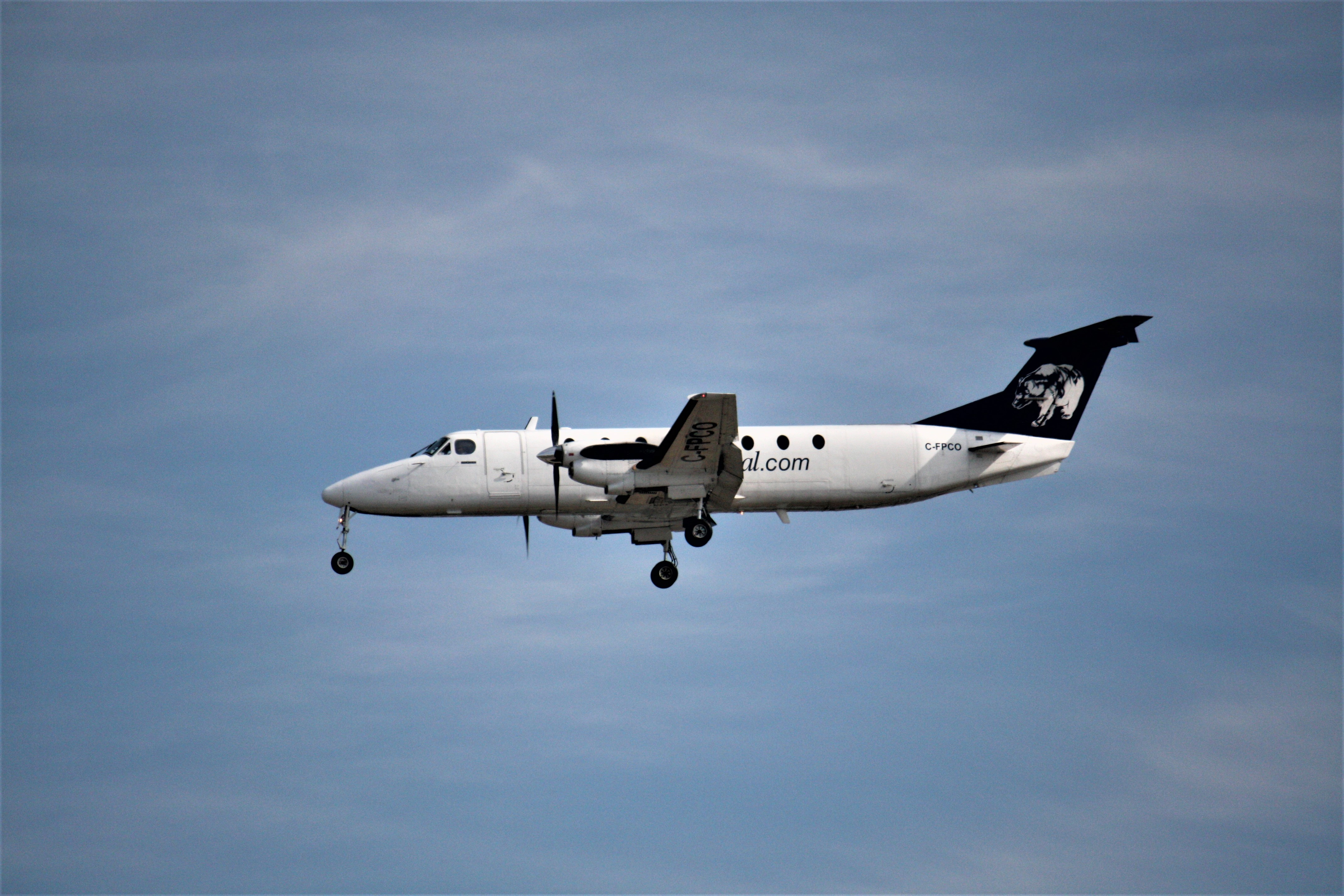
Beechcraft 1900C

As of 6 November 2026, Pacific Coastal Airlines operates services to the following 19 destinations in British Columbia:

- Anahim Lake (Anahim Lake Airport)
- Bella Bella (Bella Bella (Campbell Island) Airport)
- Bella Coola (Bella Coola Airport)
- Campbell River (Campbell River Airport)
- Comox (Comox Airport)
- Cranbrook (Canadian Rockies International Airport)
- Kamloops (Kamloops Airport)
- Kelowna (Kelowna International Airport)
- Masset (Masset Airport)
- Nanaimo (Nanaimo Airport)
- Penticton (Penticton Regional Airport)
- Port Hardy (Port Hardy Airport)
- Powell River (Powell River Airport)
- Prince George (Prince George Airport)
- Tofino / Ucluelet (Tofino-Long Beach Airport)
- Trail (Trail Airport)
- Vancouver (Vancouver International Airport) hub
- Victoria (Victoria International Airport)
- Williams Lake (Williams Lake Airport)

== Fleet ==
As of 6 November 2026, Pacific Coastal Airlines had twenty-one aircraft registered with Transport Canada, plus seven registered to Wilderness Seaplanes:

Pacific Coastal Airlines fleet
| Aircraft | Number | Variants | Notes |
|---|---|---|---|
| Beechcraft 1900 | 11 | 2 - 1900C; 9 - 1900D | 19 passengers, based in Vancouver |
| Cessna 185 Skywagon | 1 | C-185F | 3 passengers, based in Port Hardy, operated by Wilderness Seaplanes |
| de Havilland Canada DHC-2 Beaver | 3 | DHC-2 MK. I | 4 passengers, based in Port Hardy, two operated by Wilderness Seaplanes |
| Grumman G-21 Goose | 4 | G-21A | 9 passengers, based in Port Hardy, includes three craft operated by Wilderness Seaplanes and one by Pacific Coastal (not on website) |
| Saab 340 | 9 | 1 - SF340A; 8 - SF340B | 34 passengers, based in Vancouver and Calgary (June 2018). Previously operated for WestJet Link |
| Total | 28 | | |

== Incidents and accidents ==
- On August 3, 2008, a Grumman G-21 Goose aircraft with seven passengers and crew crashed during a flight from Port Hardy to Chamiss Bay. The aircraft was completely destroyed by a fire. There were only two survivors.
- On November 16, 2008, a Grumman G-21 Goose aircraft with seven passengers and one pilot crashed on South Thormanby Island off British Columbia's Sunshine Coast, during a flight from Vancouver International Airport to Toba Inlet. The plane was flown into a hillside and exploded into a mass of burning wreckage according to the lone survivor, who was rescued by the Canadian Coast Guard.
