= List of Swoop destinations =

This is a list of destinations that Swoop operated prior to October 2023. The Canadian low-cost carrier, which was founded as a WestJet subsidiary in 2017, operated to these destinations with a fleet of Boeing 737 aircraft.

== List ==
Country (province/state)	City	Airport	Notes	Refs
Canada (Alberta)	Edmonton	Edmonton International Airport	Base	
Canada (British Columbia)	Abbotsford	Abbotsford International Airport	Base	
Canada (British Columbia)	Comox	CFB Comox	Terminated	
Canada (British Columbia)	Kelowna	Kelowna International Airport	Terminated	
Canada (British Columbia)	Victoria	Victoria International Airport	Terminated	
Canada (Manitoba)	Winnipeg	Winnipeg James Armstrong Richardson International Airport	Base	
Canada (New Brunswick)	Moncton	Greater Moncton Roméo LeBlanc International Airport	Terminated	
Canada (New Brunswick)	Saint John	Saint John Airport	Terminated	
Canada (Newfoundland and Labrador)	Deer Lake	Deer Lake Regional Airport	Terminated	
Canada (Newfoundland and Labrador)	St. John's	St. John's International Airport	Terminated	
Canada (Nova Scotia)	Halifax	Halifax Stanfield International Airport	Terminated	
Canada (Ontario)	Hamilton	John C. Munro Hamilton International Airport	Base	
Canada (Ontario)	London	London International Airport	Terminated	
Canada (Ontario)	Ottawa	Ottawa Macdonald–Cartier International Airport	Terminated	
Canada (Ontario)	Toronto	Toronto Pearson International Airport	Base	
Canada (Prince Edward Island)	Charlottetown	Charlottetown Airport	Terminated	
Canada (Saskatchewan)	Regina	Regina International Airport	Terminated	
Canada (Saskatchewan)	Saskatoon	Saskatoon John G. Diefenbaker International Airport	Terminated	
Cuba	Varadero	Juan Gualberto Gómez Airport	Terminated	
Dominican Republic	Punta Cana	Punta Cana International Airport	Terminated	
Jamaica	Kingston	Norman Manley International Airport	Terminated	
Jamaica	Montego Bay	Sangster International Airport	Terminated	
Mexico (Baja California Sur)	San José del Cabo	Los Cabos International Airport	Terminated	
Mexico (Jalisco)	Puerto Vallarta	Licenciado Gustavo Díaz Ordaz International Airport	Terminated	
Mexico (Quintana Roo)	Cancún	Cancún International Airport	Terminated	
Mexico (Sinaloa)	Mazatlán	Mazatlán International Airport	Terminated	
United States (Arizona)	Phoenix	Phoenix–Mesa Gateway Airport	Terminated	
United States (California)	Palm Springs	Palm Springs International Airport	Terminated	
United States (California)	San Diego	San Diego International Airport	Terminated	
United States (Florida)	Fort Lauderdale	Fort Lauderdale–Hollywood International Airport	Terminated	
United States (Florida)	Orlando	Orlando International Airport	Terminated	
United States (Florida)	Orlando	Orlando Sanford International Airport	Terminated	
United States (Florida)	St. Petersburg	St. Pete–Clearwater International Airport	Terminated	
United States (Florida)	Tampa	Tampa International Airport	Terminated	
United States (Illinois)	Chicago	O'Hare International Airport	Terminated	
United States (Nevada)	Las Vegas	Harry Reid International Airport	Terminated	
United States (New York)	New York City	John F. Kennedy International Airport	Terminated	
United States (Tennessee)	Nashville	Nashville International Airport	Terminated	

== See also ==
- List of WestJet destinations
