= Port Hardy Airport =

- IATA: YZT; ICAO: CYZT; WMO: 71109

Summary
- Airport type: Public
- Operator: Transport Canada
- Location: Port Hardy, British Columbia
- Time zone: MST (UTC−07:00)
- Elevation AMSL: 71 ft (22 m)
- Coordinates: 50°40′50″N 127°22′00″W

Map
- Location in British Columbia CYZT (Canada)

Runways
Direction	Length		Surface
Direction	ft	m	Surface
08/26	4,000	1,219	Asphalt
11/29	4,999	1,524	Asphalt

Statistics (2010)
- Aircraft movements: 10,194
- Sources: Canada Flight Supplement; Environment Canada; Movements from Statistics Canada

Port Hardy Airport (IATA: YZT, ICAO: CYZT) is located 5.2 nautical miles (9.6 km; 6.0 mi) southeast of Port Hardy, British Columbia, Canada.

The airport is classified as an airport of entry by Nav Canada and is staffed by the Canada Border Services Agency (CBSA). CBSA officers at this airport can handle general aviation aircraft only, with no more than 15 passengers.

There are no Canada Border staff based at the Port Hardy Airport. A Canpass toll free number is available for CBSA service.

== Airlines and destinations ==
Airlines	Destinations
Pacific Coastal Airlines	Vancouver; Charter: Bella Bella, Terrace/Kitimat

== History ==
In approximately 1942 the aerodrome was listed as RCAF Aerodrome - Port Hardy, British Columbia at 50°40′N 127°23′W with a variation of 26 degrees E and elevation of 40 feet (12 m). The aerodrome is listed as "serviceable" with three runways as follows:

Runway name	Length	Width	Surface
08/26	4,000 feet (1,219 m)	150 feet (46 m)	Hard surfaced
16/34	3,984 feet (1,214 m)	150 feet (46 m)	Hard surfaced
11/29	4,999 feet (1,524 m)	150 feet (46 m)	Hard surfaced

== See also ==
- List of airports on Vancouver Island
