= Anahim Lake Airport =

- IATA: YAA; ICAO: none; TC LID: CAJ4

Summary
- Airport type: Public
- Operator: Cariboo Regional District
- Location: Anahim Lake, British Columbia
- Time zone: MST (UTC−07:00)
- Elevation AMSL: 3,644 ft (1,111 m)
- Coordinates: 52°27′05″N 125°18′13″W
- Website: Official website

Map
- Location in British Columbia

Runways
| Direction | Length | | Surface |
| Direction | ft | m | Surface |
|---|---|---|---|
| 13/31 | 4,642 | 1,415 | asphalt |
- Sources

Anahim Lake Airport (IATA: YAA, TC LID: CAJ4), which serves the west Chilcotin, is about 1.0 nautical mile (1.9 km; 1.2 mi) south of the village of Anahim Lake, British Columbia, Canada.

== Lake landings ==
During the 1944–45 winter of World War II, the Canadian military held an exercise called the Polar Bear Expedition, which trained troops to operate in extreme cold. A temporary airfield was established north of the village on the frozen lake, where various aircraft took part.

== Early developments ==
In 1977, work started on the airstrip. In October 1979, the paved airstrip officially opened.

A $75,000 grant received in September 1981 was used to extend the runway to about a mile and upgrade fencing. Two years later, a larger grant completed cross stripping and paving. From 1982, the airport hosted an annual Anahim Lake Fly-In for several years. In October 1983, the Anahim Lake Airport and Nimpo Lake Airstrip associations merged to form the Anahim Lake-Nimpo Lake Airport Commission.

In mid-1984, Wilderness Airlines (subsidiary of Pacific Coastal Airlines) began scheduled flights at the airport. The next year, the government gave 70.93 hectares (175 acres) of Crown land (then in use for the airstrip or available for future expansion) to the regional district.

In 1990, the highways ministry withdrew free snow clearing at the airport. That year, the airport received a $100,000 grant to extend the runway. However, the limited storage of the gas station style fuel system was inadequate to handle the twice daily Wilderness Airlines flights. In 1991, about 910 litres; 240 US gallons (200 imp gal) of jet-B fuel spilled from a tanker into a ditch one mile west.

== Safety upgrades ==
In 1991, a DOT inspection discovered a series of safety deficiencies, prompting a threat to revoke the airport licence. A grant of up to $10,000 was received to bring the airport up to an acceptable operational standard. In 1994, the weather station lease was renewed.

In 2000, about $1 million was spent to rehabilitate the runway and taxiway to enhance safety. In 2004, the airport footprint was expanded for safety and environmental reasons. In 2010, the airport received funding for paving about 210 metres (700 ft) of existing gravel runway, which enabled safer winter landings and increased passenger carrying capacity year-round. In 2011, funding came for a runway sweeper to handle winter conditions.

== Major expansion ==
In 2013, a new self-serve fueling system was installed. That year, the new 90-square-metre (970 ft^{2}), two-storey terminal was completed. The wooden building included a large covered parking area for the runway sweeper, an office, a waiting area, two bathrooms, and a finished suite for the caretaker upstairs. The facility enabled increased airport use by residents, visitors, tourism operators, medical personnel, and the RCMP, and provided operational space for personnel during emergencies such as forest fires and medevacs. In 2014, the new terminal officially opened.

In 2021, the airport received a $300,000 grant to grade alongside the runway and to upgrade the unused runway surface so that the whole length became available. This permitted heavier passenger and cargo load limits for aircraft.

== Later developments ==
The active runway is 1,415 by 23 metres (4,642 by 75 ft). A gravel east–west runway is visible but not maintained or used. Avgas and jet fuel are pumped year-round. Tenants keep the six private hangars and four aircraft shelters occupied.

Down 50 per cent from 2021, aircraft movements in 2022 totalled 1,054 of which 12 were medevacs. The scheduled service by Pacific Coastal Airlines processes about 3,000 passengers annually at the terminal. In addition, Bella Coola Heli Sports handles about 50 charter flights. In 2023, the airport applied for a grant to help finance a 93-square-metre (1,000 ft^{2}) expansion of the terminal building. The goals set for that year included an apron expansion, better drainage, and installing solar panels on the terminal building.

== Airlines and destinations ==
| Airlines | Destinations |
|---|---|
| Pacific Coastal Airlines | Vancouver |

== Accidents and incidents ==
- May 2013: A Cessna 205 flipped forward when struck by a whirlwind on powering up.
