= Grande Prairie Airport =

Airport in Alberta, Canada

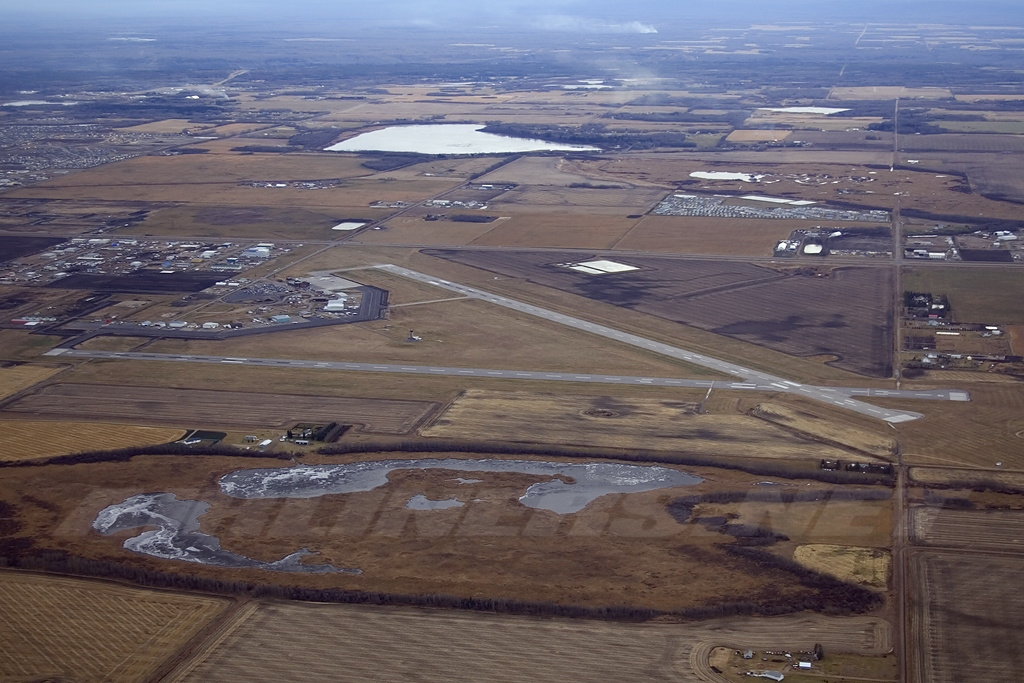
- IATA: YQU; ICAO: CYQU; WMO: 71940

Summary
- Airport type: Public
- Operator: Grande Prairie Airport Commission
- Location: Grande Prairie, Alberta
- Time zone: Alberta Time (UTC−06:00)
- Elevation AMSL: 2,196 ft (669 m)
- Coordinates: 55°10′55″N 118°53′14″W

Map
- Location in Alberta

Runways
Direction	Length		Surface
Direction	ft	m	Surface
07/25	6,200	1,890	Asphalt
12/30	8,502	2,591	Asphalt

Statistics (2010)
- Aircraft movements: 40,651
- Source: Canada Flight Supplement; Environment Canada; Movements from Statistics Canada

Grande Prairie Airport (IATA: YQU, ICAO: CYQU) is a commercial airport located 3 nautical miles (5.6 km; 3.5 mi) west northwest of Grande Prairie, Alberta, Canada. It is the largest airport in the Peace River Country of northwestern Alberta and northeastern British Columbia, having served 446,000 passengers in 2014 and 436,000 in 2015, ranking among the busiest regional airports in Canada.

The airport has seen passenger traffic growth due to the economic and population growth of the city. The terminal, originally built in 1981, has undergone extensive renovations which increased space, added a restaurant to the second floor, expanded the terminal to the south and added parking space. Further expansion added another gate, baggage carousel, and office space for customs use.

The airport is served by regional air carriers Air Canada Express and WestJet Encore, each with propjet flights to Edmonton and Calgary. Flair Airlines operated from the airport for one month before suspending service. The airport also sees charter traffic and additional traffic caused by the high density oil and gas industry in the area. The airport also serves the Royal Canadian Air Cadets Peace Region Gliding Program, who fly the Schweizer 2-33A glider off a winch launch set up.

== Airlines and destinations ==
Grande Prairie Airport is connected to Calgary International Airport by Air Canada Express and WestJet Encore, and to Edmonton International Airport by WestJet Encore.

== Historical airline service ==
Canadian Pacific Air Lines and its successors CP Air and Canadian Airlines International served Grande Prairie for many years. Canadian Pacific commenced service to Grande Prairie in the early 1940s. During the 1970s and 1980s, CP Air flew Boeing 737-200 aircraft into the airport with flights to Edmonton, Vancouver, Prince George, Fort St. John, Fort Nelson, and Whitehorse. Time Air, an Alberta-based regional airline, also served Grande Prairie during the 1970s with de Havilland Canada DHC-6 Twin Otter turboprop flights to Edmonton, Calgary and Red Deer.

== Accidents and incidents ==
On June 29, 2000, a Douglas A-26 Invader operated by Air Spray, suffered a double engine failure on final approach after a fire fighting mission. The aircraft crashed 3 kilometers short of the runway and was damaged beyond repair. The pilot escaped with injuries.

On April 7, 2001, a Beechcraft 100 King Air operated by Alberta Central Airways, slid off the runway during landing and struck a snow pile after touching down in two inches of snow. All occupants survived unharmed, but the aircraft was damaged beyond repair.
