= Bella Bella (Campbell Island) Airport =

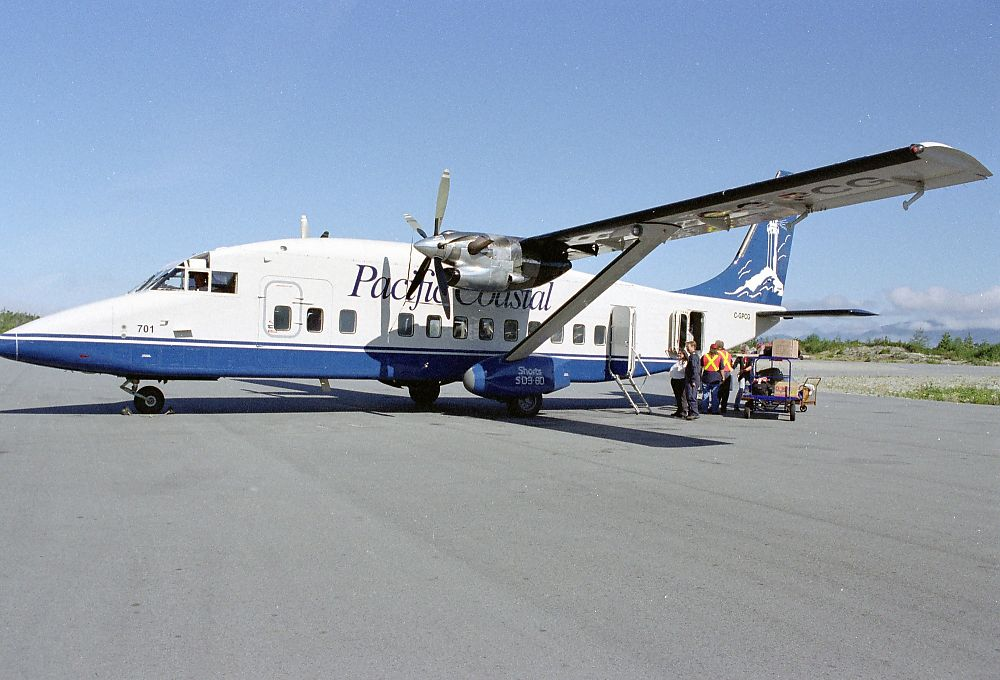
- Shorts 360 of Pacific Coastal Airlines at Bella Bella Airport
- IATA: ZEL; ICAO: none; TC LID: CBBC; WMO: 71757

Summary
- Airport type: Public
- Operator: Heiltsuk Economic Development Corp
- Serves: Bella Bella, British Columbia
- Location: Campbell Island
- Time zone: MST (UTC−07:00)
- Elevation AMSL: 141 ft / 43 m
- Coordinates: 52°11′06″N 128°09′24″W

Map
- Location in British Columbia CBBC (Canada)

Runways
| Direction | Length | | Surface |
| Direction | ft | m | Surface |
|---|---|---|---|
| 13/31 | 3,702 | 1,128 | Asphalt |

Helipads
| Number | Length | | Surface |
| Number | ft | m | Surface |
|---|---|---|---|
| Parking Pad 1 | 51 | 16 | Asphalt |
| Parking Pad 2 | 51 | 16 | Asphalt |
| Parking Pad 3 | 88 | 27 | Asphalt |
- Source: Canada Flight Supplement; Environment Canada

Bella Bella (Campbell Island) Airport (IATA: ZEL, TC LID: CBBC) is located 1 nautical mile (1.9 km; 1.2 mi) northwest of Bella Bella on Campbell Island. British Columbia, Canada. The airport is connected by paved road to the village of Bella Bella, and forms a hub of sorts for the Central Coast, with flights linking to Klemtu, Port Hardy, and Vancouver with additional flights during the summer servicing tourist and commercial operations in the area.

Considered a halfway point for small aircraft flying from Seattle, Washington, to Alaska, this airport offers a rest and refuel point for many pilots. GPS and NDB approaches are available. Only daylight operations are allowed.

== Airlines ==
| Airlines | Destinations |
|---|---|
| Pacific Coastal Airlines | Vancouver; Charter: Klemtu, Port Hardy |

== See also ==
- Bella Bella/Shearwater Water Aerodrome
- Bella Bella/Waglisla Water Aerodrome
- Denny Island Aerodrome
- Heiltsuk Nation
