= Campbell River Airport =

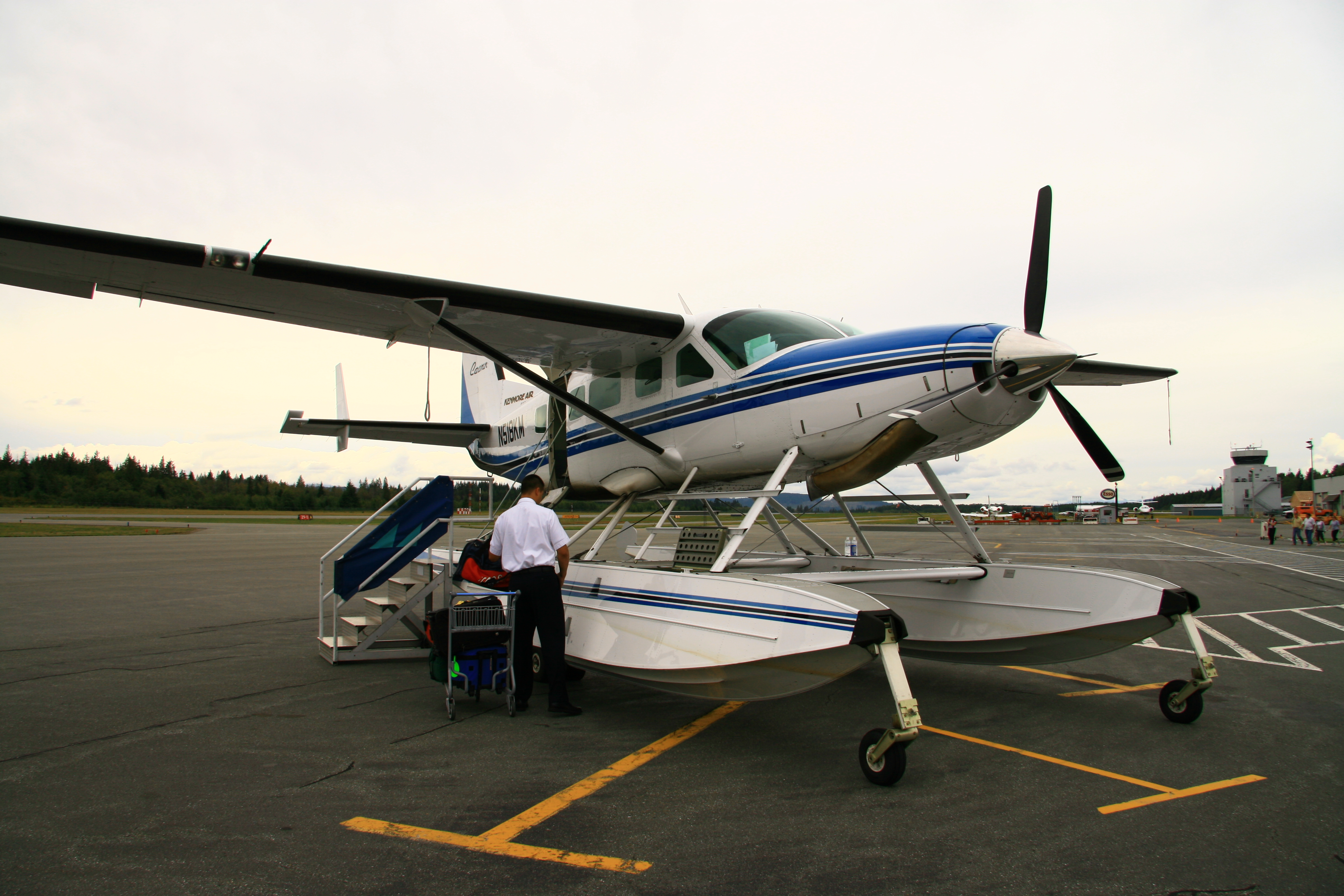
- IATA: YBL; ICAO: CYBL; WMO: 71205

Summary
- Airport type: Public
- Owner/Operator: City of Campbell River
- Location: Campbell River, British Columbia
- Time zone: MST (UTC−07:00)
- Elevation AMSL: 357 ft / 109 m
- Coordinates: 49°57′07″N 125°16′23″W
- Website: www.crairport.ca

Map
- Location in British Columbia CYBL (Canada)

Runways
| Direction | Length | | Surface |
| Direction | ft | m | Surface |
|---|---|---|---|
| 12/30 | 6,499 | 1,981 | Asphalt |

Helipads
| Number | Length | | Surface |
| Number | ft | m | Surface |
|---|---|---|---|
| Pad - 1 | 70 | 21 | Concrete |
| Pad - 2 | 50 | 15 | Asphalt |

Statistics (2010)
- Aircraft movements: 30,604
- Helicopter pads are diameters. Source: Canada Flight Supplement and Transport Canada; Environment and Climate Change Canada; Movements from Statistics Canada

Campbell River Airport (IATA: YBL, ICAO: CYBL) is located 4.5 nautical miles (8.3 km; 5.2 mi) south of the city of Campbell River, British Columbia, Canada.

The airport is classified as an airport of entry by Nav Canada and is staffed by the Canada Border Services Agency. CBSA officers at this airport currently can handle general aviation aircraft only, with no more than 15 passengers.

== Airlines and destinations ==
| Airlines | Destinations |
|---|---|
| Pacific Coastal Airlines | Vancouver |
| WestJet Encore | Seasonal: Calgary |

Vancouver Island Air provides on demand services.

== See also ==
- List of airports on Vancouver Island
