= Powell Air =

Canadian airline

IATA	ICAO	Call sign
—	PWL	POWELL AIR
- Commenced operations: 1975
- Ceased operations: 1987
- Hubs: Powell River Airport
- Fleet size: 12 (1981)
- Destinations: Powell River, Vancouver
- Headquarters: Powell River
- Key people: Daryl Smith, Lynn Mulhall and George Percy

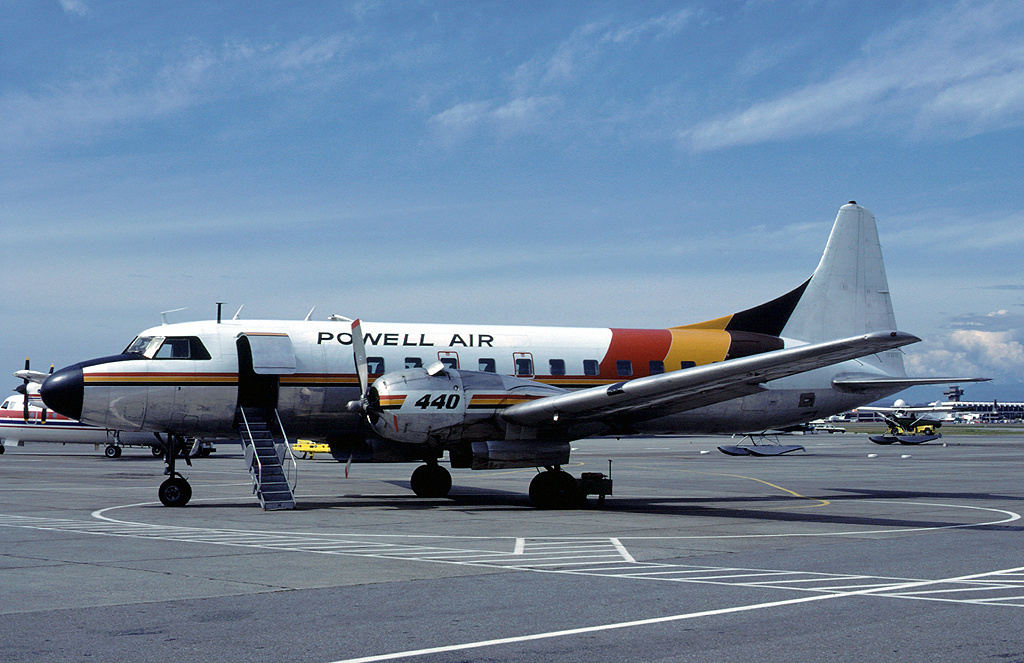
A Convair 440 at Vancouver International Airport in 1983

Powell Air was a Canadian airline based in Powell River, British Columbia. It was founded by Daryl Smith, Lynn Mulhall and George Percy in 1975 after acquiring Air West's Powell River operations. Charters were operated utilizing a combination of Cessna, de Havilland Beaver, de Havilland Otter, Piper Aztec and Piper Navajo aircraft. In 1981, the airline was awarded the right to operate the Vancouver-Powell River route, and for this purchased a Convair 440. In 1987, Powell Air and Air BC's Port Hardy operations merged to form Pacific Coastal Airlines.

== See also ==
- List of defunct airlines of Canada
