= Lloydminster Airport =

Airport in Alberta, Canada

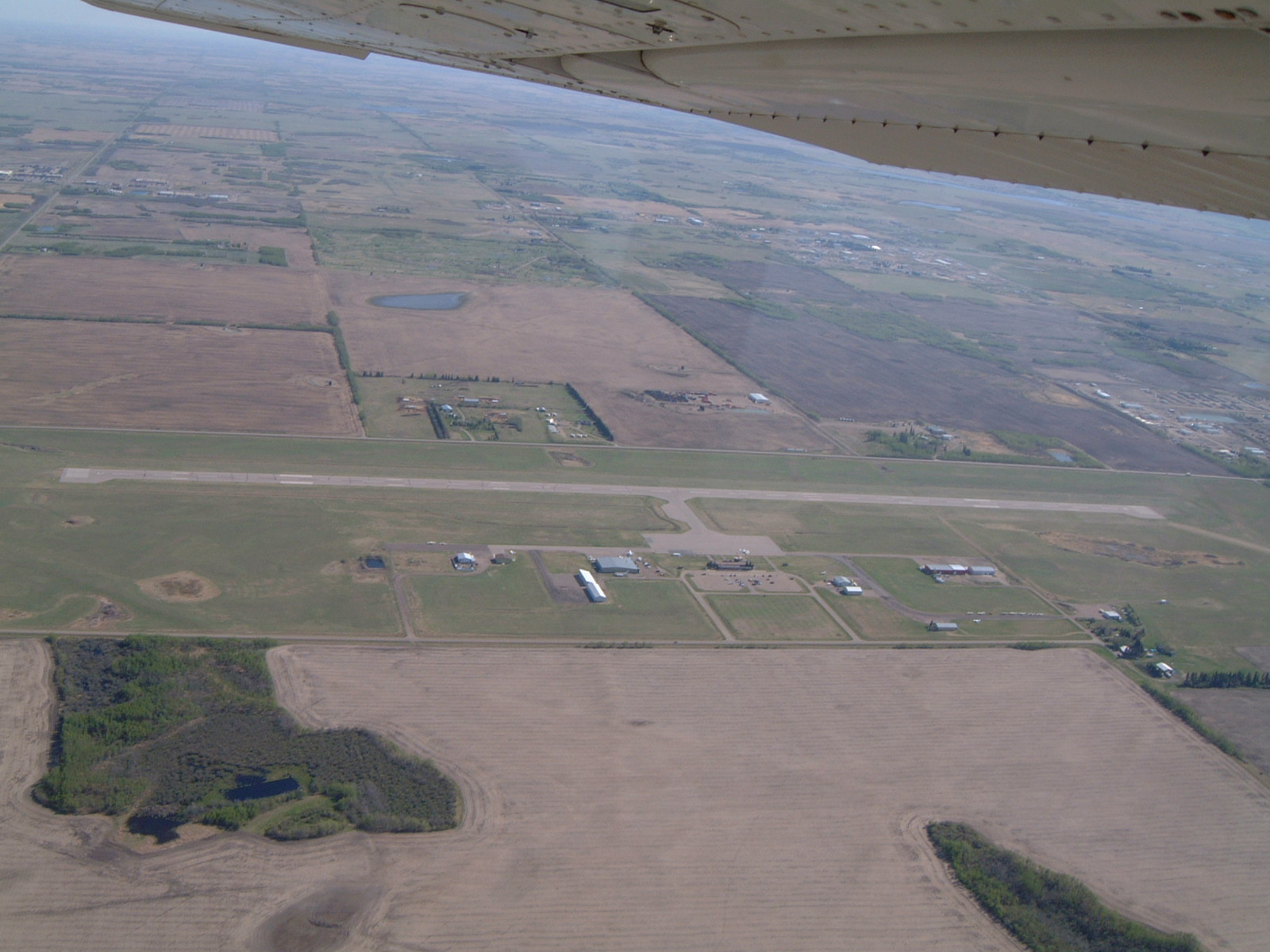
- Lloydminster Airport
- IATA: YLL; ICAO: CYLL; WMO: 71871

Summary
- Airport type: Public
- Operator: City of Lloydminster
- Serves: Lloydminster, Alberta / Saskatchewan
- Location: Lloydminster, Alberta
- Time zone: Alberta Time (UTC−06:00)
- Elevation AMSL: 2,194 ft / 669 m
- Coordinates: 53°18′38″N 110°04′27″W
- Website: Lloydminster Airport

Map
- Location in Alberta CYLL (Canada)

Runways
Direction	Length		Surface
Direction	ft	m	Surface
08/26	5,577	1,700	Asphalt
13/31	1,202	366	Turf

Statistics (2012)
- Aircraft movements: 14,680
- Sources: Canada Flight Supplement; Environment Canada; Movements from Statistics Canada

Lloydminster Airport (IATA: YLL, ICAO: CYLL) is located 2 nautical miles (3.7 km; 2.3 mi) northwest of Lloydminster, Alberta, Canada.

== History ==
Built in 1981 for $6.3 million to replace the previous Lloydminster Airport, the new airport serves as the largest airport in the region. Despite the City of Lloydminster's status as a border city straddling the provincial border, the airport is located entirely within Alberta, whereas the old airport was within Saskatchewan. Remnants of the old airport are still visible today at 53°17′54.45″N 110°00′03.85″W.

== Historical airline service ==
On November 24, 2017, WestJet announced that it had signed a deal with Pacific Coastal Airlines to launch a new regional air carrier called WestJet Link. The goal of this partnership was to connect smaller communities in both Alberta and British Columbia. Lloydminster was one of those communities. Although the launch date was supposed to be March 8, 2018, it wound up being delayed until June 21. On February 18, 2021, WestJet announced the suspension of service to Lloydminster and three other destinations due to low demand stemming from the COVID-19 pandemic. On December 14, 2023, WestJet permanently grounded service to Lloydminster, and the following day, city council announced it had request further meetings with WestJet to discuss that decision. On January 30, 2024, representatives from the city council, including the mayor, did meet with WestJet in Calgary to plead their case, pointing to the newly-upgraded runway and ability for customs clearance as reasons why the airline should continue to service Lloydminster. However, that did nothing to change WestJet's mind, who announced their departure from YLL would occur on April 15. A month after the airline left, the city council commissioned aviation consultancy firm HM Aero to commence a study on the viability of new air service. However, the results will not be released until the study concludes, which will be sometime between August and September. The Master Plan was updated by HM Aero Aviation Consulting and released in October 2024, subsequently approved by the City Council at their October 21, 2024 meeting.
