= Cranbrook/Canadian Rockies International Airport =

Airport in Cranbrook, British Columbia, Canada

Canadian Rockies International Airport Cranbrook/Canadian Rockies International Airport
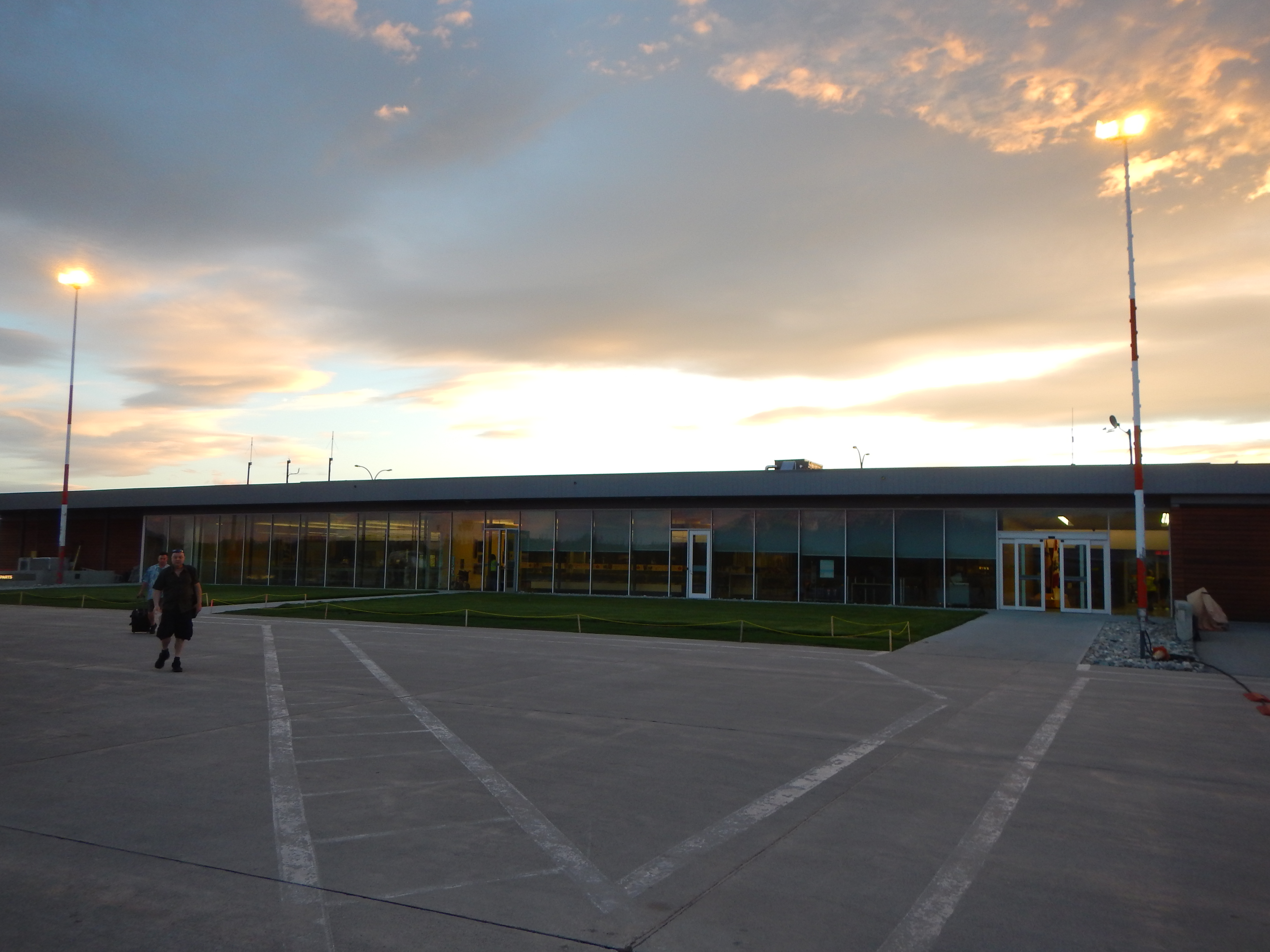
- Terminal building at YXC (2016)
- IATA: YXC; ICAO: CYXC; WMO: 71880

Summary
- Airport type: Public
- Owner: City of Cranbrook
- Operator: Elevate Airports
- Location: Cranbrook, British Columbia
- Time zone: MST (UTC−07:00)
  - Summer (DST): MDT (UTC−06:00)
- Elevation AMSL: 3,084 ft (940 m)
- Coordinates: 49°36′44″N 115°46′55″W
- Website: FlyYXC

Map
- Location in British Columbia CYXC (Canada)

Runways
Direction	Length		Surface
Direction	ft	m	Surface
16/34	8,000	2,438	Asphalt

Statistics (2024)
- Passengers: 152,100
- Sources: DestinationBC; Canada Flight Supplement; Environment and Climate Change Canada; Movements from Statistics Canada

Cranbrook/Canadian Rockies International Airport (IATA: YXC, ICAO: CYXC) is an airport in British Columbia, located 5 nautical miles (9.3 km; 5.8 mi) north of Cranbrook and 20 km (12 mi) south-east of Kimberley, in the Canadian Rockies.

It is owned by the City of Cranbrook and operated by Elevate Airports. There is a single 8,000 by 150 ft (2,438 by 46 m) asphalt runway, 16/34, with a category 1 instrument landing system capable of guiding aircraft down to 200 ft (61 m) in 1/2 mi (0.80 km) of visibility. The terminal building covers 2,100 m^{2} (23,000 sq ft). In 2008, YXC served over 106,277 passengers and in 2010 had 15,060 aircraft movements. In 2017 YXC served 134,455 passengers, peaked in 2018 serving 184,973 passengers and in 2022 has rebounded from a low of 56,901 passengers during the COVID-19 pandemic to serve 138,700 passengers, a 145% increase year over year from 2021. The airport is operated 24 hours a day by the Cranbrook Flight Service Station.

It is classified as an airport of entry by Transport Canada and is staffed by the Canada Border Services Agency (CBSA). CBSA officers at this airport can handle general aviation aircraft only, with no more than 15 passengers.

== Airlines and destinations ==
Airlines	Destinations
Air Canada Express	Vancouver
Pacific Coastal Airlines	Kelowna
WestJet Encore	Calgary, Vancouver

== Accidents and incidents ==
On 11 February 1978 Flight 314, a Boeing 737, operated by Pacific Western Airlines on a scheduled flight from Edmonton, via Calgary and Cranbrook, to West Kootenay Regional Airport, then known as Castlegar Airport crashed at Cranbrook Airport. The Boeing 737-200 Series aircraft crashed after thrust reversers did not fully stow following a rejected landing that was executed in order to avoid a snowplow. The crash killed 42 of the 49 people on board.

== Pictures ==
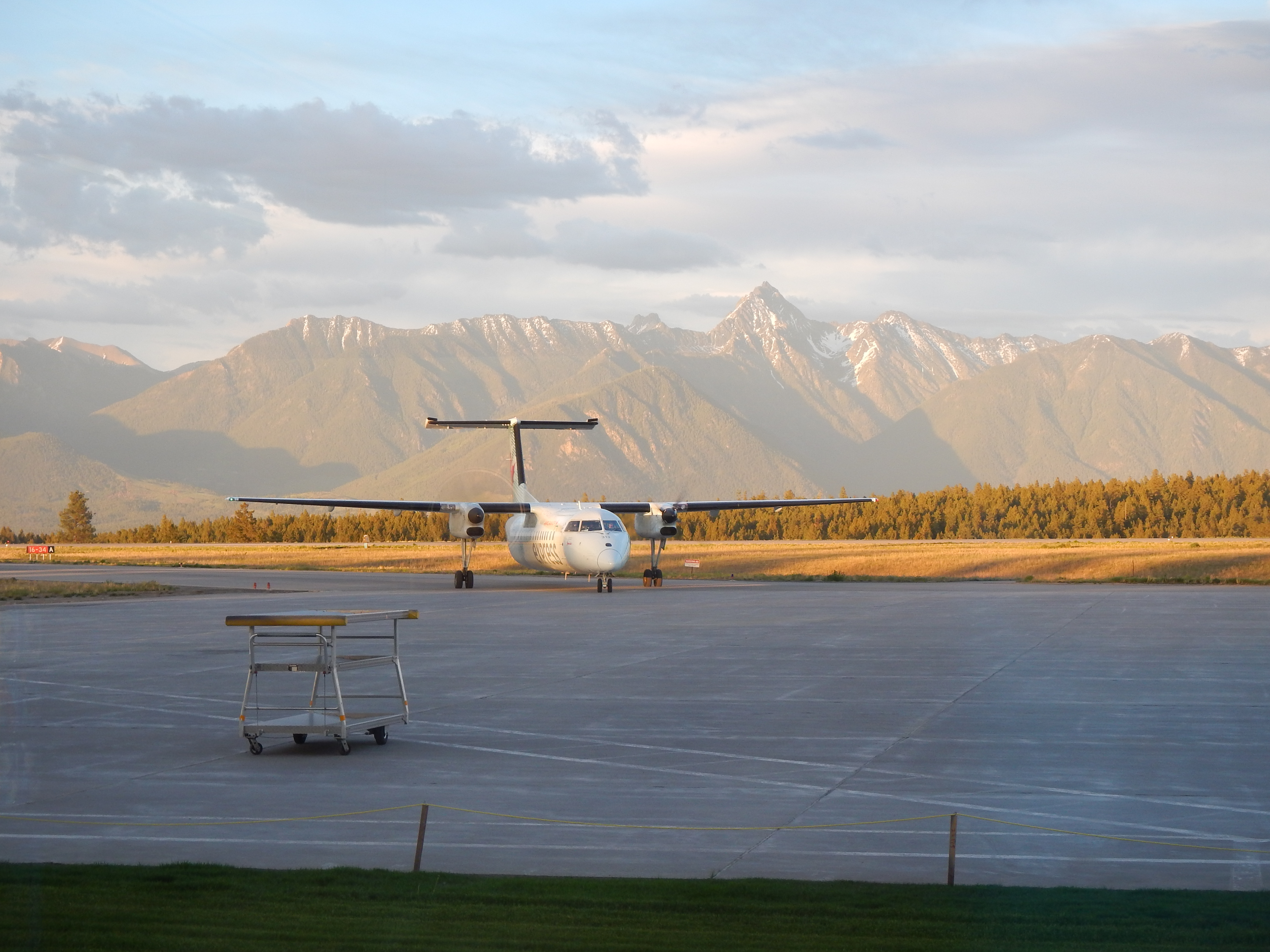
An Air Canada Express Dash 8-Q300 taxiing up to the terminal

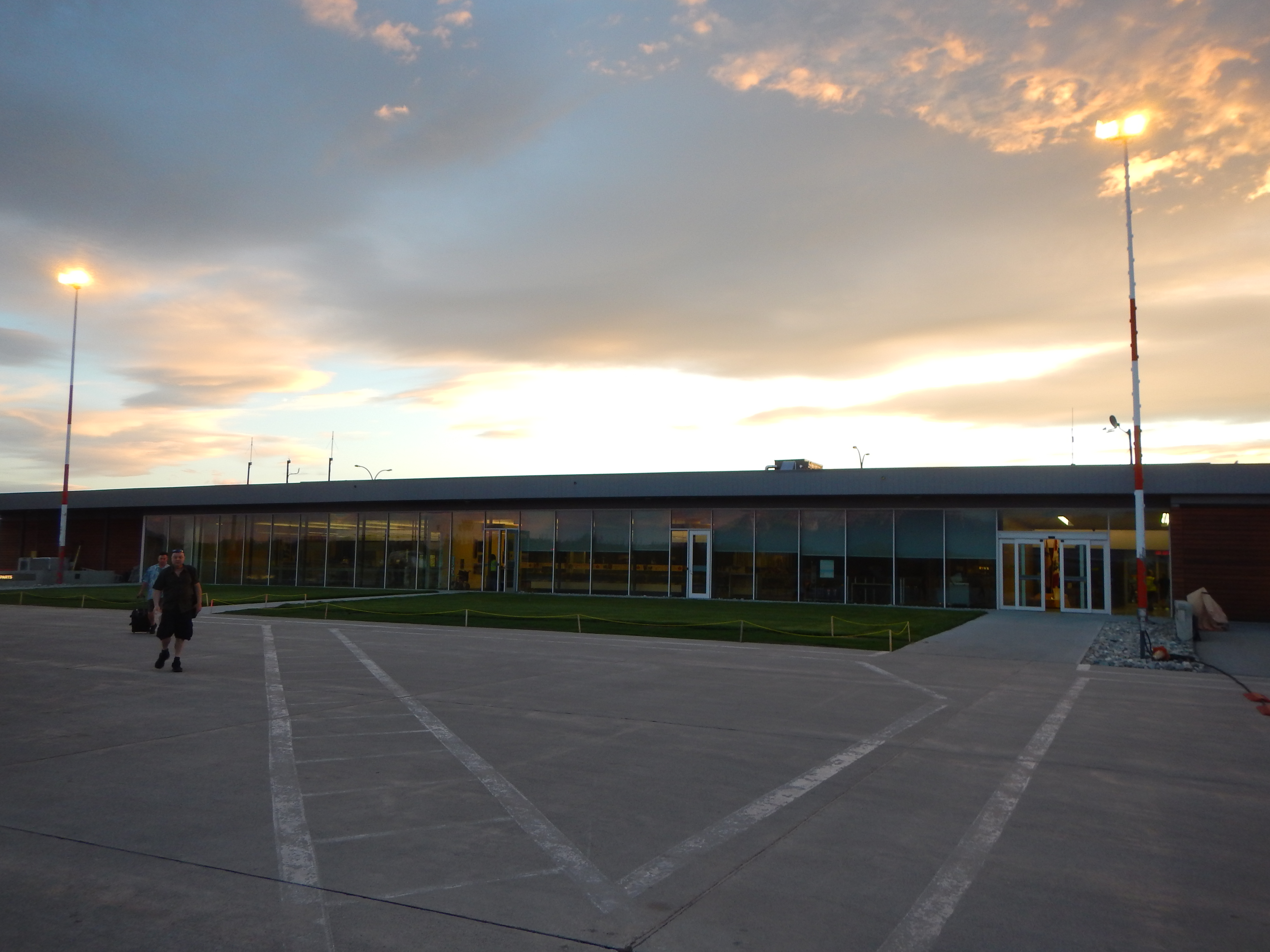
The main part of the terminal

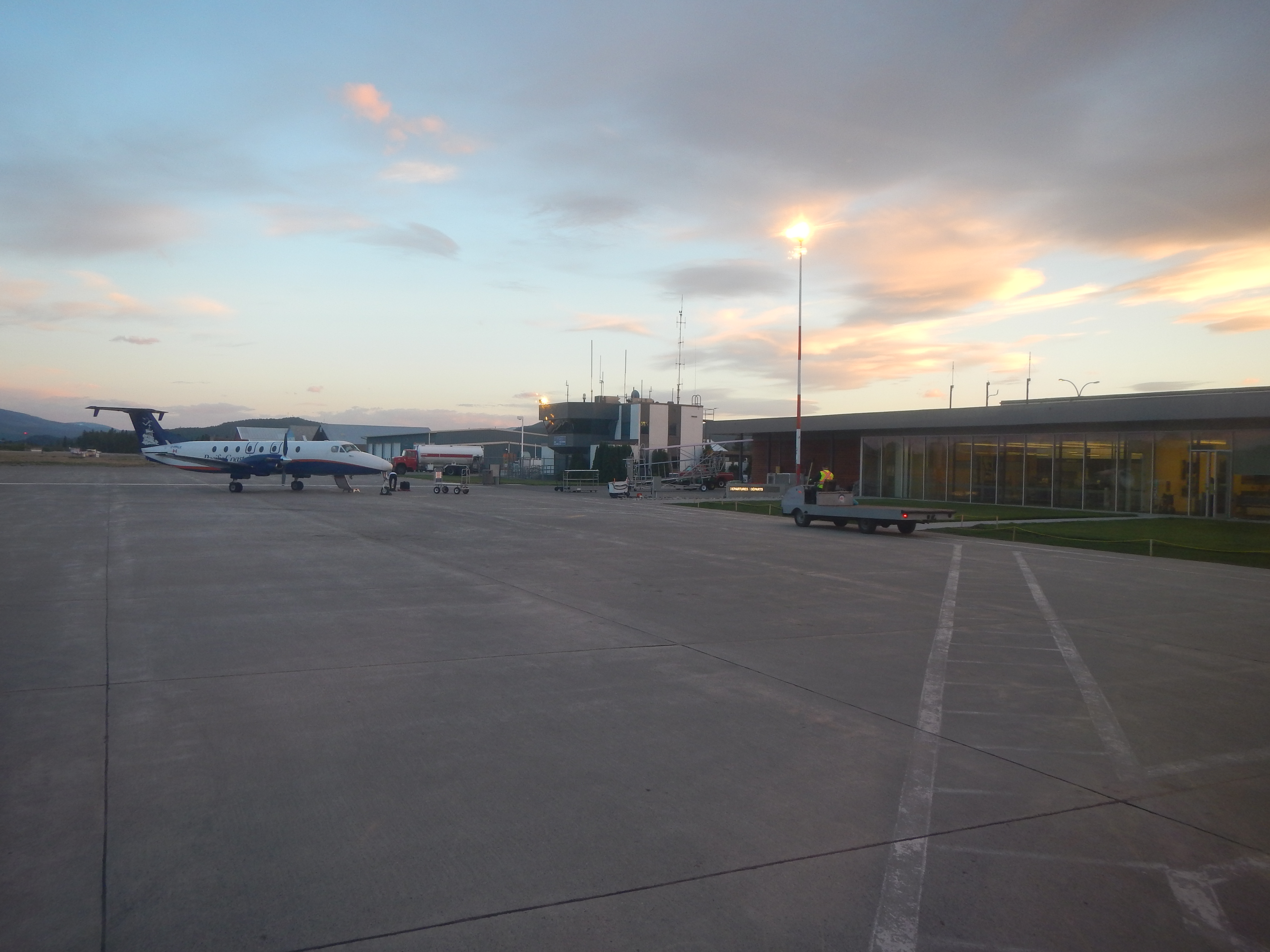
The tower

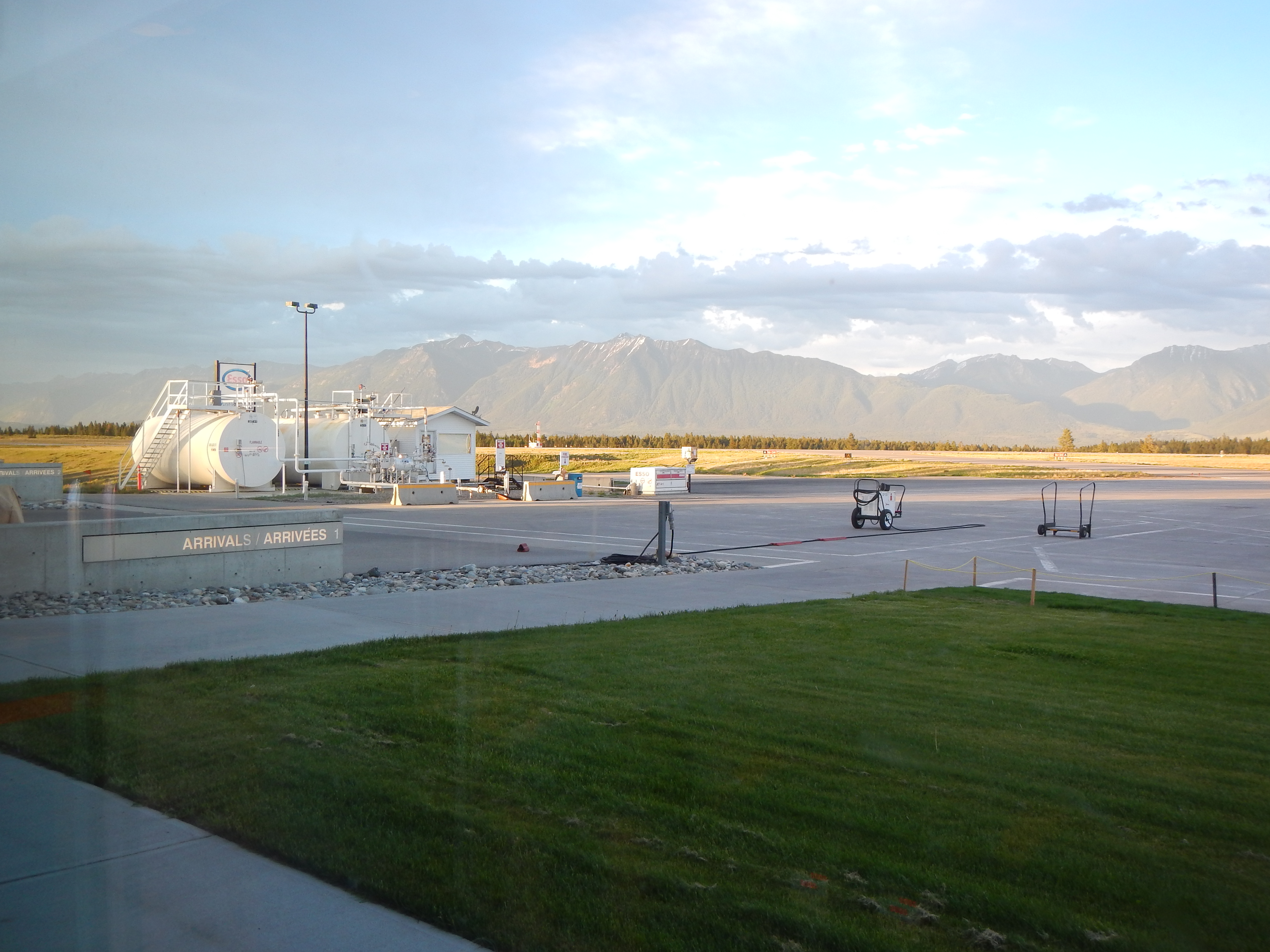
Fuel at the airport

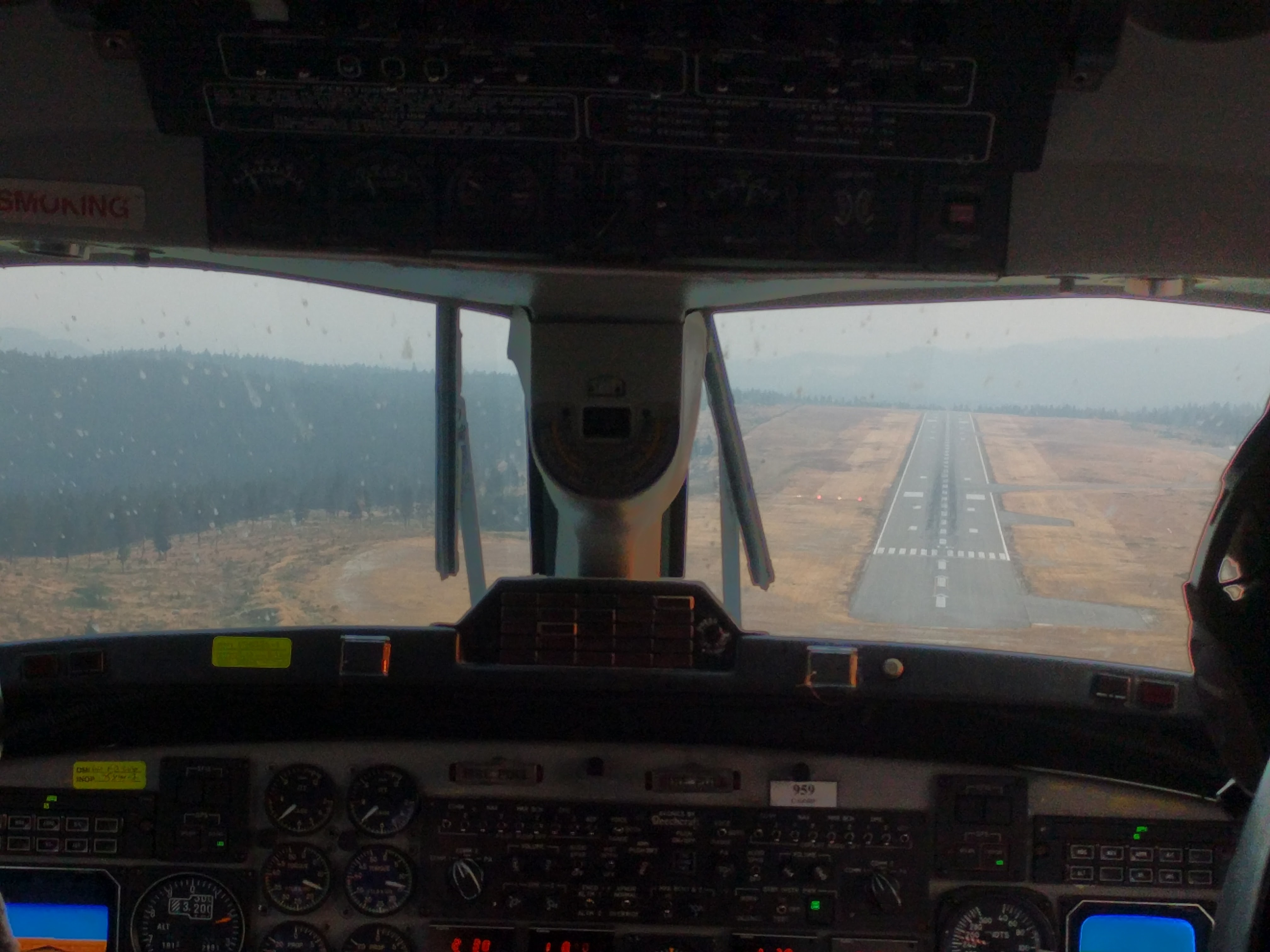
Approach coming from the north

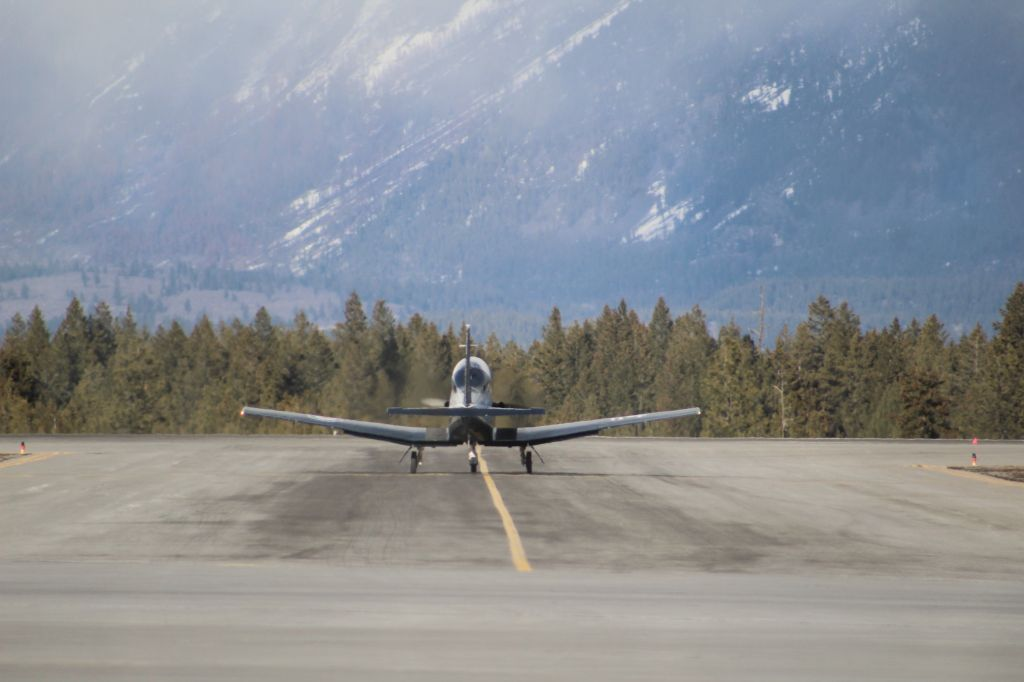
CT-115 Hawk taxiing along taxiway alpha
