= Nanaimo Airport =

Regional airport in British Columbia, Canada

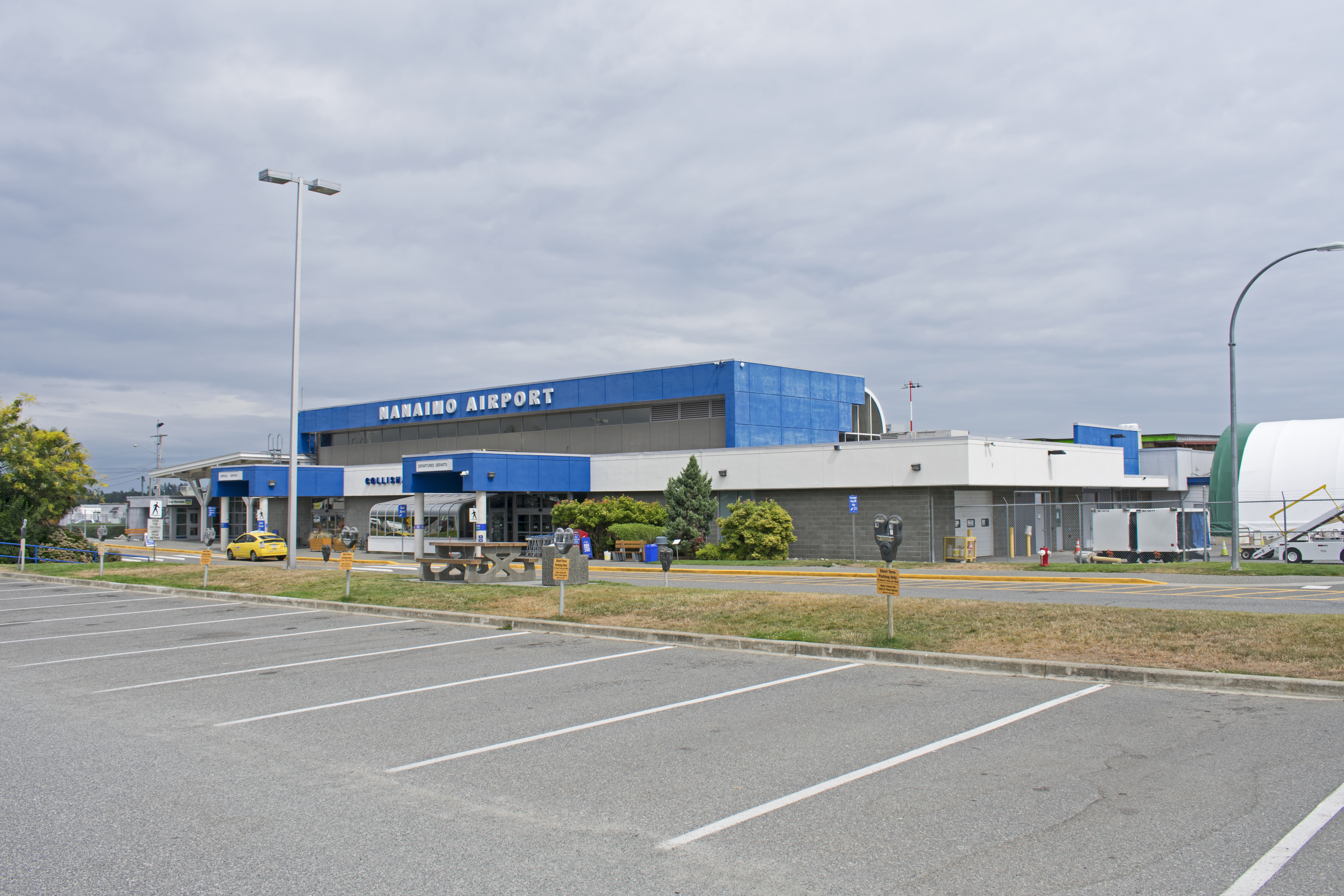
- IATA: YCD; ICAO: CYCD; WMO: 71890

Summary
- Airport type: Public
- Operator: Nanaimo Airport Commission
- Location: Nanaimo
- Time zone: MST (UTC−07:00)
- Elevation AMSL: 92 ft (28 m)
- Coordinates: 49°03′16″N 123°52′12″W
- Website: ycd.ca

Map
- Location in British Columbia CYCD (Canada)

Runways
Direction	Length		Surface
Direction	ft	m	Surface
16/34	6,602	2,012	Grooved asphalt

Statistics (2024)
- Aircraft movements: 24,587
- Number of passengers: 359,525
- Sources: Canada Flight Supplement; Environment Canada; Aircraft movements from Statistics Canada; Number of passengers from ycd.ca

Nanaimo Airport (IATA: YCD, ICAO: CYCD) is a privately owned and operated regional airport located 7 nautical miles (13 km; 8.1 mi) south southeast of Nanaimo, British Columbia, Canada.

In 1999, the air terminal was named in honour of World War I ace Raymond Collishaw who was born in Nanaimo. The Nanaimo-Collishaw Air Terminal is the passenger terminal for the airport.

The Nanaimo Airport currently has only one available runway for instrument flight rules (IFR) conditions, runway 16. This is because the approach to the north-facing runway (runway 34) is a dogleg approach that follows the Ladysmith Harbour.

== Expansion ==
In 2010, the Nanaimo Airport Commission announced the completion of a significant runway expansion. The runway length increased by almost 1,600 ft (490 m) to accommodate larger aircraft, as well as the addition of a third taxiway (labelled Charlie), to allow direct access to the threshold of runway 16.

Shortly after the runway expansion, Nanaimo Airport saw an increase in commercial traffic because of the subsequent installation of an advanced instrument landing system (ILS) and associated lighting on the south-facing runway 16. This would soon attract the likes of WestJet Encore and Air Canada Rouge among the existing services offered by Jazz Aviation.

Between April 2018 and February 2020, a major terminal expansion took place, increasing the terminal's screening capacity from 100 passengers per hour to 1,000 passengers per hour. The apron was also expanded to compensate for the 60% size increase of the new terminal building.

The air terminal saw 435,000 passengers pass through its gates in 2018.

== Airlines and destinations ==
Nanaimo Airport provides service to Vancouver, Calgary, Kelowna, and seasonally to Edmonton via Air Canada Express, Pacific Coastal Airlines, WestJet, and WestJet Encore.

Air Canada did not renew its seasonal Toronto service for 2026.

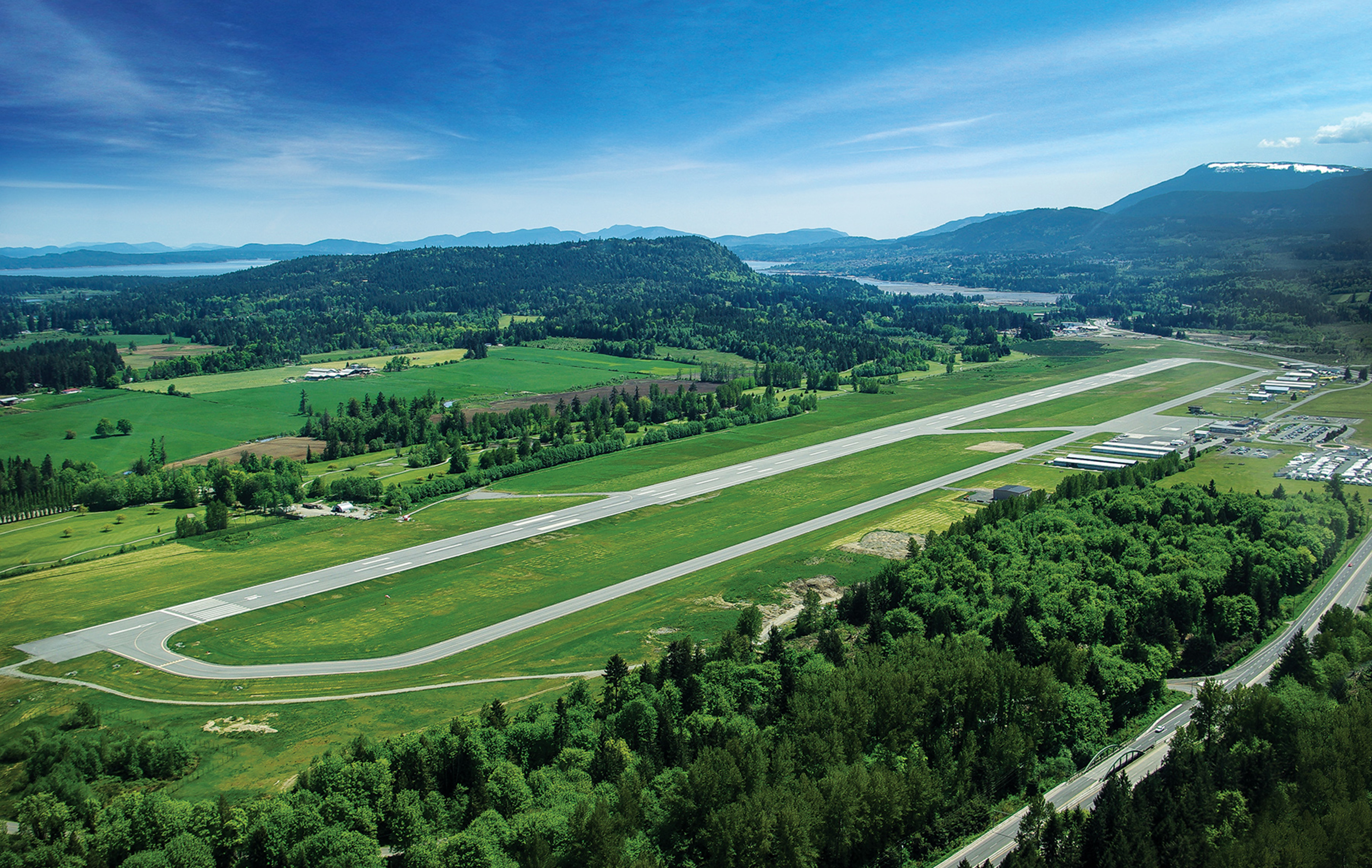
Looking South from the Northwest side of the field, featuring the expanded runway 16/34 and new taxiway 'charlie'

=== Passenger ===
Airlines	Destinations
Air Canada Express	Vancouver
Pacific Coastal Airlines	Kelowna, Vancouver
WestJet	Calgary
WestJet Encore	Calgary, Vancouver; Seasonal: Edmonton

== Statistics ==
=== Annual traffic ===
Annual passenger traffic
Year	Passengers	% change
2019	491,499	▲10.0%
2020	174,287	▼64.6%
2021	193,425	▲11.0%
2022	338,016	▲74.8%
2023	377,454	▲11.7%
2024	359,525	▼5.0%

== See also ==
- Nanaimo Harbour Water Aerodrome
- List of airports on Vancouver Island
