= WestJet Encore =

Regional airline of Canada

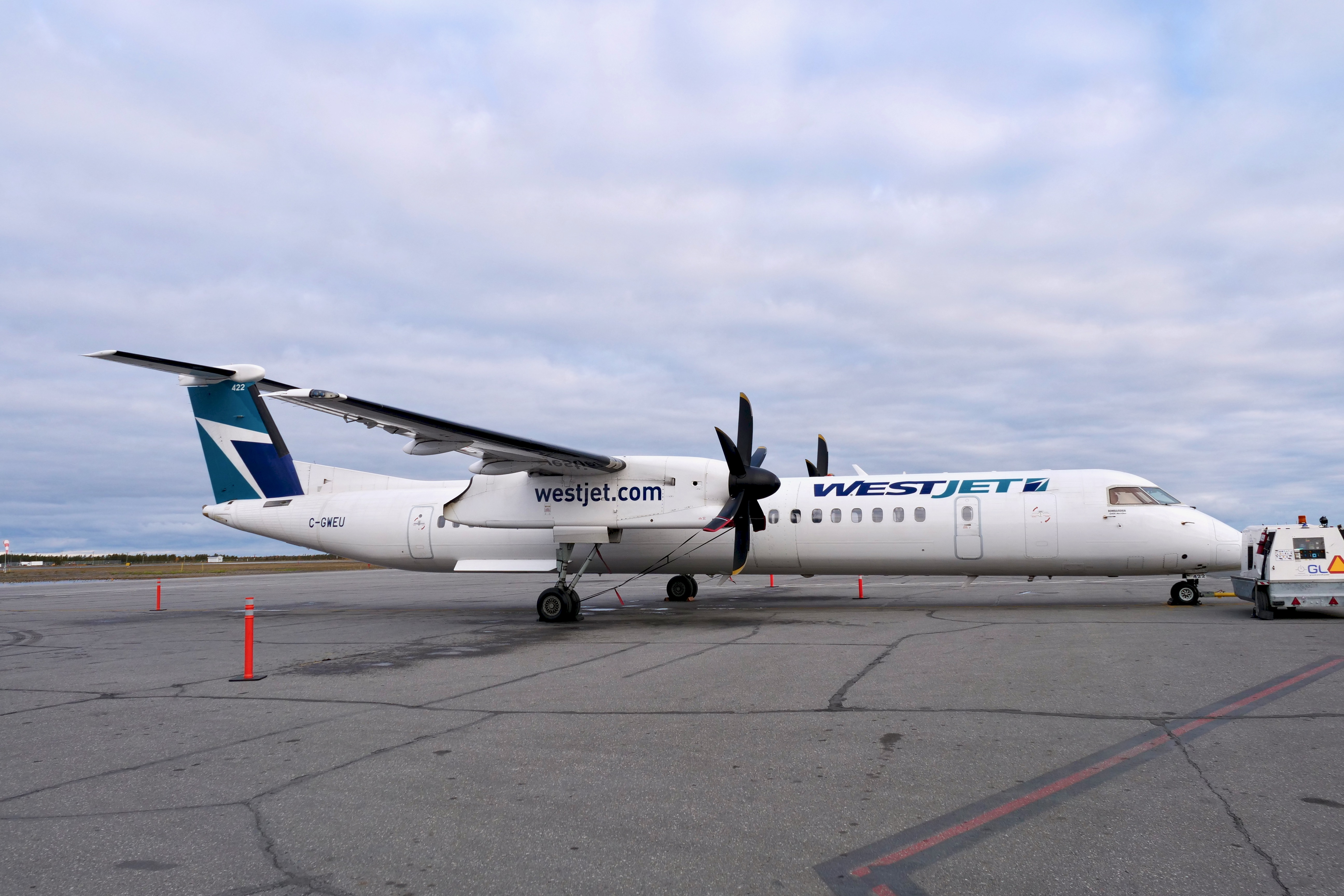
- A Bombardier Q400 at Yellowknife Airport
IATA	ICAO	Call sign
WR	WEN	ENCORE
- Commenced operations: June 24, 2013; 13 years ago
- AOC #: Canada 17903, United States 5WJF451F
- Hubs: Calgary
- Frequent-flyer program: WestJet Rewards
- Fleet size: 35 / 39
- Parent company: WestJet Airlines, Ltd.
- Headquarters: Calgary, Alberta, Canada
- Website: www.westjet.com/encore

WestJet Encore is a Canadian regional airline headquartered in Calgary, Alberta, that operates flights for WestJet, owned by the same parent company WestJet Airlines, Ltd.

WestJet Encore was formed in 2013 to allow the increased frequency of flights using smaller aircraft and to expand service to routes with less traffic, following internal market studies about future growth limitations by WestJet Airlines operating only Boeing 737 aircraft. Originally launching as a feeder airline for the mainline WestJet network out of WestJet hubs in Calgary and Toronto (and providing other regional and commuter flights, e.g. Halifax to Sydney, Nova Scotia or Edmonton to Kelowna), the airline's service was refocused on Western Canada in 2021, with all service east of Thunder Bay discontinued.

The airline has operated up to a fleet of 41 De Havilland Canada Dash 8 Q400 NextGen aircraft. The airline was initially staffed with non-union employees, but the pilots and cabin crew have since unionized. Crew bases are maintained in Calgary and Toronto, with all Toronto-based crew members requiring deadheading to access the route network in Western Canada. WestJet Encore participates in the WestJet Rewards, a revenue-based frequent flyer program that offers flight discount rewards.

== History ==
=== Market conditions leading to formation (2005–2013) ===
Prior to the formation of WestJet Encore, WestJet internal studies concluded in 2005 that WestJet would saturate the Canadian commercial airline market when it reached a 90–100 Boeing 737 aircraft fleet. Westjet had 50 Boeing 737 aircraft at the time. WestJet Airlines became the second-largest airline in Canada in 2002. Solutions included slowing expansion of the airline or adding smaller aircraft models to serve routes with less traffic. The absence of turboprop aircraft in the WestJet fleet was seen as a disadvantage compared to competitor Air Canada. In some cases Air Canada had more frequent flights on smaller aircraft while WestJet either avoided the market or had only one daily flight on a larger Boeing 737 aircraft.

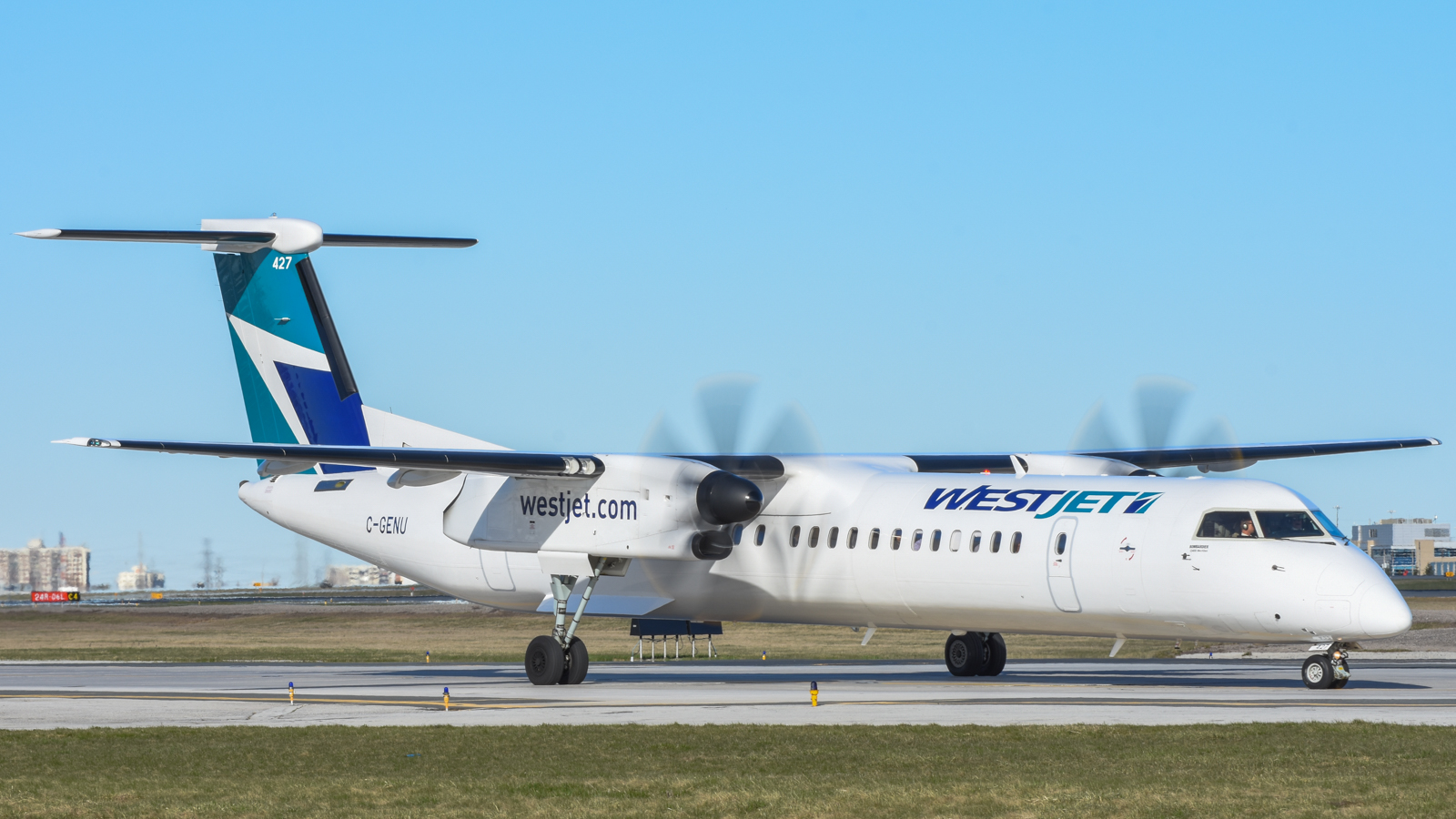
WestJet Encore De Havilland Q400 NextGen displaying 2013–2015 livery

WestJet made an initial order of 20 Bombardier Q400 NextGen (now De Havilland Q400 NextGen) aircraft through a letter of intent on May 1, 2012, which resulted in a conditional order on June 28, 2012. A firm order of 20 Q400 NextGen and 25 options was announced on August 1, 2012. The ATR72-600, had been considered, having a lower initial acquisition price and better fuel economy on short flights but slower speed, worse fuel economy on longer flights and slightly less passenger capacity.

=== Inauguration of air service and operating conditions ===
The parent company, WestJet Airlines, Ltd., formed WestJet Encore as a wholly owned, but legally separate, airline from WestJet. Prior to the selection of the Encore name, other names were considered, including Chinook, Echo, and Reach. Calgary was selected for the WestJet Encore corporate headquarters but Toronto Pearson International Airport was also considered. WestJet Encore received an Air Operator Certificate separate from WestJet Airlines on June 12, 2013.

On June 24, 2013, Westjet Encore service began with two Q400s between Calgary International Airport and Saskatoon, Nanaimo (British Columbia), and Fort St. John (British Columbia) as well as between Fort. St. John and Vancouver. The International Air Transport Association, IATA, assigned WestJet Encore an airline code of "WR".

Some WestJet Encore flights were new routes not served by the WestJet mainline carrier because there was insufficient traffic to support Boeing 737 flights. Other WestJet Encore flights increased frequencies on existing WestJet routes. WestJet Encore's service was initially limited to Western Canada, but in June 2014, the airline opened service in Ontario between Toronto and Thunder Bay. It later began service on eastern routes centred on Toronto and Halifax, since discontinued. WestJet Encore moved into the international market in 2016, with flights serving Boston Logan Airport; Nashville International Airport was added the following year.

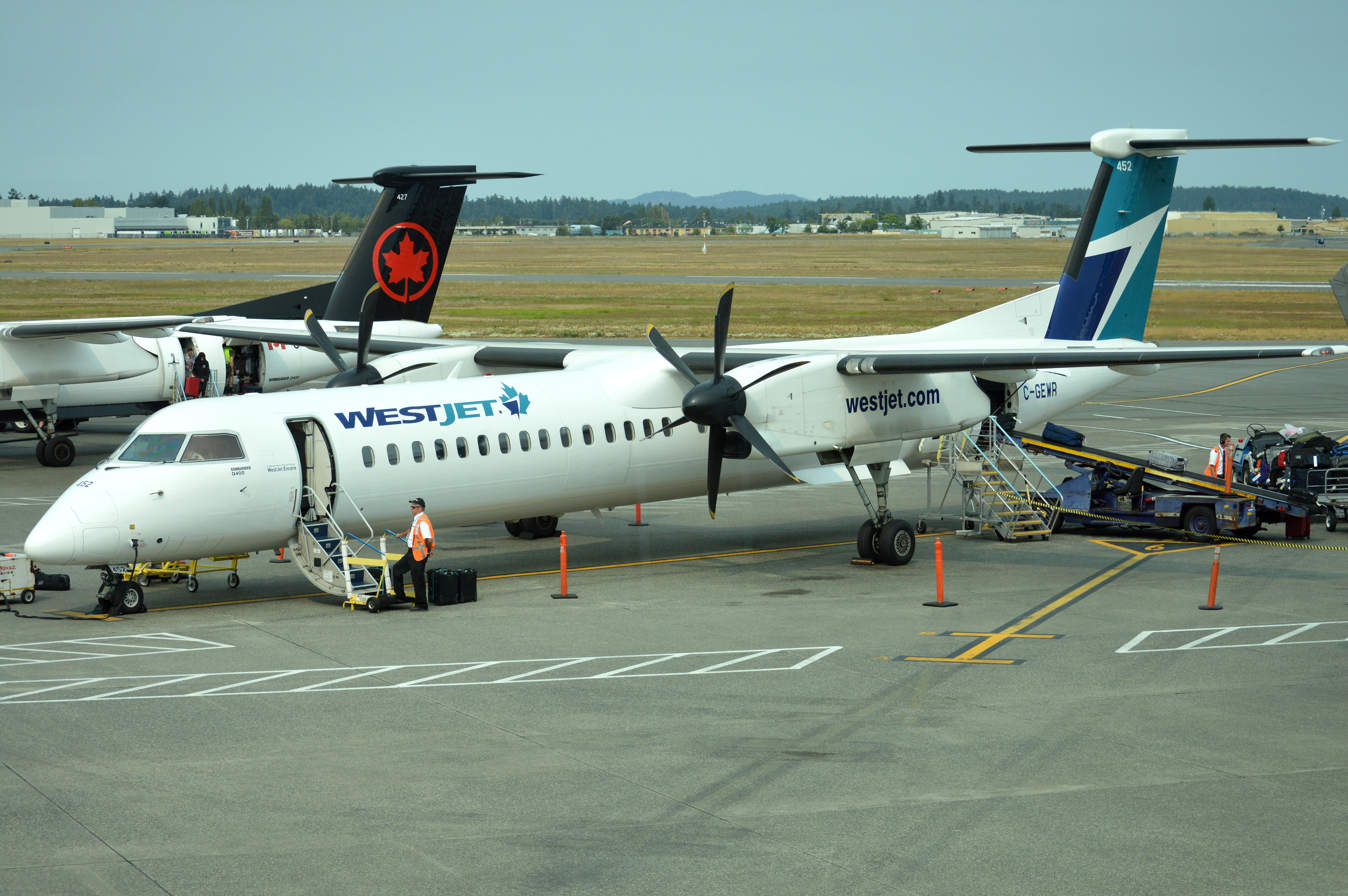
WestJet Encore De Havilland Q400 displaying the 2015 revised livery

WestJet Encore flies Q400 NextGen on regional flights up to 700 nautical miles. 50% of WestJet Encore passengers are travelling on connecting flights with WestJet. The WestJet Encore fleet of Q400s expanded to 18 aircraft by March 2015, and later to 34 aircraft by December 2016 and to 43 aircraft by December 2017. In 2015, WestJet Encore was the fastest-growing operator of Q400 aircraft. By 2017, it was the fourth largest operator of Q400 aircraft in the world.

In August 2015, WestJet Encore adopted a revised livery. The tail and type style used with the word "WestJet" remained the same, but the teal-and-blue geometric widget ahead of the WestJet titles was replaced with a teal-and-blue stylized maple leaf of a similar pattern.

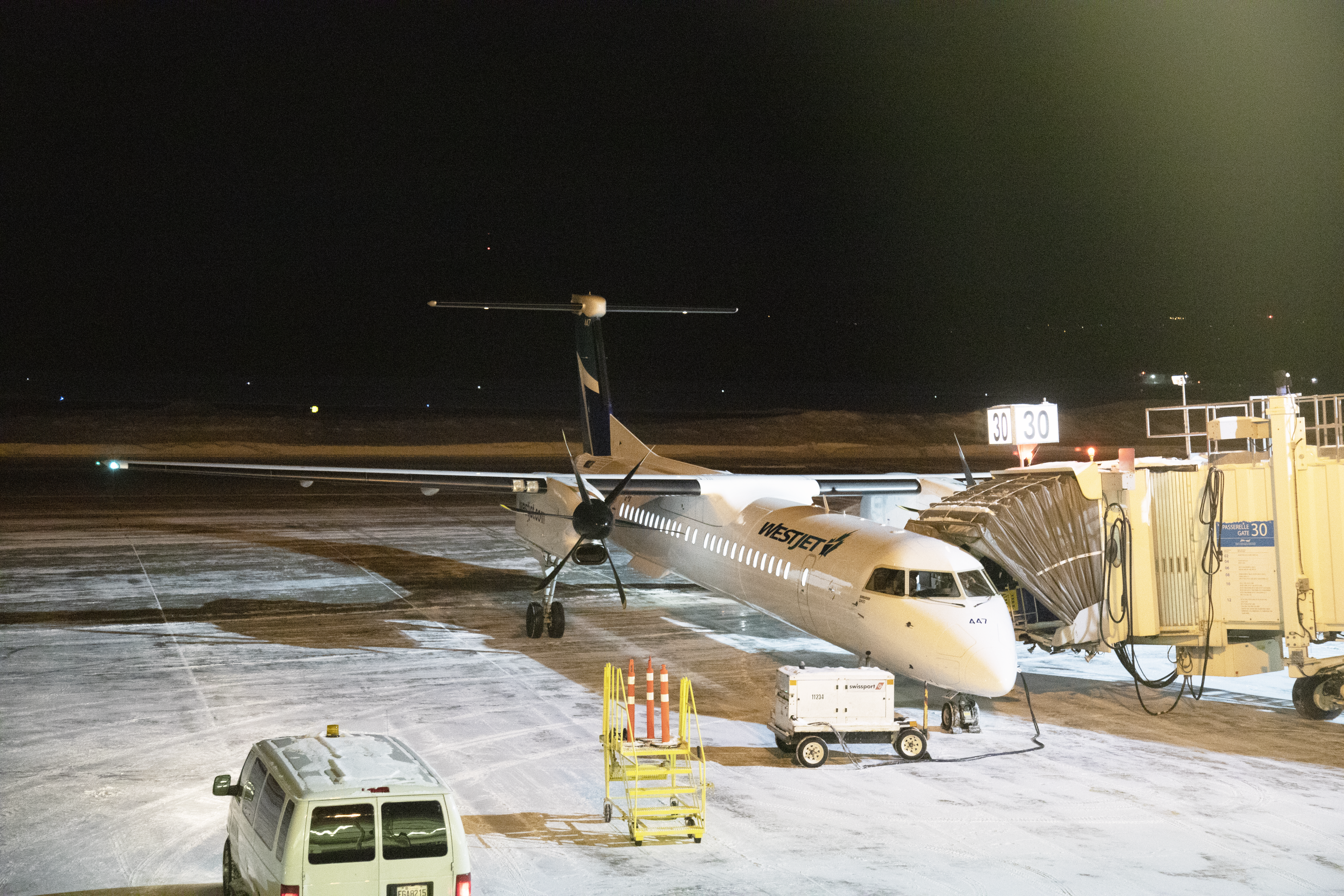
WestJet Encore De Havilland Dash 8-Q400 at Québec City Jean Lesage International Airport

WestJet Encore has a partially unionized workforce. Initially having an entirely non-union staff, the airline became a target for union drives starting in 2014. Starting January 1, 2016, the airline management initiated WestJet Pilots Association, a subgroup of the WestJet Proactive Management Team, to ratify pilot contracts between with WestJet Encore. The pilots union which represents many pilots that fly for U.S. carriers, the Air Line Pilots Association, was successful in unionizing the 500-pilot workforce in November 2017. A pilot base is located in Calgary. WestJet pilots are required to be Canadian citizens or Canadian permanent residents. Pilot shortages in the airline industry affected WestJet Encore in 2018, resulting in requirements that newly hired pilots needed only 1,000 flight hours of experience prior to hiring. Pilots are guaranteed an eventual higher paying position flying larger jets at WestJet, unlike competitor airline Jazz, which operates as Air Canada Express and does not offer guarantees of an eventual job at Air Canada. WestJet Encore and its flight attendants reached an agreement regarding compensation and work rules beginning January 1, 2018, for a one-year period. However, the Canadian Union of Public Employees (CUPE), which was not a party to the agreement, announced that it would continue efforts to unionize the flight attendant ranks.

On October 31, 2016, a $2 billion, two million square foot international terminal for U.S. cross border and international flights opened at Calgary International Airport, the largest hub of WestJet Encore and its affiliate WestJet. Despite consultation with the airlines, the terminal design proved problematic. The Calgary Airport Authority CEO characterized the new terminal as being "long on aesthetics and short on functionality." There is reduced aircraft efficiency due to the need to tow aircraft to another concourse if an aircraft is used for both domestic and either U.S. cross border or international flights as well as the need to hire additional staff because they cannot be deployed to more than one concourse due to long walking distances. The baggage system of the new terminal is inoperable with the rest of the airport from 2016 to 2019. Passenger problems include WestJet trans-border and international gates being up to a two-kilometre walk to the domestic WestJet gates as well as lack of enough seating at the gate so passengers sit on the floor. These problems are seen as a threat to passenger traffic, which might be driven to other connecting airports, such as Seattle or Vancouver, cities that WestJet Encore has fewer or no flights serving.

In 2022, amid a broader post-pandemic restructuring for the entirety of the WestJet Group, CEO Alexis von Hoensbroech announced that WestJet would be refocusing its efforts on Western Canada.

In August 2026, Westjet flight attendants conducted a strike but Westjet Encore flights were not affected.

== Corporate affairs ==
=== Management ===
WestJet Encore is a wholly owned company of WestJet Airlines, Ltd. Sales and marketing of WestJet Encore flights are conducted by WestJet, An Alberta Partnership, which is jointly owned by two corporate entities owned by WestJet Airlines, Ltd.

The first president of WestJet Encore was Ferio Pugliese, who retained his title of executive vice president at WestJet Airlines, Ltd. He was hired in November 2012 coming from WestJet, where he began work in 2007. He left in 2016 to become an executive vice president at Hydro One Ltd., an electricity company and in 2018 subsequently he is now a senior vice-president for Air Canada. He was replaced in September 2016 by Charles Duncan, an American who previously worked as senior vice president of technical operations at United Airlines and, earlier in his career, was Chief Operating Officer at Continental Micronesia.

In 2018, John Aaron was named vice-president and general manager, WestJet Encore, reporting to the executive vice-president and chief operations officer at Westjet, representing an organizational restructure. Lisa Davis was the Vice-President and General Manager of WestJet Encore in 2022.

=== Business figures ===
Financial statistics are not released separately for WestJet Encore but reported for WestJet Airlines, Ltd., which comprises several units and the larger WestJet Airlines.

== Cabins and services ==
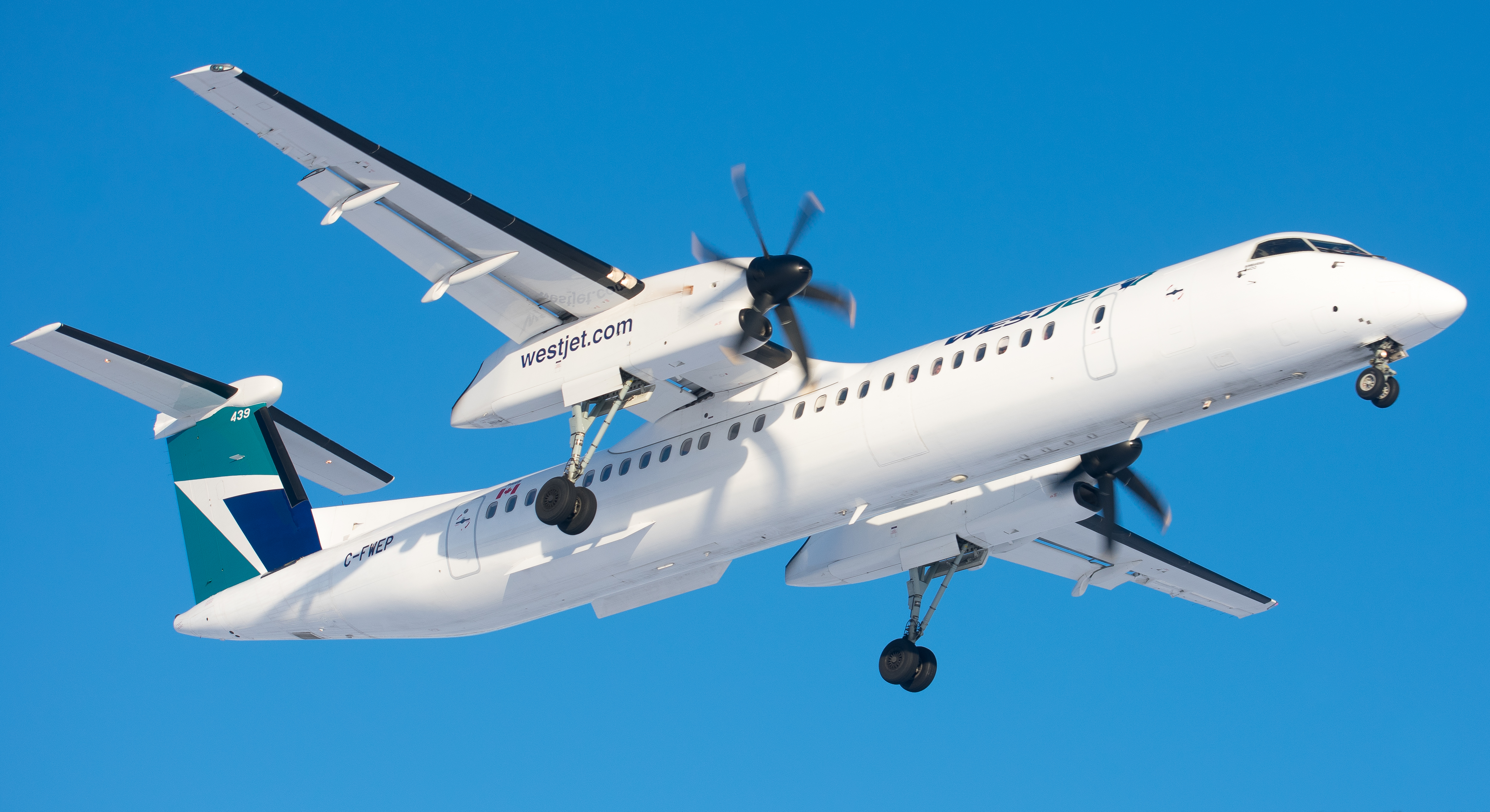
WestJet Encore De Havilland Canada Dash 8-400 NextGen with landing gear extended.

WestJet Encore aircraft has a designated premium economy section in addition to economy class seating called Premium. Unlike the Premium section on the mainline carrier, WestJet, it does not have increased legroom. The Premium section on WestJet Encore has seating in the forward part of the cabin and does not have change fees when changing flights ticketed. WestJet Encore aircraft do not have drop down oxygen masks, which are not required by regulations due to the aircraft's certification to operate up to 25,000 feet in altitude. To prevent freezing of water lines during overnight stays at airports with cold weather, the airline rendered the water flow to the lavatory basins inoperative in 2013.

WestJet Encore does not operate airport lounges. Westjet Encore has arrangements with private, non-airline affiliated airport lounges where WestJet Encore passengers are extended a discount for pay-for-visit use.

=== Marketing ===
WestJet Encore participates in WestJet Rewards, a frequent flyer program and loyalty scheme originally started by WestJet. WestJet Rewards participants also include Air France (2017–present), KLM (2017–present), Delta Air Lines (2014–present), and Qantas (2016–present), as well as other partners, such as certain car rental companies and hotels. WestJet Dollars earned as a base amount do not expire but bonus amounts have an expiry date. Passengers flying on WestJet Encore may alternatively receive credit in Air France/KLM Flying Blue, Delta Skymiles, or Qantas Frequent Flyer.

== Destinations ==
WestJet Encore flies regional routes throughout Canada, primarily to or from Calgary. Routes include smaller cities, such as Brandon, Manitoba to Calgary, two cities with an oil industry. This new service re-introduced air service to Brandon. Other routes are increased frequencies on existing WestJet routes, such as between Calgary and Saskatoon. WestJet Encore also services transborder routes to the US, including year round service from Calgary to Seattle, and seasonal service from Calgary to Portland, Edmonton to Seattle, as well as service to Delta Air Lines' hub in Minneapolis from Edmonton, Regina and Saskatoon. WestJet Encore flights are numbered as flight 3100 to 3899.

== Fleet ==
WestJet Encore operates one type of aircraft, the Q400NextGen, an updated version of the Dash 8–400 with updated landing gear, redesigned interiors, lighting, and larger overhead cabin storage. In turn, the Dash 8-400 NextGen is an updated version of the De Havilland Canada Dash 8-400 that has active noise suppression to create a quieter passenger cabin.

As of July 20, 2026, WestJet Encore lists 39 aircraft, and has 36 registered with Transport Canada.

WestJet Encore fleet
Aircraft	In service	Passengers			Notes
Aircraft	In service	W	Y	Total	Notes
De Havilland Canada Dash 8 Q400 NextGen	35 / 39	10	68	78	

== See also ==
- WestJet Link
