= KD Air =

Charter airline in Canada

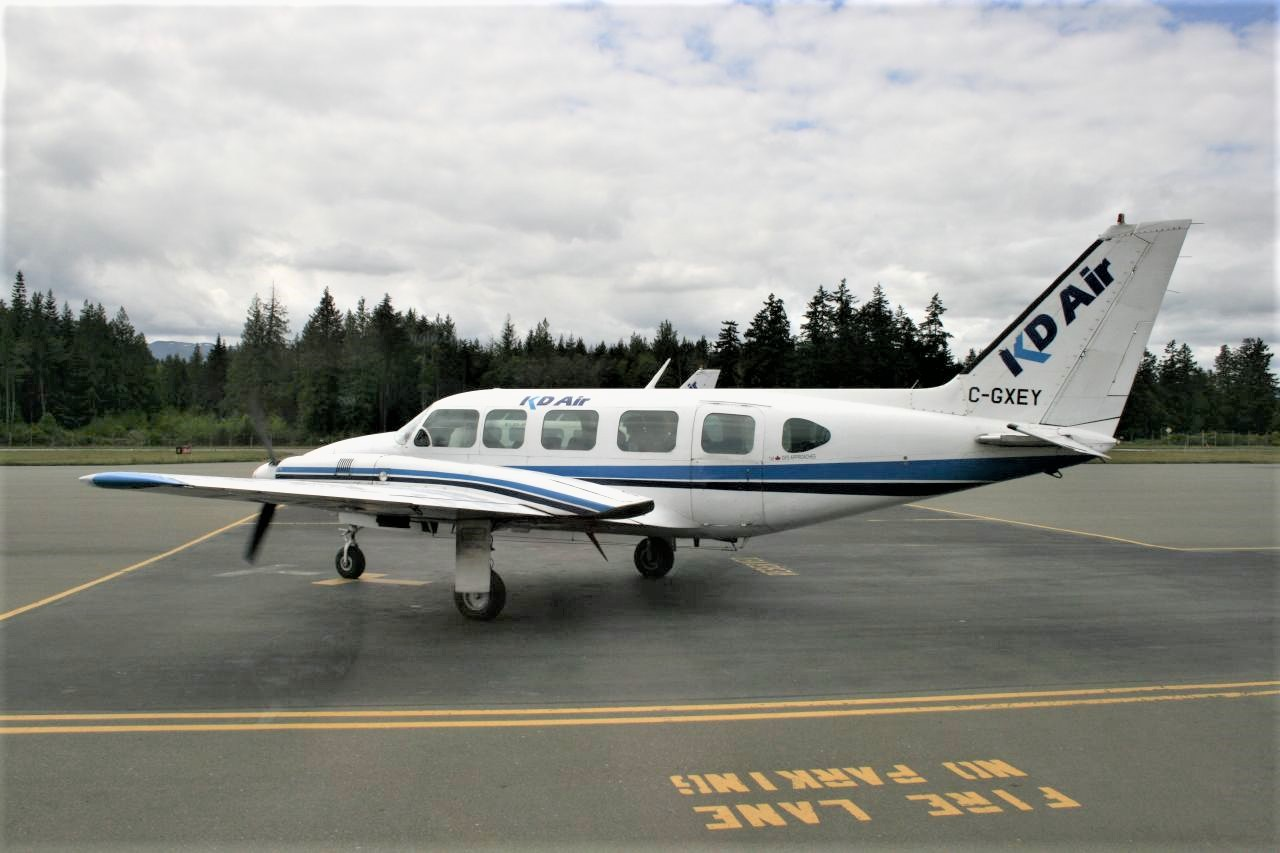
- A Piper PA-31 Navajo at Qualicum Beach Airport
IATA	ICAO	Call sign
-	KDC	KAY DEE
- Founded: 1990
- Ceased operations: 2019
- Hubs: Qualicum Beach (CAT4)
- Focus cities: Vancouver (CYVR)
- Destinations: Vancouver, Qualicum Beach, Tofino, Gillies Bay, Port Alberni
- Parent company: KD Air Corporation
- Headquarters: Qualicum Beach Airport, British Columbia, Canada
- Website: http://www.kdair.com

KD Air Corporation was an airline based in Qualicum Beach, British Columbia, Canada, offering both scheduled and charter service. The airline ceased operations in 2019 and according to Transport Canada the airline currently has no aircraft and no air operator's certificate.

== Destinations ==
KD Air operated daily flights between

- Qualicum Beach
- Vancouver
- Tofino
- Texada Island
- Port Alberni Ground Service from Qualicum Beach.

== Fleet ==
The KD Air fleet consisted of:

- Piper PA-31 Navajo
- Piper PA-31-350 Chieftain
- Piper PA-32-260 Cherokee Six

== See also ==
- History of aviation in Canada
- List of defunct airlines of Canada
