= QBC =

QBC can refer to:

- Quality Bus Corridor
- Quantitative buffy coat, see buffy coat
- Bella Coola Airport

== See also ==
- Pilot report
