= Ginalina =

Canadian folk singer and songwriter

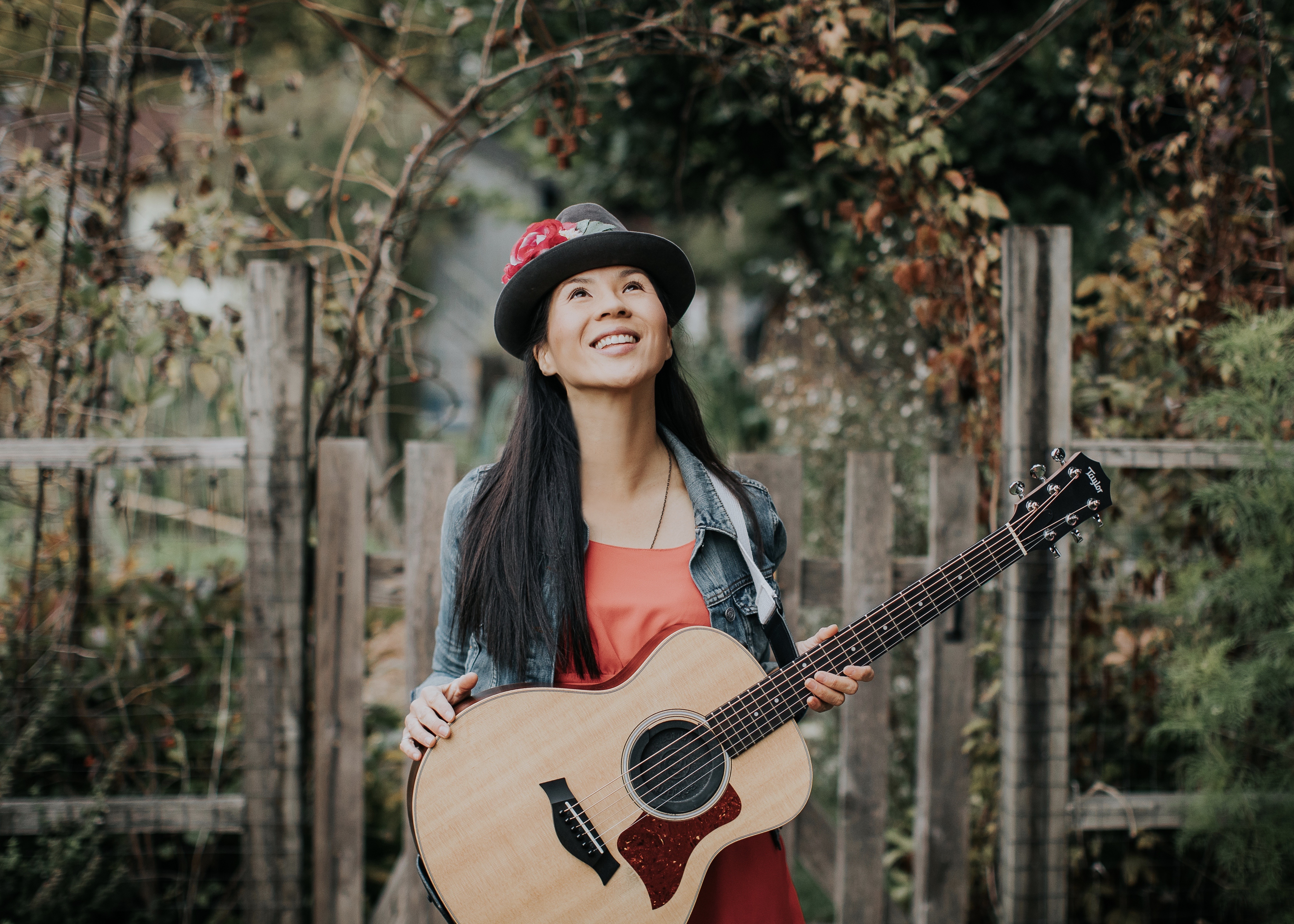
- Ginalina in concert

Background information
- Born: Gina Lin
- Origin: Vancouver, British Columbia, Canada
- Genres: Folk Music; Children's Music; Folk Music
- Instruments: guitar; ukulele; vocals
- Years active: 2016–present
- Label: Independent
- Website: www.ginalinamusic.com

Gina Lam, known professionally as Ginalina, is a Canadian folk music singer, songwriter, children's musician, and children's author.

Her music has received three Juno Awards nominations, four Canadian Folk Music Awards nominations, and two Western Canadian Music Awards. She sings in English, French, Taiwanese, and Mandarin, and her children's song, "Small But Mighty", was featured as part of the CBC Music in the Classroom Challenge among 25 Canadian musicians. She has appeared in festivals, including Folk on the Rocks, Festival du Bois, Bella Coola Music Festival, and Mariposa Folk Festival.

Ginalina's music videos have been aired on Universal Kids's "Get Up and Move", Kidoodle.TV in Canada and the United States, as well as on the Knowledge Network. Books by Ginalina include The Mighty River (2020), the award-winning sequel, The Lively Forest (2021), and the final book in the trilogy, The Blooming Mountain (2022).

== Discography ==
- Going Back: Remembered and Remixed Family Folk Songs, Vol. 1 (2022)
- Small but Mighty (2019)
- It Takes a Village (2018)
- Home is Family (2016)
- Forest Friends' Nature Club (2015)
- Sandcastle Magic (2012)
