= Teara Fraser =

Canadian aviator (born 1971)

Teara Fraser (born 1971) is a Canadian aviator and the founder and CEO of Iskwew Air.

== Biography ==
Teara Fraser was born in Hay River, Northwest Territories. She is a Métis woman of Cree ancestry.

== Career ==
Fraser became a certified commercial pilot in 2002 after experiencing her first small aircraft flight in October 2001.

Fraser founded an aerial survey company in 2010, and sold the company six years later. She returned to entrepreneurship in 2019 with the founding of Iskwew Air, a small airline that offers charter service to remote Indigenous communities in British Columbia, Canada. She chose the name Iskwew - which means "woman" in her ancestral Cree language - in celebration of her Indigenous heritage and of the work of women to fight for gender equality.

In addition to her experience as an aviator and entrepreneur, Fraser founded the Aviation Leadership Foundation, sits on the board of directors of the British Columbia Aviation Council, is a faculty member at Royal Roads University, and was a founder of the Raven Institute and the Lift Collective.

During the COVID-19 pandemic, Fraser and Iskwew Air began supplying essential goods to remote Indigenous communities, such as Alert Bay, that were impacted by the pandemic.

Fraser's story will be included in the DC Comics graphic novel Wonderful Women of History. The story, written by Traci Sorell and illustrated by Natasha Donovan, is set to be published in September 2021.
