= Iskwew Air =

Canadian airline

IATA	CDD	Call sign
—	SG	SWEETGRASS
- Founded: 2018
- Commenced operations: March 8, 2019
- Hubs: Vancouver International Airport
- Fleet size: 3
- Destinations: Vancouver; Qualicum Beach
- Headquarters: Richmond
- Key people: Teara Fraser (CEO
- Employees: 5
- Website: www.iskwew.ca

Iskwew Air is an airline based at Vancouver International Airport, Canada.

== History ==
Iskwew Air was founded in 2018 by Teara Fraser. The airline launched March 2019. Fraser has announced plans to enter the domestic Canadian passenger charter sector, as well as offering a scheduled passenger service.

Iskwew Air promotes itself as a 100% Indigenous- and woman-owned air company. The airline aims to boost accessibility for remote communities across the province, as well as boosting indigenous tourism. All operations will be in cooperation with the Indigenous Tourism Association of Canada.

The airline's first partnership is with Homalco Wildlife & Cultural Tours based in Campbell River, where it will help provide remote nature tours. On August 16, 2021, the airline launch regular scheduled service between Vancouver International Airport South Terminal to Qualicum Beach Airport.

== Fleet ==
As of February 2025, Iskwew Air operated the following aircraft:

Iskwew Air fleet
Aircraft	Total	Orders	Passengers (Economy)
Piper Navajo PA-31-325	1		
Piper Navajo PA-31-350	2		8
Total	3		

== Destinations ==
Destinations in British Columbia as of February 1, 2025:

- Vancouver International Airport
- Qualicum Beach Airport

The airline operates out of Vancouver International Airport, from the South Terminal.
