= Clayton Falls Creek =

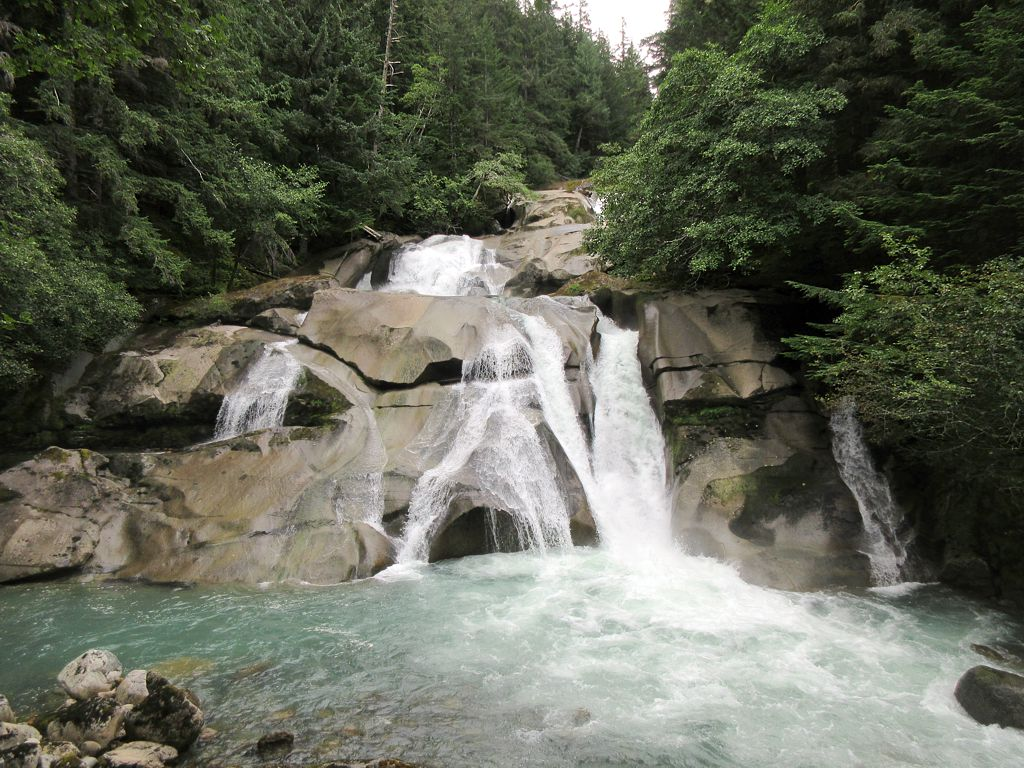
- Clayton Falls

Location
- Country: Canada
- Province: British Columbia
- Regional district: Central Coast

Physical characteristics
- Source: Near Mount Fougner, Pacific Ranges
- Mouth: North Bentinck Arm
  - coordinates: 52°22′16″N 126°48′56″W
- Basin size: 93 km^{2} (36 sq mi)

Clayton Falls Creek is a creek in the Central Coast of British Columbia. It flows through a forested river valley into the North Bentinck Arm about 5 kilometres (3.1 mi) east of the community of Bella Coola. The Clayton Falls Dam, a small concrete gravity dam, is located on the river. Although managed by BC Hydro, it is the only dam in British Columbia not integrated into the agency's integrated hydroelectric system. Clearcut logging devastated the watershed in 1991; the forestland in the basin is now divided into two protected areas — the Clayton Falls Conservancy and the Bella Coola Community Forest.

== Geography and hydrology ==
Clayton Falls Creek has its headwaters near Mount Fougner in the Pacific Ranges. It flows through a river valley until it reaches its highest falls and the nearby Clayton Falls Dam. Before the dam, the stream enters a small headpond around 0.1 hectares (0.25 acres) in area. As it flows through the dam, the stream is split between a 60 m (200 ft) tailrace channel and the 580 m (1,900 ft) penstock, a wood and steel structure running through the dam's powerhouse.

Past the dam, the stream rapidly descends into the North Bentinck Arm. It flows about 100 metres (330 ft) before entering an intertidal reach as it meets the sea. Although short and turbulent, this portion of the creek downstream from the falls forms a spawning area for pink and chum salmon. Its mouth is about 5 km (3.1 mi) west of the community of Bella Coola.

The creek is mainly fed by rainfall, although it receives a large amount of snowmelt during the spring, forming a freshet, and steadily intakes glacial meltwater during the summer. Flow rates are generally lowest in the winter, although this is disrupted by the occasional outbreak of heavy rain, where the creek sees its peak flow.

=== Watershed ===
The Clayton Falls Creek watershed is around 93 km^{2} (36 sq mi) in area. Almost the entirety of the watershed is crown land. The northern half is mainly within the Bella Coola Community Forest, while the southern half is within the Clayton Falls Conservancy, managed by BC Parks. Small amounts of land around the dam are owned by BC Hydro. All of this territory is within the bounds of the Great Bear Rainforest and is subject to additional ecosystem management.

The property owned by BC Hydro at the mouth of the creek has the only public access to the North Bentinck Arm in the vicinity of Bella Coola. It manages a small recreational area at this site, featuring fire pits, a picnic area, and pit toilets. Due to its water access, it is sometimes used as a launch point for canoes, windsurfers, and scuba divers.

== History ==
The river is within the traditional territory of the Nuxalk people. Around 1935, the British Columbia Water Rights Branch named the creek after John Clayton, an early settler of the region and a factor (agent) of the Hudson's Bay Company. This name was given as "Clayton Creek" in the 1930 BC Gazetteer, but the name Clayton Falls Creek was officially adopted in 1953.

In 1991, logging companies clear-cut the Clayton Falls Creek valley as part of a larger campaign of industrial logging in the Bella Coola region. BC Parks formed the southern half of the valley into the Clayton Falls Conservancy in 2008, spanning an area of 5,047 ha (12,470 acres).

=== Dam ===
In 1961 or 1962, the BC Power Commission constructed Clayton Falls Dam, a concrete gravity dam, seeking to reduce the need for diesel fuel in Bella Coola. Initially a 720 kW facility, it was upgraded to a capacity of 2 MW during upgrades in 1992. These reduced its use of costly diesel fuel and redirected the tailrace channel back into the creek itself, as opposed to the North Bentinck Arm. It is the only dam in the province not operated within BC Hydro's integrated hydroelectric system. Due to its negligible headpond storage capacity, it operates as a run-of-river facility.

A 76 mm (3.0 in) diameter water supply line runs from the dam to the Government Wharf and Ice Plant in Bella Coola. This line is closed off in the late fall to prevent damage from freezing. The dam is operated remotely from Bella Coola's Ah-Sin-Heek Diesel Generating Station.
