= Qualicum Beach Airport =

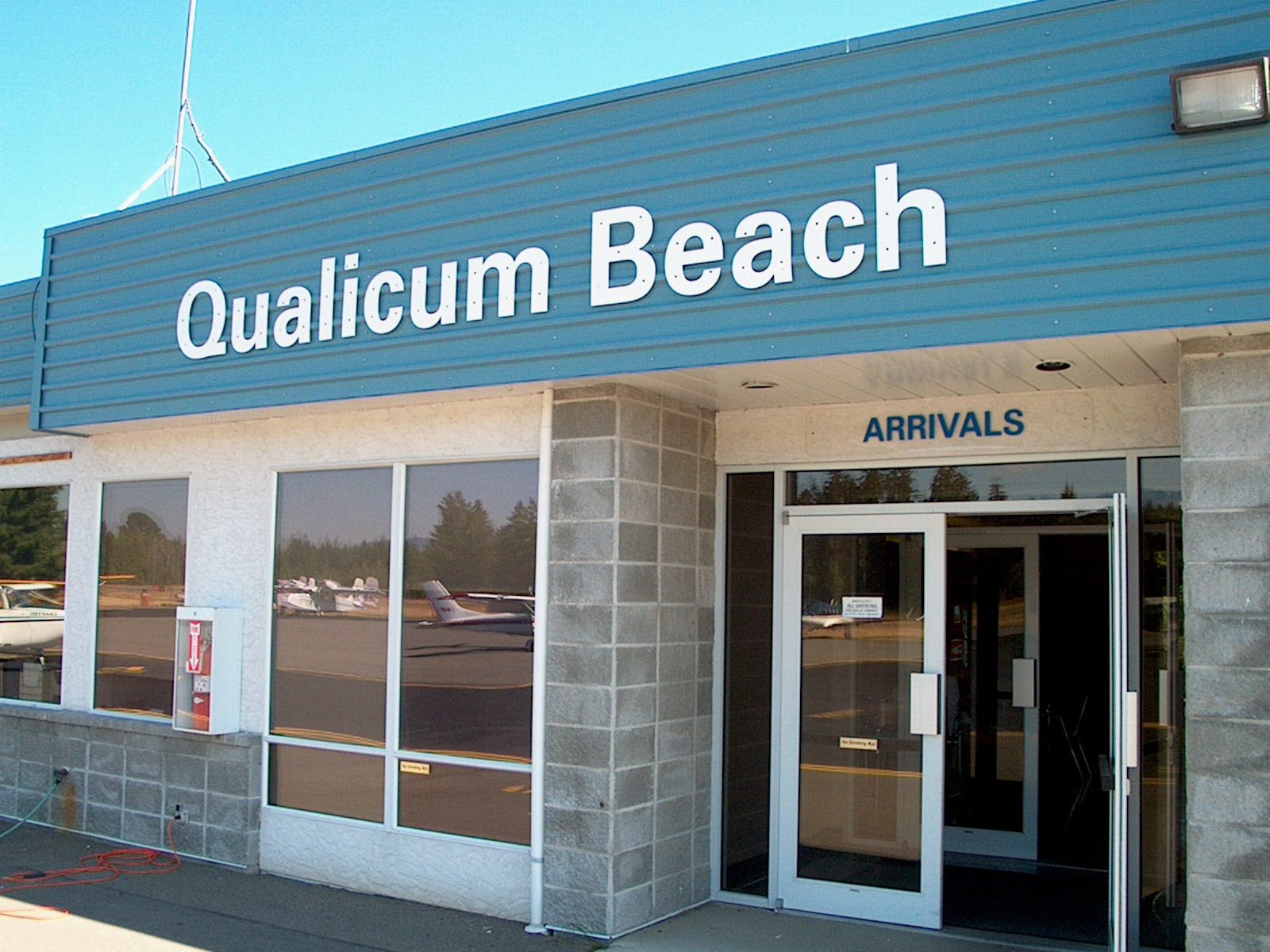
- IATA: XQU; ICAO: none; TC LID: CAT4

Summary
- Airport type: Public
- Operator: Town of Qualicum Beach
- Location: Qualicum Beach, British Columbia
- Time zone: MST (UTC−07:00)
- Elevation AMSL: 190 ft (58 m)
- Coordinates: 49°20′14″N 124°23′38″W
- Website: Qualicum Beach Airport

Map
- Location in British Columbia CAT4 (Canada)

Runways
Direction	Length		Surface
Direction	ft	m	Surface
11/29	3,564	1,086	Asphalt
- Source: Canada Flight Supplement

Qualicum Beach Airport (IATA: XQU, TC LID: CAT4) is located 1.8 nautical miles (3.3 km; 2.1 mi) south of Qualicum Beach, British Columbia, Canada.

== Tenants ==
The following are at the airport:

- Iskwew Air
- Qualicum Flight Centre
- Royal Canadian Air Cadets - 893 Squadron
- Sunwest Helicopters
- Qualicum Beach Aero Centre
- Ascent Helicopters
- ZFF Engines Limited
- Airspan Helicopters
- The Final Approach Restaurant
- Arrowsmith Search and Rescue

== Airlines and destinations ==
Airlines	Destinations
Iskwew Air	Vancouver

== Accidents and incidents ==
=== Cessna 172 ===
On July 25, 2022, a Cessna 172 made an emergency landing just past the runway at the airport. The plane crashed into a ditch on a farmer's property. The pilot was said to be in serious condition, suffering injuries, but survived.

== See also ==
- List of airports on Vancouver Island
