= Bella Coola Airport =

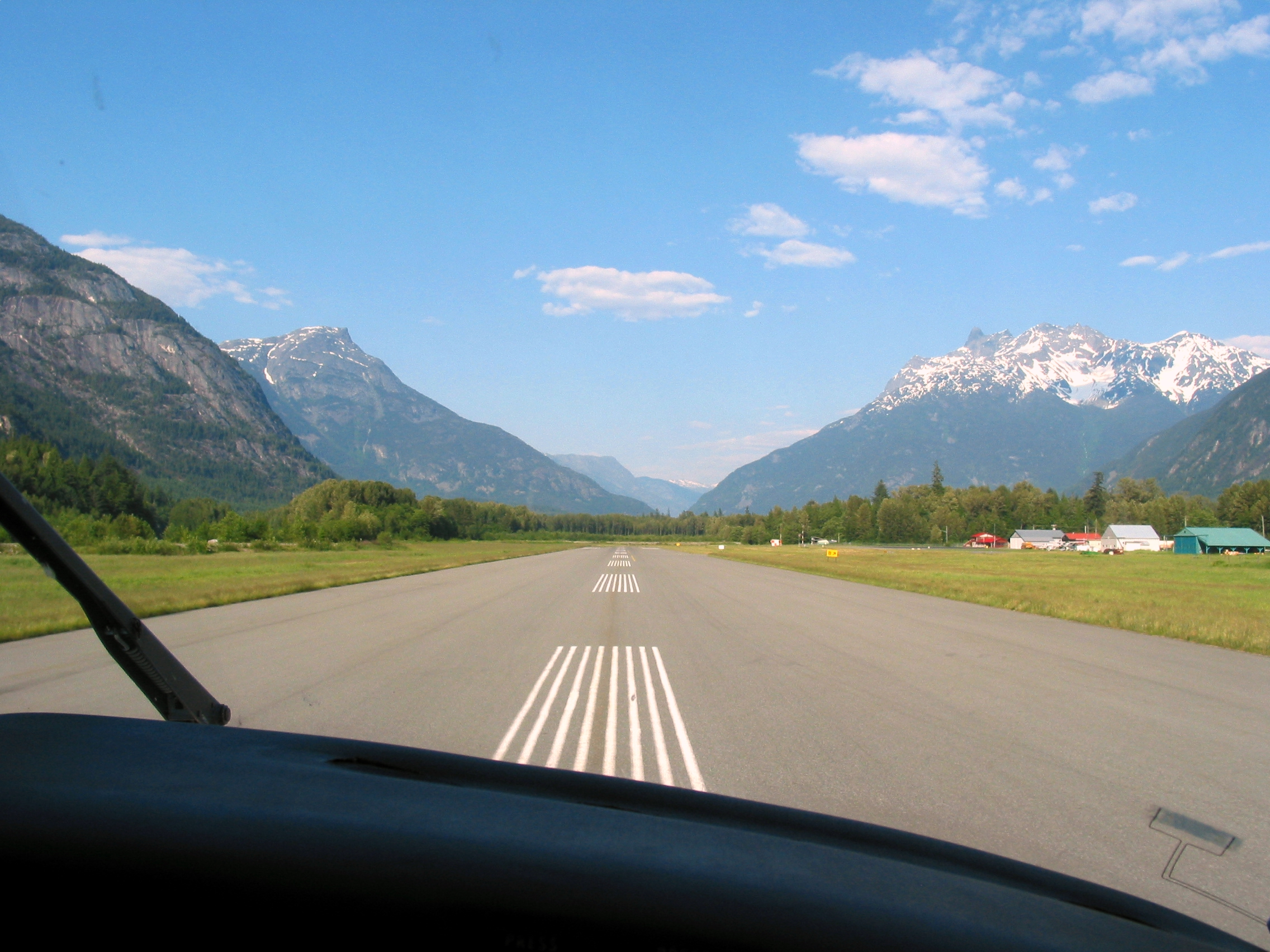
- IATA: QBC; ICAO: CYBD; WMO: 71206

Summary
- Airport type: Private
- Operator: Central Coast Regional District
- Location: Bella Coola, British Columbia
- Time zone: MST (UTC−07:00)
- Elevation AMSL: 117 ft / 36 m
- Coordinates: 52°23′15″N 126°35′45″W

Map
- Location in British Columbia

Runways
Direction	Length		Surface
Direction	ft	m	Surface
05/23	4,200	1,280	Asphalt
- Source: Canada Flight Supplement; Environment Canada

Bella Coola Airport (IATA: QBC, ICAO: CYBD) is located 6 nautical miles (11 km; 6.9 mi) northeast of Bella Coola, British Columbia, Canada.

This airport is limited to Day/VFR operations. Weather reports are available most days until 3PM local time by contacting Kamloops Flight Service (Nav Canada).

== Airlines and destinations ==
Airlines	Destinations
Pacific Coastal Airlines	Vancouver
