= Vancouver International Airport =

Airport in Richmond, British Columbia, Canada

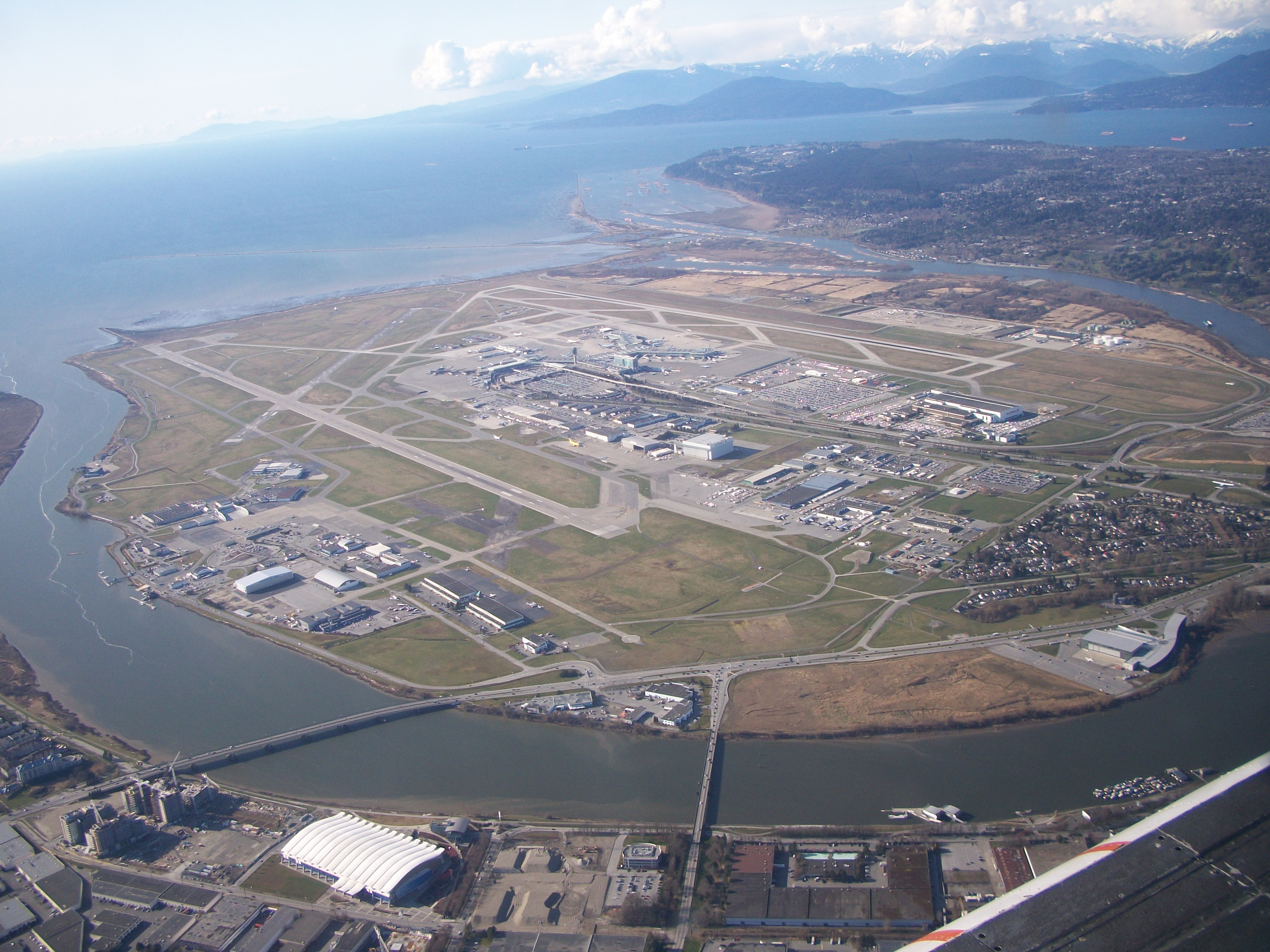
- Aerial view of Vancouver International Airport in 2012
- IATA: YVR; ICAO: CYVR; TC LID: YVR; WMO: 71892

Summary
- Airport type: Public
- Owner: Transport Canada
- Operator: Vancouver International Airport Authority
- Serves: Greater Vancouver
- Location: Sea Island, Richmond, British Columbia, Canada
- Opened: July 22, 1931; 95 years ago
- Hub for: Air Canada; Pacific Coastal Airlines; WestJet
- Focus city for: Air North
- Operating base for: Air Canada Rouge; Central Mountain Air; Flair Airlines
- Time zone: MST (UTC−07:00)
- Elevation AMSL: 13 ft (4.0 m)
- Coordinates: 49°11′41″N 123°10′57″W
- Public transit access: YVR–Airport station
- Website: www.yvr.ca

Map
- Interactive map of Vancouver International Airport

Runways
Direction	Length		Surface
Direction	ft	m	Surface
08L/26R	9,941	3,030	Asphalt / concrete
08R/26L	12,188	3,715	Asphalt / concrete
13/31	7,300	2,225	Asphalt / concrete

Helipads
Number	Length		Surface
Number	ft	m	Surface
C	108 (dia)	33 (dia)	Concrete / asphalt

Statistics (2025)
- Aircraft movements: 297,350
- Number of passengers: 26,913,561
- Sources: Canada Flight Supplement; Environment Canada; Passenger traffic and movements from yvr.ca

Vancouver International Airport (IATA: YVR, ICAO: CYVR) is an international airport located on Sea Island in Richmond, British Columbia, serving the city of Vancouver and the Lower Mainland region. It is located 12 km (7.5 mi) from Downtown Vancouver. The airport is managed by Vancouver Airport Authority, a nonprofit organization, and covers a total expanse of about 1,340 hectares (3,311 acres) of airport property.

Vancouver is the second busiest airport in Canada by passenger traffic (26.2 million), with the site serving as Canada's main transpacific airport. Vancouver International Airport is a hub for Air Canada, WestJet, and Pacific Coastal Airlines, and is one of nine Canadian airports that have US border pre-clearance facilities. It is also one of the few major international airports to have a terminal, the Vancouver International Water Airport, for scheduled floatplanes.

The airport has won several notable international best airport awards. It won the Skytrax Best North American Airport award in 2007 and 2010 through 2022, for a record of 12 consecutive years, then again in 2024 and 2026. Vancouver also retains the distinction of Best Canadian Airport in the regional results.

== History ==
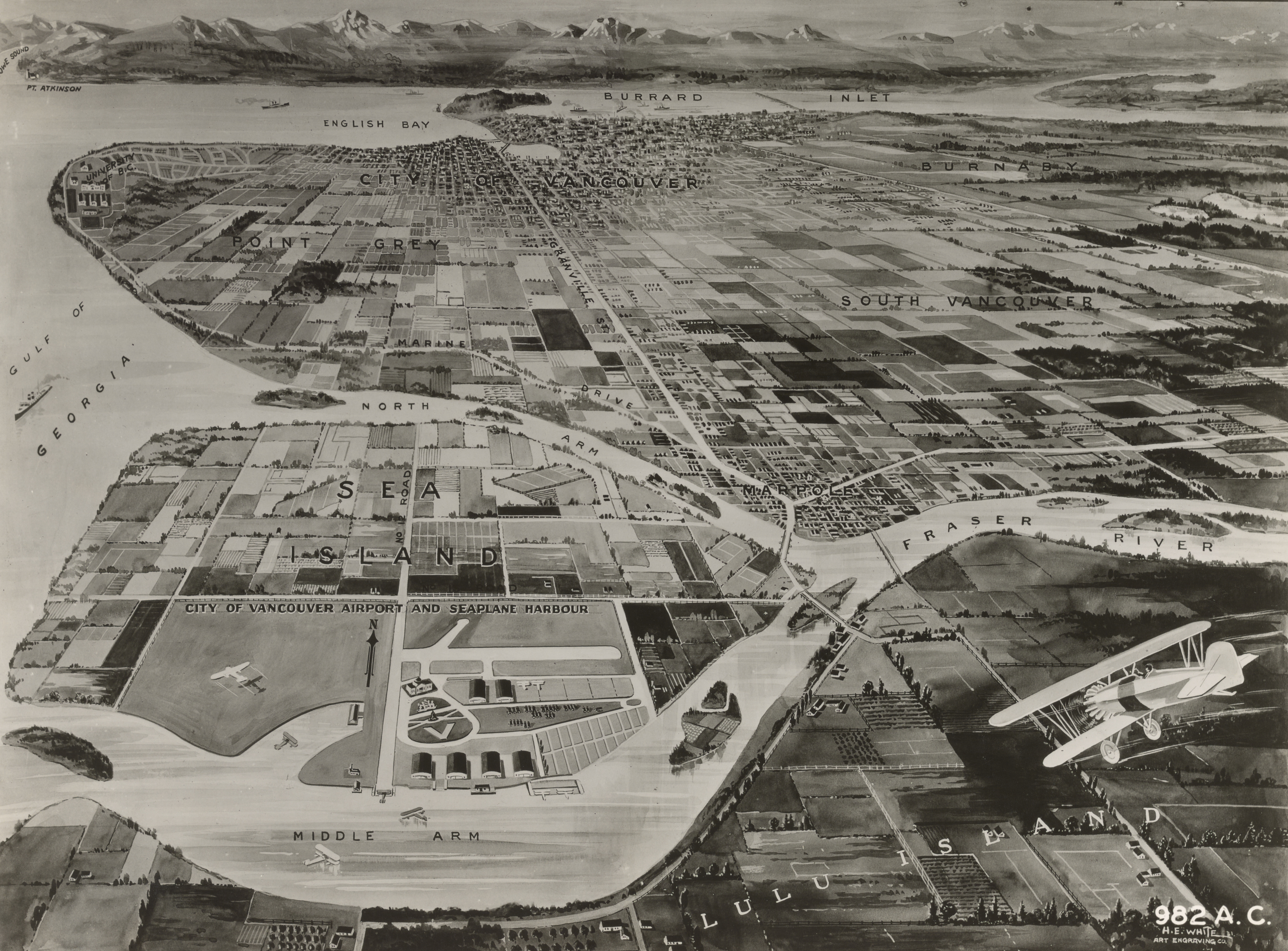
The airport and surrounding area in 1940

In 1929, the City of Vancouver purchased land located on Sea Island to be used for aviation purposes, replacing the original grass airstrip at Minoru Park on Lulu Island. During World War II, the airport and its original terminal, now the South Terminal, were leased to the federal government and operated by the Department of National Defence and the Department of Transport as RCAF Station Sea Island. The airport was used for the British Commonwealth Air Training Plan. The crews and their families were housed in a new townsite on the island, named Burkeville, after Boeing president Stanley Burke. Funds from the lease were used to purchase additional land for new hangars and a production plant for Boeing Aircraft of Canada (now Boeing Canada).

The present main terminal was completed in 1968 and has since been expanded to include separate domestic and international terminals. A north runway was completed in 1996.

A United States border pre-clearance facility was created in the 1970s and, as of 2024, has the longest operating hours of any US pre-clearance facility, operating from 4:30 am to midnight the next day.

In 2011, the airport announced that it would enact a program aiming to encourage airlines to start more flights between Vancouver and Asia.

The airport has often been described as a major trans-Pacific hub due to its location in the Pacific Northwest and destinations in the Americas, Asia, and Australia, which help facilitate connecting flights. In 2019, Craig Richmond, then president and CEO of the Vancouver Airport Authority, said that the recent growth of Seattle–Tacoma International Airport in the United States could challenge Vancouver's status as a trans-Pacific hub, although Seattle/Tacoma is already the larger airport.

Sea Island, where the airport is situated, is at sea level and has a 22-kilometre (14 mi) system of dikes to protect the airport. The island has been identified as a location vulnerable to future storm surges and extreme weather events caused by climate change, requiring new pump stations and a raised dike.

== Terminals ==
Vancouver International Airport has two terminals: the Main Terminal and the South Terminal. The main terminal contains domestic and international concourses. Free internet access is available in all sections of the airport. Throughout the airport, there is trilingual English, French, and Chinese signage, set in the typeface Helvetica. The South Terminal, along with the adjacent floatplane docks, is referred to by airport management as "Airport South".

=== Domestic concourse ===
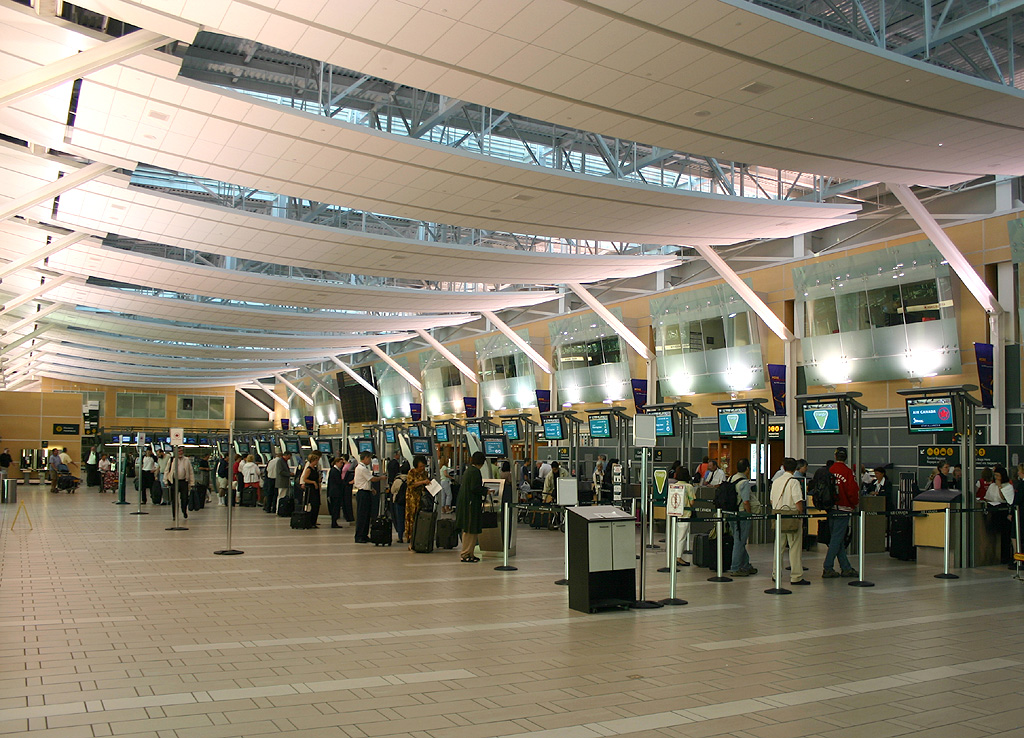
Air Canada domestic check-in facilities at the Domestic Terminal

The Domestic section of the terminal was constructed in 1968 by the Vancouver-based firm Thompson, Berwick and Pratt and was given a top-to-bottom renovation in 2005 by Vancouver architect Kasian Kennedy. The Domestic area consists of three piers (A–C).

==== Pier A ====
Pier A consists of six gates: A6 through A10 and A12. These gates are ground loading ramps used by WestJet Encore.

==== Pier B ====
Pier B consists of 15 gates: gates B13 through B27. Gates B14 to B17 can receive international and US arrivals. Gates B23 to B25 are ground loading ramps. Pier B is the hub for domestic flights for WestJet, and additionally serves domestic flights by Air North, Air Transat, Flair Airlines, and Porter Airlines.

==== Pier C ====
Pier C consists of 24 gates: C29 through C52. This is the hub for Air Canada and Air Canada Express domestic flights. Gates C48 to C52 are swing gates, which can be used for international departures (designated as D48 to D52) as well as international and US arrivals.

=== International & US concourse ===
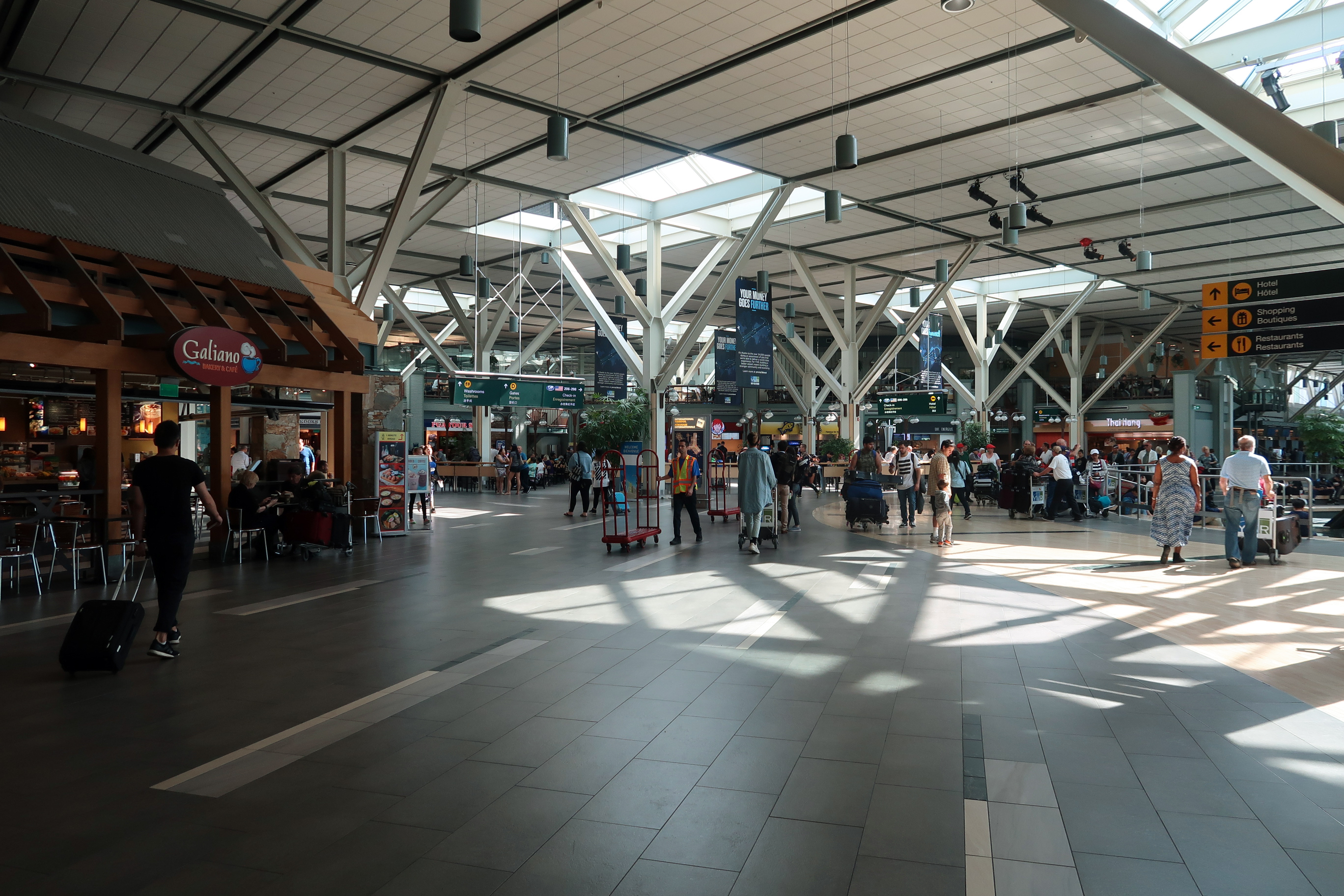
International departure hall

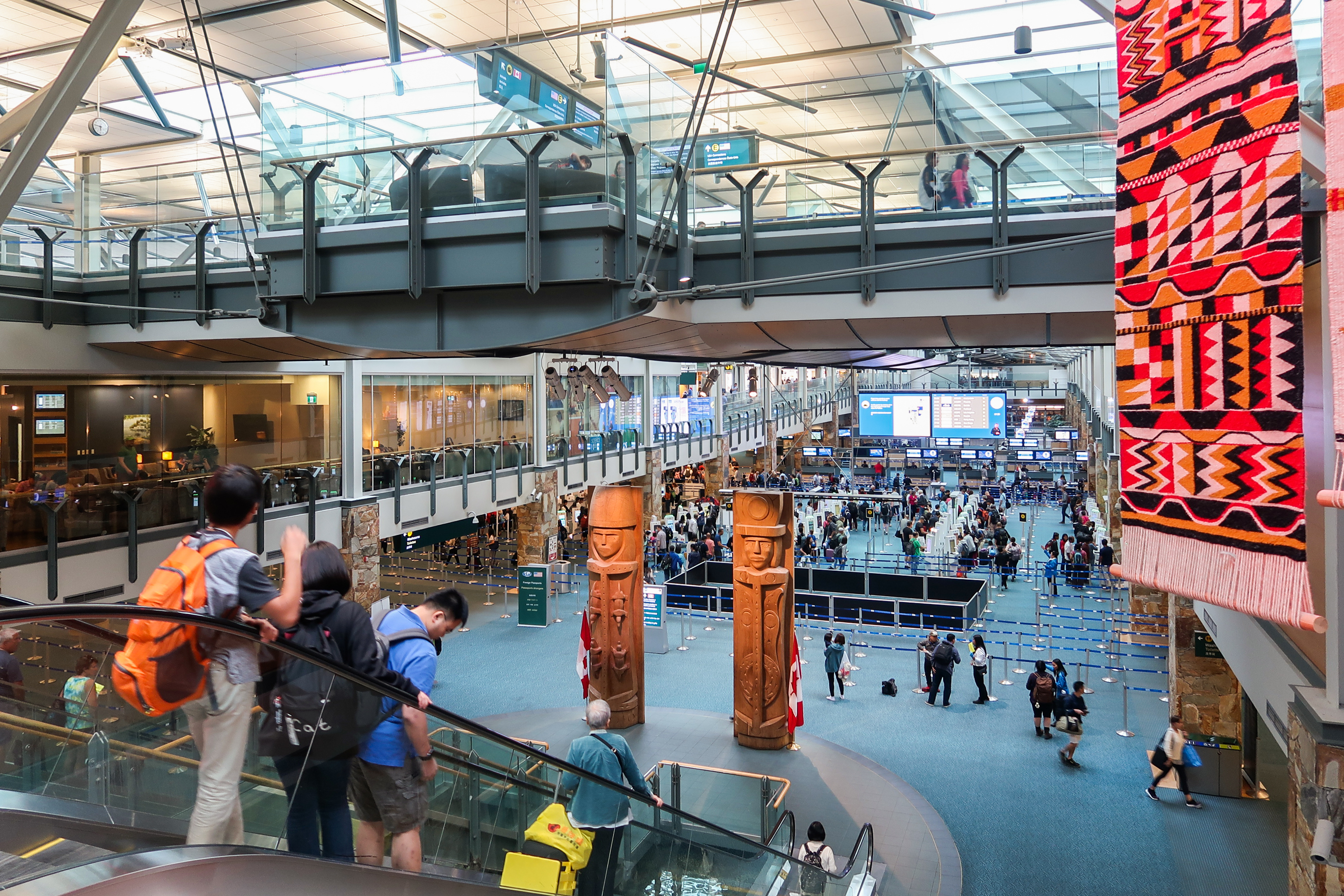
International arrivals hall

The International concourse was designed by Vancouver-based Architectura, now Stantec, with Kansas City–based HNTB Corporation (1994–1996). It was expanded to the west between 2017 and 2021 to allow for more gates and more remote stand operations. YVR is one of eight Canadian airports with United States border preclearance facilities, which are situated in this section of the terminal. All international concourse gates can accept flights arriving from international and US origins; passengers are directed onto overhead walkways which lead to the Canada Border Services Agency screening area.

==== Pier D (International Pier) ====
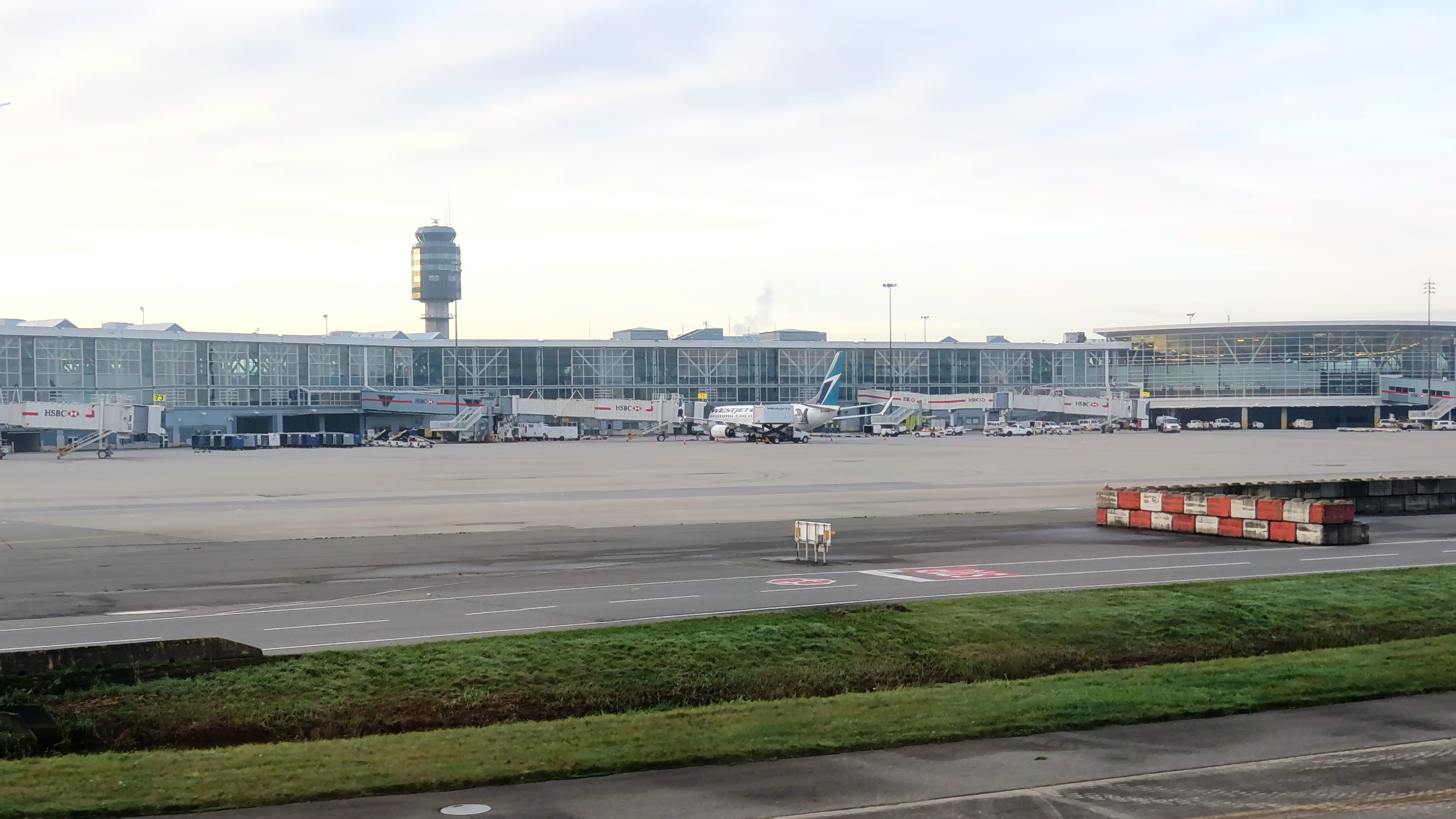
Exterior of airport (International Concourse)

Pier D consists of 31 gates: D48 to D78, of which 7 (D56, D57, D59, D60, D61, D63, and D65) are bus gates for remote stands. All international-bound flights, excluding those to the United States, depart from D gates. All gates can handle wide-body aircraft; 11 gates are fitted with 2 jet bridges, and four of these gates can handle the Airbus A380, a service of which was seasonally operated to Vancouver by British Airways until September 26, 2022. Gates D48 to D52 are swing gates which can be used for domestic departures (designated C48 to C52), and gates D71 through D78 are swing gates which can be used for United States border preclearance flights (designated E71 through E78).

A SkyTeam airport lounge operated by Global Lounge Network is located near gate D53, and the Air Canada Maple Leaf Lounge is at Gate D52.

==== Pier E (US Pier) ====
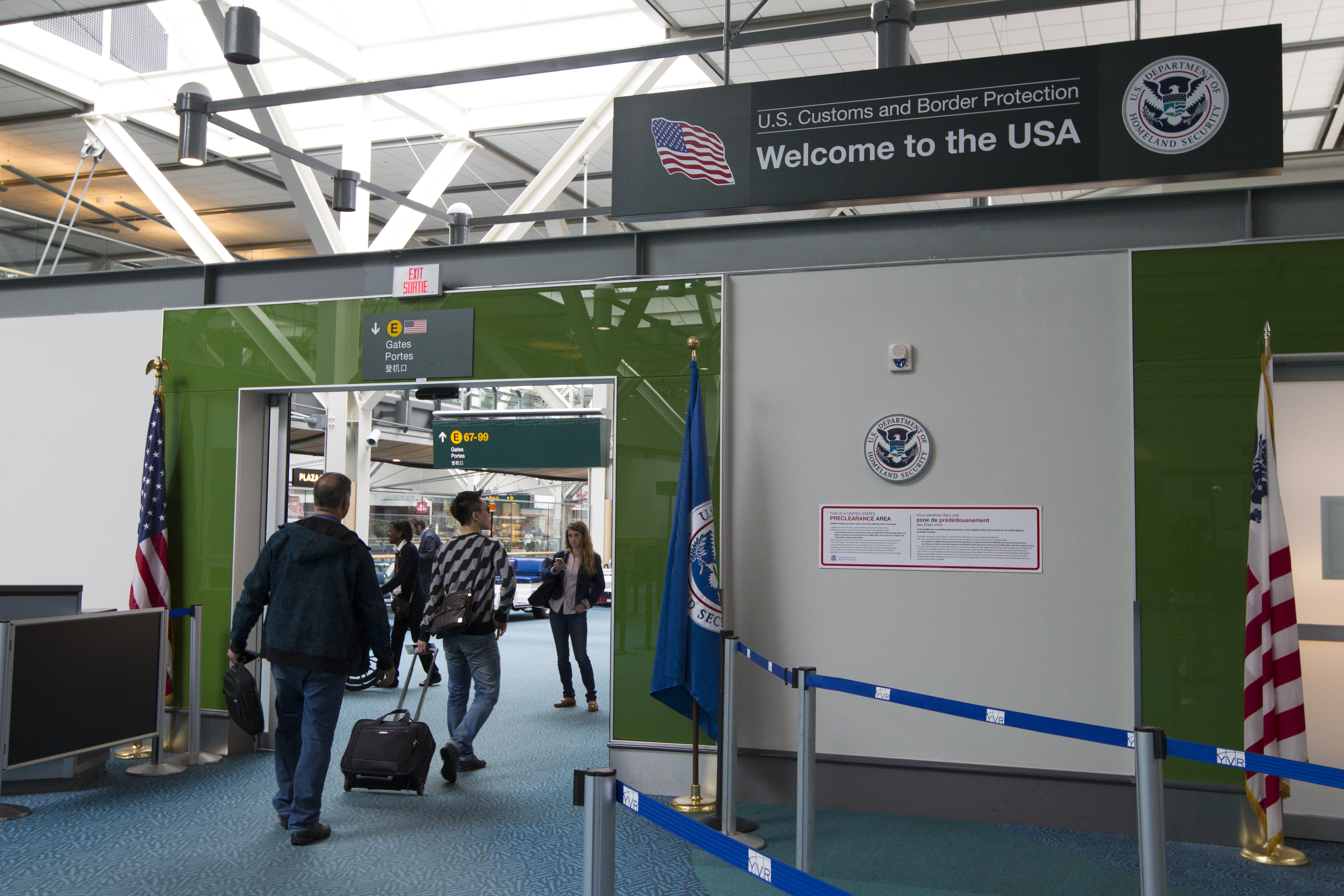
Corridor to the boarding gates after the US border clearance, with signs in English, French and Chinese

Preclearance was added to the airport in the 1970s.

Pier E is the US border preclearance area and consists of 25 gates: E71 to E88 and E90 to E96. Gates E71 to E78 are swing gates which can be switched to international departures (as gates D71 to D78) as needed. Gate E84 is a bus gate for remote stands. Gates E90 through E96 are located in a smaller satellite building connected via a ground-level walkway. Gate E95 accesses ground-loading stands 95A and 95B.

=== Airport South ===
The Airport South complex includes the South Terminal, the floatplane facility, and other adjacent operations.

==== South Terminal ====
The South Terminal, a portion of the original pre-1968 terminal which is still in use, also houses the corporate headquarters and main base of Pacific Coastal Airlines and Harbour Air.

The South Terminal serves regional airlines which fly mostly within British Columbia, such as Pacific Coastal Airlines and Central Mountain Air, in addition to chartered flights. A nearby building serves as the YVR terminal for Helijet.

==== Floatplane facility ====
The Vancouver International Water Airport (TC LID: CAM9) is located on Inglis Drive, a short distance from the South Terminal. This facility allows floatplanes to land and dock on the South Arm of the Fraser River. The facility is served by all floatplane operators other than Harbour Air, which maintains a separate dock and terminal at the Flying Beaver Bar and Grill nearby.

== Airlines and destinations ==
=== Passenger ===
Airlines	Destinations	Refs
Aeroméxico	Mexico City–Benito Juárez	
Air Canada	Bangkok–Suvarnabhumi, Beijing–Capital, Brisbane, Calgary, Cancún, Chicago–O'Hare, Denver, Edmonton, Guangzhou (begins May 4, 2027), Hong Kong, Honolulu, Houston–Intercontinental, Las Vegas, London–Heathrow, Los Angeles, Manila, Mexico City–Benito Juárez, Miami, Montréal–Trudeau, Newark, Orange County, Ottawa, Puerto Vallarta, Regina, San Francisco, Saskatoon, Seoul–Incheon, Shanghai–Pudong, Singapore (ends January 26, 2027), Sydney–Kingsford Smith, Tokyo–Narita, Toronto–Pearson, Winnipeg, Yellowknife; Seasonal: Anchorage, Auckland, Austin, Dublin, Frankfurt, Halifax, Huatulco, Ixtapa/Zihuatanejo, Kahului, Kailua-Kona, Kelowna, Liberia (CR) (begins December 13, 2026), Mazatlán (begins December 15, 2026), Monterrey (begins December 3, 2026), Osaka–Kansai, Palm Springs, Phoenix–Sky Harbor, Puerto Escondido (begins December 7, 2026), Québec City, Regina, San José del Cabo, Sapporo–Chitose (begins December 17, 2026), Whitehorse	
Air Canada Express	Calgary, Castlegar, Comox, Cranbrook, Edmonton, Fort St. John, Kamloops, Kelowna, Nanaimo, Phoenix–Sky Harbor, Portland (OR), Prince George, Prince Rupert, Sacramento, San Diego, Sandspit, San Francisco, Seattle/Tacoma, Smithers, Terrace/Kitimat, Victoria; Seasonal: Whitehorse, Winnipeg	
Air Canada Rouge	Cancún, Edmonton, Huatulco, Kelowna, Las Vegas, Los Angeles, Mexico City–Benito Juárez, Miami, Puerto Vallarta, San José del Cabo	
Air China	Beijing–Capital	
Air France	Paris–Charles de Gaulle	
Air India	Delhi–Indira Gandhi	
Air New Zealand	Auckland	
Air North	Kelowna, Victoria, Whitehorse; Seasonal: Kamloops (begins May 28, 2027) Yellowknife	
Alaska Airlines	Portland (OR), Seattle/Tacoma	
All Nippon Airways	Tokyo–Haneda; Seasonal: Tokyo–Narita	
American Airlines	Dallas/Fort Worth; Seasonal: Charlotte, Chicago–O'Hare, Los Angeles	
American Eagle	Seasonal: Los Angeles	
Beijing Capital Airlines	Hangzhou, Qingdao	
British Airways	London–Heathrow; Seasonal: London–Gatwick	
Cathay Pacific	Hong Kong	
Central Mountain Air	Kelowna, Quesnel, Smithers, Williams Lake	
China Airlines	Taipei–Taoyuan	
China Eastern Airlines	Shanghai–Pudong	
China Southern Airlines	Guangzhou	
Condor	Seasonal: Frankfurt	
Corilair	Seasonal: Campbell River	
Delta Air Lines	Los Angeles, Minneapolis/Saint Paul; Seasonal: Atlanta	
Delta Connection	Salt Lake City, Seattle/Tacoma	
Edelweiss Air	Seasonal: Zurich	
EVA Air	Taipei–Taoyuan	
Fiji Airways	Nadi	
Flair Airlines	Calgary, Edmonton, Guadalajara, Kelowna, Las Vegas, Los Angeles, Mexico City–Benito Juárez, San Francisco, Toronto–Pearson, Winnipeg; Seasonal: Cancún, León/El Bajío, Montréal–Trudeau, Puerto Vallarta	
Gulf Island Seaplanes	Gabriola Island/Silva Bay	
Hainan Airlines	Shenzhen	
Harbour Air	Bedwell Harbour, Comox Harbour, Ganges Harbour, Miners Bay, Nanaimo Harbour, Tofino Harbour, Victoria Harbour, Whistler/Green Lake; Seasonal: Sechelt, Tofino, Victoria	
Helijet	Nanaimo Harbour, Vancouver Harbour, Victoria Harbour	
Hong Kong Airlines	Hong Kong	
Icelandair	Reykjavík–Keflavík	
Iskwew Air	Qualicum Beach	
Japan Airlines	Tokyo–Narita	
JetBlue	New York–JFK; Seasonal: Boston	
KLM	Amsterdam	
Korean Air	Seoul–Incheon	
Lufthansa	Frankfurt, Munich	
Pacific Coastal Airlines	Anahim Lake, Bella Bella, Bella Coola, Campbell River, Comox, Cranbrook, Masset, Nanaimo, Penticton, Port Hardy, Powell River, Prince George, Quesnel, Tofino, Trail, Victoria, Williams Lake	
Philippine Airlines	Manila	
Porter Airlines	Hamilton (ON), London (ON) (begins April 12, 2027), Montréal–MET, Montréal–Trudeau, Ottawa, Toronto–Pearson; Seasonal: Phoenix–Sky Harbor	
Qantas	Sydney–Kingsford Smith	
Seair Seaplanes	Bedwell Harbour, Ganges Harbour, Miners Bay, Montague Harbour, Nanaimo Harbour, Port Washington	
Sichuan Airlines	Chengdu–Tianfu	
Sunshine Coast Air	Nanaimo Harbour, Sechelt	
Trinity Airways	Seoul–Incheon	
Turkish Airlines	Istanbul	
United Airlines	Chicago–O'Hare, Denver, Houston–Intercontinental, Los Angeles, San Francisco; Seasonal: Newark, Washington–Dulles	
United Express	Seasonal: San Francisco	
WestJet	Calgary, Cancún, Edmonton, Honolulu, Kahului, Las Vegas, Palm Springs, Phoenix–Sky Harbor, Puerto Vallarta, San José del Cabo, Saskatoon, Toronto–Pearson, Winnipeg; Seasonal: Atlanta, Detroit, Halifax, Huatulco, Ixtapa/Zihuatanejo, Kailua-Kona, Kelowna, Liberia (CR), Los Angeles, Mazatlán, Regina	
WestJet Encore	Comox, Cranbrook, Fort St. John, Kelowna, Nanaimo, Prince George, Terrace/Kitimat, Victoria; Seasonal: Penticton	
XiamenAir	Xiamen	
Zipair Tokyo	Tokyo–Narita	

=== Hub airlines ===
Airlines that have a hub in YVR are Air Canada, Westjet, and Flair Airlines. Some smaller airlines that also use YVR as a hub are Pacific Coastal Airlines and Harbour Air. Porter and Air North use YVR as a focus city.

=== Cargo ===
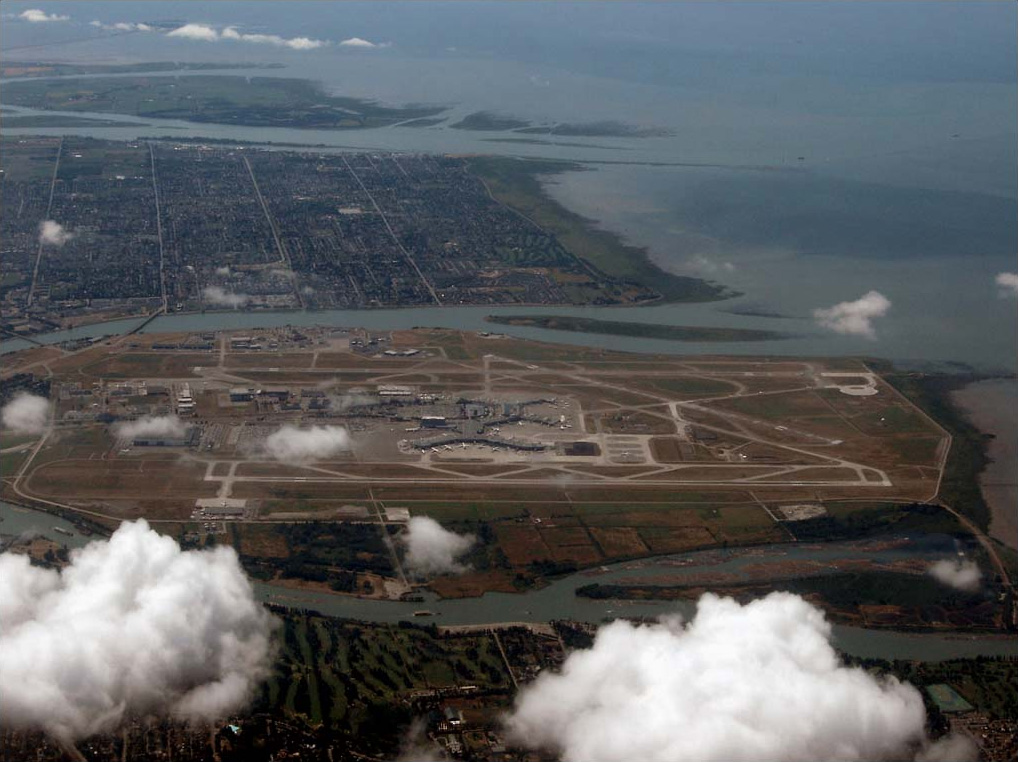
Aerial shot showing Georgia Strait near the airport

Airlines	Destinations
Air Canada Cargo	Toronto–Pearson
Amazon Air	Calgary, Edmonton, Hamilton (ON)
Cargojet	Calgary, Cincinnati, Edmonton, Hamilton (ON), Louisville, Montreal–Mirabel, Tokyo–Narita, Victoria, Winnipeg
Carson Air	Calgary, Kamloops, Kelowna
Central Mountain Air Cargo	Kelowna, Quesnel, Williams Lake
China Southern Cargo	Qingdao, Shanghai–Pudong, Toronto–Pearson
DHL Aviation	Cincinnati, Los Angeles, Portland (OR), Seattle/Tacoma
FedEx Express	Memphis, Los Angeles
FedEx Feeder	Calgary, Edmonton, Nanaimo, Toronto–Pearson, Victoria, Winnipeg
KF Cargo	Kamloops, Kelowna, Prince George, Victoria
Korean Air Cargo	Guadalajara, Seoul–Incheon
Morningstar Air Express	Calgary, Edmonton, Winnipeg, Toronto–Pearson
UPS Airlines	Louisville

== Statistics ==
Vancouver International saw a steady increase in passenger volumes from 2010 to 2019. Between 2020 and 2021, patronage dropped significantly due to the COVID-19 pandemic. The airport has seen a steady recovery of passengers, however; the patronage in 2022 was about 72% of the patronage in 2019.

=== Annual traffic ===
Annual passenger traffic (enplaned + deplaned) at YVR, 1992–2012
Year	Passengers	% change
1992	9,935,285	Steady
1993	10,235,015	▲3.2%
1994	10,830,796	▲5.8%
1995	12,006,973	▲10.8%
1996	14,037,174	▲16.9%
1997	14,818,564	▲5.5%
1998	15,508,109	▲4.6%
1999	15,806,499	▲1.9%
2000	16,032,531	▲1.4%
2001	15,476,762	▼–3.4%
2002	14,877,536	▼–3.8%
2003	14,321,504	▼–3.7%
2004	15,725,694	▲9.8%
2005	16,418,883	▲4.4%
2006	16,922,226	▲3.0%
2007	17,495,049	▲3.3%
2008	17,852,459	▲2.0%
2009	16,179,312	▼–9.3%
2010	16,778,774	▲3.7%
2011	17,032,780	▲1.5%
2012	17,596,901	▲3.3%

Annual passenger traffic (enplaned + deplaned) at YVR, 2013–present
Year	Passengers	% change
2013	17,971,883	▲2.1%
2014	19,358,203	▲7.7%
2015	20,315,978	▲4.9%
2016	22,288,552	▲9.7%
2017	24,166,122	▲8.4%
2018	25,936,907	▲7.3%
2019	26,379,870	▲1.7%
2020 (Note: Statistics reflect a large reduction in the amount of travellers due to the COVID-19 pandemic since March 2020.)	7,300,287	▼–72.3%
2021	7,086,602	▼–3.0%
2022	19,013,129	▲168.3%
2023	24,937,282	▲31.2%
2024	26,205,801	▲5.1%
2025	26,913,561	▲2.7%

== Ground transportation ==
=== Rapid transit (SkyTrain) ===
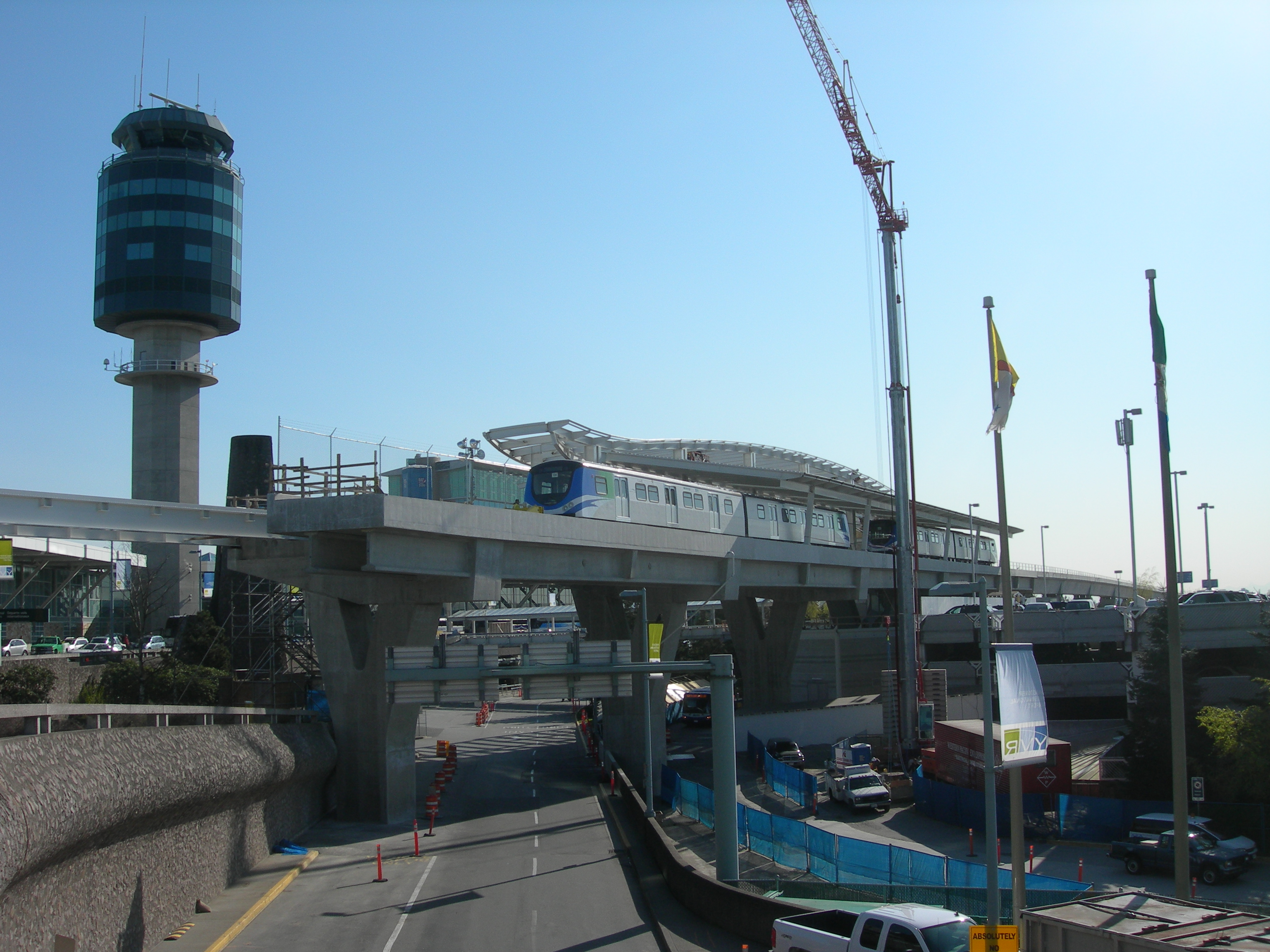
SkyTrain's Canada Line

The airport has a station on the SkyTrain network called YVR–Airport, the terminus of the Sea Island branch of the Canada Line. The airport authority contributed $300 million towards construction as part of the Canada Line's funding. A pedestrian footbridge (cost: $117 million, completed in 2007) links the international terminal with the domestic terminal and serves as the arrival and departure area for users of the Canada Line. The Canada Line itself opened on August 17, 2009, as the third line of Vancouver's rapid transit network. It was the only airport rail link service of any kind in Canada until the opening of Toronto's Union Pearson Express in 2015.

=== Bus ===
When Canada Line service is suspended, such as overnight or other service disruptions, the N10 night bus operated by Coast Mountain Bus Company – the bus operator for the region's transit authority, TransLink – connects the airport's international and domestic terminals to Richmond and downtown Vancouver. The airport's south terminal is served by the 412 bus, which connects to the Canada Line at Bridgeport station. Between 2001 and the Canada Line's opening in 2009, regular bus service was provided by TransLink route 424.

==== Whistler and Squamish ====
YVR Skylynx buses run directly from YVR Vancouver Airport and Vancouver City Centre to Squamish, Creekside Village, and Whistler.

== Expansion ==
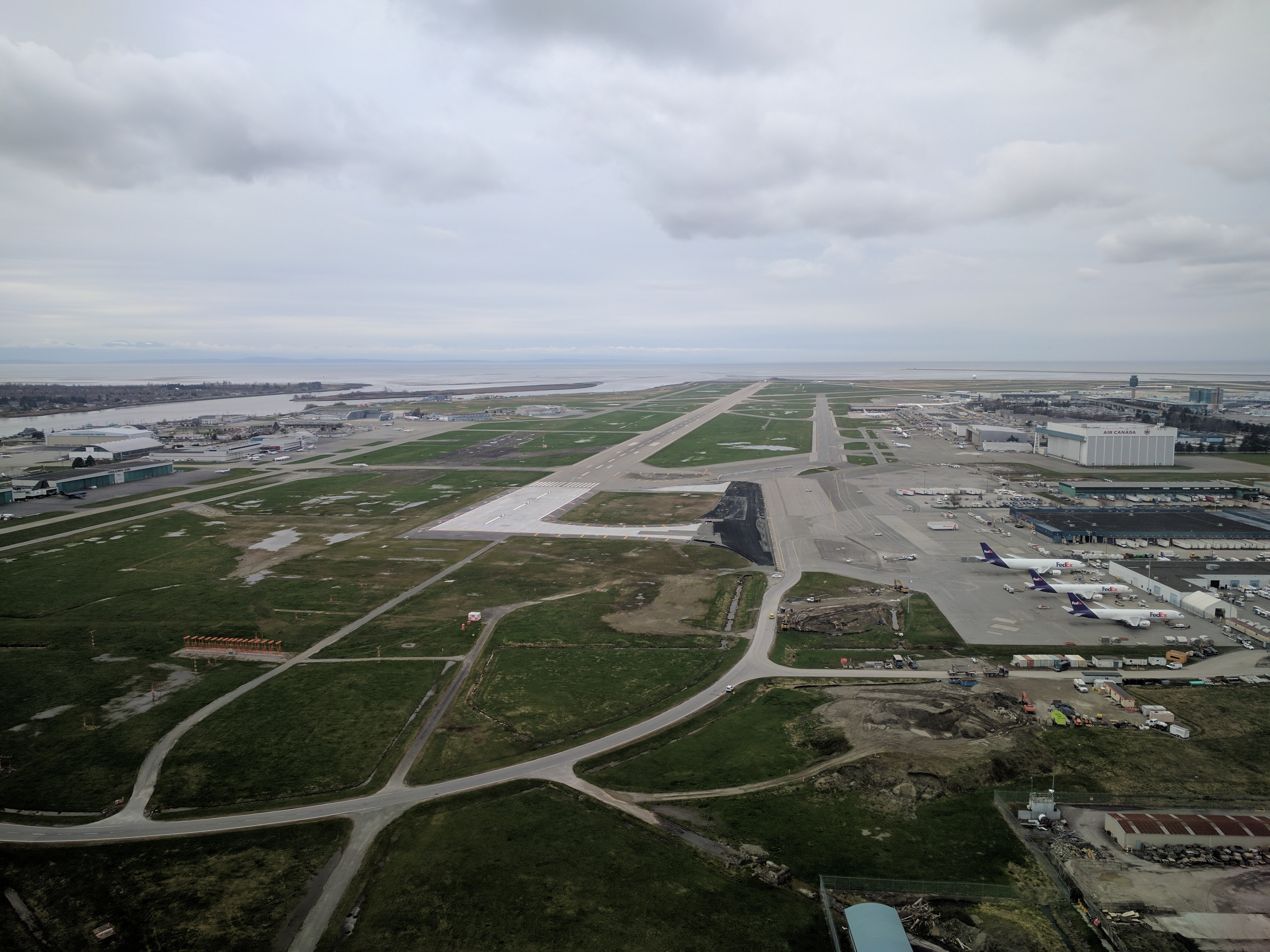
South runway at YVR in 2017 showing the lengthened runway

In 2005, in preparation for the 2010 Winter Olympics, YVR approved a $1.4-billion multi-year capital development plan, which included a four-gate expansion to the International Terminal, completed in June 2007. Two of the four new gates are conventional wide-bodied gates and two can accommodate the Airbus A380. The international terminal addition includes interior design elements intended to represent British Columbia, including a stream in a pathway and fish and jellyfish tanks.

A five-gate expansion was completed in 2009 for Domestic Terminal's Pier C. Food and retail expansions were also completed for Pier C at this time.

In 2017, Vancouver International Airport Authority developed a 2017–2037 master plan, named Flight Plan 2037, which included 75 projects at a projected cost of $5.6billion. The plan allowed for the airport to serve 35 million passengers by 2037. The plan called for the expansion of facilities around the existing large terminal. New piers and gates were to be added, as well as a second parking garage and taxiways. It was also planned to improve vehicle access. Eight gates were added to the international terminal in the first phase which was completed in February 2021. Final approval of the plan by the Ministry of Transport was needed.

== Distinctives ==
=== Architecture ===
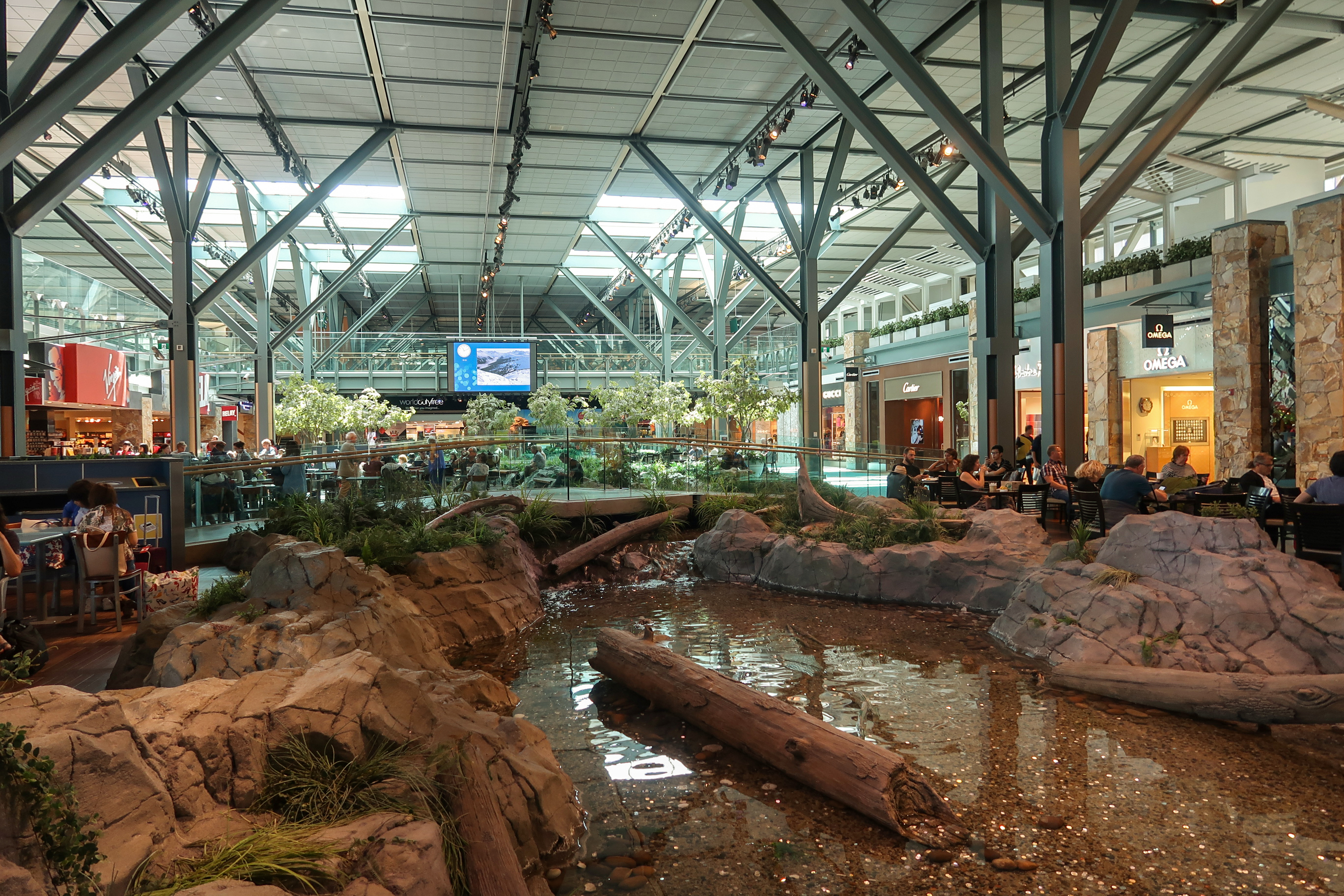
Indoor stream and shops inside the restricted zone

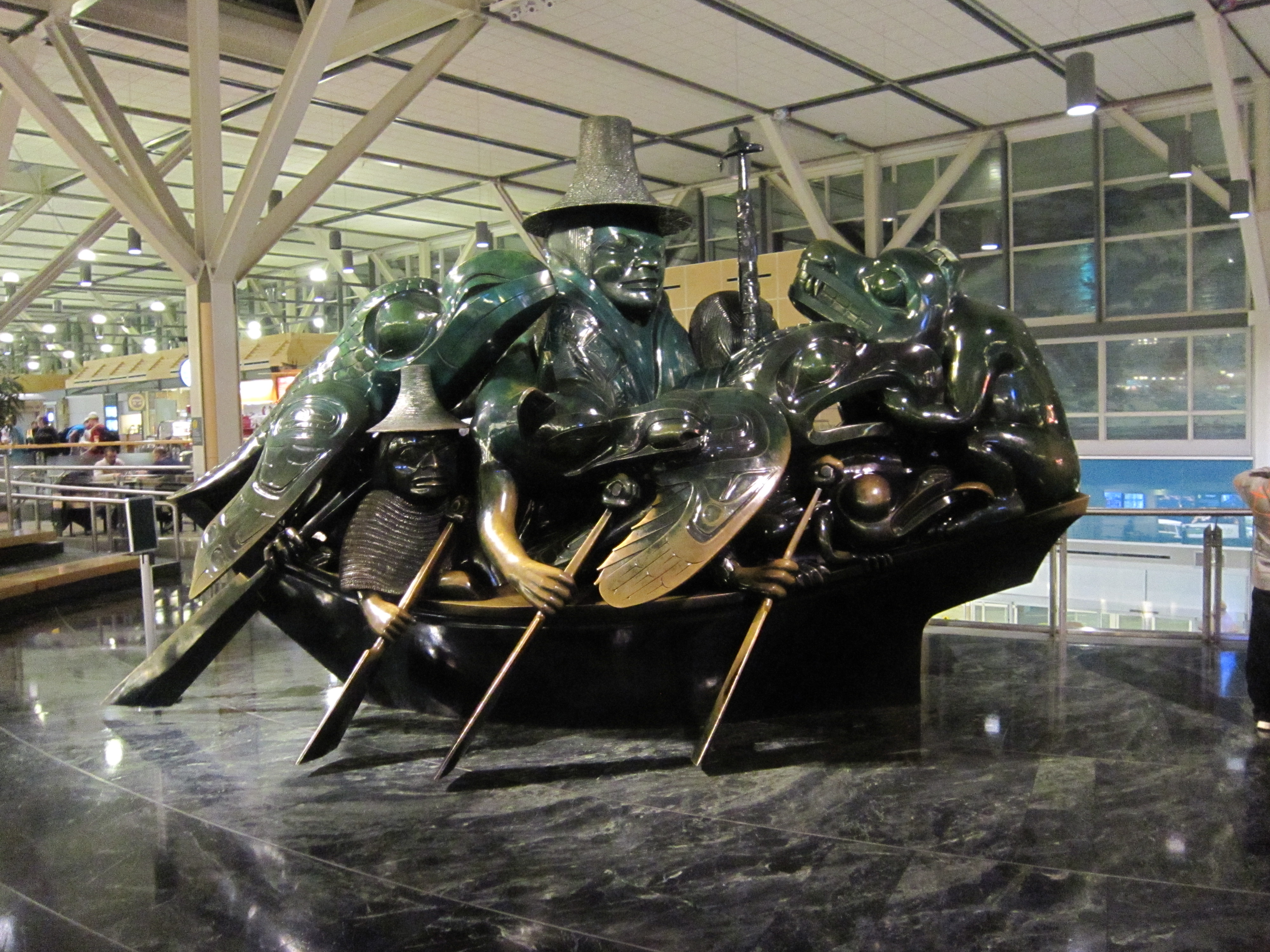
Bill Reid's The Jade Canoe

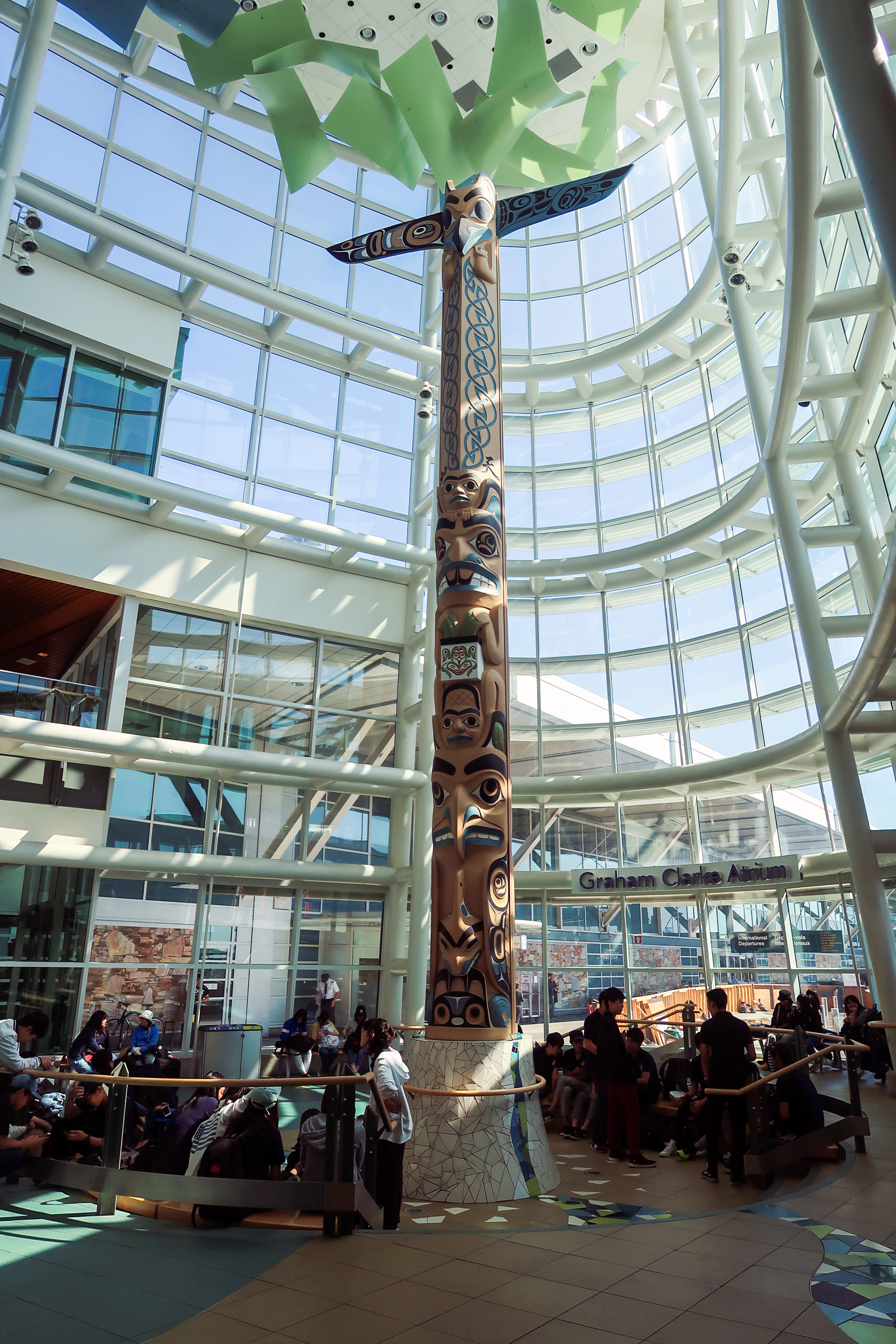
Graham Clarke atrium

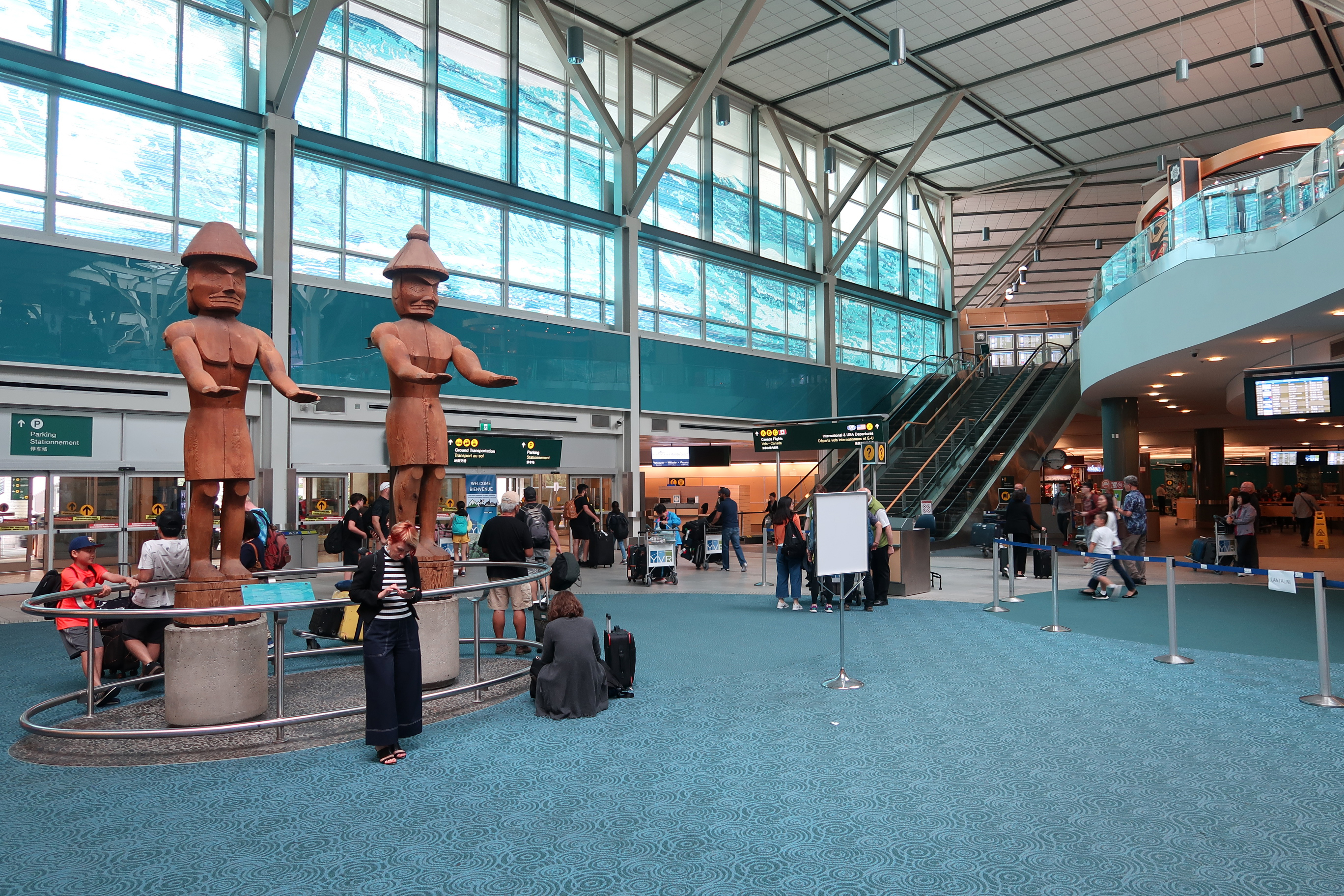
International arrivals lobby on Level 2

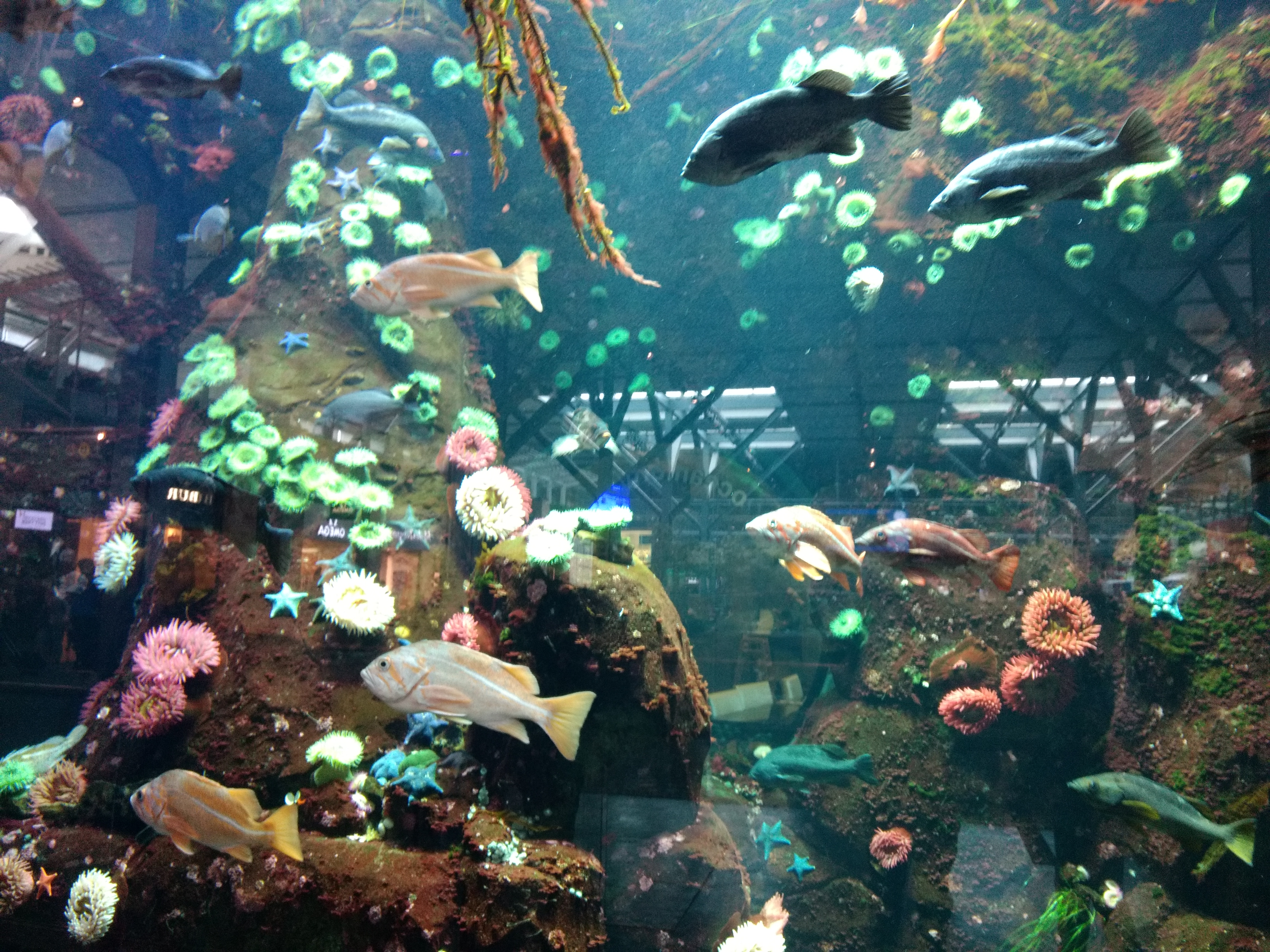
Aquarium at YVR

YVR's interior has a British Columbian theme, featuring a collection of Pacific Northwest Coast Native art, and blues and greens to reflect the colours of the land, sea, and sky. This theme was designed by Vancouver-based firm Architectura. The airport includes significant carpet usage and uses glass to let in large amounts of light. One place for an arriving passenger is the international arrivals hall, a large area where customs and immigration procedures are completed. Arriving passengers come down escalators leading to a platform across a waterfall.

In 2020, the expansion of International Pier D was completed with a glassed-in island forest with access to the outdoors and an immersive digital experience that explores the rugged British Columbia Coast.

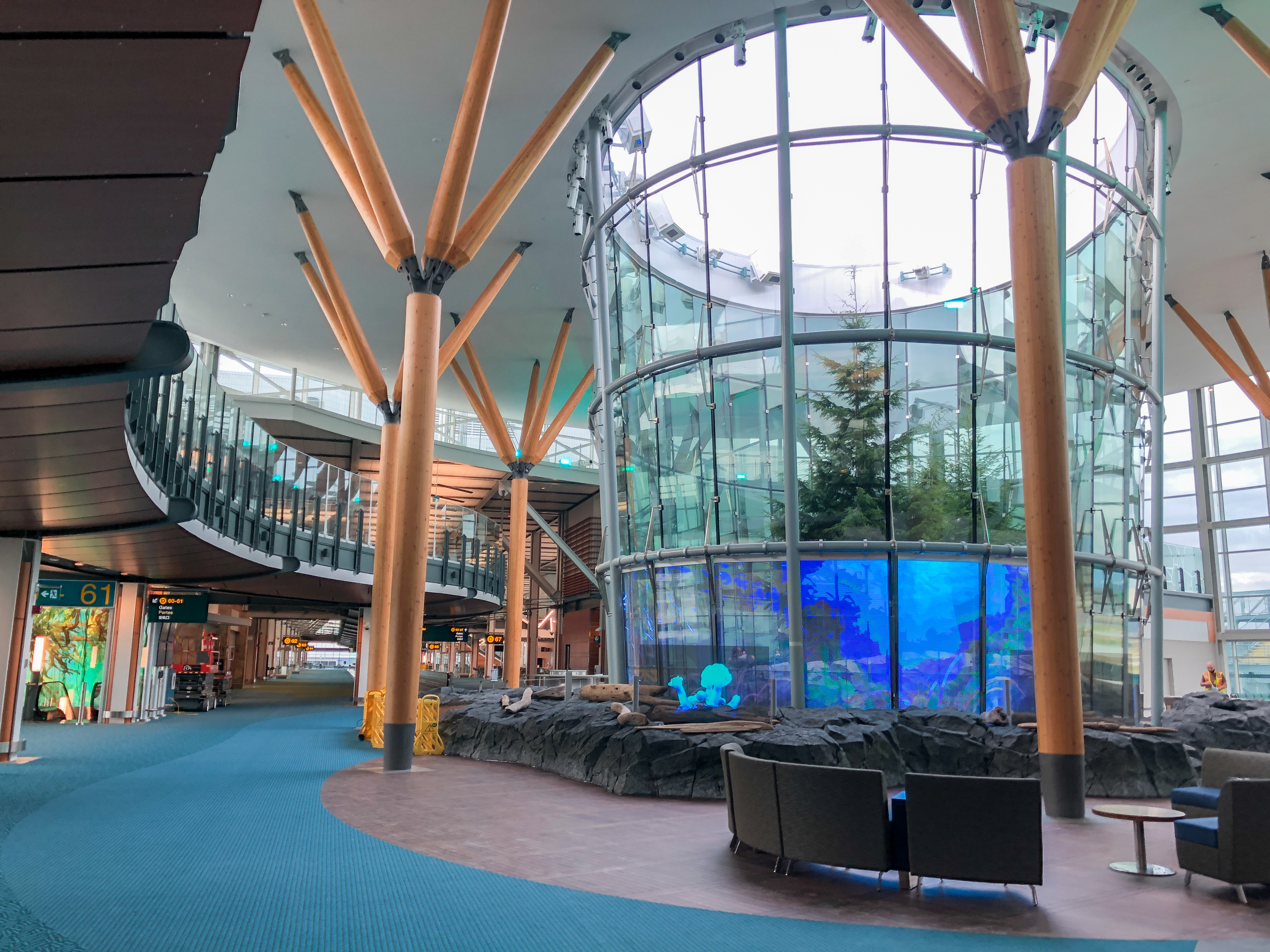
Pier D expansion with glassed-in island forest completed in 2020

=== Art ===
The YVR Aboriginal art collection includes wooden sculptures and totem poles. Bill Reid's sculpture in bronze, The Spirit of Haida Gwaii: The Jade Canoe, is displayed in the international departures area. This is the second of two castings of this sculpture; the first casting, The Spirit of Haida Gwaii, The Black Canoe, is now displayed outside the Canadian Embassy in Washington, D.C. The Pacific Passage area includes artwork by Stan Wamiss and Connie Watts. The Institute for Stained Glass in Canada has documented the stained glass at Vancouver International Airport.

=== Accessibility ===
Since 1992, Vancouver Airport Authority has worked with an independent accessibility consultant to eliminate the physical barriers in the built environment and is "committed to providing fully accessible terminal facilities for people of all backgrounds and capabilities".

In 2004, the airport received the Rick Hansen Accessibility Award, which recognizes "facilities and communities that improve the quality of life for people with mobility limitations".

Designated short-term parking spaces and curb-side ramps are available on each level of the terminal building for vehicles displaying a valid SPARC permit. Accessible counters with toe clearance for wheelchair users are also available at the check-in, customer care, and retail area in Vancouver Airport. Bathrooms have also been designed to be wheelchair-accessible with doorless and no-touch entry features, lowered sinks, and hands-free bathroom dispensers. Grab bars and emergency call buttons are also present in all wheelchair-accessible toilet stalls.

Low-resistance carpeting and other materials such as laminate flooring have been used throughout the airport to make it easier for people using wheelchairs and walkers to move throughout the airport. Elevators are large and allow for easy turning in a wheelchair and special wheelchairs designed to fit down aircraft aisles are used to assist with boarding and deplaning. Wheelchair lifts have been installed at aircraft gates.

"Visual pagers" are dedicated video monitors that are located throughout the airport and convey important information to travellers who have hearing impairments.

Various types of flooring are used throughout the terminal and function as a textured guide to assist travellers in identifying their location within the airport. In areas with tile, patterns in the tile help to identify exits. Tactile maps are also available at customer service counters throughout the airport, and braille and tactile lettering are used throughout the airport to indicate building features such as washrooms.

=== Green Coat ambassadors ===
Vancouver Airport Authority was one of the first airports in North America to institute a volunteer program in 1989. Volunteers in a green vest or jacket are deployed around the airport to provide information and customer service, serving as the "eyes and ears" for various partners in the airport community between the hours of 6 am and 10 pm every day. Volunteers are given basic training in airport operations and undertake many of the similar trainings mandated to airport employees. Each volunteer is required to obtain a transportation security clearance and carry a restricted area identification card to access the restricted and sterile areas of the terminal.

=== Sustainability programs ===
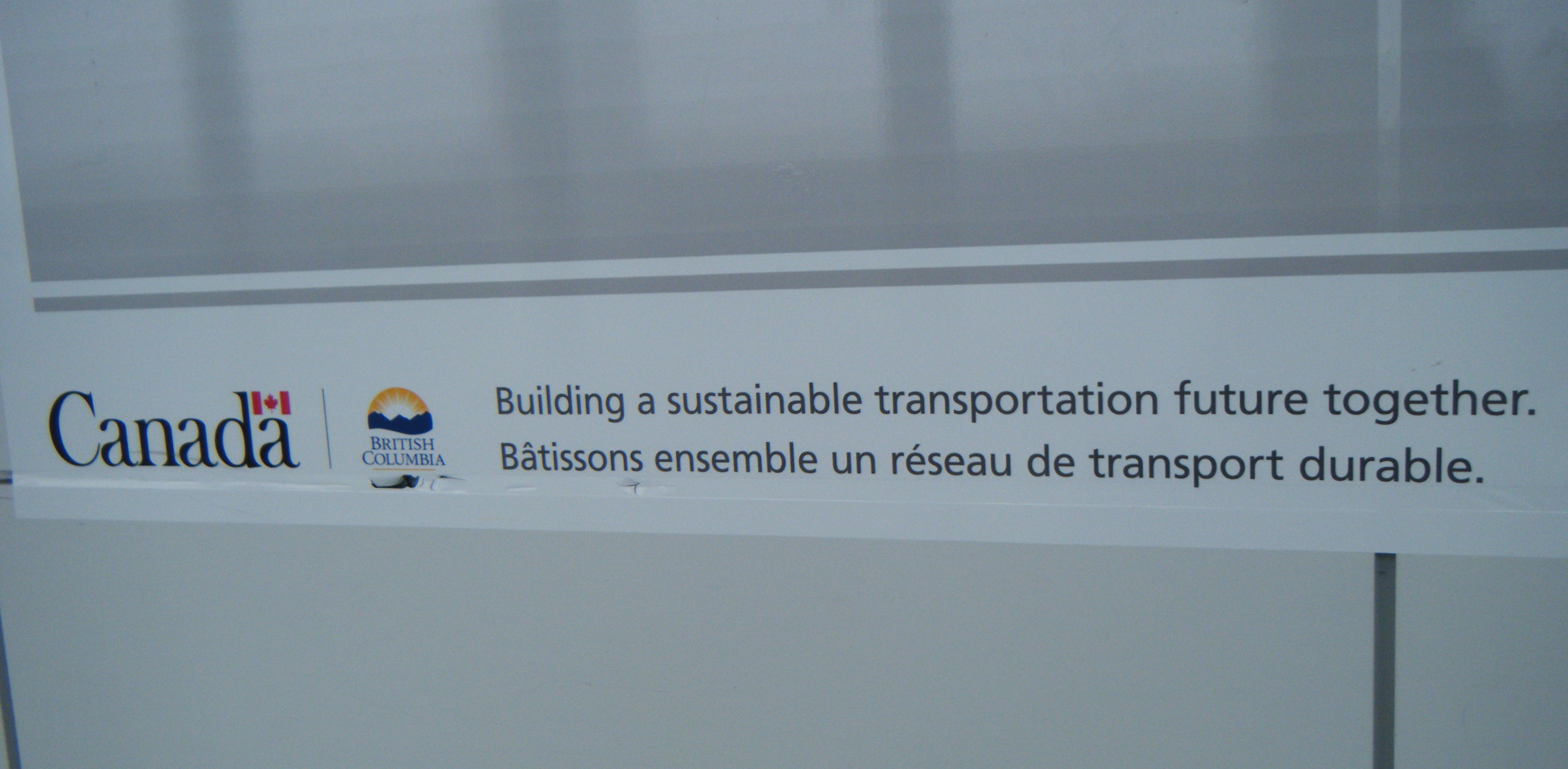
YVR Sustainability

YVR Sustainability is an operations department at Vancouver International Airport that is concerned with airport green initiatives. It focuses on green initiatives to reduce the environmental impact of the airport's operations. YVR's sustainability is also known for its green art linked to the environment and community and its indoor nature displays.

YVR's Vancouver Airport Services created an energy reduction committee in 1999 to create new energy-reducing initiatives, including improved efficiency of baggage conveyor belts to shut down conveyors when no bags are present; installing carbon dioxide sensors to adjust HVAC systems to the number of people in an area; and regulating electrical power for flight information display monitors when no flights are scheduled. In 2005, the committee installed LED lighting on several taxiways and more efficient, brighter lights on Levels 2 and 3 of the car parking structure, upgrades to the chilled water distribution system, and replacement of all Airport Authority computer equipment with newer, more efficient models." The building and lighting system are designed to utilize as much daylight as possible so that it is the primary lighting source. The Committee claims to have saved more than 24 gigawatt hours of electricity and $5.5 million since the team's creation.

In 2015, the airport set a goal for 50% of the ground support equipment to run on electric power by the year 2020. This goal was achieved early, as by late 2019, 53% of these machines operated on electric power. The airport installed 50 charging stations to support this operation. The airport also has a comprehensive fleet management plan, to ensure that ground support equipment operators maintain and electrify the fleet of the right size. They also have eight battery electric apron buses to support the operation of aircraft on remote stands separate from the terminal building.

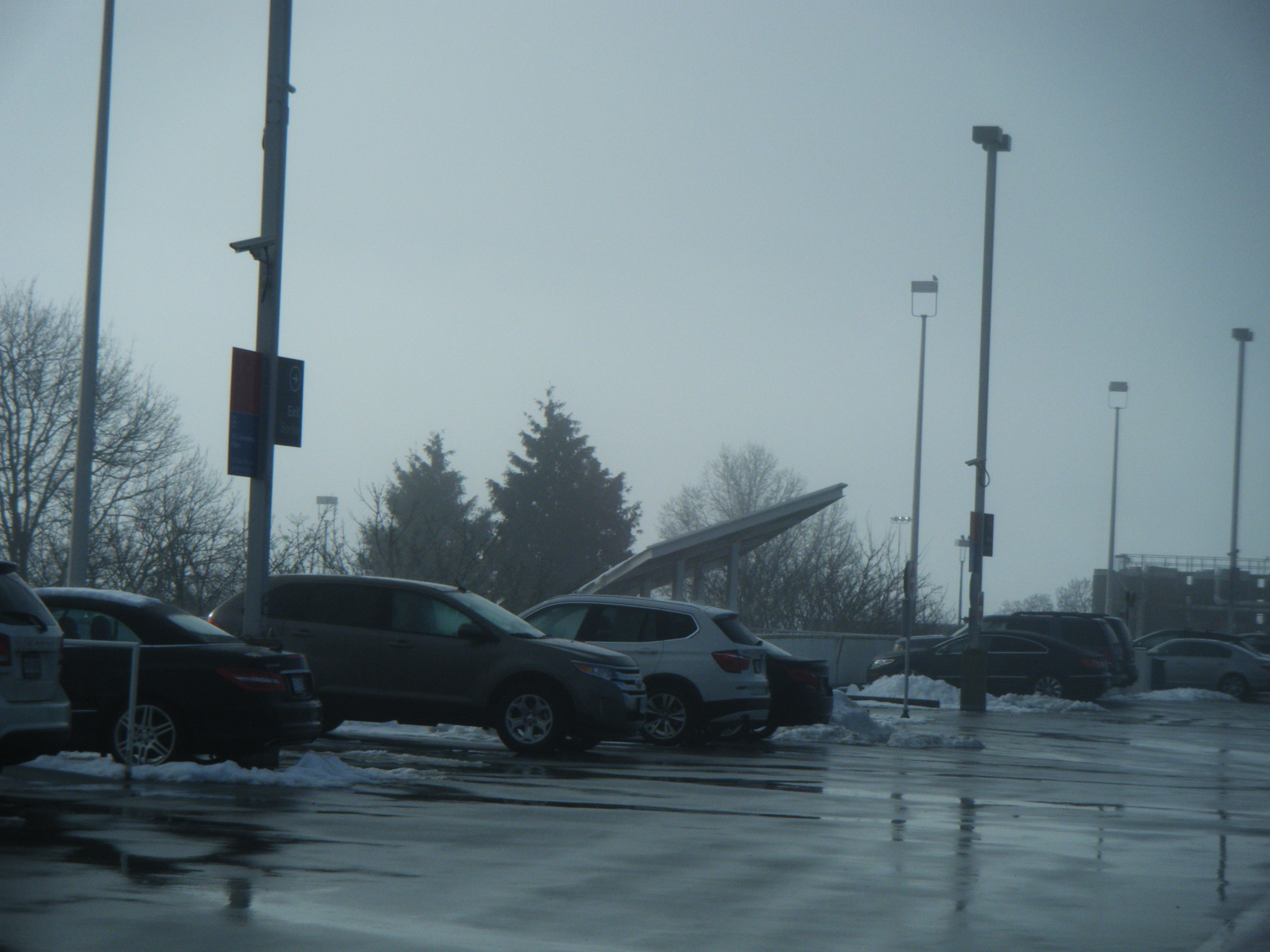
Solar panel located in YVR rooftop parking lot

The solar-powered hot water systems were installed in the airport's Domestic and International terminals in 2003. The 100 solar panels were placed on the roof of the YVR building and will heat more than 800 gallons of water each hour. This has resulted in approximately $110,000 and 8569 gigajoules saved each year. The project was partly funded by BC Hydro working with the Vancouver International Airport Authority to reduce energy consumption and costs at YVR. YVR also uses nightly energy set backs, carbon dioxide sensors, and improved scheduling and system tune-ups since 2001 which has led to a decrease of 25 per cent in natural gas usage.

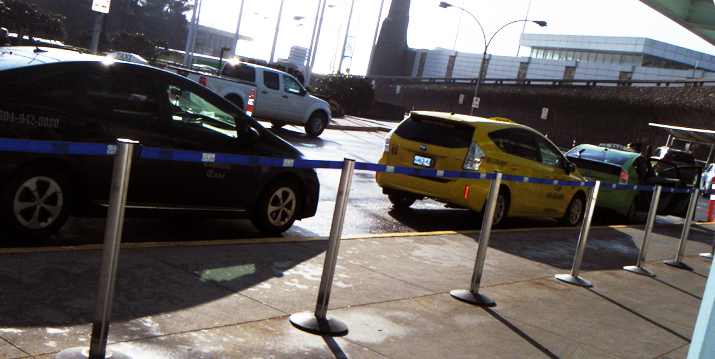
Loading area for taxis at YVR

YVR has 100 hybrid and natural gas-operated taxis hired to pick up and drop off passengers. The Airport Authority created a program in 2004 that gave incentive for alternative fuel taxis and was successful by improving the average fleet fuel economy by 47% by 2009. YVR has 450 recycling containers evenly distributed and located around its terminals, divided for recycling plastic and paper. The containers themselves are made from recycled aluminum, steel and plastic and help recycle over 1,250,000 kg of material each year.

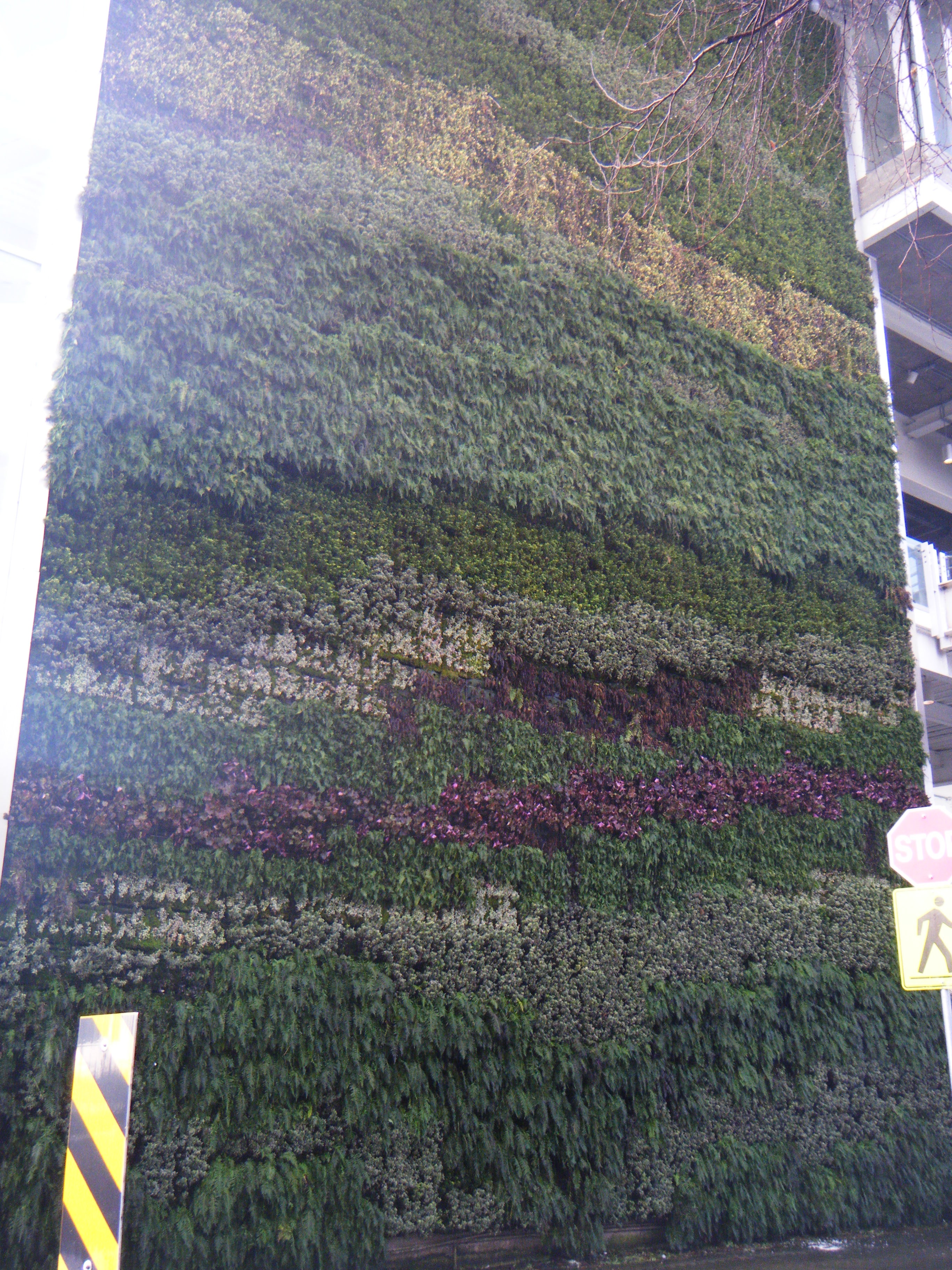
Green wall close up at YVR

In June 2009, YVR had a green wall installed by the Canada Line YVR–Airport Station and can best be viewed from the International Departures terminal on Level 3 and from the International Arrivals terminal on Level 2. This is the first Canadian airport with a living green wall and the largest in North America. The green wall measures "18-metres high and 12 -metres wide and is home to 28,249 individual plants on 2,173 panels and houses a built-in irrigation and feeding system." The plants it consists of are Euonymus japonicus microphyllus, Euonymus japonicus albovariegatus microphyllus, Polypodium glycyrrhiza, and Ophiopogon japonicus nanus. Benefits of a green wall on the building include improving air quality, reducing noise pollution (the green wall is located near the Sky Train), cooling the area down and saving on energy costs, and decreases carbon dioxide emissions in the environment. YVR includes other environmental indoor installations such as its indoor garden, aquarium, and a freshwater creek. The 30,000 gallon salt water aquarium at YVR is home to about 850 samples of British Columbia marine life. There is also a 750-gallon jellyfish tank and a 60-metre long fresh water creek located nearby.

The YVR Fuel project plans to build an underground pipeline and upgrade an airport fuel terminal near the Fraser River. In 2014, the YVR Fuel Project was granted approval with 64 conditions. An information bulletin posted by the Ministry of Environment of British Columbia announced that the project is "not expected to result in any significant adverse effects, based on the mitigation measures and conditions of the Environmental Assessment Certificate." Nonetheless, the YVR Airport Fuel Facilities will have to carry out the project in accordance to the conditions made by the Environmental Assessment Office. Key conditions deal with spill and fire prevention, preparedness and response, cleaning, inspection, dealing with pollution liabilities, environmental remediation, and compensating for Aboriginal loss under the Fisheries Act. Marine pilots will have to be specially trained for the river's environment, tankers double-hulled, pre-screened and each boat will have to have two tugs. The reason for the YVR fuel upgrade is because the Fuel Facilities Corp. states the current fuel-delivery system is not sustainable and too dependent on an older pipeline coming from Burnaby, British Columbia and shipments from Washington state. With its own fuel, YVR will have more room and independence to welcome new flights and airlines.

The Vancouver International Airport Security submitted a 2009-2013 Noise Management Plan to the Canadian Ministry of Transport in August 2013 which was reviewed and approved. This Management Plan included initiatives to help with noise complaints that YVR Security had received. A total of 16 initiatives were identified and are outlined in the Noise Management Plan. The plan is flexible and allows room for new community issues that may arise within the five-year program. The plan's main goal is to balance the needs of having 24-hour airport services while minimizing noise disturbances associated with aircraft services for those living nearby.

=== Operation Yellow Ribbon ===
Following the September 11 attacks, the airspace over the United States was shut down. Aircraft over the North Atlantic and Pacific bound for the United States were therefore diverted to Canadian airports. Vancouver International Airport accommodated 34 of these flights (the third highest amount, after Halifax and Gander), amounting to a total of 8,500 passengers coming from Asia and the Pacific to destinations on the West Coast of the United States and points beyond, being the only major Canadian airport on the West Coast that had the capability of handling trans-Pacific aircraft.

The airport won the 2001 Airport Management Award from the BC Aviation Council and was cited for overcoming many challenges in a professional and compassionate way.

== Emergency services ==
YVR Fire & Rescue is the primary fire service at the airport, responding to aircraft emergencies as well as medical and environmental emergencies on airport property. The airport fire station has seven Oshkosh Striker ARFF crash trucks, a Pierce Arrow XT Engine, and an F-550 medical truck that are owned by the Vancouver Airport Authority. Richmond Fire has additional resources when required from Richmond Fire Hall #4 (Sea Island) at 3900 Russ Baker Way, as well as the Canadian Coast Guard.

Policing at the airport is provided by the Royal Canadian Mounted Police Richmond detachment. Airport emergency health services are provided by the British Columbia Ambulance Service, with Station 270 providing a dedicated bike squad for rapid EMS response to passengers and staff. In addition, BCAS air ambulance Station 280 is located near the YVR South Terminal, providing air ambulance service with two Sikorsky S-76 helicopters, two Beechcraft Super King Air turboprop aircraft, and one Cessna Citation Bravo jet.

== Accidents and incidents ==
- On February 7, 1968, a Canadian Pacific Airlines Boeing 707 overran a runway and hit two buildings, vehicles, and parked aircraft while landing in heavy fog, killing one crew member and one person on the ground.
- On March 1, 1970, Vickers Viscount CF-THY of Air Canada collided in mid-air with an Ercoupe 415 CF-SHN on approach to Vancouver International Airport. The Ercoupe pilot was killed.
- On June 23, 1985, two pieces of unauthorized luggage containing bombs were checked in at the airport and loaded onto Canadian Pacific Airlines Flight 60 to Toronto and Canadian Pacific Airlines Flight 3 to Tokyo respectively. Upon exploding, the Flight 60 luggage killed all 329 on board Air India Flight 182, and the Flight 3 luggage, intended for Air India Flight 301, exploded at Tokyo Narita International Airport, killing two baggage handlers.
- On August 19, 1995, Douglas C-47B (DC-3) C-GZOF of Air North crashed during an emergency return to the airport, killing one of the three crew. The aircraft was on a ferry flight to Prince Rupert Airport when the starboard propeller went into overspeed and the decision was made to return to Vancouver International.
- On October 19, 1995, a Canadian Airlines McDonnell Douglas DC-10 aborted takeoff on runway 26 (now 26L) two seconds after the V_{1} call. The aircraft ended up in the soft ground west of the end of runway, causing the failure of the nose gear. All 243 passengers and 14 crew escaped with no more than minor injuries.
- During the September 11 attacks, an Air China Boeing 747 from Beijing to San Francisco, was escorted by two US F-15s onto the airport's north runway during Operation Yellow Ribbon, apparently following a communication problem.
- On October 14, 2007, a Polish immigrant, Robert Dziekanski, died after being shot with a taser by the Royal Canadian Mounted Police at the airport. Dziekański, who did not speak English, became agitated after waiting approximately 10 hours at the arrivals hall because he could not find his mother. While police were attempting to take Dziekanski into custody he was tased by officers and subsequently died. The subsequent Braidwood Inquiry began in May 2008. In June 2010, the judge found that the use of the taser was not justified. The RCMP issued an apology to Dziekanski's mother. The commission also found that tasers have the capability to injure or kill by causing heart irregularities, especially where the individual is medically or emotionally compromised.
- On October 19, 2007, at approximately 4:10 pm, a Piper Seneca bound for Pitt Meadows Airport took off from YVR and crashed into a nearby apartment building in Richmond. The pilot was the sole occupant of the plane. He was killed in the crash. Two others were injured, both of whom were in the apartment building at the time.
- On September 18, 2008, in the afternoon, an Air Canada Airbus A340 collided with an Air Canada Jazz Dash 8 aircraft. The Jazz flight was taxiing on the runway when it collided. The Air Canada flight was bound for Hong Kong. Both aircraft received damage but there were no injuries or fatalities.
- On July 9, 2009, at approximately 10:08 pm, a Piper Navajo airplane originating from Victoria crashed into an industrial area in Richmond, British Columbia. The two pilots were killed. It was owned and operated by Canadian Air Charters and was carrying units of blood for Canadian Blood Services at the time. Officials say that wake turbulence was the main cause of the crash. Fatigue, along with diminished depth perception in darkness, was also a factor.
- On October 27, 2011, a Northern Thunderbird Air Beechcraft King Air 100 attempted to land on the south runway but missed by about 900 metres (3,000 ft), hitting a lamppost and a car, then crashing on the nearby intersection on Russ Baker Way and Gilbert Road at the west end of the Dinsmore Bridge. There were seven passengers and two crew members on board; only the pilot was confirmed dead at 9:00 pm that evening, while the others survived with various injuries. Two on the ground were also injured. On November 16, 2011, the copilot of the flight died in hospital.
- On May 9, 2021, a 28-year-old man was fatally shot outside the international terminal. The Integrated Homicide Investigation Team said the shooting was targeted and linked to ongoing Lower Mainland gang conflict in Metro Vancouver. Richmond RCMP pursued a suspect vehicle from the terminal to Lulu Island, where the suspects reportedly shot at police. The vehicle was later found burned-out in Surrey.
- On November 19, 2024, an Amazon Air Boeing 767-300F operated by Cargojet Airways overran the north runway and slid into the grass while landing around 1:45 am, causing substantial damage to the aircraft. No one was injured.
- On July 15, 2025, a Cessna 172 owned by the Victoria Flying Club was "hijacked" upon departure from Victoria International Airport. Around 1:10 pm, the aircraft entered the airport's airspace for around 30 minutes, shutting down the airport and diverting arrivals. The lone occupant of the plane was arrested upon landing at YVR.
