= Bella Coola Music Festival =

The Bella Coola Music Festival takes place in the month of July in Bella Coola, British Columbia, Canada. It offers a variety of music: roots, rock, world, blues, folk and more.

== History ==
The Festival began in 1998.
