= List of airlines of British Columbia =

This is a list of airlines of British Columbia which have an air operator's certificate issued by Transport Canada, the country's civil aviation authority. These are airlines that are based in British Columbia.

== Current airlines ==
Airline	Image	IATA	ICAO	Callsign	Hub airport(s) or headquarters	Notes
Cascadia Air			CBF	BIGFOOT	Campbell River	Scheduled Service, Air Taxi and charter
Central Mountain Air		9M	GLR	GLACIER	Smithers	Regional, charters
CHC Helicopter			HMB	HUMMINGBIRD	Vancouver International Airport, Richmond	Helicopter charters, flight training
Cloud Air					Lake Muskoka/Mortimer's Point	Floatplane, scheduled passenger service, charters, flight training
Corilair					Campbell River	Charters and scheduled floatplane
Flair Airlines		F8	FLE	FLAIR	Kelowna	Ultra-low-cost-carrier
Harbour Air Seaplanes		H3	HES	HARBOUR EXPRESS	Vancouver Harbour	Scheduled passenger service, charters
Helijet		JB	JBA	HELIJET	Vancouver	Scheduled passenger service, charters
KF Cargo		KW	KFA	FLIGHTCRAFT	Kelowna	Scheduled passenger service, cargo Charter airline. Along with Canadian Helicopters, Atlantis Systems International and Canadian Base Operators operates KF Defence Programs.
Northern Thunderbird Air			NTA	THUNDERBIRD	Prince George	Scheduled passenger service, charters
Ocean Air Floatplanes					Victoria Water	Floatplane charters. Purchased Pat Bay Air in March 2015 and was fully integrated.
Pacific Coastal Airlines		8P	PCO	PASCO	Vancouver	Scheduled passenger service, charters
Salt Spring Air			101	SALTSPRING	Ganges	Floatplane, scheduled passenger service, charters
Seair Seaplanes			SS1	SEAIR	Vancouver Water	Floatplane, scheduled passenger service, charters
Tofino Air			25	TOFINO AIR	Tofino Harbour	Scheduled passenger service, charters
Vancouver Island Air					Campbell River	Seaplane, scheduled passenger service, charters
VIH Helicopters					Saanich, British Columbia	Charters, MEDIVAC (air ambulance), aerial firefighting Example colours only; aircraft now different type.
West Coast Air		8O	YWZ	COAST AIR	Vancouver Harbour	Floatplanes, scheduled passenger service, charters

== Defunct airlines ==
Airline	Image	IATA	ICAO	Callsign	Hub airport(s) or headquarters	Notes
Air BC					Vancouver	1980 - 2002; To Air Canada Jazz
Air Southwest					Chilliwack	1983 - 2005
Airspeed Aviation					Abbotsford	1986 - 2009; Sold to Orca Airways
Baxter Aviation		6B			Nanaimo Harbour	1985 - 2007; Sold to West Coast Air
BCWest Air					Abbotsford	2007 - 2008; Ended in October 2008 due to unresolved shareholder dispute
Canadian Pacific Air Lines		CP	CPC	EMPRESS	Vancouver	1942 - 1987; Also known as CP Air, to Canadian Airlines International, the callsign is still used by Canadian North
Harmony Airways		HQ	HMY	HARMONY	Vancouver	2002 - 2007
Hawkair		BH	BHA	HAWKAIR	Terrace and Kitimat	1994 - 2016; On November 18, 2016, Hawkair declared bankruptcy, had all assets seized for liquidation, and permanently suspended operations.
Island Express Air		1X	IAX	ABBY AIR	Abbotsford	2009-2020; Demise due to COVID-19 pandemic
KD Air		XC	KDC	KAY DEE	Vancouver	Ceased operations in 2019
Kootenay Direct Airlines					Nelson	Ceased operating in 2009
Orca Airways		OR	ORK	ORCA	Vancouver	Suspended by Transport Canada in 2018
Pacific Western Airlines		PA	PWA		Vancouver	1946 - 1987; To Canadian Airlines
Powell Air			PWL	POWELL AIR	Powell River	1975 - 1987; Merged with Air BC to form Pacific Coastal Airlines
Queen Charlotte Airlines					Vancouver Water	1946 - 1955; Sold to Pacific Western Airlines
Sonicblue Airways		VL			Vancouver	1982 - 2006
Trans-Provincial Airlines					Prince Rupert	? - 1993; Sold to Harbour Air
Western Express Airlines					Vancouver	1994 - 2006
