= List of seaplane operators =

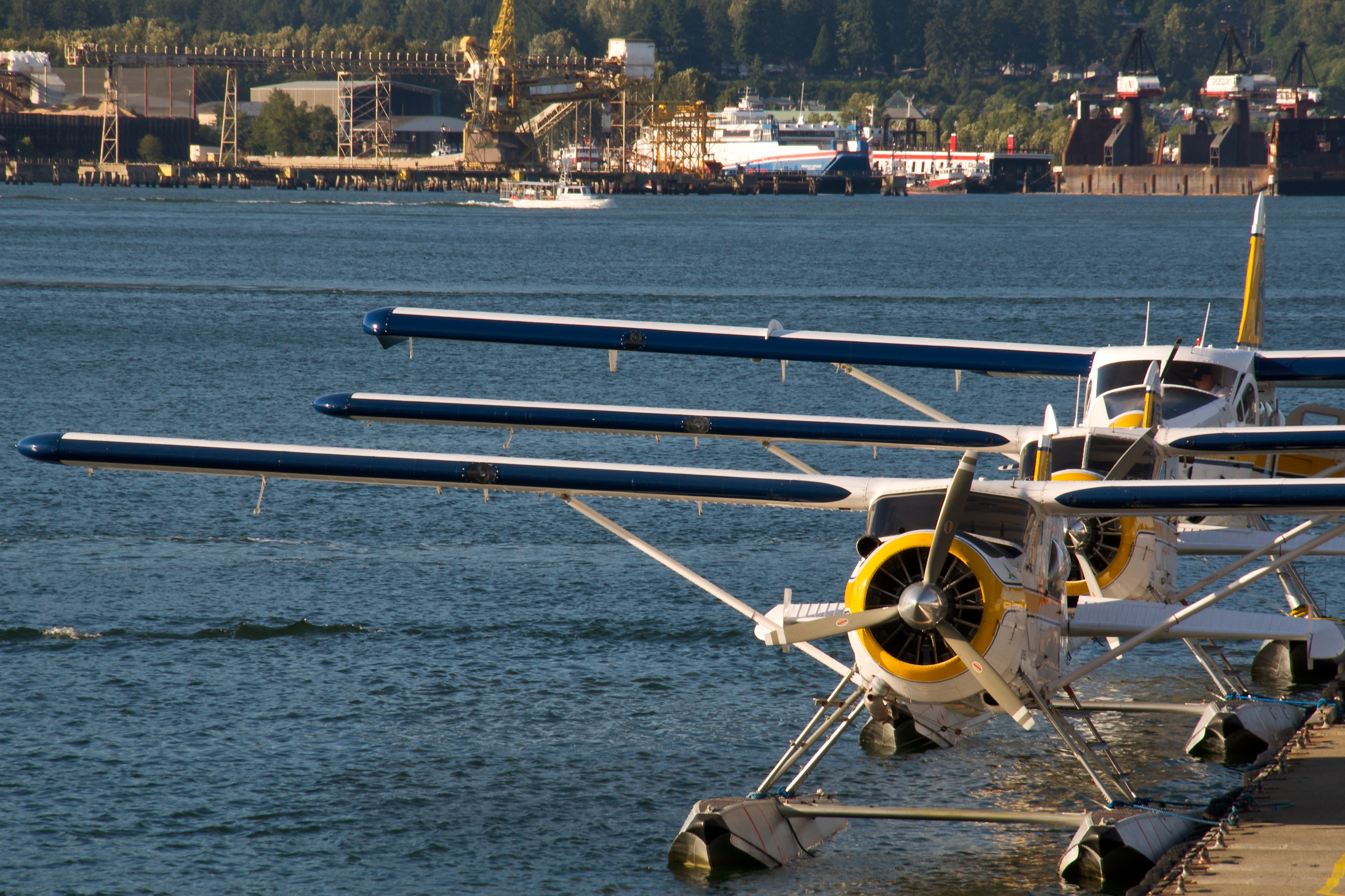
A lineup of Harbour Air Seaplanes: two DHC-2s and a DHC-3

This is a list of seaplane operators. A seaplane is a powered fixed-wing aircraft capable of taking off and landing (alighting) on water. Seaplanes that can also take off and land on airfields are a subclass called amphibious aircraft.

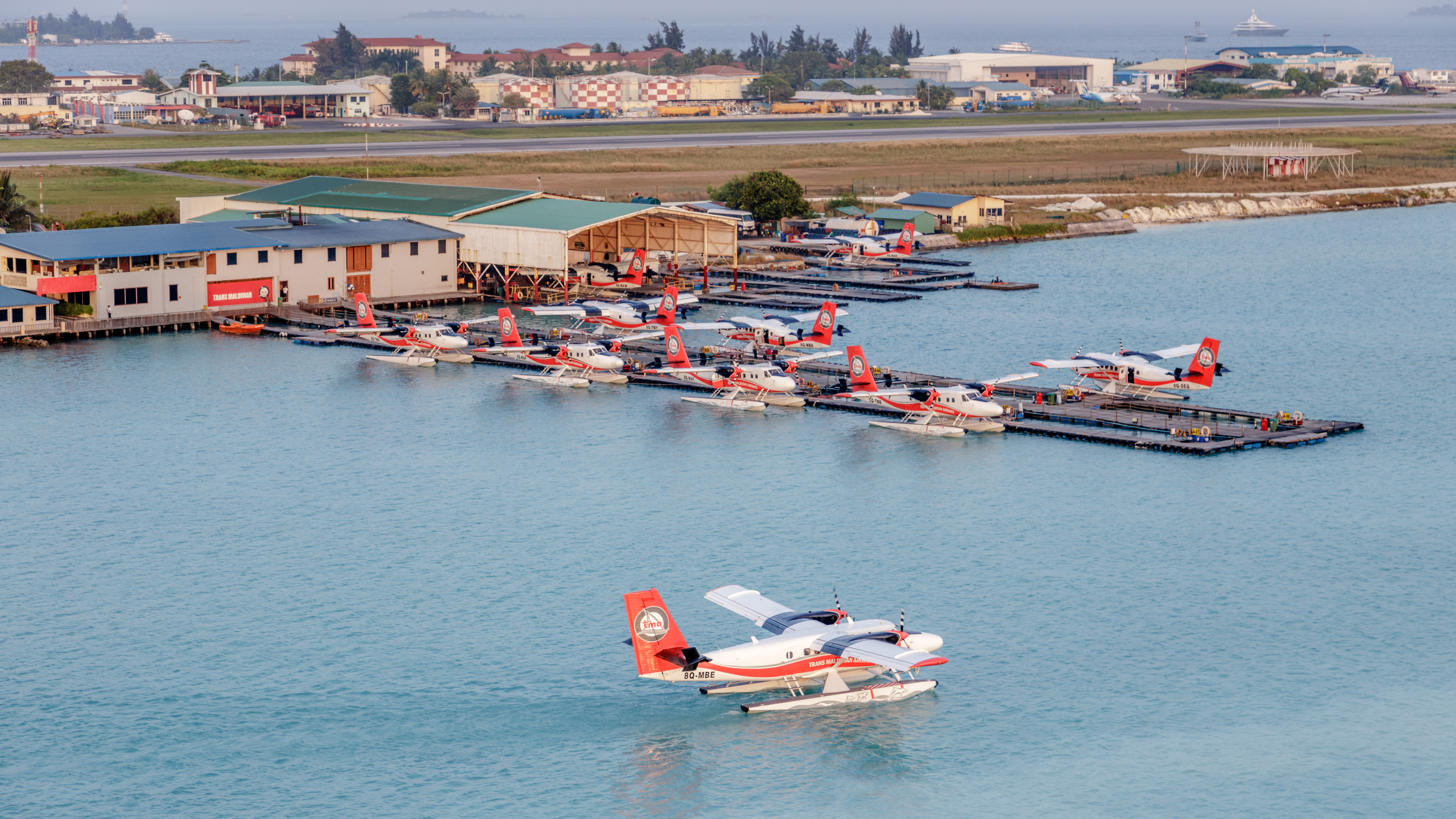
Trans Maldivian Airways base at Velana International Airport

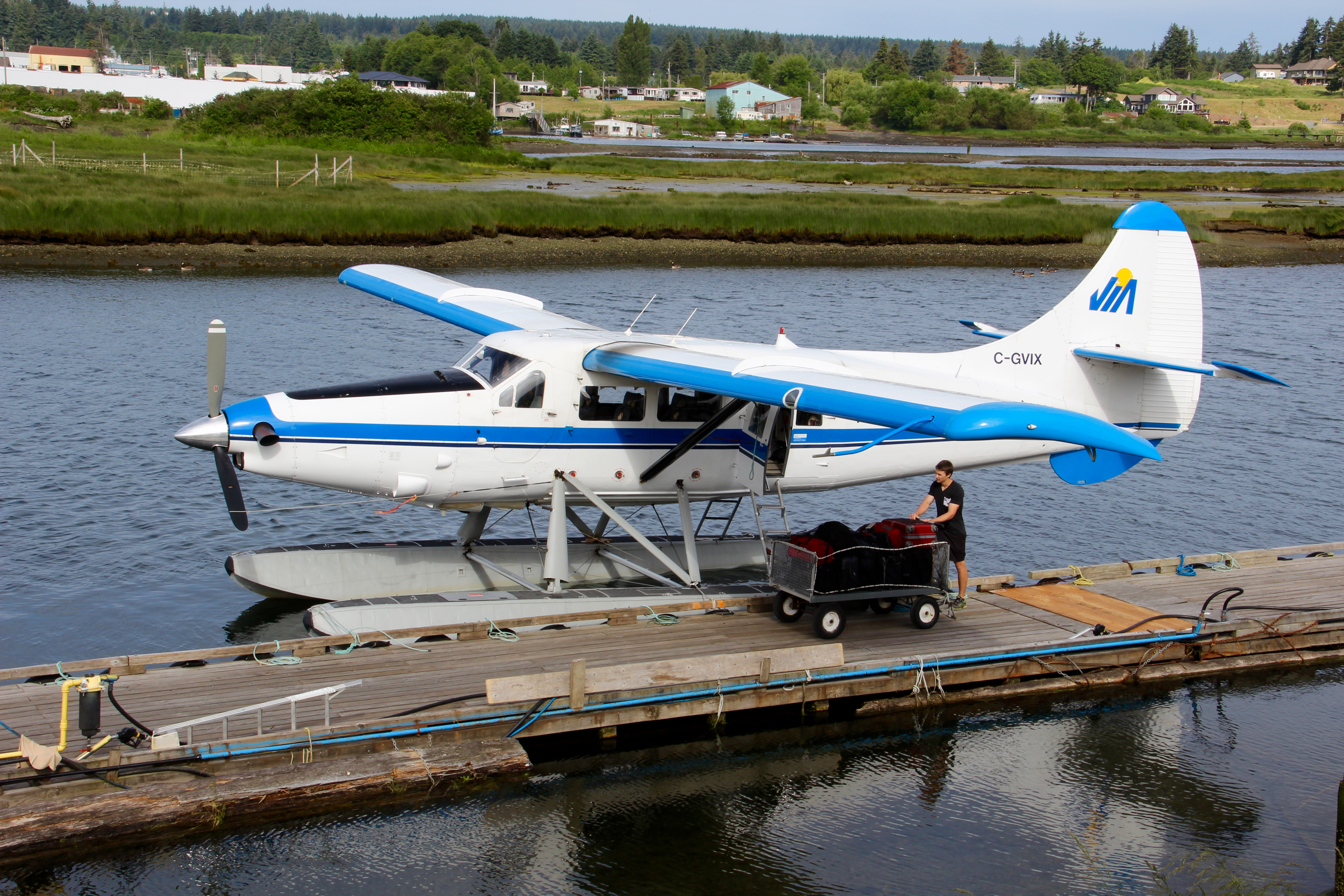
A Vancouver Island Air DHCT-3 Turbo Otter at Campbell River Water Aerodrome

Seawings Cessna 208 Caravan

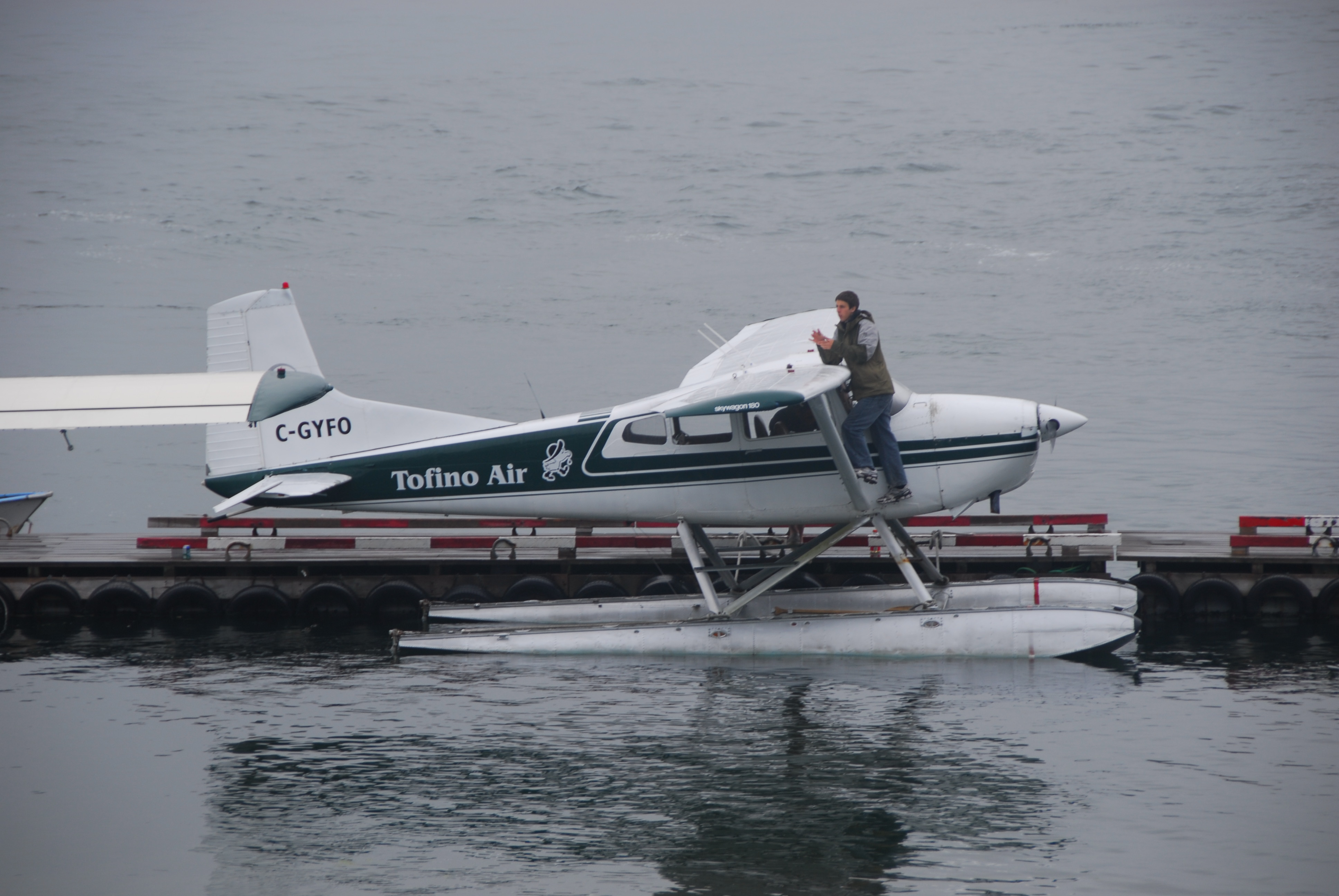
Tofino Air Cessna 180 at Tofino Harbour Water Aerodrome

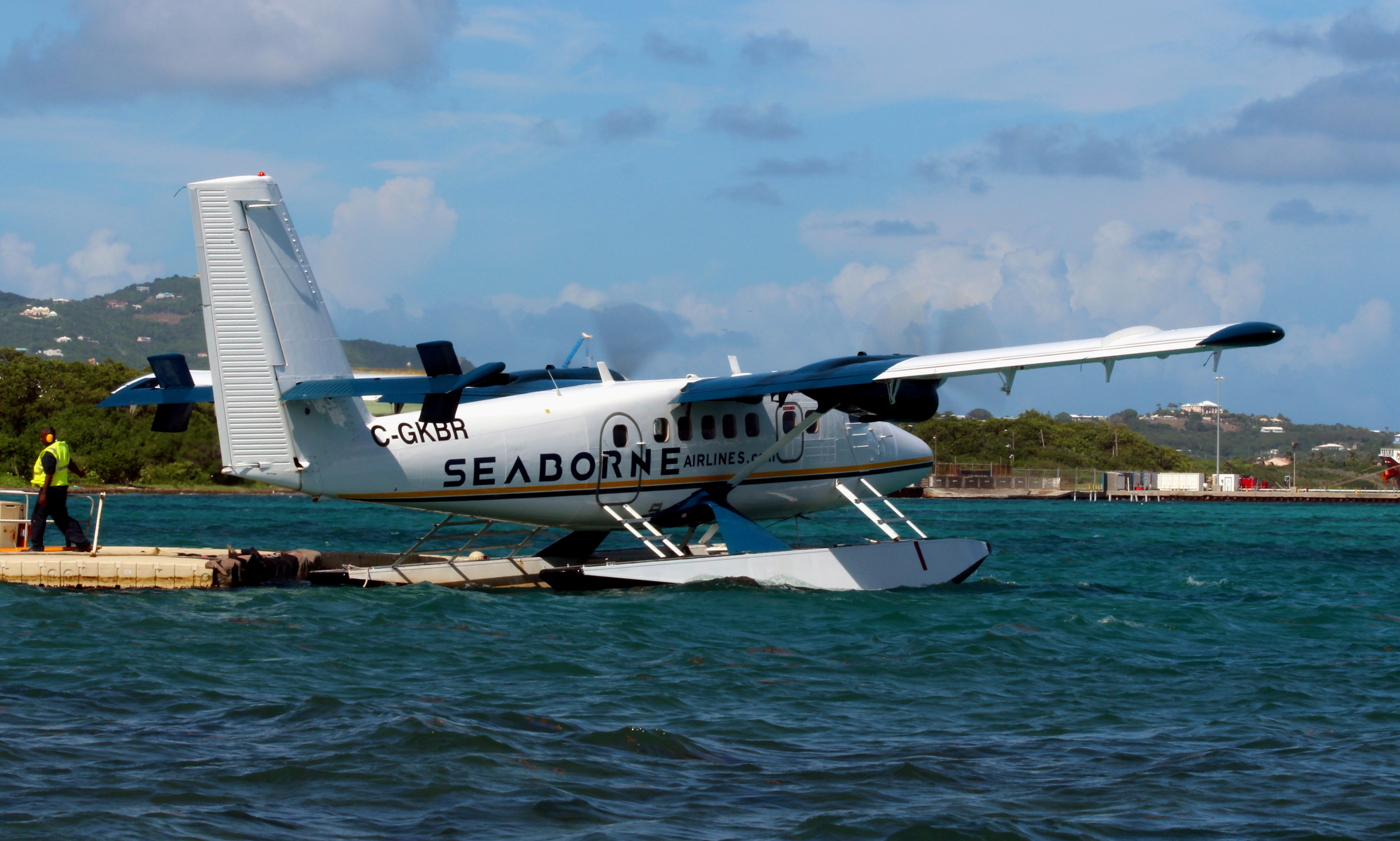
Seaborne Airlines Twin Otter at Christiansted Harbor Seaplane Base

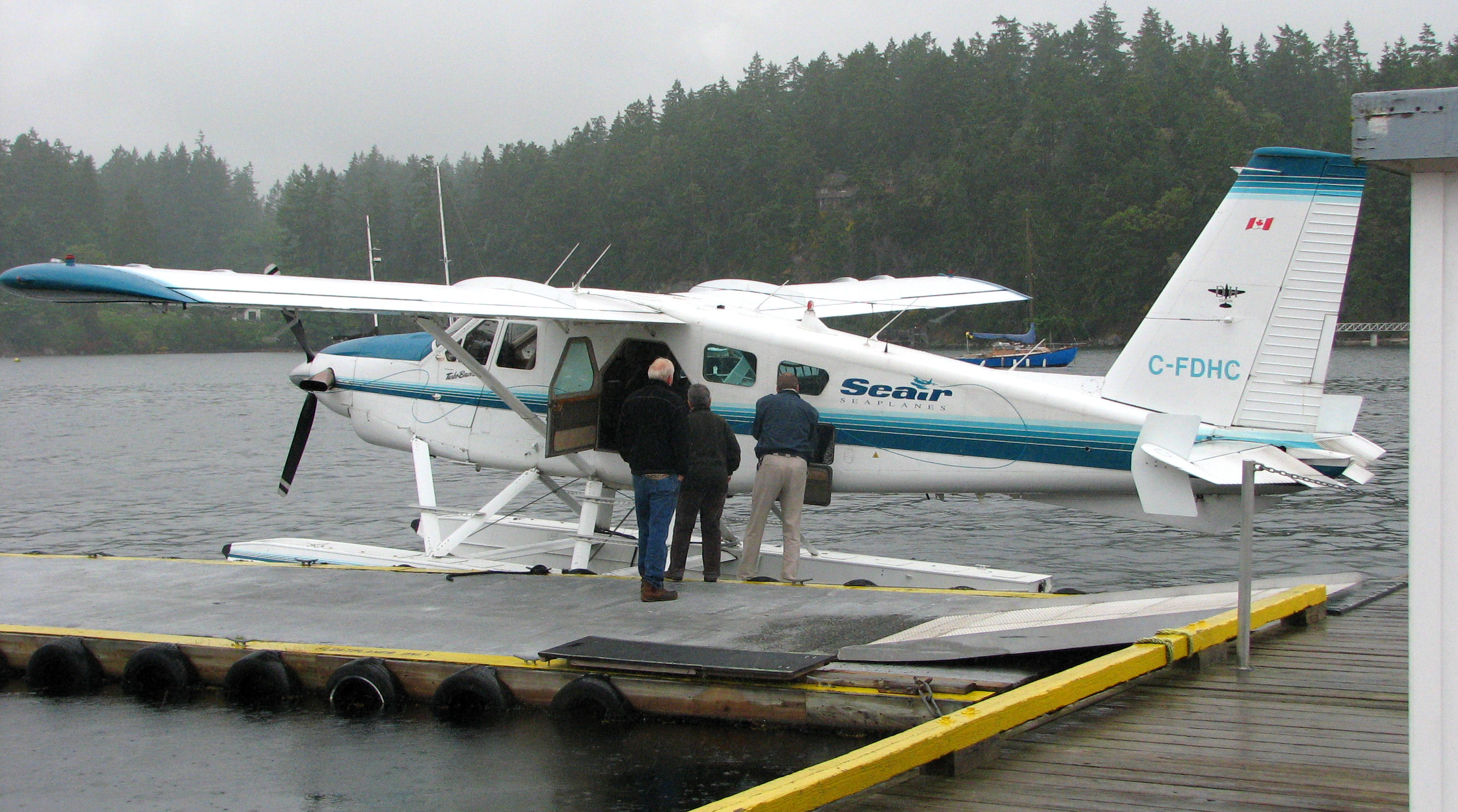
Seair Seaplanes DHC-2T Turbo-Beaver at Ganges Water Aerodrome

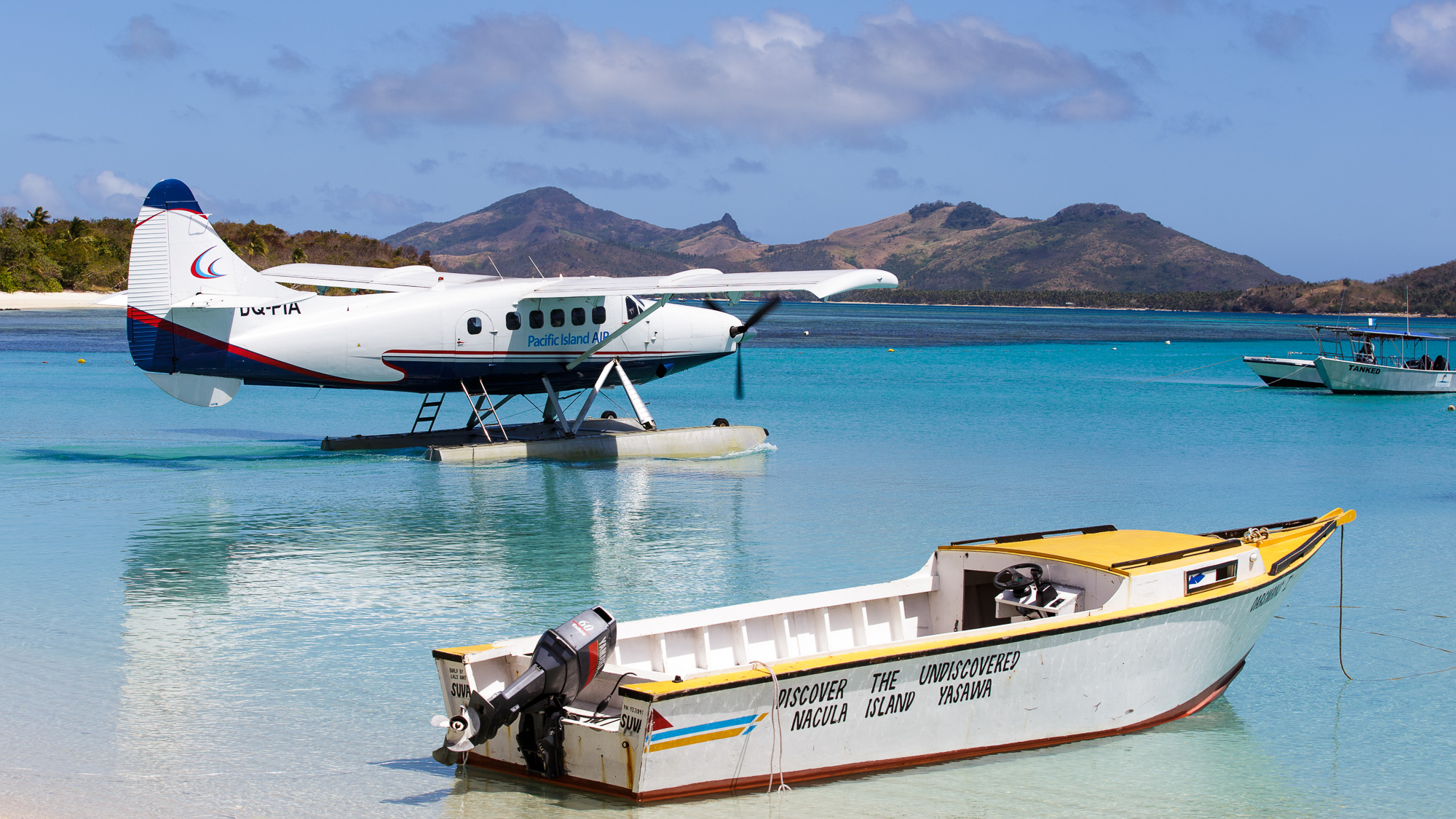
Pacific Island Air Turbo Otter taxiing at Nacula, Fiji

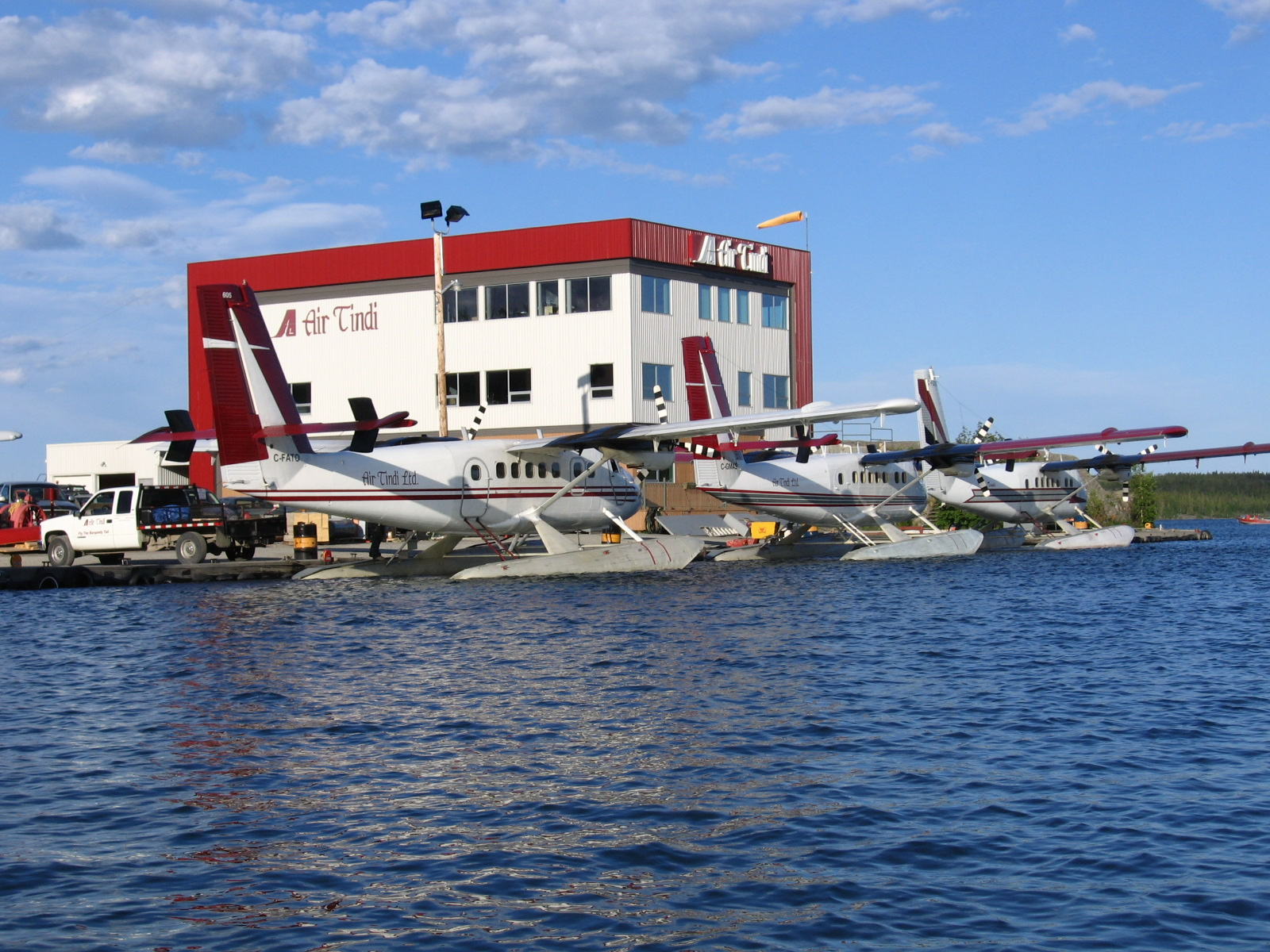
Three Air Tindi DHC-6 Twin Otters on floats at Yellowknife Water Aerodrome

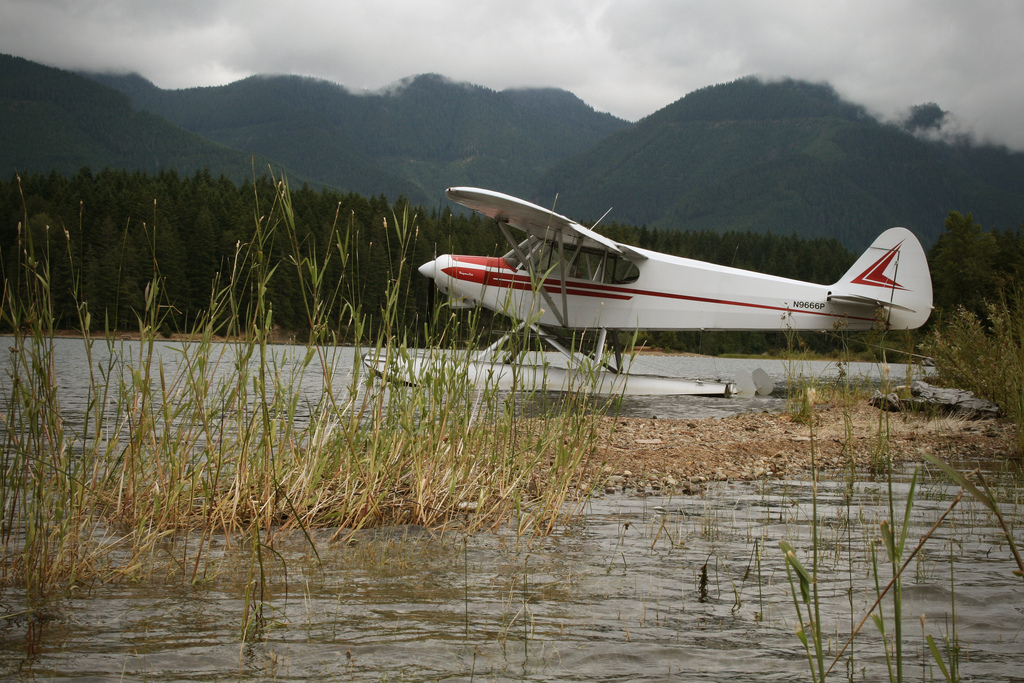
Piper SuperCub of Kenmore Air on Lake Cushman

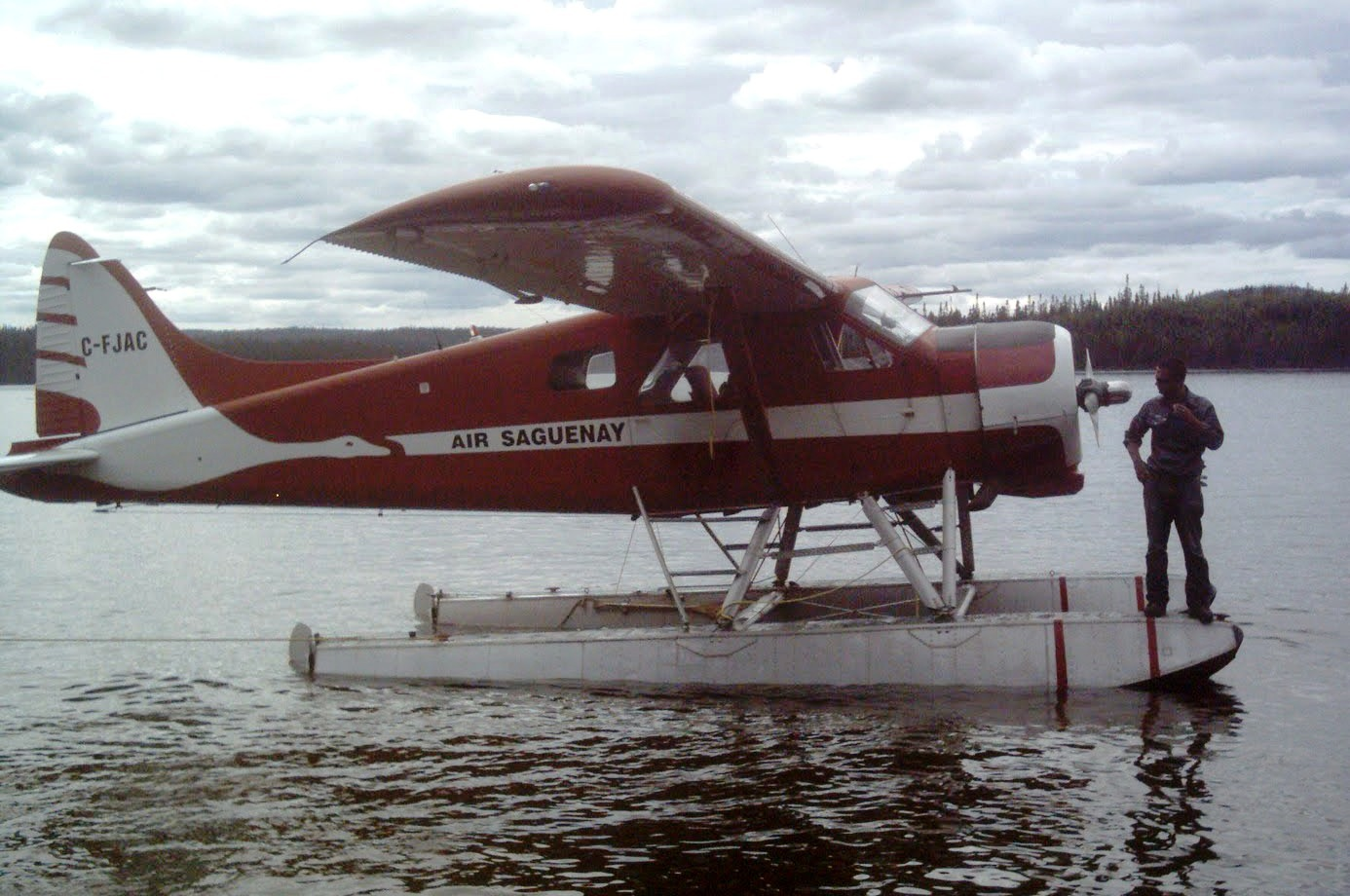
Air Saguenay de Havilland Canada DHC-2 Beaver on Lake Mirepoix (or Casinau) near Saguenay, Quebec

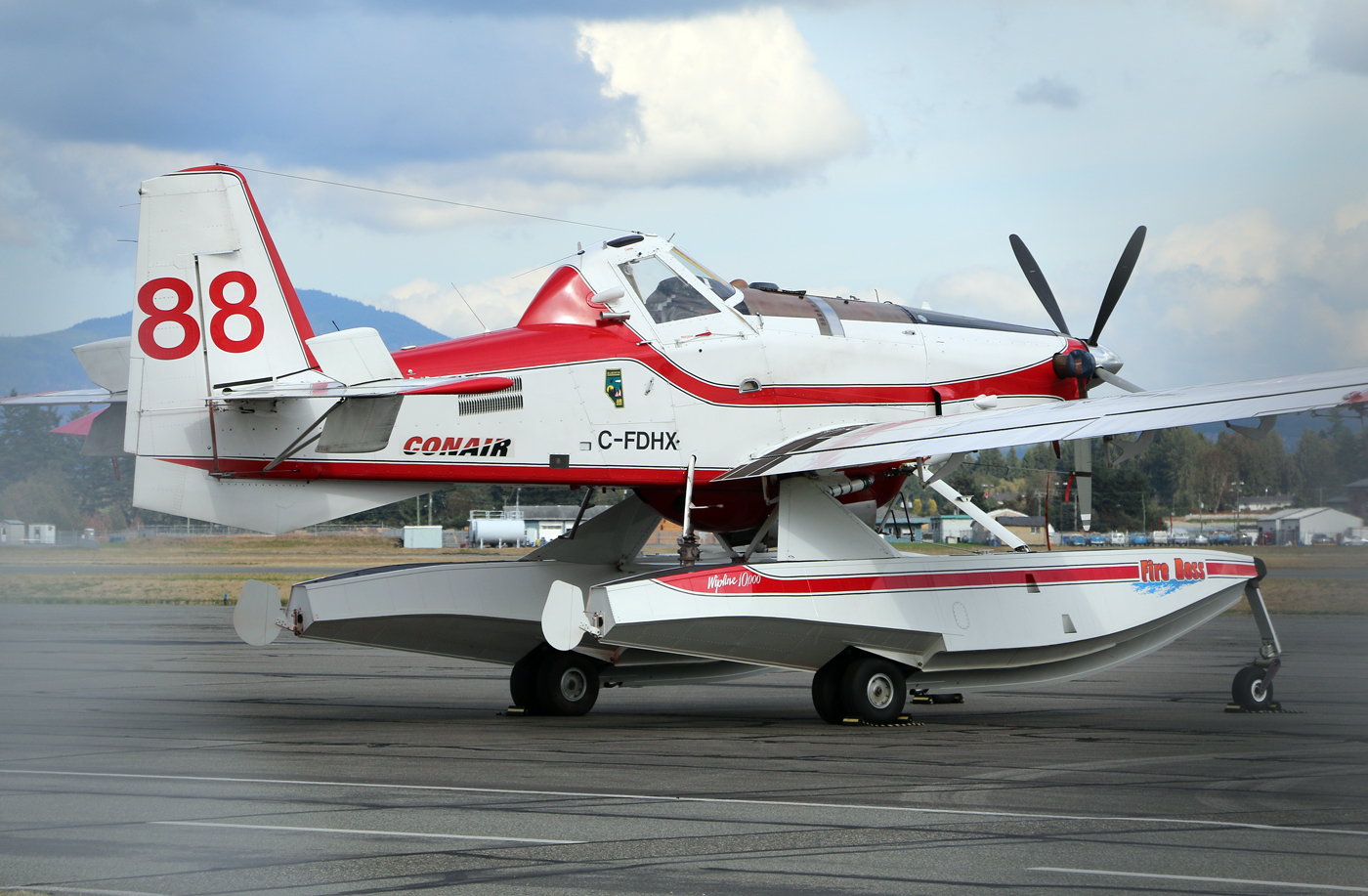
A Conair Group Air Tractor at Abbotsford International Airport

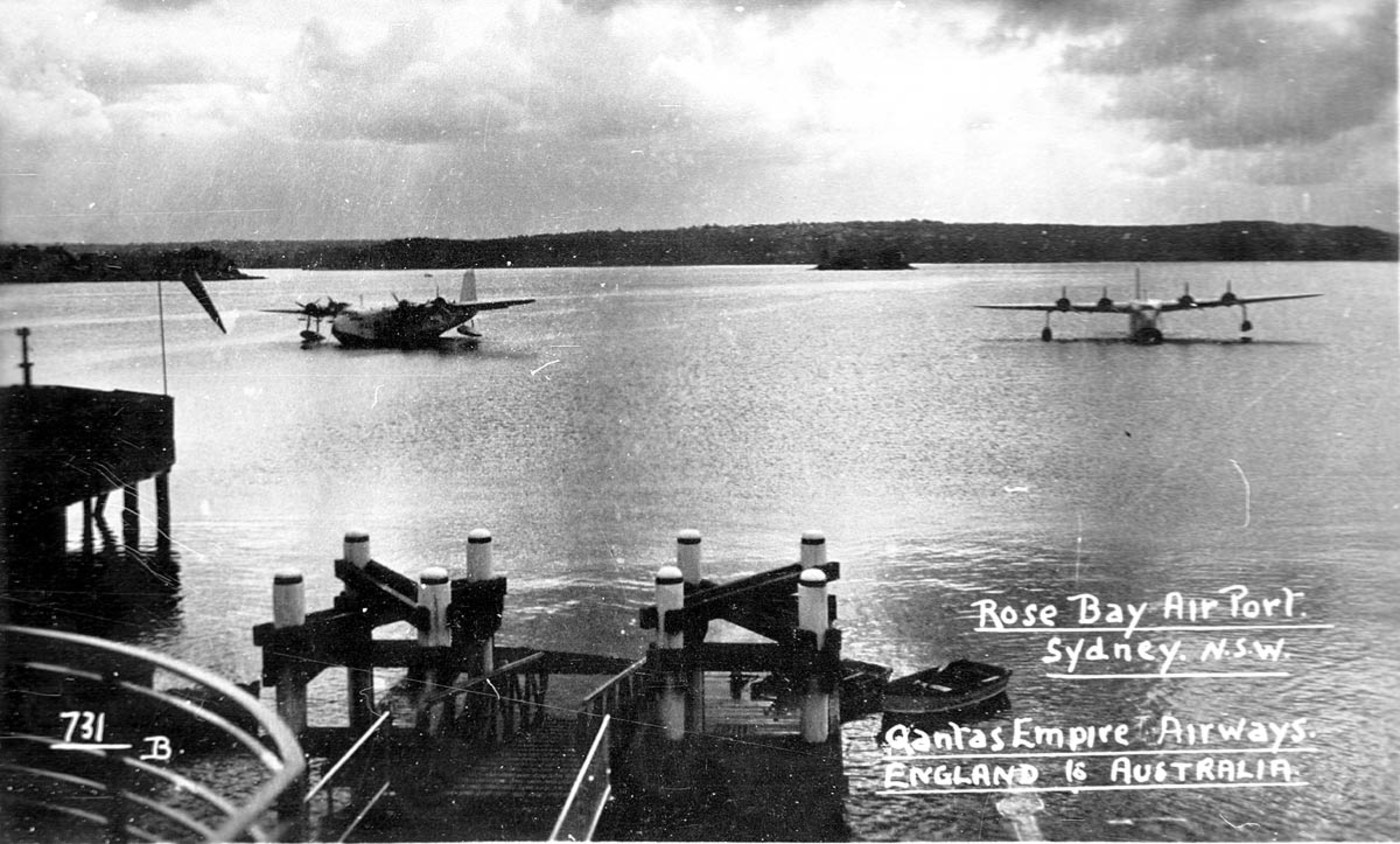
Qantas Empire Airways flying boats at Rose Bay, New South Wales

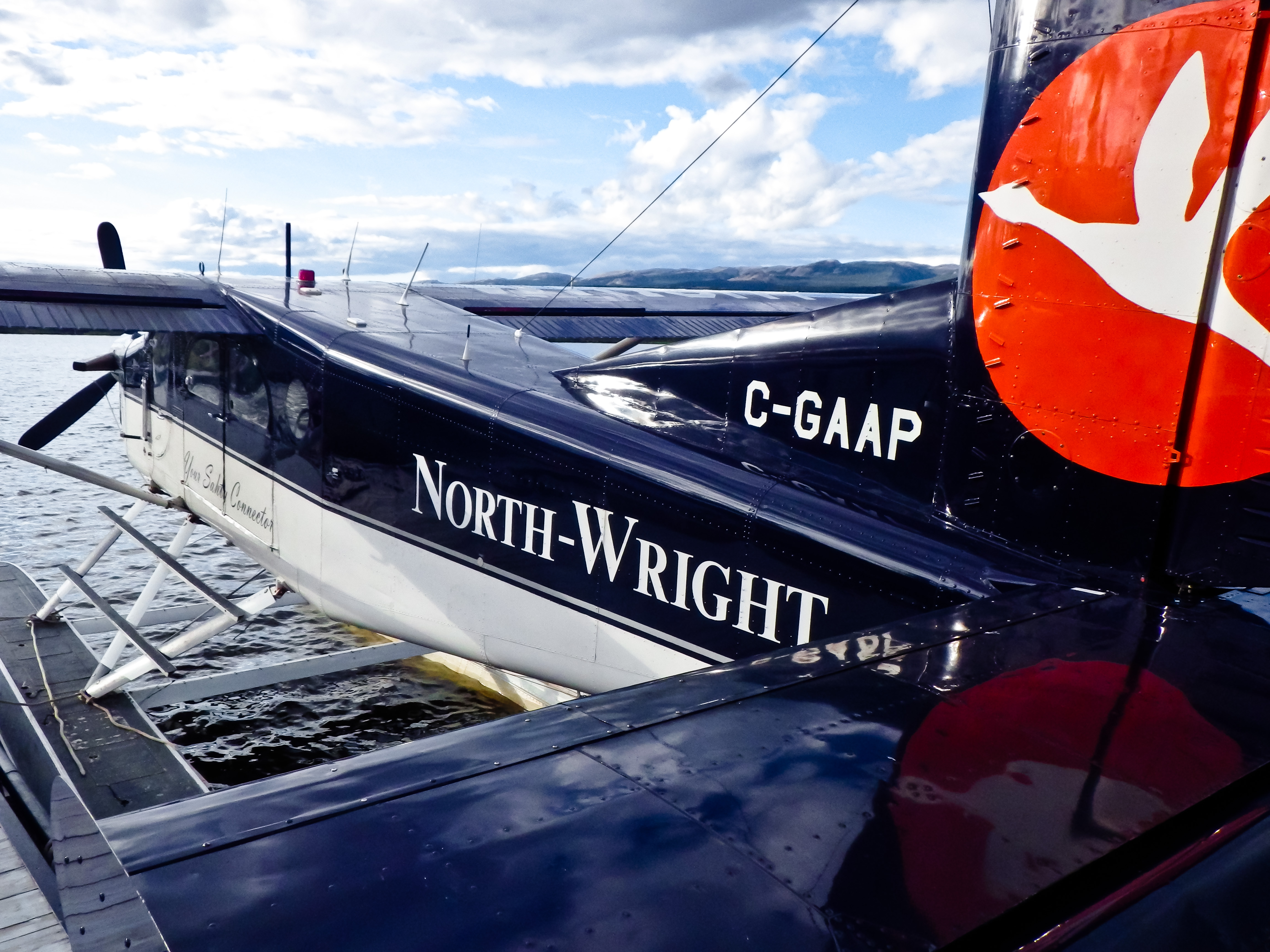
A North-Wright Airways Pilatus Porter

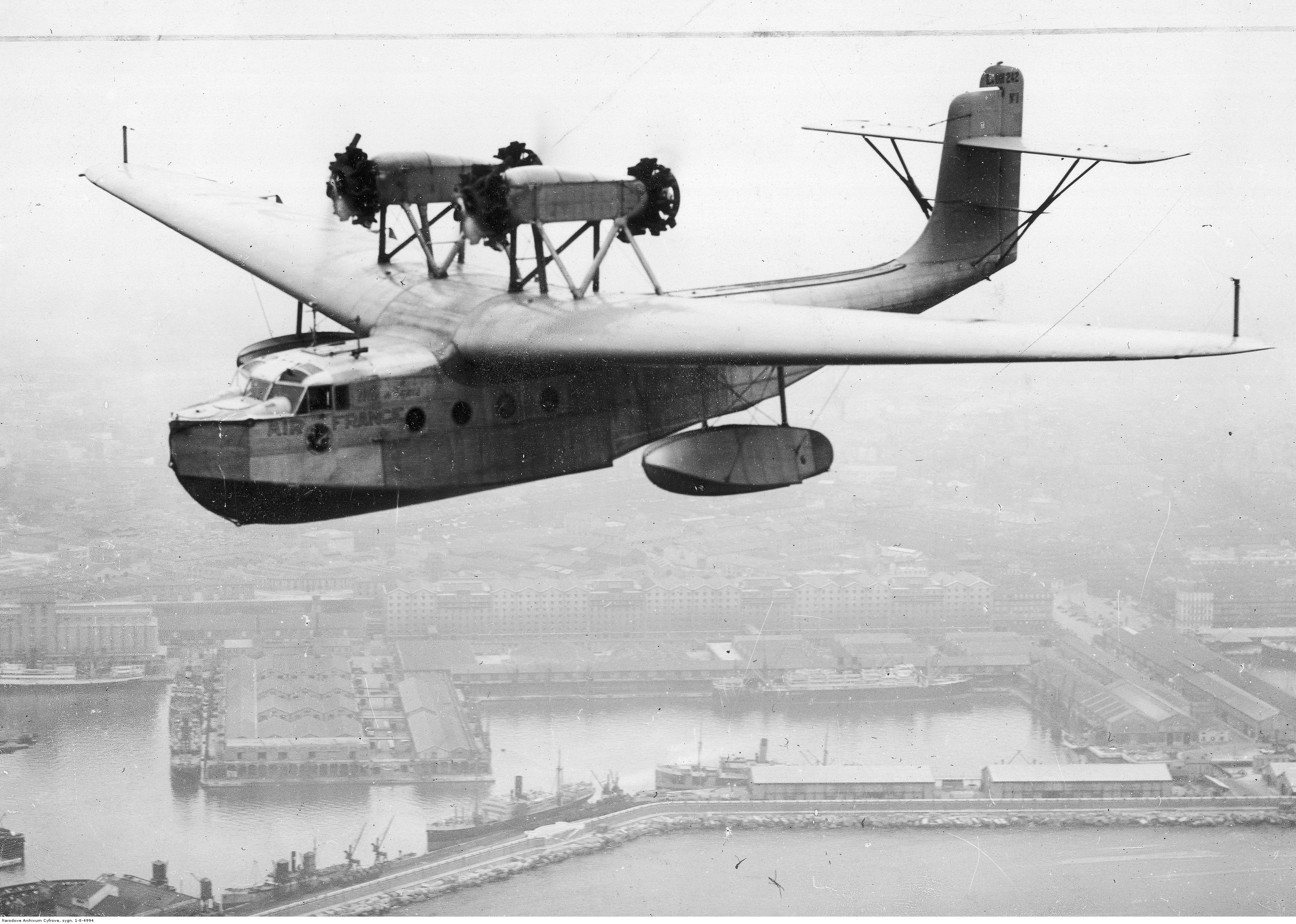
An Air France Lioré et Olivier LeO H-242

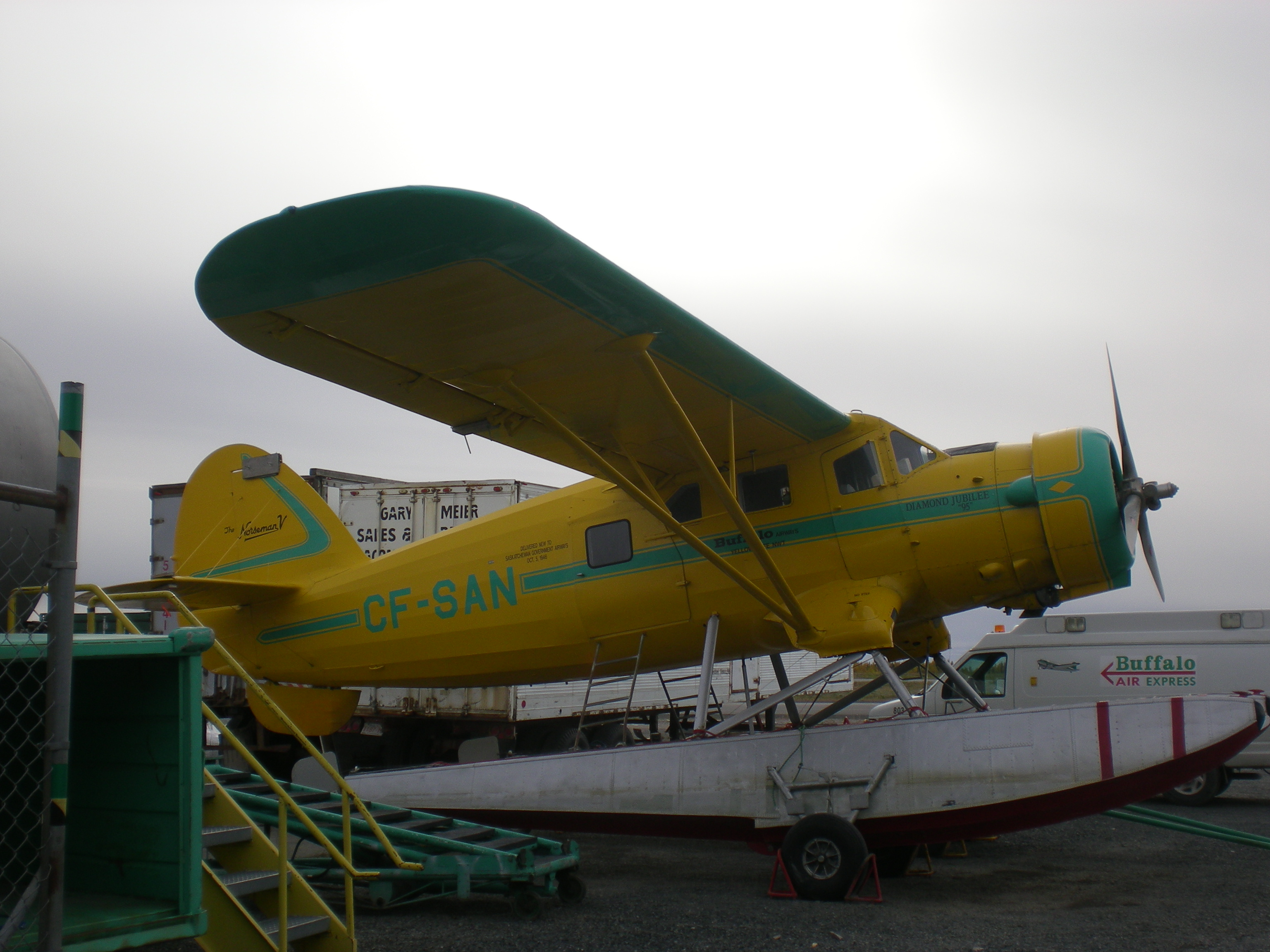
Buffalo Airways Noorduyn Norseman at Yellowknife Airport

== Seaplane operators ==
Status:

- C - Currently operates seaplanes.
- F - Operating but no longer uses seaplanes.
- D - Defunct.

| Airline | Country | Status |
|---|---|---|
| AB Aerotransport | Sweden | D |
| Ad Astra Aero | Switzerland | D |
| Aero Espresso Italiana | Italy | D |
| Aero Geral | Brazil | D |
| Aero O/Y | Finland | F |
| Aeroflot | Soviet Union | F |
| Aerolíneas Argentinas | Argentina | F |
| Aeromarine Airways | United States | D |
| Aeromarine West Indies Airways | United States | D |
| Aéropostale | France | D |
| Air Fecteau | Canada | D |
| Air France | France | F |
| Air Juan | Philippines | D |
| Air Labrador | Canada | D |
| Air Mikisew | Canada | D |
| Air Orient | France | D |
| Air Saguenay | Canada | D |
| Air Tahiti | France | F |
| Air Tindi | Canada | C |
| Air Union | France | D |
| Air Whitsunday | Australia | C |
| AirSea Lines | Greece | D |
| Ala Littoria | Italy | D |
| Alaska Airlines | United States | F |
| Alaska Seaplanes | United States | C |
| Alkan Air | Canada | C |
| Ansett Australia | Australia | D |
| Antilles Air Boats | United States | D |
| Aquila Airways | United Kingdom | D |
| Arctic Sunwest Charters | Canada | D |
| Austin Airways | Canada | D |
| Baxter Aviation | Canada | D |
| British Amphibious Airlines | United Kingdom | D |
| British Aviation Services | United Kingdom | D |
| British Marine Air Navigation Co | United Kingdom | D |
| British Overseas Airways Corporation | United Kingdom | D |
| Buffalo Airways | Canada | F |
| Canadian Airways | Canada | D |
| Catalina Air Lines | United States | D |
| Cathay Pacific | Hong Kong | F |
| Chalk's International Airlines | United States | D |
| China National Aviation Corporation (CNAC) | China | D |
| Cinnamon Air | Sri Lanka | C |
| Comité d' Etude pour la Navigation Aérienne du Congo (CENAC) | Belgium/Belgian Congo | D |
| Conair Group | Canada | C |
| Condor Syndikat | Germany | D |
| Corilair | Canada | C |
| Curtiss Flying Service | United States | D |
| Deruluft | Germany/Soviet Union | D |
| Deutsche Luft Hansa | Germany | D |
| Dobrolyot | Soviet Union | D |
| Dutch Caribbean Islandhopper | Curacao | C |
| Eastern Provincial Airways | Canada | D |
| Elders Colonial Airways | Nigeria | D |
| Eldorado Radium Silver Express | Canada | D |
| European Coastal Airlines | Croatia | D |
| Fjellfly | Norway | D |
| Fly Lapland Oy | Finland | C |
| Garuda Indonesia | Indonesia | F |
| Golden West Airlines | United States | D |
| Harbour Air Seaplanes | Canada | C |
| Hellenic Seaplanes | Greece | C |
| Imperial Airways | United Kingdom | D |
| Imperial Japanese Airways | Japan | D |
| Inter-Island Airways | United States | F |
| Jal Hans | India | C |
| Japan Air Transport | Japan | D |
| Jersey Airways | Channel Islands | D |
| Kenmore Air | United States | C |
| Kenn Borek Air | Canada | C |
| Kerala Seaplane | India | C |
| KLM | Netherlands | F |
| KLM Interinsulair Bedrijf | Dutch East Indies | D |
| KNILM | Netherlands | D |
| Lamb Air | Canada | D |
| LAN Airlines | Chile | F |
| Laurentide Air Services | Canada | D |
| Lignes Aériennes Latécoère | France | D |
| Loch Lomond Seaplanes | United Kingdom | D |
| Macau Air Transport Company | Hong Kong | D |
| Maldivian | Maldives | C |
| Maldivian Air Taxi | Maldives | D |
| Mørefly | Norway | D |
| Mount Cook Airline | New Zealand | F |
| Nakina Air Service | Canada | C |
| New York, Rio, and Buenos Aires Line (NYRBA) | United States | D |
| Norcanair | Canada | D |
| Nordair | Canada | D |
| Nordic Seaplanes | Denmark | C |
| North-Wright Airways | Canada | C |
| Northwest Airlines | United States | D |
| Northwestern Air | Canada | C |
| Norwegian Air Lines | Norway | D |
| Ontario Central Airlines | Canada | D |
| Ontario Provincial Air Service | Canada | D |
| Pacific Island Air | Fiji | D |
| Pacific Seaplanes | Canada | C |
| Pacific Western Airlines | Canada | D |
| Pan American World Airways | United States | D |
| Panair do Brasil | Brazil | D |
| Paraense Transportes Aéreos | Brazil | D |
| Pat Bay Air | Canada | D |
| Pearl Aviation | Australia | F |
| PenAir | United States | F |
| Qantas | Australia | F |
| Quebecair | Canada | D |
| Queen Charlotte Airlines | Canada | D |
| Salt Air | New Zealand | C |
| Salt Spring Air | Canada | C |
| Samaritan Aviation | Papua New Guinea | C |
| SCADTA | Colombia/Germany | D |
| Scandinavian Skies AS now renamed to Scandinavian Seaplanes | Norway | C |
| Sea To Sky Air | Canada | C |
| Seabird Airlines | Turkey | D |
| Seaborne Airlines | United States | C |
| Seair Pacific | Australia | C |
| Seair Seaplanes | Canada | C |
| Seawings | United Arab Emirates | D |
| Venice | Italy | C |
| Serviços Aéreos Cruzeiro do Sul | Brazil | D |
| Shoreline Aviation | United States | D |
| Simplifly | Sri Lanka | D |
| Società Aerea Mediterranea | Italy | D |
| Società Anonima Navigazione Aerea | Italy | D |
| Spice Shuttle | India | D |
| Star Air Service | United States | D |
| Starratt Airways | Canada | D |
| Subic Seaplane | Philippines | C |
| Summit Air | Canada | C |
| Superior Airways | Canada | C |
| Svensk Lufttrafik | Sweden | D |
| Tailwind Air Service | United States | D |
| Taquan Air | United States | C |
| TEAL | New Zealand | D |
| Tofino Air | Canada | C |
| Trans Australia Airlines | Australia | D |
| Trans Maldivian Airways | Maldives | C |
| Trans-Provincial Airlines | Canada | D |
| Transair | Canada | D |
| Transportes Aéreos Bandeirantes | Brazil | D |
| Transwest Air | Canada | C |
| Tropic Ocean Airways | United States | C |
| Vancouver Island Air | Canada | C |
| VARIG | Brazil | D |
| Viação Aérea Santos Dumont | Brazil | D |
| Wardair | Canada | D |
| Waterfront Air | Hong Kong | C |
| West Norway Airlines | Norway | D |
| Westcoast Air | Canada | D |
| Western Canada Airways | Canada | D |
| Widerøe | Norway | F |
| Wien Alaska Airways | United States | D |
| Wilderness Seaplanes | Canada | C |
| World Airways | United States | D |

== See also ==
- List of flying boats and floatplanes
- Seaplane tender
