= Vancouver Island Air =

Canadian airline

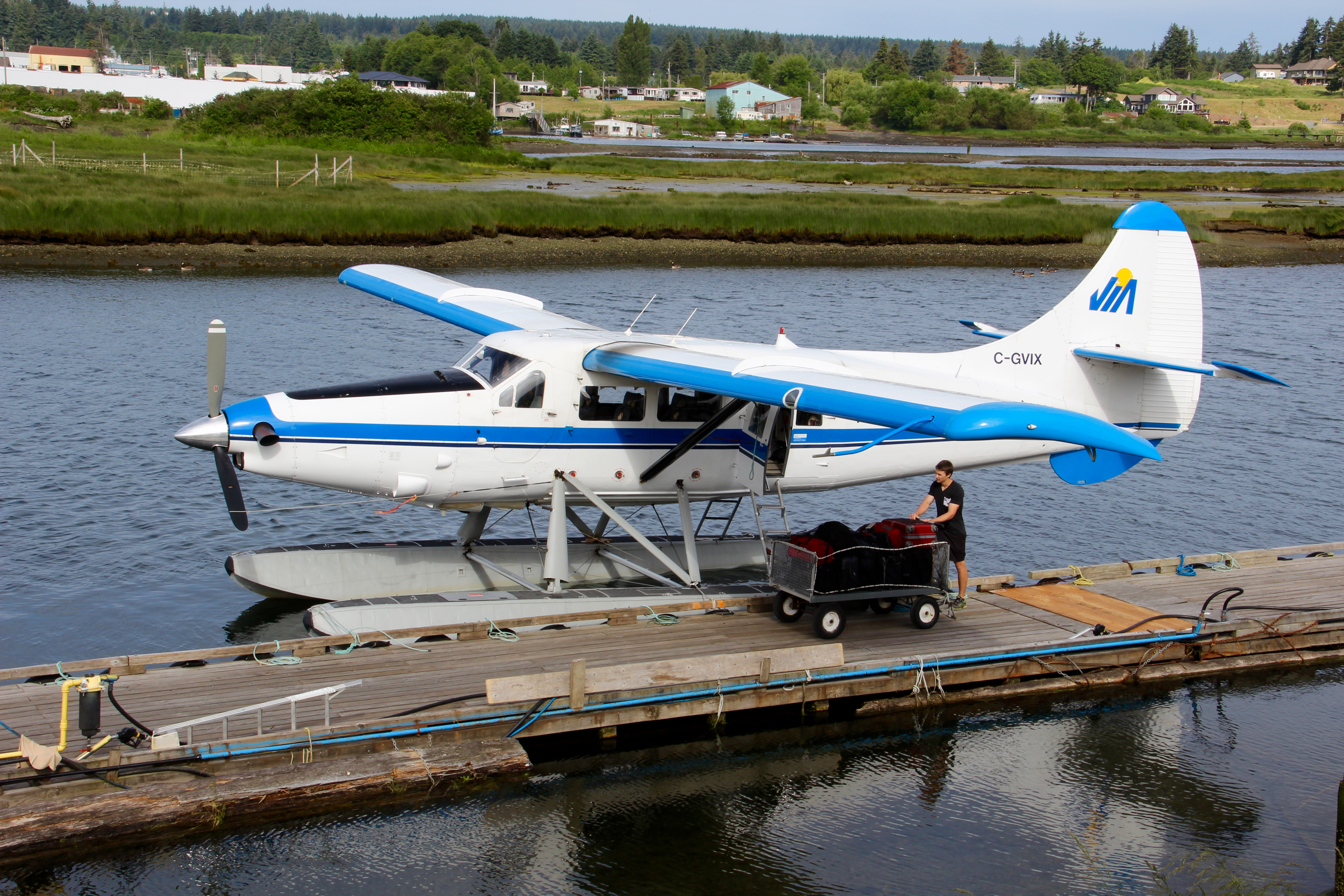
- De Havilland Canada DHC-3 Otter
- Founded: 1985
- AOC #: 4801
- Hubs: Campbell River Airport
- Fleet size: 3
- Destinations: 13
- Headquarters: Campbell River, British Columbia
- Key people: Larry Langford, Founder
- Website: www.vancouverislandair.com

Vancouver Island Air is a Vancouver Island seaplane company serving the British Columbia Coast, based in Campbell River.

== History ==
The airline has been in operation since 1985, offering charter and scheduled service with single DHC3T (Turbo Otters) aircraft on floats from Campbell River, British Columbia. The company was started by Larry Langford with a Cessna on floats and has grown to include two aircraft. It received media publicity during the 2010 Winter Olympics.

== Destinations ==
Vancouver Island Air provides a year-round scheduled service to various destinations including:

- Campbell River (Campbell River Water Aerodrome)
- Blind Channel (Blind Channel Water Aerodrome)
- Burial Cove
- Caviar Cove
- Echo Bay (Gilford Island/Echo Bay Water Aerodrome)
- Farewell Harbour
- Glendale Cove
- Greenway Sound
- Kingcome Inlet
- Lagoon Cove
- Pierre's Bay
- Port Neville
- Sullivan Bay (Sullivan Bay Water Aerodrome)

== Fleet ==
The Vancouver Island Air fleet as of September 2019:

Vancouver Island Air fleet
Aircraft	No. of Aircraft	Passengers
de Havilland Canada DHC-3 Otter	3	Up to 14 passengers

The Transport Canada site also lists a Cessna 180 but with a cancelled certificate.

Previously Vancouver Island Air flew several types of Beechcraft Model 18.
