= Lagoon Cove =

Coordinates: 50°35′59.94″N 126°18′49.87″W

Lagoon Cove, British Columbia, Canada, is located between East and West Cracroft Islands in the Inside Passage between Vancouver Island and the North American mainland. There is a commercial marina located there serving pleasure boaters. It can be approached from Knight Inlet at Minstrel Island, or from Clio Channel, or from Chatham Channel via the "Blow Hole."
