= Tofino Air =

Canadian airline

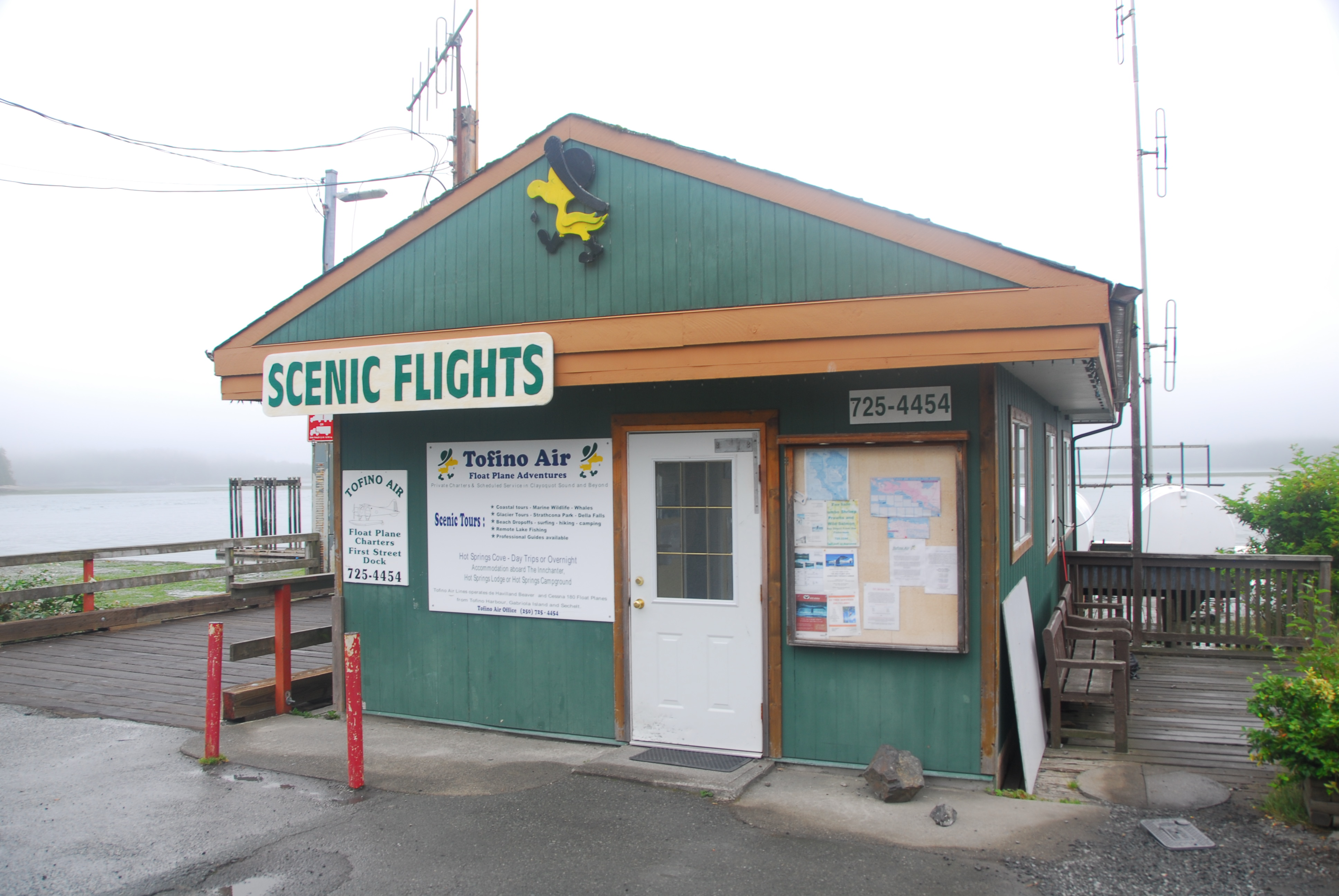
- Terminal building of Tofino Air at Tofino Harbour Water Aerodrome
IATA	ICAO	Call sign
-	-	-
- Founded: 1990s (as Midcoast Air)
- AOC #: 18343
- Hubs: Tofino Harbour Water Aerodrome, Tofino-Long Beach Airport
- Fleet size: 2
- Destinations: 3
- Website: www.tofinoair.ca

Tofino Air is a small Canadian airline offering floatplane service from Tofino, British Columbia. It offers scheduled services, scenic tours, and specialized charters.

== History ==
In the early 1990s, the owner of Tofino Air, and a lifelong resident of British Columbia's Sunshine Coast, started a small regional airline called Midcoast Air, to better assure safety and dependability for himself and his co-workers as they travelled from the logging and fishing camps on BC's west coast, to their homes on the Sunshine Coast. In 1998, Midcoast Air re-located to Sechelt.

In January 2001, Tofino Air purchased Pacific Spirit Air, which was formerly known as Hanna Air, based in Silva Bay on Gabriola Island. After purchasing Pacific Spirit Air, Tofino Air increased its daily routes by adding in scheduled flights from Gabriola Island to Vancouver International Water Airport. The airline also continued offering daily scheduled flights between Departure Bay in Nanaimo and Sechelt/Porpoise Bay.

In April 2011, Tofino Air moved from its location in Departure Bay to the Nanaimo Harbour Water Aerodrome where it began to offer scheduled flights between Nanaimo and Vancouver Harbour Flight Centre. In late May 2011, Tofino Air was one of the first airlines to move into the new Vancouver Harbour Flight Centre, All flights from Vancouver Harbour Flight Centre have been cancelled and charter flights are conducted at the Vancouver International Water Airport.

In December 2014, Tofino Air started a new subsidiary airline called Gulf Island Seaplanes to service Silva Bay on Gabriola Island to Vancouver International Water Airport using de Havilland Canada DHC-2 Beaver aircraft from Tofino Air.

In August 2015, Tofino Air dropped service from Nanaimo Harbour Water Aerodrome to Sechelt/Porpoise Bay and a new subsidiary airline called Sunshine Coast Air took over all service using de Havilland Canada DHC-2 Beaver aircraft from Tofino Air, while Tofino Air now only offers scenic tours, and specialized charters from Tofino and scheduled flights to Hot Springs Cove and Ahousaht from Tofino.

== Fleet ==
As of 4 August 2026 the Tofino Air fleet consists of the following aircraft:

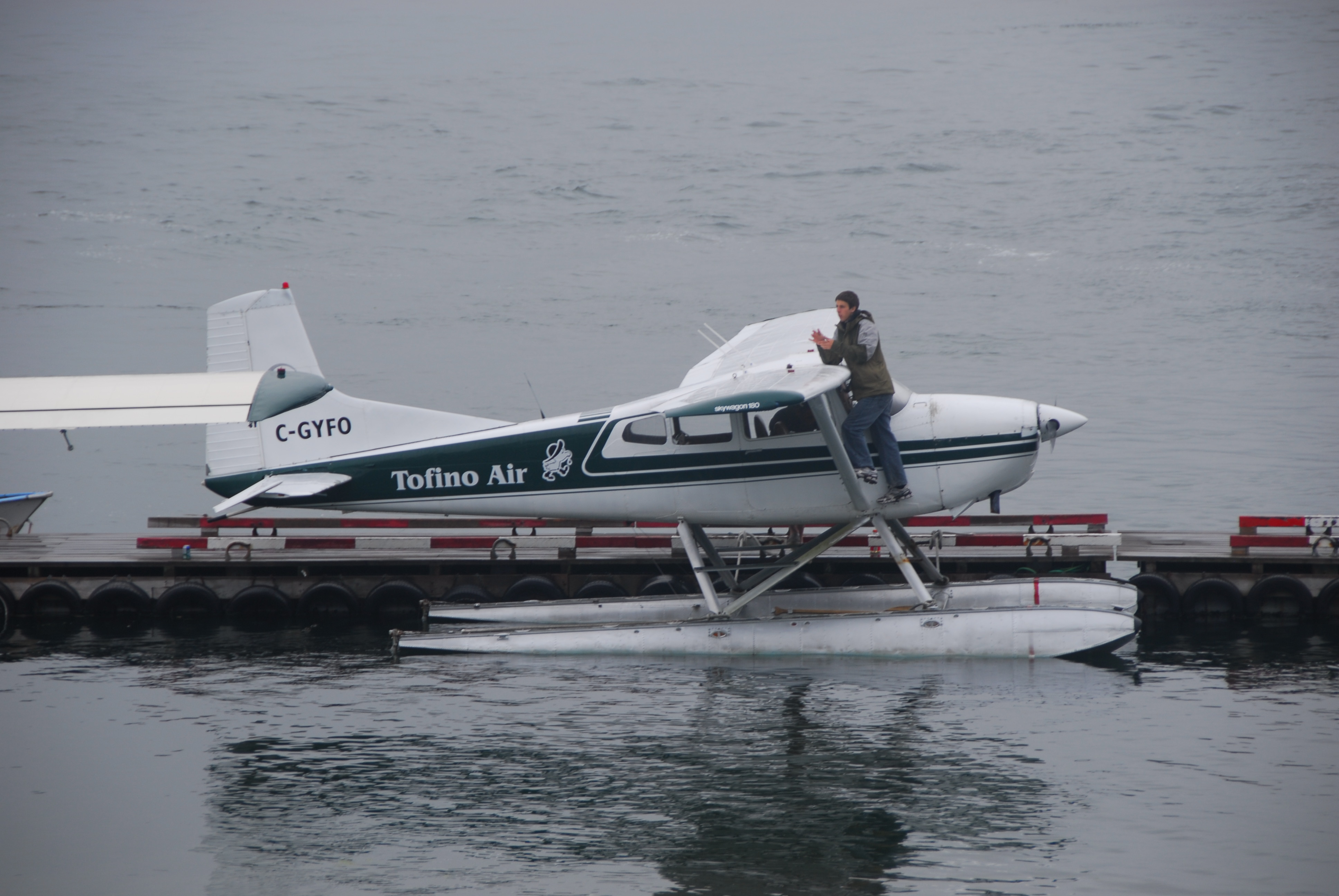
Tofino Air Cessna 180 Skywagon at Tofino Harbour Water Aerodrome

Tofino Air fleet
Aircraft	No. of aircraft	Variants	Notes
Cessna 180 Skywagon	4	180J	4 seats
Total	2		

== See also ==
- List of seaplane operators
