= Pat Bay Air =

Defunct Canadian charter float plane airline

Pat Bay Air / Sandpiper Air Ltd.

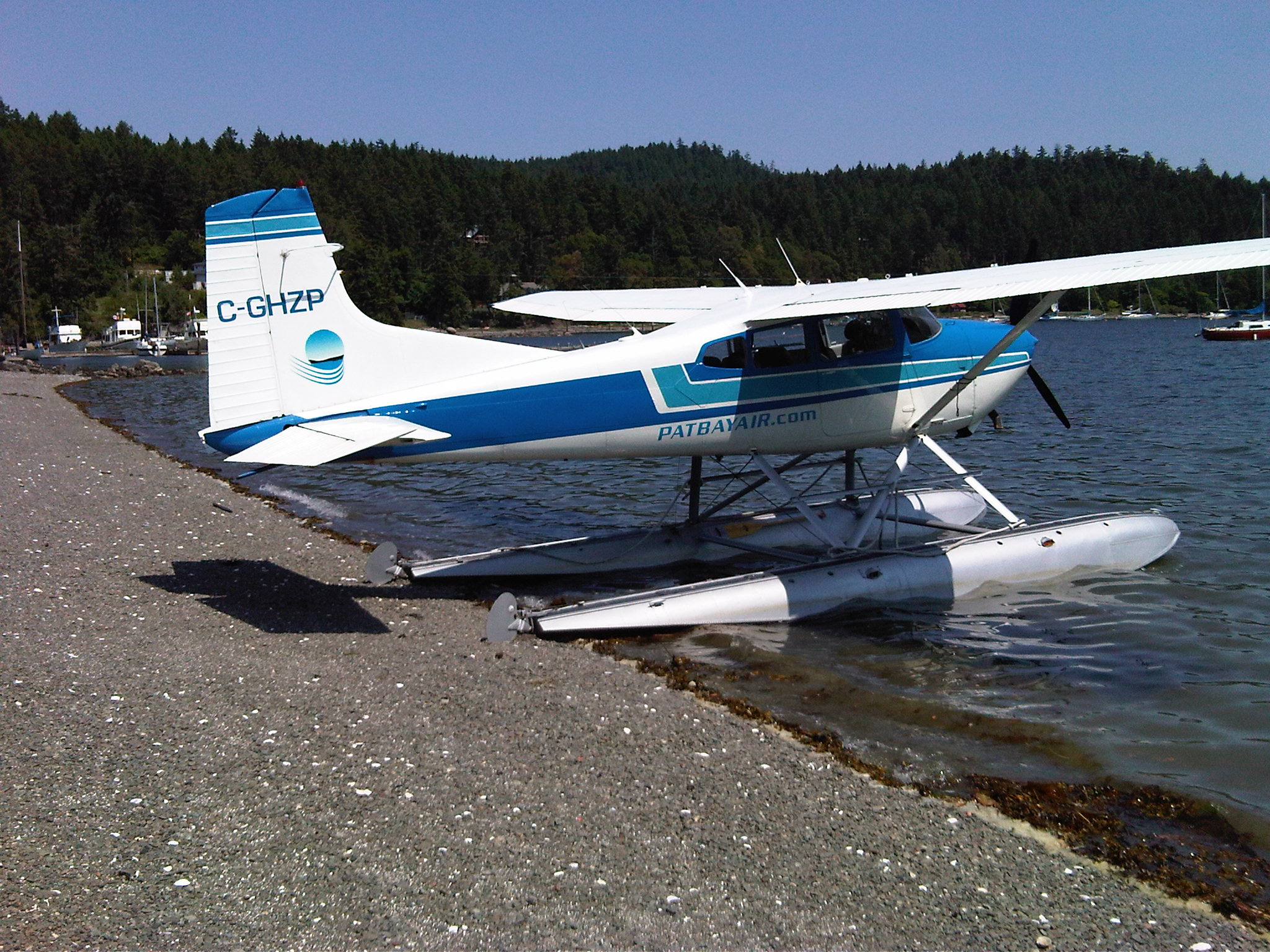
- Pat Bay Air Cessna 185
- Founded: 2005
- Ceased operations: March 2016
- Focus cities: Sidney, Cowichan Bay, Gulf Islands, Victoria, British Columbia
- Parent company: Sandpiper Air Ltd.

Pat Bay Air was a charter float plane and airline flying from the Victoria Airport Water Aerodrome in Patricia Bay near the Victoria International Airport on Widgeon Drive in North Saanich, British Columbia, Canada, where its headquarters was located. Pat Bay Air was one of only two seaplane companies to be based out of the historic Patricia Bay Seaplane Base; the other is Ocean Air Floatplanes. The seaplane base has been in continuous operation since the Second World War. Pat Bay Air Ltd. was purchased by Sandpiper Air Seaplanes Ltd. in 2013. Sandpiper Air Seaplanes Ltd. officially ceased operations in Alberta and BC in March 2016.

== Former fleet ==
- de Havilland Canada DHC-2 Beaver
- Cessna 172
- Cessna 185
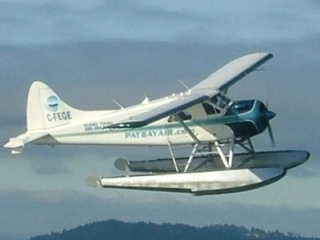
Pat Bay Air de Havilland Canada Beaver

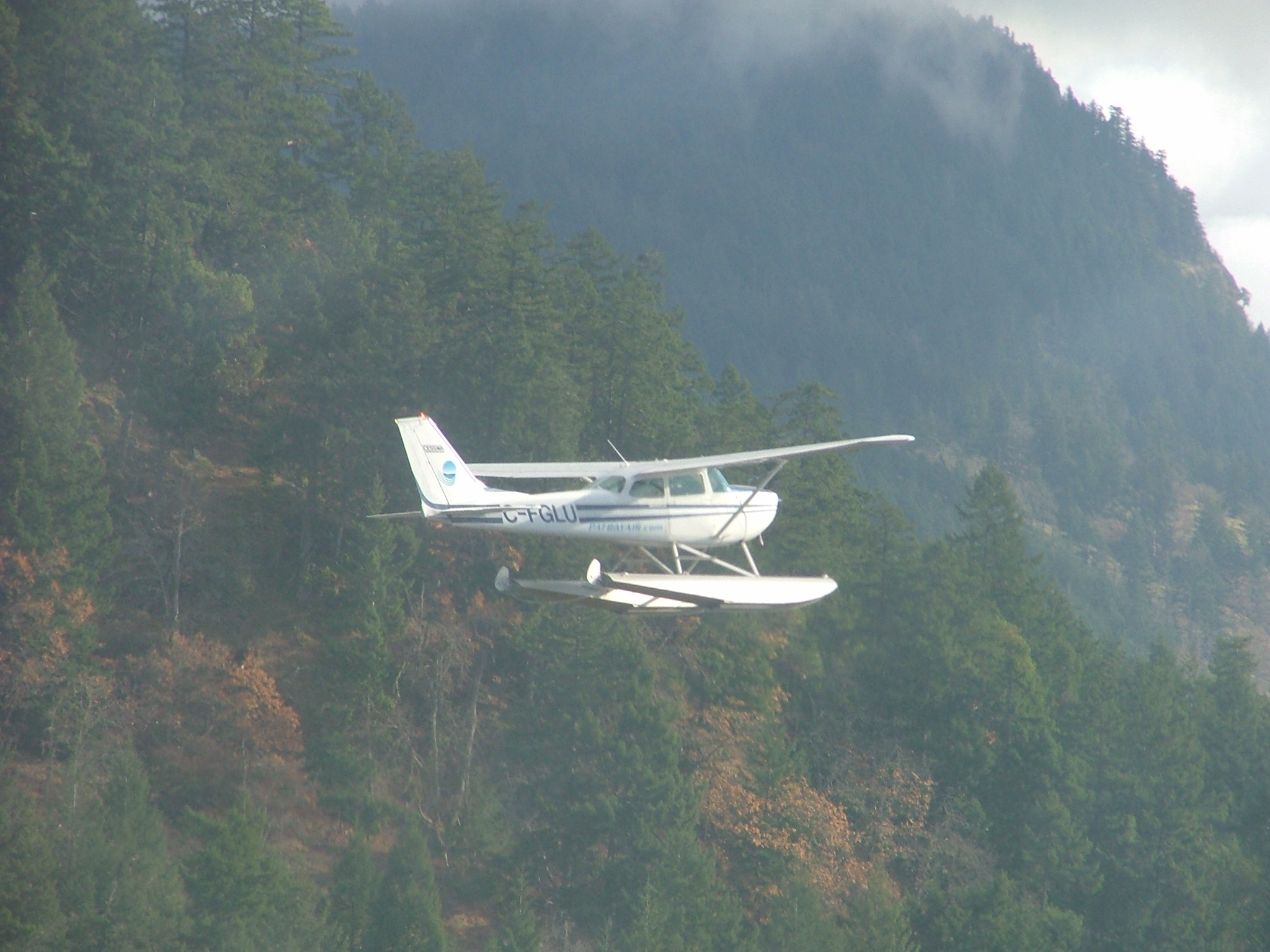
Pat Bay Air Cessna 172

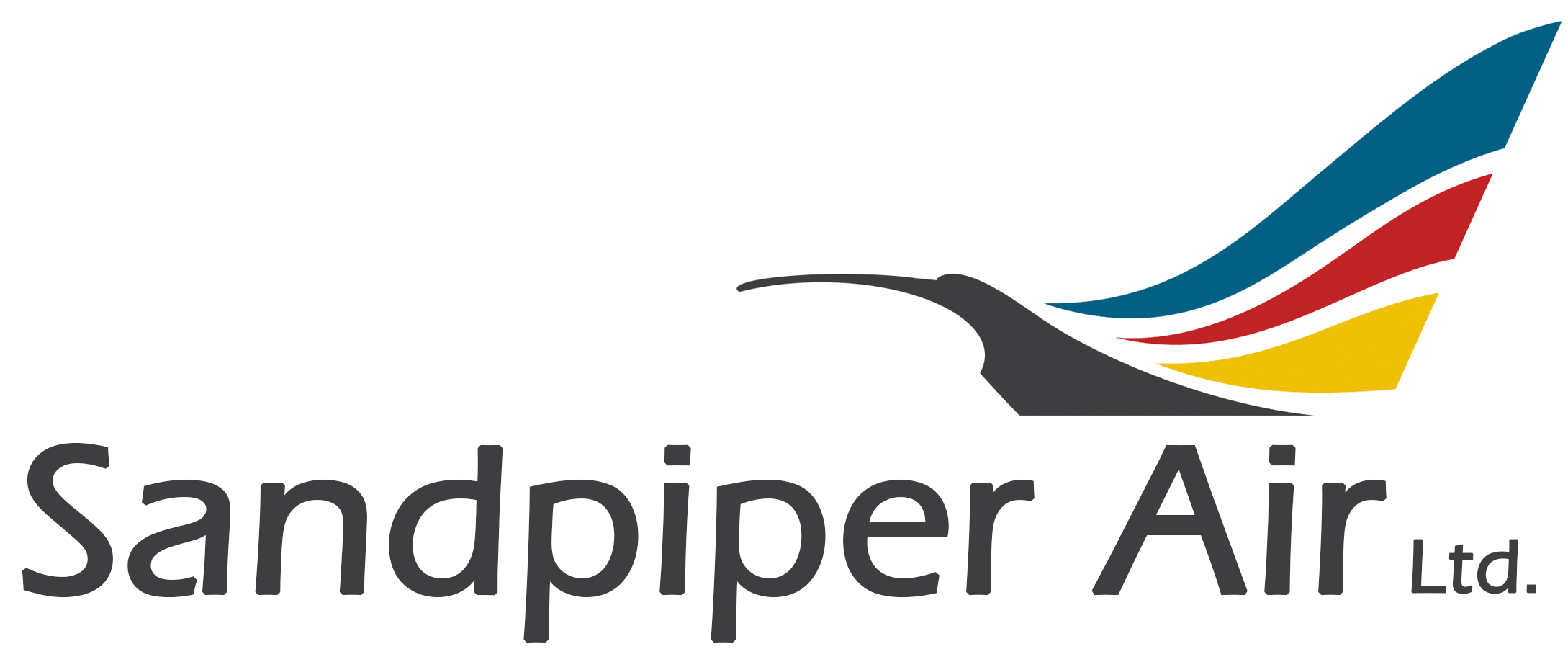

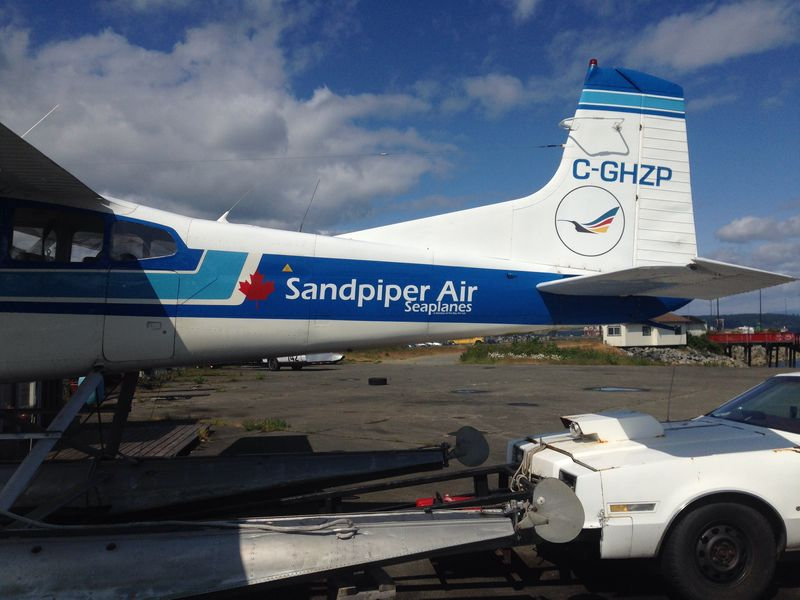

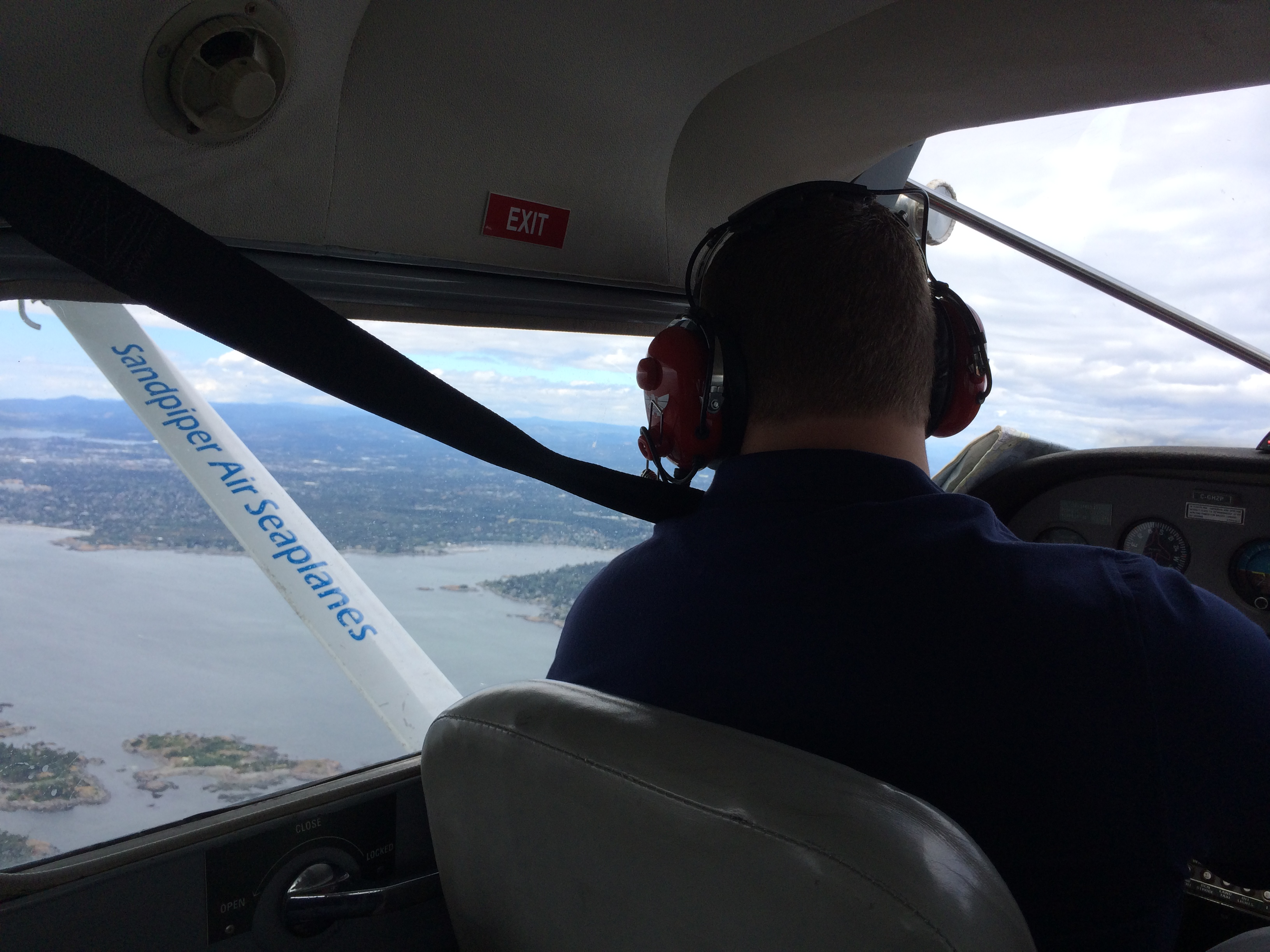

== See also ==
- List of seaplane operators
- List of defunct airlines of Canada
