= Pacific Island Air =

Fijian airline

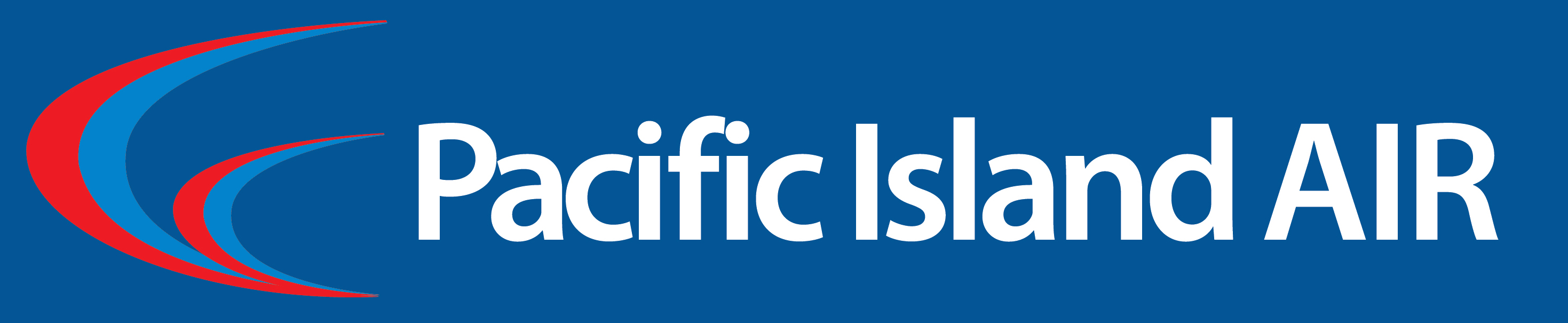
- Founded: 1999
- Ceased operations: 31 January 2025
- Operating bases: Nadi International Airport
- Fleet size: 7
- Destinations: Fiji Islands
- Headquarters: Namaka, Fiji
- Key people: Mr Tuni Beddoes (general manager), Nick Heyninck (chief pilot)
- Website: www.pacificislandair.com

Pacific Island Air was an air charter company that operated from its base at Nadi International Airport, Fiji.

== History ==
Pacific Island Seaplanes was established in 1999 by Larry 'Dusty' Simon. The air charter company initially operated two de Havilland Canada DHC-2 Beavers and a Britten-Norman Islander aircraft. Pacific Island Seaplanes was acquired by the Christchurch, New Zealand based GCH Aviation in 2013. GCH merged their existing Helicopters (Fiji) operation with Pacific Island Seaplanes to form Pacific Island Air (PIA).

On 31 January 2025, Pacific Island Air ceased all flight operations, citing the effects of the COVID-19 pandemic and the impact on tourism in Fiji as the causes for the closure of the airline.

== Locations ==
Pacific Island Air employed over 50 staff encompassing management, administration, engineering, flight crew, reservations, check-in and baggage handling. The company headquarters and hangar was located at CAAF Compound, London Avenue, Namaka, Fiji with primary check-in located at the Domestic Terminal, Nadi International Airport. The company had two additional dedicated transfer/landing sites. One was located at Sheraton Fiji Resort, Denarau Island and the other was a floating pontoon moored off Port Denarau Marina.
