= Orca Airways =

Canadian airline

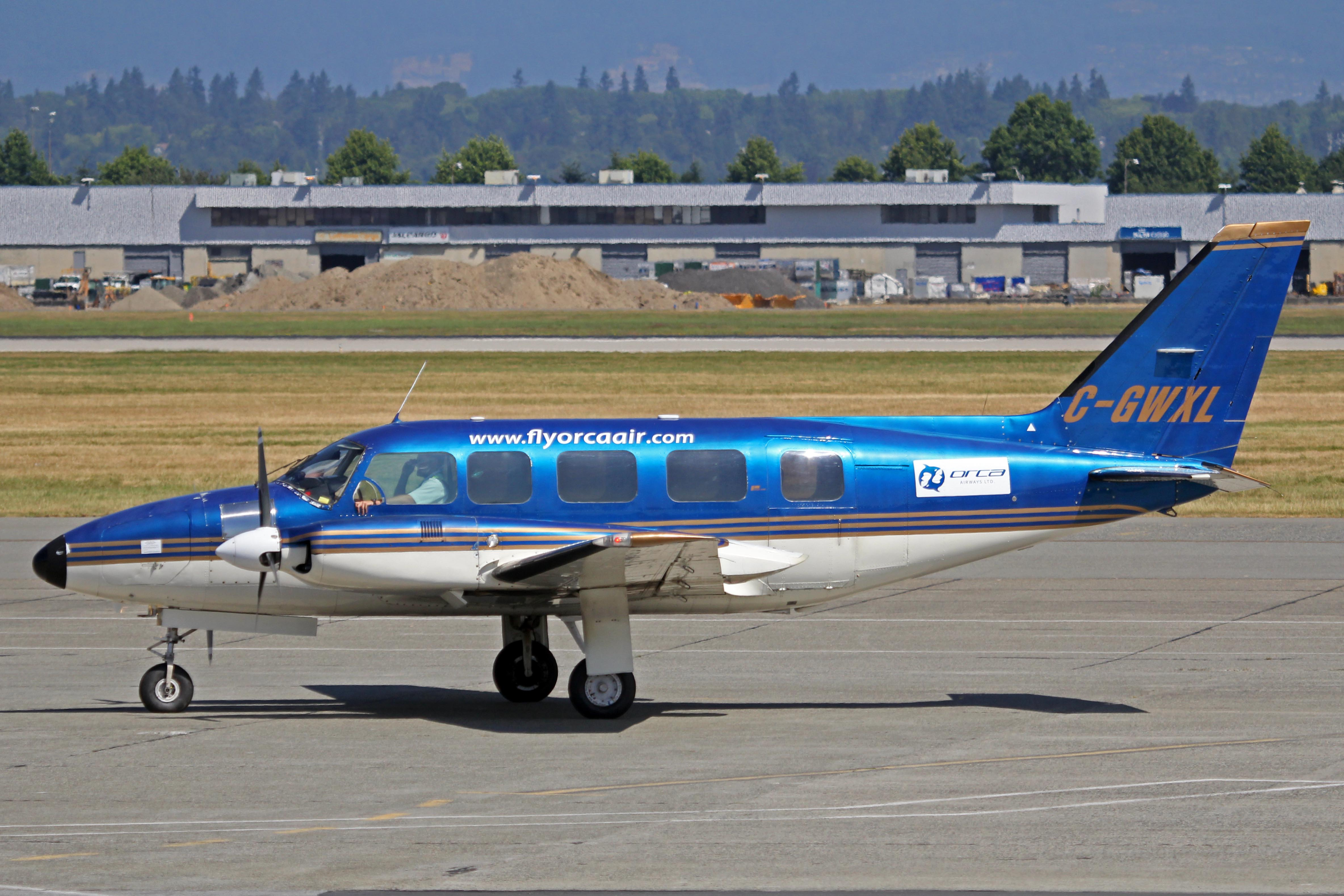
IATA	ICAO	Call sign
OR	ORK	ORCA
- Founded: 2005
- Ceased operations: April 30, 2018
- Hubs: Vancouver International Airport
- Focus cities: Tofino
- Fleet size: 20
- Destinations: 6
- Parent company: Integra Air
- Headquarters: Vancouver, British Columbia
- Website: http://www.flyorcaair.com/

Orca Airways was a scheduled and charter airline based in Vancouver, British Columbia, Canada. The airline provided scheduled commercial service, cargo and charter services, and aircraft management in Canada and the western United States. Orca operated a fleet of that includes 14 Piper PA-31-350 Chieftains, 1 Fairchild SA227s and 2 Beechcraft Model 100 King Air. The company operated from the south terminal at Vancouver International Airport.

== History ==
Orca Airways was a family-owned airline which was founded in January 2005, and began operations in July 2005. At the time it only operated routes from Vancouver International Airport to Tofino-Long Beach Airport operating one Piper Navajo on this route. It soon began expanding to provide charter service and cargo service. Orca Airways had the largest Navajo fleet airline in Canada and continued to expand providing scheduled and cargo routes across British Columbia.

On 27 February 2009 the airline acquired the small regional carrier Airspeed Aviation which was established in 1986 and based in Abbotsford, British Columbia.

On March 15, 2018 Transport Canada suspended the airline's operating certificate citing its "repeated non-compliance with aviation safety regulations".

== Destinations ==
As of April 2018, Orca Airways flew to the following destinations:

- Canada, British Columbia
  - Port Alberni ground service from Qualicum Beach
  - Qualicum Beach (Qualicum Beach Airport)
  - Tofino (Tofino-Long Beach Airport)
  - Vancouver (Vancouver International Airport)
  - Victoria (Victoria International Airport)

== Fleet ==
As of May 2018 Orca Airways fleet was still listed with Transport Canada:

Orca Airways fleet
Aircraft	No. of Aircraft	Variants	Notes
Beechcraft Model 99	1		
Beechcraft King Air	2	Model 100, Model A100	
Beechcraft Super King Air	1	Model 200	
Learjet 35	1	35A	
Piper PA-31 Navajo	14	PA-31-350 Chieftain	
Fairchild Swearingen Metroliner	1	SA227-AT	

== See also ==
- List of defunct airlines of Canada
