= Jebel Ali Seaplane Base =

- IATA: DJH; ICAO: none

Summary
- Serves: Dubai
- Location: Jebel Ali, United Arab Emirates
- Time zone: UAE Standard Time (UTC+04:00)
- Elevation AMSL: 0 m / 0 ft
- Coordinates: 24°59′20″N 055°01′26″E

Map
- Location in the UAE

Jebel Ali Seaplane Base (IATA: DJH), abbreviated as Jebel Ali (SPB), is a Seaplane base in Jebel Ali, United Arab Emirates.

== Airlines and destinations ==
Airlines	Destinations
Seawings operated by Jet Ops	Jebel Ali Seaplane Base (circular flights)
