= Farewell Harbour =

Coordinates: 50°36′04″N 126°40′18″W

Farewell Harbour is a harbour and landing in the area of Johnstone Strait of the Central Coast region of British Columbia, Canada, located between Swanson, Crease and Harbledown Islands.

== Name origin ==
Farewell Harbour was "named in 1870 by Staff Commander Pender and officers of HM hired surveying vessel Beaver, because it was the last place surveyed, and in the Beaver they had "fared well", and now it was good-bye, farewell."
