= Corilair =

Canadian airline

Corilair is a chartered and scheduled floatplane airline based in Campbell River, British Columbia, Canada. The airline primarily flies to smaller islands within British Columbia, Canada from Campbell River and Vancouver International Airport.

== Offices ==
The airline holds an office in Campbell River, British Columbia.

== Destinations ==
- Vancouver International Airport, South Terminal, seasonal
- The Discovery Islands
- Dent Island
- Stuart Island
- Refuge Cove
- Savary Island
- Cortes Island
- Blind Channel
- Desolation Island
- Pender Harbour
- Sechelt
- Campbell Island

== Fleet ==
As of February 2021, Transport Canada listed four aircraft registered to Corilair:

Corilair fleet
Aircraft	In service	Passengers	Notes
Cessna 185E	1	6 seats	
Cessna U206D	1	6 seats	
de Havilland Canada DHC-2 Beaver Mark I	2	6 seats	
Total	4		
