= Baxter Aviation =

IATA	ICAO	Call sign
6B	—	—
- Founded: 1985
- Ceased operations: 2007
- Operating bases: Nanaimo Harbour Water Aerodrome
- Fleet size: See Fleet below
- Destinations: See Services below
- Headquarters: Nanaimo, British Columbia, Canada
- Key people: Tom Baxter (cofounder); Linda Baxter (cofounder)

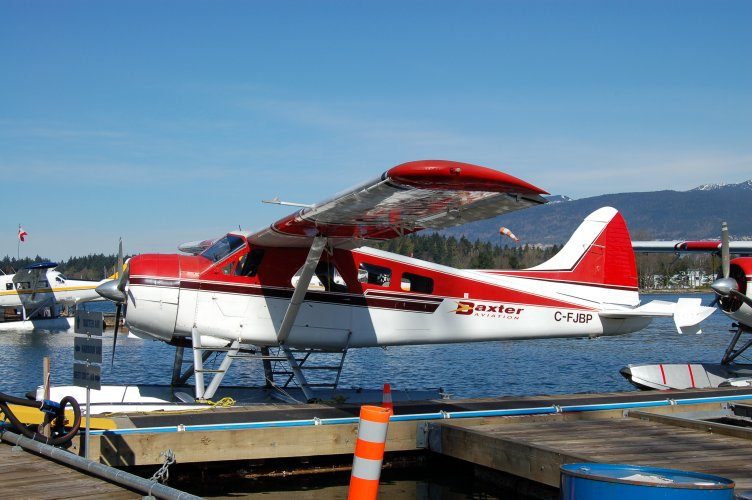
A De Havilland Beaver in Baxter Aviation livery

Baxter Aviation was an airline based in Nanaimo, British Columbia, Canada, founded by Tom and Linda Baxter which operated scheduled and chartered services throughout the Pacific Northwest with DHC-2 Beaver float-equipped aircraft.

In 2007, Baxter Aviation was taken over by West Coast Air.

== History ==
The airline was founded in 1985 by Tom and Linda Baxter and began with a single Cessna 185. Shortly after, the Baxters received a class 3 scheduled license to provide services between downtown Vancouver and Vancouver International Airport to downtown Nanaimo on Vancouver Island. Baxter operated with the IATA code 6B.

On April 20, 2007, West Coast Air completed the purchase of Baxter Aviation.

== Services ==
Baxter Aviation operated services between Vancouver Harbour Water Aerodrome and Vancouver International Water Airport to Nanaimo Harbour Water Aerodrome.

== Fleet ==
The Baxter Aviation fleet consisted of 9 de Havilland Canada DHC-2 Beaver aircraft.

== See also ==
- List of defunct airlines of Canada
