= Tofino Harbour Water Aerodrome =

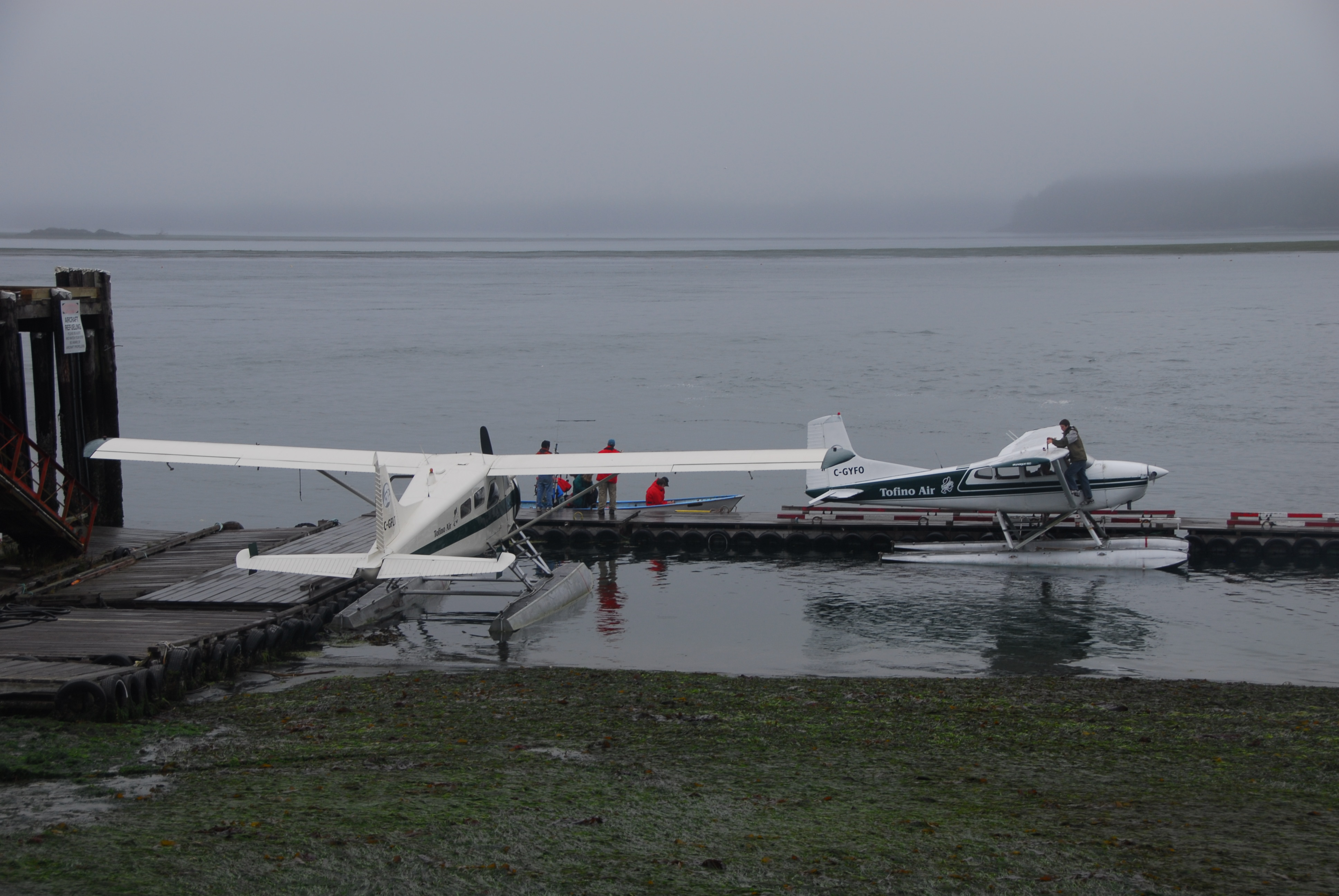
- Two Tofino Air aircraft
- IATA: YTP; ICAO: none; TC LID: CAB4

Summary
- Airport type: Private
- Operator: Tofino Airlines
- Serves: Tofino, British Columbia
- Location: Tofino Harbour
- Time zone: MST (UTC−07:00)
- Elevation AMSL: 0 ft / 0 m
- Coordinates: 49°09′15″N 125°54′34″W

Map
- Location in British Columbia CAB4 (Canada)

Runways
Direction	Length		Surface
Direction	ft	m	Surface
n/a	n/a	n/a	Water
- Source: Water Aerodrome Supplement

Tofino Harbour Water Aerodrome (IATA: YTP, TC LID: CAB4) is located in Tofino Harbour adjacent to Tofino, British Columbia, Canada.

== Airlines and destinations ==
Airlines	Destinations
Harbour Air	Vancouver Airport, Vancouver Harbour, Victoria Harbour
Tofino Air	Ahousaht, Hot Springs Cove; Charter: Nanaimo Harbour, Sechelt, Vancouver Airport

== See also ==
- List of airports on Vancouver Island
